= FIS Freestyle World Ski Championships 2013 – Women's halfpipe =

The women's halfpipe competition of the FIS Freestyle World Ski Championships 2013 was held at Tryvann Ski Resort, Oslo, Norway on March 4 (qualifying) and March 5 (finals). 22 athletes from 11 countries competed.

== Qualification ==
The following are the results of the qualification.

Rank	Bib	Name	Country	Run 1	Run 2	Best	Notes
1	3	Ayana Onozuka	Japan	87.6	51.2	87.6	Q
2	4	Rosalind Groenewoud	Canada	71.6	86.8	86.8	Q
3	1	Virginie Faivre	Switzerland	85.0	74.0	85.0	Q
4	10	Keltie Hansen	Canada	84.4	79.0	84.4	Q
5	11	Marie Martinod	France	81.0	61.0	81.0	Q
6	8	Anais Caradeux	France	80.2	34.4	80.2	Q
7	15	Angeli Vanlaanen	United States	75.6	8.2	75.6	Q
8	5	Mirjam Jaeger	Switzerland	69.6	63.6	69.6	Q
9	12	Janina Kuzma	New Zealand	67.8	63.6	67.8	Q
10	6	Annalisa Drew	United States	67.6	31.2	67.6	Q
11	7	Manami Mitsuboshi	Japan	62.2	67.0	67.0	Q
12	16	Kimmy Sharp	United States	63.4	53.6	63.4	Q
13	9	Katrien Aerts	Belgium	26.2	58.6	58.6	
14	19	Amy Sheehan	Australia	25.0	55.6	55.6	
15	17	Emma Lonsdale	Great Britain	48.0	53.6	53.6	
16	22	Elizavetta Chesnokova	Russia	41.4	41.6	41.6	
17	20	Rowan Cheshire	Great Britain	41.0	26.2	41.0	
18	14	Nina Ragettli	Switzerland	37.8	25.4	37.8	
19	18	Katia Griffiths	Spain	36.6	19.8	36.6	
20	21	Daniela Bauer	Austria	20.8	36.2	36.2	
21	23	Natalya Makagonova	Russia	34.0	34.0	17.0	
	2	Maddie Bowman	United States	DNS	DNS	DNS	

== Final ==
The following are the results of the final.

Rank	Bib	Name	Country	Run 1	Run 2	Best
1st place, gold medalist(s)	1	Virginie Faivre	Switzerland	79.4	83.8	83.8
2nd place, silver medalist(s)	8	Anais Caradeux	France	80.6	76.8	80.6
3rd place, bronze medalist(s)	3	Ayana Onozuka	Japan	80.4	78.8	80.4
4	7	Manami Mitsuboshi	Japan	68.2	75.8	75.8
5	11	Marie Martinod	France	75.6	24.4	75.6
6	15	Angeli Vanlaanen	United States	73.0	11.8	73.0
7	10	Keltie Hansen	Canada	64.6	67.0	67.0
8	5	Mirjam Jaeger	Switzerland	65.2	DNS	65.2
9	6	Annalisa Drew	United States	63.2	63.0	63.2
10	12	Janina Kuzma	New Zealand	58.8	56.6	58.8
11	16	Kimmy Sharp	United States	47.0	42.8	47.0
12	4	Rosalind Groenewoud	Canada	24.8	29.6	29.6
