= Freestyle skiing at the 2014 Winter Olympics – Women's halfpipe =

Women athletes at 2014 Olympics

Women's halfpipe at the XXII Olympic Winter Games
- Venue: Rosa Khutor Extreme Park, Krasnaya Polyana, Russia
- Dates: 20 February 2014
- Competitors: 23 from 13 nations
- Winning Score: 89.00

Medalists
1st place, gold medalist(s)		Maddie Bowman	United States
2nd place, silver medalist(s)		Marie Martinod	France
3rd place, bronze medalist(s)		Ayana Onozuka	Japan

The women's halfpipe event in freestyle skiing at the 2014 Winter Olympics in Sochi, Russia took place on 20 February 2014. In April 2011 freestyle halfpipe was added to the Olympic program, meaning the event marked its Olympic debut.

== Results ==
=== Qualification ===
Rank	Bib	Name	Country	Run 1	Run 2	Best	Notes
1	12	Marie Martinod	France	84.80	88.40	88.40	Q
2	6	Brita Sigourney	United States	87.00	80.40	87.00	Q
3	2	Maddie Bowman	United States	85.60	85.20	85.60	Q
4	8	Ayana Onozuka	Japan	83.80	59.80	83.80	Q
5	5	Angeli Vanlaanen	United States	68.20	83.00	83.00	Q
6	29	Rosalind Groenewoud	Canada	82.00	78.40	82.00	Q
7	13	Virginie Faivre	Switzerland	79.40	80.00	80.00	Q
8	14	Janina Kuzma	New Zealand	73.80	75.20	75.20	Q
9	17	Anaïs Caradeux	France	74.40	6.40	74.40	Q
10	4	Mirjam Jäger	Switzerland	73.20	27.20	73.20	Q
11	9	Annalisa Drew	United States	61.20	72.40	72.40	Q
12	3	Amy Sheehan	Australia	19.60	70.60	70.60	Q
13	22	Keltie Hansen	Canada	8.60	66.20	66.20	
14	20	Sabrina Cakmakli	Germany	64.80	16.60	64.80	
15	15	Davina Williams	Australia	5.40	63.00	63.00	
16	26	Katia Griffiths	Spain	54.40	56.60	56.60	
17	10	Katrien Aerts	Belgium	51.40	54.40	54.40	
18	21	Emma Lonsdale	Great Britain	53.80	53.20	53.80	
19	19	Elizaveta Chesnokova	Russia	43.80	50.00	50.00	
20	27	Natalya Makagonova	Russia	42.60	43.80	43.80	
21	28	Park Hee-Jin	South Korea	42.40	20.40	42.40	
22	23	Nina Ragettli	Switzerland	18.00	DNS	18.00	
23	16	Manami Mitsuboshi	Japan	15.60	9.20	15.60	

Q – Qualified for final; DNS – Did not start

=== Final ===
Rank	Bib	Name	Country	Run 1	Run 2	Best	Notes
1st place, gold medalist(s)	2	Maddie Bowman	United States	85.80	89.00	89.00	
2nd place, silver medalist(s)	12	Marie Martinod	France	84.80	85.40	85.40	
3rd place, bronze medalist(s)	8	Ayana Onozuka	Japan	79.00	83.20	83.20	
4	13	Virginie Faivre	Switzerland	74.40	78.00	78.00	
5	14	Janina Kuzma	New Zealand	77.00	74.80	77.00	
6	6	Brita Sigourney	United States	27.80	76.00	76.00	
7	29	Rosalind Groenewoud	Canada	5.40	74.20	74.20	
8	4	Mirjam Jäger	Switzerland	71.20	16.00	71.20	
9	9	Annalisa Drew	United States	66.40	9.60	66.40	
10	3	Amy Sheehan	Australia	15.00	40.60	40.60	
11	5	Angeli Vanlaanen	United States	13.80	29.60	29.60	
12	17	Anaïs Caradeux	France	DNS	DNS		
