= Switzerland at the 2014 Winter Olympics =

- IOC code: SUI
- NOC: Swiss Olympic Association
- Website: www.swissolympic.ch (in German and French)

in Sochi
- Competitors: 163 in 12 sports
- Flag bearers: Simon Ammann (opening); Patrizia Kummer (closing)
- Medals Ranked 7th: Gold 7 Silver 2 Bronze 2 Total 11

Winter Olympics appearances (overview)
- 1924; 1928; 1932; 1936; 1948; 1952; 1956; 1960; 1964; 1968; 1972; 1976; 1980; 1984; 1988; 1992; 1994; 1998; 2002; 2006; 2010; 2014; 2018; 2022; 2026

Switzerland competed at the 2014 Winter Olympics in Sochi, Russia, from 7 to 23 February 2014. 163 athletes were participating, making it the largest team Switzerland has ever sent to the Olympic Winter Games. The four-time Olympic gold medalist Simon Ammann was the flag bearer for the opening ceremony.

== Medalists ==
Medal	Name	Sport	Event	Date
Gold	Dario Cologna	Cross-country skiing	Men's 30 kilometre skiathlon	February 9
Gold	Iouri Podladtchikov	Snowboarding	Men's halfpipe	February 11
Gold	Dominique Gisin	Alpine skiing	Women's downhill	February 12
Gold	Sandro Viletta	Alpine skiing	Men's combined	February 14
Gold	Dario Cologna	Cross-country skiing	Men's 15 kilometre classical	February 14
Gold	Patrizia Kummer	Snowboarding	Women's parallel giant slalom	February 19
Gold	Alex Baumann; Beat Hefti	Bobsleigh	Two-man	February 17
Silver	Selina Gasparin	Biathlon	Women's individual	February 14
Silver	Nevin Galmarini	Snowboarding	Men's parallel giant slalom	February 19
Bronze	Lara Gut	Alpine skiing	Women's downhill	February 12
Bronze	Switzerland women's national ice hockey team: Janine Alder; Livia Altmann; Sophie Anthamatten; Laura Benz; Sara Benz; Nicole Bullo; Romy Eggimann; Sarah Forster; Angela Frautschi; Jessica Lutz; Julia Marty; Stefanie Marty; Alina Müller; Katrin Nabholz; Evelina Raselli; Florence Schelling; Lara Stalder; Phoebe Stanz; Anja Stiefel; Sandra Thalmann; Nina Waidacher	Ice hockey	Women's tournament	February 20

== Alpine skiing ==
The Swiss Olympic selection committee named the following 21 athletes to the Winter Olympic team. Both Silvan Zurbriggen and Nadja Kamer were selected to the team but did not compete in any race.

Men

Athlete	Event	Run 1		Run 2		Total	
Athlete	Event	Time	Rank	Time	Rank	Time	Rank
Luca Aerni	Slalom	DNF					
Gino Caviezel	Giant slalom	1:25.45	35	1:24.95	22	2:50.40	30
Mauro Caviezel	Combined	1:54.75	13	DNF			
Mauro Caviezel	Giant slalom	1:23.58	=23	1:26.17	34	2:49.75	28
Didier Défago	Downhill	—N/a				2:07.79	14
Didier Défago	Super-G	—N/a				DNF	
Didier Défago	Giant slalom	DNF					
Beat Feuz	Downhill	—N/a				2:07.49	13
Beat Feuz	Super-G	—N/a				1:20.65	27
Beat Feuz	Combined	1:54.46	10	53.29	15	2:47.75	15
Carlo Janka	Downhill	—N/a				2:06.71	6
Carlo Janka	Super-G	—N/a				1:20.01	22
Carlo Janka	Giant slalom	1:22.52	9	1:24.52	19	2:47.04	13
Carlo Janka	Combined	1:54.42	9	52.46	11	2:46.88	8
Patrick Küng	Downhill	—N/a				2:07.82	15
Patrick Küng	Super-G	—N/a				1:19.38	12
Justin Murisier	Slalom	49.92	33	DNF			
Sandro Viletta	Combined	1:54.88	14	50.32	2	2:45.20	1st place, gold medalist(s)
Daniel Yule	Slalom	48.38	=12	DSQ			
Ramon Zenhäusern	Slalom	51.01	39	58.39	19	1:49.40	19

Women

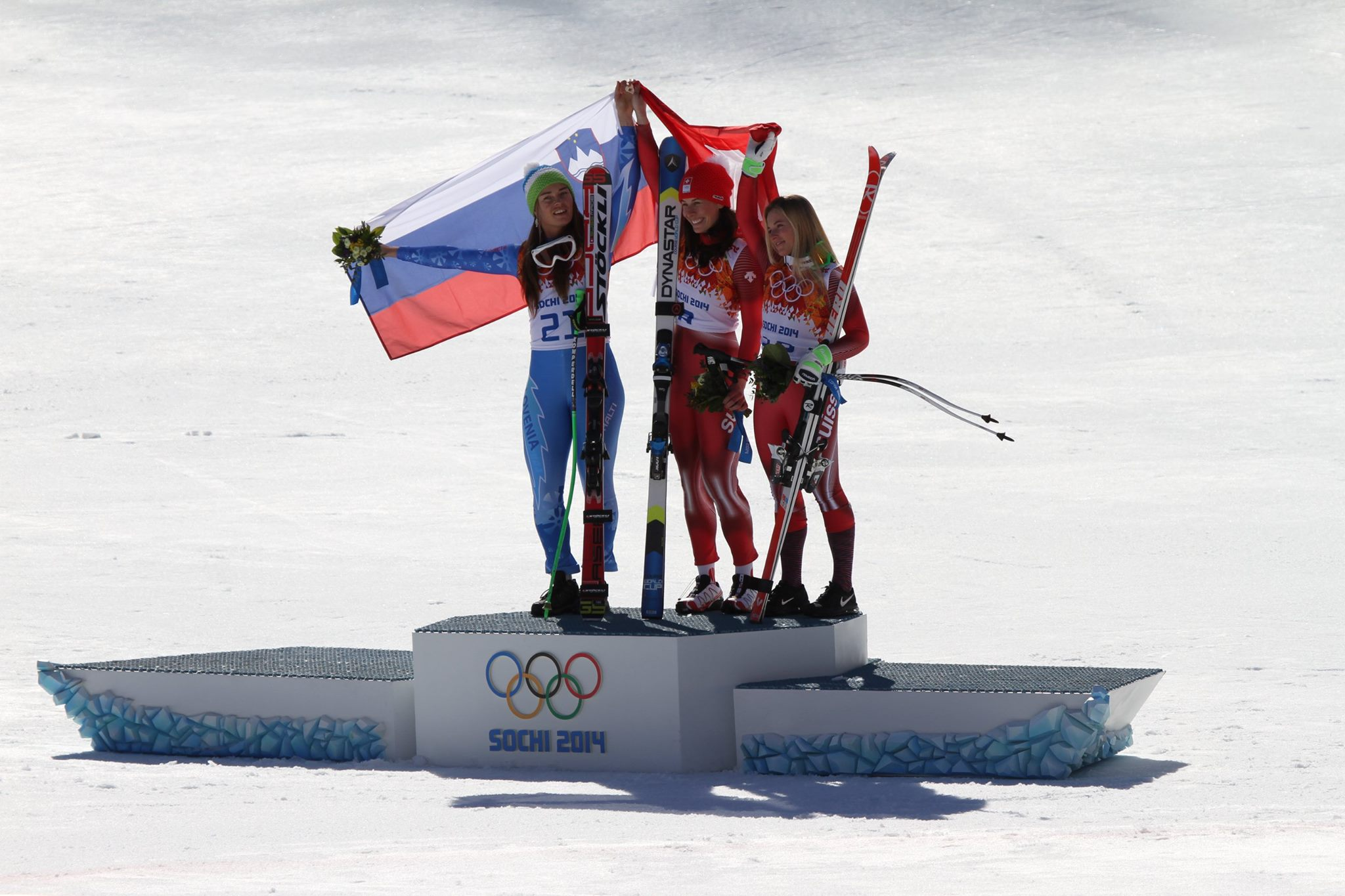
Women's downhill podium

Athlete	Event	Run 1		Run 2		Total	
Athlete	Event	Time	Rank	Time	Rank	Time	Rank
Fränzi Aufdenblatten	Super-G	—N/a				1:26.79	6
Denise Feierabend	Combined	1:46.03	24	51.68	6	2:37.71	12
Denise Feierabend	Slalom	55.80	15	53.67	22	1:49.47	17
Dominique Gisin	Downhill	—N/a				1:41.57	1st place, gold medalist(s)
Dominique Gisin	Super-G	—N/a				DNF	
Dominique Gisin	Combined	1:44.01	10	52.11	11	2:36.12	5
Dominique Gisin	Giant slalom	1:19.99	11	1:19.59	19	2:39.58	10
Michelle Gisin	Slalom	1:00.73	38	56.39	27	1:57.12	28
Lara Gut	Downhill	—N/a				1:41.67	3rd place, bronze medalist(s)
Lara Gut	Super-G	—N/a				1:26.25	4
Lara Gut	Combined	1:43.15	2	DNF			
Lara Gut	Giant slalom	1:20.54	16	1:18.10	2	2:38.64	9
Wendy Holdener	Giant slalom	DNF					
Wendy Holdener	Slalom	DNF					
Marianne Kaufmann-Abderhalden	Downhill	—N/a				DNF	
Marianne Kaufmann-Abderhalden	Combined	DNF					
Fabienne Suter	Downhill	—N/a				1:41.94	5
Fabienne Suter	Super-G	—N/a				1:26.89	7
Fabienne Suter	Giant slalom	1:22.07	28	1:19.99	25	2:42.06	26

== Biathlon ==
Based on their performance at the 2012 and 2013 Biathlon World Championships, Switzerland qualified 5 men and 4 women.

Men

Athlete	Event	Time	Misses	Rank
Claudio Böckli	Individual	58:19.2	4 (1+1+0+2)	79
Simon Hallenbarter	Individual	54:52.2	1 (1+0+0+0)	47
Ivan Joller	Individual	56:40.6	3 (0+1+1+1)	67
Benjamin Weger	Sprint	27:00.5	1 (1+0)	63
Benjamin Weger	Individual	54:54.5	4 (1+1+1+1)	48
Serafin Wiestner	Sprint	26:10.2	2 (1+1)	40
Serafin Wiestner	Pursuit	39:48.1	7 (2+1+3+1)	57
Claudio Böckli; Ivan Joller; Benjamin Weger; Serafin Wiestner	Team relay	1:16:15.8	10 (0+10)	14

Women

Athlete	Event	Time	Misses	Rank
Irene Cadurisch	Individual	49:01.0	1 (0+0+1+0)	37
Aita Gasparin	Individual	52:14.9	5 (1+3+1+0)	62
Elisa Gasparin	Sprint	21:38.2	0 (0+0)	8
Elisa Gasparin	Pursuit	32:42.8	5 (2+1+1+1)	31
Elisa Gasparin	Individual	48:46.9	3 (1+1+1+0)	33
Elisa Gasparin	Mass start	DNF	0 (0+1)	DNF
Selina Gasparin	Sprint	21:46.5	1 (0+1)	13
Selina Gasparin	Pursuit	30:59.1	2 (0+0+1+1)	15
Selina Gasparin	Individual	44:35.3	0 (0+0+0+0)	2nd place, silver medalist(s)
Selina Gasparin	Mass start	36:54.9	0 (0+1+1+0)	9
Irene Cadurisch; Aita Gasparin; Elisa Gasparin; Selina Gasparin	Team relay	1:12:34.3	9 (0+9)	9

Mixed

Athlete	Event	Time	Misses	Rank
Elisa Gasparin; Selina Gasparin; Simon Hallenbarter; Benjamin Weger	Team relay	1:13:33.9	9 (0+9)	12

== Bobsleigh ==
Switzerland qualified a total of thirteen athletes in the following sleds. The qualification was based on the world rankings as of 20 January 2014.

Men

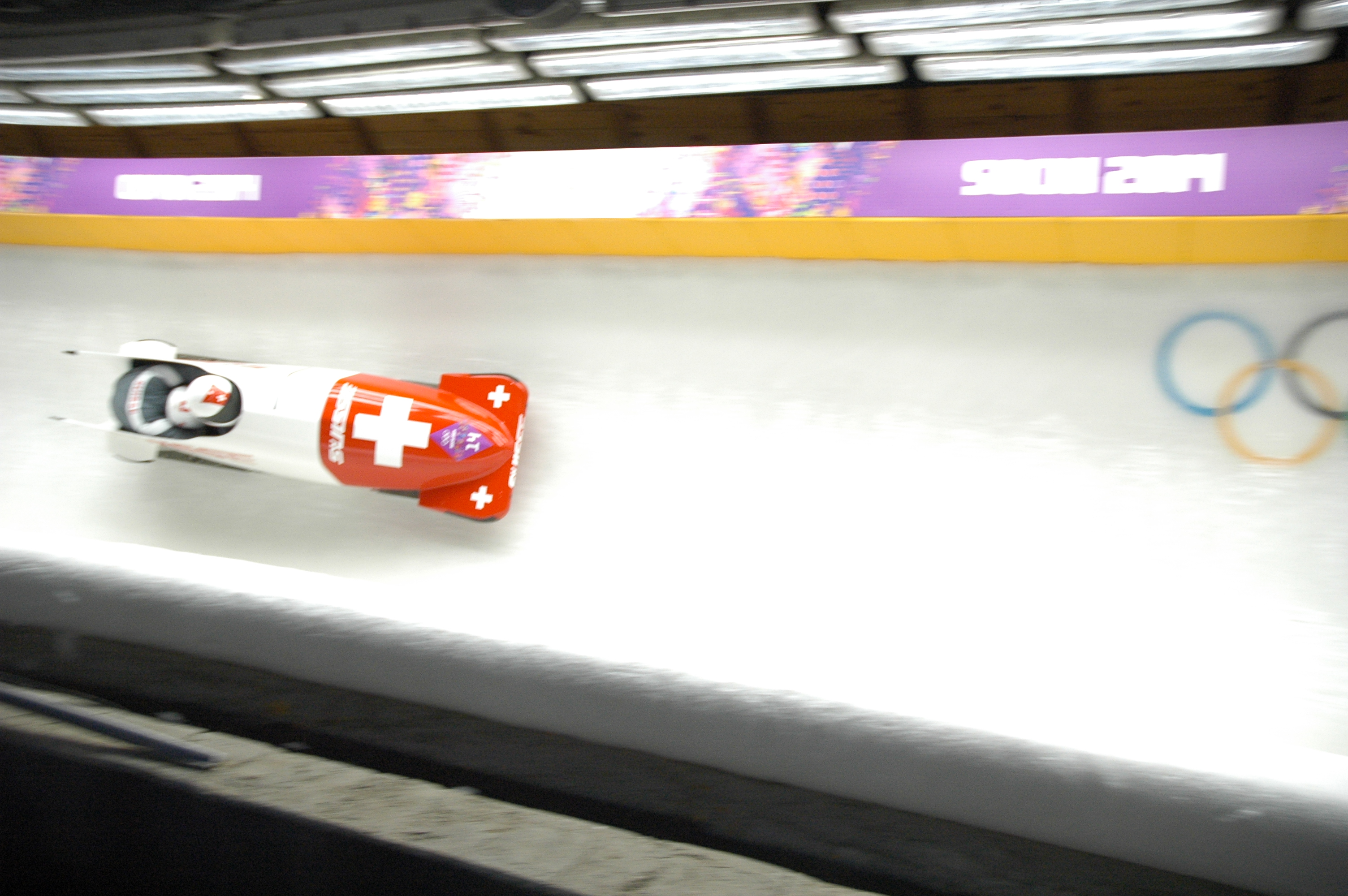
SUI-2 two-man sled

Athlete	Event	Run 1		Run 2		Run 3		Run 4		Total	
Athlete	Event	Time	Rank	Time	Rank	Time	Rank	Time	Rank	Time	Rank
Alex Baumann; Beat Hefti*	Two-man	56.46	4	56.68	=3	56.26	2	56.65	3	3:46.05	1st place, gold medalist(s)
Juerg Egger; Rico Peter*	Two-man	56.96	13	56.68	=3	56.60	7	56.72	6	3:46.96	10
Alex Baumann; Juerg Egger; Beat Hefti*; Thomas Lamparter	Four-man	55.21	9	55.34	3	55.60	=8	55.60	=9	3:41.75	8

* – Denotes the driver of each sled

Women

Athlete	Event	Run 1		Run 2		Run 3		Run 4		Total	
Athlete	Event	Time	Rank	Time	Rank	Time	Rank	Time	Rank	Time	Rank
Fabienne Meyer*; Tanja Mayer	Two-woman	58.18	10	58.34	9	58.29	7	58.39	9	3:53.20	8

* – Denotes the driver of each sled

== Cross-country skiing ==
Distance
Men

Athlete	Event	Classical		Freestyle		Final		
Athlete	Event	Time	Rank	Time	Rank	Time	Deficit	Rank
Jonas Baumann	15 km classical	—N/a				40.33.2	+2:03.5	24
Jonas Baumann	30 km skiathlon	37:06.1	34	33:14.8	30	1:10:52.3	+2:36.9	29
Dario Cologna	15 km classical	—N/a				38:29.7	+0.0	1st place, gold medalist(s)
Dario Cologna	30 km skiathlon	36:04.9	13	31:39.6	2	1:08:15.4	+0.0	1st place, gold medalist(s)
Dario Cologna	50 km freestyle	—N/a				1:48:21.6	+1:26.4	27
Remo Fischer	50 km freestyle	—N/a				1:47:44.2	+49.0	22
Toni Livers	50 km freestyle	—N/a				1:48:49.9	+1:54.7	30
Curdin Perl	15 km classical	—N/a				40:27.8	+1:58.1	22
Curdin Perl	30 km skiathlon	36:40.8	24	33:05.4	27	1:10:22.4	+2:07.0	27
Curdin Perl	50 km freestyle	—N/a				1:47:31.3	+36.1	12
Jonas Baumann; Remo Fischer; Toni Livers; Curdin Perl	4×10 km relay	—N/a				1:30:33.8	+1:51.8	7

Women

Athlete	Event	Final		
Athlete	Event	Time	Deficit	Rank
Seraina Boner	30 km freestyle	1:12:35.0	+1:29.8	9

Sprint
Men

Athlete	Event	Qualification		Quarterfinal		Semifinal		Final	
Athlete	Event	Time	Rank	Time	Rank	Time	Rank	Time	Rank
Dario Cologna	Sprint	3:35.03	13 Q	4:39.69	6	did not advance			
Jovian Hediger	Sprint	3:42.34	47	did not advance					
Jöri Kindschi	Sprint	3:36.89	23 Q	3:47.94	5	did not advance			
Roman Schaad	Sprint	4:56.63	83	did not advance					
Dario Cologna; Gianluca Cologna	Team sprint	—N/a				23:42.31	3 q	23:35.90	5

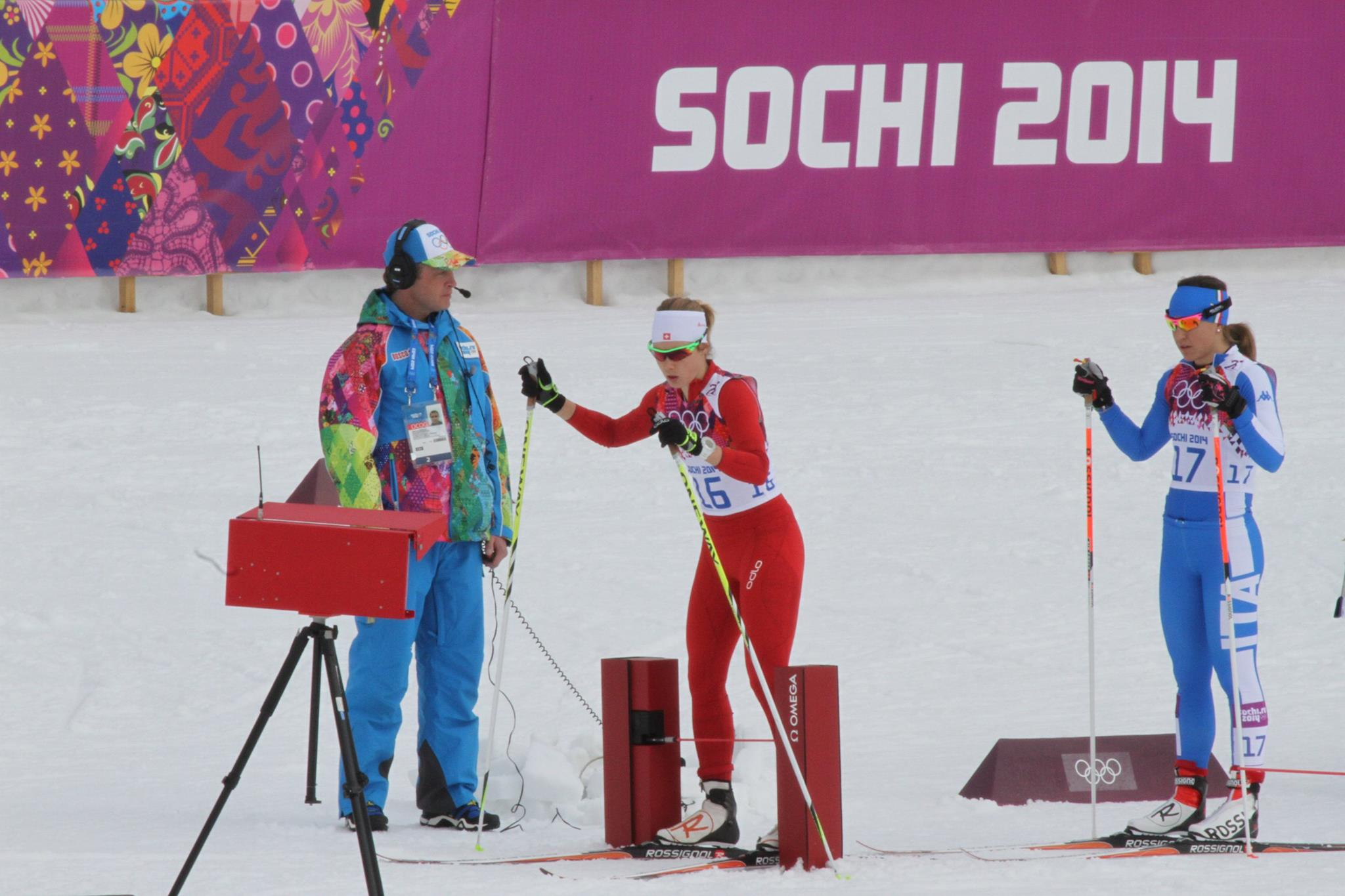
Laurien van der Graaff (left)

Women

Athlete	Event	Qualification		Quarterfinal		Semifinal		Final	
Athlete	Event	Time	Rank	Time	Rank	Time	Rank	Time	Rank
Laurien van der Graaff	Sprint	2:37.84	20 Q	2:37.95	5	did not advance			
Seraina Boner; Bettina Gruber	Team sprint	—N/a				17:02.14	4 q	16:45.47	7

== Curling ==
Based on results from 2012 World Women's Curling Championship and the 2013 World Women's Curling Championship, and based on the 2012 World Men's Curling Championship and the 2013 World Men's Curling Championship, Switzerland qualified a women's team and a men's team (consisting of five athletes) as one of the seven highest ranked nations.

=== Men's tournament ===
- Roster - Sven Michel, Simon Gempeler, Claudio Pätz, Benoit Schwarz, Sandro Trolliet

Preliminary round

Final round robin standings
Team	Skip	Pld	W	L	PF	PA	EW	EL	BE	SE	S%	Qualification
Sweden	Niklas Edin	9	8	1	60	44	38	30	18	8	86%	Playoffs
Canada	Brad Jacobs	9	7	2	69	53	39	36	14	7	84%	Playoffs
China	Liu Rui	9	7	2	67	50	41	37	11	5	85%	Playoffs
Norway	Thomas Ulsrud	9	5	4	52	53	36	33	18	5	86%	Tiebreaker
Great Britain	David Murdoch	9	5	4	51	49	37	35	15	8	83%	Tiebreaker
Denmark	Rasmus Stjerne	9	4	5	54	61	32	37	17	4	81%	
Russia	Andrey Drozdov	9	3	6	58	70	36	38	13	7	77%	
Switzerland	Sven Michel	9	3	6	47	46	31	34	22	7	83%	
United States	John Shuster	9	2	7	47	58	30	39	14	7	80%	
Germany	John Jahr	9	1	8	53	74	38	39	10	9	76%	

Round-robin

Draw 1

Monday, 10 February, 9:00 am

Sheet B	1	2	3	4	5	6	7	8	9	10	Final
Switzerland (Michel) 🔨	0	2	0	0	0	1	0	0	2	0	5
Sweden (Edin)	0	0	0	0	2	0	3	1	0	1	7

Draw 2

Monday, 10 February, 7:00 pm

Sheet C	1	2	3	4	5	6	7	8	9	10	Final
Canada (Jacobs) 🔨	0	0	0	0	0	2	0	1	0	1	4
Switzerland (Michel)	0	0	0	0	3	0	1	0	1	0	5

Draw 4

Wednesday, 12 February, 9:00 am

Sheet D	1	2	3	4	5	6	7	8	9	10	Final
China (Liu) 🔨	0	2	0	1	0	0	0	1	0	1	5
Switzerland (Michel)	0	0	2	0	1	0	0	0	1	0	4

Draw 5

Wednesday, 12 February, 7:00 pm

Sheet B	1	2	3	4	5	6	7	8	9	10	Final
Switzerland (Michel)	0	0	0	0	1	0	0	1	0	0	2
Great Britain (Murdoch) 🔨	0	0	1	1	0	1	0	0	0	1	4

Draw 6

Thursday, 14 February, 2:00 pm

Sheet A	1	2	3	4	5	6	7	8	9	10	Final
Switzerland (Michel)	0	2	1	0	0	0	1	2	0	0	6
Russia (Drozdov) 🔨	0	0	0	0	2	1	0	0	1	3	7

Draw 8

Friday, 14 February, 7:00 pm

Sheet D	1	2	3	4	5	6	7	8	9	10	Final
Switzerland (Michel)	1	0	2	0	1	0	0	2	0	1	7
Germany (Jahr) 🔨	0	2	0	1	0	2	1	0	2	0	8

Draw 9

Saturday, 15 February, 2:00 pm

Sheet B	1	2	3	4	5	6	7	8	9	10	Final
Denmark (Stjerne)	0	0	0	0	2	0	1	0	X	X	3
Switzerland (Michel) 🔨	4	0	0	0	0	2	0	3	X	X	9

Draw 11

Sunday, 16 February, 7:00 pm

Sheet A	1	2	3	4	5	6	7	8	9	10	Final
Norway (Ulsrud) 🔨	0	1	0	1	0	1	1	0	0	1	5
Switzerland (Michel)	0	0	1	0	1	0	0	0	1	0	3

Draw 12

Monday, 17 February, 2:00 pm

Sheet C	1	2	3	4	5	6	7	8	9	10	Final
Switzerland (Michel) 🔨	1	1	0	0	1	0	2	1	0	X	6
United States (Shuster)	0	0	0	1	0	1	0	0	1	X	3

=== Women's tournament ===
- Roster – Mirjam Ott, Janine Greiner, Carmen Küng, Alina Pätz, Carmen Schäfer

Preliminary round

Final round robin standings
Team	Skip	Pld	W	L	PF	PA	EW	EL	BE	SE	S%	Qualification
Canada	Jennifer Jones	9	9	0	72	40	43	27	12	14	86%	Playoffs
Sweden	Margaretha Sigfridsson	9	7	2	58	52	37	35	13	7	80%	Playoffs
Switzerland	Mirjam Ott	9	5	4	63	60	37	38	13	7	78%	Playoffs
Great Britain	Eve Muirhead	9	5	4	74	58	39	35	9	11	80%	Playoffs
Japan	Ayumi Ogasawara	9	4	5	59	67	39	41	4	10	76%	
Denmark	Lene Nielsen	9	4	5	57	56	34	40	12	9	78%	
China	Wang Bingyu	9	4	5	58	62	36	38	10	4	81%	
South Korea	Kim Ji-sun	9	3	6	60	65	35	37	10	6	79%	
Russia	Anna Sidorova	9	3	6	48	56	33	35	19	6	82%	
United States	Erika Brown	9	1	8	42	75	33	40	8	5	76%	

Round-robin

Draw 1

Monday, 10 February, 2:00 pm

Sheet B	1	2	3	4	5	6	7	8	9	10	Final
Switzerland (Ott) 🔨	0	0	0	3	2	0	0	2	0	X	7
United States (Brown)	1	0	1	0	0	1	0	0	1	X	4

Draw 2

Tuesday, 11 February, 9:00 am

Sheet A	1	2	3	4	5	6	7	8	9	10	Final
Switzerland (Ott) 🔨	1	0	2	0	0	2	0	1	0	1	7
Denmark (Nielsen)	0	1	0	2	0	0	1	0	2	0	6

Draw 3

Tuesday, 11 February, 7:00 pm

Sheet B	1	2	3	4	5	6	7	8	9	10	Final
South Korea (Kim) 🔨	0	1	0	1	0	0	2	0	2	0	6
Switzerland (Ott)	0	0	0	0	2	3	0	2	0	1	8

Draw 5

Thursday, 13 February, 9:00 am

Sheet D	1	2	3	4	5	6	7	8	9	10	Final
Switzerland (Ott)	0	1	0	2	0	0	3	0	2	0	8
Sweden (Sigfridsson) 🔨	1	0	3	0	3	0	0	1	0	1	9

Draw 6

Thursday, 13 February, 7:00 pm

Sheet C	1	2	3	4	5	6	7	8	9	10	Final
Switzerland (Ott)	0	0	0	2	0	0	1	2	0	X	5
Canada (Jones) 🔨	0	1	1	0	2	1	0	0	3	X	8

Draw 7

Friday, 14 February, 2:00 pm

Sheet D	1	2	3	4	5	6	7	8	9	10	Final
Russia (Sidorova)	0	2	0	0	0	2	0	0	2	X	6
Switzerland (Ott) 🔨	1	0	0	1	0	0	0	1	0	X	3

Draw 9

Saturday, 15 February, 7:00 pm

Sheet C	1	2	3	4	5	6	7	8	9	10	Final
Great Britain (Muirhead)	1	0	0	0	1	0	2	0	2	0	6
Switzerland (Ott) 🔨	0	2	1	0	0	3	0	1	0	1	8

Draw 10

Sunday, 16 February, 2:00 pm

Sheet B	1	2	3	4	5	6	7	8	9	10	11	Final
Japan (Ogasawara)	0	0	2	1	2	0	2	0	0	0	2	9
Switzerland (Ott) 🔨	1	1	0	0	0	3	0	0	1	1	0	7

Draw 12

Monday, 17 February, 7:00 pm

Sheet A	1	2	3	4	5	6	7	8	9	10	Final
China (Wang)	0	0	2	1	0	1	0	0	2	0	6
Switzerland (Ott) 🔨	1	3	0	0	2	0	0	3	0	1	10

==== Semifinal ====
Wednesday, 19 February, 2:00 pm

Team	1	2	3	4	5	6	7	8	9	10	Final
Sweden (Sigfridsson) 🔨	1	0	2	0	0	0	1	0	2	1	7
Switzerland (Ott)	0	2	0	0	1	0	0	2	0	0	5

==== Bronze medal game ====
Thursday, 20 February, 12:30 pm'

Team	1	2	3	4	5	6	7	8	9	10	Final
Great Britain (Muirhead)	0	0	1	0	2	0	0	2	0	1	6
Switzerland (Ott) 🔨	0	2	0	1	0	1	0	0	1	0	5

== Freestyle skiing ==
24 Swiss freestyle skiers (10 women and 14 men) were competing in 4 disciplines. On 22 January 2014, the Swiss Olympic committee selected 5 athletes for the Aerials team. Thomas Lambert and Renato Ulrich were competing in their third consecutive Winter Olympics. On 23 January 2014, 6 athletes joined the slopestyle team, a sport that made its first appearance at the Olympics. On 27 January 2014, 7 athletes were selected for the ski cross team. The 2010 Olympic champion Michael Schmid and the 2013 World champion Fanny Smith were competing for the second time. 6 athletes were selected for the Halfpipe team, a sport that was also part of the Winter Olympics for the first time.

Aerials

Athlete	Event	Qualification				Final					
Athlete	Event	Jump 1		Jump 2		Jump 1		Jump 2		Jump 3	
Athlete	Event	Points	Rank	Points	Rank	Points	Rank	Points	Rank	Points	Rank
Mischa Gasser	Men's aerials	96.52	14	83.91	12	did not advance					
Thomas Lambert	Men's aerials	96.83	13	89.38	8	did not advance					
Renato Ulrich	Men's aerials	115.84	3 Q	BYE		80.53	12	did not advance			
Tanja Schärer	Women's aerials	48.72	21	77.17	8	did not advance					

Halfpipe

Athlete	Event	Qualification				Final			
Athlete	Event	Run 1	Run 2	Best	Rank	Run 1	Run 2	Best	Rank
Joel Gisler	Men's halfpipe	60.80	2.60	60.80	18	did not advance			
Nils Lauper	Men's halfpipe	65.00	58.00	65.00	16	did not advance			
Yannic Lerjen	Men's halfpipe	67.60	29.60	67.60	14	did not advance			
Virginie Faivre	Women's halfpipe	79.40	80.00	80.00	7 Q	74.40	78.00	78.00	4
Mirjam Jäger	Women's halfpipe	73.20	27.20	73.20	10 Q	71.20	16.20	71.20	8
Nina Ragettli	Women's halfpipe	18.00	DNS	18.00	22	did not advance			

Ski cross

Athlete	Event	Seeding		Round of 16	Quarterfinal	Semifinal	Final	
Athlete	Event	Time	Rank	Position	Position	Position	Position	Rank
Alex Fiva	Men's ski cross	DNF	30	4	did not advance			31
Armin Niederer	Men's ski cross	1:17.39	8	2 Q	1 Q	4 FB	3	7
Michael Schmid	Men's ski cross	DNS	32	DNS	did not advance			32
Sanna Lüdi	Women's ski cross	1:22.37	6	1 Q	DNF	did not advance		13
Jorinde Müller	Women's ski cross	1:22.46	7	4	did not advance			25
Katrin Müller	Women's ski cross	1:23.85	12	1 Q	3	did not advance		10
Fanny Smith	Women's ski cross	1:24.61	16	2 Q	2 Q	4 FB	4	8

Qualification legend: FA – Qualify to medal round; FB – Qualify to consolation round

Slopestyle

Athlete	Event	Qualification				Final			
Athlete	Event	Run 1	Run 2	Best	Rank	Run 1	Run 2	Best	Rank
Elias Ambühl	Men's slopestyle	58.00	65.80	65.80	22	did not advance			
Fabian Bösch	Men's slopestyle	11.80	63.00	63.00	23	did not advance			
Kai Mahler	Men's slopestyle	76.20	29.00	76.20	16	did not advance			
Luca Schuler	Men's slopestyle	6.80	5.20	6.80	32	did not advance			
Camillia Berra	Women's slopestyle	74.40	74.80	74.80	10 Q	5.60	30.40	30.40	12
Eveline Bhend	Women's slopestyle	67.20	77.20	77.20	9 Q	58.40	63.20	63.20	9

== Ice hockey ==
Switzerland qualified a men's team by being one of the 9 highest ranked teams in the IIHF World Ranking following the 2012 World Championships. The women's team qualified by being one of the 5 highest ranked teams in the IIHF World Ranking following the 2012 Women's World Championships.

=== Men's tournament ===
Roster

The following is the Swiss roster in the men's ice hockey tournament of the 2014 Winter Olympics.

No.	Pos.	Name	Height	Weight	Birthdate	Birthplace	2013–14 team
1	G	Jonas Hiller	188 cm (6 ft 2 in)	86 kg (190 lb)	12 February 1982	Felben-Wellhausen	(United States) Anaheim Ducks (NHL)
3	D	Julien Vauclair	183 cm (6 ft 0 in)	90 kg (200 lb)	2 October 1979	Delémont	(Switzerland) HC Lugano (NLA)
5	D	Severin Blindenbacher	180 cm (5 ft 11 in)	86 kg (190 lb)	15 March 1983	Zürich	(Switzerland) ZSC Lions (NLA)
6	D	Yannick Weber	180 cm (5 ft 11 in)	91 kg (201 lb)	23 September 1988	Morges	(Canada) Vancouver Canucks (NHL)
7	D	Mark Streit – A	183 cm (6 ft 0 in)	93 kg (205 lb)	11 December 1977	Englisberg	(United States) Philadelphia Flyers (NHL)
10	F	Andres Ambühl	178 cm (5 ft 10 in)	86 kg (190 lb)	14 September 1983	Davos	(Switzerland) ZSC Lions (NLA)
12	F	Luca Cunti	188 cm (6 ft 2 in)	95 kg (209 lb)	4 July 1989	Zürich	(Switzerland) ZSC Lions (NLA)
14	F	Roman Wick	188 cm (6 ft 2 in)	94 kg (207 lb)	30 December 1985	Zuzwil	(Switzerland) ZSC Lions (NLA)
16	D	Raphael Diaz	180 cm (5 ft 11 in)	90 kg (200 lb)	9 January 1986	Baar	(Canada) Vancouver Canucks (NHL)
20	G	Reto Berra	196 cm (6 ft 5 in)	91 kg (201 lb)	3 January 1987	Bülach	(Canada) Calgary Flames (NHL)
22	F	Nino Niederreiter	188 cm (6 ft 2 in)	93 kg (205 lb)	8 September 1992	Chur	(United States) Minnesota Wild (NHL)
23	F	Simon Bodenmann	178 cm (5 ft 10 in)	85 kg (187 lb)	2 March 1988	Urnäsch	(Switzerland) Kloten Flyers (NLA)
24	F	Reto Suri	183 cm (6 ft 0 in)	84 kg (185 lb)	25 March 1989	Zürich	(Switzerland) EV Zug (NLA)
28	F	Martin Plüss – A	175 cm (5 ft 9 in)	80 kg (180 lb)	5 April 1977	Bülach	(Switzerland) SC Bern (NLA)
31	D	Mathias Seger – C	180 cm (5 ft 11 in)	84 kg (185 lb)	17 December 1977	Flawil	(Switzerland) ZSC Lions (NLA)
43	F	Morris Trachsler	183 cm (6 ft 0 in)	90 kg (200 lb)	15 July 1984	Zürich	(Switzerland) ZSC Lions (NLA)
48	F	Matthias Bieber	180 cm (5 ft 11 in)	85 kg (187 lb)	14 March 1986	Zürich	(Switzerland) Kloten Flyers (NLA)
51	F	Ryan Gardner	201 cm (6 ft 7 in)	100 kg (220 lb)	18 April 1978	Toronto, Canada	(Switzerland) SC Bern (NLA)
52	G	Tobias Stephan	196 cm (6 ft 5 in)	82 kg (181 lb)	7 April 1984	Zürich	(Switzerland) Genève-Servette HC (NLA)
70	F	Denis Hollenstein	183 cm (6 ft 0 in)	88 kg (194 lb)	15 October 1989	Zürich	(Switzerland) Genève-Servette HC (NLA)
72	D	Patrick von Gunten	180 cm (5 ft 11 in)	83 kg (183 lb)	10 February 1985	Biel/Bienne	(Switzerland) Kloten Flyers (NLA)
82	F	Simon Moser	188 cm (6 ft 2 in)	95 kg (209 lb)	10 March 1989	Bern	(United States) Nashville Predators (NHL)
88	F	Kevin Romy	180 cm (5 ft 11 in)	83 kg (183 lb)	31 January 1985	La Chaux-de-Fonds	(Switzerland) Genève-Servette HC (NLA)
90	D	Roman Josi	185 cm (6 ft 1 in)	90 kg (200 lb)	1 June 1990	Bern	(United States) Nashville Predators (NHL)
96	F	Damien Brunner	180 cm (5 ft 11 in)	83 kg (183 lb)	9 March 1986	Kloten	(United States) New Jersey Devils (NHL)

Group stage

Team	Pld	W	OTW	OTL	L	GF	GA	GD	Pts	Qualification
Sweden	3	3	0	0	0	10	5	+5	9	Quarterfinals
Switzerland	3	2	0	0	1	2	1	+1	6	
Czech Republic	3	1	0	0	2	6	7	−1	3	
Latvia	3	0	0	0	3	5	10	−5	0	

Source: ESPN

12 February 2014; 21:00	Latvia	0–1 (0–0, 0–0, 0–1)	Switzerland	Shayba Arena, Sochi; Attendance: 5,116

Game reference
Edgars Masaļskis	Goalies	Jonas Hiller	Referees: (Germany) Lars Brüggemann (United States) Brad Meier; Linesmen: (Canada) Derek Amell (Finland) Sakari Suominen
0–1 / 59:52 – S. Moser (M. Streit)			Referees: (Germany) Lars Brüggemann (United States) Brad Meier; Linesmen: (Canada) Derek Amell (Finland) Sakari Suominen
10 min	Penalties	6 min	Referees: (Germany) Lars Brüggemann (United States) Brad Meier; Linesmen: (Canada) Derek Amell (Finland) Sakari Suominen
21	Shots	39	Referees: (Germany) Lars Brüggemann (United States) Brad Meier; Linesmen: (Canada) Derek Amell (Finland) Sakari Suominen

14 February 2014; 16:30	Sweden	1–0 (0–0, 0–0, 1–0)	Switzerland	Bolshoy Ice Dome, Sochi; Attendance: 7,968

Game reference
Henrik Lundqvist	Goalies	Reto Berra	Referees: (Canada) Mike Leggo (Czech Republic) Vladimír Šindler; Linesmen: (Canada) Greg Devorski (Finland) Sakari Suominen
D. Alfredsson (E. Karlsson, P. Berglund) – 52:39 / 1–0			Referees: (Canada) Mike Leggo (Czech Republic) Vladimír Šindler; Linesmen: (Canada) Greg Devorski (Finland) Sakari Suominen
4 min	Penalties	8 min	Referees: (Canada) Mike Leggo (Czech Republic) Vladimír Šindler; Linesmen: (Canada) Greg Devorski (Finland) Sakari Suominen
31	Shots	26	Referees: (Canada) Mike Leggo (Czech Republic) Vladimír Šindler; Linesmen: (Canada) Greg Devorski (Finland) Sakari Suominen

15 February 2014; 21:00	Switzerland	1–0 (1–0, 0–0, 0–0)	Czech Republic	Bolshoy Ice Dome, Sochi; Attendance: 10,253

Game reference
Jonas Hiller	Goalies	Ondřej Pavelec	Referees: (Germany) Daniel Piechaczek (Canada) Kevin Pollock; Linesmen: (Canada) Brad Kovachik (United States) Chris Woodworth
S. Bodenmann (D. Hollenstein, K. Romy) – 14:10 / 1–0			Referees: (Germany) Daniel Piechaczek (Canada) Kevin Pollock; Linesmen: (Canada) Brad Kovachik (United States) Chris Woodworth
10 min	Penalties	6 min	Referees: (Germany) Daniel Piechaczek (Canada) Kevin Pollock; Linesmen: (Canada) Brad Kovachik (United States) Chris Woodworth
26	Shots	26	Referees: (Germany) Daniel Piechaczek (Canada) Kevin Pollock; Linesmen: (Canada) Brad Kovachik (United States) Chris Woodworth

Qualification playoffs

18 February 2014; 21:00	Switzerland	1–3 (0–2, 1–0, 0–1)	Latvia	Bolshoy Ice Dome, Sochi; Attendance: 7,912

Game reference

Jonas Hiller
Goalies
Edgars Masaļskis
Referees:
(Canada) Mike Leggo
(Finland) Jyri Rönn
Linesmen:
(Canada) Brad Kovachik
(Germany) André Schrader

	0–1	8:38 – O. Bārtulis (K. Daugaviņš, Z. Girgensons)
	0–2	11:19 – L. Dārziņš (M. Rēdlihs) (PP)
M. Plüss (R. Suri) – 35:01	1–2
	1–3	59:00 – L. Dārziņš (V. Pavlovs, E. Masaļskis) (EN)

4 min
Penalties
2 min
33
Shots
22

=== Women's tournament ===
Roster

The following is the Swiss roster in the women's ice hockey tournament of the 2014 Winter Olympics.

No.	Pos.	Name	Height	Weight	Birthdate	Birthplace	2013–14 team
1	G	Janine Alder	161 cm (5 ft 3 in)	53 kg (117 lb)	5 July 1995	Urnäsch	(Switzerland) EHC Winterthur (Elite Jr. B)
2	F	Katrin Nabholz	168 cm (5 ft 6 in)	56 kg (123 lb)	3 April 1986	Zürich	(Switzerland) ZSC Lions (LKA)
3	D	Sarah Forster	169 cm (5 ft 7 in)	55 kg (121 lb)	19 May 1993	Berneck	(Switzerland) HC Ajoie (Elite Jr. B)
6	D	Julia Marty	169 cm (5 ft 7 in)	69 kg (152 lb)	16 April 1988	Rothenthurm	(Sweden) Linkopings HC (RIKS)
7	F	Lara Stalder	166 cm (5 ft 5 in)	60 kg (130 lb)	15 May 1994	Lucerne	(United States) Minnesota Duluth Bulldogs (NCAA)
9	F	Stefanie Marty	168 cm (5 ft 6 in)	72 kg (159 lb)	16 April 1988	Rothenthurm	(Sweden) Linkopings HC (RIKS)
10	D	Nicole Bullo	160 cm (5 ft 3 in)	56 kg (123 lb)	18 July 1987	Claro	(Switzerland) HC Lugano (LKA)
11	D	Angela Frautschi	169 cm (5 ft 7 in)	73 kg (161 lb)	5 June 1987	Saanen	(Switzerland) ZSC Lions (LKA)
13	F	Sara Benz	163 cm (5 ft 4 in)	55 kg (121 lb)	25 August 1992	Kloten	(Switzerland) ZSC Lions (LKA)
14	F	Evelina Raselli	170 cm (5 ft 7 in)	64 kg (141 lb)	3 May 1992	Poschiavo	(Switzerland) HC Lugano (LKA)
16	F	Nina Waidacher	170 cm (5 ft 7 in)	65 kg (143 lb)	23 August 1992	Arosa	(United States) St. Scholastica Saints (NCAA)
17	F	Jessica Lutz	174 cm (5 ft 9 in)	65 kg (143 lb)	24 May 1989	Thal	(United States) Ronin (KCIHL)
21	D	Laura Benz	172 cm (5 ft 8 in)	63 kg (139 lb)	25 August 1992	Kloten	(Switzerland) ZSC Lions (LKA)
22	D	Livia Altmann	165 cm (5 ft 5 in)	64 kg (141 lb)	13 December 1994	Glarus Süd	(Switzerland) ZSC Lions (LKA)
25	F	Alina Müller	162 cm (5 ft 4 in)	50 kg (110 lb)	12 March 1998	Lengnau	(Switzerland) EHC Winterthur (Novizen Elite)
28	G	Sophie Anthamatten	171 cm (5 ft 7 in)	72 kg (159 lb)	26 July 1991	Saas-Grund	(Switzerland) EHC Saastal (1. Liga)
41	G	Florence Schelling	174 cm (5 ft 9 in)	65 kg (143 lb)	9 March 1989	Schaffhausen	(Switzerland) EHC Bülach (1. Liga)
61	F	Romy Eggimann	157 cm (5 ft 2 in)	54 kg (119 lb)	29 September 1995	Sumiswald	(Switzerland) HC Lugano (LKA)
63	F	Anja Stiefel	160 cm (5 ft 3 in)	60 kg (130 lb)	9 August 1990	Wil	(Switzerland) HC Lugano (LKA)
88	F	Phoebe Stanz	163 cm (5 ft 4 in)	62 kg (137 lb)	7 January 1994	Zetzwil	(United States) Yale Bulldogs (NCAA)
92	D	Sandra Thalmann	163 cm (5 ft 4 in)	68 kg (150 lb)	18 December 1992	Basel	(Switzerland) SC Reinach (LKA)

Group stage

Team	Pld	W	OTW	OTL	L	GF	GA	GD	Pts	Qualification
Canada	3	3	0	0	0	11	2	+9	9	Semifinals
United States	3	2	0	0	1	14	4	+10	6	Semifinals
Finland	3	0	1	0	2	5	9	−4	2	Quarterfinals
Switzerland	3	0	0	1	2	3	18	−15	1	Quarterfinals

Source: IIHF

8 February 2014; 17:00	Canada	5–0 (2–0, 3–0, 0–0)	Switzerland	Shayba Arena, Sochi; Attendance: 4,386

Game reference

Charline Labonté
Goalies
Florence Schelling
Referee:
(Norway) Aina Hove
Linesmen:
(United States) Alicia Hanrahan
(Slovakia) Michaela Kúdelová

J. Larocque (N. Spooner) – 01:25	1–0
T. Watchorn (R. Johnston) – 06:30	2–0
H. Wickenheiser (SH) – 23:54	3–0
M-P. Poulin (J. Hefford, R. Johnston) – 32:28	4–0
R. Johnston (M-P. Poulin) – 36:10	5–0

2 min
Penalties
4 min
69
Shots
14

10 February 2014; 14:00	United States	9–0 (5–0, 1–0, 3–0)	Switzerland	Shayba Arena, Sochi; Attendance: 3,812

Game reference

Molly Schaus
Goalies
Florence Schelling
Referee:
(Canada) Melanie Bordeleau
Linesmen:
(Canada) Denise Caughey
(France) Charlotte Girard

M. Lamoureux (J. Lamoureux, M. Duggan) – 09:20	1–0
B. Decker (A. Kessel, H. Knight) – 10:07	2–0
A. Kessel (K. Coyne) – 10:15	3–0
H. Knight (K. Stack, J. Chu) – 14:23	4–0
A. Kessel (B. Decker, K. Coyne) (PP) – 15:42	5–0
M. Lamoureux (J. Lamoureux, L. Stecklein) – 33:26	6–0
K. Coyne (K. Stack) – 40:49	7–0
K. Coyne (A. Kessel, M. Bozek) – 43:59	8–0
A. Carpenter (J. Pucci) – 55:39	9–0

4 min
Penalties
8 min
53
Shots
10

12 February 2014; 12:00	Switzerland	3–4 OT (0–2, 2–1, 1–0) (OT 0–1)	Finland	Shayba Arena, Sochi; Attendance: 4,211

Game reference

Florence Schelling
Goalies
Noora Räty
Referee:
(United States) Erin Blair
Linesmen:
(United States) Laura Johnson
(Slovakia) Michaela Kúdelová

	0–1	07:56 – J. Hiirikoski (M. Jalosuo, M. Karvinen)
	0–2	09:55 – M. Karvinen, (S. Tapani, A. Kilponen)
23:28 – R. Eggimann (N. Bullo)	1–2
28:00 – P. Stanz (J. Lutz) (PP)	2–2
	2–3	35:31 – M. Karvinen (S. Tapani, J. Hiirikoski) (PP)
56:25 – S. Marty (N. Bullo) (PP)	3–3
	3–4	62:38 – J. Hiirikoski (L. Välimäki, A. Kilponen)

31 min
Penalties
12 min
27
Shots
34

Quarterfinal

15 February 2014; 16:30	Switzerland	2–0 (1–0, 0–0, 1–0)	Russia	Shayba Arena, Sochi; Attendance: 4,962

Game reference
Florence Schelling	Goalies	Anna Prugova	Referee: (United Kingdom) Joy Tottman; Linesmen: (Sweden) Therese Bjorkman (Canada) Denise Caughey
S. Marty (A. Müller, S. Thalmann) – 10:46 / 1–0; L. Stalder (N. Bullo) (ENG) – 59:39 / 2–0			Referee: (United Kingdom) Joy Tottman; Linesmen: (Sweden) Therese Bjorkman (Canada) Denise Caughey
8 min	Penalties	2 min	Referee: (United Kingdom) Joy Tottman; Linesmen: (Sweden) Therese Bjorkman (Canada) Denise Caughey
27	Shots	41	Referee: (United Kingdom) Joy Tottman; Linesmen: (Sweden) Therese Bjorkman (Canada) Denise Caughey

Semifinal

17 February 2014; 21:00	Canada	3–1 (3–0, 0–1, 0–0)	Switzerland	Shayba Arena, Sochi; Attendance: 3,378

Game reference

Shannon Szabados
Goalies
Florence Schelling
Referee:
(United States) Erin Blair
Linesmen:
(United States) Alicia Hanrahan
(Czech Republic) Ilona Novotná

N. Spooner (H. Wickenheiser) – 07:29	1–0
N. Spooner (C. Ward, H. Wickenheiser) (PP) – 11:10	2–0
M. Daoust (J. Wakefield) – 11:33	3–0
	3–1	25:14 – J. Lutz (S. Benz, L. Benz) (PP)

12 min
Penalties
10 min
48
Shots
22

Bronze medal game

20 February 2014; 16:00	(bronze) Switzerland	4–3 (0–1, 0–1, 4–1)	Sweden	Bolshoy Ice Dome, Sochi; Attendance: 8,263

Game reference

Florence Schelling
Goalies
Valentina Lizana Wallner
Referee:
(Germany) Nicole Hertrich
Linesmen:
(Canada) Denise Caughey
(United States) Alicia Hanrahan

	0–1	14:00 – M. Löwenhielm (M. Lindh, C. Östberg)
	0–2	38:58 – E. Johansson (C. Östberg)
S. Benz (S. Forster) – 41:18	1–2
P. Stanz (A. Müller) (PP) – 46:13	2–2
J. Lutz (L. Stalder, L. Benz) – 53:43	3–2
A. Müller (ENG) – 58:53	4–2
	4–3	59:16 – P. Winberg (J. Asserholt, E. Grahm) (EA)

10 min
Penalties
4 min
26
Shots
31

== Luge ==
Switzerland qualified two athletes (one man and one woman) in the luge.

Athlete	Event	Run 1		Run 2		Run 3		Run 4		Total	
Athlete	Event	Time	Rank	Time	Rank	Time	Rank	Time	Rank	Time	Rank
Gregory Carigiet	Men's singles	52.775	=11	52.579	8	52.274	12	52.167	8	3:29.795	12
Martina Kocher	Women's singles	50.560	9	50.454	6	50.593	8	50.559	8	3:22.166	9

== Nordic combined ==
Athlete	Event	Ski jumping			Cross-country		Total	
Athlete	Event	Distance	Points	Rank	Time	Rank	Time	Rank
Tim Hug	Normal hill/10 km	91.5	106.5	38	24:09.4	23	25:49.4	27
Tim Hug	Large hill/10 km	123.5	102.3	25	23:09.5	21	24:56.5	24

== Skeleton ==
Athlete	Event	Run 1		Run 2		Run 3		Run 4		Total	
Athlete	Event	Time	Rank	Time	Rank	Time	Rank	Time	Rank	Time	Rank
Marina Gilardoni	Women's	59.77	17	59.79	18	58.77	16	58.41	7	3:56.74	18

== Ski jumping ==
Athlete	Event	Qualification			First round			Final			Total	
Athlete	Event	Distance	Points	Rank	Distance	Points	Rank	Distance	Points	Rank	Points	Rank
Simon Ammann	Men's normal hill	BYE			97.5	125.5	16 Q	98.5	121.1	18	246.6	17
Simon Ammann	Men's large hill	BYE			125.5	113.2	29 Q	131.0	126.0	10	239.2	23
Gregor Deschwanden	Men's normal hill	99.0	111.7	23 Q	100.5	120.7	27	96.5	118.6	21	239.3	25
Gregor Deschwanden	Men's large hill	120.0	108.2	14 Q	134.5	130.3	6 Q	123.0	117.1	25	247.4	14
Bigna Windmüller	Women's normal hill	—N/a			96.0	112.3	20	96.0	108.4	18	220.7	18

== Snowboarding ==
24 Swiss snowboarders were competing in 5 disciplines, including the new events of parallel slalom and slopestyle. It will be the largest team competing in Sochi along with Canada and the United States. The two-time Olympic champion Philipp Schoch will be competing in his third Olympics, while his brother Simon Schoch, the 2006 silver medalist, will be participating in his fourth consecutive Games.

Alpine
Men

Athlete	Event	Qualification		Round of 16	Quarterfinal	Semifinal	Final	
Athlete	Event	Time	Rank	Opposition Time	Opposition Time	Opposition Time	Opposition Time	Rank
Kaspar Flütsch	Giant slalom	1:37.82	7 Q	S Schoch (SUI); L +0.22	did not advance			
Kaspar Flütsch	Slalom	59.38	8 Q	Fischnaller (ITA); L +0.11	did not advance			
Nevin Galmarini	Giant slalom	1:39.07	12 Q	Karl (AUT); W −0.10	Marguč (SLO); W −0.09	Kosir (SLO); W −1.36	Wild (RUS); L +2.14	2nd place, silver medalist(s)
Nevin Galmarini	Slalom	59.13	7 Q	Dufour (FRA); W DSQ	Košir (SLO); L +0.20	did not advance		
Philipp Schoch	Giant slalom	1:37.85	9 Q	Košir (SLO); L +1.17	did not advance			
Philipp Schoch	Slalom	DSQ		did not advance				
Simon Schoch	Giant slalom	1:38.46	10 Q	Flütsch (SUI); W −0.22	Wild (RUS); L +4.19	did not advance		
Simon Schoch	Slalom	59.08	6 Q	March (ITA); L DSQ	did not advance			

Women

Athlete	Event	Qualification		Round of 16	Quarterfinal	Semifinal	Final	
Athlete	Event	Time	Rank	Opposition Time	Opposition Time	Opposition Time	Opposition Time	Rank
Ladina Jenny	Giant slalom	1:50.41	12 Q	Leeson (CAN); L +0.30	did not advance			
Ladina Jenny	Slalom	1:05.96	24	did not advance				
Patrizia Kummer	Giant slalom	1:46.62	2 Q	Tudegesheva (RUS); W −0.76	Ledecká (CZE); W −0.30	Zavarzina (RUS); W DSQ	Takeuchi (JPN); W −7.32	1st place, gold medalist(s)
Patrizia Kummer	Slalom	1:03.82	3 Q	Kober (GER); L +0.10	did not advance			
Stefanie Müller	Giant slalom	1:51.98	17	did not advance				
Stefanie Müller	Slalom	1:05.64	18	did not advance				
Julie Zogg	Giant slalom	1:47.11	3 Q	Lavigne (CAN); L +0.12	did not advance			
Julie Zogg	Slalom	1:03.92	4 Q	Takeuchi (JPN); W DSQ	Dujmovits (AUT); L DSQ	did not advance		

Freestyle
Halfpipe

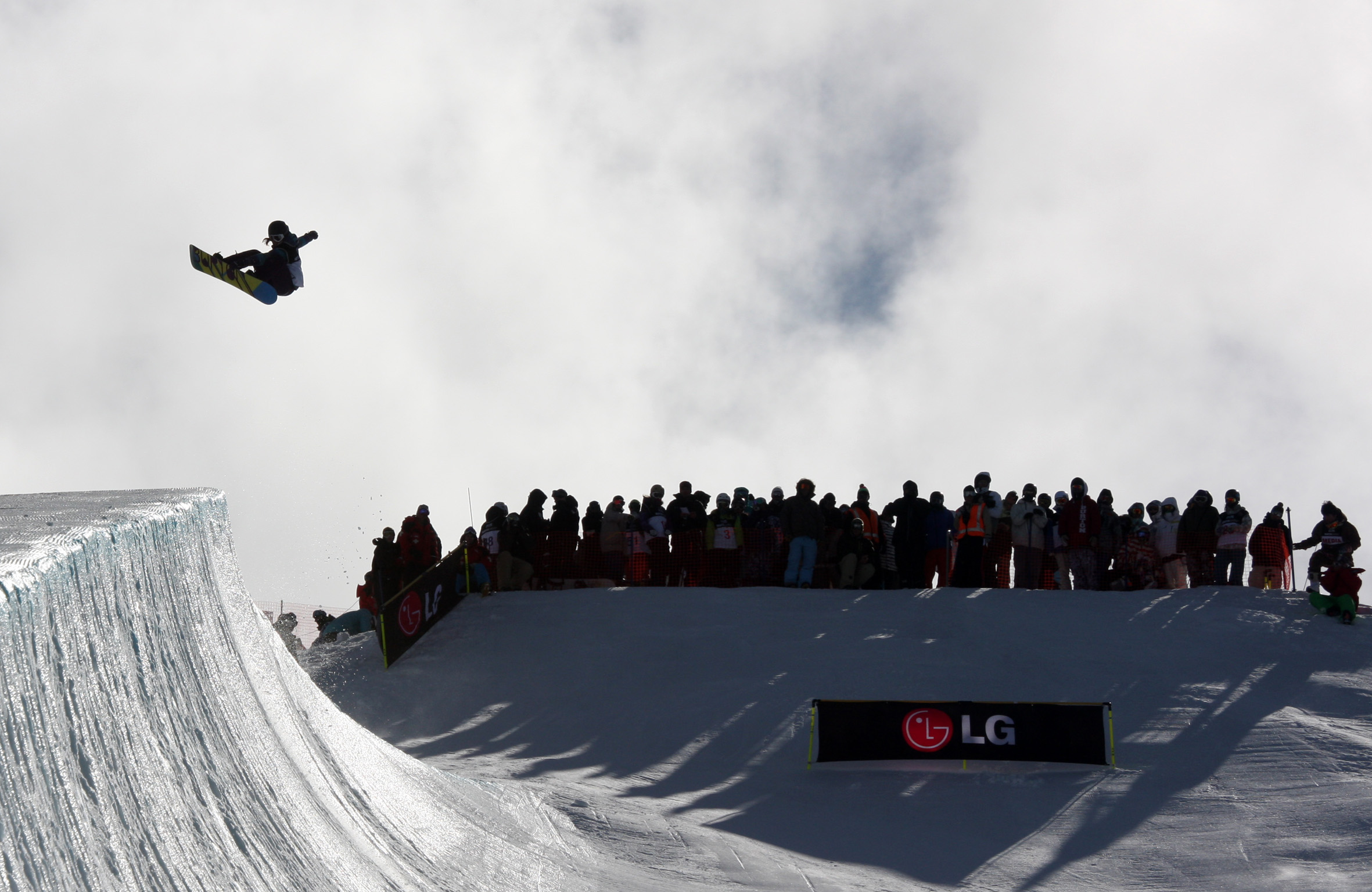
Nadja Purtschert

Athlete	Event	Qualification				Semifinal				Final			
Athlete	Event	Run 1	Run 2	Best	Rank	Run 1	Run 2	Best	Rank	Run 1	Run 2	Best	Rank
David Hablützel	Men's halfpipe	48.75	81.00	81.00	3 QF	BYE				80.75	88.50	88.50	5
Christian Haller	Men's halfpipe	74.00	83.75	83.75	2 QF	BYE				46.25	51.50	51.50	11
Iouri Podladtchikov	Men's halfpipe	15.00	82.00	82.00	8 QS	87.50	41.25	87.50	1 Q	86.50	94.75	94.75	1st place, gold medalist(s)
Jan Scherrer	Men's halfpipe	43.50	69.75	69.75	9 QS	DNS				did not advance			
Ursina Haller	Women's halfpipe	69.00	74.75	74.75	5 QS	74.50	43.00	74.50	4 Q	48.75	26.75	48.75	12
Nadja Purtschert	Women's halfpipe	47.50	20.75	47.50	12	did not advance							
Verena Rohrer	Women's halfpipe	34.50	31.50	34.50	13	did not advance							

Qualification Legend: QF – Qualify directly to final; QS – Qualify to semifinal

Slopestyle

Athlete	Event	Qualification				Semifinal				Final			
Athlete	Event	Run 1	Run 2	Best	Rank	Run 1	Run 2	Best	Rank	Run 1	Run 2	Best	Rank
Lucien Koch	Men's slopestyle	32.00	29.25	32.00	12 QS	16.25	20.75	20.75	20	did not advance			
Jan Scherrer	Men's slopestyle	74.50	18.75	74.50	10 QS	64.25	23.50	64.25	11	did not advance			
Sina Candrian	Women's slopestyle	58.25	36.50	58.25	9 QS	84.25	81.50	84.25	2 QF	77.25	87.00	87.00	4
Isabel Derungs	Women's slopestyle	82.50	87.50	87.50	1 QF	BYE				58.50	15.25	58.50	8
Elena Könz	Women's slopestyle	86.25	38.00	86.25	3 QF	BYE				24.50	54.50	54.50	9

Qualification Legend: QF – Qualify directly to final; QS – Qualify to semifinal

Snowboard cross

Athlete	Event	Seeding		Round of 16	Quarterfinal	Semifinal	Final	
Athlete	Event	Time	Rank	Position	Position	Position	Position	Rank
Marvin James	Men's snowboard cross	CAN		3 Q	DNF	did not advance		=21
Tim Watter	Men's snowboard cross	CAN		2 Q	DSQ	did not advance		=21
Sandra Gerber	Women's snowboard cross	1:24.10	10	—N/a	4	did not advance		13
Simona Meiler	Women's snowboard cross	1:25.17	19	—N/a	2 Q	DSQ*	4	10

Qualification legend: FA – Qualify to medal round; FB – Qualify to consolation round
* Qualify immediately to consolation round after being disqualified in the semifinals
