= Freestyle skiing at the 2018 Winter Olympics – Women's halfpipe =

Women's halfpipe at the XXIII Olympic Winter Games
- Venue: Bogwang Phoenix Park, Pyeongchang, South Korea
- Dates: 19 February (qualification); 20 February (final)
- Competitors: 24 from 13 nations
- Winning score: 95.80

Medalists
1st place, gold medalist(s)		Cassie Sharpe	Canada
2nd place, silver medalist(s)		Marie Martinod	France
3rd place, bronze medalist(s)		Brita Sigourney	United States

The Women's halfpipe event in freestyle skiing at the 2018 Winter Olympics took place on 19 and 20 February 2018 at the Bogwang Phoenix Park, Pyeongchang, South Korea.

== Qualification ==
The top 30 athletes in the Olympic quota allocation list qualified, with a maximum of four athletes per National Olympic Committee (NOC) allowed. All athletes qualifying must also have placed in the top 30 of a FIS World Cup event or the FIS Freestyle Ski and Snowboarding World Championships 2017 during the qualification period (July 1, 2016 to January 21, 2018) and also have a minimum of 50 FIS points to compete. If the host country, South Korea at the 2018 Winter Olympics did not qualify, their chosen athlete would displace the last qualified athlete, granted all qualification criteria were met.

== Results ==
=== Qualification ===
The qualification was held on 19 February at 10:00.

Rank	Start Order	Bib	Name	Country	Run 1	Run 2	Best	Notes
1	8	3	Cassie Sharpe	Canada	93.00	93.40	93.40	Q
2	10	7	Marie Martinod	France	91.60	92.00	92.00	Q
3	5	1	Brita Sigourney	United States	90.60	90.60	90.60	Q
4	7	6	Annalisa Drew	United States	85.40	86.00	86.00	Q
5	2	13	Ayana Onozuka	Japan	74.60	84.80	84.80	Q
6	15	4	Maddie Bowman	United States	83.60	83.80	83.80	Q
7	16	11	Sabrina Cakmakli	Germany	81.80	31.40	81.80	Q
8	1	2	Zhang Kexin	China	80.60	81.00	81.00	Q
9	20	22	Rowan Cheshire	Great Britain	74.00	71.40	74.00	Q
10	11	8	Valeriya Demidova	Olympic Athletes from Russia	71.00	73.60	73.60	Q
11	17	24	Rosalind Groenewoud	Canada	73.20	72.80	73.20	Q
12	18	17	Anaïs Caradeux	France	25.00	72.80	72.80	Q
13	6	12	Elisabeth Gram	Austria	72.20	20.00	72.20	
14	3	10	Saori Suzuki	Japan	69.20	71.80	71.80	
15	13	5	Devin Logan	United States	71.60	25.60	71.60	
16	19	20	Janina Kuzma	New Zealand	67.80	48.60	67.80	
17	4	14	Molly Summerhayes	Great Britain	60.80	66.00	66.00	
18	12	16	Jang Yu-jin	South Korea	64.40	60.00	64.40	
19	21	21	Chai Hong	China	58.00	63.60	63.60	
20	9	15	Wu Meng	China	53.40	61.00	61.00	
21	23	18	Britt Hawes	New Zealand	52.20	57.40	57.40	
22	14	9	Yurie Watabe	Japan	21.20	56.60	56.60	
23	22	19	Laila Friis-Salling	Denmark	45.00	11.80	45.00	
24	24	23	Elizabeth Swaney	Hungary	30.00	31.40	31.40	

=== Final ===
The final was held on 20 February at 10:30.

Rank	Bib	Name	Country	Run 1	Run 2	Run 3	Best	Notes
1st place, gold medalist(s)	3	Cassie Sharpe	Canada	94.40	95.80	42.00	95.80	
2nd place, silver medalist(s)	7	Marie Martinod	France	92.20	92.60	23.20	92.60	
3rd place, bronze medalist(s)	1	Brita Sigourney	United States	89.80	88.60	91.60	91.60	
4	6	Annalisa Drew	United States	86.80	73.00	90.80	90.80	
5	13	Ayana Onozuka	Japan	50.80	77.20	82.20	82.20	
6	8	Valeriya Demidova	Olympic Athletes from Russia	79.00	80.60	77.60	80.60	
7	22	Rowan Cheshire	Great Britain	75.40	17.80	13.60	75.40	
8	11	Sabrina Cakmakli	Germany	74.20	57.60	20.40	74.20	
9	2	Zhang Kexin	China	73.00	55.40	71.00	73.00	
10	24	Rosalind Groenewoud	Canada	70.60	67.80	66.60	70.60	
11	4	Maddie Bowman	United States	25.80	26.40	27.00	27.00	
12	17	Anaïs Caradeux	France	DNS	DNS	DNS	DNS	

== Qualification controversies ==
Elizabeth Swaney, who represented Hungary, qualified for the Olympics using "a loophole", by attending many World Cup events and just finishing the runs without falling. This has been called a "mockery" and her being labelled as a "scammer" by some people, while being seen by some people as "[a person who has] put in the time and effort to be here" by others.
