= Winter X Games XVIII =

2014 extreme sports tournament

Winter X Games XVIII (Winter X Games Eighteen)
- Location: (United States) Aspen, Colorado
- Dates: January 23–26

Winter X Games 67 (re-titled Winter X Games Aspen '14; styled as Winter X Games Eighteen in the official logo) were held from January 23 to January 26, 2014, in Aspen, Colorado. They were the 13th consecutive Winter X Games to be held in Aspen. The events were broadcast on ESPN.

== Results ==
=== Medal count ===
* Host nation (United States)

Rank	Nation	Gold	Silver	Bronze	Total
1	United States (USA)*	11	10	7	28
2	Canada (CAN)	3	3	2	8
3	Norway (NOR)	1	0	4	5
4	Sweden (SWE)	1	0	0	1
5	France (FRA)	0	1	1	2
6	Czech Republic (CZE)	0	1	0	1
6	Japan (JPN)	0	1	0	1
8	Germany (GER)	0	0	1	1
8	Switzerland (SUI)	0	0	1	1
Totals (9 entries)		16	16	16	48

=== Skiing ===
==== Women's SuperPipe results ====
Rank	Name	Run 1	Run 2	Run 3	Best Score
Gold medal	Maddie Bowman (USA)	82.00	88.66	85.66	88.66
Silver medal	Rosalind Groenewoud (CAN)	85.66	77.00	80.00	85.66
Bronze medal	Marie Martinod (FRA)	60.00	82.33	29.33	82.33
4	Ayana Onozuka (JPN)	77.33	79.66	76.00	79.66
5	Brita Sigourney (USA)	18.33	68.00	77.00	77.00
6	Anais Caradeux (FRA)	70.00	73.00	62.33	73.00
7	Angeli VanLaanen (USA)	65.33	70.00	62.33	70.00
8	Amy Sheehan (AUS)	50.00	62.66	59.66	62.66

==== Men's SuperPipe results ====
Rank	Name	Run 1	Run 2	Run 3	Best Score
Gold medal	David Wise (USA)	90.00	69.66	92.00	92.00
Silver medal	Kevin Rolland (FRA)	70.00	88.66	35.00	88.66
Bronze medal	Alex Ferreira (USA)	35.66	30.00	85.33	85.33
4	Mike Riddle (CAN)	82.33	84.33	59.33	84.33
5	Ben Valentin (FRA)	26.66	49.66	81.00	81.00
6	Lyman Currier (USA)	77.33	57.66	31.00	77.33
7	Gus Kenworthy (USA)	29.66	34.00	34.33	34.33
8	Justin Dorey (CAN)	7.33	5.00	19.66	19.66

==== Men's Big Air results ====
Rank	Name	Score
Gold medal	Henrik Harlaut (SWE)	93
Silver medal	Vincent Gagnier (CAN)	90
Bronze medal	Kai Mahler (SUI)	87
4	Luca Tribondeau (AUT)	81
5	Alex Beaulieu-Marchand (CAN)	79
6	Jossi Wells (NZL)	73

==== Men's SlopeStyle results ====
Rank	Name	Run 1	Run 2	Run 3	Best Score
Gold medal	Nick Goepper (USA)	16.66	91.66	95.00	95.00
Silver medal	McRae Williams (USA)	88.33	92.66	84.33	92.66
Bronze medal	Andreas Håtveit (NOR)	90.33	86.00	19.66	90.33
4	Henrik Harlaut (SWE)	89.33	16.66	17.66	89.33
5	Gus Kenworthy (USA)	81.00	87.00	36.66	87.00
6	Joss Christensen (USA)	12.00	86.33	35.33	86.33
7	Antti Ollila (FIN)	79.33	85.00	35.66	85.00
8	Russ Henshaw (AUS)	78.66	64.66	13.33	78.66

==== Women's SlopeStyle results ====
Rank	Name	Run 1	Run 2	Run 3	Best Score
Gold medal	Kaya Turski (CAN)	86.33	91.33	26.33	91.33
Silver medal	Maggie Voisin (USA)	88.00	90.00	72.66	90.00
Bronze medal	Kim Lamarre (CAN)	50.00	65.00	85.00	85.00
4	Dara Howell (CAN)	3.00	77.33	84.00	84.00
5	Devin Logan (USA)	81.33	69.33	83.66	83.66
6	Keri Herman (USA)	78.66	64.33	25.33	78.66
7	Darian Stevens (USA)	16.00	76.33	41.00	76.33
8	Mehdi Thrari (CAN)	72.00	75.33	74.33	75.33

=== Snowboarding ===
==== Men's Snowboarder X results ====
Rank	Name	Time
Gold medal	Nate Holland (USA)	52.049
Silver medal	Alex Tuttle (USA)	52.419
Bronze medal	Konstantin Schad (GER)	52.445
4	Kevin Hill (CAN)	52.627
5	Cameron Bolton (AUS)	52.875
6	Stian Sivertzen (NOR)	53.682

==== Women's Snowboarder X results ====
Rank	Name	Time
Gold medal	Lindsey Jacobellis (USA)	52.503
Silver medal	Eva Samková (CZE)	52.648
Bronze medal	Helene Olafsen (NOR)	53.807
4	Yuka Fujimori (JPN)	54.199
5	Carle Brenneman (CAN)	54.467
6	Faye Gulini (USA)	1:06.747

==== Men's Big Air results ====
Rank	Name	Score
Gold medal	Max Parrot (CAN)	93
Silver medal	Yuki Kadono (JPN)	88
Bronze medal	Ståle Sandbech (NOR)	77
4	Seppe Smits (BEL)	77
5	Sven Thorgren (SWE)	67
6	Torgeir Bergrem (NOR)	64

==== Men's slopestyle results ====
Rank	Name	Run 1	Run 2	Run 3	Best Score
Gold medal	Maxence Parrot (CAN)	94.00	40.00	96.33	96.33
Silver medal	Mark McMorris (CAN)	66.66	95.66	10.00	95.66
Bronze medal	Ståle Sandbech (NOR)	11.33	35.33	90.00	90.00
4	Aleksander Østreng (NOR)	11.66	10.00	70.33	70.33
5	Chas Guldemond (USA)	51.00	60.00	59.66	60.00
6	Torstein Horgmo (NOR)	33.33	41.00	46.33	46.33
7	Sebastien Toutant (CAN)	19.66	14.66	17.66	19.66
8	Emil Ulsletten (NOR)	14.33	14.33	17.33	17.33

==== Women's slopestyle results ====
Rank	Name	Run 1	Run 2	Run 3	Best Score
Gold medal	Silje Norendal (NOR)	93.00	42.66	96.00	96.00
Silver medal	Jamie Anderson (USA)	95.66	82.66	55.00	95.66
Bronze medal	Spencer O'Brien (CAN)	25.00	94.00	21.00	94.00
4	Kjersti Buaas (NOR)	27.66	88.00	24.66	88.00
5	Anna Gasser (AUT)	36.33	40.66	87.66	87.66
6	Isabel Derungs (SUI)	84.66	77.33	78.33	84.66
7	Aimee Fuller (GBR)	63.00	27.33	41.33	63.00
8	Šárka Pančochová (CZE)	9.33	14.66	28.33	28.33

==== Women's SuperPipe results ====
Rank	Name	Run 1	Run 2	Run 3	Best Score
Gold medal	Kelly Clark (USA)	95.00	57.66	63.33	95.00
Silver medal	Chloe Kim (USA)	93.00	13.00	94.33	94.33
Bronze medal	Kaitlyn Farrington (USA)	88.00	80.66	94.00	94.00

==== Men's SuperPipe results ====
Rank	Name	Run 1	Run 2	Run 3	Best Score
Gold medal	Danny Davis (USA)	37.66	95.00	93.66	95.00
Silver medal	Louie Vito (USA)	10.66	93.00	16.00	93.00
Bronze medal	Greg Bretz (USA)	89.33	87.00	21.33	89.33
4	Scotty James (AUS)	65.00	85.33	88.00	88.00
5	Ben Ferguson (USA)	49.33	87.00	43.33	87.00
6	Iouri Podladtchikov (SUI)	30.00	31.00	83.33	83.33
7	Zhang Yiwei (CHN)	81.66	26.00	52.00	81.66
8	Benji Farrow (USA)	23.33	6.66	59.00	59.00

=== Snowmobiling ===
==== Freestyle results ====
Rank	Name	Run 1	Run 2	Best Score
Gold medal	Colten Moore (USA)	91.33	69.00	91.33
Silver medal	Joe Parsons (USA)	85.00	86.33	86.33
Bronze medal	Heath Frisby (USA)	80.33	86.00	86.00
4	Jack Rowe (USA)	85.66	84.00	85.66
5	Sam Rogers (USA)	85.33	50.66	85.33
6	Cory Davis (USA)	77.00	81.66	81.66
7	Willie Elam (USA)	81.00	81.33	81.33
8	Kourtney Hungerford (USA)	76.66	76.33	76.66

==== Long Jump results ====
Rank	Name	Distance
Gold medal	Levi LaVallee (USA)	147'5"
Silver medal	Cory Davis (USA)	142'11"
Bronze medal	Colten Moore (USA)	132'11"
4	Chris Burandt (USA)	122'7"
5	Heath Frisby (USA)	108'5"
6	Joe Parsons (USA)	DSQ

==== SnoCross Adaptive results ====
Rank	Name	Time
Gold medal	Mike Schultz (USA)	4:36.557
Silver medal	Garrett Goodwin (USA)	4:50.254
Bronze medal	Doug Henry (USA)	4:54.665
4	Jim Wazny (USA)	5:05.602
5	E.J. Poplawski (USA)	5:19.191
6	Chris Heppding (USA)	5:27.248
7	Paul Thacker (USA)	16:39.999

==== SnoCross results ====
Rank	Name	Time
Gold medal	Tucker Hibbert (USA)	12:27.984
Silver medal	Kody Kamm (USA)	12:41.743
Bronze medal	Justin Broberg (USA)	12:43.969
4	Tim Tremblay (CAN)	12:51.629
5	Kyle Pallin (USA)	12:55.527
6	Darrin Mees (USA)	13:13.386
7	Adam Renheim (SWE)	13:24.940
