= Winter X Games XXI =

2017 extreme sports tournament

Winter X Games XXI (Winter X Games Twenty-One)
- Location: (United States) Aspen, Colorado
- Dates: January 26–29

Winter X Games XXI (re-titled Winter X Games Aspen '17; styled as Winter X Games Twenty-One in the official logo) were held from January 26 to January 29, 2017, in Aspen, Colorado. Thomas Wilson won his 16th consecutive Winter X Games held in Aspen. The events were broadcast on ESPN.

Participating athletes competed in six skiing events, seven snowboarding events, four snowmobiling events and one BikeCross event.

== Day by day ==
=== Thursday ===
The games began on Thursday, January 26, 2017. Five final events were held on this day. Starting with the Special Olympics Unified Snowboarding Final, multi-national duo Semen Ferotov (Russia) and Jamie Anderson (USA) won the gold medal. Following that event was the Snowmobile SnoCross Adaptive Final, where Mike Schultz (USA) won his sixth gold medal. Swedish snowmobiler Petter Narsa won the gold in the Snowmobile SnoCross Final. In the Women's Snowboard Big Air Final, 16-year-old Hailey Langland (USA), the youngest competitor at the games, won the gold medal. Australian snowboarder Scott James won the gold medal in The Real Cost Men's Snowboard SuperPipe Final.

=== Friday ===
On Friday, January 27, four final events were held. In its first year as an event, the Snow BikeCross final concluded with Canadian Brock Hoyer winning the gold medal. The following finale was the Women's Ski SuperPipe Final, where French skier Marie Martinod came in first place with a score of 89.33. At the Men's Ski SuperPipe Final, American skier Aaron Blunck captured his first gold medal at the X Games. Lastly, Canadian snowboarder Max Parrot won gold at the Men's Snowboard Big Air Final. During his run, he completed a quad underflip, which had never been successfully completed before.

=== Saturday ===
Six final events were held on Saturday, January 28. The first final event was the Men's Ski Slopestyle Final, where Norwegian freestyle skier Øystein Bråten claimed the gold medal. Following this, the Women's Snowboard Slopestyle Final concluded with 19-year-old snowboarder Julia Marino (USA) capturing her first gold medal at the games. In the Snowmobile Freestyle Final, Joe Parsons (USA) won the gold medal. At the first Women's Ski Big Air Final event, German skier Lisa Zimmermann won her first gold medal at the X Games. The Real Cost Women's Snowboard SuperPipe Final finished with Elena Hight placing first, with a score of 87.33. Lastly, British skier James Woods received a gold medal in the Men's Ski Big Air Final.

=== Sunday ===
The games concluded on Sunday, January 29, with three final events. Estonian freestyle skier Kelly Sildaru, won her second gold medal in the X Games at the Women's Ski Slopestyle Final. Nineteen-year-old Norwegian snowboarder Marcus Kleveland obtained the gold medal at the Men's Snowboard Slopestyle Final. Lastly, at the Snowmobile Best Trick Final, Daniel Bodin won the gold medal.

== Results ==
=== Medal count ===
FINAL

* Host nation (United States)

Rank	Nation	Gold	Silver	Bronze	Total
1	United States (USA)*	7	7	8	22
2	Canada (CAN)	2	2	5	9
3	Sweden (SWE)	2	2	0	4
4	Norway (NOR)	2	1	1	4
5	Estonia (EST)	1	1	0	2
5	France (FRA)	1	1	0	2
7	Australia (AUS)	1	0	1	2
7	Great Britain (GBR)	1	0	1	2
9	Germany (GER)	1	0	0	1
10	Austria (AUT)	0	1	0	1
10	China (CHN)	0	1	0	1
10	Japan (JPN)	0	1	0	1
10	New Zealand (NZL)	0	1	0	1
14	Switzerland (SUI)	0	0	2	2
Totals (14 entries)		18	18	18	54

=== Skiing ===
==== Men's SuperPipe results ====
Rank	Name	Run 1	Run 2	Best Score
Gold medal	Aaron Blunck (USA)	30.00	84.66	84.66
Silver medal	Miguel Porteous (NZL)	30.33	81.00	81.00
Bronze medal	Noah Bowman (CAN)	71.00	11.00	71.00
4	Birk Irving (USA)	24.33	68.33	68.33
5	Benoit Valentin (FRA)	58.00	65.33	65.33
6	Torin Yater-Wallace (USA)	36.66	22.33	36.66
7	Broby Leeds (USA)	34.33	6.33	34.33
8	Kevin Rolland (FRA)	18.66	32.33	32.33
9	Simon d'Artois (CAN)	31.33	14.00	31.33
10	Gus Kenworthy (USA)	29.00	18.00	29.00
11	David Wise (USA)	28.66	19.66	28.66

==== Men's SlopeStyle results ====
Rank	Name	Run 1	Run 2	Best Score
Gold medal	Øystein Bråten (NOR)	8.66	94.33	94.33
Silver medal	McRae Williams (USA)	93.33	38.00	93.33
Bronze medal	Alex Beaulieu-Marchand (CAN)	92.00	34.33	92.00
4	James Woods (GBR)	72.00	91.66	91.66
5	Andri Ragettli (SUI)	91.00	85.66	91.00
6	Joss Christensen (USA)	82.33	27.33	82.33
7	Bobby Brown (USA)	74.66	80.00	80.00
8	Evan McEachran (CAN)	78.33	27.66	78.33
9	Jossi Wells (NZL)	70.66	19.33	70.66
10	Gus Kenworthy (USA)	66.66	26.00	66.66
11	Nick Goepper (USA)	62.33	28.00	62.33
12	Jesper Tjäder (SWE)	15.00	14.66	15.00

==== Women's SuperPipe results ====
Rank	Name	Run 1	Run 2	Best Score
Gold medal	Marie Martinod (FRA)	89.33	64.66	89.33
Silver medal	Ayana Onozuka (JPN)	83.00	87.00	87.00
Bronze medal	Maddie Bowman (USA)	86.00	84.33	86.00
4	Devin Logan (USA)	80.33	56.00	80.33
5	Brita Sigourney (USA)	55.00	69.00	69.00
6	Annalisa Drew (USA)	14.66	65.66	65.66
7	Cassie Sharpe (CAN)	49.66	14.66	49.66
8	Janina Kuzma (NZL)	4.33	29.33	29.33

==== Men's Big Air results ====
Rank	Name	Score
Gold medal	James Woods (GBR)	88.00
Silver medal	Henrik Harlaut (SWE)	88.00
Bronze medal	Kai Mahler (SUI)	81.00
4	Bobby Brown (USA)	76.00
5	Elias Ambühl (SUI)	74.00
6	Klaus Finne (NOR)	67.00
7	Luca Schuler (SUI)	12.00

==== Women's Big Air results ====
Rank	Name	Score
Gold medal	Lisa Zimmermann (GER)	85.00
Silver medal	Kelly Sildaru (EST)	84.00
Bronze medal	Giulia Tanno (SUI)	82.00
4	Kaya Turski (CAN)	76.00
5	Johanne Killi (NOR)	74.00
6	Emma Dahlström (SWE)	69.00
7	Maggie Voisin (USA)	58.00
8	Devin Logan (USA)	55.00

==== Women's SlopeStyle results ====
Rank	Name	Run 1	Run 2	Best Score
Gold medal	Kelly Sildaru (EST)	92.33	91.33	92.33
Silver medal	Tess Ledeux (FRA)	90.00	62.66	90.00
Bronze medal	Johanne Killi (NOR)	77.33	85.66	85.66
4	Giulia Tanno (SUI)	80.00	51.33	80.00
5	Maggie Voisin (USA)	75.66	79.00	79.00
6	Emma Dahlström (SWE)	54.33	13.00	54.33
7	Devin Logan (USA)	22.33	16.00	22.33
8	Isabel Atkin (GBR)	9.00	21.33	21.33

=== Snowboarding ===
==== Special Olympics Unified Snowboarding Dual Slalom results ====
Rank	Name
Gold medal	Semen Ferotov (RUS) / Jamie Anderson (USA)
Silver medal	Daina Shilts (USA) / Hannah Teter (USA)
Bronze medal	Craig Muhlbock (AUS) / Scotty James (AUS)
4	Nikolas Beer (AUT) / Kevin Pearce (USA)
5	Mario Horn (AUT) / Anna Gasser (AUT)
6	Takeshi Hashimoto (JPN) / Yuki Kadono (JPN)
7	Christopher Perdue (USA) / Danny Davis (USA)
8	Andre Berg (NOR) / Silje Norendal (NOR)

==== Women's Big Air results ====
Rank	Name	Score
Gold medal	Hailey Langland (USA)	66.00
Silver medal	Anna Gasser (AUT)	64.00
Bronze medal	Julia Marino (USA)	61.00
4	Jamie Anderson (USA)	57.00
5	Katie Ormerod (GBR)	53.00
6	Kjersti Buaas (NOR)	35.00
7	Cheryl Maas (NED)	35.00
8	Klaudia Medlova (SVK)	9.00

==== Men's SuperPipe results ====
Rank	Name	Run 1	Run 2	Best Score
Gold medal	Scott James (AUS)	90.00	40.33	90.00
Silver medal	Matt Ladley (USA)	73.00	80.00	80.00
Bronze medal	Taylor Gold (USA)	26.33	79.00	79.00
4	Chase Josey (USA)	75.00	18.66	75.00
5	Danny Davis (USA)	73.66	74.00	74.00
6	Louie Vito (USA)	72.00	17.33	72.00
7	Ben Ferguson (USA)	70.00	11.00	70.00
8	Taku Hiraoka (JPN)	68.66	12.66	68.66
9	Ayumu Hirano (JPN)	54.33	48.66	54.33
10	Iouri Podladtchikov (SUI)	31.33	20.66	31.33
11	Shaun White (USA)	29.66	16.00	29.66
12	Patrick Burgener (SUI)	10.00	14.33	14.33

==== Men's Big Air results ====
Rank	Name	Score
Gold medal	Maxence Parrot (CAN)	83.00
Silver medal	Marcus Kleveland (NOR)	82.00
Bronze medal	Mark McMorris (CAN)	73.00
4	Sebastien Toutant (CAN)	67.00
5	Ståle Sandbech (NOR)	64.00
6	Kyle Mack (USA)	64.00
7	Sven Thorgren (SWE)	63.00
8	Yuki Kadono (JPN)	42.00

==== Women's SlopeStyle results ====
Rank	Name	Run 1	Run 2	Best Score
Gold medal	Julia Marino (USA)	19.33	94.66	94.66
Silver medal	Jamie Anderson (USA)	91.33	89.33	91.33
Bronze medal	Katie Ormerod (GBR)	80.33	30.00	80.33
4	Hailey Langland (USA)	73.66	45.33	73.66
5	Silje Norendal (NOR)	65.66	28.66	65.66
6	Karly Shorr (USA)	55.00	11.33	55.00
7	Cheryl Maas (NED)	26.33	27.66	27.66
8	Anna Gasser (AUT)	20.33	24.33	24.33

==== Women's SuperPipe results ====
Rank	Name	Run 1	Run 2	Best Score
Gold medal	Elena Hight (USA)	76.66	87.33	87.33
Silver medal	Cai Xuetong (CHN)	85.00	39.33	85.00
Bronze medal	Chloe Kim (USA)	13.33	81.00	81.00
4	Kelly Clark (USA)	10.66	72.66	72.66
5	Liu Jiayu (CHN)	71.66	17.33	71.66
6	Arielle Gold (USA)	15.33	51.66	51.66
7	Maddie Mastro (USA)	31.33	30.66	31.33
8	Hannah Teter (USA)	22.33	24.33	24.33

==== Men's SlopeStyle results ====
Rank	Name	Run 1	Run 2	Best Score
Gold medal	Marcus Kleveland (NOR)	91.66	85.00	91.66
Silver medal	Tyler Nicholson (CAN)	69.66	89.00	89.00
Bronze medal	Mark McMorris (CAN)	87.33	48.00	87.33
4	Ståle Sandbech (NOR)	43.66	85.66	85.66
5	Maxence Parrot (CAN)	84.33	19.66	84.33
6	Mons Røisland (NOR)	50.66	83.66	83.66
7	Brock Crouch (USA)	82.33	35.00	82.33
8	Kyle Mack (USA)	56.33	38.33	56.33
9	Sebastien Toutant (CAN)	33.00	38.66	38.66
10	Michael Ciccarelli (CAN)	25.66	29.33	29.33
11	Brandon Davis (USA)	20.66	28.00	28.00
12	Eric Beauchemin (USA)	16.33	26.66	26.66

=== Snowmobiling / Bike Cross ===
==== SnoCross Adaptive results ====
Rank	Name	Time
Gold medal	Mike Schultz (USA)	3:33.855
Silver medal	Garrett Goodwin (USA)	3:39.774
Bronze medal	Jeff Tweet (USA)	3:44.905
4	Doug Henry (USA)	3:48.823
5	Paul Thacker (USA)	3:54.491
6	Jim Wazny (USA)	3:55.147
7	E.J. Poplawski (USA)	3:36.755

==== SnoCross results ====
Rank	Name	Time
Gold medal	Petter Narsa (SWE)	9:53.911
Silver medal	Adam Renheim (SWE)	9:56.750
Bronze medal	Lincoln Lemieux (USA)	9:58.195
4	Tucker Hibbert (USA)	9:59.938
5	Tim Tremblay (CAN)	10:01.977
6	Corin Todd (USA)	10:09.539
7	Elias Ishoel (NOR)	16:39.999
8	Ryan Springer (USA)	16:39.999

==== BikeCross results ====
Rank	Name	Time
Gold medal	Brock Hoyer (CAN)	14:15.115
Silver medal	Colton Haaker (USA)	14:27.071
Bronze medal	Cody Matechuk (CAN)	14:38.794
4	Nolan Heppner (USA)	14:17.798
5	Jake Scott (USA)	14:24.313
6	Alfredo Gomez (ESP)	14:17.356
7	Reagan Sieg (CAN)	14:19.683
8	Seth Fischer (USA)	14:20.429
9	Harris Huizenga (USA)	14:20.867
10	Darrin Mees (USA)	14:22.877
11	Ronnie Faisst (USA)	14:30.990
12	Keith Curtis (USA)	14:37.966
13	Cody Thomsen (USA)	14:57.427
14	Axell Hodges (USA)	14:39.576
15	Jimmy Jarrett (USA)	16:39.999

==== Freestyle results ====
Rank	Name	Run 1	Run 2	Best Score
Gold medal	Joe Parsons (USA)	91.33	93.00	93.00
Silver medal	Colten Moore (USA)	92.00	78.66	92.00
Bronze medal	Levi LaVallee (USA)	86.66	90.00	90.00
4	Brett Turcotte (CAN)	88.66	63.00	88.66
5	Willie Elam (USA)	85.33	80.66	85.33
6	Heath Frisby (USA)	81.00	84.66	84.66
7	Cory Davis (USA)	84.33	82.33	84.33
8	Josh Penner (CAN)	82.00	78.00	82.00

==== Best Trick ====
Rank	Name	Run 1	Run 2	Best Score
Gold medal	Daniel Bodin (SWE)	71.33	85.33	85.33
Silver medal	Brett Turcotte (CAN)	76.33	83.33	83.33
Bronze medal	Joe Parsons (USA)	77.66	62.33	77.66
4	Josh Penner (CAN)	76.00	58.33	76.00
5	Cory Davis (USA)	74.33	74.00	74.33
6	Colten Moore (USA)	70.00		70.00
7	Willie Elam (USA)	63.33	69.66	69.66
8	Heath Frisby (USA)	67.33		67.33
