= Ragettli =

Ragettli is a surname. Notable people with the surname include:

- Andri Ragettli (born 1998), Swiss skier
- Nina Ragettli (born 1993), Swiss skier
