= Chai Hong =

Chai Hong may refer to:

- Chai Hong (skier)
- Chai Hong (actor)
