= Luca Schuler =

Luca Schuler may refer to:

- Luca Schuler (skier) (born 1998), Swiss freestyle skier
- Luca Schuler (footballer) (born 1999), German footballer
