= Park Hee-jin =

Park Hee-jin may refer to:

- Park Hee-jin (poet) (1931–2015), South Korean poet
- Park Hee-jin (freestyle skier) (born 1979), South Korean freestyle skier
- Park Hee-jin (actress) (born 1973), South Korean actress, model, comedian and singer
