= Spain at the 2014 Winter Olympics =

- IOC code: ESP
- NOC: Spanish Olympic Committee
- Website: www.coe.es (in Spanish)

in Sochi
- Competitors: 20 in 7 sports
- Flag bearers: Javier Fernández (opening); Laura Orgué (closing)
- Medals: Gold 0 Silver 0 Bronze 0 Total 0

Winter Olympics appearances (overview)
- 1936; 1948; 1952; 1956; 1960; 1964; 1968; 1972; 1976; 1980; 1984; 1988; 1992; 1994; 1998; 2002; 2006; 2010; 2014; 2018; 2022; 2026

Spain competed at the 2014 Winter Olympics in Sochi, Russia, from 7 to 23 February 2014. The 20 athlete team was officially announced on 21 January 2014.

== Alpine skiing ==
According to the quota allocation released on 30 December 2013, Spain had seven athletes in qualification position. The final team was announced on 21 January 2014.

Athlete	Event	Run 1		Run 2		Total	
Athlete	Event	Time	Rank	Time	Rank	Time	Rank
Pol Carreras	Men's giant slalom	DNF					
Pol Carreras	Men's slalom	DNF					
Paul de la Cuesta	Men's combined	1:56.22	26	55.84	23	2:52.06	22
Paul de la Cuesta	Men's downhill	—				2:09.46	28
Paul de la Cuesta	Men's giant slalom	1:27.13	45	1:26.13	33	2:53.26	36
Paul de la Cuesta	Men's super-G	—				DNF	
Alex Puente Tasias	Men's giant slalom	DNF					
Alex Puente Tasias	Men's slalom	53.73	48	1:05.72	32	1:59.45	32
Ferran Terra	Men's combined	1:57.23	34	56.31	26	2:53.54	25
Ferran Terra	Men's downhill	—				2:11.43	34
Ferran Terra	Men's giant slalom	DNF					
Ferran Terra	Men's super-G	—				DSQ	
Carolina Ruiz Castillo	Women's downhill	—				DNF	
Carolina Ruiz Castillo	Women's super-G	—				DNF	

== Biathlon ==
Spain qualified 1 men and 1 women.

Athlete	Event	Time	Misses	Rank
Victor Lobo	Men's sprint	28:53.3	4 (4+0)	84
Victor Lobo	Men's individual	57:22.8	3 (0+2+0+1)	72
Victoria Padial	Women's sprint	23:21.5	1 (0+1)	52
Victoria Padial	Women's pursuit	34:30.3	2 (1+0+0+1)	46
Victoria Padial	Women's individual	50:48.5	3 (1+0+1+1)	54

== Cross-country skiing ==
According to the quota allocation released on 30 December 2013, Spain had three athletes in qualification position. The final team was announced on 21 January 2014.

Distance

Athlete	Event	Classical		Freestyle		Final		
Athlete	Event	Time	Rank	Time	Rank	Time	Deficit	Rank
Javier Gutiérrez	Men's 15 km classical	—				43:43.9	+5:14.2	63
Javier Gutiérrez	Men's 30 km skiathlon	39:30.4	53	36:30.6	60	1:16:01.0	+7:45.6	58
Javier Gutiérrez	Men's 50 km freestyle	—				1:53:02.5	+6:07.3	47
Imanol Rojo	Men's 15 km classical	—				42:45.4	+4:15.7	50
Imanol Rojo	Men's 30 km skiathlon	39:05.5	50	34:35.4	47	1:13:40.5	+5:25.0	50
Imanol Rojo	Men's 50 km freestyle	—				1:49:21.9	+2:26.7	33
Laura Orgué	Women's 10 km classical	—				30:48.0	+2:30.2	26
Laura Orgué	Women's 15 km skiathlon	20:41.7	28	20:40.8	20	40:46.5	+2:12.9	25
Laura Orgué	Women's 30 km freestyle	—				1:12:37.3	+1:32.1	10

Sprint

Athlete	Event	Qualification		Quarterfinal		Semifinal		Final	
Athlete	Event	Time	Rank	Time	Rank	Time	Rank	Time	Rank
Imanol Rojo	Men's sprint	3:48.44	60	Did not advance					

== Figure skating ==
Spain achieved the following quota places: The team consists of the 2013 World Figure Skating Championships bronze medalist Javier Fernández among others.

Athlete	Event	SP		FS		Total	
Athlete	Event	Points	Rank	Points	Rank	Points	Rank
Javier Fernández	Men's singles	86.98	3 Q	166.94	5	253.92	4
Javier Raya	Men's singles	59.76	25	Did not advance			
Sara Hurtado / Adrià Díaz	Ice dancing	58.58	12 Q	88.39	13	146.97	13

== Freestyle skiing ==
According to the quota allocation released on 30 December 2013, Spain had one athlete in qualification position. The final team was announced on 21 January 2014.

Athlete	Event	Qualification				Final			
Athlete	Event	Run 1	Run 2	Best	Rank	Run 1	Run 2	Best	Rank
Katia Griffiths	Women's halfpipe	54.40	56.60	56.60	16	Did not advance			

== Skeleton ==
Spain had one athlete in qualification positions.

Athlete	Event	Run 1		Run 2		Run 3		Run 4		Total	
Athlete	Event	Time	Rank	Time	Rank	Time	Rank	Time	Rank	Time	Rank
Ander Mirambell	Men's	58.58	26	58.72	26	58.80	26	Did not advance		2:56.10	26

== Snowboarding ==
According to the quota allocation released on 30 December 2013, Spain had four athlete in qualification position. The final team was announced on 21 January 2014.

Halfpipe

Athlete	Event	Qualification				Semifinal				Final			
Athlete	Event	Run 1	Run 2	Best	Rank	Run 1	Run 2	Best	Rank	Run 1	Run 2	Best	Rank
Queralt Castellet	Women's halfpipe	93.25	52.00	93.25	2 QF	BYE				61.75	55.25	61.75	11

Qualification Legend: QF – Qualify directly to final; QS – Qualify to semifinal

Snowboard cross

Athlete	Event	Seeding		Round of 16	Quarterfinal	Semifinal	Final	
Athlete	Event	Time	Rank	Position	Position	Position	Position	Rank
Lucas Eguibar	Men's snowboard cross	CAN		1 Q	1 Q	DSQ FB	1	7
Regino Hernández	Men's snowboard cross	CAN		2 Q	DNF	Did not advance		=21
Laro Herrero	Men's snowboard cross	CAN		5	did not advance			=33

Qualification legend: FA – Qualify to medal round; FB – Qualify to consolation round
