= Manami Mitsuboshi =

Japanese freestyle skier (born 1984)

Personal information
- Born: January 16, 1984 (age 42) Yokohama, Japan

Sport
- Sport: Skiing

World Cup career
- Indiv. podiums: 1

Manami Mitsuboshi (三星 マナミ) (born January 16, 1984, in Yokohama) is a Japanese freestyle skier, specializing in halfpipe.

Mitsuboshi competed at the 2014 Winter Olympics for Japan. She placed 23rd in the qualifying round in the halfpipe, failing to advance.

As of April 2014, her best showing at the World Championships is 4th, in the 2013 halfpipe.

Mitsuboshi made her World Cup debut in March 2006. As of April 2014, she has one World Cup podium finish, a silver medal at Cardrona in 2012–13. Her best World Cup overall finish in halfpipe is 6th, in the 2010–11.

== World Cup podiums ==
Date	Location	Rank	Event
22 August 2012	Cardrona	2nd place, silver medalist(s)	Halfpipe
