= Amy Sheehan =

Australian freestyle skier

Personal information
- Born: 26 October 1986 (age 39)

Sport
- Country: Australia
- Sport: Freestyle skiing

Amy Sheehan (born 26 October 1986) is an Australian freestyle skier. She competed at the FIS Freestyle World Ski Championships 2013 in Voss. In 2014, she competed at the Winter X Games XVIII in Aspen, and the 2014 Winter Olympics in Sochi, in women's halfpipe.
