= Yurie Watabe =

Japanese freestyle skier (born 1989)

Personal information
- Born: 12 January 1989 (age 37)
- Height: 1.58 m (5 ft 2 in)

Sport
- Country: Japan
- Sport: Freestyle skiing
- Event: Halfpipe

Yurie Watabe (渡部 由梨恵, Watabe Yurie; born 12 January 1989) is a Japanese freestyle skier. She competed in the 2018 Winter Olympics in the women's halfpipe. Her husband is multiple Olympic medalist Japanese Nordic combined athlete, Akito Watabe.
