= Natalya Makagonova =

Russian freestyle skier

Personal information
- Born: 15 February 1992 (age 34) Sochi, Russia

Sport
- Sport: Skiing

Natalya Makagonova (born 15 February 1992 in Sochi) is a Russian freestyle skier, specializing in halfpipe.

Makagonova competed at the 2014 Winter Olympics for Russia. She placed 20th in the qualifying round in the halfpipe, failing to advance.

As of September 2015, her best showing at the World Championships is 21st, in the 2013 halfpipe.

Makagonova made her World Cup debut in February 2013. As of September 2015, her best World Cup finish is 18th, in a pair of events. Her best World Cup overall finish in halfpipe is 31st, in 2012–13.
