= Wu Meng =

Chinese freestyle skier

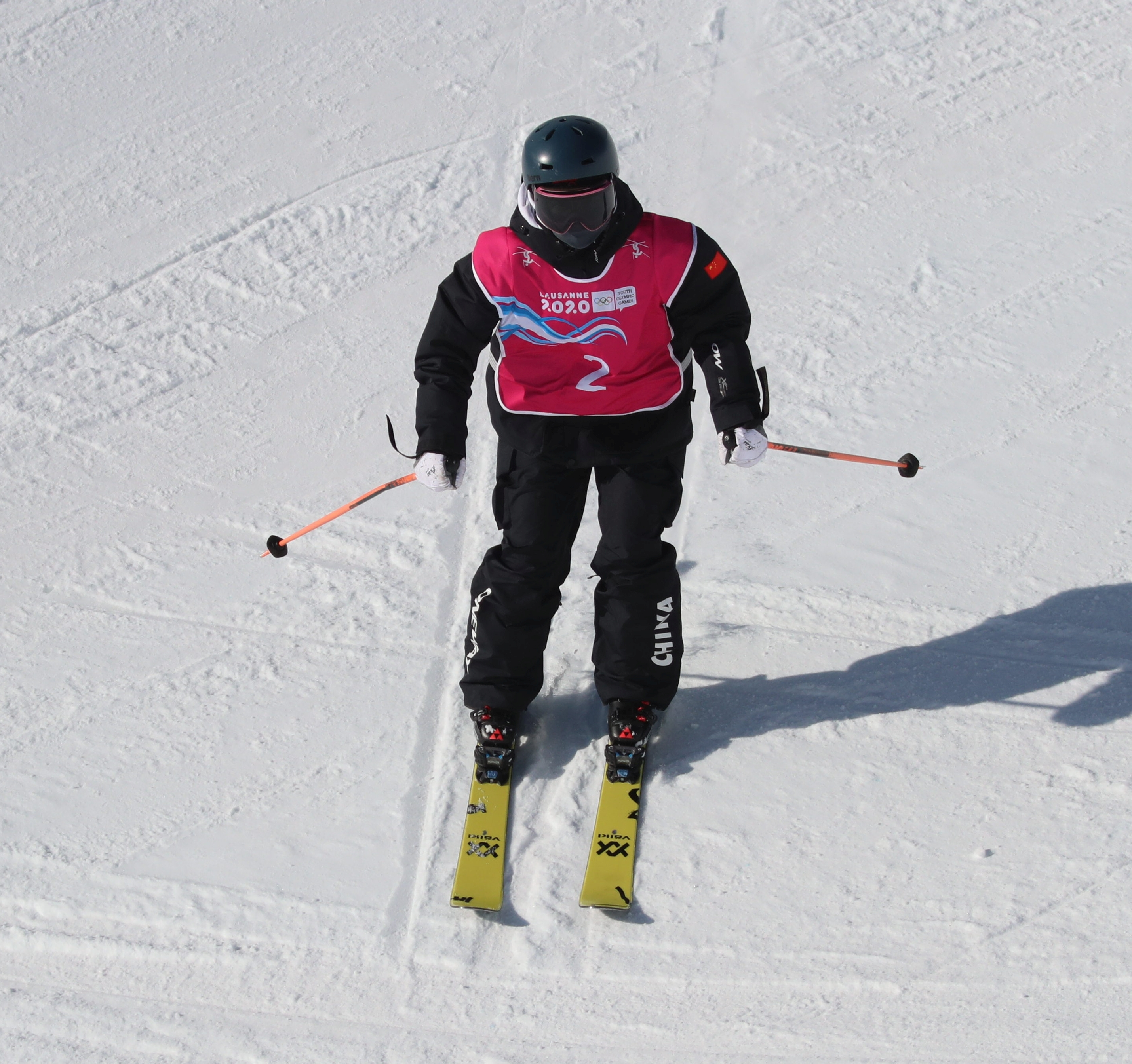
- Wu in 2020

Personal information
- Nationality: China
- Born: 2 October 2002 (age 23) Jilin, China
- Height: 1.60 m (5 ft 3 in)
- Weight: 53 kg (117 lb)

Sport
- Country: China
- Sport: Freestyle skiing
- Event: Halfpipe

Wu Meng
- Simplified Chinese: 吴梦
- Traditional Chinese: 吳夢
Transcriptions
Standard Mandarin
- Hanyu Pinyin: Wú Mèng
- Bopomofo: ㄨˊ ㄇㄥˋ
- Gwoyeu Romatzyh: Wu Menq
- Wade–Giles: Wu^{2} Meng^{4}
- Tongyong Pinyin: Wú Mèng
- Yale Romanization: Wú Mèng
- MPS2: Wú Mèng
- IPA: [ǔ mə̂ŋ]

Wu Meng (Chinese: 吴梦; pinyin: Wú Mèng; Mandarin pronunciation: [ǔ mə̂ŋ]; born 2 October 2002) is a Chinese freestyle skier. She competed in the 2018 Winter Olympics in the women's halfpipe. She was the youngest competitor in the 2018 Winter Olympics. She competed at the 2022 Winter Olympics.
