= Marie Martinod =

French freestyle skier (born 1984)

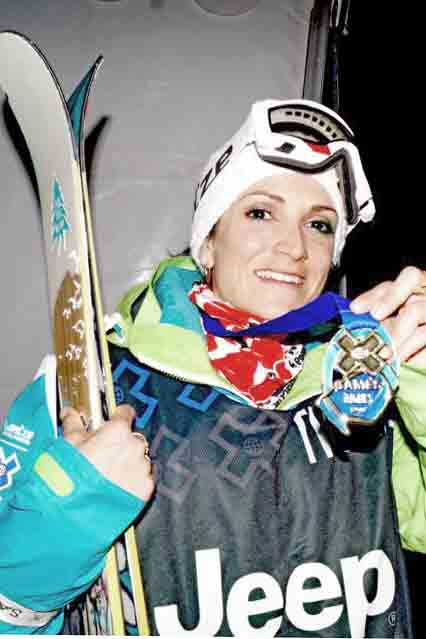
- Martinod in 2013

Personal information
- Born: 20 July 1984 (age 41) Bourg-Saint-Maurice, France

Sport
- Country: France
- Sport: Freestyle skiing
Medal record
Women's freestyle skiing
Representing France
Olympic Games
| Silver medal – second place | 2014 Sochi | Halfpipe |
| Silver medal – second place | 2018 Pyeongchang | Halfpipe |
Winter X Games
| Gold medal – first place | 2017 Aspen | SuperPipe |
| Bronze medal – third place | 2006 Aspen | SuperPipe |
| Bronze medal – third place | 2014 Aspen | SuperPipe |

Marie Martinod (born 20 July 1984) is a French freestyle skier. She won two silver medals in the halfpipe at the 2014 and 2018 Winter Olympics. She also won three medals in the superpipe event at the Winter X Games: one gold in 2017 and two bronze in 2006 and 2014.

A 51-minute movie, Memories of my People (Au nom des miens), tells her story.
