= Park Hee-jin (freestyle skier) =

South Korean freestyle skier

Personal information
- Born: April 12, 1979 (age 47) Gwangju, South Korea

Sport
- Sport: Skiing

Park Hee-jin (born April 12, 1979 in Gwangju) is a South Korean freestyle skier, specializing in halfpipe.

Park competed at the 2014 Winter Olympics for South Korea. She placed 21st in the qualifying round in the halfpipe, failing to advance.

Park made her World Cup debut in March 2013. As of April 2014, her best World Cup finish is 19th, at Sierra Nevada in 2012–13. Her best World Cup overall finish in halfpipe is 36th, in 2013–14.
