= Virginie Faivre =

Swiss freestyle skier (born 1982)

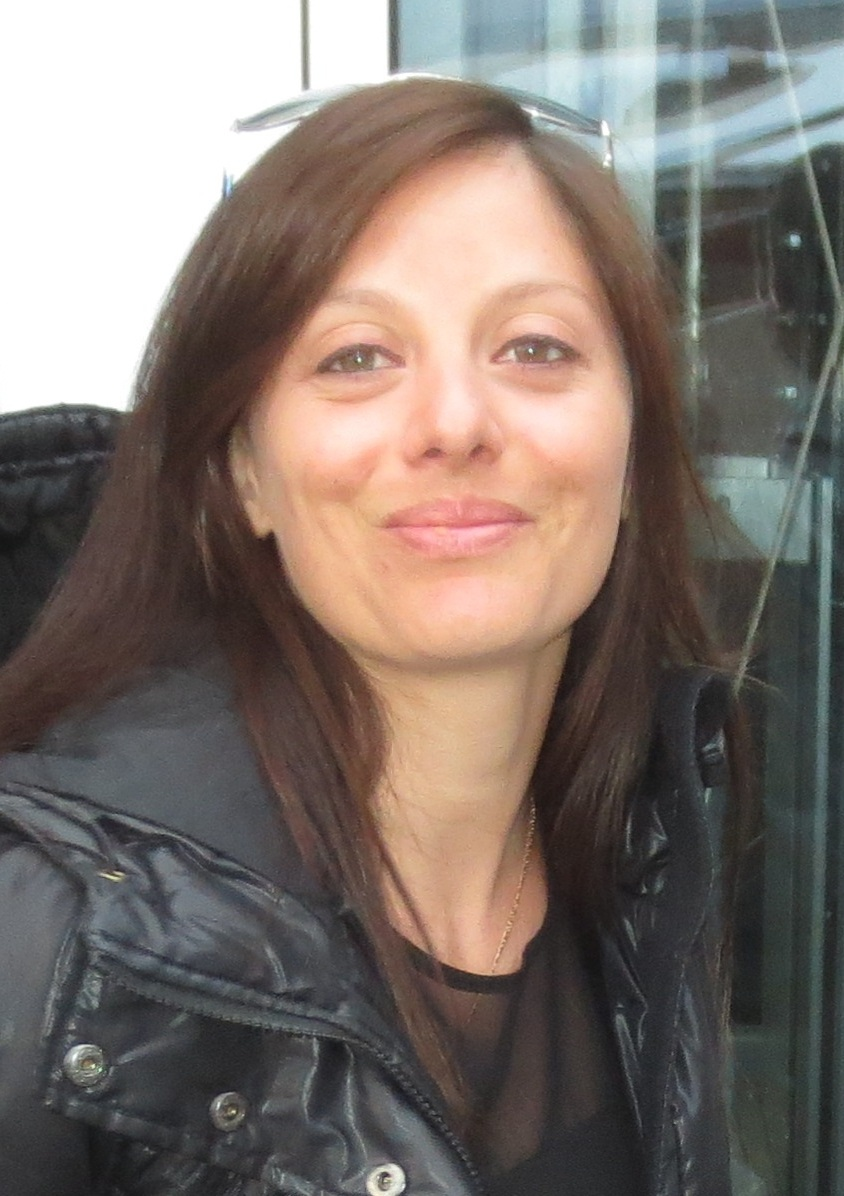

Personal information
- Born: 6 September 1982 (age 44)

Sport
- Country: Switzerland
Medal record
Women's Freestyle skiing
Representing Switzerland
World Championships
Gold medal – first place	2009 Inawashiro	Halfpipe
Gold medal – first place	2013 Voss	Halfpipe
Gold medal – first place	2015 Kreischberg	Halfpipe

Virginie Faivre (born 6 September 1982) is a Swiss freestyle skier. She was a three-time FIS World Champion in the halfpipe with her golds from, 2009 FIS Freestyle World Ski Championships, 2013 FIS Freestyle World Ski Championships and 2015 FIS Freestyle World Ski Championships.

She was the President of the organizing committee for the 2020 Winter Youth Olympics in Lausanne.

== Biography ==
She was the world half-pipe champion in 2009 at the World Championships and won the crystal globe at the end of the 2009 World Cup events. In 2013, she also succeeded in the World Cup-World Championship double, winning ahead of Anaïs Caradeux and Japanese Ayana Onozuka in Oslo. In total, she won two World Cup victories and climbed twelve podiums, the first of which was achieved during her first race in Saas-Fee. In 2014, she finished fourth at the Sochi Olympics in the half-pipe event. She won a third world championship title in 2015.

Victim of a new concussion in the printemps 2016she announced in December of the same year her decision to end her career.

She remains in the sports world, working on the organizing committee of the 2020 Youth Olympic Games, scheduled in Lausannethen by assuming the presidency.
