= Emma Lonsdale =

British freestyle skier

Personal information
- Nickname: Em
- Nationality: British
- Born: 24 April 1984 (age 41) Langcliffe, North Yorkshire, England
- Education: Settle High School
- Height: 1.75 m (5 ft 9 in)
- Weight: 69 kg (152 lb)

Sport
- Country: Great Britain
- Sport: Freestyle skiing
- Event: Halfpipe
- Club: GB Freeski team
- Coached by: Pat Sharples; Jamie Matthew
- Updated on 19 February 2014

Emma Lonsdale (born 24 April 1984) is a freestyle skier who competes in the halfpipe. Her Olympics debut was at the 2014 Winter Olympics in Sochi, competing for Team GB.

== Early life and education ==
Emma Lonsdale was born on 24 April 1984 in Langcliffe, Settle, North Yorkshire, England. Lonsdale began skiing at the age of 2, and soon became amongst the members of the Kendal Snowsports club. Her secondary school was Settle High School. She (in addition to the majority of the GB skiing team) learned how to ski on Snowflex, which has led to the team being called the "fridge kids".

== Skiing career ==
Lonsdale competed in alpine skiing for 16 years. However, she switched sports to freestyle skiing, where she trialled several disciplines: mogul, aerial, and skiercross. She eventually decided to participate in halfpipe skiing. At the 2008 X Games, Lonsdale finished in ninth place in halfpipe, and at the FIS Alpine World Ski Championships 2011 she finished in 11th place. She has won the halfpipe at the British Championships every year from 2003 to 2011.

She has also worked as a lifeguard.

=== Olympics ===
Lonsdale's debut in the Olympics was the 2014 Winter Games in Sochi, where she competed at the halfpipe for Team GB. She was confirmed as in the squad in late January. Her first action is in the qualifying round on 20 February 2014. Her aim is to win a medal. At the Olympics, she was due to compete with Rowan Cheshire, James Machon and Murray Buchan, but Cheshire was forced to withdraw due to an accident in training at the Rosa Khutor Extreme Park, leaving Lonsdale as Britain's only competitor in the women's halfpipe. Lonsdale is due to compete using Whitedot skis.

== Family ==
Lonsdale's brother Ben also skis, with the Royal Air Force.
