= Chai Hong (skier) =

Chinese freestyle skier (born 1999)

Personal information
- Born: 9 August 1999 (age 26)
- Height: 1.55 m (5 ft 1 in)

Sport
- Country: China
- Sport: Freestyle skiing
- Event: Halfpipe

Chai Hong (Chinese: 柴洪; pinyin: Chái Hóng; Mandarin pronunciation: [ʈʂʰǎɪ xʊ̌ŋ]; born 9 August 1999) is a Chinese freestyle skier. She competed in the 2018 Winter Olympics in the women's halfpipe.
