= Katia Griffiths =

Spanish freestyle skier

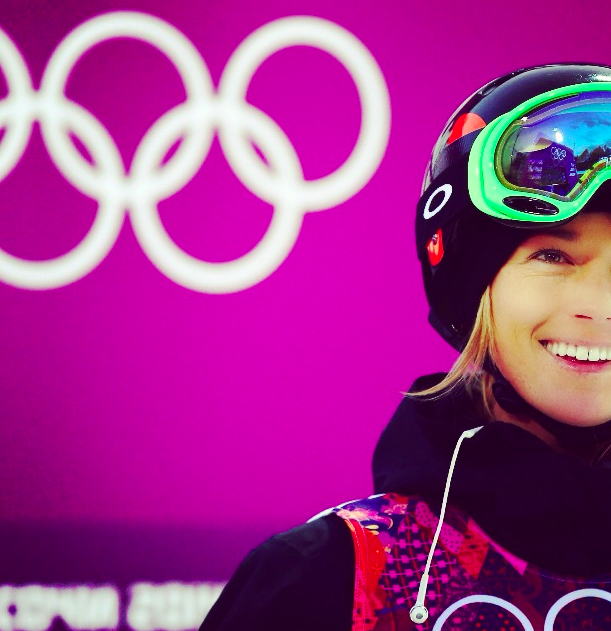
Katia Griffiths Sochi 2014

Katia Griffiths (born August 4, 1982) is a Spanish freestyle skier who competed in ski halfpipe. Her mother is from Spain and her father is from the United Kingdom. She was born in London.

Katia participated in the Olympic debut of the ski halfpipe in Sochi 2014 where she finished 16th in the qualification.

Her best results in World Cup is the 5th place in La Plagne in 2009 and also 5th place in Kreischberg in 2011.

== Olympic results ==
Season	Date	Location	Discipline	Place
2014	20 Feb 2014	(Russia) Sochi, Rusia	Women's halfpipe	16th
