= Maddie Bowman =

American freestyle skier (born 1994)

Personal information
- Born: Maddison Michelle Bowman; January 10, 1994 (age 32) South Lake Tahoe, California, U.S.
- Height: 5 ft 1 in (155 cm)
Medal record
Women's freestyle skiing
Representing the United States
Olympic Games
Gold medal – first place	2014 Sochi	Halfpipe
Winter X Games
Gold medal – first place	2013 Aspen	SuperPipe
Gold medal – first place	2014 Aspen	SuperPipe
Gold medal – first place	2015 Aspen	SuperPipe
Gold medal – first place	2016 Aspen	SuperPipe
Gold medal – first place	2018 Aspen	SuperPipe
Silver medal – second place	2012 Aspen	SuperPipe
Bronze medal – third place	2017 Aspen	SuperPipe

Maddison Michelle "Maddie" Bowman (born January 10, 1994) is an American former freestyle skier. She won a silver medal in the superpipe at Winter X Games XVI in 2012.

Bowman won gold at Winter X Games XVII in 2013, 2014, 2015, 2016 & 2018, and a gold medal at the 2014 Winter Olympics in the ski halfpipe. At the 2018 Winter Olympics, she finished in 11th place.
