= Mirjam Jäger =

Swiss freestyle skier (born 1982)

Mirjam Jaeger
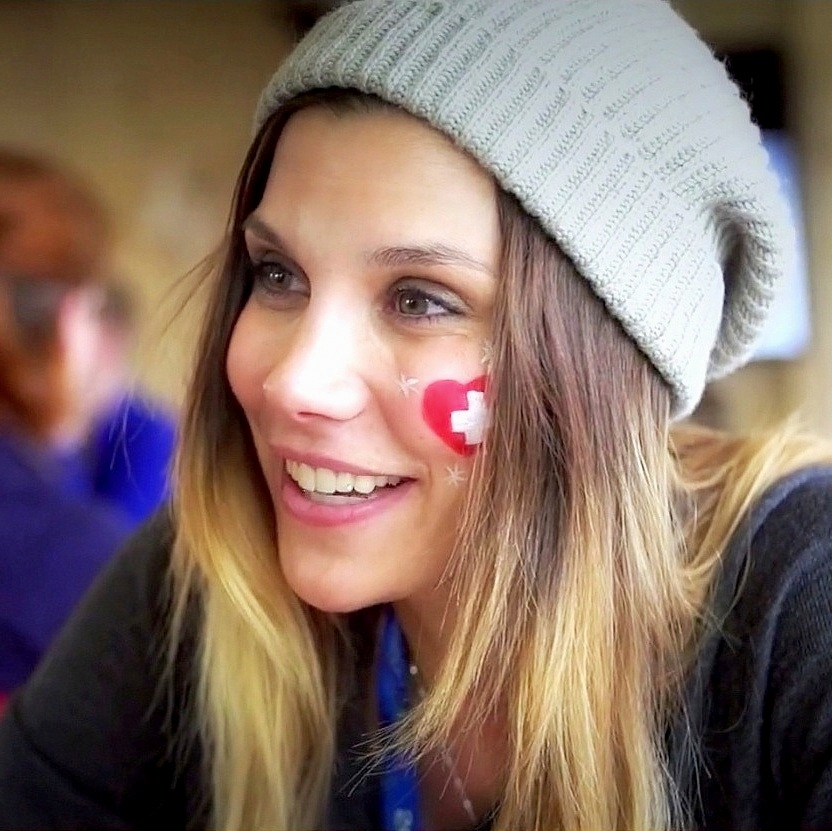
- Mirjam at Sochi 2014

Personal information
- Native name: Mirjam Jäger
- Nickname: Mimi
- Nationality: Swiss
- Born: 9 November 1982 (age 43) Zürich, Switzerland
- Years active: 1998 – 2015
- Height: 175 cm (5 ft 9 in)
- Weight: 64 kg (141 lb)
- Children: 2
- Website: MirjamJaeger.com
Medal record
Women's freestyle skiing
Representing Switzerland
World Championships
Bronze medal – third place	2015 Kreischberg	Halfpipe
Winter X Games
Silver medal – second place	2008 Aspen	Halfpipe
World Cup
Silver medal – second place	2006 Les Contamines	Halfpipe
Bronze medal – third place	2008 Les Contamines	Halfpipe
Bronze medal – third place	2013 Cardrona	Halfpipe

Mirjam Jaeger (German: Mirjam Jäger, pronounced [ˈjɛːɡɐ]; (Note: In other languages than German that do not have the letter "ä" as part of the regular alphabet or in limited character sets such as US-ASCII, ä is frequently replaced with the two-letter combination "ae". For this reason, her last name, "Jäger", is also written as "Jaeger" by replacing the umlaut on the A with the letters AE.) born 9 November 1982 in Zürich) is a Swiss former freestyle skier. Now she concentrates on her modeling and sports broadcaster career.

== Background and early years ==
Mirjam Jaeger was born in Zurich, Switzerland, surrounded by Alps, where she learned to ski at an early age. Although she grew up skiing, she learned how to snowboard when she was still a kid, and snowboarding quickly became her new passion.

In 1991, she tried snowboarding and started doing regional halfpipe competitions at the age of 16, finding the first sponsors to be able to compete. She competed in one Halfpipe World Cup and a few Europa Cups in Snowboarding, and while balancing her academic studies, she was able to ski and snowboard. It wasn't until 2004 that she put aside her snowboard to focus on freeskiing only.

== Competitions ==
She gave her World Cup debut in skiing Halfpipe in 2004 in Les Contamines, France, where she finished in 6th place. Between 2006 and 2013 she's had 3 podium finishes in World Cups. Two 2nd places in Les Contamines, France in 2006 and 2008 and a 3rd place in Cardrona, New Zealand in 2013. Her best finishes in the overall Halfpipe World Cup Ranking are a 2nd place in the 2005/2006 season, a 5th place in the 2012/2013 season and the 4th place in the 2013/2014 season.

She also has two other important silver medals: one from the Winter X Games XII in Aspen, CO in 2008, and the other one from the Winter Dew Tour in Breckenridge, CO in 2011.

Half-pipe skiing made its Olympic debut at the 2014 Winter Olympics in Sochi, Russia, where she reached the final and finished in eighth place.

In 2015, January, after getting injured in World Champs 2009, 2011 and 2013, she won the Bronze Medal at the FIS Feestyle Ski and Snowboarding World Championships in Kreischberg. In February she participated at the "Russian Freestyle Games", competing in both slopestyle and halfpipe, reaching 5th place in slopestyle and winning the halfpipe competition.

Mirjam Jäger retired from competition 24 March 2015.

=== See also ===
Freestyle skiing at the 2014 Winter Olympics

=== Appearances ===
During the closing ceremony of the Olympic Games in Sochi , in the all countries parade of athletes, she was the first athlete to be framed by the cameras (min 3:18).

== Results ==
=== Winter Olympics ===
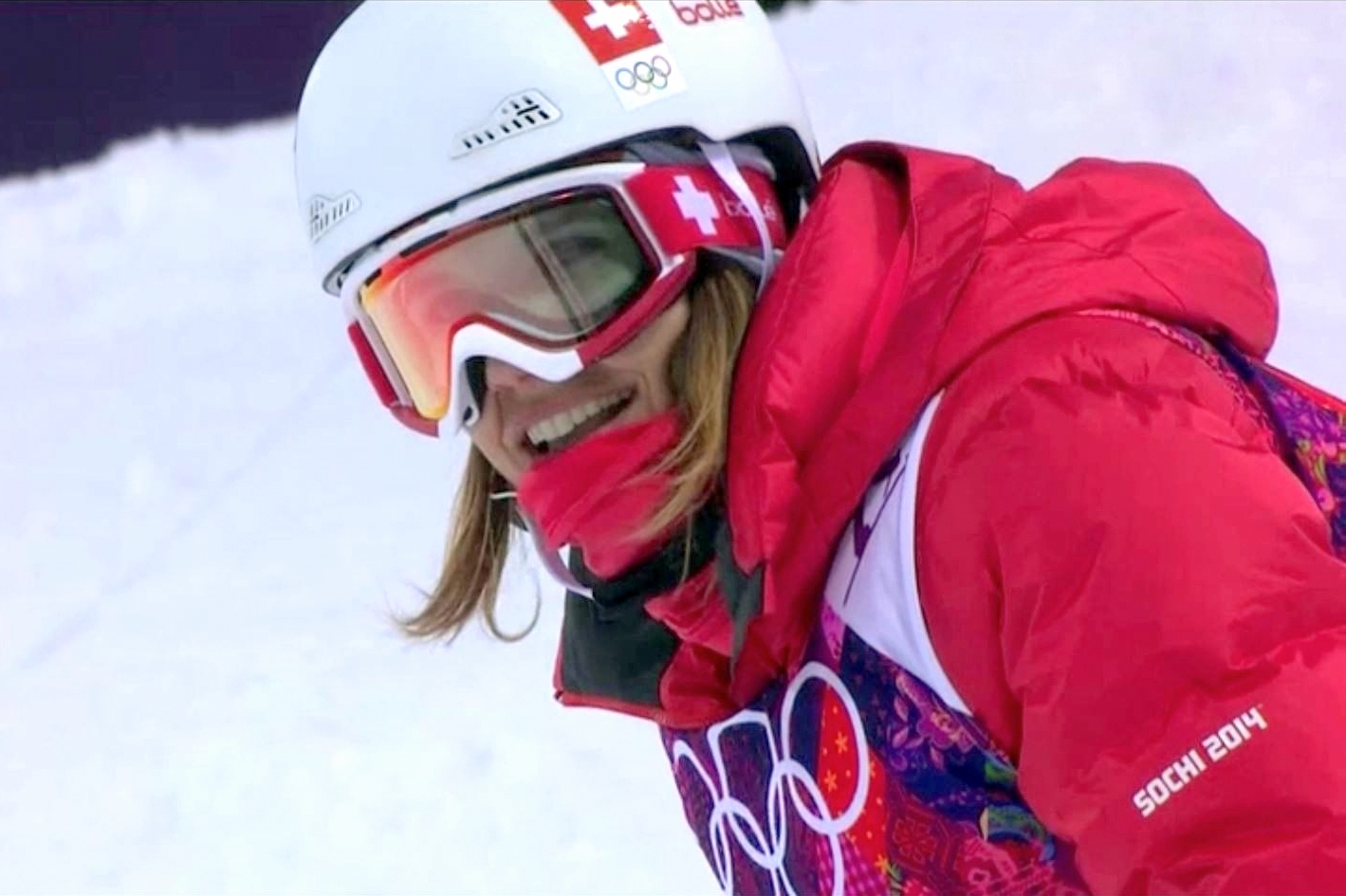
Mirjam Jaeger during 'first run' at 2014 Winter Olympics in Sochi

Date	Edition	Discipline	Place
20 February 2014	Sochi, Russia	Halfpipe	8th

=== World Championships ===
Year	Edition	Discipline	Place
2009	Inawashiro, Japan	Halfpipe	11th
2011	Deer Valley, United States	Halfpipe	7th
2013	Voss-Myrkdalen, Norway	Halfpipe	8th
2015	Kreischberg, Austria	Halfpipe	(bronze) Bronze Medal

=== Winter X Games ===
(silver) Silver Medal at Winter X Games 2008 in Aspen, United States.

=== Winter Dew Tour ===
(silver) Silver Medal at Winter Dew Tour 2011 in Breckenridge, United States.

=== Russian Freestyle Games ===
(gold) Gold Medal at Russian Freestyle Games 2015 in Miass, Russia, discipline Halfpipe.

== Model ==
In her modeling career, after being subject to various advertising campaigns for sports equipments such as skis, boots, glasses, overalls etcetera, Mirjam was the cover girl of the German language edition of Maxim for Germany, Austria, and Switzerland in February 2014, and was also featured in the February 2014 issue of Maxim Thailand as well as the March 2014 issue of Maxim Australia.

She has also finished in 3rd place in the Maxim Hot 100 Switzerland list in 2013, being the only athlete finishing within the Top 20.

== Television ==
In the summer of 2014, she participated as a contestant on the TV series "Stable Wars Del Mar" (season 2) in the team along with Nanci Dahl and Karen Headley. The TV series started to broadcast on Fox Sports San Diego on Monday, 10 November 2014.

In June 2015 Mirjam debuted as a sports broadcaster for Blick.ch. She presented talk shows and sports events. She also broadcast the election of the Olympic cities 2024 & 2028 for The Olympic Channel live from Lima, Peru in 2017 as well as the election of the Olympic city 2026 live from Lausanne, Switzerland in 2019.

She is also one of the two main characters in the Olympic Channels documentary “Running in North Korea” filmed in 2019.

== Personal life ==
Mirjam Jaeger has two kids and was engaged to Rafael Beutl, Model and Swiss Bachelor (TV show) of 2014, who is also the father. They announced their split in January 2022.
