= Nina Ragettli =

Swiss freestyle skier (born 1993)

Personal information
- Born: 6 March 1993 (age 33) Flims, Switzerland

Sport
- Sport: Skiing

Nina Ragettli (born 6 March 1993) is a Swiss freestyle skier, specializing in halfpipe.

Ragettli competed at the 2014 Winter Olympics for Switzerland. She placed 22nd in the qualifying round in the halfpipe, failing to advance.

As of September 2015, her best showing at the World Championships is 18th, in the 2013 halfpipe.

Ragettli made her World Cup debut in August 2012. As of September 2015, her best World Cup finish is 6th, at Cardrona in 2013–14. Her best World Cup overall finish in halfpipe is 14th, in 2012–13.
