= Janina Kuzma =

New Zealand freestyle skier

Personal information
- Nationality: New Zealand
- Born: 17 September 1985 (age 40)

Sport
- Sport: Freestyle skiing
- Event: Halfpipe

Janina Kuzma (born 17 September 1985) is a New Zealand freestyle skier. She competed at the FIS Freestyle World Ski Championships 2013 in Voss. She competed at the 2014 Winter Olympics in Sochi, placing 5th in the women's halfpipe. She is set to compete at the 2018 Winter Olympics in PyeongChang, in same event. She is seven-time New Zealand Big Mountain Champion, two-time Canadian Freeski Champion, two-time World Heli Challenge Champion and second overall in the world for half pipe 2015.
