= Luca Schuler (skier) =

Swiss freestyle skier

Personal information
- Born: 17 January 1998 (age 28) Schwyz, Switzerland

Sport
- Country: Switzerland
- Sport: Freestyle skiing
- Event: Slopestyle

Achievements and titles
- Olympic finals: 1 (2014)

Luca Schuler (born 17 January 1998) is a Swiss freestyle skier. He was born in Schwyz. He competed at the 2014 Winter Olympics in Sochi, in slopestyle.
