= Ayana Onozuka =

Japanese freestyle skier (born 1988)

Personal information
- Born: March 23, 1988 (age 38)
- Height: 158 cm (5 ft 2 in)
- Weight: 50 kg (110 lb)

Sport
- Country: Japan
- Position: forward
Medal record
Women's freestyle skiing
Representing Japan
Olympic Games
Bronze medal – third place	2014 Sochi	Halfpipe
World Championships
Bronze medal – third place	2013 Voss	halfpipe
Gold medal – first place	2017 Sierra Nevada	halfpipe
Winter X Games
Silver medal – second place	2015 Aspen	SuperPipe
Silver medal – second place	2016 Aspen	SuperPipe
Silver medal – second place	2017 Aspen	SuperPipe

Ayana Onozuka (小野塚彩那, Onozuka Ayana; born March 23, 1988) is a Japanese freestyle skier. She won a bronze medal at the 2014 Sochi Winter Olympics and the 2013 FIS Freestyle World Ski Championships.

== Major achievements ==
- 2012 FIS World Cup (Cardrona) - 3rd place
- 2013 FIS World Cup (Park City) - 2nd place
- Freestyle Skiing World Championships (Oslo) - 3rd place
- 2013 FIS World Cup (Sierra Nevada) - 3rd place
- 2014 FIS World Cup (Breckenridge) - 2nd place
- 2014 Sochi Olympics - 3rd place
- 2014 DEW TOUR - 3rd place
- 2015 DEW TOUR - 1st place
- 2014 FIS World Cup (Copper Mountain) - 3rd place
- Winter X-Games 2015 - 2nd place
- United St. Freeskiing Grand Prix Copper Mountain Grand Prix - 3rd place
- United St. Freeskiing Grand Prix Copper Mountain Grand Prix - 1st place
- SFR Freestyle Tour - 2nd place
- 2015 FIS World Cup (Park City) - 1st place
- 2015 FIS World Cup (Tignes) - 2nd place
- The North Face Freeski New Zealand Open - 2nd place
- 2015 FIS World Cup (NZ) WINTER GAMES NZ 3rd place
- Winter X-Games 2016 - 2nd place
- 2016 FIS World Cup (Park City) - 2nd place
- X-Games Oslo - 3rd place
- Winter X-Games 2017 - 2nd place
- United St. Freeskiing Grand Prix Copper Mountain Grand Prix - 3rd place
- Snowboard & Freestyle Skiing World Championships (Sierra Nevada) - 1st place
