= Brita Sigourney =

American freestyle skier (born 1990)

Personal information
- Born: January 17, 1990 (age 36) Monterey, California, U.S.
- Height: 5 ft 6 in (168 cm)
- Weight: 123 lb (56 kg)

Sport
- Country: United States
- Sport: Freestyle skiing
- Event: Halfpipe
Medal record
Women's freestyle skiing
Representing the United States
Winter Olympics
Bronze medal – third place	2018 Pyeongchang	Halfpipe
World Championships
Bronze medal – third place	2019 Utah	Halfpipe
Winter X Games
Silver medal – second place	2011 Aspen	SuperPipe
Silver medal – second place	2018 Aspen	SuperPipe
Bronze medal – third place	2012 Aspen	SuperPipe
Bronze medal – third place	2015 Aspen	SuperPipe

Brita Jean Sigourney (born January 17, 1990) is an American freestyle skier and three-time Olympian. A pioneer in women's freeskiing, she is an Olympic bronze medalist and a multiple-time X Games medalist. Following her retirement from professional competition in 2023, she transitioned into a career in interior design.

== Early life and education ==
Sigourney was born in Monterey, California, and grew up in Carmel Valley. She began skiing at the age of two during family trips to Alpine Meadows near Lake Tahoe. She attended All Saints Day School in Carmel and later Santa Catalina School in Monterey, where she was a standout multi-sport athlete. In addition to playing water polo, Sigourney was a competitive diver at Santa Catalina, a background that contributed to her aerial awareness and technical skill in the halfpipe.

She later attended the University of California, Davis, where she studied graphic design and played on the varsity water polo team before committing fully to her professional skiing career.

== Career ==
Sigourney made her professional debut in the early 2010s and quickly established herself as a dominant force in women’s halfpipe. Known for her high amplitude and technical precision, she became a pioneer for the sport's progression. At the 2012 Winter X Games, Sigourney made history as the first woman to land a 1080 in a full halfpipe competition run, a milestone that significantly elevated the technical standards of women's freeskiing.

=== Olympic Games ===
Sigourney is a three-time Olympian, representing the United States in every Winter Games since the debut of her discipline:

- 2014 Sochi: Finished 6th in the inaugural women's Olympic halfpipe event.
- 2018 Pyeongchang: Earned the Olympic bronze medal with a score of 91.60 on her final run.
- 2022 Beijing: In her final Olympic appearance, she qualified for the finals as the top-placed American and finished 10th overall.

=== FIS World Championships and World Cup circuit ===
A mainstay on the international circuit for over a decade, Sigourney was a 2010 Junior World Champion and went on to secure a bronze medal at the 2019 FIS World Championships in Park City, Utah. Her World Cup career includes 13 podium finishes and four victories, with notable wins at the 2011 and 2018 Copper Mountain and Mammoth Mountain Grand Prix events.

=== X Games ===
Beyond her historic 1080 in 2012, Sigourney was a prolific X Games competitor, holding the record for the most appearances by a female skier in the event’s history. She amassed five X Games medals (three silver and two bronze), including a silver in her 2011 debut and a final silver medal at X Games Aspen 2022.

Throughout her career, Sigourney became a symbol of athletic resilience. She consistently returned to the podium despite enduring nine surgeries for various injuries, including a significant tibia reconstruction in 2019, before retiring from professional competition in March 2023.

== Retirement and later career ==
On March 7, 2023, Sigourney officially announced her retirement from professional halfpipe skiing. Following her athletic career, she remained in Park City, Utah, where she has established herself as an interior designer. Drawing on her background in graphic design and her long-standing interest in aesthetics, she now works on residential design projects in the Park City area.
