= Angeli Vanlaanen =

American freestyle skier (born 1985)

Personal information
- Born: October 24, 1985 (age 40) Bellingham, Washington, U.S.
- Height: 5 ft 4 in (163 cm)
- Weight: 130 lb (59 kg)

Sport
- Country: United States
Medal record
New Zealand Winter Games
Silver medal – second place	2013 Cardrona	Halfpipe

Angeli Vanlaanen (or VanLaanen, born October 24, 1985) is an American freestyle skier. She competed at the 2014 Winter Olympics in Sochi, Russia.

In November 2009, she was diagnosed with chronic Lyme disease.
