= Annalisa Drew =

American freestyle skier

Personal information
- Born: May 28, 1993 (age 33) Andover, Massachusetts, U.S.
- Height: 5 ft 4 in (163 cm)
- Weight: 115 lb (52 kg)
Medal record
Women's freestyle skiing
Representing the United States
Winter X Games
| Bronze medal – third place | 2016 Aspen | SuperPipe |

Annalisa Drew (born May 28, 1993) is an American freestyle skier.

Drew competed with Team USA at the 2014 Winter Olympics in Sochi, Russia.
