= Anaïs Caradeux =

French freestyle skier

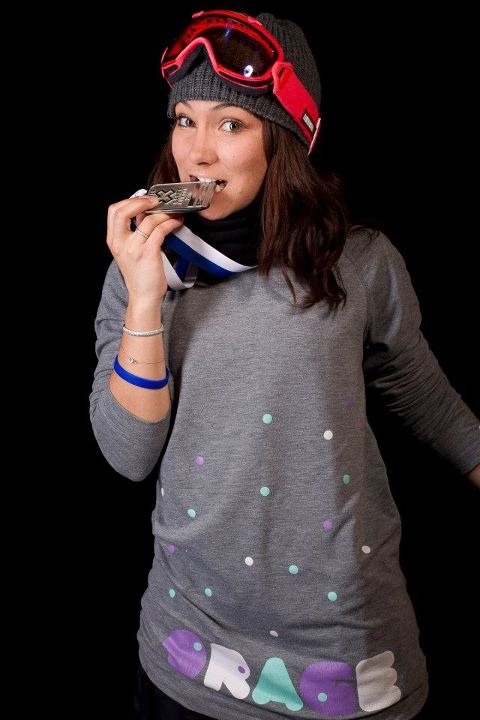

Personal information
- Born: June 30, 1990 (age 35) Aix-les-Bains, France

Sport
- Country: France
Medal record
Representing France
Women's Freestyle skiing
FIS Freestyle World Ski Championships
Silver medal – second place	2013 Voss	Halfpipe

Anaïs Caradeux (born 30 June 1990) is a French freestyle skier. She won a silver medal at the 2013 FIS Freestyle World Ski Championships.
