= FIS Freestyle World Ski Championships 2013 =

2013 edition of the FIS Freestyle World Ski Championships

The 2013 FIS Freestyle World Ski Championships were held at Voss, Norway from March 5–10, 2013. Voss was acclaimed as the host in May 2008 as no other bids were received. Skiers competed in six disciplines: Moguls, Dual Moguls, Ski Cross, Slopestyle, Half Pipe and Aerials. These were the first FIS Freestyle World Ski Championships held in Norway.

== Results ==
=== Men's events ===
Event	Gold		Silver		Bronze	
Moguls	Mikaël Kingsbury; Canada	27.59	Alexandre Bilodeau; Canada	26.95	Patrick Deneen; United States	25.90
Dual moguls	Alexandre Bilodeau; Canada		Mikaël Kingsbury; Canada		Patrick Deneen; United States	
Aerials	Qi Guangpu; China	138.00	Travis Gerrits; Canada	117.73	Jia Zongyang; China	99.09
Halfpipe	David Wise; United States	96.2	Torin Yater-Wallace; United States	95.6	Thomas Krief; France	94.2
Slopestyle	Tom Wallisch; United States	94.8	James Woods; United Kingdom	91.2	Nick Goepper; United States	89.2
Ski cross	Jean-Frédéric Chapuis; France		Bastien Midol; France		John Teller; United States	

=== Women's events ===
Event	Gold		Silver		Bronze	
Moguls	Hannah Kearney; United States	26.70	Miki Ito; Japan	24.92	Justine Dufour-Lapointe; Canada	23.48
Dual moguls	Chloé Dufour-Lapointe; Canada		Miki Ito; Japan		Hannah Kearney; United States	
Aerials	Xu Mengtao; China	98.53	Veronika Korsunova; Russia	75.26	Danielle Scott; Australia	74.1
Halfpipe	Virginie Faivre; Switzerland	83.8	Anais Caradeux; France	80.6	Ayana Onozuka; Japan	80.4
Slopestyle	Kaya Turski; Canada	89.6	Dara Howell; Canada	85.6	Grete Eliassen; United States	81.2
Ski cross	Fanny Smith; Switzerland		Marielle Thompson; Canada		Ophelie David; France	

== Medal table ==
Rank	Nation	Gold	Silver	Bronze	Total
1	Canada (CAN)	4	5	1	10
2	United States (USA)	3	1	6	10
3	China (CHN)	2	0	1	3
4	Switzerland (SUI)	2	0	0	2
5	France (FRA)	1	2	2	5
6	Japan (JPN)	0	2	1	3
7	Great Britain (GBR)	0	1	0	1
7	Russia (RUS)	0	1	0	1
9	Australia (AUS)	0	0	1	1
Totals (9 entries)		12	12	12	36
