= List of 2014 Winter Olympics medal winners =

The 2014 Winter Olympics, officially the XXII Olympic Winter Games, or the 22nd Winter Olympics, took place from 7 to 23 February 2014, in Sochi, Russia. 98 events in 15 winter sport disciplines were held, with gold, silver and bronze medals were awarded in each event. Russia originally won 33 medals; three were later stripped for doping violations.

== Alpine skiing ==
=== Men's events ===
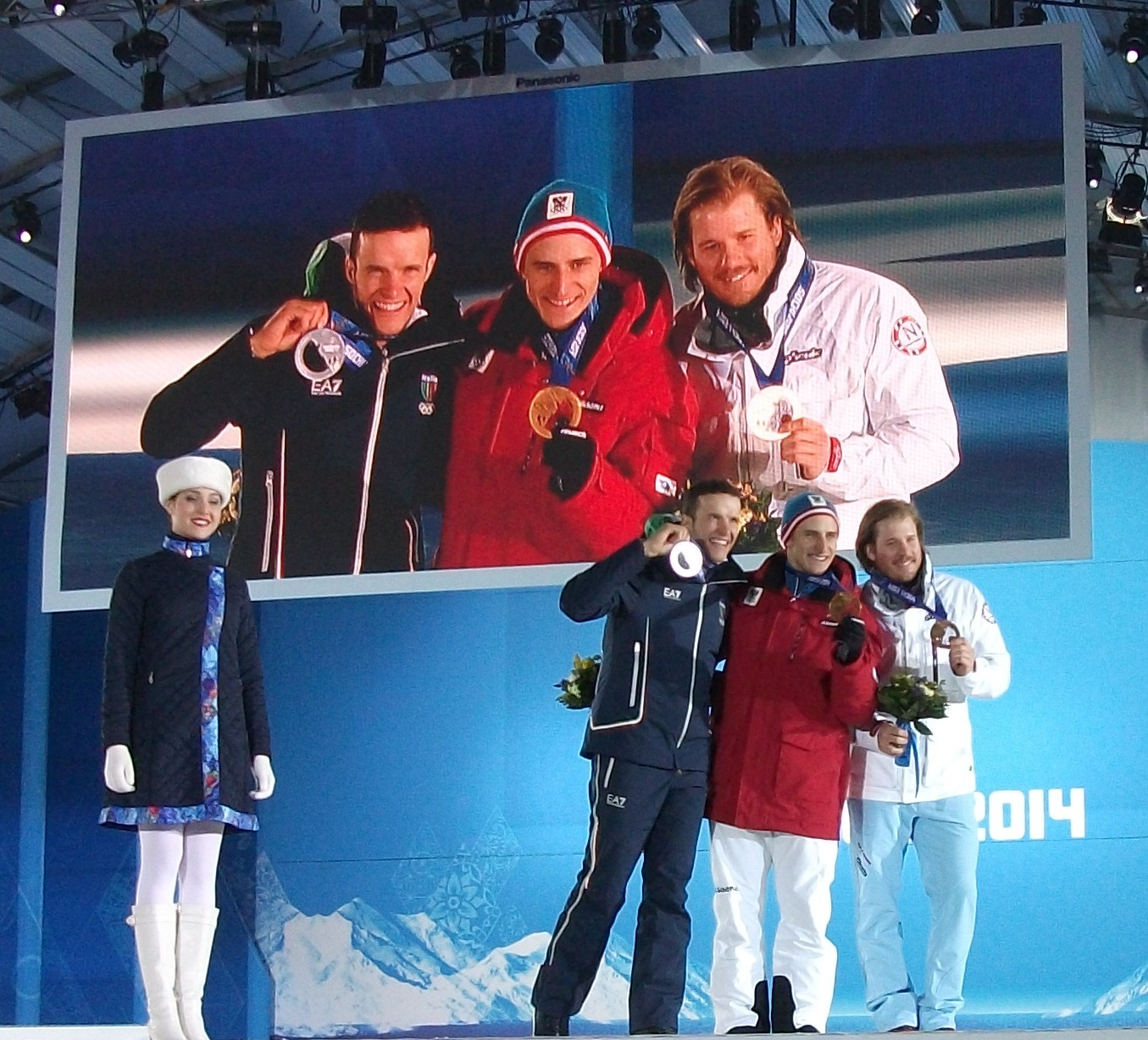
The medalists in men's downhill

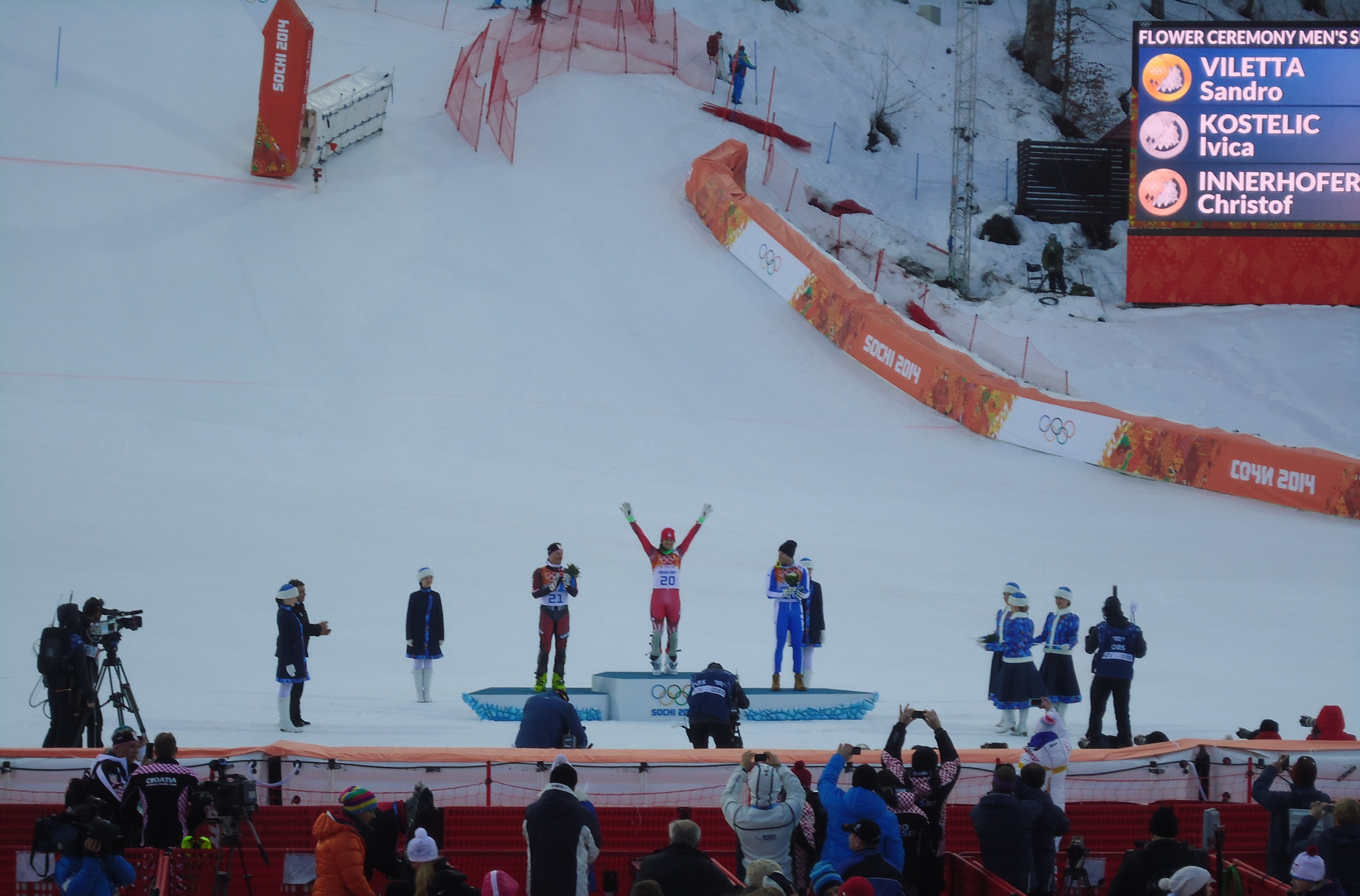
The medalists in men's super combined

Two bronze medals, one to Canada and one to United States, were awarded for a third-place tie in the men's super-G event.

Event	Gold	Silver	Bronze
Downhill	Matthias Mayer; Austria	Christof Innerhofer; Italy	Kjetil Jansrud; Norway
Super-G	Kjetil Jansrud; Norway	Andrew Weibrecht; United States	Jan Hudec; Canada
Super-G	Kjetil Jansrud; Norway	Andrew Weibrecht; United States	Bode Miller; United States
Giant slalom	Ted Ligety; United States	Steve Missillier; France	Alexis Pinturault; France
Slalom	Mario Matt; Austria	Marcel Hirscher; Austria	Henrik Kristoffersen; Norway
Combined	Sandro Viletta; Switzerland	Ivica Kostelić; Croatia	Christof Innerhofer; Italy

=== Women's events ===
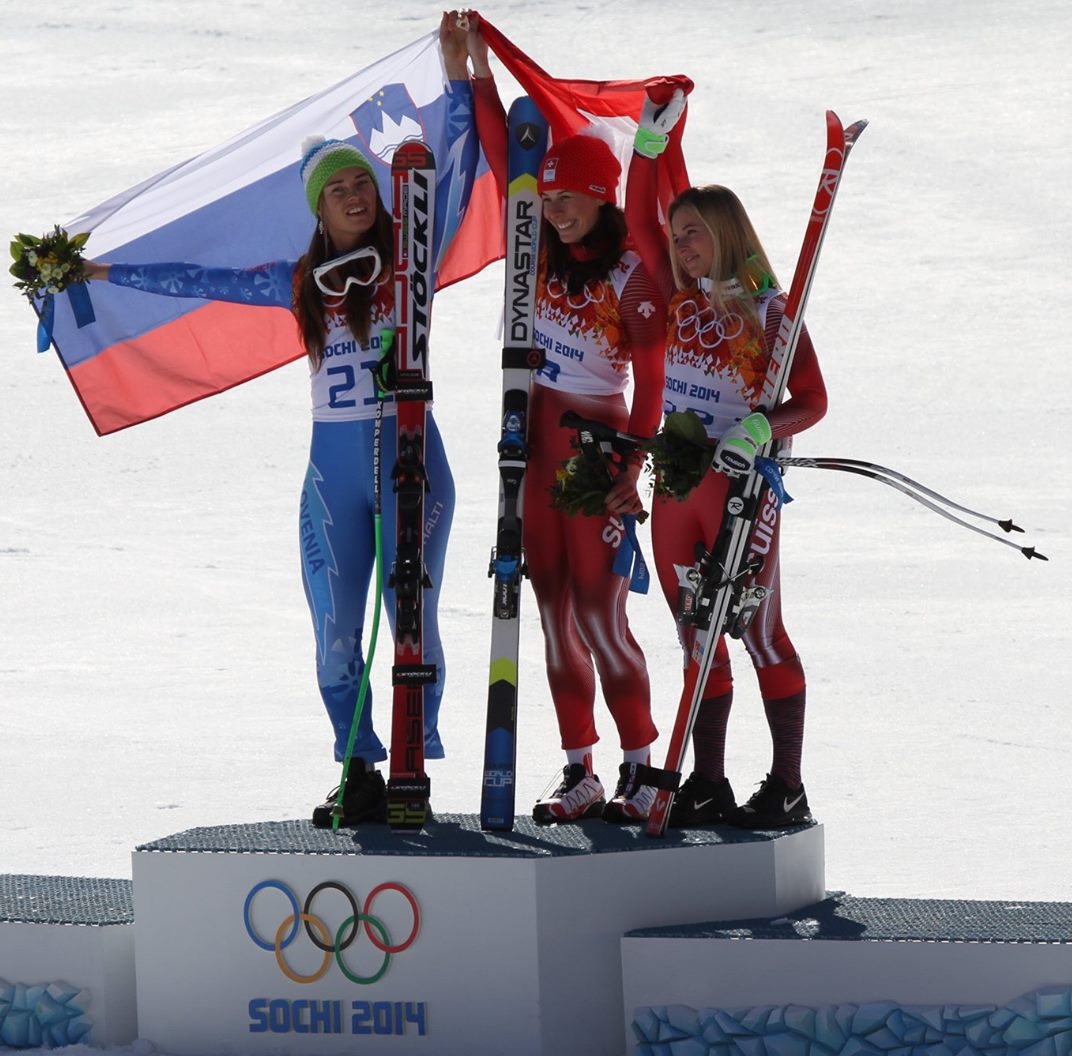
The medalists in women's downhill

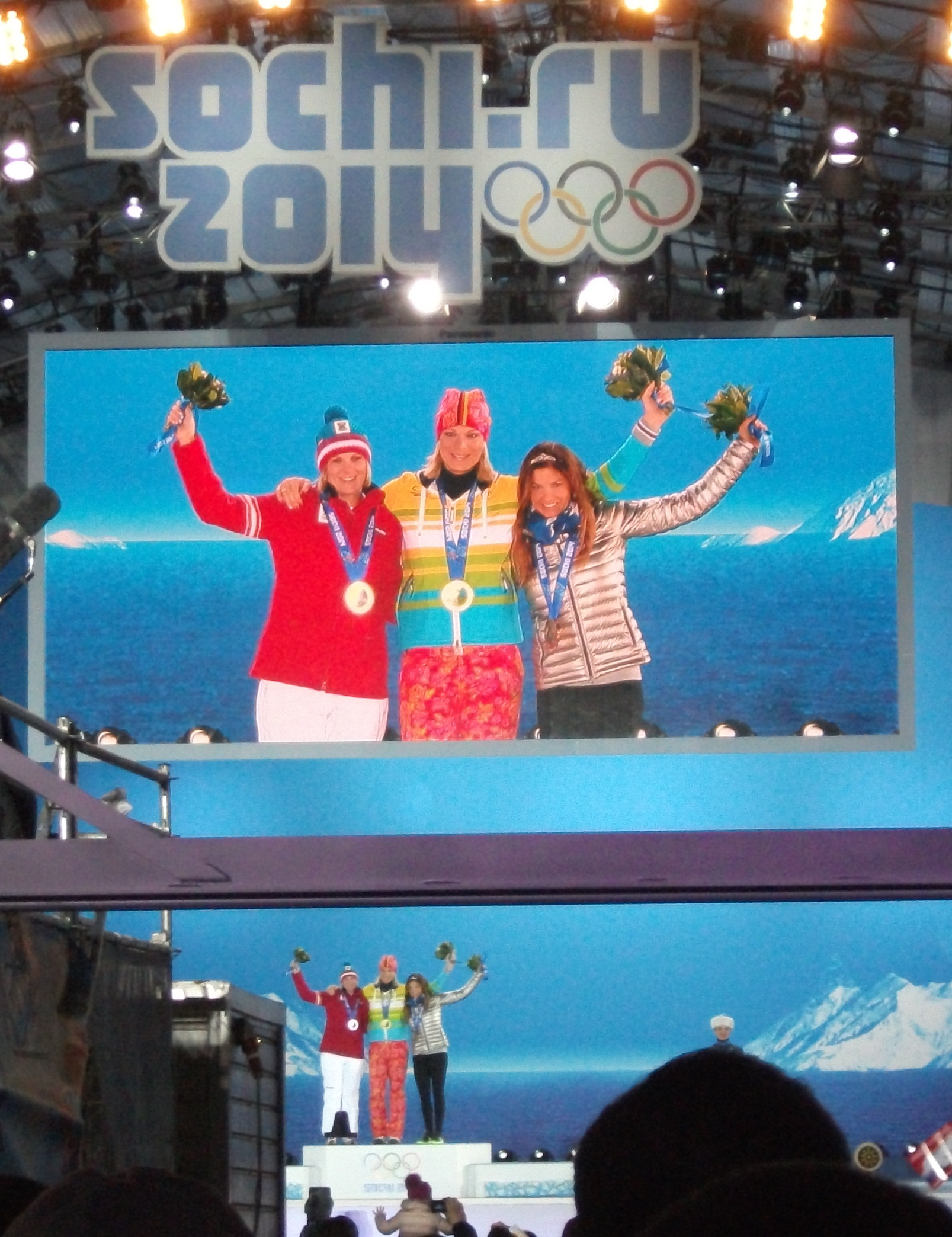
The medalists in ladies' super combined

Two gold medals, one to Slovenia and one to Switzerland, were awarded for a first-place tie in the women's downhill event. No silver medal was awarded.

Event	Gold	Silver	Bronze
Downhill	Dominique Gisin; Switzerland	Not awarded	Lara Gut; Switzerland
Downhill	Tina Maze; Slovenia	Not awarded	Lara Gut; Switzerland
Super-G	Anna Fenninger; Austria	Maria Höfl-Riesch; Germany	Nicole Hosp; Austria
Giant slalom	Tina Maze; Slovenia	Anna Fenninger; Austria	Viktoria Rebensburg; Germany
Slalom	Mikaela Shiffrin; United States	Marlies Schild; Austria	Kathrin Zettel; Austria
Combined	Maria Höfl-Riesch; Germany	Nicole Hosp; Austria	Julia Mancuso; United States

== Biathlon ==
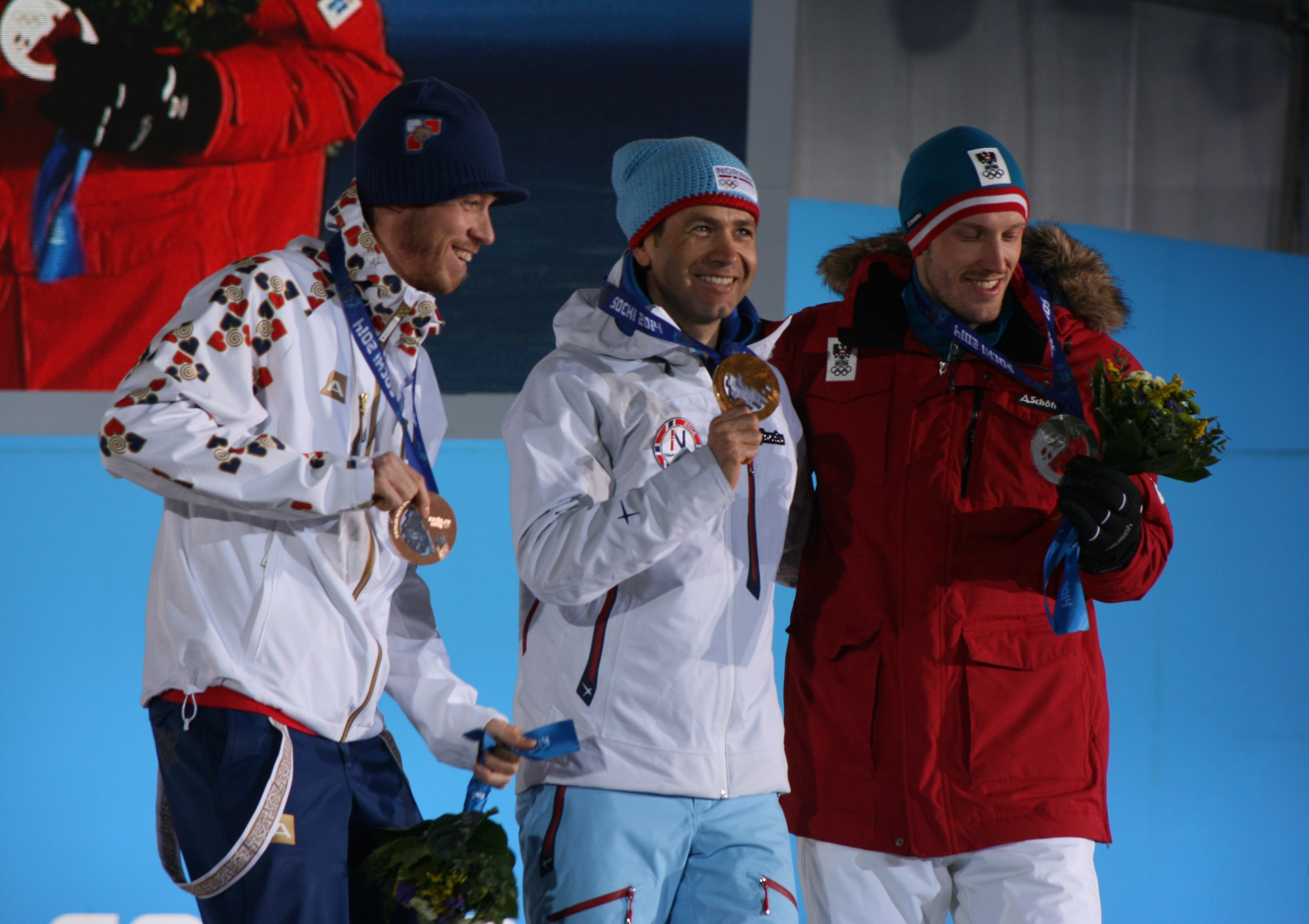
The medalists in men's biathlon sprint

=== Men's events ===
Event	Gold	Silver	Bronze
Individual	Martin Fourcade; France	Erik Lesser; Germany	Evgeniy Garanichev; Russia
Sprint	Ole Einar Bjørndalen; Norway	Dominik Landertinger; Austria	Jaroslav Soukup; Czech Republic
Pursuit	Martin Fourcade; France	Ondřej Moravec; Czech Republic	Jean-Guillaume Béatrix; France
Mass start	Emil Hegle Svendsen; Norway	Martin Fourcade; France	Ondřej Moravec; Czech Republic
Relay	Russia; Alexey Volkov; Evgeny Ustyugov; Dmitry Malyshko; Anton Shipulin	Germany; Erik Lesser; Daniel Böhm; Arnd Peiffer; Simon Schempp	Austria; Christoph Sumann; Daniel Mesotitsch; Simon Eder; Dominik Landertinger

=== Women's events ===
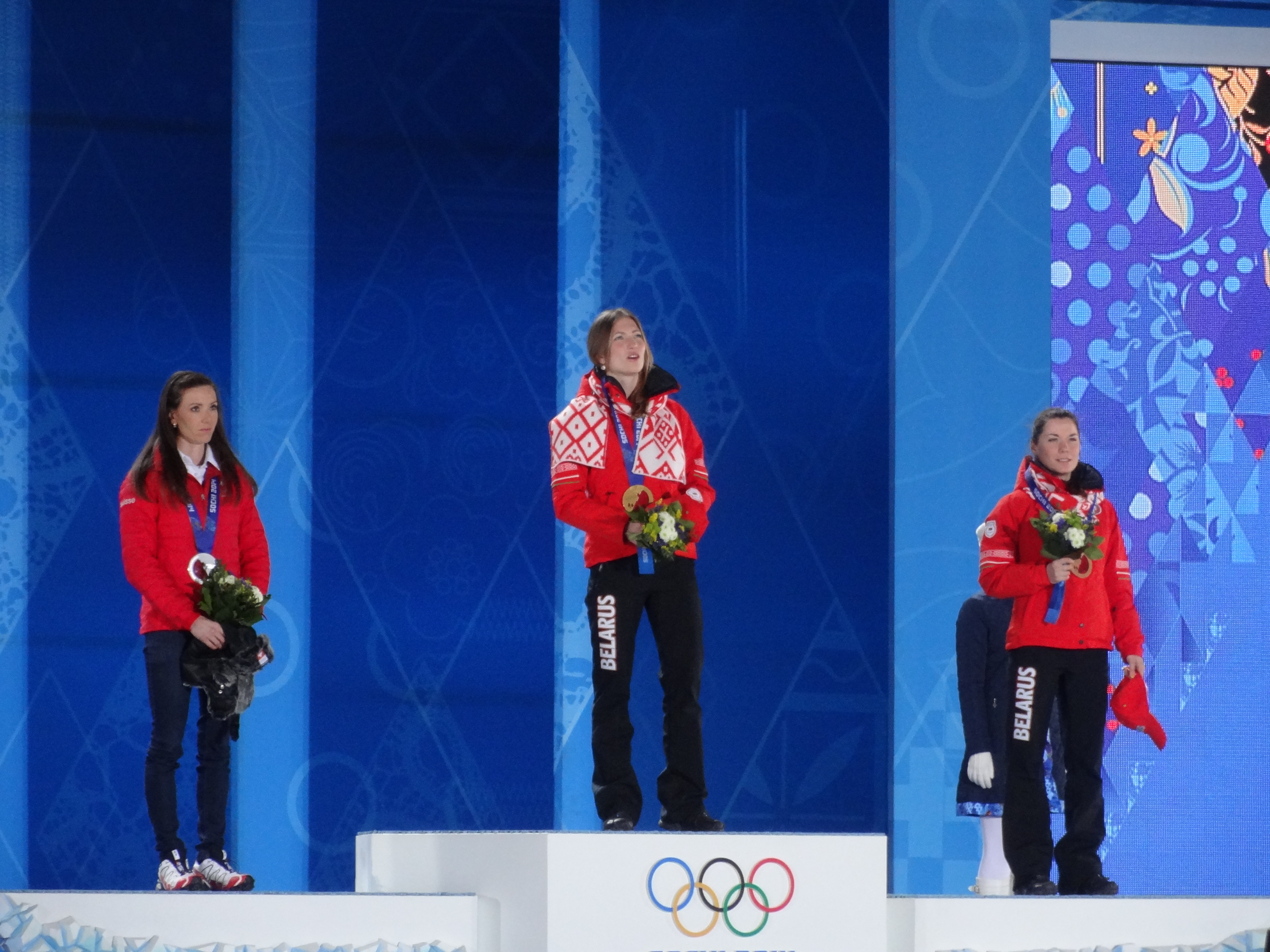
The medalists in women's individual

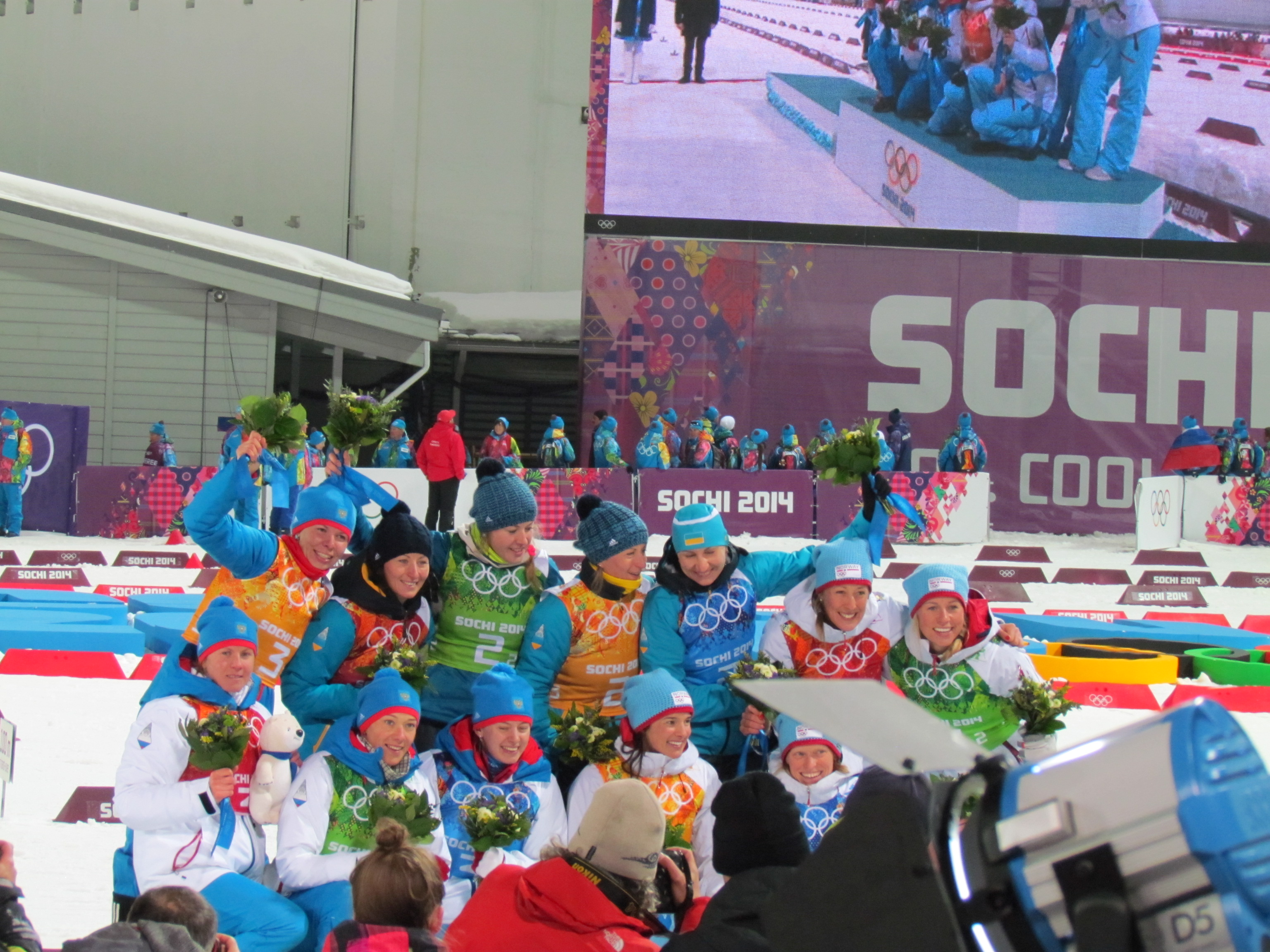
Biathlon women relay medalists. Russian team was later stripped of its medal.

Event	Gold	Silver	Bronze
Individual	Darya Domracheva; Belarus	Selina Gasparin; Switzerland	Nadezhda Skardino; Belarus
Sprint	Anastasiya Kuzmina; Slovakia	Olga Vilukhina; Russia	Vita Semerenko; Ukraine
Pursuit	Darya Domracheva; Belarus	Tora Berger; Norway	Teja Gregorin; Slovenia
Mass start	Darya Domracheva; Belarus	Gabriela Soukalová; Czech Republic	Tiril Eckhoff; Norway
Relay	Ukraine; Vita Semerenko; Juliya Dzhyma; Valentyna Semerenko; Olena Pidhrushna	Vacant	Norway; Fanny Welle-Strand Horn; Tiril Eckhoff; Ann Kristin Aafeldt Flatland; Tora Berger

=== Mixed events ===
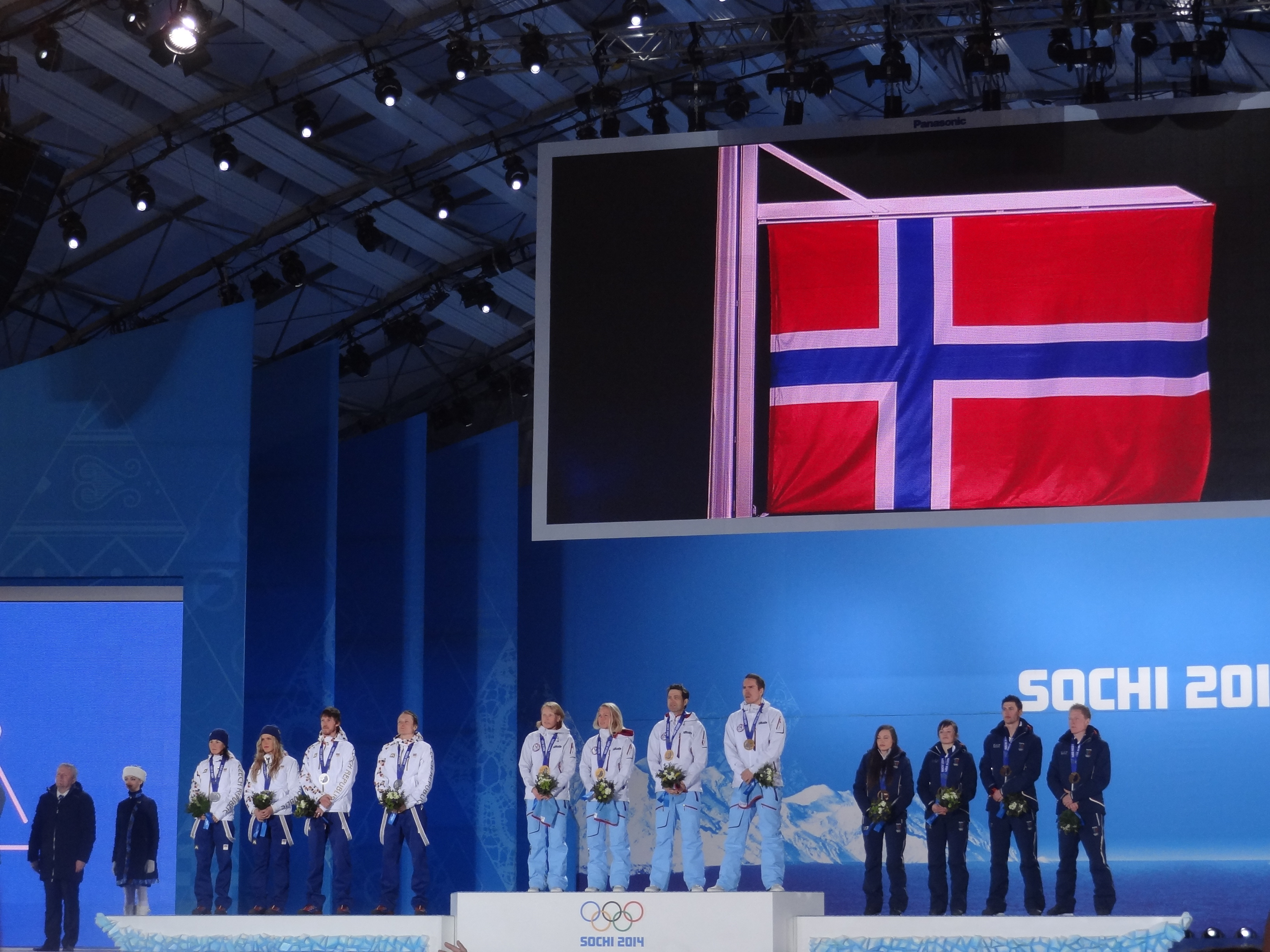
The medalists in biathlon mixed

Event	Gold	Silver	Bronze
Relay	Norway; Tora Berger; Tiril Eckhoff; Ole Einar Bjørndalen; Emil Hegle Svendsen	Czech Republic; Veronika Vítková; Gabriela Soukalová; Jaroslav Soukup; Ondřej Moravec	Italy; Dorothea Wierer; Karin Oberhofer; Dominik Windisch; Lukas Hofer

== Bobsleigh ==
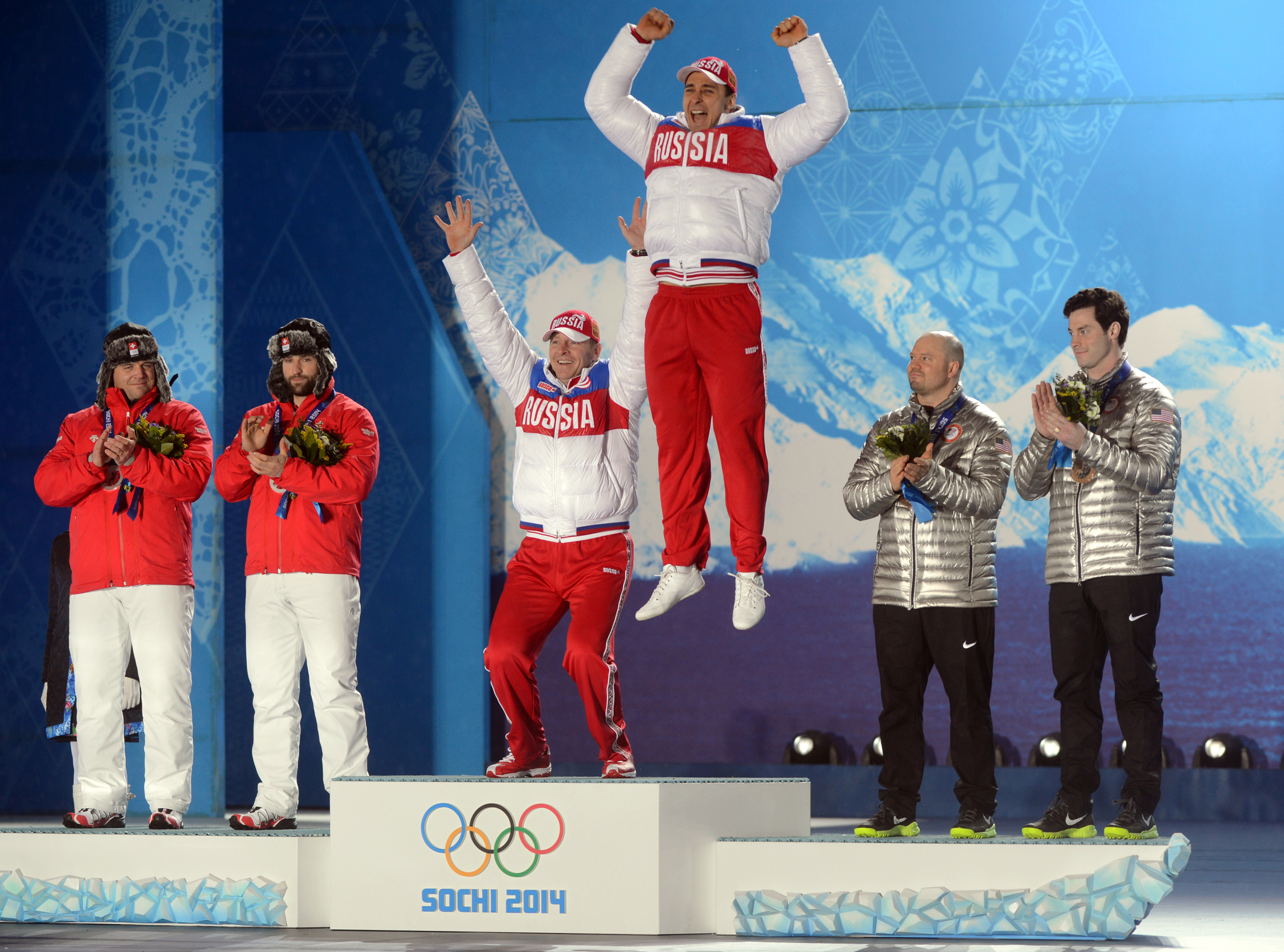
The medalists in bobsleigh two-man. Both Russian gold medalists were disqualified in 2017.

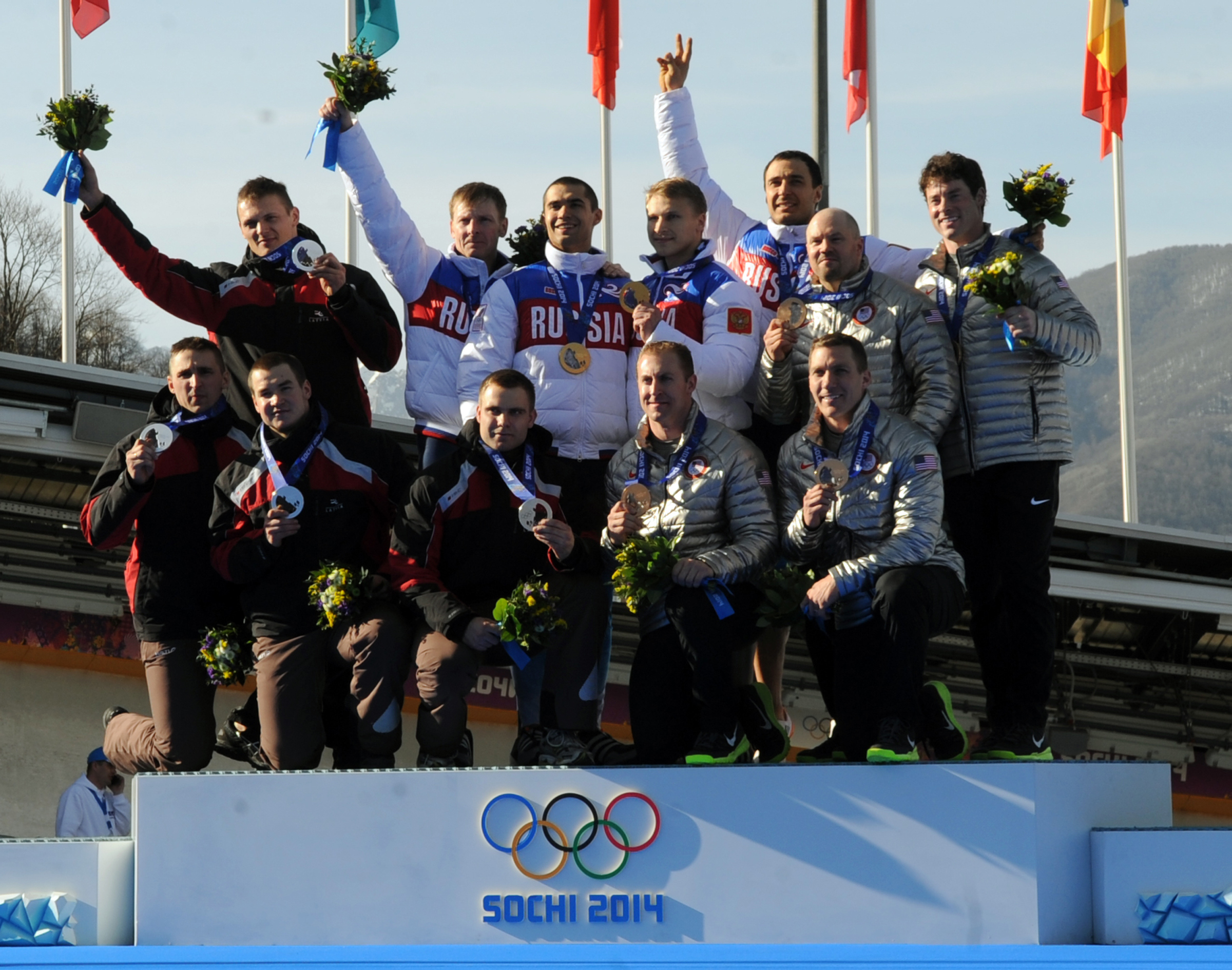
The medalists in bobsleigh four-man. All four Russian gold medalists were later found guilty of doping.

Event	Gold	Silver	Bronze
Two-man	Switzerland; Beat Hefti; Alex Baumann	United States; Steven Holcomb; Steven Langton	Latvia; Oskars Melbārdis; Daumants Dreiskens
Four-man	Latvia; Oskars Melbārdis; Arvis Vilkaste; Daumants Dreiškens; Jānis Strenga	United States; Steven Holcomb; Steven Langton; Curtis Tomasevicz; Christopher Fogt	Great Britain; John James Jackson; Stuart Benson; Bruce Tasker; Joel Fearon
Two-woman	Canada; Kaillie Humphries; Heather Moyse	United States; Elana Meyers; Lauryn Williams	United States; Jamie Greubel; Aja Evans

== Cross-country skiing ==
=== Men's events ===
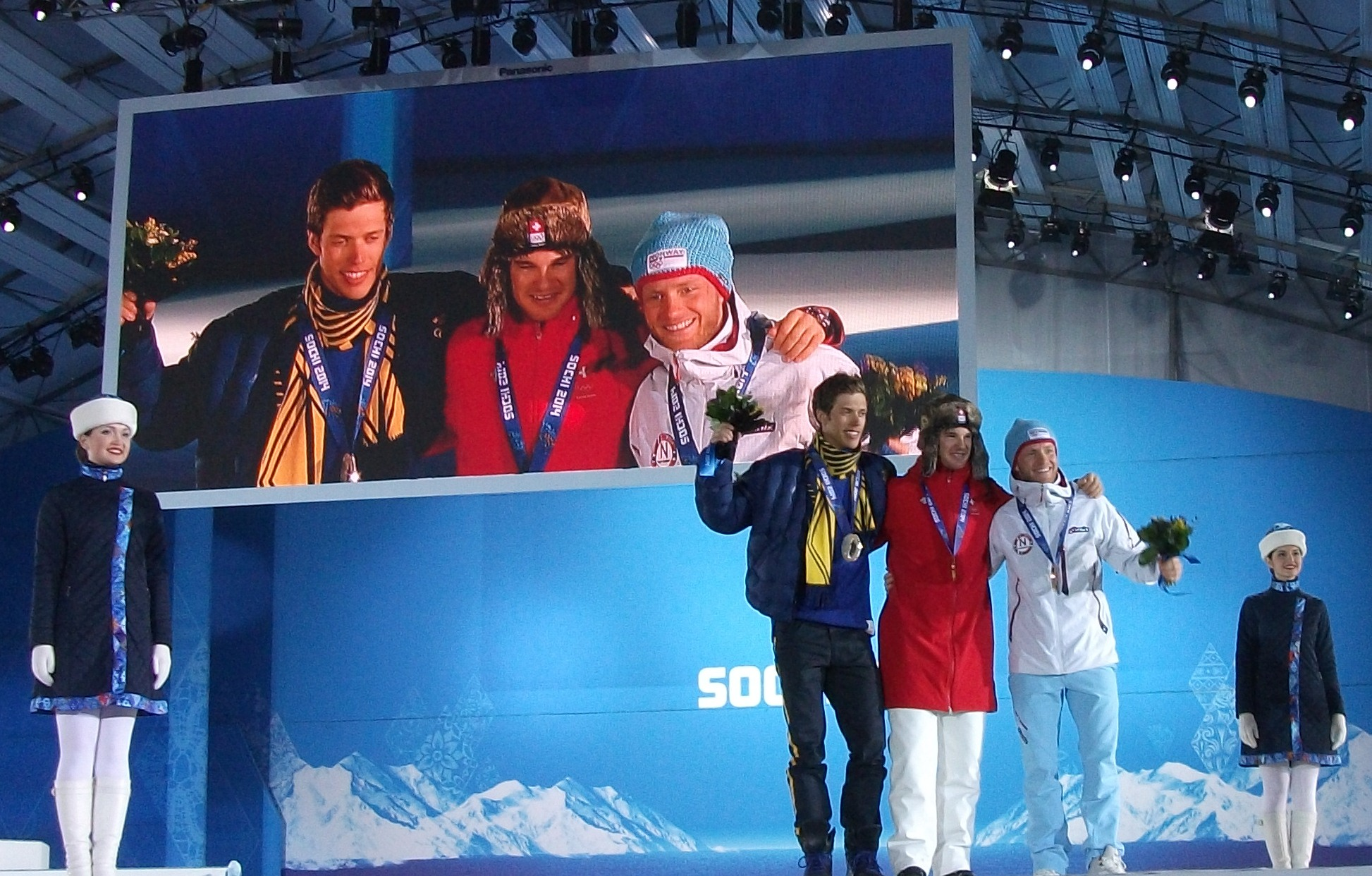
The medalists in skiathlon

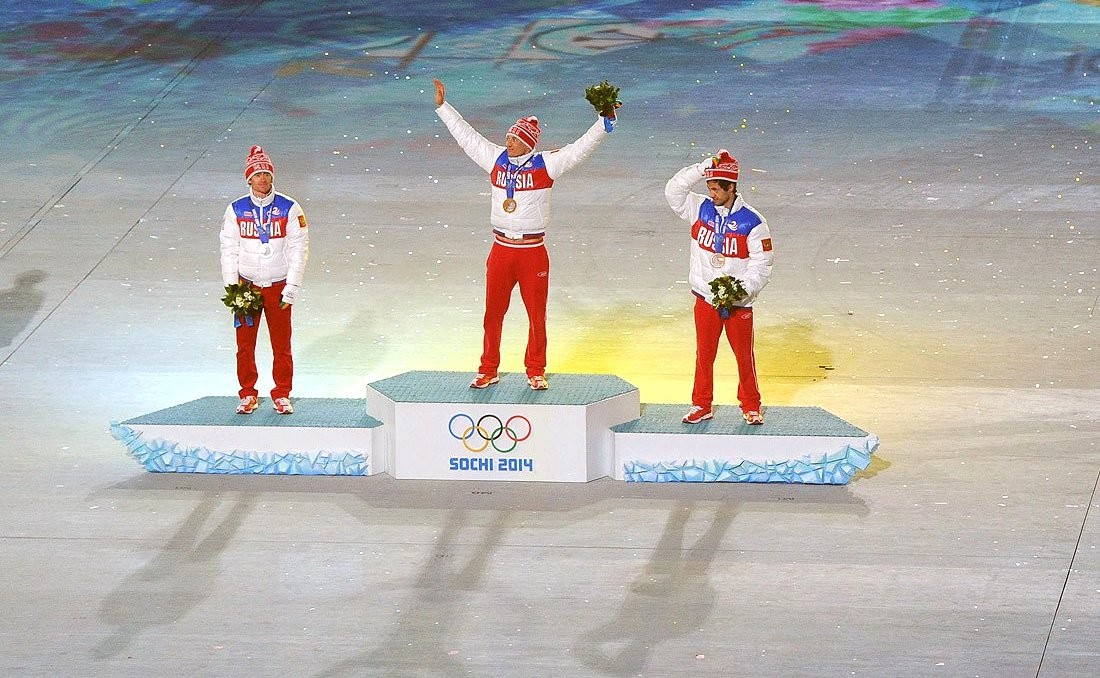
The medalists in 50 km freestyle.

Event	Gold	Silver	Bronze
15 kilometre classical	Dario Cologna; Switzerland	Johan Olsson; Sweden	Daniel Richardsson; Sweden
30 kilometre skiathlon	Dario Cologna; Switzerland	Marcus Hellner; Sweden	Martin Johnsrud Sundby; Norway
50 kilometre freestyle	Alexander Legkov; Russia	Maxim Vylegzhanin; Russia	Ilia Chernousov; Russia
4 × 10 kilometre relay	Sweden; Lars Nelson; Daniel Richardsson; Johan Olsson; Marcus Hellner	Russia; Dmitry Japarov; Alexander Bessmertnykh; Alexander Legkov; Maxim Vylegzhanin	France; Jean-Marc Gaillard; Maurice Manificat; Robin Duvillard; Ivan Perrillat Boiteux
Sprint	Ola Vigen Hattestad; Norway	Teodor Peterson; Sweden	Emil Jönsson; Sweden
Team sprint	Finland; Iivo Niskanen; Sami Jauhojärvi	Russia; Maxim Vylegzhanin; Nikita Kriukov	Sweden; Emil Jönsson; Teodor Peterson

=== Women's events ===
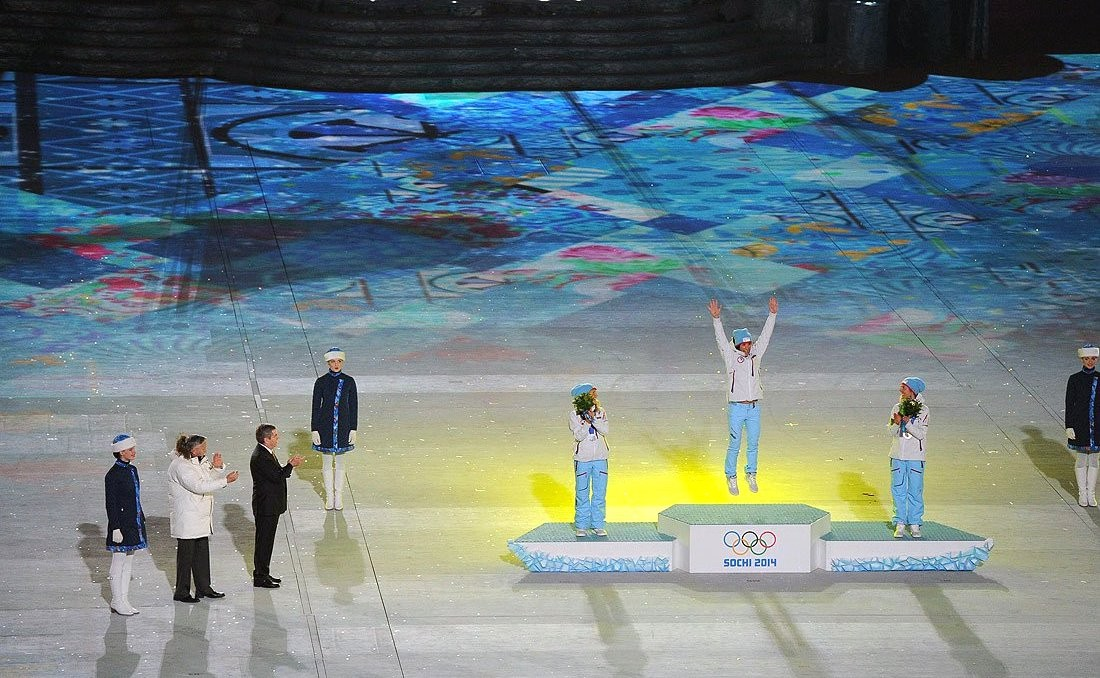
Ladies' 30 km Mass Start Free

Event	Gold	Silver	Bronze
10 kilometre classical	Justyna Kowalczyk; Poland	Charlotte Kalla; Sweden	Therese Johaug; Norway
15 kilometre skiathlon	Marit Bjørgen; Norway	Charlotte Kalla; Sweden	Heidi Weng; Norway
30 kilometre freestyle	Marit Bjørgen; Norway	Therese Johaug; Norway	Kristin Størmer Steira; Norway
4 × 5 kilometre relay	Sweden; Ida Ingemarsdotter; Emma Wikén; Anna Haag; Charlotte Kalla	Finland; Anne Kyllönen; Aino-Kaisa Saarinen; Kerttu Niskanen; Krista Lähteenmäki	Germany; Nicole Fessel; Stefanie Böhler; Claudia Nystad; Denise Herrmann
Sprint	Maiken Caspersen Falla; Norway	Ingvild Flugstad Østberg; Norway	Vesna Fabjan; Slovenia
Team sprint	Norway; Ingvild Flugstad Østberg; Marit Bjørgen	Finland; Aino-Kaisa Saarinen; Kerttu Niskanen	Sweden; Ida Ingemarsdotter; Stina Nilsson

== Curling ==
Event	Gold	Silver	Bronze
Men	Canada; Brad Jacobs; Ryan Fry; E. J. Harnden; Ryan Harnden; Caleb Flaxey	Great Britain; David Murdoch; Greg Drummond; Scott Andrews; Michael Goodfellow; Tom Brewster	Sweden; Niklas Edin; Sebastian Kraupp; Fredrik Lindberg; Viktor Kjäll; Oskar Eriksson
Women	Canada; Jennifer Jones; Kaitlyn Lawes; Jill Officer; Dawn McEwen; Kirsten Wall	Sweden; Margaretha Sigfridsson; Maria Wennerström; Christina Bertrup; Maria Prytz; Agnes Knochenhauer	Great Britain; Eve Muirhead; Anna Sloan; Vicki Adams; Claire Hamilton; Lauren Gray

== Figure skating ==
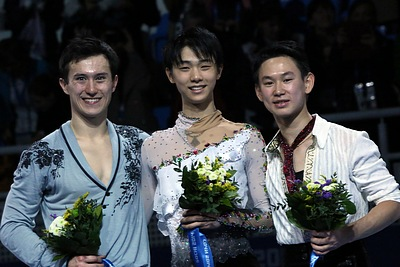
Men's singles medalists

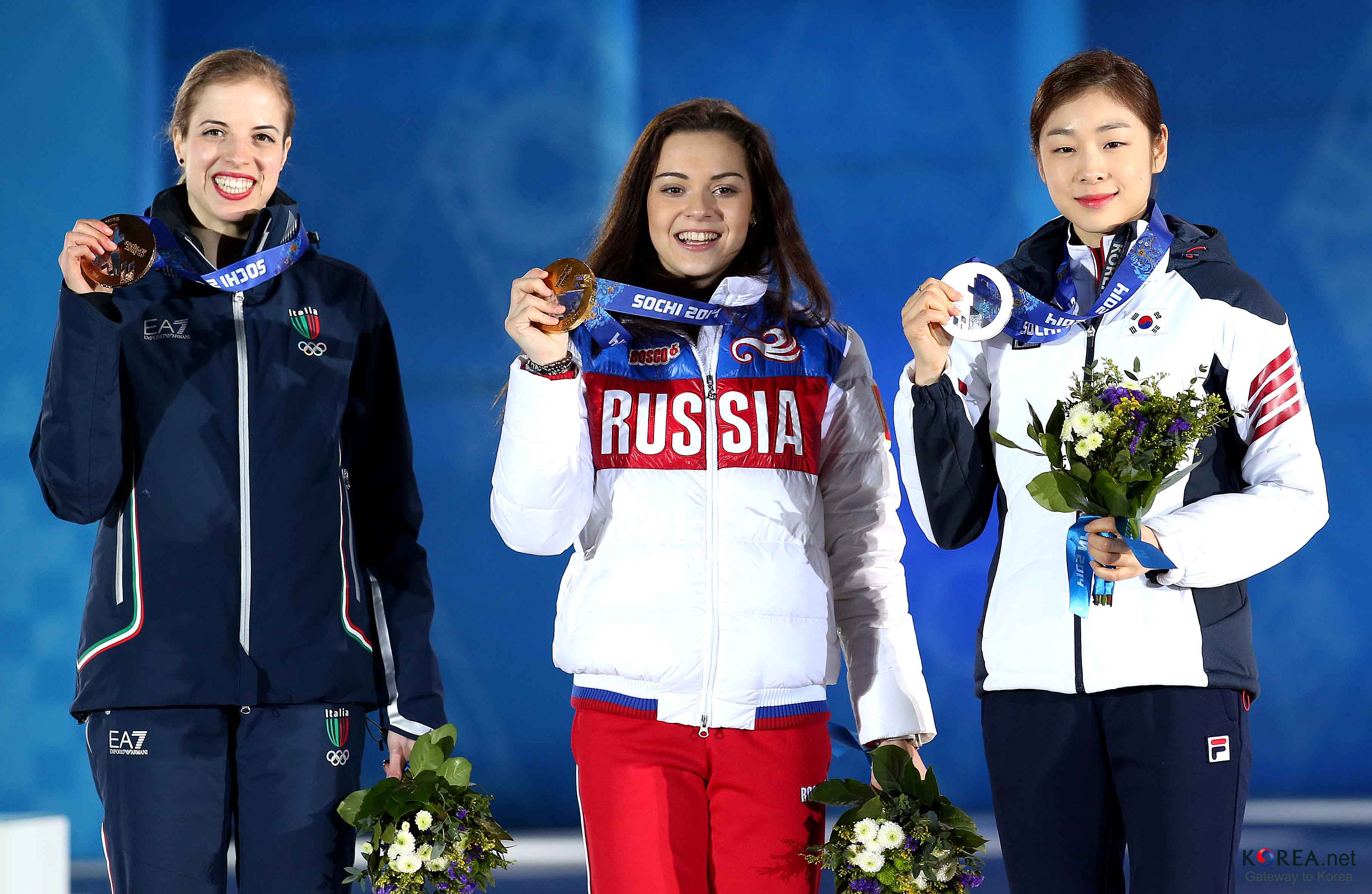
Ladies' singles medalists

Discipline	Gold	Silver	Bronze
Men's singles	Yuzuru Hanyu (JPN)	Patrick Chan (CAN)	Denis Ten (KAZ)
Ladies' singles	Adelina Sotnikova (RUS)	Yuna Kim (KOR)	Carolina Kostner (ITA)
Pair skating	Russia; Tatiana Volosozhar; Maxim Trankov	Russia; Ksenia Stolbova; Fedor Klimov	Germany; Aliona Savchenko; Robin Szolkowy
Ice dancing	United States; Meryl Davis; Charlie White	Canada; Tessa Virtue; Scott Moir	Russia; Elena Ilinykh; Nikita Katsalapov
Team trophy	Russia; Evgeni Plushenko; Yulia Lipnitskaya; Ksenia Stolbova / Fedor Klimov**; Elena Ilinykh / Nikita Katsalapov**; Tatiana Volosozhar / Maxim Trankov*; Ekaterina Bobrova / Dmitri Soloviev*	Canada; Kevin Reynolds**; Kaetlyn Osmond; Kirsten Moore-Towers / Dylan Moscovitch**; Tessa Virtue / Scott Moir; Patrick Chan*; Meagan Duhamel / Eric Radford*	United States; Jason Brown**; Gracie Gold**; Marissa Castelli / Simon Shnapir; Meryl Davis / Charlie White; Jeremy Abbott*; Ashley Wagner*

*Indicates the athlete(s) only competed in the short program/dance.
**Indicates the athlete(s) only competed in the long program/dance.

== Freestyle skiing ==
=== Men's events ===
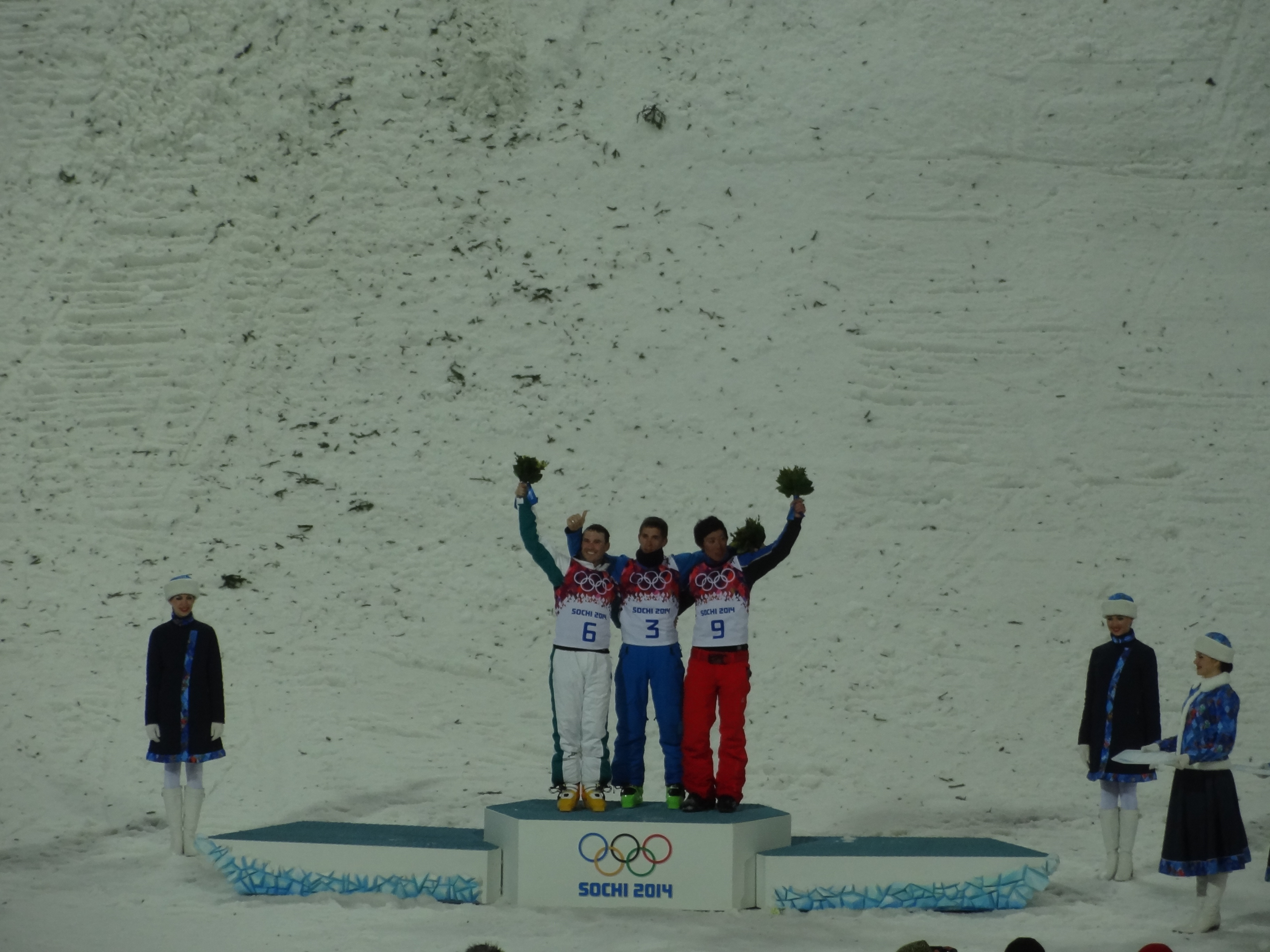
Men's aerials medalists

Event	Gold	Silver	Bronze
aerials	Anton Kushnir; Belarus	David Morris; Australia	Jia Zongyang; China
halfpipe	David Wise; United States	Mike Riddle; Canada	Kevin Rolland; France
moguls	Alexandre Bilodeau; Canada	Mikaël Kingsbury; Canada	Alexandr Smyshlyaev; Russia
slopestyle	Joss Christensen; United States	Gus Kenworthy; United States	Nick Goepper; United States
ski cross	Jean-Frédéric Chapuis; France	Arnaud Bovolenta; France	Jonathan Midol; France

=== Women's events ===
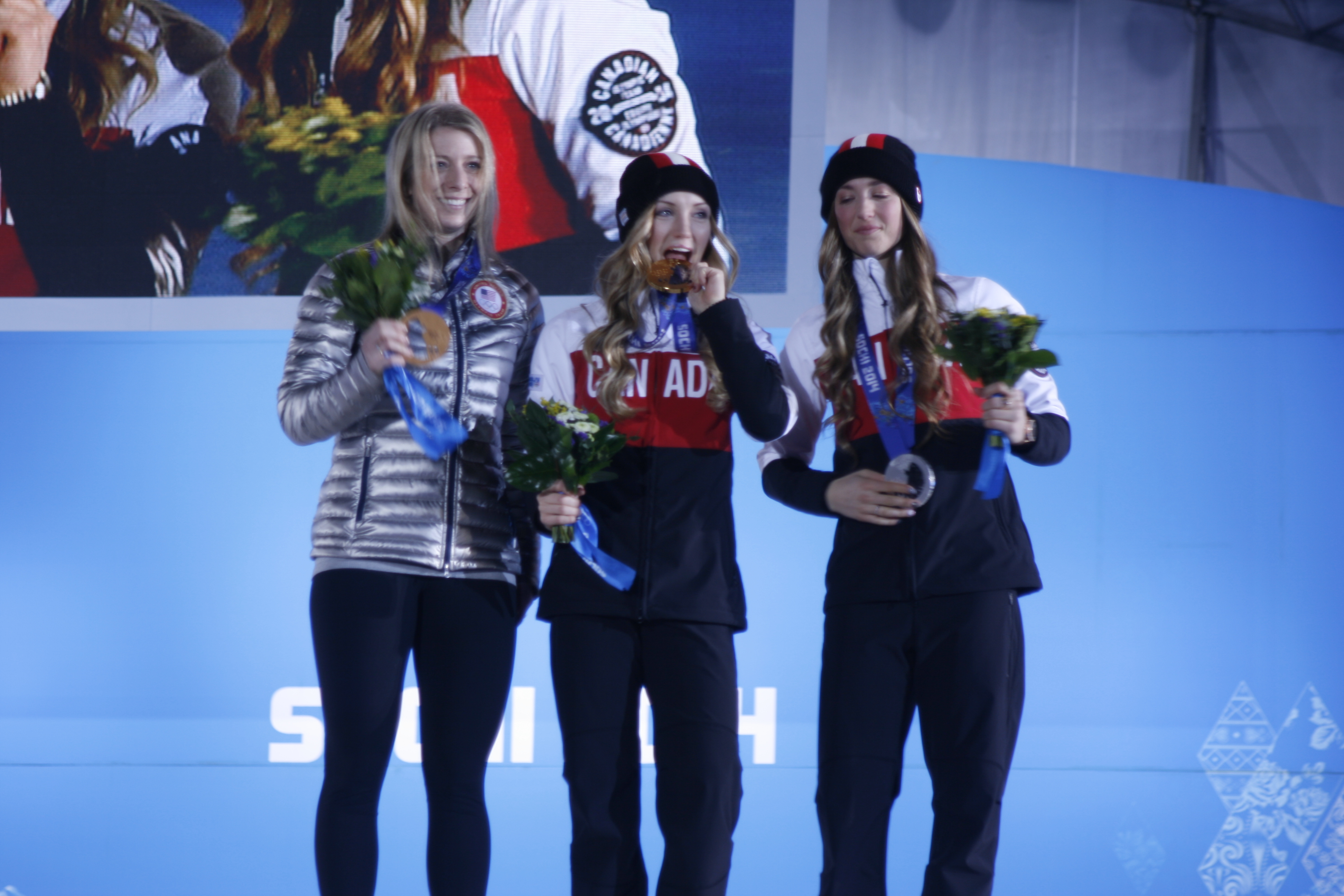
Women's mogul medalists

Event	Gold	Silver	Bronze
aerials	Alla Tsuper; Belarus	Xu Mengtao; China	Lydia Lassila; Australia
halfpipe	Maddie Bowman; United States	Marie Martinod; France	Ayana Onozuka; Japan
moguls	Justine Dufour-Lapointe; Canada	Chloé Dufour-Lapointe; Canada	Hannah Kearney; United States
slopestyle	Dara Howell; Canada	Devin Logan; United States	Kim Lamarre; Canada
ski cross	Marielle Thompson; Canada	Kelsey Serwa; Canada	Anna Holmlund; Sweden

== Ice hockey ==
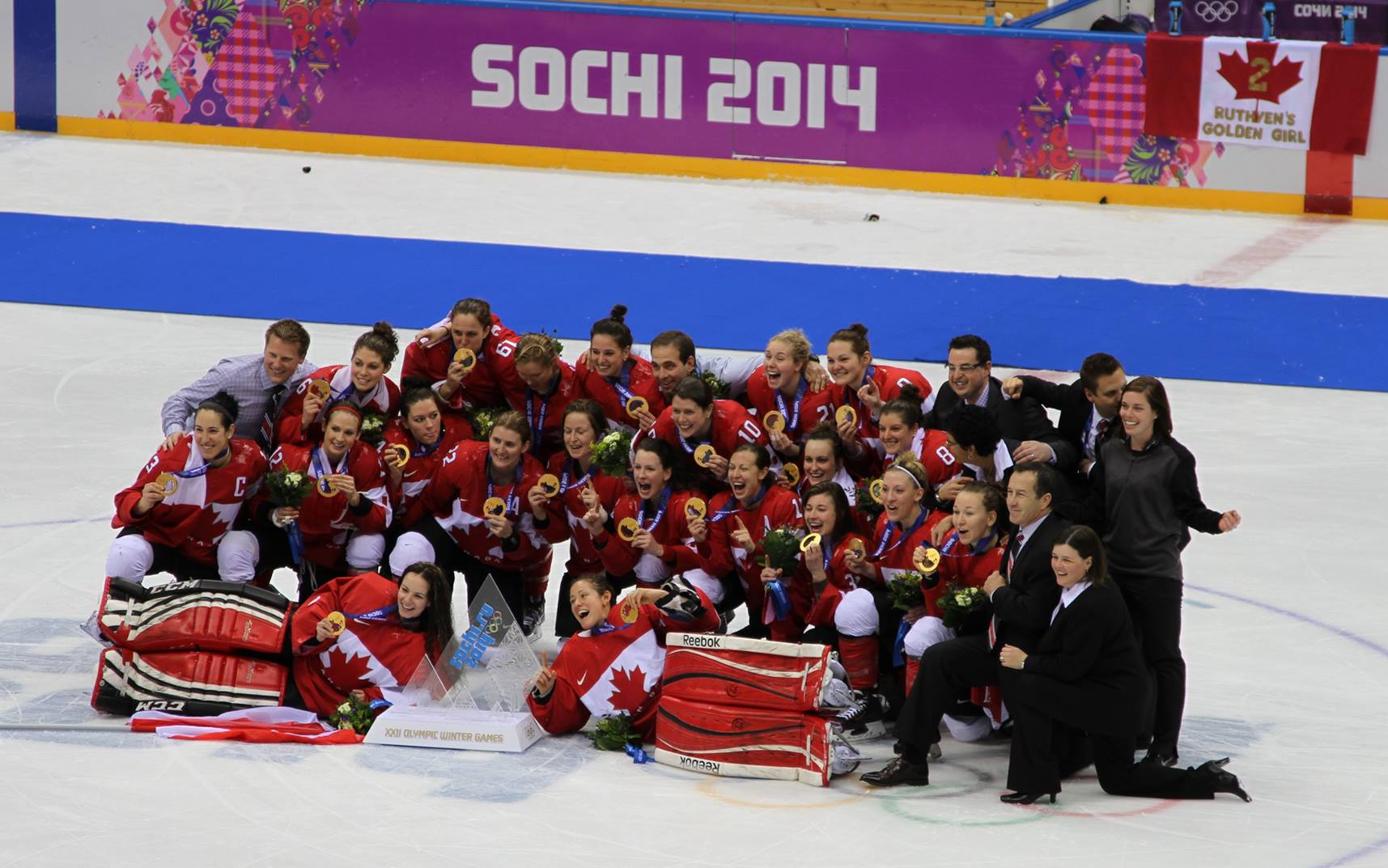
Women's gold medal team Canada

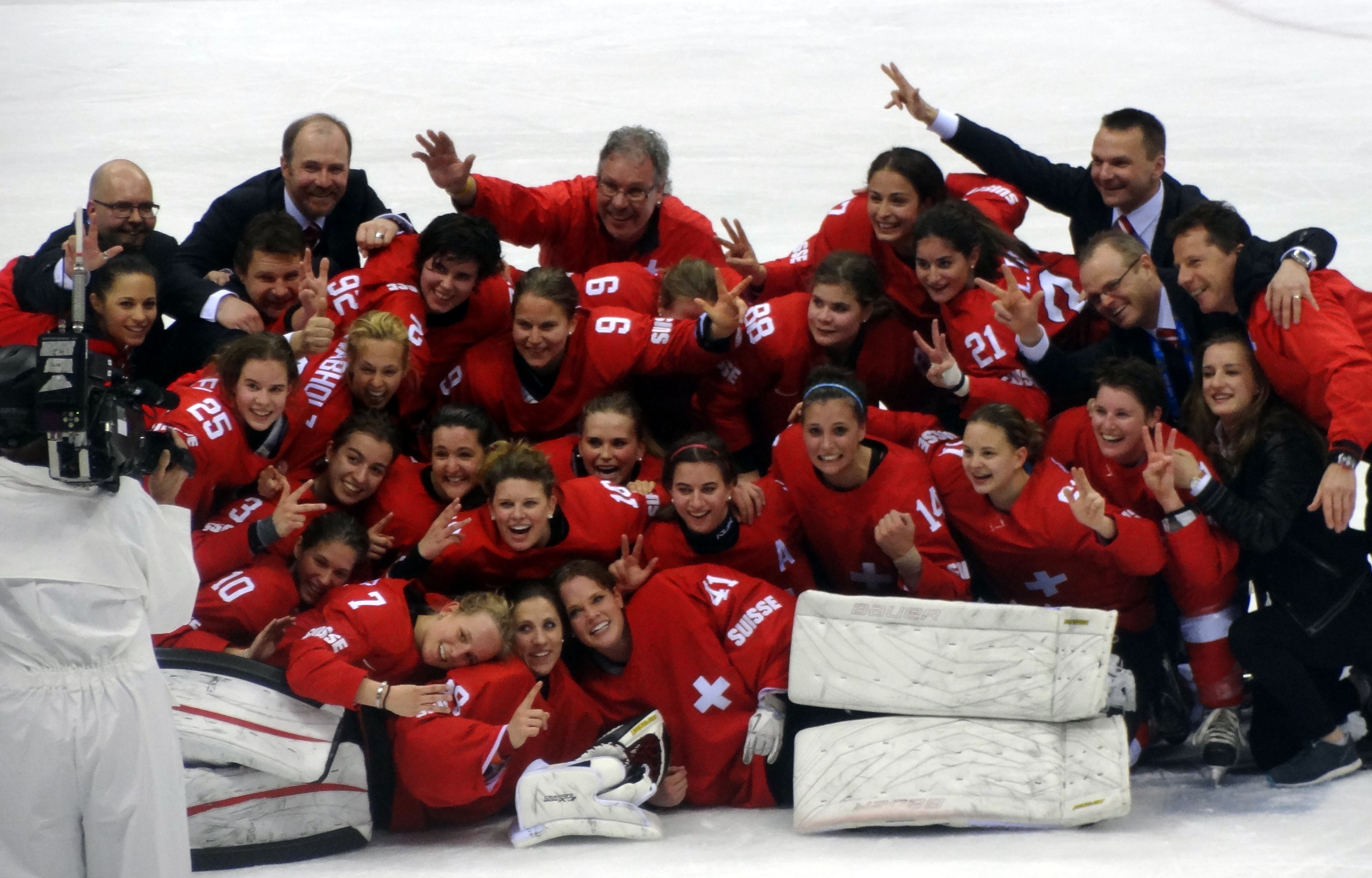
Women's bronze medal team Switzerland

Discipline	Gold	Silver	Bronze
Men's tournament	Canada; Jamie Benn; Patrice Bergeron; Jay Bouwmeester; Jeff Carter; Sidney Crosby; Drew Doughty; Matt Duchene; Ryan Getzlaf; Dan Hamhuis; Duncan Keith; Chris Kunitz; Roberto Luongo; Patrick Marleau; Rick Nash; Corey Perry; Alex Pietrangelo; Carey Price; Patrick Sharp; Mike Smith; Martin St. Louis; P. K. Subban; John Tavares; Jonathan Toews; Marc-Édouard Vlasic; Shea Weber	Sweden; Daniel Alfredsson; Nicklas Bäckström; Patrik Berglund; Alexander Edler; Oliver Ekman-Larsson; Jhonas Enroth; Jimmie Ericsson; Jonathan Ericsson; Loui Eriksson; Jonas Gustavsson; Carl Hagelin; Niklas Hjalmarsson; Marcus Johansson; Erik Karlsson; Niklas Kronwall; Marcus Krüger; Gabriel Landeskog; Henrik Lundqvist; Gustav Nyquist; Johnny Oduya; Daniel Sedin; Jakob Silfverberg; Alexander Steen; Henrik Tallinder; Henrik Zetterberg	Finland; Juhamatti Aaltonen; Aleksander Barkov; Mikael Granlund; Juuso Hietanen; Jarkko Immonen; Jussi Jokinen; Olli Jokinen; Leo Komarov; Sami Lepistö; Petri Kontiola; Lauri Korpikoski; Lasse Kukkonen; Jori Lehterä; Kari Lehtonen; Olli Määttä; Antti Niemi; Antti Pihlström; Tuukka Rask; Tuomo Ruutu; Sakari Salminen; Sami Salo; Teemu Selänne; Kimmo Timonen; Ossi Väänänen; Sami Vatanen
Women's tournament	Canada; Meghan Agosta-Marciano; Gillian Apps; Mélodie Daoust; Laura Fortino; Jayna Hefford; Haley Irwin; Brianne Jenner; Rebecca Johnston; Charline Labonté; Geneviève Lacasse; Jocelyne Larocque; Meaghan Mikkelson-Reid; Caroline Ouellette; Marie-Philip Poulin; Lauriane Rougeau; Natalie Spooner; Shannon Szabados; Jenn Wakefield; Catherine Ward; Tara Watchorn; Hayley Wickenheiser	United States; Kacey Bellamy; Megan Bozek; Alex Carpenter; Julie Chu; Kendall Coyne; Brianna Decker; Meghan Duggan; Lyndsey Fry; Amanda Kessel; Hilary Knight; Jocelyne Lamoureux; Monique Lamoureux-Kolls; Gisele Marvin; Brianne McLaughlin; Michelle Picard; Josephine Pucci; Molly Schaus; Anne Schleper; Kelli Stack; Lee Stecklein; Jessie Vetter	Switzerland; Janine Alder; Livia Altmann; Sophie Anthamatten; Laura Benz; Sara Benz; Nicole Bullo; Romy Eggimann; Sarah Forster; Angela Frautschi; Jessica Lutz; Julia Marty; Stefanie Marty; Alina Müller; Katrin Nabholz; Evelina Raselli; Florence Schelling; Lara Stalder; Phoebe Stanz; Anja Stiefel; Sandra Thalmann; Nina Waidacher

== Luge ==
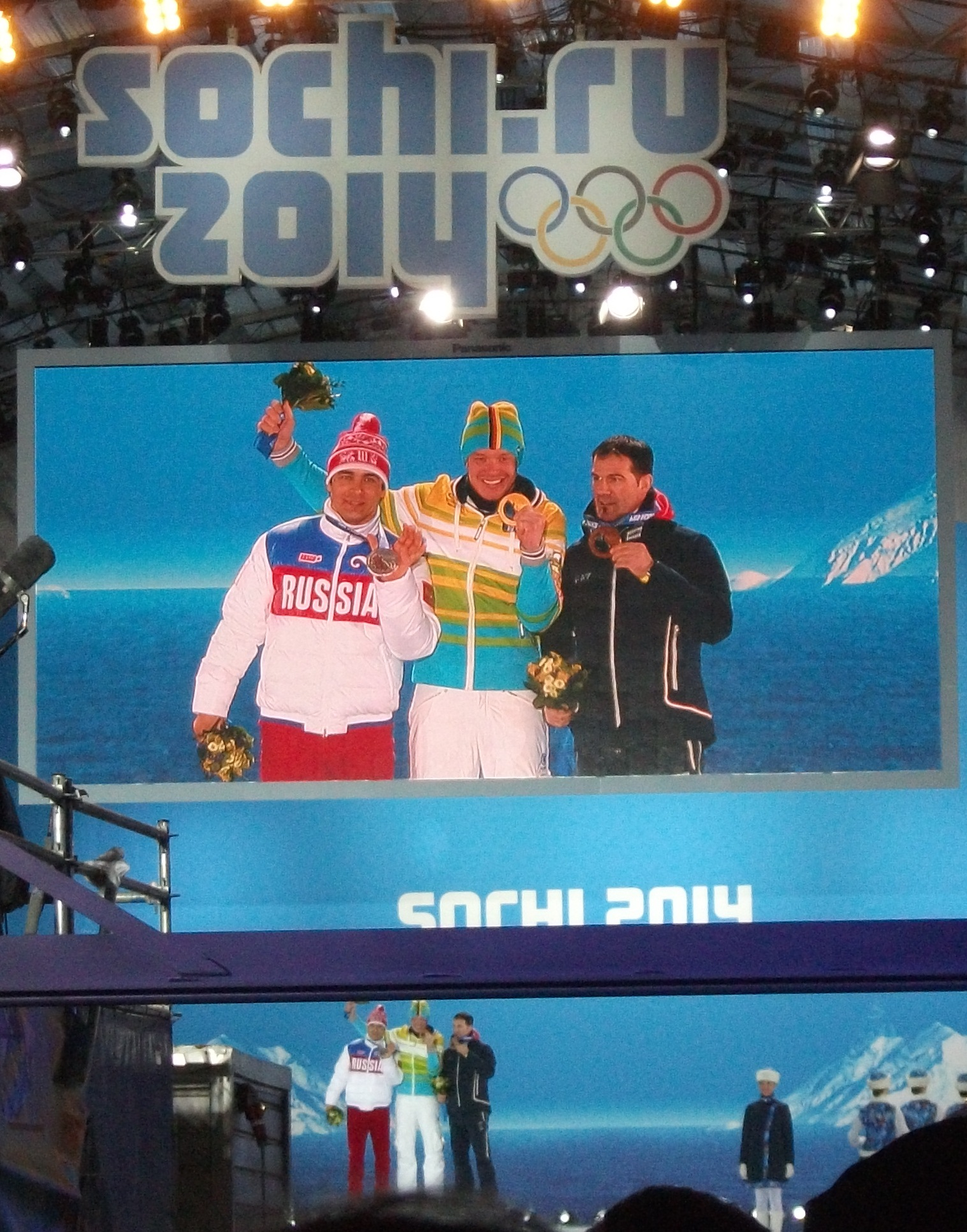
Luge men's singles medalists

Event	Gold	Silver	Bronze
Men's singles	Felix Loch; Germany	Albert Demchenko; Russia	Armin Zöggeler; Italy
Women's singles	Natalie Geisenberger; Germany	Tatjana Hüfner; Germany	Erin Hamlin; United States
Doubles	Germany; Tobias Wendl; Tobias Arlt	Austria; Andreas Linger; Wolfgang Linger	Latvia; Andris Šics; Juris Šics
Team relay	Germany; Natalie Geisenberger; Felix Loch; Tobias Wendl; Tobias Arlt	Russia; Tatiana Ivanova; Albert Demchenko; Alexander Denisyev; Vladislav Antonov	Latvia; Elīza Tīruma; Mārtiņš Rubenis; Andris Šics; Juris Šics

== Nordic combined ==
Event	Gold	Silver	Bronze
large hill/10 km	Jørgen Graabak; Norway	Magnus Hovdal Moan; Norway	Fabian Riessle; Germany
normal hill/10 km	Eric Frenzel; Germany	Akito Watabe; Japan	Magnus Krog; Norway
Team large hill/4 × 5 km	Norway; Magnus Hovdal Moan; Håvard Klemetsen; Magnus Krog; Jørgen Graabak	Germany; Eric Frenzel; Björn Kircheisen; Johannes Rydzek; Fabian Rießle	Austria; Christoph Bieler; Bernhard Gruber; Lukas Klapfer; Mario Stecher

== Short track speed skating ==
=== Men's events ===
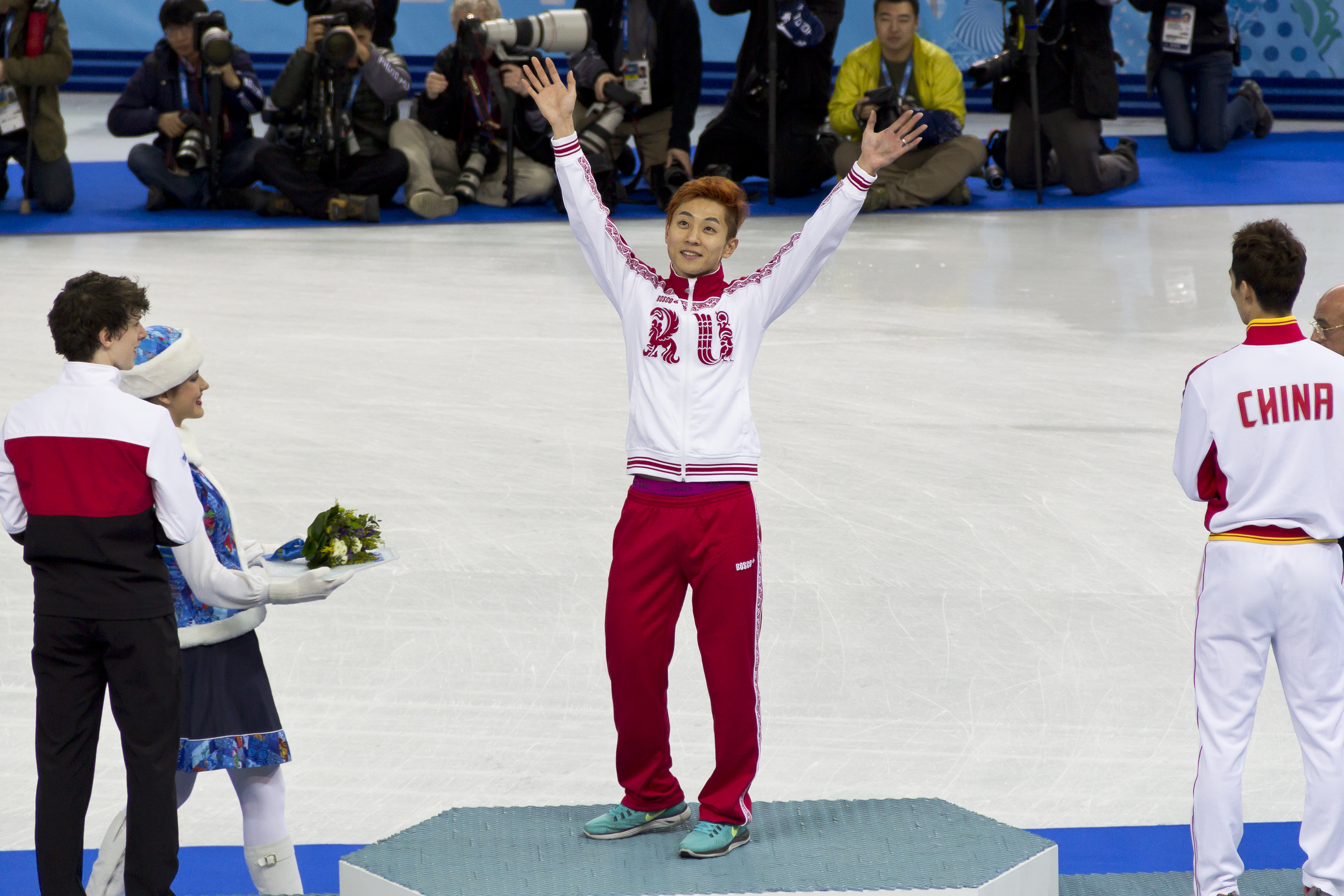
The medalists in men's 500 m short track speed skating

Event	Gold	Silver	Bronze
500 metres	Viktor Ahn; Russia	Wu Dajing; China	Charle Cournoyer; Canada
1000 metres	Viktor Ahn; Russia	Vladimir Grigorev; Russia	Sjinkie Knegt; Netherlands
1500 metres	Charles Hamelin; Canada	Han Tianyu; China	Viktor Ahn; Russia
5000 metre relay	Russia; Viktor Ahn; Semion Elistratov; Vladimir Grigorev; Ruslan Zakharov	United States; Eddy Alvarez; J. R. Celski; Christopher Creveling; Jordan Malone	China; Chen Dequan; Han Tianyu; Shi Jingnan; Wu Dajing

=== Women's events ===
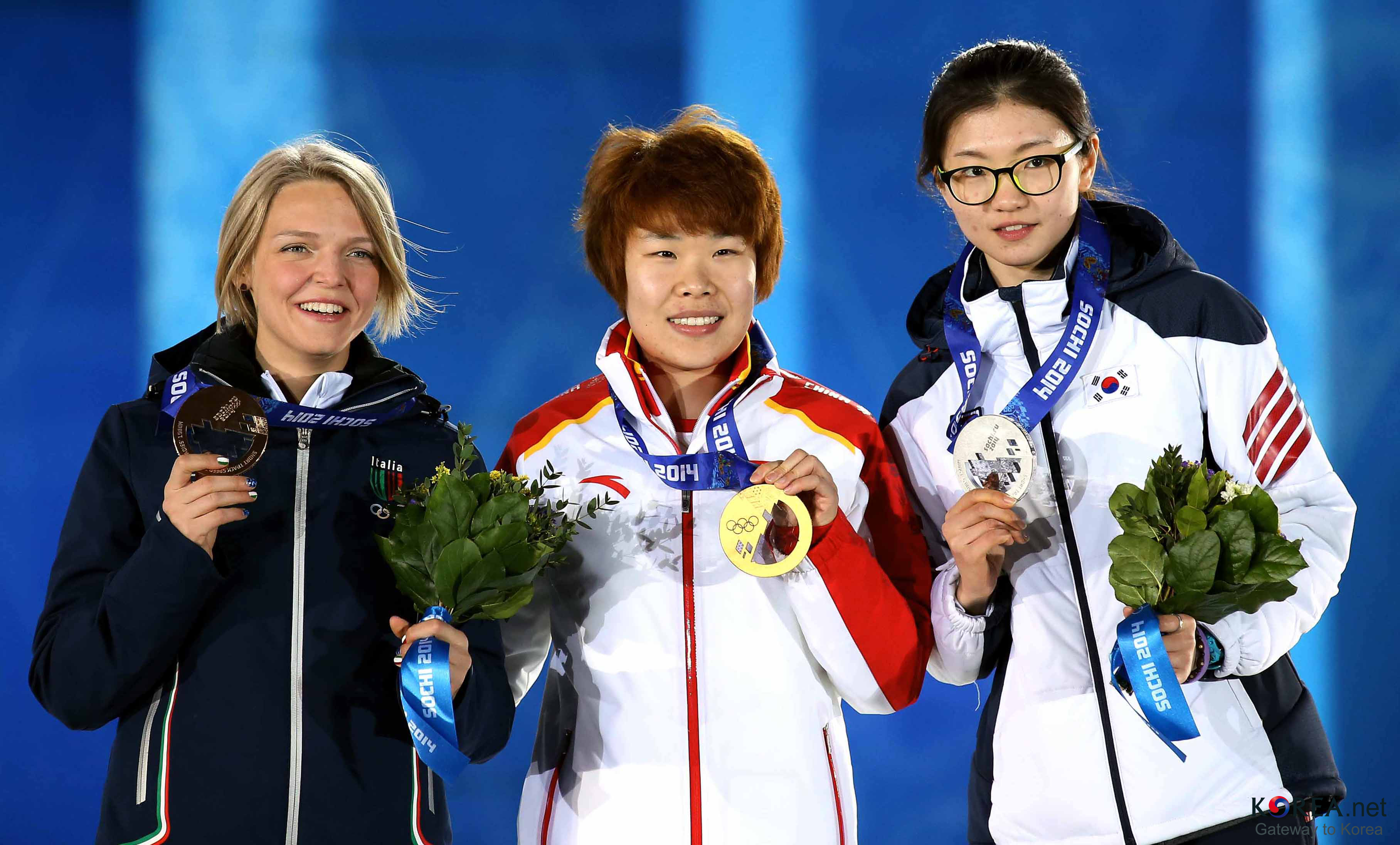
The madalists in ladies' 1500 m short track speed scating

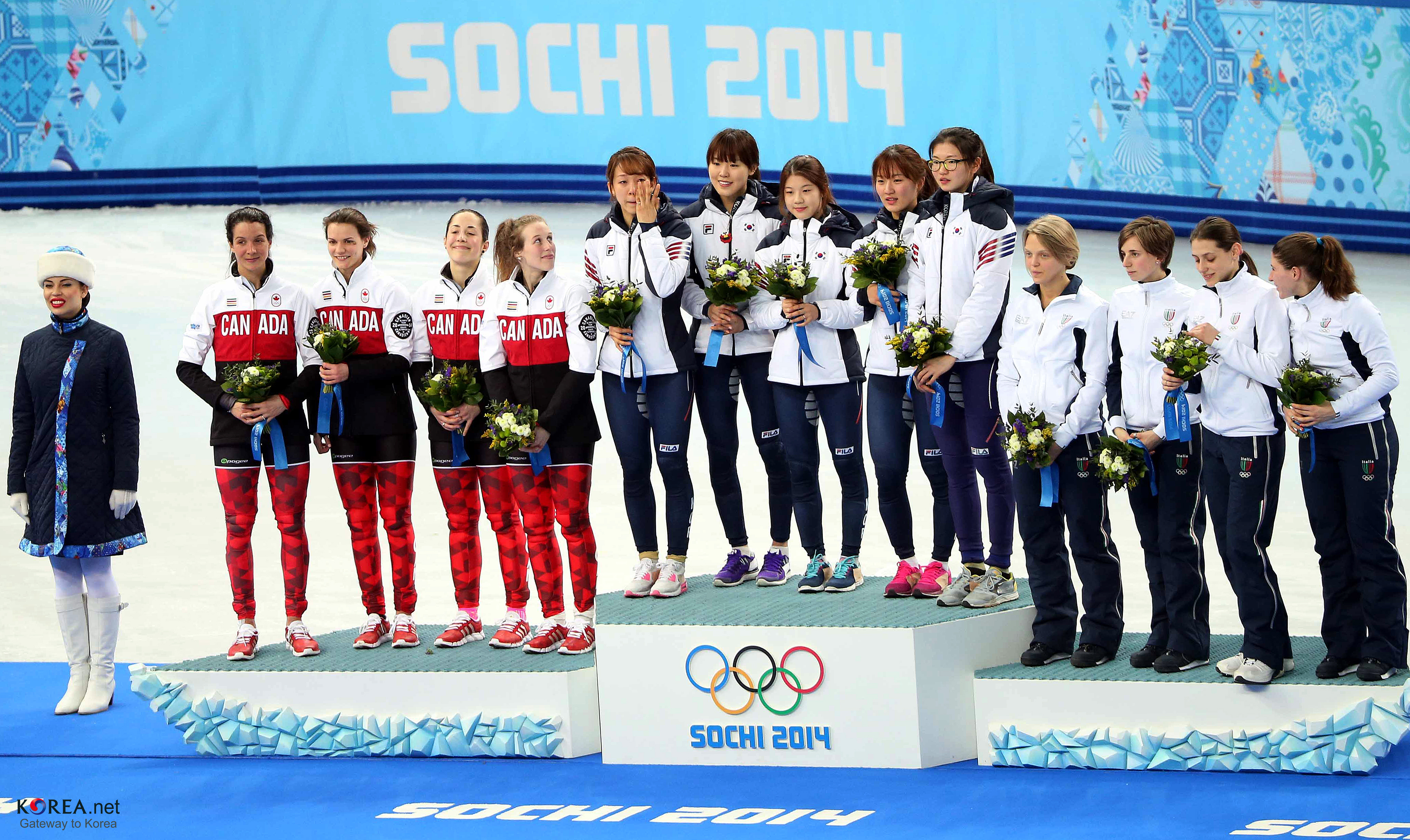
The medalists in the ladies' 3,000-meter short track relay

Event	Gold	Silver	Bronze
500 metres	Li Jianrou; China	Arianna Fontana; Italy	Park Seung-Hi; South Korea
1000 metres	Park Seung-Hi; South Korea	Fan Kexin; China	Shim Suk-Hee; South Korea
1500 metres	Zhou Yang; China	Shim Suk-Hee; South Korea	Arianna Fontana; Italy
3000 metre relay	South Korea; Shim Suk-Hee; Park Seung-Hi; Kim A-Lang; Kong Sang-Jeong; Cho Ha-Ri	Canada; Marie-Ève Drolet; Jessica Hewitt; Valérie Maltais; Marianne St-Gelais	Italy; Arianna Fontana; Lucia Peretti; Martina Valcepina; Elena Viviani

== Skeleton ==
Event	Gold	Silver	Bronze
Men's	Aleksandr Tretyakov; Russia	Martins Dukurs; Latvia	Matthew Antoine; United States
Women's	Lizzy Yarnold; Great Britain	Noelle Pikus-Pace; United States	Elena Nikitina; Russia

== Ski jumping ==
Event	Gold	Silver	Bronze
Men's individual normal hill	Kamil Stoch; Poland	Peter Prevc; Slovenia	Anders Bardal; Norway
Men's individual large hill	Kamil Stoch; Poland	Noriaki Kasai; Japan	Peter Prevc; Slovenia
Men's team large hill	Germany; Andreas Wank; Marinus Kraus; Andreas Wellinger; Severin Freund	Austria; Michael Hayböck; Thomas Morgenstern; Thomas Diethart; Gregor Schlierenzauer	Japan; Reruhi Shimizu; Taku Takeuchi; Daiki Ito; Noriaki Kasai
Women's individual normal hill	Carina Vogt; Germany	Daniela Iraschko-Stolz; Austria	Coline Mattel; France

== Snowboarding ==
=== Men's events ===
Event	Gold	Silver	Bronze
parallel slalom	Vic Wild; Russia	Žan Košir; Slovenia	Benjamin Karl; Austria
parallel giant slalom	Vic Wild; Russia	Nevin Galmarini; Switzerland	Zan Kosir; Slovenia
halfpipe	Iouri Podladtchikov; Switzerland	Ayumu Hirano; Japan	Taku Hiraoka; Japan
slopestyle	Sage Kotsenburg; United States	Ståle Sandbech; Norway	Mark McMorris; Canada
snowboard cross	Pierre Vaultier; France	Nikolay Olyunin; Russia	Alex Deibold; United States

=== Women's events ===
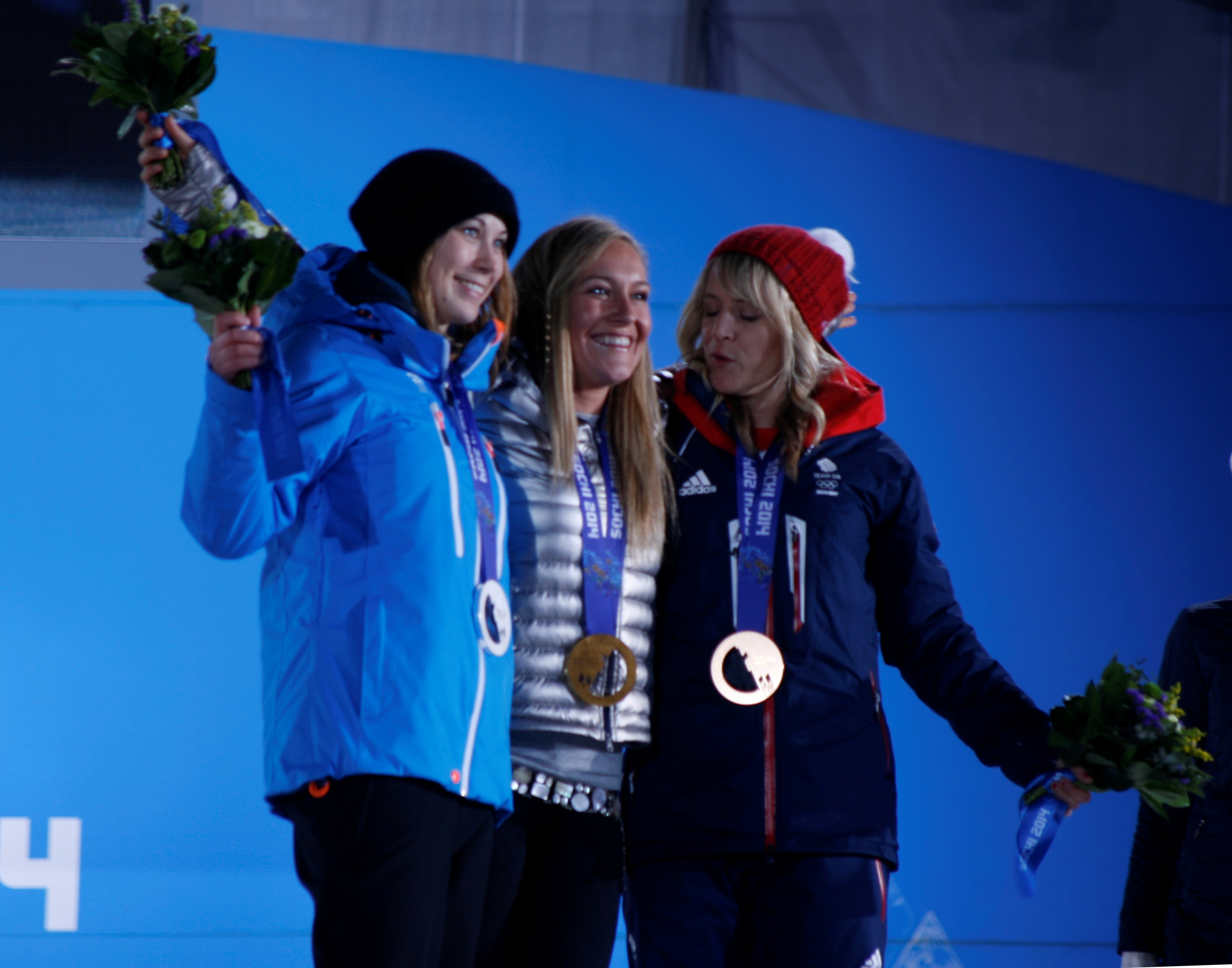
The medalists in women's slopestyle

Event	Gold	Silver	Bronze
parallel slalom	Julia Dujmovits; Austria	Anke Karstens; Germany	Amelie Kober; Germany
parallel giant slalom	Patrizia Kummer; Switzerland	Tomoka Takeuchi; Japan	Alena Zavarzina; Russia
halfpipe	Kaitlyn Farrington; United States	Torah Bright; Australia	Kelly Clark; United States
slopestyle	Jamie Anderson; United States	Enni Rukajärvi; Finland	Jenny Jones; Great Britain
snowboard cross	Eva Samkova; Czech Republic	Dominique Maltais; Canada	Chloé Trespeuch; France

== Speed skating ==
=== Men's events ===
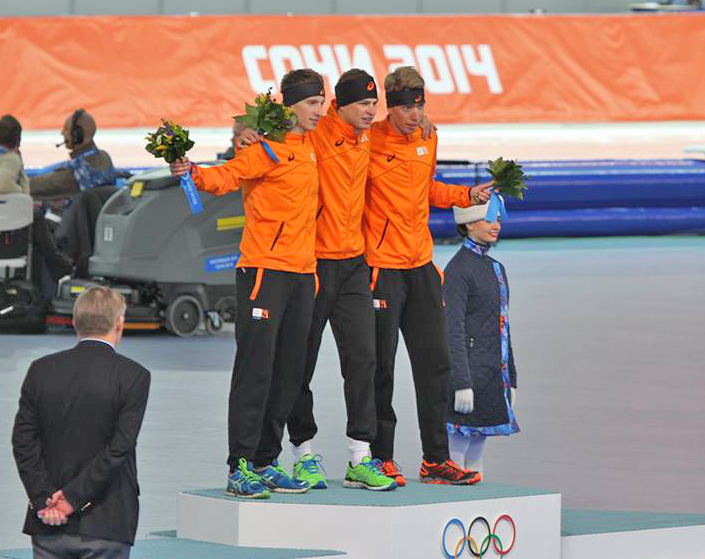
The medalists in men's 5000 m speed skating

Event	Gold	Silver	Bronze
500 metres	Michel Mulder; Netherlands	Jan Smeekens; Netherlands	Ronald Mulder; Netherlands
1000 metres	Stefan Groothuis; Netherlands	Denny Morrison; Canada	Michel Mulder; Netherlands
1500 metres	Zbigniew Bródka; Poland	Koen Verweij; Netherlands	Denny Morrison; Canada
5000 metres	Sven Kramer; Netherlands	Jan Blokhuijsen; Netherlands	Jorrit Bergsma; Netherlands
10000 metres	Jorrit Bergsma; Netherlands	Sven Kramer; Netherlands	Bob de Jong; Netherlands
Team pursuit	Netherlands; Jan Blokhuijsen; Sven Kramer; Koen Verweij	South Korea; Joo Hyong-jun; Kim Cheol-min; Lee Seung-hoon	Poland; Zbigniew Bródka; Konrad Niedźwiedzki; Jan Szymański

=== Women's events ===
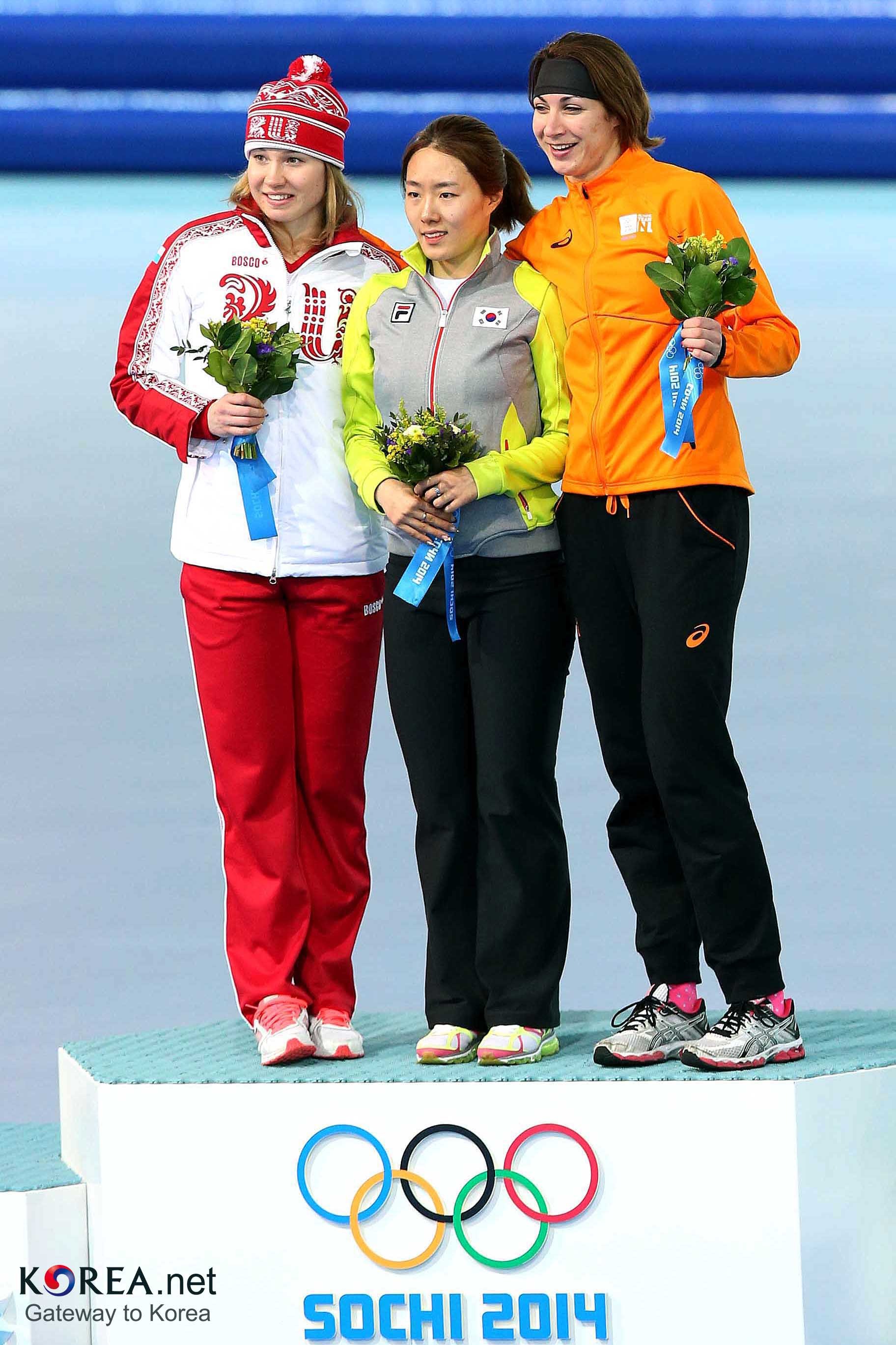
The medalists in 500 m ladies' speed skating. Silver medalist Olga Fatkulina of Russia was subsequently stripped of the silver medal on 24 November 2017 by IOC, but CAS returned the medal to her on 1 Feb 2018.

Event	Gold	Silver	Bronze
500 metres	Lee Sang-hwa; South Korea	Olga Fatkulina; Russia	Margot Boer; Netherlands
1000 metres	Zhang Hong; China	Ireen Wüst; Netherlands	Margot Boer; Netherlands
1500 metres	Jorien ter Mors; Netherlands	Ireen Wüst; Netherlands	Lotte van Beek; Netherlands
3000 metres	Ireen Wüst; Netherlands	Martina Sáblíková; Czech Republic	Olga Graf; Russia
5000 metres	Martina Sáblíková; Czech Republic	Ireen Wüst; Netherlands	Carien Kleibeuker; Netherlands
Team pursuit	Netherlands; Jorien ter Mors; Marrit Leenstra; Ireen Wüst; Lotte van Beek	Poland; Katarzyna Bachleda-Curuś; Natalia Czerwonka; Luiza Złotkowska; Katarzyna Woźniak	Russia; Olga Graf; Yekaterina Lobysheva; Yuliya Skokova; Yekaterina Shikhova

== See also ==
- 2014 Winter Olympics medal table
- List of 2014 Winter Paralympics medal winners
