= Great Britain at the 2014 Winter Olympics =

- Flag of the United Kingdom
- IOC code: GBR
- NOC: British Olympic Association

in Sochi
- Competitors: 56 in 10 sports
- Flag bearers: Jon Eley (opening); Lizzy Yarnold (closing)
- Medals Ranked 19th: Gold 1 Silver 1 Bronze 3 Total 5

Winter Olympics appearances (overview)
- 1924; 1928; 1932; 1936; 1948; 1952; 1956; 1960; 1964; 1968; 1972; 1976; 1980; 1984; 1988; 1992; 1994; 1998; 2002; 2006; 2010; 2014; 2018; 2022; 2026

Great Britain, represented by the British Olympic Association (BOA), competed at the 2014 Winter Olympics in Sochi, Russia, from 7 to 23 February 2014. The British team was made up of athletes from the whole United Kingdom including Northern Ireland, whose athletes may have elected to hold Irish citizenship, allowing them to represent either Great Britain or Ireland. Additionally some British overseas territories competed separately from Britain in Olympic competition. A total of 56 athletes competed in 11 sports making it the biggest contingent that Great Britain had sent to a Winter Olympic Games for twenty-six years.

On 9 February 2014, Jenny Jones won Great Britain's first medal on snow in their Winter Olympic history after finishing third in the women's slopestyle.

On 14 February 2014, Lizzy Yarnold won gold in the skeleton. She became the second Briton to win the gold in the event, taking the title from previous Great Britain champion Amy Williams. She was elected to be the flag bearer for the closing ceremony.

On 20 February 2014, the women's curling team won their bronze medal match against Switzerland 6–5. In doing so, they ensured that Great Britain met its UK Sport medal target of three medals from the Games.

On 19 February 2014, the men's curling team won their semifinal against Sweden 6–5 and on 21 February 2014, they won the silver medal after being defeated by Canada in the gold medal match 9–3, but the result still confirmed Great Britain's most successful Olympics for ninety years by equaling the medal count of the 1924 Winter Olympics.

In November 2017, the Russian Bobsleigh teams that came first and fourth in the Four-man event were disqualified. This meant that Great Britain (who originally finished 5th) would move up into the bronze medal position. The IOC requested that the IBSF modify the results, and the medals were redistributed accordingly.

== Records ==
=== Olympic records ===
On 11 February Great Britain matched an Olympic scoreline record by beating USA 12–3 in women's curling. They also set a new Olympic record by scoring seven points in a single end. On 14 February they equalled the scoreline record again, this time beating Japan 12–3.

== Medallists ==
Medals by date
Day	Date	1st place, gold medalist(s)	2nd place, silver medalist(s)	3rd place, bronze medalist(s)	Total
Day 1	8 February	0	0	0	0
Day 2	9 February	0	0	1	1
Day 3	10 February	0	0	0	0
Day 4	11 February	0	0	0	0
Day 5	12 February	0	0	0	0
Day 6	13 February	0	0	0	0
Day 7	14 February	1	0	0	1
Day 8	15 February	0	0	0	0
Day 9	16 February	0	0	0	0
Day 10	17 February	0	0	0	0
Day 11	18 February	0	0	0	0
Day 12	19 February	0	0	0	0
Day 13	20 February	0	0	1	1
Day 14	21 February	0	1	0	1
Day 15	22 February	0	0	0	0
Day 16	23 February	0	0	1	1
Total		1	1	3	5

Medal	Name	Sport	Event	Date
Gold	Lizzy Yarnold	Skeleton	Women's	14 February
Silver	David Murdoch; Greg Drummond; Scott Andrews; Michael Goodfellow; Tom Brewster	Curling	Men's curling	21 February
Bronze	Jenny Jones	Snowboarding	Women's slopestyle	9 February
Bronze	Eve Muirhead; Anna Sloan; Vicki Adams; Claire Hamilton; Lauren Gray	Curling	Women's curling	20 February
Bronze	John Jackson; Bruce Tasker; Stuart Benson; Joel Fearon	Bobsleigh	Four Man	23 February

Medals by sport
Sport	1st place, gold medalist(s)	2nd place, silver medalist(s)	3rd place, bronze medalist(s)	Total
Skeleton	1	0	0	1
Curling	0	1	1	2
Snowboarding	0	0	1	1
Bobsleigh	0	0	1	1
Total	1	1	3	5

== Medal and performance targets ==
On 16 January 2014, the funding body UK Sport announced their medal targets for Team GB at the 2014 Winter Olympic Games in Sochi with the target to win three medals with the best chance of success with the ladies skeleton events. Although the target was set at three medals the funding body predicted that Great Britain had the potential to win as many as seven medals, although this total was not widely expected to be reached. Other realistic chances of medal success were with the bobsleigh and curling events.

The games proved to be highly successful for Team GB, exceeding the initial target of three medals and achieving all of the targets for each of the winter sports that were set.

Key	✗ Target missed	✓ Target met

Sport	Medal target set	Non medal target	Medals or result	Performance relative to target range
Bobsleigh	0–1	4th–6th (m), 4th–8th (w)	1	✓
Curling	1–2		2	✓
Figure skating	0	Top ten	Tenth	✓
Skeleton	1		1	✓
Speed skating	0–1	2x top eight	4 x top eight	✓
Ski and snowboard	1–2		1	✓
Total	3–7	n/a	5	✓
Total gold	n/a	n/a	1	n/a

=== UK Sport funding ===
In the Winter Olympic Cycle running from 2010 to 2014 the UK government body UK Sport allocated a then record budget of over £13 million to fund Team GB for the individual athletes as well as the bobsleigh and curling teams for the 2014 Winter Olympics in Sochi. The sports receiving the highest funding were bobsleigh, curling and skeleton, whilst speed skating, ski and snowboard, and figure skating also received funding, but all other winter sports where British athletes were competing did not receive any funding from the body.

Sport	Funding
Bobsleigh	£3,304,250
Curling	£2,055,100
Figure skating	£174,338
Speed skating	£2,593,400
Skeleton	£3,447,600
Ski and snowboard	£1,509,950
Total	£13,444,638

== Alpine skiing ==
According to the quota allocation released on 27 January 2014, Great Britain qualified two athletes in alpine skiing.

Athlete	Event	Run 1		Run 2		Total	
Athlete	Event	Time	Rank	Time	Rank	Time	Rank
David Ryding	Men's slalom	49.40	27	56.51	18	1:45.91	18
Chemmy Alcott	Women's downhill	—N/a				1:43.43	19
Chemmy Alcott	Women's super-G	—N/a				1:29.14	23
Chemmy Alcott	Women's combined	1:44.83	16	DNF			

== Biathlon ==
Based on their performance at the 2012 and 2013 Biathlon World Championships, Great Britain qualified 1 man and 1 woman.

Athlete	Event	Time	Misses	Rank
Lee-Steve Jackson	Men's sprint	27:07.5	1 (0+1)	67
Lee-Steve Jackson	Men's individual	54:11.3	1 (0+0+0+1)	42
Amanda Lightfoot	Women's sprint	24:48.9	3 (2+1)	75
Amanda Lightfoot	Women's individual	54:38.1	5 (1+2+1+1)	71

== Bobsleigh ==
Athlete	Event	Run 1		Run 2		Run 3		Run 4		Total	
Athlete	Event	Time	Rank	Time	Rank	Time	Rank	Time	Rank	Time	Rank
John Baines**; Lamin Deen*	Two-man	57.54	=21	57.81	25	57.38	=18	Did not advance		2:52.73	23
Stuart Benson; Joel Fearon; John Jackson*; Bruce Tasker	Four-man	55.26	10	55.27	2	55.31	5	55.26	2	3:41.10	(bronze) ^{α}
John Baines; Lamin Deen*; Andrew Matthews***; Ben Simons	Four-man	55.91	19	55.60	16	56.06	=19	55.95	20	3:43.52	19
Paula Walker*; Rebekah Wilson	Two-woman	58.36	12	58.40	10	58.88	14	58.60	10	3:54.24	12

* – Denotes the driver of each sled
** – John Baines replaced original selection Craig Pickering who withdrew during the Games with a back injury.
*** – Andrew Matthews replaced original selection Craig Pickering who withdrew during the Games with a back injury.
^α In November 2017, the Russian teams that finished 1st and 4th were disqualified by the IOC following the publication of the McLaren Report. This subsequently led to the teams in 2nd, 3rd and 5th being moved up into the medal positions. The IOC requested that the IBSF modify the results, and the medals were redistributed accordingly.

== Cross-country skiing ==
According to the quota allocation released on 30 December 2013, Great Britain had four athletes in qualification position.

Distance

Athlete	Event	Classical		Freestyle		Final		
Athlete	Event	Time	Rank	Time	Rank	Time	Deficit	Rank
Andrew Musgrave	Men's 15 km classical	—N/a				42:25.7	+3:56.0	44
Callum Smith	Men's 15 km classical	—N/a				44:14.7	+5:45.0	67
Andrew Young	Men's 15 km classical	—N/a				41:29.6	+2:59.9	37
Callum Smith	Men's 30 km skiathlon	39:57.4	59	37:02.5	64	1:17:37.1	+9:21.7	62
Andrew Musgrave	Men's 50 km freestyle	—N/a				1:57:08.9	+10:13.7	53
Rosamund Musgrave	Women's 10 km classical	—N/a				36:18.5	+8:00.7	63

Sprint

Athlete	Event	Qualification		Quarterfinal		Semifinal		Final	
Athlete	Event	Time	Rank	Time	Rank	Time	Rank	Time	Rank
Andrew Musgrave	Men's sprint	3:37.75	27 Q	3:48.69	6	Did not advance			
Callum Smith	Men's sprint	3:50.13	62	Did not advance					
Andrew Young	Men's sprint	3:40.68	42	Did not advance					
Andrew Musgrave; Andrew Young	Men's team sprint	—N/a				DNF		Did not advance	
Rosamund Musgrave	Women's sprint	2:43.31	42	Did not advance					

== Curling ==
Based on results from 2012 and the 2013, Great Britain has qualified their men's and women's team (consisting of five athletes) as one of the seven highest ranked nations.

=== Men's tournament ===
Team

Position	Curler
Skip	David Murdoch
Third	Greg Drummond
Second	Scott Andrews
Lead	Michael Goodfellow
Alternate	Tom Brewster

==== Standings ====
Final round robin standings
Team	Skip	Pld	W	L	PF	PA	EW	EL	BE	SE	S%	Qualification
Sweden	Niklas Edin	9	8	1	60	44	38	30	18	8	86%	Playoffs
Canada	Brad Jacobs	9	7	2	69	53	39	36	14	7	84%	Playoffs
China	Liu Rui	9	7	2	67	50	41	37	11	5	85%	Playoffs
Norway	Thomas Ulsrud	9	5	4	52	53	36	33	18	5	86%	Tiebreaker
Great Britain	David Murdoch	9	5	4	51	49	37	35	15	8	83%	Tiebreaker
Denmark	Rasmus Stjerne	9	4	5	54	61	32	37	17	4	81%	
Russia	Andrey Drozdov	9	3	6	58	70	36	38	13	7	77%	
Switzerland	Sven Michel	9	3	6	47	46	31	34	22	7	83%	
United States	John Shuster	9	2	7	47	58	30	39	14	7	80%	
Germany	John Jahr	9	1	8	53	74	38	39	10	9	76%	

==== Round-robin ====
Great Britain had a bye in draws 4, 7 and 11.

Draw 1

Sheet A	1	2	3	4	5	6	7	8	9	10	Final
Russia (Drozdov)	0	0	0	0	1	0	1	0	2	X	4
Great Britain (Murdoch) 🔨	0	2	0	0	0	4	0	1	0	X	7

Draw 2

Sheet D	1	2	3	4	5	6	7	8	9	10	Final
Sweden (Edin)	0	2	0	0	2	0	0	4	0	X	8
Great Britain (Murdoch) 🔨	1	0	0	1	0	0	1	0	1	X	4

Draw 3

Sheet C	1	2	3	4	5	6	7	8	9	10	Final
Great Britain (Murdoch) 🔨	1	0	0	0	2	0	2	0	1	1	7
Germany (Jahr)	0	1	1	1	0	2	0	1	0	0	6

Draw 5

Sheet B	1	2	3	4	5	6	7	8	9	10	Final
Switzerland (Michel)	0	0	0	0	1	0	0	1	0	0	2
Great Britain (Murdoch) 🔨	0	0	1	1	0	1	0	0	0	1	4

Draw 6

Sheet D	1	2	3	4	5	6	7	8	9	10	Final
Great Britain (Murdoch)	1	0	2	0	1	0	0	1	0	X	5
United States (Shuster) 🔨	0	0	0	1	0	0	1	0	1	X	3

Draw 8

Sheet A	1	2	3	4	5	6	7	8	9	10	Final
Great Britain (Murdoch)	0	0	0	1	0	3	0	2	1	1	8
Denmark (Stjerne) 🔨	0	2	1	0	2	0	1	0	0	0	6

Draw 9

Sheet C	1	2	3	4	5	6	7	8	9	10	Final
Canada (Jacobs) 🔨	1	0	0	3	0	0	1	0	1	1	7
Great Britain (Murdoch)	0	1	1	0	2	0	0	1	0	0	5

Draw 10

Sheet B	1	2	3	4	5	6	7	8	9	10	Final
Great Britain (Murdoch) 🔨	0	2	0	1	0	0	1	0	2	0	6
Norway (Ulsrud)	0	0	2	0	2	1	0	1	0	1	7

Draw 12

Sheet A	1	2	3	4	5	6	7	8	9	10	Final
China (Liu) 🔨	1	0	0	2	0	0	1	1	0	1	6
Great Britain (Murdoch)	0	1	1	0	0	1	0	0	2	0	5

==== Tiebreaker ====
Sheet C	1	2	3	4	5	6	7	8	9	10	Final
Norway (Ulsrud) 🔨	1	0	1	0	2	0	0	0	1	0	5
Great Britain (Murdoch)	0	1	0	1	0	0	0	2	0	2	6

==== Playoffs ====
Semifinal

Sheet B	1	2	3	4	5	6	7	8	9	10	Final
Sweden (Edin) 🔨	0	0	2	0	0	0	1	0	2	0	5
Great Britain (Murdoch)	0	1	0	0	1	1	0	1	0	2	6

Final

Sheet C	1	2	3	4	5	6	7	8	9	10	Final
Canada (Jacobs) 🔨	2	0	3	1	0	2	0	1	X	X	9
Great Britain (Murdoch)	0	1	0	0	1	0	1	0	X	X	3

=== Women's tournament ===
Team

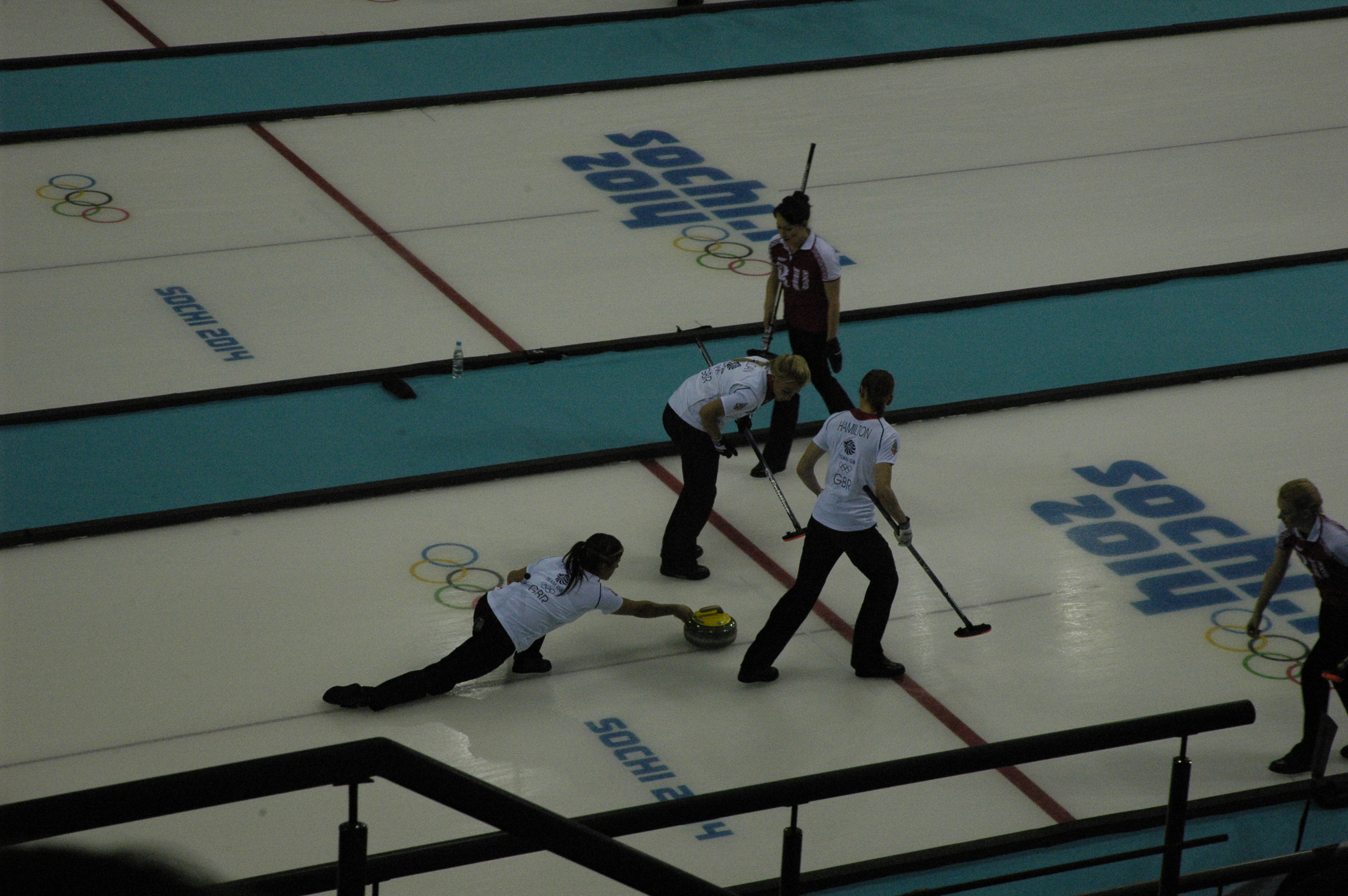
British women's curling team

Position	Curler
Skip	Eve Muirhead
Third	Anna Sloan
Second	Vicki Adams
Lead	Claire Hamilton
Alternate	Lauren Gray

==== Standings ====
Final round robin standings
Team	Skip	Pld	W	L	PF	PA	EW	EL	BE	SE	S%	Qualification
Canada	Jennifer Jones	9	9	0	72	40	43	27	12	14	86%	Playoffs
Sweden	Margaretha Sigfridsson	9	7	2	58	52	37	35	13	7	80%	Playoffs
Switzerland	Mirjam Ott	9	5	4	63	60	37	38	13	7	78%	Playoffs
Great Britain	Eve Muirhead	9	5	4	74	58	39	35	9	11	80%	Playoffs
Japan	Ayumi Ogasawara	9	4	5	59	67	39	41	4	10	76%	
Denmark	Lene Nielsen	9	4	5	57	56	34	40	12	9	78%	
China	Wang Bingyu	9	4	5	58	62	36	38	10	4	81%	
South Korea	Kim Ji-sun	9	3	6	60	65	35	37	10	6	79%	
Russia	Anna Sidorova	9	3	6	48	56	33	35	19	6	82%	
United States	Erika Brown	9	1	8	42	75	33	40	8	5	76%	

==== Round-robin ====
Great Britain has a bye in draws 2, 6 and 10.

Draw 1

Sheet C	1	2	3	4	5	6	7	8	9	10	Final
Sweden (Sigfridsson)	0	1	2	0	0	0	2	0	1	X	6
Great Britain (Muirhead) 🔨	0	0	0	1	1	1	0	1	0	X	4

Draw 3

Sheet A	1	2	3	4	5	6	7	8	9	10	Final
Great Britain (Muirhead)	1	1	0	7	0	3	X	X	X	X	12
United States (Brown) 🔨	0	0	1	0	2	0	X	X	X	X	3

Draw 4

Sheet D	1	2	3	4	5	6	7	8	9	10	Final
Canada (Jones)	1	0	2	0	3	0	1	0	1	1	9
Great Britain (Muirhead) 🔨	0	1	0	2	0	2	0	1	0	0	6

Draw 5

Sheet C	1	2	3	4	5	6	7	8	9	10	Final
China (Wang) 🔨	2	0	1	0	1	0	1	0	2	0	7
Great Britain (Muirhead)	0	2	0	2	0	2	0	1	0	1	8

Draw 7

Sheet B	1	2	3	4	5	6	7	8	9	10	Final
Great Britain (Muirhead) 🔨	2	0	2	1	0	2	5	X	X	X	12
Japan (Ogasawara)	0	2	0	0	1	0	0	X	X	X	3

Draw 8

Sheet D	1	2	3	4	5	6	7	8	9	10	Final
Great Britain (Muirhead)	0	3	0	1	1	0	2	0	0	3	10
South Korea (Kim) 🔨	2	0	0	0	0	2	0	2	2	0	8

Draw 9

Sheet C	1	2	3	4	5	6	7	8	9	10	Final
Great Britain (Muirhead)	1	0	0	0	1	0	2	0	2	0	6
Switzerland (Ott) 🔨	0	2	1	0	0	3	0	1	0	1	8

Draw 11

Sheet A	1	2	3	4	5	6	7	8	9	10	Final
Russia (Sidorova)	0	0	2	0	0	1	0	0	3	0	6
Great Britain (Muirhead) 🔨	0	1	0	2	0	0	0	4	0	2	9

Draw 12

Sheet B	1	2	3	4	5	6	7	8	9	10	11	Final
Denmark (Nielsen)	2	0	0	0	0	2	0	0	0	3	1	8
Great Britain (Muirhead) 🔨	0	0	1	2	0	0	3	1	0	0	0	7

==== Playoffs ====
Semifinal

Team	1	2	3	4	5	6	7	8	9	10	Final
Canada (Jones) 🔨	2	1	0	1	0	1	0	0	0	1	6
Great Britain (Muirhead)	0	0	2	0	1	0	0	0	1	0	4

Bronze medal game

Team	1	2	3	4	5	6	7	8	9	10	Final
Great Britain (Muirhead)	0	0	1	0	2	0	0	2	0	1	6
Switzerland (Ott) 🔨	0	2	0	1	0	1	0	0	1	0	5

== Figure skating ==
On 11 December 2013 the British Olympic Association announced the figure skaters taking part in the Sochi 2014 Olympics:

Athlete	Event	SP/OD		FS/FD		Total	
Athlete	Event	Points	Rank	Points	Rank	Points	Rank
Jenna McCorkell	Ladies' singles	48.34	25	Did not advance			
Stacey Kemp / David King	Pairs	44.98	19	Did not advance			
Nick Buckland / Penny Coomes	Ice dancing	59.33	11 Q	91.78	9	151.11	10

Team trophy

Athlete	Event	Short program/Short dance						Free skate/Free dance					
Athlete	Event	Men's	Ladies'	Pairs	Ice dance	Total		Men's	Ladies'	Pairs	Ice dance	Total	
Athlete	Event	Points Team points	Points Team points	Points Team points	Points Team points	Points	Rank	Points Team points	Points Team points	Points Team points	Points Team points	Points	Rank
Matthew Parr (M); Jenna McCorkell (L); David King / Stacey Kemp (P); Nick Buckland / Penny Coomes (I)	Team trophy	57.40; 2	50.09; 1	44.70; 1	52.93; 4	8	10	Did not advance					

== Freestyle skiing ==
After suffering injuries and a loss of consciousness as a result of an accident during training on 17 February, it was decided that Rowan Cheshire would not compete in the women's halfpipe event, which began just three days later.

Athlete	Event	Qualification				Final			
Athlete	Event	Run 1	Run 2	Best	Rank	Run 1	Run 2	Best	Rank
Murray Buchan	Men's halfpipe	58.40	62.40	62.40	17	Did not advance			
James Machon	Men's halfpipe	37.40	52.20	52.20	23	Did not advance			
James Woods	Men's slopestyle	87.20	40.00	87.20	3 Q	86.60	78.40	86.60	5
Rowan Cheshire	Women's halfpipe	Withdrew due to injury							
Emma Lonsdale	Women's halfpipe	53.80	53.20	53.80	18	Did not advance			
Katie Summerhayes	Women's slopestyle	81.40	84.00	84.00	3 Q	19.40	70.60	70.60	7

== Short track speed skating ==
Based on their performance at the two World Cup events in November 2013, Great Britain qualified 3 men and 2 women.

The team for GB was named on 16 December 2013.

Men

Athlete	Event	Heat		Quarterfinal		Semifinal		Final	
Athlete	Event	Time	Rank	Time	Rank	Time	Rank	Time	Rank
Jon Eley	500 m	41.554	2 Q	41.337	2 Q	41.411	4 FB	41.870	7
Jon Eley	1000 m	1:25.748	4	Did not advance					25
Richard Shoebridge	1000 m	1:27.806	4	Did not advance					27
Jack Whelbourne	500 m	42.513	4	Did not advance					27
Jack Whelbourne	1000 m	1:26.086	3	Did not advance					21
Jack Whelbourne	1500 m	2:14.091	1 Q	—N/a		2:14.635	2 Q	DNF	7

Women

Athlete	Event	Heat		Quarterfinal		Semifinal		Final	
Athlete	Event	Time	Rank	Time	Rank	Time	Rank	Time	Rank
Elise Christie	500 m	44.775	1 Q	43.402	2 Q	43.837	1 Q	PEN	8 (Note: Elise Christie finished 2nd in the final, but was disqualified after colliding with fellow competitors, the disqualification led her to finishing 8th in the 500 m.)
Elise Christie	1000 m	1:30.588	1 Q	1:30.606	1 Q	PEN		Did not advance	7
Elise Christie	1500 m	DNF		—N/a		Did not advance			
Charlotte Gilmartin	500 m	44.440	2 Q	44.479	4	Did not advance			16
Charlotte Gilmartin	1500 m	2:27.935	5	—N/a		Did not advance			28

Qualification legend: ADV – Advanced due to being impeded by another skater; FA – Qualify to medal round; FB – Qualify to consolation round

== Skeleton ==
Athlete	Event	Run 1		Run 2		Run 3		Run 4		Total	
Athlete	Event	Time	Rank	Time	Rank	Time	Rank	Time	Rank	Time	Rank
Kristan Bromley	Men's	57.24	10	57.02	=9	57.17	12	56.74	=7	3:48.17	8
Dominic Parsons	Men's	57.23	9	57.17	15	57.00	9	56.96	=10	3:48.36	10
Shelley Rudman	Women's	59.46	12	59.33	12	58.82	17	58.86	19	3:56.47	16
Lizzy Yarnold	Women's	58.43	1	58.46	1	57.91	1	58.09	1	3:52.89	1st place, gold medalist(s)

== Snowboarding ==
Freestyle

Athlete	Event	Qualification				Semifinal				Final			
Athlete	Event	Run 1	Run 2	Best	Rank	Run 1	Run 2	Best	Rank	Run 1	Run 2	Best	Rank
Dom Harington	Men's halfpipe	12.75	37.25	37.25	20	Did not advance							
Ben Kilner	Men's halfpipe	43.50	16.25	43.50	16	Did not advance							
Billy Morgan	Men's slopestyle	76.25	85.50	85.50	6 QS	90.75	35.50	90.75	1 QF	38.00	39.75	39.75	10
Jamie Nicholls	Men's slopestyle	62.25	86.75	86.75	4 QF	Bye				85.50	46.50	85.50	6
Aimee Fuller	Women's slopestyle	44.50	39.00	44.50	10 QS	33.75	37.50	37.50	9	Did not advance			
Jenny Jones	Women's slopestyle	74.25	21.75	74.25	5 QS	82.25	83.25	83.25	3 QF	73.00	87.25	87.25	3rd place, bronze medalist(s)

Qualification Legend: QF – Qualify directly to final; QS – Qualify to semifinal

Snowboard cross

Athlete	Event	Seeding		Quarterfinal	Semifinal	Final	
Athlete	Event	Time	Rank	Position	Position	Position	Rank
Zoe Gillings	Women's snowboard cross	1:23.78	14	3 Q	4 FB	3	9

Qualification legend: FA – Qualify to medal final; FB – Qualify to consolation final

== See also ==
- Great Britain at the 2014 Summer Youth Olympics
- Great Britain at the 2014 Winter Paralympics
