= John Jackson (bobsleigh) =

British bobsledder

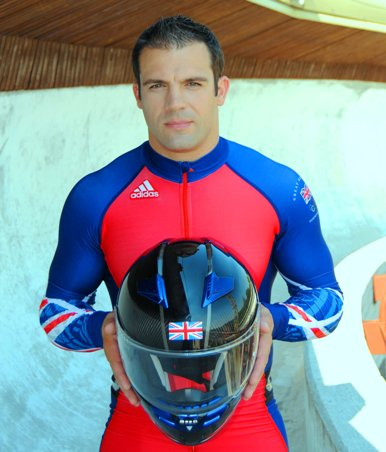

Personal information
- Full name: John James Jackson
- Nationality: British
- Born: 11 April 1977 (age 49) Bishop Auckland, Durham, England, United Kingdom
- Height: 1.83 m (6 ft 0 in)
- Weight: 106 kg (234 lb)
- Spouse: Paula Walker

Sport
- Country: United Kingdom
- Sport: Bobsleigh (pilot)
- Club: GB Team
Medal record
Men's Bobsleigh
Representing Great Britain
Olympic Games
Bronze medal – third place	2014 Sochi	Four man
European Championships
Silver medal – second place	2014 Königsee	Four-man
World Cup
Silver medal – second place	2013 Lake Placid	Four-Man
Europa Cup
Gold medal – first place	2011 St. Moritz	Two-man
Bronze medal – third place	2011 St. Moritz	Four-man
Bronze medal – third place	2011 St. Moritz	Four-man

John James Jackson (born 11 April 1977) is a former British bobsleigher and current Royal Marines commando.

== Career ==
Jackson took up bobsleighing at the age of 28. In September 2005 he trialled at the University of Bath and won a place in the Europa Cup team, later being selected to compete as driver. He made his world cup debut as a driver in 2007 and became British champion in 2008. In 2011 Jackson won gold and two bronze medals in the Europa Cup in St Moritz, the first British man ever to do so. Thereafter, Jackson became the main British driver.

In January 2014, with team-mates Joel Fearon, Stuart Benson and Bruce Tasker, Jackson won a silver medal in the four-man event at the Bobsleigh European Championship. He competed at the 2010 and 2014 Winter Olympics, guiding his crew to fifth place in the four-man event in 2014, 0.11 seconds off a bronze medal, after recovering from a ruptured Achilles tendon. In 2017, the British team were upgraded to the bronze medal position after two Russian crews were disqualified for doping violations. Jackson also competed at seven FIBT World Championships, finishing fifth in the four-man event in the 2013 Worlds at St. Moritz. He took a second place in the four-man competition at the Lake Placid round of the 2013–14 Bobsleigh World Cup, the first podium finish for a British crew for many years. Jackson announced his retirement from the sport in June 2016.

Jackson's wife Paula Jackson, who also served in the armed forces, was involved in bobsleigh until her retirement from the sport in 2015. In June 2014 the couple announced that they were expecting their first child together. Jackson has three daughters from a previous relationship.

== Military service ==
Jackson joined the Royal Marines in 1996. He is currently a Physical Training Instructor (PTI) and holds the rank of Colour Sergeant.

== Achievements ==
British Champion: 2008

World Championships:

- 9th in 2007 (4 man crew)
- 13th in 2008 (4 man crew)
- 22nd in 2009 (2 man crew)
- 17th in 2009 (4 man crew)
- 20th in 2011 (2 man crew)
- 10th in 2012 (4 man crew)
- 19th in 2013 (2 man crew)
- 5th in 2013 (4 man crew)

Winter Olympic Games:

- 3rd in 2014 (4 man crew)

John Jackson also achieved:

- 2006 Navy Novice Champion
- 2005 Army Novice Champion
- 2005 European Novice Push Championships: Bronze Medallist
