= Bruce Tasker =

British bobsledder

Personal information
- Nationality: British
- Born: 2 September 1987 (age 38) Lawrenny, Wales, United Kingdom
- Height: 1.93 m (6 ft 4 in)
- Weight: 115 kg (254 lb)
- Website: http://www.brucetasker.com/

Sport
- Country: United Kingdom
- Sport: Bobsleigh
- Club: GB Team
- Coached by: Chris Woolley; Dominik Scherrer; Peter Gunn; Michael Khmel
Medal record
Men's Bobsleigh
Representing Great Britain
Olympic Games
Bronze medal – third place	2014 Sochi	Four man

Bruce Tasker (born 2 September 1987) is a British former bobsledder and track athlete. He qualified for the 2014 Winter Olympics in the 4-man discipline.

== Life and career ==
Tasker was born in 1987 in Lawrenny, Wales. When young, Tasker was a talented athlete, which led to his joining the Carmarthen Harriers athletics club at the age of 11. Specialising in the 100m, 200m and 400m disciplines, he broke club records as a youth and won at both distances at several meets, including the Welsh Championship, where he won the 200m at Swansea in 2008, and the BUSA Championships, the 400m in Bedford in 2007. In 2006 he was ranked as the United Kingdom's top under-20s athlete in the indoor 400m. Despite this he failed to reach the top level of the sport and turned his back on sprinting in 2009.

Tasker first competed for Great Britain at a competition at Loughborough, in 2006. After graduating with upper second class honours, in 2008, Tasker changed events to focus on the 200m, but after winning only a U23 British bronze medal, his interest in athletics was waning.

In 2010, while studying for a degree in biochemistry at the University of Bath, he was introduced to bobsleigh by British racer John James Jackson. He adapted swiftly to the sport and was part of the four-man team that came first at the 2011–12 British Championships held at Winterberg. Tasker was also part of the four-man teams which represented Great Britain at the 2013 World Championships, coming in fifth and the 2014 Bobsleigh European Championships, winning a silver medal. He was also part of the four-man crew that finished second at the Lake Placid World Cup meeting in 2013.

On the 22 and 23 February 2014, Tasker represented Great Britain in the Winter Olympics in Sochi, Russia, in the four-man bobsleigh; racing in the first team along with Stuart Benson, Joel Fearon and pilot John James Jackson in GBR1. It was his debut Olympics. GBR1 finished in fifth position, but in 2017 two Russian crews were disqualified for doping violations, pushing the British crew up to bronze. After the Sochi Olympics Tasker undertook training to become a bobsleigh pilot in the summer of 2014.

In November 2017 at Park City, Tasker finished third in a four-man World Cup race alongside Bradley Hall, Joel Fearon and Greg Cackett.

On 4 January 2018, he suffered a stroke, ruling him out of taking part at the 2018 Winter Olympics.

After a career in which he competed at six World Championships and an Olympics, in October 2018 Tasker announced his retirement from competition.

In March 2020, he took part in BBC1 cooking show MasterChef.
