= Stuart Benson =

British bobsledder

Stuart Benson MBE
Personal information
- Born: 12 February 1981 (age 45) Glasgow, Scotland
- Years active: 2011–2014
- Height: 1.95 m (6 ft 5 in)
- Weight: 103 kg (227 lb)
- Spouse: Sarah Benson
- Website: www.stubenson.com

Sport
- Country: Great Britain
- Sport: Bobsleigh
- Event: Four-Man bobsleigh
- Club: GB Bobsleigh, Bath
- Coached by: Dominik Scherrer; Peter Gunn; Michael Khmel
Medal record
Men's Bobsleigh
Representing Great Britain
Olympic Games
Bronze medal – third place	2014 Sochi	Four man

Stuart Benson MBE (born 12 February 1981) is a former bobsledder who competed for Team GB, and an avionics technician in the Royal Air Force. He competed at the 2014 Winter Olympics in Sochi in the four-man bobsleigh, competing with John James Jackson, Bruce Tasker, and Joel Fearon, where they finished fifth. With the disqualification of both Russian bobsleigh teams who finished ahead of them, they officially finished third.

== Biography ==
Benson was born on 12 February 1981 in Glasgow, Scotland. He grew up in Troon.

Benson is in the Royal Air Force, working as an avionics technician since the age of 20. He currently holds the rank of Chief Technician. Whilst in the RAF, Benson competed with the RAF Athletics Team in the long jump and triple jump. Benson moved into sprinting, running in the fastest Scottish relay team for 16 years; and competing in the Crystal Palace Diamond League. However, the relay was not fast enough to qualify for the 2010 Delhi Commonwealth Games. This led him to try out at a bobsleigh "talent identification" event in 2011, where he was discovered in bobsleigh. This led to his becoming part of the GBR1 bobsleigh team; at the end of summer 2011 he was selected into the four-man GBR1 team.

In 2011 Benson won the Royal Air Force Sportsman of the Year, mainly for his track sport achievements.

Benson is married to Sarah Benson, who is a long-distance runner.

In 2013 the four-man bobsleigh team won a silver medal at the European Championships.

=== Olympics ===
Benson's debut Olympics are set to be the 2014 Winter Olympics in Sochi, and he was given special dispensation for time off from the RAF to attend. Competition there for the four-man bobsleigh event began on 22 February 2014. The British Olympic Association had qualified the GBR1 four-man bobsleigh team as on the "podium programme", i.e. that they have a chance of winning a medal. Benson competed with John James Jackson, Bruce Tasker, and Joel Fearon; of whom only Jackson was experienced; Tasker, Fearon and Benson were all comparatively new to the sport. The team finished fifth in the event, 0.11 seconds away from a medal. However, two teams that finished ahead of GBR1 were later disqualified as part of the Oswald Commission investigation. The Court of Arbitration for Sport upheld the ruling in February 2018.
