= Joel Fearon =

British-Jamaican sprinter and bobsledder

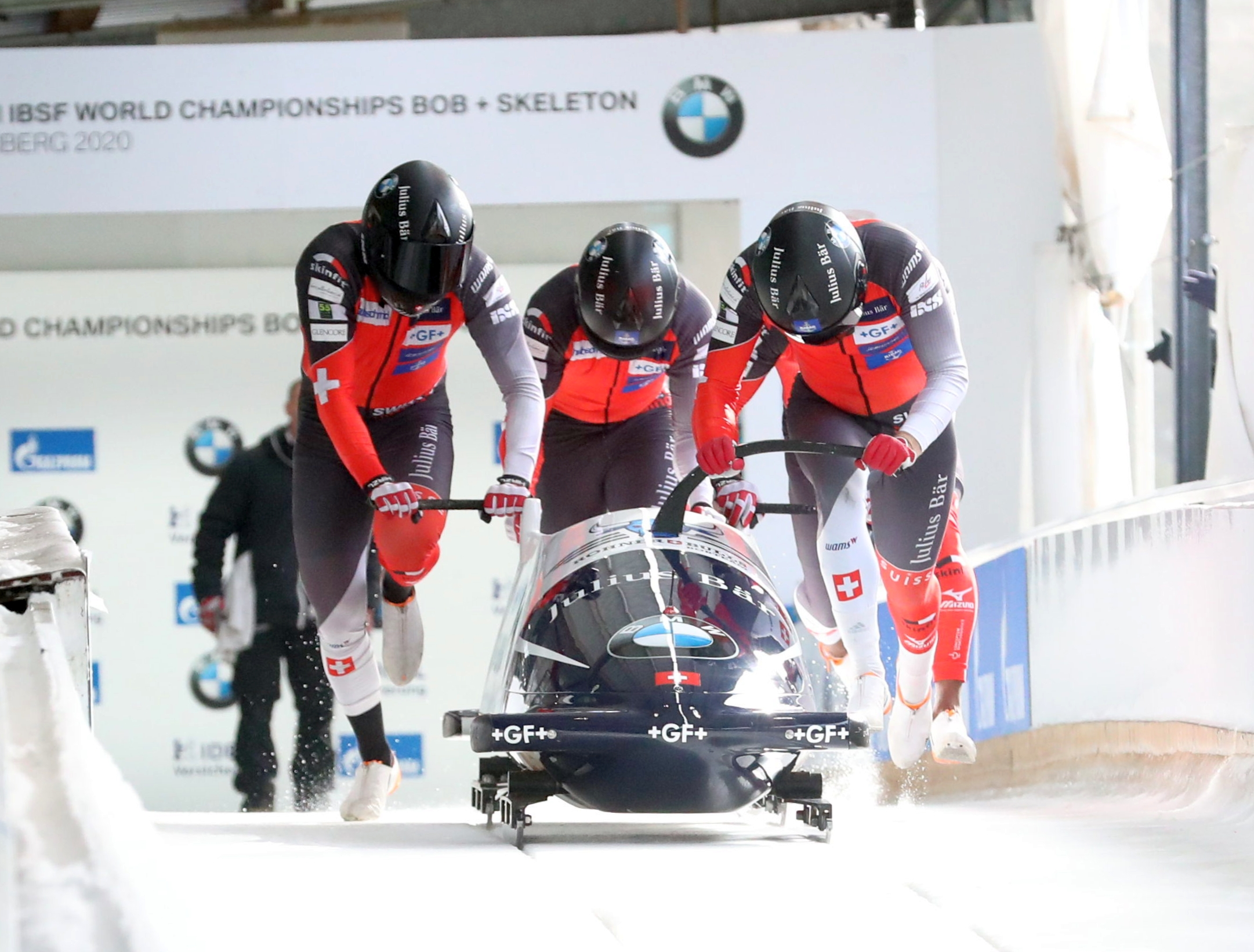

Personal information
- Nationality: British
- Born: 11 October 1988 (age 38) Coventry, England
- Height: 1.80 m (5 ft 11 in)
- Weight: 90 kg (198 lb)

Sport
- Country: United Kingdom
- Sport: Bobsleigh
- Club: GB Team
- Coached by: Michael Khmel
Medal record
Men's bobsleigh
Representing Great Britain
Olympic Games
Bronze medal – third place	2014 Sochi	Four man

Joel Fearon (born 11 October 1988) is a British and Jamaican sprinter and bobsledder. He represents the Birchfield Harriers and he is recognisable in the National Trials for wearing a black vest and lycra shorts. His coach is Michael Khmel, who also coached British Sprinter Craig Pickering. His personal best for the 100m, 9.96 seconds, places him 6th on the UK all-time list.

== Career ==
In addition to pursuing a sprinting career, Fearon has also competed in bobsleigh since November 2011, and was part of the Great Britain crews that finished fifth in the four man event at the FIBT World Championships in February 2013, and second at the Bobsleigh European Championship in January 2014. His team originally finished fifth in the Sochi Winter Olympics, but were subsequently upgraded to bronze medal position after two Russian crews were disqualified for doping violations.

In October 2019, it was reported that Fearon would compete for Switzerland during the 2019-2020 bobsled season on a year long "loan". He would go on to win a bronze medal at the Europe Cup in Königssee, Germany in December 2019.

In June 2021, following an anti-doping violation by Russia's Alexander Kasjanov, Fearon's quartet was upgraded to bronze medallists from the World Cup race in Lake Placid in January 2016.

Fearon will compete in the 2026 Winter Olympics for Jamaica, having come out of retirement after originally joining the Jamaica national bobsleigh team as a performance coach. He will be pushing in both the two- and four-man sleds, with driver Shane Pitter.

== Personal life ==
Fearon is of Jamaican descent through his father.

Event	Personal Best	UK ranking
60m	6.63 secs	2nd in 2011
100m	9.96 secs	1st in 2016
200m	21.4 secs	12th in 2009 (U23)
