= Mount Snow =

Ski resort in Vermont, United States

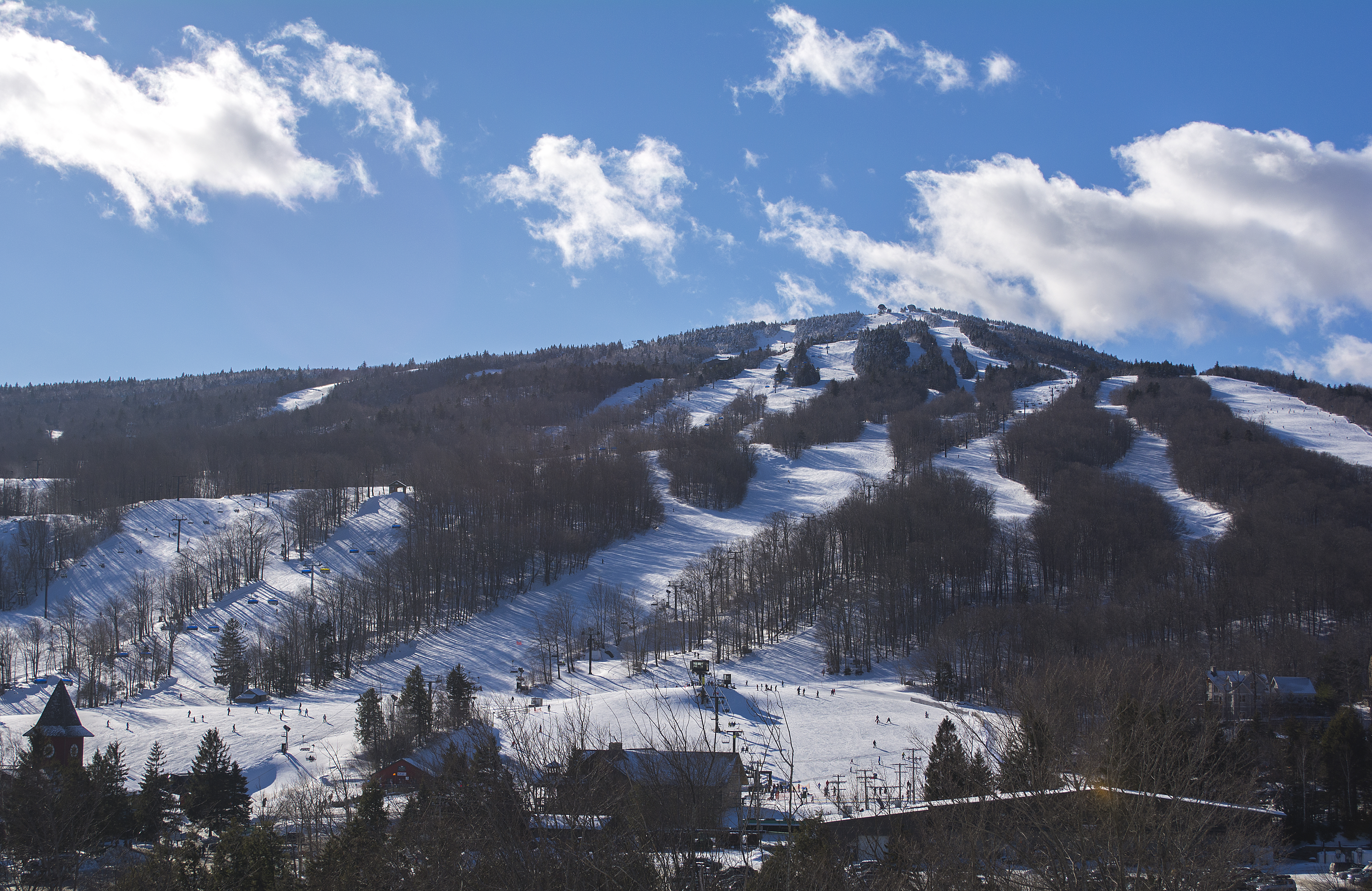
- Winter view of Mount Snow.
- Interactive map of Mount Snow
- Location: Dover, Windham County, Vermont, USA
- Coordinates: 42.959°N 72.922°W
- Status: Operating
- Owner: Vail Resorts
- Top elevation: 3,600 ft (1,100 m)
- Base elevation: 1,900 ft (580 m)
- Skiable area: 601 acres (243 ha)
- Trails: 86
- Longest run: Long John (3.1 miles (5.0 km))
- Lift system: 19 lifts
- Terrain parks: 10
- Snowfall: 150 inches (380 cm)
- Snowmaking: 83%
- Night skiing: No, only tubing
- Website: www.mountsnow.com

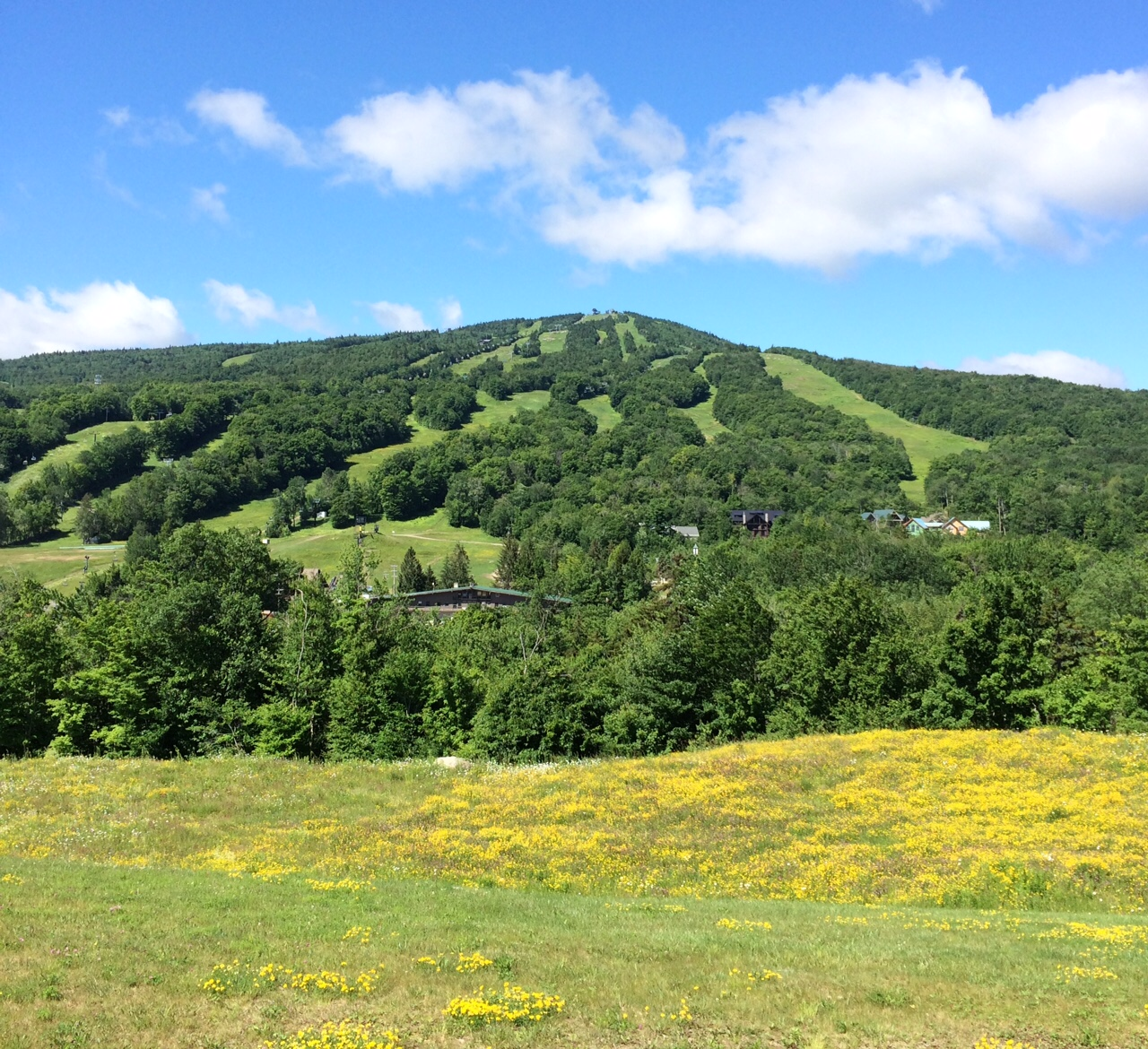
Mount Snow summer

Mount Snow (previously known as Mount Pisgah) is a mountain and ski resort in southern Vermont located in the Green Mountains. It is Vermont's southernmost big mountain, and therefore, closest to many Northeast metropolitan areas.

In September 2019, Mount Snow joined Vail Resorts' portfolio of 37 resorts and its Epic Pass, along with all other 16 resorts owned by Peak Resorts

Mount Snow is home to Carinthia Parks, which debuted in the 2008–2009 season. Carinthia is home to ten terrain parks, with both natural and man-made features and a superpipe. Mount Snow was co-host of the first Extreme Games in 1995 and host of the X Games in 2000 and 2001. Carinthia at Mount Snow claimed home to the second stop of the first annual winter Dew Tour as well as many other events including the Freeski Open and Carinthia Classic.

In the summer of 2011, Mount Snow installed a brand new Leitner-Poma high-speed detachable six-pack bubble chair. This lift transports skiers to the top of the mountain in seven minutes. The bubble shields skiers and riders from wind and snow and keeps them warm. If it is a warm skiing day riders can choose to leave the bubble up. As of 2022, Mount Snow has two high-speed detachable lifts from the base to the 3600-foot summit and a total of six high-speed detachable chairlifts, one leaving from the Carinthia Base Area, one leaving from the Sunbrook base area and four leaving from the Main Base Area.

== Statistics ==
Summit Elevation: 3,600 ft (1,100 m)

Vertical Drop: 1,700 ft (520 m)

Skiable area: 600 acres (2.4 km^{2})

Annual Average Snowfall: 158 inches

Trails: 86

Lifts: 18: 1 High-Speed Six-Pack Bubble, 1 High-Speed Six-Pack, 4 High-Speed Quads, 4 Triples, 2 Doubles, 5 Conveyors, 1 Rope Tow

Snowmaking: 83%

Total Snowguns: 917, of which 250 are fan guns. Mount Snow has the most fan guns of any resort in North America.

Terrain Park Acres: 100

Gladed Tree Acreage: 124

Tubing: Yes

Night Skiing: No

== History ==
Entrepreneur Walt Schoenknecht, who ran the Mohawk Mountain Ski Area in Connecticut, visited Vermont in 1946 in search of an area to open a new ski resort. He climbed to the summit of Mount Pisgah, a Southern Vermont peak originally named after the Biblical Mount Pisgah. Despite Schoenknecht's hike being in October, the mountain had over a foot of snow. Schoenknecht, who wanted an area with more snowfall than further south but still accessible to New England's metropolitan areas, and with varying terrain over different faces, saw Mount Pisgah as perfect. In 1953, he purchased land at the foot of Mount Pisgah owned by a farmer named Reuben Snow, who would become the namesake for Schoenknecht's ski area and later the government-recognized name for the peak.

In December 1954, Mount Snow opened to the public with five trails on the lower portion of the mountain, serviced by a rope tow and two double chairlifts. The lifts, named Little Beaver and Exhibition (later renamed to Standard), were chain-driven conveyor lifts built by Ramsey. Their unique design allowed them to carry significantly more skiers uphill than other ski lifts of traditional design. A total of six of these lifts were constructed over Mount Snow's first five seasons. Along with the original two were Summit (1955), Mixing Bowl (1956), Sap Bucket (1957), and South Bowl (1958). The last of these lifts to be removed was Mixing Bowl in 1997.

Complaints over the chain lifts being loud and occasionally dripping grease on riders led to the mountain beginning construction of traditionally designed chairlifts, beginning with the Beaver and Sundance doubles, built by Carlevaro & Savio in 1960. The Sundance chair came along with the opening of the Sundance base lodge. Around this time Mount Snow began advertising itself as "World's Largest, Most Exciting Ski Resort." Walt Shoenknecht, who once said, "a skier won't let you stand still...you must provide something new, something tremendously exciting every year to get him back," designed many unique and expensive features. This led to some referring to him as the "Walt Disney" of Vermont. Extravagant features included a Carlevaro & Savio tram from the nearby Snow Lake Lodge known as the Air Car, an outdoor heated pool, and a large fountain geyser in Snow Lake, which would form a small ski hill that would at times last past the end of the ski season.

For the 1959-1960 season, Mount Snow opened the North Face, an area of the mountain dedicated to expert terrain. The North Face double, a traditionally designed lift, opened in 1963 to service the area. The lift was later upgraded to a triple chair in 1987 and renamed to Outpost in the early 2000s.

In 1965, Mount Snow opened the G1, a Carlevaro & Savio double gondola. It was built as a skis-on gondola, closer to a bubble chair than a traditional gondola, due to Walt Schoenknecht not wanting to take his skis off due to back problems. A second gondola of the same design, the G2, was built for the 1969-1970 season.

In 1969, the Sunbrook area opened, a trail complex on the southern side of the mountain. It was serviced by a Carlevaro & Savio double chair named Sunbrook.

Financial struggles began to arise in the early 1970s due to low-snow seasons and increasing expenses. In 1971, Mount Snow merged with the Davos Corporation. Bankruptcy in 1975 led to a 1977 purchase by the Sherburne Corp., ran by the owner of Killington Ski Resort further north in Vermont. It was later rolled into S-K-I Ltd. (Sherburne-Killington-Investments) in 1984.

After the 1977 purchase, many features deemed unnecessary were removed, including the Air Car, pool, and fountain. By this time, Mount Snow had built only double chairlifts, including the Carlevaro & Savio Snowdance double (1961, later renamed to Standard) and the Canyon (1971) and Ski School (1972, later renamed to Lower Sundance and then Seasons) doubles, both built by Hall Ski-Lift, along with the previously mentioned chairs. In 1978, under new ownership, Mount Snow constructed the Summit Triple (later renamed to Summit Local), its first triple chair, built by Yan Lift. In the 1982-1983 season, Challenger, a Yan triple, was added to the North Face. Two years later, the Sundance, Little Beaver, and Beaver double chairs were replaced by the Sundance and Beaver Yan triple chairs. In 1985, the G2 gondola was replaced by another Yan triple, Ego Alley.

In 1986, Mount Snow purchased Carinthia, a directly adjacent ski area, and the trails were quickly connected. Carinthia opened in the 1960-1961 season, built by Walter Stugger, who named the area after the Austrian state of Carinthia. Carinthia had numerous land disputes with Mount Snow throughout its time as an independent area, and struggled to gain funding for projects due to its small size. At the time of the sale, Carinthia had two ski lifts and a rope tow. Ski Baba, a Borvig-built double chair, was built in 1979, and Carinthia, another double chair, was installed by Riblet in 1983. In 1987, Mount Snow replaced the rope tow with a Yan double chair named Fairway (later renamed to Old Ironsides for a short time and then to Heavy Metal).

In 1987, Mount Snow joined many of its competitors in installing a high-speed detachable chairlift, the Yankee Clipper quad, which was built by Yan. It replaced the aging G1 gondola lift.

The Sunbrook area was greatly expanded in 1990. The original Sunbrook double chair, which was renamed to Beartrap a few years before, received minor upgrades. CTEC (now under Doppelmayr USA) installed the Sunbrook quad chair to service the newly expanded terrain.

In 1991, Mount Snow began a three-year lease of the Haystack Mountain Ski Area, a ski area a short distance away. They later purchased the resort entirely in 1994 for $4.35 million. Plans to connect Mount Snow and Haystack with trails and lifts via the Deerfield Ridge never came into fruition. Haystack was sold in 2005 and closed to the public, becoming a private ski area under the name of the Hermitage Club.

Un Blanco Gulch, the first snowboard park in the east, opened in 1992 on Mount Snow's main base. The park featured jumps, a half-pipe, quarter hits, spines, wedges, banked turns, and a buried van. It was built by Tyler Doucette under the supervision of Chris Bluto. In the 2008-2009 season, all terrain parks on the mountain were moved to Carinthia, which became an area servicing only park trails, known as Carinthia Parks at Mount Snow. At Carinthia in 2000, Mount Snow hosted the 4th Annual Winter X-Games. The Games returned to Mount Snow the following year.

In 1996, LBO Resort Enterprises purchased Mount Snow along with numerous other ski areas and was renamed to the American Skiing Company. The same year, Mount Snow installed its second high-speed detachable lift, the Canyon Express quad, built by Poma. It replaced both the Standard and Canyon fixed-grip double chairs. Along with the new lift, Poma heavily modified the Yankee Clipper lift. Accidents involving Yan detachables had killed three people between Sierra-at-Tahoe and Whistler Blackcomb due to poor grip mechanisms, forcing resorts to either replace or retrofit their Yan detachable chairs.

In 1997, the Carinthia Riblet double was replaced by another Poma high-speed quad, the Nitro Express. The opening of the Grand Summit Hotel the same year led to the Beaver chair being relocated as Tumbleweed at the Sundance base and the moving of Ego Alley's base terminal slightly further uphill to make room for the new building. The Yankee Clipper, renamed to The Clipper for the 1996-1997 season, was again renamed to its current name of the Grand Summit Express.

Mount Snow's most recently built fixed-grip chair, the Discovery Shuttle, was installed in 1998. The lift, a Yan triple chair, was purchased from another resort, as Yan had gone bankrupt two years earlier after the detachable accidents.

In February 2007, Mount Snow was bought by Peak Resorts.

In 2011, Mount Snow replaced the aging Summit Local fixed-grip triple with the Bluebird Express, New England's first high-speed detachable six-pack bubble, which quickly became Mount Snow's flagship lift. It was installed by Leitner-Poma, who also renovated the Grand Summit Express the same year with terminal upgrades and new chairs.

On September 24, 2019, Peak Resorts, along with Mount Snow, was purchased by Vail Resorts, joining Vail's portfolio of 37 resorts and its Epic Pass.

Mount Snow's most recent chairlift changes occurred in 2022. The Sunbrook quad was replaced by a high-speed quad, the Sunbrook Express. The Sundance Express, a high-speed six-pack, replaced both the Tumbleweed and Sundance fixed-grip triples. Both lifts were installed by Doppelmayr..

Mount Snow's Kelly Clark, bronze medalist of 2014 Olympic Women's half-pipe, won the first American gold medal of the 2002 Winter Olympics in Salt Lake City in women's half-pipe. She is a graduate of the Mount Snow Academy and the first athlete from Mount Snow to win an Olympic gold medal. Another Mount Snow Academy graduate, Devin Logan, won the silver medal of the 2014 Winter Olympics in Sochi in the Olympic debut of slopestyle. Eliza Outtrim, who placed 6th in women's moguls, also attended MSA.

In January 2009, Mount Snow hosted the winter Dew Tour. It was the first action sports tour for winter sports and is owned and operated by Alli, the Alliance of Action Sports. Many of the top athletes in action sports from around the world participated in the Winter Dew Tour. Athletes such as Shaun White, Hannah Teter, Tanner Hall, Andreas Wiig, Gretchen Bleiler, Simon Dumont, Sarah Burke, and Travis Rice all vied for the Dew Cup, awarded at season's end.

== Climate ==
Climate data for Mount Snow Peak 42.9601 N, 72.9241 W, Elevation: 3,432 ft (1,046 m) (1991–2020 normals)
Month	Jan	Feb	Mar	Apr	May	Jun	Jul	Aug	Sep	Oct	Nov	Dec	Year
Mean daily maximum °F (°C)	24.4 (−4.2)	26.4 (−3.1)	33.6 (0.9)	45.6 (7.6)	57.8 (14.3)	66.0 (18.9)	70.3 (21.3)	69.2 (20.7)	63.4 (17.4)	51.5 (10.8)	39.3 (4.1)	29.6 (−1.3)	48.1 (9.0)
Daily mean °F (°C)	16.1 (−8.8)	17.2 (−8.2)	24.4 (−4.2)	35.9 (2.2)	47.4 (8.6)	56.0 (13.3)	60.5 (15.8)	59.3 (15.2)	53.5 (11.9)	42.1 (5.6)	31.5 (−0.3)	22.0 (−5.6)	38.8 (3.8)
Mean daily minimum °F (°C)	7.7 (−13.5)	8.0 (−13.3)	15.2 (−9.3)	26.2 (−3.2)	37.1 (2.8)	46.1 (7.8)	50.7 (10.4)	49.3 (9.6)	43.6 (6.4)	32.6 (0.3)	23.7 (−4.6)	14.4 (−9.8)	29.6 (−1.4)
Average precipitation inches (mm)	5.54 (141)	4.43 (113)	5.18 (132)	5.37 (136)	5.17 (131)	5.89 (150)	5.02 (128)	5.53 (140)	5.33 (135)	6.25 (159)	5.19 (132)	6.56 (167)	65.46 (1,664)
Source: PRISM Climate Group

== Lifts and trails ==
=== Trails ===
Number of Trails: 86

- 16% Novice
- 66% More Difficult
- 17% Most Difficult
- 1% Expert

Mount Snow is made up of four separate mountain areas: Main Face, North Face, Sunbrook, and Carinthia. Within the Main Face is the Sundance sub-base area, which features a separate base lodge. The Main Face also features the Launch Pad, a learning area adjacent to the ski school's Discovery Center serviced by a fixed-grip triple chair, Discovery Shuttle. The North Face, fittingly located to the north of Main Face, is home to some of Mount Snow's most advanced terrain, including its only double-black diamond, Ripcord. Opposite of the North Face on the southern face of the mountain is Sunbrook, which offers scenic intermediate-level trails. Carinthia, which has its own base lodge, is home to the biggest terrain park in the east; with 11 terrain parks, 125+ features, a mini-pipe, and a superpipe with 18-foot walls. The parks range from expert to beginner-level features.

=== Lift system ===
Mount Snow features 18 lifts. This includes six detachable chairlifts, six fixed-grip chairlifts, and six surface lifts.

Main Face:

Number	Lift Name	Type	Manufacturer	Built	Length (feet)	Ride Time	Notes
4	Covered Bridge	Magic Carpet				2 mins	Tubing hill lift
5	Mercury	Magic Carpet				1 min	
7	Sundance Express	High-Speed Six	Doppelmayr	2022	6397	6.5 mins	
9	Canyon Express	High-Speed Quad	Poma	1996	5506	4.5 mins	
11	Grand Summit Express	High-Speed Quad	Yan/Poma/Leitner-Poma	1987	7320	7.5 mins	Known as Yankee Clipper until 1996, then renamed Clipper for one season. Originally built by Yan, retrofitted by Poma in 1996 with new carrier grips and terminal modifications, and received new chairs and terminal upgrades in 2011.
16	Seasons	Fixed-Grip Double	Hall	1972	485	3 mins	
17	Bluebird Express	High-Speed Six Bubble	Leitner-Poma	2011	7236	7.2 mins	
24	Voyager	Rope Tow				1 min	
25	Gemini	Magic Carpet				1 min	
27	Apollo	Magic Carpet				1 min	
28	Discovery Shuttle	Fixed-Grip Triple	Yan	1998	350	1.2 min	Relocated chair purchased from outside resort

Carinthia Lifts:

Number	Lift Name	Type	Manufacturer	Built	Length (feet)	Ride Time	Notes
1	Grommet	Magic Carpet				2 mins	
2	Nitro Express	High-Speed Quad	Poma	1997	5029	5.6 mins	
3	Heavy Metal	Fixed-Grip Triple	Yan	1987	3239	7.2 mins	Known as Fairway until 1997, then renamed Old Ironsides for a short time. Originally a double lift, received Yan triple chairs from the removed Sundance triple in 2022.

North Face:

Number	Lift Name	Type	Manufacturer	Built	Length (feet)	Ride Time	Notes
10	Outpost	Fixed-Grip Triple	Carlevaro & Savio/Yan/CTEC	1963	3939	8 mins	Known as North Face until the early 2000s. Originally a Carlevaro & Savio double chair, received Yan terminal upgrades in the 1980s and CTEC towers and triple chairs in 1987.
18	Challenger	Fixed-Grip Triple	Yan	1982	3700	7 mins	

Sunbrook:

Number	Lift Name	Type	Manufacturer	Built	Length (feet)	Ride Time	Notes
14	Beartrap	Fixed-Grip Double	Carlevaro & Savio/Yan	1969	977	2 mins	Known as Sunbrook until 1985. Originally a Carlevaro & Savio double chair, received Yan drive terminal in 1985, CTEC return terminal in 1990, and Yan towers and chairs in 1992.
19	Sunbrook Express	High-Speed Quad	Doppelmayr	2022	4396	4.5 mins	

Retired Lifts:

Number	Lift Name	Type	Manufacturer	Years in Service	Notes
1	Little Beaver	Conveyor Double	Ramsey	1954-1984	Replaced by Beaver triple. One of original two Mount Snow chairlifts. Chain-drived conveyor style chair.
2	Exhibition/Standard	Fixed-Grip Double	Ramsey	1954-~1971	Originally Exhibition double, later Standard double. One of original two Mount Snow chairlifts. Chain-drived conveyor style chair. Replaced by Snowdance double.
3	Summit	Conveyor Double	Ramsey	1955-~1970	Chain-drived conveyor style chair.
4	Mixing Bowl	Conveyor Double	Ramsey	1956-1997	Chain-drived conveyor style chair. Replaced by magic carpet.
5	Sap Bucket	Conveyor Double	Ramsey	1957-1982	Chain-drived conveyor style chair.
6	South Bowl	Conveyor Double	Ramsey	1958-1966	Chain-drived conveyor style chair. Replaced by T-bar for short time.
7	Sundance	Fixed-Grip Double	Carlevaro & Savio	1960-1984	One of first two traditional fixed-grip chairlifts at Mount Snow. Replaced by Sundance triple.
8	Beaver	Fixed-Grip Double	Carlevaro & Savio	1960-1984	One of first two traditional fixed-grip chairlifts at Mount Snow. Replaced by Beaver triple.
9	Snowdance/Standard	Fixed-Grip Double	Carlevaro & Savio	1961-1996	Originally Snowdance double, later renamed Standard. Received Yan terminal and chairs in the early 1980s. Replaced by Canyon Express quad.
G1	G1	Double Gondola	Carlevaro & Savio	1965-1987	Replaced by Yankee Clipper/Grand Summit Express quad.
T	Air Car	Quad Tram	Carlevaro & Savio	1965-1977	Transported riders from Snow Lake Lodge to Mount Snow's base. Removed after 1977 sale due to high costs deemed unnecessary.
G2	G2	Double Gondola	Carlevaro & Savio	1969-1985	Replaced by Ego Alley triple. Some original Carlevaro & Savio lattice towers remain on new lift.
15	Canyon	Fixed-Grip Double	Hall	1971-1996	Replaced by Canyon Express quad.
17	Summit Triple/Local	Fixed-Grip Triple	Yan	1978-2011	First triple chair installed at Mount Snow. Replaced by Bluebird Express six-pack.
1	Ski Baba	Fixed-Grip Double	Borvig	1979-2016	First chairlift installed at Carinthia. Last Vermont chair without a safety bar due to low height and grandfathered status. Replaced by magic carpet.
2	Carinthia	Fixed-Grip Double	Riblet	1983-1997	Replaced by Nitro Express quad.
7	Sundance	Fixed-Grip Triple	Yan	1984-2022	Originally based at Sundance base area, base terminal later moved uphill to 3/4 of original lift length in 1997 after Tumbleweed chair installed along original bottom section of chair. Replaced by Sundance Express.
8	Beaver	Fixed-Grip Triple	Yan	1984-1997	Relocated to Sundance area as Tumbleweed triple after Grand Summit Hotel opened along original lift line.
19	Sunbrook	Fixed-Grip Quad	CTEC	1990-2022	Replaced by Sunbrook Express quad.
8	Tumbleweed	Fixed-Grip Triple	Yan	1997-2022	Relocation of Beaver triple. Replaced by Sundance Express six-pack.
12	Ego Alley	Fixed-Grip Triple	Yan	1985-2025	Many of the towers are Carlevaro & Savio from the G2 gondola, built in 1969, which Ego Alley replaced.

== Year-round services ==
Mount Snow has a variety of dining and retail options. Naturespa in the Grand Summit Resort Hotel offers an array of spa services and Mount Snow has a variety of lodging properties. Mount Snow Realty is also available for buying and selling homes in and around the valley.

== Recent capital projects ==
In the fall of 2017, Mount Snow completed a $30m snowmaking expansion and upgrade project of replacing miles of snowmaking pipe across the mountain to maximize the 645 new low-energy fan guns and built a new 120 million gallon snowmaking pond, called West Lake. The winter of 2018/2019 also saw the completion of the $22M Carinthia Base Lodge in the Carinthia Base Area, which broke ground in June 2017. In 2022, Mount Snow installed its most recent chairlift upgrades, the Doppelmayr-built Sundance and Sunbrook Express chairs.

== Summer operations ==
Mount Snow is one of the first ski resorts in the nation to offer lift service mountain biking. Mount Snow Bike Park is open for downhill mountain biking, golfing is at Mount Snow Golf Club, and hiking and scenic chairlift rides. Outdoor Exploration Camp provides kids and teens with daily activities and adventures.

== See also ==
- Kelly Clark
- Dew Tour
- X Games
