= Molly Aguirre =

American snowboarder (born 1984)

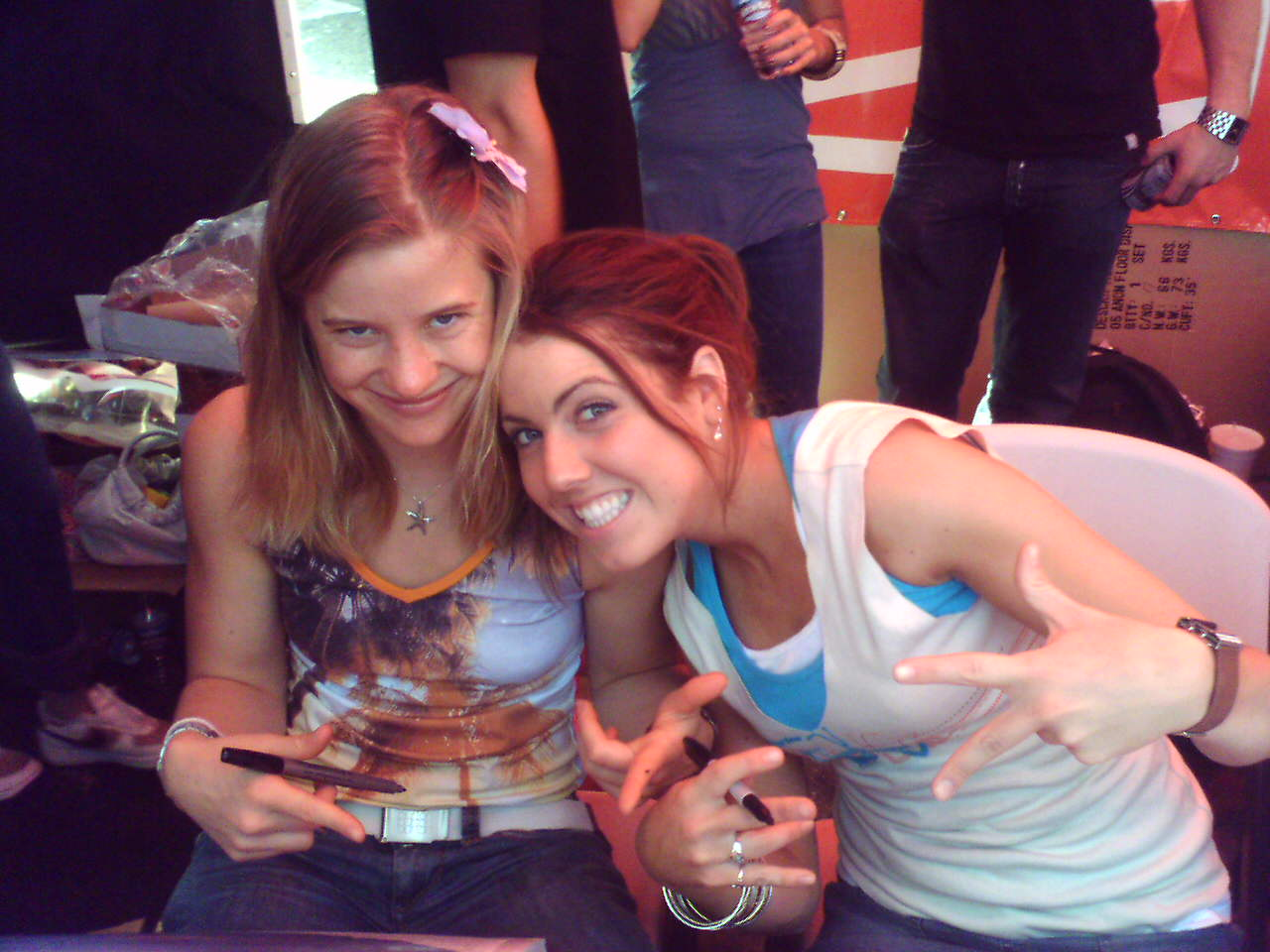
- Hannah Teter and Aguirre in 2005

Personal information
- National team: United States Ski and Snowboard Association
- Citizenship: American

Sport
- Country: United States
- Sport: Snowboarding
- Event: Halfpipe

Molly Aguirre (born September 10, 1984) is a professional snowboarder and member of the U.S. Snowboarding Team, specializing in halfpipe events. She was in the film Snow Blind.

Besides halfpipe, Aguirre also snowboards slopestyle, grind/rail, and quarter pipe events. She was the first female snowboarder to perform a backside 900 in competition. She trained in Mammoth Lakes.

== Career ==
Aguirre's first pro event was in 2002. She was often associated with brother Mason who was a pro snowboarder. She later left Burton and made the transfer to DC. In 2009, she stepped aside from snowboarding to pursue a career in nursing. Aguirre attended nursing school at California State University Channel Islands.
