= Kelly Clark =

American snowboarder (born 1983)

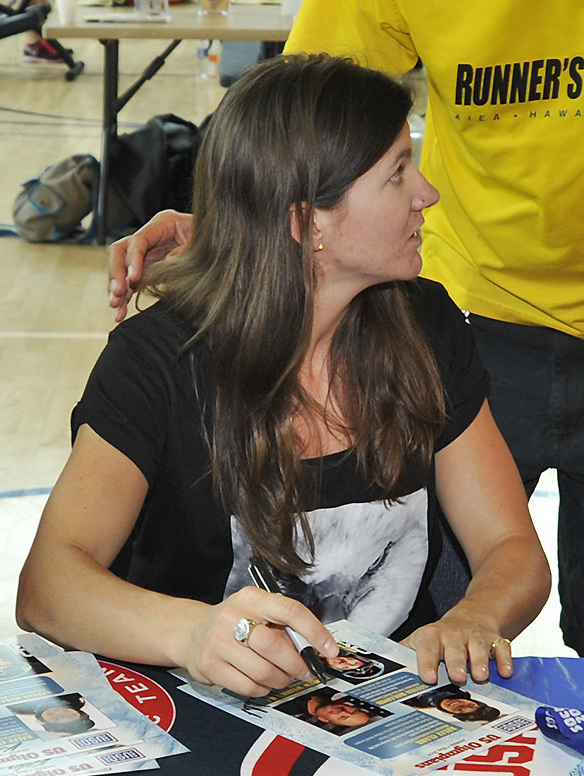
- Clark in 2014

Personal information
- Born: July 26, 1983 (age 42) Newport, Rhode Island, U.S.
- Home town: West Dover, Vermont, U.S.
- Occupation: Professional snowboarder
- Spouse: Marcus Hemington (m. 2023)
Medal record
Women's Snowboarding
Representing the United States
Olympic Games
| Gold medal – first place | 2002 Salt Lake City | Halfpipe |
| Bronze medal – third place | 2010 Vancouver | Halfpipe |
| Bronze medal – third place | 2014 Sochi | Halfpipe |
Winter Dew Tour
| Gold medal – first place | 2008-2009 Winter Dew Tour | Superpipe |
| Silver medal – second place | 2008 Breckenridge | Superpipe |
| Silver medal – second place | 2009 Mt. Snow | Superpipe |
| Silver medal – second place | 2009 Northstar-at-Tahoe | Superpipe |
Winter X Games
| Gold medal – first place | 2002 Aspen | Superpipe |
| Gold medal – first place | 2006 Aspen | Superpipe |
| Gold medal – first place | 2011 Aspen | Superpipe |
| Gold medal – first place | 2012 Aspen | Superpipe |
| Gold medal – first place | 2013 Aspen | Superpipe |
| Gold medal – first place | 2013 Tignes | Superpipe |
| Gold medal – first place | 2014 Aspen | Superpipe |
| Silver medal – second place | 2003 Aspen | Superpipe |
| Silver medal – second place | 2004 Aspen | Superpipe |
| Silver medal – second place | 2009 Aspen | Superpipe |
| Silver medal – second place | 2010 Aspen | Superpipe |
| Silver medal – second place | 2015 Aspen | Superpipe |
| Silver medal – second place | 2016 Oslo | Superpipe |
| Bronze medal – third place | 2008 Aspen | Superpipe |
New Zealand Winter Games
| Gold medal – first place | 2013 Cardrona | Halfpipe |

Kelly Clark (born July 26, 1983) is an American snowboarder who won halfpipe gold at the 2002 Winter Olympics. Clark was born in Newport, Rhode Island. She started snowboarding when she was 7 years old, began competing in 1999, and became a member of the US Snowboard team in 2000. On January 25, 2019, at the Winter X Games in Aspen, she announced her retirement from the sport.

== Biography ==
Clark trained for competitive snowboarding at Mount Snow Academy in Vermont and graduated in spring 2001. She won a gold medal for women's halfpipe at the 2002 Winter Olympics and competed in the halfpipe event again in the 2006 Winter Olympics. She ended up placing fourth behind fellow Americans Hannah Teter and Gretchen Bleiler, as well as Norwegian Kjersti Buaas. In the 2010 Vancouver Olympics Kelly won a bronze medal in the halfpipe after placing third behind American silver medalist Teter and Australian Torah Bright.

In the TTR World Tour 2007/2008 season, she recorded eight podium finishes out of 12 contest entries, with five of those as TTR Titles including the 6Star Burton European Open, the 5Star Chevrolet Grand Prix and the 6Star season-ending Roxy Chicken Jam US. In the 2008/2009 World Tour she finished the season as Swatch TTR World Snowboard Tour Champion.

Clark is based in Mammoth Lakes, California.

Clark is a Christian. She rides with a sticker on her snowboard proclaiming, "Jesus, I cannot hide my love." She discusses her faith and lessons from her life as a professional snowboarder in her 2017 memoir Inspired.

== Personal life ==
Clark married Marcus Hemington in March 2023. In May 2024, she gave birth to a daughter, Josephine.

== Awards and honors ==
In 2015, Clark received the Best Female Action Sports Athlete ESPY Award.

== Competition history ==
Highlights of Swatch TTR 2009/2010 Season

- 1st – Halfpipe – 5Star Burton New Zealand Open (Ticket to Ride (World Snowboard Tour))
- 1st – Halfpipe – 6Star Burton US Open (Ticket to Ride (World Snowboard Tour))
- 1st – Halfpipe – 6Star Roxy Chicken Jam US (Ticket to Ride (World Snowboard Tour))

Highlights of Swatch TTR 2008/2009 Season Swatch TTR World Snowboard Tour Champion 2008/09

- 3rd – Halfpipe – 5Star Burton New Zealand Open (Ticket to Ride (World Snowboard Tour))
- 1st – Halfpipe – 6Star Burton European Open (Ticket to Ride (World Snowboard Tour))
- 1st – Halfpipe – 5Star Nissan X-Trail Asian Open (Ticket to Ride (World Snowboard Tour))
- 2nd – Halfpipe – 6Star Burton US Open (Ticket to Ride (World Snowboard Tour))
- 1st – Halfpipe – 6Star Roxy Chicken Jam (Ticket to Ride (World Snowboard Tour))

Victories on the Swatch TTR World Snowboard Tour (status: July 2010)

| TTR Star Level | Number of victories |
|---|---|
| 6Star Event | 7 victories |
| 5Star Event | 4 victories |
| 4Star Event | 2 victories |

Career highlights

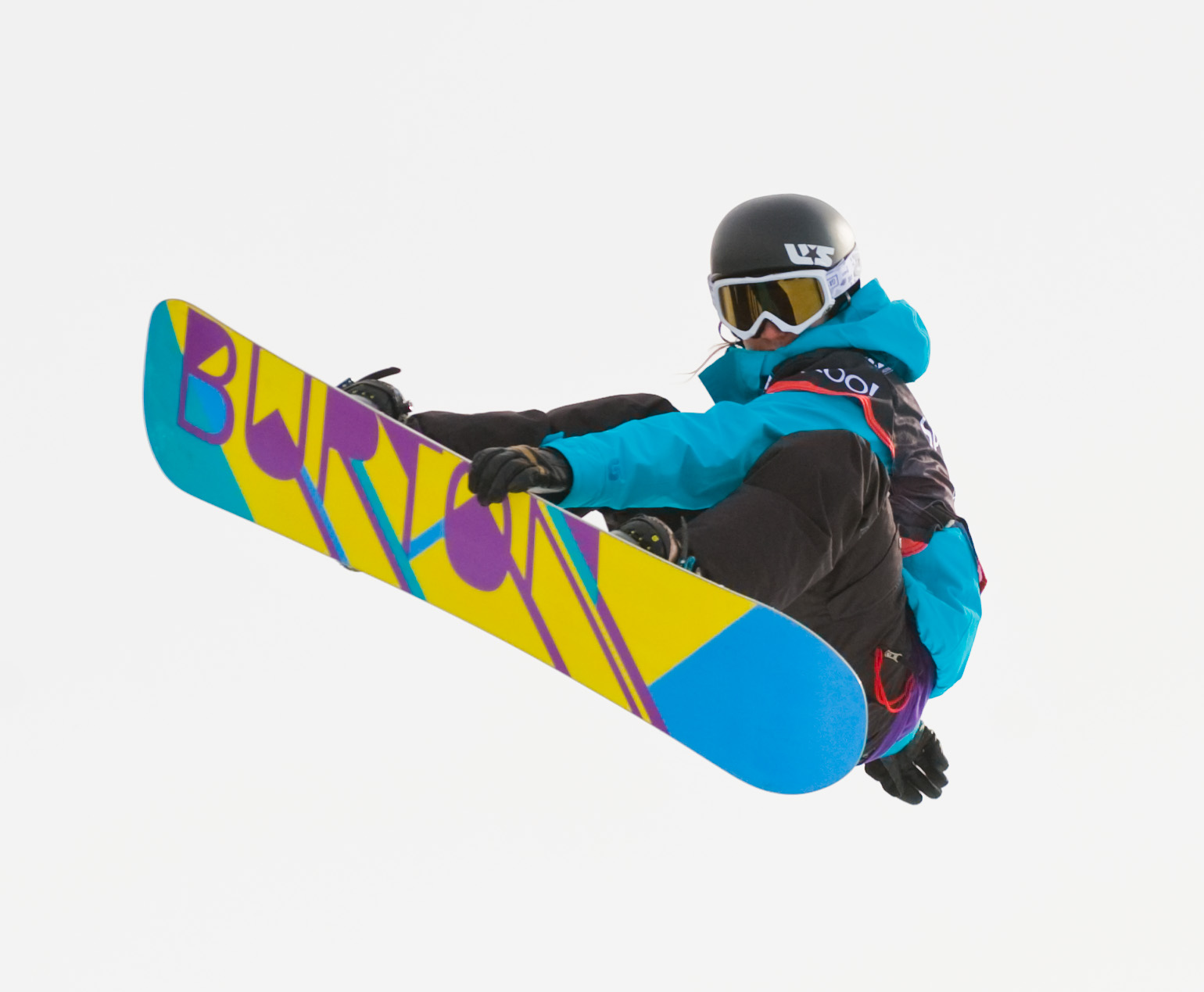
Clark in 2010

- 2010 Winter X Games – Superpipe – 1st place
- 2009 Winter Dew Tour – Dew Cup – 1st place
- 2008 Chevy Grand Prix – Tamarack – Halfpipe – 1st place
- 2008 Winter X Games – Halfpipe – 2nd place
- 2007 New Zealand Open – Quarterpipe – 1st place
- 2007 New Zealand Open – Halfpipe – 2nd place
- 2007 Burton Abominable Snow Jam – Overall – 2nd place
- 2007 Burton Abominable Snow Jam – Halfpipe – 2nd place
- 2006 US Grand Prix – Halfpipe – 1st pace
- 2006 Burton New Zealand Open – Quarterpipe – 1st place
- 2006 Burton New Zealand Open – Superpipe – 1st place
- 2006 Chevrolet Grand Prix – Halfpipe – 2nd place
- 2005 FIS World Cup – Halfpipe – 1st place
- 2005 Grand Prix #3- Halfpipe – 2nd place

== See also ==
- List of athletes with the most appearances at Olympic Games
- Mount Snow
