= Tanner Hall (skier) =

American freeskier

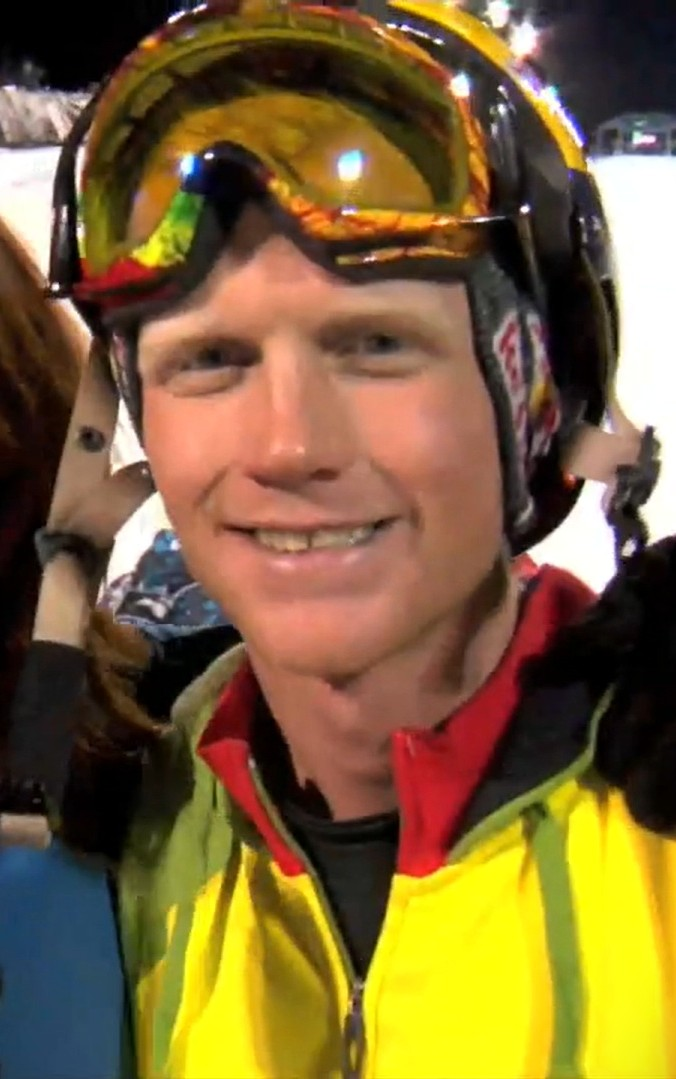
- Hall in 2009

Personal information
- Born: October 26, 1983 (age 42)
- Height: 5 ft 8 in (173 cm)
- Weight: 150 lb (68 kg)

Sport
- Country: United States
- Sport: Freestyle skiing
- Events: Half pipe, Slopestyle
Medal record
Men's freestyle skiing
Representing the United States
Winter X Games
Gold medal – first place	2001 Mount Snow	Big Air
Gold medal – first place	2002 Aspen	SlopeStyle
Gold medal – first place	2003 Aspen	SlopeStyle
Gold medal – first place	2004 Aspen	SlopeStyle
Gold medal – first place	2006 Aspen	Superpipe
Gold medal – first place	2007 Aspen	Superpipe
Gold medal – first place	2008 Aspen	Superpipe
Silver medal – second place	2003 Aspen	Superpipe
Silver medal – second place	2005 Aspen	Superpipe
Silver medal – second place	2005 Aspen	SlopeStyle
Silver medal – second place	2009 Aspen	Superpipe

Tanner Hall (born October 26, 1983) is an American freeskier.

== Biography ==
Hall, nicknamed 'Ski Boss', was born in Kalispell, Montana where he grew up skiing at Big Mountain, now named Whitefish Mountain Resort, starting at age three. He joined the freestyle ski team at age 10, skiing moguls and aerials until age 15 when he moved to Park City, Utah to pursue freeskiing. His first major competition was the US Open in Vail, Colorado

In 2002, Hall co-founded the freeride ski company Armada Skis with skier JP Auclair and photographer Chris O'Connell. Hall is also part owner of the Retallack Snowcat Operation near Nelson, BC, Canada, along with skier Seth Morrison.

In March 2005, while attempting a switch cork 900 over the legendary Chad's Gap in Wasatch backcountry, Utah, he pulled up short, hit the knuckle and then ragdolled down the landing, breaking both ankles. His quote of "my ankles are broken, my ankles are broke" has become famous in the snow sports world. Hall's injuries put him out for the rest of the season but he returned in 2006 to win gold at both the US Freeskiing Open and the Winter X-Games.

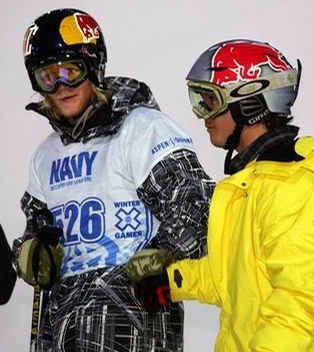
Hall with Simon Dumont at Winter X 12

His attempt at a fourth gold in slopestyle was upset by Charles Gagnier and in 2009 he lost a fourth straight superpipe gold to Xavier Bertoni.

After overshooting a jump at Stevens Pass, in May 2009, in Washington, he went on hiatus for just over a year. He suffered from tibial plateau fractures and ACL tears in both knees. Hall returned to training on trampolines during summer 2010.

Hall embraces the Rasta culture and supports the marijuana lifestyle. His DaKine line is called THC, which stand for the "Tanner Hall Collection" but is a play on the abbreviation for tetrahydrocannabinol, the psychoactive substance in cannabis. Hall is the co-founder of Inspired Media Concepts, a film and record company that focuses on rasta music and producing ski movies and webisodes.

After an 11-year relationship, Red Bull dropped their sponsorship of Tanner Hall at the Red Bull High Performance ski camp in New Zealand on August 29, 2012.

In February 2016, Hall became the first active professional athlete to create a pro model cannabis product and build a partnership with a cannabis company. Adventure travel brand Black Rock Originals created “The SKIBOSS Collection", a trio of products including rolling papers, a lighter and grinder; the three key item one needs to roll a joint.

== Career achievements ==
1999

- 1st – Jim Moran Benefit Slopestyle (day 2)
- 2nd – Jim Moran Benefit Slopestyle (day 1)
- 4th – US Open Slopestyle

2000

- 1st – X Games Qualifier Big Air
- 1st – X Games Big Air
- 1st – US Open Big Air

2001

- 1st – Red Bull Huckfest Big Air
- 1st – X Games Qualifier Big Air
- 1st – X Games-Big Air,
- 2nd – Core Xtreme Games Big Air
- 2nd – Core Xtreme Games QP
- 3rd – US Freeskiing Open Slopestyle

2002

- 1st – X Games Slopestyle
- 1st – US Open Slopestyle
- 1st – Red Bull Huckfest Big Air
- 1st – Whistler Ski Invitational Big Air
- 1st – Cham Jam Slopestyle
- 1st – Ultimate Bumps & Jumps Half Pipe
- 2nd – US Open Big Air
- 2nd – Ultimate Bumps & Jumps Big Air
- 2nd – Ultimate Bumps & Jumps Moguls

2003

- 1st – X Games Slopestyle
- 1st – US Open Slopestyle
- 1st – Whistler Ski Invitational Big Air
- 1st – Ultimate Bumps & Jumps Big Air
- 1st – Park City All Stars Rail Jam
- 1st – West Coast Invitational Rail Jam
- 2nd – X Games Half Pipe
- 2nd – US Open Big Air
- 2nd – Whistler Ski Invitational Big Air
- 2nd – Ultimate Bumps & Jumps Half Pipe
- 2nd – Paul Mitchel Huck & Roll Half Pipe
- 2nd – Paul Mitchell Huck & Roll Slopestyle

2004

- 1st – X Games Slopestyle
- 1st – BMW X3 FreeSki Invite
- 1st – Whistler Ski Invitational Half Pipe
- 1st – NorAm World Cup Half Pipe
- 2nd – US Open Half Pipe
- 2nd – World Superpipe Championships Half Pipe
- 2nd – NorAm World Cup Half Pipe

2005

- 1st – US Open Half Pipe
- 2nd – X Games Half Pipe
- 2nd – X Games Slopestyle
- 2nd – US Open Slopestyle

2006

- 1st – X Games Half Pipe
- 1st – US Open Half Pipe

2007

- 1st – X Games Half Pipe
- 1st – US Open Half Pipe

2008

- 1st – X Games Half Pipe
- 1st – New Zealand Open Half Pipe

2009

- 1st – Dew Tour Northstar Half Pipe
- 1st – Dew Tour Breckenridge Half Pipe
- 2nd – X Games Half Pipe
- 3rd – Dew Tour Mt. Snow Half Pipe

2012

- 1st – NZ Freeski Open Half Pipe.

== Film appearances ==
Poor Boyz Productions

Twenty (2014)

- Everyday is a Saturday (2009)
- Reasons (2008)
- Propaganda (2001
- Session 12:42 (2003)
- Happy Dayz (2002)
- War (2005)
- 13 (1999)

Inspired Media Concepts

- Ring The Alarm (2016)
- Let It Flow (2013)
- The Education Of Style (2012)
- Retallack: The Movie (2011)

Others

- MTV Scarred (2007)
- RE: Session (2009)
- The Massive (2008)
- Believe (2008)
- Burger Time
- Show & Prove
- WSKI 106
- The GAME
- The Front Nine
- High Society
- Yearbook
- Teddybear Crisis
- Strike Three
- The Realm
- Second Generation
- The Funkshow Diaries
- Further
- Scandalous
- Los Alamos
- Area 51
- 41 Degrees
- Balance
- Mind the Addiction
- Subject to Change
- David Lesh's "This Friday"
