= Colby James West =

American freestyle skier

- Born: April 8, 1985
- Height: 5 ft 8 in (173 cm)

Colby James West (born 1985) is an American freestyle skier from Canterbury, New Hampshire. A late starter in skiing, Colby took up freestyle skiing when he was 23 years old and broke into the competitive scene with a podium finish in slope style at Winter X Games XII. West is a three time Winter X Games bronze medalist. Colby has filmed many segments for Matchstick Productions.

Colby is well known for his humorous internet videos such as the music video "My Friend's A Pro". Colby was featured on a television commercial for Worx Energy Drinks.

== Results ==
- 3rd 2009 Toyota Championship, Superpipe, Northstar at Tahoe, CA
- 3rd 2009 Winter X 13, Slopestyle, Aspen, CO
- 5th 2009 Winter X 13, Superpipe, Aspen, CO
- 1st 2008 US Open, Big Air, Copper Mountain, CO
- 3rd 2008 Winter X Games, Superpipe, Aspen, CO
- 4th 2008 Winter X Games, Slopestyle, Aspen, CO
- 3rd 2007 Winter X Games, Slopestyle, Aspen, CO
- 1st 2008 48 Straight, Superpipe Championship, ID
