= Simon Dumont =

American freestyle skier

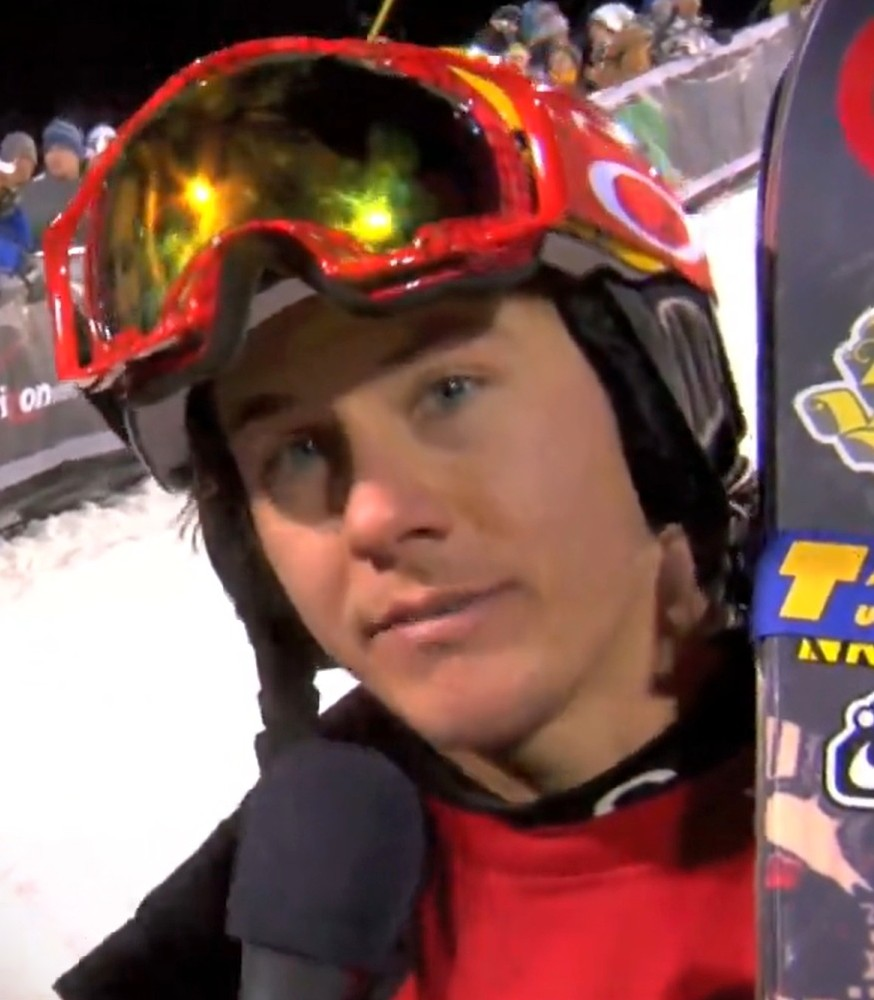
- Dumont in 2009

Personal information
- Full name: Simon Francis Dumont
- Born: July 9, 1986 (age 40) Bethel, Maine, U.S.
- Height: 5 ft 7 in (1.70 m)

Sport
- Sport: Skiing

World Cup career
- Seasons: 9
- Indiv. podiums: 12
- Indiv. wins: 4

Achievements and titles
- Personal best: World Record - 35.5' Out of 38' Quarterpipe
Medal record
Men's freestyle skiing
Representing the United States
FIS Freestyle World Ski Championships
Bronze medal – third place	2011 Deer Valley	Halfpipe
Winter X Games
Gold medal – first place	2004 Aspen	Superpipe
Gold medal – first place	2005 Aspen	Superpipe
Gold medal – first place	2009 Aspen	Big Air
Gold medal – first place	2009 Fairmont	Railjam
Silver medal – second place	2007 Aspen	Superpipe
Silver medal – second place	2008 Aspen	Superpipe
Bronze medal – third place	2009 Aspen	Superpipe
Bronze medal – third place	2011 Aspen	Superpipe
Bronze medal – third place	2013 Aspen	Superpipe

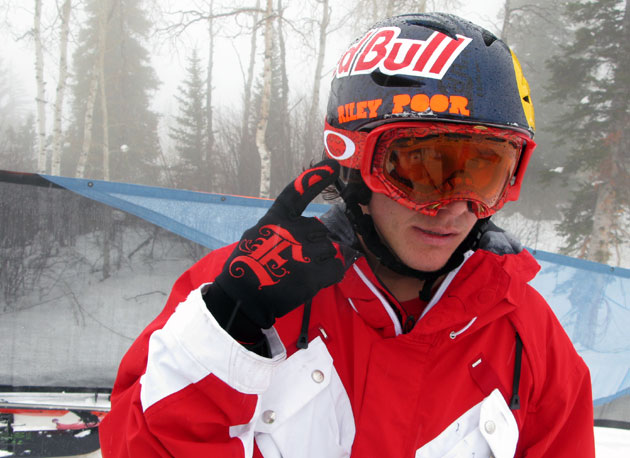
Dumont in 2010

Simon Francis Dumont (born July 9, 1986) is an American freestyle skier.

== Skiing ==
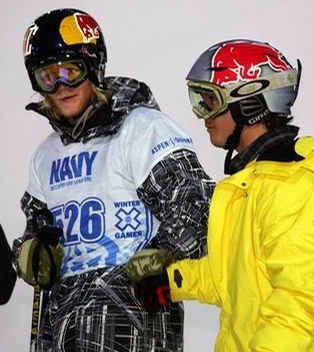
Dumont with Tanner Hall in 2008

Dumont is known for his exceptional amplitude in half-pipe competitions, regularly reaching heights up to 20 feet (6 m) out of the pipe, and for his signature big-air trick, the superman double-frontflip. In 2006-07, Dumont overshot a 100-foot (30 m) jump in Park City, Utah, by some 80 feet (24 m), landing flat, rupturing his spleen and breaking his pelvis in three places, but he returned to skiing only two months later. In 2009 he won the X Games Big Air competition by landing a double-frontflip.

Dumont has participated in many freestyle events, mostly in the categories of big air and half-pipe, and was part of Team America for the Jon Olsson Super Sessions (JOSS) along with American freestyle skiers Tom Wallisch, and Alex Schlopy. However, the group has withdrawn from all future JOSS events because of an argument with Olsson about the release date of their video for the competition.

In 2008, Jon Olsson and Dumont announced their involvement in a new open freeskiing event, the North American Open, at Breckenridge, Colorado.

=== World quarterpipe record ===
On April 11, 2008, Simon Dumont set the current world quarter-pipe height record at Sunday River in Newry, Maine. He aired 35.5 feet out of a 38-foot quarter-pipe, while performing a cork 900 tail grab. Previous attempts earlier in the week had resulted in Dumont falling 55 feet after hitting an over-vert section of the quarter-pipe. On various other attempts, Simon hit the snow with a flat landing, severely bruising his heel in the process. On April 22, 2008, Dumont was a guest on The Ellen DeGeneres Show where he discussed his record-setting performance.

=== Dumont Cup ===
On April 11, 2009, Dumont hosted what was called the inaugural occasion of an annual contest for skiers ranging in age from about 8 to 18 at Sunday River. A specific course was set out for the contest with a combination of rails, boxes, and jumps. All entrants had a chance to qualify for the final few runs with pro skiers like Dumont, with a chance to win a spot on the podium. The first-place prize was $10,000, won by American freestyle skier Tom Wallisch.

The second edition of the Dumont Cup was held on March 27, 2010, and was won by amateur freeskier Alex Schlopy. Schlopy out-skied 105 amateur athletes to gain entry into today's semi-finals and finals. During finals, Schlopy and nine others competed against such freeski professionals as Simon Dumont, Peter Olenick, Jossi Wells, and Henrik Harlaut. Schlopy was joined on the podium with Joss Christensen from Park City, Utah who took second place and the 2009 winner of the first-ever Dumont Cup, Tom Wallisch from Salt Lake City, Utah, who took third. Schlopy walked away with $12,000 in cash plus a one-week scholarship to Camp Woodward, an action sports camp and training facility located in Woodward, Penn.

On March 26, 2011 Dumont hosted the 3rd Dumont Cup, changing up the course from the previous years. Nick Goepper got first followed by Gus Kensworthy and Jacob Wester in second and third.

The fourth annual Dumont Cup took place March 24, 2012 despite record-high temperatures and low snow levels. Gus Kenworthy, 2011's runner-up, placed first. Nick Goepper placed second followed by Joss Christensen who placed third.

The 5th annual Dumont Cup winners were

1. Nick Goepper 2. Gus Kenworthy 3. Joss Christensen

The 6th Annual Dumont Cup was March 28–29, 2014.

2014 Dumont Cup Final Results

RANK NAME SCORE 1 Gus Kenworthy 94.7 2 Nick Goepper 93.0 3 Bobby Brown 92.0 4 Evan McEachran 89.0 5 Alex Bellemare 88.0 6 Torin Yater Wallace 87.0 7 Robby Franco 82.3 8 Oscar Wester 77.7 9 Alex Hackel 75.7 10 Cody Cirillo 75.0 11 Tim Ryan 69.0 12 Scott Nelson 63.3 13 Joss Christensen 54.7 14 Colby Stevenson 45.0 15 Noah Morrison 35.3

== Auto racing ==
On April 25, 2009, Simon participated in the Volkswagen Jetta TDI Cup season opening race at Virginia International Raceway as a guest driver in the Red Bull-sponsored #10. Qualifying 25th, he moved up six positions to finish 19th in the 30-minute race. After his performance, Simon commented on a possible future in road racing, saying:

"The entire experience was way more than I ever imagined that it would be. The first time for me to get in a professional-level racecar was yesterday, and I'm definitely hooked," said Dumont. "My goal heading into this was to try to be competitive and not finish last, and I accomplished both goals. I'm going to do some work with my personal sponsors when I get home to see if I might be able to give the series a try full time next year."

Simon also expressed interest in racing full-time after retiring from skiing.

== Personal life ==
Dumont was born in Bethel, Maine, on July 9, 1986, to Francis and Barbara Dumont. Simon has an older brother, a younger sister, and a multitude of cousins. Simon Dumont is Passamaquoddy. Dumont weighs 150 pounds (68 kg) and is 5 feet 7 inches (1.70 m) tall.

He attended Telstar Regional High School in Bethel, where he graduated in 2004. He was a participant in the school's golf program as well as a star soccer player. His home ski resort is Sunday River. Simon also was a child model, and at one point even auditioned for Home Alone three. Simon credits pro skiers Angus Nelson and Jonathan Schulz for his inspiration to start skiing.

=== Business ===
Simon's sponsors include: Target, Oakley, Toyota, Nike 6.0, Red Bull, Mehdi Thrari, Giro, Kicker, Head skis, Sunday River Ski Resort.

Dumont opened up his own clothing company, Empire Attire, in 2008. With his own company, he strives to create things "made by the athletes for the athletes." His company has been successful so far, and has their own website EmpireAttire.com. He has just recently released his line of 2010 products for purchase online. He is also a huge fan of the Toronto Blue Jays.

== Press ==
He was featured in the January 24, 2008, issue of Rolling Stone's article on the X Games:

He first became recognized at the X Games when he was fifteen. At sixteen he competed in Honda Sessions at Vail Resort in Colorado. At seventeen, he won his first gold medals. At age eighteen, he was badly injured in a failed jump at Park City. The video of that crash – he plummets eighty feet to the ground – became an internet phenomenon. Dumont admits he's lucky to be alive. He fractured his pelvis and ruptured his spleen, but just six weeks later he returned to the slopes. Dumont, now 23, figures he's got 3 years of freestyle left in him. "Then I'd like to go backcountry and start landing in powder," he says, "it doesn't hurt so much."
