= Winter X Games XII =

2008 Winter X Games event in Aspen, Colorado

Winter X Games XII (Winter X Games Twelve)
- Location: (United States) Aspen, Colorado
- Dates: January 24–27

Winter X Games XII were held from January 24 to January 27, 2008, in Aspen, Colorado. They were the 7th consecutive Winter X Games to be held in Aspen. Television coverage of Winter X Games XII was broadcast on ESPN and ABC, primarily hosted by Sal Masekela and Todd Harris. Final attendance for the four-day event was 72,500.

== Disciplines ==
Disciplines at the 12th Winter X Games were:

- Skiing
- Snowboarding
- Snowmobiling

== Highlights ==
Skier Tanner Hall won his third consecutive men's superpipe gold medal and his seventh X Games gold medal over all, the most of any winter competitor. This record stood alone until the final night of competition, when Shaun White tied it with a gold medal in the men's snowboard superpipe and set his own record with 12 career Winter X Games medals.

Snowmobile Speed and Style was debuted as a new event on the opening night of competition, combining traditional snocross, a timed race, with trick skill. The event was judged, with completion time and freestyle each making up half of the final score. Levi LaVallee won gold. Tucker Hibbert won his third gold medal in Snocross and his second consecutive. LaVallee's subsequent gold medal win in the snowmobile freestyle made him only the second Winter X Games competitor to win a gold medal in four different events, after Shaun Palmer.

In women's snowboarding, Lindsay Jacobellis regained the gold medal, her fourth, in Women's Snowboard Cross, defeating Swiss boarder Tanja Frieden. Frieden defeated Jacobellis at the 2006 Winter Olympics after Jacobellis fell near the finish line after attempting a trick. Aspen native Gretchen Bleiler won the women's superpipe, defeating the Australian Torah Bright. The women's superpipe final was ceremonially "fore-run" by the late Bibian Mentel, an adaptive snowboarder from the Netherlands, who would eventually win multiple Paralympic snowboarding gold medals in 2014 and 2018.

Big Air events returned to the Winter X Games for the first time in several competitions. There were only four participants in both the skiing and snowboarding big air events. The events were done in a knockout format, with two judges voting and the audience, voting through text messaging, each having equal say as to who advanced to the finals and who won. There were only gold medals awarded for the Big Air events, as they were judged as winner take all competition.

On the final day of competition, the weather deteriorated throughout the day The weather likely affected the turnout, with around 4,000 fewer spectators than Winter X Games XI. The ski cross course was affected by weather conditions as the day went on, and there were several major crashes involving top competitors. Lars Lewen, Juha Haukkala, and Karin Huttary all had to be taken to the hospital following injuries; Enak Gavaggio was involved in the same crash as Lewen, but refused transport. American Daron Rahlves, a three time Olympian, won the gold in the men's event, his first X Games medal. Errol Kerr, who had the fastest time of the day in any heat, did not medal. Sarah Burke defended her gold medal in the women's ski superpipe competition, defeating Swiss ex-snowboarder Mirjam Jaeger.

== Results ==
=== Skiing ===
Men's Monoski Cross

Place	Athlete	Time
Gold	Kees-Jan van der Klooster	117.77
Silver	Tyler Walker	121.52
Bronze	Chris Devlin-Young	161.61

Men's Ski Big Air

Place	Athlete	Semifinal Score
Gold	Jon Olsson
Runner-up	Charles Gagnier	3-0

Men's Ski Cross

Place	Athlete	Time
Gold	Daron Rahlves	86.05
Silver	Stanley Hayer	86.27
Bronze	Casey Puckett	86.61

Women's Ski Cross

Place	Athlete	Time
Gold	Ophelie David	92.19
Silver	Hedda Berntsen	92.70
Bronze	Magdalena Jonsson	93.56

Men's Ski Slopestyle

Place	Athlete	Score
Gold	Andreas Håtveit	94.00
Silver	Jossi Wells	90.00
Bronze	Jon Olsson	87.00

Men's Ski SuperPipe

Place	Athlete	Score
Gold	Tanner Hall	92.33
Silver	Simon Dumont	91.00
Bronze	Colby James West	85.00

Women's Ski SuperPipe

Place	Athlete	Score
Gold	Sarah Burke	92.00
Silver	Mirjam Jaeger	81.33
Bronze	Jen Hudak	78.33

=== Snowboarding ===
Men's Snowboard Big Air

Place	Athlete	Semifinal Score
Gold	Torstein Horgmo	2-1
Runner-up	Kevin Pearce	3-0

Men's Snowboard Cross

Place	Athlete	Time
Gold	Nate Holland	93.48
Silver	Markus Schairer	93.81
Bronze	David Speiser	95.80

Women's Snowboard Cross

Place	Athlete	Time
Gold	Lindsey Jacobellis	102.00
Silver	Tanja Frieden	102.67
Bronze	Sandra Frei	104.33

Men's Snowboard Slopestyle

Place	Athlete	Score
Gold	Andreas Wiig	92.00
Silver	Kevin Pearce	88.33
Bronze	Shaun White	83.33

Women's Snowboard Slopestyle

Place	Athlete	Score
Gold	Jamie Anderson	90.66
Silver	Claudia Fliri	86.33
Bronze	Spencer O'Brien	80.00

Men's Snowboard SuperPipe

Place	Athlete	Score
Gold	Shaun White	96.66
Silver	Ryo Aono	88.00
Bronze	Kevin Pearce	85.66

Women's Snowboard SuperPipe

Place	Athlete	Score
Gold	Gretchen Bleiler	93.33
Silver	Torah Bright	92.66
Bronze	Kelly Clark	90.00

=== Snowmobiling ===
Snocross

Place	Athlete
Gold	Tucker Hibbert
Silver	Brett Turcotte
Bronze	D.J. Eckstrom

Snowmobile Freestyle

Place	Athlete	Score
Gold	Levi LaVallee	87.66
Silver	Joe Parsons	87.33
Bronze	Heath Frisby	92.33 (in consolation)

Snowmobile Speed and Style

Place	Athlete	Score
Gold	Levi LaVallee	91.00
Silver	Sam Rogers	82.07
Bronze	Joe Parsons	92.33 (in consolation)
