= TJ Schiller =

Canadian freestyle skier (born 1986)

Thomas James Schiller
Personal information
- Born: October 17, 1986 (age 39) Vernon, British Columbia, Canada
- Height: 5 ft 11 in (180 cm)
- Weight: 178 lb (81 kg)
Medal record
Men's freestyle skiing
Representing Canada
Winter X Games
Gold medal – first place	2009 Aspen	SlopeStyle
Silver medal – second place	2010 Aspen	Big Air

Thomas James "TJ" Schiller (born October 17, 1986) is a Canadian freestyle skier. Schiller combines amplitude with style and is best known for his signature switch 1080 mute grab. During Winter X Games XIV, Schiller became the first person to land a double cork 1620 (four and a half rotations with two flips). Behind Henrik Harlaut and Andrew Taylor, he is the third person to land a 1620 of any kind in competition. Schiller is the head skier of the Canadian freestyle team.

== Sponsors ==
Nordica Skis and Boots, Nike 6.0, Monster Energy, POC Protection, Dragon, Grenade, Fresh sports, Seirus,

== Results ==
- 2010 2nd Winter X Games Aspen, CO Big Air
- 2009 1st Winter X Games Aspen, CO Slopestyle
- 2007 2nd King Of Style Stockholm, Swe Big Air
- 2007 7th Icer Air San Francisco, Ca Big Air
- 2007 1st Freestyle.ch Zurich, Sui Big Air
- 2007 1st Wsi Whistler, Bc Can Big Air
- 2007 3rd Jon Olsson Invitational Are, Swe Big Air
- 2007 4th Us Open Cooper, Co Big Air
- 2006 1st Winter X Games Aspen, CO Best Trick
- 2006 1st Icer Air San Francisco, Ca Big Air
- 2006 5th Freestyle.ch Zurich, Sui Big Air
- 2006 3rd Jon Olsson Invitational Are, Swe Big Air
- 2006 3rd Total Fight Masters Of Freestyle Andorra Slopestyle
- 2006 9th World Skiing Invitational Whistler, Bc Can Superpipe
- 2006 2nd World Skiing Invitational Whistler, Bc Can Big Air
- 2006 2nd Orage European Freeskiing Open Laax, Sui Slopestyle
- 2006 2nd Paul Mitchell Aft Big Bear, Ca Slopestyle
- 2006 5th Paul Mitchell Aft Breckenridge, Co Slopestyle
- 2006 1st Us Open Vail, Co Big Air
- 2006 6th Us Open Vail, Co Slopestyle
- 2005 3rd Icer Air San Francisco, Ca Big Air
- 2005 9th World Ski Invitational Whistler, Bc Can Superpipe
- 2005 1st World Ski Invitational Whistler, Bc Can Slopestyle
- 2005 3rd Jon Olsson Invitational Are, Swe Big Air
- 2005 1st Gravity Games Copper Mtn, Co Slopestyle
- 2005 5th Gravity Games Copper Mtn, Co Superpipe
- 2005 1st Us Open Vail, Co Big Air
- 2005 11th Us Open Vail, Co Slopestyle
- 2004 1st Ultimate Bumps And Jumps Steamboat Springs, Co Overall
- 2004 4th Ultimate Bumps And Jumps Steamboat Springs, Co Moguls
- 2004 1st Ultimate Bumps And Jumps Steamboat Springs, Co Big Air
- 2004 3rd World Skiing Invitational Whistler, Bc Can Big Air
- 2004 4th World Skiing Invitational Whistler, Bc Can Superpipe
- 2004 6th World Skiing Invitational Whistler, Bc Can Rail Session
- 2004 1st Us Open Vail, Co Slopestyle
- 2004 2nd US Open Vail, Co Big Air
