= Torah Bright =

Australian professional snowboarder

Torah Bright OAM
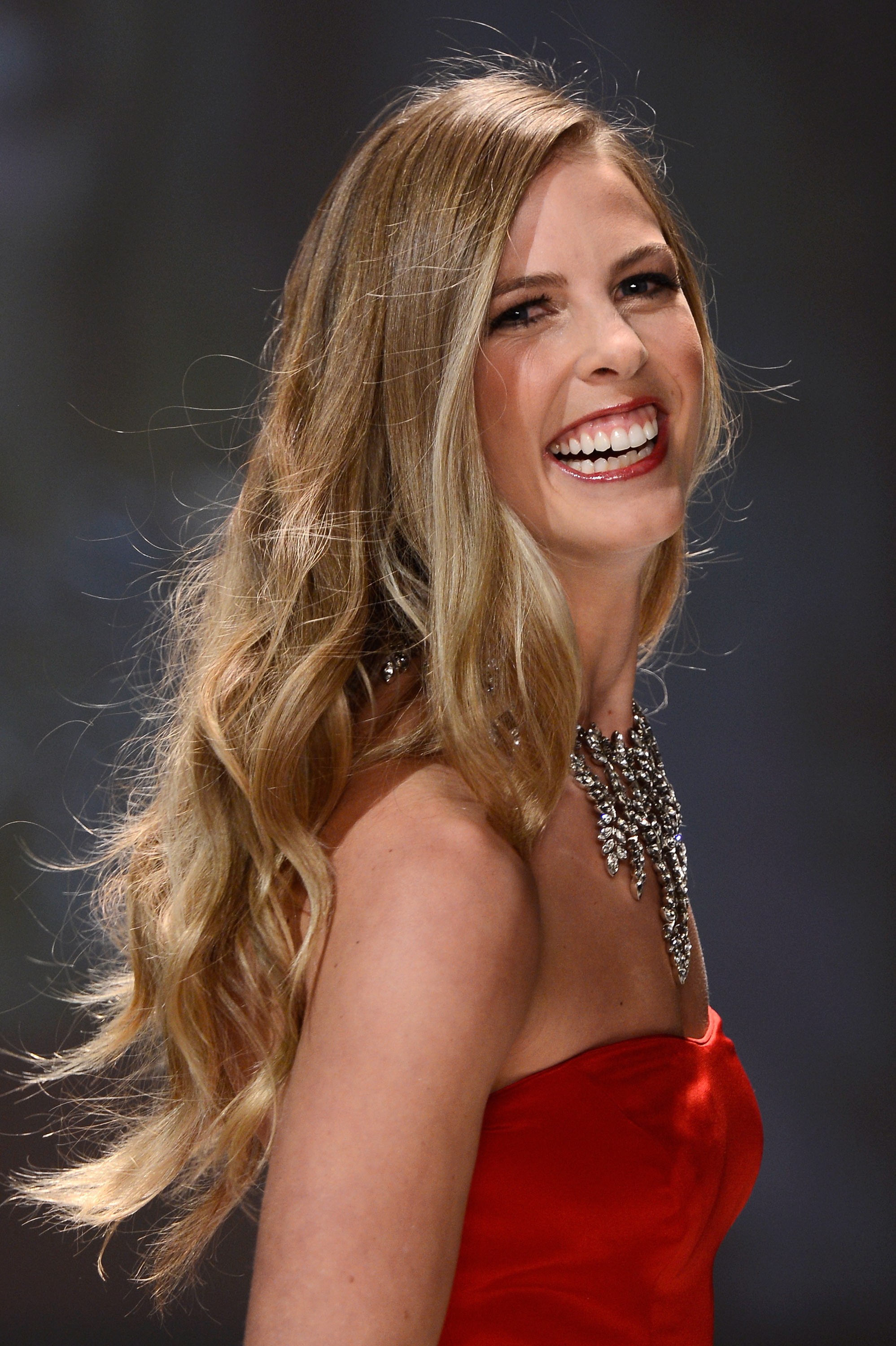
- Bright modelling in the 2013 The Heart Truth show in New York City

Personal information
- Full name: Torah Jane Bright
- Born: 27 December 1986 (age 39) Cooma, New South Wales
- Height: 5 ft 4 in (163 cm)

Sport
- Country: Australia
- Sport: Snowboarding
- Coached by: Ben Bright
Medal record
Women's snowboarding
Representing Australia
Olympic Games
Gold medal – first place	2010 Vancouver	Halfpipe
Silver medal – second place	2014 Sochi	Halfpipe
Winter X Games
Gold medal – first place	2007 Aspen	Superpipe
Gold medal – first place	2009 Aspen	Superpipe
Silver medal – second place	2006 Aspen	Superpipe
Silver medal – second place	2008 Aspen	Superpipe
Bronze medal – third place	2015 Aspen	Superpipe
World Championships
Bronze medal – third place	2013 Stoneham	Slopestyle

Torah Jane Bright OAM (born 27 December 1986) is an Australian former professional snowboarder. She is Australia's second most successful Winter Olympian, former Olympic gold and silver medalist, two time X Games gold medalist, three time US Open winner, two time Global Open Champion, three time World Superpipe Champion, former TTR World Champion and recipient of the Best Female Action Sports Athlete at the ESPY awards. In 2014 Bright became the first Olympic athlete (male or female) to qualify for all three snowboarding disciplines; halfpipe, slopestyle and boarder-cross.

== Early life ==
Bright was born in Cooma, New South Wales on 27 December 1986, to parents Peter and Marion Bright; she is the fourth of five siblings. Her parents named her "Torah" after her sister Rowena learned from her Jewish piano teacher that the name referred to the Jewish name for the first five books of the Tanakh and meant "bearer of a great spiritual message" and suggested the name for her new sister.

Bright grew up in Cooma, New South Wales and attended Cooma North Public School at the base of the Snowy Mountains. She started out as a downhill ski racer.

Bright's brother, Ben, is also a professional snowboarder and was her coach. Her older sister, Rowena, competed in the 2002 Salt Lake City Olympics in alpine skiing.

== Career ==
Bright uses a goofy stance.

Bright finished 30th overall at the 2005 World Championships in Whistler, Canada and was runner-up for the World Cup title during the 2003–04 season.

Bright entered only three World Cup events during the 2004–05 season, both in February at the 2006 Winter Olympic venue of Bardonecchia. She placed third in both events, qualifying for the Australian Olympic team.

In 2006, Bright earned a silver medal at the Winter X Games in Aspen, Colorado. She returned the following year, winning the gold medal in the women's superpipe event. She is the first Australian snowboarder to ever win gold at the Winter X Games (11), beating Winter Olympic medalists Gretchen Bleiler and Hannah Teter.

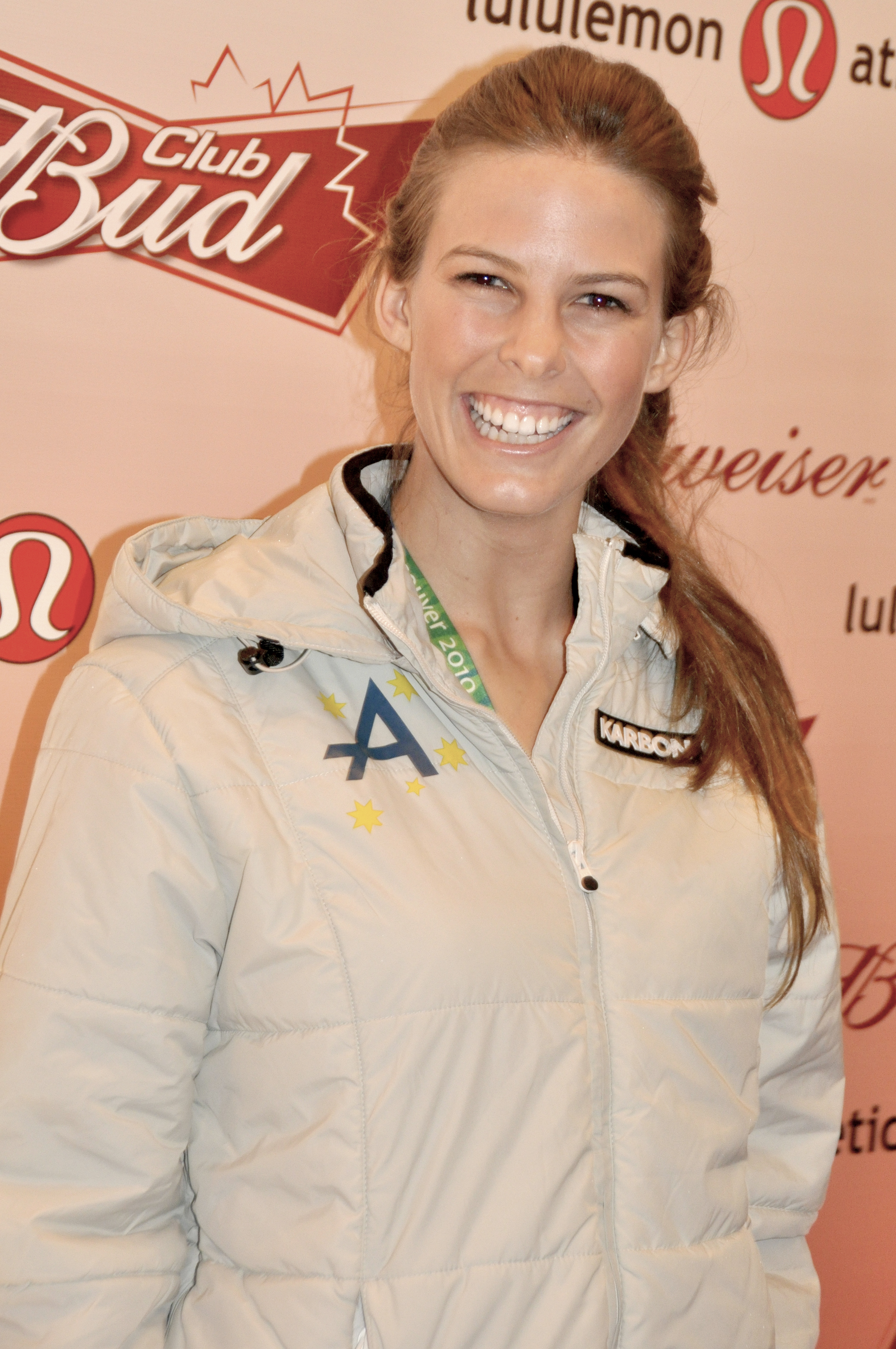
Bright during the 2010 Winter Olympics

In 2007, Bright took first at the Nissan X-Trail Nippon Open in the women's halfpipe, giving her back-to-back wins in two consecutive competitions. At the 2007 World Super Pipe Championships in Park City, Utah, Bright won first place, beating 2002 Olympic gold medalist Kelly Clark. In late 2007, she made the podium for both events in the Roxy Chicken Jam, the final event in the TTR (Ticket to Ride) Snowboard Tour, where she became the 2007 TTR world champion.

In 2010, at the Winter Olympics at Vancouver, Bright was chosen to carry the flag for Australia at the opening ceremonies, and qualified for the no. 1 spot for the final of the women's halfpipe, despite suffering two concussions beforehand in training. Crashing out in her first run in the final, Bright was the first competitor to make a second run. With a successful second run, she posted a score of 45.0, which remained the highest score through the field's second run. Bright became the fourth Australian to win a Winter Olympics gold medal.

In 2013 at the Winter X Games XVII in Aspen, Colorado, Bright came in fourth in the superpipe behind medalists Kelly Clark, Elena Hight, and Arielle Gold.

In 2014 at the Winter Olympics at Sochi, having entered an unprecedented triple of slopestyle, halfpipe, and boarder-cross, Bright finished 7th in the inaugural women's slopestyle final and went on to win silver with a score of 91.50 in the women's halfpipe. This was Australia's first medal at the 2014 Winter Olympics. The medal also saw Bright surpass Alisa Camplin to become Australia's most successful female Winter Olympics athlete.

Bright was a participant in the fourteenth season of Dancing with the Stars.

In 2020 Bright appeared in the documentary film Out of Bounds, snowboarding some of the most extreme reaches of the planet: "I came out of the journey totally inspired by nature and people. There are so many people who do care and are doing their part to create awareness and change. There is a shift in consciousness and it's a beautiful thing to witness."

Bright rarely entered competition after the 2014 Olympics, and suffered a wrist fracture after returning to competition 2 months before the 2018 Olympics. She officially announced her retirement from competition in January 2020.

In 2025, she was inducted into Sport Australia Hall of Fame as athlete member.

== Endorsements ==
Bright has a lifelong sponsorship with Rhythm Snowsports, located in her home town Cooma. She also has a head-to-toe sponsorship with Roxy, the female-specific brand of action-sports company Quiksilver. For the 2008–09 season, she worked to expand her career into design, working on a new addition to the Roxy's women's line, dubbed the "Bright Series," which includes her snowboard, the Roxy Eminence. Her other sponsors include Subway and Boost Mobile.

=== Olympic Winter Games ===
As of 24 February 2026

Year	Age	Halfpipe	Slopestyle	Snowboard cross
(Italy) 2006 Turin	19	5	–	–
(Canada) 2010 Vancouver	23	1	–	–
(Russia) 2014 Sochi	27	2	7	18

=== World Championships ===
As of 24 February 2026

Year	Age	Halfpipe	Slopestyle	Snowboard cross
(Canada) 2005 Whistler	18	30	–	–
(Canada) 2013 Stoneham	26	–	3	–
(Austria) 2015 Kreischberg	28	6	–	–

=== World Cup results by season ===
As of 24 February 2026

Season	Halfpipe					Slopestyle (Note: Slopestyle debuted as a World Cup event in the 2011–12 season.)					Snowboard cross					Overall (Note: Overall placings were given across all disciplines until end of 2010 season. Award for overall park & pipe was given from 2011 season onwards.)	
Season	Events	Wins	Podiums	Points	Rank	Events	Wins	Podiums	Points	Rank	Events	Wins	Podiums	Points	Rank	Points	Rank
2004	5	1	4	3,700	2nd place, silver medalist(s)	–					–						
2005	2	0	2	1,200	15	–					–						
2009	2	0	0	800	26	–					–					800	76
2010	1	1	1	1,000	16	–					–					1,000	56
2013	3	1	1	1,650	7	1	0	0	–	–	4	0	0	300	29	1650	7
2014	1	0	0	–	–	2	0	0	410	24	2	0	0	710	18	410	49
2018	2	0	0	480	22	–					–					480	60
Total	15	3	8	–	–	3	0	0	–	–	6	0	0	–	–	–	–

=== X-games ===
Edition	Place	Event
Winter X Games XI	1st place, gold medalist(s)	Halfpipe
Winter X Games XII	1st place, gold medalist(s)	Halfpipe
Winter X Games XIII	1st place, gold medalist(s)	Superpipe

=== Other competitions/awards ===
Competition	Podiums	Events
Roxy Chicken Jam	4	(silver) : 2004 HP, 2007 HP; (bronze) : 2005 SS, 2007 SS
Arctic Challenge	1	(gold) : 2004 HP
US Open	5	(gold) : 2006 HP, 2008 SP; (silver) : 2005 HP, 2007 SS; (bronze) : 2007 HP
Nippon Open	3	(gold) : 2005 HP, 2007 HP, 2008 SP
World Superpipe Championships	3	(gold) : 2006, 2007, 2008 SP
Vans Cup	1	(gold) : 2006 HP
New Zealand Open	1	(gold) : 2007 HP; 4th: 2007 SS
Winter Dew Tour	2	(gold) : 2009 SP, 2013 SP
Burton Global Open Series	2	(gold) : 2007, 2008
TTR World Snowboard Tour	2	(gold) : 2007; (silver) : 2008

== Personal life ==
Bright is a member of the Church of Jesus Christ of Latter-day Saints.

Bright was married to American pro snowboarder Jake Welch from 2010 to 2013.

Bright married snowboarder Angus Thomson in September 2015. The couple has two sons, born in July 2020 and May 2023, and a daughter born in August 2025.
