= Sarah Burke =

Canadian freeskier (1982–2012)

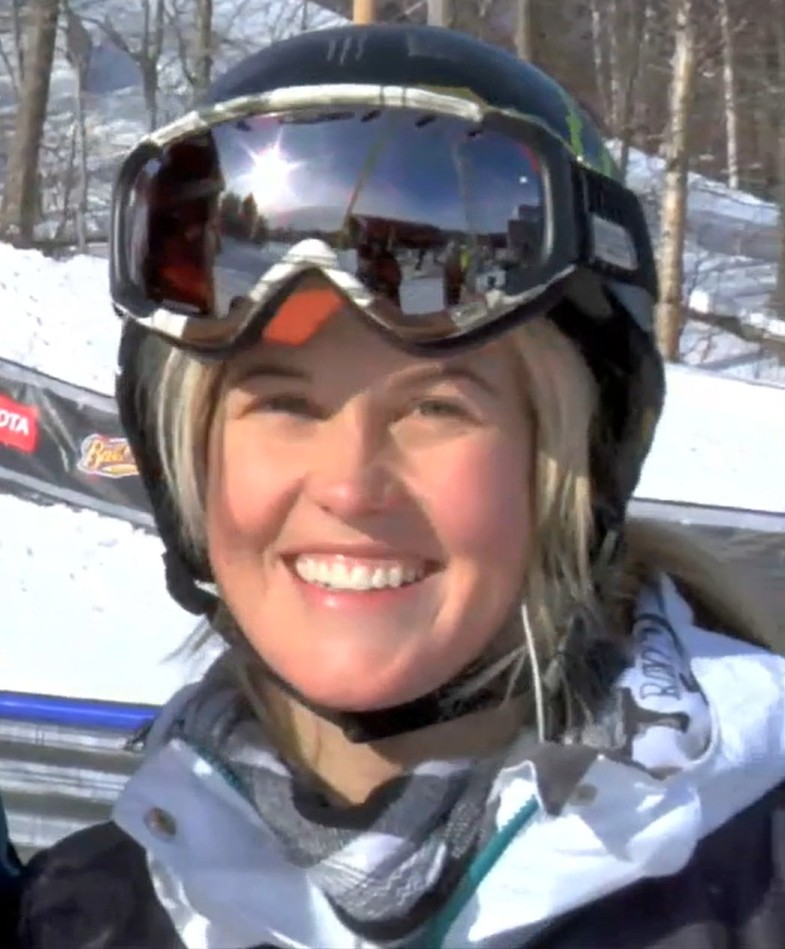
- Burke in 2009

Personal information
- Born: Sarah Jean Burke; September 3, 1982 Barrie, Ontario, Canada
- Died: January 19, 2012 (aged 29) Salt Lake City, Utah, US
- Spouse: Rory Bushfield (m. 2010)
- Website: sarahburkefoundation.com

Sport
- Country: Canada
Medal record
Women's freestyle skiing
Representing Canada
FIS Freestyle World Ski Championships
Gold medal – first place	2005 Ruka	Halfpipe
Winter X Games
Gold medal – first place	2007 Aspen	Superpipe
Gold medal – first place	2008 Aspen	Superpipe
Gold medal – first place	2009 Aspen	Superpipe
Gold medal – first place	2011 Aspen	Superpipe
Gold medal – first place	2011 Tignes	Superpipe
Silver medal – second place	2005 Aspen	Superpipe

Sarah Jean Burke (September 3, 1982 – January 19, 2012) was a Canadian freestyle skier who was a pioneer of the superpipe event. She was a five-time Winter X Games gold medallist, and won the world championship in the halfpipe in 2005. She successfully lobbied the International Olympic Committee (IOC) to have the event added to the Olympic program for the 2014 Winter Olympics. She was considered a medal favourite in the event. Burke died following a training accident in Utah in 2012.

== Early life ==
Burke was born in Barrie, Ontario, to Jan Phelan and Gordon Burke, both artists. She and her sister, Anna Phelan, grew up in Midland and attended Midland Secondary School. Sarah graduated from Howe Sound Secondary School in Squamish, BC, attending its Alternate Program that allowed a flexible schedule to pursue athletics - a program co-founded in the 1980s by Rod Thompson, father of Brody and Marielle Thompson, X Games and Olympic champion.

== Skiing career ==
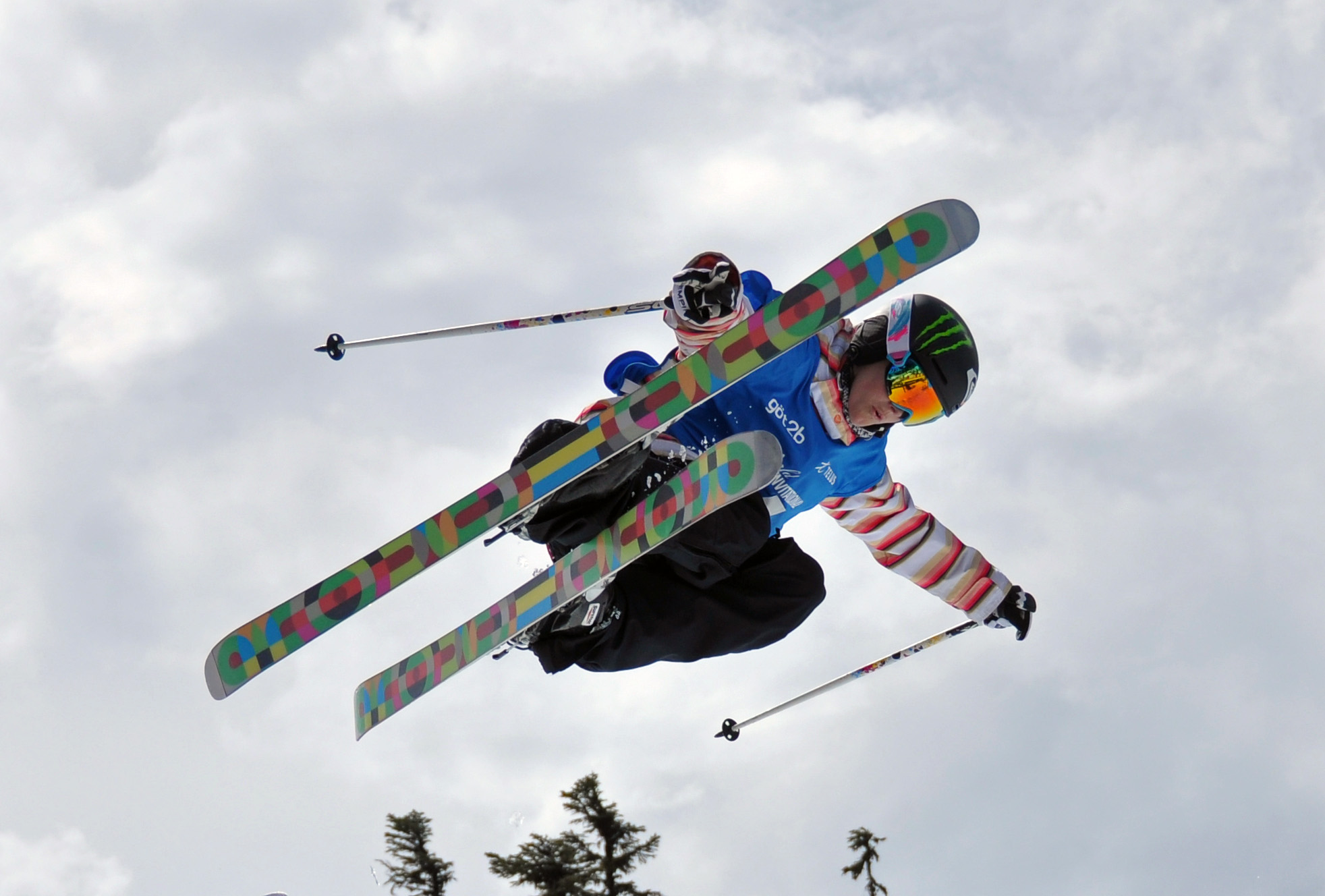
Burke in 2010

As a teenage mogul skier, Burke would often sneak onto the snowboard halfpipe at the end of the day. She was considered a pioneer in the sport of superpipe skiing, along with American Kristi Leskinen. The pair were frequent competitors, and often against male skiers.

Burke won first place in the 2001 US Freeskiing Open in the half-pipe event and finished second in slopestyle. She and Leskinen were the only women who competed against the men. In 2004, Burke lobbied ESPN to include a division for women skiers at its Winter X Games. In 2005, ESPN added women's freeskiing to the X-Games.

When half-pipe made its debut at the 2005 FIS Freestyle World Ski Championships, she emerged as the first world champion. Burke is also a four-time Winter X Games gold medallist in freestyle skiing. She was the first woman ever to land a jump with 1080-degree rotation in competition.

She won ESPN's 2001 Award for female skier of the year and was voted 2007's Best Female Action Sports Athlete at the ESPY awards.

She regularly participated in skiing films, including Propaganda, in which she showcased her skills by sliding rainbow rails, spinning a 540 in the pipe and throwing back-flips.

Burke was a known promoter of the superpipe skiing event, working to have it added to the Olympic program. She failed to have the event added in time for the 2010 Winter Olympics in Vancouver, but successfully lobbied the International Olympic Committee to have the slopestyle and halfpipe events added for the 2014 Sochi Games. Two years ahead of the games, she was considered a potential favourite for the gold medal in Sochi.

== Personal life ==
Burke met freeskier Rory Bushfield when she was 14 at a ski camp in Whistler, British Columbia. On September 25, 2010, she married Bushfield in Pemberton, British Columbia, with pro skier Luke Van Valin officiating the wedding. She and Bushfield resided in Squamish, British Columbia.

== Accident and death ==
On January 10, 2012, Burke was seriously injured while training on the Park City Mountain Resort Eagle superpipe in Park City, Utah. This is the same superpipe where snowboarder Kevin Pearce was seriously injured in 2009. Onlookers reported that Burke had completed a trick fairly well yet fell onto her head, and the accident did not appear to be very severe. Moments later, however, she went into cardiac arrest while still on the ski slope. She was resuscitated and airlifted to the University of Utah Hospital in Salt Lake City, where she was reported to have been placed in a medically induced coma. The following day, she underwent neurosurgery to repair a tear in a vertebral artery. She died of her injuries on January 19, 2012.

According to her publicist, Burke's injuries had resulted in "irreversible damage to her brain due to lack of oxygen and blood after cardiac arrest." Her organs and tissues were donated as she requested before her death.

Because the event at which she fell was unsanctioned and hosted by Burke's sponsor Monster Energy, Burke was not covered under the insurance policy that applied to her when she competed for the Canada Freestyle Ski Association. The day after Burke's death, her agent established a website to raise $550,000 to help pay her estimated $200,000 hospital costs and create "a foundation to honour Sarah's legacy and promote the ideals she valued and embodied."

On February 23, 2014, Burke's ashes were spread in the mountains over Sochi, Russia, during the 2014 Olympic Games. Her former coach, Trennon Paynter, spread them on the highest point at Rosa Khutor complex, and in the halfpipe.

== Legacy ==
In 2006, Burke was inducted into the Midland Sports Hall of Fame.

On June 12, 2012, the Canadian Olympic Committee announced that Burke was inducted into the 2012 Canadian Olympic Hall of Fame for her role in advocating ski halfpipe's inclusion in the Olympic program.

Rory Bushfield and Burke's family started the Sarah Burke Foundation in 2012 to aid young winter athletes with monetary scholarships; seven scholarship recipients competed at the 2022 Beijing Winter Olympics.

In 2014, Burke was posthumously inducted into the Canada's Sports Hall of Fame.

In February 2014, Canada Post produced commemorative stamps honouring Burke, curler Sandra Schmirler and figure skater Barbara Ann Scott for being "pioneers of winter sports".

Burke was honoured on National Flag of Canada Day on February 15, 2014. The flag was then given to Burke's family as a tribute to her legacy.

At the 2014 Winter Olympics in Sochi, Russia, the IOC refused permission for snowboarder Torah Bright to wear a tribute sticker to Burke during the Games. Before the finals of halfpipe started, the event volunteers paid tribute to Burke by skiing in a heart-shaped formation.

In March 2014, the Government of Ontario announced that it would dedicate Highway 93 in memory of her and name it as the Sarah Burke Memorial Highway. The route extends entirely within Simcoe County with its southern terminus near Barrie, Ontario, her birthplace.

On October 17, 2016, Burke was part of the class inducted into the Ontario Sports Hall of Fame at the Sheraton Centre Toronto Hotel.

On October 21, 2022, Burke was inducted into the Springwater Sports Hall of Fame.
