= Chad's Gap =

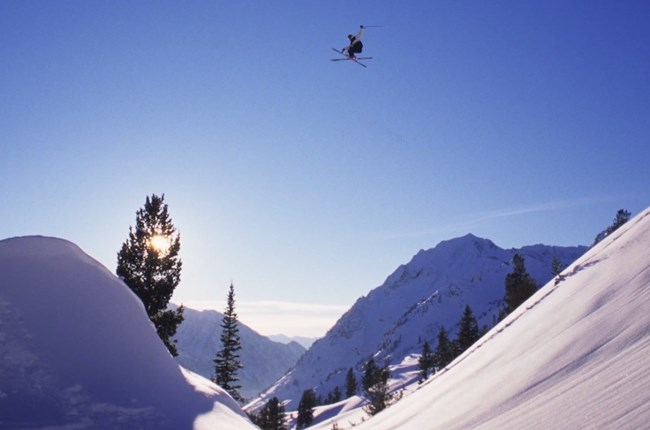
- Candide Thovex clearing Chad's Gap, January 1999
- Interactive map of Chad's Gap

Third Approach
- Location: Grizzly Gulch, Little Cottonwood Canyon, Salt Lake County, Utah; United States
- Range: Wasatch Range
- Coordinates: 40.596029°N 111.621132°W

Chad's Gap is a 120-foot (37 m) backcountry gap located in the Wasatch Mountains, approximately 0.6 miles (0.97 km) northeast of Alta Ski Area, in northern Utah, United States. One version of the structure's discovery has it that Chad Zurinskas, a local Utah resident after whom the gap was purportedly named, discovered it as a gap between two piles of mine tailings in 1999 and arranged with filmmaker Kris Ostness to make the first successful jump. The first successful jump was done by Candide Thovex. Tanner Hall, also known as 'Ski Boss', blew both his ankles to pieces by coming up short on the gap. He recalled it to feel like someone had loaded his ski boots with dynamite. His exclamation, "My ankles are broken, my ankles are broke", has become famous in the snow sports world.

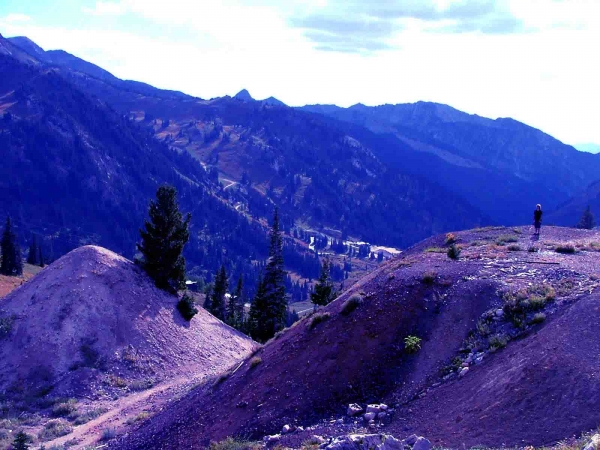
Chad's Gap in summer
