= Levi LaVallee =

American snowmobile racer (born 1982)

Medal record

Men's snowmobile

Representing the United States

Winter X Games
| Gold medal – first place | 2004 Aspen | HillCross |
| Gold medal – first place | 2008 Aspen | Freestyle |
| Gold medal – first place | 2008 Aspen | Speed & Style |
| Gold medal – first place | 2010 Aspen | Knock Out |
| Gold medal – first place | 2013 Aspen | Freestyle |
| Gold medal – first place | 2013 Aspen | Speed & Style |
| Gold medal – first place | 2014 Aspen | Long Jump |
| Silver medal – second place | 2009 Aspen | Speed & Style |
| Silver medal – second place | 2009 Aspen | Best Trick |
| Silver medal – second place | 2018 Aspen | Speed & Style |
| Silver medal – second place | 2018 Aspen | Freestyle |
| Bronze medal – third place | 2010 Aspen | Best Trick |
| Bronze medal – third place | 2017 Aspen | Freestyle |

Levi LaVallee (born August 31, 1982) is an American snowmobile racer.

He won the Winter X Games VIII HillCross gold medal in 2004. At Winter X Games XII in 2008, LaVallee won gold in the Snowmobile Speed and Style event. During Winter X Games XIII in 2009, LaVallee attempted the first double back flip in a competition. Although he was successful in completing two rotations, he failed to ride out his record setting stunt.

LaVallee won a bronze medal in Snowmobile Best Trick at Winter X Games XIV.

On Friday December 17, 2010 Lavallee suffered a broken pelvis, and punctured lung during a practice run for Red Bull New Year No Limits, and was unable to make his record setting attempt during the planned special New Years telecast. However, during a previous practice session leading up to the event Levi managed to land a record setting 361 foot jump shattering the old record of 301 1/2 feet. Since the official event for the attempt did not take place the practice run has been submitted for the official world record title.

On December 31, 2011 Lavallee jumped across San Diego Bay as part of Red Bull New Year No Limits, just over one year after he was injured in a training run preparing for the same event. Lavallee set a world record during his jump of 412 ft.

LaVallee resides in Longville, Minnesota.
