= Charles Gagnier =

Canadian freestyle skier

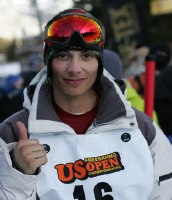

Personal information
- Born: July 19, 1985 (age 40) Victoriaville, Quebec

Sport
- Country: Canada
- Sport: Freestyle skiing
- Event: Slopestyle
Medal record
Men's freestyle skiing
Representing Canada
Winter X Games
Gold medal – first place	2005 Aspen	Slopestyle
Silver medal – second place	2006 Aspen	Big Air
Silver medal – second place	2008 Aspen	Big Air

Charles Gagnier (born July 19, 1985 in Victoriaville, Quebec) is a Canadian freeskier, best known for inventing the Octograb in 2006.

== Career ==
Gagnier began skiing with his family at Canada's Mont-Sainte-Anne resort. He started his competitive career as an alpine ski racer in Quebec, Canada before switching to freestyle skiing. He credits his brother Antoine for pushing him towards freeskiing, introducing him to twin tips at age 15. Gagnier's first major competitive freestyle skiing win was in the U.S. Freeskiing Open Big Air Invitational at Copper Mountain in Frisco, Colorado. He won Gold in Men's Ski Slopestyle at the 2005 Winter X Games IX in Aspen, Colorado. At the 2006 Winter X Games X, he placed second in the Men's Ski Big Air event to T.J. Schiller, and at the 2008 Winter X Games XII, he again placed second in the Men's Ski Big Air event to Jon Olsson. In 2012 and 2013, he won the Slopestyle ski event at Red Bull Playstreets.

== Personal life ==
Gagnier has two brothers, Antoine and Vincent.
