= Winter X Games IX =

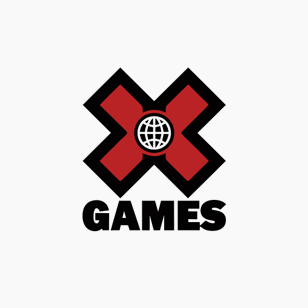

Winter X Games IX were held from January 29, 2005, to February 1, 2005, in Aspen, Colorado. They were the 4th consecutive Winter X Games to be held in Aspen. Television coverage of Winter X Games XI was broadcast on ESPN and ABC, primarily hosted by Sal Masekela and Todd Harris.

== Disciplines ==
Disciplines at the 9th Winter X Games were:

- Freestyle Skiing
- Motocross
- Snowboarding
- Snowmobiling
- Ultracross

== Results ==
=== Motocross ===
Men's Best Trick

Place	Athlete	Score
Gold	Brian Deegan	93.00
Silver	Jeff Kargola	92.20
Bronze	Dustin Miller	91.60

=== Skiing ===
Men's Ski Cross

Place	Athlete	Time
Gold	Reggie Crist
Silver	Zach Crist
Bronze	Enak Gavaggio

Women's Ski Cross

Place	Athlete	Time
Gold	Sanna Tidstrand	55.097
Silver	Karin Huttary	55.385
Bronze	Magdalena Jonsson	55.662

Men's Ski Slopestyle

Place	Athlete	Score
Gold	Charles Gagnier	92.66
Silver	Tanner Hall	91.00
Bronze	Jon Olsson	87.00

Men's Ski SuperPipe

Place	Athlete	Score
Gold	Simon Dumont	92.66
Silver	Tanner Hall	91.00
Bronze	Jon Olsson	87.00

Women's Ski SuperPipe

Place	Athlete
Gold	Grete Eliassen
Silver	Sarah Burke
Bronze	Kristi Leskinen

=== Snowboarding ===
Men's Snowboard Cross

Place	Athlete	Time
Gold	Xavier de le Rue
Silver	Seth Wescott
Bronze	Marco Huser

Women's Snowboard Cross

Place	Athlete	Time
Gold	Lindsey Jacobellis	1:01.102
Silver	Erin Simmons
Bronze	Karine Ruby

Men's Snowboard Slopestyle

Place	Athlete	Score
Gold	Shaun White	93.00
Silver	Danny Kass	90.33
Bronze	Travis Rice	87.00

Women's Snowboard Slopestyle

Place	Athlete	Score
Gold	Janna Meyen	91.33
Silver	Silvia Mittermueller	86.00
Bronze	Natasza Zurek	80.33

Men's Snowboard SuperPipe

Place	Athlete	Score
Gold	Antti Autti	93.00
Silver	Andy Finch	92.00
Bronze	Danny Kass	90.33

Women's Snowboard SuperPipe

Place	Athlete	Score
Gold	Gretchen Bleiler	89.00
Silver	Doriane Vidal	88.00
Bronze	Hannah Teter	86.66

=== Snowmobiling ===
Snocross

Place	Athlete
Gold	Blair Morgan
Silver	Tucker Hibbert
Bronze	Steven Martin

=== Ultracross ===
Men's Combined Ultracross

Place	Athlete
Gold	Marco Huser/Eric Andersson
Silver	Xavier de le Rue/Davey Barr
Bronze	Nate Holland/Eric Archer
