= Winter X Games XIII =

2009 winter sports event in Aspen, Colorado

Winter X Games XIII (Winter X Games Thirteen)
- Location: (United States) Aspen, Colorado
- Dates: January 22–25

Winter X Games XIII were held from January 22 to January 25, 2009 in Aspen, Colorado. They were the 8th consecutive Winter X Games to be held in Aspen. The events were broadcast on ESPN and ABC.

The 13th games introduced the X Games' current theme song: a remix of Peter Gabriel's "Games Without Frontiers" featuring Lord Jamar.

== Disciplines ==
The following were the events at Winter X Games 13.

- Skiing
- Snowboarding
- Snowmobiling

== Results ==
=== Skiing ===
Men's Monoski Cross

Place	Athlete
Gold	Tyler Walker
Silver	Sam Ferguson
Bronze	Kees-Jan van der Klooster

Men's Ski SlopeStyle

Place	Athlete
Gold	T.J. Schiller
Silver	Sammy Carlson
Bronze	Colby West

Men's Skier X

Place	Athlete
Gold	Stanley Hayer
Silver	Hiroomi Takizawa
Bronze	Andreas Steffen

Men's Ski Superpipe

Place	Athlete
Gold	Xavier Bertoni
Silver	Tanner Hall
Bronze	Simon Dumont

Men's Ski Big Air

Place	Athlete
Gold	Simon Dumont
Silver	Jon Olsson
Bronze	Jacob Wester
Bronze	P.K. Hunder

Women's Skier X

Place	Athlete
Gold	Ophelie David
Silver	Magdalena Jonsson
Bronze	Sasa Faric

Women's Ski Superpipe

Place	Athlete
Gold	Sarah Burke
Silver	Jen Hudak
Bronze	Jess Cumming

Women's Ski SlopeStyle

Place	Athlete
Gold	Anna Segal
Silver	Grete Eliassen
Bronze	Kaya Turski

=== Snowboarding ===
Men's Snowboard Superpipe

Place	Athlete
Gold	Shaun White
Silver	Kevin Pearce
Bronze	Antti Autti

Men's Snowboard Big Air

Place	Athlete
Gold	Travis Rice
Silver	Torstein Horgmo

Men's Snowboard SlopeStyle

Place	Athlete
Gold	Shaun White
Silver	Scotty Lago
Bronze	Mikkel Bang

Men's Snowboarder X

Place	Athlete
Gold	Nate Holland
Silver	Graham Watanabe
Bronze	Stian Sivertzen

Women's Snowboard Superpipe

Place	Athlete
Gold	Torah Bright
Silver	Kelly Clark
Bronze	Hannah Teter

Women's Snowboard SlopeStyle

Place	Athlete
Gold	Jenny Jones
Silver	Spencer O'Brien
Bronze	Megan Ginter

Women's Snowboarder X

Place	Athlete
Gold	Lindsey Jacobellis
Silver	Helene Olafsen
Bronze	Sandra Frei

=== Snowmobiling ===
Men's Snowmobile Freestyle

Place	Athlete
Gold	Joe Parsons
Silver	Justin Hoyer
Bronze	Daniel Bodin

Men's Snowmobile SnoCross

Place	Athlete
Gold	Tucker Hibbert
Silver	Robbie Malinoski
Bronze	Dan Ebert

Men's Snowmobile Speed & Style

Place	Athlete
Gold	Joe Parsons
Silver	Levi LaVallee
Bronze	Cory Davis

Men's Snowmobile Best Trick

Place	Athlete
Gold	Dane Ferguson
Silver	Jimmy Fejes
Silver	Joe Parsons
Silver	Levi LaVallee
