= Snow Blind (film) =

- Directed by: Christopher J. Scott
- Produced by: David Schiavone; Christopher J. Scott; Chris Volckmann
- Starring: Hannah Teter; JJ Thomas; Brent Meyer; Rob Bak; Jeff Meyer
- Distributed by: Matson Films
- Release date: December 8, 2006
- Running time: 100 minutes
- Country: United States
- Language: English

Snow Blind is a 2006 documentary film about the history, culture, and lifestyle of snowboarding. Shot over the season of 2004–2005, the film covers the origins of snowboarding, the evolution of it into an Olympic sport and the passionate participants, thrill seekers and competitors.

The film was released on December 8, 2006. It was filmed on location in Colorado and Utah and shot entirely in HD.

== Synopsis ==
The film is segmented into six major thematic sections:

- Inventors: The individuals who started creating snowboards
- Pioneers: The individuals who started riding snowboards before it was a sport
- Back Country: The individuals who risk their lives riding in non-designated snowboarding areas
- Pros: The teen and twenty-something professional athletes and Olympians
- Adaptors: The individuals who have lost limbs or their eyesight but continue to snowboard
- Families: Interviews the Teters and how snowboarding has influenced their lives

The film also has one mini section on Banana George, a 93-year-old snowboarder.

== Subjects ==
- Hannah Teter
- Abe Teter
- JJ Thomas
- Brent Meyer
- Jeff Meyer
- Rob Bak
- Ross Powers
- Jeff Cormak
- Steve Fisher
- Louie Vito
- Steve Hayes
- Tina Basich
- Banana George

== Music ==
- The Prodigy
- The Donnas
- Orbital
- Carl Cox
- Roni Size
- GZA
