= Hannah Teter =

American snowboarder (born 1987)

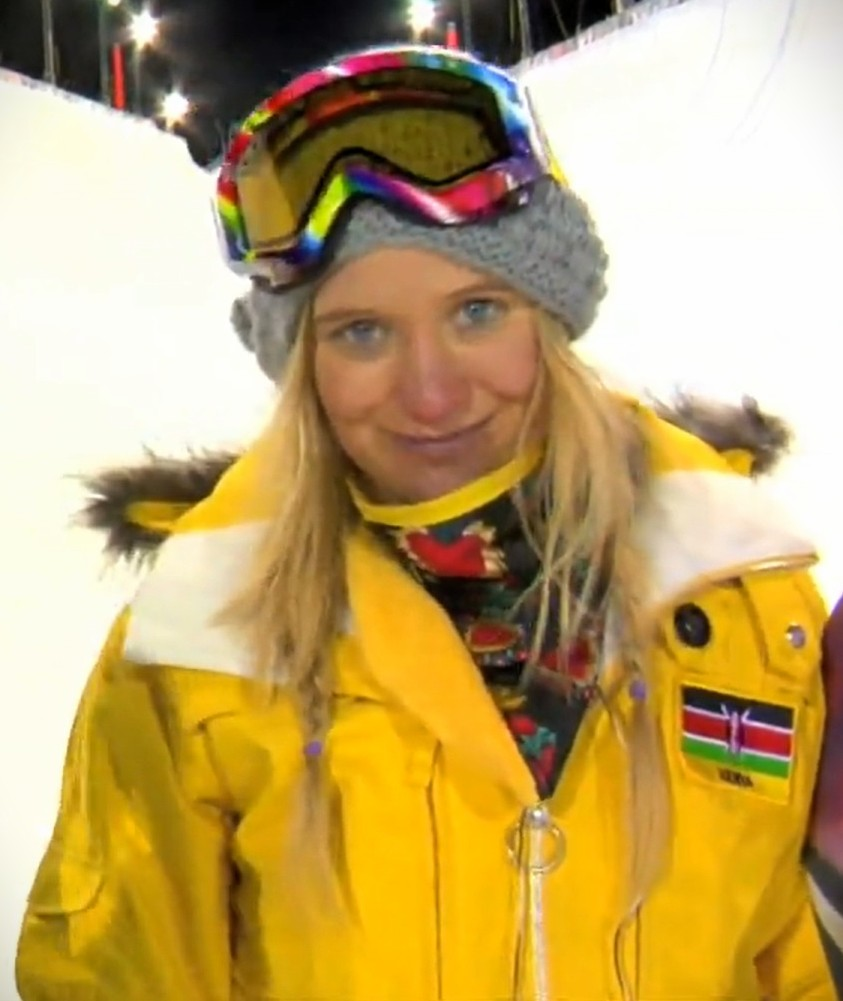
- Teter in 2009

Personal information
- Born: January 27, 1987 (age 39) Belmont, Vermont, U.S.
- Height: 5 ft 7 in (170 cm)
- Website: HannahTeter.com

Sport
- Country: United States
- Club: Sierra-at-Tahoe
- Coached by: Elijah Teter
Medal record
Women's snowboarding
Representing the United States
Olympic Games
Gold medal – first place	2006 Turin	Halfpipe
Silver medal – second place	2010 Vancouver	Halfpipe
World Championships
Bronze medal – third place	2005 Whistler	Halfpipe
Winter X Games
Gold medal – first place	2004 Aspen	Superpipe
Silver medal – second place	2017 Aspen	Dual slalom
Silver medal – second place	2018 Aspen	Dual slalom
Bronze medal – third place	2003 Aspen	Superpipe
Bronze medal – third place	2005 Aspen	Superpipe
Bronze medal – third place	2009 Aspen	Superpipe
Bronze medal – third place	2010 Aspen	Superpipe
Bronze medal – third place	2012 Aspen	Superpipe
Bronze medal – third place	2016 Aspen	Dual Slalom

Hannah Teter (born January 27, 1987) is an American snowboarder. She won the gold medal in the halfpipe at the 2006 Winter Olympic Games in Torino and silver at the 2010 Winter Olympic Games in Vancouver. She has also won bronze at the 2005 FIS World Championships at Whistler, British Columbia, and has a total of six World Cup victories in her career.

== Early life and career ==
Born into a snowboarding family in Belmont, Vermont, Teter is the youngest of five siblings. Two of her four older brothers, Abe and Elijah, competed for the US Snowboard team, and her eldest brother Amen is their agent and manager. Both of the Teter parents, Jeff and Pat, were skiers, but have since been converted to snowboarding by their children.

Teter started snowboarding at the age of 8, taking her first lesson at her home mountain of Okemo. She is an Okemo Mountain School graduate. By 2002 at the age of 15, she was the World Junior Halfpipe Champion, and had begun riding on the FIS Snowboard World Cup circuit. Teter achieved a 4th-place finish in her first World Cup halfpipe event at Valle Nevado, Chile, in September of that year.

Teter became vegetarian after watching the film Earthlings, and credits her plant-based diet as taking her to a "whole other level" as an athlete.

== Professional career ==
From 2002–2004 Teter competed in seven World Cup events with four victories, at Sapporo in 2003 and 2004, Valle Nevado in 2003, and at Saas-Fee in 2004. Competing at the Winter X Games, Teter won bronze in 2003, and gold in 2004.

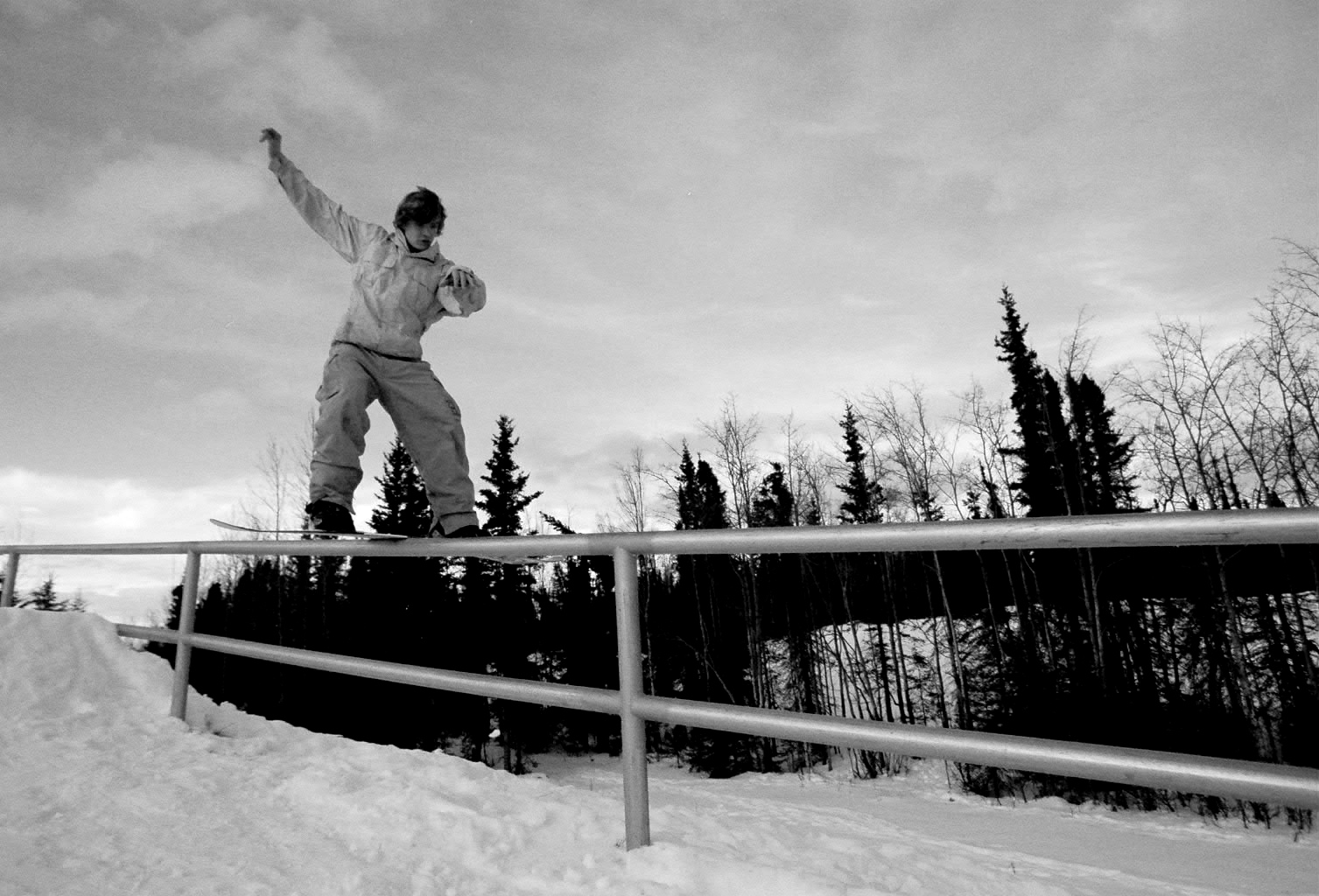
Teter in October 2005

In 2005, Teter reached the podium with a third-place finish at her first FIS World Championships, and added two more World Cup victories at Valle Nevado. Teter also earned another Winter X Games bronze in 2005. During 2005 Teter was hampered by a knee injury which required two surgeries; in her words: "there was a chunk of bone that had separated and it was kind of dangling around."

At the 2006 Winter Olympic Games in Turin, Teter was unsure how well she would be able to perform because of that injury. However, she went on to win the Olympic gold medal in halfpipe, beating out US teammate and friend Gretchen Bleiler, who won silver. Teter's accomplishment was rewarded further by the United States Olympic Committee who named her the USOC SportsWoman of the Year. She also won the ESPY Award for Best Action Sports Female in 2006.

After the 2006 Winter Games, Teter spent time focusing on humanitarian causes, but returned to the World Cup circuit in 2009. Since returning from hiatus she has taken the podium at two World Cup events and the 2009 Winter X Games, as well as a victory at the 2009 Lake Tahoe Grand Prix. At Grand Prix events held on January 22–23, 2010, at Park City, Teter had two second-place finishes. The performance locked up her spot for the 2010 Winter Olympics in Vancouver. Following the Park City GP, Teter announced that she would donate her $10,000 winnings for the weekend to a humanitarian relief fund to aid survivors of the 2010 Haiti earthquake.

At the 2010 Winter Olympic Games in Vancouver, Teter scored 45.4 in the qualification round for the women's halfpipe, the second place score, earning her a bye to the finals. After the first run of the finals, Teter was in first place with a score of 42.4. In the second run, Teter's earlier score was topped by Australian Torah Bright, who scored 45.0, a mark Teter was unable to beat in her second run. Teter finished with the silver medal. Fellow American Kelly Clark won the bronze medal.

Teter finished fourth at the 2014 Sochi Winter Olympics in the Halfpipe event. She was fifth among US athletes in qualifying for the 2018 Winter Olympics in Pyeongchang and did not make the Olympic team.

== Media and business ventures ==
Before going to Turin for the 2006 Olympics, Teter was featured in the 2005 documentary film about the growth of snowboarding, First Descent. The movie, which was filmed in the mountains of Alaska, starred Teter alongside snowboarding legends including Shaun White and Terje Håkonsen. A short behind the scenes documentary titled AK and Beyond was made at the same time, also featuring Teter.

Teter and her brother Abe were also featured in the 2006 documentary Snow Blind about the history of snowboarding and its evolution into an Olympic sport.

In 2009, Vermont based ice cream company Ben & Jerry's created a new flavor in honor of their fellow Vermonter; Hannah Teter's Maple Blondie.

Teter was one of four Winter Olympic athletes chosen to model for the 2010 Sports Illustrated Swimsuit Issue, in an "Olympic Stars" section of the popular annual magazine. Teter's photo shoot took place at Whistler Blackcomb, the venue for several events of the Vancouver Olympic Games. Teter joined fellow snowboarder Clair Bidez, and skiers Lacy Schnoor and Lindsey Vonn who also modeled for the issue. While Teter and the other athletes received some criticism for participating in the photo spread, she responded to her critics saying: "I don't believe in the criminalization of bodies and women having to be ashamed of their bodies. That's just so wrong."

In 2013, Teter published an instructional snowboarding book entitled, Mastering Snowboarding, along with co-author Tawnya Schultz.

In February 2020, Teter became Global Ambassador for British snow apparel brand Oneskee.

== Charity work and philanthropy ==
In 2008 Teter founded a charity called Hannah's Gold which raises money through the sales of Vermont maple syrup. The charity, in partnership with World Vision, helps to support the village of Kirindon, Kenya through building schools, digging fresh water wells, and providing water filtration. In 2009 Teter donated all of her prize money to the Kirindon program. That same year, she posed in an ad campaign for PETA, protesting the Canadian seal hunt.

In 2014, Teter was named a Global Ambassador for Special Olympics. She says she is inspired by her brother, Josh, who has intellectual disabilities.

== Other titles, awards and honors ==
- 2009 Gold medal at the Burton Australian Open
- 2009 Gold medal at the US Snowboarding Grand Prix in Boreal
- 2006 Winter Gravity Games Silver medalist, women's halfpipe
- 2005 Vans Cup champion
- 2005 US Open bronze medalist
- 2005 Nippon Open silver medalist
- 2005 Winter Gravity Games silver medalist
- 2004 Finalist for the ESPY Awards for Best Female Action Sport Athlete
- 2004 US Snowboard Grand Prix halfpipe champion
- 2004 NASJA "Competitor of the Year" title and award
- 2003 Vans Triple Crown halfpipe title + silver in slopestyle
- 2003 Became youngest member of the US Snowboarding Team
- 2002 First Female Snowboarder to land a 900 in Competition
