= Jon Olsson =

Swedish freestyle skier (born 1982)

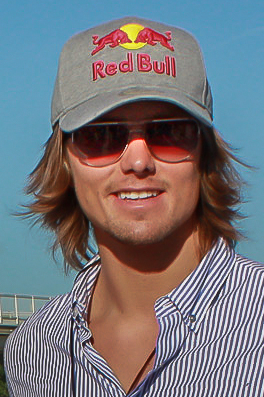
- Olsson in May 2011

Personal information
- Full name: Jon Anders Olsson
- Born: Jon Anders Olsson; 17 August 1982 (age 43) Mora, Sweden
- Height: 1.8 m (5 ft 11 in)

Skiing career
- Sport: Alpine skiing
- Club: IFK Mora
- Disciplines: Giant slalom
- World Cup debut: 11 December 2010 (age 28)

World Cup
- Seasons: 2
- Wins: 0
- Podiums: 0
- Overall titles: 0
- Discipline titles: 0

Jon Anders Olsson (born 17 August 1982) is a former professional freeskier and alpine ski racer from Sweden. Born in Mora, Olsson started his career as a ski racer but at age 16 he switched his race skis for twin tips and quit ski racing. Eight years later, after a 50 000 SEK (US$5826.22) bet with fellow skier Jens Byggmark, Olsson started ski racing again with the goal of the bets being to make it to the Olympics in 2014. He now competes in both freestyle and ski racing. Olsson is known for his invention of several new double flips, including a D-spin 720 into a flatspin 540 (DJ flip), a switch double rodeo 1080 (hexo flip), a double flatspin 900 (kangaroo flip), and a switch cork 720 to flatspin 540 (the tornado).

Most of the years between 2005 and 2015, Olsson hosted the big air event Jon Olsson Invitational, also known as JOI. In 2007, the event was voted best big air event by freeskier magazine. From 2007 to 2010, he also hosted Jon Olsson Super Sessions (JOSS), a freeskiing film contest that takes place in Åre, Sweden. The event consisted of teams of skiers skiing for approximately two weeks with a film crew and creating a short ski film. Olsson made his debut in the Alpine Skiing World Cup in Val-d'Isère in December 2010, as part of a plan to make the Swedish alpine ski team at the 2014 Winter Olympics. Hans Olsson, a Swedish alpine skier specialising in the speed events, is Jon Olsson's brother.

Jon Olsson
Medal record

Men's freestyle skiing

Representing Sweden

X Games
Gold medal – first place	2002 Aspen	Superpipe
Gold medal – first place	2008 Aspen	Big air
Silver medal – second place	2004 Aspen	Superpipe
Silver medal – second place	2009 Aspen	Big air
Bronze medal – third place	2002 Aspen	Slopestyle
Bronze medal – third place	2003 Aspen	Slopestyle
Bronze medal – third place	2003 Aspen	Superpipe
Bronze medal – third place	2004 Aspen	Slopestyle
Bronze medal – third place	2005 Aspen	Superpipe
Bronze medal – third place	2005 Aspen	Slopestyle
Bronze medal – third place	2008 Aspen	Slopestyle

== Personal life ==
Olsson began dating Janni Delér in 2012. They became engaged in November 2017, and were married in June 2018 in Marbella. The couple had a child named Leon in November 2019. In November 2020, the couple announced they were expecting their second child. Their daughter, Leia, was born in March 2021. They announced their separation in August 2022. Olsson shares his life through social media, documenting his day-to-day adventures through YouTube vlogs. In his vlogs, Olsson travels the world with his wife and his cameraman-editor Benjamin Ortega. Jon married the Norwegian influencer Annette Haga in June 2025.

== Business career ==
A part from his skiing career and YouTube channel, Olsson has been involved in multiple business ventures.

In 2009, Olsson co-founded a bag company first called Douchebags, later rebranded to Db, together with Truls Braatas. They met while surfing in Hoddevik, Norway and recognized a gap in the market for high-quality travel gear tailored to action sports. In 2012, they launched their first product, The Snowroller and gained immediate recognition for its innovative design, winning awards such as the ISPO Award in 2014. In 2024, LVMH Luxury Ventures invested in Db.

In 2018, Olsson also co-founded a clothing company known as C'est Normal, that he in 2024 sold his shares in.

== Skiing career ==
Olsson holds eleven Winter X-Games podiums.

== Results ==
- 2011 1st Clash of the Nations, Big Air
- 2010 5th King of Style, big air, Stockholm, Sweden
- 2010 8th Budapest Fridge Festival, Budapest, Hun
- 2010 2nd Relentless Freeze Festival, London
- 2010 10th Freestyle.ch, big air, Zurich, SUI
- 2009 5th JOSS Team Sweden
- 2009 2nd X-Games, big air, Aspen, US
- 2008 3rd X-Games, slopestyle, Aspen, US
- 2008 1st X-Games, big air, Aspen, US
- 2007 1st Icer Air, big air, San Francisco, US
- 2007 1st Ski and Snowboard Festival, big air, Whistler, Canada
- 2007 1st US Freeskiing Open, slopestyle, Copper Mountain, US
- 2006 1st Jon Olsson Delér Invitational, big air, Åre, Sweden
- 2006 1st Ski and Snowboard Festival, big air, Whistler, Canada
- 2005 1st World Superpipe Champion, Park City, US
- 2005 4th Jon Olsson Delér Invitational, big air, Åre, Sweden
- 2005 3rd X-Games, superpipe, Aspen, US
- 2005 3rd X-Games, slopestyle, Aspen, US
- 2005 3rd US Freeskiing Open, slopestyle, Vail, US
- 2005 5th US Freeskiing Open, big air, Vail, US
- 2004 2nd Rip Curl, slopestyle, Saas Fee, Switzerland
- 2004 3rd Rip Curl, Halfpipe, Saas Fee, Switzerland
- 2004 1st Scandinavian Championships, Big Mountain, Riksgränsen, Sweden
- 2004 1st Nokia Totally Board, big air, Greece
- 2004 1st Ski and Snowboard Festival, big air, Whistler, Canada
- 2004 3rd US Freeskiing Open, big air, Vail, US
- 2004 2nd X-Games, superpipe, Aspen, US
- 2004 3rd X-Games, slopestyle, Aspen, US
- 2003 2nd Cape TownTotally Board, Nokia, big air
- 2003 1st Rip Curl, Total, Saas Fee, Switzerland
- 2003 1st Rip Curl, big air, Saas Fee, Switzerland
- 2003 3rd Rip Curl, Halfpipe, Saas Fee, Switzerland
- 2003 2nd Rip Curl, slopestyle, Saas Fee, Switzerland
- 2003 1st Air we go, big air, Oslo, Norway
- 2003 2nd King of the Globe, Stockholm, Sweden
- 2003 2nd Freestyle.ch, Zürich, Switzerland
- 2003 1st Ski and Snowboard Festival, big air, Whistler, Canada
- 2003 1st Ski and Rock, slopestyle, Sälen, Sweden
- 2003 1st Red Bull Big Air, Åre, Sweden
- 2003 2nd US Freeskiing Open, slopestyle, Vail, US
- 2003 4th US Freeskiing Open, superpipe, Vail, US
- 2003 3rd X-Games, superpipe, Aspen, US
- 2003 3rd X-Games, slopestyle, Aspen, US
- 2002 1st X-Games, superpipe, Aspen, US
- 2002 3rd X-Games, slopestyle, Aspen, US
- 1999 1st The Jump, big air, Åre, Sweden
