= Gretchen Bleiler =

American snowboarder

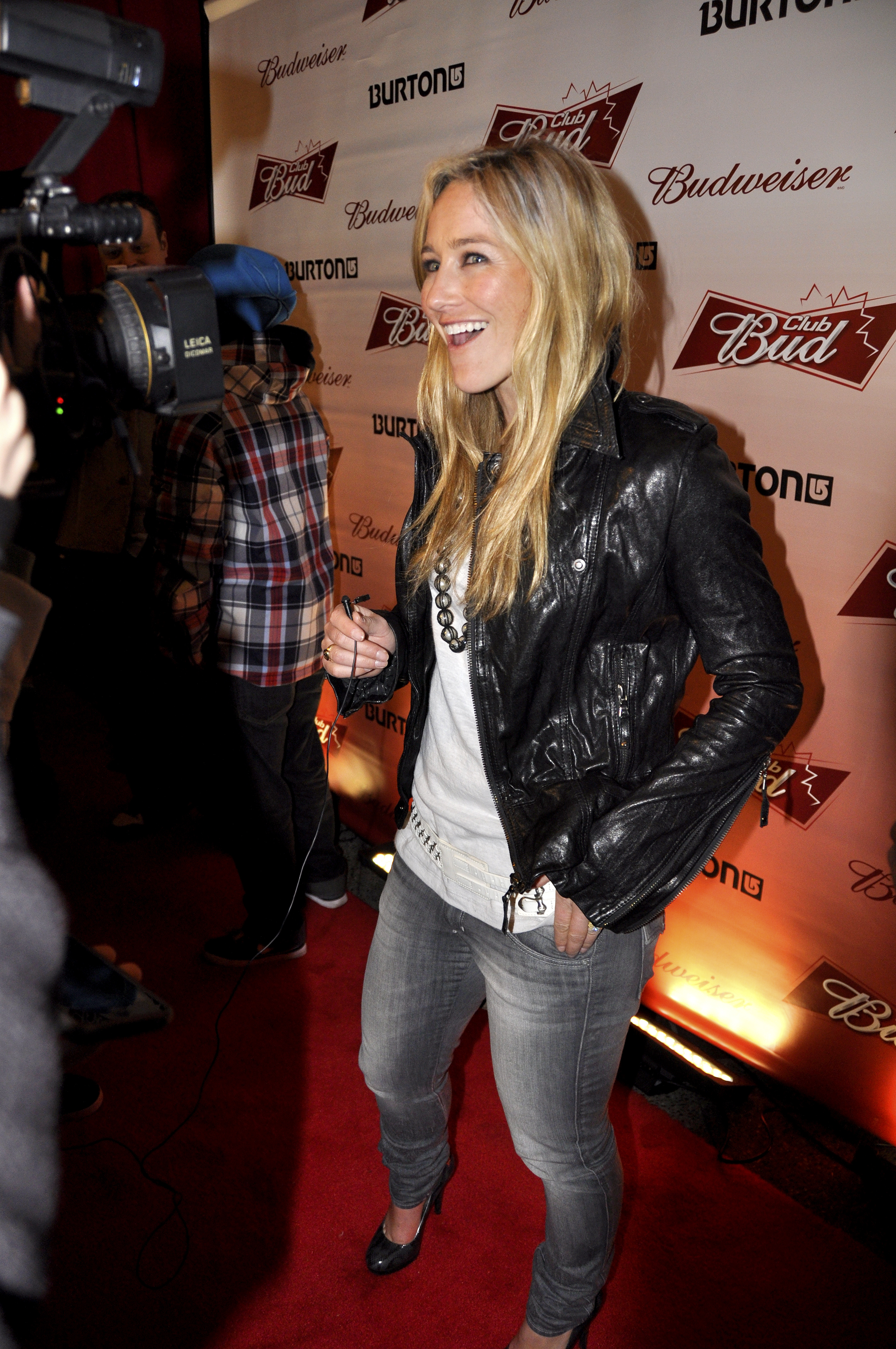

Personal information
- Born: Gretchen Elisabeth Bleiler; April 10, 1981 (age 45) Toledo, Ohio, U.S.
- Height: 5 ft 5 in (165 cm)
- Weight: 126 lb (57 kg)

Sport
- Country: United States
- Sport: Snowboarding
Medal record
Olympic Games
Silver medal – second place	2006 Turin	Halfpipe
Winter Dew Tour
Gold medal – first place	2009 Mt. Snow	Superpipe
Gold medal – first place	2008 Breckenridge	Superpipe
Winter X Games
Gold medal – first place	2003 Aspen	Superpipe
Gold medal – first place	2005 Aspen	Superpipe
Gold medal – first place	2008 Aspen	Superpipe
Gold medal – first place	2010 Aspen	Superpipe
Silver medal – second place	2007 Aspen	Superpipe
New Zealand Winter Games
Bronze medal – third place	2013 Cardrona	Halfpipe

Gretchen Elisabeth Bleiler (born April 10, 1981) is an American former professional halfpipe snowboarder. She won a silver medal at the 2006 Olympics.

== Career ==
Born in Toledo, Ohio, Bleiler aspired to compete in the Winter X Games from a very young age, and found her passion in snowboarding at age 11 (1992). She has been riding ever since and became professional in 1996. Among her accomplishments, she jump-started the invert revolution for female riders as the first to land a Crippler 540 in competition, and won more halfpipe competitions in 2003, 2005 and 2006 than any other female snowboarder. In the pre-Olympic season she won four of the five US Olympic halfpipe qualifiers and is also a four-time X Games gold medalist, most recently winning the superpipe at Winter X Games XIV.

In 2003, she was a U.S. snowboard Grand Prix champion, a U.S. Open of snowboarding champion, and a Triple Crown of Snowboarding champion.

She posed for the February 2004 issue of FHM, along with fellow snowboarder Tara Dakides and sportscaster Jamie Little.

Bleiler, who missed qualifying for the 2002 Winter Olympics due to a tiebreaker, won a silver medal in the women's halfpipe at the 2006 Winter Olympics in Turin, Italy.

Starting in 2007, Bleiler expanded her career into snowboard and outerwear design, through Oakley and K2 Snowboarding, designing her own signature outerwear line for Oakley, and participating in the K2 Alliance, which develops and tests women's products, as well as working on the graphics for several K2 Boards. In 2008, she helped to create a new all-female invitational superpipe competition at Snowmass called the Snow Angels Invitational.

While competing in the Vancouver 2010 Winter Olympics, many considered Bleiler a gold medal favorite. However, she fell on both of her final runs, and took 11th place.

During the summer, Gretchen Bleiler coaches and mentors youth at High Cascade Snowboard Camp. In 2008, 2010, and 2014 she was awarded a Signature Session at High Cascade.

Bleiler announced her retirement in January 2014 after being injured in a 2012 training accident and failing to make the 2014 Winter Olympics team. She is currently pursuing speaking, writing, teaching, activism and being an entrepreneur; she is an owner of ALEX Bottle (which stands for "Always Live EXtraordinarily") with her husband Chris.

=== Career highlights ===
- 2010 X Games Superpipe Gold Medalist
- 2008 Winter Dew Tour Superpipe Champion (Breckenridge, Co)
- 2008 X Games Halfpipe Gold Medalist
- 2006 FIS World Cup 1st Place, Saas Fe, Switzerland
- 2006 Olympic silver medalist
- 2006 Overall Grand Prix Champion; won four of the five Grand Prix events determining Olympic team
- 2005 X Games and Gravity Games Gold Medalist
- 2005 US Open Halfpipe Champion
- FIS World Cup 1st Place, Bardonecchia, Italy
- Eight straight wins in 2003
- 2003 X Games Halfpipe Gold Medalist
- 2003 US Open Champion
- Won 2003 Overall Grand Prix Title
- One of only four females invited to coveted 2003 Arctic Challenge
- 2002 and 2003 Vans Triple Crown Overall Title Winner
- Won 2003 World SuperPipe Championships

=== Awards ===
- Voted 2006 Female Snowboarder of the Year at FUEL TV's inaugural Action Sports Awards
- Nominated for 2006 ESPY Award
- Won 2004 Colorado Female Athlete of the Year Award
- Earned Transworld Snowboarding's Reader's Choice Award in 2004
- Nominated for 2004 Laureus "Female Action Sports Athlete" Award
- Named Snowboarder and Transworld Snowboarding 2003 "Female Rider of the Year"
- Nominated for 2009 Teen Choice Awards "Other Action Sports Athlete – Female"

== Personal life ==
Bleiler enjoys surfing, mountain biking, interior design and fashion. She is also active in several environmental organizations, including the Aspen Snomass Save Snow campaign, and stopglobalwarming.org.

She lives in Aspen, Colorado and is married to Chris Hotell.
