= Superpipe =

Halfpipe structure used in acrobatic sports

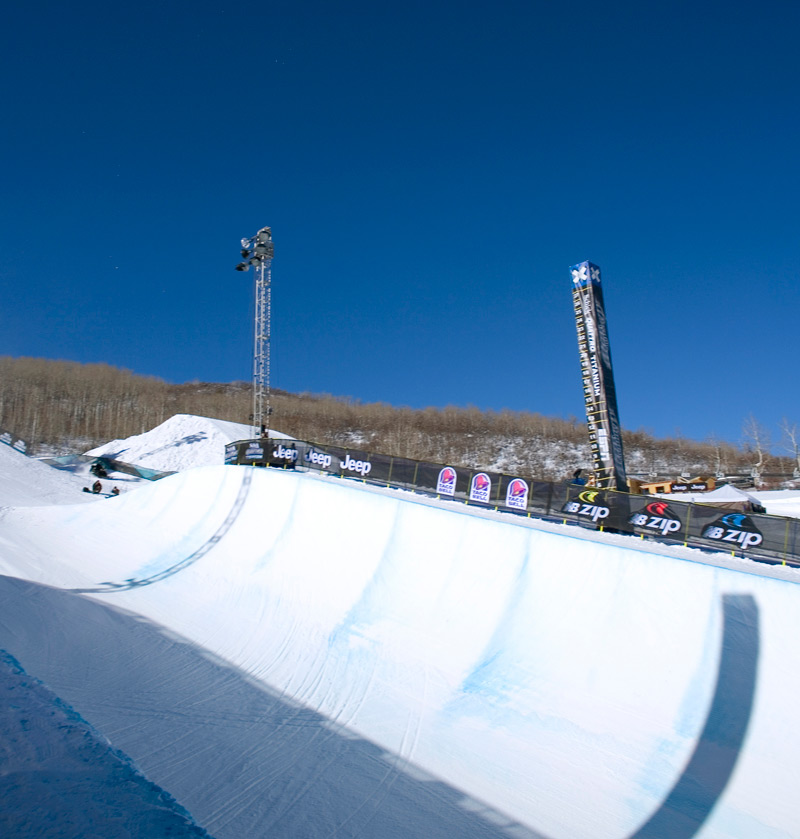
Side view of a superpipe

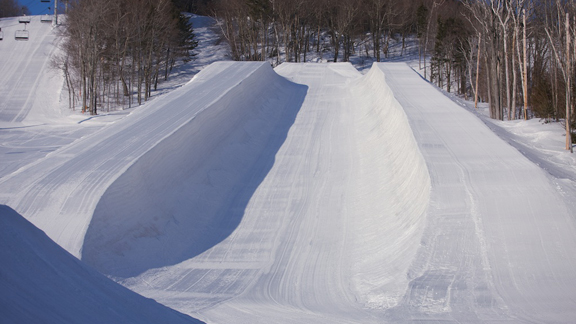
Front view of a superpipe

A superpipe is a large halfpipe structure used in extreme sports, primarily snowboarding and freestyle skiing.

== Overview ==
For winter sports, the term superpipe is used to describe a halfpipe built of snow which has walls 22 ft (6.7 m) high from the flat bottom on both sides. Other features of a superpipe are that the width of the pipe is greater than the height of the walls, and the walls extend to near vertical. In the International Ski and Snowboard Federation (FIS) Snowboard World Cup rules, the recommended width for 22 ft (6.7 m) walls is 64 ft (20 m).

The term superpipe has evolved over the years as the size of halfpipes has grown. Originally, 18 ft (5.5 m) halfpipes were known as superpipes, but during the early 2000s, major competition organizers listened to rider feedback and began constructing 22' halfpipes for competitions. These became known as superpipes, and the 18' halfpipes they replaced are now known as standard halfpipes. The 22' wall size has proved very popular with athletes.

The length of a superpipe ranges from 400 ft (120 m) to 600 ft (180 m), depending on available terrain and construction funding. All halfpipes require extensive grooming by specialized equipment. In contrast, a natural snow halfpipe can be cleaned by a normal snow groomer. Because of the high expense of constructing and maintaining them, there are not that many halfpipes in the world, and very few true superpipes. During the 2013–2014 northern-hemisphere winter, only fourteen 22' superpipes existed globally.

While 22' superpipes are standard for all major competitions, many ski resorts have halfpipes ranging in size from 12 ft (3.7 m) to 18 ft (5.5 m). 18' is the most popular size globally for halfpipes.

At the 1998 Olympics in Nagano, Japan, snowboarding made its debut as an Olympic event with halfpipe utilizing superpipes for competitions. Halfpipe and giant slalom served as the original two disciplines. At the 2014 Winter Games, the freestyle skiing program introduced superpipe competitions alongside slopestyle.
