= Mountain Dew Amp =

Energy drink brand

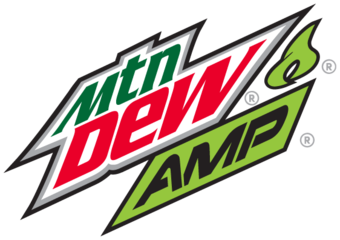
- Product type: Energy drink
- Current owner: PepsiCo
- Country: U.S.
- Introduced: 2001; 25 years ago
- Related brands: Mountain Dew
- Website: www.mountaindew.com/product/mtn-dew-amp-original

Mountain Dew Amp (or simply Amp) is an energy drink brand produced by PepsiCo. At the time of its introduction in 2001, Amp Energy was initially distributed under the Mountain Dew soft drink brand. Beginning in 2009, it was produced and labeled under its own stand-alone trademark name, but in 2018, reverted to using Mountain Dew branding. The beverage is packaged in both cans of 16 and 24 US fluid ounces (473 and 710 mL), and is sold in the United States, Canada, the United Kingdom and Lebanon. In 2009, Amp Energy was the number four energy drink brand in the U.S. in terms of overall retail sales.

== Flavors ==
The original formulation of Amp Energy was positioned as a flavor extension of the Mountain Dew brand, and in 2001 its label read "Amp Energy Drink from Mountain Dew". In 2008, the label design was changed to contract the product name to a more concise "Amp Energy", with the Mountain Dew logo being shifted to the lower portion of the cans. In Amp's 2011 redesign, the Mountain Dew logo was taken off the cans completely. According to beverage industry commentators at the time, this labeling update was enacted with the intent of "placing a stronger emphasis on the 'Amp Energy' brand and less on its Mountain Dew roots". Amp Energy Original contains taurine, B-vitamins, guarana, ginseng and maltodextrin. 8.4 fluid ounces of Amp contains 74 milligrams of caffeine.

The Amp Energy product line has since expanded to a broader range of flavors and variants, which as of 2011 included Amp Energy (Original), Sugar Free, Overdrive (cherry), Relaunch (discontinued) (orange), Elevate (mixed berry), Traction (grape), Green Tea, Lightning (lemonade) and Sugar Free Lightning, and watermelon. Traction has since been renamed to Boost. There was also a limited edition flavor named Tradin Paint which was an Orange/Lime/Berry drink. In February 2010 a new series of juices was launched under the name Amp Energy Juices, which are made with B-vitamins, taurine, ginseng and guarana. These juices are produced in two flavors: Orange and Mixed Berry, and are packaged in 12-ounce bottles. Also introduced at this time was Amp Energy Gum, which is made from a blend of B-vitamins, taurine and caffeine.

On March 6, 2013, Amp Energy officially announced that it will re-introduce its Orange flavor.

A new line of drinks from the Amp brand was introduced in 2018, titled Mountain Dew Amp Game Fuel, bearing the name of Mountain Dew's former line of Game Fuel drinks. The line features a resealable can lid, and has sponsored several esports communities.

=== UK version ===
An 'Amp' branded citrus-flavoured energy drink distributed by Britvic under license from PepsiCo. launched in the UK in August 2013. The United Kingdom version of Amp Energy is released under the 'Mountain Dew' brand with a UK-unique new logo. This is similar to its early release in North America, with the Amp logo featuring the text 'Powered by Mountain Dew' beneath it. Amp Energy — Powered by Mountain Dew features a higher caffeine content than Mountain Dew Energy at 31 mg/100ml. It also contains real sugar as is common with other UK soft drinks. The drink was discontinued in 2017, in order for Britvic to focus more on the original variety.

== Sponsorship ==
Amp Energy was the title sponsor for the inaugural NHL Winter Classic outdoor game on New Year's Day 2008.

Amp Energy sponsored Kevin Lepage's No. 61 Peak Fitness Racing Ford for the 2006 Daytona 500. In 2008, Amp Energy began sponsoring NASCAR Sprint Cup Series driver Dale Earnhardt Jr. and his No. 88 car. In 2009, Amp Energy released Tradin’ Paint, a limited edition Earnhardt Jr.-themed energy drink which was a combination of three flavors: orange, lime and berry. The product was available in 16-ounce cans and featured the same paint scheme as Hendrick Motorsports’ No. 88 Amp Energy/National Guard Chevrolet. In late 2011, PepsiCo withdrew its Amp Energy sponsorship, replacing it with Diet Mountain Dew.

PepsiCo has sponsored the Talladega Superspeedway race for multiple years, resulting in the race being titled the "Amp Energy 500" in 2008 and 2009, and the "AMP Energy Juice 500" in 2010. In October 2010, Amp Energy Juice produced a short film about Talladega Superspeedway titled The Legend of Hallowdega which starred David Arquette, directed by Terry Gilliam and included appearances by Dale Earnhardt Jr. and Darrell Waltrip. The sponsorship ended in 2011 as the race is now known as the Yellawood 500.

Amp Energy sponsors a snowboard team which includes athletes Mason Aguirre, Keir Dillon, Kevin Pearce, Jack Mitrani, Luke Mitrani and Scotty Lago. In 2009, Amp Energy joined Burton Snowboards to sponsor the 27th Annual US Open Snowboarding Championships at Stratton Mountain in Vermont. Other snowboarding events in which Amp Energy is a primary sponsor include the Burton Am Series, Burton Demo Tour, Burton World Tour, and the Canadian Open Snowboarding Championships.

A 2009 promotion involved graphic designers, musicians and artists creating custom Amp-branded refrigerators which were placed in designers' homes and retail stores that included Crooks and Castles, Rogue Status, Huf Clothing and Reed Space. Designers that participated in the promotion included Topher Chin, Steve Aoki, Omar Epps and Han Cholo. According to Women’s Wear Daily, this initiative was carried out “as part of Pepsi's bid to recast the image of its Amp Energy drink as the beverage of choice for the fashion, art and lifestyle crowd.” In 2010, Amp Energy became the official energy drink of the World Extreme Cagefighting (WEC) series, before the WEC went defunct in the same year. It is also the sponsor of UFC athletes Urijah Faber, Chad Mendes and Joseph Benavidez.
