= Greg Bretz =

American snowboarder (born 1990)

Personal information
- National team: United States
- Born: December 19, 1990 (age 35) Anaheim, California, US
- Home town: Mammoth Lakes, California, US
- Height: 6 ft 2 in (188 cm) (2018)
- Weight: 180 lb (82 kg) (2018)
- Spouse: Meredith Bretz
- Children: 2

Sport
- Country: United States
- Sport: Snowboarding
- Event: Halfpipe

Achievements and titles
- World finals: 1
Medal record
Men's Snowboarding
Representing the United States
Winter X Games
| Bronze medal – third place | 2014 Aspen | Super-pipe |
FIS Snowboard World Cup
| Gold medal – first place | FIS Snowboard World Cup 2008 | Halfpipe |
U.S. Snowboarding Grand Prix
| Gold medal – first place | U.S. Snowboarding Grant Prix 2013 | Halfpipe |
| Gold medal – first place | U.S. Snowboarding Grant Prix 2016 | Halfpipe |
| Bronze medal – third place | U.S. Snowboarding Grant Prix 2018 | Halfpipe |
Dew Tour
| Gold medal – first place | Dew Cup 2013 | Halfpipe |
| Silver medal – second place | Dew Cup 2011 | Halfpipe |

Gregory Bretz (born December 19, 1990) is an American professional snowboarder and two-time Olympian (2010 and 2014). He also won the FIS Snowboard World Cup for halfpipe in 2008 and finished first in the Dew Tour over Shaun White in 2013.

== Early life ==
Bretz was born in Anaheim, California, on December 19, 1990 to Greg Sr. and Allison Bretz, who divorced a few years later. His father sold his machine shop in Orange County around this time, spent two months hiking in the southern Sierra Nevada with his 5-year-old son, and then moved to Mammoth Lakes to take a job working at Mammoth Mountain. Bretz first snowboarded on June Mountain at age 5. Though he lived mainly with his mother in nearby Bishop, he saw his father often and the two developed a close relationship. He played tight end, earning All-CIF honors, and graduated from Mammoth High School in 2009.

== Career ==
Bretz began entering halfpipe competitions at age 11. In 2008, he became the youngest rider on the US Snowboarding men's halfpipe team at the FIS Snowboard World Cup and finished first in Stoneham, Quebec and second overall behind after Iouri Podladtchikov. In January 2010, Bretz finished fourth in the Winter X Games XIV men's super-pipe competition. Within days of this competition, it was announced that he had made the US team alongside Shaun White, Louie Vito, and Scotty Lago for the 2010 Winter Olympics in Vancouver. He finished 12th.

In February 2011, Bretz finished second in the Dew Tour's Snowbasin super-pipe competition after Luke Mitrani. He finished fifth in the men's super-pipe at the 2013 Winter X Games in Aspen. That December, he beat Shaun White for the Dew Cup with a score of 91.40 to 90.40, the first snowboarder in nearly four years to dethrone him. He finished first at the U.S. Snowboarding Grand Prix halfpipe, qualifying him for the Sochi Olympics. Prior to leaving for Russia, he won bronze at the Winter X Games. He placed 12th in the men's half pipe final at the Olympics.

In early 2016, he qualified at #1 for the finals of the US Snowboarding Grand Prix at Park City. He qualified at #1 again the following year at Breckenridge, but the competition was cancelled due to bad weather. At the 2018 competition, he placed third at Mammoth Mountain behind Chase Josey and Ben Ferguson with a score of 81.50. He competed but did not qualify for the 2018 Winter Olympics.

== Personal life ==
In 2010, Bretz was dating fellow Olympic snowboarder Elena Hight. As of 2019, he and his wife Meredith were living in Crested Butte, Colorado with their two children.
