= Snowboarding at the 2010 Winter Olympics – Men's halfpipe =

Men's halfpipe at the XXI Olympic Winter Games
- Venue: Cypress Mountain
- Date: February 17, 2010
- Competitors: 40 from 17 nations
- Winning score: 48.4

Medalists
1st place, gold medalist(s)		Shaun White	United States
2nd place, silver medalist(s)		Peetu Piiroinen	Finland
3rd place, bronze medalist(s)		Scott Lago	United States

Official Video Highlights

The men's halfpipe competition of the Vancouver 2010 Olympics was held at Cypress Mountain on February 17, 2010.

== Summary ==
In each round of competition, each competitor performed two rides through the halfpipe. The highest-scoring run determined whether or not the competitor continued to the next round (or medaled, in the final round). In each round (except for the first run of the qualifying round) the order of performance was based on the inverse order of scoring (i.e., the competitor with the lowest score went first and so forth with the highest-scoring competitor going last).

The first round was the qualifying round, with 40 snowboarders divided into two heats. The top nine scorers from each heat advanced; the top three scorers went straight to the final round while the fourth- through ninth-place scorers went to a semifinal round.

The semifinal round consisted of twelve snowboarders. The top six from that group joined the six top scorers from the qualifying round for the finals.

In the final round, Shaun White had already wrapped up the gold medal performance with his first run (none of the other competitors' second-run scores exceeded White's 46.8 score), but performed his second run anyway, successfully completing a double McTwist 1260 and improving on his initial score.

It is currently the only Olympic halfpipe final to take place at night.

== Results ==
=== Qualification ===
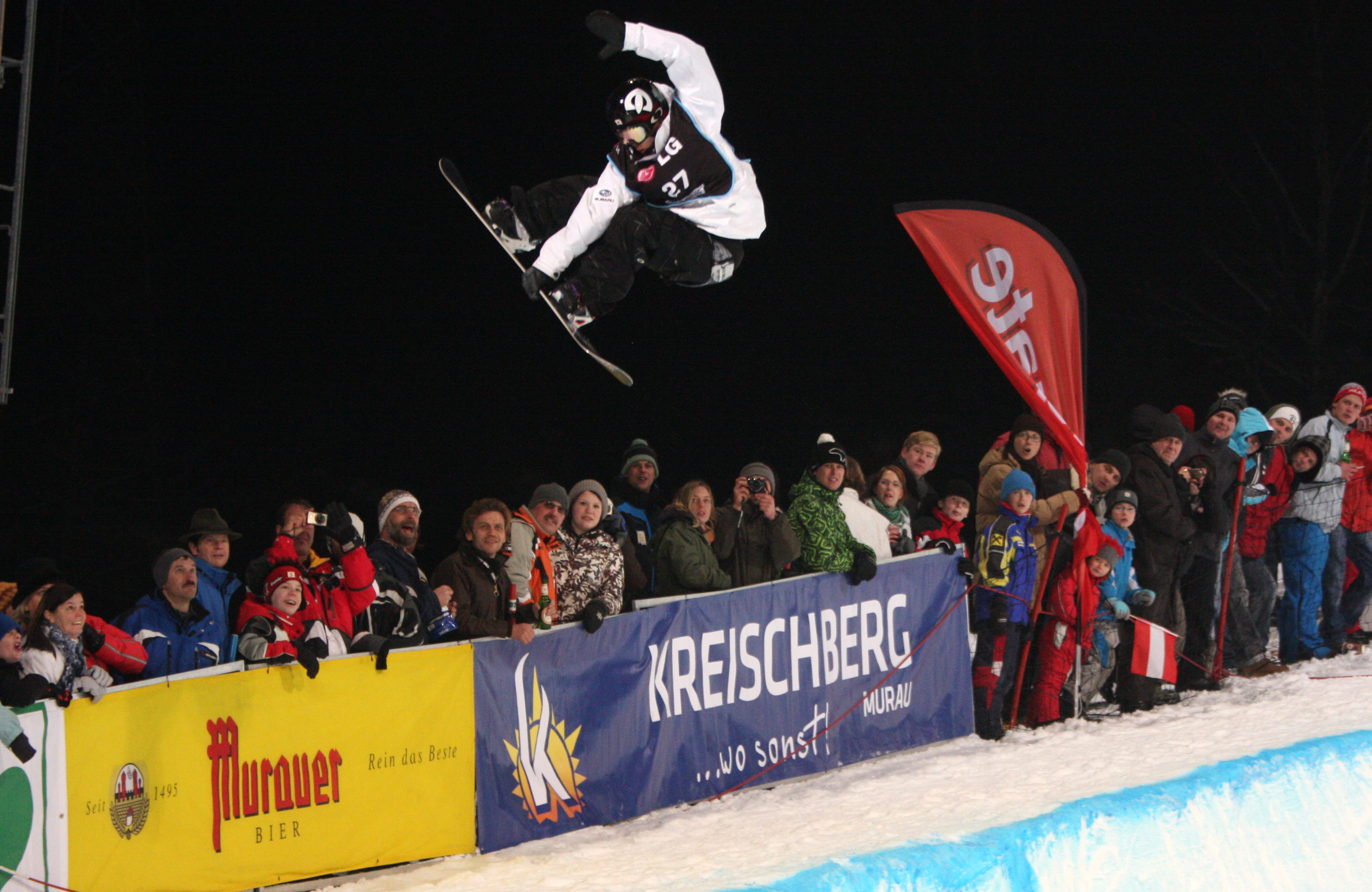
Kohei Kudo

Rank	Heat	Bib	Name	Country	Run 1	Run 2	Best	Notes
1	1	5	Shaun White	United States	45.8	10.8	45.8	QF
2	1	6	Ryō Aono	Japan	33.2	43.1	43.1	QF
3	1	3	Louie Vito	United States	26.1	41.8	41.8	QF
4	1	16	Aluan Ricciardi	France	25.4	37.9	37.9	QS
5	1	1	Zeng Xiaoye	China	14.0	32.8	32.8	QS
6	1	7	Mathieu Crépel	France	32.6	2.5	32.6	QS
7	1	9	Ben Kilner	Great Britain	21.5	32.1	32.1	QS
8	1	2	Gary Zebrowski	France	31.6	18.7	31.6	QS
9	1	14	Ben Mates	Australia	28.3	29.6	29.6	QS
10	1	12	James Hamilton	New Zealand	5.2	28.0	28.0	
11	1	4	Janne Korpi	Finland	26.5	15.6	26.5	
12	1	10	Kim Ho-Jun	South Korea	8.4	25.8	25.8	
13	1	8	Markus Keller	Switzerland	13.6	20.4	20.4	
14	1	15	Ståle Sandbech	Norway	9.1	20.1	20.1	
15	1	11	Rubén Verges	Spain	9.4	19.5	19.5	
16	1	13	Roger S. Kleivdal	Norway	15.7	18.4	18.4	
17	1	19	Christian Haller	Switzerland	8.0	16.0	16.0	
18	1	18	Dolf van der Wal	Netherlands	14.5	11.8	14.5	
19	1	20	Michał Ligocki	Poland	10.8	11.1	11.1	
20	1	17	Manuel Pietropoli	Italy	9.3	5.2	9.3	
1	2	37	Peetu Piiroinen	Finland	44.0	45.1	45.1	QF
2	2	28	Kazuhiro Kokubo	Japan	42.1	42.5	42.5	QF
3	2	27	Iouri Podladtchikov	Switzerland	36.3	41.4	41.4	QF
4	2	34	Greg Bretz	United States	36.2	41.3	41.3	QS
5	2	36	Markku Koski	Finland	39.3	11.9	39.3	QS
6	2	38	Scotty Lago	United States	39.0	28.4	39.0	QS
7	2	30	Kohei Kudo	Japan	3.2	37.1	37.1	QS
8	2	23	Markus Malin	Finland	32.8	36.7	36.7	QS
9	2	26	Justin Lamoureux	Canada	12.6	35.4	35.4	QS
10	2	22	Arthur Longo	France	34.5	32.4	34.5	
11	2	33	Christophe Schmidt	Germany	9.8	32.3	32.3	
12	2	32	Scott James	Australia	7.6	28.2	28.2	
13	2	24	Brad Martin	Canada	11.2	27.5	27.5	
14	2	29	Sergio Berger	Switzerland	7.3	26.2	26.2	
15	2	25	Daisuke Murakami	Japan	15.1	23.5	23.5	
16	2	35	Tore Viken Holvik	Norway	23.1	19.6	23.1	
17	2	21	Jeff Batchelor	Canada	14.9	18.5	18.5	
18	2	39	Mitchell Brown	New Zealand	18.4	15.2	18.4	
19	2	31	Shi Wancheng	China	15.8	18.0	18.0	
	2	40	Fredrik Austbø	Norway	DNS	DNS	DNS	

=== Semifinal ===
Rank	Bib	Name	Country	Run 1	Run 2	Best	Notes
1	23	Markus Malin	Finland	42.9	21.9	42.9	QF
2	34	Greg Bretz	United States	42.1	38.0	42.1	QF
3	38	Scotty Lago	United States	41.3	16.2	41.3	QF
4	7	Mathieu Crépel	France	37.2	22.6	37.2	QF
5	36	Markku Koski	Finland	37.1	12.8	37.1	QF
6	26	Justin Lamoureux	Canada	36.2	20.2	36.2	QF
7	2	Gary Zebrowski	France	20.1	36.1	36.1	
8	30	Kohei Kudo	Japan	30.6	33.5	33.5	
9	16	Aluan Ricciardi	France	33.2	12.8	33.2	
10	1	Zeng Xiaoye	China	32.9	16.2	32.9	
11	14	Ben Mates	Australia	3.6	27.5	27.5	
12	9	Ben Kilner	Great Britain	3.1	17.0	17.0	

=== Final ===
Rank	Bib	Name	Country	Run 1	Run 2	Best
1st place, gold medalist(s)	5	Shaun White	United States	46.8	48.4	48.4
2nd place, silver medalist(s)	37	Peetu Piiroinen	Finland	40.8	45.0	45.0
3rd place, bronze medalist(s)	38	Scotty Lago	United States	42.8	17.5	42.8
4	27	Iouri Podladtchikov	Switzerland	42.4	17.6	42.4
5	3	Louie Vito	United States	39.1	39.4	39.4
6	36	Markku Koski	Finland	36.4	25.0	36.4
7	26	Justin Lamoureux	Canada	33.8	35.9	35.9
8	28	Kazuhiro Kokubo	Japan	30.5	35.7	35.7
9	6	Ryō Aono	Japan	32.9	29.1	32.9
10	7	Mathieu Crépel	France	25.9	8.7	25.9
11	23	Markus Malin	Finland	16.7	18.6	18.6
12	34	Greg Bretz	United States	18.3	13.0	18.3
