= Arielle Gold =

American snowboarder

Personal information
- Full name: Arielle Townsend Gold
- Nicknames: Ron Burgundy, Rel, Relish, Relly Belly
- Born: May 4, 1996 (age 30) Steamboat Springs, Colorado, U.S.
- Home town: Steamboat Springs, Colorado, U.S.
- Education: University of Colorado Boulder
- Height: 5 ft 4 in (163 cm)

Sport
- Sport: Snowboarding
- Event: Halfpipe
- Coached by: Mike Jankowski

Achievements and titles
- Highest world ranking: World champion (2013)
Medal record
Women's snowboarding
Representing USA
| Event | 1st | 2nd | 3rd |
|---|---|---|---|
| Winter Olympics | 0 | 0 | 1 |
| FIS Snowboard World Championships | 1 | 0 | 0 |
| Winter X Games | 0 | 2 | 1 |
| FIS Snowboarding Junior World Championships | 1 | 0 | 0 |
| Winter Youth Olympic Games | 0 | 2 | 0 |
| Total | 2 | 4 | 2 |
Winter Olympics
| Bronze medal – third place | 2018 Pyeongchang | Halfpipe |
FIS Snowboard World Championships
| Gold medal – first place | 2013 Stoneham | Halfpipe |
Winter X Games
| Silver medal – second place | 2016 Aspen | SuperPipe |
| Silver medal – second place | 2018 Aspen | SuperPipe |
| Bronze medal – third place | 2013 Aspen | SuperPipe |
FIS Snowboarding Junior World Championships
| Gold medal – first place | 2012 Sierra Nevada | Halfpipe |
Winter Youth Olympic Games
| Silver medal – second place | 2012 Innsbruck | Halfpipe |
| Silver medal – second place | 2012 Innsbruck | Slopestyle |
- Updated on 13 February 2018

Arielle Townsend Gold (born May 4, 1996) is an American Olympic medalist snowboarder.

In 2012, she won the gold medal in the halfpipe at the FIS Junior Snowboarding World Championships, at the age of 15. The next year, she won the gold medal in the halfpipe at the FIS Snowboarding World Championships 2013, at the age of 16, becoming the second-youngest snowboarder to win a world championship.

She won a bronze medal in the superpipe at the 2013 Winter X Games XVII. In 2014, she was the youngest member of the US Sochi Winter Olympics halfpipe team, at the age of 17. She suffered a separated shoulder right before the Olympics and was unable to compete. Competing for the US in the 2018 Winter Olympics in PyeongChang, South Korea, she won a bronze medal in the women's halfpipe event.

Her older brother is Olympian snowboarder Taylor Gold.

== Personal life ==
Gold is Jewish and was born in Steamboat Springs, Colorado. Her older brother is American Olympian snowboarder Taylor Gold.

She competed in rodeos and horse jumping events before becoming involved in snowboarding. She lives in Steamboat Springs and attended Steamboat Springs High School. She later transferred to the Insight School of Colorado, a full-time online public charter school that allowed her to take her classes online. Gold studied psychology at the University of Colorado Boulder.

Her father Ken Gold, a former professional moguls skier would video each of her practices. The family moved to Breckenridge, Colorado for five months every year to be closer to her competitions.

== Snowboarding career ==
She learned to ski when she was three years old. Her older brother convinced her to switch to snowboarding when she was 7. She said: "Taylor made it look like so much fun". Their father said:

Taylor is, in many ways, responsible for Arielle’s success because he... told her: 'Look, most of the girls do things the way the other girls do. You need to do things the way the guys do. You need to grab your snowboard, you need to go big, you have style, you need to have aggression in your riding.'

She is a member of the Steamboat Springs Winter Sports Club. Her home mountain is Mount Werner in the Park Range of the Rocky Mountains in Colorado, four miles from Steamboat Springs. Gold began competing when she was eight years old.

=== 2010–12: Junior World Champion ===
In 2010, she won the Burton US Open Junior Jam halfpipe contest. In 2011, she won a silver medal at the U.S. Revolution Tour, Copper Mountain, Colorado, United States of America Snowboard and Freeski Association (USASA) National Championships.

In 2012 at the Winter Youth Olympic Games in Innsbruck, Austria, she won silver medals in slopestyle and halfpipe. She won the gold medal in halfpipe at the FIS Junior Snowboarding World Championships in the Sierra Nevada (Spain) at the age of 15. For 2012, she ranked 14th on the World Snowboard Tour.

=== 2013: World Champion ===
She won the gold medal in the halfpipe at the FIS Snowboarding World Championships 2013 in Stoneham-et-Tewkesbury, Quebec, Canada, at the age of 16, the second-youngest ever to win a World Championship. Later that week after replacing the injured Gretchen Bleiler, Gold won a bronze medal in the superpipe at the Winter X Games XVII in Aspen, Colorado.

She won the Burton European Open in Laax, Switzerland, came in second in the 2013 Grand Prix in Park City, Utah in February, and won the bronze medal at X Games Europe in Tignes, France. She ranked second on the 2013 World Snowboard Tour and also earned a place on the U.S. Snowboarding pro team.

=== 2014: Olympian ===
Gold was the youngest member of the US 2014 Sochi Winter Olympics halfpipe team at the age of 17, and was considered a medal contender in the women's halfpipe. She was not able to compete in the qualification for the Olympic halfpipe finals, because of a separated right shoulder injury suffered on February 12, 2014, when she caught an edge at the end of the pipe during a practice run and crashed at Rosa Khutor Extreme Park in Krasnaya Polyana, Russia, moments before the competition.

=== 2015-17 ===
In 2015 she finished second in the Sprint U.S. Grand Prix in Park City, Utah, third in the Burton US Open in Vail, Colorado, and fourth in the X Games in Aspen.

In 2016 she won a silver medal in the X Games in Aspen, and a bronze medal in the X Games in Oslo, Norway.

She was ranked 6th in the 2017 FIS World Cup Halfpipe Standings.

=== 2018: Olympian ===
Competing for the United States in the 2018 Winter Olympics in PyeongChang, South Korea, she won a bronze medal in the women's halfpipe event.

== See also ==
- List of Jewish skiers and snowboarders
- List of Jewish Olympic medalists
