= Danny Davis (snowboarder) =

American snowboarder (born 1988)

Medal record

Men's snowboarding

Representing the United States

Winter X Games
| Gold medal – first place | 2014 Aspen | Superpipe |
| Gold medal – first place | 2015 Aspen | Superpipe |
| Silver medal – second place | 2016 Aspen | Dual Slalom |
| Bronze medal – third place | 2019 Aspen | Superpipe |

Danny Davis (born June 22, 1988, in Highland, Michigan) is a professional snowboarder specializing in halfpipe. He represented the United States at the 2014 Winter Olympics.

== Career ==
He was voted 2006 Rookie of the Year in the Transworld Snowboarding Riders Poll Awards, 2006 Rookie of the Year for Snowboarder Magazine, and 2008 Snowboarder Magazine Top 10 Riders of the Year.

In January 2010 Davis won a snowboard Grand Prix event, but he suffered a back injury in an ATV accident, ending his 2010 season and Olympic aspirations.

In January 2014, Davis was selected to represent the United States at the 2014 Winter Olympics in Sochi, Russia. He competed in the halfpipe event, where he placed 10th.

Davis is a member of the Frends Crew made up of snowboarders Mason Aguirre, Kevin Pearce, Scotty Lago, Keir Dillon, Mikkel Bang, Jack Mitrani, and Luke Mitrani. Frends is a group of riders who turned their initial friendship into a formal alliance in 2007 to move the sport away from a competitive and business focus and return the sport to its grass roots and its collegial beginnings.

== Competition history ==
1st, 2015 Men's Snowboard Superpipe, ASPEN, CO

1st, 2014 Men's Snowboard Superpipe, ASPEN, CO

1st, 2010 Winter Dew Tour Wendy's Invitational, SNOWBASIN, UT

1st, 2010 US Grand Prix of Snowboarding, MAMMOTH MOUNTAIN, CA

1st, 2009 Winter Dew Tour Totino's Open, BRECKENRIDGE, CO

1st, 2009 Burton European Open, LAAX, SUI

4th, 2009 Winter Dew Tour, MT. SNOW, VT

1st, 2008 Winter Dew Tour, BRECKENRIDGE, CO

2nd, 2007 US Open of Snowboarding (Halfpipe), STRATTON, VT

2nd, 2007 World Superpipe Championship, PARK CITY, UT

2nd, 2007 Nippon Open (Halfpipe), FUKUSHIMA, JPN

1st, 2007 Nippon Open (Rail Jam), FUKUSHIMA, JPN

5th, 2007 HONDA SESSION AT VAIL (Slopestyle), VAIL, CO

16th, 2007 O'NEILL EVOLUTION (Quarterpipe), DAVOS, SUI

1st, 2006 U.S. GRAND PRIX (Halfpipe), BRECKENRIDGE

3rd, 2006 PAUL MITCHELL PROGRESSION SESSION (Quarterpipe), BRECKENRIDGE

15th, 2006 BURTON NEW ZEALAND OPEN (Slopestyle), WANAKA, NZ

3rd, 2006 BURTON NEW ZEALAND OPEN (Superpipe), WANAKA, NZ

2nd, 2006 ABOMINABLE SNOW JAM (Slopestyle), MT. HOOD, OR

7th, 2006 ABOMINABLE SNOW JAM (Halfpipe), MT. HOOD, OR

8th, 2006 TELUS WORLD SKI amp; SBD FEST (Superpipe), WHISTLER, BC

7th, 2006 WORLD SUPERPIPE CHAMPIONSHIPS (Superpipe), PARK CITY, UT

2nd, 2006 US OPEN (Superpipe), STRATTON, VT

1st, 2006 US OPEN (Quarterpipe), STRATTON, VT

Best Trick, 2006 US OPEN, STRATTON, VT

13th, 2006 US OPEN (Slopestyle), STRATTON, VT

1st, 2006 NIPPON OPEN (Superpipe), BANDAI, JPN

21st, 2006 CHEVY GRAND PRIX 1–22 (Halfpipe) MOUNTAIN CREEK, NJ

10th, 2006 CHEVY GRAND PRIX 1–20 (Halfpipe) MOUNTAIN CREEK, NJ

9th, 2006 HONDA SESSION (Rail), VAIL, CO

12th, 2006 CHEVY GRAND PRIX 1–8 (Slopestyle), MT. BACHELOR, OR

3rd, 2006 CHEVY GRAND PRIX 1–8 (Halfpipe), MT. BACHELOR, OR

9th, 2006 HONDA SESSION (Rail), VAIL, CO

5th, 2006 CHEVY GRAND PRIX SEASON END RANKINGS

12, 2006 TTR WORLD SNOWBOARD TOUR SEASON END RANKINGS

3rd, CHEVY GRAND PRIX 12–17 (Halfpipe), BRECKENRIDGE, CO

17th, CHEVY GRAND PRIX 12–14 (Halfpipe), BRECKENRIDGE, CO

2nd, AUSTRALIAN OPEN (Slopestyle), PERISHER BLUES, AUS

2nd, AUSTRALIAN OPEN (Halfpipe) PERISHER BLUES, AUS

10th, 2005 FIS WORLD CUP #1 (Halfpipe), VALLE NEVADO, CHILE

2nd, 2005 MIDDLE EARTH SUPERPIPE CHAMPIONSHIPS (Halfpipe), SNOW PARK, NZ

2nd, 2005 NZ OPEN (Slopestyle), WANAKA, NZ

5th, 2005 NZ OPEN (Halfpipe), WANAKA, NZ

4th, 2005 ABOMINABLE SNOW JAM (Slopestyle), MT. HOOD, OR

15th, 2005 WORLD SUPERPIPE CHAMPIONSHIPS (Halfpipe), PARK CITY, UT

5th, 2005 US OPEN (Halfpipe), STRATTON, VT

6th, 2005 US OPEN (Slopestyle), STRATTON, VT

8th, 2005 GRAVITY GAMES (Slopestyle), COPPER MOUNTAIN, CO

2nd, 2005 GRAVITY GAMES (Halfpipe), COPPER MOUNTAIN, CO

13th, 2005 VANS CUP (Best All-Around) NORTHSTAR-AT-TAHOE

== X Games History ==
1st, X GAMES 19 SUPERPIPE

1st, X GAMES 18 SUPERPIPE

4th, X GAMES 13 BEST TRICK SHOWDOWN

14th, X GAMES 13 SUPERPIPE

6th, X GAMES 13 SLOPESTYLE

15th, X GAMES 10 SUPERPIPE

15th, X GAMES 10 SUPERPIPE

Davis is supported by Burton Snowboards and apparel, Mountain Dew, Dragon Eyewear, Martin Guitars, and Frends Headphones
