= Taylor Gold =

American Olympian snowboarder

Personal information
- Full name: Taylor Riley Gold
- Nickname: Ty
- Born: November 17, 1993 (age 32) Steamboat Springs, Colorado, U.S.
- Height: 5 ft 9 in (175 cm)
- Weight: 150 lb (68 kg)

Sport
- Sport: Snowboarding
- Event: Halfpipe
- Club: Steamboat Springs Winter Sports Club
- Coached by: Mike Jankowski, Spencer Tamblyn, and Ashley Berger
Medal record
Men's snowboarding
Representing the United States
FIS Junior World Championships
Silver medal – second place	2011 Valmalenco, Italy	Halfpipe
Winter X Games
Bronze medal – third place	2017 Aspen	SuperPipe

Taylor Riley "Ty" Gold (born November 17, 1993) is an American Olympian snowboarder. He competes in the halfpipe.

He is a two-time U.S. Revolution Tour champion, 2013 Copper Mountain Grand Prix/World Cup champion, 2014 Burton US Open champion, and 2014 Red Bull Double Pipe champion. He is also a Mammoth Mountain U.S. Grand Prix silver medalist (2013–14), 2011 FIS Junior World Championships silver medalist, and 2013 Breckenridge Dew Tour iON Mountain bronze medalist. He competed for the United States in the 2014 Winter Olympics in Sochi, Russia, and in the 2022 Winter Olympics in Beijing, China.

His younger sister is American Olympic bronze medalist and World Champion snowboarder Arielle Gold.

== Personal life ==
Gold is Jewish, and was born in Steamboat Springs, Colorado. His father, Ken Gold, who was a professional moguls skier, videotapes each of his practices. His younger sister is American Olympic bronze medalist and World Champion snowboarder Arielle Gold. He and his family live part of the year in Steamboat Springs and part in Breckenridge, Colorado.

== Snowboarding career ==
=== Early years ===
Gold became interested in competitive snowboarding after watching the sport during the 2002 Winter Olympics . He trained at the Steamboat Springs Winter Sports Club and began competing at the age of nine.

His home mountain is Steamboat. He is coached by Mike Jankowski, Spencer Tamblyn, and Ashley Berger.

=== 2011–12: Junior World Championships silver medalist ===
He was on the 2011 FIS World Championships team in Spain and earned a gold medal in halfpipe at the 2011 FIS Junior World Championships in Valmalenco, Italy. He won in halfpipe at the 2011 U.S. Revolution Tour, in Mount Hood, Oregon, and at the United States of America Snowboard and Freeski Association (USASA) National Championships.

For most of 2012, he was sidelined with a bruised heel injury.

=== 2013–14: Olympian ===
In 2013, Gold won the halfpipe competition in the U.S. Revolution Tour/US Open Qualifiers in Seven Springs, Pennsylvania, and placed sixth in halfpipe at the Burton U.S. Open in Vail, Colorado. He also took second in halfpipe at the 2013 USASA Nationals in Copper Mountain, Colorado, and came in ninth in halfpipe in the 2013 Burton European Open in Laax, Switzerland. He ranked 11th in the World Snowboard Tour standings in 2012–13 and was 5th in the world among men in reaching snowboard finals.

He was also the 2013 Copper Mountain Grand Prix/World Cup champion, earned a silver medal in the Mammoth Mountain U.S. Grand Prix superpipe, and earned a bronze medal in the 2013 Breckenridge Dew Tour iON Mountain Championships.

Gold competed at the 2014 Winter Olympics at Rosa Khutor Extreme Park in Sochi, Russia, in the halfpipe competition, after becoming the first snowboarder to qualify for the men's USA Team. On February 11, 2014, at the Olympics Gold almost went to the finals of the snowboard halfpipe. But, on the end of his second run in a two-round semi-final, he tried one last trick but ran out of halfpipe and fell. He was one of the first two athletes to compete at a Summer or Winter Olympics with the surname "Gold."

His sister was the youngest member of the US 2014 Sochi Winter Olympics halfpipe team at the age of 17. But she was not able to compete in the qualification for the Olympic halfpipe finals, because of a separated right shoulder injury she suffered on February 12 when she caught an edge at the end of the pipe during a practice run and crashed moments before her competition.

Not long after returning from Sochi, Gold won first place in the 32nd annual 2014 Burton US Open half-pipe competition in Vail and the Red Bull Double Pipe over second-place 2014 Olympic bronze medalist Taku Hiraoka of Japan.

=== 2015–present ===
In early 2015, Gold had his first Dew Tour win. He suffered a knee injury that included a broken kneecap, which kept him from competing in the 2015-16 season.

Gold won a bronze medal in SBD SuperPipe at the X Games Aspen in 2017. He had to sit out the 2017-18 season due to surgery that he had for two different injuries.

In 2022, Gold competed in the men's halfpipe at the XXIV Olympic Winter Games, placing in 5th.

== See also ==
- List of select Jewish skiers
