= Alli Sports =

American organizer of extreme sports events

Alli, Alliance of Action Sports, LLC
- Trade name: Alli Sports
- Formerly: Dew Tour
- Type: Subsidiary LLC
- Industry: Television
- Genre: Sports
- Founded: 2008
- Key people: Wade Martin (President)
- Services: Event organizer
- Owner: NBC Sports Group
- Parent: NBC Sports Ventures
- Website: allisports.com

Alli Sports (legally Alli, Alliance of Action Sports, LLC) is an organizer of extreme sports events that is subsidiary of the NBC Sports Ventures LLC, a unit of NBC Sports Group. The group was formed in 2008 as a joint venture between NBC and MTV Networks, when the latter bought a stake in an extreme sports tour that NBC had been operating, the Dew Tour. While MTV parent Viacom has since sold its share in the venture, it still operates as a part of NBC.

== History ==
Alli was formed in 2008 after NBC sold a stake in the extreme sports tour, the Dew Tour, it had run in partnership with Live Nation, the Dew Tour, to MTV Networks. NBC Sports' chairman Dick Ebersol believed that the Tour needed a secondary broadcast partner, and NBC staff believed that access to MTV's cable channels would help provide exposure to the tour to its target demographic. The partnership adopted the brand Alli, established a new online operation for the group, and added MTV2 as a new broadcast partner for the Dew Tour. Under MTV's part-ownership, Alli also expanded its operations with several new tours, such as the Winter Dew Tour, Gatorade Free Flow Tour and the AMA Motocross Championship series.

In June 2011, MTV Networks announced it would sell its share in the partnership back to NBC Sports Group, as it no longer planned to televise sports programming on MTV2. NBC Sports Group's senior vice president Kevin Monaghan felt that in the wake of its merger with Comcast, it now had enough resources that could be leveraged to help continue Alli's growth. After the return to NBC ownership, Alli events began to be shifted off of non-NBC networks – coverage of the AMA Motocross Championship previously aired by Fuel TV and Speed respectively would move to the Alli website and NBC Sports Network for its 2012 season, and the Summer Dew Tour (previously aired by USA Network and MTV2) were migrated to Comcast SportsNet and NBC Sports Network in 2012.

In May 2013, the United States Ski and Snowboard Association reached an agreement with Alli to allow a Winter Dew Tour event in Breckenridge, Colorado to serve as a qualifying event for the 2014 Winter Olympics team. The arrangement gives the USSA control over certain aspects of the event (such as its format, and selling advertising to its own official sponsors during the telecast), and will also be used to help promote its own Grand Prix series.

In 2015, facing declining viewership, NBC shuttered its action sports division, and sold the Dew Tour to TEN: The Enthusiast Network.

== Series ==
Alli operates the following series:

- Dew Tour
- Winter Dew Tour
- Gatorade Free Flow Tour
- AMA Motocross Championship (with MX Sports)

== See also ==
- NBC Sports Group
