= Rowan Cheshire =

British freestyle skier

Personal information
- Born: 1 September 1995 (age 31) Alsager, Cheshire, England
- Height: 1.68 m (5 ft 6 in)
- Parent: Mark Cheshire

Sport
- Sport: Freestyle skiing
- Event: Halfpipe

Rowan Cheshire (born 1 September 1995) is a British freestyle skier, specialising in the halfpipe. Cheshire competed in the 2013 FIS Freestyle Skiing World Cup in Voss Municipality, Norway, where she finished 17th. She won a bronze medal at the 2013 World Junior Championships in Valmalenco. In January 2014 she became the first British female skier to win a halfpipe competition on the FIS Freestyle Skiing World Cup when she took the halfpipe event at a meeting in Calgary. This was the first Freestyle World Cup win for a British female skier since Jilly Curry won an aerials competition in 1992.

She was competing at the 2014 Winter Olympics in Sochi, during which she was knocked unconscious whilst in training. After the crash, she withdrew from the Olympics. The accident left her with a broken nose and severe concussion, and was the first of three head injuries she sustained over a period of 18 months which resulted in her suffering severe physical and mental side effects. However, after two years away from the sport she returned to competition in December 2016, finishing fourth in a Revolution Tour event at Copper Mountain, Colorado, going on to take a top 30 finish in the first halfpipe competition of the 2016–17 FIS Freestyle Skiing World Cup which was also hosted by Copper Mountain, followed by a 14th place in a World Cup competition in Mammoth Mountain in January 2017.

She competed at the 2018 Winter Olympics qualifying for the halfpipe skiing final.
