= Scotty Lago =

American snowboarder (born 1987)

Personal information
- Born: November 12, 1987 (age 38) Seabrook, New Hampshire, U.S.
Medal record
Men's snowboarding
Representing the United States
Olympic Games
| Bronze medal – third place | 2010 Vancouver | Halfpipe |
Winter Dew Tour
| Bronze medal – third place | 2008–2009 Dew Cup | SuperPipe |
| Bronze medal – third place | 2009 Mt. Snow | SuperPipe |
| Bronze medal – third place | 2008 Breckenridge | SuperPipe |
Winter X Games
| Gold medal – first place | 2011 Aspen | Best Method |
| Silver medal – second place | 2009 Aspen | SlopeStyle |
| Silver medal – second place | 2011 Aspen | SuperPipe |
| Bronze medal – third place | 2006 Aspen | SuperPipe |

Scotty Lago (born November 12, 1987) is an American snowboarder. He is the 2004 world half-pipe champion and winner of a bronze medal at the 2010 Winter Olympics.

== Career ==
Lago has been riding since 1996. He is sponsored by Hudsen Collective, ION cameras, Mountain Dew, Moultrie Mobile, Smith Optics and Friends. He began snowboarding at a local tubing hill in Amesbury, Massachusetts.

Lago was a member of the 2010 U.S. Olympic Snowboarding half-pipe team along with Shaun White, Greg Bretz, and Louie Vito. On February 17, 2010, Lago won the bronze medal with a score of 42.8 out of 50.0.

On February 19, 2010, controversial photos surfaced of Lago with his bronze medal and Team USA gear. Due to these photos, he returned home before the end of the games.

During the 2012–13 FIS Snowboard World Cup, Lago secured both a silver medal and a bronze medal with his performances in the half-pipe finals.

== Personal life ==
Lago is from Seabrook, New Hampshire. He has raised money for the Floating Hospital for Children in Boston. When Lago is not snowboarding, he enjoys hunting and fishing. Scotty has a younger brother named William and an older brother named Jason. In July 2016 Scotty married former Miss New Hampshire, Bridget Brunet. Lago passes on his love of snowboarding to young snowboarder campers at High Cascade Snowboard Camp, during his Signature Session, Session 5: July 26 – August 3. Lago is a member of the Frends Crew made up of snowboarders Mason Aguirre, Kevin Pearce, Danny Davis, Keir Dillon, Jack Mitrani, Mikkel Bang and Luke Mitrani. Frends is a group of riders who turned their initial friendship into a formal alliance in 2007 to move the sport away from its recent competitive and business focus and return the sport to its grassroots, collegial beginnings.

== Career highlights ==
- 2004 World Quarterpipe Champion
- 1st place 2006 Fis World Cup Halfpipe
- 1st place 2006 Paul Mitchell Progression Session
- 3rd place 2006 X Games Halfpipe
- 5th place 2007 O'Neil Evolution Quarterpipe
- 3rd place 2007 Grand Prix Slopestyle
- 2nd place 2007 Van Cup
- 2nd place 2007 New Zealand Open Halfpipe
- 1st place 2007 World Cup Halfpipe Opener
- 2nd place 2008 Air & Style Quarterpipe
- 2nd place 2009 X Games Slopestyle
- 1st place 2009 Burton US Open Quarterpipe
- 3rd place 2009 Burton US Open Slopestyle
- 2nd place 2010 Grand Prix Halfpipe
- 2nd place 2010 Grand Prix Halfpipe
- 3rd place 2010 Winter Olympics
- 2nd place 2011 Winter X Games Halfpipe
- 1st place 2012 Toyota Big Air
- 2nd place 2013 World Cup Halfpipe
- 3rd place 2013 World Cup Halfpipe
