= Mike Jankowski =

Snowboard coach (born 1976)

Mike Jankowski (born 1976), known as "Coach Janks", is a skiing and snowboarding coach.

== Early life ==
Jankowski is from Memphis, Tennessee, the youngest child of Madaline and Len Jankowski. He graduated from Christian Brothers High School, and attended Northern Arizona University.

== Coaching career ==
In the mid-to-late 1990s, Jankowski was a snowboarding instructor at Arizona Snowbowl near Flagstaff.

He was coach of the U.S. Junior National Team, then promoted to assistant coach of the Olympic Team, before being given the head coaching job.

Jankowski was the Head U.S. Freeskiing and U.S. Snowboarding Coach, and the U.S. Snowboarding Halfpipe and Slopestyle Head Coach, for the 2014 U.S. Snowboarding Team at the 2014 Winter Olympics in Sochi, Russia.

He has coached Gretchen Bleiler, Kelly Clark, Arielle Gold, Taylor Gold, Danny Kass, Scotty Lago, Hannah Teter, and Shaun White, and as of February 2014 had coached athletes to 19 Olympic medals since 2006.
