= Peter Foley =

Peter Foley may refer to:

- Peter Foley (footballer) (born 1956)
- Peter Foley (snowboarding)
