= Kohei Kudo =

Kohei Kudo may refer to:

- Kohei Kudo (footballer)
- Kohei Kudo (snowboarder)
