= Kevin Pearce (snowboarder) =

American snowboarder (born 1987)

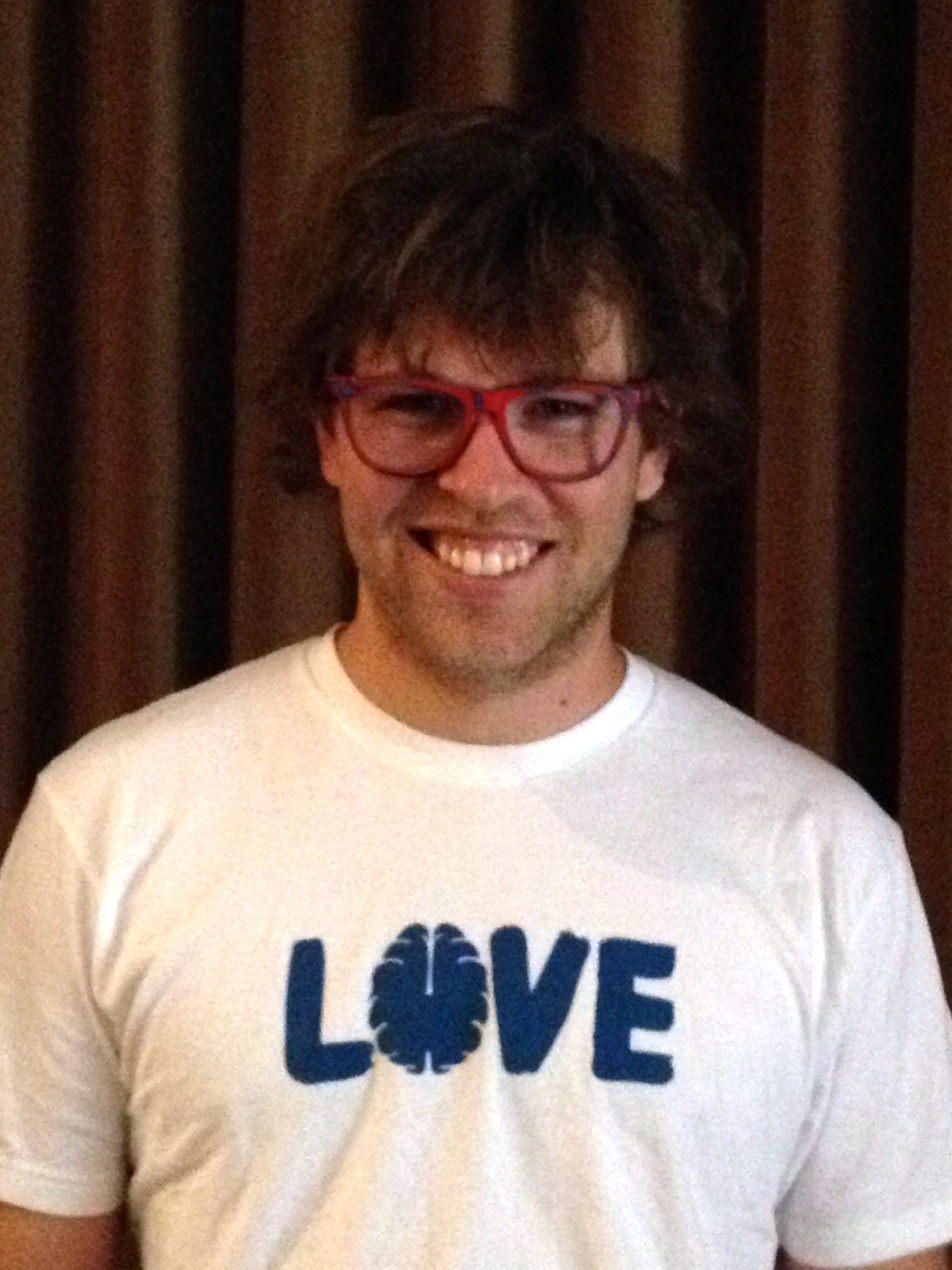

Personal information
- Born: Kevin Pearce; November 1, 1987 (age 38) Hanover, New Hampshire, U.S.

Kevin Pearce
Medal record

Representing the United States

Men's Snowboarding

Winter X Games
Silver medal – second place	2008 Aspen	Big Air
Silver medal – second place	2008 Aspen	Slopestyle
Silver medal – second place	2009 Aspen	SuperPipe
Bronze medal – third place	2008 Aspen	SuperPipe

Kevin Pearce (born November 1, 1987) is an American mentor, health coach and motivational speaker. He is also a former professional snowboarder. He was born in Hanover, New Hampshire, and raised in Hartland, Vermont, before moving with his parents to Norwich, Vermont. He competed professionally from 2007 to 2009, when a training accident left him with a traumatic brain injury.

== Career ==
Pearce won The Arctic Challenge in 2007 and completed back-to-back titles with victory in 2008. He was also the first man to earn two Air & Style rings in one season, winning the Nokia Air & Style in Munich in 2007 and the Billabong Air & Style in Innsbruck in 2008.

In the 2007–08 season he won the Swatch TTR World Snowboard Tour, garnering the TTR World Tour Champion title.

He won three medals at the 2008 Winter X Games XII in Aspen, Colorado. He was also the first athlete in X Games history to compete in three medal events in one day.

Pearce is a member of the Frends Crew (spelled without the "i" to emphasize the collective nature of the group) made up of snowboarders Mason Aguirre, Danny Davis, Scotty Lago, Keir Dillon, Mikkel Bang, Jack Mitrani, and Luke Mitrani. Frends is a group of riders who turned their initial friendship into a formal alliance in 2007 to move the sport away from its recent competitive and business focus and return the sport to its grassroots, collegial beginnings.

== 2009 injury ==
On December 31, 2009, Pearce was critically injured while training in Park City, Utah, on the same half-pipe that would kill fellow skier Sarah Burke in 2012. He struck his head above his left eye during a training run while attempting a cab double cork. He was flown to the University of Utah Medical Center in Salt Lake City. On January 26, 2010, Pearce was transferred out of critical care and in early February was moved to Craig Hospital in Denver, Colorado, a rehabilitation center that specializes in traumatic brain injuries. By June, Pearce was back with his family in Vermont.

In an August 23, 2010, interview, Pearce said he was lucky to recover and "excited to get back onto a snowboard." However, in a December 2011 interview with NBC, he said he will not compete again, but he did get back on a snowboard later that year.

== Personal life and family ==
Pearce is a son of noted international glass artist Simon Pearce, who has a chain of upscale retail stores in the Northeast United States. Kevin's mother, Pia Pearce, is the sister-in-law of Cyrus Vance Jr., the District Attorney of New York County (Manhattan). Kevin Pearce is the youngest of Simon and Pia Pearce's four sons. His brothers David, who has Down syndrome, Andrew, and Adam are also snowboarders. Pearce is currently married to a former executive at Twitter [Kaitlyn Pearce] and has two young children.

Kevin Pearce and The Frends crew have hosted a Signature Session at High Cascade Snowboard Camp each summer since 2008. At camp, Pearce spends time with young snowboarders, helping to coach and mentor.

He and his brother, Adam, started the nonprofit LoveYourBrain in 2014, to help people with traumatic brain injuries and their families. The nonprofit offers yoga, meditation and mindfulness classes in 35 states and Canada and has helped 4,000 people affected by traumatic brain injuries.

== In popular culture ==
The 2013 documentary The Crash Reel by Lucy Walker documents Pearce's preparations for the 2010 Winter Olympics games, the 2009 injury, and his subsequent rehabilitation.
