= Aluan Ricciardi =

French snowboarder (born 1987)

Personal information
- Nationality: French
- Born: October 26, 1987 (age 37)

Sport
- Sport: Snowboarding

Aluan Ricciardi (born 26 October 1987 in Vera Cruz, Bahia, Brazil) is a French snowboarder. He placed fifteenth in the men's halfpipe event at the 2010 Winter Olympics.
