= Destinations Career Academy of Colorado =

Online high school in Colorado, United States

Coordinates: 39.851446°N 105.050905°W

- Julesburg, Colorado

Destinations Career Academy of Colorado is a full-time, diploma granting, public online high school located at 8601 Turnpike Drive, Westminster, Colorado. It currently grades 6–12, and will be adding 4th and 5th grade starting in 2023-24. It is tuition-free for Colorado residents.

== Notable alumni ==
- Arielle Gold, snowboarder
