= Keir Dillon =

American snowboarder (born 1977)

Keir Dillon (born June 1, 1977) is a professional snowboarder specializing in Halfpipe.

== Career ==
Dillon has been a competitive snowboarder since 1997. Although later associated with Southern California, he originally grew up riding on the East Coast of the United States, primarily in Pennsylvania and New York, where he developed his early competitive foundation.

He has earned two bronze medals at the Winter X Games in the Superpipe discipline. Dillon won back-to-back gold medals at the World Superpipe Championships in 2004 and 2005, establishing himself as one of the leading halfpipe riders of that period. He has also placed second and third at the United States Open, one of snowboarding's most prestigious competitive events.

He missed much of the 2006 season after suffering a torn labrum in his left shoulder, an injury that required recovery time and temporarily interrupted his competitive momentum.

Dillon is a member of the Frends Crew (spelled without the "i" to emphasize the collective nature of the group), alongside snowboarders Mason Aguirre, Kevin Pearce, Danny Davis, Scotty Lago, Jack Mitrani, and Luke Mitrani. The group formally united in 2007, evolving from a close-knit group of friends into a structured alliance. Frends sought to move snowboarding away from increasing commercial and competitive pressures and return the sport to its grassroots and collaborative culture.

Throughout his career, Dillon has been sponsored by Amp Beverages and Nike 6.0, among other industry partners.

== Films ==
VICTIMS (1994)
A VHS produced by Eastern Edge and Apocalypse Snowboards. The film features Keir Dillon (credited as Kier Dillon), Ryan Mrachek, Noah Brandon, Seth Neary, Jason King, Todd Richards, and Peter Line. Filming locations included Killington, Vermont; Mount Hood, Oregon; and the U.S. Open at Stratton Mountain.

Snow Blind
A documentary-style snowboarding film in which prominent figures discuss the history and philosophy of the sport, interspersed with riding footage.

AU: A Snowboarding Film (2006)
A documentary following members of the United States Olympic snowboard team as they traveled internationally in pursuit of qualification for the 2006 Winter Olympics.

For Right or Wrong (2006)
A Burton-produced film combining competitive action footage with documentary-style segments focusing on the lives of professional snowboarders both on and off the mountain.

Stand & Deliver

Pulse

== Stunt work ==
Stolen Good (2002) (stunt performer)
"Stolen Good" traces the lives of three friends whose personal entanglements are almost as unpredictable as the sport they've grown to love, snowboarding.

== Competitive achievements ==
Position	Year	Event	Location
2nd	2006	Nippon Open (Superpipe)	Bandai, Japan
3rd	2006	Chevy Grand Prix 1-20 (Halfpipe)	Mountain Creek, New Jersey
1st	2005	Middle Earth Superpipe (Halfpipe)	Snow Park, New Zealand
3rd	2005	New Zealand Open (Halfpipe)	Wanaka, New Zealand
1st	2005	World Superpipe Championships (Halfpipe)	Park City, Utah
3rd	2005	Grand Prix #3 (Halfpipe)	Mountain Creek, New Jersey
3rd	2005	Vans Cup (Halfpipe)	Northstar-at-Tahoe, California
2nd	2005	European Open (Halfpipe)	Laax, Switzerland
3rd	2004	Middle Earth Superpipe Championships (Halfpipe)	Snow Park, New Zealand
3rd	2004	United States Open (Halfpipe)	Stratton, Vermont
1st	2004	World Superpipe Championships (Halfpipe)	Park City, Utah
1st	2002	United States Grand Prix #1 02/03 (Halfpipe)	Park City, Utah
2nd	2002	Ripzone Invitational (Halfpipe)	Blackcomb, BC Canada
2nd	2002	United States Open (Quarterpipe)	Stratton, Vermont
3rd	2002	United States Open (Halfpipe)	Stratton, Vermont
2nd	2002	Grand Prix #4 (Halfpipe)	Breckenridge, Colorado

== X-Games ==
- 3rd, Winter 2004 (Snowboard Superpipe)
- 3rd, Winter 2002 (Snowboard Superpipe)

Various competition results/information taken from EXPN
