= Mason Aguirre =

American snowboarder

Mason Singer Aguirre (born November 10, 1987, in Duluth, Minnesota) is an American former professional snowboarder and currently works as a barber. He competed in halfpipe, slopestyle and superpipe, but consistently placed higher in halfpipe and superpipe competitions. He competed in the men's halfpipe event at the 2006 Winter Olympics.

== Career ==
Aguirre spent his childhood growing up in Duluth where he followed his older brother, Tyler Aguirre, onto the slopes when Mason was six. He turned pro at fifteen and his parents moved their family to Mammoth Lakes, California to pursue his snowboarding career. In 2006, Aguirre became the youngest snowboarder on the U.S. Olympic Snowboarding Team by beating out Ross Powers, 2002 Halfpipe gold medalist and J.J. Thomas, 2002 Halfpipe bronze medalist. Aguirre's first trip to the Olympics was successful, placing 4th overall in the Halfpipe event. Aguirre placed first overall at the 2006 World Superpipe Championships and again at the 2006 Burton New Zealand Open. He was sponsored by Nike and D Howlett Boards, K2 Snowboards, Smith Optics, SoBe, DVS, Windells, Fender Guitars, Mammoth Mountain, Val Surf, The Collection, and R.E.D. Protection.

=== Frends Crew ===
Aguirre was a member of the Frends Crew (spelled without the "i" to emphasize the collective nature of the group) made up of snowboarders Kevin Pearce, Danny Davis, Mikkel Bang, Scotty Lago, Keir Dillon, Jack Mitrani, Luke Mitrani, Eric Jackson, and the Swartz Brothers. Frends is group of riders who turned their initial friendship into a formal alliance in 2007 to move the sport away from its recent competitive and business focus and return the sport to its grass roots, collegial beginnings.

=== Style ===
Known for his aggressive yet smooth riding style, Aguirre regularly pulled off 1080s, 900s and is known for his corkscrewed 540. Another thing that sets him apart from the field is his unusual stature. He stands out of the snowboarding crowd because most snowboarders are more compact making it easy for them to rotate and twist in mid air, while he is a lanky 5’11", weighing only 150lbs. However, he has shown no signs of this affecting his mid air maneuvers.

== Personal life ==
Mason enjoys playing guitar and golf. One of his favorite things to do while trying out different mountains is make videos and have film shoots. His favorite mountain is Mammoth, California.

His sister Molly Aguirre is also a professional snowboarder sponsored by DC.

| | MASON'S MAJOR ACCOMPLISHMENTS | | |
| YEAR | EVENT | DISCIPLINE | PLACE |
| 2006 | WINTER OLYMPICS | HALFPIPE | 4TH |
| 2006 | X GAMES 10 | SUPERPIPE | 2ND |
| 2006 | U.S. GRAND PRIX | HALFPIPE | 2ND |
| 2006 | BURTON NZ OPEN | QUARTERPIPE | 1ST |
| 2006 | WORLD SUPERPIPE CHAMPIONSHIPS | SUPERPIPE | 1ST |
| 2006 | VANS CUP | SLOPESTYLE | 2ND |
| 2006 | CHEVY GRAND PRIX 1–8 | HALFPIPE | 2ND |
| 2006 | GRAND PRIX END RANKING | HALFPIPE | 2ND |
| 2006 | CHEVY GRAND PRIX 12–17 | HALFPIPE | 2ND |
| 2005 | X GAMES | SUPERPIPE | 7TH |
| 2005 | NZ OPEN | QUARTERPIPE | 1ST |
| 2005 | US SNOWBOARD CUP | HALFPIPE | 2ND |
| 2004 | X GAMES | SUPERPIPE | 7TH |
| 2003 | AST SEASON RANK | OVERALL | 1ST |
| 2003 | AST#3 | HALFPIPE | 2ND |
| 2003 | AST#2 | HALFPIPE | 2ND |
