= Peter Foley (snowboarding) =

Snowboarding coach

- Born: 1965 or 1966 (age 60–61)
- Education: University of Colorado Boulder; University of Oregon
- Occupation: Former snowboarding coach
- Years active: 1994–2022
- Employer: Formerly U.S. Ski & Snowboard (USSS)
- Known for: Suspended by SafeSport for ten years for sexual misconduct
- Children: 2
- Awards: USSS Coach of the Year (2001); USSS Snowboard Coach of the Year (2021)

Peter Foley (born 1965 or 1966) is an American former U.S. Ski & Snowboard (USSS) snowboarding coach. Foley served as the head coach of the U.S. Snowboard team starting with when it was founded in 1994, including at three Olympics. In 2001, he was named USSS Coach of the Year, and in 2021 he was selected by USSS as Snowboard Coach of the Year. He was fired by USSS in March 2022, after sexual misconduct allegations were made. He had been the coach of the U.S. snowboarding team for 28 years. On August 8, 2023, SafeSport suspended him for ten years for sexual misconduct.

== Biography ==
=== Early years ===
Foley is the son of Terry Foley, a Bend, Oregon native, former alpine ski racer, and ski coach. He grew up as a ski racer in Colorado. He initially attended the University of Colorado Boulder, and then transferred to the University of Oregon, where he studied journalism. He began snowboarding in the early 1990s, and raced as a professional for two seasons. As of 2010 he lived in Mt. Hood, Oregon, and in 2014 with his wife and two children in Hood River, Oregon. He is also director of Product Development at Insight Replay, which he co-founded in 2013.

=== Team USA snowboard team head coach ===
Foley served as the head coach of the U.S. Snowboard team starting in 1994, when it was founded, including at three Olympics, through 2022. By 2022, he had led it to seven Olympic Games, at which team members won a combined 35 Olympic medals. Foley was in charge of seeding and deciding which athletes competed in World Cup competitions, in addition to the Olympic team. In 2001 he was named U.S. Ski & Snowboard (USSS) Coach of the Year, and in 2021 he was selected by USSS as Snowboard Coach of the Year.

=== 2022; Safety plan, dismissal as coach, temporary suspension ===
In February 2022 former USSS team member and 2010 Olympian Callan Chythlook-Sifsof made social posts on Instagram during the 2022 Beijing Winter Olympics accusing Foley of sexual misconduct. She wrote: "I cannot watch another Olympic Games without saying this publicly." Foley denied the allegations vehemently. USSS immediately implemented an "athlete safety plan" that prohibited Foley from having "one-on-one interaction with female athletes," and from going into an athlete village.

USSS also immediately notified the U.S. Center for SafeSport, an organization authorized by the U.S. Congress to police reports related to sexual abuse in U.S. Olympic sports, upon learning of Chythlook-Sifsof’s Instagram post. But on February 16, SafeSport Center vice president Bobby Click emailed USSS that: "based on the information the center has, we have chosen not to implement any types of measure."

On February 21, 2022, USSS placed Foley on a leave of absence. It fired him on March 20, 2022, days after the Beijing Olympics concluded. He had been coach of the U.S. snowboarding team for 28 years.

In March 2022, three former athletes and a former USSS employee also filed sexual misconduct complaints about Foley with SafeSport. A former USSS employee said that in 2008 Foley coerced her into taking nude photos, and then sexually assaulted her as she said no and tried to move away from him, and eventually rolled her over and ejaculated on her back. She alleged that he sexually assaulted her on two separate occasions. One former athlete said that she was asleep in a hotel room when Foley slid in behind her, reached his "arm over my body and put his fingers inside me.” SafeSport temporarily suspended Foley on March 18, 2022, pending its investigation. The SafeSport temporary suspension was handed down over five weeks after the original Instagram post accusing Foley of sexual misconduct.

USSS said that it had reported the allegations to the United States Olympic & Paralympic Committee (USOPC), as well as to SafeSport.

=== 2023; lawsuits, and 10-year suspension ===
In February 2023, Olympic bronze medalist Rosey Fletcher (parallel giant slalom) and other former USSS team members sued Foley, along with the national federation, its former CEO, and the USOPC, in U.S. District Court in Los Angeles for sex trafficking, harassment, and enabling and covering up repeated acts of sexual assault and misconduct, alleging that the defendants "conspired and acted in concert with one another to commit unlawful acts." They alleged that Foley exploited his position of trust to "coerce sexual acts through force, manipulation, emotional abuse, intimidation, and retaliation." Fletcher said that Foley sexually assaulted her at a U.S. team camp when she was 19, and again at a post-race event at the Olympics. Former national team member Erin O'Malley alleged that she was "sexually assaulted and harassed ... by Foley, who exploited their unequal power dynamic." Foley and the other defendants asked the court to throw out the lawsuit; a hearing is set for October 2023.

Separately in February 2023, the former USSS employee who had previously filed a report with Safesport filed a lawsuit against Foley and others for the alleged sexual assaults.

On August 8, 2023, after an 18-month investigation, SafeSport suspended Foley for ten years for sexual misconduct.

== See also ==
- U.S. Snowboarding
