= U.S. Snowboarding Race to the Cup =

The U.S. Snowboarding Race to the Cup was created in 2005 by U.S. Snowboarding in order to provide a high-level domestic competition series for alpine snowboarders. All events are part of the annual NorAm competition circuit which includes races in Canada and the United States. The purpose of the U.S. Snowboarding Race to the Cup is to develop young alpine riders for World Cup level competition.

== The Series ==
Featuring parallel giant slalom and parallel slalom competitions, this three-stop series is hosted by top resorts across the country. Total prize money of $9,000 ($3,000 per event) is up for grabs and an overall champion is named at the final event.

Top finishers earn "nation's quota" starting spots at the Visa U.S. Snowboarding Cup, a World Cup competition held annually in Lake Placid, NY. Young riders competing in the Race to the Cup are also eligible to qualify for the FIS Snowboarding Junior World Championships and the U.S. Snowboarding Project Gold Team, an opportunity to train with U.S. Snowboarding at their annual summer camp.

For complete details, check the U.S. Snowboarding Race to the Cup website.

== Current Schedule ==
Nov. 15–16, 2007 - Copper Mountain, CO

Thursday, Nov. 15 - Parallel Giant Slalom

Friday, Nov. 16 - Parallel Slalom

Jan. 4–5, 2008 - Steamboat Springs, CO

Friday, Jan. 4 - Parallel Slalom, night event

Saturday, Jan. 5 - Parallel Giant Slalom

*The third stop has yet to be determined
