= Sergio Berger =

Swiss snowboarder

Personal information
- Nationality: Swiss
- Born: January 1, 1983 (age 42)

Sport
- Sport: Snowboarding

Sergio Berger (born 1 January 1983 in Schiers) is a Swiss snowboarder. He placed 25th in the men's halfpipe event at the 2010 Winter Olympics.
