= Carl Tellefsen =

Norwegian-American skier

Carl Tellefsen (September 9, 1854 – October 24, 1908) was a Norwegian-American skiing champion and the first leader of the U.S. Ski and Snowboard Association.

Carl Tellefsen was born in Trondheim, Norway. Tellefsen was active as a ski jumper and was the first leader of the Trondheim Ski Association (Trondheim Skiløberforening) and the Trondheim Ski Club (Trondheim Ski Klub). He emigrated to America in 1887 and settled in Ishpeming, Michigan in March 1888.

In 1956, Carl Tellefsen was the first person to be accorded Honored Membership in the U.S. National Ski Hall of Fame and Museum for his contributions to the sport of skiing.

== Other sources ==
- Blegen, Theodore C. Norwegian Migration to America, The American Transition (Norwegian-American Historical Association, 1940)
- Pontti, John and Kenneth Luostari Midwest Skiing: A Glance Back (Arcadia Publishing, 2000)
- Boyum, Burt and Jamie LaFreniere The Ishpeming Ski Club: Over a Century of Skiing (US National Ski and Hall of Fame Museum, 2003)
