= U.S. Ski & Snowboard =

National ski and snowboard organization

- Formation: February 21, 1905 (part of the National Ski Association of America until 1962)
- Type: National governing body (NGB)
- Headquarters: Park City, Utah, U.S.
- Region served: United States
- Members: 30,000+
- Official language: English
- President and CEO: Sophie Goldschmidt
- Affiliations: United States Ski Team, International Ski and Snowboard Federation
- Staff: 150
- Website: usskiandsnowboard.org

The former USSA logo

U.S. Ski & Snowboard, formerly known as the U.S. Ski and Snowboard Association, is the national governing body for Olympic and Paralympic skiing and snowboarding. Founded in 1905, the organization provides leadership and direction for skiers and snowboarders from over 400 member clubs. The association is headquartered in Park City, Utah.

U.S. Ski & Snowboard and its local clubs coordinate nationwide programs in 10 distinctly different Olympic and Paralympic sports—alpine, cross-country, freestyle moguls, freestyle aerials, freeski, snowboard, ski jumping, Nordic combined, Para alpine and Para snowboard. It is responsible for all aspects of competitive skiing and snowboarding from grassroots programs through elite international teams, including training and fielding the annual U.S. Ski and Snowboarding teams, and, most importantly, the Olympic and Paralympic teams in those sports.

U.S. Ski & Snowboard is composed of nearly 40,000 athletes, officials and coaches, with a network of over 100,000 parents, volunteers and supporters.

It is the most diverse of any Olympic and Paralympic sports organization with 10 different athletic sport programs that account for nearly 50 percent of the Olympic Winter Games events.

== Governance ==
U.S. Ski & Snowboard is governed by a 21-person board of directors and six sport committees including alpine, cross-country, disabled, freestyle, jumping/Nordic combined, and snowboarding. The board and committees meet several times a year including the annual U.S. Ski & Snowboard Congress in May. It is also supported by the U.S. Ski & Snowboard Foundation, which is represented by a board composed of athletes and American business leaders.

U.S. Ski & Snowboard works under the auspices of the United States Olympic & Paralympic Committee (USOPC) as the national governing body for Olympic and Paralympic skiing and snowboarding in the United States. The organization also works under the International Ski and Snowboard Federation (FIS) as the national association for skiing and snowboarding.

== Development pipeline ==
Interested young boys and girls generally begin competing through one of U.S. Ski & Snowboard's 400 local clubs located in communities around the country, generally at ski and snowboard resorts. Clubs provide introductory education and training, as well as competition programs. U.S. Ski & Snowboard sanctions over 4,000 local competitions each year across all sports, with each event conducted by a U.S. Ski & Snowboard club.

One of the U.S. Ski & Snowboard's roles is providing education to ski and snowboard coaches who work with young athletes, and over 5,000 officials who conduct competitions according to U.S. Ski & Snowboard and FIS competition rules.

Each sport is also organized at a regional and divisional level, with slight variances by sport. Alpine skiing, for example, is organized in three regions: Eastern, Rocky/Central and Western. Within those regions are divisions including Eastern, Southern, Central, Rocky Mountain, Intermountain, Far West and Alaska. In some areas, such as New England, there are also state-based organizations. Local organizations host U.S. Ski & Snowboard sanctioned competitions.

Competition programs are held within each region or division leading up to national and international events. From these competitions, athletes earn points and are ranked nationally with the highest ranking athletes earning nominations to join the U.S. national teams, which compete at the World Cup level.

U.S. Ski & Snowboard is one of the only Olympic sports associations in the United States to support a full-time standing national team in every sport. Teams are nominated each spring or summer based on results. Teams for FIS World Championships (held every odd year) and Olympic Winter Games (held every four years) are selected by specific criteria and named for those individual events.

U.S. Ski & Snowboard adopted virtual reality technology to better prepare its olympic team for the 2018 Winter Olympics.

== History ==
In 1904, a meeting was held in Ishpeming, Michigan, to discuss formation of a national ski association, but it wasn't until 1905 that the National Ski Association officially formed. Ishpeming Ski Club President Carl Tellefsen proposed that a meeting be held after the 1905 jumping meet, in order to found a ski association which, among other duties, would oversee jumping tournaments. In 1905, the association was formally organized during a meeting attended by officers from the Ishpeming, Michigan; the Minneapolis, Red Wing and Stillwater, Minnesota; and the Eau Claire, Wisconsin ski clubs. On February 21, 1905, Tellefsen announced formation of the National Ski Association with himself as its first president.

By 1960, the National Ski Association sponsored the National Ski Patrol System, National and International racing and tournament schedules, certified ski instructors, and was headquartered in Denver, Colorado.

In 1962, the 57-year-old National Ski Association renamed itself the U.S. Ski Association (USSA) and moved its offices to Colorado Springs, Colorado. In 1976, the USSA and the U.S. Ski Team agreed to part ways. The USSA continued to control the rules and governance of the sport, as well as the coordination of travel programs for recreational skiers, while the U.S. Ski Team focused solely on the elite national team.

In 1988, the USSA and U.S. Ski Team merged again under the direction of Thomas Weisel, who proposed the creation of a 15-person "super board" responsible for governing both organizations. Howard Peterson, who was the CEO of the USSA at the time, was put in charge of the new organization as CEO and the USSA subsequently moved its national offices from Colorado Springs to its current location in Park City, Utah.

In 2017, USSA announced it was rebranding itself as U.S. Ski & Snowboard, bringing its sports under one mark and brand.

== Location ==
U.S. Ski & Snowboard is located at 1 Victory Lane, Park City, Utah 84060. In May 2009, U.S Ski & Snowboard moved into its new national training and education facility, the Center of Excellence. The facility serves as a training base for elite athletes as well as an education center.

== Controversy ==
In 2022, U.S. Senator Chuck Grassley (R-Iowa) alleged that U.S. Ski & Snowboard had been interfering with a United States Center for SafeSport investigation into charges by three former American athletes and a former U.S. Ski & Snowboard employee against head coach Peter Foley, who coached the U.S. Snowboard team from 1994 to 2022. U.S. Ski & Snowboard President and CEO Sophie Goldschmidt pushed back on the claims the organization had interfered in the probe. After former snowboardcross Olympian Callan Chythlook-Sifsof accused Foley of sexually and racially inappropriate remarks in Instagram posts, and others accused Foley of sexual misconduct, he was temporarily suspended by SafeSport, and then dismissed by U.S. Ski & Snowboard. By August 2022, at least five women had made reports to SafeSport regarding Foley's behavior.

On August 8, 2023, after an 18-month investigation, SafeSport suspended Foley for ten years for sexual misconduct.

== See also ==
- National Sports Center for the Disabled
- U.S. Snowboarding Grand Prix

== Sources ==
- Boyum, Burt; LaFreniere, Jamie The Ishpeming Ski Club: Over a Century of Skiing (U.S. National Ski and Snowboard Hall of Fame Museum, 2003)
