= Louie Vito =

American snowboarder (born 1998)

Personal information
- Full name: Louis Philip Vito III
- Born: March 20, 1988 (age 38) Columbus, Ohio, U.S.
- Home town: Sandy, Utah, U.S.
- Height: 5 ft 5 in (165 cm)
- Weight: 150 lb (68 kg)
- Spouse: Hailey Ostrom
- Website: LouieVito.com

Sport
- Country: United States
- Sport: Snowboarding
- Event: Superpipe
- Turned pro: 2005

Achievements and titles
- Olympic finals: 5th Place, Men's Halfpipe
- World finals: 2012 World Snowboarding Championships, 3rd Place; 2009 FIS Snowboard World Cup, 2nd Place; 2006 World Superpipe Championships, 5th Place
- National finals: 2012 U.S. Grand Prix Champion; 2011 U.S. Grand Prix Champion; 2009 U.S. Grand Prix Champion; 2008 U.S. Grand Prix Champion

Medal record

Men's snowboarding

Representing the United States

Winter X Games Europe
| Gold medal – first place | 2011 Tignes | Superpipe |
| Gold medal – first place | 2013 Tignes | Superpipe |
| Silver medal – second place | 2012 Tignes | Superpipe |
| Bronze medal – third place | 2010 Tignes | Superpipe |

Winter X Games
| Silver medal – second place | 2014 Aspen | Superpipe |
| Bronze medal – third place | 2011 Aspen | Superpipe |

Winter Dew Tour
| Gold medal – first place | 2010 Breckenridge | Superpipe |
| Gold medal – first place | 2011 | Overall |
| Gold medal – first place | 2011 Killington | Superpipe |
| Gold medal – first place | 2012 | Overall |
| Gold medal – first place | 2012 Snowbasin | Superpipe |
| Silver medal – second place | 2011 Breckenridge | Superpipe |
| Silver medal – second place | 2012 Breckenridge | Superpipe |
| Silver medal – second place | 2012 Killington | Superpipe |

U.S. Snowboarding Grand Prix
| Gold medal – first place | 2008 | Overall |
| Gold medal – first place | 2008 Killington | Superpipe |
| Gold medal – first place | 2008 Copper Mountain | Superpipe |
| Gold medal – first place | 2008 Tamarack Mountain | Superpipe |
| Gold medal – first place | 2009 | Overall |
| Gold medal – first place | 2009 Tamarack Mountain | Superpipe |
| Gold medal – first place | 2010 Copper Mountain | Superpipe |
| Gold medal – first place | 2011 | Overall |
| Gold medal – first place | 2012 | Overall |
| Gold medal – first place | 2012 Mammoth | Superpipe |
| Silver medal – second place | 2007 | Overall |
| Silver medal – second place | 2007 Tamarack Mountain | Superpipe |
| Silver medal – second place | 2007 Mount Bachelor | Superpipe |
| Silver medal – second place | 2009 Boreal | Superpipe |
| Silver medal – second place | 2009 Copper Mountain | Superpipe |
| Silver medal – second place | 2010 | Overall |
| Silver medal – second place | 2010 Mammoth | Superpipe |
| Silver medal – second place | 2011 Copper Mountain | Superpipe |
| Bronze medal – third place | 2013 Copper Mountain | Superpipe |

Burton Global Open Series
| Gold medal – first place | 2005 Australian Open | Superpipe |
| Silver medal – second place | 2006 New Zealand Open | Superpipe |
| Silver medal – second place | 2007 Australian Open | Superpipe |
| Silver medal – second place | 2010 U.S. Open | Superpipe |
| Silver medal – second place | 2011 New Zealand Open | Superpipe |
| Silver medal – second place | 2012 U.S. Open | Superpipe |
| Bronze medal – third place | 2010 New Zealand Open | Superpipe |
| Bronze medal – third place | 2013 U.S. Open | Superpipe |

Vans Cup at Tahoe
| Silver medal – second place | 2008 | Superpipe |

Jeep King Of the Mountain Tour
| Gold medal – first place | 2008 Squaw Valley | Superpipe |

Garnier Fructis Pro Challenge
| Gold medal – first place | 2006 | Superpipe |

Louis Philip Vito III (born March 20, 1988) is an American professional snowboarder. He is an Olympian, Winter X Games, and U.S. Grand Prix Champion. He is of Italian descent.

== Early life ==
Louie Vito was born in Columbus, Ohio, but grew up in the nearby city of Bellefontaine. In his teenage years, he moved to Vermont to pursue his love of snowboarding by enrolling in the Stratton Mountain School – a ski and snowboarding academy. He spent his high school years snowboarding in the morning, studying in the afternoons, and traveling to competitions when time permitted. After graduating high school, he moved to Sandy, Utah. He is of Italian descent.

== Career ==
Louie Vito has won four U.S. Snowboarding Grand Prix Overall Championships, six X Games medals, and two Winter Dew Tour Overall Championships, among many other accolades.

Vito rose to prominence on the professional snowboarding scene at age 17 by completing a backside 1080 at the Australian Open Snowboarding Championships – making him the first rider to pull off the complex move in an Australian competition successfully. This helped propel Vito to the top of the podium, capturing his first of two consecutive championships there.

In September 2009, Vito competed on the ninth season of Dancing With the Stars. Partnered with professional dancer Chelsie Hightower, he rehearsed for the show at the same time that he was training for the Olympics. Three months later, he represented the United States at the 21st Olympic Games in Vancouver. In 2022, Vito represented Italy in the halfpipe at the 2022 Winter Olympics in Beijing. At the 2026 Winter Olympics in Milan-Cortina, Louie Vito became the oldest snowboarder to compete in the men's halfpipe event.

== Charity ==
Each year Vito holds the "Louie Vito Rail Jam" in his hometown at Mad River Mountain. The event is held to mentor young riders who are given the opportunity to compete without an entry fee and get outfitted in Vito's premium gear. The Rail Jam supports local charity St. Vincent de Paul through money raised from auction items and food donated to the food bank by everyone who attends.

== Results ==
- U.S. Olympic Team Member 2010
- Italian Olympic Team Member 2022
- Italian Olympic Team Member 2026
- Gold Medalist – Winter X Games Europe 2013
- Gold Medalist – Winter X Games Europe 2011
- Overall Champion – Dew Cup 2011/2012
- Overall Champion – Dew Cup 2010/2011
- Overall Champion – U.S. Grand Prix 2011/2012
- Overall Champion – U.S. Grand Prix 2010/2011
- Overall Champion – U.S. Grand Prix 2008/2009
- Overall Champion – U.S. Grand Prix 2007/2008
- Silver Medalist – Winter X Games Europe 2012
- Bronze Medalist – Winter X Games 2011
- Bronze Medalist – Winter X Games Europe 2010
- 1st Place – Dew Tour, Snowbasin, UT 2012
- 1st Place – Dew Tour, Killington, VT 2011
- 1st Place – Dew Tour, Breckenridge, CO 2010
- 1st Place – Grand Prix, Mammoth, CA 2012
- 1st Place – Grand Prix, Copper Mtn, CO 2010
- 1st Place – Grand Prix, Tamarack Mtn 2009
- 1st Place – Grand Prix, Killington, VT 2008
- 1st Place – Grand Prix, Copper Mtn, CO 2008
- 1st Place – Grand Prix, Tamarack Mtn 2008
- 1st Place – Jeep King Of the Mountain, Squaw Valley 2008
- 1st Place – Garnier Fructis Pro Challenge, Australia 2006
- 1st Place – Burton Australian Open 2005
- 2nd Place – Burton U.S. Open 2012
- 2nd Place – World Cup, Spain 2009
- 2nd Place – Burton U.S. Open 2010
- 2nd Place – Overall U.S. Grand Prix 2009/2010
- 2nd Place – Overall U.S. Grand Prix 2006/2007
- 2nd Place – Dew Tour, Breckenridge, CO 2012
- 2nd Place – Dew Tour, Breckenridge, CO 2011
- 2nd Place – Dew Tour, Killington, VT 2012
- 2nd Place – Grand Prix, Copper Mtn, CO 2011
- 2nd Place – Grand Prix, Mammoth, CA 2010
- 2nd Place – Grand Prix, Boreal 2009
- 2nd Place – Grand Prix, Copper Mtn, CO 2009
- 2nd Place – Vans Cup Superpipe, Tahoe, CA 2008
- 2nd Place – Grand Prix, Tamarac 2007
- 2nd Place – Grand Prix, Mt. Bachelor 2007
- 2nd Place – Burton New Zealand Open 2011
- 2nd Place – Burton New Zealand Open 2006
- 2nd Place – Burton Australian Open 2007
- 3rd Place – World Snowboard Championships, Norway 2012
- 3rd Place – Burton U.S. Open 2013
- 3rd Place – Grand Prix, Copper Mtn, CO 2013
- 3rd Place – Burton New Zealand Open 2010
- 5th Place – Olympics, Vancouver 2010
- Dancing With The Stars, Season 9
- The Challenge: Champs vs. Pros
