= Luke Mitrani =

American snowboarder, musician (born 1990)

Luke Mitrani (born July 20, 1990) is an American former professional snowboarder. Mitrani placed 1st in the halfpipe at the 2011 Winter Dew Tour with the highest score in Dew Tour history, 97.00.

He has also placed 1st at many U.S. Snowboarding Grand Prix competitions. He was the youngest person to ever make the US National Snowboard Team at the age of 12.

== Biography ==
Mitrani was born in New York City on July 20, 1990 and grew up in Stratton, Vermont. Mitrani previously lived in Truckee, California with fellow snowboarder and friend, Danny Davis. Mitrani is a part of the Frends Crew made up of snowboarders Mason Aguirre, Kevin Pearce, Jack Mitrani, Keir Dillon, Danny Davis, Scotty Lago and Mikkel Bang.

Mitrani started snowboarding at six years old, becoming competitive at 9. At 11, he was the youngest snowboarder to compete in the Halfpipe quarterfinals in the US Open, winning the Boy's Junior Jam in the Open in 2002.

In 2003, as a 12 year old, he was the youngest person ever to join the US National Snowboard Team.

On September 1, 2013, while training at Cardrona, New Zealand, Mitrani suffered spinal cord injuries after aborting an attempted frontside double cork 1080 in midair, and falling 30 feet (9.1 m) onto his head, shoulders and back.

Following his injury, Mitrani turned to music with an interest in becoming a "one-man band". His first album, Walk On The Moon, produced with Lynx, was released in 2018. His second and third albums, Live It Up and Wild Things, were released in 2019 and 2021 respectively. Also in 2021, he was a guest artist on The Elovaters' album, Castles.

=== Personal life ===
Mitrani is a skateboarder, guitar player and music lover. He is a practicing Buddhist.

== Discography ==
- Walk On The Moon (2018)
- Live It Up (2019)
- Wild Things (2021)
