= Revolution Tour =

Snowboarding competition series

The Chevy Revolution Tour is a snowboarding competition series created in 2005 by U.S. Snowboarding to bridge the gap between grassroots level and elite snowboarding competitions. The sole purpose of the Chevy Revolution Tour is to help young riders make the jump to elite level competition and to progress the sport of snowboarding.

== The Tour ==
Featuring halfpipe, slopestyle and snowboardcross the tour, which is hosted annually by top resorts across the country, is the main vein for qualification into the Chevy U.S. Snowboarding Grand Prix series. Competition is open to all riders 13 and older for halfpipe and slopestyle and 15 and older for SBX events.

In addition to the Chevy U.S. Snowboarding Grand Prix, the Chevy Revolution Tour also serves as a qualifier for the US Open, FIS Junior World Snowboarding Championships, USASA Open Class Nationals and the Visa U.S. Snowboarding Cup – a World Cup competition held annually in Lake Placid, NY.

Also on the line is $10,000 in prize money, plus the top male and female junior riders receive an invitation to join U.S. Snowboarding's Project Gold Team, an opportunity to train with U.S. Snowboarding at its annual summer camp.

== Current Schedule ==
Jan. 11–13, 2008 – Spirit Mountain, MN

Friday, Jan 11 – Snowboardcross

Saturday, Jan 12 – Halfpipe featuring Junior Jam

Sunday, Jan 13 – Slopestyle featuring Junior Jam

Jan. 20–22, 2008 – Copper Mountain, CO

Sunday, Jan 20 – Snowboardcross

Monday, Jan 21 – Slopestyle

Tuesday, Jan 22 – Halfpipe

Jan. 26–27, 2008 – Park City Mountain Resort, UT

Saturday, Jan 26 – Halfpipe

Sunday, Jan 27 – Slopestyle

Feb. 22–24, 2008 – Mt. Hood Meadows, OR

Friday, Feb 22 – Snowboardcross

Saturday, Feb 23 – Halfpipe

Sunday, Feb 24 – Slopestyle

Feb 29 – March 2, 2008 – Sno Mountain, PA

Friday, Feb 29, – Snowboardcross

Saturday, March 1 – Halfpipe

Sunday, March 2 – Slopestyle
