= Kohei Kudo (snowboarder) =

Japanese snowboarder (born 1990)

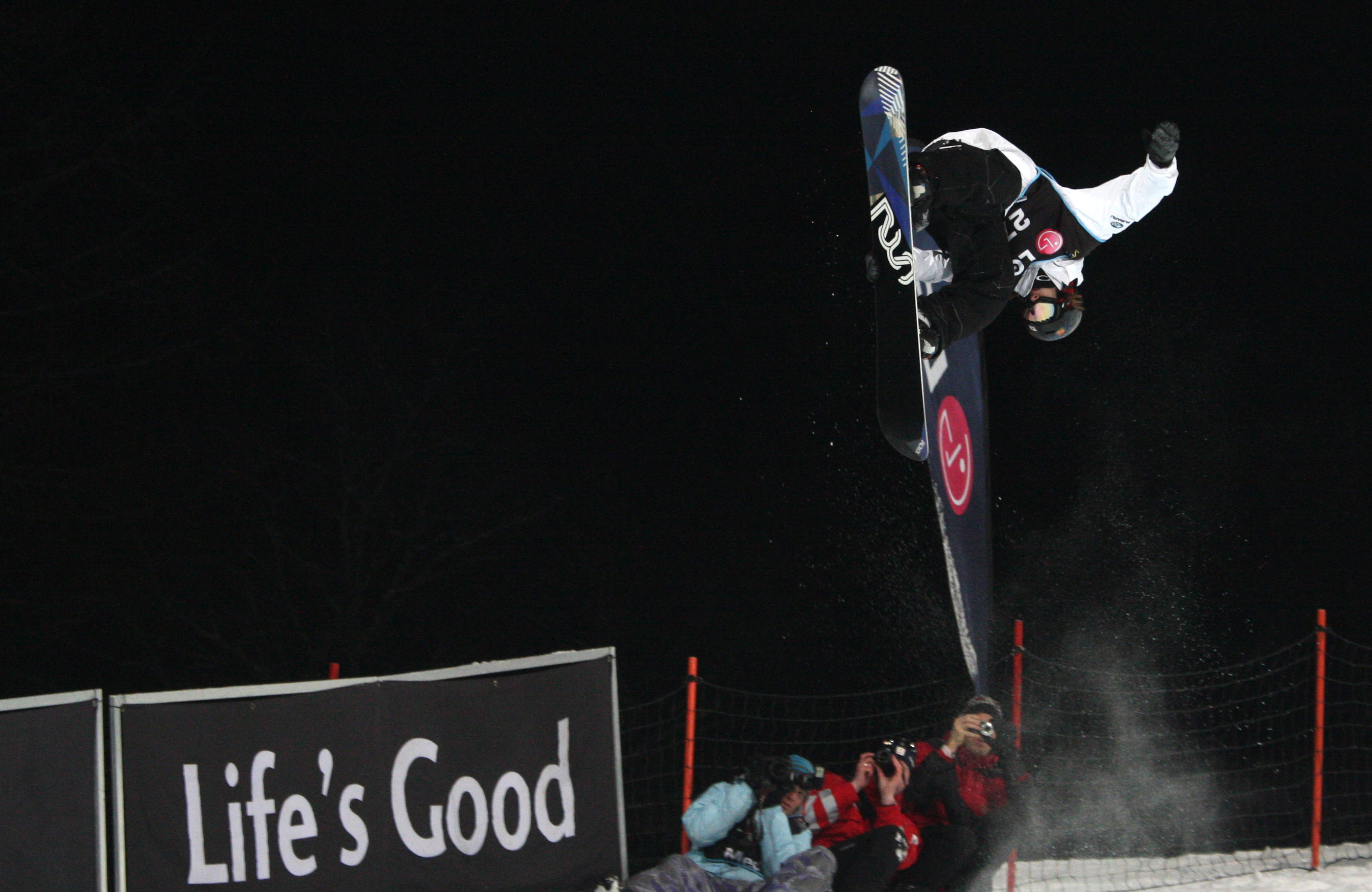
Kudo performing a routine at the LG Snowboard FIS World Cup

Kohei Kudo (工藤洸平, Kudō Kōhei; born 9 February 1990 in Sapporo) is a Japanese snowboarder. He has represented Japan at the 2010 Winter Olympics in Vancouver.
