= Rosa Khutor Extreme Park =

Olympic skiing and snowboarding venue in Sochi, Russia

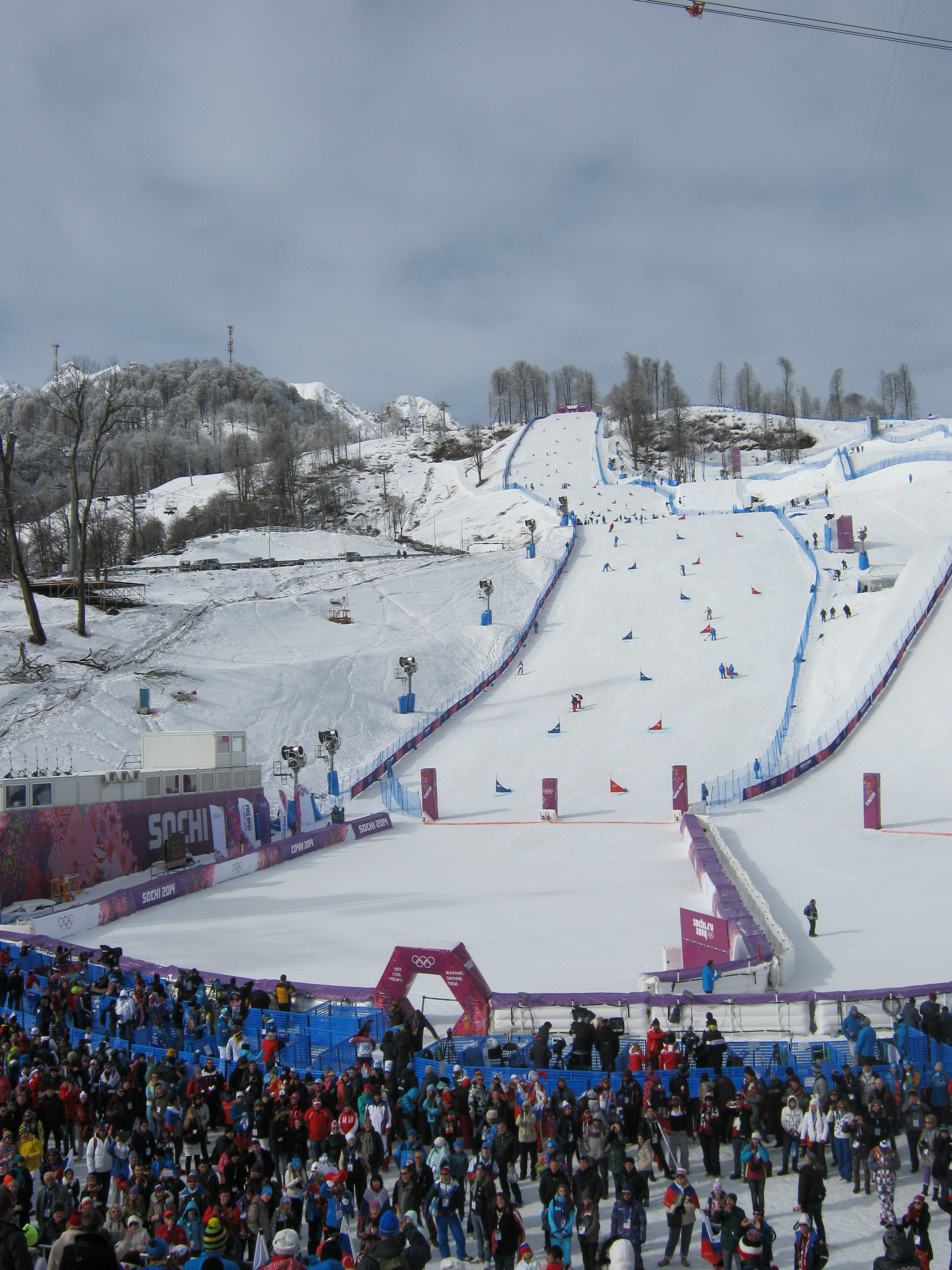
- Interactive map of Rosa Khutor Extreme Park
- Location: Sochi, Russia
- Coordinates: 43°39′27″N 40°19′11″E
- Capacity: 4,000 Freestyle Skiing Mode, 6,250 Snowboarding Mode

Construction
- Opened: 2012

Tenants
- 2014 Winter Olympics (freestyle skiing and snowboarding)

The Rosa Khutor Extreme Park (Russian: Роза Хутор) under license from The Extreme Sports Company and part of the Extreme Hotel, Sochi development, is a skiing venue located west of the Rosa Khutor plateau in Krasnaya Polyana, Russia. During the 2014 Winter Olympics in neighboring Sochi, it hosted the freestyle skiing events and the snowboarding events. Seating 4,000 in the freestyle skiing area and 6,250 in the snowboarding areas, it was first used in September 2012.
