= Callan Chythlook-Sifsof =

American snowboarder (born 1989)

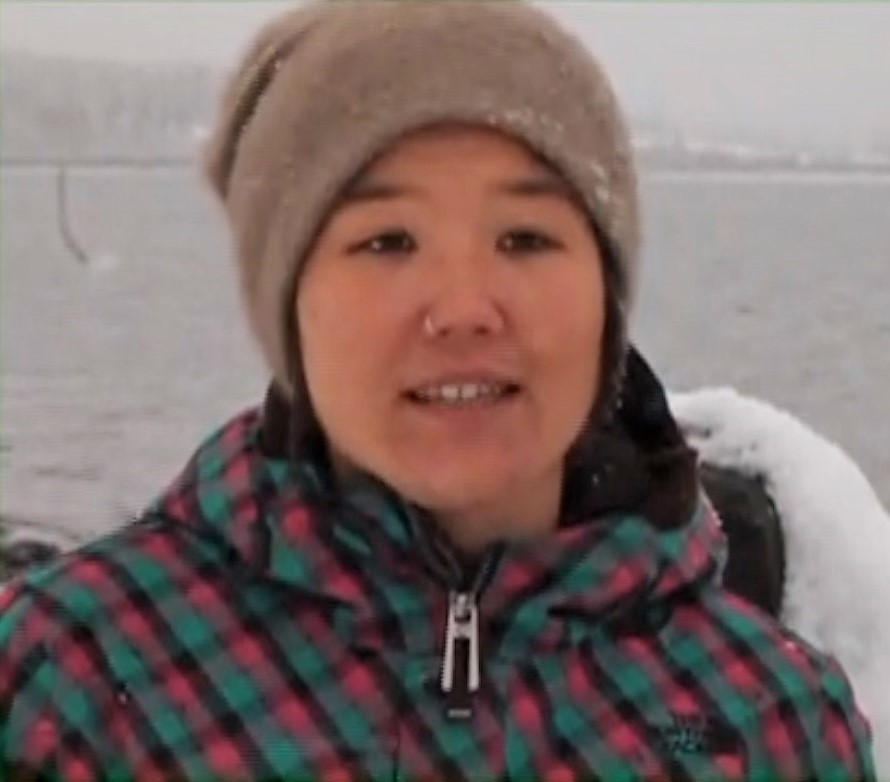
- Chythlook-Sifsof in 2012

Personal information
- Born: February 14, 1989 (age 37) Anchorage, Alaska, U.S.

Sport
- Sport: Snowboarding
Medal record
Women's snowboarding
Representing the United States
Winter X Games
Silver medal – second place	2011 Aspen	Snowboard Cross

Callan Chythlook-Sifsof (born February 14, 1989) is an American Olympic snowboarder who has competed in snowboard cross since 2005. She is Yupik/Inupiaq. She is the first Alaska Native person to compete in the Olympics.

== Biography ==
=== Early life ===
Chythlook-Sifsof grew up in Aleknagik (a rural fishing village of about 300 people) and Dillingham, Alaska; she moved with her mother to Girdwood, Anchorage, Alaska to be closer to the Alyeska Resort. She is Yup'ik and Inupiaq.

=== 2006–14 ===
In 2006, she was invited to her first Winter X Games competition and won a silver medal in 2011. She won the U.S. National Championships in Tamarack, Idaho, in 2007. In 2008, she won the Jeep King of the Mountain World snowboard series in Sun Valley, Idaho. Her best World Cup finishes were 3rd place in Furano, Japan, in 2006, and 2nd place in Arosa, Switzerland, in 2011. She did not compete in 2009 due to a knee injury.

It was announced on January 26, 2010, that Chythlook-Sifsof made the 2010 U.S. Winter Olympic Team. She placed 21st in the qualifying round of women's snowboard cross, and did not advance. It was the first time a native of Alaska competed in the Olympics.

In 2012, she had two top-ten World Cup finishes, but then suffered a knee injury that sidelined her for the rest of the season. In 2014, she retired from snowboarding after three back-to-back knee surgeries, and then injuring her knee again.

In February 2014, during the 2014 Winter Olympics, in Sochi, Russia, for which she did not qualify, Chythlook-Sifsof came out publicly as gay, saying she did so in support of ongoing protests of Russia's anti-LGBTQ laws. She stated "it's important to come out and take a stand and show the world that it's not OK to be a bigot."

=== 2015–present ===
In February 2022, Chythlook-Sifsof made posts on Instagram during the 2022 Beijing Winter Olympics accusing Peter Foley, who coached the U.S. Snowboard team from 1994 to 2022, of sexual misconduct. She wrote, "I cannot watch another Olympic Games without saying this publicly." Foley denied the allegations. USSS immediately implemented an "athlete safety plan" that prohibited Foley from having "one-on-one interaction with female athletes," and from going into an athlete village. He was placed on leave by USSS on February 21, temporarily suspended by SafeSport, and then dismissed by USSS on March 20, 2022. By August 2022, at least five women had made reports to SafeSport regarding Foley's behavior.

On August 8, 2023, after an 18-month investigation, SafeSport suspended Foley for ten years for sexual misconduct.

== Awards ==
- Outsports’ 2022 Female Hero of the Year.
