= U.S. Snowboarding Grand Prix =

Snowboarding competition series

The U.S. Snowboarding Grand Prix was created in 1996 by U.S. Snowboarding with snowboarding progression as a top priority. This annual competition series utilizes top resorts from across the United States to host world-class snowboarding competitions which draw the best male and female riders in the world. It was the first domestic competition series to offer equal prize money to male and female competitors and is now the official qualifying series for making the U.S. Olympic Team for halfpipe.

== The Series ==
The Sprint U.S. Snowboarding Grand Prix is considered the premier snowboard competition series in the United States, providing American riders a clear path to qualifying for the Olympics and progressing the sport.

Previous overall champions include Olympic gold medalists Hannah Teter, Kelly Clark, Shaun White and Ross Powers, as well as Olympic silver medalist Gretchen Bleiler.

With a $375,000 overall purse, it is one of the largest prizes for a snowboarding series. Over the span of the Grand Prix's lifetime, more than $4 million has been awarded to riders.

Every series stop is broadcast on NBC and NBC Sports Network.

The schedule for the 2013–14 season has not yet been announced but will include stops at Park City Mountain Resort, Mammoth Mountain, Northstar California and Copper Mountain (Colorado).

== Past Overall Champions ==
Year	Men's Champion	Women's Champion
2002 U.S. Snowboarding Grand Prix	Wyatt Caldwell	Kelly Clark
2003 U.S. Snowboarding Grand Prix	Steve Fisher	Gretchen Bleiler
2004 U.S. Snowboarding Grand Prix	Andy Finch	Hannah Teter
2005 U.S. Snowboarding Grand Prix	Ross Powers	Lindsey Jacobellis
2006 U.S. Snowboarding Grand Prix	Shaun White	Gretchen Bleiler
2007 U.S. Snowboarding Grand Prix	Tommy Czeschin	Kelly Clark
2008 U.S. Snowboarding Grand Prix	Louie Vito	Kelly Clark
2009 U.S. Snowboarding Grand Prix	Louie Vito & Steve Fisher	Kelly Clark
2010 U.S. Snowboarding Grand Prix	Shaun White	Kelly Clark
2011 U.S. Snowboarding Grand Prix	Louie Vito	Kelly Clark
2012 U.S. Snowboarding Grand Prix	Louie Vito	Kaitlyn Farrington
2013 U.S. Snowboarding Grand Prix	Luke Mitrani	Arielle Gold
