= U.S. Snowboarding =

Snowboarding team of the US

U.S. Snowboarding, the snowboarding arm of the United States Ski and Snowboard Association (USSA), is committed to the progression of snowboarding by providing athletic programs, services, and competitions for male and female athletes of all ages, coast-to-coast. Since the inclusion of snowboarding as a medal sport in 1998, U.S. Snowboarding has accounted for 14 Olympic medals, including the sweep of the podium in men’s halfpipe in 2002 and a best in the world performance of seven medals in 2006.

== History ==
=== Early years ===
*The first U.S. Snowboarding Team was officially named in 1994, prior to the 1994–95 season in order to prepare for the 1998 Winter Olympic Games in Nagano, Japan, where the sport would make its Olympic debut, however the United States had participated in snowboarding World Cup competitions since the tour was created in 1988.

1965 – Invention of the Snurfer. Snowboarding was born in 1965 when Sherman Poppen created the "Snurfer" by bracing a pair of skis together and riding sideways down his backyard hill in Muskegon, Michigan. Through the late 60s, 70s and early 80s snowboard designs developed with the help of snowboard innovators.

1968 – Tongue-in-cheek, students at Muskegon Community College in Muskegon, MI organize the first "World Snurfing Championship." Hosted at "Blockhouse Hill" in Muskegon State Park, the event draws between 200 and 300 spectators, and becomes an annual affair.

1978 – JEM Corporation, manufacturer of the "Snurfer," sponsors the "National Snurfing Championship" in Muskegon. This is the first competition to offer prize money.

1979 – Jake Burton and Paul Graves compete in the "National Snurfing Championship" in Muskegon.

1981 – Modern competitive snowboarding begins with a small contest held in April at Ski Cooper in Leadville, Colorado.

1982 – Paul Graves organizes the National Snowsurfing Championships

1983 – Jake Burton Carpenter organizes the National Snowboarding Championships

1987 – North American Snowboard Association formed

1988 – The first World Cup is held. Four World Cup events were held with two in North America and two in Europe.

1988 – United States Amateur Snowboarding Association formed. Former amateur surf promoter Chuck Allen incorporates the United States Amateur Snowboarding Association (USASA) in July with a $500 donation from Transworld SNOWboarding Magazine. USASA is the first governing body exclusively for competitive amateur snowboarding.

1989 – The USASA held a Trampoline Snowboarding Contest at Snow Valley, California.

=== 1990–94 ===
1990 – The USASA holds their first national championships. Held in February, at Snow Valley, the worst snow storm of the decade hits just before the event and closes all roads to Big Bear. Amateur snowboarders from all over the country are left stranded.

1990 – The International Snowboard Federation (ISF) forms. Following the collapse of the National Association of Professional Snowboarders, Ted Martin, Kazuo Ogura, and Christian Savioz create the ISF as the sanctioning body for international competition.

1993 – First official World Championships held. The ISF holds its first official Snowboard World Championships in Ischgl, Austria.

1993 – The International Ski Federation (FIS) votes to recognize snowboarding. The FIS votes to recognize snowboarding and plans several events in 1994 with a full-fledged World Cup Tour to start in 1995.

=== 1995–2009 ===
1995 – First U.S. Snowboarding Team named. Created as the snowboarding arm of the U.S. Ski and Snowboard Association, U.S. Snowboarding created a national team to compete on the World Cup tour in preparation for the Olympic Games, where the sport was to debut in 1998. Former competitor Peter Foley was named head coach.

1995 – First World Cup tour held

1996 – U.S. Snowboarding Grand Prix created

1997 – U.S. Skiing changes name to U.S. Ski and Snowboard Association. When U.S. Skiing became the official National Governing Body of snowboarding in 1997, the organization changed its name from U.S. Skiing to the U.S. Ski and Snowboard Association.

1998 – Snowboarding debuts at the Olympic Games in Nagano, Japan

2002 – U.S. men sweep Olympic halfpipe podium at Park City, Utah

2006 – U.S. Snowboarding lands seven medals at the Olympics in Torino, Italy

2007 – Center of Excellence Groundbreaking

=== 2010–present ===
2022 – Foley dismissed

In 2022, U.S. Senator Chuck Grassley (R-Iowa) alleged that U.S. Ski & Snowboard had been interfering with a United States Center for SafeSport investigation into charges by three former American athletes and a former U.S. Ski & Snowboard employee against head coach Peter Foley, who coached the U.S. Snowboard team from 1994 to 2022. U.S. Ski & Snowboard President and CEO Sophie Goldschmidt pushed back on the claims the organization had interfered in the probe. After former snowboardcross Olympian Callan Chythlook-Sifsof accused Foley of sexually and racially inappropriate remarks in Instagram posts, and others accused Foley of sexual misconduct, he was temporarily suspended by SafeSport, and then dismissed by U.S. Ski & Snowboard. By August 2022, at least five women had made reports to SafeSport regarding Foley's behavior.

2023 — On August 8, 2023, after an 18-month investigation, SafeSport suspended Foley for ten years for sexual misconduct.

== Making the U.S. Snowboarding Team ==
The pipeline to making the U.S. Snowboarding Team begins with young riders competing at regional competitions across the country. Riders can compete as individuals or often as part of a local club organization or team. Most regional competition series are sanctioned by the United States of America Snowboard Association (USASA). From local series events, freestyle riders make the jump to the Revolution Tour for halfpipe, snowboard cross and slopestyle.

The U.S. Snowboarding Race to the Cup is the national competition series for alpine riders. Based on results from these and other national competitions, riders earn points through a specified criteria toward qualifying for the U.S. Snowboarding Team.

U.S. Snowboarding names team riders for halfpipe and snowboard cross. The team is named annually, usually in mid summer. The USSA is one of the only Olympic sports in America to support a full-time standing national team in every sport. These athletes compete as a team in major national competitions like the Chevrolet U.S. Snowboarding Grand Prix, X Games, Vans Cup, and US Open, as well as World Cup competitions. Teams for FIS World Championships (held every odd year) and Olympic Winter Games (every four years) are selected by specific criteria and named for those individual events. Additionally, top riders from both the Revolution Tour and Race to the Cup series receive invitations to train with U.S. Snowboarding as part of the Project Gold

== U.S. Snowboarding highlights ==
=== Olympic Winter Games ===
Event	Place	Athlete	Highlights
1998 Olympic Games	Nagano, Japan	Ross Powers	Bronze Halfpipe
1998 Olympic Games	Nagano, Japan	Shannon Dunn (now Dunn-Downing)	Bronze Halfpipe
2002 Olympic Games	(United States) Salt Lake City, Utah	Ross Powers	Gold Halfpipe
2002 Olympic Games	(United States) Salt Lake City, Utah	Kelly Clark	Gold Halfpipe
2002 Olympic Games	(United States) Salt Lake City, Utah	Danny Kass	Silver Halfpipe
2002 Olympic Games	(United States) Salt Lake City, Utah	J.J. Thomas	Bronze Halfpipe
2002 Olympic Games	(United States) Salt Lake City, Utah	Chris Klug	Bronze Parallel Giant Slalom
2006 Olympic Games	Torino, Italy	Shaun White	Gold Halfpipe
2006 Olympic Games	Torino, Italy	Hannah Teter	Gold Halfpipe
2006 Olympic Games	Torino, Italy	Seth Wescott	Gold Snowboardcross
2006 Olympic Games	Torino, Italy	Danny Kass	Silver Halfpipe
2006 Olympic Games	Torino, Italy	Gretchen Bleiler	Silver Halfpipe
2006 Olympic Games	Torino, Italy	Lindsey Jacobellis	Silver Snowboardcross
2006 Olympic Games	Torino, Italy	Rosey Fletcher	Bronze Parallel Giant Slalom
2010 Olympic Games	Vancouver, Canada	Shaun White	Gold Halfpipe
2010 Olympic Games	Vancouver, Canada	Seth Wescott	Gold Snowboardcross
2010 Olympic Games	Vancouver, Canada	Scotty Lago	Bronze Halfpipe
2014 Olympic Games	Sochi, Russia	Kaitlyn Farrington; Jamie Anderson; Alex Deibold	Gold Halfpipe; Gold Slopestyle; Bronze Snowboardcross

=== Sprint U.S. Snowboarding Grand Prix Overall Titles ===
Year	Men's Champion	Women's Champion
2002 U.S. Snowboarding Grand Prix	Wyatt Caldwell	Kelly Clark
2003 U.S. Snowboarding Grand Prix	Steve Fisher	Gretchen Bleiler
2004 U.S. Snowboarding Grand Prix	Andy Finch	Hannah Teter
2005 U.S. Snowboarding Grand Prix	Ross Powers	Lindsey Jacobellis
2006 U.S. Snowboarding Grand Prix	Shaun White	Gretchen Bleiler
2007 U.S. Snowboarding Grand Prix	Tommy Czeschin	Kelly Clark
2008 U.S. Snowboarding Grand Prix	Louie Vito	Kelly Clark
2009 U.S. Snowboarding Grand Prix	Louie Vito & Steve Fisher	Kelly Clark
2010 U.S. Snowboarding Grand Prix	Shaun White	Kelly Clark
2011 U.S. Snowboarding Grand Prix	Louie Vito	Kelly Clark
2012 U.S. Snowboarding Grand Prix	Louie Vito	Kaitlyn Farrington
2013 U.S. Snowboarding Grand Prix	Luke Mitrani	Arielle Gold

=== FIS Snowboarding World Championships ===
Event	Place	Athlete	Highlights
1996 World Championships	Lienz, Austria	Ross Powers	Gold Halfpipe
1996 World Championships	Lienz, Austria	Jeff Greenwood	Gold Giant Slalom
1996 World Championships	Lienz, Austria	Lael Gregory	Silver Halfpipe
1996 World Championships	Lienz, Austria	Mike Jacoby	Silver Giant Slalom
1996 World Championships	Lienz, Austria	Anne Marie Uliasz	Silver Halfpipe
1996 World Championships	Lienz, Austria	Rob Kingwill	Bronze Halfpipe
1996 World Championships	Lienz, Austria	Cammy Potter	Bronze Halfpipe
1996 World Championships	Lienz, Austria	Sondra Van Ert	Bronze Giant Slalom, Bronze Parallel Slalom
1997 World Championships	San Candido, Italy	Sondra Van Ert	Gold Giant Slalom
1997 World Championships	San Candido, Italy	Mike Jacoby	Gold Parallel Slalom, Silver Giant Slalom
1997 World Championships	San Candido, Italy	Ian Price	Bronze Giant Slalom
1997 World Championships	San Candido, Italy	Anton Pogue	Bronze Slalom
1999 World Championships	Berchtesgaden, Germany	Ricky Bower	Gold Halfpipe
1999 World Championships	Berchtesgaden, Germany	Kim Stacey	Gold Halfpipe
1999 World Championships	Berchtesgaden, Germany	Rosey Fletcher	Silver Parallel Giant Slalom
1999 World Championships	Berchtesgaden, Germany	Sondra Van Ert	Bronze Giant Slalom
2001 World Championships	Madonna di Campiglio, Italy	Rosey Fletcher	Silver Parallel Giant Slalom
2001 World Championships	Madonna di Campiglio, Italy	Anton Pogue	Bronze Parallel Giant Slalom
2003 World Championships	Kreischberg, Austria	Steve Fisher	Bronze Halfpipe
2003 World Championships	Kreischberg, Austria	Seth Wescott	Silver Snowboardcross
2005 World Championships	(Canada) Whistler, British Columbia	Seth Wescott	Gold Snowboardcross
2005 World Championships	(Canada) Whistler, British Columbia	Lindsey Jacobellis	Gold Snowboardcross
2005 World Championships	(Canada) Whistler, British Columbia	Jason Hale	Bronze Snowboardcross
2005 World Championships	(Canada) Whistler, British Columbia	Hannah Teter	Bronze Halfpipe
2007 World Championships	Arosa, Switzerland	Lindsey Jacobellis	Gold Snowboardcross
2007 World Championships	Arosa, Switzerland	Seth Wescott	Silver Snowboardcross
2007 World Championships	Arosa, Switzerland	Nate Holland	Bronze Snowboardcross
2009 World Championships	Gangwon, South Korea	Nick Baumgartner	Bronze Snowboardcross
2011 World Championships	La Molina, Spain	Lindsey Jacobellis	Gold Snowboardcross
2011 World Championships	La Molina, Spain	Seth Wescott	Silver Snowboardcross
2011 World Championships	La Molina, Spain	Nate Holland	Bronze Snowboardcross
2013 World Championships	(Canada) Stoneham, Quebec	Arielle Gold	Gold Halfpipe
2013 World Championships	(Canada) Stoneham, Quebec	Justin Reiter	Silver Parallel slalom

=== FIS Snowboarding World Cup ===
Year	Athlete	Highlights
1995	Lael Gregory	Halfpipe Champion
1995	Justin Koziol	Giant Slalom Champion, Parallel Champion
1995	Sabrina Sedeghi	Halfpipe Champion
1996	Ross Powers	Halfpipe Champion
1996	Mike Jacoby	Overall Champion, Giant Slalom Champion
1999	Ross Powers	Halfpipe Champion
1999	Tricia Byrnes	Halfpipe Champion
2007	Lindsey Jacobellis	Snowboardcross Champion
2013	Scotty Lago	Halfpipe Champion
2013	Kelly Clark	Halfpipe Champion
