= Dew Tour =

Extreme sports tour

- Formerly: AST Dew Tour
- Sport: Extreme sports
- Founded: 2005
- Country: All
- Broadcaster: NBC Sports
- Website: DewTour.com (defunct)

The Dew Tour is an extreme sports circuit organized by Coalition 375 LLC, an alliance of elite action sports experts.

== History ==
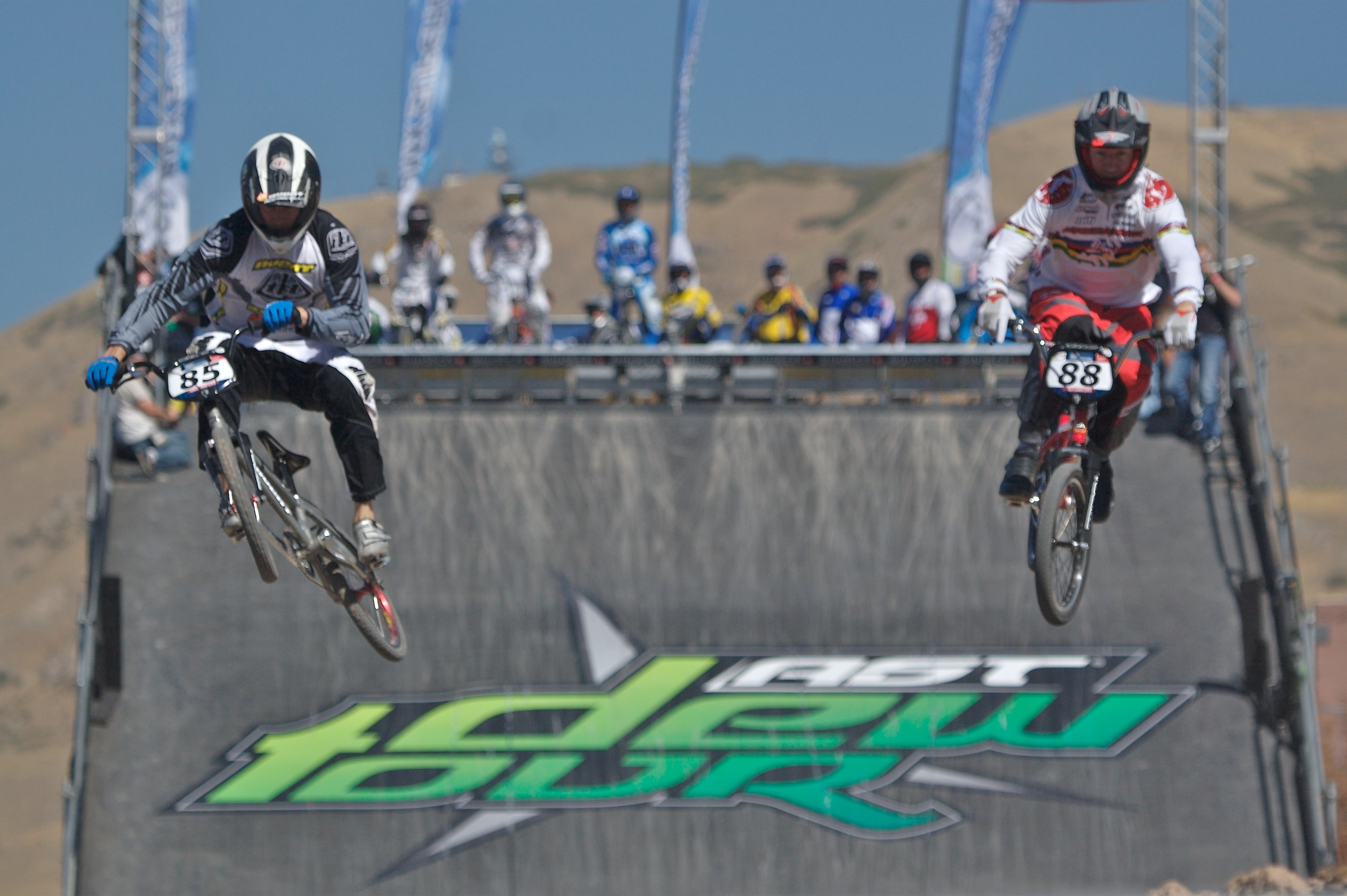
BMX Dew Tour 2007 in Salt Lake City, Utah.

The tour was announced in late 2004, and made its debut in Louisville, KY in June 2005. The tour then made stops in Denver, Portland, Oregon, and San Jose, California, and wrapped up its inaugural season in Orlando, Florida, in October that year. In its first year, the tour was a major success and returned to those five cities in 2006. In 2007, the tour replaced their Louisville, Denver and San Jose stops with events in Baltimore, Cleveland, and Salt Lake City. They did return to Portland and Orlando that year. The Salt Lake City event brought an overall attendance record to the tour. In 2009, the tour was trimmed down to four events for the BMX and skateboard athletes, and three stops for the FMX riders. The tour left Baltimore and Cleveland and brought two sanctioned events to Chicago for BMX, and to Boston for skateboarding. The tour continued to return to Portland, Salt Lake City, and Orlando. In 2010, the tour relocated its final event in Orlando to Las Vegas, due to the closure of the Amway Arena. In 2011, the tour was reduced to four stops: Ocean City, Maryland, Portland, Salt Lake City, and Las Vegas. A new event, in skateboard bowl, was introduced in Ocean City.

The first Winter Dew Tour, a spin-off focusing on winter sports, was held in late 2008–early 2009 with events in snowboarding and freestyle skiing. The tour made stops at the Breckenridge Ski Resort, Mount Snow, Northstar California. During the 2010–2011 season, the tour returned to Breckenridge, but moved its Vermont stop from Mount Snow to the Killington Ski Resort, and the Tahoe event to Snowbasin in Ogden, Utah.

The Dew Tour was originally formed as a joint venture between NBC Sports and Live Nation. In 2008, NBC sold a stake in the series to MTV Networks, forming a new joint venture Alli to manage the series, and broadcasting events on MTV2. Following the acquisition of NBC Universal by Comcast, MTV sold its stake back to NBC in June 2011, with events being aired on NBCSN and Comcast SportsNet networks.

For 2012, the Dew Tour introduced a brand new tour format. It was reduced to three stops from four, with two summer events in Ocean City and San Francisco, and one winter event in Breckenridge; management argued that the increased saturation of extreme sports events made it harder to attract athletes to participate. Streetstyle and big air events were also introduced in San Francisco and Breckenridge respectively. Although total attendance and television viewership was down for the season, the average attendance rose, and viewership of digital content also increased.

In May 2013, the United States Ski and Snowboard Association reached an agreement with Alli to allow the Winter Dew Tour event in Breckenridge to serve as a qualifying event for the 2014 Winter Olympics team. The arrangement gave the USSA control over certain aspects of the event, such as its format, and selling advertising to its own official sponsors during the telecast, and to promote its own Grand Prix series.

In 2014, the tour returned to Ocean City and Breckenridge, but not San Francisco. They instead brought the tour back to Portland, and then debuted it in Brooklyn, New York. In 2015, the tour was reduced again to two summer events and one winter event. The summer events were held in Chicago and Los Angeles, and the winter event returned to Breckenridge. They also did not have most of their signature events at those stops. The 2014 Ocean City event brought the biggest crowd in the town's history.

In 2015, citing declining television viewership, NBC Sports sold the Dew Tour to TEN: The Enthusiast Network, owner of magazines such as Transworld Skateboarding and Transworld Snowboarding. Under its ownership, major changes were made for the 2016 season; the Dew Tour was further reduced to two events, with a single summer skateboarding meet, and a winter ski and snowboard meet, in Long Beach and Breckenridge respectively. New team competitions were also added to both events. The Dew Tour maintained its relationship with NBC for tape-delayed television broadcasts as brokered programs, but live coverage was shifted to online streaming. In addition, there is a larger focus on year-round social media content involving athletes alongside the two events. TEN also leveraged its complementary properties by moving awards presentations by its winter sports magazines to Breckenridge alongside the Winter Dew Tour event. TEN stated that viewership of the events under the new format had seen increases.

In 2019, TEN's adventure sports portfolio was sold to American Media, LLC. In June 2019, the event once again traveled to Long Beach, California, completing a successful skateboarding street and park event that served as the first-ever US-based Olympic Skateboarding qualification stop. The tour continued with a new venue location for Winter in February 2020, moving to Copper Mountain, Colorado, as well as an additional skateboarding stop in May 2021 (shifted from the previous year due to COVID-19) that served as the final US-based Olympic Skateboarding qualifier going into the 2020 Summer Olympics where skateboarding made its Olympic debut.

In 2024 it was announced that the Winter Dew tour was discontinued and would not be held from 2025 onward.

== Sports ==
=== Current sports ===
- Skateboard Vert
- Skateboard Street
- Skateboard Park
- BMX Vert
- BMX Street
- BMX Park

=== From Discontinued Winter events ===
- Snow Slopestyle
- Snow Superpipe
- Snow Halfpipe Team
- Snowboard Streetstyle
- Adaptive Banked Slalom

== Gallery ==
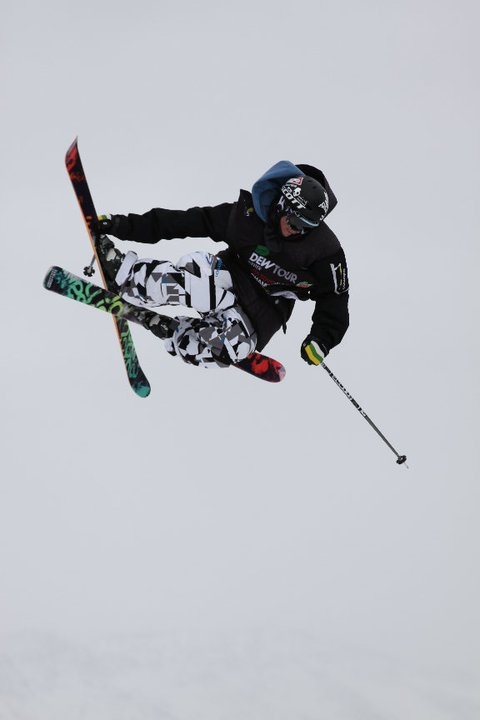
Dew Tour 2011

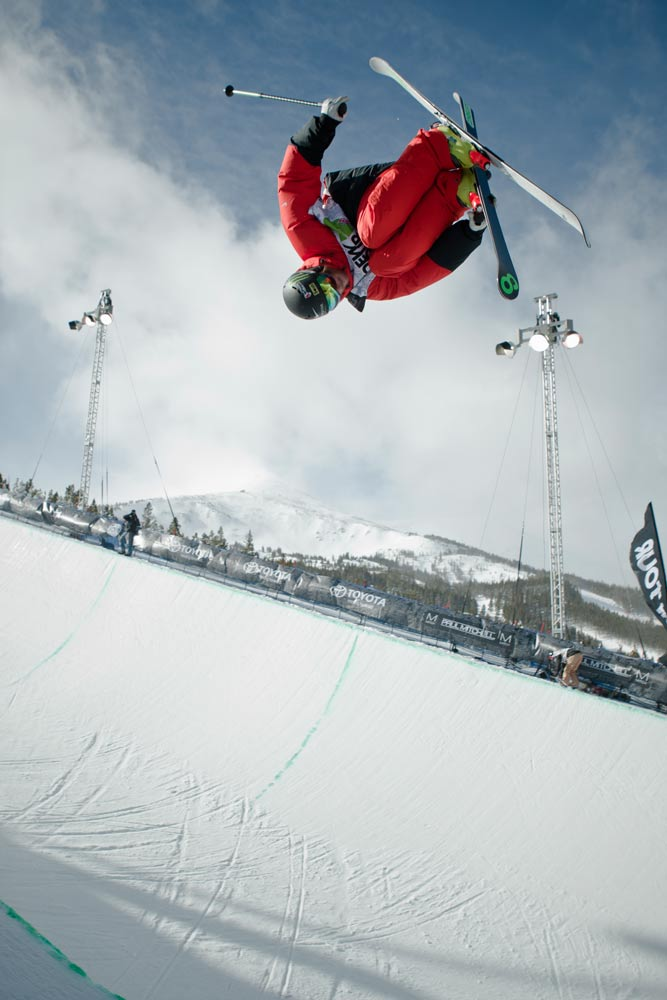
Dew Tour 2013
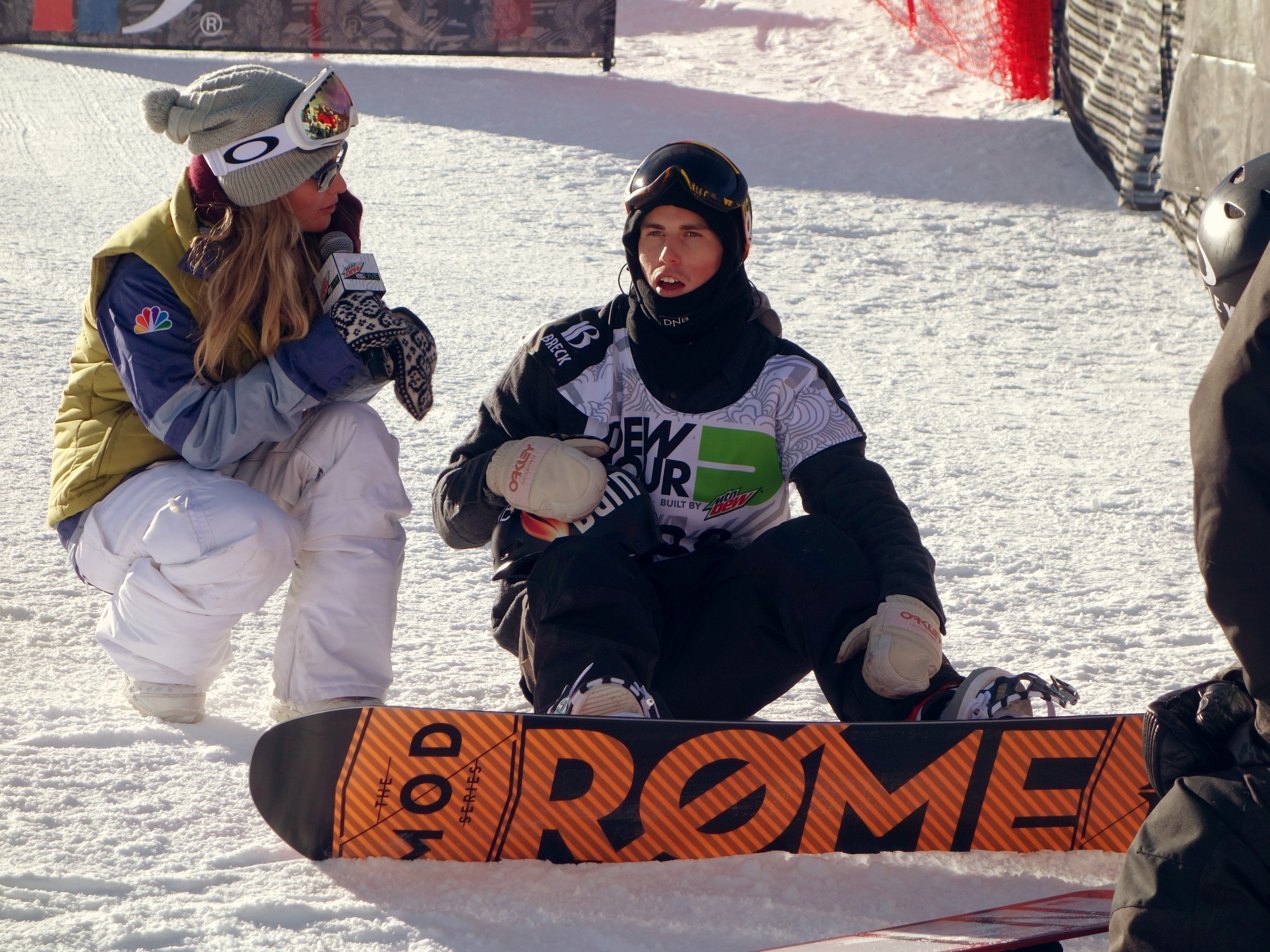
Dew Tour 2013

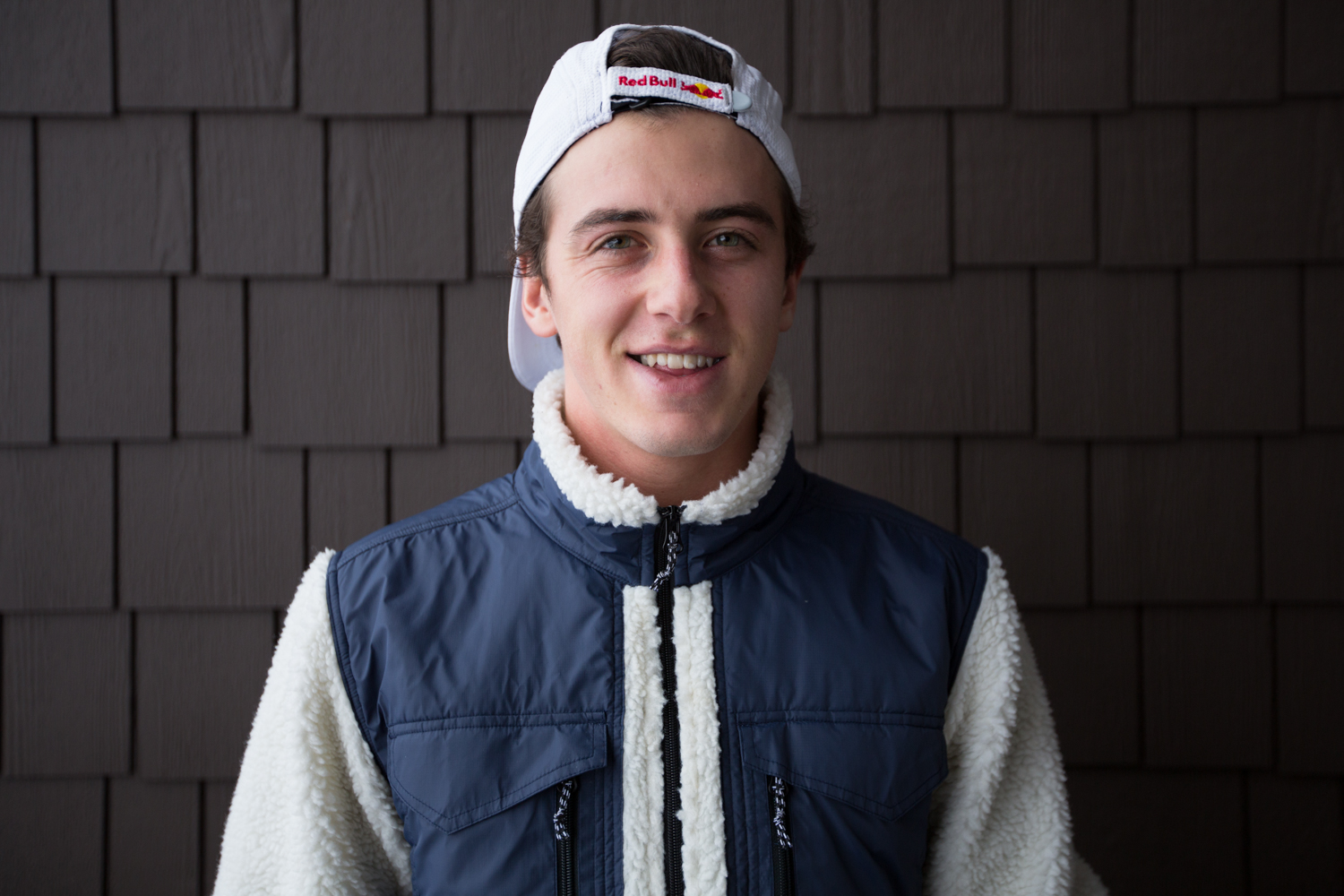
Dew Tour 2016

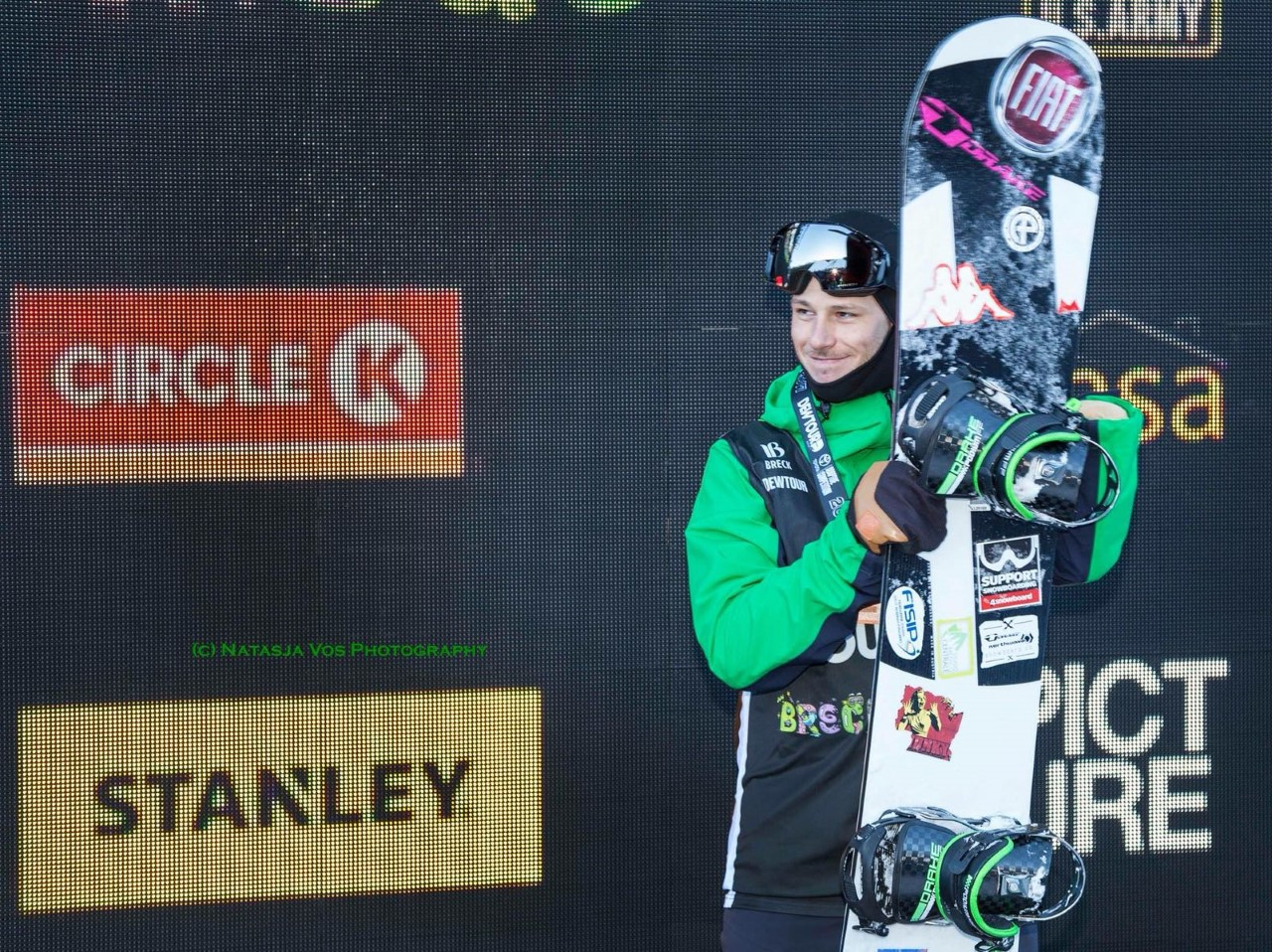
Dew Tour 2017

== See also ==
- Alli Sports
- X Games
- Gravity Games
