= Jack Mitrani =

Jack Mitrani is an American television personality and former professional snowboarder. He gained initial recognition as a competitive athlete in halfpipe and slopestyle disciplines. He started snowboarding at age 8. In 2008, he attempted to set a height record and sustained a fractured back upon landing.

He transitioned into media after he co-founded the Frends Crew. This collective emphasized camaraderie within action sports. He has served as the primary host for the X Games on ESPN and ABC. His role involves lead commentary and athlete interviews for both winter and summer events.

He established the Frendly Gathering music festival in Vermont. This event ran for several years and focused on community and environmental themes.

He is the brother of Luke Mitrani. He lives in Vermont.

== Competitive history ==
He secured a sixth-place finish in the 2011 Winter X Games Tignes SuperPipe final.
