= List of flag bearers for Ireland at the Olympics =

Ireland at the Olympics
- IOC code: IRL
- NOC: Olympic Federation of Ireland
- Website: www.olympicsport.ie
- Medals: Gold 15 Silver 10 Bronze 17 Total 42

Summer appearances
- 1924; 1928; 1932; 1936; 1948; 1952; 1956; 1960; 1964; 1968; 1972; 1976; 1980; 1984; 1988; 1992; 1996; 2000; 2004; 2008; 2012; 2016; 2020; 2024

Winter appearances
- 1992; 1994; 1998; 2002; 2006; 2010; 2014; 2018; 2022; 2026

Other related appearances
- Great Britain (1896–1920)

This is a list of flag bearers who have represented Ireland at the Olympics. Flag bearers carry the national flag of their country at the opening ceremony of the Olympic Games. Men and women from across the country and from a variety of sports have carried the flag at both the Summer Olympic Games and the Winter Olympic Games.

== Firsts ==
Athletes from Ireland competed alongside Great Britain for the first Olympic Games, entering their own team for the first time in 1924. Many Irish Americans competed for the United States, achieving significant success particularly in athletics. Pat McDonald, who had moved to the United States at a young age, won the shot put at the 1912 Games and was chosen to carry the U.S. flag at the opening ceremony of the 1920 Games in Antwerp, Belgium.

John O'Grady was the first athlete to bear the Irish tricolour in 1924. Ireland did not compete in the Winter Olympics until 1992, with Pat McDonagh, a former Summer Olympic rower turned bobsledder, leading out the team.

== Boycotts ==
The 1980 Summer Olympics boycott, initiated by the United States to protest against the Soviet–Afghan War, saw many countries pull out of the Games and only 16 nations appeared at the opening ceremony. Taoiseach Charles Haughey declared his support for the boycott but the Olympic Council of Ireland still chose to send their team to Moscow. Ken Ryan, manager of the Olympic team, said that they supported the government but wanted to participate in the games "purely from the sporting point of view". At the opening ceremony Ryan was the sole representative of the team and marched under a white flag with bearing the Olympic rings. The Soviet cameramen avoided the protesting marchers and few Soviet commentators mentioned it. Only one comment was recorded: "There is the clumsy plot that you all can see, against the traditions of the Olympic movement."

== Other notes ==
The McGarry sisters, Tamsen and Kirsten, both carried the flag for Ireland. Tamsen was the elder sister, born in 1982 in Bolton, England, and was selected as the flag bearer for the 2002 Games in Salt Lake City. It was the only time that she would compete at the Olympics. Kirsten was chosen for the 2006 Games in Turin. Both sisters were alpine skiers.

== List of flag bearers ==
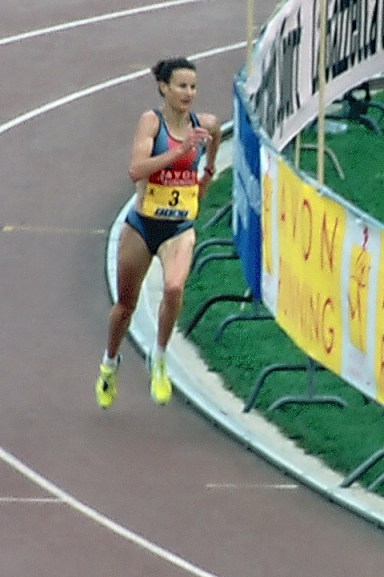
Sonia O'Sullivan, flag bearer at the 2000 Summer Olympics

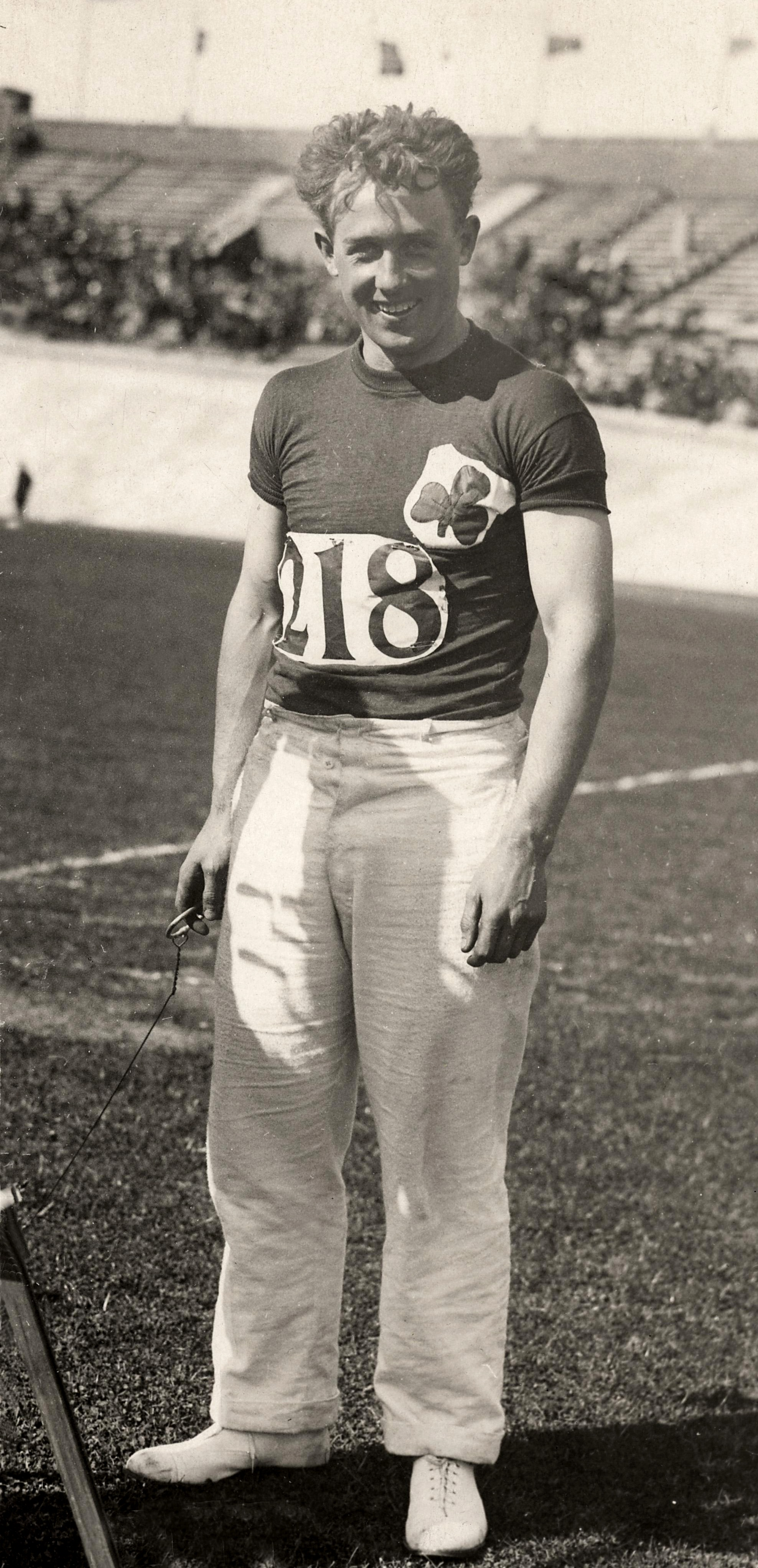
Pat O'Callaghan, flag bearer at the 1932 Summer Olympics

List of flag bearers:

#	Event year	Season	Flag bearer	Sport
1	1924	Summer	John O'Grady	Athletics
2	1928	Summer	Matt Flanagan	Boxing
3	1932	Summer	Pat O'Callaghan	Athletics
4	1948	Summer	Paddy Carroll	Team official
5	1952	Summer	Paddy Carroll	Team official
6	1956	Summer	Kevin Barry	Equestrianism
7	1956	Summer	Tony Byrne	Boxing
8	1960	Summer	Ron Delany	Athletics
9	1964	Summer	John Lawlor	Athletics
10	1968	Summer	Jim McCourt	Boxing
11	1972	Summer	Ronnie McMahon	Equestrianism
12	1976	Summer	Frank Moore	Rowing
13	1980	Summer	Ken Ryan	Team manager
14	1984	Summer	Gerry Mullins	Equestrianism
15	1988	Summer	Wayne McCullough	Boxing
16	1992	Winter	Pat McDonagh	Bobsleigh
17	1992	Summer	Michelle Smith	Swimming
18	1996	Summer	Francie Barrett	Boxing
19	1998	Winter	Terry McHugh	Bobsleigh
20	2000	Summer	Sonia O'Sullivan	Athletics
21	2002	Winter	Tamsen McGarry	Alpine skiing
22	2004	Summer	Niall Griffin	Equestrianism
23	2006	Winter	Kirsten McGarry	Alpine skiing
24	2008	Summer	Ciara Peelo	Sailing
25	2010	Winter	Aoife Hoey	Bobsleigh
26	2012	Summer	Katie Taylor	Boxing
27	2014	Winter	Conor Lyne	Alpine skiing
28	2016	Summer	Paddy Barnes	Boxing
29	2018	Winter	Seamus O'Connor	Snowboarding
30	2020	Summer	Kellie Harrington	Boxing
31	2020	Summer	Brendan Irvine	Boxing
32	2022	Winter	Elsa Desmond	Luge
33	2022	Winter	Brendan Newby	Freestyle skiing
34	2024	Summer	Sarah Lavin	Athletics
35	2024	Summer	Shane Lowry	Golf
36	2026	Winter	Thomas Maloney Westgård	Cross-country skiing
37	2026	Winter	Anabelle Zurbay	Alpine skiing

== See also ==
- Ireland at the Olympics
