= Con O'Callaghan =

Con O'Callaghan may refer to

- Con O'Callaghan (hurler), Irish hurler
- Con O'Callaghan (decathlete) (1908–?), Irish Olympic decathlete
- Con O'Callaghan (Gaelic footballer) Gaelic football player

== See also ==
- Cornelius O'Callaghan (disambiguation)
- Conor O'Callaghan, Irish poet
- Conor O'Callaghan (hurler), Irish hurler
