= Ireland at the 2002 Winter Olympics =

- IOC code: IRL
- NOC: Olympic Federation of Ireland
- Website: olympics.ie

in Salt Lake City
- Competitors: 6 (5 men, 1 woman) in 4 sports
- Flag bearer: Tamsen McGarry (alpine skiing)
- Medals: Gold 0 Silver 0 Bronze 0 Total 0

Winter Olympics appearances (overview)
- 1992; 1994; 1998; 2002; 2006; 2010; 2014; 2018; 2022; 2026; 2030

Ireland competed at the 2002 Winter Olympics in Salt Lake City, United States.

In total, six athletes represented Ireland across four different sports. The Irish team failed to secure any medals, with Clifton Wrottesley securing the highest finishing position by coming 4th in the Skeleton event.

== Alpine skiing ==
Two Irish athletes participated in the alpine skiing events – Patrick-Paul Schwarzacher-Joyce in the men's downhill, super–G and combined and Tamsen McGarry in the women's slalom and giant slalom.

The men's downhill took place on 10 February 2002. Schwarzacher-Joyce completed his run in one minute 54.42 seconds to finish 53rd overall.

The men's combined took place on 13 February 2002. Schwarzacher-Joyce completed his downhill run in one minute 51.08 seconds but was subsequently disqualified for a breach of rule 627.2 regarding competition equipment and commercial markings so he did not complete either of the two slalom runs.

The men's super–G took place on 16 February 2002. Schwarzacher-Joyce completed his run in one minute 31.3 seconds to finish 33rd overall.

The women's slalom took place on 20 February 2002. McGarry completed her first run in one minute 29.18 seconds and her second run in one minute 5.56 seconds for a combined time of two minutes 11 seconds to finish 35th overall.

The women's giant slalom took place on 22 February 2002. McGarry completed her first run in one minute 5.44 seconds and her second run in one minute 26.91 seconds for a combined time of two minutes 56.09 seconds to finish 46th overall.

Men

Athlete	Event	Race 1	Race 2	Total	
Athlete	Event	Time	Time	Time	Rank
Patrick-Paul Schwarzacher-Joyce	Downhill			1:54.42	53
Patrick-Paul Schwarzacher-Joyce	Super-G			1:31.30	33

Men's combined

Athlete	Downhill	Slalom		Total	
Athlete	Time	Time 1	Time 2	Total time	Rank
Patrick-Paul Schwarzacher-Joyce	DSQ	–	–	DSQ	–

Women

Athlete	Event	Race 1	Race 2	Total	
Athlete	Event	Time	Time	Time	Rank
Tamsen McGarry	Giant Slalom	1:29.18	1:26.91	2:56.09	46
Tamsen McGarry	Slalom	1:05.44	1:05.56	2:11.00	35

== Bobsleigh ==
Two Irish athletes participated in the bobsleigh events – Peter Donohoe and Paul Kiernan in the two-man bob.

The two-man bobsleigh took place on 16 and 17 February 2002. The first two runs took place on 16 February and the last two runs on 17 February. In their first run, Donohoe and Kiernan completed the course in 48.5 seconds. Their second run was their slowest of the four at 48.95 seconds. They completed runs three and four in the same time – 48.51 seconds. Their total time of 3 minutes 14.47 seconds saw them finish in 26th place overall.

Men

Sled	Athletes	Event	Run 1		Run 2		Run 3		Run 4		Total	
Sled	Athletes	Event	Time	Rank	Time	Rank	Time	Rank	Time	Rank	Time	Rank
IRL-1	Peter Donohoe; Paul Kiernan	Two-man	48.50	25	48.95	29	48.51	22	48.51	23	3:14.47	26

== Cross-country skiing ==
One Irish athlete participated in the cross-country skiing events – Paul O'Connor in the men's sprint.

The men's sprint took place on 19 February 2002. O'Connor completed the qualifying round in four minutes 33.82 seconds. He did not advance to the quarter-finals and finished 69th overall.

Men's sprint

Athlete	Qualifying round		Quarter-finals		Semi-finals		Finals	
Athlete	Time	Rank	Time	Rank	Time	Rank	Time	Final rank
Paul O'Connor	4:33.82	69	did not advance					

== Skeleton ==
One Irish athlete participated in the skeleton events – Clifton Wrottesley in the men's competition.

The men's skeleton took place on 20 February 2002. Wrottesley completed his first run in 51.07 seconds which left him in medal contention in third place after the first runs. However, his slower second run of 51.5 seconds saw him finish fourth in a combined time of one minute 42.57 seconds – 0.42 seconds away from a bronze medal.

Men

Athlete	Run 1		Run 2		Total	
Athlete	Time	Rank	Time	Rank	Time	Rank
Clifton Wrottesley	51.07	3	51.50	9	1:42.57	4
