= Freestyle skiing at the 2026 Winter Olympics – Men's halfpipe =

Men's halfpipe at the XXV Olympic Winter Games
- Freestyle skiing
- Venue: Livigno Snow Park, Valtellina
- Date: 19–20 February 2026
- Competitors: 25 from 12 nations
- Winning time: 93.75

Medalists
1st place, gold medalist(s)		Alex Ferreira	United States
2nd place, silver medalist(s)		Henry Sildaru	Estonia
3rd place, bronze medalist(s)		Brendan Mackay	Canada

The men's halfpipe competition in freestyle skiing at the 2026 Winter Olympics was held 20 February (qualification & final), due to weather conditions, at the Livigno Snow Park in Valtellina. Alex Ferreira of the United States won the event, his first Olympic gold medal. Henry Sildaru of Estonia won the silver medal, making it the country's first medal in men's freestyle skiing, and Brendan Mackay of Canada won the bronze, his first Olympic medal.

== Background ==
The 2022 champion, Nico Porteous, retired from competitions. The silver medalist, David Wise, did not qualify for the event. The bronze medalist, Alex Ferreira, qualified. Finley Melville Ives was leading the halfpipe standings of the 2025–26 FIS Freestyle Ski World Cup before the Olympics. He was also the 2025 World champion.

== Results ==
=== Qualification ===
Q — Qualified for the Final

The top 12 athletes in the qualifiers advance to the medal round. The qualification round was held on 20 February due to adverse weather conditions.

Rank	Bib	Order	Name	Country	Run 1	Run 2	Best	Notes
1	4	5	Brendan Mackay	Canada	87.75	92.75	92.75	Q
2	3	4	Nick Goepper	United States	90.00	DNI	90.00	Q
3	12	11	Henry Sildaru	Estonia	19.25	88.00	88.00	Q
4	2	9	Alex Ferreira	United States	85.75	DNI	85.75	Q
5	5	1	Hunter Hess	United States	82.75	85.00	85.00	Q
6	6	8	Birk Irving	United States	84.25	DNI	84.25	Q
7	8	10	Andrew Longino	Canada	80.00	83.50	83.50	Q
8	10	3	Dylan Marineau	Canada	59.75	82.25	82.25	Q
9	9	2	Gus Kenworthy	Great Britain	81.25	DNI	81.25	Q
10	11	20	Lee Seung-hun	South Korea	76.00	DNI	76.00	Q
11	20	14	Benjamin Lynch	Ireland	57.00	75.75	75.75	Q
12	14	19	Ben Harrington	New Zealand	73.50	75.25	75.25	Q
13	13	15	Toma Matsuura	Japan	69.25	74.75	74.75	
14	15	17	Gustav Legnavsky	New Zealand	13.50	71.00	71.00	
15	7	6	Luke Harrold	New Zealand	65.50	DNI	65.50	
16	24	23	Su Shauibing	China	44.50	63.00	63.00	
17	16	12	Liam Richards	Great Britain	54.50	61.00	61.00	
18	17	18	Robin Briguet	Switzerland	58.25	DNI	58.25	
19	21	24	Sun Jingbo	China	28.25	57.00	57.00	
20	18	16	Sheng Haipeng	China	50.75	54.75	54.75	
21	23	22	Vincent Maharavo	France	26.25	46.25	46.25	
22	25	25	Moon Hee-sung	South Korea	35.00	DNI	35.00	
23	19	13	Samuel Baumgartner	Austria	24.50	DNI	24.50	
24	1	7	Finley Melville Ives	New Zealand	16.25	DNI	16.25	
25	22	21	Yang Kaiyue	China	11.00	13.50	13.50	

=== Final ===
Rank	Bib	Order	Name	Country	Run 1	Run 2	Run 3	Best
1st place, gold medalist(s)	2	9	Alex Ferreira	United States	49.50	90.50	93.75	93.75
2nd place, silver medalist(s)	12	10	Henry Sildaru	Estonia	24.25	92.75	93.00	93.00
3rd place, bronze medalist(s)	4	12	Brendan Mackay	Canada	37.75	53.00	91.00	91.00
4	3	11	Nick Goepper	United States	29.25	89.00	DNI	89.00
5	6	7	Birk Irving	United States	33.00	87.50	88.00	88.00
6	9	4	Gus Kenworthy	Great Britain	6.00	84.75	DNI	84.75
7	8	6	Andrew Longino	Canada	76.50	DNI	DNI	76.50
8	20	2	Benjamin Lynch	Ireland	39.75	44.25	75.00	75.00
9	14	1	Ben Harrington	New Zealand	61.25	DNI	73.75	73.75
10	5	8	Hunter Hess	United States	27.25	DNI	58.75	58.75
11	10	5	Dylan Marineau	Canada	22.50	DNI	DNI	22.50
12	11	3	Lee Seung-hun	South Korea	DNS			
