= Ireland at the 1998 Winter Olympics =

- IOC code: IRL
- NOC: Olympic Federation of Ireland
- Website: olympics.ie

in Nagano
- Competitors: 6 (men) in 2 sports
- Flag bearer: Terry McHugh (bobsleigh)
- Medals: Gold 0 Silver 0 Bronze 0 Total 0

Winter Olympics appearances (overview)
- 1992; 1994; 1998; 2002; 2006; 2010; 2014; 2018; 2022; 2026

Ireland participated at the 1998 Winter Olympics in Nagano, Japan, held between 7 and 22 February 1998. The country's participation in the Games marked its second appearance at the Winter Olympics since its debut in the 1992 Games. The Ireland team consisted of six athletes who competed across two sports. Terry McHugh served as the country's flag-bearer during the opening ceremony. Ireland did not win any medal in the Games, and has not won a Winter Olympics medal as of these Games.

== Background ==
The Olympic Federation of Ireland was formed in 1922, shortly after it became independent of Great Britain in December 1921. The nation made its debut in the Olympics in the 1924 Summer Olympics. The 1992 Winter Olympics marked Ireland's first participation in the Winter Olympics. After the nation made its debut in the Winter Olympics at the 1992 Games, the nation did not participate in the next Winter Games in 1994. This edition of the Games in 1998 marked the nation's second appearance at the Winter Games.

The 1998 Winter Olympics was held in Nagano, Japan, held between 7 and 22 February 1998. The Ireland team consisted of six athletes who competed across two sports. Terry McHugh served as the country's flag-bearer during the opening ceremony. Ireland did not win any medal in the Games, and has not won a Winter Olympics medal as of these Games.

== Competitors ==
Ireland sent six athletes (all men) who competed in four events across two sports at the Games.

Sport	Men	Women	Total
Alpine skiing	1	0	1
Bobsleigh	5	0	5
Total	6	0	6

== Alpine skiing ==
Alpine skiing competitions were held at Happo'one, Hakuba. Patrick-Paul Schwarzacher-Joyce represented Ireland in two events in the men's category. Born in 1972, this was Schwarzacher-Joyce's debut in the Winter Games. He would go on to represent Ireland in the subsequent Winter Games in 2002. In the Men's downhill event, he finished 27th. The combined event consisted of two runs of slalom skiing, and a round of downhill skiing. Schwarzacher-Joyce was ranked last in the slalom rounds with a time of 1:56.22 over two runs. Though he improved to be ranked 14th in the downhill round, he finished in 15th in the overall classification.

Athlete	Event	Slalom		Downhill	Total	
Athlete	Event	Time 1	Time 2	Time	Time	Rank
Patrick-Paul Schwarzacher-Joyce	Men's downhill	—		1:58.71	—	27
Patrick-Paul Schwarzacher-Joyce	Men's combined	1:00.11	56.11	1:42.81	3:39.03	15

== Bobsleigh ==
Bobsleigh events were held at the spiral in Asakawa. The Irish team consisted of five athletes who participated in two events in the men's category. In the two-man event, the first Irish team of Jeff Pamplin and Terry McHugh finished 27th after consistently being ranked around the same mark across the four rounds. The second Irish team of Peter Donohoe and Simon Linscheid were ranked further back in the 35th place. In the four-man event, the Irish team was ranked in the 30th place after finishing more than eight seconds behind the leaders Germany.

Sled	Athletes	Event	Run 1		Run 2		Run 3		Run 4		Total	
Sled	Athletes	Event	Time	Rank	Time	Rank	Time	Rank	Time	Rank	Time	Rank
IRL-1	Jeff Pamplin; Terry McHugh	Two-man	56.32	28	56.05	27	55.99	27	55.96	27	3:44.32	27
IRL-2	Peter Donohoe; Simon Linscheid	Two-man	57.03	35	57.26	37	56.57	32	56.59	33	3:47.45	35
IRL-1	Jeff Pamplin; Simon Linscheid; Garry Power; Terry McHugh	Four-man	55.79	29	55.57	29	55.87	30	—		2:47.23	30
