= Ireland at the 1992 Winter Olympics =

- IOC code: IRL
- NOC: Olympic Federation of Ireland
- Website: olympics.ie

in Albertville
- Competitors: 4 (men) in 1 sport
- Flag bearer: Pat McDonagh (bobsleigh)
- Medals: Gold 0 Silver 0 Bronze 0 Total 0

Winter Olympics appearances (overview)
- 1992; 1994; 1998; 2002; 2006; 2010; 2014; 2018; 2022; 2026

The Republic of Ireland was represented at the 1992 Winter Olympics in Albertville, France by the Olympic Federation of Ireland.

In total, four athletes – all men – represented the Republic of Ireland in one sport: bobsleigh.

The Republic of Ireland had never previously competed at a Winter Olympics. Bobsleighers Gerry Macken, Pat McDonagh, Terry McHugh and Malachy Sheridan were the first to represent the Republic of Ireland at a Winter Olympics.

== Background ==
The Republic of Ireland had never competed at a Winter Olympics before.

== Competitors ==
In total, four athletes represented the Republic of Ireland at the 1992 Winter Olympics in Albertville, France in one sport.

Sport	Men	Women	Total
Bobsleigh	4	–	4
Total	4	0	4

== Bobsleigh ==
In total, four Irish athletes participated in the bobsleigh events – Gerry Macken, Pat McDonagh, Terry McHugh and Malachy Sheridan in the two-man bob.

The two-man bobsleigh took place on 15 and 16 February 1992. The first two runs took place on 15 February and the last two runs on 16 February. In their first run, McDonagh and McHugh completed the course in one minute 2.39 seconds. Their second run was slightly slower at one minute 3.03 seconds. They improved on their third run – one minute 2.44 seconds - but their final run was the slowest of the four at one minute 3.7 seconds. Their total time of four minutes 10.93 seconds saw them finish in 32nd place overall.

In their first run, Macken and Sheridan completed the course in one minute 3.19 seconds. Their second run was slightly slower at one minute 3.42 seconds. Their third run was their slowest of the four at one minute 3.45 seconds and their final run was one minute 3.42 seconds. Their total time of four minutes 13.48 seconds saw them finish in 38th place overall.

Sled	Athletes	Event	Run 1		Run 2		Run 3		Run 4		Total	
Sled	Athletes	Event	Time	Rank	Time	Rank	Time	Rank	Time	Rank	Time	Rank
IRL-1	Pat McDonagh; Terry McHugh	Two-man	1:02.39	32	1:03.03	35	1:02.44	29	1:03.07	34	4:10.93	32
IRL-2	Gerry Macken; Malachy Sheridan	Two-man	1:03.19	40	1:03.42	38	1:03.45	39	1:03.42	37	4:13.48	38

== Aftermath ==
The Republic of Ireland were absent from the 1994 Winter Olympics in Lillehammer, Norway but have been regular entrants since the 1998 Winter Olympics in Nagano, Japan.
