= Siobhán Hoey =

Irish sportswoman (born 1970)

Siobhán Hoey (born 17 July 1970) is an Irish sportswoman from Portarlington, County Laois. She has competed in both track and field and bobsleigh.

== Athletics career ==
Hoey's junior athletics career saw her focus on sprinting and long jumping. As a senior athlete she was national junior long jump champion and record holder both indoor and outdoor. From 1993 to 2000, she was national champion in the triple jump, and also national indoor champion (1993, 1996–1999). Hoey was national long jump champion in 1989. She was the first Irish record holder for the women's triple jump. In inter-varsity competition competing for University College Dublin (UCD), she won golds in the long jump, triple jump, high jump and the two sprint relays. In 1992–1993 Hoey captained the UCD women's squad both in Ireland and at events in Belgium and America. She was also selected captain of the Irish women's Europa Cup team.

== Bobsleigh career ==
In 1999, Hoey and sister, Aoife, were selected for Ireland's first women's bobsleigh team however as she was under-age, Aoife couldn't compete. Hoey became the first Irish woman to drive a bobsleigh at bob school in Lillehammer, Norway. As brake athlete, she competed in European Cup events with sled pilot Audrey Garland (winner of the famed British Gladiator competition) in Lillehammer and Igls, Austria (2000). Sheesley Fitzgerald were the first Irish women to compete at the FIBT World Championships, doing so at Calgary, Canada in 2001. She, Lesley and Aoife competed in European Cup and World Cup events in their bid to qualify for the Salt Lake City Games in 2002. In 2001–2002 she took a year off from being a teacher in Dublin while Aoife took a study break. The sisters received partial funding from the Olympic Council of Ireland but no commercial sponsorship.

Following the Games in 2002, the Hoey sisters teamed up; Aoife in the driving seat and Siobhain as brake athlete. Together the sisters contested European Cup and World Cup events, and the European and World Championships. The sisters placed 13th in the FIBT World Championships in Koenigssee, Germany and placed among the medals in European start championships. Their bid for qualification for the 2006 games got off to a disastrous start when Siobhán was badly injured in a freak accident in the ice house at Calgary, Canada. Mid-training, her heel was hit by the sled runner and cut right through to the Achilles tendon. She had to compete in both the Calgary and Lake Placid events with her foot stitched. The remaining events of the World Cup circuit went well, however the team missed qualification for the 2006 Winter Olympics.

Following the last qualification event in Koenigssee, Germany in January 2006, Hoey retired from the sport. As an officer of the IBSA she has worked with young athletes. Recruiting David Connolly who qualified in the skeleton event for the Torino Games 2006 and Patrick Shannon who qualified in Skeleton for the Vancouver Games 2010. Recruiting and coaching Jennifer Corcoran, who medalled with Aoife Hoey in the bobsleigh World Junior Championships, and Claire Bergin who partnered Aoife for the Vancouver Games 2010. In acknowledgement of her contribution to Irish winter sport, Siobhán was appointed chef de mission for the Winter Olympic Games in Vancouver, Canada 2010 (Siobhán was the first Irish woman to be given this role at either a Winter or Summer Games).
