= Paul Kiernan =

Paul Kiernan may refer to:

- Paul Kiernan (mayor), mayor of Long Branch, New Jersey
- Paul Kiernan (bobsleigh) (born 1974), Irish bobsledder
