= Ireland at the 2018 Winter Olympics =

- Flag of Ireland
- IOC code: IRL
- NOC: Olympic Federation of Ireland
- Website: olympics.ie

in Pyeongchang, South Korea 9–25 February 2018
- Competitors: 5 (4 men and 1 woman) in 4 sports
- Flag bearer: Seamus O'Connor
- Medals: Gold 0 Silver 0 Bronze 0 Total 0

Winter Olympics appearances (overview)
- 1992; 1994; 1998; 2002; 2006; 2010; 2014; 2018; 2022; 2026

Ireland competed at the 2018 Winter Olympics in Pyeongchang, South Korea, from 9 to 25 February 2018. Five athletes represented the country in four sports. OCI Chief Executive Stephen Martin was chef de mission. Ireland won no medals; the best finish was by Seamus O'Connor in the men's halfpipe snowboarding, who came 18th.

== Competitors ==
The following is the list of number of competitors participating in the delegation per sport.

Sport	Men	Women	Total
Alpine skiing	1	1	2
Cross-country skiing	1	0	1
Freestyle skiing	1	0	1
Snowboarding	1	0	1
Total	4	1	5

== Alpine skiing ==
Ireland qualified two alpine skiers, one male and one female.

Athlete	Event	Run 1		Run 2		Total	
Athlete	Event	Time	Rank	Time	Rank	Time	Rank
Patrick McMillan	Men's combined	1:25.77	61	DNF			
Patrick McMillan	Men's downhill	—N/a				1:49.98	52
Patrick McMillan	Men's super-G	—N/a				1:33.54	48
Tess Arbez	Women's giant slalom	1:22.12	56	1:18.12	50	2:40.24	50
Tess Arbez	Women's slalom	59.47	51	59.00	47	1:58.47	46

== Cross-country skiing ==
Thomas Hjalmar Westgård, whose mother is from Dunmore, County Galway and who represented Ireland at the 2017 FIS Nordic World Championships, competed for Ireland in 2018.

Distance

Athlete	Event	Classical		Freestyle		Total		
Athlete	Event	Time	Rank	Time	Rank	Time	Deficit	Rank
Thomas Hjalmar Westgård	Men's 15 km freestyle	—N/a				37:36.6	+3:52.7	63
Thomas Hjalmar Westgård	Men's 30 km skiathlon	44:48.3	57	41:12.7	60	1:32:34.2	+16:14.2	60
Thomas Hjalmar Westgård	Men's 50 km classical	—N/a				DNS		

Sprint

Athlete	Event	Qualification		Quarterfinal		Semifinal		Final	
Athlete	Event	Time	Rank	Time	Rank	Time	Rank	Time	Rank
Thomas Hjalmar Westgård	Men's sprint	3:29.16	62	Did not advance					

== Freestyle skiing ==
Halfpipe

Athlete	Event	Qualification				Final					
Athlete	Event	Run 1		Run 2		Run 1		Run 2		Run 3	
Athlete	Event	Points	Rank	Points	Rank	Points	Rank	Points	Rank	Points	Rank
Brendan Newby	Men's halfpipe	53.80	14	13.20	22	Did not advance					

== Snowboarding ==
Seamus O'Connor competed at the 2014 games in the men's halfpipe and men's slopestyle events and received funding for the 2018 event.

Freestyle

Athlete	Event	Qualification				Final				
Athlete	Event	Run 1	Run 2	Best	Rank	Run 1	Run 2	Run 3	Best	Rank
Seamus O'Connor	Men's halfpipe	65.50	39.75	65.50	18	did not advance				

== See also ==
- Ireland at the 2018 Summer Youth Olympics
