= Sildaru =

Sildaru is a surname. Notable people with the surname include:

- Henry Sildaru (born 2006), Estonian freestyle skier
- Kelly Sildaru (born 2002), Estonian freestyle skier
