= Ireland at the 2026 Winter Olympics =

- Flag of Ireland
- IOC code: IRL
- NOC: Olympic Federation of Ireland
- Website: olympics.ie

in Milan and Cortina d'Ampezzo, Italy 6 February 2026 – 22 February 2026
- Competitors: 4 (3 men and 1 woman) in 3 sports
- Flag bearers (opening): Thomas Maloney Westgård & Anabelle Zurbay
- Flag bearer (closing): Benjamin Lynch
- Medals: Gold 0 Silver 0 Bronze 0 Total 0

Winter Olympics appearances (overview)
- 1992; 1994; 1998; 2002; 2006; 2010; 2014; 2018; 2022; 2026

Ireland competed at the 2026 Winter Olympics in Milan and Cortina d'Ampezzo, Italy, from 6 to 22 February 2026.

Thomas Maloney Westgård and Anabelle Zurbay were the country's flagbearer during the opening ceremony. Meanwhile, Benjamin Lynch was the country's flagbearer during the closing ceremony.

== Competitors ==
The following is the list of number of competitors participating at the Games per sport/discipline.

Sport	Men	Women	Total
Alpine skiing	1	1	2
Cross-country skiing	1	0	1
Freestyle skiing	1	0	1
Total	3	1	4

== Alpine skiing ==
Ireland qualified one female and one male alpine skier through the basic quota.

Athlete	Event	Run 1		Run 2		Total	
Athlete	Event	Time	Rank	Time	Rank	Time	Rank
Cormac Comerford	Men's downhill	—N/a				2:04.40	34
Cormac Comerford	Men's super-G	—N/a				1:34.58	37
Cormac Comerford	Men's giant slalom	1:24.32	46	1:17.43	40	2:41.75	42
Cormac Comerford	Men's slalom	1:07.87	35	1:02.37	28	2:10.24	31
Anabelle Zurbay	Women's giant slalom	1:12.82	57	1:18.88	47	2:31.70	48
Anabelle Zurbay	Women's slalom	56.91	57	1:01.59	46	1:58.50	48

== Cross-country skiing ==
Ireland qualified one male cross-country skier through the basic quota. Following the completion of the 2024–25 FIS Cross-Country World Cup, Ireland qualified a further one male athlete.

Men's
Distance

Athlete	Event	Classical		Freestyle		Final		
Athlete	Event	Time	Rank	Time	Rank	Time	Deficit	Rank
Thomas Maloney Westgård	10 km freestyle	—N/a		23:08.0	54	—N/a		
Thomas Maloney Westgård	20 km skiathlon	24:57.2	37	23:56.3	32	49:24.6	3:13.6	35
Thomas Maloney Westgård	50 km classical	—N/a				2:18.56.5	+12:11.7	23

Sprint

Athlete	Event	Qualification		Quarterfinal		Semifinal		Final	
Athlete	Event	Time	Rank	Time	Rank	Time	Rank	Time	Rank
Thomas Maloney Westgård	Men's sprint	DNS		Did not advance					

== Freestyle skiing ==
Park & Pipe

Athlete	Event	Qualification					Final				
Athlete	Event	Run 1	Run 2	Run 3	Best	Rank	Run 1	Run 2	Run 3	Best	Rank
Benjamin Lynch	Men's halfpipe	57.00	75.75	—N/a	75.75	11	39.75	44.25	75.00	75.00	8
