= Ireland at the 2006 Winter Olympics =

- IOC code: IRL
- NOC: Olympic Federation of Ireland
- Website: olympics.ie

in Turin
- Competitors: 4 (3 men, 1 woman) in 3 sports
- Flag bearers: Kirsten McGarry (opening); Rory Morrish (closing)
- Medals: Gold 0 Silver 0 Bronze 0 Total 0

Winter Olympics appearances (overview)
- 1992; 1994; 1998; 2002; 2006; 2010; 2014; 2018; 2022; 2026

Ireland sent a delegation to compete at the 2006 Winter Olympics in Turin, Italy from 10–26 February 2006. This was Ireland's fourth appearance at a Winter Olympic Games. The Irish delegation to Turin consisted of eight athletes, two alpine skiers, one cross-country skier, one skeleton racer and four bobsledders. The best performance by any Irish competitor at these Olympics was 20th, by David Connolly in the men's skeleton race. The Bobsleigh team, Ireland's first and only at the Olympics finished 24th, driven by Peter O'Malley with John O'Donoghue on Breaks and the brothers Joe and Patrick Mullins rounding out the crew.

== Background ==
The Olympic Council of Ireland was first recognized by the International Olympic Committee on 31 December 1921. With the exception of the 1936 Summer Olympics they have entered a team in every Summer Olympic Games since. However, Ireland did not join Winter Olympics competition until the 1992 Winter Olympics, and Turin was marking their fourth appearance at a Winter Games, having skipped the 1994 Lillehammer Olympics. The Irish delegation to Turin consisted of four athletes, two alpine skiers, one cross-country skier, and one skeleton racer. All four of Ireland's athletes at Turin were first-time Olympians. Alpine skier Kirsten McGarry was the flag bearer for the opening ceremony and cross-country skier Rory Morrish was selected as the flag bearer for the closing ceremony.

== Alpine skiing ==
Thomas Foley was 26 years old at the time of the Turin Olympics. His only event, the men's giant slalom, was held on 20 February. He finished the first run in a time of 1 minute and 28.28 seconds, and the second in 1 minute and 29.14 seconds. His combined time was 2 minutes and 57.42 seconds, good for 31st place out of 41 competitors who finished both legs of the race. The gold medal was won by Benjamin Raich of Austria in a time of 2 minutes and 35 seconds, the silver medal was taken by Joël Chenal of France and the bronze by Austrian Hermann Maier.

Kirsten McGarry was 20 years old at the time of these Olympics, and would later represent Ireland again at the 2010 Winter Olympics. She described herself as "very nervous" coming into the Olympics. She was scheduled to compete in the women's super-G but ultimately did not start the race, as the weather conditions were poor and the Super-G was not considered her best discipline. The gold medal was won by Austrian Michaela Dorfmeister, the silver by Croatian Janica Kostelić and the bronze was taken by Austrian Alexandra Meissnitzer. On 22 February, she did compete in the women's slalom, posting run times of 49.64 seconds and 52.79 seconds. Her combined time of 1 minute and 42.43 seconds put her in 42nd place, out of 51 competitors who finished both legs of the race; the gold medal was won by Sweden's Anja Pärson in 1 minute and 29.04 seconds, the silver and bronze medals were taken by two Austrians, Nicole Hosp and Marlies Schild. She also participated in the women's giant slalom on 24 February. She posted a first run time of 1 minute and 8.19 seconds and completed her second run in 1 minute and 14.68 seconds. McGarry's total time was 2 minutes and 22.87 seconds, which was good for 32nd place out of 43 classified finishers. Gold was won by Julia Mancuso of the United States in 2 minutes and 9.19 seconds, silver by Tanja Poutiainen of Finland, and bronze was taken by Sweden's Anna Ottosson.

Athlete	Event	Final				
Athlete	Event	Run 1	Run 2	Run 3	Total	Rank
Thomas Foley	Men's giant slalom	1:28.28	1:29.14	n/a	2:57.42	31
Kirsten McGarry	Women's super-G	did not start				
Kirsten McGarry	Women's giant slalom	1:08.19	1:14.68	n/a	2:22.87	32
Kirsten McGarry	Women's slalom	49.64	52.79	n/a	1:42.43	42

== Cross-country skiing ==
Rory Morrish was 38 years old at the time of these Olympics. He came to the sport of cross-country skiing after previously competing at the world championships in ski-orienteering. In the men's 15 kilometre classical he finished with a time of 50 minutes and 28.1 seconds, which saw him ranked 87th out of 96 classified finishers. The gold medal was won by Estonia's Andrus Veerpalu in 38 minutes and 1.3 seconds, the silver was won by Lukáš Bauer of the Czech Republic and bronze by the German Tobias Angerer.

Athlete	Event	Final	
Athlete	Event	Total	Rank
Rory Morrish	Men's 15 km classical	50:28.1	87

== Skeleton ==
David Connolly was 25 years old at the time of the Turin Olympics. In the men's skeleton held on 17 February, he finished his first run in 59.97 seconds, and his second in one minute flat. His total time of 1 minute and 59.97 seconds put him in 20th place out of 27 competitors in the event. The gold medal was won by Canada's Duff Gibson in 1 minute and 55.88 seconds, the silver by fellow Canadian Jeff Pain, and the bronze was taken by Gregor Stähli of Switzerland.

Athlete	Event	Final			
Athlete	Event	Run 1	Run 2	Total	Rank
David Connolly	Men's	59.97	1:00.00	1:59.97	20
