= Ireland at the Olympics =

- IOC code: IRL
- NOC: Olympic Federation of Ireland
- Website: olympics.ie
- Medals Ranked 50th: Gold 15 Silver 10 Bronze 17 Total 42

Summer appearances
- 1924; 1928; 1932; 1936; 1948; 1952; 1956; 1960; 1964; 1968; 1972; 1976; 1980; 1984; 1988; 1992; 1996; 2000; 2004; 2008; 2012; 2016; 2020; 2024; 2028

Winter appearances
- 1992; 1994; 1998; 2002; 2006; 2010; 2014; 2018; 2022; 2026

Other related appearances
- Great Britain (1896–1920)

A team representing Ireland as an independent state or polity has competed at the Summer Olympic Games since 1924, and at the Winter Olympic Games since 1992.

The National Olympic Committee in Ireland has been known by three titles. It was originally called the Irish Olympic Council (IOC) from 1920 to 1952 (not to be confused with the International Olympic Committee, also abbreviated as IOC). It became the Olympic Council of Ireland (OCI) from 1952 to 2018. It then became the Olympic Federation of Ireland (OFI) in 2018.

The Irish Olympic Council was formed in 1922 (Note: "OCI History". Olympics.ie. Archived from the original on 7 May 2013. "Ireland was given formal recognition as an independent nation in the Olympic Movement at the IOC session in Paris in 1924 and it was at the Paris Games that Ireland made its first appearance in an Olympic Games as an independent nation.", Olympic Council of Ireland) during the provisional administration prior to the formal establishment of the Irish Free State. The Irish Olympic Council (IOC) affiliated to the International Olympic Committee (also "IOC") in time for the Paris games in 1924.

For many sports, the respective national federation represents the entire island of Ireland, which comprises both the Republic of Ireland (originally a dominion with the title the Irish Free State) and Northern Ireland (which following the founding of the Irish Free State as an independent dominion remained part of the United Kingdom). Northern Ireland-born athletes are entitled to represent either Ireland or Great Britain and Northern Ireland, as they are automatically entitled to the citizenship of both countries. As a result, athletes will tend to represent the National Olympic Committee of the nation to which their sport federation is aligned. The smaller competition pool will also see athletes choose to represent Ireland to ensure greater Olympic qualification chances, although athletes may also move in the opposite direction to increase medal chances, especially in team events. A number of athletes have represented both nations.

In addition, Ireland has regularly been represented by members of the Irish diaspora who are explicitly recognised in the nation's constitution, and who often have citizenship rights through family heritage, i.e. a parent or grandparent with Irish citizenship.

From the first modern-era games in 1896 until the 1920 games, Ireland was represented by the Great Britain and Ireland team. In early editions of the Games, 'Ireland' as a team was entered in certain events as one of several Great Britain and Ireland entries that mirrored the Home Nations. Ireland was one of the nations that boycotted neither the 1980 Moscow nor the 1984 Los Angeles Games. Ireland did, however, boycott the 1936 Berlin Games in protest at a 1935 IOC ruling that restricted the Irish Olympic Council's jurisdiction from the entire island to the territory of the Irish Free State.

The 2024 Summer Olympics was the most successful Olympics in the history of the nation, with Ireland breaking their previous record medal haul of 6 at London 2012 with a total of 7 medals won. The team also surpassed the Atlanta 1996 record of 3 Olympics golds at a Games, including both a first Olympic medal and Olympic gold medal in gymnastics as well as a first ever gold in men's swimming. The 2024 Paris Games also marked 100 years since Ireland's first appearance at the Summer Games.

Irish universities have sent many graduates to the Olympics. Trinity College Dublin has produced 63 Olympians, as of 2023.

The highest number of golds achieved in a particular Olympic games is four, which was achieved at Paris 2024 with gold medals in swimming, rowing, gymnastics and boxing.

Boxing is Ireland's most successful sport at the Games, accounting for more than 50% of the medals won. Athletics, boxing and swimming have provided the most gold medals, with four.

Many of the sports most popular in Ireland are either not Olympic sports (such as Gaelic games, horse racing) or have only become so relative recently (golf, rugby sevens), and this is reflected in the overall record for Ireland at the Games outside of boxing.

== Timeline of participation ==
Olympic Years	Teams	
1896–1920	Great Britain	
1924–present	Great Britain	Ireland

== Medal tables ==
=== Medals by Summer Games ===
Games	Athletes	Gold	Silver	Bronze	Total	Rank
1896–1920	as part of Great Britain					
(French Third Republic) 1924 Paris ^{[Art]}	49	0	0	0	0	–
(Netherlands) 1928 Amsterdam	29	1	0	0	1	24
(United States) 1932 Los Angeles	8	2	0	0	2	16
(Nazi Germany) 1936 Berlin	did not participate					
(United Kingdom) 1948 London ^{[Art]}	72	0	0	0	0	–
(Finland) 1952 Helsinki	19	0	1	0	1	34
(Australia) 1956 Melbourne	18	1	1	3	5	21
(Italy) 1960 Rome	49	0	0	0	0	–
(Japan) 1964 Tokyo	25	0	0	1	1	35
1968 Mexico City	31	0	0	0	0	–
(West Germany) 1972 Munich	59	0	0	0	0	–
(Canada) 1976 Montreal	44	0	0	0	0	–
(Soviet Union) 1980 Moscow	47	0	1	1	2	31
(United States) 1984 Los Angeles	42	0	1	0	1	33
(South Korea) 1988 Seoul	61	0	0	0	0	–
(Spain) 1992 Barcelona	58	1	1	0	2	32
(United States) 1996 Atlanta	78	3	0	1	4	28
(Australia) 2000 Sydney	64	0	1	0	1	64
(Greece) 2004 Athens	46	0	0	0	0	–
(China) 2008 Beijing	54	0	1	2	3	61
(United Kingdom) 2012 London	66	1	1	4	6	41
(Brazil) 2016 Rio de Janeiro	77	0	2	0	2	62
(Japan) 2020 Tokyo	116	2	0	2	4	39
(France) 2024 Paris	134	4	0	3	7	19
(United States) 2028 Los Angeles	future event					
(Australia) 2032 Brisbane	future event					
Total (23/30)	1,246	15	10	17	42	50

- ^{Art comp.} Art competitions (1912–1948) are not included in the medal table above, as they were non-sports events formerly part of the Olympic Games. (Note: In 1952, art competition medals, as well as the gold medal awards for feats in alpinism and aeronautics, were removed from the official national medal counts. Only since 2021 have they been officially listed again by the IOC in the medal tables and respective NOC profile on its website. Ireland won a total of three art competition medals (1 silver, and 2 bronze), across the 1924 and 1948 Summer Olympics.) Ireland won a total of three art competition medals (1 silver, and 2 bronze), across the 1924 and 1948 Summer Olympics.

=== Medals by Winter Games ===
Games	Athletes	Gold	Silver	Bronze	Total	Rank
(France) 1992 Albertville	4	0	0	0	0	–
(Norway) 1994 Lillehammer	did not participate					
(Japan) 1998 Nagano	6	0	0	0	0	–
(United States) 2002 Salt Lake City	6	0	0	0	0	–
(Italy) 2006 Turin	4	0	0	0	0	–
(Canada) 2010 Vancouver	6	0	0	0	0	–
(Russia) 2014 Sochi	5	0	0	0	0	–
(South Korea) 2018 Pyeongchang	5	0	0	0	0	–
(China) 2022 Beijing	6	0	0	0	0	–
(Italy) 2026 Milano Cortina	4	0	0	0	0	–
(France) 2030 French Alps	future event					
(United States) 2034 Utah	future event					
Total (9/25)	46	0	0	0	0	–

=== Medals by summer sport ===
Sport	Gold	Silver	Bronze	Total
Boxing	4	5	10	19
Athletics	4	2	1	7
Swimming	4	0	3	7
Rowing	2	1	2	5
Gymnastics	1	0	0	1
Sailing	0	2	0	2
Equestrian	0	0	1	1
Totals (7 entries)	15	10	17	42

=== Medals by winter sport ===
As of the 2022 Beijing Games, Ireland's best result at the Winter Games has been fourth, by Clifton Wrottesley in the Men's Skeleton at the 2002 Games in Salt Lake City.

== List of medallists ==
The following tables include medals won by athletes on OFI teams. All medals have been won at Summer Games. Ireland's best result at the Winter Games has been fourth, by Clifton Wrottesley in the Men's Skeleton at the 2002 Games in Salt Lake City.

Some athletes have won medals representing other countries, most obviously Great Britain, which are not included on these tables, and emigrant Irish throwing athletes were particularly successful competing for the United States in early Games. The most notable of the Irish athletes for other nations, however, is Tom Kiely, who won gold in the all-around athletics event in 1904, having refused offers of a free trip and reimbursement of travel expenses from British and American officials, paid his own way, and was insistent that he represented Ireland, even so far as attempting to replace the Union Flag with its Irish equivalent at the medal ceremony. The disputed nationality of Kiely has historic statistical importance in both British Olympicism, and Olympicism generally, because it is his gold medal that allows Great Britain to claim to be the only nation to have won at least one gold at every Summer Games.

=== Medallists ===
Medal	Name	Games	Sport	Event
Gold	Pat O'Callaghan	1928 Amsterdam	Athletics	Men's hammer throw
Gold	Bob Tisdall	1932 Los Angeles	Athletics	Men's 400 metre hurdles
Gold	Pat O'Callaghan	1932 Los Angeles	Athletics	Men's hammer throw
Silver	John McNally	1952 Helsinki	Boxing	Men's bantamweight
Gold	Ronnie Delany	1956 Melbourne	Athletics	Men's 1500 metres
Silver	Fred Tiedt	1956 Melbourne	Boxing	Men's welterweight
Bronze	John Caldwell	1956 Melbourne	Boxing	Men's flyweight
Bronze	Freddie Gilroy	1956 Melbourne	Boxing	Men's bantamweight
Bronze	Anthony Byrne	1956 Melbourne	Boxing	Men's lightweight
Bronze	Jim McCourt	1964 Tokyo	Boxing	Men's lightweight
Bronze	Hugh Russell	1980 Moscow	Boxing	Men's flyweight
Silver	David Wilkins; James Wilkinson	1980 Moscow	Sailing	Flying Dutchman class
Silver	John Treacy	1984 Los Angeles	Athletics	Men's marathon
Gold	Michael Carruth	1992 Barcelona	Boxing	Men's welterweight
Silver	Wayne McCullough	1992 Barcelona	Boxing	Men's bantamweight
Gold	Michelle Smith	1996 Atlanta	Swimming	Women's 400 metre freestyle
Gold	Michelle Smith	1996 Atlanta	Swimming	Women's 200 metre individual medley
Gold	Michelle Smith	1996 Atlanta	Swimming	Women's 400 metre individual medley
Bronze	Michelle Smith	1996 Atlanta	Swimming	Women's 200 metre butterfly
Silver	Sonia O'Sullivan	2000 Sydney	Athletics	Women's 5000 metres
Silver	Kenny Egan	2008 Beijing	Boxing	Men's Light Heavyweight
Bronze	Paddy Barnes	2008 Beijing	Boxing	Men's Light flyweight
Bronze	Darren Sutherland	2008 Beijing	Boxing	Men's Middleweight
Gold	Katie Taylor	2012 London	Boxing	Women's lightweight
Silver	John Joe Nevin	2012 London	Boxing	Men's Bantamweight
Bronze	Paddy Barnes	2012 London	Boxing	Men's Light flyweight
Bronze	Michael Conlan	2012 London	Boxing	Men's flyweight
Bronze	Cian O'Connor	2012 London	Equestrian	Individual Showjumping
Bronze	Robert Heffernan	2012 London	Athletics	Men's 50 kilometres walk
Silver	Gary O'Donovan; Paul O'Donovan	2016 Rio de Janeiro	Rowing	Men's lightweight double sculls
Silver	Annalise Murphy	2016 Rio de Janeiro	Sailing	Women's Laser Radial
Gold	Fintan McCarthy; Paul O'Donovan	2020 Tokyo	Rowing	Men's lightweight double sculls
Gold	Kellie Harrington	2020 Tokyo	Boxing	Women's lightweight
Bronze	Aidan Walsh	2020 Tokyo	Boxing	Men's welterweight
Bronze	Aifric Keogh; Eimear Lambe; Fiona Murtagh; Emily Hegarty	2020 Tokyo	Rowing	Women's coxless four
Gold	Fintan McCarthy; Paul O'Donovan	2024 Paris	Rowing	Men's lightweight double sculls
Gold	Rhys McClenaghan	2024 Paris	Gymnastics	Pommel Horse
Gold	Daniel Wiffen	2024 Paris	Swimming	Men's 800 metre freestyle
Gold	Kellie Harrington	2024 Paris	Boxing	Women's 60 kg
Bronze	Daniel Wiffen	2024 Paris	Swimming	Men's 1500 metre freestyle
Bronze	Daire Lynch; Philip Doyle	2024 Paris	Rowing	Men's double sculls
Bronze	Mona McSharry	2024 Paris	Swimming	Women's 100 metre breaststroke

=== Doping ===
Awarded:

- Robert Heffernan finished fourth in the 2012 men's 50 kilometres walk won by Sergey Kirdyapkin. On 24 March 2016, the Court of Arbitration for Sport disqualified all Kirdyapkin's competitive results from 20 August 2009 to 15 October 2012. Heffernan was upgraded to third, and formally presented with a bronze medal in November 2016.

Stripped:

- Cian O'Connor received the gold medal in the 2004 individual showjumping, but was formally stripped of it in July 2005 because his horse failed the post-event doping test.

Banned:

- Michelle Smith de Bruin won three gold medals at the 1996 Summer Olympics in Atlanta, for the 400 m individual medley, 400 m freestyle and 200 m individual medley, and also won the bronze medal for the 200 m butterfly event. Smith's career was marked by allegations of doping, which were never proven. Smith was later banned for four years by FINA, the international swimming federation, for manipulation of an anti-doping sample by deliberate contamination with alcohol, a decision upheld by the Court of Arbitration for Sport when Smith appealed.

=== Medallists in art competitions ===
Art competitions were held from 1912 to 1948. Irish entries first appeared in 1924, when they won two medals; a third was won in the 1948 competition.

Medal	Name	Games	Event	Piece
Silver	Jack Butler Yeats	1924 Paris	Mixed Painting	Natation ("Swimming"; now on display in the National Gallery of Ireland with the title The Liffey Swim)
Bronze	Oliver St. John Gogarty	1924 Paris	Mixed Literature	Ode pour les Jeux de Tailteann (Tailteann Ode, which had won the prize for poetry at the revived Tailteann Games earlier that year) Gogarty was awarded a bronze medal despite two silver medals being awarded in the category.
Bronze	Letitia Marion Hamilton	1948 London	Paintings	Meath Hunt Point-to-Point Races (a painting in 2012 "believed to be somewhere in the United States")

== Before independence ==
Prior to 1922, Ireland was part of the United Kingdom of Great Britain and Ireland: thus, competitors at earlier Games who were born and living in Ireland are counted as British in Olympic statistics. At early Olympics, Irish-born athletes also won numerous medals for the United States and Canada, notably the "Irish Whales" in throwing events.

The Irish Amateur Athletic Association was invited to the inaugural International Olympic Committee meeting in 1894, and may have been invited to the 1896 games: it has also been claimed the Gaelic Athletic Association was invited. In the event, neither participated.

Prior to the 1906 Intercalated Games, National Olympic Committees (NOCs) were generally non-existent, and athletes could enter the Olympics individually. John Pius Boland, who won gold in two tennis events in 1896, is now listed as "IRL/GBR". Boland's daughter later claimed that he had objected when the Union Jack was raised to mark his first triumph, vehemently pointing out that Ireland had a flag of its own; following this, the organisers apologised and agreed to prepare an Irish flag. While Kevin MacCarthy is sceptical of this story, by 1906, Boland was crediting his medals to Ireland.

Tom Kiely, who won the "all-around" athletics competition at the 1904 Olympics in St Louis is also listed as competing for Great Britain. He had raised funds in counties Tipperary and Waterford to travel independently and compete for Ireland. American statistician Frank Zarnowski does not regard the 1904 event as part of the Olympic competition, and also doubts the story that Kiely had refused offers by both the English Amateur Athletic Association (AAA) and the New York Athletic Club to pay his fare and cover his travel expenses so he could compete for them. British historian Peter Lovesey disagrees with Zarnowski.

The British Olympic Association (BOA) was formed in 1905, and Irish athletes were accredited to the BOA team from the 1906 Games onwards. Whereas Pierre de Coubertin had recognised teams from Bohemia and Finland separately from their respective imperial powers, Austria and Russia, he was unwilling to make any similar distinction for Ireland, either because it lacked a National Olympic Committee, or for fear of offending Britain.

At the 1906 Games, both Peter O'Connor and Con Leahy objected when the British flag was raised at their victory ceremony, and O'Connor raised a green Irish flag in defiance of the organisers.

At the 1908 Games in London, there were multiple BOA entries in several team events, including two representing Ireland. In the hockey tournament, the Irish team finished second, behind England and ahead of Scotland and Wales. The Irish polo team also finished joint second in the three-team tournament, despite losing to one of two English teams in its only match.

At the 1912 Olympics, and despite objections from other countries, the BOA entered three teams in the cycling events, one from each of the separate English, Scottish and Irish governing bodies for the sport. The Irish team came 11th in the team time trial. The organisers had proposed a similar division in the football tournament, but the BOA declined.

A 1913 list of 35 countries to be invited to the 1916 Olympics included Ireland separately from Great Britain; similarly, Finland and Hungary were to be separate from Russia and Austria, although Bohemia was not listed. A newspaper report of the 1914 Olympic Congress says it endorsed a controversial German Olympic Committee proposal that "now—contrary to the hitherto existing practice—only political nations may participate as teams in the Olympic Games", with the "United Kingdom of Great Britain and Ireland" among these "political nations". However, the games were cancelled due to the First World War.

After the war, John J. Keane attempted to unite various sports associations under an Irish Olympic Committee. Many sports had rival bodies, one Unionist and affiliated to a United Kingdom parent, the other Republican and opposed to any link with Great Britain. Keane proposed that a separate Irish delegation, marching under the Union Flag, should participate at the 1920 Summer Olympics in Antwerp. At the time the Irish War of Independence was under way, and the IOC rejected Keane's proposal, pending the settlement of the underlying political situation.

== Political issues ==
The OFI has always used the name "Ireland", and has claimed to represent the entire island of Ireland, even though Northern Ireland remains part of the United Kingdom. These points have been contentious, particularly from the 1930s to the 1950s in athletics, and until the 1970s in cycling.

=== Northern Ireland ===
Proposed Olympic flag for Ireland, the arms of Ireland.

Many sports were codified and organised for the first time in the late nineteenth and early twentieth century, and many of them were first done so within the then United Kingdom of Great Britain and Ireland. Early international sport was often played between representative teams of the constituent countries of the United Kingdom, and sports organised themselves with separate bodies for those countries. The governing bodies of many sports in the island of Ireland had been established decades prior to the 1922 partition, and most have remained as single all-island bodies since then with the singular exception of football.

Recognition of the Irish border was politically contentious and unpopular with Irish nationalists. The National Athletic and Cycling Association (Ireland), or NACA(I), was formed in 1922 by the merger of rival all-island associations, and affiliated to both the International Amateur Athletics Federation (IAAF) and Union Cycliste Internationale (UCI). When Northern Ireland athletes were selected for the 1928 games, the possibility was raised of using an "all-Ireland banner" as the team flag, rather than the Irish tricolour which unionists disavowed. J. J. Keane stated that it was too late to change the flag registered with the IOC, but was hopeful that the coat of arms of Ireland would be adopted afterwards. No such change was ever made, although Keane reported in 1930 that a council subcommittee had consulted the member federations and noted "a general desire towards agreement on a flag which would be acceptable to all parts of Ireland being substituted for that at present recognised ... by the International Olympic Committee [i.e. the tricolour]".

In 1925, some Northern Ireland athletics clubs left NACA(I) and in 1930 formed the Northern Ireland Amateur Athletics Association, which later formed the British Athletic Federation (BAF) with the English and Scottish Amateur Athletics Associations. The BAF then replaced the (English) AAA as Britain's member of the IAAF, and moved that all members should be delimited by political boundaries. This was not agreed in time for the 1932 Summer Olympics —at which two NACA(I) athletes won gold medals for Ireland— but was agreed at the IAAF's 1934 congress. The NACA(I) refused to comply and was suspended in 1935, thus missing the 1936 Berlin Olympics. The OCI decided to boycott the Games completely in protest. The UCI likewise suspended the NACA(I) for refusing to confine itself to the Irish Free State. The athletics and cycling wings of the NACA(I) split into two all-island bodies, and separate Irish Free State bodies split from each and secured affiliation to the IAAF and UCI. These splits were not fully resolved until the 1990s. The "partitionist" Amateur Athletic Union of Éire (AAUE) affiliated to the IAAF, but the all-Ireland NACA(I) remained affiliated to the OCI. In 1939, IOC President Henri de Baillet-Latour said that, on the precedent of "Bohemia and Finland in the old days", an all-island "Ireland" team would be permitted, but only if the BOA and British government agreed.

At the 1948 Summer Olympics in London, the athletics events saw two rival Ireland squads: one nominated by the NACA(I) and approved by the OCI, the other nominated by the AAUE and approved by the IAAF. Neither had the complete set of authorisations technically required for entry; just before the opening ceremony, the IOC and London organising committee jointly decided to disallow the NACA/OCI athletes and permit those from the AAUE/IAAF, who were shunned by the rest of the 1948 Ireland delegation. NACA(I) nominees were similarly refused entry in the cycling events. In the swimming events, two swimmers from Northern Ireland were prevented from competing for Ireland despite having Irish passports. The entire swimming squad withdrew, but the rest of the team competed. This was a ruling by FINA (the swimming international federation) rather than the IOC; Northern Ireland athletes competed for Ireland in boxing, football, and rowing. Some athletes born in what had become the Republic of Ireland continued to compete for the British team.

In 1952, new IOC President Avery Brundage and new OCI delegate Lord Killanin agreed that people from Northern Ireland would in the future be allowed to compete in any sport on the OCI team. Brundage's predecessor Sigfrid Edström had been sympathetic to the BOA. In Irish nationality law, birth in Northern Ireland with a parent entitled to Irish citizenship grants a citizenship entitlement, similar to birth within the Republic of Ireland itself. In 1956, Killanin stated that both the OCI and the BOA "quite rightly" judged eligibility based on citizenship laws. UCI and IAAF affiliated bodies were subsequently affiliated to the OCI, thus regularising the position of Irish competitors in those sports at the Olympics. Members of the all-Ireland National Cycling Association (NCA) with Irish Republican sympathies twice interfered with the Olympic road race in protest against the UCI-affiliated Irish Cycling Federation (ICF). In 1956, three members caused a 13-minute delay at the start. Seven were arrested in 1972; three had delayed the start and the other four joined mid-race to ambush ICF competitor Noel Taggart, causing a minor pileup. This happened days after the murders of Israeli athletes and at the height of the Troubles in Northern Ireland; the negative publicity helped precipitate an end to the NCA–ICF feud.

The Irish Hockey Union joined the OCI in 1949, and the Ireland team in non-Olympic competitions is selected on an all-island basis. Until 1992 the IHU was not invited to the Olympic hockey tournament, while Northern Irish hockey players like Stephen Martin played on the British Olympic men's team. In 1992, invitation was replaced by an Olympic qualifying tournament, which the IHU/IHA has entered, despite some opposition from Northern Irish members. Northern Irish players can play for Ireland or Britain, and can switch affiliation subject to International Hockey Federation clearance. The Irish Ladies Hockey Union has entered the Olympics since 1984, and in 1980 suspended Northern Irish players who elected to play for the British women's team. The Ireland women's hockey team finally qualified for the 2020 Summer Olympics; the men followed them in 2024.

Through to the 1960s, Ireland was represented in showjumping only by members of the Irish Army Equitation School, as the all-island civilian equestrian governing body was unwilling to compete under the Republic's flag and anthem.

In November 2003, the OCI discovered that the British Olympic Association (BOA) had been using Northern Ireland in the text of its "Team Members Agreement" document since the 2002 Games. Its objection was made public in January 2004. The BOA responded that "Unbeknown to each other both the OCI and BOA have constitutions approved by the IOC acknowledging territorial responsibility for Northern Ireland", the BOA constitution dating from 1981. OCI president Pat Hickey claimed the IOC's copy of the BOA constitution had "question marks" against mentions of Northern Ireland (and Gibraltar); an IOC spokesperson said "Through an error we have given both national Olympic committees rights over the same area." The 2012 Games host was to be selected in July 2004 and so, to prevent the dispute harming the London bid, its director Barbara Cassani and the Blair government secured agreement by which Northern Ireland was removed from BOA documents and marketing materials. Northern Ireland athletes retain the right to compete for Britain.

Most commonly held passport in Northern Ireland (2011 Census)

In October 2004, Lord McIntosh of Haringey told the House of Lords:

The longstanding practice relating to athletes in Northern Ireland who qualify for participation at the Olympic Games is that an athlete born in Northern Ireland who qualifies for participation at the Olympic Games and who holds a UK passport, may opt for selection by either Team GB or Ireland. The British Olympic Association (BOA) and the Olympic Council for Ireland (OCI) have recently confirmed this agreement.

By contrast, OCI officers Pat Hickey and Dermot Sherlock told an Oireachtas committee in 2008:

If someone is entitled to an Irish passport and is in possession of that passport, he or she can qualify to compete for Ireland as long as he or she has not competed for some other country in a previous Olympic Games. If he or she had competed for another country previously, we might allow him or her to compete for Ireland...The Irish passport is used as the measurement.[...]As people from Northern Ireland can choose whether to have an Irish or a British passport, or both, athletes from that part of the world can choose whether to compete for Ireland or Britain.

The Irish have a long established record of encouraging athletes with direct Irish heritage to represent the nation under 'grandparent' citizenship rules, and the Irish Diaspora, including the large number of Irish heritage people in Great Britain, is explicitly recognised in the Irish constitution. However, the right of people from Northern Ireland to represent Ireland is treated as a birthright, and such an athlete does not need to 'transfer' allegiance in the same way unless they have already represented another country.

Hickey also said:

The council is proud that, like the Irish rugby team, it represents the island of Ireland. Ireland is unusual, in Olympic terms. The council is not the Olympic committee of the Republic of Ireland – it is the Olympic Council of Ireland. We have responsibility for the North of Ireland. We can thank my predecessor, Lord Killanin, for that.

In 2012, Stephen Martin, who has been an executive at both the OCI and the BOA, said "Team GB is a brand name. Just like Team Ireland. The British and Irish Olympic committees are seen by the International Olympic Committees as having joint rights over Northern Ireland."

In 2009, rugby sevens was added to the Olympic programme starting in 2016. While World Rugby states players from Northern Ireland are eligible to compete on the Great Britain team, the Irish Rugby Football Union (IRFU) director of rugby said in 2011 that "with the agreement of the [English, Scottish, and Welsh] unions" the "de facto position" was that Northern Ireland players must represent an IRFU team. In 2010 The Daily Telegraph opined that the IRFU would be entitled to refuse to release players under contract to it, but not to prohibit Northern Ireland players based outside Ireland; but that the issue needed to be handled "with extreme sensitivity". As of 2024, two Northern Ireland players (Zac Ward and Ashleigh Orchard) have played for Ireland, none for Great Britain.

=== Name of the country ===
The OFI sees itself as representing the island rather than the state, and hence uses the name "Ireland". It changed its own name from "Irish Olympic Council" to "Olympic Council of Ireland" in 1952 to reinforce this point. (The change from "Council" to "Federation" was a 2018 rebranding after the 2016 ticketing controversy.) At the time, Lord Killanin had become OCI President and delegate to the IOC, and was trying to reverse the IOC's policy of referring to the OCI's team by using an appellation of the state rather than the island. While the name "Ireland" had been unproblematic at the 1924 and 1928 Games, after 1930, the IOC sometimes used "Irish Free State". IOC President Henri de Baillet-Latour supported the principle of delimitation by political borders. At the 1932 Games, Eoin O'Duffy an IRA member, persuaded the Organisers to switch from "Irish Free State" to "Ireland" shortly before the Opening Ceremony. After the 1937 Constitution took effect, the IOC switched to "Eire"; this conformed to British practice, although within the state's name in English was "Ireland". At the opening ceremony of the 1948 Summer Olympics, teams marched in alphabetical order of their country's name in English; the OCI team was told to move from the I's to the E's. After the Republic of Ireland Act came into effect in 1949, British policy was to use "Republic of Ireland" rather than "Eire". In 1951, the IOC made the same switch at its Vienna conference, after IOC member Lord Burghley had consulted the British Foreign Office. An OCI request to change this to "Ireland" was rejected in 1952, In late 1955 Brundage ruled that "Ireland" would be the official IOC name, and Lewis Luxton of the Organising Committee for the 1956 Melbourne Games said that "Ireland" would be used on scoreboards and programmes. The OCI had argued that this was the name in the state's own Constitution, and that all the OCI's affiliated sports except the Football Association of Ireland were all-island bodies. However, in the buildup to the Games, Lord Burghley (now Marquess of Exeter) protested at the IOC decision and insisted that the athletics events would use the IAAF name of "Eire". On the first day of athletics, "Ireland" (code "IRE") was used, but from the second day it changed to "Eire"/"EIR".

== See also ==
- List of flag bearers for Ireland at the Olympics
- Category:Olympic competitors for Ireland
- Ireland at the Paralympics
- Ireland at the British Empire Games
- 2016 Summer Olympics ticket scandal
