= David Connolly (disambiguation) =

David Connolly (born 1977) is an Irish professional footballer.

David Connolly may also refer to:

- David Connolly (skeleton racer) (born 1980), Irish skeleton racer
- David Connolly (translator) (born 1954), English-born Greek literary translator
- David Connolly (cattleman), Australian pastoralist and NT Administrator
- David Connolly (politician) (born 1939), Australian politician
- David W. Connolly (born 1968), Canadian choreographer
- Dave Connolly, see NHRA U.S. Nationals
