= Bobsleigh at the 1998 Winter Olympics – Two-man =

Two-man at the XVIII Olympic Winter Games
- Venue: Spiral
- Dates: February 14 — 15, 1998
- Competitors: 76 from 24 nations
- Winning time: 3:37.24

Medalists
1st place, gold medalist(s)		Italy; Günther Huber, Antonio Tartaglia
1st place, gold medalist(s)		Canada; Pierre Lueders, Dave MacEachern
3rd place, bronze medalist(s)		Germany; Christoph Langen, Markus Zimmermann

The Two-man bobsleigh competition at the 1998 Winter Olympics in Nagano was held on 14 and 15 February, at Spiral. Huber lead Lueders by 0.05 seconds after the first run. Leuders picked up 0.02 seconds in the next two runs. Prior to the start of the fourth run, Lueders turned to Huber and asked "Can you imagine if we tied this thing?" After the fourth run, Tartaglia stated "In the end, it felt like were friends who had accomplished something together."

== Results ==
Rank	Country	Athletes	Run 1	Run 2	Run 3	Run 4	Total
1st place, gold medalist(s)	Italy (ITA-1)	Günther Huber; Antonio Tartaglia	54.51	54.29	54.17	54.27	3:37.24
1st place, gold medalist(s)	Canada (CAN-1)	Pierre Lueders; Dave MacEachern	54.56	54.28	54.16	54.24	3:37.24
3rd place, bronze medalist(s)	Germany (GER-1)	Christoph Langen; Markus Zimmermann	54.82	54.62	54.11	54.34	3:37.89
4	Switzerland (SUI-2)	Christian Reich; Cédric Grand	54.73	54.56	54.32	54.54	3:38.15
5	Latvia (LAT-1)	Sandis Prūsis; Jānis Elsiņš	54.91	54.52	54.29	54.52	3:38.24
6	Switzerland (SUI-1)	Reto Götschi; Guido Acklin	54.71	54.77	54.44	54.35	3:38.27
7	United States (USA-2)	Jim Herberich; Robert Olesen	54.91	54.70	54.46	54.46	3:38.53
8	Czech Republic (CZE-2)	Pavel Puškár; Jan Kobián	54.99	54.60	54.46	54.54	3:38.59
9	France (FRA-1)	Bruno Mingeon; Emmanuel Hostache	54.80	54.65	54.55	54.62	3:38.62
10	United States (USA-1)	Brian Shimer; Garrett Hines	54.88	54.79	54.42	54.66	3:38.75
11	Germany (GER-2)	Dirk Wiese; Marco Jakobs	54.83	54.66	54.63	54.76	3:38.88
12	Canada (CAN-2)	Chris Lori; Jack Pyc	54.76	54.72	54.71	54.79	3:38.98
13	France (FRA-2)	Éric Alard; Éric Le Chanony	55.25	54.75	54.73	54.58	3:39.31
14	Italy (ITA-2)	Fabrizio Tosini; Enrico Costa	55.07	54.79	54.80	54.95	3:39.61
15	Great Britain (GBR-1)	Sean Olsson; Lenox Paul	55.24	55.12	54.85	54.73	3:39.94
16	Russia (RUS-1)	Pavel Shcheglovsky; Konstantin Dyomin	55.41	55.09	54.84	54.97	3:40.31
17	Japan (JPN-1)	Naomi Takewaki; Hiroaki Ohishi	55.31	55.24	55.20	54.96	3:40.71
18	Latvia (LAT-2)	Rodžers Lodziņš; Māris Rozentāls	55.34	55.25	55.06	55.10	3:40.75
19	Japan (JPN-2)	Hiroshi Suzuki; Masanori Inoue	55.47	55.10	55.19	55.04	3:40.80
20	Great Britain (GBR-2)	Lee Johnston; Eric Sekwalor	55.51	55.19	55.16	55.02	3:40.88
21	Russia (RUS-2)	Yevgeny Popov; Oleg Petrov	55.53	55.37	55.25	55.31	3:41.46
22	Australia	Jason Giobbi; Adam Barclay	55.56	55.47	55.26	55.31	3:41.60
23	Ukraine	Yuriy Panchuk; Oleh Polyvach	55.47	55.36	55.52	55.47	3:41.82
24	Monaco	Gilbert Bessi; Jean-François Calmes	55.89	55.86	55.92	55.87	3:43.54
25	Romania (ROU-1)	Paul Neagu; Gabriel Tătaru	56.38	56.10	55.54	55.64	3:43.66
26	Romania (ROU-2)	Florian Enache; Mihai Dumitrașcu	56.03	55.86	55.97	55.87	3:43.73
27	Ireland (IRL-1)	Jeff Pamplin; Terry McHugh	56.32	56.05	55.99	55.96	3:44.32
28	New Zealand	Alan Henderson; Angus Ross	56.29	56.28	56.12	55.97	3:44.66
29	Jamaica	Devon Harris; Michael Morgan	56.56	56.52	56.36	56.30	3:45.74
30	Greece	Greg Sebald; John-Andrew Kambanis	56.62	57.13	56.45	56.37	3:46.57
31	Bosnia and Herzegovina	Zoran Sokolović; Ognjen Sokolović	57.36	56.62	56.32	56.31	3:46.61
32	Trinidad and Tobago	Gregory Sun; Curtis Harry	56.74	56.78	56.73	56.40	3:46.65
33	Virgin Islands (ISV-1)	Zachary Zoller; Jeff Kromenhoek	56.77	56.90	56.71	56.82	3:47.20
34	Chinese Taipei	Sun Kuang-ming; Cheng Jin-shan	56.84	56.86	56.71	56.93	3:47.34
35	Ireland (IRL-2)	Peter Donohoe; Simon Linscheid	57.03	57.26	56.57	56.59	3:47.45
36	Virgin Islands (ISV-2)	Keith Sudziarski; Todd Schultz	57.06	57.10	56.96	57.19	3:48.31
-	Czech Republic (CZE-1)	Jirí Dzmura; Pavel Polomský	55.30	55.11	DNS	-	-
-	Puerto Rico	John Amabile; Joseph Keosseian	57.35	57.69	DSQ	-	-
-	Austria	Herbert Schoesser; Georg Kuttner	DNS	-	-	-	-
