= Benjamin Lynch =

Irish-Canadian freestyle skier (born 2002)

Ben Lynch
Personal information
- Full name: Benjamin Lynch
- Born: 8 September 2002 (age 24) Dublin, Ireland

Sport
- Country: Ireland
- Sport: Freestyle skiing
- Event: Halfpipe

Achievements and titles
- Olympic finals: 2026

Benjamin "Ben" Lynch (born 8 September 2002) is an Irish freestyle skier who specializes in halfpipe. He represented Ireland at the 2026 Winter Olympics in Milano Cortina.

== Biography ==
Lynch was born in Dublin on 8 September 2002. His father, Kevin Lynch, was a collegiate rower. He moved to Vancouver, Canada at age two and is now based in Calgary. He began competing at the age of 12 for Canada. The International Olympic Committee (IOC) approved his change of nationality from Canada to Ireland for the 2026 Winter Olympics.

As a member of Ireland, Lynch competed in the men's halfpipe at the 2026 Winter Olympics. He was the first Irish person to qualify for the final in a Winter Olympics. He finished in eighth place. He was Ireland's flagbearer for the Olympics closing ceremony that year.
