= Simon Linscheid =

Irish bobsledder

Personal information
- National team: Ireland (Olympics)
- Born: 12 June 1967 (age 59)

Sport
- Sport: Bobsleigh

Simon Linscheid (born 12 June 1967) is an Irish bobsledder. He competed in the two man and the four man events at the 1998 Winter Olympics. Linscheid later became the owner of a greetings card company in Dublin.
