= Thos Foley =

Irish slalom skier (born 1979)

Thos Foley (born 9 November 1979) from Kenmare in County Kerry, Ireland, is a man's slalom skier. He currently lives and trains in the village of Verbier in Switzerland.

== Career ==
He represented Ireland in the 2006 Winter Olympics in Turin, Italy in the men's giant slalom events, placing 31st.

His first international race was a downhill at the '99 British Championships, which were held in France, due to there being no suitable venue available in Great Britain.

His best result was in 2004 when he finished in 2nd place at the Scottish Championships giant slalom in Méribel, France. He represented Ireland at the 2006 Winter Olympics, where he finished 31st in the men's giant slalom.
