= Ireland at the 2022 Winter Olympics =

- Flag of Ireland
- IOC code: IRL
- NOC: Olympic Federation of Ireland
- Website: olympics.ie

in Beijing, China 4–20 February 2022
- Competitors: 6 (4 men and 2 women) in 5 sports
- Flag bearers (opening): Elsa Desmond; Brendan Newby
- Flag bearer (closing): Thomas Hjalmar Westgård
- Medals: Gold 0 Silver 0 Bronze 0 Total 0

Winter Olympics appearances (overview)
- 1992; 1994; 1998; 2002; 2006; 2010; 2014; 2018; 2022; 2026

Ireland competed at the 2022 Winter Olympics in Beijing, China, from 4 to 20 February 2022.

On January 24, 2022, the Irish team of six athletes (four men and two women) competing in five sports was named. Elsa Desmond and Brendan Newby were the country's flagbearer during the opening ceremony. All members of the team are members of the Irish diaspora, who were born or live and train elsewhere. Ireland won no medals; the best finish was Jack Gower in the men's combined alpine skiing, who finished 12th. Meanwhile cross-country skier Thomas Hjalmar Westgård was the flagbearer during the closing ceremony.

== Competitors ==
The following is the list of number of competitors participating at the Games per sport/discipline.

Sport	Men	Women	Total
Alpine skiing	1	1	2
Cross-country skiing	1	0	1
Freestyle skiing	1	0	1
Luge	0	1	1
Snowboarding	1	0	1
Total	4	2	6

== Alpine skiing ==
By meeting the basic qualification standards Ireland qualified one male and one female alpine skier.

Athlete	Event	Run 1		Run 2		Total	
Athlete	Event	Time	Rank	Time	Rank	Time	Rank
Jack Gower	Men's combined	1:45.16	14	52.58	12	2:37.74	12
Jack Gower	Men's downhill	—N/a				1:47.61	31
Jack Gower	Men's giant slalom	1:08.30	31	1:12.26	25	2:20.56	25
Jack Gower	Men's super-G	—N/a				DNF	
Tess Arbez	Women's giant slalom	DNF		Did not advance			
Tess Arbez	Women's slalom	1:07.83	55	1:06.78	48	2:14.61	48
Tess Arbez	Women's super-G	—N/a				1:25.18	42

== Cross-country skiing ==
Ireland qualified three male cross-country skiers but chose to only use one quota.

Distance

Athlete	Event	Classical		Freestyle		Total		
Athlete	Event	Time	Rank	Time	Rank	Time	Deficit	Rank
Thomas Hjalmar Westgård	Men's 15 km classical	—N/a				40:01.5	+2:06.7	14
Thomas Hjalmar Westgård	Men's 30 km skiathlon	43:03.8	42	41:51.7	42	1:25:29.8	+9:20.0	43
Thomas Hjalmar Westgård	Men's 50 km freestyle	—N/a				1:15:59.0	+4:26.3	29

== Freestyle skiing ==
Ireland qualified one male freestyle skier.

Halfpipe

Athlete	Event	Qualification				Final					
Athlete	Event	Run 1		Run 2		Run 1		Run 2		Run 3	
Athlete	Event	Points	Rank	Points	Rank	Points	Rank	Points	Rank	Points	Rank
Brendan Newby	Men's halfpipe	10.75	21	47.00	20	Did not advance					

== Luge ==
Based on the results during the 2021–22 Luge World Cup season, Ireland qualified 1 sled in the women's singles. Elsa Desmond became the first luger to represent Ireland at the Olympics.

Athlete	Event	Run 1		Run 2		Run 3		Run 4		Total	
Athlete	Event	Time	Rank	Time	Rank	Time	Rank	Time	Rank	Time	Rank
Elsa Desmond	Women's singles	1:01.608	33	1:03.857	34	1:02.254	33	Did not advance		3:07.719	33

== Snowboarding ==
Freestyle

Athlete	Event	Qualification				Final				
Athlete	Event	Run 1	Run 2	Best	Rank	Run 1	Run 2	Run 3	Best	Rank
Seamus O'Connor	Men's halfpipe	57.00	10.25	57.00	15	Did not advance				
