= Eric Sekwalor =

British bobsledder

Personal information
- Nationality: British
- Born: 7 June 1964 (age 60); Accra, Ghana

Sport
- Sport: Bobsleigh

Eric Sekwalor (born 7 June 1964) is a British bobsledder. He competed in the two man event at the 1998 Winter Olympics. He was employed by Surrey Police as an officer for a short time in 2018
