= Anabelle Zurbay =

Irish alpine skier (born 2008)

Personal information
- Born: 19 December 2008 (age 17) Minnesota, United States
- Home town: Vail, Colorado, United States

Skiing career
- Country: Ireland
- Sport: Alpine skiing
- Club: Ski and Snowboard Club Vail
- Disciplines: Slalom, giant slalom

Olympics
- Teams: 1 – (2026)
- Medals: 0

Anabelle Zurbay (born 19 December 2008) is an American and Irish alpine ski racer. She competed for Ireland in the women's giant slalom and women's slalom at the 2026 Winter Olympics.

Born in Minnesota and based in Vail, Colorado, she is eligible to represent Ireland through her Westmeath-born grandmother Rosaleen. She was one of the flagbearers for Ireland at the opening ceremony. She finished in 48th place out of 76 athletes in the giant slalom. Three days later, she again finished 48th in the slalom.

The following month, she competed in three events at the 2026 Junior World Championships in Narvik, Norway. She teamed with Eabha McKenna to take 22nd in the team combined and finished in 45th place in the giant slalom. She failed to finish her second run in the slalom.

== Olympic results ==
Year
Year	Age	Slalom	Giant slalom
2026	17	48	48

Olympic Games
Preceded by Sarah Lavin; Shane Lowry	Flagbearer for Ireland; Milano Cortina 2026 with Thomas Maloney Westgård	Succeeded by Incumbent
