= Ireland at the 2010 Winter Olympics =

- IOC code: IRL
- NOC: Olympic Federation of Ireland
- Website: olympics.ie

in Vancouver
- Competitors: 6 in 4 sports
- Flag bearers: Aoife Hoey (opening); Shane O'Connor (closing)
- Medals: Gold 0 Silver 0 Bronze 0 Total 0

Winter Olympics appearances (overview)
- 1992; 1994; 1998; 2002; 2006; 2010; 2014; 2018; 2022; 2026; 2030

Ireland participated in the 2010 Winter Olympics in Vancouver, British Columbia, Canada.

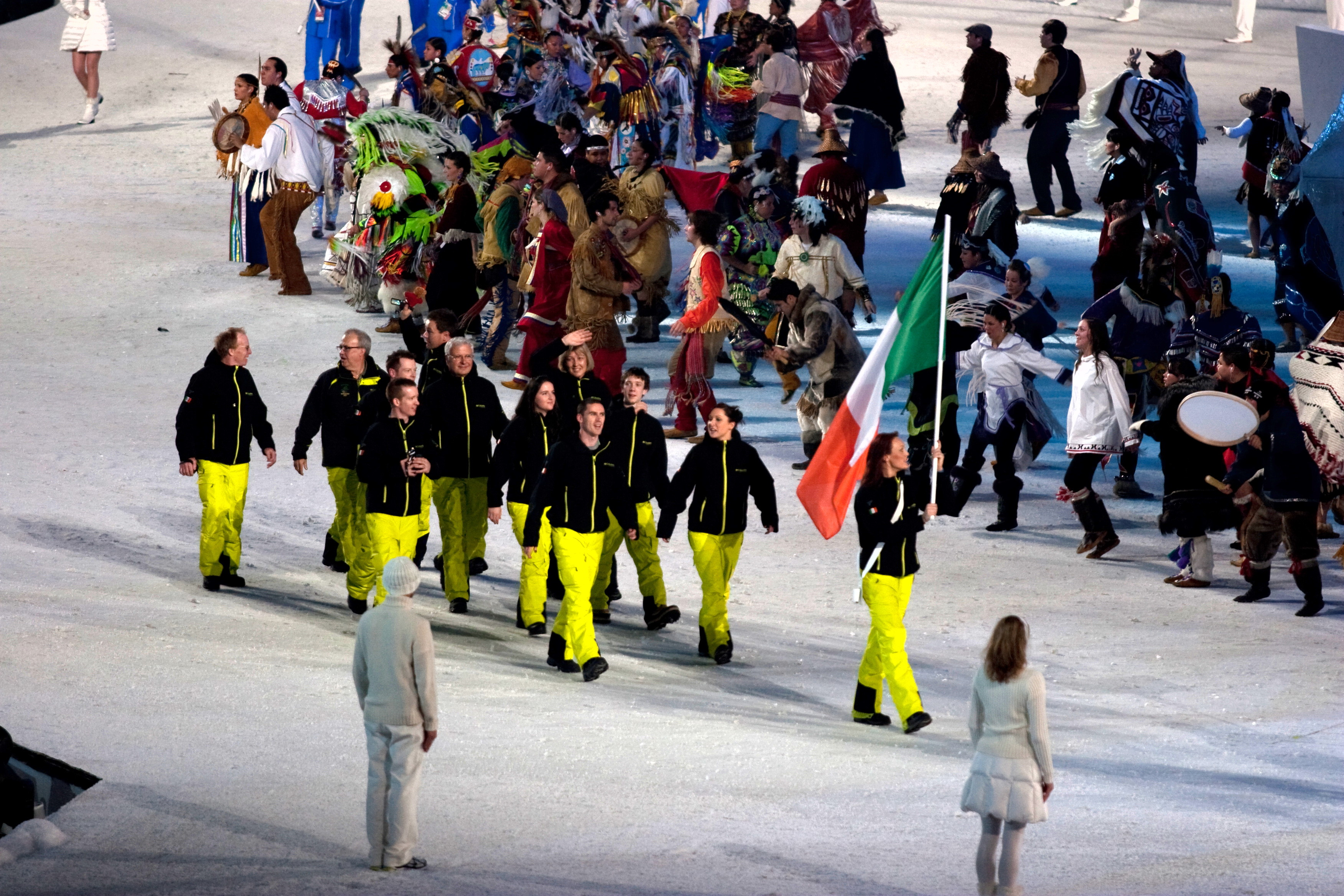
The athletes entering the stadium during the opening ceremonies.

== Alpine skiing ==
Athlete	Event	Final			
Athlete	Event	Run 1	Run 2	Total	Rank
Shane O'Connor	Men's slalom	1.00.83	1:04.31	2:05.14	45
Kirsty McGarry	Women's slalom	Disqualified			
Kirsty McGarry	Women's giant slalom	1:24.28	1:20.92	2:45.20	50

== Bob-sleigh ==
Athlete	Event	Final					
Athlete	Event	Run 1 1.00.83	Run 2	Run 3	Run 4	Total	Rank
Aoife Hoey; Claire Bergin	Two-woman	55.04	54.49	54.73	54.58	3:38.84	17

An alternate was also sent to Vancouver.

- Leona Byrne

== Cross-country skiing ==
Distance

Athlete	Event	Final	
Athlete	Event	Total	Rank
Peter-James Barron	Men's 15 km freestyle	43:50.4	91

== Skeleton ==
Athlete	Event	Final					
Athlete	Event	Run 1	Run 2	Run 3	Run 4	Total	Rank
Patrick Shannon	Men's	55.18	55.20	54.60	-	2:44.98	25
