= Aoife Hoey =

Irish bobsledder (born 1983)

Personal information
- Nationality: Irish
- Born: 6 September 1983 (age 42) Portarlington, County Laois, Ireland
- Years active: 2002–2010
- Height: 6 ft 4 in (193 cm) (2010)

Sport
- Country: (Republic of Ireland) Ireland
- Sport: Bobsleigh
- Former partner: Claire Bergin
- Retired: 2010

Achievements and titles
- Olympic finals: 2010 Winter Olympics
- Updated on 18 February 2015

Aoife Hoey (born 6 September 1983) is an Irish bobsledder who has competed since 2004. She finished 22nd out of 23 in the two-woman event at the 2005 FIBT World Championships in Calgary. At 6 ft 4 in (1.93 m), she was the tallest woman at the 2010 Winter Olympics.

== Bobsleigh career ==
Aoife and her older sister Siobhán, teamed up in the Winter of 2002 – Aoife as pilot and Siobhain on brake. They received partial funding from the Olympic Council of Ireland but no commercial sponsorship. Following the worst possible start to the 2005–2006 Winter season (Serious injury) they narrowly missed out on qualification for the 2006 Winter Olympics. Teaming up with new recruit Jennifer Corcoran, for the 2007–08 bobsleigh season, Hoey qualified to compete in the European Bobsleigh Cup. She competed in the first two events of the season, finishing fifth at Igls on 22 November 2007 and 14th at Königssee on 29 November 2007.

Following a difficult season 2009–2010 racing in European Cup and World Cup events with brake athlete Claire Bergin, Hoey qualified for the Winter Olympic Games in Vancouver, British Columbia, Canada. She was named flagbearer for the Irish team at the opening ceremony of those games.

The bobsleigh team of Aoife Hoey and Claire Bergin finished in 17th place at the 2010 Winter Olympics. At a routine MRI scan at the Olympic village, three days before the competition, Hoey was diagnosed with endometriosis as well as three herniated discs in her back. She competed anyway, but announced her retirement from competitive sport shortly afterwards, to prevent further and potentially permanent spinal damage.

== Athletics career ==
In 2005, she was Irish national outdoor champion in the triple jump. She also works for the Athletics Ireland in the High Performance unit.
