= Hunter Hess =

American freestyle skier (born 1998)

Personal information
- Born: October 1, 1998 (age 27) Bend, Oregon, U.S.

Sport
- Country: United States
- Sport: Freestyle skiing
- Event: Halfpipe
Medal record
Men's freestyle skiing
Representing the United States
Winter X Games
| Bronze medal – third place | 2024 Aspen | SuperPipe |
| Bronze medal – third place | 2025 Aspen | SuperPipe |

Hunter Hess (born October 1, 1998) is an American freestyle skier. He represented the United States at the 2026 Winter Olympics.

== Early life ==
Hess attended Summit High School in Bend, Oregon where he played soccer. He competed in the USASA Enter the Dragon competition at Mt. Bachelor and eventually joined the Mt. Bachelor Sports Education Foundation (MBSEF) at nine years old.

== Career ==
During the 2018–19 FIS Freestyle Ski World Cup, Hess earned his first FIS Freestyle Ski World Cup podium finish on December 22, 2018, finishing in third place.

A few months before the Olympic qualifiers, Hess crashed while training, tearing his medial collateral ligament (MCL), and failed to qualify for the 2022 Winter Olympics. He finished the 2023–24 FIS Freestyle Ski World Cup with three podium finishes, and in second place in the overall standings with 265 points, finishing behind teammate Alex Ferreira.

In January 2024, Hess competed at the Winter X Games in Aspen and won a bronze medal in the SuperPipe event with a score of 92 on his third and final run to edge three-time Olympic medalist Nick Goepper. In January 2025, he again competed at the Winter X Games in Aspen and won a bronze medal in the SuperPipe event with a score of 85.66.

Hess represented the United States at the 2025 FIS Freestyle Ski World Championships in the halfpipe event and finished in fifth place with a score of 89.75. During the 2025–26 FIS Freestyle Ski World Cup season opener on December 12, 2025, he finished in third place with a score of 86.25. The next week, on December 20, 2025, he finished in second place with a score of 89.00.

Hess qualified for his first Winter Olympics in 2026. At a press conference where U.S. Olympians were questioned how they felt about representing their country during a time of increased immigration enforcement policies in President Donald Trump's presidency, Hess stated that he had "mixed feelings", adding "There's obviously a lot going on that I'm not the biggest fan of, and I think a lot of people aren't. I think for me it's more I'm representing my, like, friends and family back home, the people that represented it before me, all the things that I believe are good about the U.S." The remarks triggered widespread backlash on social media and from several prominent conservative figures, including President Trump who called Hess a "real loser". Gold medalist Mike Eruzione suggested that if Hess "doesn't represent his country but his family and friends, then don't put on the USA uniform". Olympians including Eileen Gu and Chloe Kim defended Hess, with cross-country skier Zak Ketterson saying, "it's pretty childish to come at somebody for exercising their free speech." Hess went on to finish in 10th place in the halfpipe final.
