= Jeff Pamplin =

Irish bobsledder

Personal information
- Nationality: Irish
- Born: 4 November 1973 (age 51)

Sport
- Sport: Bobsleigh

Jeff Pamplin (born 4 November 1973) is an Irish bobsledder. He competed in the two man and the four man events at the 1998 Winter Olympics.
