= Pat O'Callaghan =

Irish hammer thrower (1906–1991)

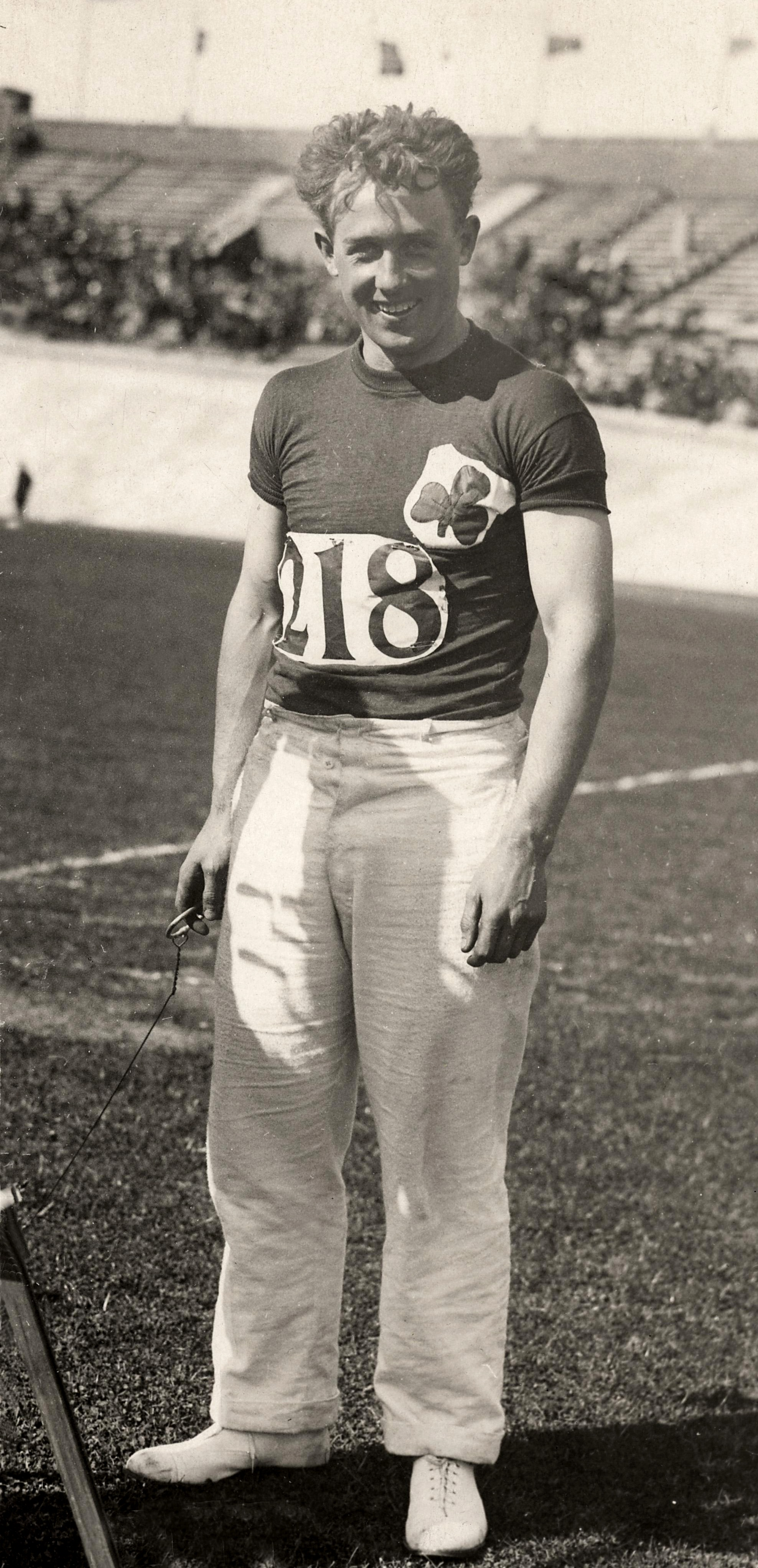
- O'Callaghan at the 1928 Olympic Games

Personal information
- Native name: Pádraig Ó Ceallacháin
- Nationality: Irish
- Born: Patrick O'Callaghan; 28 January 1906 Kanturk, County Cork, Ireland
- Died: 1 December 1991 (aged 85) Clonmel, County Tipperary, Ireland
- Education: Royal College of Surgeons
- Occupation: Doctor
- Height: 1.80 m (5 ft 11 in)
- Weight: 98 kg (216 lb)
- Spouse: Kitty O'Reilly (m. 1934)
- Children: 5

Sport
- Country: Ireland
- Sport: Athletics
- Event: Hammer throw
- Club: Kanturk AC

Achievements and titles
- Personal bests: 59.55m (Fermoy, 1937)
Medal record
Representing Ireland
Olympic Games
Gold medal – first place	1928 Amsterdam	Hammer throw
Gold medal – first place	1932 Los Angeles	Hammer throw
Tailteann Games
Gold medal – first place	1928 Dublin	Hammer throw

Patrick O'Callaghan (28 January 1906 – 1 December 1991) was an Irish hammer thrower and double Olympic gold medallist. He was the first athlete from Ireland to win an Olympic medal under the Irish flag rather than the British flag.

== Early and private life ==
O'Callaghan was born in the townland of Knockaneroe, near Kanturk, County Cork, on 28 January 1906, the second of three sons born to Paddy O'Callaghan, a farmer, and Jane (née Healy). He began his education at the age of two at Derrygalun national school. O'Callaghan progressed to secondary school in Kanturk and at the age of fifteen, he won a scholarship to the Patrician Academy in Mallow. During his year in the Patrician Academy, he cycled the 51-kilometre (32-mile) round trip from Derrygalun every day and he never missed a class. O'Callaghan subsequently studied medicine at the Royal College of Surgeons in Dublin. Following his graduation in 1926 as the youngest doctor ever produced by RCSI, he pursued postgraduate studies at University College Cork, then joined the Royal Air Force Medical Service and was stationed at RAF Halton. He returned to Ireland in 1928 and set up his own medical practice in Clonmel, County Tipperary, where he worked until his retirement in 1984. O'Callaghan was also a renowned field sports practitioner, greyhound trainer and storyteller. In 1934, he married Kitty O'Reilly, a native of Clonmel, with whom he had four sons followed by a daughter. One of O'Callaghan's sons, Hugh, won twelve Irish national athletics titles (four shot put, four discus, two hammer, one javelin and one decathlon) and three Irish weightlifting titles, setting eight Irish shot put records and three Irish weightlifting records; he was also a successful weightlifting coach in the United States.

== Sporting career ==
=== Early sporting life ===
O’Callaghan was born into a family that had a huge interest in a variety of different sports. His uncle, Tim Vaughan, was a national sprint champion and played Gaelic football with Cork in 1893. O’Callaghan's eldest brother, Seán, also enjoyed football as well as winning a national 440 yards hurdles title, while his other brother, Con, was also regarded as a gifted runner, jumper and thrower. O’Callaghan's early sporting passions included fishing, poaching and Gaelic football. He was regarded as an excellent midfielder on the Banteer football team, while he also lined out with the Banteer hurling team.

At university in Dublin, O’Callaghan broadened his sporting experiences by joining the local senior rugby club. This was at a time when the Gaelic Athletic Association forbade players of Gaelic games from playing "foreign sports". It was also in Dublin that O’Callaghan first developed an interest in hammer throwing. In 1926, he returned to his native Duhallow where he set up a training regime in that discipline. Here he fashioned his own hammer by boring a one-inch hole through a 16 lb shot and filling it with the ball-bearing core of a bicycle pedal. He also set up a throwing circle in a nearby field where he trained. In 1927, O’Callaghan returned to Dublin where he won that year's hammer championship with a throw of 43.36 m (142 ft 3 in). In 1928, he retained his national title with a throw of 49.53 m (162 ft 6 in), a win that allowed him to represent Ireland at the 1928 Summer Olympics. On the same day, O’Callaghan's brother, Con, won the shot put and the decathlon and also qualified for the Olympic Games. Between winning his national title and competing in the Olympic Games O’Callaghan improved his throwing distance by recording a distance of 50.88 m (166 ft 11 in) at the Royal Ulster Constabulary Sports in Belfast.

=== 1928 Olympic Games ===
In the summer of 1928, the three O’Callaghan brothers paid their own fares when travelling to the Olympic Games in Amsterdam. Pat finished in sixth place in the preliminary round and started the final with a throw of 47.49 m (155 ft 10 in). This put him in third place behind Ossian Skiöld of Sweden but ahead of Malcolm Nokes, the favourite from Great Britain. For his second throw, O’Callaghan used the Swede's own hammer and recorded a throw of 51.39 m (168 ft 7 in). This was 10 cm (4 in) more than Skiöld's throw and resulted in a first gold medal for O’Callaghan and for Ireland. The podium presentation was particularly emotional as it was the first time at an Olympic Games that the Irish tricolour was raised and Amhrán na bhFiann was played.

=== Success in Ireland ===
After returning from the Olympic Games, O’Callaghan cemented his reputation as a great athlete with additional successes between 1929 and 1932. In the national championships of 1930 he won the hammer, shot-putt, 56 lbs without follow, 56 lbs over-the-bar, discus and high jump.

In the summer of 1930, O’Callaghan took part in a two-day invitation event in Stockholm where Oissian Skoeld was expected to gain revenge on the Irishman for the defeat in Amsterdam. On the first day of the competition, Skoeld broke his own European record with his very first throw. O’Callaghan followed immediately and overtook him with his own first throw breaking the new record. On the second day of the event both O’Callaghan and Skoeld were neck-and-neck, when the former, with his last throw, set a new European record of 54.46 m (178 ft 8 in) to win.

=== 1932 Summer Olympics ===
By the time the 1932 Summer Olympics came around, O’Callaghan was regularly throwing the hammer over 52 metres (170 ft). The Irish team were much better organised on that occasion and the whole journey to Los Angeles was funded by a church-gate collection. Shortly before departing on the 9,700-kilometre (6,000 mi) boat and train journey across the Atlantic, O’Callaghan collected a fifth hammer title at the national championships.

On arrival in Los Angeles, O’Callaghan's preparations of the defence of his title came unstuck. The surface of the hammer circle had always been of grass or clay and throwers wore field shoes with steel spikes set into the heel and sole for grip. In Los Angeles, however, a cinder surface was to be provided. The Olympic Committee of Ireland had failed to notify O’Callaghan of this change. Consequently, he came to the arena with three pairs of spiked shoes for a grass or clay surface and time did not permit a change of shoe. He wore his shortest spikes, but found that they caught in the hard gritty slab and impeded his crucial third turn. Despite being severely impeded, he managed to qualify for the final stage of the competition with his second throw of 52.21 m (171 ft 4 in). While the final of the 400m hurdles was delayed, O’Callaghan hunted down a hacksaw and a file in the groundskeeper's shack and cut off the spikes. O’Callaghan's second throw reached a distance of 53.92 m (176 ft 11 in), a score that allowed him to retain his Olympic title. It was Ireland's second gold medal of the day as Bob Tisdall had earlier won a gold medal in the 400m hurdles.

=== Retirement ===
O’Callaghan did not take part in the national athletic championships in Ireland in 1933. However, he still worked hard at training and experimented with a fourth turn to set a new European record at 54.48 m (178 ft 9 in). By this stage, O’Callaghan was rated as the top thrower in the world by the leading international sports journalists. In the early 1930s, a controversy erupted between the British AAA and the National Athletic and Cycling Association of Ireland (NACAI). The British AAA claimed jurisdiction in Northern Ireland while the NACAI claimed jurisdiction over the entire island of Ireland regardless of political division. The controversy came to a head in the lead-up to the 1936 Summer Olympics when the IAAF finally disqualified the NACAI.

O'Callaghan won the British AAA Championships title in the hammer throw event at the British 1934 AAA Championships.

O’Callaghan remained loyal to the NACAI, a decision which effectively brought an end to his international athletic career. No Irish team travelled to the 1936 Olympic Games; however, O’Callaghan travelled to Berlin as a private spectator. After Berlin, O’Callaghan's international career was over. He declined to join the new Irish Amateur Athletics Union (IAAU) or subsequent IOC-recognised Amateur Athletics Union of Eire (AAUE) and continued to compete under NACAI rules. At Fermoy in 1937 he threw 59.54 m (195 ft 4 in) – nearly two metres ahead of the world record of 57.77 m (189 ft 6 in) set by his old friend Paddy 'Chicken' Ryan in 1913. This record, however, was not ratified by the AAUE or the IAAF. In retirement, O’Callaghan remained interested in athletics. He travelled to every Olympic Games up until 1988 and enjoyed fishing and shooting pheasants in Clonmel. He died on 1 December 1991.

== Legacy ==
O'Callaghan was the flag bearer for Ireland at the 1932 Olympics. In 1960, he became the first person to receive the Texaco Hall of Fame Award. He was made a Freeman of Clonmel in 1984 and was honorary president of Commercials GAA. In 1988 he was awarded the inaugural Distinguished Graduate Award by the RCSI Association of Medical and Dental Graduates. The Dr Pat O'Callaghan Sports Complex at Cashel Rd, Clonmel, which is the home of Clonmel Town Football Club, is named after him. In January 2007, a statue to him was raised in Banteer, County Cork.

New award	Texaco Hall of Fame Award; 1960	Succeeded by Mick Mackey
