= Ireland at the 2014 Winter Olympics =

- IOC code: IRL
- NOC: Olympic Federation of Ireland
- Website: olympics.ie

in Sochi
- Competitors: 5 in 4 sports
- Flag bearers: Conor Lyne (opening); Seamus O'Connor (closing)
- Medals: Gold 0 Silver 0 Bronze 0 Total 0

Winter Olympics appearances (overview)
- 1992; 1994; 1998; 2002; 2006; 2010; 2014; 2018; 2022; 2026

Ireland competed at the 2014 Winter Olympics in Sochi, Russia from 7 to 23 February 2014. Five competitors in four sports made up the Ireland team. All five members of the team are members of the Irish diaspora, who were born or live and train elsewhere.

== Alpine skiing ==
According to the final quota allocation released on 20 January 2014, Ireland had two athletes in qualification positions.

Athlete	Event	Run 1		Run 2		Total	
Athlete	Event	Time	Rank	Time	Rank	Time	Rank
Conor Lyne	Men's giant slalom	DNF					
Conor Lyne	Men's slalom	1:03.58	74	1:09.71	40	2:13.29	42
Florence Bell	Women's giant slalom	DNF					
Florence Bell	Women's slalom	1:07.84	55	DNF			

== Cross-country skiing ==
According to the quota allocation released on 20 January 2014, Ireland had one athlete in a qualifying position.

Athlete	Event	Final		
Athlete	Event	Time	Deficit	Rank
Jan Rossiter	Men's 15 km classical	48:44.6	+10:14.9	82

== Skeleton ==
Ireland has qualified one athlete for the men's single event. Sean Greenwood originally competed for Canada but switched to compete for Ireland to pay homage to his heritage.

Athlete	Event	Run 1		Run 2		Run 3		Run 4		Total	
Athlete	Event	Time	Rank	Time	Rank	Time	Rank	Time	Rank	Time	Rank
Sean Greenwood	Men's	57.99	21	1:05.11	27	58.22	=23	Did not advance		3:01.32	27

== Snowboarding ==
According to the quota allocation released on 20 January 2014, Ireland had one athlete qualified in two events.

Athlete	Event	Qualification				Semifinal				Final			
Athlete	Event	Run 1	Run 2	Best	Rank	Run 1	Run 2	Best	Rank	Run 1	Run 2	Best	Rank
Seamus O'Connor	Men's halfpipe	66.25	71.50	71.50	8 QS	54.00	43.00	54.00	9	Did not advance			
Seamus O'Connor	Men's slopestyle	33.50	40.00	40.00	13 QS	60.75	70.25	70.25	9	Did not advance			

Qualification Legend: QF – Qualify directly to final; QS – Qualify to semifinal

== See also ==
- Ireland at the 2014 Summer Youth Olympics
