= FIS Freestyle Ski and Snowboarding World Championships 2025 – Men's ski halfpipe =

Men's ski halfpipe at the FIS Freestyle Ski and Snowboarding World Championships 2025
- Location: Corvatsch, Switzerland
- Date: 28 March (qualification); 30 March (final)
- Competitors: 22 from 9 nations
- Winning points: 96.00

Medalists
gold medal	Finley Melville Ives	New Zealand
silver medal	Nick Goepper	United States
bronze medal	Alex Ferreira	United States

The Men's ski halfpipe competition at the FIS Freestyle Ski and Snowboarding World Championships 2025 was held on 28 and 30 March 2025.

== Qualification ==
The qualification was started on 28 March at 12:15. The best sixteen skiers qualified for the final.

Rank	Bib	Name	Country	Run 1	Run 2	Best	Notes
1	5	Finley Melville Ives	New Zealand	94.75	97.00	97.00	Q
2	7	Luke Harrold	New Zealand	90.00	DNI	90.00	Q
3	1	Alex Ferreira	United States	88.00	DNI	88.00	Q
4	11	Henry Sildaru	Estonia	80.75	86.25	86.25	Q
5	6	David Wise	United States	85.00	DNI	85.00	Q
6	2	Nick Goepper	United States	82.50	DNI	82.50	Q
7	4	Hunter Hess	United States	81.75	DNI	81.75	Q
8	3	Brendan Mackay	Canada	7.00	79.75	79.75	Q
9	10	Dylan Marineau	Canada	79.00	DNI	79.00	Q
10	8	Andrew Longino	Canada	75.00	77.00	77.00	Q
11	15	Quincy Barr	Canada	68.25	71.50	71.50	Q
12	14	Noah Bowman	Canada	67.00	DNI	67.00	Q
13	13	Toma Matsuura	Japan	61.75	66.50	66.50	Q
14	16	Rafael Kreienbühl	Switzerland	64.25	66.25	66.25	Q
15	17	Sheng Haipeng	China	59.75	DNI	59.75	Q
16	19	Samuel Baumgartner	Austria	3.50	59.00	59.00	Q
17	22	Su Shuaibing	China	57.75	DNI	57.75	
18	18	Sun Jingbo	China	53.50	57.00	57.00	
19	23	Cooper Breen	New Zealand	56.25	DNI	56.25	
20	24	Yang Kaile	China	55.25	DNI	55.25	
21	21	Moon Hee-sung	South Korea	48.75	DNI	48.75	
22	20	Alan Bornet	Switzerland	6.50	11.50	11.50	
	12	Liam Richards	Great Britain	Did not start			

== Final ==
The final was started on 30 March at 13:00.

Rank	Bib	Start order	Name	Country	Run 1	Run 2	Best
1st place, gold medalist(s)	5	16	Finley Melville Ives	New Zealand	96.00	DNI	96.00
2nd place, silver medalist(s)	2	11	Nick Goepper	United States	24.75	94.00	94.00
3rd place, bronze medalist(s)	1	14	Alex Ferreira	United States	92.50	DNI	92.50
4	7	15	Luke Harrold	New Zealand	90.75	42.00	90.75
5	4	10	Hunter Hess	United States	18.50	89.75	89.75
6	11	13	Henry Sildaru	Estonia	88.75	DNI	88.75
7	3	9	Brendan Mackay	Canada	86.25	DNI	86.25
8	10	8	Dylan Marineau	Canada	84.50	DNI	84.50
9	8	7	Andrew Longino	Canada	81.00	DNI	81.00
10	14	5	Noah Bowman	Canada	75.00	DNI	75.00
11	6	12	David Wise	United States	15.25	74.25	74.25
12	15	6	Quincy Barr	Canada	73.25	DNI	73.25
13	16	3	Rafael Kreienbühl	Switzerland	70.00	DNI	70.00
14	13	4	Toma Matsuura	Japan	9.25	66.50	66.50
15	19	1	Samuel Baumgartner	Austria	59.50	DNI	59.50
16	17	2	Sheng Haipeng	China	4.75	11.00	11.00
