= Malachy Sheridan =

Irish bobsledder

Personal information
- Nationality: Irish
- Born: 13 February 1966
- Died: December 2002

Sport
- Sport: Bobsleigh

Malachy Sheridan (13 February 1966 – December 2002) was an Irish bobsledder. He competed in the two man event at the 1992 Winter Olympics. Prior to competing at the Olympics, Sheridan was a pole vaulter and decathlete, and was the British AAA champion in the decathlon in 1985.
