= Henry Sildaru =

Estonian freestyle skier (born 2006)

Personal information
- Born: 26 August 2006 (age 19) Tallinn, Estonia

Sport
- Country: Estonia
- Sport: Freestyle skiing
Medal record
Men's freestyle skiing
Representing Estonia
Olympic Games
Silver medal – second place	2026 Milano Cortina	Halfpipe
Junior World Championships
Gold medal – first place	2021 Krasnoyarsk	Halfpipe
Bronze medal – third place	2021 Krasnoyarsk	Slopestyle
Bronze medal – third place	2024 Livigno/Mottolino	Slopestyle

Henry Sildaru (born 26 August 2006) is an Estonian freestyle skier. He represented Estonia at the 2026 Winter Olympics and won a silver medal in the halfpipe event.

== Career ==
Sildaru made his FIS Freestyle Junior World Ski Championships in 2021 and won a gold medal in the halfpipe, and a bronze medal in the slopestyle events. He again competed at the Junior World Championships in 2024 and won a bronze medal in the slopestyle event.

He made his FIS Freestyle World Ski Championships in 2025, and competed in slopestyle, big air and halfpipe disciplines.

During the 2025–26 FIS Freestyle Ski World Cup, Sildaru earned his first career World Cup podium in slopestyle on 9 January 2026, finishing in second place. He was then selected to represent Estonia at the 2026 Winter Olympics in three freestyle skiing events. He won a silver medal in the halfpipe event with a score of 93.00, finishing .75 points behind gold medalist Alex Ferreira.

== Personal life ==
Sildaru is the younger brother of Olympic freestyle skier Kelly Sildaru.
