= Gerry Macken =

Irish bobsledder

Personal information
- Nationality: Irish
- Born: 5 October 1957 (age 67)

Sport
- Sport: Bobsleigh

Gerry Macken (born 5 October 1957) is an Irish bobsledder. He competed in the two man event at the 1992 Winter Olympics. Macken's story was the subject of a documentary film, Breaking Ice, which was shown at the 2020 Galway Film Fleadh.
