= Con O'Callaghan (hurler) =

Irish hurler

Con "Callan" O'Callaghan
Personal information
- Nickname: Callan
- Born: Cork, Ireland

Sport
- Sport: Hurling
- Position: Forward
Club
- Years: Club
- 1880s-1890s: Redmonds
Club titles
- Cork titles: 1
Inter-county
Years	County	Apps (scores)
1892	Cork	2
Inter-county titles
- Munster titles: 1
- All-Irelands: 1

Con "Callan" O'Callaghan was an Irish sportsperson. He played hurling with his local club Redmonds and was a member of the Cork senior inter-county team for one season in 1892.

== Playing career ==
=== Club ===
O'Callaghan played his club hurling with the famous Redmonds club and enjoyed some success.

=== Inter-county ===
O'Callaghan first came to prominence on the inter-county scene with Cork as part of the Redmond's selection in 1892. That year he lined out in his first provincial decider with All-Ireland champions Kerry providing the opposition. An exciting game developed, however, at full-time Cork were the champions by 5-3 to 2-5. It was O'Callaghan's first, and only, Munster title. Cork's next game was an All-Ireland final meeting with Dublin. The game was a controversial one as referee Dan Fraher changed his mind after initially awarding a goal to Cork. He eventually decided that the GAA's Central Council should decide the matter. Dublin, however, had walked off the field and, because of this, Cork were awarded the title. It gave O'Callaghan an All-Ireland title.

== Sources ==
- Corry, Eoghan, The GAA Book of Lists (Hodder Headline Ireland, 2005).
- Cronin, Jim, A Rebel Hundred: Cork's 100 All-Ireland Titles.
- Donegan, Des, The Complete Handbook of Gaelic Games (DBA Publications Limited, 2005).
