= Kirsten McGarry =

Irish alpine skier (born 1985)

- Born: 25 July 1985 (age 40); Dalkey, Ireland
- Occupation: alpine skier

Kristen McGarry (born 25 July 1985 in Dalkey, Ireland) is an alpine skier from Ireland. She competed for Ireland at the 2006 Winter Olympics and the 2010 Winter Olympics. Her best result was a 32nd place in the giant slalom in 2006.

== Biography ==
=== Childhood and youth ===
Kirsty McGarry hails from the coastal town of Dalkey, a suburb of Dublin. She discovered her love of skiing during stays in Châtel, France, her parents' winter home. After surviving meningitis at the age of nine, she competed in her first races, supported by her ski instructor parents. In 2000, she won the prestigious Ski d'Or race in the slalom.

At the age of 15, she completed her first FIS races in Thredbo, Australia. In February 2001, she took part in a Junior World Championships for the first time in Verbier, finishing 49th in the giant slalom as her best result. She was not able to top this result in two further JWM participations. Her first triumph came in April 2001, when she won the slalom at Aonach Mòr ahead of her sister Tamsen at the British Championships. McGarry's greatest international successes came in the Australian New Zealand Cup, where she racked up four wins and nine other podium finishes between 2002 and 2007. In 2005, she won the overall classification.
