= Michelle Smith =

Irish swimmer

Personal information
- Full name: Michelle Smith de Bruin
- Born: 16 December 1969 (age 56) Rathcoole, County Dublin, Ireland

Sport
- Sport: Swimming
- Strokes: Freestyle, butterfly, Individual medley
- College team: Houston Cougars
- Coach: Erik de Bruin
Medal record
Women's swimming
Representing Ireland
Event	1st	2nd	3rd
Olympic Games	3	0	1
European Championships (LC)	4	3	0
Total	7	3	1
Olympic Games
Gold medal – first place	1996 Atlanta	400 m freestyle
Gold medal – first place	1996 Atlanta	200 m individual medley
Gold medal – first place	1996 Atlanta	400 m individual medley
Bronze medal – third place	1996 Atlanta	200 m butterfly
European Championships (LC)
Gold medal – first place	1995 Vienna	200 m butterfly
Gold medal – first place	1995 Vienna	200 m individual medley
Gold medal – first place	1997 Seville	200 m freestyle
Gold medal – first place	1997 Seville	400 m individual medley
Silver medal – second place	1995 Vienna	400 m individual medley
Silver medal – second place	1997 Seville	400 m freestyle
Silver medal – second place	1997 Seville	200 m butterfly

Michelle Smith de Bruin (born 16 December 1969) is an Irish lawyer and retired Olympic swimmer. She won three gold medals at the 1996 Summer Olympics in Atlanta, for the 400 m individual medley, 400 m freestyle and 200 m individual medley, and also won the bronze medal for the 200 m butterfly event.

Smith's rise to dominance in the 1995 European Championships, followed by her wins in Atlanta, all at a relatively advanced age for swimmers, were marked by allegations of doping that were never proven. Smith was later banned for four years by FINA, the international swimming federation, for manipulation of an anti-doping sample by deliberate contamination with alcohol, a decision upheld by the Court of Arbitration for Sport when Smith appealed. Already superannuated in swimming terms, Smith never returned to competitive swimming and later worked as a barrister, practising under her married name of Michelle Smith de Bruin.

Despite the ban for manipulating samples, authorities were unable to prove that Smith's swimming achievements were the result of using performance enhancers and, therefore, not annulled, so she remains Ireland's most successful Olympian.

== Swimming career ==
Michelle Smith's father taught his daughters how to swim, and Smith was first spotted by a lifeguard in Tallaght swimming pool at age nine. He suggested that Smith's father enroll his daughter in a swimming club. Smith joined Terenure Swimming Club and trained under the tutelage of Larry Williamson. Smith won the Dublin and All-Ireland Community Games at aged 9. She won ten gold medals at a novice competition. She enrolled in the King's Hospital Swimming Club in 1980. At aged 14, Smith won ten medals at the Irish National Swimming Championships. At 14, she became National Junior and Senior Champion and dominated Irish women's swimming until her retirement in 1998. She later swam collegiately at the University of Houston.

Smith first appeared on the world scene as an 18-year-old at the Seoul Olympics and narrowly missed the B-final in the 200 m backstroke (top 16). Smith's second major championship was at the 1991 World Championships in Perth, Australia, where she finished 13th in the 400 m individual medley. She competed at the 1991 European Championships and qualified for the 1992 Olympic Games. She competed in the 200 m medley and backstroke and 400 m medley in the 1992 Olympics in Barcelona, Spain, despite suffering an injury in the months leading up to the Games. She finished fifth in the 200 m butterfly at the 1994 World Championships. In that same year, she suffered from glandular fever, which affected her training prior to the World Championships.

=== FINA Swimming World Cup results ===
Smith competed in the 1994 and 1995 FINA Swimming World Cup series. In the 1994 series, she won two gold medals and a bronze medal and in the 1995 Swimming World Cup Series, she won seven gold, one silver and two bronze medals, for a total of 13 medals overall.

Date	Venue	Event	Result	Recorded time
22 March 1994	Sheffield, England	200 m backstroke	3rd place, bronze medalist(s)	2:10.76
27 March 1994	Paris, France	400 m individual medley	1st place, gold medalist(s)	4:36.84
1 January 1995	Hong Kong	100 m butterfly	1st place, gold medalist(s)	59.99
1 January 1995	Hong Kong	200 m individual medley	1st place, gold medalist(s)	2:13.46
2 January 1995	Hong Kong	200 m butterfly	1st place, gold medalist(s)	2:08.55*
2 January 1995	Hong Kong	100 m individual medley	2nd place, silver medalist(s)	1:02.70
5 February 1995	Paris	200 m butterfly	1st place, gold medalist(s)	2:09.65*
7 February 1995	St Vincent, Italy	100 m butterfly	1st place, gold medalist(s)	1:00.77*
7 February 1995	St Vincent, Italy	200 m individual medley	3rd place, bronze medalist(s)	2:17.33*
8 February 1995	St Vincent, Italy	200 m butterfly	1st place, gold medalist(s)	Time not located
11 February 1995	Sheffield	100 m butterfly	3rd place, bronze medalist(s)	1:00.61*
12 February 1995	Sheffield	200 m butterfly	1st place, gold medalist(s)	2:10.87*
Source: World Aquatics athlete results database.

=== 1995 season ===
In 1995, Smith won the short-course Swimming World Cup series and setting Irish records in nine events: the 50-metre, 100-metre, 400-metre and 800-metre freestyle; 100-metre backstroke; 100-metre and 200-metre butterfly; and 200-metre and 400-metre individual medley.

At the 1995 European Aquatics Championships in Vienna, she became the first Irish swimmer to win a European swimming title. She won gold medals in the 200-metre individual medley and 200-metre butterfly and a silver medal in the 400-metre individual medley. She recorded times of 2:15.27 in the 200-metre individual medley, 2:11.60 in the 200-metre butterfly and 4:42.82 in the 400-metre individual medley.

In 1995, Smith set Irish records in 50 m, 100 m, 400 m and 800 m freestyle, 100 m backstroke, 100 m and 200 m butterfly and 200 m and 400 m medley events.

She was ranked number 1 in 200 m butterfly, sixth in 100 m butterfly and seventh in 200 m medley; she made sporting history by becoming the first Irishwoman to win a European title in 200 m butterfly and the individual 400 m medley in the same year.

=== 1996 Olympics ===
Smith won three gold medals and a bronze medal in Atlanta. There was controversy at the Games due to Smith qualifying for the 400m freestyle event at the expense of the then-world record holder Janet Evans, who had finished ninth in the preliminary swims with only the top eight advancing. Smith did not submit her qualifying time for the 400m freestyle event before the 5 July deadline but did so two days later with the Irish Olympic officials insisting they had been given permission to submit the qualifying time after the deadline. Smith applied for the event after she had arrived in Atlanta. After Smith qualified at the expense of Evans, the US Swimming Federation, supported by the German and Netherlands swimming teams, challenged a decision to allow Smith to compete but were unsuccessful. At a later conference, Evans highlighted that accusations of Smith doping had been heard by her poolside. Smith later received an apology from Evans

Smith de Bruin was chosen as the RTÉ Sports Person of the Year in 1996 and was also named European Female Swimmer of the Year for 1996.

=== 1997 European Aquatics Championships ===
At the 1997 European Aquatics Championships in Seville, Smith de Bruin won gold medals in the 200-metre freestyle and 400-metre individual medley, together with silver medals in the 400-metre freestyle and 200-metre butterfly. Her four medals constituted Ireland's entire medal haul at the championships.

De Bruin’s 200 m freestyle victory was particularly close. She defeated Russia’s Nadezhda Chemezova by four hundredths of a second, setting an Irish record of 1:59.93. In the 400 m freestyle, she finished second behind Germany’s Dagmar Hase. In the concluding 200 m butterfly, Smith de Bruin led through the first 150 metres but was overtaken by Spain’s María Peláez during the final metres of the race.

As of 2026, her four medals remain the most won by an Irish swimmer at a single edition of the European Aquatics Championships.

== Sample tampering ban ==
In April 1998, an exclusive by Craig Lord in The Times newspaper broke the news that Smith faced an anti-doping challenge. Two years after the 1996 Summer Olympics, FINA banned Smith for four years for tampering with her urine sample using alcohol. She appealed the decision to the Court of Arbitration for Sport (CAS). Her case was heard by a panel of three sport lawyers, including Michael Beloff QC. Unusually for a CAS hearing, Smith's case was heard in public at her own lawyer's request. FINA submitted evidence from Jordi Segura, head of the IOC-accredited laboratory in Barcelona, that Smith took androstenedione, a metabolic precursor of testosterone, in the previous 10-to-12 hours before being tested. Smith denied this and androstenedione was not a banned substance. The International Olympic Committee banned androstenedione and placed it under the category of androgenic-anabolic steroids in 1997. The CAS upheld the ban.

She was 28 at the time and the ban effectively ended her competitive swimming career. Smith was not stripped of her Olympic medals as she had never tested positive for any banned substances.

Her coach and husband, Erik De Bruin, previously served a four-year ban for using illegal drugs during his career as a discus thrower, and her late rise to dominance in the pool largely coincided with the beginning of her coaching relationship with him, despite his lack of history in coaching swimmers. Smith has always maintained her denial around using illegal performance-enhancing drugs, and has withdrawn from events where the issue might be raised publicly.

== Legal career ==
After retiring from swimming in 1999 Smith de Bruin returned to university, graduating from University College Dublin with a Bachelor of Civil Law degree. She was called to the Bar of Ireland in July 2005, having completed the Barrister-at-Law degree at King’s Inns (Dublin), where she won the Brian Walsh Moot Court Competition and graduated with honours. She has since undertaken further study in bioethics at Harvard University and, is currently a PhD candidate at the European Centre on Privacy and Cybersecurity (ECPC) at Maastricht University.

Smith practises as a barrister with a focus on civil litigation, EU and private international law. She has an interest in healthcare law and data/technology. She appears at all levels of the Irish courts and has had cases reported in the Irish Reports annually since 2007. Her practice spans commercial and financial disputes, personal injuries and clinical negligence (including complex, high‑value claims), family law (divorce, ancillary relief and international asset cases), judicial review and regulatory matters, and selected criminal work. She is a member of the Media, Internet and Data Protection Bar Association and has acted in notable cases involving defamation, data protection and early prosecutions under the Harassment, Harmful Communications and Related Offences Act 2020.

Since 2022 she has served as an arbitrator and Trade & Sustainable Development expert nominated by Ireland to the European Commission for state‑to‑state dispute settlement under EU bilateral trade agreements, and in the same year was appointed to the State Claims Agency’s clinical indemnity panel. She has published on transnational litigation, EU law and superior‑court practice, data sharing/technology law and contributes to standard Irish legal texts in these areas.

== Other activities ==
In 1996, she released her autobiography, Gold, co-written with Cathal Dervan.

In 2007, Smith appeared on Celebrities Go Wild, an RTÉ reality television show in which eight celebrities had to fend for themselves in the wilds of rural Connemara.

== Personal life ==
In 1993 Smith began training with Dutch discus thrower Erik de Bruin, whom she had met in Barcelona. They married in 1996. Smith lives in Kells, County Kilkenny with de Bruin and their two children.

== Legacy ==
While Smith technically remains Ireland's most successful Olympian, male or female and also still technically holds Irish records for 400 LCM freestyle and 200 SCM butterfly, the legitimacy of her achievements is strongly debated in Irish sporting circles.

In 2005, Smith de Bruin placed third in an RTÉ radio phone-in to choose Ireland's greatest woman. She received 19.8% of the vote, behind Nano Nagle and Mary Robinson. That was not specifically an "Olympic athlete" poll, but it did treat her as a major national figure largely because of her Olympic success.

In a public poll run by the national broadcaster prior to the 2024 Summer Olympics to find Ireland's Greatest Olympian, de Bruin collected only 7% of the vote despite being the clear leader in medals won - the award, with over 30% of the vote, going to rower Paul O'Donovan, followed by Katie Taylor and Sonia O'Sullivan.

In later commentary, some figures (such as the Olympic athlete and Senator Eamon Coghlan) have explicitly called her Ireland's "greatest Olympian" based on her medal record, while acknowledging that the view is divisive. Modern lists of Ireland's greatest Olympians routinely place her at or near the top for medal count, even while noting the doping-related controversy.

== See also ==
- List of multiple Olympic gold medalists at a single Games
- List of sportspeople sanctioned for doping offences

Awards and achievements
Preceded by Krisztina Egerszegi	European Swimmer of the Year; 1996	Succeeded by Ágnes Kovács
Olympic Games
Preceded by Wayne McCullough	Flagbearer for Ireland; Barcelona 1992	Succeeded by Francie Barrett
