= Cornelius O'Callaghan =

Cornelius O'Callaghan may refer to:

- Cornelius O'Callaghan (died 1742), Irish politician, MP for Fethard (Tipperary) 1723–1714
- Cornelius O'Callaghan (1712–1781), Irish politician, MP for Fethard (Tipperary) 1761–1768, for Newtownards
- Cornelius O'Callaghan, 1st Baron Lismore (1741–1797), Irish politician and peer, MP for Fethard, Tipperary 1768–1785
- Cornelius O'Callaghan, 1st Viscount Lismore (1775–1857), Irish peer and privy counsellor, MP for Lostwithiel 1806–1807
- Cornelius O'Callaghan (1809–1849), Irish politician, MP for Tipperary 1832–1835
- Cornelius O'Callaghan (Fianna Fáil politician) (1922–1974), Fianna Fáil senator 1970–1974
