= Con O'Callaghan (decathlete) =

Irish decathlete

Personal information
- Born: Cornelius O'Callaghan; 23 March 1908 Kanturk, Cork, Ireland
- Died: 22 May 1976 (aged 68) Bantry, Cork, Ireland

Sport
- Sport: Decathlon

Cornelius "Con" O'Callaghan (23 March 1908 – 22 May 1976) was an Irish track and field athlete. In 1928, he became the first Irish Olympian to compete in decathlon.

O'Callaghan was the middle of three sons of Paddy O'Callaghan and Jane Healy. His eldest brother Seán played football and won a national title in the 440 yards hurdles, whereas his other brother Pat was the Olympic champion in hammer throw in 1928 and 1932.
