= Tamsen McGarry =

Irish alpine skier (born 1982)

Personal information
- Nationality: Irish
- Born: 11 February 1982 (age 43); Bolton, England

Sport
- Sport: Alpine skiing

Tamsen McGarry (born 11 February 1982) is an Irish alpine skier. She competed in two events at the 2002 Winter Olympics. She was the first winter Olympian for Ireland.
