= Rory Morrish =

Irish cross-country skier (born 1968)

Rory Michael Morrish (born 8 January 1968) is an Irish cross-country skier who participated in the 2006 Winter Olympics, as well as multiple world championships. Morrish previously competed in orienteering, becoming a cross-country skier via the discipline of ski-orienteering. In March 2001 Morrish became the first ever Irish competitor to take part in ski-orienteering when he participated in the long and short races at the Rovaniemi round of the World Cup, finishing 32nd in both. At the 2005 World Ski Orienteering Championships, Morrish finished 53rd in the long-distance competition, 59th in the middle-distance race and 55th in the sprint. Morrish was selected as the flag bearer for the Irish team in the 2006 Winter Olympics closing ceremony. During the 2011 World Championships, Morrish received attention for racing with wooden skis.
