= Paul Kiernan (bobsleigh) =

Irish bobsledder

Personal information
- Nationality: Irish
- Born: 25 March 1974 (age 51); Dublin, Ireland

Sport
- Sport: Bobsleigh

Paul Kiernan (born 25 March 1974) is an Irish bobsledder. He competed in the two man event at the 2002 Winter Olympics.
