= Pat McDonagh (sportsman) =

Irish rower and bobsledder

Personal information
- Nationality: Irish
- Born: 5 May 1957 (age 68)

Sport
- Sport: Bobsleigh; Rowing

Pat McDonagh (born 5 May 1957) is an Irish sportsman. He competed in rowing at the 1980 Summer Olympics and the 1988 Summer Olympics. He also competed in the bobsleigh at the 1992 Winter Olympics.
