= Thomas Maloney Westgård =

Norwegian-Irish cross-country skier (born 1995)

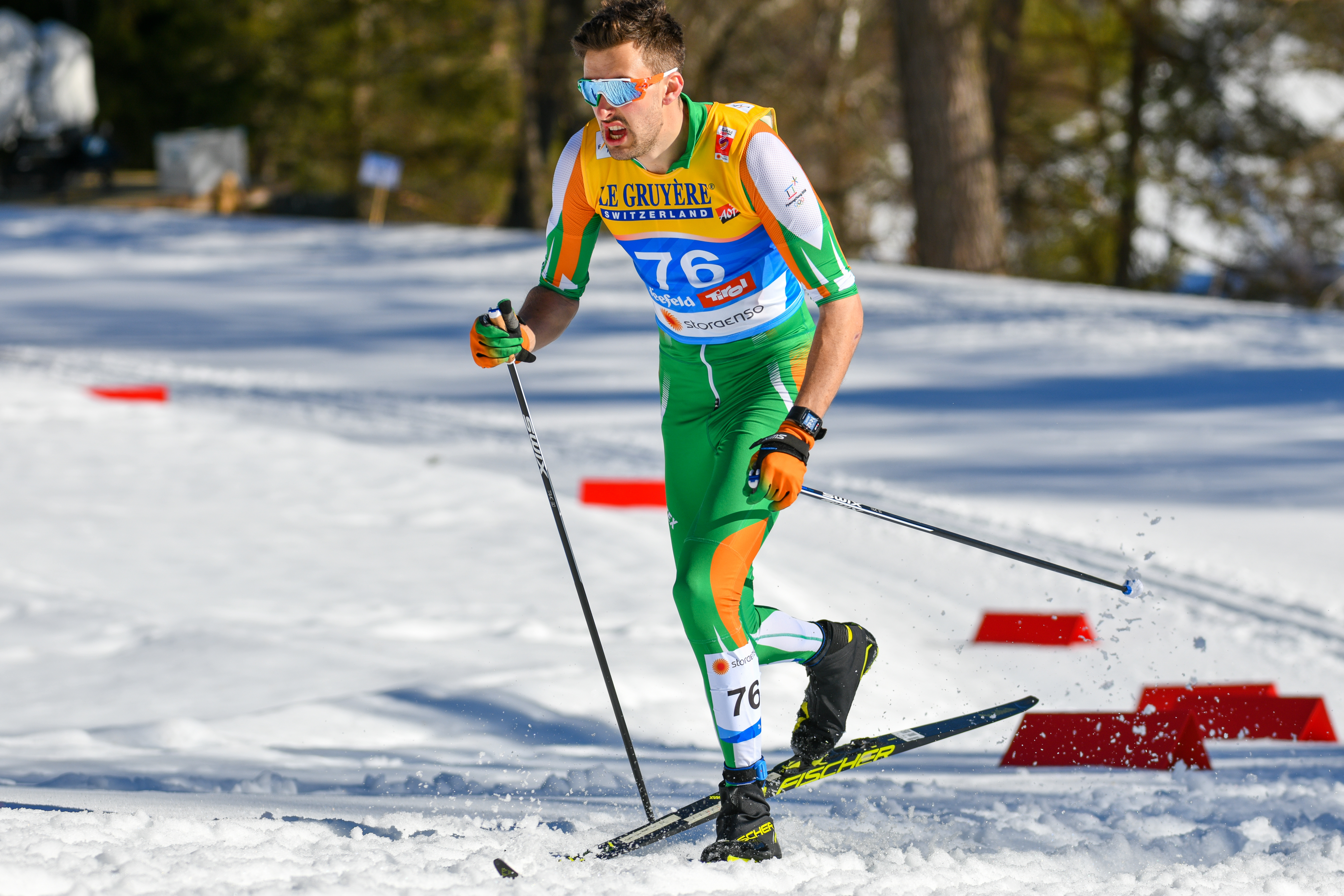
- Thomas Maloney Westgård during the World Championships in Seefeld in Tirol, Austria, in February 2019

Personal information
- Full name: Thomas Hjalmar Maloney Westgård
- Nationality: Ireland Norway
- Born: 10 October 1995 (age 30) Leka Municipality, Nord-Trøndelag, Norway

Sport
- Sport: Skiing
- Club: IL Varden Meråker

World Cup career
- Seasons: 7 – (2017–present)
- Indiv. starts: 85
- Indiv. podiums: 0
- Team starts: 0
- Overall titles: 0 – (59th in 2023)
- Discipline titles: 0
- Updated on 29 March 2023

Thomas Hjalmar Maloney Westgård (born 10 October 1995) is a Norwegian-Irish cross-country skier who competes for Ireland internationally.

Westgård was born and grew up in Leka Municipality in Norway. His father is Norwegian, and his mother is Irish, and he is a dual citizen of Ireland and Norway. He began skiing competitively in Norway at age 16 or 17. In the summer of 2016, he began representing Ireland in the World Cup. Westgård had begun his nationality transfer process in 2014, and was assisted in the process by Rory Morrish, the head of the Irish Skiing Federation. In local competitions, he represents the ski club IL Varden Meråker from Meråker, as he lived there several years whilst in Norway. Westgård's mother's family name is Maloney, and the Snowsports Association of Ireland refer to him as Thomas Maloney Westgaard.

Westgård lives in Trondheim, Norway, and is being trained by the retired champion cross-country skier Frode Estil. Since joining the Irish skiing team, Westgård has participated in the 2016–17 FIS Cross-Country World Cup, débuting for Ireland in Lillehammer, Norway, on 2 December 2016 and also taking part in further World Cup races in Estonia and Sweden.

He competed for Ireland at the FIS Nordic World Ski Championships 2017 in Lahti, Finland, one of five Irish participants in the championships. In his world championship début in the Men's sprint on 23 February 2017, Westgård ranked as number 77, while at the Men's 30 kilometre pursuit on 25 February 2017, he came in last of the participating contestants. He achieved his best result of the championship in the Men's 15 kilometre classical on 1 March 2017, ranking as 49th. Westgård brought a three-man team to the FIS Nordic World Ski Championships 2017, including his father as a helper and Irish cross-country skier Dominic McAleenan as team manager.

Westgård participated in the 2018 Winter Olympics, 2022 Winter Olympics, and 2026 Winter Olympics representing Ireland.

== Cross-country skiing results ==
All results are sourced from the International Ski Federation (FIS).

=== Olympic Games ===
Year	Age	15 km individual	30 km skiathlon	50 km mass start	Sprint
2018	22	63	60	DNS	62
2022	26	14	43	29^{[a]}	—
2026	30	54^{[b]}	35^{[b]}	23	DNS

^{a} Distance reduced to 30 km due to weather conditions.

^{b} The distances for the 2026 Olympics for the Skiathlon was brought from 30km to 20km and the 15km Individual was brought to 10km by FIS to match men's and women's event distances, the same was done for the 2025 World Championships.

=== World Championships ===
Year	15 km individual	30 km skiathlon	50 km mass start	Sprint	Team sprint
2017	47	60	—	75	—
2019	35	50	55	65	26
2021	41	32	25	44	—
2023	26	30	18	47	—
2025	41	18	13	—	33

=== World Cup ===
==== Season standings ====
Season	Discipline standings			Ski Tour standings		
Season	Overall	Distance	Sprint	Nordic Opening	Tour de Ski	Ski Tour 2020
2017	NC	NC	NC	76	—	—N/a
2018	NC	NC	NC	—	—	—N/a
2019	127	88	NC	77	—	—N/a
2020	97	62	NC	—	48	44
2021	73	58	90	61	38	—N/a
2022	142	NC	NC	—N/a	43	—N/a
2023	59	39	NC	—N/a	37	—N/a
2024	49	29	NC	—	40	—
2025	30	21	NC	—	28	—
2026	146	97	NC	—	—	—

Olympic Games
Preceded by Sarah Lavin; Shane Lowry	Flagbearer for Ireland; Milano Cortina 2026 with Anabelle Zurbay	Succeeded by Incumbent
