= Patrick-Paul Schwarzacher-Joyce =

Irish alpine skier (born 1972)

Personal information
- Nationality: Irish
- Born: 5 July 1972 (age 54) London, England

Sport
- Sport: Alpine skiing

Patrick-Paul Schwarzacher-Joyce (born 5 July 1972) is an Irish alpine skier. He competed at the 1998 Winter Olympics and the 2002 Winter Olympics. Joyce was born in London, England, to an Austrian father. He was the first skier to represent Ireland at the Olympics.
