= Seamus O'Connor =

Irish snowboarder (born 1997)

Personal information
- Born: October 4, 1997 (age 28) San Diego, California, U.S.
- Education: Christa McAuliffe Academy School of Arts and Sciences
- Years active: 14
- Height: 6 ft 1 in (185 cm)
- Weight: 180 lb (82 kg)
- Spouse: Lauren O’Connor

Sport
- Country: Ireland
- Sport: Snowboarding

Seamus O'Connor (born October 4, 1997) is an American snowboarder, from Ramona, California, who competes internationally for Ireland. He competed for Ireland at the 2014 Winter Olympics in the men's halfpipe and men's slopestyle events. He was the Irish flag bearer in the opening ceremony of the 2018 Winter Olympics. Seamus finished in eighteenth place in the Men's halfpipe qualification at the 2018 Winter Olympics.

O'Connor's paternal grandparents were born in Ireland, making him eligible to compete for the country.

He resides in Park City, Utah.

== See also ==
- Ireland at the 2014 Winter Olympics
