= Claire Bergin =

Irish bobsledder (born 1985)

Claire Bergin (born 1 February 1985) is an Irish bobsledder who has competed since 2008. She finished 17th in the two-woman event at the 2010 Winter Olympics in Vancouver. Bergin's best World Cup finish was 19th in the two-woman event at Altenberg, Germany in December 2009. Bergin is scheduled to represent Ireland as a 400 m individual and relay sprinter at the upcoming 2010 European Athletics Championships. She is currently sponsored by Integrity Solutions, Ireland's largest IT security specialist. She also competed in the 2012 Summer Olympics for Ireland in 4 × 400 m Relay. She currently works in Deloitte in Dublin.
