= David Connolly (skeleton racer) =

Irish skeleton racer

David Connolly (born 11 June 1980) is an Irish skeleton racer who competed from 2002 to 2006. He finished 20th in the men's skeleton event at the 2006 Winter Olympics in Turin.
