= Peter Donohoe (bobsleigh) =

Irish bobsledder (born 1964)

Personal information
- Nationality: Irish
- Born: 5 February 1964 (age 61); Dublin, Ireland

Sport
- Sport: Bobsleigh

Peter Donohoe (born 5 February 1964) is an Irish bobsledder. He competed at the 1998 Winter Olympics and the 2002 Winter Olympics.
