= FIS Freestyle Ski and Snowboarding World Championships 2017 – Men's ski halfpipe =

The men's ski halfpipe competition of the FIS Freestyle Ski and Snowboarding World Championships 2017 was held at Sierra Nevada, Spain on March 16 (qualifying) and March 18 (finals). 29 athletes from 11 countries competed.

== Qualification ==
The following are the results of the qualification.

Rank	Bib	Name	Country	Run 1	Run 2	Best	Notes
1	13	Mike Riddle	Canada	17.40	94.60	94.60	Q
2	7	Gus Kenworthy	United States	93.40	DNS	93.40	Q
3	6	David Wise	United States	91.40	91.40	91.40	Q
4	2	Benoit Valentin	France	84.80	90.40	90.40	Q
5	5	Noah Bowman	Canada	78.20	89.60	89.60	Q
6	10	Brendan Mackay	Canada	88.80	DNS	88.80	Q
7	1	Kévin Rolland	France	87.40	39.40	87.40	Q
8	11	Simon d'Artois	Canada	28.20	86.80	86.80	Q
9	3	Aaron Blunck	United States	85.40	41.00	85.40	Q
10	8	Birk Irving	United States	83.00	31.60	83.00	Q
11	9	Miguel Porteous	New Zealand	14.00	81.20	81.20	
12	12	Nico Porteous	New Zealand	74.80	4.80	74.80	
13	20	Lukas Müllauer	Austria	67.20	72.20	72.20	
14	23	Rafael Kreienbuehl	Switzerland	20.40	70.00	70.00	
15	14	Finn Bilous	New Zealand	34.60	67.80	67.80	
16	15	Murray Buchan	Great Britain	64.00	66.40	66.40	
17	21	Andreas Gohl	Austria	61.00	2.00	61.00	
18	26	Peter Speight	Great Britain	6.20	59.20	59.20	
19	18	Marco Ladner	Austria	57.80	13.60	57.80	
20	28	Roman Egorov	Russia	55.40	54.60	55.40	
21	16	Pavel Chupa	Russia	51.40	26.40	51.40	
22	27	Mao Bingqiang	China	46.60	3.00	46.60	
23	29	Kong Xiangrui	China	41.00	15.40	41.00	
24	31	Lee Kang-bok	South Korea	31.40	DNS	31.40	
25	25	Brendan Newby	Ireland	29.60	30.40	30.40	
26	4	Joel Gisler	Switzerland	11.20	24.20	24.20	
27	22	Ryan Murphy	New Zealand	15.60	8.60	15.60	
28	17	Frederick Iliano	Switzerland	12.80	13.60	13.60	
29	19	Kim Kwang-jin	South Korea	8.80	4.20	8.80	

== Final ==
The following are the results of the finals.

Rank	Bib	Name	Country	Run 1	Run 2	Run 3	Best
1st place, gold medalist(s)	3	Aaron Blunck	United States	91.80	41.80	85.60	91.80
2nd place, silver medalist(s)	13	Mike Riddle	Canada	72.80	89.60	89.40	89.60
3rd place, bronze medalist(s)	1	Kévin Rolland	France	88.40	13.20	49.80	88.40
4	6	David Wise	United States	18.40	14.20	87.00	87.00
5	8	Birk Irving	United States	67.20	86.80	82.80	86.80
6	5	Noah Bowman	Canada	85.80	43.80	23.40	85.80
7	10	Brendan Mackay	Canada	82.80	41.80	16.60	82.80
8	2	Benoit Valentin	France	9.20	7.20	82.60	82.60
9	11	Simon d'Artois	Canada	7.20	8.40	39.40	39.40
10	7	Gus Kenworthy	United States	6.60	18.80	24.00	24.00
