= Freestyle skiing at the 2018 Winter Olympics – Men's halfpipe =

Men's halfpipe at the XXIII Olympic Winter Games
- Venue: Bogwang Phoenix Park, Pyeongchang, South Korea
- Dates: 20 February (qualification); 22 February (final)
- Competitors: 27 from 11 nations
- Winning score: 97.20

Medalists
| 1st place, gold medalist(s) | | David Wise | United States |
| 2nd place, silver medalist(s) | | Alex Ferreira | United States |
| 3rd place, bronze medalist(s) | | Nico Porteous | New Zealand |

The men's halfpipe event in freestyle skiing at the 2018 Winter Olympics took place on 20 and 22 February 2018 at the Bogwang Phoenix Park, Pyeongchang, South Korea.

== Qualification ==
The top 30 athletes in the Olympic quota allocation list qualified, with a maximum of four athletes per National Olympic Committee (NOC) allowed. All athletes qualifying must also have placed in the top 30 of a FIS World Cup event or the FIS Freestyle Ski and Snowboarding World Championships 2017 during the qualification period (1 July 2016 to 21 January 2018) and also have a minimum of 50 FIS points to compete. If the host country, South Korea at the 2018 Winter Olympics did not qualify, their chosen athlete would displace the last qualified athlete, granted all qualification criterion was met.

== Results ==
=== Qualification ===
Q — Qualified for the Final

The top 12 athletes in the qualifiers moved on to the medal round.

| Rank | Bib | Name | Country | Run 1 | Run 2 | Best | Notes |
|---|---|---|---|---|---|---|---|
| 1 | 3 | Aaron Blunck | United States | 63.20 | 94.40 | 94.40 | Q |
| 2 | 1 | Alex Ferreira | United States | 92.60 | 43.40 | 92.60 | Q |
| 3 | 7 | Torin Yater-Wallace | United States | 89.60 | 33.60 | 89.60 | Q |
| 4 | 27 | Byron Wells | New Zealand | 88.60 | 42.00 | 88.60 | Q |
| 5 | 16 | Beau-James Wells | New Zealand | 86.20 | 88.20 | 88.20 | Q |
| 6 | 5 | Kevin Rolland | France | 87.80 | 37.80 | 87.80 | Q |
| 7 | 9 | Mike Riddle | Canada | 6.40 | 82.20 | 82.20 | Q |
| 8 | 2 | David Wise | United States | 24.80 | 79.60 | 79.60 | Q |
| 9 | 6 | Noah Bowman | Canada | 43.00 | 77.20 | 77.20 | Q |
| 10 | 8 | Thomas Krief | France | 74.40 | 25.80 | 74.40 | Q |
| 11 | 15 | Nico Porteous | New Zealand | 51.20 | 72.80 | 72.80 | Q |
| 12 | 19 | Andreas Gohl | Austria | 68.60 | 31.60 | 68.60 | Q |
| 13 | 4 | Simon d'Artois | Canada | 66.60 | 40.40 | 66.60 | |
| 14 | 21 | Murray Buchan | Great Britain | 66.00 | 65.40 | 66.00 | |
| 15 | 12 | Peter Speight | Great Britain | 3.80 | 64.60 | 64.60 | |
| 16 | 20 | Lukas Müllauer | Austria | 17.00 | 63.60 | 63.60 | |
| 17 | 22 | Miguel Porteous | New Zealand | 40.40 | 62.60 | 62.60 | |
| 18 | 10 | Joel Gisler | Switzerland | 59.80 | 9.80 | 59.80 | |
| 19 | 14 | Rafael Kreienbühl | Switzerland | 55.20 | 22.20 | 55.20 | |
| 20 | 24 | Mao Bingqiang | China | 53.00 | 54.60 | 54.60 | |
| 21 | 18 | Marco Ladner | Austria | 54.20 | 39.40 | 54.20 | |
| 22 | 23 | Brendan Newby | Ireland | 53.80 | 53.80 | 53.80 | |
| 23 | 26 | Kong Xiangrui | China | 47.40 | 50.80 | 50.80 | |
| 24 | 13 | Pavel Chupa | Olympic Athletes from Russia | 46.80 | 25.80 | 46.80 | |
| 25 | 11 | Robin Briguet | Switzerland | 23.00 | 29.40 | 29.40 | |
| 26 | 17 | Alexander Glavatsky-Yeadon | Great Britain | 10.80 | 15.00 | 15.00 | |
| 27 | 25 | Lee Kang-bok | South Korea | 5.80 | 13.00 | 13.00 | |

=== Final ===
The final was held on 22 February 2018 at 12:22.

| Rank | Start Order | Bib | Name | Country | Run 1 | Run 2 | Run 3 | Best | Notes |
|---|---|---|---|---|---|---|---|---|---|
| 1st place, gold medalist(s) | 5 | 2 | David Wise | United States | 17.00 | 6.40 | 97.20 | 97.20 | |
| 2nd place, silver medalist(s) | 11 | 1 | Alex Ferreira | United States | 92.60 | 96.00 | 96.40 | 96.40 | |
| 3rd place, bronze medalist(s) | 2 | 15 | Nico Porteous | New Zealand | 82.40 | 94.80 | 30.00 | 94.80 | |
| 4 | 8 | 16 | Beau-James Wells | New Zealand | 87.40 | 52.20 | 91.60 | 91.60 | |
| 5 | 4 | 6 | Noah Bowman | Canada | 89.40 | 19.20 | 11.20 | 89.40 | |
| 6 | 6 | 9 | Mike Riddle | Canada | 85.40 | 26.00 | 27.40 | 85.40 | |
| 7 | 12 | 3 | Aaron Blunck | United States | 81.40 | 5.60 | 84.80 | 84.80 | |
| 8 | 1 | 19 | Andreas Gohl | Austria | 14.60 | 46.00 | 68.80 | 68.80 | |
| 9 | 10 | 7 | Torin Yater-Wallace | United States | 65.20 | 28.80 | 12.20 | 65.20 | |
| 10 | 3 | 8 | Thomas Krief | France | 9.80 | DNS | DNS | 9.80 | |
| 11 | 7 | 5 | Kevin Rolland | France | 6.40 | 6.40 | 5.60 | 6.40 | |
| 12 | 9 | 27 | Byron Wells | New Zealand | DNS | DNS | DNS | DNS | |
