= Freestyle skiing at the 2022 Winter Olympics – Men's halfpipe =

Men's halfpipe at the XXIV Olympic Winter Games
- Freestyle skiing
- Venue: Genting Snow Park, Zhangjiakou
- Date: 17, 19 February 2022
- Competitors: 23 from 11 nations
- Winning time: 93.00

Medalists
1st place, gold medalist(s)		Nico Porteous	New Zealand
2nd place, silver medalist(s)		David Wise	United States
3rd place, bronze medalist(s)		Alex Ferreira	United States

The men's halfpipe competition in freestyle skiing at the 2022 Winter Olympics was held on 17 February (qualification) and 19 February (final), at the Genting Snow Park in Zhangjiakou. The podium consisted of all the medalists in the same event in 2018, but in a different order. Nico Porteous of New Zealand, the 2018 bronze medalist, won the event, bringing to New Zealand the second ever winter Olympic gold medal. David Wise of the United States, the champion in both previous events, won the silver medal, and Alex Ferreira, also of the United States, the 2018 silver medalist, this time won bronze.

At the 2021–22 FIS Freestyle Ski World Cup, there were four events held before the Olympics, and Brendan Mackay and Ferreira were tied for the first place in the rankings, followed by Porteous and Wise. Porteous is also the 2021 X-Games winner in super-pipe, as well as the 2021 world champion.

== Qualification ==
A total of 25 athletes qualified to compete at the games. For an athlete to compete they must have a minimum of 50.00 FIS points on the FIS Points List on January 17, 2022 and a top 30 finish in a World Cup event or at the FIS Freestyle Ski World Championships 2021. A country could enter a maximum of four athletes into the event.

== Results ==
=== Qualification ===
Q — Qualified for the Final

The top 12 athletes in the qualifiers moved on to the medal round.

Rank	Bib	Order	Name	Country	Run 1	Run 2	Best	Notes
1	1	2	Aaron Blunck	United States	26.25	92.00	92.00	Q
2	2	4	Nico Porteous	New Zealand	75.50	90.50	90.50	Q
3	6	19	Birk Irving	United States	83.25	89.75	89.75	Q
4	8	23	David Wise	United States	88.75	89.00	89.00	Q
5	4	3	Brendan Mackay	Canada	87.25	85.00	87.25	Q
6	5	1	Noah Bowman	Canada	78.25	85.50	85.50	Q
7	3	5	Alex Ferreira	United States	84.25	69.50	84.25	Q
8	7	16	Simon d'Artois	Canada	82.50	68.25	82.50	Q
9	12	12	Miguel Porteous	New Zealand	81.00	31.75	81.00	Q
10	10	7	Kevin Rolland	France	65.25	75.25	75.25	Q
11	15	15	Robin Briguet	Switzerland	72.25	3.00	72.25	Q
12	9	6	Gus Kenworthy	Great Britain	8.50	70.75	70.75	Q
13	13	14	Ben Harrington	New Zealand	69.25	23.50	69.25	
14	17	22	Mao Bingqiang	China	62.75	66.25	66.25	
15	16	9	Rafael Kreienbühl	Switzerland	60.50	4.00	60.50	
16	22	20	Lee Seung-hoon	South Korea	49.75	56.75	56.75	
17	20	10	Marco Ladner	Austria	53.50	6.50	53.50	
18	21	11	Sun Jingbo	China	4.25	48.75	48.75	
19	18	21	Gustav Legnavsky	New Zealand	48.25	40.75	48.25	
20	23	8	Brendan Newby	Ireland	10.75	47.00	47.00	
21	19	13	He Binghan	China	45.00	17.75	45.00	
22	24	17	Wang Haizhuo	China	37.00	9.25	37.00	
23	14	18	Jon Sallinen	Finland	18.00	18.50	18.50	

=== Final ===
Rank	Bib	Order	Name	Country	Run 1	Run 2	Run 3	Best
1st place, gold medalist(s)	2	11	Nico Porteous	New Zealand	93.00	30.75	9.25	93.00
2nd place, silver medalist(s)	8	9	David Wise	United States	90.75	7.75	40.00	90.75
3rd place, bronze medalist(s)	3	6	Alex Ferreira	United States	86.75	83.75	67.75	86.75
4	5	7	Noah Bowman	Canada	84.25	84.75	21.25	84.75
5	6	10	Birk Irving	United States	80.00	32.50	48.00	80.00
6	10	3	Kevin Rolland	France	54.75	77.25	79.25	79.25
7	1	12	Aaron Blunck	United States	70.25	78.25	13.50	78.25
8	9	1	Gus Kenworthy	Great Britain	17.50	3.75	71.25	71.25
9	4	8	Brendan Mackay	Canada	4.00	65.50	27.00	65.50
10	7	5	Simon d'Artois	Canada	7.25	7.00	63.75	63.75
11	12	4	Miguel Porteous	New Zealand	63.50	4.25	30.50	63.50
12	15	2	Robin Briguet	Switzerland	21.75	6.75	3.00	21.75
