= List of Olympic medalists in freestyle skiing =

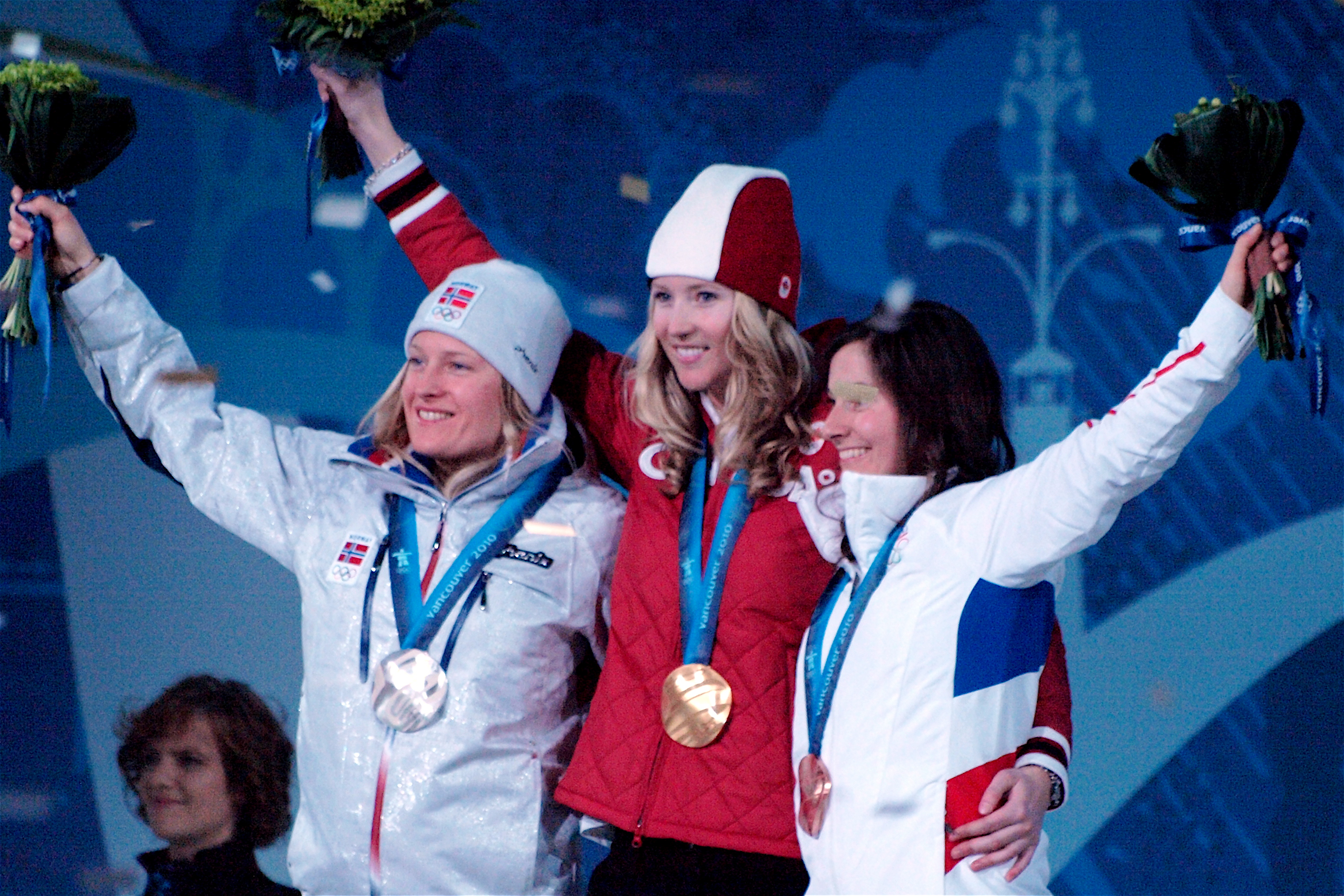
The medalists of the inaugural women's ski cross event at the 2010 Winter Olympics. From left to right: Hedda Berntsen of Norway (silver), Ashleigh McIvor of Canada (gold), and Marion Josserand of France (bronze).

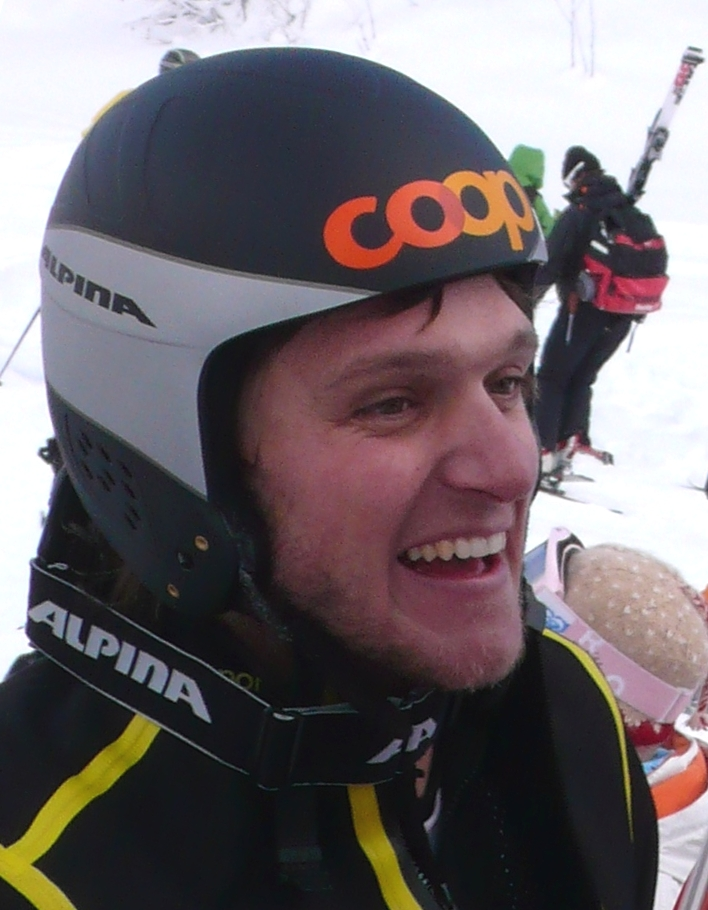
In 2010, Michael Schmid of Switzerland won the inaugural men's ski cross event with a perfect sheet: first place in every race of the qualifying and elimination rounds.

Freestyle skiing is one of the six skiing disciplines contested at the Winter Olympic Games, and one of the youngest. In 1924, the first Winter Olympics featured Nordic skiing disciplines (cross-country skiing, ski jumping, and Nordic combined), while alpine skiing was first contested in 1936. Only at the 1992 Winter Olympics, in Albertville, France, were freestyle skiing events first held as official medal events. Before that, freestyle skiing was contested at the 1988 Winter Olympics as a demonstration sport, consisting of events for both men and women in three variants: moguls, aerials and ski ballet. In Albertville, moguls was the first-ever official freestyle skiing medal event; aerials and ski ballet were also held but still as demonstration events. The growing popularity of aerials convinced the International Olympic Committee (IOC) to add this freestyle discipline to the 1994 Winter Olympics official program. Moguls and aerials have thus been contested at every Winter Games since. Ski cross inclusion in the Winter Olympics program was approved at an IOC Executive Board meeting in November 2006, and the first events were held at the 2010 Winter Olympics.

At the 2002 Winter Olympics, two days after Steve Bradbury gave Australia its first-ever Winter Olympic gold medal, Alisa Camplin won the freestyle aerials event, becoming the first Australian woman to win gold at the Winter Games; four years later, she collected a second consecutive medal, a bronze. In 2010, the third Olympics hosted by Canada finally consecrated a Canadian athlete as Olympic champion: Alexandre Bilodeau took the gold medal in the men's moguls, overcoming defending champion Dale Begg-Smith of Australia. Eileen Gu of China is the most successful freestyle skier regardless of gender, having won six medals (three gold, three silver) across two Olympics. Mikaël Kingsbury of Canada is the most successful male freestyle skier, with five medals (two gold, three silver) across four Olympics. The youngest freestyle skier to win an Olympic medal is Swiss Mathilde Gremaud, who secured a silver in 2018 with 18 years old, while Tatjana Mittermayer of Germany is the oldest medalist, following her silver in the 1998 moguls event, aged 33.

Overall, 132 medals (44 of each color) have been awarded to skiers representing 22 National Olympic Committees (NOC).

== Men ==
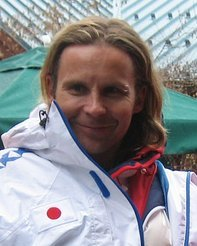
Janne Lahtela of Finland (pictured) and Dale Begg-Smith of Australia have won two medals each (one gold and one silver) in the men's moguls.

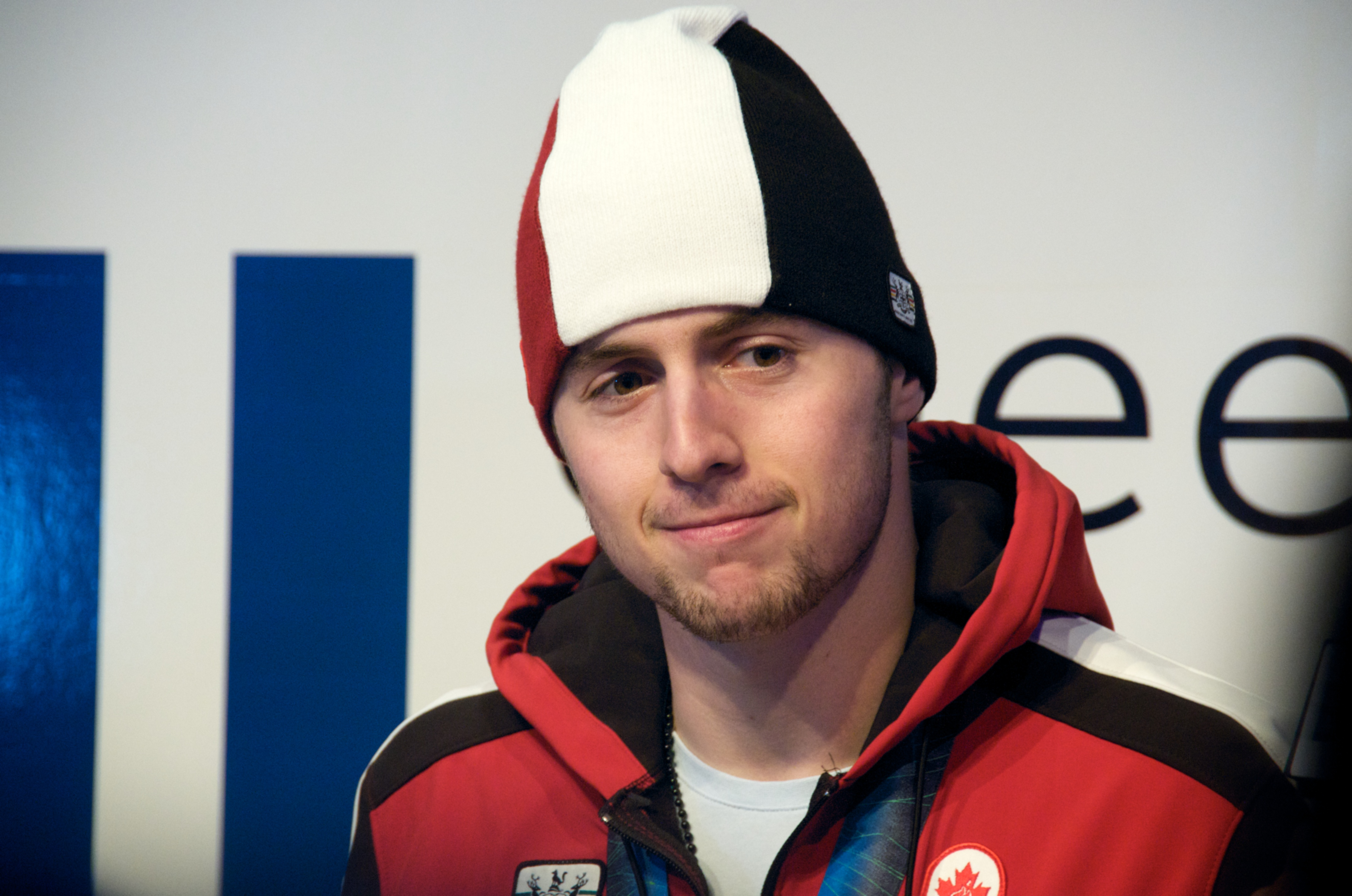
Alexandre Bilodeau's victory in the 2010 men's moguls event made him the first-ever Canadian to win a gold medal at an Olympic Games held in Canada. In 2014, he became the first Olympic champion in moguls who defended his title.

=== Moguls ===
Games	Gold	Silver	Bronze
1992 Albertville	Edgar Grospiron; France	Olivier Allamand; France	Nelson Carmichael; United States
1994 Lillehammer	Jean-Luc Brassard; Canada	Sergey Shupletsov; Russia	Edgar Grospiron; France
1998 Nagano	Jonny Moseley; United States	Janne Lahtela; Finland	Sami Mustonen; Finland
2002 Salt Lake City	Janne Lahtela; Finland	Travis Mayer; United States	Richard Gay; France
2006 Turin	Dale Begg-Smith; Australia	Mikko Ronkainen; Finland	Toby Dawson; United States
2010 Vancouver	Alexandre Bilodeau; Canada	Dale Begg-Smith; Australia	Bryon Wilson; United States
2014 Sochi	Alexandre Bilodeau; Canada	Mikaël Kingsbury; Canada	Alexandr Smyshlyaev; Russia
2018 Pyeongchang	Mikaël Kingsbury; Canada	Matt Graham; Australia	Daichi Hara; Japan
2022 Beijing	Walter Wallberg; Sweden	Mikaël Kingsbury; Canada	Ikuma Horishima; Japan
2026 Milano Cortina	Cooper Woods-Topalovic; Australia	Mikaël Kingsbury; Canada	Ikuma Horishima; Japan

Medals
Rank	Nation	Gold	Silver	Bronze	Total
1	Canada	4	3	0	7
2	Australia	2	2	0	4
3	Finland	1	2	1	4
4	United States	1	1	3	5
5	France	1	1	2	4
6	Sweden	1	0	0	1
7	Russia	0	1	1	2
8	Japan	0	0	3	3
Total	8 nations	10	10	10	30

=== Dual moguls ===
Games	Gold	Silver	Bronze
2026 Milano Cortina	Mikaël Kingsbury; Canada	Ikuma Horishima; Japan	Matt Graham; Australia

Medals
Rank	Nation	Gold	Silver	Bronze	Total
1	Canada	1	0	0	1
2	Japan	0	1	0	1
3	Australia	0	0	1	1
Total	3 nations	1	1	1	3

=== Aerials ===
Games	Gold	Silver	Bronze
1994 Lillehammer	Andreas Schönbächler; Switzerland	Philippe LaRoche; Canada	Lloyd Langlois; Canada
1998 Nagano	Eric Bergoust; United States	Sébastien Foucras; France	Dmitri Dashinski; Belarus
2002 Salt Lake City	Aleš Valenta; Czech Republic	Joe Pack; United States	Aleksei Grishin; Belarus
2006 Turin	Han Xiaopeng; China	Dmitri Dashinski; Belarus	Vladimir Lebedev; Russia
2010 Vancouver	Aleksei Grishin; Belarus	Jeret Peterson; United States	Liu Zhongqing; China
2014 Sochi	Anton Kushnir; Belarus	David Morris; Australia	Jia Zongyang; China
2018 Pyeongchang	Oleksandr Abramenko; Ukraine	Jia Zongyang; China	Ilya Burov; Olympic Athletes from Russia
2022 Beijing	Qi Guangpu; China	Oleksandr Abramenko; Ukraine	Ilya Burov; ROC
2026 Milano Cortina	Wang Xindi; China	Noé Roth; Switzerland	Li Tianma; China

- Medals:

Rank	Nation	Gold	Silver	Bronze	Total
1	China	3	1	3	7
2	Belarus	2	1	2	5
3	United States	1	2		3
4	Ukraine	1	1		2
5	Czechoslovakia; Switzerland	1			1
8	Australia; France		1		1
9	Olympic Athletes from Russia; Russia; ROC			1	1

=== Big air ===
Games	Gold	Silver	Bronze
2022 Beijing	Birk Ruud; Norway	Colby Stevenson; United States	Henrik Harlaut; Sweden
2026 Milano Cortina	Tormod Frostad; Norway	Mac Forehand; United States	Matěj Švancer; Austria

- Medals:

Rank	Nation	Gold	Silver	Bronze	Total
1	Norway	2	0	0	2
2	United States	0	2	0	2
3	Sweden	0	0	1	1
3	Austria	0	0	1	1
Total	4 nations	2	2	2	6

=== Halfpipe ===
Games	Gold	Silver	Bronze
2014 Sochi	David Wise; United States	Mike Riddle; Canada	Kevin Rolland; France
2018 Pyeongchang	David Wise; United States	Alex Ferreira; United States	Nico Porteous; New Zealand
2022 Beijing	Nico Porteous; New Zealand	David Wise; United States	Alex Ferreira; United States
2026 Milano Cortina	Alex Ferreira; United States	Henry Sildaru; Estonia	Brendan Mackay; Canada

=== Ski cross ===
Games	Gold	Silver	Bronze
2010 Vancouver	Michael Schmid; Switzerland	Andreas Matt; Austria	Audun Grønvold; Norway
2014 Sochi	Jean-Frédéric Chapuis; France	Arnaud Bovolenta; France	Jonathan Midol; France
2018 Pyeongchang	Brady Leman; Canada	Marc Bischofberger; Switzerland	Sergey Ridzik; Olympic Athletes from Russia
2022 Beijing	Ryan Regez; Switzerland	Alex Fiva; Switzerland	Sergey Ridzik; ROC
2026 Milano Cortina	Simone Deromedis; Italy	Federico Tomasoni; Italy	Alex Fiva; Switzerland

=== Slopestyle ===
Games	Gold	Silver	Bronze
2014 Sochi	Joss Christensen; United States	Gus Kenworthy; United States	Nick Goepper; United States
2018 Pyeongchang	Øystein Bråten; Norway	Nick Goepper; United States	Alex Beaulieu-Marchand; Canada
2022 Beijing	Alex Hall; United States	Nick Goepper; United States	Jesper Tjäder; Sweden
2026 Milano Cortina	Birk Ruud; Norway	Alex Hall; United States	Luca Harrington; New Zealand

Medals
Rank	Nation	Gold	Silver	Bronze	Total
1	United States	2	4	1	7
2	Norway	2	0	0	2
3	Canada	0	0	1	1
3	New Zealand	0	0	1	1
3	Sweden	0	0	1	1
Total	5 nations	4	4	4	12

== Women ==
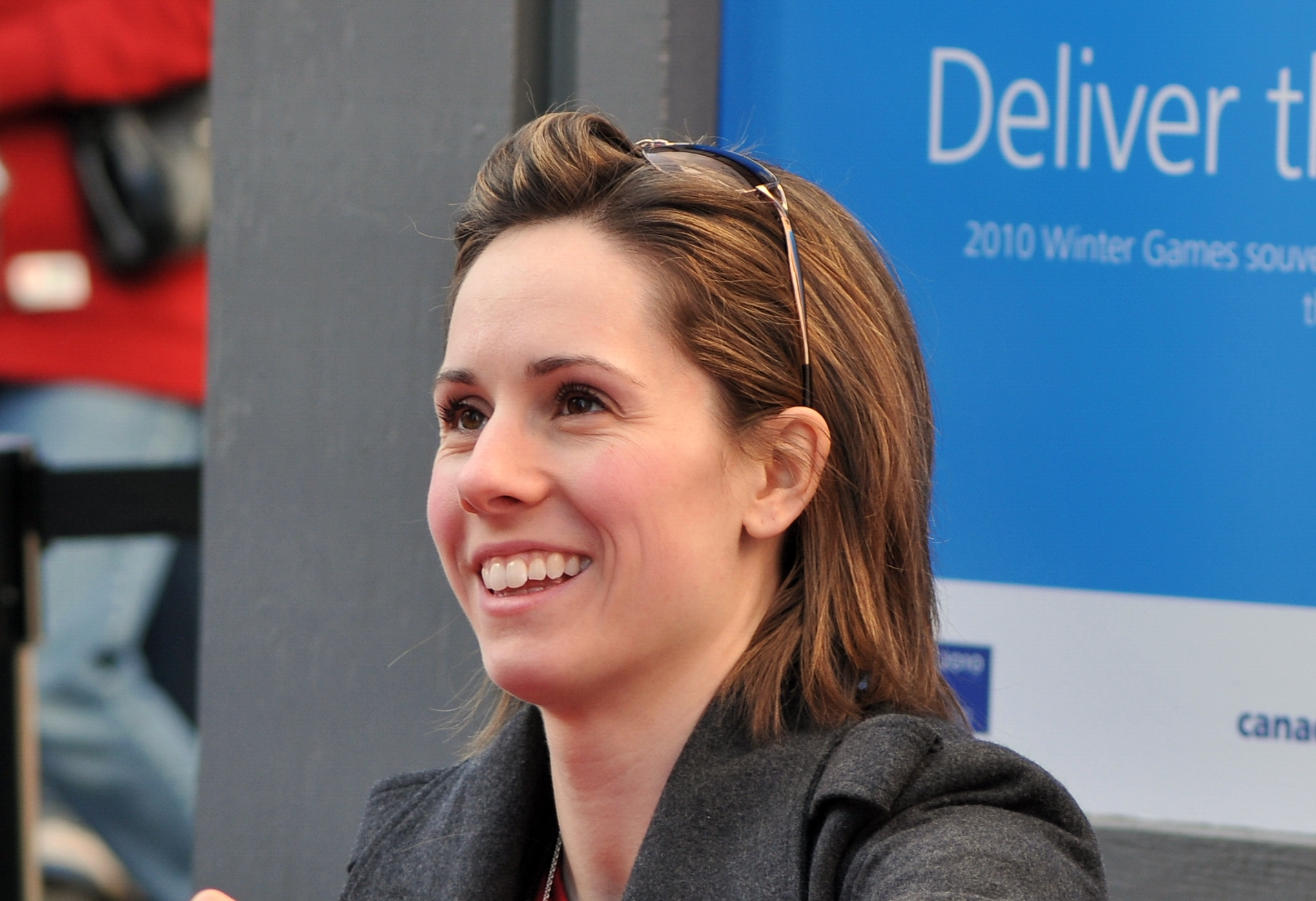
Canadian skier Jennifer Heil won the women's Olympic moguls event in 2006, and achieved a silver medal in 2010.

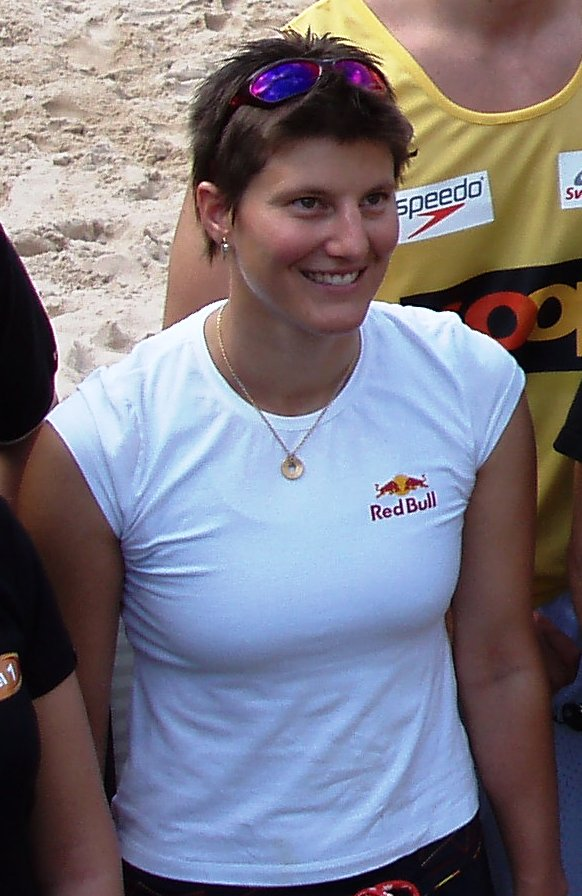
Evelyne Leu of Switzerland, gold medalist in the women's aerials event at the 2006 Winter Olympics

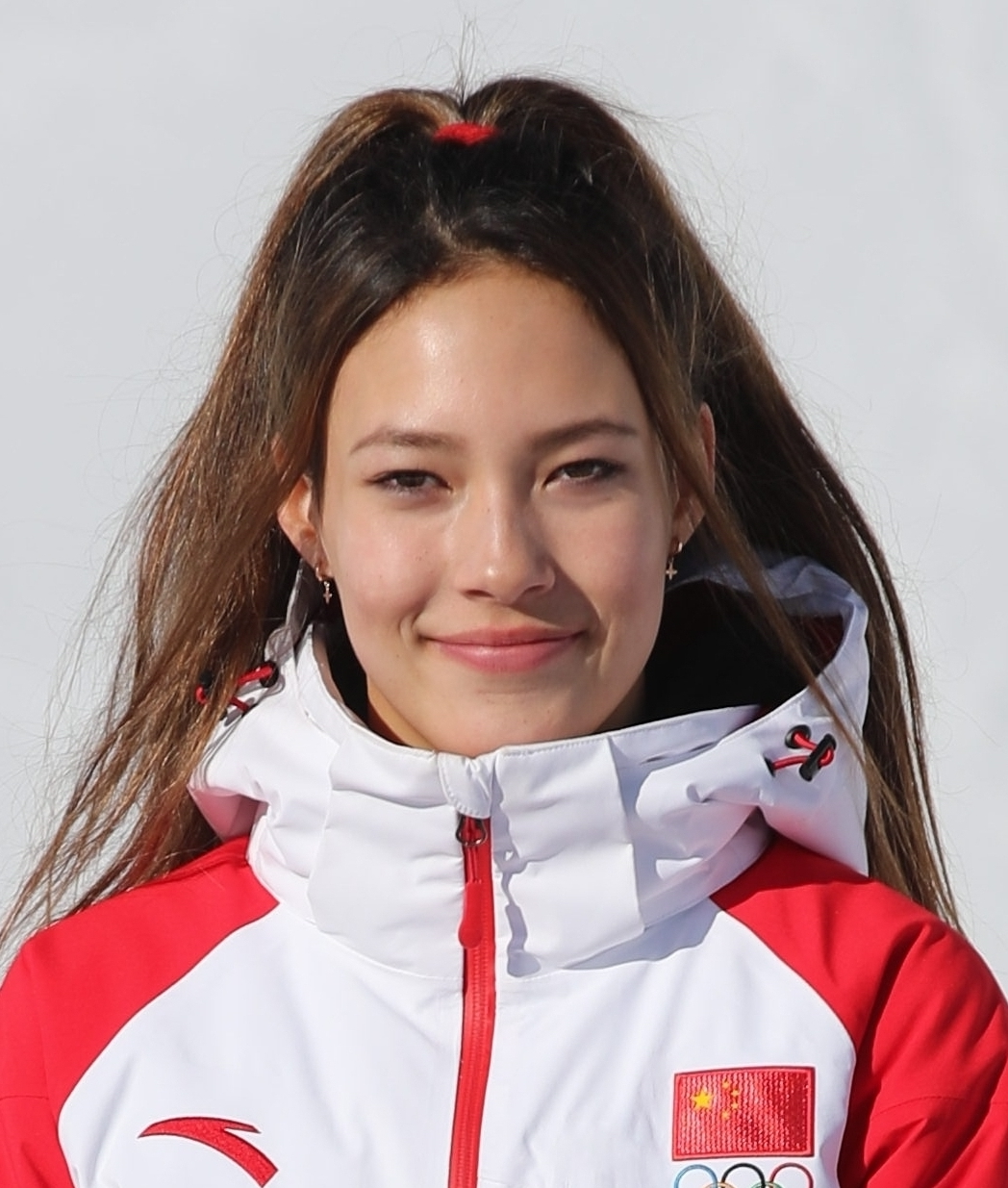
Eileen Gu, representing China, became the first freestyle skier to win three medals at a Winter Olympics in 2022. She then repeated that feat in 2026.

=== Moguls ===
Games	Gold	Silver	Bronze
1992 Albertville	Donna Weinbrecht; United States	Yelizaveta Kozhevnikova; Unified Team	Stine Lise Hattestad; Norway
1994 Lillehammer	Stine Lise Hattestad; Norway	Elizabeth McIntyre; United States	Yelizaveta Kozhevnikova; Russia
1998 Nagano	Tae Satoya; Japan	Tatjana Mittermayer; Germany	Kari Traa; Norway
2002 Salt Lake City	Kari Traa; Norway	Shannon Bahrke; United States	Tae Satoya; Japan
2006 Turin	Jennifer Heil; Canada	Kari Traa; Norway	Sandra Laoura; France
2010 Vancouver	Hannah Kearney; United States	Jennifer Heil; Canada	Shannon Bahrke; United States
2014 Sochi	Justine Dufour-Lapointe; Canada	Chloé Dufour-Lapointe; Canada	Hannah Kearney; United States
2018 Pyeongchang	Perrine Laffont; France	Justine Dufour-Lapointe; Canada	Yuliya Galysheva; Kazakhstan
2022 Beijing	Jakara Anthony; Australia	Jaelin Kauf; United States	Anastasiia Smirnova; ROC
2026 Milano Cortina	Elizabeth Lemley; United States	Jaelin Kauf; United States	Perrine Laffont; France

Medals
Rank	Nation	Gold	Silver	Bronze	Total
1	United States	3	4	2	9
2	Canada	2	3	0	5
3	Norway	2	1	2	5
4	France	1	0	2	3
5	Japan	1	0	1	2
6	Australia	1	0	0	1
7	Germany	0	1	0	1
7	Unified Team	0	1	0	1
9	Kazakhstan	0	0	1	1
9	ROC	0	0	1	1
9	Russia	0	0	1	1
Total	11 nations	10	10	10	30

=== Dual moguls ===
Games	Gold	Silver	Bronze
2026 Milano Cortina	Jakara Anthony; Australia	Jaelin Kauf; United States	Elizabeth Lemley; United States

Medals
Rank	Nation	Gold	Silver	Bronze	Total
1	Australia	1	0	0	1
2	United States	0	1	1	2
Total	2 nations	1	1	1	3

=== Aerials ===
Games	Gold	Silver	Bronze
1994 Lillehammer	Lina Cheryazova; Uzbekistan	Marie Lindgren; Sweden	Hilde Synnøve Lid; Norway
1998 Nagano	Nikki Stone; United States	Xu Nannan; China	Colette Brand; Switzerland
2002 Salt Lake City	Alisa Camplin; Australia	Veronica Brenner; Canada	Deidra Dionne; Canada
2006 Turin	Evelyne Leu; Switzerland	Li Nina; China	Alisa Camplin; Australia
2010 Vancouver	Lydia Lassila; Australia	Li Nina; China	Guo Xinxin; China
2014 Sochi	Alla Tsuper; Belarus	Xu Mengtao; China	Lydia Lassila; Australia
2018 Pyeongchang	Hanna Huskova; Belarus	Zhang Xin; China	Kong Fanyu; China
2022 Beijing	Xu Mengtao; China	Hanna Huskova; Belarus	Megan Nick; United States
2026 Milano-Cortina	Xu Mengtao; China	Danielle Scott; Australia	Shao Qi; China

- Medals:

Rank	Nation	Gold	Silver	Bronze	Total
1	Belarus	2	1		3
2	Australia	2		2	4
3	China	1	5	2	8
4	Switzerland	1		1	2
5	United States; Uzbekistan	1			1
7	Canada		1	1	2
8	Norway			1	1

=== Big Air ===
Games	Gold	Silver	Bronze
2022 Beijing	Eileen Gu; China	Tess Ledeux; France	Mathilde Gremaud; Switzerland
2026 Milano Cortina	Megan Oldham; Canada	Eileen Gu; China	Flora Tabanelli; Italy

Medals
Rank	Nation	Gold	Silver	Bronze	Total
1	China	1	1	0	2
2	Canada	1	0	0	1
3	France	0	1	0	1
4	Switzerland	0	0	1	1
4	Italy	0	0	1	1
Total	5 nations	2	2	2	6

=== Halfpipe ===
Games	Gold	Silver	Bronze
2014 Sochi	Maddie Bowman; United States	Marie Martinod; France	Ayana Onozuka; Japan
2018 Pyeongchang	Cassie Sharpe; Canada	Marie Martinod; France	Brita Sigourney; United States
2022 Beijing	Eileen Gu; China	Cassie Sharpe; Canada	Rachael Karker; Canada
2026 Milano Cortina	Eileen Gu; China	Li Fanghui; China	Zoe Atkin; Great Britain

=== Ski cross ===
Games	Gold	Silver	Bronze
2010 Vancouver	Ashleigh McIvor; Canada	Hedda Berntsen; Norway	Marion Josserand; France
2014 Sochi	Marielle Thompson; Canada	Kelsey Serwa; Canada	Anna Holmlund; Sweden
2018 Pyeongchang	Kelsey Serwa; Canada	Brittany Phelan; Canada	Fanny Smith; Switzerland
2022 Beijing	Sandra Näslund; Sweden	Marielle Thompson; Canada	Daniela Maier; Germany
2022 Beijing	Sandra Näslund; Sweden	Marielle Thompson; Canada	Fanny Smith; Switzerland
2026 Milano Cortina	Daniela Maier; Germany	Fanny Smith; Switzerland	Sandra Näslund; Sweden

=== Slopestyle ===
Games	Gold	Silver	Bronze
2014 Sochi	Dara Howell; Canada	Devin Logan; United States	Kim Lamarre; Canada
2018 Pyeongchang	Sarah Höfflin; Switzerland	Mathilde Gremaud; Switzerland	Isabel Atkin; Great Britain
2022 Beijing	Mathilde Gremaud; Switzerland	Eileen Gu; China	Kelly Sildaru; Estonia
2026 Milan Cortina	Mathilde Gremaud; Switzerland	Eileen Gu; China	Megan Oldham; Canada

Medals
Rank	Nation	Gold	Silver	Bronze	Total
1	Switzerland	3	1	0	4
2	Canada	1	0	2	3
3	China	0	2	0	2
4	United States	0	1	0	1
5	Estonia	0	0	1	1
5	Great Britain	0	0	1	1
Total	6 nations	4	4	4	12

== Mixed ==
=== Aerials team ===
Games	Gold	Silver	Bronze
2022 Beijing	United States; Ashley Caldwell; Connor Curran; Christopher Lillis	China; Xu Mengtao; Jia Zongyang; Qi Guangpu	Canada; Marion Thénault; Miha Fontaine; Lewis Irving
2026 Milano Cortina	United States; Kaila Kuhn; Connor Curran; Christopher Lillis	Switzerland; Lina Kozomara; Pirmin Werner; Noé Roth	China; Xu Mengtao; Wang Xindi; Li Tianma

== Statistics ==
=== Athlete medal leaders ===
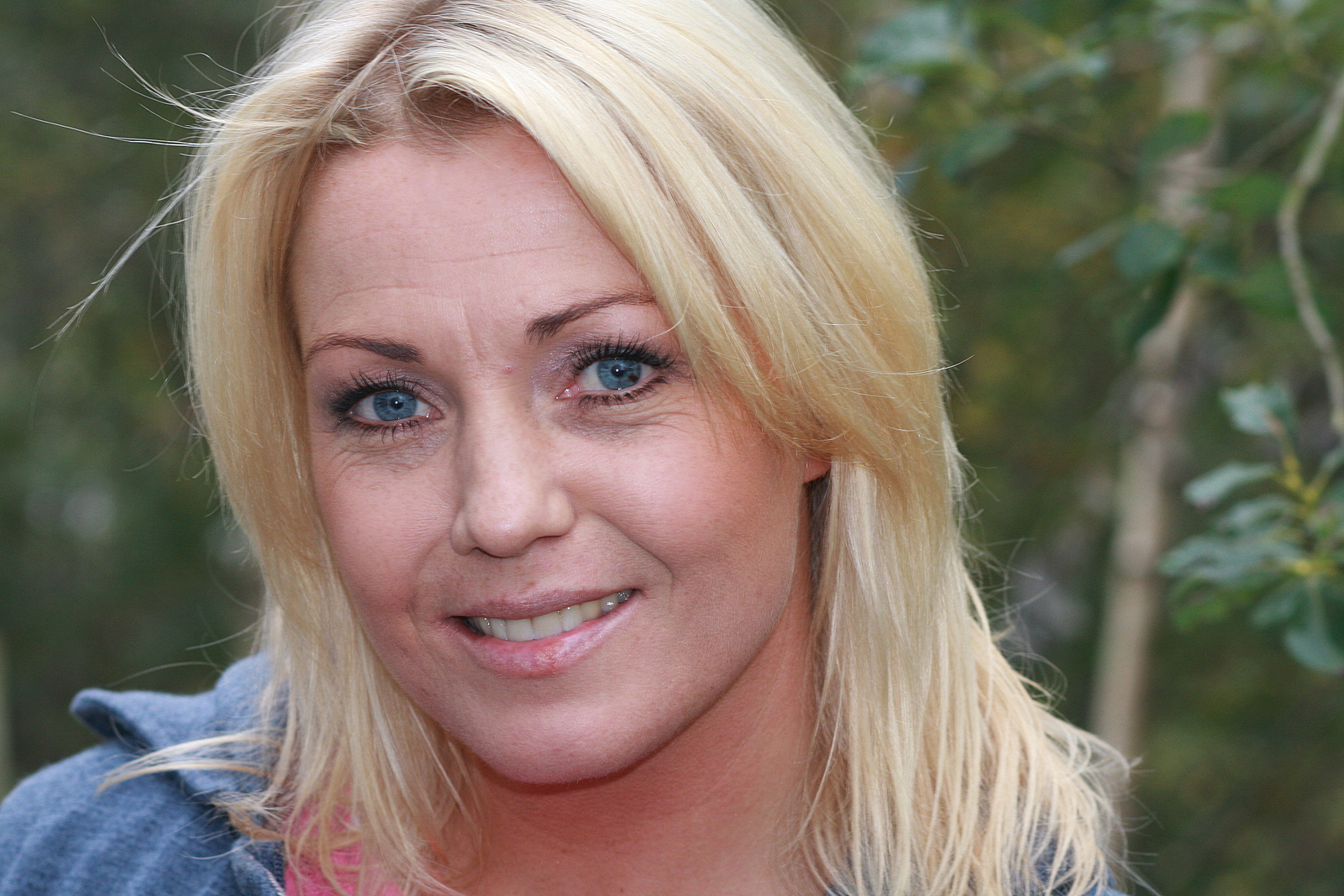
Norway's Kari Traa is the most successful Olympic moguls skier, with three medals in the women's moguls event: one gold (2002), one silver (2006), and one bronze (1998).

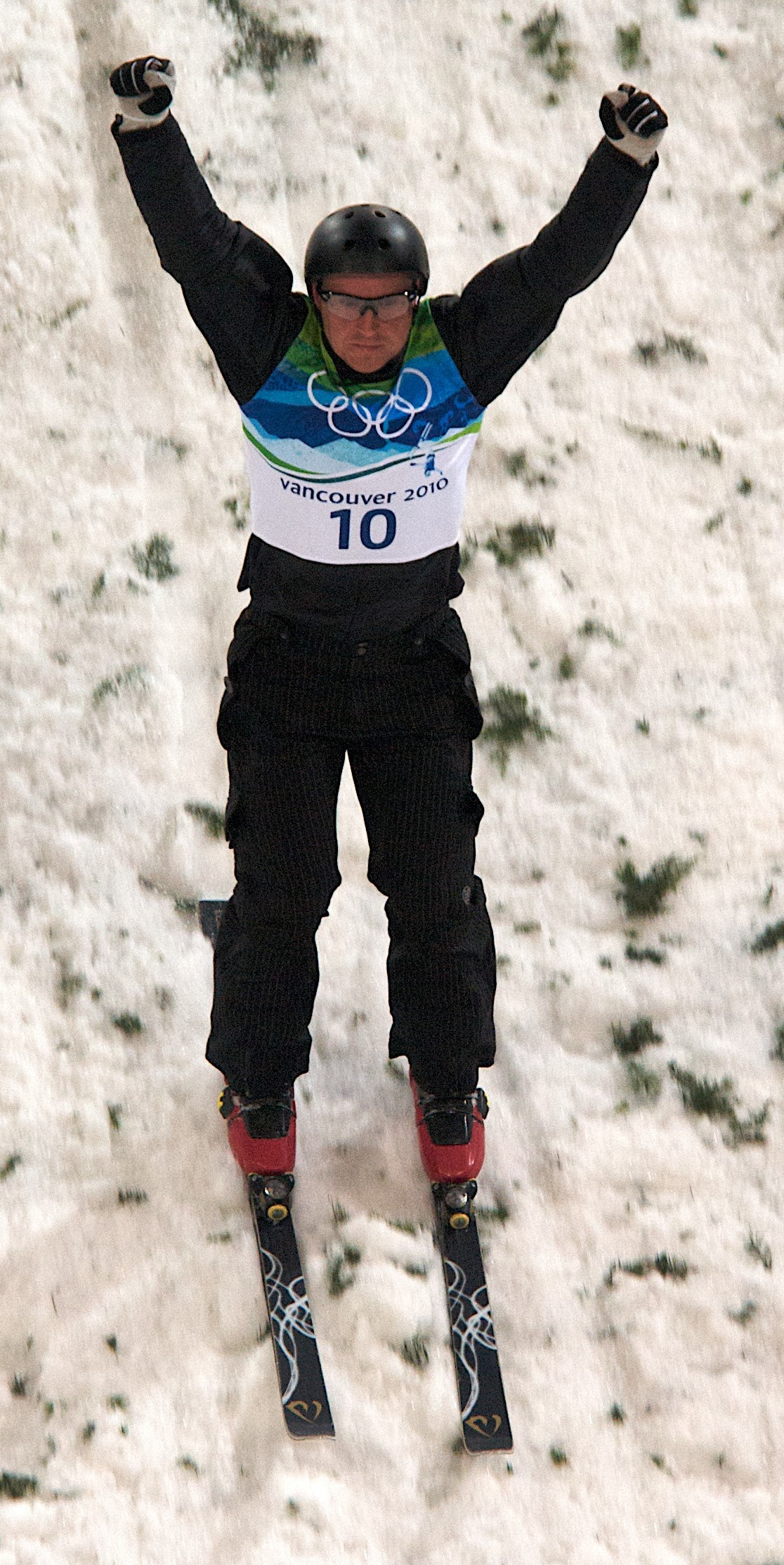
After a bronze medal in 2002 and a fourth place in 2006, Belarusian skier Aleksei Grishin secured the gold medal in the men's aerials event at the 2010 Games.

Athletes who won at least two medals are listed below.

Key

Women's events

Athlete	Nation	Event	Olympics	Gold	Silver	Bronze	Total
Eileen Gu	China	Women's big air Women's slopestyle Women's halfpipe	2022−2026	3	3	0	6
David Wise	United States	Men's halfpipe	2014–2022	2	1	0	3
Alexandre Bilodeau	Canada	Men's moguls	2006–2014	2	0	0	2
Xu Mengtao	China	Women's aerials Mixed team aerials	2010–2022	1	2	0	3
Kari Traa	Norway	Women's moguls	1998–2006	1	1	1	3
Mathilde Gremaud	Switzerland	Women's big air Women's slopestyle	2018–2022	2	1	1	4
Mikaël Kingsbury	Canada	Men's moguls, Dual moguls	2014–2026	2	3	0	5
Jaelin Kauf	United States	Women's moguls Women's dual moguls	2022–2026	0	3	0	3
Jia Zongyang	China	Men's aerials Mixed team aerials	2010–2022	0	2	1	3
Fanny Smith	Switzerland	Women's ski cross	2018–2026	0	1	2	3
Qi Guangpu	China	Men's aerials Mixed team aerials	2010–2022	1	1	0	2
Justine Dufour-Lapointe	Canada	Women's moguls	2014–2018	1	1	0	2
Kelsey Serwa	Canada	Women's ski cross	2010–2018	1	1	0	2
Dale Begg-Smith	Australia	Men's moguls	2006–2014	1	1	0	2
Jennifer Heil	Canada	Women's moguls	2002–2010	1	1	0	2
Janne Lahtela	Finland	Men's moguls	1998–2002	1	1	0	2
Alex Hall	United States	Men's slopestyle	2022–2026	1	1	0	2
Daniela Maier	Germany	Women's ski cross	2022–2026	1	0	1	2
Sandra Näslund	Sweden	Women's ski cross	2022–2026	1	0	1	2
Hannah Kearney	United States	Women's moguls	2006–2014	1	0	1	2
Lydia Lassila	Australia	Women's aerials	2002–2014	1	0	1	2
Alisa Camplin	Australia	Women's aerials	2002–2006	1	0	1	2
Aleksei Grishin	Belarus	Men's aerials	2002–2010	1	0	1	2
Tae Satoya	Japan	Women's moguls	1994–2006	1	0	1	2
Edgar Grospiron	France	Men's moguls	1992–1994	1	0	1	2
Stine Lise Hattestad	Norway	Women's moguls	1992–1994	1	0	1	2
Li Nina	China	Women's aerials	2006–2014	0	2	0	2
Marie Martinod	France	Women's halfpipe	2014–2018	0	2	0	2
Shannon Bahrke	United States	Women's moguls	2002–2010	0	1	1	2
Dmitri Dashinski	Belarus	Men's aerials	1998–2006	0	1	1	2
Yelizaveta Kozhevnikova	Unified Team; Russia	Women's moguls	1992–1994	0	1	1	2
Nick Goepper	United States	Men's slopestyle	2014–2018	0	1	1	2

=== Medals per year ===
×	NOC did not exist	#	Number of medals won by the NOC	–	NOC did not win any medals

Nation	1924–88	92	94	98	02	06	10	14	18	22	26	Total
Australia		–	–	–	1	2	2	2	1	1	4	13
Austria		–	–	–	–	–	1	–	–	–	1	2
Belarus		×	–	1	1	1	1	2	1	1	×	8
Canada		–	3	–	2	1	3	9	7	5	5	35
China		–	–	1	–	2	3	2	3	6	9	26
Czech Republic		×	–	–	1	–	–	–	–	–	–	1
Estonia		×	–	–	–	–	–	–	–	1	1	2
Finland		–	–	2	1	1	–	–	–	–	–	4
France		2	1	1	1	1	1	5	2	1	1	16
Germany		–	–	1	–	–	–	–	–	–	1	2
Great Britain		–	–	–	–	×	–	–	1	–	1	2
Italy		–	–	–	–	–	–	–	–	–	3	3
Japan		–	–	1	1	–	–	1	1	1	2	7
Kazakhstan		×	–	–	–	–	–	–	1	–	–	1
New Zealand		×	×	–	×	–	–	–	1	1	1	3
Norway		1	2	1	1	1	2	–	1	1	2	12
Olympic Athletes from Russia		×	×	×	×	×	×	×	2	×	×	2
ROC (ROC)		×	×	×	×	×	×	×	×	3	×	3
Russia		×	2	–	–	1	–	1	×	×	×	4
Sweden		–	1	–	–	–	–	1	–	4	1	7
Switzerland		–	1	1	–	1	1	–	4	5	5	18
Ukraine		×	–	–	–	–	–	–	1	1	–	2
Unified Team		1	×	×	×	×	×	×	×	×	×	1
United States		2	1	3	3	1	4	7	4	8	8	41
Uzbekistan		×	1	–	×	×	×	×	×	×	×	1
Total	1924–88	6	12	12	12	12	18	30	30	40	45	

=== Medal sweep events ===
These are events in which athletes from one NOC won all three medals.

Games	Event	NOC	Gold	Silver	Bronze
2014 Sochi	Men's slopestyle	United States	Joss Christensen	Gus Kenworthy	Nick Goepper
2014 Sochi	Men's ski cross	France	Jean-Frédéric Chapuis	Arnaud Bovolenta	Jonathan Midol

== See also ==
- Lists of Olympic medalists
- Freestyle skiing at the Winter Olympics
- List of Olympic venues in freestyle skiing
- FIS Freestyle World Ski Championships
- FIS Freestyle Ski World Cup
