= FIS Freestyle Ski and Snowboarding World Championships 2019 – Men's ski halfpipe =

Men's ski halfpipe at the FIS Freestyle Ski and Snowboarding World Championships 2019
- Venue: Park City Mountain Resort
- Location: Utah, United States
- Dates: February 7–9
- Competitors: 24 from 11 nations
- Winning points: 94.20

Medalists
gold medal	Aaron Blunck	United States
silver medal	Kevin Rolland	France
bronze medal	Noah Bowman	Canada

The Men's ski halfpipe competition at the FIS Freestyle Ski and Snowboarding World Championships 2019 was held on February 7 and 9, 2019.

== Qualification ==
The qualification was started on February 7, at 13:30. The best ten skiers qualified for the final.

Rank	Bib	Start order	Name	Country	Run 1	Run 2	Best	Notes
1	2	1	David Wise	United States	92.00	18.00	92.00	Q
2	1	6	Simon d'Artois	Canada	82.40	91.80	91.80	Q
3	6	3	Aaron Blunck	United States	9.80	91.60	91.60	Q
4	4	5	Alex Ferreira	United States	73.00	91.40	91.40	Q
5	10	2	Kevin Rolland	France	91.20	10.60	91.20	Q
6	17	22	Birk Ruud	Norway	89.60	41.00	89.60	Q
7	3	10	Nico Porteous	New Zealand	87.00	68.00	87.00	Q
8	5	7	Noah Bowman	Canada	84.00	86.40	86.40	Q
9	9	4	Taylor Seaton	United States	85.20	83.20	85.20	Q
10	7	8	Thomas Krief	France	25.00	84.60	84.60	Q
11	8	9	Brendan MacKay	Canada	70.20	84.00	84.00	
12	16	24	Evan Marineau	Canada	45.00	83.80	83.80	
13	12	18	Birk Irving	United States	83.60	64.60	83.60	
14	18	11	Andreas Gohl	Austria	4.40	73.80	73.80	
15	13	15	Robin Briguet	Switzerland	63.80	37.40	63.80	
16	15	13	Roman Egorov	Russia	59.80	36.60	59.80	
17	52	12	Felix Coudouy	France	56.00	6.00	56.00	
18	24	16	Brendan Newby	Ireland	50.40	41.00	50.40	
19	23	19	Sam Ward	Great Britain	49.40	45.40	49.40	
20	11	14	Mao Bingqiang	China	45.80	36.40	45.80	
21	14	20	He Binghan	China	40.60	39.00	40.60	
22	20	17	Sun Jingbo	China	39.80	37.80	39.80	
23	22	21	Marco Ladner	Austria	24.80	5.00	24.80	
24	19	23	Li Songsheng	China	3.80	3.00	3.80	

== Final ==
The final was started on February 9, at 19:00.

Rank	Bib	Name	Country	Run 1	Run 2	Run 3	Best	Notes
1st place, gold medalist(s)	8	Aaron Blunck	United States	91.80	42.00	94.20	94.20	
2nd place, silver medalist(s)	6	Kevin Rolland	France	93.80	33.00	33.80	93.80	
3rd place, bronze medalist(s)	3	Noah Bowman	Canada	90.00	43.00	91.60	91.60	
4	9	Simon d'Artois	Canada	91.00	91.40	28.80	91.40	
5	5	Birk Ruud	Norway	7.40	28.00	88.20	88.20	
6	1	Thomas Krief	France	12.60	16.20	87.00	87.00	
7	10	David Wise	United States	80.60	86.60	86.00	86.60	
8	7	Alex Ferreira	United States	84.20	30.40	83.00	84.20	
9	4	Nico Porteous	New Zealand	31.00	33.20	83.60	83.60	
10	2	Taylor Seaton	United States	82.80	30.40	18.80	82.80	
