= FIS Freestyle Ski and Snowboarding World Championships 2021 – Men's ski halfpipe =

Men's ski halfpipe at the FIS Freestyle Ski and Snowboarding World Championships 2021
- Venue: Aspen/Snowmass
- Location: Aspen, United States
- Date: 10 March (qualification); 12 March
- Competitors: 22 from 10 nations
- Winning points: 94.50

Medalists
gold medal	Nico Porteous	New Zealand
silver medal	Simon d'Artois	Canada
bronze medal	Birk Irving	United States

The Men's ski halfpipe competition at the FIS Freestyle Ski and Snowboarding World Championships 2021 was held on 12 March. A qualification will be held on 10 March 2021.

== Qualification ==
The qualification was started on 10 March at 09:50. The best ten skiers qualified for the final.

Rank	Bib	Start order	Name	Country	Run 1	Run 2	Best	Notes
1	5	5	Brendan Mackay	Canada	94.25	83.00	94.25	Q
2	4	2	Birk Irving	United States	91.75	92.50	92.50	Q
3	2	1	Noah Bowman	Canada	90.00	30.75	90.00	Q
4	18	18	Nico Porteous	New Zealand	88.75	20.50	88.75	Q
5	1	8	Aaron Blunck	United States	87.75	21.25	87.75	Q
6	3	3	Simon d'Artois	Canada	83.25	86.75	86.75	Q
7	6	6	David Wise	United States	86.00	27.25	86.00	Q
8	9	9	Kevin Rolland	France	77.25	15.25	77.25	Q
9	13	11	Alex Ferreira	United States	71.50	74.25	74.25	Q
10	19	15	Rafael Kreienbühl	Switzerland	68.25	32.00	68.25	Q
11	8	7	Lyman Currier	United States	35.75	67.50	67.50	
12	7	10	Gus Kenworthy	Great Britain	65.50	67.25	67.25	
13	15	21	Evan Marineau	Canada	66.75	45.00	66.75	
14	10	4	Birk Ruud	Norway	59.75	60.25	60.25	
15	22	13	Ben Harrington	New Zealand	58.00	36.50	58.00	
16	24	20	Gustav Legnavsky	New Zealand	57.25	57.25	57.25	
17	17	17	Andreas Gohl	Austria	56.75	41.25	56.75	
18	20	12	Marco Ladner	Austria	55.50	5.25	55.50	
19	21	19	Jon Sallinen	Finland	48.75	14.75	48.75	
20	12	22	Robin Briguet	Switzerland	7.75	47.50	47.50	
21	11	14	Miguel Porteous	New Zealand	41.50	21.25	41.50	
22	23	16	Brendan Newby	Ireland	28.50	40.00	40.00	

== Final ==
The final was started at 13:00.

Rank	Bib	Start order	Name	Country	Run 1	Run 2	Run 3	Best
1st place, gold medalist(s)	18	7	Nico Porteous	New Zealand	94.50	43.00	78.00	94.50
2nd place, silver medalist(s)	3	5	Simon d'Artois	Canada	26.50	91.25	84.50	91.25
3rd place, bronze medalist(s)	4	9	Birk Irving	United States	89.75	4.50	DNS	89.75
4	13	2	Alex Ferreira	United States	19.50	84.75	35.25	84.75
5	1	6	Aaron Blunck	United States	83.25	30.25	30.50	83.25
6	19	1	Rafael Kreienbühl	Switzerland	71.50	52.25	26.00	71.50
7	5	10	Brendan Mackay	Canada	35.25	54.75	44.75	54.75
8	9	3	Kevin Rolland	France	9.50	49.00	DNS	49.00
9	2	8	Noah Bowman	Canada	42.00	29.25	37.75	42.00
10	6	4	David Wise	United States	4.75	30.75	28.50	30.75
