= FIS Freestyle Ski and Snowboarding World Championships 2023 – Men's ski halfpipe =

Men's ski halfpipe at the FIS Freestyle Ski and Snowboarding World Championships 2023
- Location: Bakuriani, Georgia
- Dates: 1 March (qualification); 4 March
- Competitors: 17 from 8 nations
- Winning points: 97.25

Medalists
gold medal	Brendan Mackay	Canada
silver medal	Jon Sallinen	Finland
bronze medal	Alex Ferreira	United States

The Men's ski halfpipe competition at the FIS Freestyle Ski and Snowboarding World Championships 2023 was held on 1 and 4 March 2023.

== Qualification ==
The qualification was started on 1 March at 12:15. The best ten skiers qualified for the final.

Rank	Bib	Start order	Name	Country	Run 1	Run 2	Best	Notes
1	2	8	Brendan Mackay	Canada	94.25	97.25	97.25	Q
2	3	4	David Wise	United States	92.00	95.75	95.75	Q
3	4	10	Jon Sallinen	Finland	89.25	91.50	91.50	Q
4	5	5	Simon D'Artois	Canada	90.25	82.75	90.25	Q
5	1	3	Alex Ferreira	United States	88.00	25.75	88.00	Q
6	10	2	Kevin Rolland	France	85.25	8.25	85.25	Q
7	7	1	Dylan Ladd	United States	80.00	84.75	84.75	Q
8	6	9	Tristan Feinberg	United States	84.25	77.00	84.25	Q
9	9	6	Ben Harrington	New Zealand	83.25	23.25	83.25	Q
10	15	14	Robin Briguet	Switzerland	75.75	56.00	75.75	Q
11	16	15	Lee Seung-hun	South Korea	22.50	75.00	75.00	
12	12	17	Andrew Longino	Canada	57.75	74.75	74.75	
13	11	16	Gustav Legnavsky	New Zealand	25.75	74.50	74.50	
14	13	12	Toma Matsuura	Japan	71.75	74.00	74.00	
15	8	7	Dylan Marineau	Canada	68.50	19.00	68.50	
16	17	13	Sun Jingbo	Japan	49.75	51.25	51.25	
17	14	11	Rafael Kreienbühl	Switzerland	16.25	15.50	16.25	
	18	18	Michael Oravec	Slovakia	Did not start			

== Final ==
The final was started on 4 March at 10:00.

Rank	Bib	Start order	Name	Country	Run 1	Run 2	Run 3	Best
1st place, gold medalist(s)	2	10	Brendan Mackay	Canada	94.00	42.75	97.25	97.25
2nd place, silver medalist(s)	4	8	Jon Sallinen	Finland	90.00	26.50	95.75	95.75
3rd place, bronze medalist(s)	1	6	Alex Ferreira	United States	86.75	79.00	93.00	93.00
4	5	7	Simon D'Artois	Canada	84.75	76.00	92.00	92.00
5	9	2	Ben Harrington	New Zealand	82.00	25.00	31.50	82.00
6	7	4	Dylan Ladd	United States	37.50	30.25	81.25	81.25
7	10	5	Kevin Rolland	France	75.00	80.50	23.50	80.50
8	6	3	Tristan Feinberg	United States	12.25	76.75	15.25	76.75
9	3	9	David Wise	United States	70.00	19.50	12.25	70.00
10	15	1	Robin Briguet	Switzerland	54.25	12.25	41.75	54.25
