= New Zealand at the 2022 Winter Olympics =

- IOC code: NZL
- NOC: New Zealand Olympic Committee
- Website: www.olympic.org.nz

in Beijing, China 4–20 February 2022
- Competitors: 15 (9 men and 6 women) in 5 sports
- Flag bearers (opening): Alice Robinson; Finn Bilous
- Flag bearer (closing): Nico Porteous
- Medals Ranked 17th: Gold 2 Silver 1 Bronze 0 Total 3

Winter Olympics appearances (overview)
- 1952; 1956; 1960; 1964; 1968; 1972; 1976; 1980; 1984; 1988; 1992; 1994; 1998; 2002; 2006; 2010; 2014; 2018; 2022; 2026

New Zealand competed at the 2022 Winter Olympics in Beijing, China, from 4 to 20 February 2022. The New Zealand team consisted of 15 athletes—nine men and six women—who competed in five sports. Selection of the New Zealand team was the responsibility of the New Zealand Olympic Committee (NZOC).

Alice Robinson and Finn Bilous were the country's flagbearers for the opening ceremony. Nico Porteous was the New Zealand flagbearer at the closing ceremony.

Zoi Sadowski-Synnott became New Zealand's first Winter Olympics gold medallist when she won the women's snowboarding slopestyle. Sadowski-Synnott also won a silver medal, in the women's snowboarding big air. Later in the Games, Nico Porteous won the gold medal in the men's freestyle skiing halfpipe, to become the first New Zealand man and youngest New Zealander to win a Winter Olympics gold medal. With two gold medals and one silver medal, placing New Zealand 17th on the medal table, the 2022 Winter Olympics were the country's most successful since first competing at the Winter Games in 1952.

== Medallists ==
Medal	Name	Sport	Event	Date
Gold	Zoi Sadowski-Synnott	Snowboarding	Women's slopestyle	6 February
Gold	Nico Porteous	Freestyle skiing	Men's halfpipe	19 February
Silver	Zoi Sadowski-Synnott	Snowboarding	Women's big air	15 February

== Competitors ==
The following table lists of number of New Zealand competitors who participated at the Games by gender and sport.

Sport	Men	Women	Total
Alpine skiing	0	1	1
Biathlon	1	0	1
Freestyle skiing	6	3	9
Snowboarding	1	2	3
Speed skating	1	0	1
Total	9	6	15

== Alpine skiing ==
New Zealand qualified one male and three female alpine skiers but chose to only use one female quota.

The NZOC announced the first alpine skier on 19 September 2021.

Athlete	Event	Run 1		Run 2		Total	
Athlete	Event	Time	Rank	Time	Rank	Time	Rank
Alice Robinson	Women's downhill	—N/a				1:35.57	25
Alice Robinson	Women's giant slalom	1:00.55	25	1:00.27	24	2:00.82	=22
Alice Robinson	Women's super-G	—N/a				DNF	

== Biathlon ==
New Zealand qualified one male athlete.

Athlete	Event	Time	Misses	Rank
Campbell Wright	Men's 10 km sprint	27:14.1	2 (1+1)	75
Campbell Wright	Men's 20 km individual	52:59.8	2 (0+1+1+0)	32

== Cross-country skiing ==
By meeting the basic qualification standards New Zealand qualified one male cross-country skier, but rejected their quota.

== Freestyle skiing ==
The NZOC announced the first three freestyle skiers on 19 September 2021, adding six more on 20 January 2022.

Athlete	Event	Qualification					Final				
Athlete	Event	Run 1	Run 2	Run 3	Best	Rank	Run 1	Run 2	Run 3	Best	Rank
Ben Barclay	Men's big air	81.00	78.25	84.50	162.75	16	Did not advance				
Ben Barclay	Men's slopestyle	76.00	77.71	—N/a	77.71	7 Q	29.16	29.78	67.40	67.40	10
Anja Barugh	Women's halfpipe	38.50	12.25	—N/a	38.50	19	Did not advance				
Finn Bilous	Men's big air	73.75	68.75	82.00	155.75	18	Did not advance				
Finn Bilous	Men's slopestyle	68.01	32.85	—N/a	68.01	15	Did not advance				
Margaux Hackett	Women's big air	9.75	9.00	65.00	74.75	22	Did not advance				
Margaux Hackett	Women's slopestyle	54.93	37.28	—N/a	54.93	16	Did not advance				
Ben Harrington	Men's halfpipe	69.25	23.50	—N/a	69.25	13	Did not advance				
Gustav Legnavsky	Men's halfpipe	48.25	40.75	—N/a	48.25	19	Did not advance				
Chloe McMillan	Women's halfpipe	41.75	43.50	—N/a	43.50	18	Did not advance				
Miguel Porteous	Men's halfpipe	81.00	31.75	—N/a	81.00	9 Q	63.50	4.25	30.50	63.50	11
Nico Porteous	Men's halfpipe	75.50	90.50	—N/a	90.50	2 Q	93.00	30.75	9.25	93.00	1st place, gold medalist(s)

== Snowboarding ==
The NZOC announced the first snowboarder on 19 September 2021, adding two more snowboarders on 20 January 2022.

Athlete	Event	Qualification					Final				
Athlete	Event	Run 1	Run 2	Run 3	Best	Rank	Run 1	Run 2	Run 3	Best	Rank
Tiarn Collins	Men's big air	71.25	~~14.25~~	21.25	92.50	23	Did not advance				
Tiarn Collins	Men's slopestyle	58.36	29.21	—N/a	58.36	18	did not advance				
Zoi Sadowski-Synnott	Women's big air	85.50	62.25	91.00	176.50	1 Q	93.25	83.75	30.25	177.00	2nd place, silver medalist(s)
Zoi Sadowski-Synnott	Women's slopestyle	73.58	86.75	—N/a	86.75	1 Q	84.51	28.15	92.88	92.88	1st place, gold medalist(s)
Cool Wakushima	Women's big air	Withdrew due to injury					did not advance				
Cool Wakushima	Women's slopestyle	34.46	DNS	—N/a	34.46	23	did not advance				

== Speed skating ==
The NZOC announced the first speed skater on 19 January 2020.

Individual

Athlete	Event	Race	
Athlete	Event	Time	Rank
Peter Michael	Men's 1500 m	1:48.68	26
Peter Michael	Men's 10,000 m	13:33.53	12

Mass start

Athlete	Event	Semifinals			Final		
Athlete	Event	Points	Time	Rank	Points	Time	Rank
Peter Michael	Men's	2	7:58.04	9	did not advance		18
