= Freestyle skiing at the 2018 Winter Olympics =

Freestyle skiing at the XXIII Olympic Winter Games
- Pictograms from top, left to right: Aerials, Halfpipe, Moguls, Ski Cross, and Slopestyle.
- Venue: Bokwang Phoenix Park
- Dates: 9–23 February
- No. of events: 10 (5 men, 5 women)
- Competitors: 268 from 27 nations

Freestyle skiing at the 2018 Winter Olympics was held at the Bokwang Phoenix Park in Pyeongchang, South Korea. The events were scheduled to take place between 9 and 23 February 2018. A total of ten freestyle skiing events were held.

== Qualification ==
A maximum of 282 quota spots were available to athletes at the games. A maximum of 30 athletes could be entered by a National Olympic Committee, with a maximum of 16 men or 16 women. Each event had a specific quota amount allocated to it.

== Competition schedule ==
The following was the competition schedule for all ten events.

Sessions that included the event finals are shown in bold.

All times are (UTC+9).

Date	Time	Event
9 February	10:00	Women's moguls
9 February	11:45	Men's moguls
11 February	19:30	**Women's moguls**
12 February	19:30	**Men's moguls**
15 February	20:00	Women's aerials
16 February	20:00	**Women's aerials**
17 February	10:00	**Women's ski slopestyle**
17 February	20:00	Men's aerials
18 February	10:00	**Men's ski slopestyle**
18 February	20:00	**Men's aerials**
19 February	10:00	Women's ski halfpipe
20 February	10:30	**Women's ski halfpipe**
20 February	13:15	Men's ski halfpipe
21 February	11:30	**Men's ski cross**
22 February	10:00	Women's ski cross
22 February	11:30	**Men's ski halfpipe**
23 February	10:00	**Women's ski cross**

== Medal summary ==
=== Medal table ===
Rank	Nation	Gold	Silver	Bronze	Total
1	Canada	4	2	1	7
2	Switzerland	1	2	1	4
2	United States	1	2	1	4
4	France	1	1	0	2
5	Belarus	1	0	0	1
5	Norway	1	0	0	1
5	Ukraine	1	0	0	1
8	China	0	2	1	3
9	Australia	0	1	0	1
10	Olympic Athletes from Russia	0	0	2	2
11	Great Britain	0	0	1	1
11	Japan	0	0	1	1
11	Kazakhstan	0	0	1	1
11	New Zealand	0	0	1	1
Totals (14 entries)		10	10	10	30

=== Men's events ===
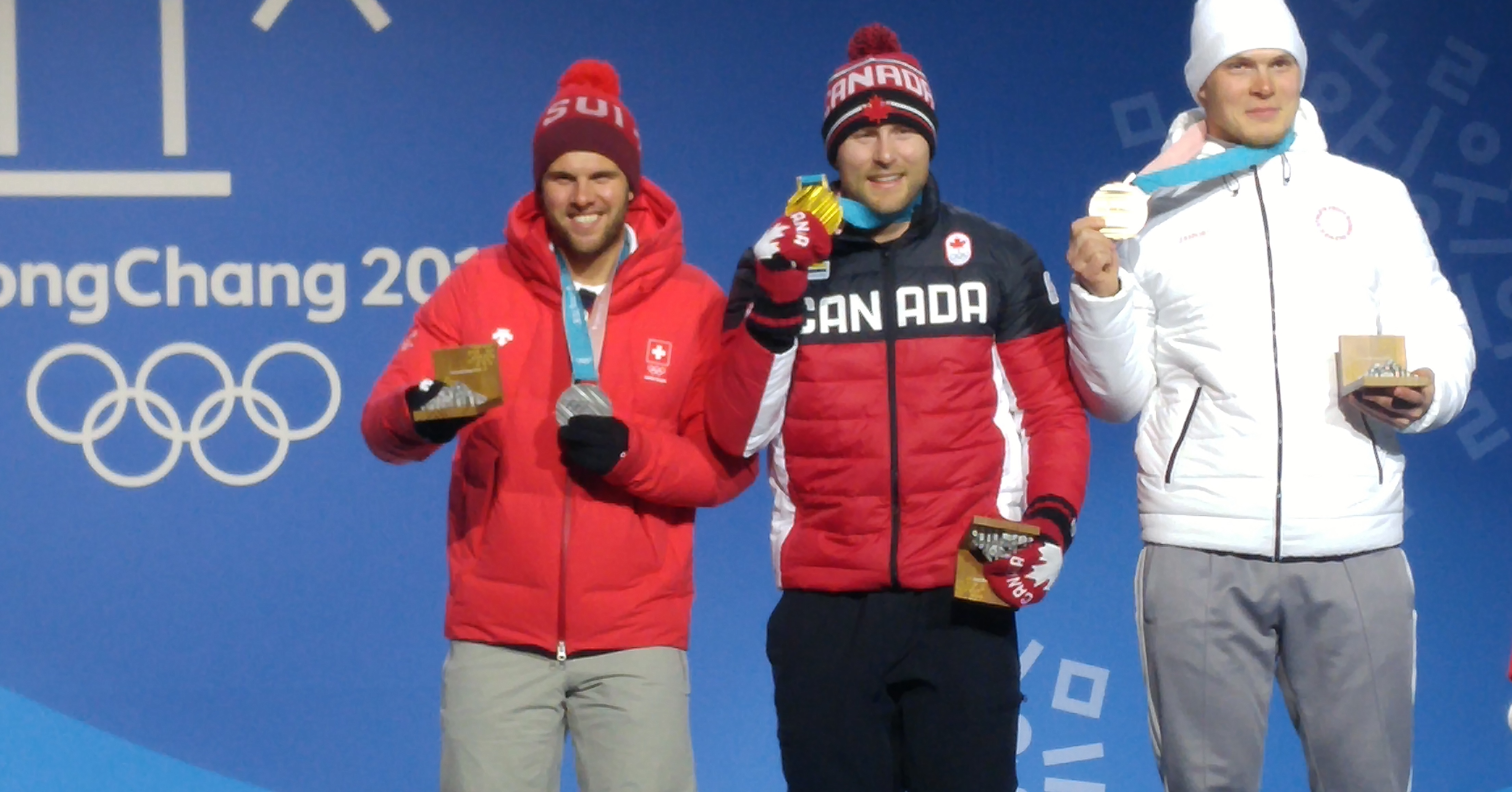
Ski cross podium

Event	Gold		Silver		Bronze	
Aerials	Oleksandr Abramenko; Ukraine	128.51	Jia Zongyang; China	128.05	Ilya Burov; Olympic Athletes from Russia	122.17
Halfpipe	David Wise; United States	97.20	Alex Ferreira; United States	96.40	Nico Porteous; New Zealand	94.80
Moguls	Mikaël Kingsbury; Canada	86.63	Matt Graham; Australia	82.57	Daichi Hara; Japan	82.19
Ski cross	Brady Leman; Canada		Marc Bischofberger; Switzerland		Sergey Ridzik; Olympic Athletes from Russia	
Slopestyle	Øystein Bråten; Norway	95.00	Nick Goepper; United States	93.60	Alex Beaulieu-Marchand; Canada	92.40

=== Women's events ===
Event	Gold		Silver		Bronze	
Aerials	Hanna Huskova; Belarus	96.14	Zhang Xin; China	95.52	Kong Fanyu; China	70.14
Halfpipe	Cassie Sharpe; Canada	95.80	Marie Martinod; France	92.60	Brita Sigourney; United States	91.60
Moguls	Perrine Laffont; France	78.65	Justine Dufour-Lapointe; Canada	78.56	Yuliya Galysheva; Kazakhstan	77.40
Ski cross	Kelsey Serwa; Canada		Brittany Phelan; Canada		Fanny Smith; Switzerland	
Slopestyle	Sarah Höfflin; Switzerland	91.20	Mathilde Gremaud; Switzerland	88.00	Isabel Atkin; Great Britain	84.60

== Participating nations ==
A total of 268 athletes from 27 nations (including the IOC's designation of Olympic Athletes from Russia) were scheduled to participate (the numbers of athletes are shown in parentheses).

- Australia (16)
- Austria (12)
- Belarus (6)
- Canada (30)
- Chile (2)
- China (15)
- Czech Republic (1)
- Denmark (1)
- Finland (3)
- France (19)
- Germany (8)
- Great Britain (11)
- Hungary (1)
- Ireland (1)
- Italy (4)
- Japan (11)
- Kazakhstan (9)
- Mexico (1)
- New Zealand (9)
- Norway (8)
- Olympic Athletes from Russia (22)
- Slovenia (1)
- South Korea (9)
- Sweden (14)
- Switzerland (22)
- Ukraine (3)
- United States (29)
