= Brendan McKay =

Brendan McKay or Mackay may refer to:

- Brendan McKay (mathematician) (born 1951), Australian academic and author
- Brendan McKay (baseball) (born 1995), American pitcher and designated hitter
- Brendan Mackay (born 1997), Canadian freestyle skier
