= Michael Riddle =

Michael Riddle may refer to:

- Mike Riddle (born 1986), skier
- Michael Riddle (programmer), inventor of the Interact computer software
