= Gustav Legnavsky =

New Zealand freestyle skier

Personal information
- Born: 23 September 2005 (age 20) Dunedin, New Zealand
- Height: 1.83 m (6 ft 0 in)

Sport
- Country: New Zealand
- Sport: Freestyle skiing
- Event: Halfpipe
- Coached by: Pete Legnavsky

Gustav Legnavsky (born 23 September 2005) is a New Zealand freestyle skier who specialises in halfpipe. He represented New Zealand at the 2022 and 2026 Winter Olympics.

== Biography ==
Legnavsky was born in Dunedin on 23 September 2005, the son of Pete and Bridget Legnavsky. His father competed in mogul skiing in FIS Freestyle Ski World Cup events between 1990 and 1993, and represented Slovakia at the 1993 FIS Freestyle World Ski Championships, finishing 50th in the men's moguls. Gustav Legnavsky began skiing as an infant. He was educated at Mount Aspiring College in Wānaka.

Legnavsky competed in the halfpipe at the FIS Freestyle Junior World Ski Championships in 2019. The youngest competitor in the field, he finished in 14th place. In March 2021, he finished 16th in the men's halfpipe at the 2021 FIS Freestyle Ski World Championships in Aspen. He made his FIS Freestyle Ski World Cup debut a week later, with a 27th placing at Aspen. His best result in the Freestyle Ski World Cup 2021–2022 season was eighth in the halfpipe at Mammoth Mountain in January 2022.

Representing New Zealand in the men's halfpipe at the 2022 Winter Olympics, Legnavsky was 19th in qualifying, and did not progress to the final.

Awards
Preceded by Erika Fairweather	Halberg Awards; Emerging Talent Award; 2022	Succeeded by Julian David
