= Anja Barugh =

Irish-New Zealand freestyle skier (born 1999)

Personal information
- Full name: Anja Niamh Barugh
- Born: 21 May 1999 (age 26); Morrinsville, New Zealand
- Height: 1.63 m (5 ft 4 in)

Sport
- Country: Ireland/New Zealand
- Sport: Freestyle skiing
- Event: Halfpipe
- Coached by: Rex Thomas

Anja Niamh Barugh (born 21 May 1999) is an Irish-New Zealand freestyle skier who specialises in halfpipe. She represented New Zealand at the 2022 Winter Olympics in Beijing, where she ranked 19th.

== Biography ==
Barugh was born in Morrinsville on 21 May 1999, the daughter of Kevin and Kerry-Lea Barugh.She moved from Pukehina to Wānaka in 2017 where she started skiing Halfpipe.

Barugh made her FIS Freestyle Ski World Cup debut in the 2018–2019 season, finishing with a World Cup ranking of 21st in halfpipe. In the following three seasons, she ranked 30th, 20th, and 27th, respectively. She competed in the freeski halfpipe at the 2021 World Championships, placing 15th.

Barugh is currently a full-time university student while competing internationally in freestyle skiing. In addition to her athletic career, she has worked with St John Ambulance and pursues photography, often documenting her training and travel experiences.
