= Jon Sallinen =

Finnish freestyle skier

Personal information
- Born: 13 November 2000 (age 25) Helsinki, Finland

Sport
- Country: Finland
- Sport: Freestyle skiing
- Event: Halfpipe
Medal record
Men's freestyle skiing
Representing Finland
World Championships
Silver medal – second place	2023 Bakuriani	Halfpipe
Winter X Games
Bronze medal – third place	2023 Aspen	SuperPipe

Jon Sallinen (born 13 November 2000) is a Finnish freestyle skier who competed in the 2022 Winter Olympics in Beijing, China in the men's halfpipe event and finished 23rd.

== Career ==
Sallinen was unable to advance in the 2022 Winter Olympics men's halfpipe qualifying round, finishing in last place.

During his attempt to qualify, Sallinen crashed into an unidentified cameraman. Both Sallinen and the cameraman avoided serious injury. Sallinen subsequently apologized, stating "I hope the camera guy is all good, sorry."
