= Brendan Newby =

Irish freestyle skier

Personal information
- Born: 9 September 1996 (age 29) Cork, Ireland
- Occupation: skiing coach
- Years active: 2009–present
- Employer(s): Park City Ski & Snowboard - Freeski Resort
- Height: 185 cm (6 ft 1 in)
- Weight: 172 lb (78 kg)

Sport
- Country: Ireland
- Sport: Freestyle skiing
- Event: Half-pipe
- Club: Team Park City United

Achievements and titles
- Olympic finals: 2018, 2022

Brendan "Bubba" Newby (born 9 September 1996) is an Irish-born freestyle skier who represents Ireland in the half-pipe event.

Born in Cork to American parents, he attended Mountain View High School, Utah and competed at Park City, Utah.

Newby competed for Ireland at the 2018 Winter Olympics in Pyeongchang, South Korea and the 2022 Winter Olympics in Beijing, China. He also competed for Ireland at the men's ski halfpipe event at the FIS Freestyle Ski and Snowboarding World Championships 2021 in Aspen, Colorado.

== See also ==
- Ireland at the Winter Olympics
