= Birk Irving =

American freestyle skier (born 1999)

Personal information
- Born: July 26, 1999 (age 26) Englewood, Colorado, United States
- Height: 5 ft 9 in (175 cm)
- Weight: 150 lb (68 kg)

Sport
- Country: United States
- Sport: Freestyle skiing
- Event: Halfpipe
- Club: Winter Park Competition Center
Medal record
Men's freestyle skiing
Representing the United States
World Championships
Bronze medal – third place	2021 Aspen	Halfpipe
Winter X Games
Silver medal – second place	2023 Aspen	SuperPipe
Bronze medal – third place	2021 Aspen	Superpipe
Winter Youth Olympics
Gold medal – first place	2016 Lillehammer	Halfpipe

Birk Irving (born July 26, 1999) is an American freestyle skier. He represented the United States at the 2022 and 2026 Winter Olympics.

== Career ==
He competed at the FIS Freestyle Ski and Snowboarding World Championships 2021, winning the bronze medal in the halfpipe event.

Irving competed in the 2022 Winter Olympics in the men's halfpipe where he finished 5th overall.

== Personal life ==
His younger sister, Svea, is also an Olympic freeski halfpipe skier. His grandfather, John Irving, is a bestselling novelist.
