= Alex Ferreira =

American freestyle skier (born 1994)

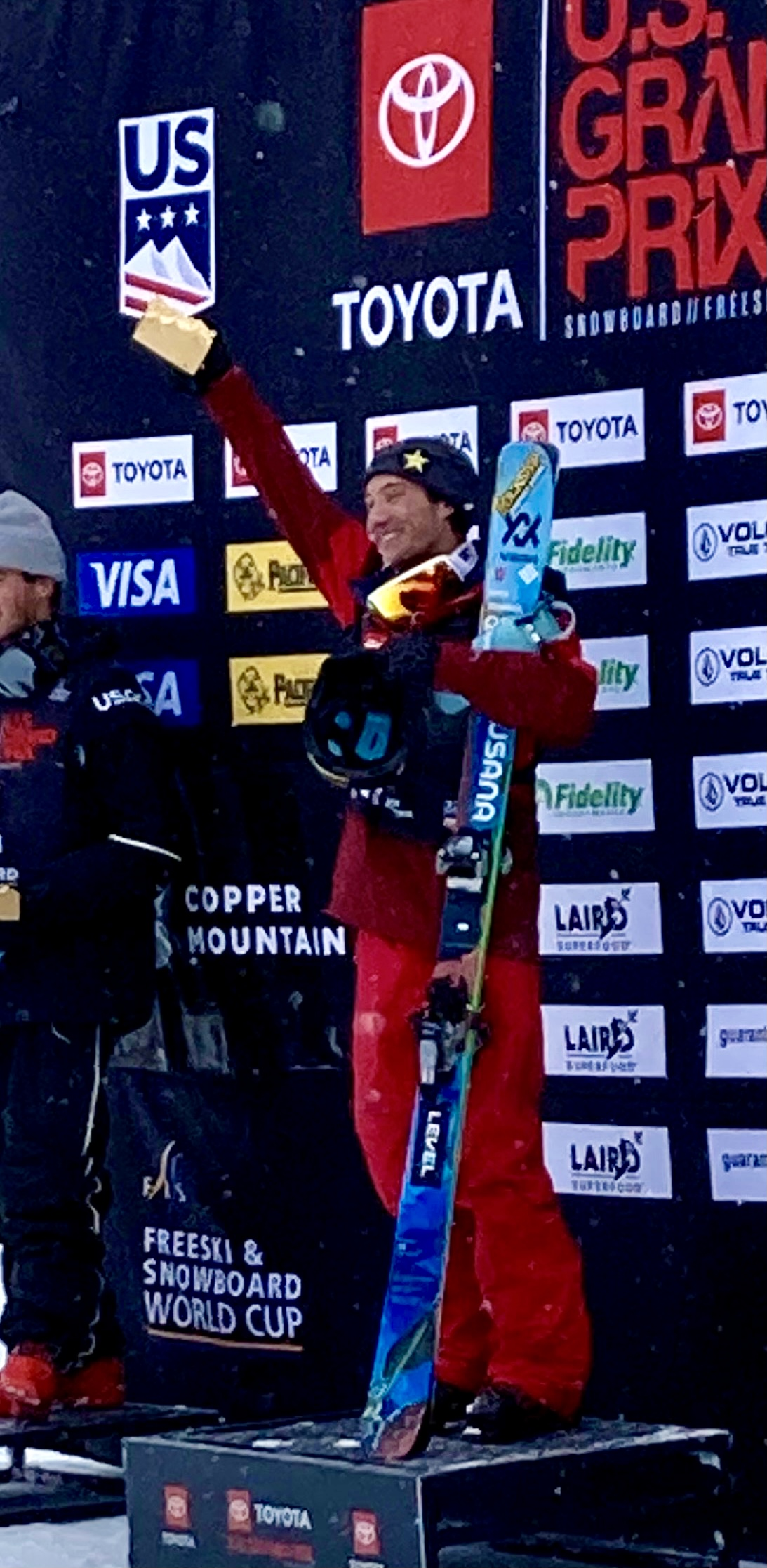

Personal information
- Born: August 14, 1994 (age 32) Aspen, Colorado, U.S.
- Home town: Aspen, Colorado, U.S.
- Education: Colorado Mountain College
- Height: 1.75 m (5 ft 9 in)
- Website: alexferreiraski.com

Sport
- Country: United States
- Sport: Freestyle skiing
- Event: Halfpipe
Medal record
Men's freestyle skiing
Representing the United States
Olympic Games
Gold medal – first place	2026 Milano Cortina	Halfpipe
Silver medal – second place	2018 Pyeongchang	Halfpipe
Bronze medal – third place	2022 Beijing	Halfpipe
World Championships
Bronze medal – third place	2023 Bakuriani	Halfpipe
Bronze medal – third place	2025 Engadin	Halfpipe
Winter X Games
Gold medal – first place	2019 Aspen	SuperPipe
Gold medal – first place	2020 Aspen	SuperPipe
Gold medal – first place	2024 Aspen	SuperPipe
Silver medal – second place	2016 Oslo	SuperPipe
Silver medal – second place	2018 Aspen	SuperPipe
Bronze medal – third place	2014 Aspen	SuperPipe
Bronze medal – third place	2015 Aspen	SuperPipe
World Cup
Gold medal – first place	2017 Cardrona, NZ	Halfpipe
Gold medal – first place	2017 Tignes, France	Halfpipe
Gold medal – first place	2021 Copper Mountain	Halfpipe
Gold medal – first place	2023 Beijing, China	Halfpipe
Gold medal – first place	2023 Copper Mountain	Halfpipe
Gold medal – first place	2023 Calgary	Halfpipe
Gold medal – first place	2024 Beijing, China	Halfpipe
Gold medal – first place	2024 Copper Mountain	Halfpipe
Gold medal – first place	2024 Calgary CAN	Halfpipe
Gold medal – first place	2024 Mammoth Mountain	Halfpipe
Silver medal – second place	2018 Tigne, France	Halfpipe
Silver medal – second place	2018 Mammoth Mountain	Halfpipe
Silver medal – second place	2018 Snowmass	Halfpipe
Silver medal – second place	2021 Calgary	Halfpipe
Silver medal – second place	2021 Calgary	Halfpipe
Dew Tour
Gold medal – first place	2017 Breckenridge	SuperPipe
Gold medal – first place	2018 Breckenridge	SuperPipe
Gold medal – first place	2021 Copper Mountain	SuperPipe
Gold medal – first place	2024 Copper Mountain	SuperPipe

Alex Ferreira (born August 14, 1994) is an American halfpipe skier. He received the gold medal in the men's halfpipe event at the 2026 Winter Olympics. He also competed previously in the 2018 and 2022 Olympic editions, winning silver and bronze, respectively. At the X Games, Ferreira achieved gold medals in the 2019 Winter X Games XXIII, 2020 Winter X Games XXIV, and 2024 Winter X Games XXVII, in Men's Ski Superpipe.

== Early life ==
Alex Ferreira was born in Aspen, Colorado. He grew up attending the Aspen school system, where the Aspen High School mascot is The Skiers. Between the ages of 8 and 18, Ferreira was part of the Aspen Valley Ski Club (AVSC), where he met fellow professional skier Torin Yater-Wallace, ski filmer Kyler Sciarrone, and toy designer Mikey Schumacher. At AVSC, Ferreira met some of his biggest ski influences and supporters: His current longtime coach, Elana "E" Chase, and Erik Knight.

Ferreira graduated from Colorado Mountain College in August 2021 with a Bachelor of Arts in Business Administration. His father, Marcelo, was a professional soccer player from Argentina. His mother, Colleen, was a New Jersey state-level relay racer who ran ten full marathon races and competed and medaled in the Penn Relays. Colleen is a graduate of West Virginia University and the proprietor of The Red Spa in Aspen. His parents met in nearby Vail and were soon married and moved to Aspen to raise their family. Alex has one sister, Lourdes.

== Competition career ==
Ferreira won his first major victory at the Gatorade Freelow Finals youth halfpipe competition hosted by Snowbasin Ski Resort, Utah on February 10–12, 2012. The win guaranteed Ferreira an invite to the Dew Tour professional competition in December 2013 at Breckenridge Mountain Resort, Colorado. Ferreira has won podium finishes in halfpipe events at competitions including X Games, Dew Tour, Whistler Ski Invitational, FIS World Cups, and the Olympic Games. In 2018, Ferreira won the silver halfpipe medal at the Pyeongchang Olympics in Korea, where he made history becoming the first halfpipe athlete in history to attempt and complete an "all doubles run", where a double is an acrobatic ski trick that consists of two flipping rotations within a single jump. After the 2018 competition season, Ferreira also won the FIS World Cup Overall, thus earning the FIS Crystal Globe for the Best Male Halfpipe Skier of the Year.

In the fall of 2021, Ferreira was training and competing to qualify for his second Olympic Games. The qualification period ended in January 2022 and consisted of five more competitions; World Cup at Copper Mountain, Dew Tour at Copper Mountain, two World Cups at the Canadian Olympic Park, and the final competition at Mammoth Mountain, California on January 10, 2022.

Breaking his "Copper Curse", Alex took first place at both the Grand Prix on December 10, 2021, with a 93.50 and the Dew Tour on December 18, 2021, with a 95.75.

On Saturday, January 8, 2022, Ferreira was named to the United States Winter Olympic Team at a ceremony held at Mammoth Mountain Resort in Mammoth Lakes, California. This is his second time being named to represent the United States at the Winter Olympics. Ferreira earned his spot by winning the Copper Grand Prix and Dew Tour at Copper Mountain in Colorado in December 2021. Additional back-to-back 2nd place finishes at the World Cups hosted by Canadian Olympic Park in Calgary, Alberta secured his invitation to the 2022 Beijing Olympics, where he won the bronze medal in the men's halfpipe event.

== Film projects ==
Alongside his professional halfpipe career, in 2018 Ferreira developed a film persona named Hotdog Hans with his good friend and filmmaker, Matt Hobbs. With the character of Hotdog Hans, Ferreira has produced six feature ski edits and many ski clips uploaded to Instagram and TikTok. Ferreira quickly gained a following on TikTok that peaked at 1 million followers. After a long visit to Japan, Ferreira also completed a ski film project in 2019. The completed project debuted on ESPN's The World of X Games in November 2019.

== World Cup titles ==
Season	
Season	Discipline
2017–18	Halfpipe
2023–24	Park & Pipe Overall, Halfpipe
2024–25	Halfpipe
