= Ben Harrington =

New Zealand freestyle skier

Personal information
- Full name: Benjamin Stephen Harrington
- Born: 13 October 2001 (age 24) Dunedin, New Zealand
- Height: 1.68 m (5 ft 6 in)

Sport
- Country: New Zealand
- Sport: Freestyle skiing
- Event: Halfpipe
- Coached by: Luca Harrington; Greg Harrington; Tom Wilmont

Benjamin Stephen Harrington (born 13 October 2001) is a New Zealand freestyle skier who specialises in halfpipe. He represented New Zealand at the 2022 and 2026 Winter Olympics.

== Biography ==
Harrington was born in Dunedin on 13 October 2001, the son of Greg Harrington and Nancy Stout. He is the older brother of Luca Harrington, who won a bronze medal in the boy's halfpipe at the 2020 Winter Youth Olympics. Ben Harrington began skiing when he was 18 months old, and rode his first halfpipe at the age of six. He was educated at Mount Aspiring College in Wānaka, and is now a business student at Massey University.

Harrington made his FIS Freestyle Ski World Cup debut in the 2016–2017 season, with a 36th placing at Copper Mountain in December 2016. In the 2017–2018 season, he was 51st in the World Cup halfpipe rankings. At the FIS Freestyle Junior World Ski Championships at Cardrona Alpine Resort in September 2018, he finished fourth in the halfpipe, before tearing his anterior cruciate ligament and medial collateral ligament. He returned to competition in late 2019, and competed in the freeski halfpipe at the 2021 World Championships, placing 15th.
