= Peter Speight =

Freestyle skier

Personal information
- Nationality: British
- Born: 26 December 1992 (age 33) Sheffield
- Height: 1.88 m (6 ft 2 in)

Sport
- Sport: Freestyle skiing
- Event: Halfpipe skiing

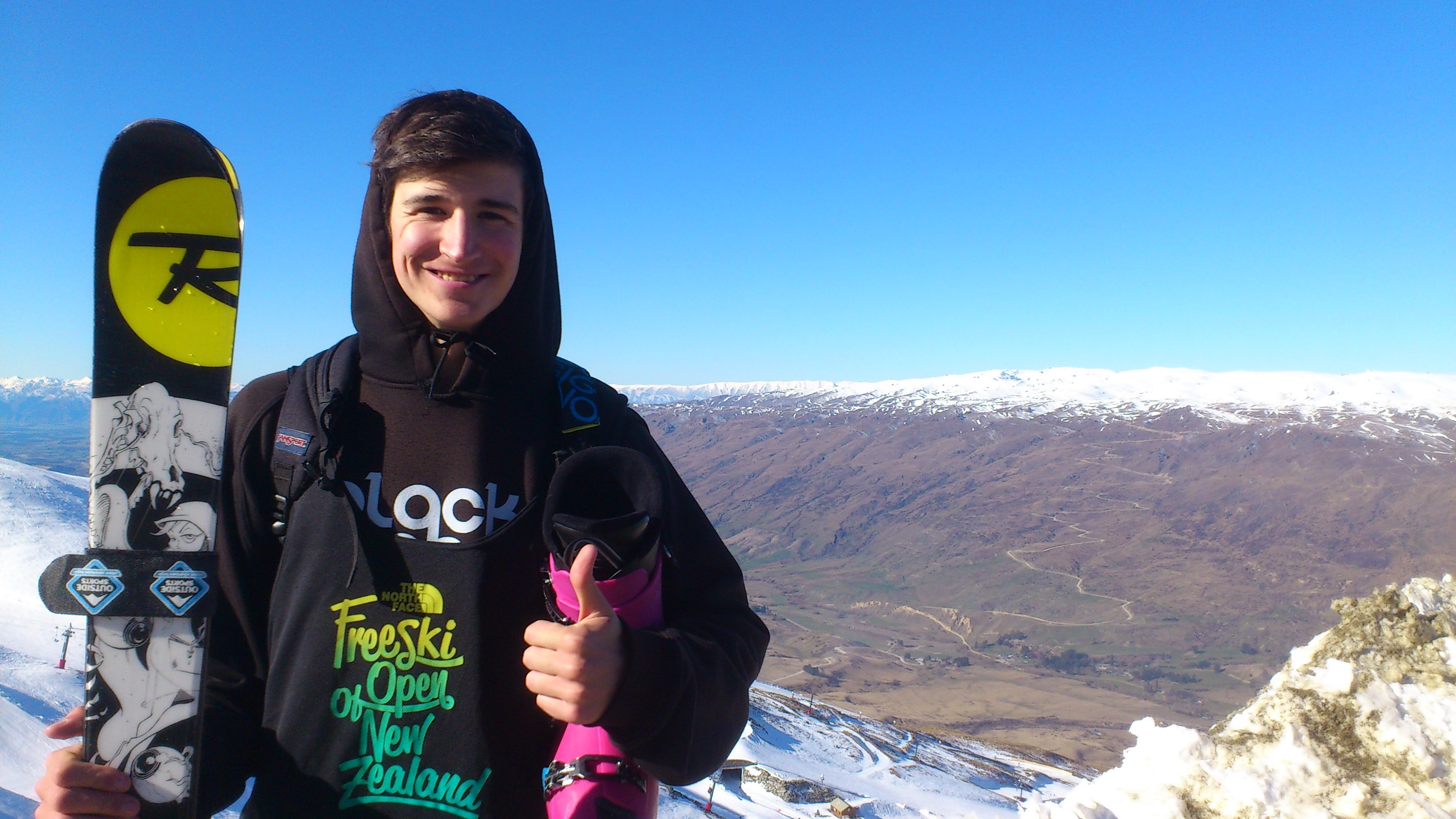

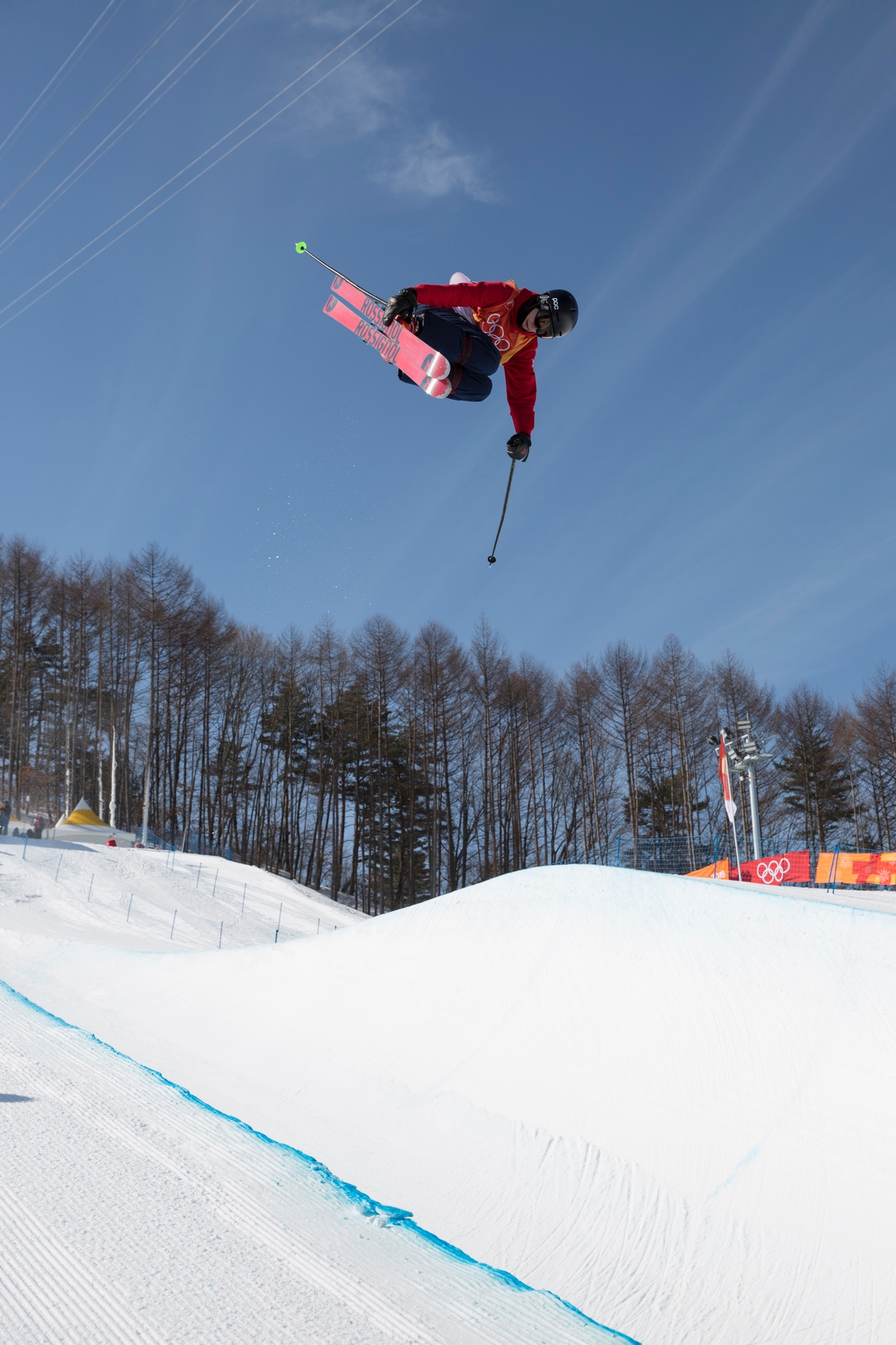

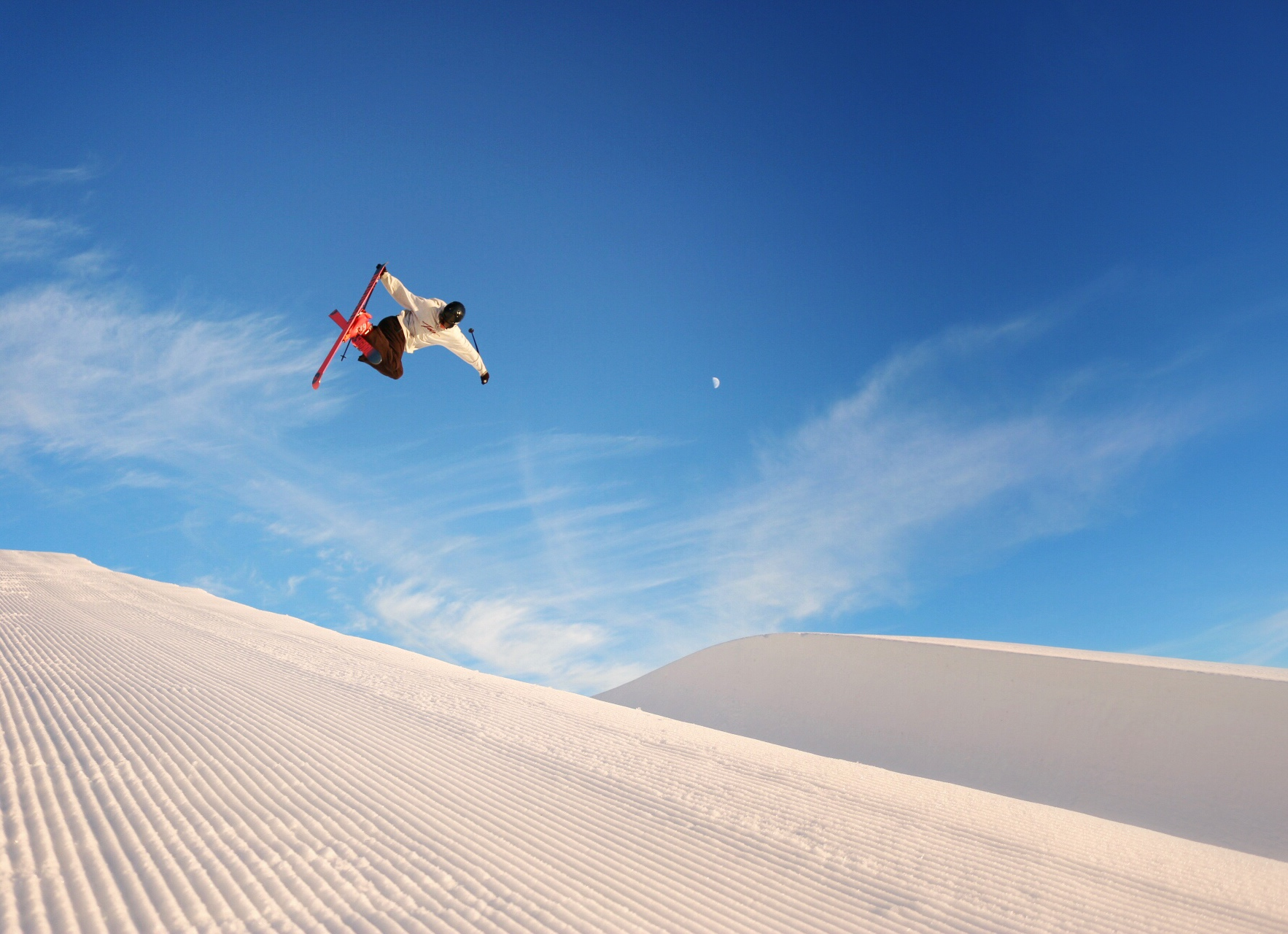

Peter Speight (born 26 December 1992) is a British freestyle skier. He competed in the 2018 Winter Olympics finishing 15th. Speight made his World Cup halfpipe debut in 2013 and achieved his career best World Cup finish with a 4th place in China, December 2017. He has won the British championships twice in 2016 and 2017.

Born in East London, Speight moved to Sheffield aged 10 where he first took up freestyle skiing when his father took him to try it out at the Sheffield Ski Village dry slope. Spending his teens competing and skiing around the UK dry slope scene, he progressed up to international level when he was 17, competing at the European Freeski Open in Laax, Switzerland. Speight continued with freestyle skiing into his 20s, heading abroad when he left school to ski and chase halfpipe competitions in Europe, the US and New Zealand. He reached the finals in the NZ Freeski Open and was selected for the British Halfpipe team and his debut World Championships in 2013. He is the first British man to land a Double Cork 1260 in a halfpipe.

Speight narrowly missed out on the 2014 Winter Olympics. He then went on to receive lottery funding from U.K Sport and qualified for the Olympics in South Korea in 2018. He finished the 2018 season ranked 15th in the world before retiring from competitions in 2019.

Speight also studied history at the University of Manchester. He received support through a sport scholarship and TASS funding, combining his sport and studies for 4 years before graduating in 2016.
