= Pavel Chupa =

Russian freestyle skier

Personal information
- Nationality: Russian
- Born: 20 September 1994 (age 31)
- Height: 1.86 m (6 ft 1 in)

Sport
- Sport: Freestyle skiing

Pavel Chupa (born 20 September 1994) is a Russian freestyle skier. He competed in the 2018 Winter Olympics.
