= Lee Kang-bok =

South Korean freestyle skier

Personal information
- Nationality: South Korean
- Born: 17 November 2000 (age 25)
- Height: 1.68 m (5 ft 6 in)

Sport
- Sport: Freestyle skiing

Lee Kang-bok (born 17 November 2000) is a South Korean freestyle skier. He competed in the 2018 Winter Olympics.
