= Kong Xiangrui =

Chinese freestyle skier (born 2001)

Personal information
- Nationality: Chinese
- Born: 18 January 2001 (age 25)
- Height: 1.72 m (5 ft 8 in)

Sport
- Sport: Freestyle skiing

Kong Xiangrui (Chinese: 孔祥芮; born 18 January 2001) is a Chinese freestyle skier. He competed in the 2018 Winter Olympics.
