= Aaron Blunck =

American freestyle skier

Personal information
- Born: April 12, 1996 (age 30) Englewood, Colorado, U.S.
- Height: 6'0 in
- Weight: 185 lb (84 kg)

Sport
- Country: United States
- Sport: Freestyle skiing
- Event: Halfpipe
- Club: Ski and Snowboard Club Vail
Medal record
Men's freestyle skiing
Representing the United States
World Championships
Gold medal – first place	2017 Sierra Nevada	Halfpipe
Gold medal – first place	2019 Utah	Halfpipe
Winter X Games
Gold medal – first place	2017 Aspen	SuperPipe
Silver medal – second place	2020 Aspen	SuperPipe
Silver medal – second place	2021 Aspen	SuperPipe
Silver medal – second place	2022 Aspen	SuperPipe
New Zealand Winter Games
Silver medal – second place	2013 Cardrona	Halfpipe
Winter Youth Olympic Games
Bronze medal – third place	2012 Innsbruck	Halfpipe

Aaron Blunck (born April 12, 1996) is an American freestyle skier from Crested Butte, Colorado.

== Career ==
Blunck competed in the men's halfpipe event at the 2014 Winter Olympics in Sochi, Russia. He qualified for the final, where he placed seventh out of 12 competitors.

Blunck won the gold medal at the 2017 Winter X Games in Aspen in the men's superpipe.

During the summer, Blunck can be found at Mt. Hood, Oregon, where he hosts a Takeover Session at Windells Camp.

== Allegations against Twitter and Western media ==
According to the South China Morning Post, Blunck alleged that he was suspended by Twitter after he praised the 2022 Beijing Olympics. He reposted a fan's comment that read: "Aaron Blunck [is] out here telling the truth and getting punished by his own government." He later also shared a commentator's tweet accusing the US government of causing his account to be shut down: "Twitter has executed the order of the Western ruling cabals... Punishment comes pretty fast." In his Instagram post, he tagged Twitter and asked: "What'd I do?"

Prior to his allegation, he had criticized Western media's negative coverage of the event, saying, "I didn't really know what to expect, being stateside you've kind of heard some pretty bad media, and that is completely false – it's actually been phenomenal", adding that "Everybody – from staff to Covid testers, to accommodation – it's probably, honestly, one of the better Olympics that we've been to".

However, it was revealed that the account had been suspended in September of the previous year, over five months prior to the games. Twitter responded to the allegations saying that the account had been suspended in error and had since been recovered.
