= Nico Porteous =

New Zealand freestyle skier

Nico Porteous MNZM
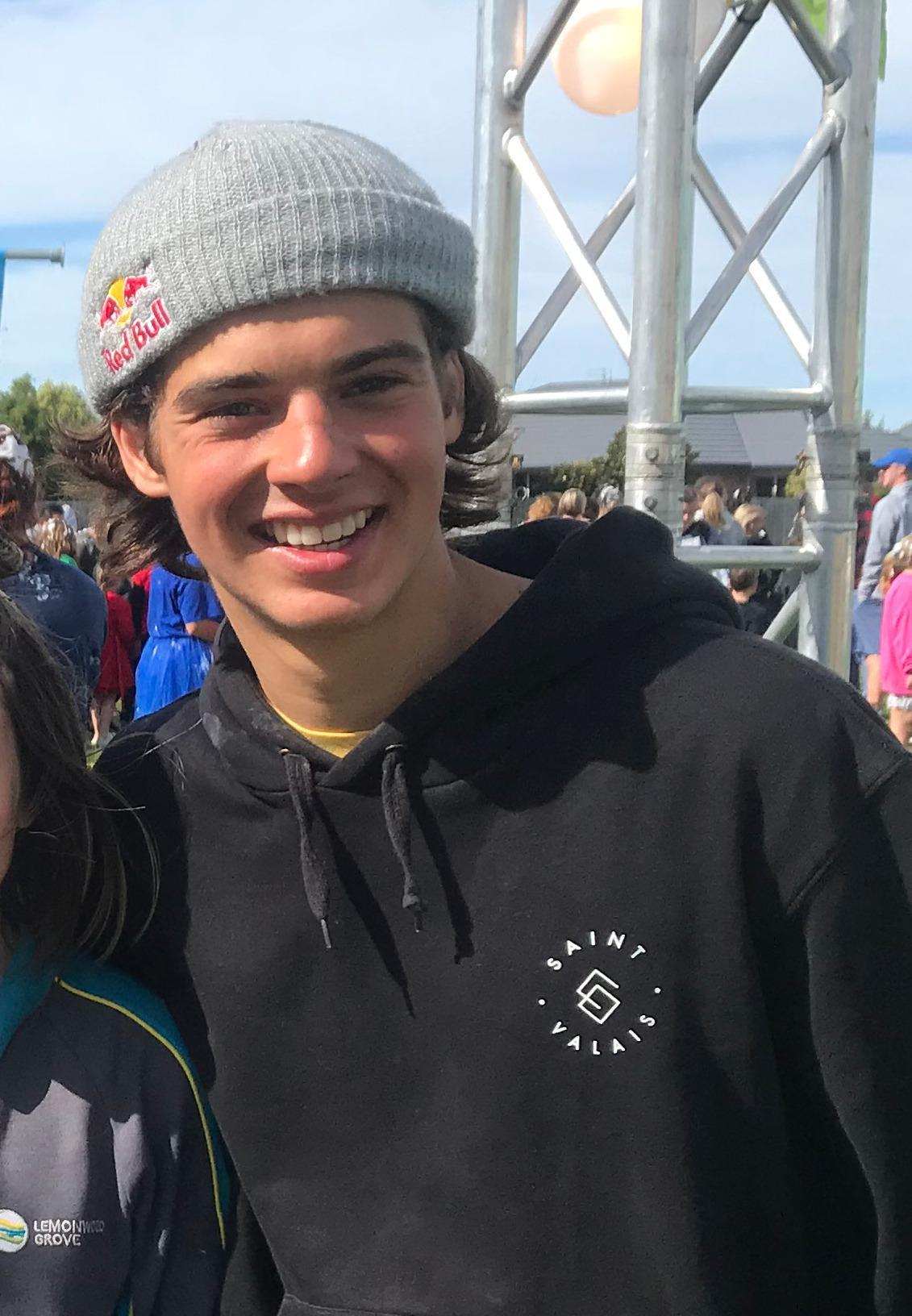
- Porteous on the set of What Now in Rolleston, 2019

Personal information
- Born: 23 November 2001 (age 24) Hamilton, New Zealand
- Height: 1.75 m (5 ft 9 in)
- Weight: 63 kg (139 lb)
- Relative: Miguel Porteous (brother)

Sport
- Country: New Zealand
- Sport: Freestyle skiing
- Event: Halfpipe
Medal record
Men's freestyle skiing
Representing New Zealand
Winter Olympics
Gold medal – first place	2022 Beijing	Halfpipe
Bronze medal – third place	2018 Pyeongchang	Halfpipe
World Championships
Gold medal – first place	2021 Aspen	Halfpipe
Winter X Games
Gold medal – first place	2021 Aspen	Superpipe
Gold medal – first place	2022 Aspen	Superpipe
Bronze medal – third place	2019 Aspen	Superpipe
Winter Dew Tour
Bronze medal – third place	Copper 2020	Modified superpipe

Nico Porteous MNZM (born 23 November 2001) is a New Zealand freestyle skier and an Olympic champion. He is New Zealand's youngest Olympic Games medallist, having won a bronze medal at the 2018 Winter Olympics at the age of 16. He became New Zealand's second Winter Olympic gold medallist, and first male, with his win in men's halfpipe at the Beijing 2022 Winter Olympics.

== Early life and family ==
Porteous was introduced to skiing by his parents and learned to ski in France when he was three years old. He has had a professional coach since he was six years old. Porteous has been home-schooled through Te Aho o Te Kura Pounamu, as well as studying at Christ Church Grammar School in Perth, Western Australia. His older brother Miguel Porteous is also a freeskier and Olympian, having competed at the 2018 Winter Olympics and the 2022 Winter Olympics.

== Career ==
When Porteous was 14, he became the youngest person in the world to land the triple cork 1440 (upside down three times, and four full spins). This has since been beaten by another skier.

Porteous was selected to compete at the 2018 Winter Olympics, making him the second-youngest Winter Olympian in the nation's history (behind Alice Robinson). In the men's halfpipe he won the bronze medal, becoming only the third New Zealander (and first male New Zealander) to win a medal at a Winter Olympics. At age 16 years 91 days, Porteous became New Zealand's youngest Olympic Games medallist, breaking the previous record of 16 years and 353 days set by Zoi Sadowski-Synnott earlier the same day, who had in turn broken the record of 17 years 100 days set by Danyon Loader at the 1992 Summer Olympics.

His best 2017–18 FIS Freestyle Ski World Cup finish is 6th at Cardrona Alpine Resort.

In 2019, Porteous claimed the bronze medal in the superpipe event at the Winter X Games in Aspen, Colorado.

At the 2019 Audi Nines Porteous performed a Switch Alley Oop Double Misty 1080.

In 2021, Porteous claimed his first X Games gold medal in the Superpipe event. In January 2022, Porteous won a gold medal in the freeski halfpipe event at the U.S. Grand Prix World Cup event in California, USA. During the 2022 X Games in Aspen, USA, Porteous defended his title by winning gold in superpipe on the final run of the competition.

On 19 February 2022, Porteous won the gold medal in the men's halfpipe event at the Beijing 2022 Winter Olympics. In the 2023 New Year Honours, he was appointed a Member of the New Zealand Order of Merit, for services to snow sports.

In 2025, he retired from competitions.

Awards
Preceded by Kane Williamson	New Zealand's Sportsman of the Year; 2022	Succeeded by Aaron Gate
