= Kevin Rolland =

French freestyle skier (born 1989)

Kévin Rolland
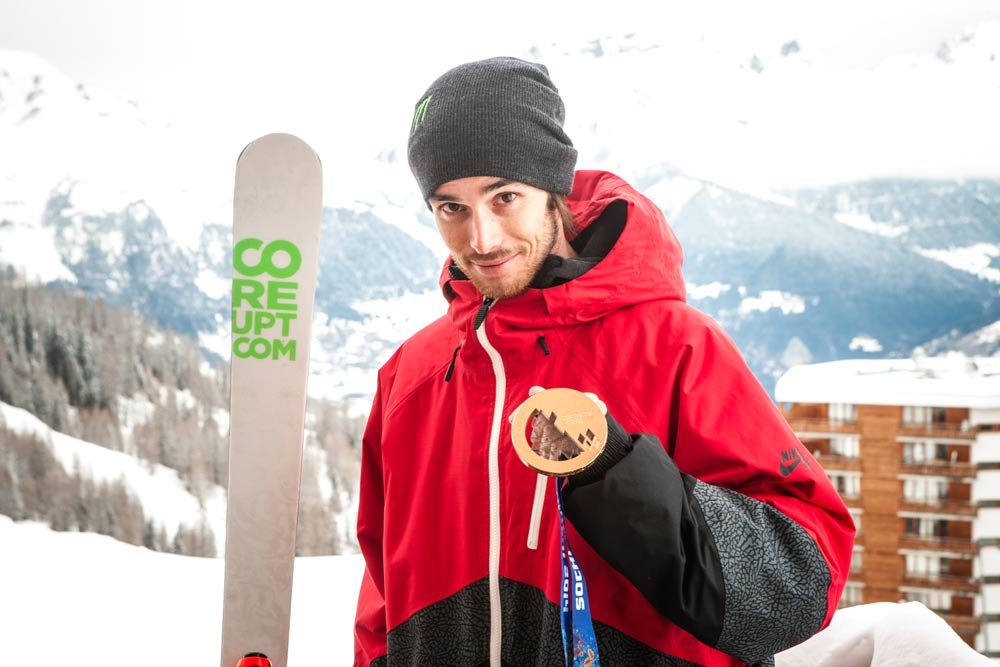
- Rolland in 2014

Personal information
- Nationality: French
- Born: 10 August 1989 (age 37) Bourg-Saint-Maurice, France
- Height: 1.78 m (5 ft 10 in)
- Weight: 65 kg (143 lb)

Sport
- Country: France
- Sport: freestyle skiing
- Event: Halfpipe
- Club: C.S. La Plagne
Medal record
Men's Freestyle skiing
Representing France
Olympic Games
Bronze medal – third place	2014 Sochi	Halfpipe
World Championships
Gold medal – first place	2009 Inawashiro	Halfpipe
Silver medal – second place	2011 Deer Valley	Halfpipe
Silver medal – second place	2019 Utah	Halfpipe
Bronze medal – third place	2017 Sierra Nevada	Halfpipe
Winter X Games
Gold medal – first place	2010 Aspen	SuperPipe
Gold medal – first place	2010 Tignes	SuperPipe
Gold medal – first place	2011 Aspen	SuperPipe
Gold medal – first place	2011 Tignes	SuperPipe
Gold medal – first place	2016 Aspen	SuperPipe
Silver medal – second place	2014 Aspen	SuperPipe
Silver medal – second place	2015 Aspen	SuperPipe
Bronze medal – third place	2010 Aspen	SuperPipe High Air

Kévin Rolland (born 10 August 1989) is a French freestyle skier. He won the gold medal at the 2009 FIS Freestyle World Ski Championships in the halfpipe. He lost his title in 2011 to the Canadian Mike Riddle but still finished on the podium at the second place.

Rolland has also won seven medals at the Winter X Games and two medals at the Winter X Games Europe, including back-to-back golds in the SuperPipe at both events. Rolland also became the overall Winter Dew Tour Superpipe Champion in 2011.

During the development of the open world extreme sports video game Steep, several professional skiers, including Kevin Rolland and extreme sports athletes and experts were consulted by the developing team.

Although hospitalised by a fall in 2019 which left him with head trauma, multiple contusions to his liver, kidneys, and lungs, and fractured his ribs and pelvis, Rolland made a comeback at the 2022 Winter Olympics in Beijing.

== Personal life ==
Kevin Rolland is the cousin of French freestyle skier Tess Ledeux (2001 - ).

Olympic Games
Preceded by Martin Fourcade	Flagbearer for France (with Tessa Worley); Beijing 2022	Succeeded by Incumbent
