= Mao Bingqiang =

Chinese freestyle skier (born 2001)

Personal information
- Nationality: Chinese
- Born: 19 July 2001 (age 24) Harbin, China
- Height: 1.60 m (5 ft 3 in)

Sport
- Sport: Freestyle skiing

Mao Bingqiang (Chinese: 毛秉强; born 19 July 2001) is a Chinese freestyle skier in the freeski halfpipe event. He competed in the 2018 Winter Olympics and the 2022 Winter Olympics.
