= Mike Riddle =

Canadian freestyle skier

Personal information
- Born: June 17, 1986 (age 40) Sherwood Park, Alberta, Canada
- Height: 6 ft 0 in (183 cm)
- Weight: 180 lb (82 kg)

Sport
- Country: Canada
Medal record
Men's Freestyle skiing
Representing Canada
Olympic Games
Silver medal – second place	2014 Sochi	Halfpipe
World Championships
Gold medal – first place	2011 Deer Valley	Halfpipe
Silver medal – second place	2017 Sierra Nevada	Halfpipe

Mike Riddle (born June 17, 1986) is a Canadian freestyle skier. He won the gold medal in the halfpipe at the 2011 FIS Freestyle World Ski Championships. He also won silver at the Sochi 2014 Olympics.
