= Noah Bowman =

Canadian freestyle skier (born 1992)

Personal information
- Nationality: Canadian
- Born: 8 May 1992 (age 34) Calgary, Alberta
- Height: 1.78 m (5 ft 10 in)
- Weight: 69 kg (152 lb)

Sport
- Country: Canada
- Sport: Freestyle skiing
- Event: Halfpipe
Medal record
Men's freestyle skiing
Representing Canada
World Championships
Bronze medal – third place	2019 Utah	Halfpipe
Winter X Games
Silver medal – second place	2012 Aspen	SuperPipe
Bronze medal – third place	2017 Aspen	SuperPipe
Winter Dew Tour
Gold medal – first place	Copper 2020	Modified Superpipe

Noah Bowman (born May 8, 1992) is a Canadian freestyle skier. He won the silver medal in Men's Ski SuperPipe at Winter X Games XVI. In 2017, he won the bronze medal in Men's Ski SuperPipe at Winter X Games XXI. Through 2024, he has 13 FIS Freestyle Ski World Cup podium finishes, 2 of which are victories. Other notable podiums include a bronze medal in Halfpipe at the FIS Freestyle Ski and Snowboarding World Championships 2019 and a gold medal in Modified Super at the 2020 Winter Dew Tour at Copper Mountain, Colorado.

Bowman represented Canada in the 2014 and 2018 Winter Olympic Games. On January 24, 2022, Bowman was named to Canada's 2022 Olympic team for his third Olympics appearance. Though he has not medaled, he has consistently performed at a high level, finishing in 5th, 5th, and 4th place, respectively.
