= Rafael Kreienbühl =

Swiss freestyle skier

Raffi K
Personal information
- Full name: Rafael Kreienbühl
- Nationality: Swiss
- Born: 10 June 1999 (age 26) Davos
- Height: 1.71 m (5 ft 7 in)
- Weight: 72 kg (159 lb)

Sport
- Sport: Freestyle skiing
- Club: Stützpunkt Davos Swiss Freeski Team

Rafael Kreienbühl (born 10 June 1999) is a Swiss freestyle skier. He competed in the 2018 Winter Olympics.
