= Brendan Mackay =

Canadian freestyle skier

Personal information
- Born: 7 June 1997 (age 29) Calgary, Alberta, Canada

Sport
- Country: Canada
- Sport: Freestyle skiing
- Event: Half-pipe
Medal record
Men's freestyle skiing
Representing Canada
Olympic Games
Bronze medal – third place	2026 Milano Cortina	Halfpipe
World Championships
Gold medal – first place	2023 Bakuriani	Halfpipe
Winter X Games
Bronze medal – third place	2020 Aspen	SuperPipe

Brendan Mackay (born 7 June 1997) is a Canadian freestyle skier who competes internationally in the half-pipe discipline. At the 2026 Winter Olympics, he won a bronze medal in halfpipe. He won the gold medal in the event at the 2023 freestyle skiing world championships.

== Career ==
Mackay has been part of the national team since 2015.

During the 2021–22 World Cup Season, Mackay won medals in all three events: bronze in Copper Mountain followed by back-to-back gold medals in Calgary, leading him to finish first in the overall halfpipe standings.

On January 24, 2022, Mackay was named to Canada's 2022 Olympic team in the halfpipe event.

In 2023 he won the men's half-pipe gold medal at the freestyle skiing world championships in Bakuriani, Georgia.
