= Robin Briguet =

Swiss freestyle skier

Personal information
- Nationality: Swiss
- Born: 11 May 1999 (age 26) Lens, Switzerland
- Height: 1.67 m (5 ft 6 in)

Sport
- Sport: Freestyle skiing

Robin Briguet (born 11 May 1999) is a Swiss freestyle skier. He competed in the 2018, 2022, and 2026 Winter Olympics.
