= Simon d'Artois =

Canadian freestyle skier

Personal information
- Born: January 26, 1992 (age 34) Whistler, British Columbia, Canada
- Weight: 1.80 m
- Website: 83 kg

Sport
- Country: Canada
- Sport: Freestyle skiing
- Event: Halfpipe
Medal record
Men's freestyle skiing
Representing Canada
World Championships
Silver medal – second place	2021 Aspen	Halfpipe
Winter X Games
Gold medal – first place	2015 Aspen	SuperPipe

Simon d'Artois (born January 26, 1992) is a Canadian freestyle skier. Born and raised in Whistler, BC. He is a member of the Canadian National Halfpipe team. d'Artois competed at the Winter X Games XIX, obtaining the first Canadian gold in the Men's SuperPipe. He has also competed at the U.S. Grand Prix, where in 2013 he fell and hit his head and shoulders near the end of his Superpipe jump.

d’Artois was ranked number 1 for the 2018/2019 world cup halfpipe season, securing him the crystal globe.

In March 2021, d’Artois achieved a silver medal at the World Championships and, in December 2021, a bronze medal at the Calgary Snow Rodeo. In January 2022, d'Artois was named to Canada's 2022 Olympic team.
