= David Wise (freestyle skier) =

American freestyle skier (born 1990)

Personal information
- Full name: David Wise
- Nationality: United States
- Born: June 30, 1990 (age 36) Reno, Nevada, U.S.
- Height: 6 ft 0 in (183 cm)

Sport
- Sport: Skiing

World Cup career
- Seasons: winter
- Indiv. wins: gold

Achievements and titles
- Personal best: Gold medals
Medal record
Men's freestyle skiing
Representing the United States
Olympic Games
Gold medal – first place	2014 Sochi	Halfpipe
Gold medal – first place	2018 Pyeongchang	Halfpipe
Silver medal – second place	2022 Beijing	Halfpipe
World Championships
Gold medal – first place	2013 Voss	Halfpipe
Winter X Games
Gold medal – first place	2012 Aspen	SuperPipe
Gold medal – first place	2013 Aspen	SuperPipe
Gold medal – first place	2014 Aspen	SuperPipe
Gold medal – first place	2018 Aspen	SuperPipe
Gold medal – first place	2023 Aspen	SuperPipe
Silver medal – second place	2013 Tignes	SuperPipe
Silver medal – second place	2019 Aspen	SuperPipe
- Updated on 3 May 2019

David Wise (born June 30, 1990) is an American freestyle skier. He is a two-time Olympic gold medalist (2014, 2018) and a five-time X Games Gold Medalist (2012, 2013, 2014, 2018, 2023). In 2014, Wise won his third consecutive gold medal at Winter X Games XVIII in Aspen, Colorado, before heading to Sochi for the 2014 Winter Olympics. There, he became the first Olympic gold medalist in the Men's Freeski Halfpipe, which debuted in the Winter Games that year. In 2018, after struggling both personally and professionally since his win in Sochi, Wise won his fourth gold medal at the X Games just before he left for PyeongChang to defend his Olympic title. After a sub-par qualifying competition that placed him in the fifth drop-in position for the finals, Wise failed to complete each of his first two runs due, in both cases, to a binding malfunction. On his third and final run, Wise completed a career-best run to take the gold medal, the second Olympic gold medal of his career, with a score of 97.20. David Wise is still competing at age 34, recently winning bronze, behind Nick Goepper and Alex Ferreira in the first ever podium sweep by 30 year olds at a halfpipe world cup event.

== Personal life ==
Wise grew up in Reno, Nevada. He started skiing at age three, learning at Sky Tavern just outside of Reno. He grew up skiing with his two sisters, Christy and Jessica, and his father, Thomas. In 2011, Wise joined his first freestyle ski team. In the early years, he also competed in moguls, aerials, big air, and slopestyle under the direction of Clay Beck but eventually gravitated to the halfpipe, one of many "new school" events he watched on TV at the X Games.

In 2011, he married his girlfriend, Alexandra. The couple has two children: a daughter, Nayeli, and a son, Malachi.

Wise is a Christian. He has said, "Skiing for me has always been my act of worship to God, and as long it continues to be, I will keep on skiing. I don’t treat my sport as something that’s meant to glorify me; I try my best to treat it as something that brings glory to God."
