= Half-pipe skiing =

Sport of riding snow skis on a half-pipe

Spinning in Superpipe
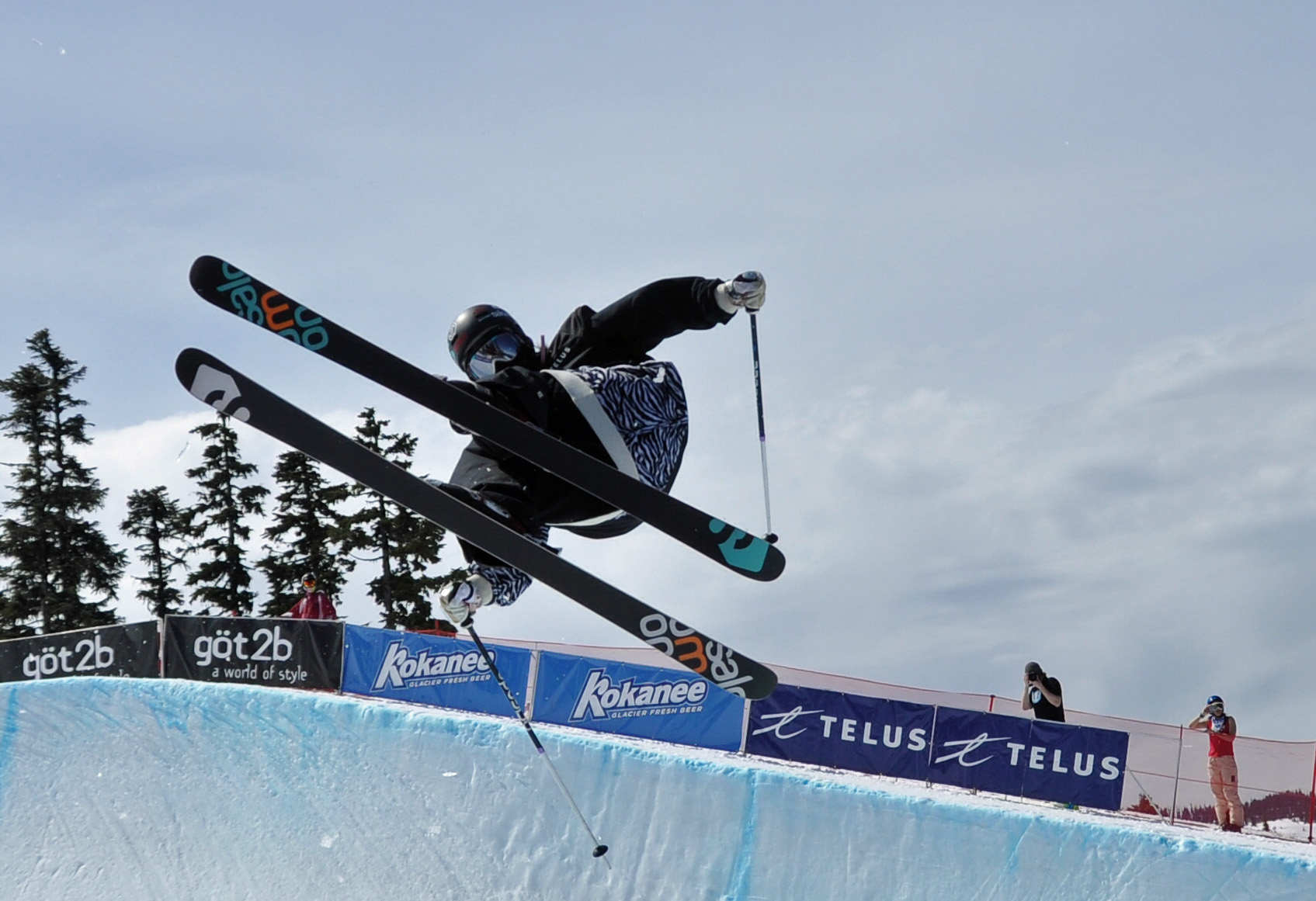
- Half-pipe skiing at the World Skiing Invitational
- Highest governing body: International Ski Federation

Presence
- Olympic: Since 2014

Half-pipe skiing is the sport of riding snow skis on a half-pipe. Competitors perform a series of tricks while going down the pipe. The current world record for highest jump in a half-pipe is held by Joffrey Pollet-Villard, with 26 feet 3 inches (8.00 metres). The sport is considered to be dangerous compared to other sports, and helmets are required to be worn during competitions. Half-pipe skiing has been part of the Winter X Games since 2002, and made its Olympic debut at the 2014 Winter Olympics in Sochi, Russia. David Wise of the United States of America became the first Olympic champion in this discipline with a total of 92.00 points.

== Origins of the snow half-pipe ==
In the early days of snowboarding, ski resorts were very reluctant to allow snowboarders on the mountain. Two Lake Tahoe locals, Bob Klein and Mark Anolik, were hiking around Tahoe City in 1979, looking for places to practice snowboarding as all resorts in the area still didn't allow snowboarding. They found land owned by the Tahoe-Truckee Sanitation Company and started using its natural half-pipe. News of the half-pipe quickly spread throughout the Lake Tahoe community and the spot became a popular destination for snowboard and enthusiasts. It was known in the area as the Tahoe City Pipe. The spot also became popular for skateboarders.

Four years after the discovery of the world's first half-pipe, Tom Sims organized the first World Championships at Soda Springs, California where the first man-made half-pipe was constructed. The first half-pipe championships experienced difficulties constructing a perfect half-pipe, as it had never been done before. Eventually, Sims moved it toward the bottom of the resort to make it less steep and more rideable for snowboarders controlling their speed. In 1986, the World Championship moved to Breckenridge, Colorado. Again, they were met with trouble constructing the half-pipe, as the employees in Breckenridge had never constructed and few had ever seen a half-pipe. After the competition the half-pipe remained for use, becoming the first permanent pipe at a resort and began spreading the awareness of half-pipes. By 1988, half-pipes had become media magnets. From all over the world, magazines, television shows, and newspapers wanted to do stories on snowboarders riding the half-pipe.

In 1991, Doug Waugh, a machinery mechanic came out with a machine, the Pipe Dragon, that could groom the slopes on a curve and was instrumental in making half-pipes constructible. The Pipe Dragon was used at all major resorts across Colorado and the West Coast and led to the mainstream culture of half-pipes. Now most major ski resorts in the nation and the world have a half-pipe at some part of the season, if not for the entire season. Many of these resorts also hold local competitions on these half-pipes. Though the half-pipe was mainly seen as a snowboarding activity it grew more popular among skiers as the X Games became more popular in the 2000s. In 2014, at the Winter Olympics in Sochi, Russia, the skiing half-pipe competition debuted.

== Competitions ==
Half-pipe skiing was formally endorsed by the International Ski Federation in June 2010, and was approved by the International Olympic Committee in April 2011 to be an official sport 2014 Olympic Games in Sochi, Krasnodar Krai, Russia. It has been a part of the Winter Dew Tour, the World Skiing Invitational, and the inaugural 2012 Winter Youth Olympics. The current world record for the highest half-pipe ski jump was set in 2015 and is held by Joffrey Pollet-Villard, with 26 feet and 3 inches (8.00 metres).

== Superpipe skiing ==
Superpipe skiing is an alternate form of half-pipe skiing that utilizes a superpipe (large halfpipe used in extreme sports) instead of a half-pipe. It has been a part of the Winter X Games since 2002. The 2012 Winter X Games champion was David Wise with a high score of 93.00.

== Safety concerns ==
Half-pipe skiing is considered to be a dangerous sport compared to other forms of skiing. In January 2012, Sarah Burke died due to injuries suffered during a training accident. Helmets are required during competition, and there are airbags on the sides of pipes during practice runs. Colorado governor Bill Owens signed a law that protected ski-resorts from injury-related lawsuits.

As the halfpipe in both skiing and snowboarding has become more popular, the tricks and maneuvers have become more complicated, leading to higher risk of injuries. In addition, improved technique, equipment, and training have enhanced the aerodynamics of the user's flying abilities. This has led to faster and higher elevation tricks, which have also increased the amount of injuries.

== See also ==
- Freestyle skiing at the Winter Olympics
- Winter X Games
- Freestyle skiing
- Aerial skiing
- Mogul skiing
- Ski ballet
- Ski cross
- Slopestyle
- List of skiing topics
- Vert skating
- Half-pipe
- Superpipe
- Alpine skiing
