= 2016 Summer Olympics ticket scandal =

Illegal ticket resale case

The 2016 Olympic Council of Ireland ticketing scandal was a major international sports controversy involving the illegal resale and price-gouging of corporate hospitality tickets allocated to the Olympic Council of Ireland (OCI) for the Summer Olympics in Rio de Janeiro. The investigation exposed a complex scheme designed to bypass official licensing restrictions using a front company to funnel high-demand tickets onto the black market.

The scandal erupted on the day of the opening ceremony with the arrest of an executive from THG Sports, a prominent corporate hospitality group. The investigation quickly escalated, leading to the high-profile arrest of OCI President and International Olympic Committee (IOC) member Pat Hickey in his Rio hotel room. Following his arrest, Hickey temporarily stepped aside from all his sports administration roles while maintaining his innocence. He did not officially resign from the IOC until December 2022, citing health reasons.

The fallout had significant institutional consequences. An independent inquiry commissioned by the Irish government (The Moran Report) later concluded that Hickey had run the OCI as a "personal fiefdom" and hid major ticketing contracts from his own executive board. While a Brazilian judge formally accepted criminal charges against Hickey and nine others, including money laundering and tax evasion, the Brazilian Supreme Court suspended the trial in November 2017 to review the merits of the case, and several charges were subsequently dropped in 2021 due to the expiration of the statutory time limits.

== First arrests ==
On 5 August, the day of the 2016 Summer Olympics opening ceremony, police in Rio de Janeiro arrested two people for attempted illegal resale of hundreds of tickets allocated to the Olympic Council of Ireland (OCI). One of the two, Kevin Mallon, was an executive with THG Sports, which was the OCI's authorised ticket reseller (ATR) in 2012 but not 2016; the OCI denied any involvement. Pro 10 Sports Management, the OCI's 2016 ATR, said the man arrested was working as their agent to distribute tickets which had been paid for legitimately.

== Arrest of Hickey ==
On 17 August, Pat Hickey, the OCI president, was arrested in Rio in connection with the investigation. A Brazilian judge remanded him in custody after concluding Hickey was a flight risk, and citing previous experience of then THG CEO James Sinton being investigated in relation to a 2014 FIFA World Cup ticket scam, being granted bail, leaving Brazil and never returning to face justice. Hickey was charged with three crimes. On 18 August, Hickey resigned as President of the OCI and that role passed to Willie O'Brien; Hickey also resigned his membership of the International Olympic Committee, his role as president of the European Olympic Committees and his role as vice-president of the Association of National Olympic Committees. At a news conference that afternoon, police presented Hickey's passport, Olympic credentials and air ticket to the world's media and explained that Rio's Civil Police Fraud Unit had arrested Hickey at about 6 a.m. (10 a.m. in Ireland). Having initially been told by his wife that her husband had returned to Ireland, Hickey was discovered in a separate hotel room assigned to his son and taken into custody. He was later photographed being wheeled from a hospital after complaining about heart problems and being given the all-clear by medical staff. On 20 August, Hickey and Mallon were reported to be sharing a prison cell. The same day, Brazilian police were reported to be investigating bank accounts linked to Hickey and others, stated their belief that a "relationship" exists between Hickey and English businessman Marcus Evans (owner of THG Sports) and told of an attempt being made to profit by millions of euro. Meanwhile, former Irish sports minister Leo Varadkar revealed Hickey tried to get financial assistance from Ireland's government for his son's corporate hospitality venue at London's 2012 Summer Olympics.

On 24 August 2016 Rio Police presented details of emails between Marcus Evans of THG and Hickey discussing the sale of tickets for the 2016 Rio Olympics.

The email cache presented by Rio police dates back to 2010, directly contradicting Hickey's public assertions that he had no relationship with Marcus Evans prior to 2012. Investigators revealed that the Marcus Evans Group had established ticketing ties with 35 other National Olympic Committees (NOCs), suggesting a systemic international network. Furthermore, phone records showed that on the eve of the Games, Hickey bypassed official channels to text IOC President Thomas Bach directly, requesting 500 supplementary high-demand tickets; the OCI subsequently received an allocation of 296 additional tickets. The International Olympic Committee (IOC) also refused to cooperate with the Moran Inquiry, stating the probe fell outside national jurisdiction, a decision Judge Moran explicitly criticized as a "major impediment" to his work. Separatly, Rio civil police formally designated Bach as a key witness, itending to officially summon him for questioning regarding his email and text exchanges with Hickey. Before authorities could issue the formal summons, Bach cancelled his planned trip to the Rio 2016 Paralympic Games opening ceremony, citing his attendance at a state funeral in Germany, becoming the first IOC President since 1984 to miss the event.

=== Charges and suspension of case ===
Hickey was due to face trial in Brazil over his alleged role in the Olympic Council of Ireland (OCI) ticketing affair after a Rio de Janeiro judge accepted the charges made by a public prosecutor against him and nine others. Public prosecutor Marcos Kac charged Hickey and nine others with ticket-touting, ambush marketing, theft, tax evasion, money-laundering, and criminal association. Hickey was allowed his passport back in November 2016 for a bond payment of 410,000 Euros. The month after The Association of National Olympic Committees (ANOC) loaned the money to Hickey so he could go back to Ireland. But in November 2017, the Brazilian Supreme Court suspended the case against Hickey and the other accused, all of whom deny any wrongdoing, in order to examine the merits of the prosecution case and of the Habeas Corpus request by lawyers for one of his co-accused, Kevin Mallon of THG Sports, after the lawyers had argued that they could not mount a proper defence as the prosecution had presented no evidence, and "nor was there clarity on his alleged involvement in any crime". It was not known how long this would take, and this was still unclear in June 2019 when Olympic Federation of Ireland President Sarah Keane expressed the hope that the International Olympic Committee's Ethics Commission would conclude its own investigation of the case before the 2020 Tokyo Olympics. In the meantime, Hickey and others had been criticised for lack of cooperation by the subsequent Moran inquiry into the matter. In October 2021, some of the charges against Hickey were dropped due to "extinction of punishability". Hickey resigned from the International Olympic Committee (IOC) in December 2022 citing health reasons, with a case still to be heard in relation to the remaining charges. Following the scandal, the OCI Board voted unanimously to permanently bar Hickey from ever rejoining or holding a position within the national Olympic body, regardless of the ultimate legal outcome in Brazil. Concurrently, the IOC Ethics Commission kept Hickey under a status of "self-suspension" for over five years, using the unresolved Brazilian criminal trial as a procedural shield to delay its own formal investigation until his final resignation.

== Role of Shane Ross ==
Before Hickey's arrest, Irish Minister for Transport, Tourism and Sport Shane Ross promised a "robust inquiry" of his own, after expressing concern at the lack of an independent investigation. On 14 August, Ross flew to Rio de Janeiro to meet with Hickey. He did so twice, "in tense circumstances" shortly before Hickey's arrest. Ross attempted to have Hickey permit an independent member be included on the OCI's inquiry. Following Hickey's arrest, Ross flew back in Dublin to meet Attorney General Máire Whelan. Meanwhile, Brazilian police revealed an email they found on Hickey's phone calling for Ross to be "put back into his box".

== John Delaney, et al. ==
On 21 August, Brazilian police conducted an early morning raid at the Irish office in the Olympic village. They confiscated the passports of three OCI members; Team Ireland Chef de Mission Kevin Kilty, OCI Secretary General Dermot Henihen and OCI chief executive Stephen Martin. They also confiscated electronic equipment and unused Olympic tickets. The other names on the warrant included OCI officials Linda O'Reilly and Willie O'Brien, the man who had earlier replaced Hickey as president.

The passports of Team Ireland Chef de Mission Kevin Kilty, OCI Secretary General Dermot Henihen and OCI chief executive Stephen Martin were subsequently returned as they were deemed to be of no further interest to the investigation.

Brazilian police were also given permission to seize a sixth passport, that of Football Association of Ireland (FAI) chief executive John Delaney, who is also OCI vice-president and was a prominent figure in Irish sport. Delaney came under intense scrutiny from investigators because his signature appeared alongside Pat Hickey's on several highly controversial, long-term commercial ticketing contracts signed between the OCI and THG Sports.

== Investigations ==
=== Non-statutory inquiry ===
A non-statutory inquiry headed by retired High Court judge, Justice Carroll Moran, to investigate the issue was announced on 24 August 2016. The published Moran Report, released in August 2017, described Hickey's 28-year tenure as "autocratic", revealing he received an undisclosed personal honorarium of 60 000 euros per year directly from OCI funds. Judge Moran highlighted massive financial anomalies in OCI's governance, noting that THG Sports had paid a $1 million fee for the London 2012 and Sochi 2014 rights without any clear corporate explanation of how THG intended to recoup such an amount legitimately. Crucially, the inquiry exposed that Hickey had signed a binding contract in January 2016 extending THG's exclusive ticketing rights until 2026, completely hiding the agreement from the OCI executive board.

=== OCI review ===
On 25 August 2016, the OCI announced data security firm Espion to secure, copy and seal the OCI server and all OCI electronic data. The following day, the OCI announced it had appointed auditors Grant Thornton to conduct its own review of the issue.

On 9 September 2016, the OCI announced that it had chosen Deloitte to review the manner in which the OCI is governed under its current constitution.

The recommendations from the Deloitte governance review and subsequent internal assessments led to a comprehensive structural overhaul of the organization. At an extraordinary general meeting (EGM), the body implemented a series of strict reforms, including the introduction of term limits for executives and the appointment of an independent board. To completely distance the organization from the reputational damage of the ticketing scandal, the body officially rebranded in September 2018, changing its name from the Olympic Council of Ireland (OCI) to the Olympic Federation of Ireland (OFI).
