= British Triathlon Federation =

Sports national governing body

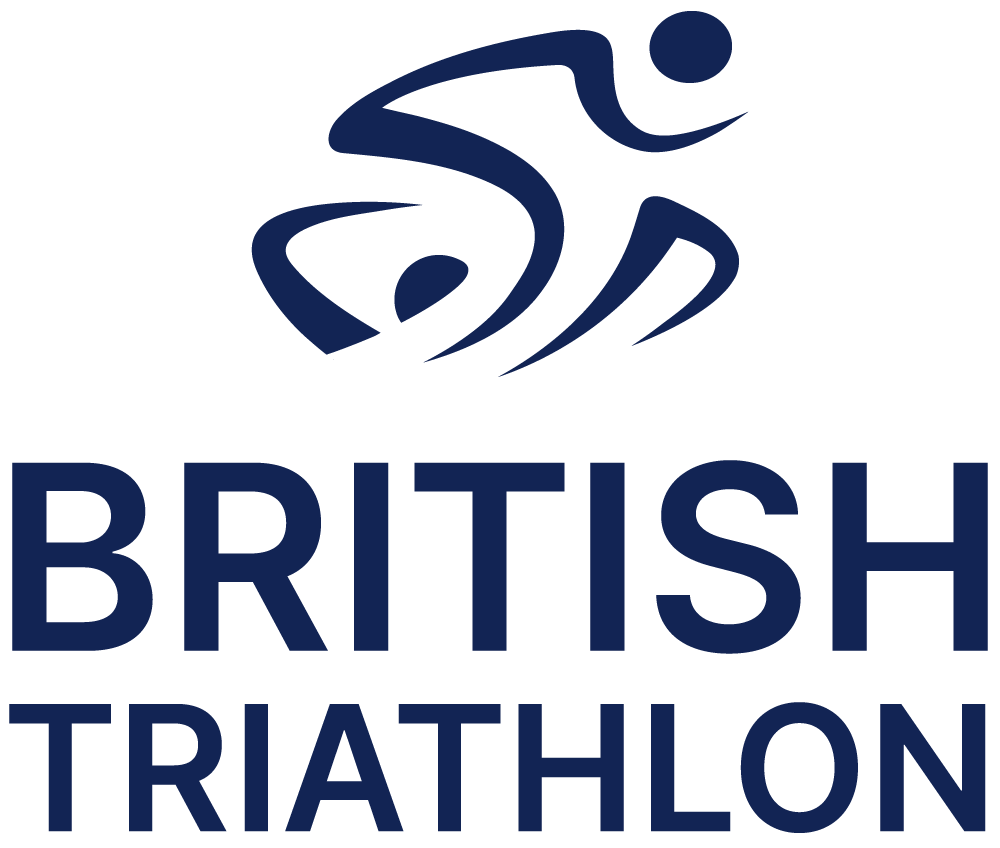
- Sport: Triathlon multisport
- Jurisdiction: Great Britain
- Abbreviation: BTF
- Headquarters: 3 Oakwood Drive, Loughborough, Leicestershire, LE11 3QF
- CEO: Ruth Daniels
- Sponsor: Descente

Official website
- www.britishtriathlon.org
- (United Kingdom)

The British Triathlon Federation (formerly the British Triathlon Association), trading under the brand name British Triathlon is the national governing body for triathlon, duathlon and associated multisport in Great Britain. It administers triathlon in England, Scotland, Wales, the Channel Islands and the Isle of Man. It represents Britain at the world body, the International Triathlon Union (ITU) and the regional body the European Triathlon Union (ETU). The BTF also selects athletes to represent the national team, at races such as the world triathlon series and the Olympic games.

== Structure ==
It is a federation of the three Home Nation membership associations (Triathlon England, Triathlon Scotland and Welsh Triathlon). Triathlon in Northern Ireland is organised under Ulster Triathlon, part of the all-Ireland governing body Triathlon Ireland. However North Irish athletes may compete for Great Britain as long as they have a valid British passport and are a member of one of the three home nations associations. Clubs in both the Channel Islands and on the Isle of Man are registered through triathlon England.

=== Membership of governing bodies ===
The British Triathlon Federation is one of the 32 national sports governing bodies represented in the British Olympic Association and is a member of, and British triathlon’s representative organisation with, the European Triathlon Union and the International Triathlon Union.

=== Funding ===
British Triathlon's has two key funding streams, corporate sponsorship and the UK Sport Lottery Funding. A large selection of supporting partners give corporate sponsorship to BTF.

== Function ==
It is responsible for such matters as Great Britain’s international representation in the sport, Great Britain's Elite and Age Group teams, British and international events, all matters relating to doping and various other administrative functions and services that the three Home Nations share.

== See also ==
- ITU Triathlon World Championships
