= Olympic Council =

Olympic Council may refer to:

- Olympic Council of Asia, a governing body of sports in Asia
- Olympic Council of Ireland, the national Olympic Committee for Ireland
- Singapore National Olympic Council, a registered society
