= All Ireland League =

All Ireland League may refer to any of the following All-Ireland competitions.

- All-Ireland League (rugby union), a rugby union competition
- All-Ireland League (association football), a proposed, but ultimately abandoned, soccer league
- National Football League (Ireland), a Gaelic football league that runs the All-Ireland Senior Football Championship
