= Nick Webb (journalist) =

Irish journalist (born 1971)

Nick Webb (born 1971) is an Irish journalist. He succeeded his father-in-law Shane Ross as Business Editor at the Sunday Independent when Ross was elected as a TD. Webb married Rebecca Ross, Shane Ross's daughter, in July 1997.

In 2009, he and Shane Ross were jointly honoured both as business journalist of the year and as overall Journalist of the Year. He had previously been Smurfit Business school specialist reporter of the year in 2008.

Sunday Independent journalist Nick Webb broke the FÁS expenses scandal with Shane Ross in October 2008, before they exposed the culture of corruption and waste at semi-state transport company CIÉ. The pair have written a bestselling book called Wasters, exposing the scandal of "the people who squander your taxes on white elephant projects, international junkets and favours for their mates - and how they get away with it". Published by Penguin in October 2010. Other books published by the duo are The Untouchables (2012) and The Bankers (2009).

In a November 2018 RTE broadcast of Ireland's Rich List, Nick courted controversy by describing the tragedy of the 9-11 terrorist attack in New York as "a really big moment" for Declan Ganley, who saw an investment opportunity in the lack of communication between emergency services on the day.
