= List of Irish records in Olympic weightlifting =

The following are the national records in Olympic weightlifting in Ireland. Records are maintained in each weight class for the snatch lift, clean and jerk lift, and the total for both lifts by the Irish Amateur Weightlifting Association (IAWLA).

== Current records ==
=== Men ===
Event	Record	Athlete	Date	Meet	Place	Ref
60 kg
Snatch	104 kg	Ben Brennan	24 July 2025	European Youth Championships	Madrid, Spain	
Clean & Jerk	135 kg	Ben Brennan	24 July 2025	European Youth Championships	Madrid, Spain	
Total	239 kg	Ben Brennan	24 July 2025	European Youth Championships	Madrid, Spain	
65 kg
Snatch	118 kg	Harrison McGrogan	26 July 2025	European Youth Championships	Madrid, Spain	
Clean & Jerk	152 kg	Harrison McGrogan	29 October 2025	European Junior Championships	Durrës, Albania	
Total	267 kg	Harrison McGrogan	26 July 2025	European Youth Championships	Madrid, Spain	
71 kg
Snatch	129 kg	Harrison McGrogan	16 May 2026	British Championships	Telford, United Kingdom	
Clean & Jerk	170 kg	Harrison McGrogan	21 April 2026	European Championships	Batumi, Georgia	
Total	298 kg	Harrison McGrogan	21 April 2026	European Championships	Batumi, Georgia	
79 kg
Snatch	128 kg	Harrison McGrogan	6 July 2026	Irish Championships	Waterford, Ireland	
Clean & Jerk	165 kg	Harrison McGrogan	6 July 2026	Irish Championships	Waterford, Ireland	
Total	293 kg	Harrison McGrogan	6 July 2026	Irish Championships	Waterford, Ireland	
88 kg
Snatch	138 kg	Seán Brown	17 May 2025	Connacht Open	Claregalway, Ireland	
Clean & Jerk	171 kg	Seán Brown	18 October 2025	Celtic Nations Championships	Glasgow, United Kingdom	
Total	308 kg	Seán Brown	17 May 2025	Connacht Open	Claregalway, Ireland	
94 kg
Snatch	142 kg	Seán Brown	18 April 2025	European Championships	Chișinău, Moldova	
Clean & Jerk	167 kg	Seán Brown	18 April 2025	European Championships	Chișinău, Moldova	
Total	309 kg	Seán Brown	18 April 2025	European Championships	Chișinău, Moldova	
110 kg
Snatch	145 kg	Seamus O'Conchubhair	17 August 2025	Leinster Open	Athboy, Ireland	
Clean & Jerk	190 kg	Seamus O'Conchubhair	8 February 2026	Munster Open	Cork, Ireland	
Total	334 kg	Seamus O'Conchubhair	8 February 2026	Munster Open	Cork, Ireland	
+110 kg
Snatch	153 kg	Cian Nowlan Rooney	6 July 2026	Irish Championships	Waterford, Ireland	
Clean & Jerk	202 kg	Cian Nowlan Rooney	6 July 2026	Irish Championships	Waterford, Ireland	
Total	355 kg	Cian Nowlan Rooney	6 July 2026	Irish Championships	Waterford, Ireland	

=== Women ===
Event	Record	Athlete	Date	Meet	Place	Ref
48 kg
Snatch	68 kg	Rebecca Copeland	2 October 2025	World Championships	Førde, Norway	
Clean & Jerk	83 kg	Rebecca Copeland	2 October 2025	World Championships	Førde, Norway	
Total	151 kg	Rebecca Copeland	2 October 2025	World Championships	Førde, Norway	
53 kg
Snatch	70 kg	Standard				
Clean & Jerk	85 kg	Standard				
Total	155 kg	Standard				
58 kg
Snatch	74 kg	Standard				
Clean & Jerk	91 kg	Standard				
Total	165 kg	Standard				
63 kg
Snatch	87 kg	Hannah Crymble	16 April 2025	European Championships	Chișinău, Moldova	
Clean & Jerk	108 kg	Hannah Crymble	6 July 2026	Irish Championships	Waterford, Ireland	
Total	194 kg	Hannah Crymble	5 October 2025	World Championships	Førde, Norway	
69 kg
Snatch	90 kg	Hannah Crymble	9 November 2025	Ulster Open	Belfast, United Kingdom	
Clean & Jerk	116 kg	Gina McMonagle	22 April 2026	European Championships	Batumi, Georgia	
Total	206 kg	Gina McMonagle	22 April 2026	European Championships	Batumi, Georgia	
77 kg
Snatch	95 kg	Keilin Coleman-Gooch	18 October 2025	Celtic Nations Championships	Glasgow, United Kingdom	
Clean & Jerk	124 kg	Keilin Coleman-Gooch	8 October 2025	World Championships	Førde, Norway	
Total	217 kg	Keilin Coleman-Gooch	8 October 2025	World Championships	Førde, Norway	
86 kg
Snatch	91 kg	Standard				
Clean & Jerk	112 kg	Standard				
Total	203 kg	Standard				
+86 kg
Snatch	96 kg	Standard				
Clean & Jerk	117 kg	Standard				
Total	213 kg	Standard				

== Historical records ==
=== Men (2018–2025) ===
Event	Record	Athlete	Date	Meet	Place	Ref
55 kg
Snatch	98 kg	Standard				
Clean & Jerk	121 kg	Standard				
Total	217 kg	Standard				
61 kg
Snatch	109 kg	Harrison McGrogan	1 May 2025	World Youth Championships	Lima, Peru	
Clean & Jerk	137 kg	Harrison McGrogan	1 May 2025	World Youth Championships	Lima, Peru	
Total	246 kg	Standard	1 May 2025	World Youth Championships	Lima, Peru	
67 kg
Snatch	113 kg	Standard				
Clean & Jerk	139 kg	Wayne Healy	19 October 2021	European Masters Championships	Alkmaar, Netherlands	
Total	249 kg	Wayne Healy	19 October 2021	European Masters Championships	Alkmaar, Netherlands	
73 kg
Snatch	126 kg	Stewart Gilbert	23 October 2019	European U23 Championships	Bucharest, Romania	
Clean & Jerk	155 kg	Stewart Gilbert	29 July 2023	Irish Championships	Waterford, Ireland	
Total	280 kg	Stewart Gilbert	29 July 2023	Irish Championships	Waterford, Ireland	
81 kg
Snatch	146 kg	Seán Brown	2 February 2019	Irish Championships	Dublin, Ireland	
Clean & Jerk	174 kg	Seán Brown	29 February 2020	Malta International Open	Cospicua, Malta	
Total	317 kg	Seán Brown	21 September 2019	World Championships	Pattaya, Thailand	
89 kg
Snatch	147 kg	Seán Brown	5 April 2024	World Cup	Phuket, Thailand	
Clean & Jerk	177 kg	Seán Brown	17 February 2024	European Championships	Sofia, Bulgaria	
Total	320 kg	Seán Brown	10 September 2023	World Championships	Riyadh, Saudi Arabia	
96 kg
Snatch	145 kg	Shane Roche	21 October 2023	Cork Open	Cork, Ireland	
Clean & Jerk	172 kg	Ciarán Barnes	19 August 2024	Irish Championships	Tipperary, Ireland	
Total	316 kg	Shane Roche	21 October 2023	Cork Open	Cork, Ireland	
102 kg
Snatch	138 kg	Standard				
Clean & Jerk	172 kg	Seamus O'Conchubhair	14 July 2019	Leinster Open Championships	Dublin, Ireland	
Total	307 kg	Standard				
109 kg
Snatch	142 kg	Standard				
Clean & Jerk	186 kg	Seán Rigsby	27 July 2019	American Open Series 2	Albuquerque, United States	
Total	326 kg	Seán Rigsby	27 July 2019	American Open Series 2	Albuquerque, United States	
+109 kg
Snatch	146 kg	Standard				
Clean & Jerk	185 kg	Cian Nowlan Rooney	3 November 2024	European U23 Championships	Raszyn, Poland	
Total	324 kg	Standard				

=== Men (1998–2018) ===
Event	Record	Athlete	Date	Meet	Place	Ref
-56 kg
Snatch	70 kg	Alan Forde	21 September 2002			
Clean & Jerk	82.5 kg	Alan Forde	9 March 2003			
Total	150 kg	Alan Forde	21 September 2002			
-62 kg
Snatch	112.5 kg	Wayne Healy	21 November 1999			
Clean & Jerk	137.5 kg	Wayne Healy	21 November 1999			
Total	250 kg	Wayne Healy	21 November 1999			
-69 kg
Snatch	116 kg	Wayne Healy	3 November 2011			
Clean & Jerk	143 kg	Stewart Gilbert	30 January 2016			
Total	258 kg	Wayne Healy	3 November 2011			
-77 kg
Snatch	123 kg	Stewart Gilbert	3 February 2018	Irish Championships		
Clean & Jerk	157 kg	Cathal Byrd	14 April 2015	European Championships	Tbilisi, Georgia	
Total	274 kg	Stewart Gilbert	3 February 2018	Irish Championships		
-85 kg
Snatch	154 kg	Clarence Kennedy	6 December 2012			
Clean & Jerk	172 kg	Seán Brown	12 May 2018	Meissen Cup	Meissen, Germany	
Total	314 kg	Seán Brown	12 May 2018	Meissen Cup	Meissen, Germany	
-94 kg
Snatch	152 kg	Clarence Kennedy	7 July 2012			
Clean & Jerk	190 kg	Clarence Kennedy	10 November 2012	4th Janusz Przedpełski Memorial	Opole, Poland	
Total	340 kg	Clarence Kennedy	10 November 2012	4th Janusz Przedpełski Memorial	Opole, Poland	
-105 kg
Snatch	134 kg	Simon Keartland	3 February 2018	Irish Championships		
Clean & Jerk	168 kg	Simon Keartland	4 February 2017			
Total	301 kg	Kevin D'Arcy	30 January 2016			
+105 kg
Snatch	138 kg	Seán Rigsby	3 February 2018	Irish Championships		
Clean & Jerk	187 kg	Seán Rigsby	3 February 2018	Irish Championships		
Total	325 kg	Seán Rigsby	3 February 2018	Irish Championships		

=== Women (2018–2025) ===
Event	Record	Athlete	Date	Meet	Place	Ref
45 kg
Snatch	55 kg	Standard				
Clean & Jerk	69 kg	Standard				
Total	122 kg	Standard				
49 kg
Snatch	76 kg	Tham Nguyen	4 September 2023	World Championships	Riyadh, Saudi Arabia	
Clean & Jerk	98 kg	Tham Nguyen	15 April 2023	European Championships	Yerevan, Armenia	
Total	173 kg	Tham Nguyen	15 April 2023	European Championships	Yerevan, Armenia	
55 kg
Snatch	76 kg	Tham Nguyen	18 November 2023	Celtic Nations	Waterford, Ireland	
Clean & Jerk	95 kg	Tham Nguyen	9 October 2022	Cork Open	Cork, Ireland	
Total	171 kg	Tham Nguyen	18 November 2023	Celtic Nations	Waterford, Ireland	
59 kg
Snatch	85 kg	Hannah Crymble	29 July 2023	Irish Championships	Waterford, Ireland	
Clean & Jerk	105 kg	Hannah Crymble	29 July 2023	Irish Championships	Waterford, Ireland	
Total	190 kg	Hannah Crymble	29 July 2023	Irish Championships	Waterford, Ireland	
64 kg
Snatch	87 kg	Hannah Crymble	16 April 2025	European Championships	Chișinău, Moldova	
Clean & Jerk	106 kg	Hannah Crymble	9 June 2024	Cork Open	Cork, Ireland	
Total	192 kg	Hannah Crymble	16 April 2025	European Championships	Chișinău, Moldova	
71 kg
Snatch	87 kg	Gina McMonagle	17 April 2025	European Championships	Chișinău, Moldova	
Clean & Jerk	111 kg	Gina McMonagle	18 August 2024	Irish Championships	Tipperary, Ireland	
Total	197 kg	Gina McMonagle	17 April 2025	European Championships	Chișinău, Moldova	
76 kg
Snatch	90 kg	Keilin Coleman Gooch	17 June 2023	Memorial Decottignies	Comines, France	
Clean & Jerk	115 kg	Keilin Coleman Gooch	31 July 2023	European U23 Championships	Bucharest, Romania	
Total	205 kg	Keilin Coleman Gooch	31 July 2023	European U23 Championships	Bucharest, Romania	
81 kg
Snatch	80 kg	Standard				
Clean & Jerk	105 kg	Wuraola Oladimeji	28 August 2024	Women's Grand Prix	Baden bei Wien, Austria	
Total	178 kg	Wuraola Oladimeji	28 August 2024	Women's Grand Prix	Baden bei Wien, Austria	
87 kg
Snatch	82 kg	Standard				
Clean & Jerk	103 kg	Standard				
Total	183 kg	Standard				
+87 kg
Snatch	87 kg	Standard				
Clean & Jerk	109 kg	Standard				
Total	194 kg	Standard				

=== Women (1998–2018) ===
Event	Record	Athlete	Date	Meet	Place	Ref
-48 kg
Snatch						
Clean & Jerk						
Total						
-53 kg
Snatch						
Clean & Jerk						
Total						
-58 kg
Snatch						
Clean & Jerk						
Total						
-63 kg
Snatch						
Clean & Jerk						
Total						
-69 kg
Snatch						
Clean & Jerk						
Total						
-75 kg
Snatch						
Clean & Jerk						
Total						
+75 kg
Snatch						
Clean & Jerk						
Total						
