= Shane Ross =

Irish politician and journalist (born 1949)

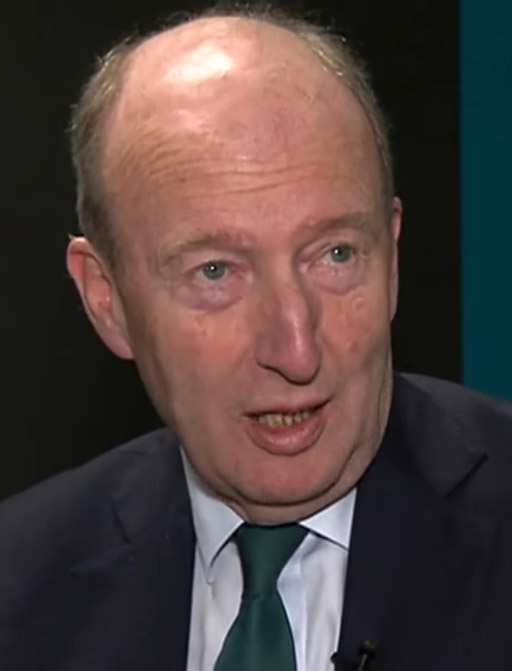
- Ross in 2020

Minister for Transport, Tourism and Sport
- In office 6 May 2016 – 27 June 2020
- Taoiseach: Enda Kenny; Leo Varadkar
- Preceded by: Paschal Donohoe
- Succeeded by: Eamon Ryan (Transport); Catherine Martin (Tourism and Sport)

Teachta Dála
- In office February 2016 – February 2020
- Constituency: Dublin Rathdown
- In office February 2011 – February 2016
- Constituency: Dublin South

Senator
- In office 8 October 1981 – 25 February 2011
- Constituency: Dublin University

Personal details
- Born: 11 July 1949 (age 77) Goatstown, Dublin, Ireland
- Party: Independent
- Other political affiliations: Fine Gael (until 1997)
- Spouse: Ruth Buchanan
- Children: 2
- Parent: John N. Ross (father)
- Relatives: Nick Webb (son-in-law)
- Education: Trinity College Dublin; University of Geneva

Shane Peter Nathaniel Ross (born 11 July 1949) is an Irish former independent politician who served as Minister for Transport, Tourism and Sport from May 2016 to June 2020. He was a Teachta Dála (TD) for the Dublin Rathdown constituency from 2016 to 2020, and previously from 2011 to 2016 for the Dublin South constituency. He was a member of Seanad Éireann for the Dublin University from 1981 to 2011, until his election to Dáil Éireann at the 2011 general election.

He is a former business editor of the Sunday Independent. He was a Fine Gael Wicklow County Councillor, and a one-time Fine Gael general election candidate in the Wicklow constituency. In the 31st Dáil he was a member of the Dáil Public Accounts Committee. He co-founded the Independent Alliance with Michael Fitzmaurice in 2015. He was re-elected to the 32nd Dáil, and subsequently appointed by Taoiseach Enda Kenny as Minister for Transport, Tourism and Sport in May 2016.

== Early life and career ==
Shane Ross was born in Dublin in 1949. He is the son of former Senator and prominent member of the legal fraternity, John N. Ross, and the noted gardener and writer Ruth Isabel Cherrington. He was schooled at St Stephen's School, Dundrum, and Rugby School, before attending Trinity College Dublin, where he graduated with a degree in history and political science in 1971. During his time at Trinity he was the Record Secretary of the College Historical Society. A stockbroker with NCB, Ross was Business Editor of the Sunday Independent, Ireland's biggest-selling weekend broadsheet, until his election to the Dáil in 2011, when he resigned from the post. He is married to Ruth Buchanan, a former presenter and journalist with RTÉ, Ireland's national broadcaster. His son-in-law is Nick Webb, who succeeded him as Business Editor of the Sunday Independent.

He was first elected to the Seanad in 1981, as an Independent candidate for the Dublin University constituency, and was re-elected on nine occasions, becoming the longest-serving member of the house.

He stood unsuccessfully as an Independent candidate at the 1984 European Parliament election, for the Dublin constituency. At the 1991 local elections, he was elected as a Fine Gael candidate to Wicklow County Council for the Bray local electoral area, and served until 1999. He stood as a candidate for the party in the Wicklow constituency at the 1992 general election, but did not gain a seat, remaining instead in the Seanad where he once again sat as an Independent Senator following the 1997 election.

He is one of Ireland's most visible business commentators, promoting free enterprise, small government and low taxes, and is widely identified as one of the most visible champions of laissez-faire capitalism in Irish politics, praising former Finance Minister Charlie McCreevy, as a "brilliant Minister in the boom years" and lauded McCreevy's controversial tax individualisation as "visionary". He profited from the boom in Irish land prices, selling his home at Carrickmines to a developer in 2004 for an estimated €4 million to €4.5 million an acre; however, he subsequently bought a house in Enniskerry, County Wicklow, for €6.2 million in 2005. Despite labelling himself as one of Ireland's foremost business commentators his record as a stock picker is mixed: as he noted himself, "my record when a stockbroker was so bad that Dermot Desmond rightly gave me my P45. ...if any readers are beginning to take me seriously, remember it was I who advised people to sell First Active Shares when they went public and subsequently quadrupled and it was I who told innocent investors not to touch Ryanair shares with a barge pole at the flotation. They rocketed."

== Shareholder activism ==
Ross promotes himself as standing up for small shareholders and consumers. In 2000, he and Eamon Dunphy championed the case of small shareholders of eircom, after shares in the former state-owned company fell in value by more than a third in just over a year. Ross took the board of directors to task over the level of salaries, bonuses and fees being paid, and denounced a plan whereby senior management were to get share options at a value below the flotation price. He was also sharply critical of the decision to sell the mobile phone arm Eircell to Vodafone and later sought the dismissal of 5 board members at the March 2001 AGM, citing poor share price performance and poor acquisitions.

At a shareholders' meeting in May 2005, Ross highlighted the monopolistic practices of tolling agency NTR plc. Ross persisted in drawing attention to the issue, criticising the National Roads Authority in August 2008, for its inadequate and confusing management of the M50 barrier-free tolling system, and was reported in The Sunday Times of London as having declared that "the removal of the barrier should have been cause for celebration. Instead, we have higher tolls, an administrative mess and pending chaos".

=== Stance on corporate governance and cronyism ===
The packaging conglomerate Smurfit Group, small shareholdings in which were held by many Irish investors, has also been a frequent target for Ross, specifically its high executive pay, poor shareholder returns, and alleged nepotism and cronyism.

=== Criticism of Bank of Ireland ===
Prior to the Irish financial crisis he was a persistent critic of the performance of Bank of Ireland, of which he was a shareholder. He contrasted the conservative performance of the "establishment" Bank of Ireland with other financial institutions, notably Irish Nationwide Building Society (INBS) and Anglo Irish Bank (Anglo) which he praised. In his Sunday Independent column he described Michael Fingleton's Irish Nationwide as publishing "a cracking set of figures... he even leaves superstar Sean Fitzpatrick's Anglo Irish standing". In another column, he dismissed shareholder critics of Fingleton, notably Brendan Burgess, and contrasted the small shareholder rebellions of eircom, Smurfit and First Active with that of the INBS, the CEO of which, he claimed, "despite all his abrasiveness, was delivering small riches to them", Ross dismissed the corporate governance concerns of Fingleton's critics, writing "for all his faults, has delivered the only thing that matters in business: profit".

In his article on Pernod Ricard executive Richard Burrows' appointment as the Governor of the Bank of Ireland, Ross claimed it was mainly due to Burrows' social status as a "toff" and criticised the bank for not even interviewing the "far too dynamic" Sean FitzPatrick, then CEO of Anglo Irish Bank. In 2007, Ross praised Sean Quinn's purchase of a stake in "anti-establishment Anglo Irish Bank" and referred to Quinn as "this genius... [who] has combined being a champion of the customer with making a mint", describing Quinn Direct as "the most successful insurance business in Ireland".

=== Anglo Irish Bank revelations ===
In April 2008, Ross revealed that a group of Anglo customers were planning to launch a leveraged fund to buy Anglo shares to "squeeze" the Anglo "short sellers" whom Ross blamed for the collapse in the Anglo share price. Ross had been briefed by a member of the group, and quoted him saying "We are going to teach the brokers and hedge funds that damaged the bank a salutary lesson... They will come out of this with their fingers burned"; the episode became known as the Maple 10 and cost Anglo and ultimately the taxpayer €451 million. As leverage for the Anglo share purchase was provided by Anglo, this coordinated action would have constituted market abuse.

Ross was also a trenchant critic of the under-performance of the Irish Pension Funds, and contrasted their performance with the SVM Global's Saltire Fund, the hedge fund which he chaired; however, in 2013, the Saltire Fund revealed a large loss of 32.4% during a period in which global stock markets had gained 17.7%.

== Campaigning and political activism ==
In the aftermath of the voters' rejection of the Lisbon Treaty in its first referendum in June 2008, in spite of support for the treaty by the major political parties, Ross highlighted the "disconnect" between the ruling caste of the nation's politicians and the democratic will of the public.

In January 2009, he took the Central Bank of Ireland and Ernst & Young to task for their failings leading up to the nationalisation of Anglo Irish Bank. In his capacity as Senator, Ross pressed Allied Irish Bank executives on the bank's fraudulent offshore dealings involving subsidiaries and Caribbean front operations, charging that the only party to be disciplined in the affair was the whistleblower who brought it to light and forcing from the bank's CEO Eugene Sheehy, the admission that the institution may have been in breach of the Companies Act. He authored an account of the Irish financial crisis later that year – The Bankers: How the banks brought Ireland to its knees. In October of that year Ross drew the ire of the public transport company CIÉ for publicising charges of widescale fraud and mismanagement within the semi-state organisation. He has criticised government inaction in voicing concerns about the Sellafield nuclear plant, and has called for stronger legal protection for whistleblowers in cases of fraud and corruption.

For his investigation into waste at the state training agency FÁS pursuant to the FÁS expenses scandal, Ross was recognised by his peers as the 2009 Journalist of the Year. Ross is frequently featured as a source by international news media, and has been cited as "one of Ireland's foremost financial commentators" by the Associated Press.

== Dáil Éireann ==
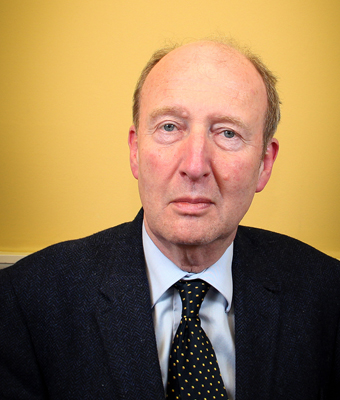
Official portrait

On 15 January 2011, during the course of a television interview, Ross announced that he would stand in the Dublin South constituency at the next general election, which at that date had not been announced but was expected very soon. He had refused an offer to run for the resurgent Fine Gael party and become an "insignificant backbencher", and was determined instead to stand as an Independent candidate, declaring: "I think you're going to see in this election a huge number of similar independents who want to put an end to cronyism, who want to see a change in the political system, who want to put an end to Civil War politics in Ireland, who want to see an end to the kind of tribal politics we've got, who are going to stand in the election as well". During the general election campaign Fine Gael TD Alan Shatter attacked Ross, saying the Senator "was a cheerleader for Sean FitzPatrick and Michael Fingleton" and had "reserved his criticism of bankers for AIB and Bank of Ireland and celebrated the enormous profits earned by Anglo and Nationwide". In the election Ross received the second-highest vote in the country, heading the poll in Dublin South with 17,075 votes.

In April 2011, Ross claimed the Government was "wearing the clothes of the last government of Brian Cowen" in its economic policy. He asked why senior bondholders had to be treated in the same way as depositors. "They are completely different creatures", he said. "Senior bondholders go out there and take a risk and make an investment." He claimed that Enda Kenny's greatest cheerleaders in his policy were in Fianna Fáil. "The support is coming from the last government", he added. "And very few people can see the difference, if there is any, between this government and the last government in its attitude to the banks." Ross accused the Government of completely and utterly surrendering to the IMF and the EU. "They know that, we know that . . . everybody knows that", he said. "Default, apparently, is the word which cannot be mentioned in this chamber."

In February 2013, Ross spoke in the Dáil against water fluoridation, referring to a Hot Press article he cited Declan Waugh whom he called "a well known scientist" and claimed fluoridation was the cause of Ireland's "high rates of cancer, cardiovascular disease and diabetes". He also claimed that Ireland had double the incidence of Down's syndrome of Northern Ireland as a result.

In March 2015, Ross and Michael Fitzmaurice founded the Independent Alliance, which was later joined by John Halligan, Finian McGrath, Tom Fleming and Feargal Quinn.

Ross lost his seat at the 2020 general election. "I don’t think I’ve been punished at all," he said afterward. "I think what's happened is that what the constituents have done is said we want to try something else we want a change from Fine Gael and the Independent Alliance and that is absolutely their entitlement and I accept it fully and I wish my successors a great deal of success." Ross claimed that the alliance had been a "very responsible if radical" part of the Government, stating: "My colleagues and I certainly had an effect on the way government operated and we're proud of that."

== Ministerial career ==
=== Transport ===
At the 2016 general election Ross topped the poll in Dublin Rathdown, and was elected. Taoiseach Enda Kenny nominated him as Minister for Transport, Tourism and Sport in May 2016. His most significant action as minister for transport was the introduction of the Road Traffic Act(2018). The law up to that point had allowed a first-time drink-driver offender, if they were between 50 mg and 80 mg, to opt for a fine and three penalty points instead of disqualification. This option was removed. Another section of the Act made it an offence for the owner of a vehicle to allow an unaccompanied learner driver to use it.

In December 2018 Ross announced that the NTA (National Transport Authority) was being tasked with setting up a dedicated National Cycling Office to provide cycling infrastructure.

=== Tourism ===
It had been a demand of Kevin "Boxer" Moran of the Independent Alliance in the Programme for Government that a new tourism brand for the midlands would be launched by the new government. Ross launched the "Ireland's Hidden Heartlands" brand in April 2018.

=== Sport ===
There were two major dramas while Ross held the Sports brief.

At the 2016 Olympics in Brazil a story broke alleging the involvement of the Olympic Council of Ireland in a ticket-touting scandal. Pat Hickey, president of the Olympic Council of Ireland, was arrested. Hickey claimed that there was no foundation for the accusation and that an OIC inquiry would show this. He temporarily stepped down from his position. Ross insisted that there had to be a member independent of the OIC on any inquiry; Hickey resisted. The government set up an independent non-statutory inquiry under retired judge Carroll Moran. Hickey and other OIC members refused to give evidence at the tribunal. After the publication of the Moran report the OCI met and voted unanimously not to reinstate Hickey.

On 17 March 2019 an article in The Sunday Times reported that John Delaney, head of the Football Association of Ireland for many years, had given a loan of €100,000 to the FAI. Subsequently, it became obvious that the FAI was in serious financial trouble. When the 2018 accounts became available in December 2019, the FAI was shown to have liabilities of €55 million. In an article in the Irish Times, Professor Niamh Brennan, an expert on corporate governance, wrote "The organisation is at death's door. As I see it, only government intervention can save Irish soccer."

A tripartite bailout was arranged involving the government, UEFA and Bank of Ireland.

== Post-political career ==
In November 2022, Ross claimed that Fine Gael needed to be out of government "for the good of the party and the good of the country". He also claimed that Sinn Féin leader Mary Lou McDonald would be next Taoiseach, calling her "a superstar" who left other politicians "trailing in her wake".

He has written articles for the Irish Independent, UnHerd and the News Letter.

== Sporting gaffes ==
Ross's apparent lack of knowledge of sports in multiple disciplines has been repeatedly observed. He tweeted, "Go Katie go!", shortly after Finnish boxer Mira Potkonen knocked Katie Taylor out of the 2016 Summer Olympics. A few days later, after Thomas Barr twice broke the Irish record on his way to finishing fourth in the final of the men's 400 metres hurdles at the same Olympics, Ross instead congratulated a "Thomas Barry". Following the Ireland national rugby union team's 2018 Six Nations Championship Grand Slam, Ross tweeted a photograph of himself alongside Ireland players Johnny Sexton and Rob Kearney; the photograph's caption stated, "Congratulations and welcome home this evening to superstars Johnny Sexton and Dave Kearney". Rob Kearney responded to Ross's error by tweeting: "You're welcome Leo", followed by a wink emoticon.

In May 2018, Ross tweeted that he was "delighted to confirm" that a fee-paying school, Wesley College (located in his constituency), would be given a grant of €150,000 to resurface its field hockey pitch. Ross was then criticised for announcing increased funding for the Ireland women's national field hockey team following their second-place finish at the 2018 Women's Hockey World Cup in August 2018, the timing being seen to indicate a publicity stunt on Ross's part. The following month, a statement from Ross congratulated a "Dominant Pušpure" after Sanita Pušpure's gold medal win at the 2018 World Rowing Championships. In mid-November 2018, Ross tweeted a photograph of himself inside the stadium celebrating the Ireland rugby union team's victory over the All Blacks in Dublin; the photograph portrayed his tie poking through an open trouser fly.

During a radio interview on Newstalk on 30 November 2018, Ross displayed a lack of knowledge of association football; initially crediting the goalkeeper Shay Given with having scored the winning goal against Germany in UEFA Euro 2016 qualifying in October 2015, Ross corrected himself and credited Given with the assist and Shane Long with the goal. The problem, which was not corrected during the interview, was that Given had gone off injured after half an hour and it was his replacement, Darren Randolph, who had provided the famous assist. During the same interview Ross congratulated a "Shane Kenny" on being appointed manager of the Republic of Ireland national under-21 football team, with the intention of being promoted to the senior job after UEFA Euro 2020.

== Publications ==
- Ross, Shane (2009). The Bankers: How the banks brought Ireland to its knees. Dublin: Penguin Ireland. ISBN 978-1-84488-216-8.
- Ross, Shane; Nick Webb (2010). Wasters. Dublin: Penguin Ireland. ISBN 978-1-84488-251-9.
- Ross, Shane; Nick Webb (2012). The Untouchables. Dublin: Penguin Ireland. ISBN 978-1-84488-277-9.
- Ross, Shane (2020). In Bed With The Blueshirts. London: Atlantic Books. ISBN 978-1-83895-291-4.
- Ross, Shane (2022). Mary Lou McDonald: A Republican Riddle. London: Atlantic Books. ISBN 9781838955892.

Political offices
Preceded by Paschal Donohoe	Minister for Transport, Tourism and Sport; 2016–2020	Succeeded by Eamon Ryan

Dáil	Election	Deputy (Party)	Deputy (Party)	Deputy (Party)	Deputy (Party)	Deputy (Party)	Deputy (Party)	Deputy (Party)
2nd	1921	Thomas Kelly (SF)	Daniel McCarthy (SF)	Constance Markievicz (SF)	Cathal Ó Murchadha (SF)	4 seats 1921–1923		
3rd	1922	Thomas Kelly (PT-SF)	Daniel McCarthy (PT-SF)	William O'Brien (Lab)	Myles Keogh (Ind.)	4 seats 1921–1923		
4th	1923	Philip Cosgrave (CnaG)	Daniel McCarthy (CnaG)	Constance Markievicz (Rep)	Myles Keogh (Ind.)	Cathal Ó Murchadha (Rep)	Michael Hayes (CnaG)	Peadar Doyle (CnaG)
4th	1923 by-election	Philip Cosgrave (CnaG)	Daniel McCarthy (CnaG)	Constance Markievicz (Rep)	Myles Keogh (Ind.)	Cathal Ó Murchadha (Rep)	Hugh Kennedy (CnaG)	Peadar Doyle (CnaG)
4th	March 1924 by-election	James O'Mara (CnaG)	Daniel McCarthy (CnaG)	Constance Markievicz (Rep)	Myles Keogh (Ind.)	Cathal Ó Murchadha (Rep)	Hugh Kennedy (CnaG)	Peadar Doyle (CnaG)
4th	November 1924 by-election	James O'Mara (CnaG)	Daniel McCarthy (CnaG)	Constance Markievicz (Rep)	Myles Keogh (Ind.)	Cathal Ó Murchadha (Rep)	Seán Lemass (SF)	Peadar Doyle (CnaG)
4th	1925 by-election	James O'Mara (CnaG)	Thomas Hennessy (CnaG)	Constance Markievicz (Rep)	Myles Keogh (Ind.)	Cathal Ó Murchadha (Rep)	Seán Lemass (SF)	Peadar Doyle (CnaG)
5th	1927 (Jun)	James Beckett (CnaG)	Vincent Rice (NL)	Constance Markievicz (FF)	Myles Keogh (Ind.)	Thomas Lawlor (Lab)	Seán Lemass (FF)	Peadar Doyle (CnaG)
5th	1927 by-election	James Beckett (CnaG)	Vincent Rice (NL)	Thomas Hennessy (CnaG)	Myles Keogh (Ind.)	Thomas Lawlor (Lab)	Seán Lemass (FF)	Peadar Doyle (CnaG)
6th	1927 (Sep)	James Beckett (CnaG)	Robert Briscoe (FF)	Thomas Hennessy (CnaG)	Myles Keogh (CnaG)	Frank Kerlin (FF)	Seán Lemass (FF)	Peadar Doyle (CnaG)
7th	1932	James Beckett (CnaG)	Robert Briscoe (FF)	Thomas Hennessy (CnaG)	Myles Keogh (CnaG)	James Lynch (FF)	Seán Lemass (FF)	Peadar Doyle (CnaG)
8th	1933	James Beckett (CnaG)	Robert Briscoe (FF)	James McGuire (CnaG)	Thomas Kelly (FF)	James Lynch (FF)	Seán Lemass (FF)	Peadar Doyle (CnaG)
9th	1937	Myles Keogh (FG)	Robert Briscoe (FF)	Thomas Lawlor (Lab)	Thomas Kelly (FF)	Joseph Hannigan (Ind.)	Seán Lemass (FF)	Peadar Doyle (FG)
10th	1938	James Beckett (FG)	Robert Briscoe (FF)	James Lynch (FF)	Thomas Kelly (FF)	Joseph Hannigan (Ind.)	Seán Lemass (FF)	Peadar Doyle (FG)
10th	1939 by-election	John McCann (FF)	Robert Briscoe (FF)	James Lynch (FF)	Thomas Kelly (FF)	Joseph Hannigan (Ind.)	Seán Lemass (FF)	Peadar Doyle (FG)
11th	1943	Maurice Dockrell (FG)	Robert Briscoe (FF)	James Lynch (FF)	James Larkin Jnr (Lab)	John McCann (FF)	Seán Lemass (FF)	Peadar Doyle (FG)
12th	1944	Maurice Dockrell (FG)	Robert Briscoe (FF)	James Lynch (FF)	James Larkin Jnr (Lab)	John McCann (FF)	Seán Lemass (FF)	Peadar Doyle (FG)
13th	1948	Constituency abolished. See Dublin South-Central, Dublin South-East and Dublin South-West.						

Dáil	Election	Deputy (Party)	Deputy (Party)	Deputy (Party)	Deputy (Party)	Deputy (Party)
22nd	1981	Niall Andrews (FF)	Séamus Brennan (FF)	Nuala Fennell (FG)	John Kelly (FG)	Alan Shatter (FG)
23rd	1982 (Feb)	Niall Andrews (FF)	Séamus Brennan (FF)	Nuala Fennell (FG)	John Kelly (FG)	Alan Shatter (FG)
24th	1982 (Nov)	Niall Andrews (FF)	Séamus Brennan (FF)	Nuala Fennell (FG)	John Kelly (FG)	Alan Shatter (FG)
25th	1987	Tom Kitt (FF)	Séamus Brennan (FF)	Anne Colley (PDs)	John Kelly (FG)	Alan Shatter (FG)
26th	1989	Tom Kitt (FF)	Séamus Brennan (FF)	Nuala Fennell (FG)	Roger Garland (GP)	Alan Shatter (FG)
27th	1992	Tom Kitt (FF)	Séamus Brennan (FF)	Liz O'Donnell (PDs)	Eithne FitzGerald (Lab)	Alan Shatter (FG)
28th	1997	Tom Kitt (FF)	Séamus Brennan (FF)	Liz O'Donnell (PDs)	Olivia Mitchell (FG)	Alan Shatter (FG)
29th	2002	Tom Kitt (FF)	Séamus Brennan (FF)	Liz O'Donnell (PDs)	Olivia Mitchell (FG)	Eamon Ryan (GP)
30th	2007	Tom Kitt (FF)	Séamus Brennan (FF)	Alan Shatter (FG)	Olivia Mitchell (FG)	Eamon Ryan (GP)
30th	2009 by-election	Tom Kitt (FF)	George Lee (FG)	Alan Shatter (FG)	Olivia Mitchell (FG)	Eamon Ryan (GP)
31st	2011	Shane Ross (Ind.)	Peter Mathews (FG)	Alan Shatter (FG)	Olivia Mitchell (FG)	Alex White (Lab)
32nd	2016	Constituency abolished. See Dublin Rathdown, Dublin South-West and Dún Laoghaire.				

Dáil	Election	Deputy (Party)	Deputy (Party)	Deputy (Party)	Deputy (Party)
32nd	2016	Catherine Martin (GP)	Shane Ross (Ind.)	Josepha Madigan (FG)	3 seats 2016–2024
33rd	2020	Catherine Martin (GP)	Neale Richmond (FG)	Josepha Madigan (FG)	3 seats 2016–2024
34th	2024	Sinéad Gibney (SD)	Neale Richmond (FG)	Maeve O'Connell (FG)	Shay Brennan (FF)
