= Tham Nguyen =

Irish weightlifter (born 1996)

Tham Nguyen Gough
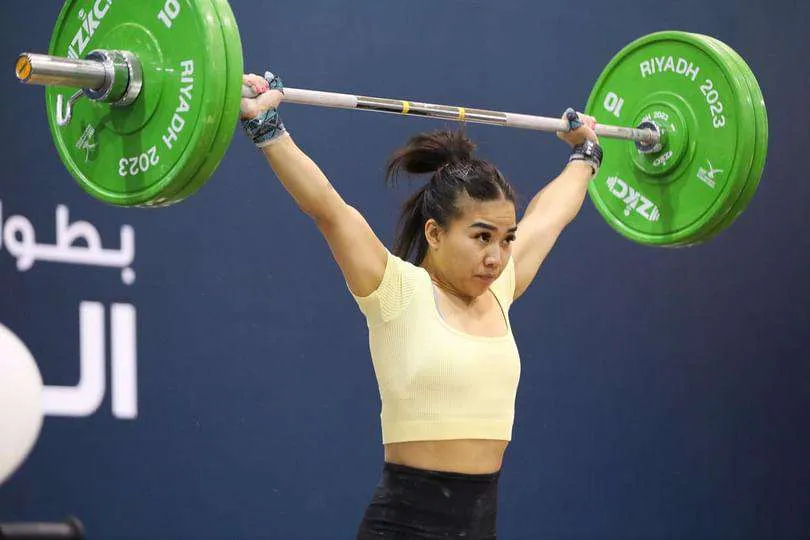
- Nguyen training in the 2023 World Weightlifting Championships training hall

Personal information
- Nickname: Thammy
- Nationality: Irish
- Born: Nguyễn Thẩm; 15 September 1996 (age 29) Vietnam
- Education: Portobello Institute (BSc)
- Height: 1.47 m (4 ft 10 in)
- Weight: 49.00 kg (108 lb)

Sport
- Country: Ireland
- Sport: Weightlifting
- Event: 49 kg
- Coached by: Mohamed Faizal Baharom, Beata Jung

Achievements and titles
- Personal bests: Snatch: 76 kg (2023, NR); Clean and jerk: 98 kg (2023, NR); Total: 173 kg (2023, NR)
Medal record
Women's weightlifting
Representing Ireland
European Championships
Bronze medal – third place	2023 Yerevan	49 kg C&J
Bronze medal – third place	2024 Sofia	49 kg total
Bronze medal – third place	2024 Sofia	49 kg C&J

Tham "Thammy" Nguyen Gough (née Nguyen; /θjæm wɪn/; Vietnamese: Nguyễn Thẩm, [ŋwiən˦ˀ˥˦ tʰaːm˧˩]; born 15 September 1996) is an Irish retired weightlifter who became the first Irish weightlifter to win a senior medal at the European Weightlifting Championships.

Immigrating to Ireland from Vietnam at an early age, Nguyen and her family experienced hardships in the country. She moved to different towns before settling in Clarehall, where she then discovered Olympic weightlifting in a gym. She supported her weightlifting career financially through her businesses.

Nguyen first competed at the European Junior & U23 Weightlifting Championships in 2015 as the first woman to represent Ireland at the competition. She also became the first Irish woman ever to compete at the World Weightlifting Championships in that same year. After a break of eight years, she competed at the 2023 European Weightlifting Championships and lifted 98 kilograms in the clean and jerk, which earned the first medal ever for the nation with a bronze. She earned the first total medal for the nation at the following European Championship. She retired in April 2024 after narrowly failing to qualify for the 2024 Summer Olympics.

== Early life ==
Nguyễn Thẩm was born on 15 September 1996 in Vietnam to Lai and Thuy Nguyen. She, her parents, and her brother Nhat immigrated to Ireland in 2003, when she was six years old. She and her father arrived first, and her brother and mother followed the next year. They lived in Belturbet, then Santry, before settling in Clarehall. She said that life was hard and that sometimes her family could not afford food.

Nguyen's father's interest in sports influenced Nguyen and her brother to pursue athletic careers. She was active growing up, and pursued Irish dancing. Her parents opened a Chinese takeaway in 2012 to support the family, and Nguyen and her brother manage it from time to time. She started going to the gym at sixteen years of age, and after speaking to a young woman who participated in CrossFit, she joined a CrossFit gym. She was persuaded to try weightlifting by a gym coach who saw her performance.

== Career ==
=== 2015–2016 ===
After her first competition, she qualified for the 2015 European Junior & U23 Weightlifting Championships competing in the women's 53 kg category being the first woman to represent Ireland at the competition. She finished eighth overall. The same year, she competed at the 2015 World Weightlifting Championships – being the first Irish female weightlifter to compete at the World Weightlifting Championships. She placed 35th in the women's 48 kg category.

The following year, Nguyen competed at the 2016 European Weightlifting Championships placing 21st in the women's 53 kg category. She then competed at the 2016 Junior World Weightlifting Championships, where she placed 15th in the same category.

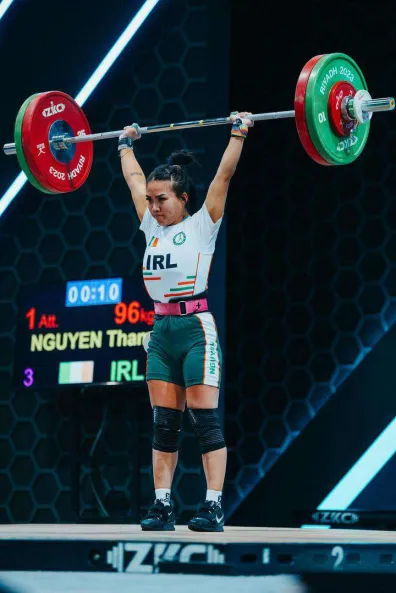
Nguyen clean and jerking 96 kilograms at the 2023 World Weightlifting Championships, held in Riyadh, Saudi Arabia.

=== 2022–2023 ===
After seeing her brother, Nhat, at the 2020 Summer Olympics opening ceremony in Tokyo, Japan, she said she "remembered the goal she set for herself many years ago", saying she felt disheartened when she did not achieve the goal. After remembering the goal she set, she went back to training. Through her brother's contacts, she got in touch with 2004 Olympian Mohamed Faizal Baharom who competed for Malaysia in January 2022 to help with her training. She brought him to Dublin and praised him for her steady improvement in the sport from his coaching. She also trains with Beata Jung, the coach of the Irish national team.

Her first competition in six years was the 2022 World Weightlifting Championships, she placed 20th. She snatched 73 kg, and clean and jerked 93 kg for a 166 kg total. The following year, she competed at the 2023 European Weightlifting Championships, snatching a competition best of 75 kg and clean and jerking another competition best of 98 kg becoming the first Irish weightlifter to win a senior European Weightlifting Championships medal, a bronze, and becoming the first Irish female weightlifter to lift twice her own weight. She finished ninth overall in the women's 49 kg category. She then competed at the 2023 World Weightlifting Championships, competing in the same category, snatching 76 kg, a new national record, and clean and jerking 96 kg, with a 172 kg total placing 19th.

=== 2024 ===
At the 2024 European Weightlifting Championships held in Sofia, Bulgaria, she lifted 74 kilograms in the snatch, placing sixth. She then clean and jerked 95 kilograms, earning a total of 169 kilograms, earning bronze for both lifts and earning the first total medal for the nation. After her bronze medal win at the championships, she announced on Instagram that she would be retiring after the nearing IWF World Cup held in Thailand in April, stating that she is "emotionally, mentally, physically, and financially exhausted" due to balancing her sporting career and her businesses, saying it would be her last Europeans for the national team to focus more on her other future endeavors.

Two months later, she competed at the 2024 IWF World Cup held in Phuket, Thailand. She lifted 70 kilograms in the snatch and clean and jerked 96 kilograms for a total of 166 kilograms. After the competition, she retired from professional weightlifting to focus on her children. She stated that she's "happy about retiring," saying that she hopes that other young lifters in Ireland will be encouraged about the sport.

== Major results ==
Year	Venue	Weight	Snatch (kg)				Clean & Jerk (kg)				Total	Rank
Year	Venue	Weight	1	2	3	Rank	1	2	3	Rank	Total	Rank
Representing (Republic of Ireland) Ireland
World Championships
2015	Houston, United States	48 kg	~~54~~	54	57	36	~~72~~	73	~~76~~	36	130	35
2022	Bogotá, Colombia	49 kg	73	~~75~~	~~75~~	24	~~93~~	93	~~95~~	23	166	20
2023	Riyadh, Saudi Arabia	49 kg	~~74~~	74	76	19	96	~~98~~	~~100~~	21	172	19
European Championships
2016	Førde, Norway	53 kg	60	~~62~~	~~62~~	23	72	~~75~~	~~75~~	22	132	21
2023	Yerevan, Armenia	49 kg	73	75	~~77~~	6	96	~~98~~	98	3rd place, bronze medalist(s)	173	5
2024	Sofia, Bulgaria	49 kg	~~74~~	~~74~~	74	6	~~95~~	95	~~97~~	3rd place, bronze medalist(s)	169	3rd place, bronze medalist(s)
Junior World Championships
2016	(Georgia (country)) Tbilisi, Georgia	53 kg	61	64	66	15	75	78	82	14	148	15
European Junior Championships
2015	Klaipėda, Lithuania	53 kg	54	~~57~~	57	8	72	~~75~~	75	8	132	8

== Personal life ==
Nguyen has a brother named Nhat Nguyen who is an international badminton player who competed at the Summer Olympics representing Ireland.

Nguyen is married to Mark Gough, a business owner, with whom she has two children named Lilly and Marc. After her marriage, she adopted the name Tham Nguyen Gough, being nicknamed Thammy. She owns and operates two salons and a clothing brand to support her weightlifting career. She and her husband have opened up a CrossFit gym in Baldoyle.
