= Marcus Evans =

British football businessman (born 1963)

- Born: Marcus Paul Bruce Evans; 18 August 1963 (age 63); Hammersmith, London, England
- Occupation: Businessman
- Known for: Former ownership of Ipswich Town F.C.
- Spouse: (married 1991)
- Children: 3; including Tallulah
- Parent(s): Nigel Bruce Charles Evans and Janita Evans (nee Williamson)

Marcus Paul Bruce Evans (born 18 August 1963) is an English businessman. He is originally from Walsham-le-Willows, near Bury St Edmunds in Suffolk, but grew up near Wimbledon, London. He founded his company, Marcus Evans, in 1983. The group organises live business, sports and entertainment events around the world. Its global regional head offices are in Dublin, Chicago, and APAC – Kuala Lumpur.

Evans is best known for being the former chairman and owner of Ipswich Town F.C., which he bought in December 2007. He remained the owner for over 13 years before selling the club to a new U.S. consortium in April 2021. Evans himself has maintained a low public profile throughout his professional career, with limited photos and interviews of him available online.

== Career ==
According to Companies House, Evans started his first firm, Associated Promotions, in 1983 when corporate hospitality was a relatively new market. By 1992 he had renamed his company The Hospitality Group (THG Sports Tours). That same year, he bought into a clothing and gifts company, Castle Mills International, but sold it to investor Brian Rousell within a year. THG Sports Tours is now part of the wider Marcus Evans Group. In 1994, he paid £325,000 for a stake of just under 5 percent in the electronics firm Ross Group, where he was appointed Chief Executive. In 1999, he was reportedly removed as CEO after a shareholder coup. In 2004, Evans made an unsuccessful £700+ million offer for the Daily Mirror, followed by another rejected offer of £550+ million in 2006.

=== 2007 Rugby World Cup ===
In June 2007, the organizers of the Rugby World Cup failed to secure exclusive control over corporate hospitality at the event. In a ruling, the Paris Commercial Court awarded Marcus Evans the right to run hospitality packages without the approval of the organizing committee.

Marcus Evans won his case after arguing that the Hospitality Group's packages included receptions before and after the matches, but not tickets to see them. This claim was contested by the organizing committee. However, despite taking The Hospitality Group to the highest appeal courts in France, in 2008 THG Group won its case in the courts.

=== 2012 Olympic Games (London) ===
In 2007, The Olympic Council of Ireland (OCI) officially appointed the THG Sports Tours, another company owned by Marcus Evans (and part of the Marcus Evans Group), as its official ticketing agency for the 2012 Olympic Games in London.

Subsequently, both the Greek Olympic organization and the Maltese Olympic organization have appointed THG Sports Tours as their agents.

== Ipswich Town ==
In 2007, Ipswich Town Football Club announced that Marcus Evans would be buying a controlling stake in the club subject to contracts, pending due diligence and shareholder approval. The deal saw Evans purchase Ipswich Town's £32 million debts with Aviva (Norwich Union) and Barclays Bank. The official announcement did not state the terms of this deal, though various unsourced media reports speculated that he paid anything between 20 pence to £1 for the club. He injected £12 million into the club and gained a controlling 87.5% stake, with existing shareholders retaining a 12.5% stake. The deal was finalised following an EGM on 17 December 2007.

When Marcus Evans took over the club in 2007, the club was £32m in debt to Evans. Due to the club paying Evans around 5.4% interest on the debt every year, club accounts in 2012 showed that the figure had more than doubled to £67m and he hadn't converted any of it to equity.

After 11 years of Evans's ownership, the club finished bottom of the Championship in 2019 and was relegated to League One, the third tier of English football, for the first time since 1957. Following relegation the club's debt, which is owned exclusively to Evans, rose from £95.5m to £96.3m.

Following relegation, discontent over Evans's ownership began to grow within the club's fanbase, which led to the popular fan group 'Blue Action' staging several demonstrations against both Evans and club manager Paul Lambert during the 2020–21 season. Notably on 15 February 2021, several fans defied COVID-19 rules and staged a protest outside the club's training ground, with many throwing flares onto the ground and chanting for Lambert to be dismissed. Lambert would leave the club at the end of the month by mutual consent, with Paul Cook appointed soon after.

On 7 April 2021, Evans officially sold the club to US investment group Gamechanger 20 Limited and agreed to write off the majority of the club's debt owed to him in the process. As part of the deal, Evans took up a 5% stake in Gamechanger 20 Ltd, with the Three Lions fund (managed by Brett Johnson, Berke Bakay, and Mark Detmer) owning a further 5% stake, and the remaining 90% of the group owned by the US investment fund ORG. Evans confirmed in his final statement that despite retaining a stake in the club, he would no longer be involved in the day-to-day running of the club. In May 2025, the club announced that they had purchased Evans' remaining shares in the club (which had already been dilited to 1% the previous year), marking an end to his involvement in the club.

== Marcus Evans Group ==
Marcus Evans Group was founded in 1983. It employs over 3000 staff and has around 56 offices globally. The group produces high-end and sector-focused business events, summits, and conferences, in a number of business sectors.

In March 2026, Marcus Evans, Inc. agreed to pay $2,857,081.33 to resolve allegations by the U.S. Department of Justice that it had improperly obtained a Paycheck Protection Program (PPP) loan in 2021 for which it was not eligible. The settlement resolved claims brought under the False Claims Act; Marcus Evans did not admit liability.

In February 2026, Raptor Trading Systems, Inc. filed suit against Marcus Evans (NA) Ltd., Marcus Evans Conferences Ltd., and Marcus Evans Inc. in New York Supreme Court, alleging that Marcus Evans entities had misrepresented their relationships with major investment firms in a solicitation email. The plaintiff voluntarily discontinued the case in March 2026.

== Television ==
In 2004, Evans set up Marcus Evans Television with ex BBC Producer Mark Wilkin. The TV division created a range of "The World of ...." series. The magazine program The World of Football enjoyed the most success and was broadcast in the UK by Sky and BBC and was licensed across most major global territories.

In 2012, World Productions became part of Marcus Evans Entertainment. World Productions have been making television drama for the last 20 years where they have produced critically acclaimed dramas including Line of Duty, The Bletchley Circle, The Fear, United, This Life, No Angels, Ballykissangel, Ultraviolet, Between The Lines, and Party Animals.

In 2017, ITV Studios took a majority stake in the television division.

== Politics ==
In 2007, a spokesman for the Liberal Democrats confirmed that the party received significant support from Marcus Evans Ltd to establish a national phone bank to promote the party in future elections.

Guest speakers at summit events run by the Marcus Evans Group have included: George H. W. Bush, 41st US President (1989–1993); Jeb Bush, Governor of Florida (1999–2007); Bill Clinton, 42nd US president, (1993–2001); Dick Cheney, 46th US Vice-President (2001–2009); Bill Frist, 18th Majority Leader, US Senate (2003–2007); Tony Blair, British Prime Minister (1997–2007) and Newt Gingrich, 58th Speaker of the US House of Representatives (1995–1999).

== Tax exile status ==
Companies House entry for Evans' first company Associated Promotions lists his address as in Bermuda. When he was a director of Ross Group, documents filed revealed that his contract as chairman required him to spend 60 days a year in the UK. Companies House lists his fifteen firms, including his core company The Marcus Evans Group, as all being registered in Bermuda. Marcus Evans is believed to be based in Ireland where his European headquarters are located, although he still owns his two homes in the UK (Kingston upon Thames and Chelsea).

Evans resigned all his UK-based directorships in 2000. However, he does appear on the UK Electoral roll at his London address for the years 2004–2005, and 2008. He bought the Trewarthenick Estate in Tregony, Cornwall for a reputed £9 million, which is currently being renovated.
