= Thomas Hayden (weightlifter) =

Irish weightlifter (1926–2018)

Personal information
- Born: 23 October 1926
- Died: 25 December 2018 (aged 92)

Sport
- Sport: Weightlifting

Thomas Hayden (23 October 1926 – 25 December 2018), better known as Tommy Hayden, was an Irish weightlifter who competed in the 1960 Summer Olympics. Hayden was a member of the Hercules Weightlifting Club from 1946 and later served as its President. He was a founding member of the Irish Amateur Weightlifting Association. He died in December 2018 at the age of 92.
