= Nhat Nguyen =

Irish badminton player

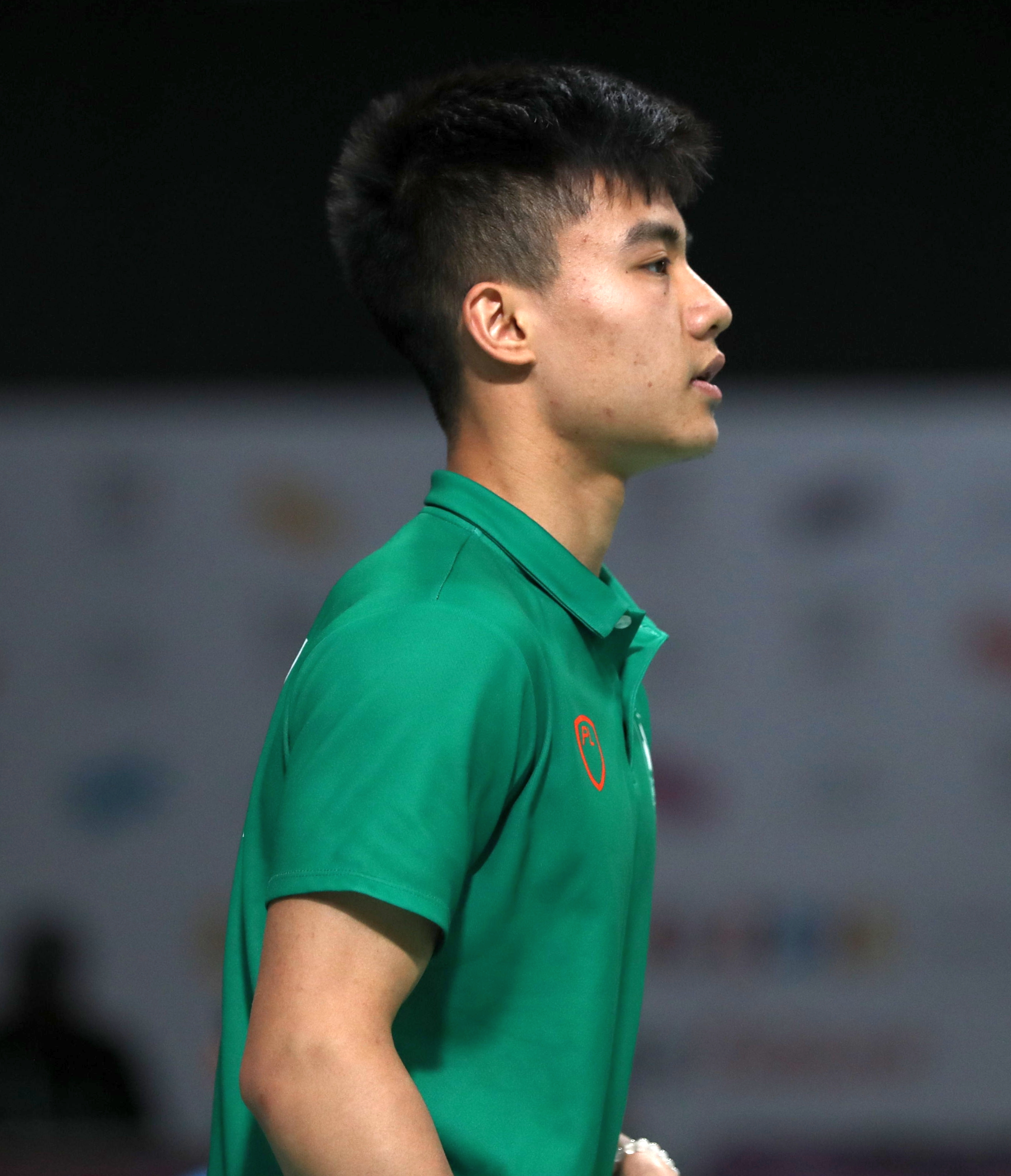
- Nguyen at the 2018 Summer Youth Olympics

Personal information
- Born: Nguyễn Nhật; 16 June 2000 (age 26) Hanoi, Vietnam
- Years active: 2014–present
- Height: 1.75 m (5 ft 9 in)

Sport
- Country: Ireland
- Sport: Badminton
- Handedness: Right
- Coached by: Iskandar Zulkarnain Zainuddin

Men's singles and doubles
- Highest ranking: 24 (MS, 9 June 2026); 114 (MD with Paul Reynolds, 21 June 2018)
- Current ranking: 28 (27 October 2026)
- BWF profile
Medal record
Men's badminton
Representing Ireland
European Junior Championships
Bronze medal – third place	2018 Tallinn	Boys' singles

Nhat Nguyen (Vietnamese: Nguyễn Nhật, [ŋwiən˦ˀ˥˦ ɲət̚˧˨ʔ˨]; born 16 June 2000) is a Vietnamese-born Irish badminton player.

== Biography ==
Nguyen was born in the suburbs of Hanoi, Vietnam and moved to Cavan, Ireland with his parents and older sister, when he was six years old. He began representing Ireland internationally when he received his Irish passport and citizenship in 2017; before that he was unable to travel outside Ireland to compete overseas. He was the gold medalist at the 2016 European U17 Championships in the boys' singles event, and also won bronze in the doubles event partnered with Paul Reynolds. In the same year, he clinched the men's singles title at the Irish National Championships. Nguyen won his first senior international title at the Polish International in the men's doubles event with Reynolds, and the men's singles title at the Welsh International after that. He also competed for Ireland in the men's singles events at 2019 European Games, the 2023 European Games, and the 2024 Summer Olympics.

He is the younger brother of Ireland's first European Weightlifting Championships medalist, Tham Nguyen Gough.

At the 2026 China Open, Nguyen became the first Irish badminton player to reach the quarterfinals of a BWF World Tour Super 1000 tournament, securing his spot by saving three match points to defeat Ayush Shetty.

== Achievements ==
=== European Junior Championships ===
Boys' singles
Year	Venue	Opponent	Score	Result
2018	Kalev Sports Hall, Tallinn, Estonia	(France) Christo Popov	7–21, 21–16, 18–21	Bronze

=== BWF International Challenge/Series (4 titles, 1 runner-up) ===
Men's singles
Year	Tournament	Opponent	Score	Result
2017	Welsh International	(India) Gurusai Dutt	21–16, 23–21	(gold) Winner
2017	Irish Open	(Germany) Alexander Roovers	19–21, 11–21	(silver) Runner-up
2023	Irish Open	(France) Alex Lanier	21–13, 21–19	(gold) Winner
2024	Irish Open	(Malaysia) Tan Jia Jie	22–20, 14–21, 21–19	(gold) Winner

Men's doubles
Year	Tournament	Partner	Opponent	Score	Result
2017	Polish International	(Republic of Ireland) Paul Reynolds	(Germany) Daniel Benz (Germany) Andreas Heinz	21–19, 25–23	(gold) Winner

BWF International Challenge tournament
BWF International Series tournament
BWF Future Series tournament
