= Welsh Triathlon =

Governing body of triathlon and multisports in Wales

- Sport: triathlon multisport
- Jurisdiction: Wales

Official website
- www.welshtriathlon.org
- (Wales)

Welsh Triathlon (Welsh: Triathlon Cymru) is the national governing body and membership association for triathlon, duathlon and other multisports in Wales. It is a member of the British Triathlon Federation, the other members being Triathlon England and Triathlon Scotland.

Welsh Triathlon aims to promote and develop the sports of triathlon and duathlon in Wales, and to encourage participation in them. Welsh Triathlon is developing a club structure for triathlon and duathlon and is responsible for competitions—including the Welsh Aquathlon Championships, the Welsh Duathlon Championships and the Welsh Triathlon Championships—and for team selection and training of the Wales representative squad for international competitions. It has 24 affiliated clubs.

GE Welsh Academy The aim of the academy is to put athletes on to the GB performance pathway who will go on to represent GB teams and to win medals at major competitions. The academy is primarily for youth and junior athletes and will be split into three squads; Talent, Development and Academy Member. The Academy Squad:

Talent Squad:

Alex Matchett, Iestyn Harrett, Josh Harris, Morgan Davies, Liam Lloyd, Megan Withers, Zoe Thomas

Development Squad:

Deri Stewart, Ieuan Cooke, Liam Bradley Michael Lewis, Sam Withers, Callum Beare, Ffion-Haf Harrett, Caitlin Thompson, Betsan Jenkins

Academy member:

Kieran Sinnett, Ellie Plumley, Alice Russell-Stretch, Kieran John
