= Snowsports Association of Ireland =

Governing body for snowsports in Ireland

The Snowsports Association of Ireland (SAI) is the National Governing Body for Snowsports in Ireland. It was founded as the Ski Association of Ireland in 1971 to promote skiing in Ireland. In 1991 in Luxembourg the SAI were founding members of the SES Ski Nations (Small European Ski) to support and promote the development of snowsports among smaller nations. The SAI is affiliated to the Federation Internationale de Ski (FIS), the International Biathlon Union, the World Snowboarding Federation, and since 1997 the Olympic Council of Ireland (OCI). Robert Norwood president of the SAI (and twice president of the Ski Club of Ireland) has sat on the OCI board since 2014 and is now second vice-president of the Olympic Federation of Ireland. The SAI works the OCI and Sport Ireland to facilitate the participation and preparation for Irish athletes at the Winter Olympics.
