= THG Sports =

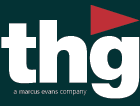
- Type: Subsidiary
- Industry: Hospitality & Leisure
- Founded: 1983-2019
- Headquarters: Chicago, 69 offices worldwide
- Products: Hospitality packages at leading sports events worldwide
- Number of employees: 3000
- Parent: Marcus Evans Group
- Website: www.THGSports.com

THG Sports (The Hospitality Group) was a provider of sports ticketing services and corporate hospitality programmes at sporting events around the world It has 69 offices globally and has around 3,000 employees who provide access to over 350 major events each year. It focuses primarily on: soccer, rugby, American football, athletics, horse racing, Formula One motor racing, and tennis.

The company was owned by the Marcus Evans group whose other sporting interests include ownership of Ipswich Town Football Club, English League champions in 1962.

== History ==
THG (The Hospitality group) was founded in 1983 as the division of the Marcus Evans Group whose goal it was to combine corporate hospitality with premier international sporting events. It has organised hospitality functions at distinguished events like the US Grand Prix, World Cup Soccer, Masters, US Open and the Final Four.

The company has steadily expanded; its core business diversifying into the provision of business intelligence through business conferences, summits, business training and the publication of comprehensive reports on strategic industry issues. In October 2000, the new corporate identity and image was announced as Marcus Evans.

== Offices ==
THG’s European headquarters are in London. Its North American headquarters are in Chicago, with offices in San Diego and Montreal.

== London Olympics 2012 and Olympic tickets ==
In 2010, The Olympic Council of Ireland (OCI) appointed THG as its official ticketing agent for the 2012 London Olympics and the 2014 Winter Olympics in Sochi.

In early 2011 following the announcement from the London Organising Committee of the Olympic and Paralympics Games (LOCOG), a division of THG – THG Sports Tours - was confirmed as Authorised Ticket Reseller (ATR) for three European Olympic Councils (Ireland, Greece and Malta) ahead of the London 2012 Olympic Games, taking place from 27 July to 12 August 2012 The company is one of several overseas official ticketing agencies which are currently in the spotlight due to a series of unfortunate incidents of fraudulent ticket touting on unauthorised websites.

Popular consumer watchdogs like the BBC's Moneybox programme have been strongly advising people to only deal with official ticket agencies as listed on the main London Olympics 2012 website.

== Football Association of Ireland (FAI) ==
Dublin’s Aviva Stadium on the site of the old Landsdowne Road Stadium was officially opened in May 2010 and is the venue for home matches for its main tenants, the Irish Rugby Union team and the Football Association of Ireland (FAI) team. THG is the sole hospitality provider for FAI games at the stadium.

== Controversies ==
THG CEO James Sinton was investigated in relation to a 2014 FIFA World Cup ticket scam. Once granted bail, Sinton left Brazil and never returned to face justice. THG has been reported in the UK press as offering amazing open corporate hospitality packages for the 2012 Olympics costing up to nearly £10,000 a head despite Prestige Ticketing having paid £75 million for the official in–venue corporate entertaining rights. London Olympic Committee lawyers are apparently looking to see whether or not the company is coming close to abusing its status as an official ticket reseller.

=== Rio 2016 Olympic ticketing scandal ===
During the 2016 Summer Olympics in Rio de Janeiro, Brazilian police arrested Kevin Mallon, an executive of THG Sports, in connection with an investigation into the alleged illegal resale of Olympic tickets allocated to the Olympic Council of Ireland. THG denied wrongdoing and said that the tickets seized by police were being held legally on behalf of authorised Irish reseller Pro10 Sports Management.

Brazilian police later said they had found email and text contact between Pat Hickey, then president of the Olympic Council of Ireland and an International Olympic Committee member, and Marcus Evans, owner of THG Sports, concerning Olympic ticket sales. Police said THG was not authorised to sell tickets for the Rio Games, while THG and Pro10 denied wrongdoing.

== Super Bowl ==
In 2011, THG celebrated its 20-year association with Super Bowl hospitality in Dallas, Texas.

== See also ==
- Marcus Evans
- 2016 Summer Olympics ticket scandal
- Thomas Bach
- Pat Hickey
