= John N. Ross =

Irish politician and lawyer (1920–2011)

Senator
- In office 14 December 1961 – 23 June 1965
- Constituency: Dublin University

Personal details
- Born: 17 May 1920 Cork, Ireland
- Died: 24 December 2011 (aged 91) Dublin, Ireland
- Party: Fine Gael
- Spouse: Ruth Isabel Cherrington (m. 1945)
- Children: 4, including Shane

John Nathaniel Ross (17 May 1920 – 24 December 2011) was an Irish Fine Gael politician and lawyer who served as a Senator for the Dublin University from 1961 to 1965.

He was originally from County Cork and married Ruth Isabel Cherrington. He was elected to Seanad Éireann as an independent member in 1961, by the Dublin University constituency. He subsequently sat as a Fine Gael member. He lost his seat at the 1965 election.

His son Shane Ross, is a former Senator for Dublin University, and was a TD for Dublin Rathdown from 2011 to 2020, and Minister for Transport, Tourism and Sport from 2016 to 2020.

== See also ==
- Families in the Oireachtas
