= All-Ireland League (association football) =

The All–Ireland League was a name given to a proposed all-Ireland association football league featuring teams from both the Republic of Ireland and Northern Ireland. The proposal was made in 2008, but was abandoned due to a lack of support from the authorities and clubs within the League of Ireland and the Irish Football League.

== History ==
Proposals for the league were spearheaded by Platinum One, a private events management company who met with six League of Ireland clubs that had grievances with the FAI regarding their participation agreement and the introduction of a wage cap. They also met with two Irish Football League clubs, Linfield and Glentoran. The proposal was abandoned in September 2008 with Platinum One chairman, Fintan Drury, concluding that it would "not be sensible" to take discussions on the proposed breakaway league any further. The idea never received the full backing of the FAI or the Irish Football Association, although FAI Chief Executive, John Delaney, clarified that FAI policy would be governed by the wishes of the clubs. Other concerns over the proposal included the forfeiting of European places, the jurisdiction the league would be under, the exclusion of clubs from the league and several potential problems that may have arisen with FIFA and UEFA. Three of the League of Ireland clubs originally involved in the proposal, Cork City, Drogheda United and Derry City, subsequently financially collapsed due to overspending and mismanagement, with the former pair entering examinership and the latter being evicted from the League of Ireland.

== Clubs ==
No definite list of clubs to be included was ever drawn up. Limerick 37 controversially looked set to be included ahead of more established League of Ireland sides.
