= J. J. Keane =

Gaelic footballer, track athlete and sporting administrator

Personal information
- Native name: Seán Seosamh Ó Céin (Irish)
- Born: John James Keane; 14 April 1871 Anglesboro, County Limerick, Ireland
- Died: 1 April 1956 (aged 84) Portobello, Dublin, Ireland
- Occupation: Corn merchant

Sport
- Sport: Gaelic football
Club
- Years: Club
- Geraldines
Club titles
- Dublin titles: 2
Inter-county
- Years: County
- 1898-1902: Dublin
Inter-county titles
- Leinster titles: 3
- All-Irelands: 3

John James Keane (14 April 1871 – 1 April 1956) was an Irish Gaelic footballer, track athlete and sports administrator. His championship career at senior level with the Dublin county team spanned five seasons from 1898 until 1902.

Born in Anglesboro, County Limerick, Keane was born to John and Ellen Keane (née Cook). He was educated locally before moving to Dublin where he worked as a corn merchant.

After moving to Dublin, Keane helped establish the Geraldines club in 1896. As well as being a founder-member he also became a regular member of the senior team and won back-to-back county football championship medals in 1898 and 1899.

Keane made his inter-county debut during the 1898 championship when he was selected for the Dublin senior team. Over the course of the next five seasons, he won three All-Ireland medals, beginning with back-to-back triumphs in 1898 and 1899, followed by a third and final championships in 1902. He also won three Leinster medals.

As a track athlete, Keane won the Irish 120 yards hurdles in 1900 before becoming one of the most effective sports administrators of the early part of the 20th century. He was chairman of the Athletic Council of the Gaelic Athletic Association from 1901 until 1922, when he became founding president of its successor, the National Athletic and Cycling Association (NACA). He also founded the Irish Olympic Council, becoming its first President and Ireland's first member of the International Olympic Committee. As NACA president he was appointed to the board of the International Amateur Athletics Federation (IAAF). He was heavily involved in the organisation of the three Tailteann Games, becoming overall director of the games in 1932.

Keane died in Dublin on 1 April 1956.

== Honours ==
Geraldines

- Dublin Senior Football Championship (2): 1898, 1899

Dublin

- All-Ireland Senior Football Championship (3): 1898, 1899, 1902
- Leinster Senior Football Championship (3): 1898, 1899, 1902
