= Triathlon England =

Sports governing body

- Sport: Triathlon; Multisport
- Jurisdiction: England
- Abbreviation: TE
- Headquarters: Michael Pearson East, Loughborough University, Leicestershire
- CEO: Andy Salmon

Official website
- www.triathlonengland.org
- (England)

Triathlon England is the national governing body and membership association for triathlon, duathlon and other multisports in England. It is a member of the British Triathlon Federation, the other members being Triathlon Scotland and Welsh Triathlon.

Triathlon England aims to promote and develop the sports of triathlon, duathlon and other multisports in England, and to encourage participation in them. Triathlon England has developed a club structure for triathlon and is responsible for competitions—including the Triathlon England National Championships and Regional Junior Series—and for team selection and training of the England representative squad for international competitions.
