= Descente =

Japanese sports clothing and accessories company

Descente Ltd.
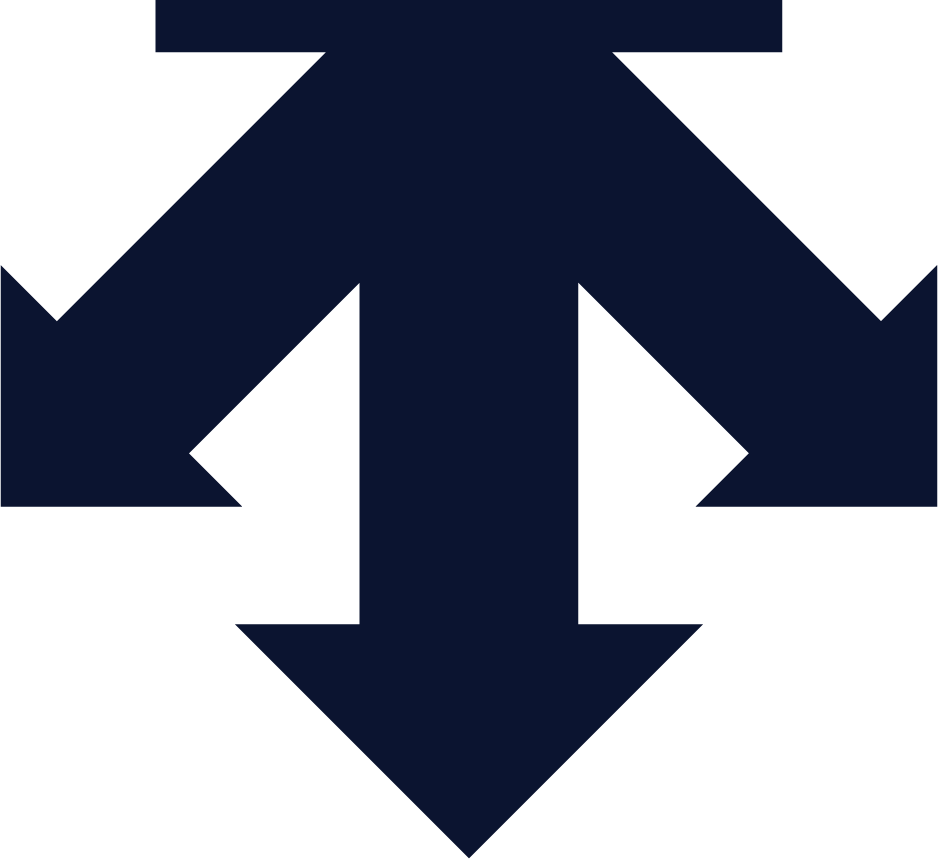

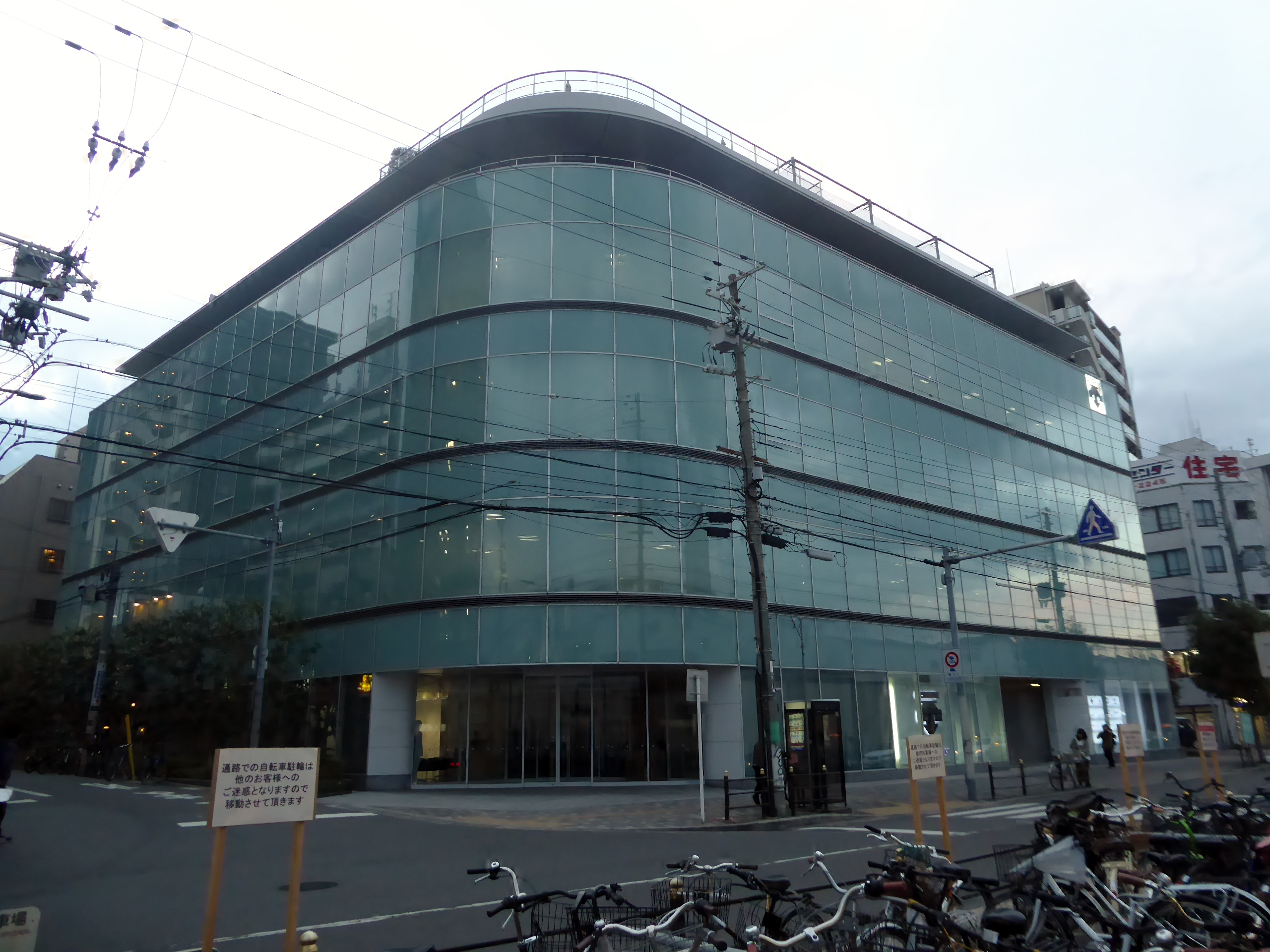
- Headquarters in Tennōji-ku, Osaka
- Native name: 株式会社デサント
- Type: Public K.K.
- Traded as: TYO: 8114
- ISIN: JP3548800006
- Industry: Apparel
- Founded: (February 1935; 91 years ago)
- Founder: Takeo Ishimoto
- Headquarters: Dogashiba, Tennoji, Osaka, Japan
- Area served: Worldwide
- Key people: Shuichi Koseki (President)
- Products: Sportswear; Sport accessories
- Revenue: ▲JPY 123.1 billion (FY 2014) (US$ 1.1 billion) (FY 2014)
- Net income: ▲JPY 6.5 billion (FY 2014) (US$ 59 million) (FY 2014)
- Number of employees: 1,839 (as of March 31, 2015)
- Website: descente.co.jp

Descente Ltd. (株式会社デサント, Kabushiki-gaisha Desanto) is a Japanese sports clothing and accessories company, first formed in 1935, when Takeo Ishimoto started the company in Osaka as Ishimoto Shoten. The company logo depicts 3 basic skiing techniques—traverse, schuss and side-slip. Descente owns a portfolio of 16 in-house, purchased and licensed brands, among them Descente, Shiseist, Arena (primarily in Japan and East Asia), Marmot and Srixon.

== History ==
The forerunner of the company, a men's retail store called Ishimoto Shoten, was founded in 1935. It started developing skiwear in 1954, and registered the Descente trademark in 1961. The "Demopants" ski pants style was launched in 1974, followed in 1979 by the "Magic Suit". A wearable heating system called the "Mobile Thermo" jacket was introduced in 1998.

In 2002, the company collaborated with Academy Award-winner art director and costume designer Eiko Ishioka in creating the Vortex suits and uniforms, used by the Japanese, Swiss, Spanish and Canadian teams competing in the 2002 Winter Olympics. Other developments since 2000 have included the Mizusawa Down range, the E-liner under-suit for ski and speed skating use, the ACXEL range of support bands and in 2012, Genome high performance compression wear.

The company won an ISPO Gold Medal for its ALLTERRAIN Transform Jacket in 2013.

== Sponsorships ==
=== Rowing ===
Descente have sponsored Cambridge University Boat Club in the Lightweight Boat Races since 2018.

=== Speed-skating ===
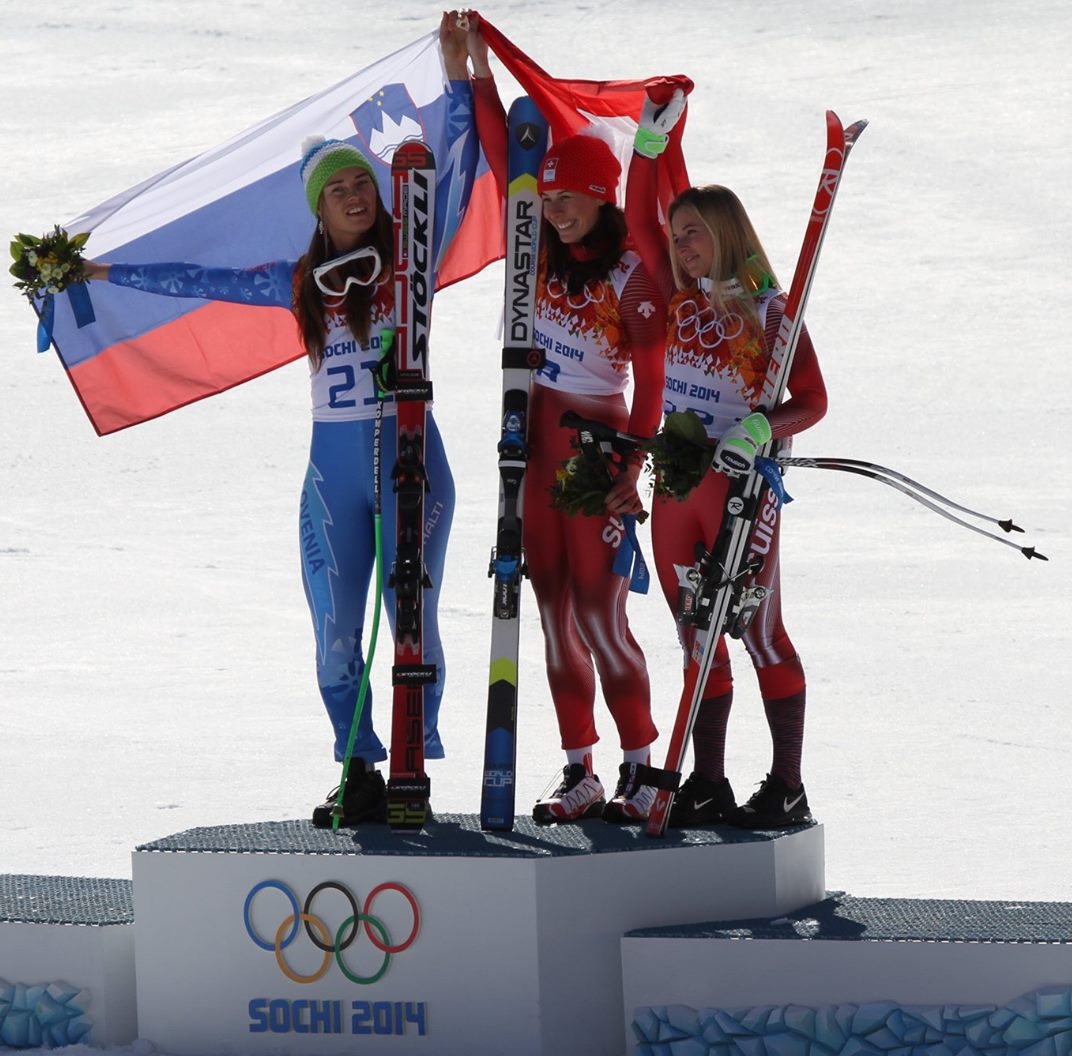
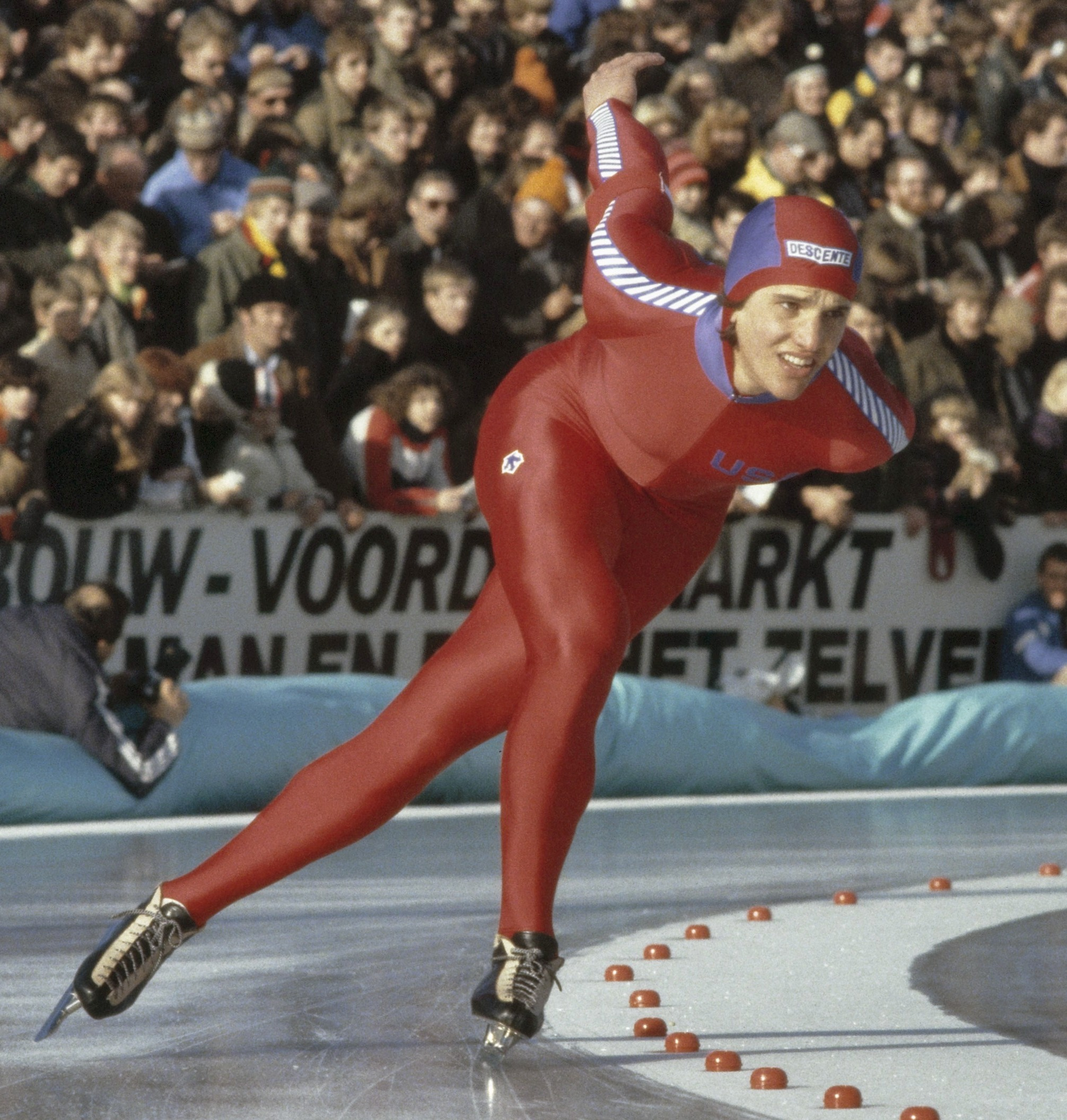
(Left): Dominique Gisin and Lara Gut wearing Descente ski suits at the 2014 Winter Olympics; (right): Eric Heiden wearing a Descente racing suit at the 1980 World Allround Speed Skating Championships for Men

The company sponsored the United States speed-skating team in the 1970s and 1980s, including Eric Heiden, who won five gold medals at the 1980 Winter Olympics wearing the gold Descente racing suit. It was also a supplier to the Canadian speed-skating team.

=== Skiing ===
The United States Ski Team, during the 1980s, and later, the Swiss alpine ski team was equipped with the company's skiwear.

=== Bobsled, Skeleton & Luge ===
Descente has equipped the German Bobsled, Skeleton & Luge Team as the main sponsor.

=== Cycling ===
Descente has equipped the 7-Eleven Cycling Team and Team CSC, two UCI World Tour competing teams.

=== Baseball ===
The company is the official apparel and uniform sponsor of the South Korea national baseball team having previously supplied South Korea's under-18 team.

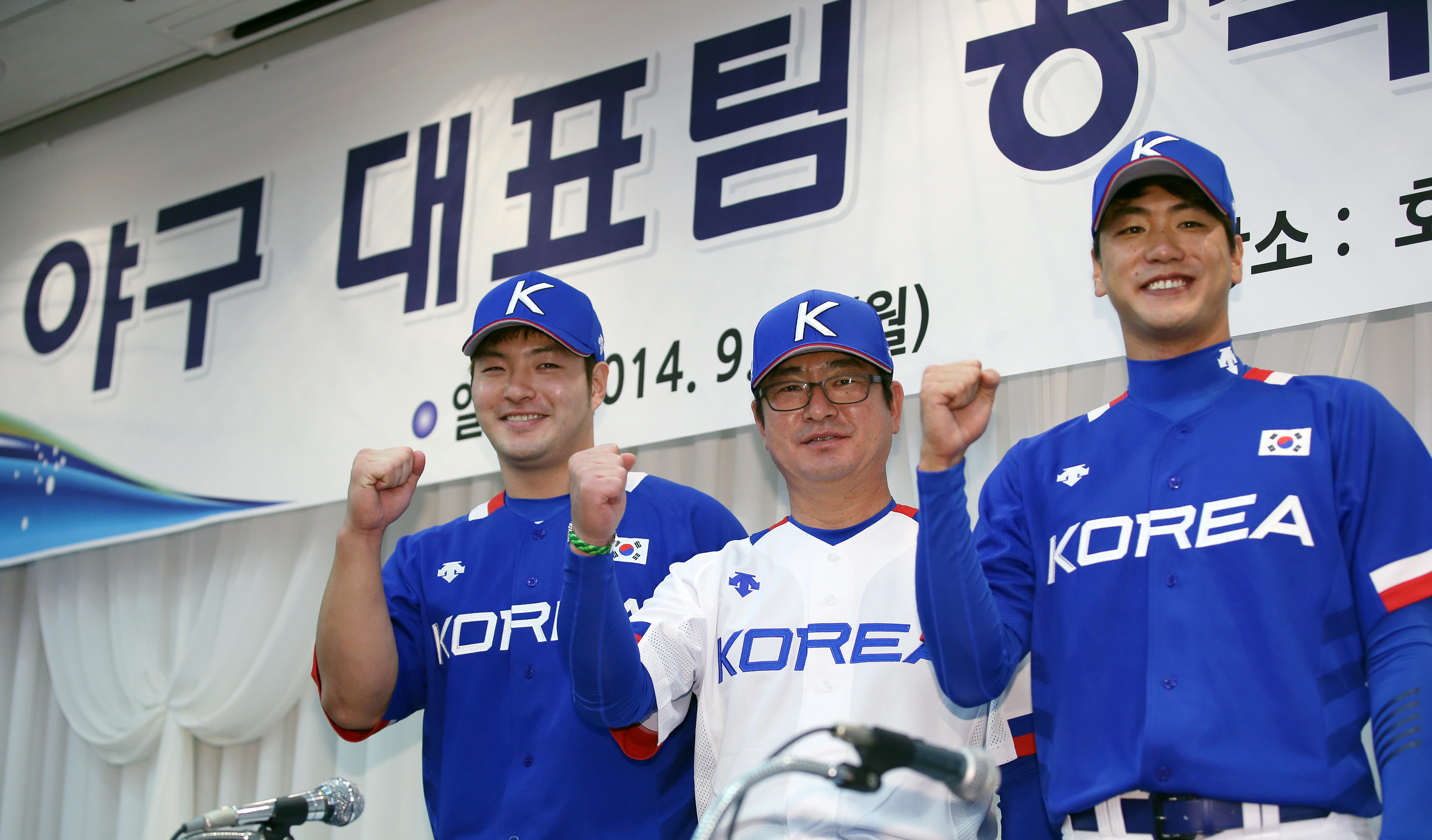
South Korea baseball team at a press conference before the 2014 Asian Games in Descente uniforms

=== Motorcycle racing ===
In February 2015, Yamaha Motor Racing, a MotoGP World Championship team, signed an Official sponsorship and Official Supplier agreement with Descente.

=== Triathlon ===
In April 2017, Descente became the Sports Apparel Sponsor to British Triathlon, supplying the Great Britain Elite and Age-Group Teams with competition, training and travel wear.
