= Weightlifting Ireland =

Irish sport organisation

Weightlifting Ireland, formally The Irish Amateur Weightlifting Association, is the governing body for the sport of weightlifting on the island of Ireland.

The Irish Amateur Weightlifting Association was founded in 1948 by members of the Hercules Club in Dublin, who had been refused entry to an Irish Championships being held in Belfast earlier that year by British Amateur Weightlifting Association members.

It is an affiliate member of the Olympic Federation of Ireland, and European Weightlifting Federation. Its headquarters is in Douglas, County Cork. The organisation is separate from the Irish Powerlifting Federation (IrishPF), the governing body for powerlifting and affiliate of the International Powerlifting Federation.

The organisation is supported by Irish Government funding through Sport Ireland. While the association has been represented at Olympic Games, as of April 2025, it does not have a high-performance unit.

== See also ==
- Thomas Hayden (weightlifter) - Olympian, and early pioneer of weightlifting in Ireland
