= Olympic Federation of Ireland =

National Olympic Committee for Ireland

- Country: Ireland
- Code: IRL
- Created: April/May 1920
- Recognized: 3 June 1922
- Continental Association: EOC
- Headquarters: Abbotstown, County Dublin, Ireland
- President: Sarah Keane
- Secretary General: Sarah O'Shea
- Website: olympics.ie

The Olympic Federation of Ireland (OFI; Irish: Cónaidhm Oilimpeach na hÉireann; IOC Code: IRL), called the Irish Olympic Council from 1920 to 1952, and the Olympic Council of Ireland from 1952 to 2018, is the National Olympic Committee (NOC) of Ireland. Athletes from Northern Ireland have the option of participating under its auspices or in the Great Britain and Northern Ireland Olympic Team. Its mission statement is "To manage and enhance the performance of Team Ireland at Olympic Games whilst developing the Olympic Movement in Ireland." In 2018 the Olympic Council of Ireland was renamed as the Olympic Federation of Ireland.

== History ==
The Irish Olympic Council was founded in 1920, while the Irish War of Independence was pitting the Irish Republic proclaimed by Sinn Féin against the Dublin Castle administration of the United Kingdom of Great Britain and Ireland. John J. Keane, who was the head of the athletics committee of the Gaelic Athletic Association, met Sinn Féin leaders Arthur Griffith and Michael Collins in Vaughan's Hotel, Parnell Square, in April to discuss the possibility of a separate Irish team at the 1920 Olympics in Antwerp. The founding Council members were mostly Irish republican or nationalist political leaders. Keane wrote to the Baron de Coubertin, who was sympathetic, but the Belgian organising committee deferred to the British Olympic Association (BOA), which took the unionist view that Irish competitors should be part of the British team. By August, Keane was proposing that a separate Irish delegation should march under the Union Jack, on the model of Finland at the 1912 Summer Olympics when part of the Russian Empire. The International Olympic Committee (IOC) decided to "suspend all decision until the moment when the Irish question would be solved politically". Keane applied again in April 1922, during the provisional administration that was preparing for the formal establishment of the Irish Free State that December. De Coubertin was worried that the Tailteann Games were intended to rival the Olympics, and the BOA's delegate was unsure of the political outlook in the buildup to the Irish Civil War. Keane allayed these worries such that the Irish Olympic Council was affiliated to the IOC on 3 June 1922.

Most sports affiliated to the Federation are all-island in scope. Two exceptions in 1922 were athletics and cycling, each of which had rival bodies; the prospect of Olympic competition precipitated their merging into a unified National Athletic and Cycling Association (NACA), which affiliated to the Council in 1924. The council has sent a team to all but one of the Summer Olympic Games since 1924. The 1936 Games were boycotted; this was the first Games after the IAAF's 1934 ruling on borders which restricted the NACA's jurisdiction to the Free State. In 1952, the Council changed its own name from "Irish Olympic Council" to "Olympic Council of Ireland" to reinforce its claim to represent the whole island of Ireland rather than merely the Republic. Its team competed as "Eire" in 1948 and "Republic of Ireland" in 1952 before reverting to its preferred name "Ireland" in 1956 after Lord Killanin secured the agreement of Avery Brundage. The OCI and BOA have an agreement that Northern Irish sportspeople may compete for either team.

The Federation has sent teams to most Winter Olympic Games since 1992. The Olympic Federation of Ireland is the new name for the Olympic Council of Ireland, since 15 September 2018.

=== 2016 ticketing controversy ===
On 5 August 2016, the day of the 2016 Summer Olympics opening ceremony, police in Rio de Janeiro arrested two people for attempted illegal resale of hundreds of tickets allocated to the OCI. One of the two was employed by THG Sports, which was the OCI's authorised ticket reseller (ATR) in 2012 but not 2016; the OCI denied any involvement. Shane Ross, the Minister for Transport, Tourism and Sport, promised a "robust inquiry". Pro 10 Sports Management, the OCI's 2016 ATR, said the man arrested was working as their agent to distribute tickets which had been paid for legitimately. On 17 August, Pat Hickey, the OCI president, was arrested in Rio in connection with the investigation. The issue, together with the allocation of tickets for other Olympic events, was investigated by a non-statutory inquiry headed by retired High Court judge, Mr Justice Carroll Moran. The "Moran report" was published in August 2017.

== Operations ==
The OFI has a small staff under a Chief Executive, and is based at Olympic House in Howth, County Dublin.

=== Officials ===
The offices of President and IOC delegate are honorary, as required by the Olympic Charter.

=== OFI President ===
Name	Term
John J. Keane	1922–1929
General Eoin O'Duffy	1929–1933
Colonel Eamon Broy	1933–1950
Lord Killanin	1950–1973
Patrick J. Carroll	1973–1975
Desmond O'Sullivan	1976–1989
Pat Hickey	1989–2016 (Note: Vice-president O'Brien became acting president when Hickey stood down temporarily while embroiled in allegations of reselling of Olympic tickets.)
Willie O'Brien	2016–2017(acting)
Sarah Keane	2017–2024
Lochlann Walsh	2024–present

=== Delegates at the IOC ===
Name	Delegate Term	Presidential Term	Honorary Life Member
John J. Keane	1922–1951	N/A	N/A
Lord Killanin	1952–1972	1972–1980	1980–1999
Kevin O'Flanagan	1977–1995	N/A	N/A
Pat Hickey	1996– (temporarily self-suspended)	N/A	N/A

=== Affiliated organisations ===
While the Olympic Charter mandates that the area of jurisdiction of a NOC must coincide with the limits of the country in which it is established and has its headquarters, it does not require this for the national federations of particular sports affiliated to the NOC. Many bodies affiliated to the OCI are organised on an all-island basis, and have selected competitors from Northern Ireland for the Olympics.

The following organisations are affiliated, some of which are very small and share an address at "Sport HQ" in Park West business park:

Organisation	Sport(s) or discipline(s)	Founded	Affiliated	First competed at Olympics
Irish Amateur Archery Association	archery		>1973	1976
Athletics Ireland	athletics		1969 (Note: Bord Luthchleas Éireann affiliation date.)	1924
Badminton Union of Ireland	badminton			2000
Basketball Ireland	basketball		1947	1948
Irish Bobsleigh and Skeleton Association	bobsleigh, skeleton			1992 (bobsleigh); 2002 (skeleton)
Boxing Ireland	boxing (amateur)		1924	1924
Irish Canoe Union	paddlesports (kayaking, Canadian canoe)		1964	1972 (kayak); 1992 (Canadian)
Irish Clay Target Shooting Association	shooting (Note: Golf and shooting each have two associations listed by the OCI, although the Olympic Charter states "An NOC shall not recognise more than one national federation for each sport governed by an IF". In each sport, both associations are separately affiliated to the relevant IF (the International Golf Federation and the International Shooting Sport Federation)) (shotgun)		1966	1968
Irish Curling Association	curling			
Cycling Ireland	cycle racing (road, track, MTB)		1966 (Note: Irish Cycling Federation affiliation date.)	1928 (road, track); 1996 (MTB)
Horse Sport Ireland	equestrianism (showjumping, dressage, eventing)		1950	1948 (show jumping); 1952 (eventing); 1988 (dressage)
Fencing Ireland	fencing		1946	1948
Football Association of Ireland	football (soccer)		1970	1924
Golfing Union of Ireland (GUI)	golf (men's) (Note: The GUI, the ILGU, and the Professional Golfers' Association (Irish Region) are co-ordinating Irish planning for golf at the 2016 Olympics;)			2016
Irish Ladies' Golf Union (ILGU)	golf (women's)			2016
Irish Gymnastics Ltd.	gymnastics		>1973	1996
Irish Olympic Handball Association	team handball		>1973	
Irish Hockey Association	field hockey		1949	2016
Irish Ice Hockey Association	ice hockey			
Ice Skating Association of Ireland	ice skating (figure skating, speed skating)			
Irish Judo Association	judo		1963	1964
Mountaineering Ireland	sport climbing	1971	2018	
Modern Pentathlon Association of Ireland	modern pentathlon			1980
Paralympics Ireland	Paralympic Games	1987		1988 (Note: 1988 Summer Paralympics)
Rowing Ireland	rowing		1948	1948
Irish Rugby Football Union	rugby sevens			NA
Irish Sailing Association	sailing		1947	1948
Snowsports Association of Ireland	snowboarding, skiing (alpine skiing, Nordic skiing)		1997	1998 (alpine); 2002 (Nordic); 2014 (snowboard)
Target Shooting Ireland	shooting (rifle, pistol)			1980 (pistol); 1996 (rifle)
Swim Ireland	aquatics (swimming, water polo, diving)		1924	1924 (water polo); 1928 (swimming); 1948 (diving)
Irish Table-Tennis Association	table tennis			
Irish Taekwondo Union	taekwondo			
Tennis Ireland	tennis			1924
Irish Triathlon Association	triathlon			2000
Volleyball Association of Ireland	volleyball		>1973	
Weightlifting Ireland	weightlifting		1960	1960
Irish Amateur Wrestling Association	wrestling (freestyle)		1948	1952

Notes:

Baseball Ireland was formerly affiliated to the OCI, but is no longer listed since baseball was removed from the list of Olympic sports after 2008.

== Social media ==
The OFI is present on social media, with the Press Office of the Committee running an official Facebook page, as well as Twitter and Instagram accounts. The OFI is also present on YouTube with its own channel.

== See also ==
- Paralympics Ireland – the National Paralympic Committee
- Ireland at the Olympics
