= FÁS expenses scandal =

2008 political scandal in Ireland

The FÁS expenses scandal happened in Ireland in November/December 2008. Significant public and political outcry was roused, and at least one senior figure of a government organisation resigned. The scandal first emerged in June 2008 when Dáil Éireann (the lower house of the Irish parliament) was told one morning by Leader of the Opposition Enda Kenny that gardaí were investigating the alleged misappropriate use of funds by a senior executive within FÁS. The director general of the FÁS, the training and employment agency, Roddy Molloy resigned late on 25 November after revelations that himself and fellow FÁS executives spent hundreds of thousands of euro belonging to the company on lavish holidays to the United States, which included first-class travel and expensive rounds of golf, including €643,000 over a period of four years on transatlantic travel for the purpose of promoting the Science Challenge programme and almost €48,000 in air fares for journeys undertaken by Molloy, sometimes accompanied by his wife. Just prior to this, Taoiseach Brian Cowen had publicly defended Molloy before his resignation, amidst increasing public outcry and calls for him to resign by TDs including the Fine Gael spokesperson for enterprise Leo Varadkar. The turning point proved to be an interview Molloy gave to the RTÉ Radio 1 show Today with Pat Kenny in which he grossly underestimated the tide of public opinion in his defence of his company's expenses. On 24 November, Molloy explained to Pat Kenny: "We broke no rules or regulations. At the time we were doing it, it was standard practice." The Oireachtas Public Accounts Committee investigated the affair and issued a report on 19 February 2009.

== Background ==
=== Shane Ross, Nick Webb and the Sunday Independent ===
The Sunday Independent broke the story on 23 November 2008 after an investigation by its business editor, Senator Shane Ross and fellow journalist Nick Webb. Documents were obtained by the duo under the Freedom of Information Act, 1997. Ross later discussed his findings on the current affairs television programme Questions and Answers. Ross and Webb would later win the Bord Gáis journalist of the year award for their scoop, as well as the TV3 story of the year award. "Wasters", a book exposing waste and cronyism in the public sector by Shane Ross and Nick Webb, was published by Penguin in October 2010.

=== RTÉ Radio 1 interview ===
Molloy was questioned on a number of issues relating to the expenses of FÁS in an RTÉ Radio 1 interview with Pat Kenny on 24 November 2008.

Asked about the FÁS official who, along with his wife, purchased business class tickets costing €12,021 for a three-week round-the-world trip that took in destinations as exotic as Frankfurt am Main, Tokyo, Honolulu and San Francisco before a flight back to Dublin via Frankfurt, Molloy confirmed he had signed the expense claim and that the official was at an event in Tokyo on official business associated with the World Skills competition and with the graduate programme FÁS operate in Japan. He claimed that the official "at his own expense, spent some time on the way back coming back through the US".

Quizzed on the necessity of FÁS's chairman, the trade union boss Peter McLoone, accompanying Molloy on a €7,300 per-person return business class flight to Orlando, Florida for a week-long stay, Molloy pointed out that the city "also happens to be very close to the NASA facility where the shuttle lands and takes off from". He then alluded to the special relationship he claims his organisation have built up with NASA over a number of years, a relationship which led to Irish students being given opportunities to work and develop their research skills within NASA. He summed up his view with the line: "I think anyone who knows Florida knows it's not just about Disney World."

Asked about the FÁS executives who billed the Irish taxpayer for pay-per-view movies ranging in price from $12.71 to $34.40 that they then watched in their US hotel rooms, Molloy compared the price of pay-per-view movies to "chickenfeed", asking the presenter "What's $10 for a movie?". When Kenny informed Molloy that his employers RTÉ did not cover pay-per-view movies in their expenses, Molloy hinted at an "oversight on our part" but reiterated his belief that NASA was a major US government agency and that to develop "relationships" with them was "not easy".

On FÁS's corporate affairs director Greg Craig's company credit card being used to cover a $410 bill at Solutions beauty and nail salon on West Cocoa Beach, Florida in August 2005 (later infamously linked with the politician Mary Harney), Molloy implied that the amount of money, "in terms of the total package, is very, very small". On the FÁS credit card used to pay $942.53 for Molloy to play a three-ball golf match at the Orlando Florida Grand Cypress Resort Golf club in January 2005, Molloy again defended himself by referring to his "developing relationships" policy. He then apologised for committing "a major sin".

Molloy was then questioned about the clocking up of almost €48,000 in business-class airfares, sometimes accompanied by his wife, over a four-year period. On the most recent of these in February 2008, they ran up an airfare bill of €7,500 for a return trip to the US east coast. In May 2007, the duo flew to New York at a cost of €6,655, both travelling business class. In November 2007 the pair made their return to New York and in doing so ran up airfares of €7,281. Also in 2007 they claimed FÁS expenses of €6,455 for a similar trip, travelling business class again. In June 2005, they visited Boston on a cheaper flight, costing €1,634 and prior to this in July 2004, the duo flew to Orlando at a cost of €9,648 for their business class fares. Molloy emphasised that this was not the "hellishly expensive" first class travel and that on occasions that his wife had travelled, there had been valid and "appropriate" reasons for this being so. These reasons, he suggested, were "to do with the kind of activities that were involved there", including a dinner involving the president of Ireland Mary McAleese and her husband. He then proposed that on such occasions he had traded down his travel "entitlement" (he alleged an entitlement to travel first class) to allow his wife to buy a ticket on the plane with the leftover money.

Finally Molloy was quizzed on the €500 glass barometer that a FÁS representative had purchased as a gift for the Irish Minister for Education Mary Hanafin on a visit to their US project. FAS then paid an extra €419 in postage costs to send it back to Ireland. Molloy did not have such detail with him at that time but described such gifts as of a "corporate" kind, usually consisting of items such as Waterford Glass crystal. He did suspect that the barometer was a "probably sizeable" corporate gift to the Minister from NASA but claimed a lack of knowledge due to not having the relevant information at hand."

=== Rody Molloy's resignation ===
Rody Molloy's resignation as director general of FÁS was announced on 25 November shortly before 23:00 by Tánaiste and Minister for Enterprise Mary Coughlan. In the aftermath, the Labour Party leader Eamon Gilmore said the rest of the board's situation was "untenable". Molloy said he would not appear before the Oireachtas Public Accounts Committee on 27 November to investigate the issues that cost him his job, with assistant director general, Christy Cooney, acting as accounting officer for the meeting instead. He also received €500,000 compensation for resigning. Molloy later claimed he was "afraid of flying". He was replaced by a new six-month interim director-general, Eddie Sullivan, a former secretary general with the Department of Finance who was previously commissioned by the government to report on the 2006 rape law controversy, medical card fees for doctors and data protection legislation. On 16 January 2009, it was reported that Molloy would receive €111,000 severance payments and full pension benefits despite his resignation.

=== Additional spending controversies ===
==== Croke Park controversy ====
Questions were also raised about Molloy's decision to move a jobs fair from the smaller RDS venue to the larger Croke Park stadium in Dublin. He described the catering facilities at the RDS as "unacceptable" in standard and price, before suggesting that children might be killed whilst crossing the road to obtain nutritional maintenance elsewhere and insisting that incoming Gaelic Athletic Association president Christy Cooney, an assistant director with FAS, was not involved in the move.

==== Astronaut video visit controversy ====
Nearly €30,000 was spent by FÁS on a film crew to capture the 2006 visit of US astronaut, Commander Eileen Collins, whom the agency invited to Ireland to promote a science project. €7,856 was incurred on the County Cork leg of Collins's visit, whilst €16,000 expenses arose from filming her tour of Dublin schools. Hiring the cameraman and equipment cost €5,900. Added to this €30,000 estimate was a €13,000 bill for the chauffeur-driven limousines hired for the drive around Ireland, availed of not only by the astronaut but also by some senior executives of FÁS.

== Individuals ==
=== Mary Hanafin ===
Mary Hanafin defended her involvement in the scandal by saying she was in the United States "to present certificates" to students at NASA headquarters.

=== Peter McLoone ===
The head of the FÁS board, Peter McLoone, denied that he had "turned a blind eye" to foreign travel expenses, saying he was "never aware" of any excess expenditure.

=== Rody Molloy ===
Rody Molloy is a career civil servant who was appointed as director general of FÁS eight years prior to his resignation. Before this, he had served in a number of government departments including Industry and Commerce, Department of the Taoiseach and Foreign Affairs, gaining much of his FÁS management skills at the Department of Enterprise, Trade and Employment where he received promotion to the level of assistant secretary. Molloy is originally from Birr, County Offaly (Brian Cowen's constituency) but resided in Maynooth, County Kildare at the break-out of the scandal. His communication skills led to high praise from the Taoiseach Bertie Ahern during the years of economic boom brought on by the Celtic Tiger. He once described his "principal interest in life" as GAA; an avid hurling fan he was overheard boasting to a Dáil committee that he had tickets to a game at Croke Park. He is married to Noreen, and has four children.

=== Mary Harney ===
In a Radio 1 interview on 27 November, Fianna Fáil TD Mary O'Rourke described Mary Harney's involvement in the scandal as "a load of hoo-hah". Health Minister Mary Harney has defended her use of expenses while on a FÁS trip to the US. On 28 November Mary Harney defended herself with the claim that she was "not on holiday", had not used public taxes for her own personal grooming, blamed the use of the government jet on the Taoiseach and had followed "advice" in claiming her expenses. When she admitted using her time in the United States to receive a visit from a relative, the Labour Party leader Eamon Gilmore asked her to resign.

== Outcome ==
In a statement released on 29 November, the Board of FÁS said they had assured the Minister for Enterprise, Trade and Employment of their determination to release "all matters of concern about past practice" to the public domain. The Public Accounts Committee is set to report on the scandal in 2009. Mary Harney's husband, the former FÁS chairman Brian Geogheghan, is amongst those to be interviewed about his expenditure by the Public Accounts Committee.

On the day prior to this, the Irish Times published a letter from FÁS instructor Niamh McCarthy telling of how she was instructed by a representative from FÁS that any student absent from class for a day, with or without a doctor's certificate, is to have 80 cents deducted from their €4 trainee weekly meal allowance.

=== Reaction ===
Michael Lillis, a former leading civil servant and diplomat, said Molloy "should not have been driven out" and that he "played an important part for a generation in developing the Irish economy".

== Report ==
A Public Accounts Committee report on the affair was released on 19 February 2009. It found that proper procurement protocols were not adhered to and standard foreign travel policy was not abided by FÁS, resulting in a loss to the Exchequer. It found that FÁS should not have paid for flights of former board members, journalists and spouses of executives, whilst costs in respect of ministers and civil servants should have been borne by the department.

The report said FÁS's expenditure of €35 million on advertising between 2003 and 2007 was carried out in "an unorthodox fashion from a procurement perspective".

== Sunday Independent once again exposes Molloy ==
In September 2009, the Sunday Independent reignited the FÁS controversy when it reported that Mr Molloy had had his pension topped up by Tánaiste Mary Coughlan.

The front-page story, written by the paper's chief reporter, Daniel McConnell, detailed how Mr Molloy's pension was added to by the tune of an additional four and a half years, bringing the overall value of his pension to over €4m. The matter was made worse as two senior ministers, Brian Lenihan and Mary Coughlan appeared to blame each other for the affair.

The following day at the FF party think-in at Athlone, Tánaiste Mary Coughlan defended the move to top up Mr Molloy's pension saying it was politically imperative to see a change of DG. The matter rumbled on for weeks with the Tánaiste initially stating she acted on legal advice and said she did so to avoid a lengthy court battle to remove Mr Molloy from his position. Taosieach Brian Cowen later admitted that in fact there had been no threat by Mr Molloy nor had legal advice been sought. The issue was further raised at the Public Accounts Committee where more damaging revelations emerged. There were calls for Ms Coughlan to resign her post. Coughlan would go on to lose her seat in the 2011 general election.

In November 2009, the Sunday Independent revealed how Catriona Ceitin exposed the top-up granted to Mr Molloy.

The enhanced severance packages offered to Secretaries General created much controversy and discussions over the following two years and in November 2011, it was announced that such severance deals would no longer be available in the future.
