= Triathlon Ireland =

Irish national governing body for triathlon sports

Triathlon Ireland (Irish: Trí-Atlan Éireann, formerly the Irish Triathlon Association, is the governing body of triathlon, and duathlon, on the island of Ireland. It was founded in 1984. Darren Coombes has been the CEO since 2020. The organisation is one of a number of governing bodies based in Sports Campus Ireland in Fingal. It joined the Olympic Federation of Ireland in 2000.

The organisation supports both able-bodied and parasports.

The organisation honours athletes of the year, and maintains a Hall of Fame, at their annual awards.

The Irish Triathlon calendar of events runs to 200 events annually.

== Adventure racing ==
Multisport races, with running, cycling and kayak stages in events like WAR (Wicklow Adventure Race) and Gaelforce West, are also regulated by the organisation. There are also a few longer international-style adventure races lasting 24 hours and 36 hours, events like Beast of Ballyhoura and Cooley Raid.
