= John Delaney (football administrator) =

Former Irish soccer administrator

Executive Vice-President, Football Association of Ireland
- In office 25 March – 28 September 2019

CEO, Football Association of Ireland
- In office December 2004 – March 2019

Personal details
- Born: 16 October 1967 (age 58) Waterford, Ireland
- Spouse: Emer Delaney (div. 2016)

John Delaney (born 16 October 1967) is a former Irish sports administrator. He was the chief executive officer of the Football Association of Ireland from March 2005 to March 2019, and executive vice-president of the organisation from March to September 2019. He agreed to a voluntary suspension of all duties in September 2019 following journalistic investigation into the financial management of the association.

== Early life ==
Born in Waterford, John Delaney is one of five children of Joe and Joan Delaney. His siblings are a brother, Paul, and three sisters, Joanne, Jane and Mary Pat. His family were removed to County Tipperary when he was about three, and he grew up later in the town of Tipperary. As a schoolboy he played Gaelic games as well as soccer, and lined out for St Michaels of Tipperary and Tralee Celtic of Kerry.

=== Business life ===
Delaney's early career was in business, beginning with a bakery in Tralee, and by 2002 he owned three companies in Waterford and had other business interests in Athlone. He sold a logistics business in 2002.

After studies at Waterford IT, Delaney qualified as a chartered accountant but as of September 2016 had not gone through the formality of joining Chartered Accountants Ireland (CAI).

== Career ==
John Delaney joined the board of directors of soccer club Waterford United in 1996, representing the club on the Football Association of Ireland (FAI) Senior Council, and in the League of Ireland.

In July 2001, he was elected treasurer of the FAI at the age of thirty-three, becoming the youngest person to hold the position. His father, Joe, had held the same position previously.

=== CEO and the Aviva Stadium ===
Delaney rose to prominence in the wake of the 2002 Keane Saipan saga, having emerged as the FAI's public figurehead during the affair. He became acting chief executive of the organisation in November 2004, after Fran Rooney's acrimonious departure, and was appointed to the role full-time in March 2005. In November 2006, his contract was extended to 2012. In July 2010, the FAI's Board of Directors agreed to extend his contract again, until 2015, and in July 2014 once more, this time to 2019.

The biggest project undertaken during Delaney's time in office was the expansion of the Irish Rugby Football Union stadium at Lansdowne Road to become the Aviva Stadium. Led by the IRFU with the active participation of the FAI, the project successfully delivered the stadium but while the State and the IRFU parts were financially as planned, the FAI found itself in severe debt. The main scheme to pay for the FAI elements of the work, the Vantage Club for high-income fans, massively under-delivered on advance ticket sales, partly due to the declining economic climate after the Irish financial crisis and partially to the over-pricing of the ticket offering.

=== FIFA payment revelation (2015) ===
After the Republic of Ireland's 2009 World Cup play-off defeat to France, Delaney claimed that FIFA had "offered [the FAI] a Fair Play award" and that the FAI had declined. He also stated that FIFA President Sepp Blatter was "an embarrassment to himself and an embarrassment to FIFA".

On 4 June 2015 — after Blatter announced his intention to hold an extraordinary general meeting following the arrests of seven FIFA officials on charges of racketeering, wire fraud and money laundering — Delaney revealed that the FAI had previously reached an agreement with Blatter for a payment in January 2010. The payment, reported to be €5 million, had taken place less than two months after the Republic of Ireland's controversial World Cup play-off defeat in 2009 and was described by Delaney as "a payment to the association not to proceed with a legal case".

An FAI statement later that day described the payment as a "[FIFA] settlement offer to avoid a long, costly and protracted legal case". FIFA confirmed that the organisation had "entered into an agreement with the FAI in order to put an end to any claims" against it but stated that the payment was a loan, granted for "the construction of a stadium in Ireland". According to FIFA, the loan to the FAI was to be paid back if Ireland qualified for the 2014 World Cup. After Ireland failed to qualify for the tournament in Brazil, the sum was written off by FIFA on 31 December 2014 "in view of the FAI's financial situation".

Jim Boyce, FIFA vice-president and former president of the Irish Football Association (IFA), called for an investigation into the payment saying "If this [payment] was authorised by the president of FIFA without the knowledge of the executive committee - this is something that has to be looked into".

=== 2012–2017 ===
In 2012 Delaney cut all FAI staff wages by 10% and announced he would do the same with his wages. However, in March 2019 it emerged that the FAI had awarded him a benefit-in-kind payment of €3,000 a month towards a house in Kilmacanogue, rented from Grainne Seoige. This outraged the staff as he already earned more than €300,000 annually more than most of them.

In 2012 the Republic of Ireland qualified for their first European Championship since 1988, under Giovanni Trapattoni, and in 2016 they also qualified for the same championship in France, under Martin O'Neill, and advanced to the last 16 of the tournament.

During the 2016 Summer Olympics ticket scandal, Brazilian police were given permission to seize Delaney's passport as part of an investigation into alleged ticket touting. Delaney resigned from the Olympic Council of Ireland's (OCI) executive committee and his position as the second vice-president of the OCI on 25 October 2016.

Delaney was elected to the executive committee of UEFA in April 2017.

=== Bridging loan (2019) ===
On 16 March 2019, the Sunday Times revealed that Delaney had provided the FAI with an undisclosed personal loan of 100,000 euros in April 2017 to prevent the association from exceeding its 1.5m euros bank overdraft. On 19 March, Sport Ireland – the agency that provides state funding to the FAI – confirmed it had sought "urgent clarification" from the board of the FAI on the John Delaney loan, confirming that the agency had not been notified in 2017 about a deterioration in the FAI's finances, as per the terms and conditions of its grant approvals.

On 23 March 2019 the FAI announced that Delaney had resigned as CEO, and would take up a newly created position of executive vice-president. This role would see Delaney reporting directly to the board of the FAI, rather than the CEO, and retain responsibility for international affairs, including all UEFA and FIFA matters and a proposed 'home nations' bid for the 2030 World Cup.

On 9 April 2019, Sport Ireland suspended and withheld future funding to the FAI due to the breach of the grant approval terms & conditions. On 10 April 2019, Delaney was part of an FAI delegation appearing before the Oireachtas Committee on Sport but, after reading a prepared statement, declined to take questions or speak any further. Ireland's state corporate watchdog, the Corporate Enforcement Authority (CEA), began legal proceedings against the FAI in May after the association acknowledged it had broken state funding rules. Auditors also said the association's accounts were not being properly kept, contravening two sections of Irish company law.

Delaney remained on gardening leave and held his new role until 28 September 2019 when the FAI announced that, following negotiations, he had resigned from the role of executive vice-president with immediate effect. Delaney resigned his UEFA executive committee membership in January 2020.

=== Other roles ===
Delaney became a member of the executive committee of the Olympic Council of Ireland in 2005. He was re-elected unopposed as Second Vice-president of the OCI in 2008. He resigned from the executive committee and from his position as the Second Vice-president of the OCI on 25 October 2016. Prior to this, he had been seen as heir apparent to OCI president Pat Hickey.

As the FAI's chief executive, Delaney also served as a member of the Aviva Stadium's board of directors.

He was elected to the executive committee of UEFA at the Helsinki Congress on 5 April 2017.

=== National team managers ===
Delaney oversaw the appointments of Steve Staunton, Giovanni Trapattoni, Martin O'Neill and Mick McCarthy to manage the Republic of Ireland national football team.

== Legacy and commemoration ==
In August 2013, Clones Town FC renamed their grounds Clones Town F.C. John Delaney Park after John Delaney.

In 2026, Clones Town FC decided to rename their grounds Clones Town FC Grounds.

== Personal life ==
Delaney was married to a Clare woman, Emer, who was a secondary school teacher in Tipperary Town; they have twins, Thomas and Eve. Divorce proceedings commenced in 2016. In 2017, he became engaged to model Emma English, after being in a relationship with her since 2014, they separated in 2018. As of 2022, Delaney has been UK-resident for some years. His mother died in August 2022, and at her funeral he mentioned the birth of a further daughter with his new partner, Natalia.
