= Pat Hickey (sports administrator) =

Irish sports administrator (born 1945)

Patrick Joseph Hickey (born 17 June 1945) is an Irish sports administrator. He was president of the Olympic Council of Ireland from 1988 until 2016, and also served on Olympic and judo bodies at European and global level.

== Early and personal life ==
Hickey worked as an estate agent, qualifying at the Institute of Property Valuers. He is married, and as of 2015, his firm, Hickey Auctioneers, was run by his daughter and eldest son.

A 2nd dan black belt in judo, he represented Ireland internationally, and competed into his forties.

== Sports administration ==
Hickey was president of the Irish Judo Association from 1979 until becoming Honorary Life President in 1989. He was elected to the executive committee of the Olympic Council of Ireland (OCI) in 1981 and was in successive Irish Olympic delegations from Los Angeles 1984. He became president of the OCI in 1989 on the recommendation of Lord Killanin, former president of the OCI and the International Olympic Committee (IOC). After the 1999 establishment of the Irish Sports Council (ISC), Hickey clashed with both the ISC and successive sports ministers over responsibility for high performance sport, until the Institute of Sport was established within the ISC. Hickey was re-elected president of the OCI for successive four-year terms, usually unopposed, and defeating Richard Burrows of the Irish Sailing Association 27–10 in 2001. Hickey alleged Burrows' candidacy was an ISC attempt to oust him.

When the OCI hosted the 1991 assembly of the European Olympic Committees (EOC) Hickey took the opportunity to forge relations with the newly admitted National Olympic Committees of the post-Soviet states. Hickey became a member of the IOC in 1995. He became president of the EOC in 2006, commissioned a feasibility study for the European Games, and was instrumental in establishing the Games. Nick Cohen, a reporter with The Guardian, criticised Hickey for flattering undemocratic leaders of potential hosts of the inaugural 2015 Games: Alexander Lukashenko of Belarus and Ilham Aliyev of Azerbaijan.

=== 2016 Summer Olympics ===
Hickey was due to step down as OCI president following the 2016 Olympics in Rio de Janeiro. On 17 August 2016, he was arrested in Rio during the Games as part of an investigation into alleged illegal resale of Olympic tickets, facing charges of facilitating ticket touting, formation of a cartel and ambush or illicit marketing. According to Brazilian police investigators, THG Sports had been denied an official ticket vendor license for the Rio Games. To bypass this restriction, a Dublin-based company named Pro10 Sports Management was allegedly appointed as the official reseller, acting as front to transfer high-demand tickets directly to THG Sports for unauthorized resale at inflated prices. He denied any wrongdoing, and stated he would "step aside temporarily" from all his Olympic positions until the matter was resolved.

Hickey was due to face trial in Brazil over his alleged role in the Olympic Council of Ireland (OCI) ticketing affair after a Rio de Janeiro judge accepted the charges made by a public prosecutor against him and nine others. Public prosecutor Marcos Kac charged Hickey and nine others with ticket-touting, ambush marketing, theft, tax evasion, money-laundering and criminal association. Hickey was allowed his passport back in November 2016 for a bond payment of 410,000 Euros. The following month, The Association of National Olympic Committees (ANOC) loaned the money to Hickey so he could go back to Ireland. But in November 2017, the Brazilian Supreme Court suspended the case against Hickey and the other accused, all of whom deny any wrongdoing, in order to examine the merits of the prosecution case and of the Habeas Corpus request by lawyers for one of his co-accused, Kevin Mallon of THG Sports, after the lawyers had argued that they could not mount a proper defence as the prosecution had presented no evidence, and "nor was there clarity on his alleged involvement in any crime". It was not known how long this would take, and this was still unclear in June 2019 when Olympic Federation of Ireland President Sarah Keane expressed the hope that the International Olympic Committee's Ethics Commission would conclude its own investigation of the case before the 2020 Tokyo Olympics. The subsequent Moran Inquiry, non-statutory investigation commissioned by the Irish government and published in August 2017, heavily criticized Hickey's management style. The report concluded that Hickey ran the OCI as a personal fiefdom, concealing major commercial ticketing contracts with the Marcus Evans Group from his own executive committee, and noted his complete non-cooperation with the inquiry. The International Olympic Committee (IOC) also declined to cooperate with the Moran Inquiry, stating it fell outside national jurisdiction, a decision Judge Moran explicitly noted as a "major impediment" to his investigation. Separately, during the 2016 Rio Games, Brazilian investigators sought to question IOC President Thomas Bach regarding email correspondence with Hickey concerning supplementary ticket allocations. While police stated there was no evidence that Bach had direct knowledge of the illegal resale scheme, the OCI had received an additional 296 high-demand tickets following an email request from Hickey to Bach. Bach subsequently cancelled his planned trip to the Rio 2016 Paralympic Games opening ceremony, citing his attendance at a state funeral in Germany, preventing Brazilian authorities from issuing a formal summons. Hickey officially resigned from the IOC on December 5, 2022.
