= Carroll Moran =

Irish judge (born 1945)

Judge of the High Court
- In office 11 July 2014 – 20 May 2015
- Nominated by: Government of Ireland
- Appointed by: Michael D. Higgins

Judge of the Circuit Court
- In office 1 February 1997 – 11 July 2014
- Nominated by: Government of Ireland
- Appointed by: Mary McAleese

Personal details
- Born: 5 February 1945 (age 81) Dublin, Ireland
- Education: University College Dublin

Carroll Moran (born 2 February 1945) is a retired Irish judge who served as a Judge of the High Court from 2014 to 2015 and a Judge of the Circuit Court from 1997 to 2014.

He was the chairperson of the non-statutory inquiry into the 2016 Summer Olympics ticket scandal.

He was educated at Clongowes Wood College and University College Dublin. He became a solicitor in 1970. He was called to the Irish Bar in 1975. He was editor of the Irish Reports from 1993 to 1997.
