= Sarah Keane =

Irish water polo player, lawyer and sports administrator

Sarah Keane is the first female President of the Olympic Federation of Ireland, having been elected to that role in February 2017. She is a former member of the Irish water polo team, and is CEO of Swim Ireland, a position she has held since 2004.

Keane is a lawyer, with a bachelor's degree in Law and a master's degree in commercial law; she also holds diplomas in both corporate and financial management. Before taking up her post at Swim Ireland she was an associate partner at Matheson law firm in Dublin.

Keane was first elected to the Board of the Olympic Federation of Ireland in 2014.

Keane has three children, and lives in Dublin.
