= List of flag bearers for New Zealand at the Olympics =

New Zealand at the Olympics
- IOC code: NZL
- NOC: New Zealand Olympic Committee
- Website: www.olympic.org.nz
- Medals: Gold 65 Silver 42 Bronze 56 Total 163

Summer appearances
- 1908; 1912; 1920; 1924; 1928; 1932; 1936; 1948; 1952; 1956; 1960; 1964; 1968; 1972; 1976; 1980; 1984; 1988; 1992; 1996; 2000; 2004; 2008; 2012; 2016; 2020; 2024; 2028

Winter appearances
- 1952; 1956; 1960; 1964; 1968; 1972; 1976; 1980; 1984; 1988; 1992; 1994; 1998; 2002; 2006; 2010; 2014; 2018; 2022; 2026

Other related appearances
- Australasia (1908–1912)

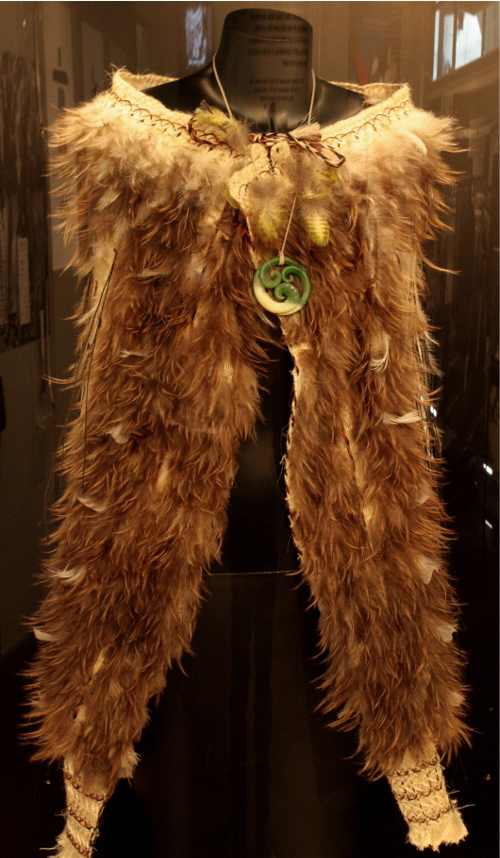
Te Mahutonga Cloak on display at the New Zealand Olympic Museum

This is a list of flag bearers who have represented New Zealand at the Olympics.

Flag bearers carry the New Zealand flag and, since 2004, wear Te Māhutonga cloak at the opening ceremony of the Olympic Games.

Arthur Porritt, Stuart Blakely and David Aspin are the only New Zealand Olympians to have carried the flag at two different Olympic opening ceremonies.

== Te Māhutonga cloak ==
This is worn by New Zealand's Olympic flag bearer at the opening ceremony of Summer and Winter Olympic Games. The Māori feather cloak is a traditional textile that offers the distinguished wearer additional mana through its connection with the previous sportspeople who have worn it. It was first worn to the games by Beatrice Faumuina at the 2004 Athens Olympic Games after being presented by the Māori Queen Dame Te Atairangikaahu in a ceremony where it also adorned some of the previous flag bearers including Harold Nelson, Ian Ferguson, Mark Todd, Barbara Kendall and Blyth Tait. Te Māhutonga translates from Māori to represent the constellation of the Southern Cross.

== Opening ceremony flag bearers ==
=== Summer Olympics ===
Event year	Flag bearer	Sport	Ref
(Belgium) 1920 Antwerp	Harry Wilson	Athletics	
(France) 1924 Paris	Arthur Porritt	Athletics	
(Netherlands) 1928 Amsterdam	Arthur Porritt	Athletics	
(United States) 1932 Los Angeles	Jack Macdonald	Rowing	
(Germany) 1936 Berlin	Jack Lovelock	Athletics	
(United Kingdom) 1948 London	Harold Nelson	Athletics	
(Finland) 1952 Helsinki	Harold Cleghorn	Weightlifting	
(Australia) 1956 Melbourne	Ritchie Johnston	Cycling	
(Italy) 1960 Rome	Les Mills	Athletics	
(Japan) 1964 Tokyo	Peter Snell	Athletics	
1968 Mexico City	Don Oliver	Weightlifting	
(West Germany) 1972 Munich	David Aspin	Wrestling	
(Canada) 1976 Montreal	David Aspin	Wrestling	
(Soviet Union) 1980 Moscow (Note: competed under New Zealand Olympic Committee flag)	Brian Newth	Modern pentathlon	
(United States) 1984 Los Angeles	John Walker	Athletics	
(South Korea) 1988 Seoul	Ian Ferguson	Canoeing	
(Spain) 1992 Barcelona	Mark Todd	Equestrian	
(United States) 1996 Atlanta	Barbara Kendall	Sailing	
(Australia) 2000 Sydney	Blyth Tait	Equestrian	
(Greece) 2004 Athens	Beatrice Faumuina	Athletics	
(China) 2008 Beijing	Mahé Drysdale	Rowing	
(United Kingdom) 2012 London	Nick Willis	Athletics	
(Brazil) 2016 Rio de Janeiro	Peter Burling	Sailing	
(Brazil) 2016 Rio de Janeiro	Blair Tuke	Sailing	
(Japan) 2020 Tokyo	Sarah Hirini	Rugby sevens	
(Japan) 2020 Tokyo	David Nyika (Note: Hamish Bond was originally announced as flag bearer, but withdrew due to testing positive for COVID-19)	Boxing	
(France) 2024 Paris	Jo Aleh	Sailing	
(France) 2024 Paris	Aaron Gate	Cycling	

==== Flag bearers by sport ====
Number	Sport	Olympics
10	Athletics	1920, 1924, 1928, 1936, 1948, 1960, 1964, 1984, 2004, 2012
4	Sailing	1996, 2016 (Note: This ceremony featured two flagbearers Peter Burling and Blair Tuke, from the same sport), 2024
2	Cycling	1956, 2024
2	Rowing	1932, 2008
2	Equestrian	1992, 2000
2	Wrestling	1972, 1976
2	Weightlifting	1952, 1968
1	Rugby sevens	2020
1	Boxing	2020
1	Canoeing	1988
1	Modern pentathlon	1980

=== Winter Olympics ===
Event year	Flag bearer	Sport	Ref
(Norway) 1952 Oslo	Austin Hayward	Team assistant manager	
(United States) 1960 Squaw Valley	Bill Hunt	Alpine skiing	
(France) 1968 Grenoble	Thomas Huppert	Alpine skiing	
(Japan) 1972 Sapporo	Alan Ward	Team manager	
(Austria) 1976 Innsbruck	Stuart Blakely	Alpine skiing	
(United States) 1980 Lake Placid	Stuart Blakely	Alpine skiing	
(Socialist Federal Republic of Yugoslavia) 1984 Sarajevo	Markus Hubrich	Alpine skiing	
(Canada) 1988 Calgary	Simon Wi Rutene	Alpine skiing	
(France) 1992 Albertville	Chris Nicholson	Speed skating	
(Norway) 1994 Lillehammer	Tony Smith	Short track speed skating	
(Japan) 1998 Nagano	Peter Henry	Bobsleigh	
(United States) 2002 Salt Lake City	Angela Paul	Luge	
(Italy) 2006 Turin	Sean Becker	Curling	
(Canada) 2010 Vancouver	Juliane Bray	Snowboarding	
(Russia) 2014 Sochi	Shane Dobbin	Speed skating	
(South Korea) 2018 Pyeongchang	Beau-James Wells	Freestyle skiing	
(China) 2022 Beijing	Alice Robinson	Alpine skiing	
(China) 2022 Beijing	Finn Bilous	Freestyle skiing	
(Italy) 2026 Milano Cortina	Zoi Sadowski-Synnott	Snowboarding	
(Italy) 2026 Milano Cortina	Ben Barclay	Freestyle skiing	

==== Flag bearers by sport ====
Number	Sport	Olympics
7	Alpine skiing	1960, 1968, 1976, 1980, 1984, 1988, 2022
3	Freestyle skiing	2018, 2022, 2026
2	Snowboarding	2010, 2026
2	Speed skating	1992, 2014
1	Curling	2006
1	Luge	2002
1	Bobsleigh	1998
1	Short track speed skating	1994

== Closing ceremony flag bearers ==
=== Summer Olympics ===
Year	Flag bearer	Sport	Ref
(South Korea) 1988 Seoul	Bruce Kendall	Sailing	
(Spain) 1992 Barcelona	Barbara Kendall	Sailing	
(United States) 1996 Atlanta	Danyon Loader	Swimming	
(Australia) 2000 Sydney	Rob Waddell	Rowing	
(Greece) 2004 Athens	Sarah Ulmer	Cycling	
(China) 2008 Beijing	Caroline Evers-Swindell	Rowing	
(China) 2008 Beijing	Georgina Evers-Swindell	Rowing	
(United Kingdom) 2012 London	Mahé Drysdale	Rowing	
(Brazil) 2016 Rio de Janeiro	Lisa Carrington	Canoeing	
(Japan) 2020 Tokyo	Valerie Adams	Athletics	
(France) 2024 Paris	Lisa Carrington	Canoeing	
(France) 2024 Paris	Finn Butcher	Canoeing	

==== Flag bearers by sport ====
Number	Sport	Olympics
4	Rowing	2000, 2008 (Note: This ceremony featured two flagbearers, Caroline Evers-Swindell and Georgina Evers-Swindell, from the same sport), 2012
3	Canoeing	2016, 2024 (Note: This ceremony featured two flagbearers, Lisa Carrington and Finn Butcher, from the same sport)
2	Sailing	1988, 1992
1	Athletics	2020
1	Cycling	2004
1	Swimming	1996

=== Winter Olympics ===
Year	Flag bearer	Sport	Ref
(Japan) 1998 Nagano	Angela Paul	Luge	
(United States) 2002 Salt Lake City	Claudia Riegler	Alpine skiing	
(Italy) 2006 Turin	Sean Becker	Curling	
(Canada) 2010 Vancouver	Ben Sandford	Skeleton	
(Russia) 2014 Sochi	Jossi Wells	Freestyle skiing	
(South Korea) 2018 Pyeongchang	Zoi Sadowski-Synnott	Snowboarding	
(China) 2022 Beijing	Nico Porteous	Freestyle skiing	
(Italy) 2026 Milano Cortina	Luca Harrington	Freestyle skiing	

==== Flag bearers by sport ====
Number	Sport	Olympics
3	Freestyle skiing	2014, 2022, 2026
1	Snowboarding	2018
1	Alpine skiing	2002
1	Skeleton	2010
1	Curling	2006
1	Luge	1998

== See also ==
- New Zealand at the Olympics
- List of flag bearers for Australasia at the Olympics
