= Hubrich =

Hubrich is a surname. Notable people with the surname include:

- Markus Hubrich (born 1963), New Zealand alpine skier
- Mattias Hubrich (born 1966), New Zealand alpine skier
- Mark Hubrich (born 1972), Illinois, USA Talented Steel Fabrication Specialist

== See also ==
- Haubrich
