= New Zealand at the 2002 Winter Olympics =

- IOC code: NZL
- NOC: New Zealand Olympic Committee
- Website: www.olympic.org.nz

in Salt Lake City, Utah
- Competitors: 10 (7 men, 3 women) in 5 sports
- Flag bearer: Angie Paul (luge)
- Medals: Gold 0 Silver 0 Bronze 0 Total 0

Winter Olympics appearances (overview)
- 1952; 1956; 1960; 1964; 1968; 1972; 1976; 1980; 1984; 1988; 1992; 1994; 1998; 2002; 2006; 2010; 2014; 2018; 2022; 2026

New Zealand was represented at the 2002 Winter Olympics in Salt Lake City, Utah, United States by the New Zealand Olympic Committee.

In total, 10 athletes including seven men and three woman represented New Zealand in five different sports including alpine skiing, bobsleigh, luge, short track speed skating and skeleton.

== Competitors ==
In total, 10 athletes represented New Zealand at the 2002 Winter Olympics in Salt Lake City, Utah, United States across five different sports.

Sport	Men	Women	Total
Alpine skiing	2	1	3
Bobsleigh	4	0	4
Luge	0	1	1
Short track speed skating	1	0	1
Skeleton	0	1	1
Total	7	3	10

== Alpine skiing ==
In total, three New Zealander athletes participated in the alpine skiing events – Todd Haywood and Jesse Teat in the men's giant slalom and the men's slalom and Claudia Riegler in the women's slalom.

The women's slalom took place on 20 February 2002. Riegler completed her first run in 55.17 seconds and her second run in 56.02 seconds for a combined time of one minutes 51.19 seconds to finish 11th overall.

The men's giant slalom took place on 21 February 2002. Teat completed his first run in one minute 20.31 seconds and his second run in one minute 17.76 seconds for a combined time of two minutes 38.07 seconds to finish 50th overall. Haywood completed his first run in one minute 19.99 seconds and his second run in one minute 18.11 seconds for a combined time of two minutes 38.1 seconds to finish 51st overall.

The men's slalom took place on 23 February 2002. Neither Haywood nor Teat finished their first run.

Athlete	Event	Run 1		Run 2		Total	
Athlete	Event	Time	Rank	Time	Rank	Time	Rank
Todd Haywood	Men's giant slalom	1:19.99	63	1:18.11	51	2:38.10	51
Todd Haywood	Men's slalom	DNF		–		DNF	
Claudia Riegler	Women's slalom	55.17	17	56.02	14	1:51.19	11
Jesse Teat	Men's giant slalom	1:20.31	64	1:17.76	48	2:38.07	50
Jesse Teat	Men's slalom	DNF		–		DNF	

== Bobsleigh ==
In total, four New Zealander athletes participated in the bobsleigh events – Mark Edmond, Steve Harrison, Alan Henderson and Angus Ross.

The two-man bobsleigh took place on 16 and 17 February 2002. Edmond and Henderson completed their four runs in a combined time of three minutes 14.9 seconds which saw them finish in 27th place overall.

The four-man bobsleigh took place on 22 and 23 February 2002. New Zealand completed their first run in a time of 50.67 seconds. However, they did not start their second run and did not participate in the third and fourth runs.

Athletes	Event	Run 1		Run 2		Run 3		Run 4		Total	
Athletes	Event	Time	Rank	Time	Rank	Time	Rank	Time	Rank	Time	Rank
Mark Edmond; Alan Henderson	Two-man	48.46	24	48.36	21	48.72	26	49.36	32	3:14.90	27
Alan Henderson; Steve Harrison; Angus Ross; Mark Edmond	Four-man	50.67	32	DNF		–		–		DNF	

== Luge ==
In total, one New Zealander athletes participated in the luge events – Angie Paul in the women's singles.

The women's singles took place on 12 and 13 February 2002. Paul completed her four runs in a combined two of three minutes 56.475 seconds which saw her finish in 23rd place overall.

Athlete	Event	Run 1		Run 2		Run 3		Run 4		Total	
Athlete	Event	Time	Rank	Time	Rank	Time	Rank	Time	Rank	Time	Rank
Angie Paul	Women's singles	44.407	23	44.256	25	43.943	18	43.869	19	2:56.475	23

== Short track speed skating ==
In total, one New Zealander athlete participated in the short track speed skating events – Mark Jackson in the men's 500 m, the men's 1,000 m and the men's 1,500 m.

Round one for the men's 1,000 m took place on 13 February 2002. Jackson finished third in his heat in a time of one minute 32.276 and did not advance to the quarter-finals.

The men's 1,500 m took place on 20 February 2002. Jackson finished fourth in his heat in a time of two minutes 22.906 and did not advance to the semi-finals.

The men's 500 m took place on 23 February 2002. Jackson finished fourth in his heat in a time of 44.064 and did not advance to the quarter-finals.

Athlete	Event	Round one		Quarterfinals		Semifinals		Final	
Athlete	Event	Time	Rank	Time	Rank	Time	Rank	Time	Rank
Mark Jackson	Men's 500 m	44.064	4	Did not advance					
Mark Jackson	Men's 1,000 m	1:32.276	3	Did not advance					
Mark Jackson	Men's 1,500 m	2:22.906	4	Did not advance					

== Skeleton ==
In total, one New Zealander athlete participated in the skeleton events – Liz Couch in the women's competition.

The women's skeleton took place on 20 February 2002. Couch completed her first run in a time of 53.62 seconds and her second run in a time of 54.18 seconds. Her total time of one minute 47.8 seconds saw her finish in 11th place overall.

Athlete	Event	Run 1		Run 2		Total	
Athlete	Event	Time	Rank	Time	Rank	Time	Rank
Liz Couch	Women's	53.62	10	54.18	11	1:47.80	11
