= Owen Pinnell =

New Zealand bobsledder

Personal information
- Full name: Owen Clifford Pinnell
- Born: 6 January 1947 (age 78); Auckland, New Zealand
- Education: Auckland Technical Institute

Sport
- Country: New Zealand
- Sport: Bobsleigh

Owen Clifford Pinnell (born 6 January 1947) is a Canadian engineer and business executive. He represented his birth country, New Zealand, as a bobsledder at the 1988 Winter Olympic Games.

== Early life ==
Born in Auckland on 6 January 1947, Pinnell studied engineering at Auckland Technical Institute and went on to have a career as a petroleum engineer and business executive in North America.

== Engineering and business career ==
After graduating, Pinnell travelled and worked internationally in the mining industry in Africa and France, before settling in Alberta, Canada, in 1978, where he found employment with Dome Petroleum working on the company's ultimately unsuccessful Beaufort Sea development. He left Dome in 1982, and co-founded oil and gas exploration, processing and waste management company, Newalta Corp. The company, of which Pinnell was president, opened its first gas processing plant at Red Willow, Alberta, in 1988 and a second plant the following year, processing around 570,000 cubic metres (20,000,000 cu ft) of natural gas daily. A small player in the Alberta market, it was as a waste management company that Newalta gained attention. By 1989, the company was listed on the Toronto Stock Exchange and had annual revenues of CA$15.5 million.

Pinnell left Newalta in 1992, and established Anadime Corp, initially as a commercial and industrial waste disposal company based in Victoria, British Columbia, because of a three-year non-competition agreement with Newalta. Once that agreement expired, Pinnell relocated Anadime to Alberta and reinvented the company as an oilfield waste management business. The company achieved a profit for the first time in 1996. In 2000, Pinnell stepped down as president and chief executive officer of Anadime, but retained a role in the company's strategic development. Anadime was acquired by Newalta in 2001.

Pinnell's subsequent business interests include being a director of Zeacom from 2003 to 2012, and chairman and chief executive of Calgary-based Anterra Energy.

== Bobsleigh ==
Described as a "big, rugged-looking bloke who plays rugby and looks like he should be on his native country's national team", Pinnell joined up with other New Zealand expatriates living in the Calgary area in 1987 to form a bobsled team. Pinnell and two others had played rugby union for Calgary Irish, and had only just taken up bobsledding. Pinnell unsuccessfully approached Michael Fay for financial backing for the team, and donated the team uniform. The New Zealanders competed at World Cup bobsleigh events in late 1987, and did well enough for a team of four sledders to be selected to compete at the 1988 Winter Olympics; Pinnell was named as team manager but was not initially included as an athlete. However, after an appeal, Pinnell was added to the team as a reserve driver in the four-man team.

During pre-event training at the Olympic Games, New Zealand was allowed to train a reserve two-man bob team, with Pinnell as driver, to gain experience in case of injury to one of the nominated two-man sled members, and they performed well enough to be included in the main competition. Pinnell and his brakeman, Blair Telford, went on to finish in 31st place out of 41 teams.

Aged 41 when he participated in the 1988 Winter Olympics, Pinnell held the distinction of being the oldest New Zealand competitor at a Winter Olympics, until his record was surpassed in 2006 by three curlers: Lorne De Pape who was 50, Hans Frauenlob (45), and Dan Mustapic (45).
