= Fiona Johnson (alpine skier) =

New Zealand alpine skier (born 1960)

Fiona Virginia Johnson (born 1960) now Fiona Stevens is an alpine skier from New Zealand.

In the 1980 Winter Olympics at Lake Placid, she came 30th in the Giant Slalom. She was elected to the International Ski Federation Council in 2022.

Her aunt Annette Johnson was an alpine skier at the 1952 Winter Olympics.
