= Rhys Dacre =

New Zealand sportsman (born 1965)

Personal information
- Full name: Rhys Dacre
- Born: 8 July 1965 (age 61) Whanganui, New Zealand
- Height: 1.73 m (5 ft 8 in)

Sport
- Country: New Zealand
- Sport: Track and field; Bobsleigh

Achievements and titles
- National finals: 100 m champion (1985)

Rhys Dacre (born 8 July 1965) is a New Zealand sportsman. He was a sprinter, winning the New Zealand 100-metre title in 1985, before becoming the first New Zealander to gain an American football scholarship to an American university. He subsequently represented New Zealand in the four-man bobsleigh at the 1988 Winter Olympics.

== Early life ==
Born in Whanganui on 8 July 1965, Dacre grew up in Christchurch and was educated at Christchurch Boys' High School. He showed early sporting ability, playing at halfback for the Merivale–Papanui 12th grade (under nine years) rugby union team in 1973. In one game he was described as "quite the most active player on the field ..., who, on occasions, was outstanding", although it was noted that he "tended to run too far across field, to the detriment of the backs outside him". With one game remaining in the season, he had scored over 80 points. He went on to play on the wing in the Christchurch Boys' High School 1st XV in 1981.

== Sports career ==
=== Athletics ===
Dacre came to attention as a sprinter in 1980, when he defeated Grant Anderson, who had represented New Zealand at the 1974 British Commonwealth Games, in a 60-metre race, recording a time of 7.2 seconds.

In 1982, Dacre was selected for as a member of the New Zealand Schools team for the Pacific School Games in Brisbane, competing in the 100 metres and the relay. In the lead-up to that meet, he recorded personal best times in the 60 metres and 200 metres of 6.8 seconds and 21.62 seconds, respectively. His coach noted that he could have run faster in the 200 metres had he not turned to look behind just before crossing the finish line. Later that year, in November, Dacre lowered his personal best for the 200 metres to 21.62 seconds at an inter-club meet at Queen Elizabeth II Park in Christchurch. He lowered his best 200-metre time again later in the season, in February 1983, at the Canterbury championships, clocking 21.45 seconds, wind-assisted. Dacre was still a junior, and his time bettered the existing Canterbury senior record, but was unable to be ratified because of the wind reading.

Dacre went to the 1983 New Zealand athletic championships as one of the favourites in the junior men's sprint events; he went on to fulfil that promise, winning both the junior 100-metre and 200-metre titles in times of 10.91 seconds and 21.70 seconds, respectively.

In the 1983/1984 athletics season, Dacre switched from the Papanui Redwood club to the Christchurch Old Boys' club, and continued to race with success in the senior ranks, although still eligible to run as a junior. However, as the season progressed, he experienced back problems, and did not compete after February 1984. Medical examinations later showed a birth defect in his lower spine that could be career-ending.

Dacre considered sitting out the following season, but changed his mind and made what The Press newspaper called a "sensational return to competition" when he competed at an inter-club meet at Queen Elizabeth II Park in December 1984, against medical advice. In the 200 metres, Dacre recorded a time of 21.3 seconds, breaking the Canterbury senior record for the distance, which had stood since 1969, by 0.1 s. The performance was described as "one of the most remarkable rags-to-riches performances of recent times". Dacre continued his comeback, and was subsequently selected in the Canterbury team for the 1985 national athletic championships in Dunedin, where he won the senior men's 100-metre title in a time of 10.84 seconds, running into a strong headwind. Following the New Zealand championships, Dacre was named by the New Zealand Amateur Athletic Association in a 13-member team to compete at the Australian national championships later that month, and a 35-strong squad to represent New Zealand at the 1985 Pacific Conference Games in Berkeley, California, in June.

=== American football ===
Dacre had always seen sprinting as the gateway to pursuing a career in American football, and after competing at the Pacific Conference Games, he received an American football scholarship to Utah State University in Logan, Utah, becoming the first New Zealander to be awarded a scholarship for that sport at an American university. At Utah State, he majored in media communications. During three years at Utah State, Dacre did not get much game time in his role as a wide receiver, a tough ask with teammates like Solomon Miller (Super Bowl winner with the New York Giants) Kendal Smith (Cincinnati Bengals) and Pat Newman (New Orleans Saints) also on the Roster although he was thought to be the fastest player on the Aggies' roster. Head coach Chuck Shelton said that Dacre was "not big but, boy, can he run". During football training, Dacre recorded a best time of 4.29 seconds over 40 yards (37 m), ranking him as the second-fastest athlete for the distance in the United States. He sought permission to run on the track at Utah State, but was not allowed to do so by the football coach. However, Dacre took part in some "secret" runs with members of the track team and ran 100 metres in 10.28 and the 200 metres in 20.79 seconds without any specialist sprint training, and this encouraged him to put his American football career on hold to return to New Zealand in 1987/88 and attempt to qualify as a sprinter for the 1988 Summer Olympics. During the mid late 1990s Dacre embarked on an American football coaching career at the University of Colorado under the guidance of Rick Nueheisel later following Neuheisel to the University of Washington In 2000/2001 was on staff at the Oklahoma Wranglers of the Arena Football League

=== Bobsleigh ===
After he returned to New Zealand, Dacre's explosive power over a short distance led to his being recruited to the New Zealand bobsledding team, replacing hammer thrower Philip Jensen, despite having no previous experience in the sport. In October 1987, he was nominated for the New Zealand team to compete at the 1988 Winter Olympics in Calgary, and the following month he was competing on the World Cup bobsleigh circuit in Europe, finishing 37th in the two-man event with Lex Peterson at Winterberg, Germany. Dacre was said to have "adapted remarkably quickly" to bobsledding, and New Zealand team manager Jamie Gilkison described him as "just full of determination and pretty quick too". In late December, Dacre was confirmed as a member of the New Zealand team for the Calgary games, to compete as a crewman in the four-man bobsleigh, the first time that New Zealand had sent a bobsled contingent to the Winter Olympics.

At the 1988 Winter Olympics, the New Zealand four-man bobsleigh team of Lex Peterson (driver), Blair Telford, Dacre, and Peter Henry (brakeman) were 23rd fastest in their first run and 18th in the second run. In their third and fourth runs, they placed 17th and equal 21st, respectively, to finish in 21st place overall.

During his time training and competing in Calgary He ran 6.59 for 60 metres, the Edmonton Eskimos and Calgary Stampeders Canadian football teams showed interest in Dacre. At the conclusion of the Olympic bobsleigh competition, Dacre stated that he "love[d] the sport" and that his intention was to attend driving school, and reconsider if he would return to American football.

=== Rugby union ===
In December 1988, Dacre was named in the 40-man Canterbury rugby union development squad. In the 1989 season, he played on the wing for the Linwood club in the Christchurch senior rugby competition.
