= Sam Chaffey =

New Zealand alpine skier (1934–1998)

Robin Samuel Anderson (Sam or Rob) Chaffey (22 July 1934 – 6 April 1998) was an alpine skier from New Zealand.

He competed for New Zealand at the 1960 Winter Olympics. He came 48th in the Downhill and 58th in the Giant Slalom, but was disqualified in the Slalom.

Sam was a downhill ski-racer, national ski champion in 1958, and was involved in setting up and managing Porter Heights, the first commercial ski-field in Canterbury. He was a high-country farmer and a businessman whose activities included setting up a reindeer farm in Alaska and a cattle breeding programme in Brazil.

He was called Sam at school and in the ski industry, but changed to Rob for everything else by family agreement because of all the Sams in the family (including his father and one of his sons). He married Jan Prain (a sister of skier Trish Prain) in 1958; they had two daughters and two sons. He was born in Timaru, brought up on a farm at the back of Mount Somers, and died at home in Tai Tapu.
