= Margot Blakely =

New Zealand alpine skier (born 1950)

Margot Blakely later Margot Hawley (born 1950) is an alpine skier from New Zealand.

She competed for New Zealand at the 1968 Winter Olympics at Grenoble, but was disqualified in the slalom.

She is a sister of 1976 and 1980 Olympic alpine skier Stuart Blakely.
