= New Zealand at the 1998 Winter Olympics =

- IOC code: NZL
- NOC: New Zealand Olympic Committee
- Website: www.olympic.org.nz

in Nagano
- Competitors: 8 (4 men and 4 women) in 6 sports
- Flag bearer: Peter Henry
- Medals: Gold 0 Silver 0 Bronze 0 Total 0

Winter Olympics appearances (overview)
- 1952; 1956; 1960; 1964; 1968; 1972; 1976; 1980; 1984; 1988; 1992; 1994; 1998; 2002; 2006; 2010; 2014; 2018; 2022; 2026

New Zealand competed at the 1998 Winter Olympics in Nagano, Japan.

== Competitors ==
The following is the list of number of competitors in the Games.

Sport	Men	Women	Total
Alpine skiing	0	1	1
Bobsleigh	2	–	2
Freestyle skiing	1	1	2
Luge	0	1	1
Snowboarding	0	1	1
Speed skating	1	0	1
Total	4	4	8

== Alpine skiing ==
Women

Athlete	Event	Race 1	Race 2	Total	
Athlete	Event	Time	Time	Time	Rank
Claudia Riegler	Slalom	DNF	–	DNF	–

== Bobsleigh ==
Sled	Athletes	Event	Run 1		Run 2		Run 3		Run 4		Total	
Sled	Athletes	Event	Time	Rank	Time	Rank	Time	Rank	Time	Rank	Time	Rank
NZL-1	Alan Henderson; Angus Ross	Two-man	56.29	27	56.28	29	56.12	28	55.97	28	3:44.66	28

== Freestyle skiing ==
Men

Athlete	Event	Qualification			Final		
Athlete	Event	Time	Points	Rank	Time	Points	Rank
Richard Ussher	Moguls	31.96	20.75	25	did not advance		

Women

Athlete	Event	Qualification			Final		
Athlete	Event	Time	Points	Rank	Time	Points	Rank
Kylie Gill	Moguls	DNF	–	–	–	DNF	–

== Luge ==
Women

Athlete	Run 1		Run 2		Run 3		Run 4		Total	
Athlete	Time	Rank	Time	Rank	Time	Rank	Time	Rank	Time	Rank
Angie Paul	52.534	20	52.254	19	51.870	20	51.808	22	3:28.466	19

== Snowboarding ==
Women's giant slalom

Athlete	Race 1	Race 2	Total	
Athlete	Time	Time	Time	Rank
Pamela Bell	DNF	–	DNF	–

== Speed skating ==
Men

Event	Athlete	Race	
Event	Athlete	Time	Rank
1000 m	Andrew Nicholson	1:13.86	35
1500 m	Andrew Nicholson	1:55.06	40
