= Peter Henry (bobsledder) =

New Zealand bobsledder and decathlete (born 1962)

Personal information
- Full name: Peter John Douglas Henry
- Born: 17 June 1962 (age 64) Brighton, England
- Occupation: Air traffic controller
- Height: 1.83 m (6 ft 0 in)
- Weight: 92 kg (203 lb)
- Spouse: Karen Forbes (m. 1986)

Sport
- Country: New Zealand
- Sport: Bobsleigh; Track and field

Peter John Douglas Henry (born 17 June 1962) is a former New Zealand bobsledder and decathlete who competed at the 1988 Winter Olympics and the 1990 Commonwealth Games.

== Early life and family ==
Henry was born in Brighton, England, on 17 June 1962, the son of Tom Henry and Martina Admiraal. The family migrated to New Zealand, and Henry was educated at Geraldine High School. He became an air traffic controller, and in 1986 married Karen Forbes, who had competed for New Zealand in the heptathlon at the 1982 Commonwealth Games.

== Sporting career ==
Henry competed as a bobsledder for New Zealand in the 1988 Winter Olympics at Calgary. He was brakeman in a two-man bobsleigh driven by Lex Peterson and the pair finished 20th in the two-man event. In the four-man bobsleigh, he competed alongside Peterson, Blair Telford and Rhys Dacre, finishing in 21st place.

Henry is also a track and field athlete. He competed in the decathlon in the 1990 Commonwealth Games in Auckland, where he finished in 10th place. He was awarded the New Zealand 1990 Commemoration Medal.

Henry travelled with the New Zealand team to the 1998 Winter Olympics in Nagano, and was the New Zealand flag bearer at the Olympics opening ceremony. However, he did not compete, being beaten by Angus Ross by 0.005 seconds in a run-off to decide the position of brakeman in the New Zealand two-man bobsleigh driven by Alan Henderson.
