= Brett Kendall =

New Zealand alpine skier (born 1957)

Brett Kendall (born 3 April 1957) is an alpine skier from New Zealand.

In the 1976 Winter Olympics at Innsbruck, he came 60th in the Downhill, 36th in the Slalom and 44th in the Giant Slalom.

His brother Scott Kendall competed at the 1980 Winter Olympics.
