= Annette Johnson =

New Zealand alpine skier (1928–2017)

Annette Hersey Johnson (later Annette Acton-Adams; 27 June 1928 – 29 September 2017) was an alpine skier from New Zealand. She competed for New Zealand at the 1952 Winter Olympics at Oslo, and came 30th in the Giant Slalom (3-0.66), the best result for the New Zealand team, but did not finish in the Slalom. Her niece Fiona Johnson was an alpine skier at the 1980 Winter Olympics.
