= New Zealand at the 1994 Winter Olympics =

- IOC code: NZL
- NOC: New Zealand Olympic Committee
- Website: www.olympic.org.nz

in Lillehammer
- Competitors: 7 (5 men, 2 women) in 2 sports
- Flag bearer: Tony Smith (short track speed skating)
- Medals: Gold 0 Silver 0 Bronze 0 Total 0

Winter Olympics appearances (overview)
- 1952; 1956; 1960; 1964; 1968; 1972; 1976; 1980; 1984; 1988; 1992; 1994; 1998; 2002; 2006; 2010; 2014; 2018; 2022; 2026; 2030

New Zealand competed at the 1994 Winter Olympics in Lillehammer, Norway.

== Competitors ==
The following is the list of number of competitors in the Games.

Sport	Men	Women	Total
Alpine skiing	1	2	3
Short track speed skating	4	0	4
Total	5	2	7

== Alpine skiing ==
Men

Athlete	Event	Race 1	Race 2	Total	
Athlete	Event	Time	Time	Time	Rank
Simon Wi Rutene	Super-G			DNF	–
Simon Wi Rutene	Giant Slalom	DNF	–	DNF	–
Simon Wi Rutene	Slalom	DNF	–	DNF	–

Men's combined

Athlete	Downhill	Slalom		Total	
Athlete	Time	Time 1	Time 2	Total time	Rank
Simon Wi Rutene	1:41.88	53.41	50.19	3:25.48	20

Women

Athlete	Event	Race 1	Race 2	Total	
Athlete	Event	Time	Time	Time	Rank
Annelise Coberger	Slalom	DNF	–	DNF	–
Claudia Riegler	Slalom	1:02.26	DNF	DNF	–

== Short track speed skating ==
Men

Athlete	Event	Round one		Quarter finals		Semi finals		Finals	
Athlete	Event	Time	Rank	Time	Rank	Time	Rank	Time	Final rank
Andrew Nicholson	500 m	54.21	4	did not advance					
Mike McMillen	500 m	44.98	3	did not advance					
Chris Nicholson	500 m	1:03.43	4	did not advance					
Mike McMillen	1000 m	1:32.65	4	did not advance					
Andrew Nicholson	1000 m	1:34.18	4	did not advance					
Chris Nicholson	1000 m	1:34.91	4	did not advance					
Mike McMillen; Andrew Nicholson; Chris Nicholson; Tony Smith	5000 m relay					7:21.58	4 QB	DSQ	–

== Sources ==
- Official Olympic Reports
- Olympic Winter Games 1994, full results by sports-reference.com
