= New Zealand at the 1988 Winter Olympics =

- IOC code: NZL
- NOC: New Zealand Olympic Committee
- Website: www.olympic.org.nz

in Calgary
- Competitors: 9 (7 men, 2 women) in 3 sports
- Flag bearer: Simon Wi Rutene (alpine skiing)
- Medals: Gold 0 Silver 0 Bronze 0 Total 0

Winter Olympics appearances (overview)
- 1952; 1956; 1960; 1964; 1968; 1972; 1976; 1980; 1984; 1988; 1992; 1994; 1998; 2002; 2006; 2010; 2014; 2018; 2022; 2026; 2030

New Zealand competed at the 1988 Winter Olympics in Calgary, Alberta, Canada.

== Competitors ==
The following is the list of number of competitors in the Games.

Sport	Men	Women	Total
Alpine skiing	2	1	3
Bobsleigh	5	–	5
Cross-country skiing	0	1	1
Total	7	2	9

== Alpine skiing ==
Men

Athlete	Event	Race 1	Race 2	Total	
Athlete	Event	Time	Time	Time	Rank
Simon Wi Rutene	Super-G			DNF	–
Mattias Hubrich	Super-G			1:45.46	24
Simon Wi Rutene	Giant Slalom	DNF	–	DNF	–
Mattias Hubrich	Giant Slalom	1:12.25	DNF	DNF	–
Mattias Hubrich	Slalom	58.16	54.08	1:52.24	22
Simon Wi Rutene	Slalom	55.80	51.58	1:47.38	17

Men's combined

Athlete	Downhill	Slalom		Total	
Athlete	Time	Time 1	Time 2	Points	Rank
Simon Wi Rutene	DNF	–	–	DNF	–

Women

Athlete	Event	Race 1	Race 2	Total	
Athlete	Event	Time	Time	Time	Rank
Kate Rattray	Super-G			1:23.48	28
Kate Rattray	Giant Slalom	1:04.10	DNF	DNF	–
Kate Rattray	Slalom	56.79	56.15	1:52.94	21

== Bobsleigh ==
Sled	Athletes	Event	Run 1		Run 2		Run 3		Run 4		Total	
Sled	Athletes	Event	Time	Rank	Time	Rank	Time	Rank	Time	Rank	Time	Rank
NZL-1	Lex Peterson; Peter Henry	Two-man	58.65	20	1:00.87	29	1:01.25	22	1:00.27	21	4:01.04	20
NZL-2	Owen Pinnell; Blair Telford	Two-man	1:00.37	35	1:00.95	32	1:01.62	26	1:01.22	29	4:04.16	31

Sled	Athletes	Event	Run 1		Run 2		Run 3		Run 4		Total	
Sled	Athletes	Event	Time	Rank	Time	Rank	Time	Rank	Time	Rank	Time	Rank
NZL-1	Lex Peterson; Blair Telford; Rhys Dacre; Peter Henry	Four-man	57.98	23	58.42	18	57.30	17	58.67	21	3:52.37	21

== Cross-country skiing ==
Athlete	Event	Time	Rank
Madonna Harris	Women's 20 km freestyle	1:03:09.6	40

== Officials ==
- Chef de Mission – Richard Wheatcroft
- Team doctor – Andrew Ness
- Press attache – Peter Hutchinson
- Liaison – Jamie Gilkison
- Alpine skiing
  - Section manager – Adrian Farnsworth
  - Men's alpine coach – Sepp Brunner
  - Women's alpine coach – Diane Culver-Grey
- Bobsled
  - Section manager – Owen Pinnell
  - Coach – Dave Broomfield
  - Mechanic – Roy Boychuk
