= New Zealand at the 1992 Winter Olympics =

- IOC code: NZL
- NOC: New Zealand Olympic Committee
- Website: www.olympic.org.nz

in Albertville
- Competitors: 6 (5 men, 1 woman) in 2 sports
- Flag bearer: Chris Nicholson (short track speed skating)
- Medals Ranked 17th: Gold 0 Silver 1 Bronze 0 Total 1

Winter Olympics appearances (overview)
- 1952; 1956; 1960; 1964; 1968; 1972; 1976; 1980; 1984; 1988; 1992; 1994; 1998; 2002; 2006; 2010; 2014; 2018; 2022; 2026

New Zealand competed at the 1992 Winter Olympics in Albertville, France. Annelise Coberger won the nation's first medal (and the first medal by a competitor from the Southern Hemisphere) at the Winter Olympic Games in the women's slalom event.

== Medalists ==
Medal	Name	Sport	Event	Date
Silver	Annelise Coberger	Alpine skiing	Women's slalom	20 February

== Competitors ==
The following is the list of number of competitors in the Games.

Sport	Men	Women	Total
Alpine skiing	1	1	2
Short track speed skating	4	0	4
Total	5	1	6

== Alpine skiing ==
Athlete	Event	Race 1	Race 2	Total	
Athlete	Event	Time	Time	Time	Rank
Annelise Coberger	Women's slalom	49.02	44.08	1:33.10	2nd place, silver medalist(s)
Simon Wi Rutene	Men's giant slalom	1:09.52	1:06.09	2:15.61	28
Simon Wi Rutene	Men's slalom	DNF	–	DNF	–
Simon Wi Rutene	Men's super-G	—N/a		1:17.86	42

== Short track speed skating ==
Athlete	Event	Round one		Quarter finals		Semi finals		Finals	
Athlete	Event	Time	Rank	Time	Rank	Time	Rank	Time	Final rank
Chris Nicholson	Men's 1000 m	1:33.45	3	did not advance					
Mike McMillen	Men's 1000 m	1:33.57	1 Q	1:32.69	2 Q	1:31.60	2 QA	1:31.32	4
Mike McMillen; Andrew Nicholson; Chris Nicholson; Tony Smith	Men's 5000 m relay	—N/a		7:21.31	1 Q	7:22.38	2 QA	7:18.91	4
