= List of flag bearers for Australasia at the Olympics =

Australasia at the Olympics
- Australasian Olympic Flag
- IOC code: ANZ
- Medals: Gold 3 Silver 4 Bronze 5 Total 12

Summer appearances
- 1908; 1912

Other related appearances
- Australia (1896–1904, 1920–); New Zealand (1920–)

This is a list of flag bearers who have represented Australasia at the Olympics.

Flag bearers carry the national flag of their country at the opening ceremony of the Olympic Games.

| # | Event year | Season | Flag bearer | Sport |
|---|---|---|---|---|
| 1 | 1908 | Summer | Henry Murray | Athletics |
| 2 | 1912 | Summer | Malcolm Champion | Swimming |

== See also ==
- Australasia at the Olympics
- List of flag bearers for Australia at the Olympics
- List of flag bearers for New Zealand at the Olympics
