= Herbert Familton =

New Zealand alpine skier (1928–2002)

Herbert Edward Jepson (Herb or Herbie) Familton (31 March 1928 – 19 May 2002) was an alpine skier from New Zealand. He competed for New Zealand at the 1952 Winter Olympics at Oslo. He came 77th in the Giant Slalom, despite a severely broken thumb. He had gone as a travelling reserve, and replaced the team captain Roy McKenzie, who withdrew because of injury. The family said that it was a lifetime source of satisfaction to him that he beat all the Australians.

He was a foundation member of the North Otago Ski Club (now known as Waitaki Ski Club), and helped develop Awakino Ski Area. He also took part in tennis, yachting, game shooting and gliding. He played the violin then viola, and was a stalwart of the Oamaru operatic and concert orchestras.

He was educated at Oamaru South School, Waitaki Boys' High School and Lincoln College where he got a diploma. He was an insurance and real estate agent, sharebroker and auctioneer in the family firm of J. D. Familton and Sons of Oamaru.

He was born in Oamaru and died in Dunedin Hospital, leaving his wife Valerie, two daughters and a son.

== Sources ==
- Skier first Kiwi in Winter Olympics: Obituary in The Otago Daily Times (Dunedin) of 13 July 2002, p. A35
- North Otago skiing personality: Obituary in The Press (Christchurch) of 13 July 2002, p. D9
