= New Zealand at the Olympics =

- IOC code: NZL
- NOC: New Zealand Olympic Committee
- Website: www.olympic.org.nz
- Medals Ranked 25th: Gold 65 Silver 44 Bronze 57 Total 166

Summer appearances
- 1908; 1912; 1920; 1924; 1928; 1932; 1936; 1948; 1952; 1956; 1960; 1964; 1968; 1972; 1976; 1980; 1984; 1988; 1992; 1996; 2000; 2004; 2008; 2012; 2016; 2020; 2024; 2028

Winter appearances
- 1952; 1956; 1960; 1964; 1968; 1972; 1976; 1980; 1984; 1988; 1992; 1994; 1998; 2002; 2006; 2010; 2014; 2018; 2022; 2026

Other related appearances
- Australasia (1908–1912)

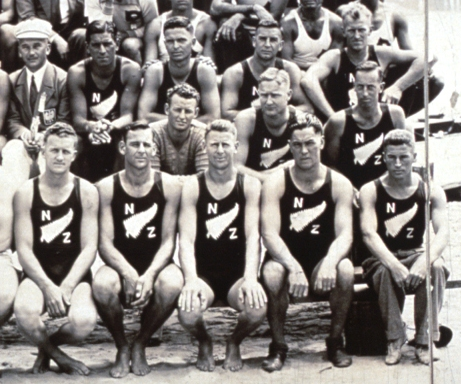
The New Zealand rowing team at the 1932 Summer Olympics

New Zealand first sent an independent team to the Olympics in 1920. Before this, at the 1908 and 1912 Summer Olympics, New Zealand and Australian athletes competed together in a combined Australasia team. New Zealand has also participated in most Winter Olympic Games since 1952, missing only the 1956 and 1964 Games.

The New Zealand Olympic Committee (NZOC) is the National Olympic Committee for New Zealand. The NZOC was founded in 1911, and recognised by the IOC in 1919.

New Zealand athletes have won a total of 166 medals, with 157 won at the Summer Games and nine at the Winter Games. The most successful sport has been rowing with 33 medals, with athletics second with 28 medals. Before the 2022 Winter Olympics, the 166 medals won by New Zealand put the country at number 32 on the all-time Olympic Games medal table for total number of medals and number 24 when weighted by medal type.

Following the 2020 Summer Olympics, 1519 competitors represented New Zealand at the Olympic Games. Harry Kerr is considered the first Kiwi Olympian and Adrian Blincoe the 1000th. On 11 June 2009 it was reported that of the 1111 Olympians to that date, 114 were deceased and the whereabouts of 21 were unknown. By 25 June 2009, only 9 Olympians had not been located. There are no living Kiwi Olympians from before the 1956 Olympics in Melbourne.

== New Zealand at the Summer Games ==
The first person from New Zealand to compete at the Olympic Games was Victor Lindberg, who was a member of the Osborne Swimming Club, which represented Great Britain in water polo at the 1900 Summer Olympics and won gold.

Three New Zealanders won medals competing for Australasian teams in 1908 and 1912. New Zealand sent its first independent team to the VII Olympiad in 1920, comprising two runners, a rower, and a 15-year-old swimmer.

Due to its location in the South Pacific and distance from the early Olympic host cities in Europe and North America, New Zealanders needed to undertake long sea voyages to participate. Since the advent of international jet air travel in the 1950s, and the greater number of Olympic sports, the size of New Zealand Olympic teams has increased substantially. New Zealand, like other Southern Hemisphere countries, has had the disadvantage of needing to peak to compete in summer sports that are held during their winter months. Only three Olympics have been held in the Southern Hemisphere, the 1956 Summer Olympics in Melbourne, the 2000 Summer Olympics in Sydney, and the 2016 Summer Olympics in Rio de Janeiro.

New Zealand's participation in the 1976 Games was controversial, and led to a boycott of the Games by most African countries, who protested against sporting contacts between the All Blacks and apartheid South Africa.

== New Zealand at the Winter Games ==
New Zealand has had a much smaller participation in the Winter Olympics, owing to its oceanic climate and Southern Hemisphere location requiring athletes to peak in the middle of the New Zealand summer. The nation did not assemble its first Winter Olympic team until 1952. In 1988 the team included bobsleighers; the first entry in a winter sport other than alpine skiing.

In 1992, Annelise Coberger of New Zealand became the first person from the Southern Hemisphere to win a medal at the Winter Olympics when she won silver in the slalom at Albertville in France.

In 2018, Zoi Sadowski-Synnott won New Zealand's second Winter Olympic medal in the inaugural big air snowboarding competition in Pyeongchang, South Korea, winning bronze. Later on the same day, 16-year-old Nico Porteous won New Zealand's third Winter Olympic medal in the men's ski halfpipe, also taking bronze.

Four years later in 2022, Zoi Sadowski-Synnott also won New Zealand's first-ever Winter Olympics gold medal, in the women's slopestyle. Nico Porteous later won New Zealand’s second-ever Winter Olympics gold medal, again in the men’s ski half pipe.

== Athlete selection and sport funding ==
Athletes are chosen by the national sporting bodies and nominated to the NZOC for selection. The selection process was overhauled after the disappointing performance at the 2000 Summer Olympics in Sydney, Australia, where the 151 New Zealand athletes returned with just four medals (one gold and three bronze). The NZOC devised rules by which an athlete would only be selected if they had a chance to reach the final 16 in an Olympic competition. It also resulted in an overhaul of the way high-performance sport is funded, with Sport and Recreation New Zealand (SPARC) set up to change from a block funding model to targeted investments. This also forced some sporting bodies to amalgamate as SPARC would only deal with one funding body per sport.

== Timeline of participation ==
Olympic Year/s	Teams	
1896–1900	Australia	
1904	Australia	
1908–1912	Australasia	
1920–present	Australia	New Zealand

== Medal tables ==
=== Medals by Summer Games ===
Games	Athletes	Gold	Silver	Bronze	Total	Rank
(United Kingdom) 1908 London	as part of Australasia					
(Sweden) 1912 Stockholm	as part of Australasia					
(Belgium) 1920 Antwerp	4	0	0	1	1	22
(French Third Republic) 1924 Paris	4	0	0	1	1	23
(Netherlands) 1928 Amsterdam	10	1	0	0	1	24
(United States) 1932 Los Angeles	21	0	1	0	1	22
(Nazi Germany) 1936 Berlin	7	1	0	0	1	20
(United Kingdom) 1948 London	7	0	0	0	0	–
(Finland) 1952 Helsinki	14	1	0	2	3	24
(Australia) 1956 Melbourne	53	2	0	0	2	16
(Italy) 1960 Rome	37	2	0	1	3	14
(Japan) 1964 Tokyo	64	3	0	2	5	12
1968 Mexico City	52	1	0	2	3	27
(West Germany) 1972 Munich	89	1	1	1	3	23
(Canada) 1976 Montreal	80	2	1	1	4	18
(Soviet Union) 1980 Moscow	4	0	0	0	0	–
(United States) 1984 Los Angeles	130	8	1	2	11	8
(South Korea) 1988 Seoul	83	3	2	8	13	18
(Spain) 1992 Barcelona	134	1	4	5	10	28
(United States) 1996 Atlanta	97	3	2	1	6	26
(Australia) 2000 Sydney	151	1	0	3	4	46
(Greece) 2004 Athens	148	3	2	0	5	24
(China) 2008 Beijing	182	3	2	4	9	25
(United Kingdom) 2012 London	184	6	2	5	13	15
(Brazil) 2016 Rio de Janeiro	199	4	9	5	18	19
(Japan) 2020 Tokyo	213	7	6	7	20	20
(France) 2024 Paris	195	10	7	3	20	11
(United States) 2028 Los Angeles	future event					
(Australia) 2032 Brisbane	future event					
Total (25/30)	2,162	63	40	54	157	22

=== Medals by Winter Games ===
Games	Athletes	Gold	Silver	Bronze	Total	Rank
(Norway) 1952 Oslo	3	0	0	0	0	–
(Italy) 1956 Cortina d'Ampezzo	did not participate					
(United States) 1960 Squaw Valley	4	0	0	0	0	–
(Austria) 1964 Innsbruck	did not participate					
(France) 1968 Grenoble	6	0	0	0	0	–
(Japan) 1972 Sapporo	2	0	0	0	0	–
(Austria) 1976 Innsbruck	5	0	0	0	0	–
(United States) 1980 Lake Placid	5	0	0	0	0	–
(Socialist Federal Republic of Yugoslavia) 1984 Sarajevo	6	0	0	0	0	–
(Canada) 1988 Calgary	9	0	0	0	0	–
(France) 1992 Albertville	6	0	1	0	1	17
(Norway) 1994 Lillehammer	7	0	0	0	0	–
(Japan) 1998 Nagano	8	0	0	0	0	–
(United States) 2002 Salt Lake City	10	0	0	0	0	–
(Italy) 2006 Turin	18	0	0	0	0	–
(Canada) 2010 Vancouver	16	0	0	0	0	–
(Russia) 2014 Sochi	15	0	0	0	0	–
(South Korea) 2018 Pyeongchang	21	0	0	2	2	26
(China) 2022 Beijing	15	2	1	0	3	17
(Italy) 2026 Milano Cortina	17	0	2	1	3	22
(France) 2030 French Alps	future event					
(United States) 2034 Utah	future event					
Total (18/25)	173	2	4	3	9	34

=== Medals by summer sport ===
Leading in that sport

Sport	Gold	Silver	Bronze	Total
Rowing	15	7	11	33
Canoeing	14	3	2	19
Athletics	11	4	13	28
Sailing	9	9	7	25
Cycling	3	7	5	15
Equestrian	3	2	5	10
Rugby sevens	2	2	0	4
Swimming	2	1	3	6
Triathlon	1	2	2	5
Boxing	1	1	2	4
Golf	1	1	1	3
Field hockey	1	0	0	1
Shooting	0	1	1	2
Gymnastics	0	0	1	1
Tennis	0	0	1	1
Totals (15 entries)	63	40	54	157

=== Medals by winter sport ===
Sport	Gold	Silver	Bronze	Total
Snowboarding	1	3	1	5
Freestyle skiing	1	0	2	3
Alpine skiing	0	1	0	1
Totals (3 entries)	2	4	3	9

== Summary by sport ==
=== Rowing ===
Games	No. Sailors	Events	Gold	Silver	Bronze	Total	Ranking
1896 Athens	Not held						
1900 Paris	0	0/5 / (a)	0	0	0	0	
1904 St Louis	0	0/5 / (a)	0	0	0	0	
1908 London	0	0/5 / (a)	0	0	0	0	
1912 Stockholm	0	0/4 / (a)	0	0	0	0	
1916	Games Cancelled						
1920 Antwerp	1	1/5	0	0	1	1	7
1924 Paris	0	0/7	0	0	0	0	
1928 Amsterdam	0	0/7	0	0	0	0	
1932 Los Angeles	16	3/7	0	1	0	1	7
1936 Berlin	0	0/7	0	0	0	0	
1940	Games Cancelled						
1944	Games Cancelled						
1948 London	0	0/7	0	0	0	0	
1952 Helsinki	5	1/7	0	0	0	0	
1956 Melbourne	8	3/7	0	0	0	0	
1960 Rome	1	1/7	0	0	0	0	
1964 Tokyo	15	3/7	0	0	0	0	
1968 Mexico City	14	2/7	1	0	0	1	6
1972 Munich	19	4/7	1	1	0	2	3
1976 Montreal	18	3/14	0	0	1	1	10=
1980	0	0/14	0	0	0	0	
1984 Los Angeles	22	6/14	1	0	1	2	5
1988	15	5/14	0	0	3	3	13
1992 Barcelona	12	4/14	0	0	0	0	
1996 Atlanta	11	5/14	0	0	0	0	
2000 Sydney	2	2/14	1	0	0	1	6=
2004 Athens	11	5/14	1	0	0	1	7=
2008 Beijing	16	8/14	1	0	2	3	8
2012 London	26	11/14	3	0	2	5	2
2016 Rio	38	11/14	2	1	0	3	2
2020 Tokyo	30	8/14	3	2	0	5	1
2024 Paris	20	9/14	1	2	1	4	4
Total	300	264	15	7	11	33	6

=== Sailing ===
Games	No. Sailors	Events	Gold	Silver	Bronze	Total	Ranking
1896	Scheduled but event wasn't held						
1900	0	0/13	0	0	0	0	
1904	Not Scheduled						
1908	0	0/4	0	0	0	0	
1912	0	0/4	0	0	0	0	
1916	Games Cancelled						
1920	0	0/14	0	0	0	0	
1924	0	0/3	0	0	0	0	
1928	0	0/3	0	0	0	0	
1932	0	0/4	0	0	0	0	
1936	0	0/4	0	0	0	0	
1940	Games Cancelled						
1944	Games Cancelled						
1948	0	0/5	0	0	0	0	
1952	0	0/5	0	0	0	0	
1956	5	2/5	1	0	0	1	4
1960	3	2/5	0	0	0	0	
1964	3	2/5	1	0	0	1	3
1968	3	2/5	0	0	0	0	
1972	9	4/6	0	0	0	0	
1976	8	4/6	0	0	0	0	
1980	0	0/6	0	0	0	0	
1984	11	6/7	2	0	1	3	2
1988	13	7/8	1	1	1	3	3
1992	17	10/10	1	2	1	4	4
1996	16	10/10	0	1	0	1	12
2000	18	11/11	0	0	2	2	12
2004	12	8/11	0	0	0	0	
2008	9	7/11	1	0	0	1	6
2012	15	9/10	1	1	0	2	5
2016	12	7/10	1	2	1	4	4
2020	10	6/10	0	1	0	1	11=
2024	12	9/10	0	1	1	2	8=
Total	176	106 / 205	9	9	7	25	6

== See also ==
- List of flag bearers for New Zealand at the Olympics
- List of New Zealand Olympic medallists
- Category:Olympic competitors for New Zealand
- New Zealand Olympic Committee
- New Zealand at the Paralympics
