= Anna Archibald =

New Zealand alpine skier (born 1959)

Anna Archibald (born 14 September 1959) is a retired alpine skier from Christchurch, New Zealand.

Archibald was a New Zealand alpine champion in 1977 and 1978. She competed for New Zealand at the 1980 Winter Olympics, finishing 26th, a position which is still the equal best finish position of any New Zealand Olympic downhiller.
