= Blair Telford =

New Zealand bobsledder

Personal information
- Full name: Blair Stuart Telford
- Born: 7 December 1965 (age 60) Wellington, New Zealand
- Occupation: Police officer
- Height: 1.78 m (5 ft 10 in)

Sport
- Country: New Zealand
- Sport: Bobsleigh; Surf lifesaving

Blair Stuart Telford (born 7 December 1965) is a New Zealand former bobsledder, surf lifesaver and police officer. He competed in the two-man and the four-man events at the 1988 Winter Olympics, as part of New Zealand's first bobsled team at a Winter Olympic Games.

== Early life ==
Telford was born in Wellington on 7 December 1965, the youngest of four children. He was educated at Spotswood College in New Plymouth, where he was senior boys' athletics champion in 1982 and 1983, and was also active in volleyball, cross country running and rugby union. He played rugby for New Plymouth Old Boys.

== Sports career ==
=== Surf lifesaving ===
Telford was prominent in the sport of surf lifesaving. At the 1984 New Zealand national surf lifesaving championships, he won the junior beach sprint, and later that year he was named in the New Zealand team to face Australia in a trans-Tasman test at Mount Maunganui the following January. In February 1985, he was a member of the Rest of the World surf lifesaving team that competed against the Australian team at the Australia Games. The Australians were heavily favoured, particularly in the non-water events. Despite having no previous experience in the flags event at senior level, Telford finished a very close second in that event. In the beach sprint, he led the world champion, Warren Peters, for most of the 100-metre race, before being beaten on the line. Telford was a member of the World foursome that won the rescue tube race. It was reported that "Telford's tenacity exemplified the enthusiasm and determination of the World team, despite their lack of experience in Australian conditions".

Telford was a member of the New Plymouth Old Boys' Surf Life Saving Club team at the 1987 New Zealand national surf lifesaving championships. In the open beach relay race, he was just beaten on the line as his team won the silver medal.

=== Bobsleigh ===
In December 1987, Telford was one of four men selected in New Zealand's first bobsled team for the Winter Olympics in 1988. He was named as a crewman in the four-man bob and a reserve brakeman for the two-man bob. The New Zealand Bobsleigh and Skeleton Association was only formed earlier in 1987, and most of the team members had never been in a sled before they assembled for training in Calgary, Canada, in October that year. After showing satisfactory results in Olympic pre-event training for the two-man bobsleigh, Telford and Owen Pinnell were allowed to compete in the Olympic two-man competition, and they finished in 35th place out of the 41 teams competing. Their time of 58.86 seconds for their third run, on day 2 of the event, was the fastest of the 27 starters who completed a run before competition was abandoned for the day and the runs wiped. In the four-man bobsleigh, the New Zealand team of Lex Peterson, Telford, Rhys Dacre and Peter Henry finished 21st overall.

Later in 1988, Telford was brakeman with Darryl Fergus as driver in one of New Zealand's three two-man bobs at the Calgary World Cup event, finishing 18th out of 25 sleds. Telford spent about four years competing on the World Cup circuit in North America and Europe.

=== Beach volleyball ===
In 2004, Telford was a member of the New Zealand Police open mixed four beach volleyball team that won the gold medal at the 10th Australia and New Zealand Police and Emergency Services Games held in Perth.

== Police career ==
After returning from overseas, Telford joined the New Zealand Police. He worked as a constable in New Plymouth for eight years, before transferring to Auckland where he was promoted to sergeant. He then returned to Taranaki a year later, spending two years in Hāwera, before moving to Christchurch and promotion to senior sergeant. In 2007, he rose to the rank of inspector, stationed in Wellington where he was in charge of strategy and policy at Police National Headquarters. In 2010, Telford returned to New Plymouth where he was appointed acting area commander. The appointment was made permanent in January 2011. Following the amalgamation of the Taranaki rural and New Plymouth police areas in 2013, Telford was appointed area commander for the new combined Taranaki regional police area.

Telford was part of the security support team at the 2012 Summer Olympics in London, assisting with security and safety at the Olympic rowing venue at Eton Dorney. Two years later, he joined the security team at the 2014 Commonwealth Games in Glasgow. Following the games, he was seconded to Wellington for an initial three months, where he filled the role of police private secretary to the Minister of Police, assisting with the transition between ministers; the secondment was subsequently extended and Telford stepped down as Taranaki area commander in December 2014.

In summer 2016–2017, Telford completed Te Araroa, a long-distance tramping trail that runs the length of New Zealand, covering the 3,000 kilometres (1,900 mi) in 107 days.

Telford holds a master's degree in management from an Australian university, and a diploma in leadership from the University of Otago. He retired from the police after 28 years' service, and became a training consultant based in New Plymouth with a company providing safety and tactical communications training.
