= New Zealand at the 2014 Winter Olympics =

- IOC code: NZL
- NOC: New Zealand Olympic Committee
- Website: www.olympic.org.nz

in Sochi
- Competitors: 15 in 5 sports
- Flag bearers: Shane Dobbin (opening); Jossi Wells (closing)
- Medals: Gold 0 Silver 0 Bronze 0 Total 0

Winter Olympics appearances (overview)
- 1952; 1956; 1960; 1964; 1968; 1972; 1976; 1980; 1984; 1988; 1992; 1994; 1998; 2002; 2006; 2010; 2014; 2018; 2022; 2026; 2030

New Zealand competed at the 2014 Winter Olympics in Sochi, Russia from 7 to 23 February 2014. The team consisted of 15 competitors in five sports. Only three members had prior Olympic Games experience (Dobbin, Sandford and Sinclair).

For the sixth games in a row, the country did not win any medals. The best result was a fourth place to Jossi Wells in the men's halfpipe.

== Alpine skiing ==
Athlete	Event	Run 1		Run 2		Total	
Athlete	Event	Time	Rank	Time	Rank	Time	Rank
Adam Barwood	Men's giant slalom	1:28.51	49	1:28.89	43	2:57.40	44
Adam Barwood	Men's slalom	54.21	50	1:01.97	25	1:56.18	25

== Freestyle skiing ==
Men

Athlete	Event	Qualification				Final			
Athlete	Event	Run 1	Run 2	Best	Rank	Run 1	Run 2	Best	Rank
Lyndon Sheehan	Halfpipe	78.20	80.00	80.00	8 Q	55.20	72.60	72.60	9
Beau-James Wells	Halfpipe	76.80	66.40	76.80	10 Q	62.00	80.00	80.00	6
Byron Wells	Halfpipe	DNS				Did not advance			
Jossi Wells	Halfpipe	83.00	49.40	83.00	5 Q	85.60	78.40	85.60	4
Beau-James Wells	Slopestyle	36.00	66.60	66.60	21	Did not advance			
Jossi Wells	Slopestyle	82.80	83.40	83.40	10 Q	60.60	50.00	60.60	11

Women

Athlete	Event	Qualification				Final			
Athlete	Event	Run 1	Run 2	Best	Rank	Run 1	Run 2	Best	Rank
Janina Kuzma	Halfpipe	73.80	75.20	75.20	7 Q	77.00	74.80	77.00	5
Anna Willcox-Silfverberg	Slopestyle	62.40	34.40	62.40	15	Did not advance			

== Skeleton ==
Athlete	Event	Run 1		Run 2		Run 3		Run 4		Total	
Athlete	Event	Time	Rank	Time	Rank	Time	Rank	Time	Rank	Time	Rank
Ben Sandford	Men's	58.00	22	57.75	20	57.79	18	57.67	18	3:51.21	20
Katharine Eustace	Women's	59.52	14	59.46	16	58.69	11	58.54	13	3:56.21	=11

== Snowboarding ==
Athlete	Event	Qualification				Semifinal				Final			
Athlete	Event	Run 1	Run 2	Best	Rank	Run 1	Run 2	Best	Rank	Run 1	Run 2	Best	Rank
Rebecca Sinclair	Women's halfpipe	32.25	48.25	48.25	11	Did not advance							
Shelly Gotlieb	Women's slopestyle	18.00	30.75	30.75	11 QS	63.25	33.75	63.25	7	Did not advance			
Stefi Luxton	Women's slopestyle	59.75	34.25	59.75	8 QS	18.25	60.25	60.25	8	Did not advance			
Christy Prior	Women's slopestyle	67.50	70.50	70.50	7 QS	DNS				Did not advance			
Rebecca Torr	Women's slopestyle	70.75	33.75	70.75	6 QS	27.25	32.50	32.50	10	Did not advance			

Qualification Legend: QF – Qualify directly to final; QS – Qualify to semifinal

== Speed skating ==
Athlete	Event	Final	
Athlete	Event	Time	Rank
Shane Dobbin	Men's 5000 m	6:26.90	14
Shane Dobbin	Men's 10,000 m	13:16.42	7
