= Mickey Ross =

New Zealand alpine skier (born 1980)

Michael James (Mickey) Ross (born 1980) is an alpine skier from New Zealand.

In the 2006 Winter Olympics at Turin, he came 31st in the Slalom. He was the top finisher of the New Zealand alpine skiers despite a fall in the first run.

He now resides in Wānaka on New Zealand's South Island, where he works as a photographer and part-time model.
