= New Zealand at the 1984 Winter Olympics =

- IOC code: NZL
- NOC: New Zealand Olympic Committee
- Website: www.olympic.org.nz

in Sarajevo
- Competitors: 6 (4 men and 2 women) in 1 sport
- Flag bearer: Markus Hubrich (alpine skiing)
- Medals Ranked —th: Gold 0 Silver 0 Bronze 0 Total 0

Winter Olympics appearances (overview)
- 1952; 1956; 1960; 1964; 1968; 1972; 1976; 1980; 1984; 1988; 1992; 1994; 1998; 2002; 2006; 2010; 2014; 2018; 2022; 2026; 2030

New Zealand competed at the 1984 Winter Olympics in Sarajevo, Yugoslavia.

== Alpine skiing ==
Men

Athlete	Event	Race 1		Race 2		Total	
Athlete	Event	Time	Rank	Time	Rank	Time	Rank
Markus Hubrich	Downhill					1:50.77	35
Bruce Grant	Downhill					1:49.94	31
Simon Wi Rutene	Giant Slalom	1:30.13	41	1:28.97	35	2:59.10	36
Markus Hubrich	Giant Slalom	1:25.81	30	1:26.98	30	2:52.79	29
Mattias Hubrich	Slalom	58.63	29	55.73	20	1:54.36	17
Markus Hubrich	Slalom	56.75	25	52.78	14	1:49.53	14

Women

Athlete	Event	Race 1		Race 2		Total	
Athlete	Event	Time	Rank	Time	Rank	Time	Rank
Kate Rattray	Downhill					1:20.18	29
Christine Grant	Downhill					1:17.52	26
Kate Rattray	Giant Slalom	1:14.67	42	DNF	–	DNF	–

== See also ==
- New Zealand at the 1984 Winter Paralympics
