= Kate Rattray =

New Zealand alpine skier (born 1962)

Katharine Jane (Kate) Rattray (born 1962) is an alpine skier from New Zealand.

In the 1984 Winter Olympics at Sarajevo, she came 29th in the Downhill.

In the 1988 Winter Olympics at Calgary, she came 21st in the Slalom, and 28th in the Super G.
