= Michael Dennis (skier) =

New Zealand alpine skier (born 1944)

Michael Dennis (born August 31, 1944) is an alpine skier from New Zealand.

In the 1968 Winter Olympics at Grenoble, he came 74th in the Giant Slalom.
