= New Zealand at the 1960 Winter Olympics =

- IOC code: NZL (NZE used at these Games)
- NOC: New Zealand Olympic Committee
- Website: www.olympic.org.nz

in Squaw Valley
- Competitors: 4 (2 men, 2 women) in 1 sport
- Flag bearer: Bill Hunt
- Medals: Gold 0 Silver 0 Bronze 0 Total 0

Winter Olympics appearances (overview)
- 1952; 1956; 1960; 1964; 1968; 1972; 1976; 1980; 1984; 1988; 1992; 1994; 1998; 2002; 2006; 2010; 2014; 2018; 2022; 2026

New Zealand competed at the 1960 Winter Olympics in Squaw Valley, United States. The country was represented by its Alpine skiing team of Bill Hunt, Cecelia Womersley, Patricia Prain, and Sam Chaffey. No medals were earned.

== Alpine skiing ==
Men

Athlete	Event	Race 1		Race 2		Total	
Athlete	Event	Time	Rank	Time	Rank	Time	Rank
Bill Hunt	Downhill					2:32.0	54
Sam Chaffey	Downhill					2:29.3	48
Sam Chaffey	Giant Slalom					2:32.3	58
Bill Hunt	Giant Slalom					2:23.3	51
Bill Hunt	Slalom	DSQ	–	–	–	DSQ	–
Sam Chaffey	Slalom	DSQ	–	–	–	DSQ	–

Women

Athlete	Event	Race 1		Race 2		Total	
Athlete	Event	Time	Rank	Time	Rank	Time	Rank
Trish Prain	Downhill					2:01.5	36
Cecilia Womersley	Downhill					1:59.5	34
Trish Prain	Giant Slalom					1:52.4	34
Cecilia Womersley	Giant Slalom					1:47.7	27
Cecilia Womersley	Slalom	2:17.7	41	1:25.4	35	3:43.1	38
Trish Prain	Slalom	1:05.5	29	1:12.9	32	2:18.4	32
