= Scott Kendall =

New Zealand alpine skier (born 1959)

Scott Kendall (born 1959) is an alpine skier from New Zealand.

In the 1980 Winter Olympics at Lake Placid, he came 26th in the Slalom.

His brother Brett Kendall competed at the 1976 Winter Olympics.
