= Nicola Campbell =

New Zealand alpine skier (born 1985)

- Born: 1985; Dunedin, New Zealand
- Height: 164 cm (5 ft 5 in)

Nicola Jane Campbell (born 1985) is an alpine skier from New Zealand.

In the 2006 Winter Olympics at Turin. She came 35th out of 64 in the Slalom.
