= Haubrich =

Haubrich is a surname. Notable people with the surname include:

- Josef Haubrich (1889–1961), German lawyer and art collector
- Joseph G. Haubrich (born 1958), American economist
- József Haubrich (1883–1939), Hungarian politician
- Tess Haubrich (born 1990), Australian actress

== See also ==
- Hubrich
