= New Zealand at the 2010 Winter Olympics =

- IOC code: NZL
- NOC: New Zealand Olympic Committee
- Website: www.olympic.org.nz

in Vancouver
- Competitors: 16 in 8 sports
- Flag bearers: Juliane Bray (opening); Ben Sandford (closing)
- Medals: Gold 0 Silver 0 Bronze 0 Total 0

Winter Olympics appearances (overview)
- 1952; 1956; 1960; 1964; 1968; 1972; 1976; 1980; 1984; 1988; 1992; 1994; 1998; 2002; 2006; 2010; 2014; 2018; 2022; 2026; 2030

New Zealand participated at the 2010 Winter Olympics in Vancouver, British Columbia, Canada. 16 athletes were named by 28 January 2010.

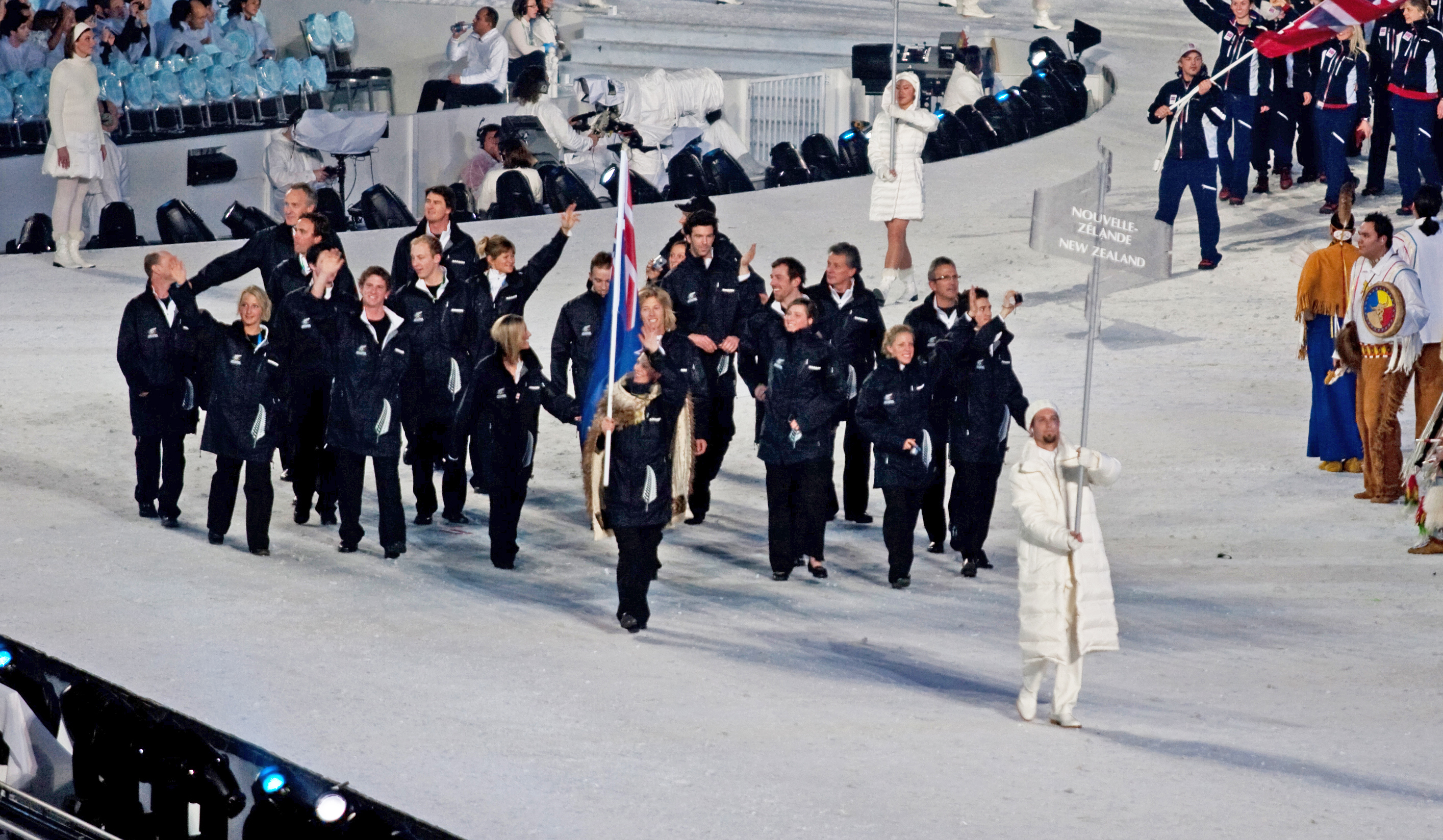
The athletes entering the stadium during the opening ceremonies.

== Alpine skiing ==
Athlete	Event	Run 1	Run 2	Total	Rank
Tim Cafe	Super-G	1:35.55			38
Ben Griffin	Super-G	DNF			n/a
Ben Griffin	Giant slalom	DNF	did not advance		n/a

== Biathlon ==
Athlete	Event	Final		
Athlete	Event	Time	Misses	Rank
Sarah Murphy	Sprint	23:49.7	2+1	82
Sarah Murphy	Individual	52:54.9	1+2+0+3	82

== Cross-country skiing ==
Athlete	Event	Qualification		Quarterfinals		Semifinals		Final	
Athlete	Event	Time	Rank	Time	Rank	Time	Rank	Time	Rank
Katherine Calder	Women's sprint	4:03.11	47	did not advance					47
Katherine Calder	Women's 10 km freestyle							28:50.9	63
Katherine Calder	Women's 15 km pursuit							DNS	
Ben Koons	Men's 15 km freestyle							DNS	
Ben Koons	Men's 30 km pursuit							LAP	56
Ben Koons	Men's 50 km classical								53

== Freestyle skiing ==
Athlete	Event	Qualifying		1/8 Final	Quarterfinal	Semifinal	Final	
Athlete	Event	Points/Time	Rank	Rank	Rank	Rank	Points	Rank
Mitchey Greig	Women's ski cross	1:22.52	30 Q	4	did not advance			30

== Short track speed skating ==
Athlete	Event	Heat		Quarterfinal		Semifinal		Final		Ranking
Athlete	Event	Time	Rank	Time	Rank	Time	Rank	Time	Rank	Ranking
Blake Skjellerup	Men's 500 m	42.510	3	did not advance						
Blake Skjellerup	Men's 1000 m	1:27.875	2 Q	1:27.374	4	did not advance				
Blake Skjellerup	Men's 1500 m	2:14.730	5			did not advance				

== Skeleton ==
Athlete	Event	Final					
Athlete	Event	Run 1	Run 2	Run 3	Run 4	Total	Rank
Iain Roberts	Men's	55.21	57.58	DNS			
Ben Sandford	Men's	53.11	53.32	52.90	53.26	3:32.59	11
Tionette Stoddard	Women's	55.85	55.93	55.02	54.89	3:41.69	14

== Snowboarding ==
Men's halfpipe

Athlete	Qualification			Semifinals			Finals		
Athlete	Run 1	Run 2	Rank	Run 1	Run 2	Rank	Run 1	Run 2	Rank
Mitch Brown	18.4	15.2	18	did not advance					
James Hamilton	5.2	28.0	10	did not advance					

Women's halfpipe

Athlete	Qualification			Semifinals			Finals		
Athlete	Run 1	Run 2	Rank	Run 1	Run 2	Rank	Run 1	Run 2	Rank
Juliane Bray	17.8	15.5	24	did not advance					
Kendall Brown	11.4	29.5	16 QS	33.3	28.2	9	did not advance		
Rebecca Sinclair	14.7	23.7	21	did not advance					

== Speed skating ==
Athlete	Event	Race 1		Race 2		Final	
Athlete	Event	Time	Rank	Time	Rank	Time	Rank
Shane Dobbin	Men's 5000 m					6:33.38	17

== See also ==
- New Zealand at the 2010 Winter Paralympics
