= Todd Haywood =

New Zealand alpine skier (born 1977)

Todd Mitchell Haywood (born 1977) is an alpine skier from New Zealand.

In the 2002 Winter Olympics at Salt Lake City he came 51st in the Slalom.
