= New Zealand at the 2018 Winter Olympics =

- IOC code: NZL
- NOC: New Zealand Olympic Committee
- Website: www.olympics.org.nz

in Pyeongchang, South Korea 9–25 February 2018
- Competitors: 21 in 5 sports
- Flag bearer (opening): Beau-James Wells
- Flag bearer (closing): Zoi Sadowski-Synnott
- Medals Ranked 26th: Gold 0 Silver 0 Bronze 2 Total 2

Winter Olympics appearances (overview)
- 1952; 1956; 1960; 1964; 1968; 1972; 1976; 1980; 1984; 1988; 1992; 1994; 1998; 2002; 2006; 2010; 2014; 2018; 2022; 2026

New Zealand competed at the 2018 Winter Olympics in Pyeongchang, South Korea, from 9 to 25 February 2018. The team consisted of 21 athletes, 17 men and 4 women, across five sports.

The team collected two bronze medals, which made these games the most successful Winter Games for New Zealand; the nation had previously collected only one Winter Olympic medal, a silver at the 1992 Games. The two medals also exceeded High Performance Sport New Zealand's target of one medal for the Games.

The two bronze medals were won by Zoi Sadowski-Synnott in the women's snowboarding big air and by Nico Porteous in the men's ski halfpipe. Porteous at 16 years 91 days and Sadowski-Synnott at 16 years 353 days became the nation's two youngest Olympic medallists, breaking the previous record of 17 years 100 days set by Danyon Loader at the 1992 Summer Olympics.

== Medallists ==
| Medal | Name | Sport | Event | Date |
|---|---|---|---|---|
| Bronze | Zoi Sadowski-Synnott | Snowboarding | Women's big air | 22 February |
| Bronze | Nico Porteous | Freestyle skiing | Men's halfpipe | 22 February |

== Competitors ==
The New Zealand Olympic Committee (NZOC) confirmed a team of 21 athletes, 17 men and 4 women, to compete in five sports. It is the largest delegation New Zealand has sent to the Winter Olympics, surpassing the 18 athletes who were sent to the 2006 Winter Olympics in Torino. The nation participated in the same sports as at the 2014 Winter Olympics.

Sixteen-year-old alpine skier Alice Robinson was New Zealand's youngest competitor; along with fellow 16-year-olds Nico Porteous and Zoi Sadowski-Synnott, the three were the first New Zealand Olympians at either Games to be born in the 21st century. 38-year-old speed skater Shane Dobbin was the oldest competitor.

| Sport | Men | Women | Total |
|---|---|---|---|
| Alpine skiing | 2 | 1 | 3 |
| Freestyle skiing | 7 | 2 | 9 |
| Skeleton | 1 | 0 | 1 |
| Snowboarding | 4 | 1 | 5 |
| Speed skating | 3 | 0 | 3 |
| Total | 17 | 4 | 21 |

== Alpine skiing ==
New Zealand qualified two alpine skiers, one male and one female, through the basic quota. They also received one additional quota.

| Athlete | Event | Run 1 | | Run 2 | | Total | |
| Athlete | Event | Time | Rank | Time | Rank | Time | Rank |
|---|---|---|---|---|---|---|---|
| Adam Barwood | Men's giant slalom | 1:13.41 | 40 | 1:13.81 | 35 | 2:27.22 | 34 |
| Adam Barwood | Men's slalom | DNF | | | | | |
| Adam Barwood | Men's super-G | —N/a | | | | 1:31.10 | 43 |
| Willis Feasey | Men's giant slalom | 1:14.48 | 42 | 1:13.80 | 34 | 2:28.28 | 36 |
| Willis Feasey | Men's slalom | DNF | | | | | |
| Willis Feasey | Men's super-G | —N/a | | | | 1:28.59 | 37 |
| Alice Robinson | Women's giant slalom | 1:16.66 | 37 | 1:14.53 | 38 | 2:31.19 | 35 |
| Alice Robinson | Women's slalom | DNF | | | | | |

== Freestyle skiing ==
The NZOC announced the first five freestyle skiers on 24 October 2017, adding another two on 8 November 2017, and a further two on 12 January 2018. Jossi Wells withdrew from participating on 9 January 2018 due to injury.

Halfpipe

| Athlete | Event | Qualification | | | | Final | | | | |
| Athlete | Event | Run 1 | Run 2 | Best | Rank | Run 1 | Run 2 | Run 3 | Best | Rank |
|---|---|---|---|---|---|---|---|---|---|---|
| Miguel Porteous | Men's halfpipe | 40.40 | 62.60 | 62.60 | 17 | did not advance | | | | |
| Nico Porteous | Men's halfpipe | 51.20 | 72.80 | 72.80 | 11 Q | 82.40 | 94.80 | 30.00 | 94.80 | 3rd place, bronze medalist(s) |
| Beau-James Wells | Men's halfpipe | 86.20 | 88.20 | 88.20 | 5 Q | 87.40 | 52.20 | 91.60 | 91.60 | 4 |
| Byron Wells | Men's halfpipe | 88.60 | 42.00 | 88.60 | 4 Q | DNS | | | | |
| Britt Hawes | Women's halfpipe | 52.20 | 57.40 | 57.40 | 21 | did not advance | | | | |
| Janina Kuzma | Women's halfpipe | 67.80 | 48.60 | 67.80 | 16 | did not advance | | | | |

Ski cross

| Athlete | Event | Seeding | | Round of 16 | Quarterfinal | Semifinal | Final | |
| Athlete | Event | Time | Rank | Position | Position | Position | Position | Rank |
|---|---|---|---|---|---|---|---|---|
| Jamie Prebble | Men's ski cross | 1:10.48 | 25 | 3 | did not advance | | | |

Qualification legend: FA – Qualify to medal round; FB – Qualify to consolation round

Slopestyle

| Athlete | Event | Qualification | | | | Final | | | | |
| Athlete | Event | Run 1 | Run 2 | Best | Rank | Run 1 | Run 2 | Run 3 | Best | Rank |
|---|---|---|---|---|---|---|---|---|---|---|
| Finn Bilous | Men's slopestyle | 24.80 | 85.00 | 85.00 | 13 | did not advance | | | | |
| Jackson Wells | Men's slopestyle | 52.80 | 42.00 | 52.80 | 25 | did not advance | | | | |

== Skeleton ==
New Zealand qualified one male skeleton athlete. The NZOC announced the selection of the racer on 19 January 2018.

| Athlete | Event | Run 1 | | Run 2 | | Run 3 | | Run 4 | | Total | |
| Athlete | Event | Time | Rank | Time | Rank | Time | Rank | Time | Rank | Time | Rank |
|---|---|---|---|---|---|---|---|---|---|---|---|
| Rhys Thornbury | Men's | 50.90 | 8 | 51.03 | 10 | 50.65 | 6 | 52.14 | 20 | 3:24.72 | 14 |

== Snowboarding ==
The NZOC announced the first four snowboarders on 24 October 2017.

Freestyle

| Athlete | Event | Qualification | | | | Final | | | | |
| Athlete | Event | Run 1 | Run 2 | Best | Rank | Run 1 | Run 2 | Run 3 | Best | Rank |
|---|---|---|---|---|---|---|---|---|---|---|
| Carlos Garcia Knight | Men's big air | 88.75 | 97.50 | 97.50 | 1 Q | JNS | JNS | 54.25 | 54.25 | 11 |
| Carlos Garcia Knight | Men's slopestyle | 80.10 | 40.20 | 80.10 | 2 Q | 78.60 | 52.98 | 24.35 | 78.60 | 5 |
| Zoi Sadowski-Synnott | Women's big air | 72.75 | 92.00 | 92.00 | 5 Q | 65.50 | 92.00 | JNS | 157.50 | 3rd place, bronze medalist(s) |
| Zoi Sadowski-Synnott | Women's slopestyle | Cancelled | | | | 26.70 | 48.38 | CAN | 48.38 | 13 |
| Rakai Tait | Men's halfpipe | 36.50 | 25.75 | 36.50 | 26 | Did not advance | | | | |

Tiarn Collins also qualified for the men's slopestyle and big air competitions, but was forced to withdraw after dislocated his shoulder in training prior to the start of the games.

Snowboard cross

| Athlete | Event | Seeding | | | | | | 1/8 final | Quarterfinal | Semifinal | Final | |
| Athlete | Event | Run 1 | | Run 2 | | Best | Seed | 1/8 final | Quarterfinal | Semifinal | Final | |
| Athlete | Event | Time | Rank | Time | Rank | Best | Seed | Position | Position | Position | Position | Rank |
|---|---|---|---|---|---|---|---|---|---|---|---|---|
| Duncan Campbell | Men's | 1:16.68 | 32 | DNF | | 1:16.68 | 37 | 5 | did not advance | | | |

== Speed skating ==
Individual

| Athlete | Event | Race | |
| Athlete | Event | Time | Rank |
|---|---|---|---|
| Reyon Kay | Men's 1500 m | 1:47.81 | 26 |
| Peter Michael | Men's 1500 m | 1:46.39 | 14 |
| Peter Michael | Men's 5000 m | 6:14.07 | 4 |

Mass start

| Athlete | Event | Semifinal | | | Final | | |
| Athlete | Event | Points | Time | Rank | Points | Time | Rank |
|---|---|---|---|---|---|---|---|
| Reyon Kay | Men's | 0 | 9:17.99 | 12 | Did not advance | | |
| Peter Michael | Men's | 60 | 7:55.10 | 1 Q | 0 | 7:49.33 | 15 |

Team pursuit

| Athlete | Event | Quarterfinal | | Semifinal | | Final | |
| Athlete | Event | Opposition Time | Rank | Opposition Time | Rank | Opposition Time | Rank |
|---|---|---|---|---|---|---|---|
| Shane Dobbin; Reyon Kay; Peter Michael | Men's | Norway; L 3:41.18 | 4 Q | South Korea; L 3:39.53 | 2 FB | Netherlands; L 3:43.54 | 4 |

== See also ==
- New Zealand at the 2017 Asian Winter Games
- New Zealand at the 2018 Commonwealth Games
