= Jesse Teat =

New Zealand alpine skier (born 1979)

Jesse Teat (born 1979) is an alpine skier from New Zealand.

In the 2002 Winter Olympics at Salt Lake City he came 50th in the Giant Slalom.

Teat has a master's degree from the University of Otago in New Zealand, completed in 2011.
