= Mark Vryenhoek =

New Zealand alpine skier (born 1960)

Mark Vryenhoek (9 January 1960) was an alpine skier from New Zealand. In the 1980 Winter Olympics at Lake Placid he did not finish in the Slalom and Giant Slalom.
