= Robin Armstrong =

New Zealand alpine skier (born 1953)

Robin Armstrong (born 1953) is an alpine skier from New Zealand.

In the 1976 Winter Olympics at Innsbruck he did not finish in the Downhill, Slalom and Giant Slalom.
