= New Zealand at the 2026 Winter Olympics =

- IOC code: NZL
- NOC: New Zealand Olympic Committee
- Website: www.olympic.org.nz

in Milan and Cortina d'Ampezzo, Italy 6–22 February 2026
- Competitors: 17 (11 men and 6 women) in 3 sports
- Flag bearers (opening): Ben Barclay & Zoi Sadowski-Synnott
- Flag bearer (closing): Luca Harrington
- Medals Ranked 22nd: Gold 0 Silver 2 Bronze 1 Total 3

Winter Olympics appearances (overview)
- 1952; 1956; 1960; 1964; 1968; 1972; 1976; 1980; 1984; 1988; 1992; 1994; 1998; 2002; 2006; 2010; 2014; 2018; 2022; 2026

New Zealand competed at the 2026 Winter Olympics in Milan and Cortina d'Ampezzo, Italy, from 6 to 22 February 2026. The team consisting of 17 athletes (11 men and 6 women) was the largest to be sent by New Zealand to a Winter Olympic Games.

Ben Barclay and Zoi Sadowski-Synnott were the country's flagbearers during the opening ceremony. Luca Harrington was the country's flagbearer during the closing ceremony.

== Medallists ==
The following New Zealand competitors won medals at the games. In the discipline sections below, the medallists' names are bolded.

Medal	Name	Sport	Event	Date
Silver	Zoi Sadowski-Synnott	Snowboarding	Women's big air	9 February
Silver	Zoi Sadowski-Synnott	Snowboarding	Women's slopestyle	18 February
Bronze	Luca Harrington	Freestyle skiing	Men's slopestyle	10 February

== Competitors ==
The following is a list of the number of competitors in each sport/discipline.

Sport	Men	Women	Total
Alpine skiing	0	1	1
Freestyle skiing	7	3	10
Snowboarding	4	2	6
Total	11	6	17

== Alpine skiing ==
New Zealand qualified one male and one female alpine skier through the basic quota. The NZOC filled the female slot on 3 October 2025.

Athlete	Event	Run 1		Run 2		Total	
Athlete	Event	Time	Rank	Time	Rank	Time	Rank
Alice Robinson	Women's giant slalom	1:04.32	10	1:09.98	9	2:14.30	8
Alice Robinson	Women's super-G	—N/a				1:24:44	8

== Freestyle skiing ==
On 3 October 2025, the NZOC conditionally selected five freestyle skiers, adding five more on 23 January 2026.

Athlete	Event	Qualification					Final				
Athlete	Event	Run 1	Run 2	Run 3	Best	Rank	Run 1	Run 2	Run 3	Best	Rank
Ruby Star Andrews	Women's big air	44.50	48.25	DNI	92.75	24	Did not advance				
Ruby Star Andrews	Women's slopestyle	38.93	45.83	—N/a	45.83	17	Did not advance				
Lucas Ball	Men's big air	24.75	44.25	90.00	114.75	24	Did not advance				
Lucas Ball	Men's slopestyle	44.91	24.86	—N/a	44.91	20	Did not advance				
Ben Barclay	Men's big air	70.50	69.00	DNI	139.50	19	Did not advance				
Ben Barclay	Men's slopestyle	73.36	65.70	—N/a	73.36	7 **Q**	69.40	17.73	17.56	69.40	8
Ben Harrington	Men's halfpipe	73.50	75.25	—N/a	75.25	12 **Q**	61.25	DNI	73.75	73.75	9
**Luca Harrington**	Men's big air	84.25	92.00	87.75	179.75	5 **Q**	94.00	25.75	66.50	160.50	6
**Luca Harrington**	Men's slopestyle	69.70	22.95	—N/a	69.70	9 **Q**	27.55	35.51	85.15	85.15	3rd place, bronze medalist(s)
Luke Harrold	Men's halfpipe	65.50	DNI	—N/a	65.50	15	Did not advance				
Gustav Legnavsky	Men's halfpipe	13.50	71.00	—N/a	71.00	14	Did not advance				
Finley Melville Ives	Men's halfpipe	16.25	DNI	—N/a	16.25	24	Did not advance				
Mischa Thomas	Women's halfpipe	77.00	77.50	—N/a	77.50	10 **Q**	77.75	DNI	DNI	77.75	8
Sylvia Trotter	Women's big air	83.00	20.75	38.00	121.00	21	Did not advance				
Sylvia Trotter	Women's slopestyle	24.30	35.58	—N/a	35.58	20	Did not advance				

== Snowboarding ==
On 3 October 2025, the NZOC conditionally selected two snowboarders, adding four more on 23 January 2026.

Athlete	Event	Qualification					Final				
Athlete	Event	Run 1	Run 2	Run 3	Best	Rank	Run 1	Run 2	Run 3	Best	Rank
Lyon Farrell	Men's big air	25.50	88.50	81.50	170.00	7 **Q**	83.50	16.50	40.75	124.25	8
Lyon Farrell	Men's slopestyle	68.61	65.80	—N/a	68.61	15	Did not advance				
Lucia Georgalli	Women's big air	78.25	38.75	DNI	117.00	25	Did not advance				
Lucia Georgalli	Women's slopestyle	42.20	50.60	—N/a	50.60	20	Did not advance				
Rocco Jamieson	Men's big air	82.00	83.50	84.75	168.25	8 **Q**	43.00	83.00	29.25	112.25	9
Rocco Jamieson	Men's slopestyle	56.56	42.28	—N/a	56.56	18	Did not advance				
Campbell Melville Ives	Men's halfpipe	84.75	DNI	—N/a	84.75	8 **Q**	43.00	DNI	DNI	43.00	12
Dane Menzies	Men's big air	77.75	86.25	DNI	164.00	11 **Q**	81.25	79.50	DNI	160.75	6
Dane Menzies	Men's slopestyle	86.06	23.33	—N/a	86.06	1 **Q**	76.10	21.03	34.61	76.10	7
**Zoi Sadowski-Synnott**	Women's big air	90.00	82.25	82.25	172.25	1 **Q**	27.75	88.75	83.50	172.25	2nd place, silver medalist(s)
**Zoi Sadowski-Synnott**	Women's slopestyle	81.73	88.08	—N/a	88.08	1 **Q**	73.01	77.61	87.48	87.48	2nd place, silver medalist(s)

== See also ==
- New Zealand at the 2026 Winter Paralympics
