= Stuart Blakely =

New Zealand alpine skier (born 1956)

Stuart Blakely (born August 15, 1956) is an alpine skier from New Zealand.

He competed for New Zealand at two Olympics. In the 1976 Winter Olympics at Innsbruck, and was 53rd in the downhill and 35th in the slalom, but did not finish in the giant slalom.

In the 1980 Winter Olympics at Lake Placid, he came 32nd in the downhill, but did not finish in the slalom or giant slalom. He was the flag bearer for New Zealand in 1976 and 1980.

He is a brother of 1968 alpine skier Margot Blakely.

Stuart currently lives in Christchurch.
