= Thomas Huppert =

New Zealand alpine skier (born 1942)

Thomas (Tomas or Tom) Huppert (born 1942) is an alpine skier from New Zealand.

He competed for New Zealand at the 1968 Winter Olympics at Grenoble, and came 61st in the Downhill and 75th in the Giant Slalom. He was the flagbearer for New Zealand at the Games ceremony.
