= Mark Edmond =

New Zealand bobsledder

Personal information
- Born: Mark Fraser Edmond; 22 January 1977 (age 49) Christchurch, New Zealand
- Height: 1.91 m (6 ft 3 in)
- Weight: 99 kg (218 lb)

Sport
- Country: New Zealand
- Sport: Bobsleigh

Mark Fraser Edmond (born 22 January 1977) is a New Zealand former bobsledder. He competed in the two man and the four man events at the 2002 Winter Olympics.
