= Markus Hubrich =

New Zealand alpine skier (born 1963)

Marcus Hubrich (born 5 February 1963) is an alpine skier from New Zealand.

== Career ==
He competed for New Zealand at the 1984 Winter Olympics at Sarajevo; and came 35th in the Downhill, 14th in the Slalom, and 29th in the Giant Slalom. He was the New Zealand flagbearer at the games.

== Personal life ==
He is a brother of 1984 and 1988 alpine skier Mattias Hubrich.
