= Zeacom =

New Zealand software company

- Type: Privately held company
- Industry: Telecommunications software
- Founded: 1994
- Founders: Miles Valentine
- Headquarters: Auckland, New Zealand
- Area served: Worldwide
- Products: Zeacom Communications Center
- Parent: Enghouse Interactive
- Website: Zeacom

Zeacom was a software company based in Auckland, New Zealand, with offices in the USA (Orange County, CA), the United Kingdom and Australia. The company sold Call Center and Unified Communications software applications to customers worldwide through large vendors and accredited resellers. An in-house team provided Business Process Automation and consulting services.

Zeacom Communications Center was the company's flagship product, and was in use at over 3,500 sites worldwide. It integrated with NEC, Cisco and Avaya PBX platforms, and interoperated with Microsoft Lync.

In 2012, the company was acquired by Phoenix, AZ-based communications company Enghouse Interactive, and the Zeacom Communications Center was rebranded as Enghouse Interactive Communications Centre (EICC).

== Key Products ==
- ZCC Agent Desktop - allows contact center managers to view real-time information on queue and agent performance from their PCs.
- ZCC Multimedia Queuing - lets customer service agents view all queues on their screen, without switching applications to manage emails, web chat or SMS messages.
- ZCC Operator Console - provides operators with additional call handling abilities.
- ZCC Executive Desktop - enables individuals to efficiently handle calls direct to their extension, by-passing the company operator.
- ZCC Executive Insight - allows Microsoft Outlook users to manage all their communications from within their email application.
- ZCC Executive Mobile - brings Unified Communications functionality to the mobile phone.
- ZCC Business Process Automation - automating repetitive and predictable business processes.

== Awards and Grants ==
Zeacom has received the 2010 and 2009 IP Contact Center Technology Pioneer Award from Customer Interaction Solutions magazine, and the 2006 Supreme Award at the American Chamber of Commerce-UPS Business Awards, Auckland, New Zealand. In 2010 Zeacom was one of the first recipients of the New Zealand Government’s Technology Development Grant.
