= New Zealand at the 2006 Winter Olympics =

- IOC code: NZL
- NOC: New Zealand Olympic Committee
- Website: www.olympic.org.nz

in Turin
- Competitors: 18 in 5 sports
- Flag bearers: Sean Becker (opening and closing)
- Medals: Gold 0 Silver 0 Bronze 0 Total 0

Winter Olympics appearances (overview)
- 1952; 1956; 1960; 1964; 1968; 1972; 1976; 1980; 1984; 1988; 1992; 1994; 1998; 2002; 2006; 2010; 2014; 2018; 2022; 2026

New Zealand competed at the 2006 Winter Olympics in Turin, Italy.

The team consisted of 18 athletes (13 men and 5 women), 7 more than in Salt Lake City in 2002, and was the largest team ever sent by New Zealand until 2018, when it also won its second ever Winter Olympics medal, following a silver medal in Albertville.

== Alpine skiing ==
New Zealand's top finisher in alpine skiing, Mickey Ross, survived a fall in the first run of the men's slalom to record a 31st-place finish.

Athlete	Event	Final				
Athlete	Event	Run 1	Run 2	Run 3	Total	Rank
Nicola Campbell	Women's giant slalom	did not finish				
Nicola Campbell	Women's slalom	45.90	50.92	n/a	1:36.82	35
Erika McLeod	Women's giant slalom	did not finish				
Erika McLeod	Women's slalom	47.96	52.61	n/a	1:40.57	40
Mickey Ross	Men's slalom	1:03.30	54.50	n/a	1:57.80	31

== Bobsleigh ==
The New Zealand team did not compete in the four-man bobsleigh due to injuries from a training run. Mathew Dallow and Alan Henderson did compete in the two-man event, but did not qualify for the final run.

Athlete	Event	Final					
Athlete	Event	Run 1	Run 2	Run 3	Run 4	Total	Rank
Mathew Dallow; Alan Henderson	Two-man	56.61	56.79	57.46	did not advance		23
Mathew Dallow; Steve Harrison; Alan Henderson; Aaron Orangi	Four-man	did not start					

== Curling ==
The New Zealand national men's team qualified for the games after placing 8th at the 2005 World Championships. The team heading to Turin was skipped by Sean Becker, out of Ranfurly CC. The New Zealand men's team is the first team from the southern hemisphere to compete in curling as an official sport at the Olympics. Australia had previously competed in curling at the Olympics, but that was as a demonstration sport.

Sean Becker's rink twice lost games late, including giving up two in the final end to fall to the eventual silver medalists from Finland. However, these were the only bright spots for the New Zealand side, which finished the round robin in last place, without a victory.

=== Men's ===
Team: Sean Becker (skip), Hans Frauenlob, Dan Mustapic, Lorne Depape, Warren Dobson (alternate)

Round Robin
Draw 1

Team	1	2	3	4	5	6	7	8	9	10	Final
New Zealand (Becker)	0	0	0	1	0	1	0	1	0	0	3
Sweden (Lindholm)	0	0	1	0	3	0	1	0	1	0	6

;Draw 2

Team	1	2	3	4	5	6	7	8	9	10	Final
Great Britain (Murdoch)	0	1	4	0	0	0	3	0	2	X	9
New Zealand (Becker)	1	0	0	0	2	1	0	1	0	X	5

;Draw 3

Team	1	2	3	4	5	6	7	8	9	10	Final
United States (Fenson)	0	2	2	0	2	1	0	3	X	X	10
New Zealand (Becker)	2	0	0	0	0	0	2	0	X	X	4

;Draw 4

Team	1	2	3	4	5	6	7	8	9	10	Final
Finland (Uusipaavalniemi)	0	0	2	0	0	0	2	0	0	2	6
New Zealand (Becker)	0	2	0	0	1	1	0	1	0	0	5

;Draw 6

Team	1	2	3	4	5	6	7	8	9	10	Final
Switzerland (Stöckli)	2	0	0	0	2	0	1	3	0	1	9
New Zealand (Becker)	0	2	0	1	0	2	0	0	2	0	7

;Draw 8

Team	1	2	3	4	5	6	7	8	9	10	11	Final
New Zealand (Becker)	0	1	0	1	0	0	1	0	1	1	0	5
Italy (Retornaz)	0	0	2	0	2	0	0	1	0	0	1	6

;Draw 10

Team	1	2	3	4	5	6	7	8	9	10	Final
Norway (Trulsen)	0	2	0	0	3	0	1	0	2	1	9
New Zealand (Becker)	1	0	1	0	0	2	0	2	0	0	6

;Draw 11

Team	1	2	3	4	5	6	7	8	9	10	Final
New Zealand (Becker)	0	0	0	0	1	0	0	X	X	X	1
Canada (Gushue)	1	1	0	1	0	3	3	X	X	X	9

;Draw 12

Team	1	2	3	4	5	6	7	8	9	10	Final
New Zealand (Becker)	0	1	0	0	0	0	X	X	X	X	1
Germany (Kapp)	2	0	3	2	2	1	X	X	X	X	10

Standings

Rank	Team	Skip	Won	Lost
1	Finland	Markku Uusipaavalniemi	7	2
2	Canada	Brad Gushue	6	3
3	United States	Pete Fenson	6	3
4	Great Britain	David Murdoch	6	3
5	Norway	Pål Trulsen	5	4
6	Switzerland	Ralph Stockli	5	4
7	Italy	Joel Retornaz	4	5
8	Sweden	Peter Lindholm	3	6
9	Germany	Andy Kapp	3	6
10	New Zealand	Sean Becker	0	9

== Skeleton ==
Skeleton provided New Zealand with its two best finishes in Turin, including its only top-10, from Ben Sandford. Sandford had the fifth fastest second run, but his slower first run left him in 10th place.

Athlete	Event	Final			
Athlete	Event	Run 1	Run 2	Total	Rank
Louise Corcoran	Women's	1:01.06	1:02.03	2:03.09	12
Ben Sandford	Men's	59.16	58.60	1:57.76	10

== Snowboarding ==
All three New Zealand snowboarders in Turin competed in the halfpipe, with Juliane Bray being the closest to qualifying for the final, finishing 16th overall. Bray also entered the snowboard cross, but was unable to qualify for the knockout rounds.

Halfpipe

Athlete	Event	Qualifying Run 1		Qualifying Run 2		Final		
Athlete	Event	Points	Rank	Points	Rank	Run 1	Run 2	Rank
Juliane Bray	Women's halfpipe	17.1	23	32.2	10	did not advance		16
Kendall Brown	Women's halfpipe	22.9	18	22.4	18	did not advance		24
Mitchell Brown	Men's halfpipe	16.3	33	28.3	19	did not advance		25

Note: In the final, the single best score from two runs is used to determine the ranking. A bracketed score indicates a run that wasn't counted.

Snowboard Cross

Athlete	Event	Qualifying		1/8 Finals	Quarterfinals	Semifinals	Finals	
Athlete	Event	Time	Rank	Position	Position	Position	Position	Rank
Juliane Bray	Women's snowboard cross	1:34.45	20	did not advance				20

== Flag bearer ==
Sean Becker, the captain of New Zealand's curling team, carried the flag for the New Zealand team in both the opening and closing ceremonies. There was some controversy about the later of these, as the position of closing ceremony flag bearer is usually reserved for the best-performed competitor from the country and the curling team had finished last in their competition.

Traditionally the New Zealand team flag bearer at an Olympic games wears a blessed Māori cloak called the Kotahu.

== See also ==
- New Zealand Olympic Committee
- New Zealand Olympic medallists
- Sport in New Zealand
