= Angie Paul =

New Zealand luger

Angela Paul, later Angela Edmond (born 27 March 1975), is a luger from New Zealand who has competed for New Zealand at two Olympics. In the 1998 Winter Olympics at Nagano, she came 19th in the Women's Singles; in the 2002 Winter Olympics at Salt Lake City, she came 23rd in the Women's Singles. She was the flag bearer for New Zealand in 2002.
