= New Zealand at the 1968 Winter Olympics =

- IOC code: NZL (NZE used at these Games)
- NOC: New Zealand Olympic Committee
- Website: www.olympic.org.nz

in Grenoble
- Competitors: 6 (4 men, 2 women) in 1 sport
- Flag bearer: Thomas Huppert
- Medals: Gold 0 Silver 0 Bronze 0 Total 0

Winter Olympics appearances (overview)
- 1952; 1956; 1960; 1964; 1968; 1972; 1976; 1980; 1984; 1988; 1992; 1994; 1998; 2002; 2006; 2010; 2014; 2018; 2022; 2026

New Zealand had seven competitors (five men and two women) at the 1968 Winter Olympics in Grenoble, France. All took part in the Alpine Skiing events; the highest finish by a New Zealand competitor was 30th place by Anne Reid in the Ladies Slalom.

== Alpine skiing ==
Men

Athlete	Event	Race 1		Race 2		Total	
Athlete	Event	Time	Rank	Time	Rank	Time	Rank
Murray Gardner	Downhill					DSQ	–
Thomas Huppert	Downhill					2:18.29	61
Robert Palmer	Downhill					2:09.79	42
Robert Palmer	Giant Slalom	DNF	–	–	–	DNF	–
Murray Gardner	Giant Slalom	2:13.37	80	2:07.90	73	4:21.27	76
Michael Dennis	Giant Slalom	2:08.69	79	2:09.43	75	4:18.12	74
Thomas Huppert	Giant Slalom	2:07.60	77	2:13.20	78	4:20.80	75

Men's slalom

Athlete	Heat 1		Heat 2		Final					
Athlete	Time	Rank	Time	Rank	Time 1	Rank	Time 2	Rank	Total	Rank
Thomas Huppert	1:04.77	4	DSQ	–	did not advance					
Michael Dennis	1:12.75	5	1:06.78	4	did not advance					
Murray Gardner	DSQ	–	1:02.08	3	did not advance					
Robert Palmer	DSQ	–	56.24	3	did not advance					

Women

Athlete	Event	Race 1		Race 2		Total	
Athlete	Event	Time	Rank	Time	Rank	Time	Rank
Anne Reid	Downhill					1:53.12	37
Anne Reid	Giant Slalom					2:13.30	42
Margot Blakely	Slalom	DSQ	–	–	–	DSQ	–
Anne Reid	Slalom	52.97	32	57.61	29	1:50.58	30
