= Simon Wi Rutene =

New Zealand alpine skier and politician

Simon Lyle Wi Rutene (born 10 March 1966) is an alpine skier from New Zealand. He has competed for New Zealand at four Olympics. He decided to be a ski racer at 12, and went to a U.S. ski resort on his own. At 16 he was sponsored, and did his first downhill run at Wengen, Switzerland.

In the 1984 Winter Olympics at Sarajevo, he came 36th in the Giant Slalom.

In the 1988 Winter Olympics at Calgary, he came 17th in the Slalom. He was the New Zealand flagbearer at the opening ceremony.

In the 1992 Winter Olympics at Albertville, he came 42nd in the Super G and 28th in the Giant Slalom.

In the 1994 Winter Olympics at Lillehammer, he came 20th in skiing combined, 23rd in the Downhill Combined and 18th in the Slalom Combined.

Wi Rutene retired from competitive skiing in 1998.

Wi Rutene holds a Bachelor of Laws and a Bachelor of Commerce from Victoria University of Wellington.

== Politics ==
In the 2005 general election he was a list candidate for the Māori Party. He was ranked fourth on the party list. The party gained four MPs at that election, but all from electorate seats and Wi Rutene was not elected.
