= Awakino ski area =

Ski resort in New Zealand

Awakino Ski Area
- Interactive map of Awakino Ski Area
- Location: Canterbury
- Nearest major city: Kurow
- Coordinates: 44.7784°S 170.3301°E
- Top elevation: 1942 m
- Base elevation: 1450 m
- Trails: Backcountry
- Lift system: 2 Rope tow
- Terrain parks: 0
- Snowmaking: no
- Website: https://skiawakino.com

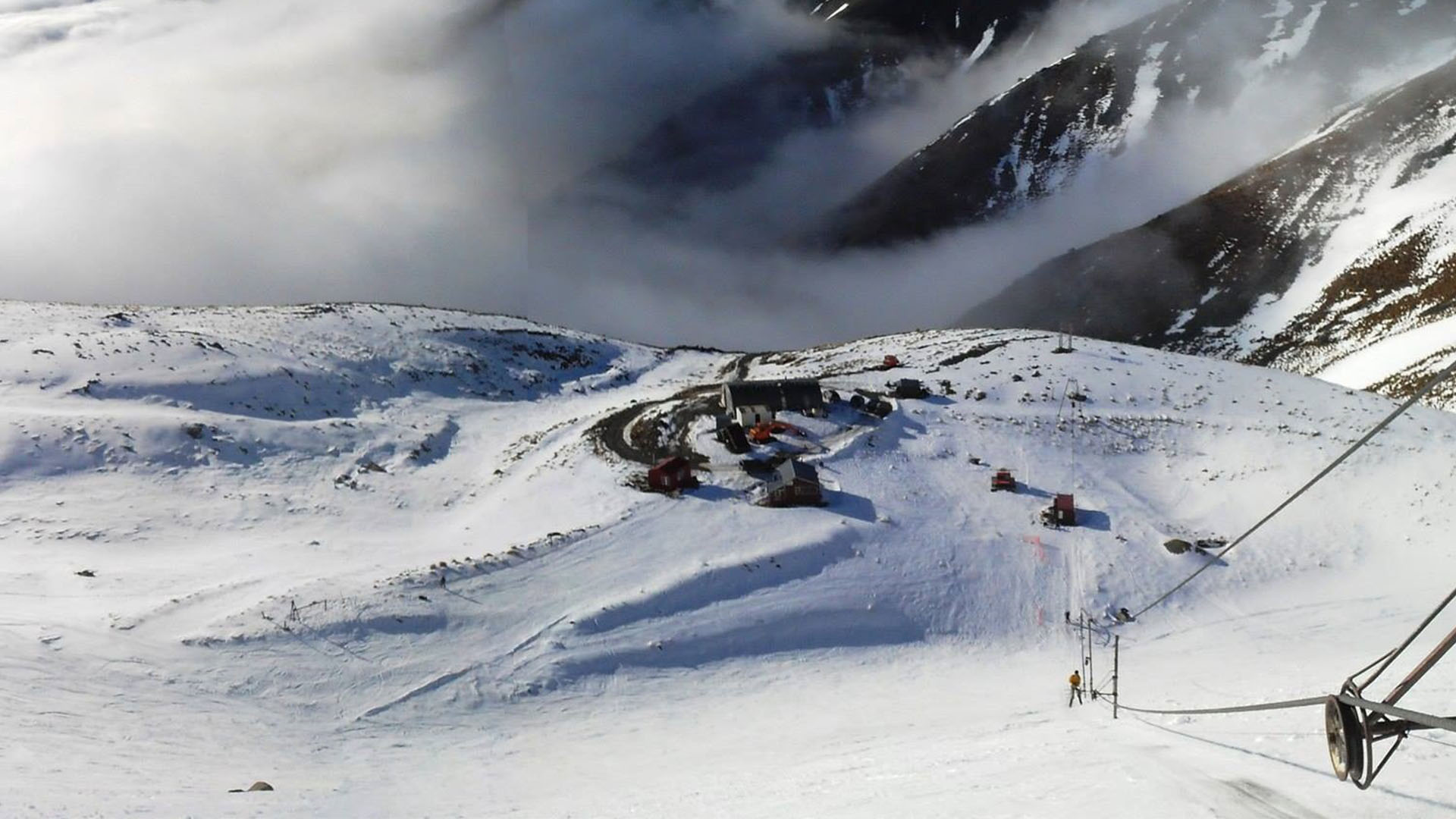
View from the Waitaki Face of Awakino Ski Area, looking back towards the day hut and access road.

The Awakino ski field is located in St. Marys Range, in the Canterbury, New Zealand part of Waitaki District near Kurow. It is run by the Waitaki Ski Club. The field is little changed from when it was established in the late 1940s. Run by volunteers only, it operates most weekends in the winter season, which normally lasts from July to October. The field has one and a half high-speed rope tows, queues are unheard of and a busy day means more than 10 people.

The field is normally open most weekends from July to October. Long weekends may operate when the snow conditions are good and club members are available.

The Waitaki Ski Club welcomes 'membership' from those with a long-term commitment to the field. In exchange for your skills and contributing to the long-term development of the field, you get free skiing. There are normally several working weekends in the off season and 'members' run and contribute to these. Every able-bodied member is expected to contribute to work parties.

== Lodge ==
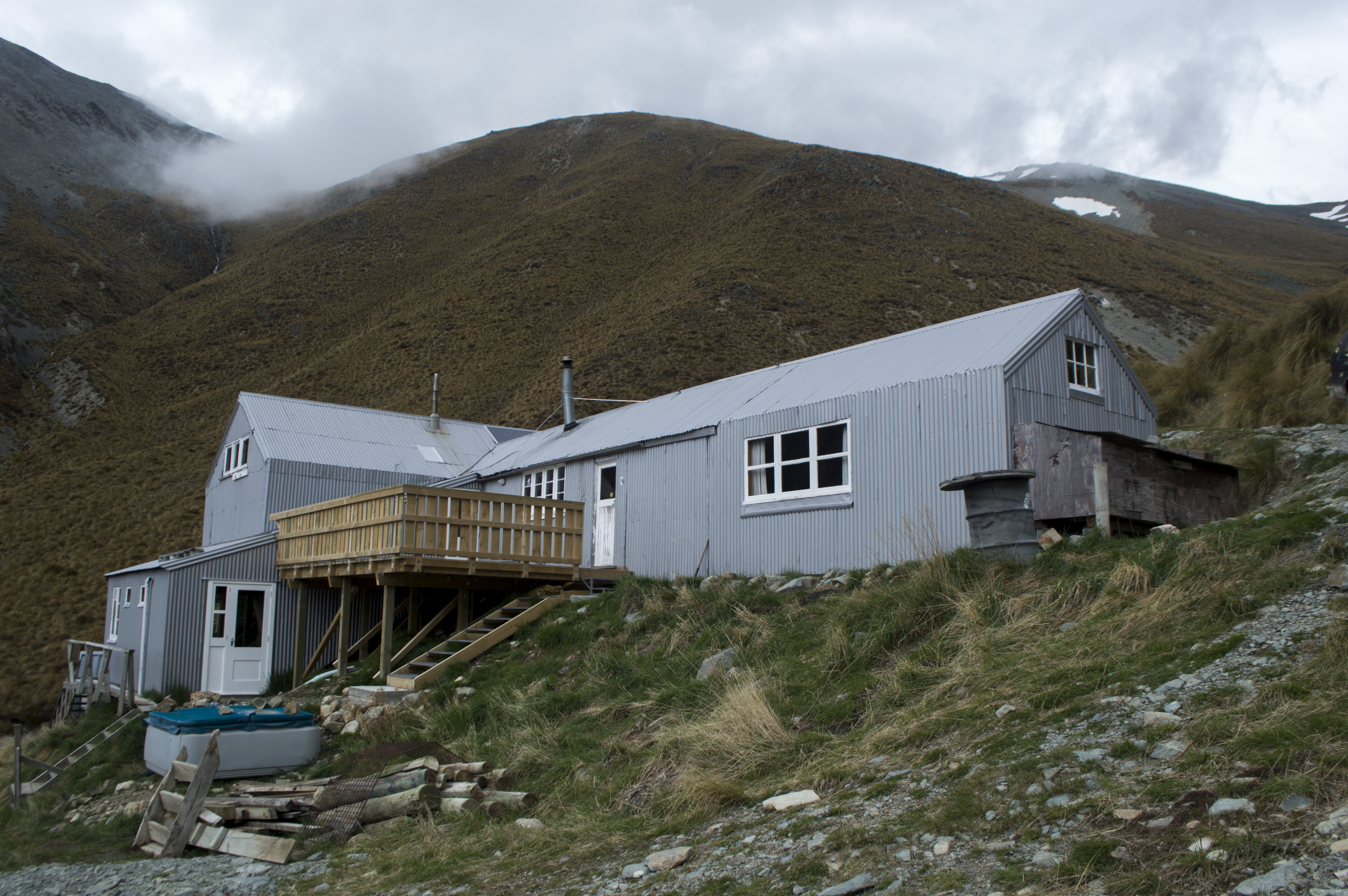
Awakino Lodge

The field has a 27 bunk accommodation lodge, situated at 1100 metres on the access road, 300 metres below the field base buildings. This is normally at the limit of the winter snowline, and is accessible on skis from the main field down two side gulleys (Arthurs run and the old access tow gulley). 4WD access is normally available to the lodge, otherwise it is a 30-minute walk to it from the top car park in the valley below. No cellphone coverage is available at the lodge.

The lodge has two bunk-rooms, and is heated by a combination of coal/wood burners and generated electricity. Fitted with flush toilets, hot showers, full kitchen facilities, dining room/hall, outside deck and outdoor heated spa. The lodge is original, dating back to the earliest days of skiing in New Zealand. It is also used for other activities, such as mountain instruction courses, tramping groups and mountain biking in the summer.
