= Patricia Prain =

New Zealand alpine skier (born 1933)

Patricia Hope "Tish" Prain (later Tish Pike, born 2 September 1939) is a New Zealand alpine skier.

Prain competed for New Zealand at the 1960 Winter Olympics at Oslo, and came 36th in the Downhill, 32nd in the Slalom and 34th in the Giant Slalom.
