= Alan Henderson (bobsledder) =

New Zealand bobsledder (born 1965)

Personal information
- Full name: Alan Charles Henderson
- Born: 28 May 1965 (age 61) King's Lynn, United Kingdom

Sport
- Country: New Zealand
- Sport: Bobsleigh

Alan Charles Henderson (born 28 May 1965) is an English-born New Zealand bobsledder who competed from 1990 to 2006.

Competing in three Winter Olympics, 1998, 2002 and 2006; he earned his best finish of 23rd in the two-man event at Turin in 2006.

At the FIBT World Championships, Henderson earned his best finish of 22nd in the two-man event at Calgary in 2005.

Henderson was injured during a practice run for the four-man event at the 2006 Winter Olympics and did not compete. He retired following those games.
