= Mattias Hubrich =

New Zealand alpine skier (born 1966)

Mattias Hubrich (born 26 May 1966) is an alpine skier from New Zealand.

He competed for New Zealand at the 1984 Winter Olympics at Sarajevo; and came 17th in the Slalom.

He competed for New Zealand at the 1988 Winter Olympics at Calgary; and came 22nd in the Slalom and 24th in the Super G but did not finish in the Giant Slalom.

He is a brother of 1984 alpine skier Markus Hubrich.
