= Liz Couch =

New Zealand skeleton racer

Liz Couch (born 11 October 1974) is a New Zealand skeleton racer who competed from 1999 to 2002. She finished 11th in the women's skeleton event at the 2002 Winter Olympics in Salt Lake City.

Couch's best finish at the FIBT World Championships was 15th in the women's skeleton event at Igls in 2000.
