= Bill Hunt (alpine skier) =

New Zealand alpine skier (1929–2009)

William Francis Irwin (Wiff or Bill) Hunt (28 September 1929 – 29 November 2009) was an alpine skier from New Zealand.

He competed for New Zealand at the 1952 Winter Olympics at Oslo, the first Winter Olympics for New Zealand. He was 65th in the Downhill, 75th in the Slalom and 81st in the Giant Slalom. There was no New Zealand Olympic team in 1956. He again represented New Zealand in the 1960 Winter Olympics at Squaw Valley, when he was the flagbearer. He was 54th in the Downhill and 51st in the Giant Slalom.

He was educated at Te Kuiti School, Southwell School in Hamilton, King's College in Auckland, and Massey Agricultural College in Palmerston North. Later, he was a farmer. He had been introduced to skiing at Mount Ruapehu while at Massey in 1948, when he joined the Ruapehu Ski Club, and had instruction at Ruapehu from Swiss champion Walter Haensli. He was on the club committee; later as president, life member and patron. He was a councillor and president (chairman) of the New Zealand Ski Association. He was New Zealand ski champion six times between 1954 and 1962, and later competed in Masters Ski Racing at international level. He was born and died in Te Kūiti; his wife Rosemary was also from Te Kūiti.
