= Juliane Bray =

New Zealand snowboarder (born 1975)

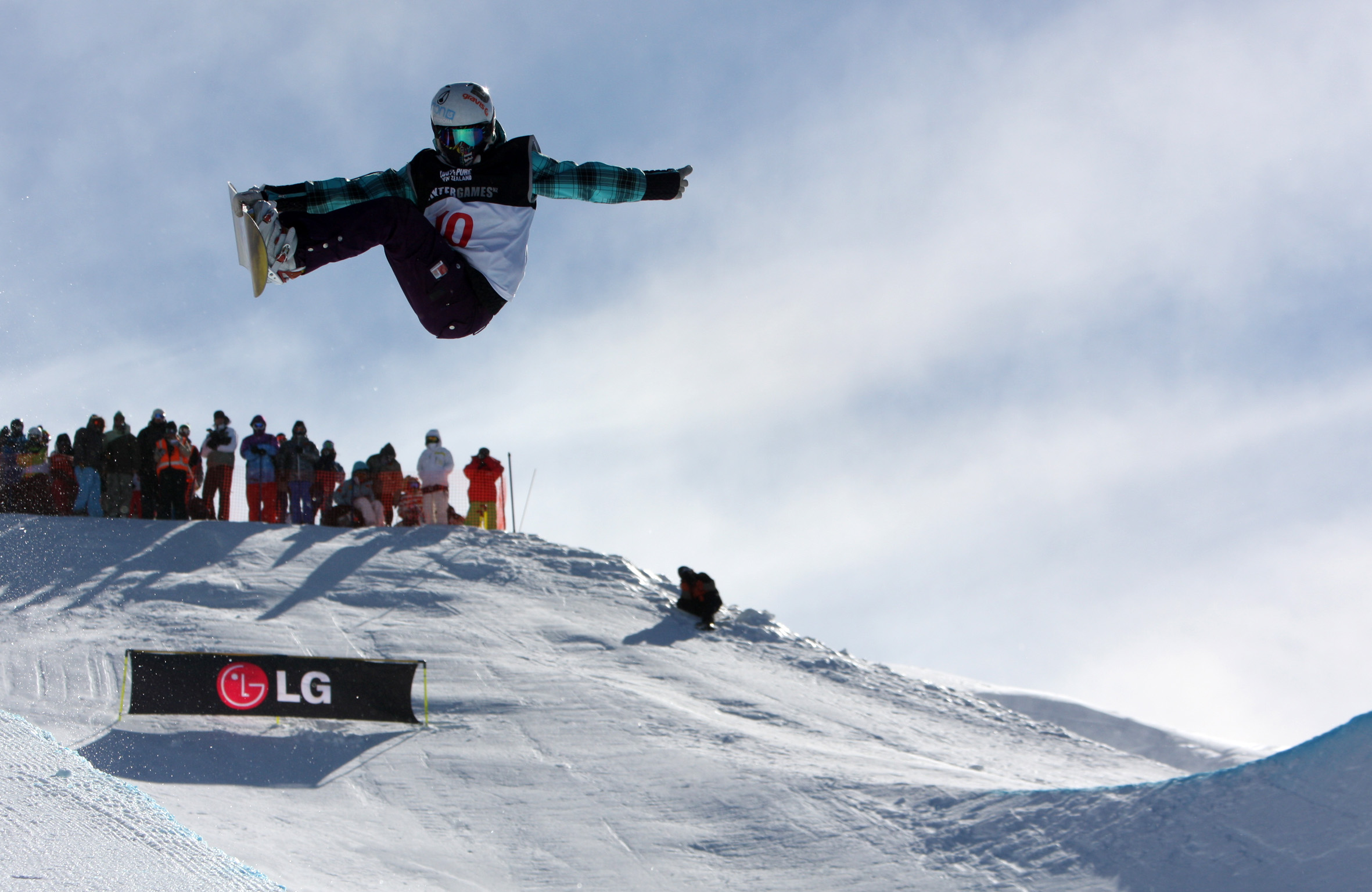

Juliane Bray (born 9 October 1975) is a New Zealand snowboarder. She first gained notice in 2001 when she won a World Cup boarder-cross race in Japan. She represented New Zealand at the 2006 Winter Olympics by competing in snowcross and halfpipe. She represented New Zealand at the 2010 Winter Olympics and was selected as her nation's flag bearer at the opening ceremony.
