= Tony Smith (speed skater) =

New Zealand short track speed skater

Tony Lee Smith
Personal information
- Born: 25 December 1961 (age 64) Christchurch, New Zealand

Sport
- Country: New Zealand
- Sport: Speed skating
- Turned pro: 1982
- Retired: 1996

Tony Lee Smith (born 25 December 1961 in Christchurch) is a short track speed skater from New Zealand.

He competed in Short Track Speed Skating at a national level from 1982 until he retired from competitive skating in 1996 aged 34-year-old. During this time he broke or held numerous open or national records in individual or relay skating events. He is still the current New Zealand Record holder for the 160m Straight Sprint, a race that was held each year in conjunction with the National Long Track Speed Skating Championships.

He competed for New Zealand in two Olympic Winter games. At the 1992 Winter Olympics in Albertville, France; the team he was in came 4th in the 5000 m short-track relay missing the bronze medal by just 0.7 sec.

At the 1994 Winter Olympics in Lillehammer, Norway; the team he was in was placed 8th in the 5000 m short-track relay, after being disqualified in the B final. At the Lillehammer games he carried the New Zealand flag at the opening ceremony.

He was a New Zealand Representative in Short Track Speed Skating at three World Championship events. 1991 World Championships in Sydney where the team he was in came 2nd. 1991 World Teams Championships in Korea (6th) and the 1993 World Championships in China where the team he was placed 1st in the 5000 m relay in a world-record time.

He also represented Canterbury in Track Cycling at the 1984 and 1985 New Zealand National Championships competing in both the Sprint and 1 Kilometer Time Trial.
