= New Zealand at the 1952 Winter Olympics =

- IOC code: NZL
- NOC: New Zealand Olympic Committee
- Website: www.olympic.org.nz

in Oslo
- Competitors: 3 (2 men, 1 woman) in 1 sport
- Flag bearer: Austin Haywood
- Medals: Gold 0 Silver 0 Bronze 0 Total 0

Winter Olympics appearances (overview)
- 1952; 1956; 1960; 1964; 1968; 1972; 1976; 1980; 1984; 1988; 1992; 1994; 1998; 2002; 2006; 2010; 2014; 2018; 2022; 2026; 2030

New Zealand competed at the 1952 Winter Olympics in Oslo, Norway. It was the first time that the nation had competed at the Winter Olympic Games. The country was represented by its skiing team, captained by Sir Roy McKenzie, who was injured and did not compete.

Team members were skiers Annette Johnson who came 30th in the Giant Slalom (3-0.66), the best result of the team; Herbert (Herbie) Familton (finished 65th in downhill, 77th in Giant Slalom); Bill Hunt (finished 81st in Giant Slalom); instructor Herbert Modelhart; and Austin Haywood the team Assistant Manager who was the flagbearer at the opening ceremony. No medals were earned.

== Alpine skiing ==
Men

Athlete	Event	Race 1		Race 2		Total	
Athlete	Event	Time	Rank	Time	Rank	Time	Rank
Herbert Familton	Downhill					3:44.6	65
Bill Hunt	Giant Slalom					3:51.6	81
Herbert Familton	Giant Slalom					3:31.7	77
Bill Hunt	Slalom	1:29.5	75	did not advance			

Women

Athlete	Event	Race 1		Race 2		Total	
Athlete	Event	Time	Rank	Time	Rank	Time	Rank
Annette Johnson	Giant Slalom					2:57.7	39
Annette Johnson	Slalom	DSQ	–	–	–	DSQ	–
