= Annelise Coberger =

New Zealand alpine skier (born 1971)

Medal record

Women's alpine skiing

Representing New Zealand

Olympic Games
Silver medal – second place	1992 Albertville	Slalom

Annelise Coberger (born 16 September 1971) is a New Zealand former alpine skier. Born in Christchurch, she became the first person from the Southern Hemisphere to win a medal at the Winter Olympics when she won silver in the slalom at Albertville in France in 1992. For this success, at the annual Halberg Awards she was awarded the title of New Zealand Sportsman of the Year. Coberger also competed at the 1994 Winter Olympics in Lillehammer but did not finish her first run of the slalom. Coberger remained the only Winter Olympic medalist from New Zealand for 26 years until Zoi Sadowski-Synnott won bronze in the women's big air at the 2018 Winter Olympics in Pyeongchang.

Coberger won one World Cup slalom and reached seven other World Cup podiums. In the 1992–93 season, she was the runner-up in the Slalom World Cup with just 6 points behind the winner Vreni Schneider. Coberger finished competing at an international level a couple of years after her Olympic success (her last World Cup race was in March 1995). She then joined the New Zealand Police. She has two children, born in 2002 and 2004.

== World Cup victories ==
Date	Location	Race
14 January 1992	(Austria) Hinterstoder	Slalom

Awards
Preceded by Philippa Baker	New Zealand's Sportswoman of the Year; 1992	Succeeded by Susan Devoy
Preceded by Philippa Baker	Halberg Awards – Supreme Award; 1992	Succeeded by Eisenhower Trophy Team
