= New Zealand at the 1980 Winter Olympics =

- IOC code: NZL
- NOC: New Zealand Olympic Committee
- Website: www.olympic.org.nz

in Lake Placid
- Competitors: 5 (3 men, 2 women) in 1 sport
- Flag bearer: Stuart Blakely
- Medals: Gold 0 Silver 0 Bronze 0 Total 0

Winter Olympics appearances (overview)
- 1952; 1956; 1960; 1964; 1968; 1972; 1976; 1980; 1984; 1988; 1992; 1994; 1998; 2002; 2006; 2010; 2014; 2018; 2022; 2026; 2030

New Zealand competed at the 1980 Winter Olympics in Lake Placid, United States.

== Alpine skiing ==
Men

Athlete	Event	Race 1		Race 2		Total	
Athlete	Event	Time	Rank	Time	Rank	Time	Rank
Stuart Blakely	Downhill					1:55.41	32
Scott Kendall	Giant Slalom	DNF	–	–	–	DNF	–
Mark Vryenhoek	Giant Slalom	DNF	–	–	–	DNF	–
Stuart Blakely	Giant Slalom	1:32.99	54	DNF	–	DNF	–
Mark Vryenhoek	Slalom	DNF	–	–	–	DNF	–
Stuart Blakely	Slalom	DNF	–	–	–	DNF	–
Scott Kendall	Slalom	1:02.27	31	58.72	27	2:00.99	26

Women

Athlete	Event	Race 1		Race 2		Total	
Athlete	Event	Time	Rank	Time	Rank	Time	Rank
Anna Archibald	Downhill					1:46.68	26
Anna Archibald	Giant Slalom	1:25.82	38	1:40.32	32	3:06.14	32
Fiona Johnson	Giant Slalom	1:24.62	36	1:36.04	29	3:00.66	30
Fiona Johnson	Slalom	n/a	?	DNF	–	DNF	–

== See also ==
- New Zealand at the 1980 Winter Paralympics
