= Lex Peterson =

New Zealand bobsledder

Personal information
- Full name: Alexander John Peterson
- Born: 14 September 1957; Palmerston North, New Zealand
- Died: 31 August 2004 (aged 46); Vancouver, British Columbia, Canada

Sport
- Country: New Zealand
- Sport: Bobsleigh

Alexander John Peterson (14 September 1957 – 31 August 2004) was a New Zealand bobsledder. He competed in the two man and the four man events at the 1988 Winter Olympics. Originally from Christchurch but living in Calgary, he was the driving force behind getting a bobsledding team together for the Olympics. After the competition, he took things easy: "I did nothing except eat, get fat and forget about bobsledding."
