= New Zealand Olympic Committee =

National Olympic Committee

- Country: New Zealand
- Code: NZL
- Created: 1911
- Recognized: 1919
- Continental Association: ONOC
- Headquarters: Auckland, New Zealand
- President: Liz Dawson
- Secretary General: Nicki Nicol
- Website: olympic.org.nz

The New Zealand Olympic Committee (before 1994, The New Zealand Olympic and Commonwealth Games Association) is both the National Olympic Committee and the Commonwealth Games Association in New Zealand responsible for selecting athletes to represent New Zealand in the Summer and Winter Olympic Games and the Commonwealth Games.

While a founder member of the International Olympic Committee, New Zealand did not send its own team to compete until the Games of the VI Olympiad (Antwerp 1920), though at the 1908 and 1912 Summer Olympics New Zealand and Australia competed as "Australasia". New Zealand has sent a team to every Summer Olympic Games since 1920, though only a token team of four went to the 1980 Summer Olympics at Moscow due to the boycott. New Zealand first competed at the Winter Olympics in 1952, but did not compete in the 1956 or 1964 Winter Olympics.

New Zealand has sent a team to every Commonwealth Games since the first in 1930, which was held in Canada and then called the British Empire Games. They are held every four years, in between the Olympic Games.

The New Zealand Olympics Committee is sponsored by a mix of commercial brands and government funding. Their premium partners are One New Zealand (One NZ), Kathmandu and ASB.

== Membership ==
The NZOC (New Zealand Olympic Committee) is a member of the International Olympic Committee and the Commonwealth Games Federation.

== Emblem ==
The NZOC emblem consisting of a depiction of a silver fern (New Zealand's sporting emblem) superimposed on the Olympic Rings was created as a marketing symbol in 1979 (which was initially in all-white on a black background). It was first publicly used at an Olympic Games at the Games of the XXII Olympiad (Moscow 1980, in which observers thought that the fern was an olive branch of peace)—New Zealand competed under this flag to protest the Soviet invasion of Afghanistan. It went to its current coloured version in 1994.

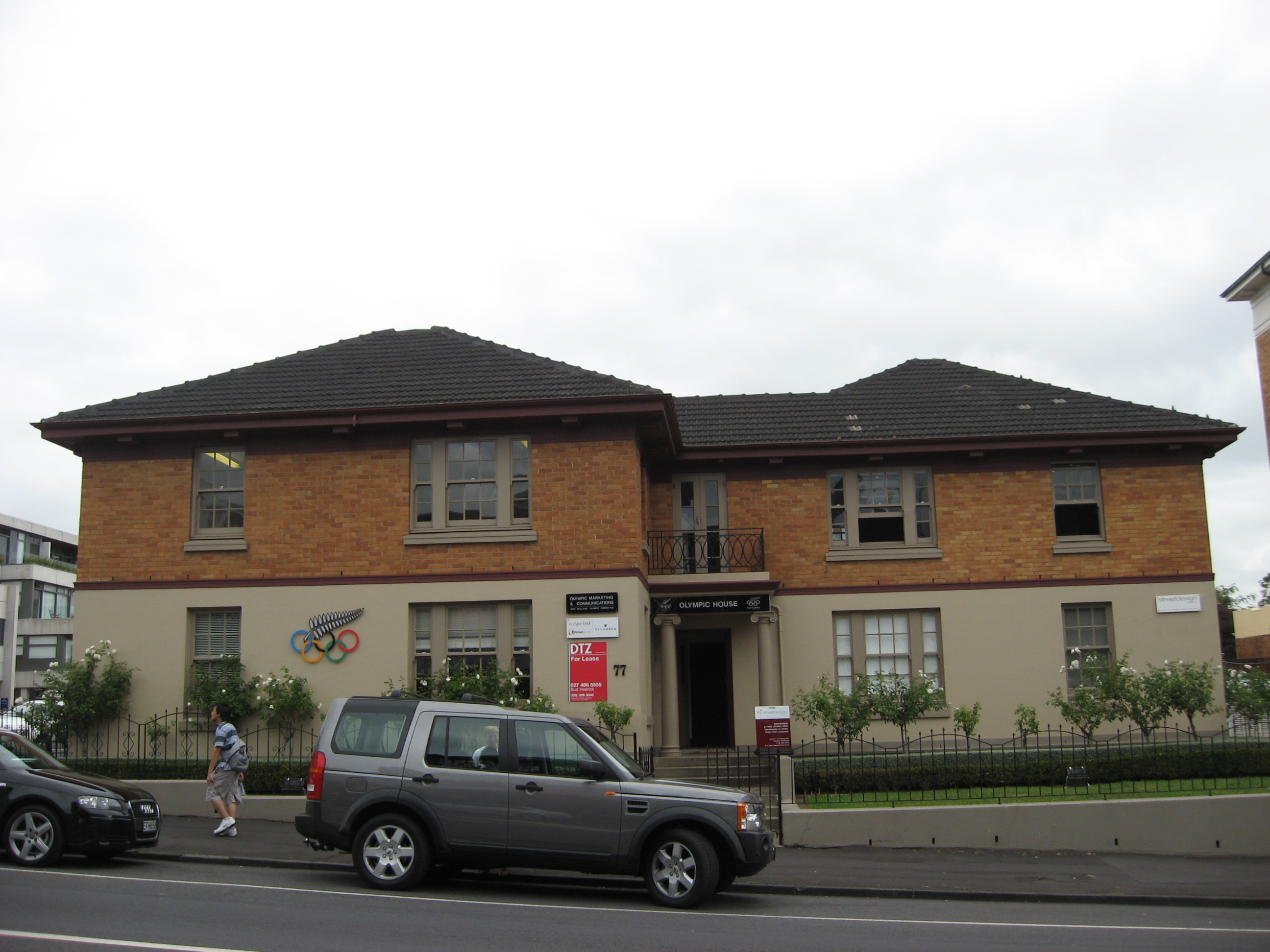
The headquarters of the New Zealand Olympic Committee in Parnell, Auckland.

== International Olympic Committee ==
The NZOC (New Zealand Olympic Committee) is the National Olympic Committee for New Zealand. The NZOC was founded in 1911 and recognised by the IOC in 1919. Former New Zealand members of the International Olympic Committee are:

- Leonard Cuff (1894–1905) 1st, one of the founding members (also Australia)
- Richard Coombes (1912–1919) 2nd (also Australia)
- Arthur A. Marryatt (1919–1923) 3rd
- Joseph Firth, CMG (1923–1927) 4th
- Lt-Gen Bernard Freyberg, VC, CMG, DSO (1928–1930) 5th
- Cecil J. Wray (1931–1934) 6th
- Sir Arthur Porritt, Bt GCMG CBE (1934–1967) 7th
- Sir Lance Cross, CBE (1969–1987) 8th
- Sir Tay Wilson, KNZM OBE (1988–2006) 9th
- Barbara Kendall, MBE (Oceania athletes' representative from 2005 to 2008) 10th
- Barry Maister CNZM (2010–2018) 11th
- Barbara Kendall CNZM MBE (2011–2016) 12th

Current International Olympic Committee (IOC) members are:

- Sarah Walker (Athletes' representative since 2016)

== Governance ==
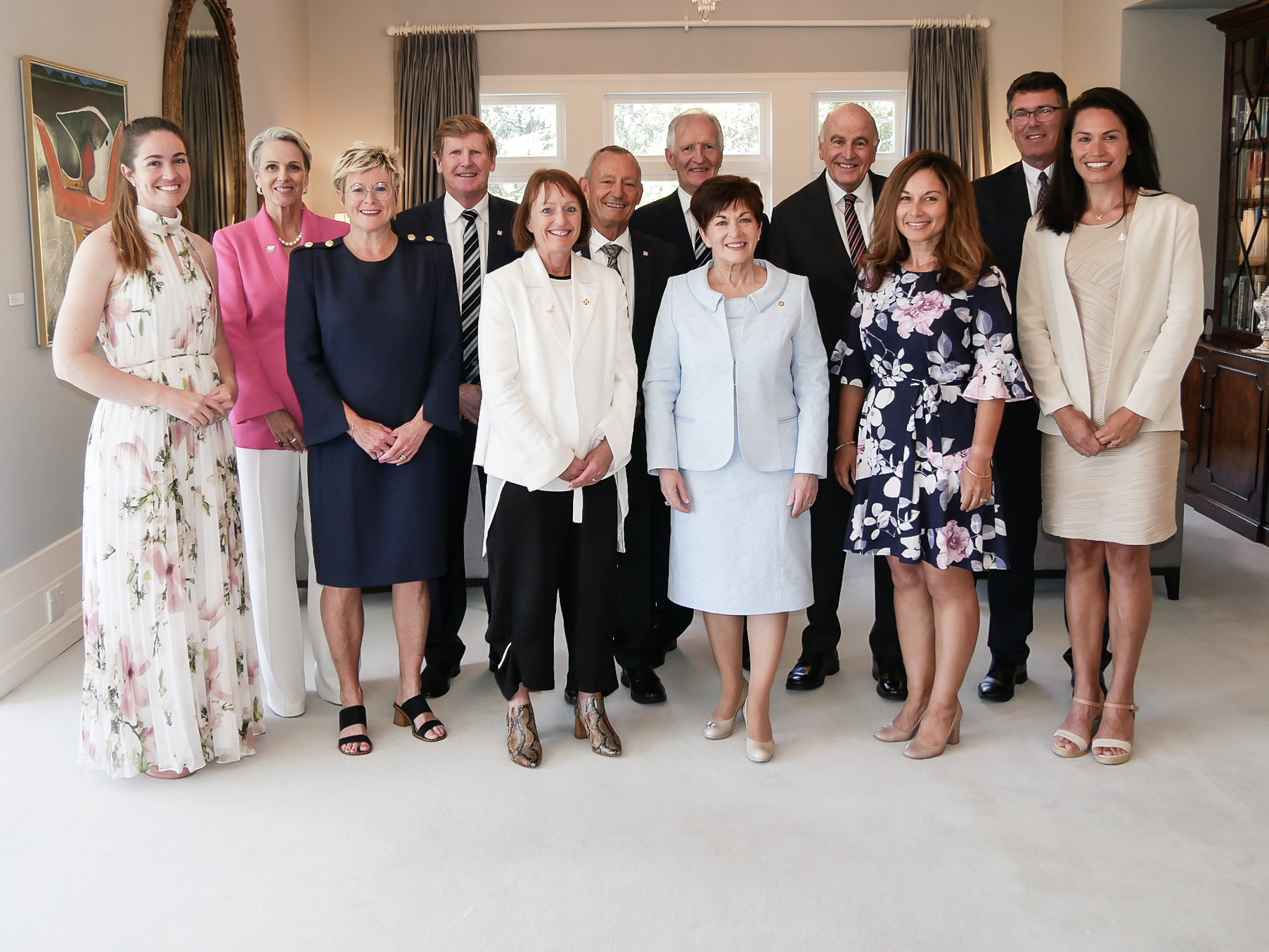
Dame Patsy Reddy and David Gascoigne with the NZOC board in 2020

The NZOC is governed by a board that is headed by a president. Five of the board members are elected by the general assembly. The two IOC members plus an athletes' representative complete the board. Since November 2022, the president is Liz Dawson.

Presidents

- Liz Dawson (2022–present)
- Mike Stanley CNZM (2009–2022)
- Sir Eion Edgar KNZM (acting 2001–2003; elected 2003–2009)
- John Davies MBE (active 2000–2001; formal but not acting 2001–2003)
- Hon. Sir David Beattie GCMG GCVO KBE QSO QC (1989–2000)

== See also ==
- Paralympics New Zealand
- New Zealand at the Olympics
- New Zealand at the Paralympics
- New Zealand at the Commonwealth Games
- New Zealand Olympic medallists
- Lonsdale Cup
