= Winter X Games XIV =

2010 multi-sport event in Aspen, Colorado, US

Winter X Games XIV (Winter X Games Fourteen)
- Location: (United States) Aspen, Colorado
- Dates: January 28–31

Winter X Games XIV were held from January 28 to January 31, 2010, in Aspen, Colorado. They were the 9th consecutive Winter X Games to be held in Aspen. The events were broadcast on ESPN.

== Sports ==
The following were the events at Winter X Games 14.

- Skiing
- Snowboarding
- Snowmobiling

== Highlights ==
Winter X Games XIV took place just two weeks before the start of the 2010 Winter Olympics in Vancouver. Many of the events such as the snowboard cross, ski cross, and half pipe events acted as a prelude and set the tone for the Vancouver Olympics.

Kaya Turski of Canada landed the highest score in slopestyle history at the X Games winning gold. In the same event, Sarah Burke tried to land a 1260 during her third and final run. Had she landed the 1260, this would have been the first time a woman had landed it during competition. Heath Frisby and Levi Lavallee, favourites in the snowmobile freestyle event, fail to qualify for the final, opening the door for Justin Hoyer, who went on to win the gold.

Sarah Burke failed in her attempt at a four-peat in the skier superpipe when she finished sixth, Jen Hudak won gold and 17-year-old phenom Megan Gunning won silver. Burke had predicted a year earlier that Gunning would be her biggest threat in an attempt to four-peat in the superpipe.

In the men's snowboard superpipe final, Shaun White won gold despite injuring himself 45 minutes prior to the final, in practice when he tried a 1080 inverted double cork. He did land two double corks back to back in the final and also added a double McTwist 1260 to seal off his gold medal run.

Nate Holland won his fifth consecutive gold medal in men's snowboard cross. This was the first five-peat in the history of the Winter X Games. Lindsey Jacobellis also became the first person to win a double three-peat, when she won the women's snowboard cross for the third year in a row. Her first three-peat was 2003–2005.

On the final day of competition, Ophélie David successfully completed the first four-peat in women's Winter X Games history, again winning the gold in skiercross. In the men's skiercross, the Canadians won a sweep of the medals, led by Chris Del Bosco. This was a first sweep of a Winter X Games medal round by a country other than the United States. With the men's sweep, along with Ashleigh McIvor and Kelsey Serwa's silver a bronze respectively, the Canadians won 5 out of 6 possible medals in ski cross.

== Schedule ==
All times listed are Mountain Standard Time (MST).

| | Wednesday, January 27, 2010 | |
| Time | Event | Location |
|---|---|---|
| 7:30pm – 8:30pm | Skiing SuperPipe Women's Elimination | Aspen, CO |

| | Thursday, January 28, 2010 | |
| Time | Event | Location |
|---|---|---|
| 10 am- 12 pm | Skiing Slopestyle Men's Elimination | Aspen, CO |
| 11:30 am- 1 pm | Snowmobile Freestyle Elimination | Aspen, CO |
| 1:00 pm– 2:30 pm | Skiing Slopestyle Women's Final | Aspen, CO |
| 4:30 pm- 6 pm | Snowboard SuperPipe Women's Elimination | Aspen, CO |
| 7 pm- 8:30 pm | Snowboard SuperPipe Men's Elimination | Aspen, CO |
| 7 pm- 9 pm | Snowmobile Freestyle Final | Aspen, CO |

| | Friday, January 29, 2010 | |
| Time | Event | Location |
|---|---|---|
| 10 am- 11 am | Snowboard Snowboarder X Men's Qualifying | Aspen, CO |
| 10 am- 11 am | Snowboard Snowboarder X Women's Qualifying | Aspen, CO |
| 10 am- 12 pm | Snowboard Slopestyle Men's Elimination | Aspen, CO |
| 12 - 1:30 pm | Skier X Men's Qualifying | Aspen, CO |
| 12 - 1:30 pm | Skier X Women's Qualifying | Aspen, CO |
| 4:30 pm– 5:30 pm | Skiing SuperPipe Women's Final | Aspen, CO |
| 5:30 pm- 6 pm | Skiing Big Air Elimination | Aspen, CO |
| 6 pm- 7 pm | Snowmobile Best Trick Final | Aspen, CO |
| 7 pm- 7:30 pm | Skiing Big Air Final | Aspen, CO |
| 7:30 pm- 9 pm | Snowboard SuperPipe Men's Final | Aspen, CO |

| | Saturday, January 30, 2010 | |
| Time | Event | Location |
|---|---|---|
| 10:00 am– 11:00 am | Mono Skier X Qualifying | Aspen, CO |
| 10:00 am– 12:00 pm | Snowboard Slopestyle Women's Elimination | Aspen, CO |
| 2 pm- 3:30 pm | Snowboard Snowboarder X Men's Final | Aspen, CO |
| 2 pm- 3:30 pm | Snowboard Snowboarder X Women's Final | Aspen, CO |
| 2:30 pm- 4 pm | Skiing Slopestyle Men's Final | Aspen, CO |
| 5 pm- 6:30 pm | Skiing SuperPipe Men's Elimination | Aspen, CO |
| 7 pm- 7:30 pm | Snowboard Big Air Elimination | Aspen, CO |
| 7:30pm– 8:30 pm | Snowboard SuperPipe Women's Final | Aspen, CO |
| 8:30 pm- 9 pm | Snowboard Big Air Final | Aspen, CO |

| | Sunday January 31, 2010 | |
| Time | Event | Location |
|---|---|---|
| 10 am- 12:15 pm | Skier X Men's Final | Aspen, CO |
| 10 am- 12:15 pm | Skier X Women's Final | Aspen, CO |
| 10:15 am– 11:15 am | Snowmobile SnoCross Round 1 | Aspen, CO |
| 11:45 am- 12 pm | Snowmobile SnoCross Last Chance Qualifying | Aspen, CO |
| 12 pm- 1 pm | Snowboard Slopestyle Women's Final | Aspen, CO |
| 12:15 pm– 12:30 pm | Adaptive SnoCross | Aspen, CO |
| 1 pm- 1:30 pm | Snowmobile SnoCross Final | Aspen, CO |
| 1:30 pm– 2:45 pm | Mono Skier X Final | Aspen, CO |
| 2 pm- 3:30 pm | Snowboard Slopestyle Men's Final | Aspen, CO |
| 5 pm- 6:30 pm | Skiing SuperPipe Men's Final | Aspen, CO |
| 6:30 pm– 7:30 pm | Snowmobile Knock Out Final | Aspen, CO |
| 7:30 pm- 8 pm | Skiing SuperPipe High Air Final | Aspen, CO |

== Results ==
=== Medal Count ===
* Host nation (United States)

| Rank | Nation | Gold | Silver | Bronze | Total |
|---|---|---|---|---|---|
| 1 | United States (USA)* | 13 | 9 | 10 | 32 |
| 2 | Canada (CAN) | 2 | 5 | 3 | 10 |
| 3 | France (FRA) | 2 | 0 | 2 | 4 |
| 4 | Finland (FIN) | 1 | 0 | 0 | 1 |
| 4 | Iceland (ISL) | 1 | 0 | 0 | 1 |
| 4 | United Kingdom (UKB) | 1 | 0 | 0 | 1 |
| 7 | Norway (NOR) | 0 | 3 | 2 | 5 |
| 8 | Switzerland (SUI) | 0 | 1 | 1 | 2 |
| 9 | New Zealand (NZL) | 0 | 1 | 0 | 1 |
| 9 | Sweden (SWE) | 0 | 1 | 0 | 1 |
| 11 | Italy (ITA) | 0 | 0 | 1 | 1 |
| 11 | Japan (JPN) | 0 | 0 | 1 | 1 |
| Totals (12 entries) | | 20 | 20 | 20 | 60 |

=== Skiing ===
==== Men's Slopestyle Results ====
| Rank | Name | Run 1 | Run 2 | Run 3 | Score |
|---|---|---|---|---|---|
| Gold medal | Bobby Brown (USA) | 86.00 | 93.00 | 94.33 | 94.33 |
| Silver medal | Andreas Håtveit (NOR) | 90.66 | 65.55 | 92.00 | 92.00 |
| Bronze medal | Sammy Carlson (USA) | 88.33 | 40.00 | 89.33 | 89.33 |
| 4 | Phil Casabon (CAN) | 35.00 | 72.66 | 86.66 | 86.66 |
| 5 | Russ Henshaw (AUS) | 81.33 | 83.66 | 39.33 | 83.66 |
| 6 | Matt Walker (USA) | 24.33 | 83.00 | 31.00 | 83.00 |
| 7 | Jossi Wells (NZL) | 21.66 | 77.66 | 20.33 | 77.66 |
| 8 | Tom Wallisch (USA) | 41.66 | 60.00 | 72.33 | 72.33 |

==== Women's Slopestyle Results ====
| Rank | Name | Run 1 | Run 2 | Run 3 | Score |
|---|---|---|---|---|---|
| Gold medal | Kaya Turski (CAN) | 92.33 | 93.00 | 96.66 | 96.66 |
| Silver medal | Keri Herman (USA) | 85.00 | 34.66 | 33.66 | 85.00 |
| Bronze medal | Grete Eliassen (NOR) | 82.00 | 84.33 | 32.33 | 84.33 |
| 4 | Ashley Battersby (USA) | 36.00 | 83.66 | 79.66 | 83.66 |
| 5 | Megan Olenick (USA) | 79.33 | 13.00 | 43.66 | 79.33 |
| 6 | Sarah Burke (CAN) | 52.66 | 64.66 | 53.33 | 64.66 |
| 7 | Kristi Leskinen (USA) | 28.33 | 50.66 | 25.00 | 50.66 |

==== Men's SuperPipe Results ====
| Rank | Name | Run 1 | Run 2 | Run 3 | Score |
|---|---|---|---|---|---|
| Gold medal | Kevin Rolland (FRA) | 91.00 | 95.00 | 30.00 | 95.00 |
| Silver medal | Jossi Wells (NZL) | 90.33 | 54.00 | 92.00 | 92.00 |
| Bronze medal | Xavier Bertoni (FRA) | 87.66 | 87.00 | 90.00 | 90.00 |
| 4 | Simon Dumont (USA) | 89.66 | 48.33 | 89.00 | 89.66 |
| 5 | Duncan Adams (USA) | 84.00 | 88.33 | 88.00 | 88.33 |
| 6 | Tucker Perkins (USA) | 23.66 | 85.00 | 82.00 | 85.00 |
| 7 | Colby West (USA) | 19.33 | 81.66 | 35.00 | 81.66 |
| 8 | Peter Olenick (USA) | 9.00 | 40.66 | 10.33 | 40.66 |

==== Women's SuperPipe Results ====
| Rank | Name | Run 1 | Run 2 | Run 3 | Score |
|---|---|---|---|---|---|
| Gold medal | Jen Hudak (USA) | 90.33 | 92.33 | 81.66 | 92.33 |
| Silver medal | Megan Gunning (CAN) | 87.00 | 52.00 | 90.66 | 90.66 |
| Bronze medal | Rosalind Groenewoud (CAN) | 85.00 | 86.00 | 84.00 | 86.00 |
| 4 | Mirjam Jaeger (SUI) | 72.00 | 78.66 | 80.33 | 80.33 |
| 5 | Anais Caradeux (FRA) | 76.33 | 73.33 | 70.33 | 76.33 |
| 6 | Sarah Burke (CAN) | 59.66 | 73.66 | 65.00 | 73.6 |

==== Men's SuperPipe High Air Results ====
| Rank | Name | Height (inches) |
|---|---|---|
| Gold medal | Peter Olenick (USA) | 299 |
| Silver medal | Justin Dorey (CAN) | 285 |
| Bronze medal | Kevin Rolland (FRA) | 280 |
| 4 | Mike Riddle (CAN) | 277 |
| 5 | Xavier Bertoni (FRA) | 276 |
| 6 | Simon Dumont (USA) | 271 |

==== Men's Big Air Results ====
| Rank | Name | Two Highest Runs | Score |
|---|---|---|---|
| Gold medal | Bobby Brown (USA) | 50 + 50 | 100 |
| Silver medal | T.J. Schiller (CAN) | 50 + 45 | 95 |
| Bronze medal | Elias Ambuhl (SUI) | 46 + 44 | 90 |
| 4 | Russ Henshaw (AUS) | 47 + 42 | 89 |
| 5 | Jossi Wells (NZL) | 45 + 44 | 89 |

==== Men's Skier X Results ====
| Rank | Name | Quarterfinal Time | Semifinal Time | Final Time |
|---|---|---|---|---|
| Gold medal | Christopher Del Bosco (CAN) | 1:25.661 | 1:26.468 | 1:26.098 |
| Silver medal | Dave Duncan (CAN) | 1:27.642 | 1:28.900 | 1:26.578 |
| Bronze medal | Brady Leman (CAN) | 1:26.953 | 1:28.754 | 1:26.632 |
| 4 | Andreas Steffen (SUI) | 1:26.879 | 1:27.775 | 1:27.624 |
| 5 | Davey Barr (CAN) | 1:27.457 | 1:28.797 | 1:28.952 |
| 6 | John Teller (USA) | 1:27.161 | 1:26.929 | 1:29.053 |
| 7 | Stanley Hayer (CAN) | 1:27.852 | 1:59.499 | 1:28.658 |
| 8 | Armin Niederer (SUI) | 1:27.348 | 1:29.133 | 1:28.752 |
| 9 | Errol Kerr (JAM) | 1:26.725 | 1:28.115 | 1:29.001 |
| 10 | Olivier Fabre (FRA) | 1:29.261 | 1:30.218 | 1:29.348 |

==== Women's Skier X Results ====
| Rank | Name | Semifinal Time | Final Time |
|---|---|---|---|
| Gold medal | Ophelie David (FRA) | 1:33.429 | 1:34.037 |
| Silver medal | Ashleigh McIvor (CAN) | 1:33.496 | 1:34.187 |
| Bronze medal | Kelsey Serwa (CAN) | 1:33.875 | 1:34.557 |
| 4 | Fanny Smith (SUI) | 1:33.888 | 1:35.244 |
| 5 | Aleisha Cline (CAN) | 1:34.701 | 1:35.386 |
| 6 | Marte Gjefsen (NOR) | 1:34.902 | 1:36.182 |
| 7 | Danielle Poleschuk (CAN) | 1:37.885 | 1:38.728 |
| 8 | Caitlin Ciccone (USA) | 1:37.212 | 1:38.859 |
| 9 | Clara Marsan (AUT) | 1:38.340 | 1:39.118 |

==== Men's Mono Skier X Results ====
| Rank | Name | Semifinals Time | Final Time |
|---|---|---|---|
| Gold medal | Tyler Walker (USA) | 2:05.681 | 2:04.876 |
| Silver medal | Gregory Peck (USA) | 3:53.873 | 2:07.970 |
| Bronze medal | Kevin Connolly (USA) | 2:32.463 | 2:23.525 |
| 4 | Chris Devlin-Young (USA) | 2:07.627 | 5:00.000 |

=== Snowboarding ===
==== Men's SuperPipe Results ====
| Rank | Name | Run 1 | Run 2 | Run 3 | Score |
|---|---|---|---|---|---|
| Gold medal | Shaun White (USA) | 95.33 | 31.66 | 58.00 | 95.33 |
| Silver medal | Iouri Podladtchikov (SUI) | 50.00 | 93.00 | 93.66 | 93.66 |
| Bronze medal | Kazuhiro Kokubo (JPN) | 78.33 | 91.00 | 38.00 | 91.00 |
| 4 | Greg Bretz (USA) | 10.33 | 87.66 | 89.66 | 89.66 |
| 5 | J.J. Thomas (USA) | 42.00 | 82.33 | 34.33 | 82.33 |
| 6 | Steve Fisher (USA) | 70.00 | 74.66 | 42.00 | 74.66 |
| 7 | Luke Mitrani (USA) | 57.00 | 56.00 | 36.66 | 57.00 |
| 8 | Louie Vito (USA) | 40.00 | 46.66 | 35.66 | 46.66 |

==== Women's SuperPipe Results ====
| Rank | Name | Run 1 | Run 2 | Run 3 | Score |
|---|---|---|---|---|---|
| Gold medal | Gretchen Bleiler (USA) | 90.00 | 96.66 | 6.66 | 96.66 |
| Silver medal | Kelly Clark (USA) | 94.66 | 24.66 | 96.00 | 96.00 |
| Bronze medal | Hannah Teter (USA) | 44.33 | 70.00 | 25.33 | 70.00 |
| 4 | Soko Yamaoka (JPN) | 31.66 | 66.00 | 61.33 | 66.00 |
| 5 | Ellery Hollingsworth (USA) | 41.66 | 25.00 | 46.66 | 46.66 |
| 6 | Elena Hight (USA) | 39.33 | 13.00 | 15.33 | 39.33 |

==== Men's Snowboard X Results ====
| Rank | Name | Quarterfinal Time | Semifinal Time | Final Time |
|---|---|---|---|---|
| Gold medal | Nate Holland (USA) | 1:35.976 | 1:42.031 | 1:31.942 |
| Silver medal | Seth Wescott (USA) | 1:34.501 | 1:33.473 | 1:32.510 |
| Bronze medal | Alberto Schiavon (ITA) | 1:34.676 | 1:38.480 | 1:32.529 |
| 4 | Jayson Hale (USA) | 1:34.707 | 1:45.391 | 1:36.675 |
| 5 | J. J. Tomlinson (USA) | 1:35.064 | 1:34.423 | 1:42.662 |
| 6 | Nick Baumgartner (USA) | 1:34.493 | 1:33.626 | 1:45.771 |
| 7 | Graham Watanabe (USA) | 1:33.240 | 5:00.000 | 1:32.395 |
| 8 | Drew Neilson (CAN) | 1:33.811 | 1:51.706 | 1:32.658 |
| 9 | Ross Powers (USA) | 1:35.329 | 1:48.322 | 1:33.732 |
| 10 | Mario Fuchs (AUT) | 1:36.655 | 1:49.097 | 1:37.339 |
| 11 | David Speiser (GER) | 1:35.645 | 5:00.000 | 5:00.000 |

==== Women's Snowboard X Results ====
| Rank | Name | Semifinal Time | Final Time |
|---|---|---|---|
| Gold medal | Lindsey Jacobellis (USA) | 1:41.545 | 1:38.145 |
| Silver medal | Helene Olafsen (NOR) | 1:40.614 | 1:38.664 |
| Bronze medal | Joanie Anderson (USA) | 1:45.591 | 1:43.018 |
| 4 | Maria Ramberger (AUT) | 1:46.929 | 1:44.156 |
| 5 | Aleksandra Zhekova (BUL) | 1:50.456 | 1:44.509 |
| 6 | Emilie Aubry (SUI) | 2:07.700 | 1:45.394 |
| 7 | Faye Gulini (USA) | 1:56.609 | 1:44.702 |
| 8 | Callan Chythlook-Sifsof (USA) | 2:09.177 | 1:46.207 |
| 9 | Marni Yamada (USA) | 1:51.055 | 1:49.688 |
| 10 | Suzie Moll (USA) | 2:29.458 | 1:56.018 |
| 11 | Ziggy Cowan (CAN) | 1:49.790 | 1:56.206 |
| 12 | Kayla Klaus (CAN) | 2:13.273 | 2:20.129 |

==== Men's Big Air Results ====
| Rank | Name | Two Highest Runs | Score |
|---|---|---|---|
| Gold medal | Halldór Helgason (ISL) | 50 + 50 | 100 |
| Silver medal | Torstein Horgmo (NOR) | 47 + 47 | 94 |
| Bronze medal | Mikkel Bang (NOR) | 47 + 36 | 83 |
| 4 | Tyler Flanagan (USA) | 41 + 35 | 76 |
| 5 | Eero Ettala (FIN) | 37 + 35 | 72 |

==== Men's Slopestyle Results ====
| Rank | Name | Run 1 | Run 2 | Run 3 | Score |
|---|---|---|---|---|---|
| Gold medal | Eero Ettala (FIN) | 93.33 | 49.33 | 32.66 | 93.33 |
| Silver medal | Eric Willett (USA) | 86.33 | 38.00 | 38.33 | 86.33 |
| Bronze medal | Chas Guldemond (USA) | 70.00 | 84.33 | 41.00 | 84.33 |
| 4 | Torstein Horgmo (NOR) | 83.00 | 60.00 | 82.00 | 83.00 |
| 5 | Sage Kotsenburg (USA) | 80.00 | 23.33 | 75.33 | 80.00 |
| 6 | Mikkel Bang (NOR) | 62.66 | 21.33 | 35.33 | 62.66 |
| 7 | Tim Humphreys (USA) | 51.66 | 30.00 | 33.33 | 51.66 |
| 8 | Halldór Helgason (ISL) | 26.33 | 21.00 | 45.66 | 45.66 |

==== Women's Slopestyle Results ====
| Rank | Name | Run 1 | Run 2 | Run 3 | Score |
|---|---|---|---|---|---|
| Gold medal | Jenny Jones (GBR) | 80.00 | 46.66 | 92.66 | 92.66 |
| Silver medal | Jamie Anderson (USA) | 89.33 | 40.00 | 63.00 | 89.33 |
| Bronze medal | Janna Meyen-Weatherby (USA) | 23.33 | 73.33 | 75.66 | 75.66 |
| 4 | Kjersti Østgaard Buaas (NOR) | 31.66 | 19.66 | 43.33 | 43.33 |
| 5 | Hana Beaman (USA) | 35.00 | 27.66 | 28.33 | 35.00 |
| 6 | Cheryl Maas (NED) | 17.33 | 0.00 | 0.00 | 17.33 |

=== Men's Snowmobile ===
==== Freestyle Results ====
| Rank | Name |
|---|---|
| Gold medal | Justin Hoyer (USA) |
| Silver medal | Joe Parsons (USA) |
| Bronze medal | Caleb Moore (USA) |
| 4 | Daniel Bodin (SWE) |

==== Best Trick Results ====
| Rank | Name | Run 1 | Run 2 | Score |
|---|---|---|---|---|
| Gold medal | Heath Frisby (USA) | 88.33 | 90.66 | 90.66 |
| Silver medal | Daniel Bodin (SWE) | 89.33 | 87.33 | 89.33 |
| Bronze medal | Levi LaVallee (USA) | 89.00 | 89.00 | 89.00 |
| 4 | Joe Parsons (USA) | 85.00 | 87.66 | 87.66 |
| 5 | Colten Moore (USA) | 78.66 | 84.33 | 84.33 |
| 6 | Caleb Moore (USA) | 83.66 | 78.66 | 83.66 |
| 7 | Justin Hoyer (USA) | 83.33 | 75.00 | 83.33 |
| 8 | Paul Thacker (USA) | 77.66 | 81.00 | 81.00 |

==== Knock Out Results ====
This was a five-round contest in which the contestant with the shortest distance in each round was eliminated. The number listed represents the distance (in inches) of the best jump in given round.

| Rank | Name | Round 1 | Round 2 | Round 3 | Round 4 | Round 5 |
|---|---|---|---|---|---|---|
| Gold medal | Levi LaVallee (USA) | 1402 | 1542 | 1681 | 1887 | 2001 |
| Silver medal | Chris Burandt (USA) | 1419 | 1540 | 1692 | 1817 | 1886 |
| Bronze medal | Joe Parsons (USA) | 1315 | 1516 | 1674 | 1773 | - |
| 4 | Tucker Hibbert (USA) | 1279 | 1569 | 1615 | - | - |
| 5 | Robbie Malinoski (CAN) | 1410 | 1515 | - | - | - |
| 6 | Paul Thacker (USA) | 1145 | - | - | - | - |

==== Snocross Adaptive Results ====
| Rank | Name | Finish |
|---|---|---|
| Gold medal | Mike Schultz (USA) | 5:18.403 |
| Silver medal | Jim Wazny (USA) | 5:32.852 |
| Bronze medal | Doug Henry (USA) | 5:34.217 |
| 4 | Jeff Tweet (USA) | 5:56.507 |
| 5 | E. J. Poplawski (USA) | 11:02.254 |
| 6 | Travis Gavelle (USA) | 23:50.13 |
