= Winter X Games XV =

2011 winter sports event in Aspen, Colorado

Winter X Games XV (Winter X Games Fifteen)
- Location: (United States) Aspen, Colorado
- Dates: January 26–30

Winter X Games XV (styled as Winter X Games Fifteen in the official logo) were held from January 26 to January 30, 2011, in Aspen, Colorado. They are the 10th consecutive Winter X Games to be held in Aspen. The events were broadcast on ESPN.

== Sports ==
The following are the events at Winter X Games 15.

- Skiing
- Snowboarding
- Snowmobiling

== Highlights ==
- In the 2011 Aspen Winter X Games, Torstein Horgmo performed the first Triple cork in X Games history. He did this in the big air competition, coming in first place.

== Schedule ==
All times listed are Mountain Standard Time (MST).

	Wednesday, January 26, 2011	
Time	Event	Location
7:30pm – 8:30pm	Skiing SuperPipe Men's Elimination	Aspen, CO

	Thursday, January 27, 2011	
Time	Event	Location
10:00 am – 12:00 pm	Skiing Slopestyle Men's Elimination	Aspen, CO
11:30 am – 1:00 pm	Snowmobile Freestyle Elimination	Aspen, CO
1:00 pm – 2:30 pm	Skiing Slopestyle Women's Final	Aspen, CO
4:30 pm – 6:00 pm	Snowboard SuperPipe Women's Elimination	Aspen, CO
7:00 pm – 8:00 pm	Snowmobile Freestyle Round One	Aspen, CO
7:00 pm – 8:30 pm	Snowboard SuperPipe Men's Elimination	Aspen, CO
8:30 pm – 9:00 pm	Snowmobile Freestyle Final	Aspen, CO
9:00 pm – 9:40pm	Skiing SuperPipe Women's Final	Aspen, CO

	Friday, January 28, 2011	
Time	Event	Location
9:30 am – 11:00 am	Snowboard Snowboarder X Men's Qualifying	Aspen, CO
9:30 am – 11:00 am	Snowboard Snowboarder X Women's Qualifying	Aspen, CO
11:00 am – 1:00 pm	Snowboard Slopestyle Men's Elimination	Aspen, CO
12:00 pm – 1:30 pm	Skier X Men's Qualifying	Aspen, CO
12:00 pm – 1:30 pm	Skier X Women's Qualifying	Aspen, CO
2:00 pm – 3:00 pm	Snowmobile Speed & Style Seeding	Aspen, CO
4:45 pm – 6:15 pm	Skiing SuperPipe Men's Final	Aspen, CO
5:15 pm – 5:30 pm	Snowboard Best Method Final	Aspen, CO
6:15 pm – 6:45 pm	Snowmobile Speed & Style Quarterfinals	Aspen, CO
6:45 pm – 7:30 pm	Skiing Big Air Elimination	Aspen, CO
7:30 pm – 8:00 pm	Snowmobile Speed & Style Final	Aspen, CO
7:30 pm – 9:00 pm	Snowboard Men's Big Air Final	Aspen, CO

	Saturday, January 29, 2011	
Time	Event	Location
9:30 am – 10:30 am	Mono Skier X Qualifying	Aspen, CO
10:00 am – 11:30 am	Snowboard SuperPipe Women's Elimination	Aspen, CO
12:00 pm – 1:00 pm	Snowboard Snowboarder X Men's Final	Aspen, CO
2:00 pm – 2:30 pm	Snowboard Snowboarder X Women's Final	Aspen, CO
2:30 pm – 4:00 pm	Skiing Slopestyle Men's Final	Aspen, CO
6:00 pm – 6:30 pm	Snowboard Street Final	Aspen, CO
7:00 pm – 7:45 pm	Skiing Big Air Elimination	Aspen, CO
5:00 pm – 6:30 pm	Skiing SuperPipe Men's Elimination	Aspen, CO
7:45 pm – 8:30 pm	Snowboard SuperPipe Women's Final	Aspen, CO
8:30 pm – 9:00 pm	Skiing Big Air Final	Aspen, CO

	Sunday January 30, 2011	
Time	Event	Location
10:30 am – 11:15 am	Snowboard Slopestyle Women's Final	Aspen, CO
11:15 am – 1:15 pm	Skier X Men's Final	Aspen, CO
11:15 am – 1:15 pm	Skier X Women's Final	Aspen, CO
11:30 am – 12:00 pm	Snowmobile SnoCross Round 1	Aspen, CO
12:15 pm – 12:30 pm	Snowmobile SnoCross Last Chance Qualifying	Aspen, CO
12:45 pm – 1:00 pm	Adaptive SnoCross	Aspen, CO
1:15 pm – 1:45 pm	Snowmobile SnoCross Final	Aspen, CO
1:45 pm – 3:00 pm	Snowboard Slopestyle Men's Final	Aspen, CO
3:00 pm – 3:15 pm	Mono Skier X Semifinal	Aspen, CO
3:45 pm – 4:45 pm	Mono Skier X Final	Aspen, CO
5:30 pm – 6:00 pm	Snowmobile Best Trick Final	Aspen, CO
6:30 pm – 8:00 pm	Snowboard SuperPipe Men's Final	Aspen, CO

== Results ==
=== Medal Count ===
* Host nation (United States)

Rank	Nation	Gold	Silver	Bronze	Total
1	United States (USA)*	12	15	15	42
2	Canada (CAN)	6	5	3	14
3	Sweden (SWE)	2	0	0	2
4	France (FRA)	1	1	1	3
5	Norway (NOR)	1	0	2	3
6	Finland (FIN)	1	0	0	1
7	United Kingdom (UKB)	0	1	1	2
8	Australia (AUS)	0	1	0	1
9	Switzerland (SUI)	0	0	1	1
Totals (9 entries)		23	23	23	69

* Host nation (Host state (Vermont))

Rank	state	Gold	Silver	Bronze	Total
1	Vermont*	2	2	0	4
2	California	2	1	3	6
3	New Hampshire	2	1	1	4
4	Minnesota	2	1	0	3
5	Michigan	1	0	1	2
5	Oregon	1	0	1	2
5	Utah	1	0	1	2
8	Washington	1	0	0	1
9	Idaho	0	3	2	5
10	Colorado	0	3	1	4
11	Wisconsin	0	2	0	2
12	Alaska	0	1	1	2
12	Texas	0	1	1	2
14	Maine	0	0	1	1
14	Nevada	0	0	1	1
14	Ohio	0	0	1	1
Totals (16 entries)		12	15	15	42

=== Skiing ===
==== Men's Slopestyle Results ====
Rank	Name	Run 1	Run 2	Run 3	Score
Gold medal	Sammy Carlson (USA)	93.33	89.66	24.33	93.33
Silver medal	Russ Henshaw (AUS)	90.66	85.66	43.00	90.66
Bronze medal	Andreas Håtveit (NOR)	80.33	27.33	90.00	90.00
4	Bobby Brown (USA)	89.33	12.33	26.33	89.33
5	Henrik Harlaut (SWE)	86.33	21.66	21.66	86.33
6	Elias Ambühl (SUI)	74.66	33.33	27.00	74.66
7	Phil Casabon (CAN)	20.00	38.66	58.66	58.66
8	Gus Kenworthy (USA)	30.66	49.66	40.00	49.66

==== Women's Slopestyle Results ====
Rank	Name	Run 1	Run 2	Run 3	Score
Gold medal	Kaya Turski (CAN)	93.66	35.66	27.00	93.66
Silver medal	Keri Herman (USA)	70.00	35.33	93.33	93.33
Bronze medal	Grete Eliassen (NOR)	89.00	93.00	83.00	93.00
4	Ashley Battersby (USA)	88.00	92.00	83.33	92.00
5	Kim Lamarre (CAN)	86.00	82.33	91.33	91.33
6	Jessica Warll (CAN)	90.66	42.33	17.33	90.66
7	Anna Segal (AUS)	74.00	80.33	24.00	80.33
8	Megan Olenick (USA)	76.33	21.00	18.66	76.33
9	Maude Raymond (CAN)	26.66	75.00	28.33	75.00
10	Devin Logan (USA)	60.33	40.33	73.00	73.00

==== Men's SuperPipe Results ====
Rank	Name	Run 1	Run 2	Run 3	Score
Gold medal	Kevin Rolland (FRA)	13.00	70.66	93.66	93.66
Silver medal	Torin Yater-Wallace (USA)	14.66	87.66	92.66	92.66
Bronze medal	Simon Dumont (USA)	45.33	90.33	73.0	90.33
4	Duncan Adams (USA)	54.33	86.00	9.33	86.00
5	Thomas Krief (FRA)	83.33	17.00	20.33	83.33
6	Justin Dorey (CAN)	65.33	60.00	31.33	65.33
7	David Wise (USA)	56.66	14.66	9.66	56.66
8	Xavier Bertoni (FRA)	31.33	39.00	40.66	40.66

==== Women's SuperPipe Results ====
Rank	Name	Run 1	Run 2	Run 3	Score
Gold medal	Sarah Burke (CAN)	12.66	91.33	87.66	91.33
Silver medal	Brita Sigourney (USA)	6.33	86.00	70.66	86.00
Bronze medal	Rosalind Groenewoud (CAN)	75.33	80.00	84.00	84.00
4	Anais Caradeux (FRA)	80.66	82.33	36.00	82.33
5	Jen Hudak (USA)	43.33	78.00	60.00	78.00
6	Devin Logan (USA)	68.33	51.00	68.33	68.33

==== Men's Big Air Results ====
Rank	Name	Two Highest Runs	Score
Gold medal	Alex Schlopy (USA)	45 + 47	92
Silver medal	Bobby Brown (USA)	45 + 44	89
Bronze medal	Sammy Carlson (USA)	43 + 44	87
4	Elias Ambuhl (SUI)	45 + 38	83
5	Jacob Wester (SWE)	15 + 15	30

==== Men's Skier X Results ====
Rank	Name	Time
Gold medal	John Teller (USA)	1:21.17
Silver medal	Chris Del Bosco (CAN)	1:21.19
Bronze medal	Casey Puckett (USA)	1:21.97
4	Stan Rey (CAN)	1:23.23
5	Errol Kerr (JAM)	1:23.90
6	Brian Bennett (CAN)	1:24.47

==== Women's Skier X Results ====
Rank	Name	Time
Gold medal	Kelsey Serwa (CAN)	1:28.83
Silver medal	Ophélie David (FRA)	1:29.16
Bronze medal	Fanny Smith (SUI)	1:29.37
4	Danielle Poleschuk (CAN)	1:31.59
5	Julie Jensen (NOR)	1:33.70
6	Hedda Berntsen (NOR)	5:00.00

==== Men's Mono Skier X Results ====
Rank	Name	Time
Gold medal	Josh Dueck (CAN)	1:59.66
Silver medal	Brandon Adam (USA)	2:10.47
Bronze medal	Sean Rose (UK)	2:18.68
4	Scotty Meyer (USA)	5:00.00

=== Snowboarding ===
==== Men's SuperPipe Results ====
Rank	Name	Run 1	Run 2	Run 3	Score
Gold medal	Shaun White (USA)	89.00	97.33	46.66	97.33
Silver medal	Scotty Lago (USA)	92.00	7.00	30.33	92.00
Bronze medal	Louie Vito (USA)	84.00	24.00	87.33	87.33
4	Markus Malin (FIN)	86.33	44.33	32.66	86.33
5	Kazuhiro Kokubo (JPN)	82.66	85.00	85.33	85.33
6	Peetu Piiroinen (FIN)	83.33	45.00	48.33	83.33
7	Mathieu Crepel (FRA)	64.00	5.66	34.33	64.00
8	Matt Ladley (USA)	40.00	38.00	45.66	45.66

==== Women's SuperPipe Results ====
Rank	Name	Run 1	Run 2	Run 3	Score
Gold medal	Kelly Clark (USA)	92.33	50.00	83.00	92.33
Silver medal	Kaitlyn Farrington (USA)	85.66	40.00	78.00	85.66
Bronze medal	Elena Hight (USA)	21.66	30.00	80.00	80.00
4	Soko Yamaoka (JPN)	70.00	12.66	12.33	70.00
5	Queralt Castellet (ESP)	67.66	60.66	21.33	67.66
6	Gretchen Bleiler (USA)	27.66	15.33	24.33	27.66

==== Men's Snowboard X Results ====
Rank	Name	Time
Gold medal	Nick Baumgartner (USA)	1:29.70
Silver medal	Kevin Hill (CAN)	1:29.85
Bronze medal	Nate Holland (USA)	1:30.02
4	Seth Wescott (USA)	1:30.38
5	Jonathan Cheever (USA)	3:11.73
6	Pierre Vaultier (FRA)	5:00.00

==== Women's Snowboard X Results ====
Rank	Name	Time
Gold medal	Lindsey Jacobellis (USA)	1:38.94
Silver medal	Callan Chythlook-Sifsof (USA)	1:39.68
Bronze medal	Deborah Anthonioz (FRA)	1:40.02
4	Emilie Aubry (SUI)	1:43.14
5	Alexandra Jekova (BUL)	1:43.76
6	Dominique Maltais (CAN)	1:46.50

==== Men's Big Air Results ====
Rank	Name	Score
Gold medal	Torstein Horgmo (NOR)	80
Silver medal	Sebastien Toutant (CAN)	79
Bronze medal	Sage Kotsenburg (USA)	77
4	Mark McMorris (CAN)	73
5	Scotty Lago (USA)	59

==== Men's Slopestyle Results ====
Rank	Name	Run 1	Run 2	Run 3	Score
Gold medal	Sebastien Toutant (CAN)	93.00	38.33	42.00	93.00
Silver medal	Mark McMorris (CAN)	70.00	33.66	90.00	90.00
Bronze medal	Tyler Flanagan (USA)	28.00	82.66	27.66	82.66
4	Chas Guldemond (USA)	78.00	81.00	29.66	81.00
5	Mikkel Bang (NOR)	20.00	80.00	22.00	80.00
6	Torstein Horgmo (NOR)	28.00	33.00	47.66	47.66
7	Halldor Helgason (ISL)	14.33	20.00	18.00	20.00
8	Eric Willett (USA)	17.00	14.66	19.00	19.00

==== Women's Slopestyle Results ====
Rank	Name	Run 1	Run 2	Run 3	Score
Gold medal	Enni Rukajärvi (FIN)	22.00	73.00	92.66	92.66
Silver medal	Jenny Jones (UK)	89.33	28.66	45.66	89.33
Bronze medal	Jamie Anderson (USA)	86.00	32.66	75.66	86.00
4	Kjersti Oestgaard Buaas (NOR)	75.00	84.00	33.33	84.00
5	Sina Candrian (SUI)	81.33	14.66	28.33	81.33
6	Cheryl Maas (NED)	70.66	18.00	37.66	70.66
7	Hana Beaman (USA)	52.66	27.00	20.33	52.66
8	Janna Meyen-Weatherby (USA)	46.33	46.33	46.33	46.33
9	Shelly Gotlieb (NZL)	10.33	44.33	31.66	44.33
10	Spencer O'Brien (CAN)	39.66	34.33	25.66	39.66

==== Men's Snowboard Street Results ====
Rank	Name	Score
Gold medal	Nic Sauve (CAN)	85
Silver medal	Louis-Felix Paradis (CAN)	68
Bronze medal	Simon Chamberlain (CAN)	64
4	Jeremy Jones (USA)	55
5	Seth Huot (USA)	55
6	Joe Sexton (USA)	42
7	J.P. Walker (USA)	34

==== Men's Best Method Results ====
Rank	Name	Percentage
Gold medal	Scotty Lago (USA)	57%
Silver medal	Ross Powers (USA)	14%
Bronze medal	Chas Guldemond (USA)	11%
4	Mason Aguirre (USA)	7%
5	Jack Mitrani (USA)	6%
6	Greg Bretz (USA)	2%
7	Peter Line (USA)	2%
8	Mikkel Bang (NOR)	1%

=== Men's Snowmobile ===
==== Freestyle Results ====
Rank	Name
Gold medal	Daniel Bodin (SWE)
Silver medal	Justin Hoyer (USA)
Bronze medal	Caleb Moore (USA)
4	Joe Parsons (USA)

==== Speed & Style ====
Rank	Name
Gold medal	Joe Parsons (USA)
Silver medal	Heath Frisby (USA)
Bronze medal	Cory Davis (USA)
4	Daniel Bodin (SWE)

==== Best Trick Results ====
Rank	Name	Score
Gold medal	Daniel Bodin (SWE)	96.00
Silver medal	Caleb Moore (USA)	90.33
Bronze medal	Heath Frisby (USA)	86.00
4	Justin Hoyer (USA)	83.33
5	Colten Moore (USA)	82.33
6	Joe Parsons (USA)	81.66
7	Jimmy Fejes (USA)	69.66
8	Stian Pedersen (NOR)	65.00

==== SnoCross Results ====
Rank	Name
Gold medal	Tucker Hibbert (USA)
Silver medal	Ross Martin (USA)
Bronze medal	Robbie Malinoski (CAN)
4	Kyle Pallin (USA)
5	Dan Ebert (USA)
6	Cody Thomsen (USA)

==== SnoCross Adaptive Results ====
Rank	Name	Time
Gold medal	Mike Schultz (USA)	311.70
Silver medal	Jeff Tweet (USA)	353.74
Bronze medal	Jim Wazny (USA)	355.08
4	E.J. Poplawski (USA)	385.59
5	Dave Turner (USA)	400.18
6	Doug Henry (USA)	407.34
7	Jesse Gildea (USA)	410.84
8	Chris Heppding (USA)	413.44
