= Winter X Games XVII =

2013 extreme sports tournament

Winter X Games XVII (Winter X Games Seventeen)
- Location: (United States) Aspen, Colorado; Tignes, France
- Dates: (United States) USA: January 24–27; France: March 20–22

Winter X Games XVII (re-titled Winter X Games Aspen '13; styled as Winter X Games Seventeen in the official logo) were held from January 24 to January 27, 2013, in Aspen, Colorado. They were the 12th consecutive Winter X Games to be held in Aspen. The events were broadcast on ESPN. That year, the Winter X Games were also held in Tignes, France, from March 20 to 22. Events included skiing, snowboarding, and snowmobiling.

== Sports ==
The following were the events at Winter X Games 17.

- Skiing
- Snowboarding
- Snowmobiling

== Results ==
=== Medal count ===
* Host nation (United States)

Rank	Nation	Gold	Silver	Bronze	Total
1	United States (USA)*	10	8	7	25
2	Canada (CAN)	2	4	4	10
3	Sweden (SWE)	2	1	0	3
4	Norway (NOR)	2	0	1	3
5	Switzerland (SUI)	0	1	1	2
6	Czech Republic (CZE)	0	1	0	1
6	Japan (JPN)	0	1	0	1
8	Belgium (BEL)	0	0	1	1
8	Finland (FIN)	0	0	1	1
8	Great Britain (GBR)	0	0	1	1
Totals (10 entries)		16	16	16	48

=== Skiing ===
==== Men's Slopestyle results ====
Rank	Name	Run 1	Run 2	Run 3	Best Score
Gold medal	Nick Goepper (USA)	92.33	89.00	94.00	94.00
Silver medal	Henrik Harlaut (SWE)	59.33	87.00	92.66	92.66
Bronze medal	James Woods (GBR)	91.33	17.66	92.00	92.00
4	Alex Bellemare (CAN)	83.66	88.00	90.66	90.66
5	Andreas Håtveit (NOR)	90.33	22.33	87.66	90.33
6	Bobby Brown (USA)	88.66	85.66	85.33	88.66
7	Alex Schlopy (USA)	25.33	85.66	87.33	87.33
8	Joss Christensen (USA)	78.33	24.00	85.00	85.00

==== Women's Slopestyle results ====
Rank	Name	Run 1	Run 2	Run 3	Best Score
Gold medal	Tiril Sjåstad Christiansen (NOR)	9.33	91.33	92.33	92.33
Silver medal	Kaya Turski (CAN)	33.66	13.33	90.00	90.00
Bronze medal	Dara Howell (CAN)	21.66	89.33	16.33	89.33
4	Ashley Battersby (USA)	28.00	88.66	33.33	88.66
5	Keri Herman (USA)	84.66	88.33	25.66	88.33
6	Yuki Tsubota (CAN)	87.66	85.33	30.66	87.66
7	Jamie Crane-Mauzy (USA)	15.66	31.66	74.33	74.33

==== Men's SuperPipe results ====
Rank	Name	Run 1	Run 2	Run 3	Best Score
Gold medal	David Wise (USA)	94.33	95.66	71.66	95.66
Silver medal	Torin Yater-Wallace (USA)	90.00	92.00	93.00	93.00
Bronze medal	Simon Dumont (USA)	79.33	80.66	85.66	85.66
4	Kevin Rolland (FRA)	84.66	58.33	73.00	84.66
5	Joffrey Pollet-Villard (FRA)	82.66	48.33	79.00	82.66
6	Tucker Perkins (USA)	78.66	78.33	67.33	78.66
7	Aaron Blunck (USA)	53.66	74.66	32.66	74.66
8	Benoit Valentin (FRA)	63.66	27.33	6.66	63.66

==== Women's SuperPipe results ====
Rank	Name	Run 1	Run 2	Run 3	Score
Gold medal	Maddie Bowman (USA)	91.33	12.33	72.00	91.33
Silver medal	Roz Groenewoud (CAN)	69.66	86.66	34.66	86.66
Bronze medal	Megan Gunning (CAN)	75.33	83.33	85.00	85.00
4	Keltie Hansen (CAN)	84.33	12.33	10.66	84.33
5	Brita Sigourney (USA)	26.33	67.00	82.66	82.66
6	Annalisa Drew (USA)	81.00	12.33	12.66	81.00
7	Jen Hudak (USA)	74.66	60.66	77.66	77.66
8	Anais Caradeux (FRA)	28.66	11.33	61.66	61.66

==== Men's Big Air results ====
Rank	Name	Score
Gold medal	Henrik Harlaut (SWE)	97
Silver medal	Kai Mahler (SUI)	91
Bronze medal	Elias Ambühl (SUI)	89
4	Bobby Brown (USA)	86
5	Gus Kenworthy (USA)	81
6	PK Hunder (NOR)	79

=== Snowboarding ===
==== Men's Slopestyle results ====
Rank	Name	Run 1	Run 2	Run 3	Score
Gold medal	Mark McMorris (CAN)	94.66	17.66	98.00	98.00
Silver medal	Max Parrot (CAN)	90.00	32.66	14.00	90.00
Bronze medal	Seppe Smits (BEL)	85.00	65.00	51.66	85.00
4	Chas Guldemond (USA)	80.00	17.66	21.00	80.00
5	Shaun White (USA)	71.00	20.00	14.00	71.00
6	Peetu Piiroinen (FIN)	26.66	24.33	66.00	66.00
7	Aleksander Oestreng (NOR)	55.00	18.00	32.33	55.00
8	Gjermund Braaten (NOR)	13.33	18.00	15.33	18.00

==== Women's Snowboard Slopestyle results ====
Rank	Name	Score
Gold medal	Jamie Anderson (USA)	93.00
Silver medal	Šárka Pančochová (CZE)	90.00
Bronze medal	Spencer O'Brien (CAN)	88.66
4	Enni Rukajärvi (FIN)	83.33
5	Sina Candrian (SUI)	70.33
6	Kjersti Oestgaard Buaas (NOR)	38.00
7	Silje Norendal (NOR)	30.33
8	Aimee Fuller (GBR)	18.66

==== Men's SuperPipe results ====
Rank	Name	Run 1	Run 2	Run 3	Score
Gold medal	Shaun White (USA)	95.00	98.00	17.33	98.00
Silver medal	Ayumu Hirano (JPN)	45.00	92.33	19.66	92.33
Bronze medal	Markus Malin (FIN)	14.33	91.33	37.66	91.33
4	Scotty Lago (USA)	90.00	48.00	1.00	90.00
5	Greg Bretz (USA)	80.00	30.00	84.66	84.66
6	Louie Vito (USA)	4.66	21.66	73.33	73.33
7	Christian Haller (SUI)	5.66	18.00	36.66	36.66

==== Women's SuperPipe results ====
Rank	Name	Run 1	Run 2	Run 3	Score
Gold medal	Kelly Clark (USA)	27.66	87.33	90.33	90.33
Silver medal	Elena Hight (USA)	90.00	35.66	33.33	90.00
Bronze medal	Arielle Gold (USA)	75.00	85.00	82.33	85.00
4	Torah Bright (AUS)	33.33	82.00	10.66	82.00
5	Hannah Teter (USA)	13.00	80.00	81.00	81.00
6	Queralt Castellet (ESP)	78.00	21.33	26.66	78.00
7	Kaitlyn Farrington (USA)	64.33	23.00	50.00	64.33
8	Maddy Schaffrick (USA)	25.00	24.66	8.00	25.00

==== Men's Big Air results ====
Rank	Name	Score
Gold medal	Torstein Horgmo (NOR)	94†
Silver medal	Mark McMorris (CAN)	94
Bronze medal	Stale Sandbech (NOR)	91
4	Seppe Smits (BEL)	68
5	Ulrik Badertscher (NOR)	52
6	Sebastien Toutant (CAN)	48

† Horgmo won because he had the higher single run score (50).

==== Men's Snowboard Street results ====
Rank	Name	Score
Gold medal	Louis-Felix Paradis (CAN)	75
Silver medal	Dylan Alito (USA)	62
Bronze medal	Dylan Thompson (USA)	59
4	Jaeger Bailey (USA)	56
5	Ryan Paul (USA)	54
6	Dan Brisse (USA)	52

=== Snowmobile ===
==== Freestyle results ====
Rank	Name	Run 1	Run 2	Score
Gold medal	Levi LaVallee (USA)	88.33	89.00	89.00
Silver medal	Joe Parsons (USA)	88.66	88.00	88.66
Bronze medal	Justin Hoyer (USA)	84.00	85.66	85.66
4	Daniel Bodin (SWE)	83.33	–	83.33
5	Cory Davis (USA)	82.00	82.00	82.00
6†	Caleb Moore (USA)	57.66	–	57.66
7	Colten Moore (USA)	49.33	–	49.33

† Caleb Moore died on January 31, 2013, after sustaining head and heart injuries during the event.

==== Speed & Style ====
Rank	Name	Score
Gold medal	Levi LaVallee (USA)	90.963
Silver medal	Cory Davis (USA)	85.66
Bronze medal	Joe Parsons (USA)	88.33

==== SnoCross ====
Rank	Name
Gold medal	Tucker Hibbert (USA)
Silver medal	Ross Martin (USA)
Bronze medal	Tim Tremblay (CAN)
4	Emil Ohman (SWE)
5	Petter Norsa (SWE)
6	Kody Kamm (USA)

==== SnoCross Adaptive ====
Rank	Name	Time
Gold medal	Mike Schultz (USA)	4:51.882
Silver medal	Doug Henry (USA)	4:53.151
Bronze medal	Garret Goodwin (USA)	4:58.204
4	Jim Wazny (USA)	5:23.134
5	Dave Turner (USA)	5:33.011
6	Paul Thacker (USA)	-
7	Chris Heppding (USA)	-
8	Daryl Tait (USA)	-

==== Best Trick ====
Rank	Name	Score
Gold medal	Daniel Bodin (SWE)	92.33
Silver medal	Joe Parsons (USA)	91.66
Bronze medal	Heath Frisby (USA)	89.00
4	Cory Davis (USA)	79.33
5	Willie Elam (USA)	77.66
6	Jackson Strong (AUS)	72.33
