= Winter X Games XI =

2007 extreme sports tournament in Aspen, Colorado, US

Winter X Games XI (Winter X Games Eleven)
- Location: (United States) Aspen, Colorado
- Dates: January 25–28

Winter X Games XI were held from January 25, 2007 to January 28, 2007 in Aspen, Colorado. They were the 6th consecutive Winter X Games to be held in Aspen. Television coverage of Winter X Games XI was broadcast on ESPN and ABC, primarily hosted by Sal Masekela and Todd Harris. Final attendance for the four-day event was 76,150.

== Disciplines ==
Disciplines at the 11th Winter X Games were:

- Skiing
- Snowboarding
- Snowmobiling

== Results ==
=== Skiing ===
Men and Women's Monoski Cross

| Place | Athlete | Time |
|---|---|---|
| Gold | Tyler Walker | 84.868 |
| Silver | Kevin Connolly | 84.930 |
| Bronze | Kees-Jan van der Klooster | 93.480 |

Men's Ski Cross

| Place | Athlete | Time |
|---|---|---|
| Gold | Casey Puckett | 57.958 |
| Silver | Jack Fiala |
| Bronze | Enak Gavaggio |

Women's Ski Cross

| Place | Athlete | Time |
|---|---|---|
| Gold | Ophelie David | 65.367 |
| Silver | Valentine Scuotto |
| Bronze | Meryll Boulangeat |

Men's Ski Slopestyle

| Place | Athlete | Score |
|---|---|---|
| Gold | Candide Thovex | 95.00 |
| Silver | Sammy Carlson | 92.33 |
| Bronze | Colby West | 90.00 |

Men's Ski SuperPipe

| Place | Athlete | Score |
|---|---|---|
| Gold | Tanner Hall | 95.00 |
| Silver | Simon Dumont | 94.00 |
| Bronze | Peter Olenick | 90.00 |

Women's Ski SuperPipe

| Place | Athlete | Score |
|---|---|---|
| Gold | Sarah Burke | 90.00 |
| Silver | Grete Eliassen | 86.33 |
| Bronze | Jen Hudak | 66.33 |

=== Snowboarding ===
Men's Snowboard Best Trick

| Place | Athlete |
|---|---|
| Gold | Andreas Wiig |
| Silver | Travis Rice |
| Bronze | Antti Autti |

Men's Snowboard Cross

| Place | Athlete | Time |
|---|---|---|
| Gold | Nate Holland | 64.796 |
| Silver | Xavier de le Rue |
| Bronze | Seth Wescott |

Women's Snowboard Cross

| Place | Athlete | Time |
|---|---|---|
| Gold | Joanie Anderson | 71.387 |
| Silver | Lindsey Jacobellis |
| Bronze | Maëlle Ricker |

Men's Snowboard Slopestyle

| Place | Athlete | Score |
|---|---|---|
| Gold | Andreas Wiig | 89.66 |
| Silver | Jussi Oksanen | 84.66 |
| Bronze | Shaun White | 83.33 |

Women's Snowboard Slopestyle

| Place | Athlete | Score |
|---|---|---|
| Gold | Jamie Anderson | 85.33 |
| Silver | Hana Beaman | 78.33 |
| Bronze | Chanelle Sladics | 76.33 |

Men's Snowboard SuperPipe

| Place | Athlete | Score |
|---|---|---|
| Gold | Steve Fisher | 92.00 |
| Silver | Shaun White | 91.00 |
| Bronze | Mason Aguirre | 90.66 |

Women's Snowboard SuperPipe

| Place | Athlete | Score |
|---|---|---|
| Gold | Torah Bright | 94.66 |
| Silver | Gretchen Bleiler | 91.00 |
| Bronze | Elena Hight | 88.00 |

=== Snowmobiling ===
Snocross

| Place | Athlete | Time |
|---|---|---|
| Gold | Tucker Hibbert | 186.226 |
| Silver | Ryan Simons | 186.543 |
| Bronze | T.J. Gulla | 192.684 |

Snowmobile Freestyle

| Place | Athlete | Score |
|---|---|---|
| Gold | Chris Burandt | 96.33 |
| Silver | Aleksander Nordgaard | 93.66 |
| Bronze | Heath Frisby | 89.33 (in consolation) |
