= Schlopy =

Schlopy is a surname. Notable people with the surname include:

- Alex Schlopy (born 1992), American skier
- Erik Schlopy (born 1972), American skier
- Todd Schlopy (born 1961), American football player and movie cameraman
