= Chanelle Sladics =

American snowboarder, surfer, and skateboarder

Personal information
- Born: November 17, 1984 (age 42) Newport Beach, California, U.S.
- Home town: San Diego, California/ Breckenridge, Colorado
- Height: 5 ft 4 in (1.63 m)
- Website: www.chanellesladics.com

Sport
- Country: United States
- Sport: Snowboarding
Medal record
Women's Snowboarding
Winter X Games
Bronze medal – third place	2007 Aspen	Slopestyle

Chanelle Sladics (born November 17, 1984) is an American professional snowboarder, surfer, and skateboarder. She is a competitor in women's slopestyle and rail jams. She has competed in seven Winter X Games and won a bronze medal in the 2007 slopestyle competition. She was finished in the top ten of the TTR World Snowboard Tour in 2009. Sladics has also served as an on-air reporter for ESPN during the Winter X Games.

== Early life ==
Sladics was born and raised in Newport Beach, California. She started skateboarding and waterskiing at the age of two and a half and at the age of four she began soccer and joined a swim team. At the age of seven, she started to play roller hockey.

After a two year recovery from an injury, she took up snowboarding. After two lessons she was sponsored to enter a slopestyle pro/am event. She took second place in the event. She withdrew from club soccer and joined USASA (United States of America Snowboard Association) the following season.

== Career ==
Sladics competed on weekends at Big Bear Mountain in Southern California. She won a gold medal at the USASA Junior World Championships in New Zealand and earned a spot at the X Games. In 2004, Sladics was featured on MTV's extreme sport feature show, The Triple Threat. Following her participation on the show, she competed in surf, snow, and skate competitions around the world. She won first place in the Queen of the Mountain Rail contest and second place in Queen of the Mountain Slopestyle.

In 2005, Sladics placed third in the Abominable Snowjam Slopestyle competition, and second in the Grand Prix Mt. Bachelor Slopestyle. In 2006, she took two second place spots at the Abominable Snow Jam and came won the Boardfest Rail Jam.

In 2007, Sladics won a Bronze Medal in the slopestyle competition in the Winter X Games. She achieved first place finishes in the Boardfest Triple Threat Even and the Boardfest Rail Jam. In 2008, she placed third at the Supergirl Rail Jam, second at the Roxy Chicken Jam Slopestyle and third in the Vans Tahoe Cup Slopestyle.

Sladics spent the 2008 snowboard season filming with Oakley's Women's film, Uniquely. More than one million copies of the film were distributed. In 2009, she appeared in Runaway Film's See What I See. That year Sladics hosted MTV2’s Skills and Thrills: Alli's All-Star and True Players and Alli Athletes to Watch; she also won two competitions and took prizes in four others.

In 2012 and 2013, she served as an on-air reporter for ESPN for the X Games Aspen and X Games Tignes. In 2013, she was filmed in a race with a McLaren 12C Spider as part of a promotion for the new automobile model. That year she organized a Women's Empowerment Week in Fiji.

In 2013, Sladics created an all-women pro snowboarding slopestyle competition in the US called The Super Girl SnowPro Community Cup. This event showcases women's snowboarding alongside art, music, yoga, eco workshops, and other female-inspired activities.

In 2017, Sladics is the co-proprietor of the company Simply Straws.

== Philanthropy ==
In July 2010, Sladics was part of a group that partnered with "Keep-A-Breast" and "My Little Footprint" to construct a greenhouse from recycled plastic bottles and bamboo. After the greenhouse was complete, they donated it to a local Bartiooche School to help educate them on gardening and green practices. She contributes to the Action Sports Environmental Coalition (ASEC) and Protecting Our Playground-NATURE! Sladics is an ambassador for Protect our Winters and a member of the Women's Sports Foundation. In October 2010, Sladics shot a PSA for Product RED, Dell, and Threadless.com to promote an online competition to raise funds to eliminate AIDS in Africa.
