= Janna Meyen =

Personal information
- Full name: Janna Meyen-Weatherby
- Born: 1977 (age 48–49) Big Bear Lake, California, U.S.
- Height: 5 ft 7 in (170 cm)
- Weight: 145 lb (66 kg)
Medal record
Snowboarding
Representing United States
Winter X Games
Gold medal – first place	2003 Aspen	Women's Slopestyle
Gold medal – first place	2004 Aspen	Women's Slopestyle
Gold medal – first place	2005 Aspen	Women's Slopestyle
Gold medal – first place	2006 Aspen	Women's Slopestyle
Silver medal – second place	2002 Aspen	Women's Slopestyle
Bronze medal – third place	2010 Aspen	Women's Slopestyle

Janna Meyen-Weatherby (born 1977 or 1978) is a retired American slopestyle snowboarder. Meyen won gold at the Winter X Games from 2003 to 2006 and became the first athlete to win gold four times in a row at Winter X. She was nominated for the Best Female Action Sports Athlete ESPY Award in 2005 and 2006 and retired from competition in 2012.

== Early life and education ==
Meyen spent her childhood in Big Bear Lake, California and began to snowboard as a teenager.

== Career ==
Meyen began her X Games career as a boardercross snowboarder in 1997 before moving to slopestyle in 2000. Her first medal at the Winter X Games was a silver medal in 2002 in slopestyle. The next year, she won a gold in 2003 with additional gold medals each year until 2006. As a four-time gold medalist, Meyen became the first athlete of the Winter X Games to come in first four years in a row.

In 2010, Meyen declared that she was going to retire from snowboarding in 2012. During her final years of competition, Meyen won a bronze medal at the 2010 Winter X Games and did not medal at the 2011 Winter X Games.

Outside of the X Games, Meyen won the 1991 USASA Snowboarding National Championships as an amateur snowboarder. Other first places for Meyen include the 1991 Burton U.S. Open in halfpipe and the 2005 Burton U.S. Open in slopestyle. Alternatively, Meyen won silver at the 2002 World Snowboarding Championship.

== Awards and honors ==
In 2005, she was nominated for the Best Female Action Sports Athlete ESPY Award. Meyen was nominated for the same award in 2006.

== Personal life ==
Meyen is married and has two children.
