= Torstein Horgmo =

Norwegian snowboarder

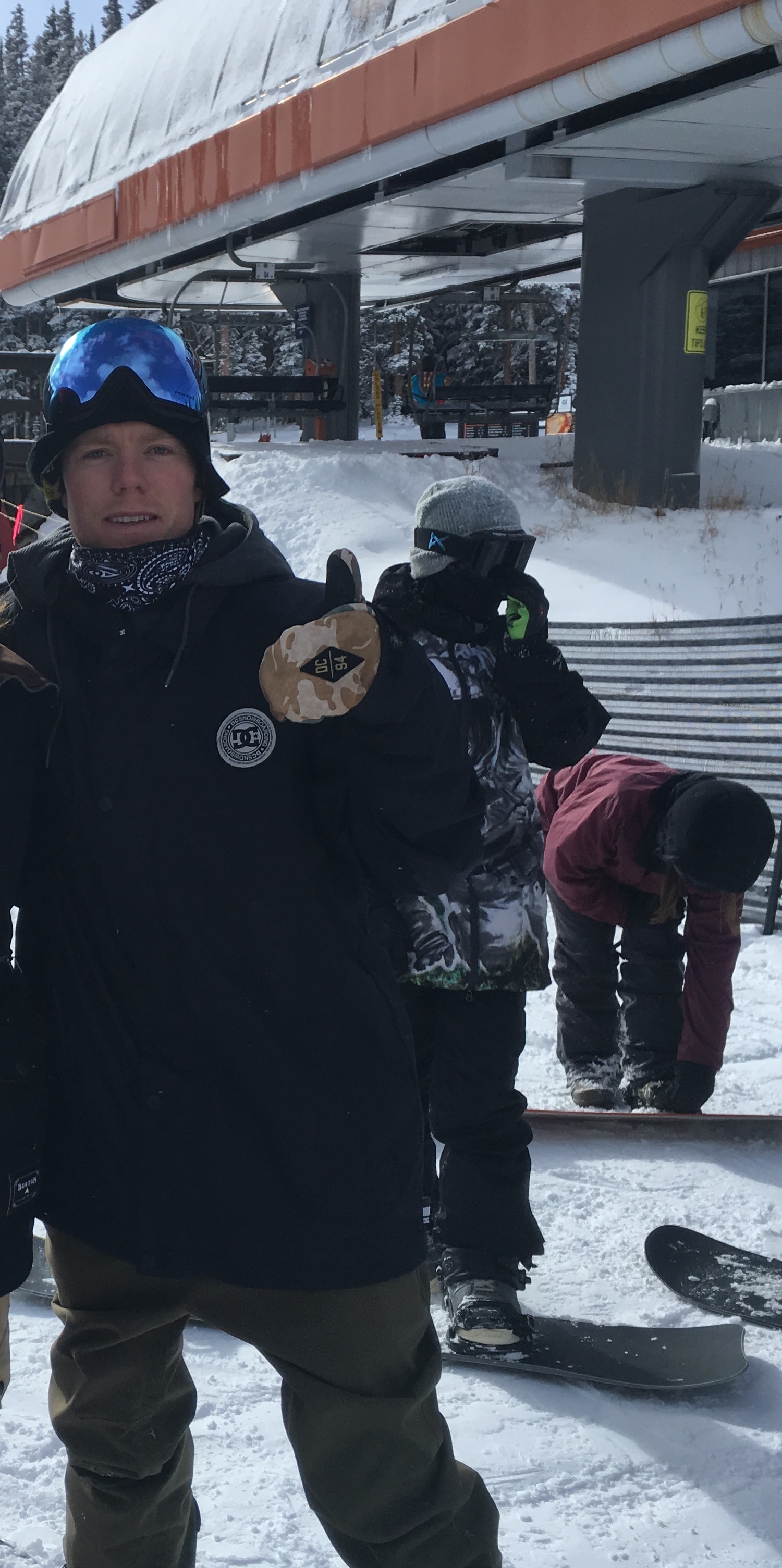
- Horgmo at Copper Mountain Terrain Park, 2016

Personal information
- Full name: Torstein Horgmo
- Nickname: Torg
- Nationality: Norwegian
- Born: 18 February 1987 (age 39) Trondheim, Norway
- Height: 5 ft 8 in (173 cm)
- Weight: 154 lb (70 kg)
- Website: torstein.net

Sport
- Country: Norway
- Sport: Snowboarding
- Coached by: Per Iver Grimsrud
Medal record
Men's snowboarding
Representing Norway
Winter X Games
Gold medal – first place	2008 Aspen	Big Air
Gold medal – first place	2011 Aspen	Big Air
Gold medal – first place	2013 Aspen	Big Air
Silver medal – second place	2009 Aspen	Big Air
Silver medal – second place	2010 Aspen	Big Air
Silver medal – second place	2012 Aspen	Big Air
Winter Dew Tour
Gold medal – first place	2009 Northstar-at-Tahoe	Slopestyle
Silver medal – second place	2009 Dew Cup	Slopestyle

Torstein Horgmo (born 18 February 1987) is a Norwegian professional snowboarder. Horgmo has competed, and medalled in, a variety of slopestyle and big air snowboarding competitions. He rides regular stance.

== Personal ==
Horgmo grew up in Trondheim, Norway, before eventually moving to Oslo. Horgmo first began snowboarding when he was twelve years old, prior to which he had only skied. Horgmo is a DC Shoes rider with many sponsors including Oakley, Inc., DNB ASA, GoPro, and others. In 2012 he released his own film titled "Horgasm – A Love Story", chronicling his snowboarding career over the course of two years. Horgmo started his company, AWSM brand, along with fellow rider Andreas Wiig. He has been seen riding with Mark McMorris many times. Horgmo is often featured in a YouTube channel called "ShredBots," which was started with McMorris and Eero Ettala.

== Competition history ==
Horgmo won a gold medal in Snowboard Big Air at the 2008 Winter X Games XII in Aspen, Colorado, after first beating Travis Rice in the finals, and Kevin Pearce in the semifinal. He also won gold in the slopestyle final at the 2009 Winter Dew Tour, beating Shaun White, who won the Slopestyle Final in Breckenridge, Colorado. At the 2009 Winter X Games XIII, Horgmo was defeated in Big Air by friend and teammate Travis Rice. This event trialed the text-voting system as the only judging system. The riders, including Rice himself, have stated that they do not believe that this voting system produces fair results, as nationality, popularity, and crowd appeal of the tricks can outweigh the technicality of the trick itself. Horgmo performed switch backside 1260's, but was defeated by Rice's backside double rodeo 1080.

In Dew Tour winter 2009/10 he took two first place victories over Shaun White in slopestyle.

In the summer of 2010 he was the first to land a triple cork (three off axis flips and four full rotations before coming back in contact with the ground) off a 100 ft jump in Folgefonna, Norway. In the Winter X Games XV Horgmo landed an attempt of the triple cork in competition in the Big Air finals on 28 January 2011, winning a gold medal over Sebastien Toutant.

Horgmo followed this up in January 2012 landing a true triple cork 1440 in the Winter X Games Big Air Final, scoring a perfect score of 50/50. This triple cork however was a backside spin instead of his previous frontside spin triple. Horgmo finished in second place, narrowly losing to Mark McMorris.

At the Winter X Games Aspen in January 2013, Horgmo was the first person to land a switch backside triple cork 1440 in competition, earning him a perfect score of 50/50 for the second year in a row and the gold medal in Big Air. In competitions following Horgmo was able to win slopestyle gold and silver in the Burton European and US Opens respectively. In the Burton US Open, Horgmo was the only rider to land a triple cork on the slopestyle course, but lost to Shredbots teammate Mark McMorris by a narrow margin.

Horgmo qualified for the 2014 Winter Olympics in Sochi; however, while practicing in Sochi, he fell and broke a clavicle, which forced him to miss the Olympics.

== Results ==
Career Highlights

2015: 3rd, Burton European Open Slopestyle

2015: 6, X Games Aspen 2015 Snowboard Men's Snowboard Slopestyle

2015: 6, X Games Aspen 2015 Snowboard Big Air

2013: 1st, FIS Snowboarding World Cup Slopestyle in Czech Republic

2013: 2nd, Burton US Open Slopestyle

2013: 1st, Burton European Open Slopestyle,

2013: Gold Medal, Winter X Games Big Air

2012: Silver Medal, Winter X Games Big Air

2011: 2nd, Air & Style Beijing Big Air

2011: Gold Medal, Winter X Games Big Air

2011: 1st, Dew Tour Slopestyle – Connecticut

2011: 1st, Dew Tour Slopestyle – Colorado

2011: 1st Overall, Dew Tour Season Standings Slopestyle

2010: 1st, Dew Tour Slopestyle – Mt. Snow

2010: 2nd Overall, Dew Tour Slopestyle

2010: 2nd, Oakley Arctic Challenge Slopestyle

2010: Silver Medal, X Games Big Air

2009: 1st, Dew Tour Slopestyle – Mt. Snow

2009: 1st, Dew Tour Slopestyle – Northstar-at-Tahoe, California

2009: 1st Mt Snow Dew Tour Slopestyle

2009: 1st Tahoe Dew Tour Slopestyle

2009: Silver Medal, Winter X Games Big Air

2009: 2nd, Red Bull Snowscrapers Best Trick

2009: 2nd, Andreas Wiig Invitational

2008: Gold Medal, Winter X-Games Big Air

2008: 1st, U.S. Open Big Air

2007: Abominable Snow Jam Overall Winner

2007: 3rd, Air & Style Big Air

2007: 1st Overall, Oakley Stylewars

=== Swatch TTR World Tour events 2007/08 season ===
Event	Discipline	Stars	Result
Abominable Snowjam 07	HP	5star	11
Abominable Snowjam 07	SS	5star	1
Garnier Fructis Australian Open 07	SS	4star	2
Garnier Fructis Australian Open 07	HP	4star	4
Stylewars 007 by Oakley 07	SS	3star	1
Nokia Air & Style Munich 07	SS	6star	3
