= Sage Kotsenburg =

American snowboarder (b. 1993)

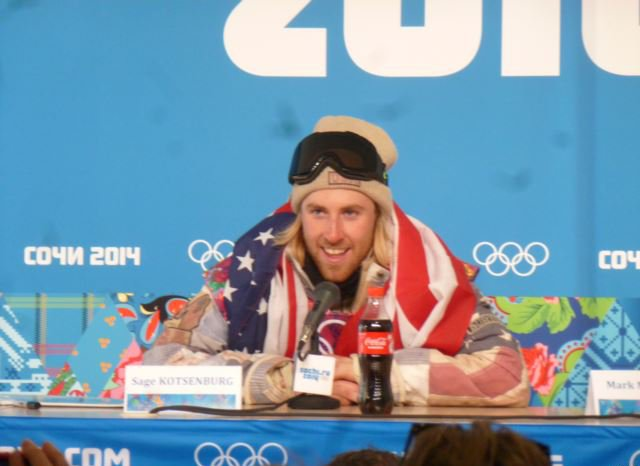
- Kotsenburg in 2014

Personal information
- Born: Sage Cullen Kotsenburg; July 27, 1993 (age 32) Coeur d'Alene, Idaho, U.S.
- Height: 5 ft 10 in (178 cm) (2014)
- Weight: 165 lb (75 kg) (2014)

Sport
- Country: United States
- Sport: Snowboarding
- Events: Big Air; Slopestyle
- Turned pro: 2010

Achievements and titles
- Olympic finals: 2014
Medal record
Olympic Games
Gold medal – first place	2014 Sochi	Slopestyle
Winter X Games
Silver medal – second place	2010 Tignes	Slopestyle
Silver medal – second place	2012 Aspen	Slopestyle
Bronze medal – third place	2011 Aspen	Big Air

Sage Kotsenburg (born July 27, 1993) is an American snowboarder. He won the first-ever Olympic gold medal in men's snowboard slopestyle at the 2014 Winter Olympic Games in Sochi, Russia, and became the first gold medalist at these Olympics. Kotsenburg won a silver medal in snowboard slopestyle at the 2012 Winter X Games XVI in Aspen, Colorado, behind Mark McMorris. Kotsenburg won a bronze medal in Snowboard Big Air at the 2011 Winter X Games XV in Aspen, Colorado, behind Torstein Horgmo and Sebastien Toutant.

== Personal life ==
Kotsenburg was born in Coeur d'Alene, Idaho, but grew up in Park City, Utah. His parents are Carol Ann and Steve Kotsenburg, a real estate agent. He has two older brothers, and a younger sister. Kotsenburg started snowboarding at the age of five with older brother Blaze. The three younger siblings snowboard together. Their mother acts as Kotsenburg's travel agent.

Kotsenburg was homeschooled via the Alpha Omega Academy. He graduated in 2011. He has been a plant-based vegan since 2016.

== Career ==
Kotsenburg made his US Open debut at the age of 12. At age 16, he won the slopestyle silver at the European X Games 2010.

He landed the first-ever Cab double cork 1440 at Air & Style in Innsbruck in February 2011, took third at the 2011 Arctic Challenge, and was named to the U.S. Snowboarding Slopestyle Pro Team in December 2011.

He won the Winter X Games XVI Slopestyle silver in 2012.

Kotsenburg won slopestyle gold at the 2014 Sochi Olympics, nailing one trick he had never tried before and performing an original grab he invented, the "Holy Crail". He was the first gold medalist of the Olympic Games as well as the first medal for the United States. Soon after his success at the 2014 Olympics, he elected to leave competitive snowboarding in favor of exploring backcountry snowboarding.

During the summer, Kotsenburg trains on Mt. Hood at High Cascade Snowboard Camp. For summer 2014, Kotsenburg and his Lick the Cat crew have been awarded a Signature Session.
