= Eero Ettala =

Finnish snowboarder (born 1984)

Eero Anselm Ettala (born 17 October 1984) is a Finnish professional snowboarder. Since 2016, Ettala has also worked as a TV host in Finland.

== Career ==
In 2010 Ettala won the slopestyle gold medal in X Games XIV. In the Toyota Big Air competition he won 1st place in 2005 and 2009, 2nd place in 2004, 2006, and 2010.

Ettala was one of the snowboarding stars featured in the 2014 film, Snowboarding: For me. He is the focus of a 2016 documentary, Ender.

== As a TV host ==
In 2016 Ettala joined Finnish TV channel MTV as host for show Ota rahat ja juokse. In 2018 he started to host Suomen surkein kuski for the same channel.
