= Caleb Moore =

American snowmobile racer

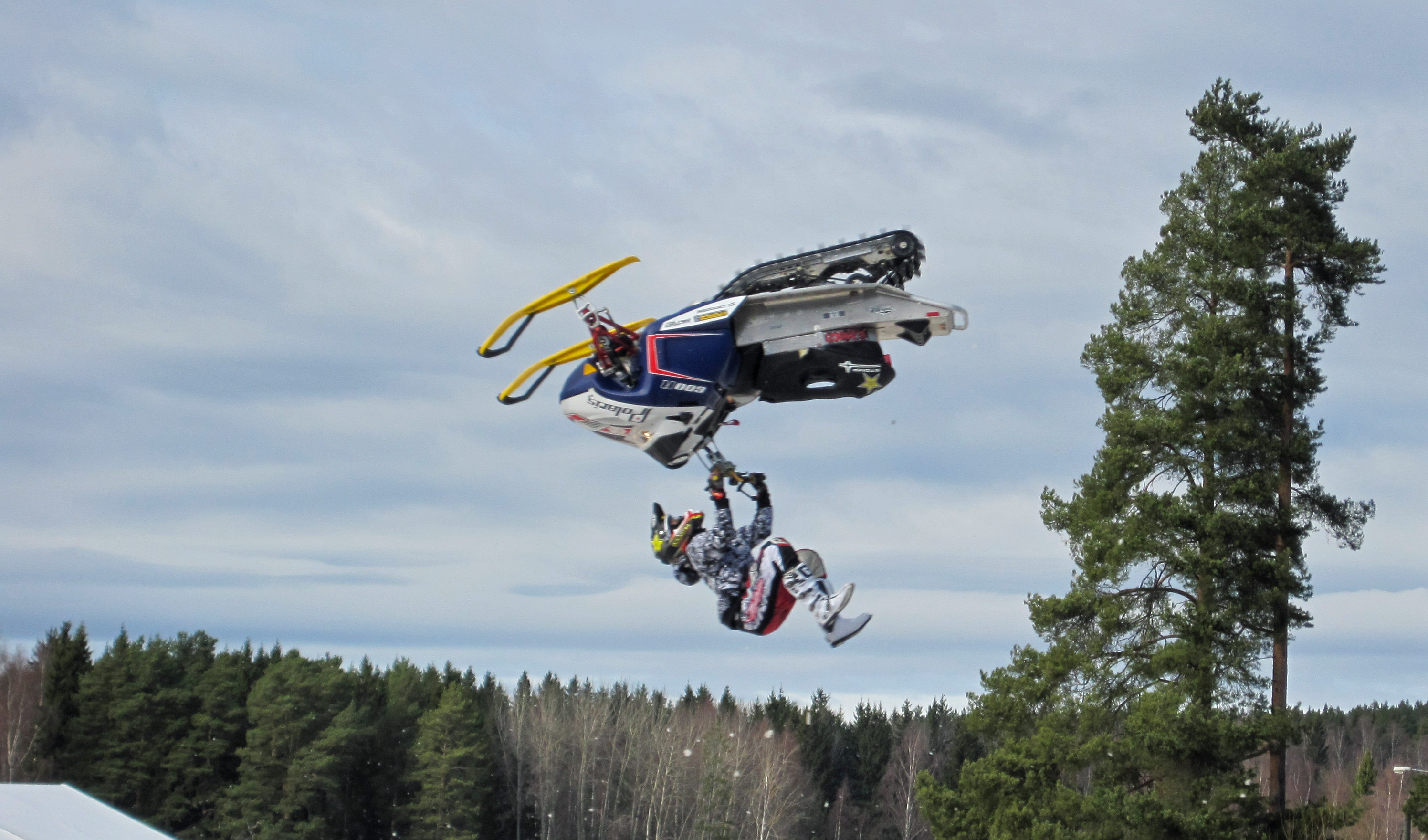
- Moore performing in Falun in 2012

Personal information
- Born: August 28, 1987 Wheeler, Texas, United States
- Died: January 31, 2013 (aged 25) Grand Junction, Colorado, United States
- Height: 5 ft 10 in (1.78 m)
- Weight: 160 lb (73 kg)

Sport
- Country: United States
- Sport: Snowmobile Quad Freestyle
Medal record
Men's snowmobile
Snowmobile at the Winter X Games
Silver medal – second place	2011 Aspen	Best Trick
Bronze medal – third place	2010 Aspen	Freestyle
Bronze medal – third place	2011 Aspen	Freestyle
Bronze medal – third place	2012 Aspen	Freestyle

Caleb Moore (August 28, 1987 – January 31, 2013) was an American professional snowmobile racer, a quad freestyle motocross rider, and the only person to die as a result of injuries sustained during the X Games. During his X Games career, Moore claimed four medals.

His younger brother Colten Moore is also a competitive snowmobiler and quad freestyle motocross rider.

== Personal life ==
Caleb Moore was born in 1987 in Ft. Worth, Texas. His parents are Wade and Michele Moore. Caleb is described as having been an adrenaline junkie, someone who was not afraid to take risks, and someone that truly loved what he did. He was family oriented, outgoing, personable, and made friends everywhere he went. He graduated from high school early so that he could continue ATV racing on the national circuit. The number 31 was his personal riding number that he chose for himself as a kid when he first got into ATV racing.

== Career ==
Caleb Moore began his career as an ATV racer. During an event in Minnesota, B. C. Vaught spotted Moore and signed him up to star in some action sports movies. Vaught eventually became Caleb's agent.

Caleb appeared in several Huevos freestyle movies by H-Bomb Films, he also toured with the Crusty Demons of the Dirt tour, as well as performed in XKnights FMX shows. He traveled around the world performing freestyle motocross tricks on his quad and was one of the very few people in the world who could consistently backflip a quad.

When Caleb decided to switch from ATV's to snowmobiles, he asked his mom and dad to back him as he learned how to do a backflip. Caleb mastered the maneuver in two weeks. Despite being raised in Krum, Texas, Moore practiced by landing his sled in a foam pit built by his father.

Moore's first professional competition as a freestyle snowmobile racer was at the 2010 Winter X Games in Aspen, Colorado. With just one month of practice, Caleb earned a bronze medal in the Freestyle division, while finishing sixth in Best Trick.

The next year, Moore earned bronze (Freestyle) and silver (Best Trick) at the 2011 Winter X Games. In 2012, Caleb repeated the bronze at the Winter X Games Freestyle Snowmobile, while his brother, Colten, took the gold. His performance led ESPN to write on his profile that he had "gone from beginner's luck to serious threat".

=== Injury and death ===
Moore was injured on January 24, 2013, during the Snowmobile Freestyle part of Winter X Games XVII, which was held in Aspen, Colorado. He was attempting a backflip (a trick he had done several times before) when the skis on his snowmobile snagged the ground as he was about to land. As a result, Moore was flipped over the handlebars and upon landing, was hit by the snowmobile. His brother Colten was also injured on the same day, sustaining a separated pelvis.

Moore was able to leave the scene under his own strength and he was taken to Aspen Valley Hospital to be treated for concussion. Doctors there discovered bleeding around the heart, and he was diagnosed with a heart contusion. He was airlifted to St. Mary's Hospital in Grand Junction, Colorado, to undergo heart surgery. While he was being transported, Moore suffered a period of cardiopulmonary arrest due to presumed unrelieved pericardial tamponade. The lack of oxygen to his brain during this time of hypotension caused anoxic encephalopathy. The fact that a brain complication had occurred was announced by a family spokesman in the days after the accident. Moore remained unconscious after arrival at St. Mary's Hospital, and his condition did not improve over the next several days. He was pronounced dead at 9:30 AM on January 31. His family invited the public to observe a moment of silence on February 7, 2013, one week after his death. ESPN presented Moore's family with an X-Games gold medal at his funeral to go along with the medals that he had previously won.

Friends, family, and fans of Moore continue his legacy and show support for him and his family by using the hashtags #RideforCaleb and #31Style on their posts in social media as well as put "In Memory of Caleb Moore" decals on their ATVs, dirt bikes, snowmobiles, or personal vehicles.

Moore's younger brother Colten Moore and author Keith O'Brien wrote a book called Catching the Sky which was released January 19, 2016. The book talks about Moore's life, the road to X-Games, and ultimately his death. It gives insight into the world of extreme sports and was at one time listed as the number one best selling book in the extreme sports category on Amazon.
