= Bad Things (band) =

American electronic rock band

- Origin: Los Angeles, California, United States
- Genres: Indie pop, alternative rock, pop, indie rock, electronic rock
- Years active: 2012–present
- Label: Warner Bros.
- Members: Jared Palomar; Anthony Sanudo; Shaun White; Lena Zawaideh (former); Dee Dee (Davis) LeDuke (former)
- Website: badthings.net

Bad Things is an American electronic rock band originally composed of former singer Dee Dee (Davis) LeDuke, bassist and former Augustana member Jared Palomar, guitarist Anthony Sanudo, former drummer-vocalist Lena Zawaideh, and guitarist (Olympic medallist) Shaun White. Bad Things signed to Warner Bros. Records in the summer of 2013. Their LP, produced by Rob Schnapf (Beck, Elliott Smith), features the lead single "Anybody" released on August 13, 2013. Bad Things' self-titled debut album was released on January 21, 2014, via Warner Bros. Records.

== Music career ==
Bad Things originally consisted of front man/lead singer Dee Dee (Davis) LeDuke (not currently in the band), bass player Jared Palomar, guitarist Anthony Sanudo, drummer Lena Zawaideh (not currently in the band) and lead guitarist Shaun White, the professional snowboarder and skateboarder. Shaun, Lena and Anthony grew up in North County San Diego, CA and have been friends for years. Jared and Davis joined this past year, and together, the band wrote a collection of songs for their debut, produced by Rob Schnapf (Beck, Elliott Smith, The Vines).

The first offering from the album was "Caught Inside," which streamed on the band's SoundCloud. Bad Things played two shows in NYC - Popshop July 11 at Santo's Party House and Brooklyn Bowl on July 13 - followed by a Northeast and Midwest headlining run during a tour in the summer of 2013.

== 2013—present: Early tours ==
Bad Things played their first New York City show on July 11, 2013, at Santo’s Party House, sharing the bill with X Ambassadors and We Are Scientists. This show also kicked off their first headlining tour which concluded on August 9 in Minneapolis. Bad Things was chosen to replace Death Grips's set as one of the four headlining Saturday night slots at Lollapalooza in August 2013.

The band released the digital single "Anybody" on August 13, 2013. The band's self-titled debut album was released on January 21, 2014. The album includes twelve tracks with two iTunes exclusive bonus tracks.

In 2014 Bad Things also released a new song, "Ditty", as well as acoustic versions of "End of the Road" and "Anybody"; all three were available to download for free, for anyone who 'liked' the band on Facebook or 'followed' them on Twitter and Instagram.

On April 29, 2015 Dee Dee LeDuke announced that she had parted ways from the band on her Instagram account, writing "I love those guys and always will but its time from a brand new chapter for both of us. I would like to thank everyone who came along for the crazy ride that was "bad things" you are all such a huge part of my life and will forever be loyal to you...".

In 2016, former Bad Things drummer Lena Zawaideh filed a lawsuit against Shaun White, claiming sexual harassment and breach of contract. White and Zawaideh reached an out-of-court settlement in May 2017; the terms of the settlement were not disclosed and the court case dismissed.

== Tours ==
- New York City tour (2013)
- Lollapalooza (2013)
- Firefly Festival (2014)

== Discography ==
- Bad Things (2014)
