= Todd Schlopy =

American football player and cameraman (born 1961)

Robert Todd Schlopy
No. 3
- Position: Placekicker

Personal information
- Born: June 17, 1961 (age 65); Bradford, Pennsylvania, U.S.
- Listed height: 5 ft 10 in (1.78 m)
- Listed weight: 165 lb (75 kg)

Career information
- High school: Orchard Park (NY)
- College: Michigan
- NFL draft: 1985: undrafted

Career history
- Buffalo Bills (1985)*; Seattle Seahawks (1986)*; Buffalo Bills (1987)
- * Offseason or practice squad member only

Career NFL statistics
- Field goals made: 2
- Field goal attempts: 5
- Field goal %: 40
- Longest field goal: 31
- Stats at Pro Football Reference

Robert Todd Schlopy (born June 17, 1961) is a motion picture cameraman and former American football placekicker.

== Early life ==
Born in Bradford, Pennsylvania and raised in Buffalo, NY, Schlopy attended Orchard Park High School in Orchard Park, New York.

== Football career ==
=== College career ===
Schlopy played college football for the Michigan Wolverines from 1981 to 1984 where he was a two-time Academic All-Big Ten placekicker.

=== Professional career ===
As a Western New York native, Schlopy, a barefoot placekicker, signed a contract with the Buffalo Bills in 1985. In 1986 he signed with the Seattle Seahawks where he had an outstanding pre-season but failed to unseat incumbent Norm Johnson. A highly sought-after free agent, Schlopy again signed with Buffalo in 1987 feeling that was his best opportunity to win a job. The Bills were under new head coach Marv Levy and new quarterback Jim Kelly. After a spectacular pre-season, Schlopy did not get the opportunity to attempt any field goals in the regular season and was released. He was called upon several weeks later during the 1987 NFL Players Strike to fill in as placekicker for the Buffalo Bills, while Scott Norwood took part in the strike. Schlopy attempted no field goals in his first two games, made one extra point and another extra point blocked. Schlopy played a crucial role in the Bills' win against the New York Giants, kicking two field goals for a 6–3 victory, the second coming with 19 seconds remaining in overtime. In doing so Schlopy became one of 3 barefoot kickers in NFL history to win a regular season game in overtime. Schlopy's professional football career ended after that game when the strike ended and Norwood returned.

== Film career ==
Schlopy became a cameraman on feature films beginning in 1989. He joined the IASTE local 600 Camera Guild in 1996.[3] His credits include Revenant (first assistant camera, 2015), Iron Man 3 (first assistant camera second unit, 2013), Transformers (first assistant camera, 2007), Air Force One (first assistant camera, 1997), Seabiscuit (first assistant camera, 2003), Academy award winning Crash (first assistant camera, 2004), Swordfish (first assistant camera, 2001), Bad Times at the El Royale (first assistant camera, 2018), A Bad Moms Christmas (first assistant camera, 2017) Ride Along and Ride Along 2, (first assistant camera 2014 and 2016), Primary Colors (first assistant Steadicam 1998) Starship Troopers (first assistant Steadicam, 1997), Wanted (first assistant camera, 2008), The Rookie (first assistant camera, 2002) Red Dawn (first assistant camera, 2011), Jonah Hex (first assistant camera, 2010), High School (first assistant camera, 2010), G.I. Joe: The Rise of Cobra (first assistant camera, 2009), Hannah Montana & Miley Cyrus: Best of Both Worlds Concert (first assistant camera, 2008), Herbie: Fully Loaded (first assistant camera, 2005), Shallow Hal (first assistant camera, 2001), and Ski Patrol (second assistant camera, 1990) .[4]

== Personal life ==
His son, Alex Schlopy, is a freeskier who won a gold medal at the 2011 Winter X Games in the big air contest. His cousin, Erik Schlopy, is a former alpine skier who competed at three editions of the Olympics; through Erik, the Schlopys are related by marriage to swimmer and media personality Summer Sanders.
