= Shaun White =

American snowboarder and skateboarder (born 1986)

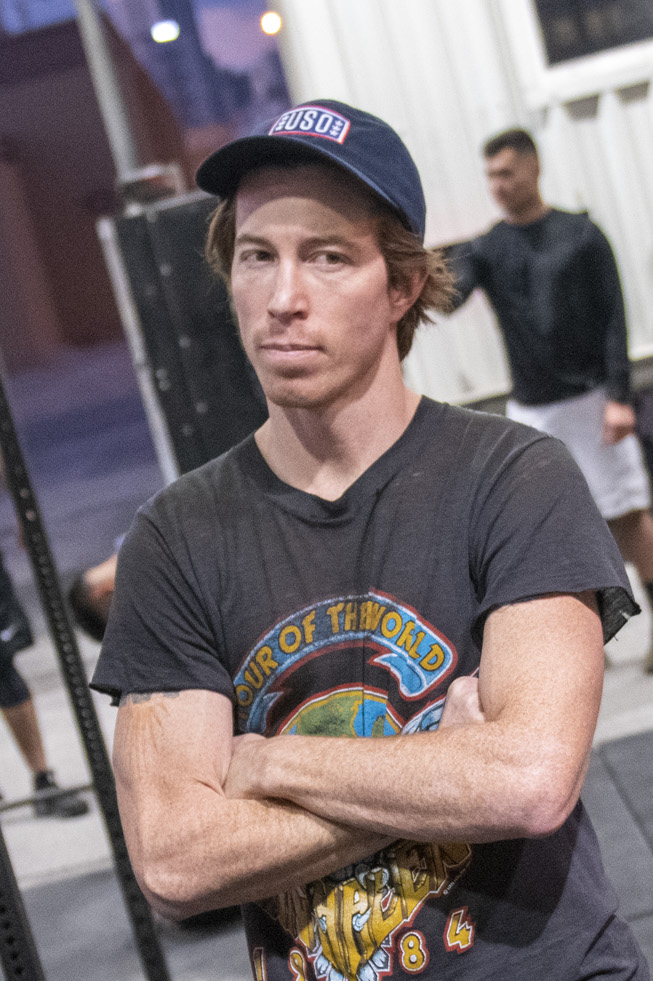
- White in 2018

Personal information
- Full name: Shaun Roger White
- Born: September 3, 1986 (age 40) San Diego, California, U.S.
- Height: 5 ft 8 in (173 cm)
- Weight: 154 lb (70 kg)

Sport
- Country: United States
- Sport: Snowboarding, skateboarding
Medal record
Men's snowboarding
Representing the United States
Olympic Games
| Gold medal – first place | 2006 Torino | Halfpipe |
| Gold medal – first place | 2010 Vancouver | Halfpipe |
| Gold medal – first place | 2018 Pyeongchang | Halfpipe |
Winter X Games
| Gold medal – first place | 2003 Aspen | Superpipe |
| Gold medal – first place | 2003 Aspen | Slopestyle |
| Gold medal – first place | 2004 Aspen | Slopestyle |
| Gold medal – first place | 2005 Aspen | Slopestyle |
| Gold medal – first place | 2006 Aspen | Superpipe |
| Gold medal – first place | 2006 Aspen | Slopestyle |
| Gold medal – first place | 2008 Aspen | Superpipe |
| Gold medal – first place | 2009 Aspen | Superpipe |
| Gold medal – first place | 2009 Aspen | Slopestyle |
| Gold medal – first place | 2010 Aspen | Superpipe |
| Gold medal – first place | 2011 Aspen | Superpipe |
| Gold medal – first place | 2012 Aspen | Superpipe |
| Gold medal – first place | 2013 Aspen | Superpipe |
| Silver medal – second place | 2002 Aspen | Superpipe |
| Silver medal – second place | 2002 Aspen | Slopestyle |
| Silver medal – second place | 2007 Aspen | Superpipe |
| Bronze medal – third place | 2007 Aspen | Slopestyle |
| Bronze medal – third place | 2008 Aspen | Slopestyle |
Men's skateboarding
X Games
| Gold medal – first place | 2007 Los Angeles | Vert |
| Gold medal – first place | 2011 Los Angeles | Vert |
| Silver medal – second place | 2005 Los Angeles | Vert |
| Silver medal – second place | 2010 Los Angeles | Vert |
| Bronze medal – third place | 2008 Los Angeles | Vert |

Shaun Roger White (born September 3, 1986) is an American former professional snowboarder and skateboarder. He is a five-time Olympian and a three-time Olympic gold medalist in half-pipe snowboarding. He holds the world record for the most X Games gold medals and most Olympic gold medals by a snowboarder. He has also won ten ESPY Awards throughout his career in various categories.

Outside of his Olympic and skateboarding career White plays guitar in the band the Bad Things and started his own snowboarding league "The Snow League" in 2025.

== Early life ==
White was born in San Diego, California, to parents Cathy and Roger. When he was young his mother was a waitress and his father, who grew up surfing, worked for the San Clemente, California, water department. He is the youngest of four children. His ancestry includes Irish and Italian. He was born with a tetralogy of Fallot, a congenital heart defect for which he required two open-heart operations before the age of one. White spent his early years riding the San Bernardino Mountains of Southern California with his family. They would stay in a van in resort parking lots.

== Athletic career ==
=== Skateboarding ===
At an early age White's skills as a skateboarder drew admirers. Professional skateboarder Tony Hawk befriended the nine-year-old White at the Encinitas, California, YMCA skate park and mentored him, helping White turn pro in skateboarding at the age of 16. White has said that "Tony was my hero and I was too terrified to talk to him so every time I saw him at the skate park I would try to impress him with my skateboarding in the hopes that one day he would say something to me." White has won many titles on his skateboard, including the overall title of Action Sports Tour Champion, and was the first person to compete in and win both the Summer and Winter X Games in two different sports.

=== Snowboarding ===
Following in his older brother Jesse White's footsteps, White switched from skiing to snowboarding at age six, and by age seven, he received his first sponsorship. White has participated in five Winter Olympics in his career. At the 2006, 2010, and 2018 Winter Olympics, White won gold in the snowboard halfpipe event. White has also participated in the Winter X Games, where he has won a medal every year since 2002. Including all winter X Games competitions through 2013, White amassed 18 medals—13 gold, 3 silver, and 2 bronze—highlighted by becoming the first male athlete to achieve a quadruple win streak in a single discipline, specifically in snowboard slopestyle. White's streak was snapped in 2007 when he lost to Andreas Wiig and Teddy Flandreau, with White taking the bronze. He won the Air & Style Contest in 2003 and 2004.

==== 2006 Winter Olympics ====
At the 2006 Winter Olympics, White won gold in the half-pipe. After his first run in qualifications, White was almost out of competition, scoring only 37.7. On his second run, he recorded a score of 45.3. In the finals, White recorded a score of 46.8 (50 is the highest possible score) to win. Fellow American Danny Kass won the silver with a points total of 44.0.

==== 2008 ====
Executing a near-flawless second run, White captured his third consecutive snowboard halfpipe title at the 2008 U.S. Open Snowboarding Championships to go along with his third US Open slopestyle competition. This followed White's win at the 25th (2007) Burton US Open, where he placed third in slopestlyle and first in the halfpipe. At the 2007 Open, White was also crowned the first "Burton Global Open Champion". His take for the event was $100,000 (Global Open Champ), $20,000 (1st Place Halfpipe), $90,000 (3rd Place Slopestyle), and a new Corvette.

==== 2009 ====
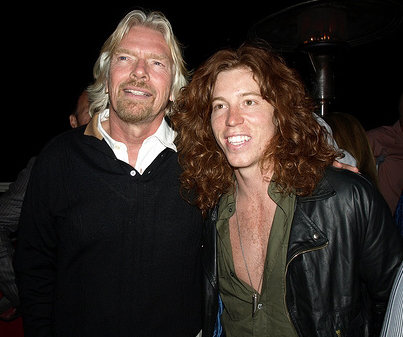
White with Richard Branson in 2009

Controversy followed White's win on the 2009 SuperPipe at Winter X Games XIII. Kevin Pearce had five hits in the pipe, and all were the same tricks White did in his final run. White, on the other hand, had six hits and he started off his run with a big backside rodeo 540 where Pearce started his run off with a big grab. Although Pearce went bigger, he had fewer hits, and his first hit wasn't as technically difficult as White's first hit. Judges came to the conclusion that White deserved the better score because he started off with a more technical trick and he had one more hit than Pearce. With the win, White became the second competitor, after Tanner Hall, to win a gold medal in the SuperPipe in consecutive years at the Winter X Games. He also won a gold medal in Slopestyle, finally winning gold after two consecutive years of bronze.

On February 14, 2009, White won the FIS World Cup Men's Halfpipe event at Vancouver's Cypress Mountain. Out of the gate in his first qualifying run, he qualified immediately with the day's best score of 45.5. With a thumb sprained on an over-rotated backside 1080 in the second qualifying run, White clinched the event with the first of his two runs in the finals. His first finals run was awarded the highest score ever in FIS halfpipe, a 47.3.

==== 2010 Winter Olympics ====
At the 2010 Winter Olympics in Vancouver, White again won gold in the halfpipe. In the finals, White recorded a score of 46.8 on his first run, which proved a high enough score to secure the gold medal without a second run. He performed his second run anyway, as a victory lap, ending his run with a well-anticipated Double McTwist 1260 which he named The Tomahawk. This second run resulted in a record score of 48.4 (50 is the highest possible score) enlarging his margin of victory. His nearest competitor won the silver with a points total of 45.0 – 3.4 behind White.

==== 2011 ====
After a sub-par performance in the Slopestyle and failing to reach the finals, White "redeemed" himself in the SuperPipe. With an 89, he sat in second place going into his 2nd of three runs. He completed the run, landing his infamous Double McTwist 1260 and finishing with a score of 97.33 to take the lead and claim the historical 4th straight Gold in the Winter X Games, held in Aspen, Colorado. The score tied an X Games record, which was set by White one year before. His 3rd run was a simple victory run featuring mostly straight air.

==== 2012 ====
At Winter X, White became the first person in the history of the Winter X Games to score a perfect 100 in the men's Snowboard SuperPipe.

==== 2013 ====
White won his 6th consecutive SuperPipe victory, making him the second participant ever to achieve this, with SnoCross racer Tucker Hibbert achieving his 6th consecutive victory earlier in the same day.

In December 2013, he won the third place in the Pipe & Slope contest at the FIS Snowboard World Cup in Copper Mountain, Colorado.

==== 2014 Winter Olympics ====
White finished fourth at the 2014 Winter Olympics in the Halfpipe event.

During the winter games, he was the most talked-about Olympic athlete on Facebook.

==== 2018 Winter Olympics ====
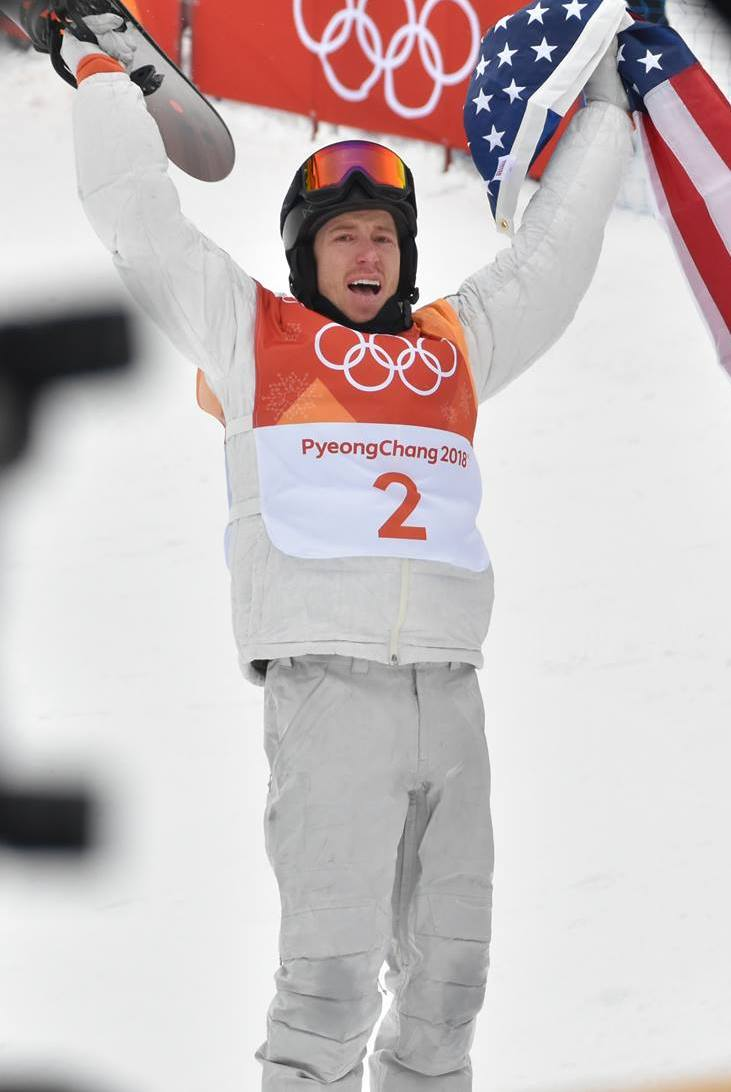
White after medalling at the 2018 Winter Olympics

While in New Zealand, training for the 2018 Winter Olympics, White crashed into the edge of a superpipe; the resulting injuries to his face required 62 stitches. Despite the accident, White qualified for the 2018 US Olympic Team. On February 14, he won his third Olympic gold medal for the Men's Halfpipe event with a score of 97.75, with Ayumu Hirano of Japan taking the silver medal and Scott James of Australia taking the bronze. White was trailing Hirano by one full point coming into his last run with a score of 94.25. Despite this, White dramatically won the gold medal with back-to-back 1440s. His gold medal was also the 100th for the United States at the Winter Olympic Games.

==== 2022 Winter Olympics ====
White finished fourth at the 2022 Winter Olympics in the halfpipe.

During the winter games, White announced it would be the last Olympics in which he would compete. Later, he announced it would be his final competition altogether. He received a standing ovation from the crowd during his final run.

=== Endorsements ===
White has had a sponsor since he was seven years old. White signed CAA Sports for representation after working with IMG for eight years. Corporate endorsement deals include or have included Burton Snowboards, Oakley, Inc., Birdhouse Skateboards, Park City Mountain Resort, Target Corporation, Red Bull, Ubisoft, Adio, Hewlett-Packard, and American Express. He is also a brand ambassador for Krave Jerky and as part of their partnership he has developed and released his own flavors. In 2009, Forbes magazine estimated that he had earned $9 million from his endorsements in 2008.

== Media ventures ==
=== Print ===
White had his first published interview in TransWorld SNOWboarding Magazine in 2003.

White was one of the few pro snowboarders to be a guest editor of Snowboarder Magazine (February 2008 issue).

=== Acting ===
White starred in the 2004 documentary The White Album and the 2005 snowboarding documentary First Descent.

In 2007, White appeared on the E! reality TV show The Girls Next Door as a snowboarding teacher for Holly Madison, Bridget Marquardt and Kendra Wilkinson.

A film, Don't Look Down, was released on DVD and ESPN in 2009. The film tracks his journey through the year following his Olympic success.

White appeared on the January 16, 2011, episode of Extreme Makeover: Home Edition to help redesign a room for an eight-year-old boy.

White has made cameo appearances as himself in the 2011 film Friends with Benefits, the 2013 episode "Da Flippity Flop" of the animated TV series American Dad!, and the 2014 Disney Channel Original Movie Cloud 9.

White appeared in the Nickelodeon TV series Henry Danger in 2018 in the episode "Toon in for Danger". In the episode White and Captain Man were struggling for a seat while watching the premiere of The Adventures of Kid Danger.

=== Music ===
White plays guitar in the electronic rock band Bad Things. He got his first guitar as first prize in a snowboarding competition. The band played in one of the four Saturday headlining slots at the 2013 Lollapalooza festival, as a last-minute replacement for Death Grips.

In October 2013, White appeared in the music video for "City of Angels" by Thirty Seconds to Mars.

=== Video games ===
White has appeared in several video games and has also launched his video game franchise. He appeared in 1999's Cool Boarders 4 and 2001's Shaun Palmer's Pro Snowboarder. In 2008 he released his own video game, Shaun White Snowboarding. This was followed by a sequel, Shaun White Snowboarding: World Stage, released in 2009. A skateboarding game, Shaun White Skateboarding, was also released in 2010.

== Business ventures ==
After the 2010 Winter Olympics, White created Shaun White Enterprises to consolidate his business deals. In early 2016, White purchased a minority stake in Mammoth Resorts and is now a part-owner of the Mammoth Mountain, Snow Summit, June Mountain, and Bear Mountain ski areas where he got his start in snowboarding. White took ownership of the Air + Style festival of music and snowboarding in 2014 and moved it from Austria to Los Angeles.

White launched his own active lifestyle brand named 'Whitespace' in January 2022; he announced the name of the brand on his social media. The company will eventually release a line of outerwear, snowboard hard-goods, athletic equipment, and streetwear apparel.

=== The Snow League ===
In 2024, White announced he would be starting his own snowboarding league called "The Snow League". He created the league in attempt to make snowboarding like other major sports stating "I want to make it so you can have a decent season on the tour and make a great living, that's the goal," In traditional sports, it's like, you start as an amateur, then you play high school, and then go to college and get into the pros. For this, I want the same." The first event took place on March 7, 2025 in Aspen, Colorado.

In November 2024, The Snow League signed a multiyear media rights deal with NBC and Peacock. The Snow League CEO Omer Atesman said that it had plans for international broadcast deals as well. The Snow League had an initial $4.5 million in seed funding. $30 million additional funding was added by November 12, 2025.

== Personal life ==
White has had the longstanding nickname "The Flying Tomato", due to his red hair. In 2006, Rolling Stone wrote about the nickname, saying, "he used to embrace it, even wearing headbands with a flying-tomato logo, but he has grown tired of it." He has also been nicknamed "Animal", a reference to a character from The Muppet Show.

On September 17, 2012, White was arrested near a hotel in Nashville for public intoxication and vandalism after attending the wedding party of the drummer of the Black Keys, Patrick Carney.

White, who underwent two open-heart surgeries as an infant, has granted 17 wishes through the Make-A-Wish Foundation since 2008.

Since retirement he has taken up surfing.

=== Relationships ===
White was in a relationship with Sarah Barthel of the band Phantogram from 2013 to 2019.

He started dating actress Nina Dobrev in 2020. The two became engaged on October 30, 2024. In September 2025, it was reported that they had ended their engagement and separated.

=== Sexual harassment allegation ===
In 2016, Bad Things drummer Lena Zawaideh brought a lawsuit against White, claiming sexual harassment and breach of contract. White and Zawaideh reached an out-of-court settlement in May 2017; the terms of the settlement were not disclosed. At a press conference following White's win at the 2018 Winter Olympics, he was asked if he was concerned that the lawsuit and settlement would tarnish his image. In replying, he referred to the incident as gossip, a response that created widespread condemnation of White for minimizing sexual harassment. White later apologized for his choice of words.

== Honors and awards ==
- Best Action Sports Athlete Espy Award: 2003
- Best U.S. Olympian ESPY Award: 2006
- Outstanding/Best Male Action Sports Athlete ESPY Award: 2006, 2008, 2009, 2010, 2012
- Best US Male Olympian ESPY Award: 2010, 2018
- NSAA Industry Impact Award for athletic achievements and the tremendous exposure brought to the sport of snowboarding: 2011
- Featured on the cover of Forbes magazine's "30 under 30" issue in 2016
- Laureus World Sports Awards – Action Sportsperson of the Year (2008)
- Revolver Golden Gods Awards Most Metal Athlete (2009)
- ANOC Gala Awards 2018：Best Male Athlete of PyeongChang 2018
- USOC SportsMan of the Year: 2018
- Best Olympic Moment ESPY Award: 2018
- Inducted into the California Outdoor Sports Hall of Fame in 2021
- In 2024 he was named to ESPNs list of the top 100 athletes since 2000

== See also ==
- List of athletes with the most appearances at Olympic Games
- List of Olympic medalists in snowboarding
- List of multi-sport athletes
- List of multiple Olympic gold medalists
- List of multiple Olympic gold medalists in one event
