= Elena Hight =

American snowboarder

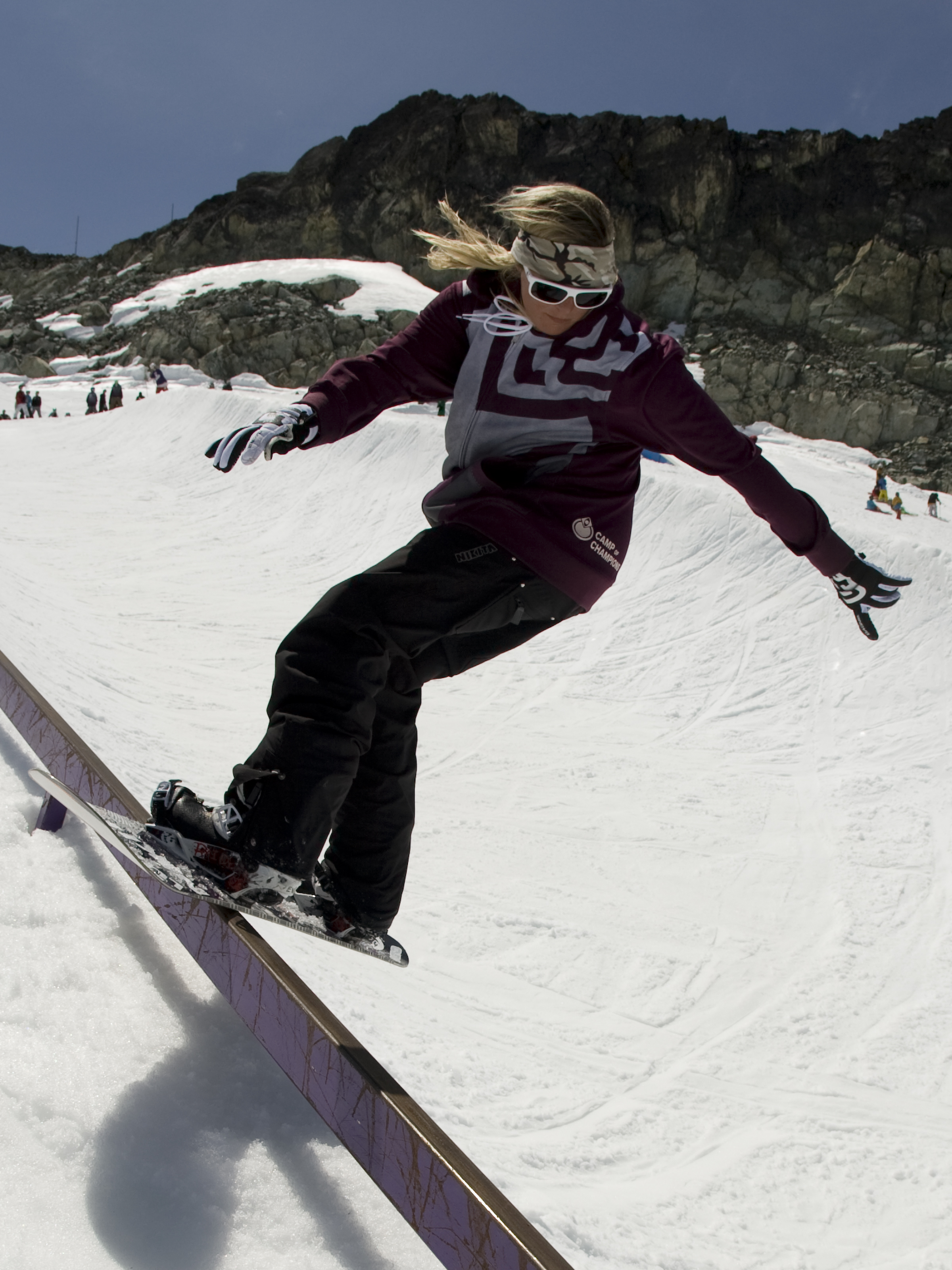
- Hight in 2009

Personal information
- Born: August 17, 1989 (age 37) Kauaʻi, Hawaii, U.S.
- Home town: South Lake Tahoe, California, U.S.
- Height: 5 ft 1 in (1.55 m) (2010)
- Weight: 115 lb (52 kg) (2010)

Sport
- Country: United States
- Sport: snowboarding
- Event: halfpipe
- Turned pro: 2002

Achievements and titles
- Olympic finals: 2006 Winter Olympics 6th ladies' halfpipe 2010 Winter Olympics 10th ladies' halfpipe
Medal record
Women's Snowboarding
Representing the United States
Winter Dew Tour
Bronze medal – third place	2008–2009 Dew Cup	SuperPipe
Bronze medal – third place	2009 Mt. Snow	SuperPipe
Bronze medal – third place	2008 Breckenridge	SuperPipe
Winter X Games
Gold medal – first place	2017 Aspen	SuperPipe
Silver medal – second place	2012 Aspen	SuperPipe
Silver medal – second place	2013 Aspen	SuperPipe
Bronze medal – third place	2007 Aspen	SuperPipe
Bronze medal – third place	2011 Aspen	SuperPipe

Elena Hight (born August 17, 1989, in Kauaʻi) is an American Olympic snowboarder. She represented the United States at the 2006 and 2010 Winter Olympics as well as the Winter X Games where she won one gold, three silver and two bronze medals. During her career, she became the first snowboarder to land a double backside alley-oop rodeo.

== Early life ==
Elena Hight was born on August 17, 1989 in Kauaʻi, Hawaii, United States. After her family moved to California, she took up snowboarding aged six inspired by a trip to Bogus Basin, Idaho, United States with her father.

== Career ==
Hight made her Winter X Games debut aged 15 at the 2004 edition in Aspen, Colorado, United States. She finished sixth in the SBD SuperPipe. She made her Olympic debut at the 2006 Winter Olympics in Turin, Italy. She finished sixth in the women's halfpipe.

At Winter X Games X in Aspen in 2007, Hight won her first X Games medal after finishing third in the SBD SuperPipe. Hight competed at the 2010 Winter Olympics in Vancouver, British Columbia, Canada where she finished 10th in the women's halfpipe. The following year, Hight won bronze in the SBD SuperPipe at the Winter X Games XV in Aspen.

She won a silver medal in the SBD SuperPipe at the Winter X Games XVI in 2012 in Aspen. In May 2012, while training with the United States snowboard team in Mammoth, California, Hight became the first snowboarder to land a double backside alley-oop rodeo in a halfpipe.

On January 26, 2013, at Winter X Games XVII, Hight became the first snowboarder to land a double backside alley-oop rodeo during a halfpipe competition. The trick helped her to win a second consecutive silver medal in the SBD SuperPipe.

She won her only X Games gold medal at the Winter X Games XXI in Aspen in 2017 when she finished first SBD SuperPipe.
