= Halldór Helgason =

Icelandic snowboarder

Medal record

Men's snowboarding

Representing Iceland

Winter X Games
Gold medal – first place	2010 Aspen	Big air
Silver medal – second place	2023 Aspen	Knuckle Huck

Halldór Helgason (born 10 January 1991) is an Icelandic snowboarder. Halldór was born in Akureyri, Iceland. He is the younger brother of Eirikur "Eiki" Helgason. Halldór owns Lobster Snowboards, atrip apparel, 7/9/13 Belts, Switchback Bindings and Hoppipolla Headwear, alongside his brother Eiki. Halldor started Lobster snowboards with Kristoffer Hansson and the owners of Bataleon, after Halldor left his board sponsor, DC Shoes Co. In 2016 he founded another company atrip apparel in collaboration with Stigma Distribution.

Halldór is sponsored by Lobster snowboards, Monster Energy, Kaleidoscope Skateboards, Neff Gloves & Headwear, Switchback Bindings, Spotdigger, GoPro and VonZipper goggles and eyewear.

Halldor is often considered "The Definition of Steez", for his unique array tricks and how easily he pulls them off. His Iconic trick, the Lobster Flip, is a double rodeo 1260, That's 2 flips with 3.5 rotations. Many say he is the hardest pro snowboarder, because of his savage street edits. He is not afraid to "Send It" and beefs it a lot in the process. Helgason has also been asked to model for many major corporations but refused all of them. 'The day Halldór became a pro snowboarder the world lost an unimaginably glorious model – the feats he could have reached are inconceivable'.

Halldór won a gold in Big Air at the 2010 Winter X games, making him the first Icelander to win a medal at the contest. Halldór, Eiki, their filmer Johannes Brenning and their agent Kristoffer Hansson started the belts brand 7/9/13.

He starred in movies "They came from" by Factor Films, and "The Storming" by Standard Films. In the winter of 2011, he and his brother Eiki Helgason released a free online film called "Sexual Snowboarding". Halldor and Eiki followed up their release of "Sexual Snowboarding" with another raw and funny look into their lives in the movie "Pepping", released free online in the fall of 2012. Late in 2013, Nike released their anticipated film Never Not, which Halldor Helgason was a part of. In December 2014, the brothers dropped yet another heavy free video called "NOTOBO". Halldor "sent it" again, dropping a heavy part with much "steez" in every trick.

In 2013, during the finals of the X Games Snowboard Big Air competition in Aspen (CO), Hegalson crashed on an attempted triple backflip and got a concussion. He was taken to the hospital. In 2014 during the Big Air final qualifications he tried a triple barrel roll and he almost landed it.
