= Chas Guldemond =

American snowboarder (born 1987)

Personal information
- Full name: Charles Guldemond
- Born: April 22, 1987 (age 39) Laconia, New Hampshire, U.S.
- Height: 6 ft 1 in (185 cm)
- Weight: 181 lb (82 kg)

Sport
- Country: United States
- Sport: Snowboarding
Medal record
Men's snowboarding
Representing the United States
Winter X Games
Bronze medal – third place	2010 Aspen	SlopeStyle
Bronze medal – third place	2011 Aspen	Best Method

Charles "Chas" Guldemond (born April 22, 1987) is an American snowboarder.

== Personal life ==
Originally from Laconia, New Hampshire, Guldemond now resides in Truckee, California.

== Career ==
Guldemond competes on the TTR World Tour. In the 2007/2008 Swatch TTR World Snowboard Tour, Guldemond finished ranked World No.7. He has a sponsorship deal with DC Snowboards, His other sponsors include Rockstar Energy Drink, Electric, Under Armour, Hatch, Porters Tahoe, NEFF, Northstar, and Kicker.

== Competition highlights ==
Swatch TTR 2008/2009 Season

- 3rd – Slopestyle – 5Star Burton New Zealand Open (Ticket to Ride (World Snowboard Tour))
- 5th – Halfpipe – 5Star Burton Australian Open (Ticket to Ride (World Snowboard Tour))
- 3rd – Big Air – 6Star Nissan X-Trail Jam (Ticket to Ride (World Snowboard Tour))
- 4th – Slopestyle – 6Star O'Neill Evolution (Ticket to Ride (World Snowboard Tour))
- 4th – Slopestyle- 6Star Burton European Open (Ticket to Ride (World Snowboard Tour))
- 4th – Slopestyle – 5Star Burton Canadian Open (Ticket to Ride (World Snowboard Tour))
- 4th – Halfpipe – 5Star Burton Canadian Open (Ticket to Ride (World Snowboard Tour))
- 1st – Slopestyle – 5Star Nissan X-Trail Asian Open (Ticket to Ride (World Snowboard Tour))
- 1st – Halfpipe – 5Star Nissan X-Trail Asian Open (Ticket to Ride (World Snowboard Tour))
