= Jayson Hale =

American snowboarder (born 1985)

Personal information
- Born: June 26, 1985 (age 41) Sierraville, California, U.S.
- Website: www.jaysonhale.com

Sport
- Country: United States
- Sport: Snowboarding
- Event: Backcountry
- Team: U.S. Snowboarding
- Turned pro: 2003

Achievements and titles
- Olympic finals: 2006
Medal record
Men's snowboarding
Representing the United States
Winter X Games
| Bronze medal – third place | 2006 Aspen | Snowboard X |
| Bronze medal – third place | 2012 Aspen | Snowboard X |
World Championships
| Bronze medal – third place | 2005 | Snowboard X |
World Cup
| Bronze medal – third place | 2006 Kronplaz, Italy | Snowboard X |
Arctic Man Snowboard
| Gold medal – first place | 2011 Summit, Alaska | Snowmobile/Snowboarding Team Race |
| Silver medal – second place | 2012 Summit, Alaska | Snowmobile/Snowboarding Team Race |
| Silver medal – second place | 2013 Summit, Alaska | Snowmobile/Snowboarding Team Race |
World FreeRide Championships
| Bronze medal – third place | 2013 Thompson Pass, Alaska | Backcountry |

Jayson Hale (born June 26, 1985) is an American snowboarder.

== Athletic career ==
He is a two-time Winter X Games bronze medalist (2006, 2012) in snowboard cross. Hale has been a member of the American snowboarding team since (2003) when snowboard cross was officially made an Olympic sport. He was the youngest contender in the sport for some time and is joined by only Seth Wescott and Nate Holland as the remaining original U.S. SBX team members.

In addition to his achievements in both the FIS World Cup Circuit and the Winter X Games, Hale is an Olympic Athlete who joined the US Olympic team in 2006 in Turin, Italy. In 2013 Hale started to compete in Backcountry Snowboarding. He placed 3rd in the World FreeRide Championship his first time entering.
