= Steve Fisher (snowboarder) =

American snowboarder (born 1982)

Personal information
- Nickname: The Fish
- Born: September 21, 1982 (age 43) Olathe, Kansas, U.S.

Sport
- Country: United States
- Sport: Snowboarding
- Turned pro: 2002
Medal record
Representing the United States
Men's Snowboarding
FIS Snowboarding World Championships
Bronze medal – third place	2003 Kreischberg	Halfpipe
Winter Dew Tour
Silver medal – second place	2008-2009 Dew Cup	Superpipe
Silver medal – second place	2009 Northstar-at-Tahoe	Superpipe
Winter X Games
Gold medal – first place	2007 Aspen	Superpipe

Steve Fisher (born September 21, 1982), also known as "the Fish", is an American professional snowboarder and the 2004 and 2007 Winter X Games Champion. He was once ranked the #1 halfpipe rider in the United States by the USSA ranking system.

== Childhood and early snowboarding career ==
Fisher was born in Olathe, Kansas. He grew up in Saint Louis Park, a suburb out of Minneapolis. As a young boy, his home mountain was Buck Hill which was home to one of the first halfpipes in the Midwest. He rode at Buck hill every day and night until he was ten years old, saying that he rarely spent any time at home during the winter. He began competing in local competitions at age eight and qualified for USASA nationals by age nine. Fisher went pro in 2002 when he was asked by the US Snowboarding Team to forerun the 2002 Olympic halfpipe event and become a part of US Snowboarding.

== Riding style ==
Fisher rides regular stance, with eighteen and negative six degrees on his board. His riding style includes technical backside 540s, which he demonstrates in Transworld Snowboarding's 20 Tricks II video. In addition to the halfpipe, Steve rides rails, jumps, and natural backcountry features.

== Career highlights ==
Year	Event	Location	Position
2007	Winter X Games XI	Aspen, CO	Superpipe Gold Medal (beating out Shaun White) and overall champion
2007	Mt. Bachelor Grand Prix	Bend, OR	1st Place
2007	Paul Mitchell Progression Session	Breckenridge, CO	1st Place (quarterpipe)
2006	Mountain Creek Grand Prix	Vernon, NJ	3rd Place
2005	Burton US Open	Stratton, VT	2nd Place
2004	Burton US Open	Stratton, VT	2nd Place
2004	Oakley Arctic Challenge	Oslo, Norway	2nd Place
2004	Vans Triple Crown	Northstar at Tahoe, CA	1st Place
2004	Winter X Games	Aspen, CO	Halfpipe Champion
2003	Vans Triple Crown	Big Bear, CA	1st Place
2003	Snowboarding World Championships	Kreischberg, Austria	3rd Place
2002	Snowboarding World Championships (Junior)	Ounasvaara – Rovaniemi, Finland	Junior World Champion

== Other projects ==
When he is not snowboarding, mountain biking, fishing, or hiking, Steve is an avid blogger who writes several blogs for various websites.

Because his father was diagnosed with and recovered from prostate cancer, Steve is involved with the Prostate Cancer Foundation. Working with their Athletes for a Cure program, Steve is helping build awareness of this prevalent disease.
