= Devin Logan =

American freestyle skier

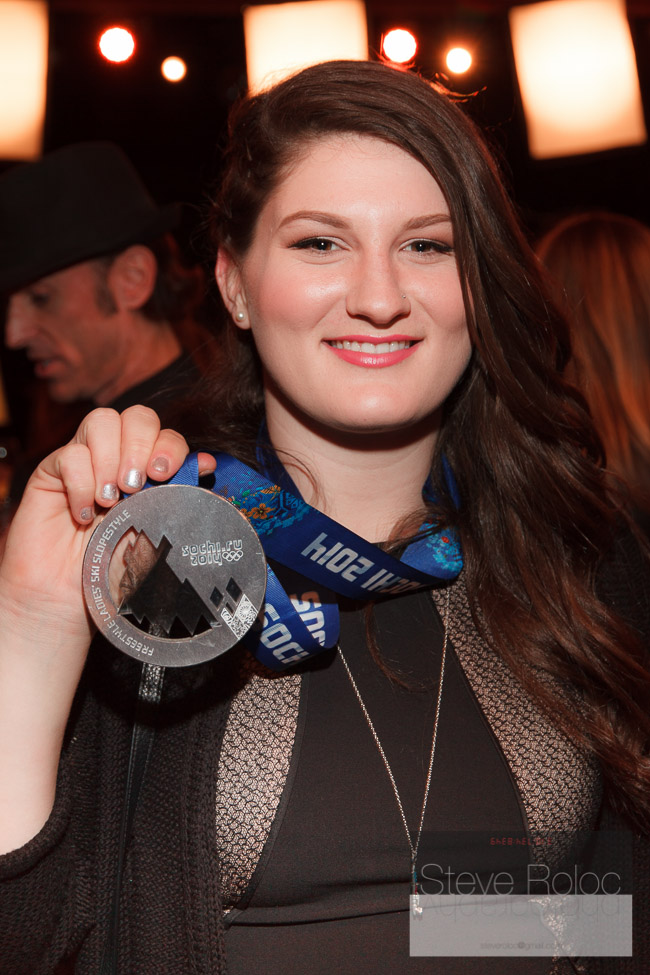
- Logan in 2014

Personal information
- Born: Devin Marie Logan; February 17, 1993 (age 33) Oceanside, New York, U.S.
- Home town: West Dover, Vermont, U.S.
- Height: 5 ft 9 in (175 cm)
Medal record
Women's freestyle skiing
Representing the United States
Olympic Games
Silver medal – second place	2014 Sochi	Slopestyle
Winter X Games
Silver medal – second place	2012 Aspen	Slopestyle

Devin Marie Logan (born February 17, 1993, in Oceanside, New York) is an American freeskier from West Dover, Vermont. She won silver in women's slopestyle event at the 2014 Winter Olympics held in Sochi.

== Early life ==
Logan grew up in Baldwin and Oceanside, New York. Logan was the youngest of five children in an athletic family. At a young age, Logan wanted to ski like her older brothers, two of whom became professional skiers. where she played youth football for the Baldwin Bombers from ages 8 to 10. Before starting high school, Logan moved to Vermont with her mother and siblings to train at the Mount Snow Academy. As of 2014 she was taking classes at Westminster College in Salt Lake City, Utah.

== Competitive skier ==
Logan began her competitive skiing career as a junior in 2010. She was the winner of a silver medal at the 2012 Winter X Games in the slopestyle contest. In late 2012, Logan suffered a severe knee injury, with a torn ACL and MCL and two microfractures, requiring surgery. Logan recovered from the injury, taking home a silver medal in the first ever Olympic slopestyle competition held in the 2014 Winter Olympics in Sochi. Logan scored 85.40 in the event.

During the 2015 season, Logan had two podium finishes in Grand Prix events and won the halfpipe at the Canadian Open Championship. During the 2016 season, she dislocated her shoulder.

Logan was awarded the overall crystal globe for the most consistent skier over International Ski Federation (FIS) freestyle events. Logan was the first freeskier to win the award. At the time of the award, Logan was also the only woman to have competed in both slopestyle and halfpipe.

During the summer, Logan can be found at Mt. Hood, Oregon, where she hosts a Takeover Session at Windells Camp.
