= Sammy Carlson =

American freestyle skier (born 1989)

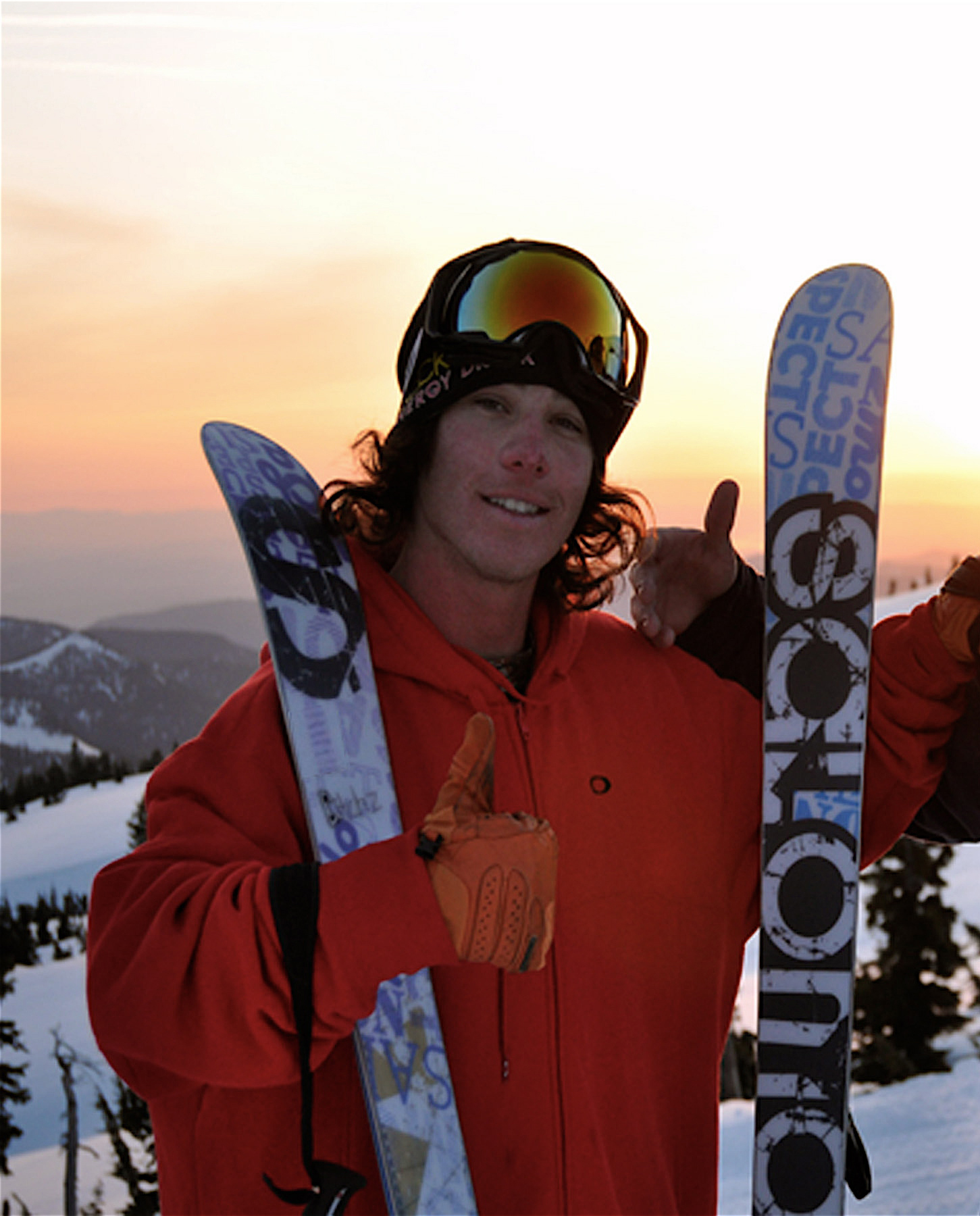

Personal information
- Born: January 11, 1989 (age 37) Portland, Oregon, U.S.
- Height: 174 cm (5 ft 9 in)

Sport
- Sport: Skiing
Medal record
Men's freestyle skiing
Representing United States
FIS Freestyle World Ski Championships
Silver medal – second place	2011 Deer Valley	Slopestyle
Winter X Games
Silver medal – second place	2007 Aspen	SlopeStyle
Silver medal – second place	2009 Aspen	SlopeStyle
Bronze medal – third place	2010 Aspen	SlopeStyle
Bronze medal – third place	2011 Aspen	Big Air
Gold medal – first place	2011 Aspen	SlopeStyle

Sammy Carlson (born January 11, 1989) is an American freeskier specializing in slopestyle competitions. He was the first skier to execute a switch triple rodeo 1260 in July 2010 at Mount Hood. Sammy is the star of the Sammy C Project, a TV documentary about his endeavors into skiing.
