= Winter X Games XVI =

2012 multi-sport event in Aspen, Colorado

Winter X Games XVI (Winter X Games Sixteen)
- Location: (United States) Aspen, Colorado
- Dates: January 26–29

Winter X Games XVI (re-titled Winter X Games Aspen'12; styled as Winter X Games Sixteen in the official logo) were held from January 26 to January 29, 2012, in Aspen, Colorado. They were the 11th consecutive Winter X Games to be held in Aspen. The events were broadcast on ESPN. The following year, the Winter X Games were held in two international cities: Aspen, Colorado and Tignes, France.

== Sports ==
The following are the events at Winter X Games 16.

- Freestyle Skiing
- Snowboarding
- Snowmobiling

== Highlights ==
- Games dedicated to renowned freestyle skier Sarah Burke, who died on January 19, 2012, after a freak accident in training.
- Mark McMorris and Torstein Horgmo landed the first-ever triple corks in the Big Air competition.
- Heath Frisby landed the first-ever snowmobile frontflip in the Best Trick competition.
- Shaun White's final run in the Snowboard SuperPipe final scored a perfect 100.00. White's victory also gave him the first-ever five-peat in that event.
- Mark McMorris became the first snowboarder since Shaun White to win two gold medals in one X Games.

== Results ==
=== Medal count ===
* Host nation (United States)

Rank	Nation	Gold	Silver	Bronze	Total
1	United States (USA)*	10	10	7	27
2	Canada (CAN)	7	1	4	12
3	Norway (NOR)	1	2	2	5
4	Switzerland (SUI)	0	2	0	2
5	Finland (FIN)	0	1	1	2
6	Bulgaria (BUL)	0	1	0	1
6	Slovenia (SLO)	0	1	0	1
8	Australia (AUS)	0	0	2	2
9	Japan (JPN)	0	0	1	1
9	New Zealand (NZL)	0	0	1	1
Totals (10 entries)		18	18	18	54

* Host nation (Host state (Colorado))

Rank	State	Gold	Silver	Bronze	Total
1	California	3	2	4	9
2	Idaho	2	0	0	2
3	Texas	1	1	1	3
4	Vermont	1	1	0	2
5	Colorado*	1	0	1	2
6	Nevada	1	0	0	1
6	Pennsylvania	1	0	0	1
8	Washington	0	1	1	2
9	Alaska	0	1	0	1
9	Indiana	0	1	0	1
9	Michigan	0	1	0	1
9	Minnesota	0	1	0	1
9	Utah	0	1	0	1
Totals (13 entries)		10	10	7	27

=== Skiing ===
==== Men's Slopestyle results ====
Rank	Name	Run 1	Run 2	Run 3	Score
Gold medal	Tom Wallisch (USA)	93.66	59.66	96.00	96.00
Silver medal	Nick Goepper (USA)	88.33	94.66	88.66	94.66
Bronze medal	Andreas Håtveit (NOR)	87.66	90.66	92.00	92.00
4	Gus Kenworthy (USA)	89.33	46.00	36.66	89.33
5	Russ Henshaw (AUS)	85.00	89.00	20.00	89.00
6	P.K. Hunder (NOR)	77.66	86.33	86.00	86.33
7	Bobby Brown (USA)	65.33	39.66	83.33	83.33
8	Alex Schlopy (USA)	33.66	40.00	77.00	77.00

==== Women's Slopestyle results ====
Rank	Name	Run 1	Run 2	Run 3	Score
Gold medal	Kaya Turski (CAN)	88.33	88.66	95.00	95.00
Silver medal	Devin Logan (USA)	56.33	42.66	92.33	92.33
Bronze medal	Anna Segal (AUS)	90.00	86.33	14.66	90.00
4	Keri Herman (USA)	87.00	60.33	45.33	87.00
5	Ashley Battersby (USA)	39.00	85.00	86.00	86.00
6	Dara Howell (CAN)	48.00	81.33	63.00	81.33
7	Emma Dahlström (SWE)	69.33	46.00	77.66	77.66
8	Megan Olenick (USA)	25.00	71.00	30.66	71.00
9	Rose Battersby (NZL)	32.00	29.00	51.00	51.00
10	Kim Lamarre (CAN)	28.66	38.00	39.00	39.00

==== Men's SuperPipe results ====
Rank	Name	Run 1	Run 2	Run 3	Score
Gold medal	David Wise (USA)	86.33	93.00	77.66	93.00
Silver medal	Noah Bowman (CAN)	87.66	38.00	90.00	90.00
Bronze medal	Torin Yater-Wallace (USA)	85.33	38.66	89.66	89.66
4	Kevin Rolland (FRA)	28.00	89.33	26.66	89.33
5	Tucker Perkins (USA)	79.33	86.00	88.33	88.33
6	Simon Dumont (USA)	82.66	74.00	87.00	87.00
7	Mike Riddle (CAN)	80.33	33.33	23.00	80.33
8	Justin Dorey (CAN)	25.33	38.33	DNS	38.33

==== Women's SuperPipe results ====
Rank	Name	Run 1	Run 2	Run 3	Score
Gold medal	Rosalind Groenewoud (CAN)	87.33	93.66	15.66	93.66
Silver medal	Maddie Bowman (USA)	91.00	92.00	90.00	92.00
Bronze medal	Brita Sigourney (USA)	21.66	36.33	90.66	90.66
4	Anais Caradeux (FRA)	89.00	82.33	87.00	89.00
5	Devin Logan (USA)	80.66	87.00	87.66	87.66
6	Keltie Hansen (CAN)	86.33	10.00	29.66	86.33
7	Dara Howell (CAN)	22.33	13.66	70.66	70.66
8	Megan Gunning (CAN)	18.00	24.00	49.00	49.00

==== Men's Big Air results ====
Rank	Name	Two Highest Runs	Score
Gold medal	Bobby Brown (USA)	44 + 44	88
Silver medal	Kai Mahler (SUI)	43 + 41	84
Bronze medal	Jossi Wells (NZL)	44 + 39	83
4	Gus Kenworthy (USA)	37 + 35	72
5	Sammy Carlson (USA)	40 + 32	72

==== Women's Skier X results ====
Rank	Name	Time
Gold medal	Marte Gjefsen (NOR)	1:26.88
Silver medal	Hedda Berntsen (NOR)	1:27.79
Bronze medal	Jenny Owens (AUS)	1:29.06
4	Marielle Berger (FRA)	1:29.17
5	Marielle Thompson (CAN)	2:00.27
6	Sanna Luedi (SUI)	DNF

==== Men's Skier X results ====
Rank	Name	Time
Gold medal	Chris Del Bosco (CAN)	1:20.59
Silver medal	Filip Flisar (SLO)	1:20.73
Bronze medal	Dave Duncan (CAN)	1:20.81
4	Jouni Pellinen (FIN)	1:21.01
5	Casey Puckett (USA)	1:21.45
6	Christian Mithassel (NOR)	1:21.93

==== Men's Mono Skier X results ====
Rank	Name	Time
Gold medal	Samson Danniels (CAN)	1:51.98
Silver medal	Gregory Peck (USA)	1:52.61
Bronze medal	Josh Dueck (CAN)	1:53.14
4	Sean Rose (UK)	1:53.57

=== Snowboarding ===
==== Men's Snowboard Street results ====
Rank	Name	Score
Gold medal	Forest Bailey (USA)	88
Silver medal	Ryan Paul (USA)	83
Bronze medal	Nick Visconti (USA)	76
4	Ethan Deiss (USA)	74
5	Phil Jacques (CAN)	10

==== Women's Snowboard Slopestyle results ====
Rank	Name	Score
Gold medal	Jamie Anderson (USA)	95.33
Silver medal	Enni Rukajärvi (FIN)	82.66
Bronze medal	Kjersti Oestgaard Buaas (NOR)	78.33
4	Charlotte van Gils (NED)	65.00
5	Spencer O'Brien (CAN)	60.00
6	Silje Norendal (NOR)	55.00
7	Cheryl Maas (NED)	44.66
8	Silvia Mittermueller (GER)	31.66
9	Šárka Pančochová (CZE)	24.00
10	Rebecca Torr (NZL)	15.66

==== Women's SuperPipe results ====
Rank	Name	Run 1	Run 2	Run 3	Score
Gold medal	Kelly Clark (USA)	73.66	90.00	93.66	93.66
Silver medal	Elena Hight (USA)	65.00	80.66	83.66	83.66
Bronze medal	Hannah Teter (USA)	35.00	76.00	12.00	76.00
4	Gretchen Bleiler (USA)	12.66	56.66	65.00	65.00
5	Kaitlyn Farrington (USA)	18.33	60.00	28.00	60.00
6	Cai Xuetong (CHN)	51.66	39.66	17.33	51.66
7	Torah Bright (AUS)	27.66	15.33	24.33	27.66
8	Maddy Schaffrick (USA)	14.33	11.00	12.66	14.33

==== Men's Big Air results ====
Rank	Name	Score
Gold medal	Mark McMorris (CAN)	80
Silver medal	Torstein Horgmo (NOR)	76
Bronze medal	Sebastien Toutant (CAN)	76
4	Eric Willett (USA)	76
5	Seppe Smits (BEL)	68

==== Women's Snowboard X results ====
Rank	Name	Time
Gold medal	Dominique Maltais (CAN)	1:31.61
Silver medal	Alexandra Jekova (BUL)	1:33.34
Bronze medal	Maelle Ricker (CAN)	1:33.64
4	Susi Moll (AUT)	1:34.53
5	Yuka Fujimori (JPN)	1:35.19
6	Zoe Gillings (GBR)	1:35.73

==== Men's Snowboard X results ====
Rank	Name	Time
Gold medal	Nate Holland (USA)	1:27.57
Silver medal	Nick Baumgartner (USA)	1:28.10
Bronze medal	Jayson Hale (USA)	1:33.27
4	Alex Deibold (USA)	1:56.82
5	Pierre Vaultier (FRA)	2:46.44
6	Stian Sivertzen (NOR)	3:10.80

==== Men's Slopestyle results ====
Rank	Name	Run 1	Run 2	Run 3	Score
Gold medal	Mark McMorris (CAN)	90.00	93.00	8.33	93.00
Silver medal	Sage Kotsenburg (USA)	30.00	37.66	88.00	88.00
Bronze medal	Peetu Piiroinen (FIN)	60.00	70.00	86.00	86.00
4	Sebastien Toutant (CAN)	83.66	47.66	21.66	83.66
5	Seppe Smits (BEL)	26.00	40.66	79.33	79.33
6	Gjermund Braaten (NOR)	29.00	78.66	17.00	78.66
7	Eric Willett (USA)	38.66	63.00	37.00	63.00
8	Torstein Horgmo (NOR)	28.33	24.00	29.66	29.66

==== Men's SuperPipe results ====
Rank	Name	Run 1	Run 2	Run 3	Score
Gold medal	Shaun White (USA)	94.00	71.33	100.00	100.00
Silver medal	Iouri Podladtchikov (SUI)	90.00	92.00	93.00	93.00
Bronze medal	Ryo Aono (JPN)	73.33	68.66	86.00	86.00
4	Christian Haller (SUI)	33.33	83.00	13.33	83.00
5	Matt Ladley (USA)	78.66	29.66	41.33	78.66
6	Louie Vito (USA)	70.00	9.33	18.66	70.00
7	Greg Bretz (USA)	60.00	10.00	7.33	60.00
8	Luke Mitrani (USA)	37.00	32.00	37.66	37.66

- Shaun White became the third athlete in Winter X Games history to achieve a five-peat. His 100-point victory run included a Double McTwist 1260 combo'd into the first-ever frontside double cork 1260. It was the first-ever perfect score in the history of SuperPipe.

=== Snowmobile ===
==== Freestyle results ====
Rank	Name	Run 1	Run 2	Score
Gold medal	Colten Moore (USA)	92.66	93.66	93.66
Silver medal	Joe Parsons (USA)	90.66	89.00	90.66
Bronze medal	Caleb Moore (USA)	87.00	86.00	87.00
4	Heath Frisby (USA)	80.00	82.66	82.66

==== Best Trick results ====
Rank	Name	Score
Gold medal	Heath Frisby (USA)	96.66
Silver medal	Colten Moore (USA)	89.66
Bronze medal	Joe Parsons (USA)	88.00
4	Cory Davis (USA)	79.33
5	Caleb Moore (USA)	72.00
6	Justin Hoyer (USA)	71.33

- Frisby won gold with the first-ever Frontflip
- Colten Moore won silver with a Tsunami flip
- Justin Hoyer attempted a double back flip, but under-rotated, fell over his handlebars, and broke his arm
