= Hana Beaman =

American snowboarder

Hana Beaman is an American professional snowboarder who resides in Big Bear Lake, CA and Bellingham, WA. She has competed in professional snowboarding since 1999.

== Career ==
Since 2002, Beaman has consistently placed in the top 10 at international snowboard competitions such as the Winter X Games and Burton US Open and the Roxy Chicken Jam. She competes primarily in slopestyle events, where she has been working on adding 720's to her tricks. In 2003 Hana got her first snowmobile and began filming with fellow snowboarder Travis Rice in and around Jackson Hole. Since 2005 Hana has also turned her attention to backcountry snowboarding and filming, including Misschief Films, an all-girl film project and in 2011, a series of webisodes for Snowboarder Magazine. The 2012 season was the first season Hana devoted entirely to filming and backcountry riding, not competing in a single competition. The time away from competitions has allowed her to focus her time in filming for the web series P.S...Webisodes.

Since 2007, Hana Beaman has been asked to be a Signature Session™ Pro at High Cascade Snowboard Camp each summer. As a Signature Session Pro, Hana coaches young snowboarders and gives back to the sport.

== Competition results ==
Career Highlights

2011 - 7th - Winter X Games 15 - Slopestyle - Aspen, CO
2010 - 5th - Winter X Games - Slopestyle - Aspen, CO
2007 - 2nd - Winter X Games - Slopestyle - Aspen, CO
2007 - 3rd - Burton New Zealand Open - Slopestyle - Snowpark, New Zealand
2007 - 2nd - Abominable Snowjam - Slopestyle - Mt. Hood, OR
2007 - 1st - Nissan X-Trail Nippon Open - Slopestyle - Japan
2006 - 1st - Burton New Zealand Open - Slopestyle - Snowpark, New Zealand
2006 - 2nd - Winter X Games - Slopestyle - Aspen, CO
2006 - 1st - Burton US Open - Slopestyle - Stratton, VT
2004 - 3rd - Burton US Open - Slopestyle - Stratton, VT
2003 - 1st - Burton US Open - Slopestyle - Stratton, VT
