= Alex Schlopy =

American freestyle skier

Medal record

Men's Freestyle skiing

Representing the United States

FIS Freestyle World Ski Championships
Gold medal – first place	2011 Park City	Slopestyle

Winter X Games
Gold medal – first place	2011 Aspen	Big Air

Winter Dew Tour
Gold medal – first place	2011 Snow Basin	Slopestyle
Bronze medal – third place	2011 Overall	Slopestyle

Alex Schlopy (born July 25, 1992) is an American freeskier from Park City, Utah. He was the winner of a gold medal at the 2011 Winter X Games in the big air contest. The following week, he won the gold medal in slopestyle at the 2011 FIS Freestyle World Ski Championships.

Schlopy attended The Winter Sports School in Park City. His mother, Holly Flanders, was a three-time winner on the FIS Alpine Skiing World Cup circuit. His father, Todd Schlopy, is a former NFL placekicker for the Buffalo Bills. Todd's cousin, Erik Schlopy, is a former alpine skier who competed at three editions of the Olympics.
