= Kjersti Buaas =

Norwegian snowboarder (born 1982)

Personal information
- Full name: Kjersti Østgaard Buaas
- Born: 5 January 1982 (age 44) Trondheim
- Height: 160 cm (5 ft 3 in)

Sport
- Country: Norway
- Sport: Snowboarding
- Event: Women's slopestyle
Medal record
Women's Snowboarding
Representing Norway
Women's Snowboarding
Bronze medal – third place	2006 Turin	Women's Halfpipe
X Games Medal Record
Bronze medal – third place	2012 Aspen	Slopestyle
- Updated on 7 February 2014

Kjersti Østgaard Buaas (born 5 January 1982) is a Norwegian snowboarder from Trondheim. She placed 4th in women's half-pipe at the 2002 Winter Olympics in Salt Lake City, United States. She received a bronze medal at the 2006 Winter Olympics in women's half-pipe in Turin, Italy. Buaas recovered from a broken leg only a week before her bronze-winning ride.

In 2007/2008 she finished World No.3 on the Swatch TTR World Snowboard Tour (Ticket to Ride (World Snowboard Tour))

== Competition Results ==
Swatch TTR 2008/2009 Season

- 3rd – Slopestyle – 6Star Burton European Open (Ticket to Ride (World Snowboard Tour))
- 2nd – Halfpipe – 6Star Burton European Open (Ticket to Ride (World Snowboard Tour))
- 4th – Halfpipe – 6Star Burton US Open (Ticket to Ride (World Snowboard Tour))
- 1st – Slopestyle – 6Star Burton US Open (Ticket to Ride (World Snowboard Tour))
