= Joe Parsons (snowmobiler) =

American snowmobiler (born 1988)

Joe Parsons (born January 21, 1988 in Yakima, Washington) is an American snowmobiler who, as of January 2017, has won 17 medals at the Winter X Games.
