= FIS Freestyle World Ski Championships 2013 – Women's slopestyle =

The women's slopestyle competition of the FIS Freestyle World Ski Championships 2013 was held at Myrkdalen-Voss, Norway on March 9 (qualifying and final). 21 athletes from 11 countries competed.

== Qualification ==
The following are the results of the qualification.

Rank	Bib	Name	Country	Run 1	Run 2	Best	Notes
1	20	Grete Eliassen	United States	80.2	88.0	88.0	Q
2	9	Yuki Tsubota	Canada	72.6	85.4	85.4	Q
3	1	Tiril Sjåstad Christiansen	Norway	81.8	29.0	81.8	Q
4	3	Kaya Turski	Canada	78.6	76.2	78.6	Q
5	5	Katie Summerhayes	Great Britain	15.2	69.2	69.2	Q
6	21	Alexi Micinski	United States	18.2	67.4	67.4	Q
7	2	Dara Howell	Canada	67.2	31.2	67.2	Q
8	16	Jamie Crane-Mauzy	United States	4.4	65.0	65.0	Q
9	6	Dominique Ohaco	Chile	62.8	30.2	62.8	Q
10	8	Natalia Slepecka	Slovakia	53.8	22.8	53.8	Q
11	28	Maiko Hara	Japan	32.4	52.2	52.2	Q
12	10	Anna Willcox-Silfverberg	New Zealand	16.0	46.4	46.4	Q
13	19	Reiko Oka	Japan	38.0	38.2	38.2	
14	7	Chiho Takao	Japan	36.8	37.6	37.6	
15	26	Katrien Aerts	Belgium	35.4	31.0	35.4	
16	18	Zuzana Stromkova	Slovakia	18.8	33.8	33.8	
17	23	Lisa Zimmermann	Germany	22.8	DNS	22.8	
18	12	Sarah Pöppel	Germany	10.4	DNS	10.4	
	30	Nina Rusten Andersen	Norway	DNS	DNS	DNS	
	24	Melanie Kraizel	Chile	DNS	DNS	DNS	
	17	Anna Mirtova	Russia	DNS	DNS	DNS	

== Final ==
The following are the results of the final.

Rank	Bib	Name	Country	Run 1	Run 2	Best
1st place, gold medalist(s)	3	Kaya Turski	Canada	14.2	89.6	89.6
2nd place, silver medalist(s)	2	Dara Howell	Canada	85.6	82.0	85.6
3rd place, bronze medalist(s)	20	Grete Eliassen	United States	81.2	78.4	81.2
4	5	Katie Summerhayes	Great Britain	21.0	72.2	72.2
5	9	Yuki Tsubota	Canada	70.4	59.0	70.4
6	21	Alexi Micinski	United States	64.6	29.0	64.6
7	16	Jamie Crane-Mauzy	United States	10.0	61.6	61.6
8	8	Natalia Slepecka	Slovakia	19.8	56.8	56.8
9	6	Dominique Ohaco	Chile	51.6	13.6	51.6
10	10	Anna Willcox-Silfverberg	New Zealand	40.0	10.8	40.0
11	1	Tiril Sjåstad Christiansen	Norway	11.4	34.4	34.4
12	28	Maiko Hara	Japan	21.2	DNS	21.2
