= FIS Freestyle World Ski Championships 2011 – Women's slopestyle =

The women's slopestyle competition of the FIS Freestyle World Ski Championships 2011 was held at Park City Mountain Resort, Park City, Utah, United States on February 3, 2011 (qualifications and finals).

20 athletes from 9 countries competed.

== Results ==
=== Qualification ===
The following are the results of the qualification.

Rank	Bib	Name	Country	Run 1	Run 2	Best Score	Note
1	1	Devin Logan	United States	42.30	40.30	42.30	Q
2	2	Kim Lamarre	Canada	38.90	41.50	41.50	Q
3	12	Kaya Turski	Canada	39.60	41.30	41.30	Q
4	5	Keri Herman	United States	40.10	39.70	40.10	Q
5	8	Grete Eliassen	Norway	37.70	39.90	39.90	Q
6	6	Ashley Battersby	United States	38.10	18.30	38.10	Q
7	24	Jessica Warll	Canada	33.90	35.50	35.50	Q
8	7	Anna Segal	Australia	35.10	35.40	35.40	Q
9	4	Megan Olenick	United States	31.50	17.80	31.50	Q
10	16	Tir Sjaastad Christiansen	Norway	27.80	30.10	30.10	Q
11	20	Katie Summerhayes	United Kingdom	27.10	28.80	28.80	
12	9	Maria Bagge	Sweden	26.90	28.50	28.50	
13	19	Emma Dahsltrom	Sweden	27.90	16.20	27.90	
14	21	Natalia Slepecka	Slovakia	12.00	27.00	27.00	
15	23	Caja Schoepf	Germany	24.40	11.90	24.40	
16	11	Lena Stoffel	Germany	13.40	24.20	24.20	
17	25	Mikayla Austin	New Zealand	21.50	19.90	21.50	
18	13	Nina Rusten Andersen	Norway	21.50	11.60	21.50	
19	18	Rose Battersby	New Zealand	7.90	9.50	9.50	
	17	Maude Raymond	Canada			DNS	

=== Final ===
Rank	Bib	Name	Country	Run 1	Run 2	Best Score	Notes
1st place, gold medalist(s)	7	Anna Segal	Australia	43.40	42.90	43.40	
2nd place, silver medalist(s)	12	Kaya Turski	Canada	41.70	18.60	41.70	
3rd place, bronze medalist(s)	5	Keri Herman	United States	40.10	41.00	41.00	
4	2	Kim Lamarre	Canada	38.00	39.10	39.10	
5	1	Devin Logan	United States	32.40	36.80	36.80	
6	6	Ashley Battersby	United States	34.90	35.90	35.90	
7	8	Grete Eliassen	Norway	34.10	33.60	34.10	
8	16	Tir Sjaastad Christiansen	Norway	8.60	32.30	32.30	
9	4	Megan Olenick	United States	30.30	31.10	31.10	
10	24	Jessica Warll	Canada			DNS	
