= Winter X Games XX =

2016 extreme sports tournament

Winter X Games XX (Winter X Games Twenty)
- Location: (United States) Aspen, Colorado
- Dates: January 28–31

Winter X Games XX (re-titled Winter X Games Aspen '16; styled as Winter X Games Twenty in the official logo) were held from January 28 to January 31, 2016, in Aspen, Colorado. They were the 15th consecutive Winter X Games held in Aspen. The events were broadcast on ESPN.

Participating athletes competed in eight Skiing events, nine Snowboarding events, and three Snowmobiling events.

== Results ==
=== Medal count ===
* Host nation (United States)

Rank	Nation	Gold	Silver	Bronze	Total
1	United States (USA)*	8	10	6	24
2	Canada (CAN)	5	4	2	11
3	France (FRA)	2	1	3	6
4	Samoa (SAM)	2	0	0	2
5	Switzerland (SUI)	1	0	1	2
6	Estonia (EST)	1	0	0	1
6	Finland (FIN)	1	0	0	1
6	New Zealand (NZL)	1	0	0	1
9	Norway (NOR)	0	1	3	4
10	Japan (JPN)	0	1	1	2
11	Czech Republic (CZE)	0	1	0	1
11	Sweden (SWE)	0	1	0	1
13	China (CHN)	0	0	1	1
13	Germany (GER)	0	0	1	1
Totals (14 entries)		21	19	18	58

=== Skiing ===
==== Men's SuperPipe results ====
Rank	Name	Run 1	Run 2	Run 3	Best Score
Gold medal	Jossi Wells (FRA)	29.66	24.66	93.33	93.33
Silver medal	Gus Kenworthy (USA)	91.33	92.33	31.66	92.33
Bronze medal	Benoit Valentin (FRA)	14.66	90.66	24.00	90.66
4	Alex Ferreira (USA)	87.00	86.66	82.33	87.00
5	Torin Yater-Wallace (USA)	83.00	17.00	86.33	86.33
6	Lyman Currier (USA)	81.33	86.00	38.66	86.00
7	Byron Wells (NZL)	85.33	14.00	16.00	85.33
8	David Wise (USA)	13.66	75.00	12.00	75.00

==== Women's SlopeStyle results ====
Rank	Name	Run 1	Run 2	Run 3	Best Score
Gold medal	Kelly Sildaru (EST)	93.00	89.66	51.66	93.00
Silver medal	Tiril Sjåstad Christiansen (NOR)	88.33	90.00	91.66	91.66
Bronze medal	Johanne Killi (NOR)	85.66	39.66	77.66	85.66
4	Maggie Voisin (USA)	71.33	83.66	84.66	84.66
5	Dara Howell (CAN)	70.66	15.66	76.33	76.33
6	Emma Dahlström (SWE)	38.33	66.00	39.66	66.00
7	Devin Logan (USA)	65.66	23.66	5.33	65.66
8	Keri Herman (USA)	60.00	51.66	60.66	60.66

==== Women's SuperPipe results ====
Rank	Name	Run 1	Run 2	Run 3	Best Score
Gold medal	Maddie Bowman (USA)	85.33	87.33	89.00	89.00
Silver medal	Ayana Onozuka (JPN)	77.33	81.66	85.00	85.00
Bronze medal	Annalisa Drew (USA)	83.00	16.66	79.00	83.00
4	Cassie Sharpe (CAN)	79.33	71.00	24.33	79.33
5	Janina Kuzma (NZL)	74.00	33.00	72.33	74.00
6	Rosalind Groenewoud (CAN)	69.33	69.66	70.33	70.33
7	Devin Logan (USA)	13.00	33.00	63.33	63.33
8	Brita Sigourney (USA)	43.66	20.66	14.00	43.66

==== Men's Mono Skier X results ====
Rank	Name	Time
Gold medal	Jerome Elbrycht (FRA)	1:12.207
Silver medal	Nikko Landeros (USA)	1:12.545
Bronze medal	Kevin Bramble (USA)	1:12.903
4	Josh Elliott (USA)	1:12.963

==== Men's Skier X results ====
Rank	Name	Time
Gold medal	Brady Leman (CAN)	0:48.571
Silver medal	Bastien Midol (FRA)	0:49.108
Bronze medal	Chris Del Bosco (CAN)	0:49.277
4	Alex Fiva (SUI)	0:49.297
5	Thomas Zangerl (AUT)	0:49.480
6	Jonas Lenherr (SUI)	0:49.913

==== Women's Skier X results ====
Rank	Name	Time
Gold medal	Kelsey Serwa (CAN)	0:51.417
Silver medal	Marielle Thompson (CAN)	0:51.812
Bronze medal	Alizee Baron (FRA)	0:52.061
4	Ophelie David (FRA)	0:52.264
5	Katrin Ofner (AUT)	0:52.780
6	Anna Holmlund (SWE)	0:53.090

==== Men's Big Air results ====
Rank	Name	Score
Gold medal	Fabian Bösch (SUI)	86
Silver medal	Bobby Brown (USA)	85
Bronze medal	Elias Ambühl (SUI)	84
4	Henrik Harlaut (SWE)	80
5	Kai Mahler (SUI)	79
6	Vincent Gagnier (CAN)	78

==== Men's SlopeStyle results ====
Rank	Name	Run 1	Run 2	Run 3	Best Score
Gold medal	Jossi Wells (NZL)	88.33	84.33	90.00	90.00
Silver medal	Gus Kenworthy (USA)	81.00	81.00	87.33	87.33
Bronze medal	Øystein Bråten (NOR)	84.33	35.00	82.00	84.33
4	James Woods (GBR)	82.33	83.00	76.33	83.00
5	Bobby Brown (USA)	67.00	82.00	82.66	82.66
6	Andri Ragettli (SUI)	80.33	74.66	30.66	80.33
7	McRae Williams (USA)	74.66	19.66	49.33	74.66
8	Alex Bellemare (CAN)	27.33	29.33	66.33	66.33

=== Snowboarding ===
==== Special Olympics Unified Snowboarding Dual Slalom results ====
Rank	Name	Time
Gold medal	Chris Klug (USA) / Henry Meece (USA)	36.0
Silver medal	Danny Davis (USA) / Zach Elder (USA)	36.8
Bronze medal	Hannah Teter (USA) / Daina Shilts (USA)	38.0
4	Sage Kotsenburg (USA) / Denny Wedekind (GER)	38.5
5	Jamie Anderson (USA) / Cody Field (USA)	41.6
6	Chloe Kim (USA) / Christopher Mitchell (USA)	43.6
7	Silje Norendal (NOR) / Andre Berg (NOR)	44.3
8	Josh Kerr (AUS) / Steven Utgaard (USA)	48.9

==== Women's SlopeStyle results ====
Rank	Name	Run 1	Run 2	Run 3	Best Score
Gold medal	Spencer O'Brien (CAN)	79.33	91.00	89.33	91.00
Silver medal	Jamie Anderson (USA)	77.00	31.66	89.00	89.00
Bronze medal	Hailey Langland (USA)	85.00	88.00	87.66	88.00
4	Silje Norendal (NOR)	66.33	79.33	85.00	85.00
5	Christy Prior (NZL)	82.66	84.00	25.66	84.00
6	Katie Ormerod (GBR)	74.66	30.00	23.33	74.66
7	Klaudia Medlova (SVK)	36.33	24.66	55.66	55.66
8	Cheryl Maas (NED)	54.66	48.00	24.66	54.66

==== Men's Big Air results ====
Rank	Name	Score
Gold medal	Max Parrot (CAN)	93
Silver medal	Mark McMorris (CAN)	91
Bronze medal	Yuki Kadono (JPN)	88
4	Sebastien Toutant (CAN)	84
5	Ståle Sandbech (NOR)	78
6	Darcy Sharpe (CAN)	64

==== Men's SlopeStyle results ====
Rank	Name	Run 1	Run 2	Run 3	Best Score
Gold medal	Mark McMorris (CAN)	13.33	92.66	24.00	92.66
Silver medal	Sebastien Toutant (CAN)	90.00	26.33	12.00	90.00
Bronze medal	Mons Røisland (NOR)	12.66	17.33	86.33	86.33
4	Eric Willett (USA)	82.66	13.66	11.00	82.66
5	Aleksander Østreng (NOR)	19.66	77.66	47.33	77.66
6	Darcy Sharpe (CAN)	60.00	34.66	18.66	60.00
7	Ståle Sandbech (NOR)	19.33	33.33	55.66	55.66
8	Sven Thorgren (SWE)	30.00	50.00	20.33	50.00

==== Men's SuperPipe results ====
Note: The competition was limited to 1st run scores due to halfpipe conditions becoming unsatisfactory because of inclement weather.

Rank	Name	Best Score
Gold medal	Matt Ladley (USA)	82.33
Silver medal	Ben Ferguson (USA)	79.00
Bronze medal	Scotty James (AUS)	76.00
4	Brett Esser (USA)	66.66
5	Gabe Ferguson (USA)	60.33
6	Jan Scherrer (SUI)	57.33
7	Taku Hiraoka (JPN)	57.00
8	Christian Haller (SUI)	50.00

==== Men's Snowboard X Adaptive results ====
Rank	Name	Time
Gold medal	Matti Suur-Hamari (FIN)	1:04.820
Silver medal	Alex Massie (CAN)	1:05.531
Bronze medal	Ben Tudhope (AUS)	1:08.609
4	Mike Shea (USA)	1:09.126
5	Evan Strong (USA)	1:09.451
6	Owen Pick (GBR)	16:39.999

==== Men's Snowboarder X results ====
Rank	Name	Time
Gold medal	Jarryd Hughes (AUS)	0:59.292
Silver medal	Alex Pullin (AUS)	0.59.332
Bronze medal	Konstantin Schad (GER)	0:59.522
4	Alessandro Hämmerle (AUT)	0:59.525
5	Trevor Jacob (USA)	1:00.680
6	Nikolay Olyunin (RUS)	16:39.999

==== Women's Snowboarder X results ====
Rank	Name	Time
Gold medal	Lindsey Jacobellis (USA)	1:00.957
Silver medal	Eva Samková (CZE)	1:00.998
Bronze medal	Nelly Moenne Loccoz (FRA)	1:02.943
4	Belle Brockhoff (AUS)	1:03.290
5	Faye Gulini (USA)	1:04.344
6	Chloe Trespeuch (FRA)	1:42.893

==== Women's SuperPipe results ====
Rank	Name	Run 1	Run 2	Run 3	Best Score
Gold medal	Chloe Kim (USA)	63.00	95.00	17.33	95.00
Silver medal	Arielle Gold (USA)	86.00	10.33	32.00	86.00
Bronze medal	Cai Xuetong (CHN)	78.33	80.33	13.66	80.33
4	Liu Jiayu (CHN)	72.33	70.00	76.00	76.00
5	Kelly Clark (USA)	6.33	74.00	4.00	74.00
6	Hannah Teter (USA)	23.66	24.66	67.33	67.33
7	Maddie Mastro (USA)	20.00	41.00	64.00	64.00
8	Elena Hight (USA)	59.66	38.33	32.00	59.66

=== Snowmobiling ===
==== SnoCross Adaptive results ====
Rank	Name	Time
Gold medal	Mike Schultz (USA)	4:32.944
Silver medal	Paul Thacker (USA)	5:26.438
Bronze medal	E.J. Poplawski (USA)	5:30.674
4	Jim Wazny (USA)	5:33.096
5	Chris Heppding (USA)	DNF
6	Jeff Tweet (USA)	DNF
7	Billy Burkhardt (USA)	DNF

==== SnoCross results ====
Rank	Name	Time
Gold medal	Tucker Hibbert (USA)	16:05.739
Silver medal	Adam Renheim (SWE)	16:16.443
Bronze medal	Corin Todd (USA)	16:20.037
4	Logan Christian (USA)	16:21.572
5	John Stenberg (SWE)	16:28.643
6	Elias Ishoel (NOR)	16:31.938
7	Tim Tremblay (CAN)	16:34.195
8	Corey Watkinson (CAN)	16:40.458
9	Jake Scott (USA)	16:43.153
10	Ross Martin (USA)	DNF

==== Freestyle results ====
Joe Parsons won the gold medal by doing an amazing trick that he landed sitting with his back towards the handle bars.

Rank	Name	Run 1	Run 2	Best Score
Gold medal	Joe Parsons (USA)	90.00	79.33	90.00
Silver medal	Heath Frisby (USA)	87.00	87.66	87.66
Bronze medal	Brett Turcotte (CAN)	86.00	86.66	86.66
4	Cory Davis (USA)	83.33	83.66	83.66
5	Willie Elam (USA)	81.00	82.66	82.66
6	Rasmus Johansson (SWE)	80.00	80.00	80.00
7	Josh Penner (CAN)	42.00	75.33	75.33
8	Colten Moore (USA)	69.66	58.66	69.66

=== Halo ===
Halo 5: Guardians 4v4 tournament. The event was part of the Halo Championship Series, but did not have an effect on standings.

Place	Team	Roster
1	Evil Geniuses	Commonly, Lunchbox, Roy, Snipedown, Towey (coach)
2	Counter Logic Gaming	Frosty, Lethul, Royal2, SnakeBite
3	Team Allegiance	Cratos, eL TowN, Naded, Suspector
4	Renegades	Ninja, Spartan, StelluR, Victory X
5-8th	Dream Team	Aries, JessePeace, Prototype, TireIron
5-8th	PENTA Sports	Anima, BlizZ, Triczr, Soul
5-8th	Epsilon eSports	BUK20, BUK57, Jimbo, Snipedrone
5-8th	Team Liquid	Ace, APG, Heinz, UnLegit, TiberiusAudley (coach)
