= Winter X Games Europe =

French winter sports competition

The Winter X Games Europe is an annual sports event – the European edition of the Winter X Games – held in Tignes, France. The first edition was held from March 10–12, 2010. It was the first Winter X Games competition held outside of the United States. The events are broadcast by ESPN and Canal+. The event consists of slopestyle and superpipe competitions for both skiers and snowboarders on men's and women's sides. Snowmobile riders deliver an exhibition performance.

== 2010 results ==
=== Snowboard ===
==== Men's Slopestyle ====
Rank	Name	Score
Gold medal	Eric Willett (USA)	91.00
Silver medal	Sage Kotsenburg (USA)	85.33
Bronze medal	Mark Grilč (SLO)	83.66

==== Women's Slopestyle ====
Rank	Name	Score
Gold medal	Jenny Jones (UK)	92.33
Silver medal	Kjersti Østgaard Buaas (NOR)	86.66
Bronze medal	Sina Candrian (SUI)	83.00

==== Men's Superpipe ====
Rank	Name	Score
Gold medal	Iouri Podladtchikov (SUI)	98.00
Silver medal	Mathieu Crépel (FRA)	95.00
Bronze medal	Louie Vito (USA)	92.33

==== Women's Superpipe ====
Rank	Name	Score
Gold medal	Kaitlyn Farrington (USA)	97.00
Silver medal	Torah Bright (AUS)	95.00
Bronze medal	Sophie Rodriguez (FRA)	87.00

=== Skiing ===
==== Men's Slopestyle Final ====
Rank	Name	Run 1	Run 2	Run 3	Score
Gold medal	Tom Wallisch (USA)	84.00	94.00	93.66	94.00
Silver medal	Bobby Brown (USA)	47.00	48.33	93.00	93.00
Bronze medal	Jossi Wells (NZL)	89.00	84.00	30.00	89.00
4	TJ Schiller (CAN)	65.00	68.33	88.00	88.00
5	Henrik Harlaut (SWE)	85.33	18.33	87.33	87.33
6	Andreas Håtveit (NOR)	83.00	87.00	85.00	87.00
7	Elias Ambühl (SUI)	35.00	84.66	85.00	85.00
8	Alex Schlopy (USA)	72.33	58.00	22.33	72.33

==== Women's Slopestyle Final ====
Rank	Name	Run 1	Run 2	Run 3	Score
Gold medal	Kaya Turski (CAN)	89.00	93.66	47.66	93.66
Silver medal	Keri Herman (USA)	71.00	84.00	43.33	84.00
Bronze medal	Ashley Battersby (USA)	80.00	83.33	77.33	83.33
5	Anna Segal (AUS)	76.00	41.33	82.66	82.66
5	Lena Stoffel (GER)	65.00	68.00	66.33	68.00
6	Grete Eliassen (NOR)	50.00	26.00	56.00	56.00
7	Sarah Burke (CAN)	41.00	30.66	31.66	41.00
8	Rosalind Groenewoud (CAN)	28.66	-	-	28.66

==== Men's Superpipe Final ====
Rank	Name	Run 1	Run 2	Run 3	Score
Gold medal	Kevin Rolland (FRA)	95.00	76.00	95.66	95.66
Silver medal	Xavier Bertoni (FRA)	80.66	89.33	92.00	92.00
Bronze medal	Justin Dorey (CAN)	86.66	38.00	10.00	86.66
4	Mike Riddle (CAN)	56.33	85.00	40.66	85.00
5	Byron Wells (NZL)	84.33	23.33	15.00	84.33
6	Jossi Wells (NZL)	36.33	82.66	35.66	82.66
7	Tucker Perkins (USA)	79.33	80.33	54.00	80.33
8	Antti-Jussi Kemppainen (FIN)	50.00	70.33	75.33	75.33

==== Women's Superpipe Final ====
Rank	Name	Run 1	Run 2	Run 3	Score
Gold medal	Jen Hudak (USA)	90.33	90.33	91.66	91.66
Silver medal	Rosalind Groenewoud (CAN)	70.00	84.66	79.66	84.66
Bronze medal	Anais Caradeux (FRA)	23.33	82.66	83.33	83.33
4	Virginie Faivre (SUI)	72.66	77.33	81.66	81.66
5	Dania Assaly (CAN)	60.00	36.33	78.33	78.33
6	Sarah Burke (CAN)	76.00	18.33	40.00	76.00
7	Mirjam Jaeger (SUI)	64.66	66.00	74.00	74.00
8	Megan Gunning (CAN)	61.66	46.66	30.00	61.66

== 2011 results ==
The second Winter X Games Europe edition was held in Tignes (France) from the 16th of March to the 18th of March 2011.

=== Skiing ===
==== Men's Slopestyle Final ====
Rank	Name	Run 1	Run 2	Run 3	Score
Gold medal	JF Houle (CAN)	88.00	94.33	19.66	94.33
Silver medal	Andreas Håtveit (NOR)	75.00	92.33	89.33	92.33
Bronze medal	James Woods (UK)	89.66	55.00	25.00	89.66
4	Russ Henshaw (AUS)	88.33	41.66	41.66	88.33
5	Phil Casabon (USA)	15.00	80.66	51.33	80.66
6	Alex Schlopy (USA)	32.33	77.33	38.66	77.33
7	Gus Kenworthy (USA)	70.00	76.00	32.33	76.00
8	Bobby Brown (USA)	36.66	65.00	30.00	65.00

==== Women's Slopestyle Final ====
Rank	Name	Run 1	Run 2	Run 3	Score
Gold medal	Kaya Turski (CAN)	20.00	89.66	92.00	92.00
Silver medal	Keri Herman (USA)	85.00	41.66	89.00	89.00
Bronze medal	Kim Lamarre (CAN)	86.66	66.33	88.33	88.33
5	Anna Segal (AUS)	80.00	84.00	28.33	84.00
5	Devin Logan (USA)	83.66	10.66	0.00	83.66
6	Ashley Battersby (USA)	76.66	23.33	76.66	76.66

==== Men's Superpipe Final ====
Rank	Name	Run 1	Run 2	Run 3	Score
Gold medal	Kevin Rolland (FRA)	93.00	80.66	79.66	93.00
Silver medal	Justin Dorey (CAN)	90.00	48.33	88.33	90.00
Bronze medal	Torin Yater-Wallace (USA)	65.00	81.66	88.00	88.00
4	Simon Dumont (USA)	70.00	87.00	85.33	87.00
5	Thomas Krief (FRA)	59.33	85.00	25.00	85.00
6	Duncan Adams (USA)	78.66	64.66	68.66	78.66
7	Jossi Wells (NZL)	35.00	71.66	41.66	71.66
8	David Wise (USA)	15.00	20.00	68.00	68.00

==== Women's Superpipe Final ====
Rank	Name	Run 1	Run 2	Run 3	Score
Gold medal	Sarah Burke (CAN)	79.00	23.33	95.33	95.33
Silver medal	Anais Caradeux (FRA)	93.00	35.00	10.66	93.00
Bronze medal	Devin Logan (USA)	90.00	91.33	35.00	91.33
4	Virginie Faivre (SUI)	85.00	86.00	87.00	87.00
5	Keltie Hansen (CAN)	75.00	83.00	77.33	83.00
6	Rosalind Groenewoud (CAN)	80.00	77.66	71.33	80.00
7	Katrien Aerts (BEL)	60.00	62.66	55.00	62.66
8	Mirjam Jaeger (SUI)	53.33	46.00	27.33	53.33

== 2012 results ==
The third Winter X Games Europe edition was held in Tignes (France) from the 14th of March to the 16th of March 2012.

=== Skiing ===
==== Men's Slopestyle Final ====
Rank	Name	Run 1	Run 2	Run 3	Score
Gold medal	Bobby Brown (USA)	94.00	95.00	92.66	95.00
Silver medal	Tom Wallisch (USA)	92.33	56.00	93.33	93.33
Bronze medal	Andreas Håtveit (NOR)	89.00	92.00	32.33	92.00
4	James Woods (UK)	87.00	31.66	91.66	91.66
5	Alex Bellemare (CAN)	91.33	26.00	78.66	91.33
6	Nick Goepper (USA)	79.33	88.33	70.66	88.33
7	Joss Christensen (USA)	75.33	80.33	86.33	86.33
8	Russ Henshaw (AUS)	61.66	67.33	10.00	67.33

==== Women's Slopestyle Final ====
Rank	Name	Run 1	Run 2	Run 3	Score
Gold medal	Kaya Turski (CAN)	90.66	92.66	77.66	92.66
Silver medal	Anna Segal (AUS)	84.66	91.00	88.00	91.00
Bronze medal	Dara Howell (CAN)	88.66	89.66	84.33	89.66
5	Devin Logan (USA)	70.33	88.00	29.66	88.00
5	Emilia Wint (USA)	85.66	87.00	23.66	87.00
6	Eveline Bhend (SUI)	84.00	84.33	82.66	84.33
7	Ashley Battersby (USA)	38.66	76.00	81.33	81.33
8	Keri Herman (USA)	78.00	62.00	44.00	78.00

==== Men's Superpipe Final ====
Rank	Name	Run 1	Run 2	Run 3	Score
Gold medal	Torin Yater-Wallace (USA)	93.00	45.33	95.00	95.00
Silver medal	Thomas Krief (FRA)	87.66	91.66	38.66	91.66
Bronze medal	David Wise (USA)	70.33	90.33	86.66	90.33
4	Justin Dorey (CAN)	65.33	90.00	86.00	90.00
5	Noah Bowman (CAN)	38.33	85.00		85.00
6	Xavier Bertoni (FRA)	81.00	41.33	72.66	81.00
7	Gus Kenworthy (USA)	57.33	37.00	23.33	57.33
8	Matt Margetts (CAN)	23.00	38.00	14.00	38.00

==== Women's Superpipe Final ====
Rank	Name	Run 1	Run 2	Run 3	Score
Gold medal	Rosalind Groenewoud (CAN)	86.66	82.66	89.33	89.33
Silver medal	Devin Logan (USA)	82.00	87.00	87.66	87.66
Bronze medal	Anais Caradeux (FRA)	34.00	18.33	85.00	85.00
4	Virginie Faivre (SUI)	75.66	60.33	81.66	81.66
5	Megan Gunning (CAN)	39.33	21.66	77.00	77.00
6	Maddie Bowman (USA)	75.33	74.33	73.00	75.33
7	Ayana Onozuka (JPN)	73.00	62.00	27.00	73.00
8	Katrien Aerts (BEL)	65.66	58.00	17.66	65.66
