= Freestyle skiing at the 2014 Winter Olympics – Women's slopestyle =

Women's slopestyle at the XXII Olympic Winter Games
- Venue: Rosa Khutor Extreme Park, Krasnaya Polyana, Russia
- Dates: 11 February 2014
- Competitors: 22 from 15 nations
- Winning score: 94.20

Medalists
1st place, gold medalist(s)		Dara Howell	Canada
2nd place, silver medalist(s)		Devin Logan	United States
3rd place, bronze medalist(s)		Kim Lamarre	Canada

The women's slopestyle event in freestyle skiing at the 2014 Winter Olympics in Sochi, Russia took place 11 February 2014. In July 2011 slopestyle was added to the Olympic program, meaning the event made its debut in the 2014 Olympics.

== Qualification ==
An athlete must have placed in the top 30 at a World Cup event after July 2012 or at the 2013 World Championships and a minimum of 50 FIS points. A total of 24 quota spots were available to athletes to compete at the games. A maximum of 4 athletes could be entered by a National Olympic Committee.

Maggie Voisin of the United States and Tiril Sjåstad Christiansen of Norway withdrew with injuries, meaning 22 athletes competed.

== Results ==
=== Qualification ===
The qualification was held at 10:00.

Rank	Bib	Name	Country	Run 1	Run 2	Best	Notes
1	2	Dara Howell	Canada	88.80	35.20	88.80	Q
2	16	Kim Lamarre	Canada	85.40	38.00	85.40	Q
3	12	Katie Summerhayes	Great Britain	81.40	84.00	84.00	Q
4	20	Yuki Tsubota	Canada	76.60	81.00	81.00	Q
5	4	Devin Logan	United States	79.40	80.40	80.40	Q
6	5	Emma Dahlström	Sweden	9.20	79.20	79.20	Q
7	32	Anna Segal	Australia	75.40	78.80	78.80	Q
8	30	Julia Krass	United States	78.40	39.20	78.40	Q
9	11	Eveline Bhend	Switzerland	67.20	77.20	77.20	Q
10	18	Camillia Berra	Switzerland	74.40	74.80	74.80	Q
11	3	Keri Herman	United States	27.40	72.40	72.40	Q
12	6	Silvia Bertagna	Italy	70.60	11.80	70.60	Q
13	8	Dominique Ohaco	Chile	69.60	51.40	69.60	
14	1	Lisa Zimmermann	Germany	20.00	67.20	67.20	
15	26	Anna Willcox-Silfverberg	New Zealand	62.40	34.40	62.40	
16	19	Philomena Bair	Austria	57.60	20.00	57.60	
17	29	Julia Marino	Paraguay	36.40	25.60	36.40	
18	28	Natália Šlepecká	Slovakia	34.60	32.60	34.60	
19	33	Kaya Turski	Canada	14.60	28.00	28.00	
20	13	Zuzana Stromková	Slovakia	24.40	20.20	24.40	
21	31	Anna Mirtova	Russia	17.40	21.60	21.60	
22	27	Chiho Takao	Japan	10.00	8.60	10.00	

=== Final ===
The final was started at 13:00.

Rank	Bib	Name	Country	Run 1	Run 2	Best	Notes
1st place, gold medalist(s)	2	Dara Howell	Canada	94.20	48.40	94.20	
2nd place, silver medalist(s)	4	Devin Logan	United States	85.40	30.00	85.40	
3rd place, bronze medalist(s)	16	Kim Lamarre	Canada	15.00	85.00	85.00	
4	32	Anna Segal	Australia	77.00	28.80	77.00	
5	5	Emma Dahlström	Sweden	72.80	75.40	75.40	
6	20	Yuki Tsubota	Canada	71.60	28.40	71.60	
7	12	Katie Summerhayes	Great Britain	19.40	70.60	70.60	
8	6	Silvia Bertagna	Italy	69.60	21.80	69.60	
9	11	Eveline Bhend	Switzerland	58.40	63.20	63.20	
10	3	Keri Herman	United States	50.00	35.40	50.00	
11	30	Julia Krass	United States	42.40	38.60	42.40	
12	18	Camillia Berra	Switzerland	5.60	30.40	30.40	
