= FIS Freestyle World Ski Championships 2011 – Women's halfpipe =

The women's halfpipe competition of the FIS Freestyle World Ski Championships 2011 was held at Park City Mountain Resort, Park City, Utah, United States on February 5 (qualifying and finals).

== Qualification ==
The following are the results of the qualification.

| Rank | Bib | Name | Country | Run 1 | Run 2 | Best | Notes |
|---|---|---|---|---|---|---|---|
| 1 | 10 | Jen Hudak | United States | 44.30 | 42.90 | 44.30 | Q |
| 2 | 9 | Brita Sigourney | United States | 43.00 | 19.20 | 43.00 | Q |
| 3 | 12 | Keltie Hansen | Canada | 37.40 | 42.70 | 42.70 | Q |
| 4 | 1 | Rosalind Groenewoud | Canada | 41.40 | 37.60 | 41.40 | Q |
| 5 | 11 | Devin Logan | United States | 37.60 | 41.10 | 41.10 | Q |
| 6 | 18 | Sarah Burke | Canada | 39.00 | 37.00 | 39.00 | Q |
| 7 | 3 | Katrien Aerts | Belgium | 34.60 | 35.90 | 35.90 | Q |
| 8 | 19 | Emi Matsuura | Japan | 31.80 | 31.90 | 31.90 | Q |
| 9 | 21 | Emma Lonsdale | United Kingdom | 31.80 | 30.50 | 31.80 | Q |
| 10 | 15 | Anais Caradeux | France | 28.80 | 31.30 | 31.30 | Q |
| 11 | 20 | Mirjam Jaeger | Switzerland | 30.10 | 24.90 | 30.10 | Q |
| 12 | 17 | Manami Mitsuboshi | Japan | 18.90 | 28.40 | 28.40 | Q |
| 13 | 4 | Tiril Sjaastad Christensen | Norway | 27.80 | 14.20 | 27.80 | |
| 14 | 24 | Katie Summerhayes | United Kingdom | 26.00 | 14.60 | 26.00 | |
| 15 | 14 | Jessica Cumming | United States | 24.00 | 23.00 | 24.00 | |
| 16 | 7 | Daniela Bauer | Austria | 21.90 | 22.10 | 22.10 | |
| 17 | 23 | Nina Rusten Andersen | Norway | 17.20 | 20.40 | 20.40 | |
| 18 | 5 | Katia Griffiths | Spain | 19.80 | 7.10 | 19.80 | |
| 19 | 25 | Rose Battersby | New Zealand | 3.00 | 3.70 | 3.70 | |
| | 2 | Virginie Faivre | Switzerland | | | DNS | |
| | 22 | Grete Eliassen | Norway | | | DNS | |
| | 26 | Reyes Santa-Olalla | Spain | | | DNS | |

== Final ==
| Rank | Bib | Name | Country | Run 1 | Run 2 | Best | Notes |
|---|---|---|---|---|---|---|---|
| 1st place, gold medalist(s) | 1 | Rosalind Groenewoud | Canada | 43.90 | 44.70 | 44.70 | |
| 2nd place, silver medalist(s) | 10 | Jen Hudak | United States | 24.80 | 42.10 | 42.10 | |
| 3rd place, bronze medalist(s) | 12 | Keltie Hansen | Canada | 38.80 | 32.0 | 38.80 | |
| 4 | 18 | Sarah Burke | Canada | 37.0 | 38.3 | 38.3 | |
| 5 | 11 | Devin Logan | United States | 19.80 | 35.80 | 35.80 | |
| 6 | 9 | Brita Sigourney | United States | 35.10 | 19.50 | 35.10 | |
| 7 | 20 | Mirjam Jaeger | Switzerland | 33.30 | 34.20 | 34.20 | |
| 8 | 3 | Katrien Aerts | Belgium | 30.80 | 29.40 | 30.80 | |
| 9 | 19 | Emi Matsuura | Japan | 28.90 | 30.20 | 30.20 | |
| 10 | 17 | Manami Mitsuboshi | Japan | 29.50 | 16.60 | 29.50 | |
| 11 | 21 | Emma Lonsdale | United Kingdom | 27.70 | 28.70 | 28.70 | |
| 12 | 15 | Anais Caradeux | France | DNS | DNS | DNS | |
