= Winter X Games XIX =

Held January 2015, Aspen Colorado

Winter X Games XIX (Winter X Games Nineteen)
- Location: (United States) Aspen, Colorado
- Dates: January 21–25

Winter X Games XIX (re-titled Winter X Games Aspen '15; styled as Winter X Games Nineteen in the official logo) were held from January 21 to January 25, 2015, in Aspen, Colorado. They were the 14th consecutive Winter X Games to be held in Aspen. The events were broadcast on ESPN. The games featured participants from the United States, Canada, Norway, Sweden, Japan, New Zealand, France, Switzerland, Italy, and Australia.

Participating athletes competed in six Skiing events, eight Snowboarding events, and five Snowmobiling events. There was also a Counter-Strike: Global Offensive exhibition tournament organized by Major League Gaming. The United States won 31 of 57 medals awarded, with nine other countries medalling.

== Chronology of events ==
=== Day one ===
The games began on Wednesday, January 21 with the first event, the Women's Ski Superpipe. American Maddie Bowman came in first place with a score of 85.66. Japanese skier Ayana Onozuka placed second and American skier Brita Sigourney placed third.

=== Day two ===
The second day began with three qualifying events, the Men's Snowboarder X Qualifying, Women's Snowboarder X Qualifying, and the Snowboarder X Adaptive Qualifying.

The afternoon consisted of the Mono Skier X Final. In the Mono Skier Final, American Chris Devlin-Young came in first place and Brandon Adam came in second.

In the evening, the Men's Snowboard SuperPipe Final, Snowmobile Speed & Style Final, and the Men's Snowboard SuperPipe Final were held. American Colten Moore won the Snowmobile Speed & Style Final, with Joe Parsons placing second and Cory Davis placing third. In the Snowboard SuperPipe Final, American snowboarder Danny Davis placed first, Japanese snowboarder Taku Hiraoka placed second, and Russian Iouri Podladtchikov placed third.

=== Day three ===
The third day began with the Men's and Women's Snowboarder X Quarterfinal, Semifinal, and Final. In the men's final, Canadian Kevin Hill came in first place followed by Italian Omar Visintin and American Nate Holland. In the women's final, American Lindsey Jacobellis came in first place, with Canadian Dominique Maltais placing second and French Nelly Moenne Loccoz placing third.

The afternoon consisted of the Snowboarder X Adaptive semi finals and finals. American Keith Gabel came in first place, with New Zealand Carl Murphy coming in second and Canadian Alex Massie coming in third.

The evening consisted of the Snowboard Big Air final. Canadian Mark McMorris placed first, followed by Canadian Maxence Parrot and Japanese Yuki Kadono. The day ended with the Snowmobile Long Jump. American Heath Frisby won the event. Cory Davis came in second and Colten Moore came in third place.

=== Day four ===
The fourth day began with the Men's Ski Slopestyle final in the morning, followed by the Women's Ski Slopestyle final in the afternoon. In the men's final, Nick Goepper came in first, Joss Christensen came in second, and Alex Bellemare came in third place. In the women's final, Swedish Emma Dahlström placed first. American Keri Herman came in second place followed by Canadian Dara Howell in third place.

Also in the afternoon was the Snowmobile Hillcross Quarterfinal, Semifinal, and Final. American Ryan Simon came in first place, followed by American Justin Thomas in second and Justin Titus in third.

The evening events consisted of the Women's Snowboard SuperPipe final and the Ski Big Air final. In the Women's SuperPipe final, fourteen-year-old American snowboarder Chloe Kim came in first place, making her the youngest person to ever win gold at the Winter X Games. American Kelly Clark took second place and Australian Torah Bright took third place.

In the Ski Big Air final, Canadian Vincent Gagnier came in first place, followed by American Bobby Brown in second and Swiss Elias Ambühl in third place.

=== Day five ===
The fifth day was the final day of events for the 2015 Winter X Games, starting off with the Women's Snowboard Slopestyle Final in the morning. Norwegian Silje Norendal came in first place, with American Jamie Anderson coming in second and New Zealand Christy Prior coming in third place. American skier Nick Goepper won the Slopestyle final, with American Joss Christensen placing second.

At midday was the Snowmobile SnoCross Adaptive Final. American Garrett Goodwin placed first, followed by American Doug Henry in second and American Jim Wazny in third place.

The final event of the games was the Men's Ski SuperPipe Final. Canadian Simon d'Artois came in first place, French Kevin Rolland came in second place, and American Alex Ferreira came in third place.

== Results ==
=== Medal count ===
* Host nation (United States)

| Rank | Nation | Gold | Silver | Bronze | Total |
|---|---|---|---|---|---|
| 1 | United States (USA)* | 11 | 11 | 9 | 31 |
| 2 | Canada (CAN) | 6 | 2 | 3 | 11 |
| 3 | Norway (NOR) | 1 | 1 | 0 | 2 |
| 4 | Sweden (SWE) | 1 | 0 | 1 | 2 |
| 5 | Japan (JPN) | 0 | 2 | 1 | 3 |
| 6 | France (FRA) | 0 | 1 | 1 | 2 |
| 6 | New Zealand (NZL) | 0 | 1 | 1 | 2 |
| 8 | Italy (ITA) | 0 | 1 | 0 | 1 |
| 9 | Switzerland (SUI) | 0 | 0 | 2 | 2 |
| 10 | Australia (AUS) | 0 | 0 | 1 | 1 |
| Totals (10 entries) | | 19 | 19 | 19 | 57 |

=== Skiing ===
==== Women's SuperPipe results ====
| Rank | Name | Run 1 | Run 2 | Run 3 | Best Score |
|---|---|---|---|---|---|
| Gold medal | Maddie Bowman (USA) | 85.00 | 78.00 | 85.66 | 85.66 |
| Silver medal | Ayana Onozuka (JPN) | 80.00 | 62.33 | 83.33 | 83.33 |
| Bronze medal | Brita Sigourney (USA) | 77.00 | 78.66 | 30.33 | 78.66 |
| 4 | Angeli Vanlaanen (USA) | 69.66 | 23.00 | 11.66 | 69.66 |
| 5 | Janina Kuzma (NZ) | 60.33 | 66.66 | 60.00 | 66.66 |
| 6 | Annalisa Drew (USA) | 17.66 | 46.66 | 66.00 | 66.00 |
| 7 | Marie Martinod (FRA) | 65.33 | 9.33 | 65.66 | 65.66 |
| 8 | Rosalind Groenewoud (CAN) | 27.33 | - | - | 27.33 |

==== Men's SuperPipe results ====
| Rank | Name | Run 1 | Run 2 | Run 3 | Best Score |
|---|---|---|---|---|---|
| Gold medal | Simon d'Artois (CAN) | 90.33 | 87.66 | 93.00 | 93.00 |
| Silver medal | Kevin Rolland (FRA) | 19.00 | 85.00 | 92.33 | 92.33 |
| Bronze medal | Alex Ferreira (USA) | 42.33 | 39.33 | 91.66 | 91.66 |
| 4 | David Wise (USA) | 41.00 | 69.66 | 89.00 | 89.00 |
| 5 | Gus Kenworthy (USA) | 88.00 | 85.66 | 34.33 | 88.00 |
| 6 | Noah Bowman (CAN) | 31.33 | 80.00 | 86.33 | 86.33 |
| 7 | Lyman Currier (USA) | 83.33 | 56.66 | 79.66 | 83.33 |
| 8 | Mike Riddle (CAN) | 78.33 | 31.00 | 10.00 | 78.33 |

==== Men's Big Air results ====
| Rank | Name | Score |
|---|---|---|
| Gold medal | Vincent Gagnier (CAN) | 91 |
| Silver medal | Bobby Brown (USA) | 82 |
| Bronze medal | Elias Ambühl (SUI) | 82 |
| 4 | Kai Mahler (SUI) | 78 |
| 5 | Jesper Tjader (SWE) | 72 |
| 6 | Alex Schlopy (USA) | 14 |

==== Men's SlopeStyle results ====
| Rank | Name | Run 1 | Run 2 | Run 3 | Best Score |
|---|---|---|---|---|---|
| Gold medal | Nick Goepper (USA) | 93.66 | 33.00 | 80.66 | 93.66 |
| Silver medal | Joss Christensen (USA) | 90.66 | 89.00 | 20.33 | 90.66 |
| Bronze medal | Alex Bellemare (CAN) | 83.00 | 85.66 | 31.33 | 85.66 |
| 4 | Bobby Brown (USA) | 14.33 | 32.33 | 75.00 | 75.00 |
| 5 | James Woods (GBR) | 20.00 | 72.66 | 65.33 | 72.66 |
| 6 | Tom Wallisch (USA) | 14.66 | 70.00 | 21.00 | 70.00 |
| 7 | Gus Kenworthy (USA) | 30.33 | 34.00 | 57.00 | 57.00 |
| 8 | Henrik Harlaut (SWE) | 22.66 | - | - | 22.66 |

==== Women's SlopeStyle results ====
| Rank | Name | Run 1 | Run 2 | Run 3 | Best Score |
|---|---|---|---|---|---|
| Gold medal | Emma Dahlström (SWE) | 82.66 | 90.33 | 35.00 | 90.33 |
| Silver medal | Keri Herman (USA) | 86.66 | 60.33 | 10.33 | 86.66 |
| Bronze medal | Dara Howell (CAN) | 78.66 | 17.66 | 82.00 | 82.00 |
| 4 | Devin Logan (USA) | 80.33 | 52.00 | 81.00 | 81.00 |
| 5 | Julia Krass (USA) | 15.00 | 79.00 | 34.33 | 79.00 |
| 6 | Nikki Blackall (CAN) | 23.00 | 64.66 | 61.33 | 64.66 |
| 7 | Anouk Purnelle-Faniel (CAN) | 18.00 | 29.33 | 57.00 | 57.00 |
| 8 | Darian Stevens (USA) | 28.00 | - | - | 28.00 |

==== Men's Mono Skier X results ====
| Rank | Name | Time |
|---|---|---|
| Gold medal | Chris Devlin-Young (USA) | 1:03.246 |
| Silver medal | Brandon Adam (USA) | 1:06.864 |
| Bronze medal | Ravi Drugan (USA) | 1:11.600 |
| 4 | Kevin Lindner (GER) | 16:39.999 |

=== Snowboarding ===
==== Men's Snowboarder X results ====
| Rank | Name | Time |
|---|---|---|
| Gold medal | Kevin Hill (CAN) | 0:50.036 |
| Silver medal | Omar Visintin (ITA) | 0:51.280 |
| Bronze medal | Nate Holland (USA) | 0:52.122 |
| 4 | Nick Baumgartner (USA) | 0:52.356 |
| 5 | Konstantin Schad (GER) | 0:54.909 |
| 6 | Max Schairer (AUT) | 0:56.536 |

==== Women's Snowboarder X results ====
| Rank | Name | Time |
|---|---|---|
| Gold medal | Lindsey Jacobellis (USA) | 0:53.085 |
| Silver medal | Dominique Maltais (CAN) | 0:53.234 |
| Bronze medal | Nelly Moenne Loccoz (FRA) | 0:53.384 |
| 4 | Belle Brockhoff (AUS) | 0:53.544 |
| 5 | Michela Moioli (ITA) | 0:53.711 |
| 6 | Eva Samková (CZE) | 1:06.799 |

==== Men's Snowboard X Adaptive results ====
| Rank | Name | Time |
|---|---|---|
| Gold medal | Keith Gabel (USA) | 0:57.168 |
| Silver medal | Carl Murphy (NZ) | 0:57.449 |
| Bronze medal | Alex Massie (CAN) | 1:01.295 |
| 4 | John Leslie (CAN) | 1:08.865 |
| 5 | Mike Shea (USA) | 1:08.865 |
| 6 | Matti Suur-Hamari (FIN) | 1:10.495 |

==== Men's Big Air results ====
| Rank | Name | Score |
|---|---|---|
| Gold medal | Mark McMorris (CAN) | 88 |
| Silver medal | Max Parrot (CAN) | 82 |
| Bronze medal | Yuki Kadono (JPN) | 66 |
| 4 | Sven Thorgren (SWE) | 58 |
| 5 | Ståle Sandbech (NOR) | 40 |
| 6 | Torstein Horgmo (NOR) | 19 |

==== Men's Slopestyle results ====
| Rank | Name | Run 1 | Run 2 | Run 3 | Best Score |
|---|---|---|---|---|---|
| Gold medal | Mark McMorris (CAN) | 51.00 | 96.00 | 29.00 | 96.00 |
| Silver medal | Ståle Sandbech (NOR) | 95.00 | 15.00 | 34.66 | 95.00 |
| Bronze medal | Sven Thorgren (SWE) | 92.00 | 39.33 | 37.66 | 92.00 |
| 4 | Sebastien Toutant (CAN) | 33.33 | 87.33 | 35.00 | 87.33 |
| 5 | Sage Kotsenburg (USA) | 83.33 | 42.66 | 67.66 | 83.33 |
| 6 | Torstein Horgmo (NOR) | 44.66 | 49.33 | 57.00 | 57.00 |
| 7 | Emil Ulsletten (NOR) | 35.33 | 47.33 | 29.33 | 47.33 |
| 8 | Nikolas Baden (USA) | 32.33 | 36.33 | 40.33 | 40.33 |

==== Women's Slopestyle results ====
| Rank | Name | Run 1 | Run 2 | Run 3 | Best Score |
|---|---|---|---|---|---|
| Gold medal | Silje Norendal (NOR) | 90.66 | 90.33 | 93.66 | 93.66 |
| Silver medal | Jamie Anderson (USA) | 85.00 | 91.33 | 36.33 | 91.33 |
| Bronze medal | Christy Prior (NZ) | 39.66 | 14.00 | 89.33 | 89.33 |
| 4 | Spencer O'Brien (CAN) | 54.00 | 87.33 | 13.33 | 87.33 |
| 5 | Kjersti Buaas (NOR) | 13.66 | 28.00 | 80.00 | 80.00 |
| 6 | Enni Rukajarvi (FIN) | 71.33 | 43.33 | 41.00 | 71.33 |
| 7 | Cheryl Maas (NED) | 30.00 | 22.66 | 46.66 | 46.66 |
| 8 | Anna Gasser (AUT) | 28.66 | 46.33 | - | 46.33 |

==== Women's SuperPipe results ====
| Rank | Name | Run 1 | Run 2 | Run 3 | Best Score |
|---|---|---|---|---|---|
| Gold medal | Chloe Kim (USA) | 81.66 | 87.66 | 92.00 | 92.00 |
| Silver medal | Kelly Clark (USA) | 90.00 | 39.00 | 42.33 | 90.00 |
| Bronze medal | Torah Bright (AUS) | 78.33 | 19.33 | 5.00 | 78.33 |
| 4 | Arielle Gold (USA) | 73.33 | 75.66 | 73.00 | 75.66 |
| 5 | Cai Xuetong (CHN) | 47.00 | 11.00 | 70.00 | 70.00 |
| 6 | Queralt Castellet (SPA) | 60.00 | 50.00 | 10.33 | 60.00 |
| 7 | Hannah Teter (USA) | 51.00 | 48.00 | 10.66 | 51.00 |
| 8 | Elena Hight (USA) | 21.66 | 46.00 | 32.00 | 46.00 |

==== Men's SuperPipe results ====
| Rank | Name | Run 1 | Run 2 | Run 3 | Best Score |
|---|---|---|---|---|---|
| Gold medal | Danny Davis (USA) | 80.00 | 64.33 | 93.66 | 93.66 |
| Silver medal | Taku Hiraoka (JPN) | 84.33 | 14.33 | 92.33 | 92.33 |
| Bronze medal | Iouri Podladtchikov (SUI) | 89.00 | 67.66 | 40.00 | 89.00 |
| 4 | Shaun White (USA) | 54.00 | 82.00 | 62.66 | 82.00 |
| 5 | David Habluetzel (SUI) | 61.00 | 79.00 | 62.66 | 79.00 |
| 6 | Ayumu Hirano (JPN) | 77.66 | 70.00 | 24.33 | 77.66 |
| 7 | Zhang Yiwei (CHN) | 40.00 | 12.00 | 75.00 | 75.00 |
| 8 | Gabe Ferguson (USA) | 73.00 | 30.33 | 57.00 | 73.00 |

=== Snowmobiling ===
==== Speed & Style results ====
| Rank | Name | Score |
|---|---|---|
| Gold medal | Colten Moore (USA) | 90.62 |
| Silver medal | Joe Parsons (USA) | 83.00 |
| Bronze medal | Cory Davis (USA) | 84.33 |
| 4 | Levi LaVallee (USA) | 50.01 |

==== Long Jump results ====
| Rank | Name | Distance |
|---|---|---|
| Gold medal | Heath Frisby (USA) | 164'11" |
| Silver medal | Cory Davis (USA) | 160'5" |
| Bronze medal | Colten Moore (USA) | 157'4" |
| 4 | Kyle Pallin (USA) | 143'9" |
| 5 | Joe Parsons (USA) | 129'10" |
| 6 | Chris Burandt (USA) | 92'1" |

==== SnoCross Adaptive results ====
| Rank | Name | Time |
|---|---|---|
| Gold medal | Garrett Goodwin (USA) | 6:25.099 |
| Silver medal | Doug Henry (USA) | 6:31.947 |
| Bronze medal | Jim Wazny (USA) | 6:47.128 |
| 4 | Jeff Tweet (USA) | 6:51.886 |
| 5 | E.J. Poplawski (USA) | 6:58.689 |
| 6 | Chris Heppding (USA) | 6:59.594 |
| 7 | Bryan Hatch (USA) | 6:59.822 |

==== SnoCross results ====
| Rank | Name | Time |
|---|---|---|
| Gold medal | Tucker Hibbert (USA) | 14:41.084 |
| Silver medal | Kody Kamm (USA) | 15:01.747 |
| Bronze medal | Ross Martin (USA) | 15:08.593 |
| 4 | Adam Renheim (SWE) | 15:30.703 |
| 5 | Justin Broberg (USA) | 14:50.457 |
| 6 | Tim Tremblay (CAN) | 14:55.196 |
| 7 | Dave Joanis (CAN) | 14:58.989 |
| 8 | Colby Crapo (USA) | 15:12.930 |
| 9 | Corin Todd (USA) | 15:25.487 |
| 10 | John Stenberg (USA) | 16:39.999 |

==== HillCross results ====
| Rank | Name | Time |
|---|---|---|
| Gold medal | Ryan Simons (CAN) | 0:57.154 |
| Silver medal | Justin Thomas (USA) | 0:59.074 |
| Bronze medal | Nathan Titus (USA) | 1:02.591 |
| 4 | Jason Fox (USA) | 1:06.400 |
| 5 | Dolan Phelps (USA) | 1:08.511 |
| 6 | David Sharp Jr. (USA) | 1:10.882 |
