= Yuki Kadono =

Japanese snowboarder

Personal information
- Native name: 角野 友基
- Born: 18 May 1996 (age 30) Miki, Japan
- Height: 5 ft 8 in (173 cm)
- Weight: 141 lb (64 kg)

Sport
- Country: Japan
- Sport: Snowboarding
- Event: Slopestyle
- Team: Japan (2014)

Achievements and titles
- Olympic finals: 2014
Medal record
Men's snowboarding
Representing Japan
Winter X Games
Silver medal – second place	2014 Aspen	Big Air
Bronze medal – third place	2015 Aspen	Big Air
Bronze medal – third place	2016 Aspen	Big Air
Gold medal – first place	2016 Oslo	Big Air
Bronze medal – third place	2018 Aspen	Big Air
Bronze medal – third place	2019 Oslo	Big Air

Yuki Kadono (角野 友基, Kadono Yūki; born May 18, 1996) is a Japanese snowboarder who competes in the slopestyle event.

Born in Miki, Hyōgo, Japan, he competed for Japan at the 2014 Winter Olympics in Sochi, qualifying for the final of the slopestyle event and finishing 8th overall.

Kadono won the Nokia Air and Style in Beijing in 2012, at the age of 16, making him one of the youngest to win the event besides Shaun White. He was the 2012–13 overall World Cup Champion in the slopestyle event.

Kadono placed 3rd in Big Air at the 2015 X Games in Aspen and first at the 2016 X games in Oslo. He won the 2015 Burton US Open Slopestyle with the first ever Back-To-Back Triple Cork 1620s.

Despite being considered a medal contender by observers including Tyler Nicholson and Transworld Snowboarding, Kadono was not selected for the 2018 Winter Olympics, with reports indicating that this was due to a code of conduct violation.

In 2020, he won his second Burton US Open Slopestyle victory.
