= FIM Snowcross World Championship =

Snowmobile racing series

- Category: Snowmobile racing
- Country: International
- Inaugural season: 2004
- Riders' champion: (Norway) Magnus Reiten

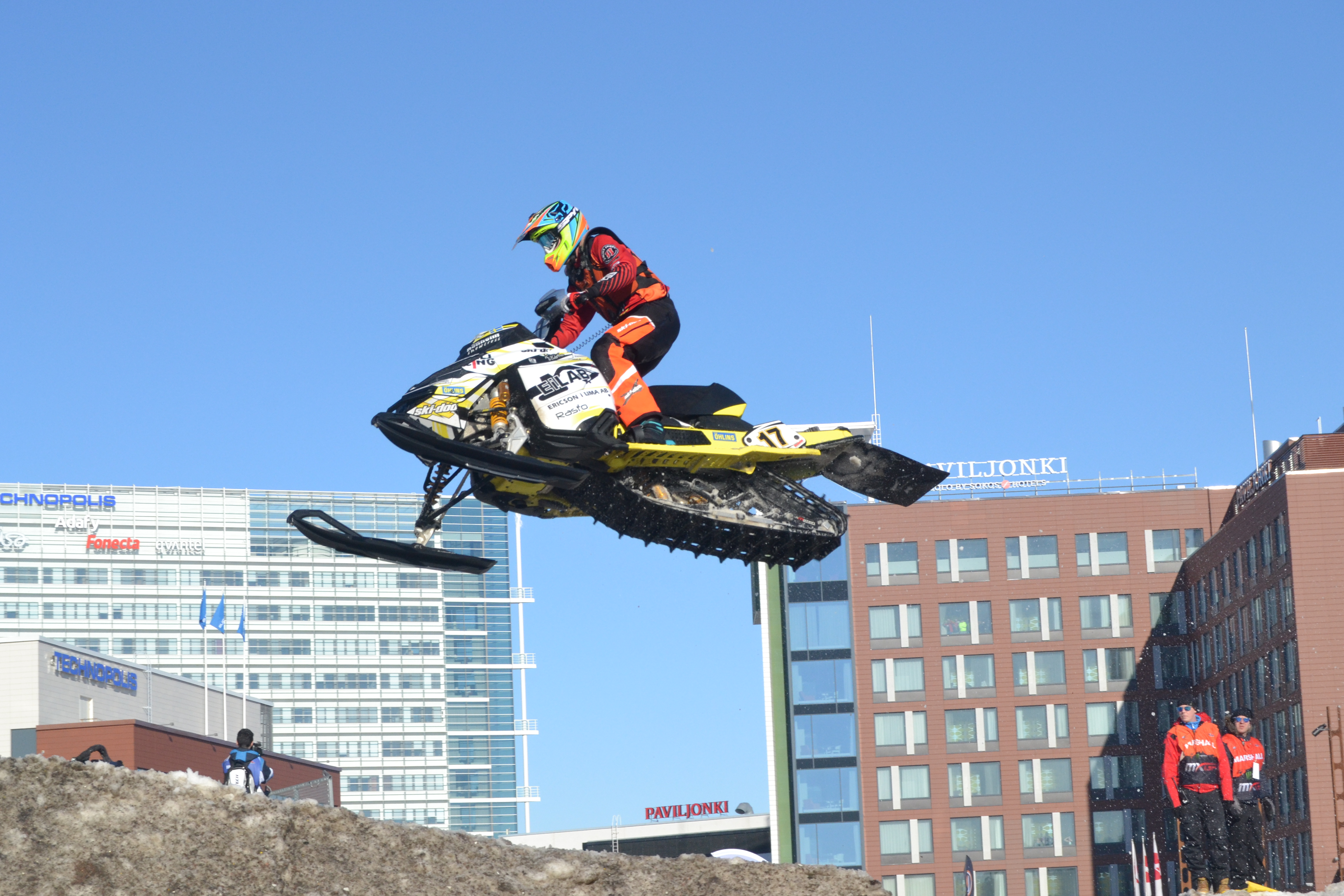
Adam Renheim at 2016 Snowcross World Championship in Jyväskylä

The FIM Snowcross World Championship is a racing series held annually by the International Motorcycling Federation (FIM) since 2004. It replaced the Snowcross World Cup, which was held in 2002 and 2003. Finnish rider Janne Tapio won both of these Cups.

From 2004 to 2009, the championship consisted of several stages (from three to four), each of which could include one or two races. The longest championship in terms of the number of races was in 2007 (four stages, eight races). Since 2010, the championship has consisted of two races within a single stage, except for 2016, which included two stages. The championship was not held in 2020 due to restrictions related to the COVID-19 pandemic.

Over the years, the World Championship stages have been hosted by Sweden (2004-2005, 2007-2010, 2014-2015, 2017, 2019), Finland (2004-2006, 2008, 2011, 2013, 2016, 2018, 2021, 2024), Norway (2004-2009, 2016, 2023-2024), Switzerland (2006-2007), Italy (2009), Russia (2012), and Turkey (2024). Turkey was supposed to host the championship in 2023, but due to an earthquake, the competition was moved to Norway, and the stage in Turkey was rescheduled for 2024.

== FIM Women's Snowcross World Championship ==
From 2014 to 2023, under the auspices of the FIM, the FIM Women's Snowcross World Cup took place, except for 2020 and 2022, which were skipped due to COVID-19 restrictions. All Cup events consisted of one or two stages, including 1 or 2 races. Cup stages were held in Sweden (2014-2015, 2017, 2019), Finland (2016, 2018, 2021), and Norway (2016, 2023).

In 2024, the Cup was elevated to Championship status. The inaugural FIM Women's Snowcross World Championship comprised four races held in Finland and Norway.

== Weekend format ==
A standard championship weekend consists of several sessions:

- Free practice lasting 20 minutes. There may be one session (if there are 30 or fewer pilots registered) or two sessions (if there are more than 30 pilots).
- Qualifying heats lasting 5 minutes. There can be from four to eight heats depending on the number of pilots. Each qualifying heat can have no more than 15 pilots. Based on the qualifying results, the top 10 pilots with the best times earn points.
- Last chance heat. An 8-minute qualifying heat for pilots who did not advance in the main qualifying session. Up to 16 pilots can participate, with some of them potentially advancing to the race.
- Warm-up session lasting 10 minutes.
- Two final races. Points are awarded independently for each race.

== Points Scoring System ==
The points scoring system in the World Championship has remained unchanged since the inception of the first World Cup in 2002 until the 2023 season, and it was the same for both the overall and women's championships. Points were awarded to the top 20 pilots regardless of whether they finished the race or not.

Position	1	2	3	4	5	6	7	8	9	10	11	12	13	14	15	16	17	18	19	20
Points	25	22	20	18	16	15	14	13	12	11	10	9	8	7	6	5	4	3	2	1

Starting from 2024, points are awarded to the top 16 pilots according to the following system:

Position	1	2	3	4	5	6	7	8	9	10	11	12	13	14	15	16
Points	25	22	20	18	16	15	14	13	12	11	10	9	8	7	6	5

Also, starting from 2024, points are awarded to the top ten pilots who achieve the highest positions in the qualifying heats. During the weekend, two qualifying heats are held, with two different groups of pilots participating in each heat. The times recorded by them are then compiled into a single table.

Position	1	2	3	4	5	6	7	8	9	10
Points	10	9	8	7	6	5	4	3	2	1

Thus, during one weekend, a pilot can accumulate a maximum of 60 points (if they are the fastest in the qualifying heats and then win both races).

== Winners and podium finishers of the FIM Snowcross World Cup & Championship ==
Season	Number of races	Champion	Silver	Bronze
2002 (cup)	3	Janne Tapio (FIN)	Thomas Åberg (SWE)	Janne Jurvelin (FIN)
2003 (cup)	1	Janne Tapio (FIN)	Thomas Åberg (SWE)	Janne Jurvelin (FIN)
2004	3	Janne Tapio (FIN)	Thomas Åberg (SWE)	Johan Eriksson (SWE)
2005	3	Janne Tapio (FIN)	Daniel Olofsson (SWE)	Peter Ericson (SWE)
2006	4	Peter Ericson (SWE)	Janne Tapio (FIN)	Johan Eriksson (SWE)
2007	8	Peter Ericson (SWE)	Johan Eriksson (SWE)	Viktor Stenman (SWE)
2008	6	Emil Öhman (SWE)	Viktor Stenman (SWE)	Niko Korsumaeki (FIN)
2009	6	Peter Ericson (SWE)	Emil Öhman (SWE)	Niko Korsumaeki (FIN)
2010	3	Tucker Hibbert (USA)	Johan Lidman (SWE)	Cory Davis (USA)
2011	3	Emil Öhman (SWE)	Petter Nårsa (SWE)	Tucker Hibbert (USA)
2012	3	Tucker Hibbert (USA)	Petter Nårsa (SWE)	Adam Renheim (SWE)
2013	3	Adam Renheim (SWE)	Petter Nårsa (SWE)	Logan Christian (USA)
2014	1	Adam Renheim (SWE)	Emil Öhman (SWE)	Nisse Kjellström (SWE)
2015	1	Marcus Ogerman-Hellgren (SWE)	Nisse Kjellström (SWE)	Filip Eriksson (SWE)
2016	2	Adam Renheim (SWE)	Aki Pihlaja (FIN)	Nisse Kjellström (SWE)
2017	2	Adam Renheim (SWE)	Aki Pihlaja (FIN)	Elias Ishoel (NOR)
2018	2	Adam Renheim (SWE)	Aki Pihlaja (FIN)	Nisse Kjellström (SWE)
2019	2	Adam Renheim (SWE)	Aki Pihlaja (FIN)	Oskar Norum (FIN)
2020	The season is canceled due to the COVID-19 pandemic			
2021	2	Petter Nårsa (SWE)	John Stenberg (SWE)	Emil Hansson (SWE)
2022	The season is canceled due to the COVID-19 pandemic			
2023	2	Aki Pihlaja (FIN)	Elias Ishoel (NOR)	Gustav Sahlsten (SWE)
2024	3	Magnus Reiten (NOR)	Jesse Kirchmeyer (USA)	Aki Pihlaja (FIN)
2025	3	Elias Ishoel (NOR)	Aki Pihlaja (FIN)	Mille Andersson (SWE)
2026	3	Aki Pihlaja (FIN)	Olle Sahlström (SWE)	Topi Rinne (FIN)

== Winners and podium finishers of the FIM Snowcross Women's World Cup & Championship ==
Season	Number of races	Champion	Silver	Bronze	4th	5th
2014 (cup)	1	Elina Öhman (SWE)	Signe Irene Bråten (NOR)	Malene Andersen (NOR)	Viktoria Kirkhus (NOR)	Matilda Johansson (SWE)
2015 (cup)	1	Elina Öhman (SWE)	Ronja Revelj (SWE)	Emilia Dahlgren (SWE)	Linn Sjöberg (FIN)	Viktoria Kirkhus (NOR)
2016 (cup)	2	Marica Renheim (SWE)	Emilia Dahlgren (SWE)	Malene Andersen (NOR)	Matilda Johansson (SWE)	Viktoria Kirkhus (NOR)
2017 (cup)	1	Elina Öhman (SWE)	Emilia Dahlgren (SWE)	Ronja Renheim (SWE)	Elvira Lindh (SWE)	Fanny Vikström (SWE)
2018 (cup)	2	Marica Renheim (SWE)	Malene Andersen (NOR)	Emilia Dahlgren (SWE)	Fanny Vikström (SWE)	Matilda Johansson (SWE)
2019 (cup)	2	Elina Öhman (SWE)	Malene Andersen (NOR)	Ellen Bäcke (SWE)	Fanny Vikström (SWE)	Matilda Norberg (SWE)
2020	The season is canceled due to the COVID-19 pandemic					
2021 (cup)	2	Hilda Arnesson (SWE)	Thea Arnesson (SWE)	Hilda Öhman (SWE)	Jenny Lundström (SWE)	Matilda Johansson (SWE)
2022	The season is canceled due to the COVID-19 pandemic					
2023 (cup)	2	Malene Cottew^{1} (NOR)	Hilda Öhman (SWE)	Thea Arnesson (SWE)	Wilma Jonsson (SWE)	Ida Rosell (SWE)
2024	4	Malene Cottew (NOR)	Jenny Lundström (SWE)	Wilma Jonsson (SWE)	Saga Forsell (FIN)	Emma Laamanen (FIN)
2025	3	Saga Forsell (FIN)	Wilma Jonsson (SWE)	Emma Laamanen (FIN)	Tilde Karelius (SWE)	Victoria Laine (FIN)
2026	3	Wilma Jonsson (SWE)	Mali Hoelsaeter (NOR)	Tilde Karelius (SWE)	Emma Laamanen (NOR)	Kelly Collier (USA)

^{1}In February 2021, Malen Andersen married the pilot Cole Cottew and, starting from the 2023 season, competes under the surname Cottew..
