= FIS Freestyle Ski and Snowboarding World Championships 2015 – Women's ski halfpipe =

The women's ski halfpipe competition of the FIS Freestyle Ski and Snowboarding World Championships 2015 was held at Kreischberg, Austria on January 21 (qualifying) and January 22 (finals). 13 athletes from 8 countries competed.

== Qualification ==
The following are the results of the qualification.

Rank	Bib	Name	Country	Run 1	Run 2	Best	Notes
1	1	Virginie Faivre	Switzerland	76.00	77.20	77.20	Q
2	10	Cassie Sharpe	Canada	71.20	75.40	75.40	Q
3	4	Anaïs Caradeux	France	73.80	74.00	74.00	Q
4	6	Keltie Hansen	Canada	33.20	73.00	73.00	Q
5	2	Mirjam Jäger	Switzerland	21.60	70.80	70.80	Q
6	5	Sabrina Cakmakli	Germany	13.40	70.40	70.40	Q
7	3	Katrien Aerts	Belgium	61.80	70.00	70.00	
8	12	Zyre Austin	United States	66.60	69.20	69.20	
9	11	Megan Warrener	Canada	68.00	67.80	68.00	
10	9	Jeanee Crane-Mauzy	United States	64.40	59.60	64.40	
11	13	Molly Summerhayes	Great Britain	58.60	57.00	58.60	
12	7	Elizavetta Chesnokova	Russia	15.00	48.20	48.20	
13	8	Jamie Crane-Mauzy	United States	31.80	27.80	31.80	

== Final ==
The following are the results of the finals.

Rank	Bib	Name	Country	Run 1	Run 2	Run 3	Best
1st place, gold medalist(s)	1	Virginie Faivre	Switzerland	83.80	56.60	74.20	83.80
2nd place, silver medalist(s)	10	Cassie Sharpe	Canada	68.60	75.40	81.00	81.00
3rd place, bronze medalist(s)	2	Mirjam Jäger	Switzerland	78.40	79.80	65.60	79.80
4	4	Anaïs Caradeux	France	53.80	78.00	22.20	78.00
5	5	Sabrina Cakmakli	Germany	73.60	76.00	70.00	76.00
6	6	Keltie Hansen	Canada	60.40	37.80	54.40	60.40
