= FIS Freestyle Ski and Snowboarding World Championships 2015 – Women's ski slopestyle =

The women's ski slopestyle competition of the FIS Freestyle Ski and Snowboarding World Championships 2015 was held at Kreischberg, Austria on January 20 (qualifying) and January 21 (finals). 15 athletes from 10 countries competed.

== Qualification ==
The following are the results of the qualification.

Rank	Bib	Name	Country	Run 1	Run 2	Best	Notes
1	1	Lisa Zimmermann	Germany	33.80	87.80	87.80	Q
2	2	Katie Summerhayes	Great Britain	85.00	6.00	85.00	Q
3	7	Zuzana Stromkova	Slovakia	81.80	73.20	81.80	Q
4	6	Yuki Tsubota	Canada	79.00	19.00	79.00	Q
5	4	Silvia Bertagna	Italy	49.20	76.60	76.60	Q
6	16	Vilde Johansen	Norway	73.20	63.20	73.20	Q
7	15	Giulia Tanno	Switzerland	27.60	72.00	72.00	
8	13	Johanne Killi	Norway	71.60	60.20	71.60	
9	17	Shondra Charbonneau	Canada	35.60	71.00	71.00	
10	12	Coline Ballet Baz	France	69.40	21.20	69.40	
11	18	Nadia Gonzales	United States	66.40	60.60	66.40	
12	9	Sabrina Cakmakli	Germany	62.40	48.60	62.40	
13	14	Jamie Crane-Mauzy	United States	20.80	53.40	53.40	
14	11	Regina Rathgeb	Austria	17.60	18.80	18.80	
15	8	Giorgia Bertoncini	Italy	13.80	DNS	13.80	

== Final ==
The following are the results of the finals.

Rank	Bib	Name	Country	Run 1	Run 2	Run 3	Best
1st place, gold medalist(s)	1	Lisa Zimmermann	Germany	39.00	85.80	40.00	85.80
2nd place, silver medalist(s)	2	Katie Summerhayes	Great Britain	61.60	81.40	82.80	82.80
3rd place, bronze medalist(s)	7	Zuzana Stromkova	Slovakia	69.20	77.60	64.80	77.60
4	16	Vilde Johansen	Norway	74.40	66.20	76.00	76.00
5	4	Silvia Bertagna	Italy	70.60	66.00	73.20	73.20
6	6	Yuki Tsubota	Canada				DNS
