= Jerome Elbrycht =

French freestyle skier

Medal record
Men's Freestyle skiing
Representing France
Winter X Games
Gold medal – first place	2016 Aspen	Mono Skier X

Jerome Elbrycht is a French freestyle skier and cable park wakeboarder.

Elbrycht competed at the Winter X Games XX in Aspen, Colorado in January 2016, where he won a gold medal in Mono Skier X.
