= Isabel Atkin =

British-American freestyle skier

Personal information
- Nationality: American, British
- Born: 21 June 1998 (age 28) Boston, Massachusetts, U.S.
- Height: 1.71 m (5 ft 7 in)
- Weight: 66 kg (146 lb)

Sport
- Country: Great Britain
- Sport: Freestyle skiing
- Events: Slopestyle, Big air
Medal record
Women's freestyle skiing
Representing Great Britain
Olympic Games
Bronze medal – third place	2018 Pyeongchang	Slopestyle
World Championships
Bronze medal – third place	2017 Sierra Nevada	Slopestyle
Bronze medal – third place	2019 Utah	Big air
Winter X Games
Silver medal – second place	2018 Aspen	Slopestyle
Silver medal – second place	2021 Aspen	Slopestyle

Isabel Atkin (born 21 June 1998) is a former British-American freestyle skier who competed internationally for Great Britain. She won bronze in women's slopestyle at the 2018 Winter Olympics in Pyeongchang, the first British Olympic medal in skiing.

== Early life ==
Atkin was born in Boston, United States, to an English father, Mike, and a Malaysian Chinese mother, Winnie. Her younger sister is Zoe Atkin, who is also an Olympic-bronze medalist freestyle skier. She started learning to ski on Sugarloaf Mountain in Maine when she was three. In order to help with her skiing, her family moved to Park City, Utah when she was 14 to attend the Winter Sports School whose academic calendar runs from April to November so that she may ski in the winter. She enrolled at Colorado College in 2017, graduating in 2022.

== Career ==
Atkin has dual British and US nationality, and decided to join the GB Park & Pipe programme, and started competing for Great Britain when she was 15 during the 2013–2014 season.

In 2017, she competed in the ski slopestyle World Cup competition at Silvaplana, and became the first British woman to win a World Cup event in ski slopestyle. She competed at the FIS Freestyle Ski and Snowboarding World Championships 2017 in Sierra Nevada, Spain, where she won bronze in slopestyle. At the 2017 Dew Tour in Breckenridge, Colorado, Atkin qualified to the slopestyle final in second place but finished in fifth place in the final. In January 2018, she won bronze at the ski slopestyle World Cup held in Aspen Snowmass, Colorado.

At the 2019 World Championships, Atkin took bronze in the big air event, while the slopestyle event was cancelled. Atkin took silver in the slopestyle event at the 2021 Winter X Games despite crashing on her fourth run and being taken to Aspen Valley Hospital. Atkin confirmed she had suffered a concussion from the crash. Atkin also competed in the big air event, finishing in sixth place.

=== Winter Olympics ===
At the 2018 Winter Olympic Games at Pyeongchang, South Korea, she scored 84.60 points in her final run to win the bronze medal in slopestyle. Her win was Great Britain's first medal won by a skier at the Olympics. (A previous British skier Alain Baxter was stripped of his bronze medal in the slalom at the 2002 Winter Olympics after testing positive in a drug test.)

Atkin qualified to the Olympics again in the slopestyle and big air events for the 2022 Winter Olympics in Beijing. However, Atkin had broken her pelvis seven weeks prior to the start of the games, and despite intending to compete and flying to Beijing, on 30 January 2022 she announced that she would withdraw from the big air event. Atkin mentioned that she returned to skiing six weeks after her injury and hoped to still compete in the slopestyle event later in the week. Despite this, on 11 February 2022, one day before the qualifying event, she announced that she would withdraw from slopestyle as well to allow for rehabilitation from her injury.

=== Retirement ===
Atkin retired after the 2022 Winter Olympics.
