= Camillia Berra =

Swiss freestyle skier

Personal information
- Nationality: Swiss
- Born: 2 December 1994 (age 30); Champéry, Switzerland
- Height: 161 cm (5 ft 3 in)
- Weight: 61 kg (134 lb)

Sport
- Sport: Freestyle skiing

Camillia Berra (born 2 December 1994) is a Swiss freestyle skier. She was born in Champéry. She competed at the 2014 Winter Olympics in Sochi, in slopestyle, where she qualified for the finals.
