= Vincent Gagnier =

Canadian freestyle skier

Personal information
- Born: July 21, 1993 (age 32) Victoriaville, Quebec, Canada

Sport
- Sport: Skiing
Medal record
Men's freestyle skiing
Representing Canada
Winter X Games
Gold medal – first place	2015 Aspen	Big Air
Silver medal – second place	2014 Aspen	Big Air

Vincent Gagnier (born July 21, 1993) is a Canadian professional freestyle skier. He won a gold medal at the Winter X Games XIX in January 2015, winning the Big Air competition ahead of Bobby Brown and Elias Ambühl.
