= Hailey Langland =

American snowboarder (born 2000)

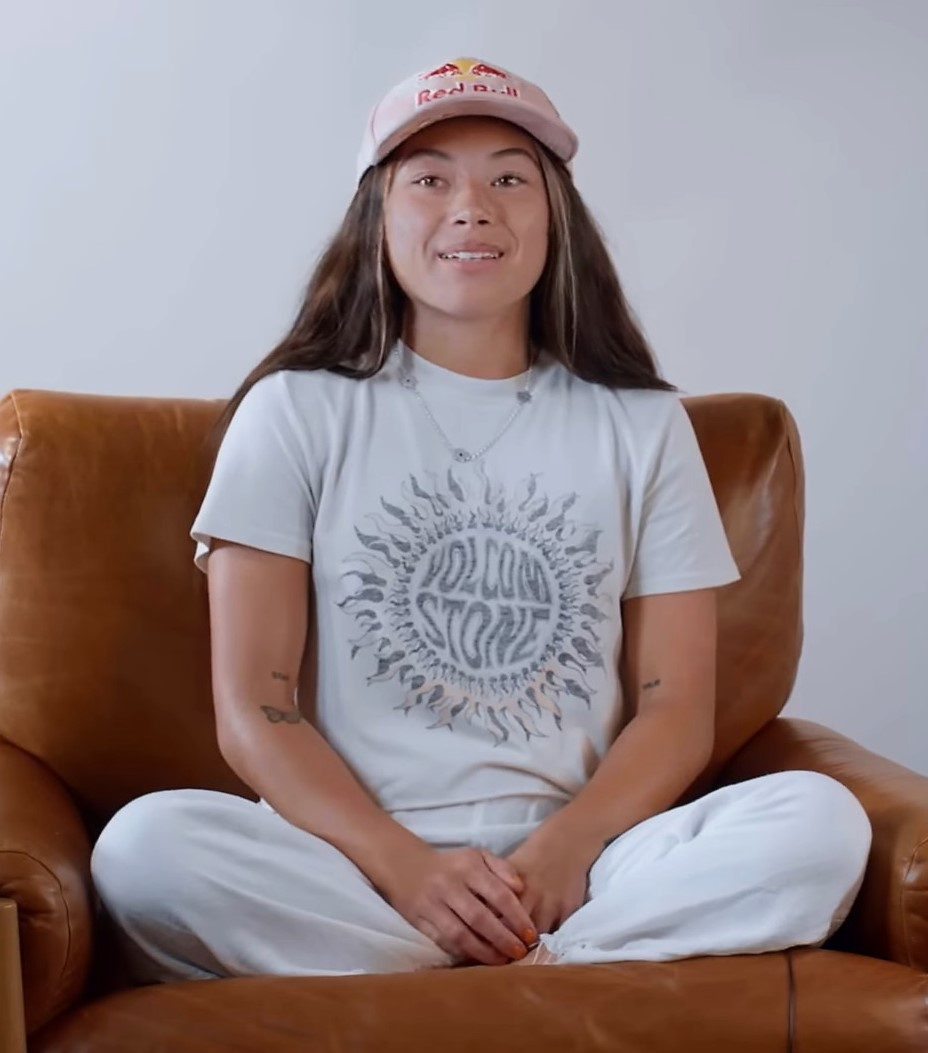
- Langland in 2022

Personal information
- Nickname: “Hails”
- Born: August 2, 2000 (age 25) Irvine, California, U.S.
- Home town: San Clemente, California, U.S.
- Height: 5 ft 2 in (157 cm)
- Weight: 110 lb (50 kg)
Medal record
Women's Snowboarding
Representing the United States
Winter X Games
Silver medal – second place	2019 Aspen	Slopestyle
Gold medal – first place	2017 Aspen	Big Air
Bronze medal – third place	2016 Aspen	SlopeStyle

Hailey Langland (born August 2, 2000) is an American snowboarder who won a bronze medal in slopestyle at Winter X Games XX. Langland made her first Olympic appearance at age 17 representing the United States in big air and slopestyle at the 2018 Winter Olympics in PyeongChang. She competed at the 2022 Winter Olympics, in Women's big air, and Women's slopestyle.

== Career ==
Langland spent her 2017 summer training with the US Snowboard Team at High Cascade Snowboard Camp. In 2018, she had a "Signature Session" at High Cascade.

She won the gold medal in the Big Air event new to the 2017 Winter X Games, with a clutch performance in the final minutes. She landed a double cork, becoming the first female rider to land the trick in X-Games history.

She competed at the 2019–20 FIS Freestyle Ski World Cup, 2020–21 FIS Freestyle Ski World Cup, and 2021–22 FIS Freestyle Ski World Cup.
