= Anna Segal =

Australian freestyle skier

Personal information
- Born: 15 August 1986 (age 40) Melbourne, Victoria, Australia
- Height: 164 cm (5 ft 5 in)
- Weight: 59 kg (130 lb)

Sport
- Country: Australia
- Sport: Freestyle Skiing
- Event: Ski Slopestyle Women
Medal record
Women's Freestyle skiing
Representing Australia
FIS Freestyle World Ski Championships
Bronze medal – third place	2013 Silvaplana	Slopestyle
Bronze medal – third place	2012 Copper Mt.	Slopestyle
Gold medal – first place	2011 Deer Valley	Slopestyle
US Freeski Open
Gold medal – first place	2007 Copper Mt.	Slopestyle
Winter Dew Tour
Bronze medal – third place	2013 Breckenridge	Slopestyle
Silver medal – second place	2012 Snowbasin	Slopestyle
Bronze medal – third place	2011 Snowbasin	Halfpipe
Silver medal – second place	2010 Snowbasin	Halfpipe
Silver medal – second place	2009 Mt. Snow	Slopestyle
Silver medal – second place	2008 Breckenridge	Slopestyle
Winter X Games
Bronze medal – third place	2012 Aspen	Slopestyle
Silver medal – second place	2012 Tignes	Slopestyle
Gold medal – first place	2009 Aspen	Slopestyle
- Updated on 6 February 2014

Anna Segal (born 15 August 1986) is an Australian Olympic freestyle slopestyle skier and two-time world champion.

Segal won the gold medal for the inaugural Women's Ski Slopestyle at Winter X Games 13 at Buttermilk Mountain on 24 January 2009 in Aspen, Colorado. She also won the gold medal in slopestyle at the 2011 FIS Freestyle World Ski Championships. She won the gold medal as well in the Slopestyle at the 2012 AFP World Championships in Whistler, Canada.

== Early life ==
Segal was born in Melbourne, Australia. Her parents are Susan Davis and Alan Segal. She was educated at St Catherine's School, Toorak, matriculating in 2004. She has a degree in Arts & Commerce from Monash University (2015). Her sister Nat Segal is a professional skier.

== Skiing career ==
Segal's home mountain is Whistler Blackcomb in Canada.

Segal initially began competitive skiing as a mogul skier, and subsequently moved into freeskiing events. She was a member of the NSWIS/SSA National Development mogul team 2003–05 and competed in several Europa Cup Mogul events during that time. She suffered a serious knee injury in 2006.

Her first major win in slopestyle was the Women's US Freeskiing Open at Copper Mountain, USA, in 2007.

She won the gold medal for the inaugural Women's Ski Slopestyle at Winter X Games 13 at Buttermilk Mountain on 24 January 2009 in Aspen, Colorado. She also won the gold medal in slopestyle at the 2011 FIS Freestyle World Ski Championships. Segal was named the 2011 Australian Snowsports Person of the Year by Skiing and Snowboarding Australia

Segal broke her thumb and damaged her knee in January 2012. She won the gold medal in the Slopestyle at the 2012 AFP World Championships in Whistler, Canada.

In early 2013, Segal damaged her left knee at a World Cup event in Switzerland. She took 3rd in Slopestyle at the FIS USA World Cup in 2013.

Segal competed for Australia at the 2014 Winter Olympics in Sochi, Russia, four weeks after learning she had torn the ACL in her knee. She came in fourth place, eight points behind bronze medalist Canadian Kim Lamarre in the women's ski slopestyle. It was Australia's first fourth-place finish ever in Winter Olympics history.

Segal retired from competitive skiing after the Olympics. During her career she sustained three ACL reconstructions, two meniscal tears, cartilage damage in her knee, a broken ankle, a broken thumb, and a few concussions.

Anna is now based in Whistler, Canada, with a focus on backcountry skiing and progressing women’s extreme skiing through ski films.

Anna co-produced her first feature film, Finding The Line (2018) alongside her sister, Nat Segal. The film has been screened at film festivals and events across the world and was recently purchased by Red Bull Media House.

Anna has filmed with ski film production companies: Warren Miller Entertainment (USA) and BLANK Collective Films (CAN)
