= Chris Devlin-Young =

American para-alpine skier (born 1962)

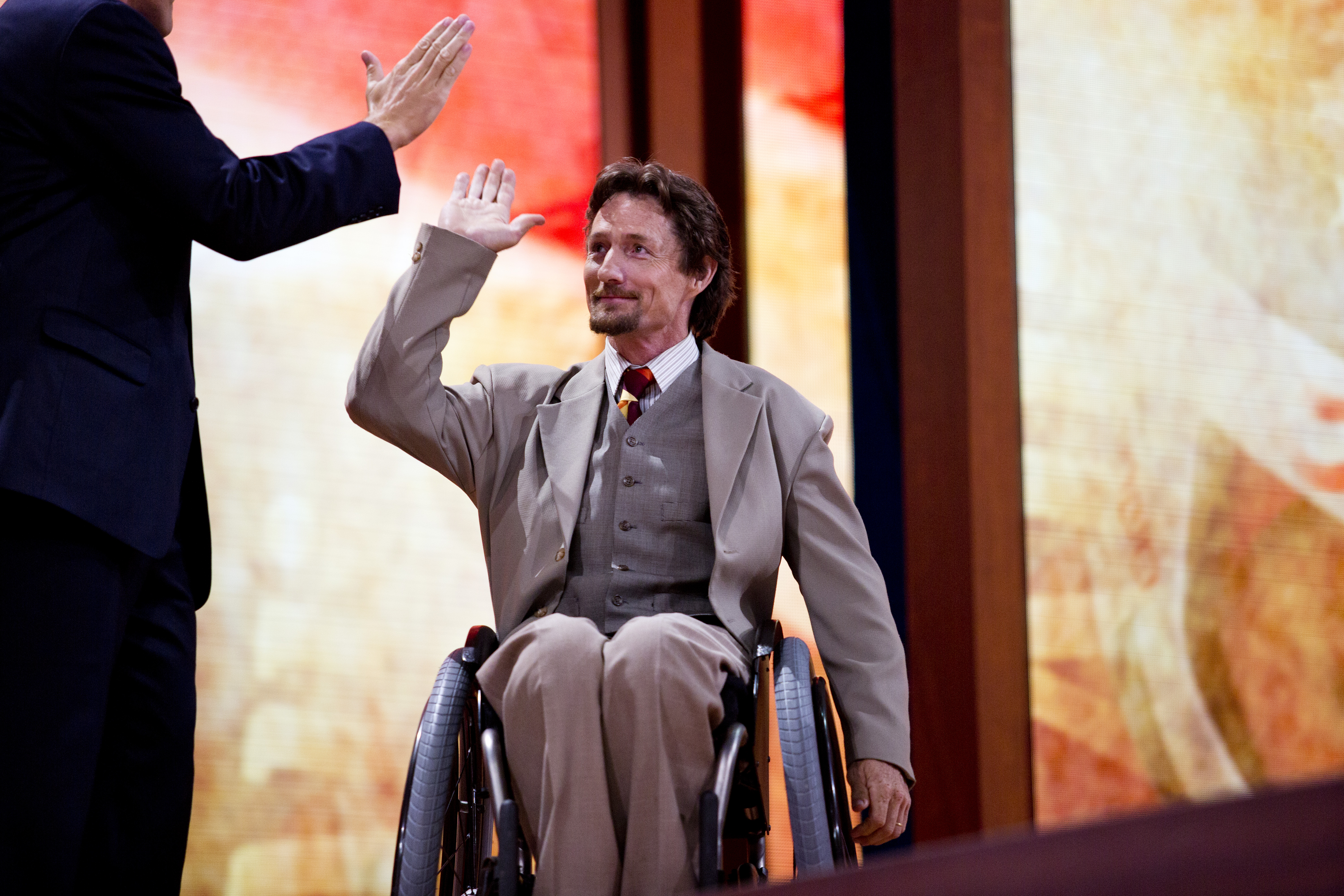
- Devlin-Young in 2012

Personal information
- Full name: Christopher Devlin-Young
- Born: December 26, 1962 (age 63) San Diego, California, U.S.
Medal record
Men's para alpine skiing
Representing the United States
Winter Paralympic Games
Gold medal – first place	1994 Lillehammer	Slalom
Gold medal – first place	2002 Salt Lake City	Super-G
Silver medal – second place	2002 Salt Lake City	Downhill
Silver medal – second place	2006 Torino	Downhill
Winter X Games
Gold medal – first place	2015 Aspen	Mono Skier X
Bronze medal – third place	2008 Aspen	Mono Skier X

Christopher Devlin-Young (born December 26, 1962) is an American alpine ski racer and two time Paralympic Champion, who resides in Campton, New Hampshire. He competes as a monoskier in the LW 12–1 class.

== Career ==
Born in San Diego, Young was paralyzed in a plane crash in Alaska while serving in the United States Coast Guard in 1982. He learned to ski at the National Disabled Veterans Winter Sports Clinic in 1986 as a "four-tracker," standing on two skis while using outriggers. He was named to the U.S. Disabled Ski Team in 1989 and competed in the 1990 Disabled Skiing World Championships in Winter Park, Colorado, winning a silver medal and two bronzes in the LW-1 class. Young missed the 1992 Winter Paralympic team but qualified for the 1994 Games in Lillehammer, Norway, where he won gold in the slalom.

In 1995 Young began a two-year hiatus from racing to coach the New England Disabled Ski team at Loon Mtn. New Hampshire, and when he returned to the sport in 1997 it was as a monoskier. He missed the 1998 Winter Paralympics in Nagano, Japan but came back in 2002 with another gold, this time in super G, along with a silver in downhill. With that performance he became the first skier ever to win a Paralympic skiing gold medal in two different disability classes. He repeated his downhill performance in 2006, placing second behind teammate Kevin Bramble. In 2015, he won the Mono Skier X (X-Games), also becoming the oldest gold medalist in the history of the competition.
