= Tucker Hibbert =

American snowmobile racer (born 1984)

Medal record

Men's snowmobile

Representing the United States

Winter X Games
Gold medal – first place	2016 Aspen	SnoCross
Gold medal – first place	2015 Aspen	SnoCross
Gold medal – first place	2014 Aspen	SnoCross
Gold medal – first place	2013 Aspen	SnoCross
Gold medal – first place	2011 Aspen	SnoCross
Gold medal – first place	2010 Aspen	SnoCross
Gold medal – first place	2009 Aspen	SnoCross
Gold medal – first place	2008 Aspen	SnoCross
Gold medal – first place	2007 Aspen	SnoCross
Gold medal – first place	2000 Mt. Snow	SnoCross
Silver medal – second place	2005 Aspen	SnoCross
Silver medal – second place	2004 Aspen	SnoCross
Silver medal – second place	2002 Aspen	SnoCross
Bronze medal – third place	2003 Aspen	SnoCross

Tucker Hibbert (born June 24, 1984, in Driggs, Idaho) is a retired American snowmobile racer.

Hibbert has won 14 medals at the Winter X Games, including an all-event record nine-straight in the SnoCross event. He had been the youngest gold medal winner in Winter X Games history until Chloe Kim won the SuperPipe at age 14 in 2015.

In addition to his Winter X Games success, Hibbert is also a two-time (2010, 2012) FIM Snowcross World Champion and 10-Time United States National Snocross Champion.

He resides in Pelican Rapids, Minnesota.
