= Lisa Zimmermann (skier) =

German freestyle skier

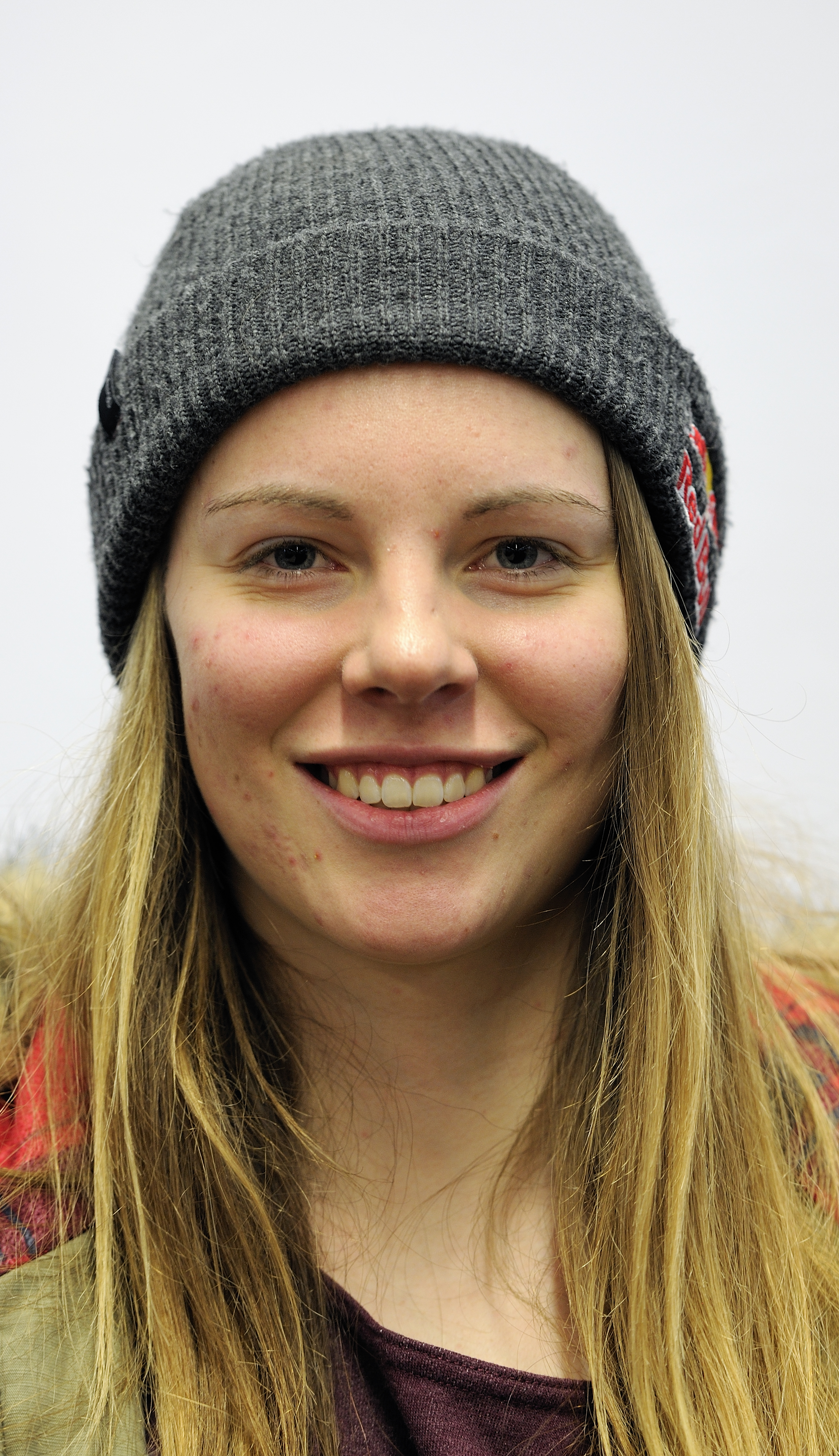
- Zimmermann in 2014

Personal information
- Born: 2 March 1996 (age 30) Nuremberg, Germany

Sport
- Sport: Skiing
- Club: TV Fürth 1860

World Cup career
- Seasons: 2013–
- Indiv. starts: 11
- Indiv. podiums: 7
- Indiv. wins: 4
Medal record
Women's freestyle skiing
Representing Germany
World Championships
Gold medal – first place	2015 Kreischberg	Slopestyle
Winter X Games
Gold medal – first place	2017 Aspen	Big Air
New Zealand Winter Games
Bronze medal – third place	2013 Cardrona	Slopestyle

Lisa Zimmermann (born 2 March 1996 in Nuremberg) is a German freestyle skier. She won the gold medal in slopestyle at the 2015 World Championships in Kreischberg.

== World Cup results ==
=== Season titles ===
- 1 title – (1 slopestyle)

Season	Discipline
2013–14	Slopestyle

=== Season standings ===
Season	Age	Overall	Slopestyle	Big Air
2012–13	16	179	41	—N/a
2013–14	17	8	1	—N/a
2014–15	18	not competed		
2015–16	19	55	4	1

=== Race Podiums ===
- 4 wins – (2 SS, 2 BA)
- 7 podiums – (4 SS, 3 BA)

Season	Date	Location	Discipline	Place
2013–14	25 August 2013	Cardrona, New Zealand	Slopestyle	3rd
2013–14	18 January 2014	Gstaad, Switzerland	Slopestyle	1st
2013–14	22 March 2014	Silvaplana, Switzerland	Slopestyle	1st
2015–16	28 August 2015	Cardrona, New Zealand	Slopestyle	3rd
2015–16	12 February 2016	(United States) Boston, USA	Big Air	1st
2016–17	11 November 2016	Milan, Italy	Big Air	1st
2016–17	2 December 2016	Mönchengladbach, Germany	Big Air	3rd

== Olympic results ==
Year	Age	Slopestyle	Big Air
(Russia) 2014 Sochi	17	14	—N/a

== World Championships results ==
Year	Age	Slopestyle	Big Air
(Norway) 2013 Voss	16	17	—N/a
(Austria) 2015 Kreischberg	18	1	—N/a
