= FIS Freestyle Ski and Snowboarding World Championships 2019 – Women's ski big air =

Women's ski big air at the FIS Freestyle Ski and Snowboarding World Championships 2019
- Venue: Park City Mountain Resort
- Location: Utah, United States
- Dates: February 2
- Competitors: 16 from 11 nations
- Winning points: 184.75

Medalists
gold medal	Tess Ledeux	France
silver medal	Julia Krass	United States
bronze medal	Isabel Atkin	Great Britain

The Women's ski big air competition at the FIS Freestyle Ski and Snowboarding World Championships 2019 was held on February 2, 2019.

== Qualification ==
The qualification was started at 09:40.

Rank	Order	Name	Country	Run 1	Run 2	Best	Notes
1	18	Anastasia Tatalina	Russia	95.00	81.00	95.00	Q
2	1	Tess Ledeux	France	92.00	89.00	92.00	Q
3	9	Sarah Höfflin	Switzerland	91.50	56.75	91.50	Q
4	17	Mathilde Gremaud	Switzerland	47.50	86.00	86.00	Q
5	14	Isabel Atkin	Great Britain	84.00	74.50	84.00	Q
6	8	Julia Krass	United States	82.50	23.25	82.50	Q
7	19	Maggie Voisin	United States	80.25	21.50	80.25	Q
8	4	Silvia Bertagna	Italy	78.50	38.00	78.50	Q
9	11	Johanne Killi	Norway	41.50	74.75	74.75	
10	12	Lara Wolf	Austria	65.75	72.00	72.00	
11	2	Lana Prusakova	Russia	71.00	14.25	71.00	
12	7	Kea Kühnel	Germany	59.00	64.00	64.00	
13	6	Margaux Hackett	New Zealand	41.75	62.25	62.25	
14	13	Coline Ballet-Baz	France	56.75	20.50	56.75	
15	5	Elena Gaskell	Canada	53.75	16.00	53.75	
16	16	Caroline Claire	United States	19.50	49.25	49.25	
—	3	Eileen Gu	United States	Did not start			
—	10	Kelly Sildaru	Estonia	Did not start			
—	15	Giulia Tanno	Switzerland	Did not start			

== Final ==
The final was started at 19:00.

Rank	Name	Country	Run 1	Run 2	Run 3	Total	Notes
1st place, gold medalist(s)	Tess Ledeux	France	94.75	89.25	90.00	184.75	
2nd place, silver medalist(s)	Julia Krass	United States	88.75	67.75	85.00	173.75	
3rd place, bronze medalist(s)	Isabel Atkin	Great Britain	79.25	81.50	87.25	168.75	
4	Sarah Höfflin	Switzerland	92.75	21.25	75.00	167.75	
5	Silvia Bertagna	Italy	71.00	51.25	14.50	122.25	
6	Anastasia Tatalina	Russia	12.75	26.25	79.75	92.50	
7	Mathilde Gremaud	Switzerland	17.25	17.00	60.50	77.75	
8	Maggie Voisin	United States	24.75	24.00	17.00	41.75	
