= Christy Prior =

New Zealand snowboarder

Personal information
- Born: 28 November 1988 (age 37) Okehampton, England
- Height: 161 cm (5 ft 3 in)
- Weight: 62 kg (137 lb)

Sport
- Country: New Zealand
- Sport: Snowboarding
- Event: Women's slopestyle
Medal record
Winter X Games
Bronze medal – third place	2015 Aspen	Slopestyle
- Updated on 25 January 2015

Christy Prior (born 28 November 1988) is a snowboarder from New Zealand. Born in Okehampton, Devon, UK, she competed for New Zealand at the 2014 Winter Olympics in Sochi.

After qualifying for the semifinals of the snowboard slopestyle, she withdrew from the event following a crash in practice.

In January 2015 she won the bronze medal at the Winter X Games XIX in Aspen, and the gold medal in slopestyle at the Burton European Open in Laxx.

== Competition History ==
- 1st place Burton European Open Slopestyle 2015
- Winter X Games 2015 Bronze Slopestyle
- 2014 3rd place Overall FIS World Snowboard Slopestyle Ranking
- 1st place Stoneham World Cup 2014
- 1st place TTR 5-star Community Cup Slopestyle 2014
- Ms. Superpark MVP 2013
- Ms. Superpark Standout 2013
- 2nd place Burton High Fives 2012
