= Megan Gunning =

Canadian freestyle skier

Personal information
- Born: July 13, 1992 (age 33) Atlanta, Georgia, U.S.
- Height: 5 ft 4 in (1.63 m)
- Weight: 135 lb (61 kg; 9.6 st)

Sport
- Country: Canada
- Sport: Women's freestyle skiing
Medal record
Women's freestyle skiing
Representing Canada
FIS Freestyle World Ski Championships
Silver medal – second place	2009 Inawashiro	Halfpipe
Winter X Games
Silver medal – second place	Winter X Games XIV	Superpipe
Bronze medal – third place	Winter X Games XVII	Superpipe

Megan Gunning (born July 13, 1992) is a Canadian freestyle skier. She won the silver medal in the halfpipe at the 2009 FIS Freestyle World Ski Championships as well as two medals in Winter X Games competition. Gunning was named to the 2014 Winter Olympics team in ski halfpipe but she injured her knee on while preparing for the X-games and was unable to compete at the Olympics.
