= Anna Mirtova =

Russian freestyle skier

Personal information
- Born: 14 July 1992 (age 34) Tomsk, Russia

Sport
- Sport: Skiing

Anna Mirtova (born 14 July 1992 in Tomsk) is a Russian freestyle skier, specializing in slopestyle.

Mirtova competed at the 2014 Winter Olympics for Russia. She placed 21st in the qualifying round in the slopestyle, failing to advance.

Mirtova made her World Cup debut in January 2013. As of September 2015, her best World Cup finish is 7th, at Silvaplana in 2012–13. Her best World Cup overall finish in slopestyle is 27th, in 2012–13.
