= Torin Yater-Wallace =

American freestyle skier (born 1995)

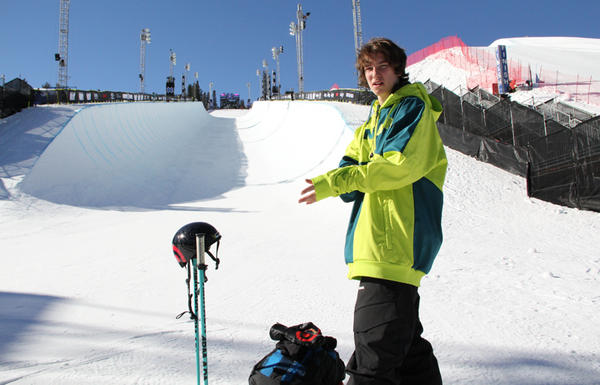
- 2012

Personal information
- Born: December 2, 1995 (age 30) Aspen, Colorado, U.S.
- Height: 5 ft 9 in (175 cm)

Sport
- Sport: Skiing
Medal record
Men's freestyle skiing
Representing the United States
FIS Freestyle World Ski Championships
| Silver medal – second place | 2013 Voss | Halfpipe |
Winter X Games
| Silver medal – second place | 2011 Aspen | SuperPipe |
| Silver medal – second place | 2013 Aspen | SuperPipe |
| Bronze medal – third place | 2012 Aspen | SuperPipe |
| Bronze medal – third place | 2018 Aspen | SuperPipe |
Winter X Games Europe
| Gold medal – first place | 2012 Tignes | SuperPipe |
| Gold medal – first place | 2013 Tignes | SuperPipe |
| Gold medal – first place | 2016 Oslo | SuperPipe |
| Bronze medal – third place | 2011 Tignes | SuperPipe |

Torin Yater-Wallace (born December 2, 1995, in Aspen, Colorado) is a freestyle skier from the United States. He won a silver medal at Winter X Games XV in the superpipe, making him the youngest medalist in Winter X-Games history. Torin is one of the best free skiers in the world.

During the summer, Yater-Wallace can be found at Mt. Hood, Oregon, where he hosts a Takeover Session at Windells Camp.

== Early and personal life ==
At just 15 years of age, Yater-Wallace was the third-youngest male competitor in Winter X Games history. In early 2016 he bought a house in Basalt, Colorado.

== Career ==
2016 Competition Highlights

1st Winter X-Games Europe Oslo Norway

2014 Competition Highlights

1st Olympics Sochi, Russia

2013 Competition Highlights

2nd Winter X-Games Aspen, CO
2nd US Grand Prix Park City, UT
1st Olympic Test Event Sochi, Russia
2nd FIS World Championships Voss, Norway
1st Winter X-Games Europe Tignes France

2012 Competition Highlights

1st NZ Winter Games Snowpark, NZ
2nd NZ Freeski Open Candrona, NZ
3rd Winter Dew Tour Ogden, UT
1st Winter Dew Tour, Killington, VT
2nd Winter Dew Tour Overall
3rd Winter X-Games Aspen, CO
1st Winter X-Games Europe Tignes, FR

During the 2012 U.S. Grand Prix slopestyle competition, Yater-Wallace landed the first switch 1800 jump completed in competition

2011 Competition Highlights

2nd Winter X-Games Aspen
3rd Winter X-Games Europe, Tignes, France
2nd Grand Prix Copper, CO

== Film segments ==
- 2022 'Chameleon" - Deviate Productions
- 2021 'Good Luck' - Deviate Productions
- 2020 'Deviate' - Deviate Productions
- 2017 'Back to Life' - Red Bull Mediahouse
- 2013 'Partly Cloudy' – Level 1 Productions
- 2012 'Sunny' – Level 1 Productions
- 2011 'Attack of La Nina' – Matchstick Productions
