= Bobby Brown (freestyle skier) =

American freestyle skier

Personal information
- Born: June 5, 1991 (age 35) Denver, Colorado, U.S.
- Height: 6 ft 2 in (188 cm)
- Weight: 185 lb (84 kg)
Medal record
Men's freestyle skiing
Representing the United States
Winter Dew Tour
Gold medal – first place	2008 Breckenridge	Slopestyle
Gold medal – first place	2009 Mt. Snow	Slopestyle
Winter X Games
Gold medal – first place	2010 Aspen	SlopeStyle
Gold medal – first place	2010 Aspen	Big Air
Gold medal – first place	2012 Aspen	Big Air
Silver medal – second place	2011 Aspen	Big Air
Silver medal – second place	2015 Aspen	Big Air
Silver medal – second place	2016 Aspen	Big Air
Winter X Games Europe
Gold medal – first place	2012 Tignes	SlopeStyle
Silver medal – second place	2010 Tignes	SlopeStyle

Bobby Brown (born June 5, 1991) is an American freeskier specializing in slopestyle and big air competitions.

Brown was the first to execute multiple variations of a triple flip or triple cork at a training session in Squaw Valley, California. He gained notoriety after winning both the SlopeStyle and Big Air events at Winter X Games XIV, registering a perfect score of 100 in the latter. Brown was the first person to have landed a Switch Double Misty 1440. He was one of the first skiers ever to have landed a Triple Cork 1440.

Bobby is known for his tricks in the air, He has successfully landed many triple corks. Brown had a web show called "Bobby's Life", which features his life, friends, and skiing. In addition, Brown was the first skier to win two gold medals in the same Winter X Games.

Bobby Brown is a Red Bull Athlete. He is currently managed by Superheroes Management.

== Competitions ==
- 7th place Jon Olsson Invitational
- 09-10 Dew Tours
- 2009: 4th at Breckenridge Totino's Open
- 2010: 3rd at Snowbasin Wendy's Invitational
- 2010: 1st at Mount Snow Toyota Challenge
- Dew Tour:
- 2010: 2nd in year-end Dew Cup standings
- 2009: 3rd in year-end Dew Cup standings
- 2011: Overall dew cup champion
- Other Competitions
- 2010: 1st at Sweet Rumble Big Air
- 2010: 1st at Toyota's One Hit Wonder Down Under
- 2010: 1st at Slopestyle Junior World Championships (New Zealand)
- 2010: ESPY's Best Male Action Sports Athlete Nominee
- 2010: 2nd at Winter X Games Europe Slopestyle
- 2010: 1st at Winter X Games Big Air
- 2010: 1st at Winter X Games Slopestyle
- 2010: 1st at 100% NZ Winter Games Big Air
- 2009: 6th at Winter X Games
- 2009: 2nd in London Freeze Big Air
- 2008: 1st in Big Bear Open Slopestyle
- 2008: 4th in North American Open Slopestyle
- 2011: 2nd in Winter x Games Big air
- 2012: 1st in Winter X Games Big air
- 2012: 2nd at Sammy Carlson invitational
- 2015: Winter X Games Silver-Big Air
- 2014: 2nd place World Ski and Snowboard Festival-Big Air & Slopestyle
- 2014: 2nd place 2014 AFP Ranking-Slopestyle
- 2014: 1st place 2014 Breckenridge Grand Prix
- 2012: Winter X Games Gold-Big Air
- 2012: Winter X Games Tignes Gold-Slopestyle,
- 2011: 1st Overall in 2011 Dew Tour Year End Rankings-Slopestyle
- 2010: 1st Overall in 2010 AFP Year End Rankings-Slopestyle
- 2010: US Olympic Freeski Team Member (inaugural event in Sochi, Russia)

== Personal ==
Brown is the son of Bob and Connie. He has a sister, Grace, and brother, Peter. He attended Cherry Creek High School in Colorado.

Brown became engaged to long-time girlfriend, Nikki Gallen, on January 26, 2017.
