= Chiho Takao =

Japanese freestyle skier (born 1984)

Personal information
- Born: February 20, 1984 (age 42) Nerima, Tokyo, Japan

Sport
- Sport: Skiing

World Cup career
- Indiv. podiums: 2

Chiho Takao (高尾 千穂) (born February 20, 1984, in Nerima, Tokyo) is a Japanese freestyle skier, specializing in slopestyle.

Takao competed at the 2014 Winter Olympics for Japan. She placed 22nd in the qualifying round in the slopestyle, failing to advance.

As of April 2014, her best showing at the World Championships is 14th, in the 2013 slopestyle.

Takao made her World Cup debut in February 2012. As of April 2014, her best World Cup finish is 4th, at Sierra Nevada in 2012–13. Her best World Cup overall finish in slopestyle is 5th, in 2011–12.
