= Tiril Sjåstad Christiansen =

Norwegian freestyle skier (born 1995)

Personal information
- Born: 7 April 1995 (age 31) Ringerike, Norway
- Height: 167 cm (5 ft 6 in) (2014)

Sport
- Country: Norway
- Sport: Freestyle skiing
Medal record
Women's freestyle skiing
Representing Norway
Winter X Games
Gold medal – first place	2013 Aspen	Slopestyle
Silver medal – second place	2016 Aspen	Slopestyle
Winter X Games Europe
Gold medal – first place	2016 Oslo	Big Air
Silver medal – second place	2013 Tignes	Slopestyle
Bronze medal – third place	2018 Oslo	Big Air
Youth Olympic Games
Silver medal – second place	2012 Innsbruck	Halfpipe
New Zealand Winter Games
Gold medal – first place	2013 Cardrona	Slopestyle
- Updated on 27 February 2016

Tiril Sjåstad Christiansen (born 7 April 1995) is a former Norwegian freestyle skier.

== Biography ==
Sjåstad Christiansen hails from Geilo and represents Geilo IL. She won her first Winter X Games medal in the Women's Slopestyle at the Winter X Games XVII in Aspen, Colorado. She won gold ahead of Kaya Turski and Dara Howell. Months later she continued to dominate on the podium and won her second Winter X Games medal, but this time it was a silver.
