= Eveline Bhend =

Swiss freestyle skier

Personal information
- Nationality: Swiss
- Born: 6 April 1981 (age 43); Unterseen, Switzerland

Sport
- Sport: Freestyle skiing

Eveline Bhend (born 6 April 1981) is a Swiss freestyle skier. She was born in Unterseen. She competed at the 2014 Winter Olympics in Sochi, in slopestyle, where she placed ninth in the final.
