= Daniela Bauer =

Austrian freestyle skier (born 1986)

Personal information
- Born: 11 February 1986 (age 39)

Sport
- Country: Austria
- Sport: Freestyle skiing

Daniela Bauer (born 11 February 1986) is an Austrian freestyle skier. She is the reigning Australian Champion in halfpipe with the Championships last being held in 2008 at Perisher, Australia.

Bauer has also competed in World Championships and World Cups. She is currently ranked in the top 30 of the best female Halfpipe skiers in the world.
