= Thomas Åberg =

Swedish composer and organist

- Born: 1952 (age 72–73); Stockholm, Sweden
- Origin: Sweden
- Genres: Contemporary classical
- Occupation(s): Composer, organist
- Instrument: Organ
- Years active: 1978–present
- Formerly of: Skeppsholmen Group
- Website: Official Website

Thomas Åberg (born 1952, Stockholm) is a Swedish composer and organist known for performing his own music. He has spent his career based in Stockholm and is recognized for a distinctive approach that blends performance and composition.

== Career ==
Åberg made his debut in 1978 with the organ work Daylight, premiered as part of the Skeppsholmen Group an experimental music collective active from 1978 to 1981. In the early 1980s, he began performing concerts focused mostly on his own works, following a model more typical of solo artists in popular music than traditional organists.

In 1994, he was commissioned by the Stockholms domkyrkoförsamling to perform six concerts during the Stockholm Water Festival.

For over 30 years, Åberg worked as a music administrator at STIM, Sweden's performing rights society, which gave him the freedom to develop a concert-focused musical path rather than a church based one. He has toured extensively in Sweden, performed internationally including in the United States and released a number of recordings across various formats.

== Background ==
Åberg studied piano with Märta Söderberg, organ with Tore Nilson, and composition with Stig Gustav Schönberg. His early music was experimental and non-tonal, but over time his style became more structured. He has written a series of organ toccatas and larger works such as Weisflog's Dog, which reflect his mature voice as a composer.
