= Jamie Crane-Mauzy =

American freestyle skier

Personal information
- Born: October 10, 1992 (age 34) Westport, Connecticut, U.S.
Medal record
Women's freestyle skiing
Representing the United States
Junior World Championships
Gold medal – first place	2010 Otago	Slopestyle

Jamie Crane-Mauzy (Jamie MoCrazy) is an American freestyle skier and motivational speaker.

== Life and career ==
Jamie Crane-Mauzy was born in Westport, Connecticut. At the age of 9, she won State Championships in gymnastics and skiing. She graduated with a BA in Communications from Westminster College in 2019.

Crane-Mauzy was the first female skier to land a double backflip in a competition at the Winter X Games XVII in Aspen, Colorado. Her professional career ended after a skiing accident in 2015, and she now works as a motivational speaker.

In 2023, Crane-Mauzy co-directed the short documentary #MoCrazyStrong, along with Mark Locki, which premiered at Big Sky Documentary Film Festival, won the best biographical documentary short at the Atlanta DocuFest.

=== 2015 skiing accident ===
On April 11, 2015, Crane-Mauzy was involved in a serious accident while competing in the World Tour Finals in Whistler. In an attempt to move up from fourth place, she upgraded her flat 3 to a double flat seven. She completed the jump and landed on her feet, but caught her edge and whiplashed her head onto the snow. Her brain immediately began bleeding in 8 different spots and her brain stem was damaged, causing complete paralysis on her right side. She was treated in Vancouver General Hospital, where she remained for 8 days before again being transported to Intermountain Medical Center in Murray, UT.

== Freestyle skiing results ==
- 2010 1st Junior World Championships, New Zealand
- 2013 7th Winter X Games XVII (Slopestyle) Aspen, Colorado
- 2015 13th FIS Freestyle World Ski Championships (Slopestyle) Kreischberg, Austria
- 2015 13th FIS Freestyle World Ski Championships (halfpipe) Kreischberg, Austria
