= Ashley Battersby =

American professional freestyle skier (born 1988)

Personal information
- Born: January 27, 1988 (age 38) Chicago, Illinois, United States
- Education: University of Utah, Westminster College

Sport
- Sport: Freestyle Skiing
- Club: The Winter Sports School (Park City, UT)
- Updated on 6 October 2014

Ashley Battersby is a female American professional freestyle skier originally from Chicago, Illinois who now resides in Park City, Utah. Battersby has had a considerable amount of success so far in her young career, winning slopestyle in the 2008 U.S. Open, slopestyle in the 2010 Aspen Open, and grabbing her first X-Games medal in 2010. In 2012, the Association of Freeskiing Professionals ranked Battersby 4th overall among women freestyle skiers.
