= Julia Krass =

American freestyle skier

Personal information
- Born: June 7, 1997 (age 29) Danbury, New Hampshire, United States
- Height: 5 ft 8.5 in (174 cm)
- Weight: 133 lb (60 kg)

Sport
- Country: United States
- Sport: Freestyle skiing
- Event: Big air
- Club: Park City Ski and Snowboard Club
Medal record
World Championships
Silver medal – second place	2019 Utah	Big air

Julia Krass (born June 7, 1997) is an American freestyle skier. Krass competed in the 2014 Winter Olympics which took place in Sochi, Russia. She came 11th place in the 2014 Winter Olympics in slope style.

She began skiing at age two and a half when her mother would taker her to the Whaleback Mountain in New Hampshire, United States. She joined the Whaleback Mountain youth skiing programme at age nine.
