= Natália Šlepecká =

Slovak freestyle skier

Personal information
- Born: 6 August 1983 (age 43) Liptovský Mikuláš, Czechoslovakia

Sport
- Sport: Skiing

World Cup career
- Indiv. podiums: 1

Natália Šlepecká (born 6 August 1983) is a Slovak freestyle skier, specializing in slopestyle.

Šlepecká competed at the 2014 Winter Olympics for Slovakia. She placed 18th in the qualifying round in the slopestyle, failing to advance.

As of September 2015, her best showing at the World Championships is 8th, in the 2013 slopestyle.

Šlepecká made her World Cup debut in February 2012. As of September 2015, she has one World Cup podium finish, a bronze medal at Jyväskylä in 2011–12. Her best World Cup overall finish in slopestyle is 6th, in 2011–12.

== World Cup podiums ==
Date	Location	Rank	Event
25 February 2012	Jyväskylä	3rd place, bronze medalist(s)	Slopestyle
