= Kim Lamarre =

Canadian freestyle skier (born 1988)

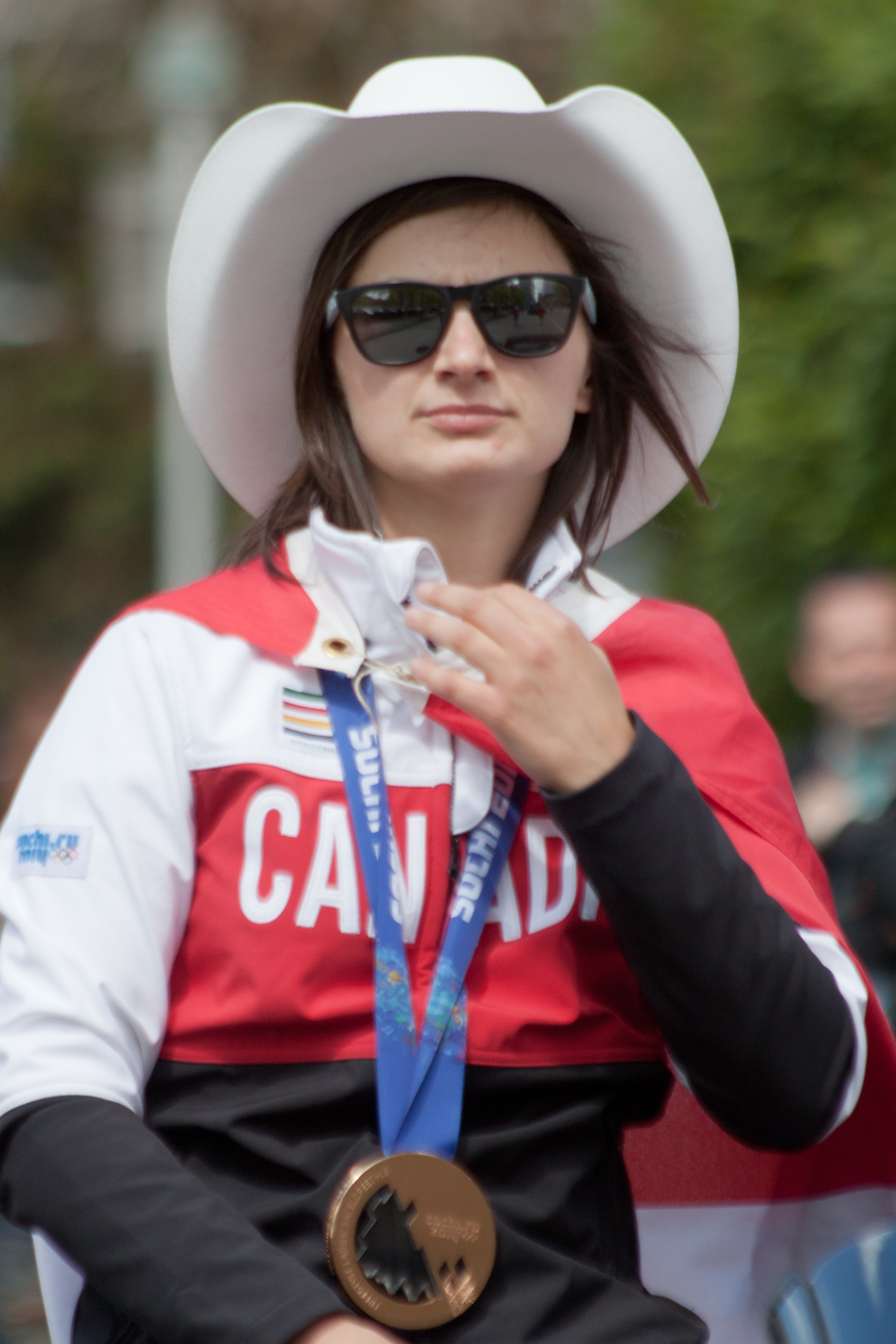
- Kim Lamarre in Calgary (2014)

Personal information
- Born: May 20, 1988 (age 38) Quebec City, Quebec, Canada
- Height: 5 ft 4 in (163 cm)
- Weight: 125 lb (57 kg)
- Website: kimlamarre.com

Sport
- Country: Canada
- Sport: Freestyle skiing
Medal record
Women's freestyle skiing
Representing Canada
Olympic Games
Bronze medal – third place	2014 Sochi	Slopestyle
Winter X Games
Bronze medal – third place	2014 Aspen	Slopestyle

Kim Lamarre (born 20 May 1988) is a Canadian freestyle skier. She won Canada's first ever bronze medal in the women's slopestyle skiing event at the 2014 Winter Olympics. Lamarre said of her surprise bronze that "This is surreal. I have no words to describe this feeling. I am so happy. I knew it was possible but I didn't put it as my main goal. I just wanted to make the finals and then land my run and see what happened." The medal came after compatriot and gold medal favourite Kaya Turski failed to qualify for the finals. Despite this Canada still managed two medals in the event after Dara Howell won the gold medal.

== Personal life ==
Lamarre's grandmother, Ginette Seguin, represented Canada at the 1956 Winter Olympics and competed in alpine skiing. She was 18th in the slalom, 33rd in downhill and 36th in giant slalom.
