= Rosalind Groenewoud =

Canadian freestyle skier (born 1989)

- Groenewoud in 2016

Personal information
- Nickname: Roz G
- Born: December 10, 1989 (age 36) Calgary, Alberta, Canada
- Height: 1.77 m (5 ft 10 in)
- Weight: 63 kg (139 lb)

Sport
- Country: Canada
Medal record
Women's Freestyle skiing
Representing Canada
FIS Freestyle World Ski Championships
Gold medal – first place	2011 Deer Valley	Halfpipe
Winter X Games
Gold medal – first place	2012 Aspen	SuperPipe
Gold medal – first place	2012 Tignes	SuperPipe
Silver medal – second place	2010 Tignes	SuperPipe
Silver medal – second place	2013 Aspen	SuperPipe
Silver medal – second place	2014 Aspen	SuperPipe
Bronze medal – third place	2010 Aspen	SuperPipe
Bronze medal – third place	2011 Aspen	SuperPipe

Rosalind Groenewoud (born December 10, 1989) is a Canadian freeskier, known as Roz G in the action sports world. She is the 2011 FIS World Champion in halfpipe, Groenewoud is also a 2012 Winter X Games champion x 2 (Aspen and Tignes) and has 3 silver and two bronze medals from X Games competitions in halfpipe. She won the AFP Overall Championship in 2009 and 2010 and AFP Halfpipe Overall Ranking in 2012. Groenewoud is a two-time Olympian, 2014 and 2018. She is the first woman to design her own pro-model freestyle ski with the female owned ski company Coalition Snow.

== Career ==
Groenewoud won the gold medal in the halfpipe at the 2011 FIS Freestyle World Ski Championships. When Groenewoud won gold during the 2012 Winter X Games in Aspen and in Tignes, she dedicated her wins to teammate Sarah Burke who died in January 2012 in a training run. During 2013, Groenewoud was considered among the top female skiers in her sport and as such was a favourite to win gold in the new Olympic sport of halfpipe at the 2014 Winter Olympics in Sochi. During the 2012–13 FIS Freestyle Skiing World Cup she finished second at the stop in Sochi that was considered the last test event at the location before the Olympics.

Prior to the 2014 Winter Olympics Groenewoud required surgery on both her knees because of an injury that occurred in December, 2013. Despite this, she qualified for Canada's team at the Olympics. Two weeks before the Olympics, Groenewoud successfully competed at the X-Games '14 where she won the silver medal in the superpipe competition. Groenewoud finished seventh in her event's Olympic debut at Sochi 2014. Groenewoud also qualified for the 2018 Winter Olympics but had a broken humerus bone when she competed. Despite this injury, she qualified for finals and finished 10th.

== Personal life ==
Groenewoud was a close friend and teammate for 7 years of deceased Sarah Burke whom she considers her inspiration. She carried her name on her helmet in all competitions.

She was a member of the Target action sports team. Her 2014 Olympic sponsors were P&G, RBC, Visa, General Mills, Bell Canada, BMW Canada.

She studied math and physics at Quest University and completed her medical degree at the University of British Columbia Faculty of Medicine in 2023. She is currently a cardiac surgery resident in Vancouver. She began her Master of Public Health at the Harvard T.H. Chan School of Public Health and is set to graduate in 2027.
