= Dara Howell =

Canadian freestyle skier (born 1994)

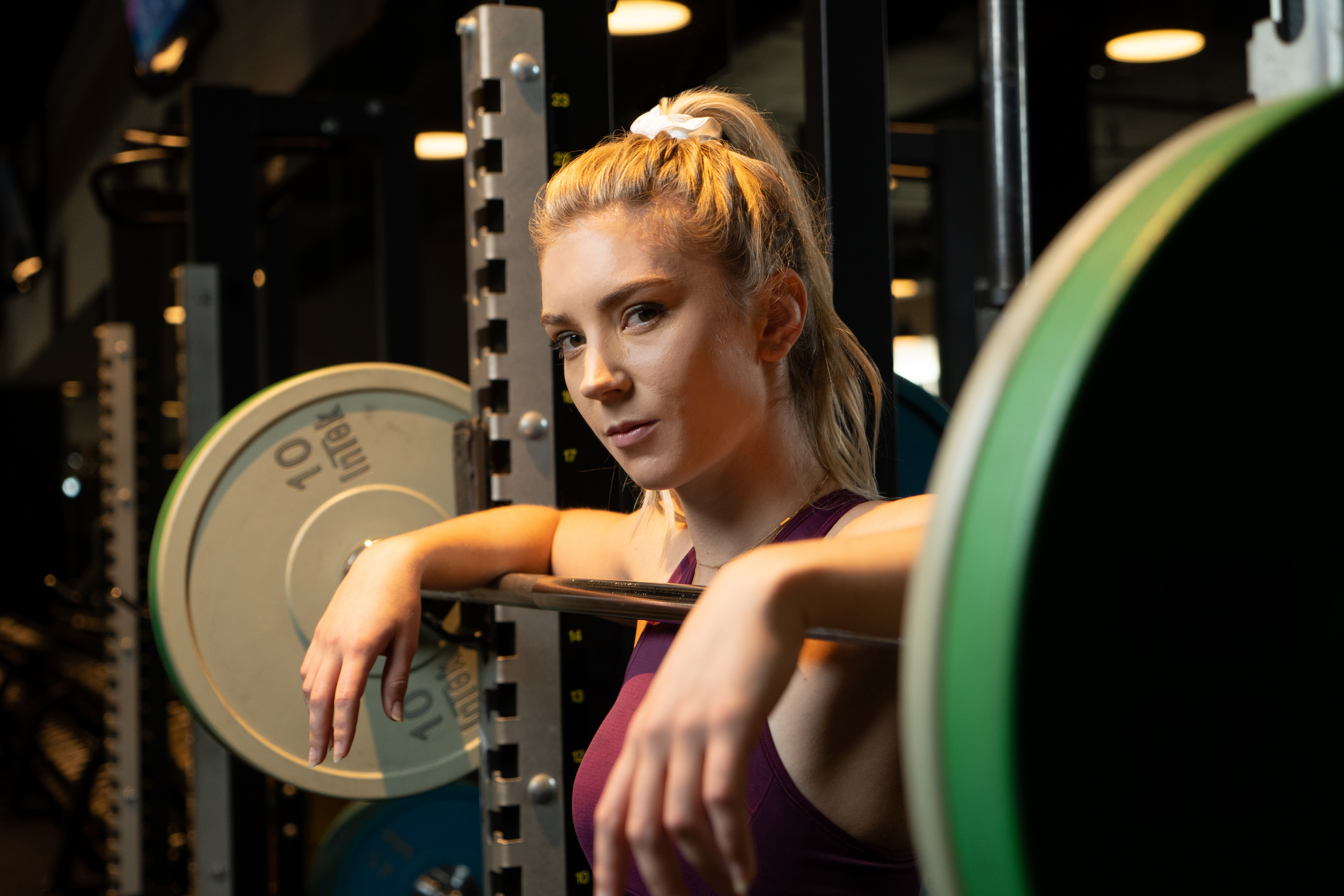
- Dara Howell at a photoshoot in 2019

Personal information
- Nicknames: Dar, Lizzy D
- Born: August 23, 1994 (age 31) Huntsville, Ontario, Canada
- Height: 5 ft 10 in (178 cm)
Medal record
Women's freestyle skiing
Representing Canada
Olympic Games
Gold medal – first place	2014 Sochi	Slopestyle
World Championships
Silver medal – second place	2013 Voss	Slopestyle
Winter X Games
Bronze medal – third place	2012 Tignes	Slopestyle
Bronze medal – third place	2013 Aspen	Slopestyle
Bronze medal – third place	2013 Tignes	Slopestyle
Bronze medal – third place	2015 Aspen	Slopestyle

Dara Howell (born August 23, 1994) is a Canadian freestyle skier. She was the first freestyle skier to win a gold medal in ski slopestyle at the inaugural event at the 2014 Winter Olympics in Sochi. Howell has also won a bronze medal in women's slopestyle at the Winter X Games XVII in Aspen, Colorado, behind Tiril Sjåstad Christiansen and Kaya Turski.

== Career ==
Howell first competed at the Winter X Games in Aspen 2012, and was the youngest female competitor. She followed this with a Bronze Medal in the 2012 Winter X Games in Tignes. As of 2019, she has won 4 medals at the Winter X Games.

At the 2014 Winter Olympics Howell started competition as a gold medal threat together with compatriot Kaya Turski. Turski was favoured ahead of her but was sick on the day of competition and crashed out in both of her qualifying runs, failing to make the final. In the final Howell had a successful first run scoring a 94.2, a run and score which would hold up as the eventual gold medal winner. Kim Lamarre a fellow Canadian finished in third to complete another two medal event for Canada at those Olympics. Howell, like many of the Canadian women in freestyle competition was close to freestyle skier Sarah Burke, who died while on a training run a few years before the sport was inaugurated as an Olympic event. Burke had coached Howell at Momentum Ski Camps in Whistler Blackcomb. She dedicated her victory to Burke saying "Oh, my God. I don't know what to say. I can't believe it. It is so surreal and I am so happy to win a gold medal for Canada. I don't think it will hit me until later. It is truly amazing. There are a number of really good girls out there and I came out on top. This is the best moment in my entire life...I said it earlier this week, I hope a Canadian brings home a gold medal for Sarah. I can't believe it's me. It's totally for Sarah and I cannot believe it."

Even though she was struggling with injuries and personal pressures after the 2014 Sochi Olympics, Howell still qualified and competed for Canada at the 2018 Olympic Winter Games in PyeongChang, South Korea.

Her 2018-2019 season was derailed by an injury at the Big Air World Cup in New Zealand, resulting in a torn anterior cruciate knee ligament. The injury required surgery, and Howell missed the rest of the season while she recovered.

She returned to competition in November 2019 at the Modena Skipass World Cup in Modena, Italy. After finishing in first place after Qualifying, Howell took home the Bronze medal.

== Personal life ==
Howell was born in Huntsville, Ontario. She attended Tawingo College and Huntsville Public School, and graduated from Huntsville High School. She also has taken courses with VLC. Howell has an older brother named Brett, and shared publicly about the personal challenges she faced after winning a Gold Medal at the 2014 Olympic Winter Games.
