= Keltie Hansen =

Canadian freestyle skier (born 1992)

Medal record

Women's Freestyle skiing

Representing Canada

FIS Freestyle World Ski Championships
Bronze medal – third place	2011 Deer Valley	Halfpipe

Keltie Hansen (born May 13, 1992) is a Canadian freestyle skier. She won a bronze medal in the halfpipe at the 2011 FIS Freestyle World Ski Championships.
