= Grete Eliassen =

American-Norwegian freestyle skier (born 1986)

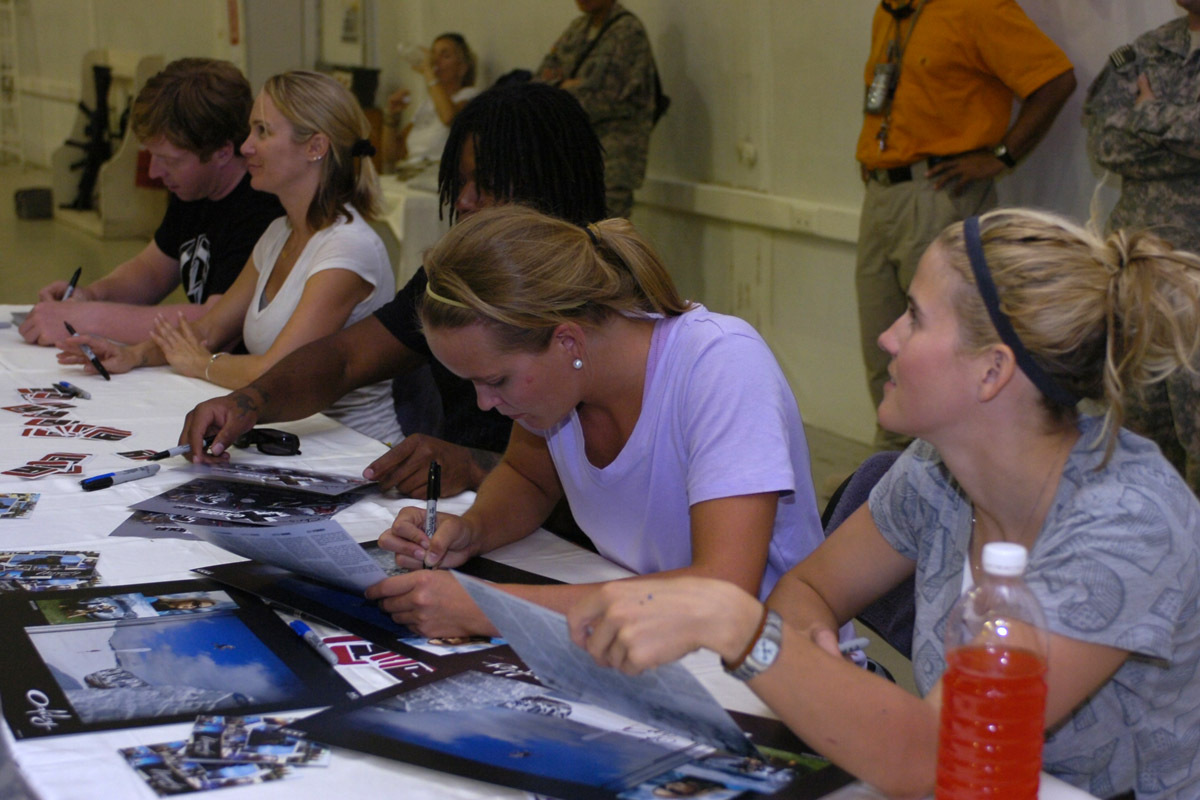
- ESPN X Games athletes Nate Holland, Jen O'Brien, Brad Simms, Grete Eliassen and Sarah Burke came to visit the 3rd Heavy Brigade Combat Team, 1st Cavalry Division at Forward Operating Base Marez, July 19. They signed autographs and talked with the troops.

Personal information
- Nationality: American and Norwegian
- Born: September 21, 1986 (age 39) Lutsen, Minnesota, U.S.
- Height: 5 ft 10 in (1.78 m)
- Website: www.greteeliassen.com

Sport
- Country: United States / Norway
- Sport: Freeskiing
Medal record
Women's freestyle skiing
FIS Freestyle World Ski Championships
Representing the United States
Bronze medal – third place	2013 Voss	Slopestyle
Representing Norway
Bronze medal – third place	2005 Ruka	Halfpipe
Winter X Games
Representing Norway
Bronze medal – third place	2011 Aspen	Slopestyle
Bronze medal – third place	2010 Aspen	Slopestyle
Silver medal – second place	2009 Aspen	Slopestyle
Silver medal – second place	2007 Aspen	Halfpipe
Gold medal – first place	2006 Aspen	Halfpipe
Gold medal – first place	2005 Aspen	Halfpipe
- Updated on 2 August 2013

Grete Eliassen (born September 21, 1986) is an American-Norwegian freestyle skier. She won a bronze medal in Slopestyle at the 2011 Winter X Games XV in Aspen, Colorado, behind Kaya Turski and Keri Herman. She has won six medals at the Winter X Games in slopestyle and halfpipe events including back to back gold medals in 2005 and 2006. Eliassen has been serving as the 16th president of the Women's Sports Foundation, effective January 2017.

== Early life ==
Eliassen was born in Lutsen, Minnesota to a Norwegian father and an American mother. She started skiing at the young age of two. She grew up near some of the finest mountains in North America. She moved to Norway for a year when she was five. When she returned to the United States, she started playing several different sports: hockey, soccer, basketball, tennis, water-skiing, baseball, cross country skiing, and alpine skiing. When she was 13, Eliassen moved to Lillehammer, Norway. She decided to continue her skiing career there.

== Career ==
A year after Eliassen moved back to Norway, she was named the Norwegian SL National Champion. Soon thereafter, she was selected to join the Norwegian Ski Team. She was on the team for two seasons. At the age of sixteen, Eliassen won the Super-G at the Junior World Championship in France and placed third in slalom skiing at the European Junior Olympics in Slovenia.

Eliassen realized that racing was not the type of skiing that satisfied her and soon after she fell in love with freeskiing. During her first year of competing in freeskiing, she took first place in the Rip Curl Free Ski and the US Open. Since she made her debut, she has won the US Open four times as well as achieved wins at Red Bull Cold Rush and the Dew Tour. She captured back to back gold medals at the Winter X Games. In addition, she has also won two silver and two bronze medals at the Winter X Games. She is the only female skier to medal in both the first Halfpipe and Slopestyle X Games events. In 2007, Eliassen won all the open events, US Open, European Open, and Nippon Open. She was named "Women Skier of the Decade" by Fri Flyt magazine.

From fall 2008 until spring 2010, Eliassen co-produced and was featured in the ski film "Say My Name" with one of her sponsors, Red Bull. She won ESPN Best Performance in a Leading Role and IF3 Montreal Best Female Performance for her role in the film.

In 2010, Eliassen broke the Hip Jump World Record. She reached speeds of 60 miles per hour downhill, hit the custom 30 foot hip feature, and soared more than 31 feet in the air. No woman has even come close to breaking her records.

=== Career highlights ===
- 2013 FIS World Championship, Slopestyle-3rd place
- 2011 Red Bull Cold Rush- 1st place
- 2011 Winter X Games, Slopestyle-3rd place
- 2010 Set Women's Hip Jump World Record
- 2010 Winter X Games, Slopestyle- 3rd place
- 2009 Winter X Games, Slopestyle- 2nd place
- 2007 US Freeskiing Open, Halfpipe- 1st place
- 2007 Winter X Games, Halfpipe- 2nd place
- 2006 Winter X Games, Halfpipe- 1st place
- 2006 US Open, Halfpipe-1st place
- 2005 FIS World Championships, Halfpipe-3rd place
- 2005 Winter X Games, Halfpipe-1st place
- 2005 US Open, Halfpipe- 1st place
- 2005 World FIS World Championships, Halfpipe -3rd place
- 2004 US Open, Halfpipe-1st place
- 2003 FIS Junior World Championships Super G-1st place
- 2003 European Junior Olympics, Slalom-3rd place

== Personal life ==
Eliassen now resides in Salt Lake City, Utah with her husband. She graduated from the University of Utah in May 2013 with a business marketing degree. She enjoys waterskiing, wakeboarding, golf, tennis, rock-climbing, skateboarding and biking when not skiing.

== Activism ==
Eliassen is also very involved within the community of female athletes. She is very passionate about giving young girls the same opportunities as boys when it comes to sports. In 2016 Eliassen was elected to serve as the president of the Women's Sports Foundation, serving as president from 2017 to 2018.
