= Keri Herman =

American freestyle skier

Personal information
- Full name: Keri Marie Herman
- Born: August 16, 1982 (age 43) Minneapolis, Minnesota, U.S.
- Height: 5 ft 7 in (170 cm)

Sport
- Sport: Skiing
Medal record
Women's freestyle skiing
Representing the United States
Winter X Games
Silver medal – second place	2010 Aspen	Slopestyle
Silver medal – second place	2011 Aspen	Slopestyle
Silver medal – second place	2015 Aspen	Slopestyle
Winter X Games Europe
Silver medal – second place	2010 Tignes	Slopestyle
Silver medal – second place	2011 Tignes	Slopestyle
Winter Dew Tour
Gold medal – first place	2014 Breckenridge	Slopestyle
Silver medal – second place	2010 Breckenridge	Slopestyle
Bronze medal – third place	2008 Breckenridge	Slopestyle
Bronze medal – third place	2009 Mt. Snow	Slopestyle
Grand Prix
Gold medal – first place	2013 Copper Mountain	Slopestyle
Gold medal – first place	2014 Breckenridge	Slopestyle
Silver medal – second place	2014 Park City	Slopestyle
World Cup
Gold medal – first place	2012 Ushuaia, Argentina	Slopestyle
FIS Freestyle World Ski Championships
Bronze medal – third place	2011 Park City	Slopestyle
Big Air
Bronze medal – third place	2012 Nine Queens	Big Air
Bronze medal – third place	2014 Nine Queens	Big Air

Keri Marie Herman (born August 16, 1982) is an American freestyle skier and US Olympian. She placed 10th in Slopestyle at the 2014 Sochi Games. She won a silver medal in Slopestyle at the 2011 Winter X Games XV in Aspen, Colorado, behind Kaya Turski. The following week, Herman took bronze at the 2011 FIS Freestyle World Ski Championships. Herman now holds a total of 5 Winter X Games medals. 3 in Aspen and 2 from European X Games in Tignes, France. Keri Herman grew up in Bloomington, MN. She played ice hockey during her four years at Visitation High School as Center for the Visitation Blazers team. She moved to CO to attend the University of Denver where she graduated in 2005 with a BSBA in Finance and Marketing. She studied abroad for a semester at the University of Queensland, Australia. She moved to Breckenridge in 2004 where she has since lived, traveling around the world competing in Slopestyle and Halfpipe skiing events. In 2011, she was named to the first US Freeskiing Slopestyle team. Her sponsors are ROCKSTAR Energy, Scott USA, Breckenridge Resort, HEAD SKIS, US Freeskiing, Buff, Jiberish, and Discrete.
