= Kaya Turski =

Canadian freestyle skier (born 1988)

Personal information
- Born: Hannah Kaya Turski; May 3, 1988 (age 38) Montreal, Quebec, Canada
- Height: 5 ft 5 in (165 cm)
- Weight: 120 lb (54 kg)
- Website: www.kayaturski.com/kaya.html

Sport
- Country: Canada
Medal record
Women's freestyle skiing
Representing Canada
FIS Freestyle World Ski Championships
Gold medal – first place	2013 Voss	Slopestyle
Silver medal – second place	2011 Deer Valley	Slopestyle
Winter X Games
Gold medal – first place	2010 Aspen	Slopestyle
Gold medal – first place	2010 Tignes	Slopestyle
Gold medal – first place	2011 Aspen	Slopestyle
Gold medal – first place	2011 Tignes	Slopestyle
Gold medal – first place	2012 Aspen	Slopestyle
Gold medal – first place	2012 Tignes	Slopestyle
Gold medal – first place	2013 Tignes	Slopestyle
Gold medal – first place	2014 Aspen	Slopestyle
Silver medal – second place	2013 Aspen	Slopestyle

Kaya Turski (born May 3, 1988) is a Canadian freestyle skier. She is an eight-time Winter X Games champion in Women's Ski slope style. At the 2010 Winter X Games XIV held in Aspen, she won her gold medal with the highest ever slopestyle score at a Winter X Games with 96.66. One week after she won the gold medal in Slopestyle at the 2011 Winter X Games XV in Aspen, Colorado, ahead of Keri Herman and Grete Eliassen, she captured the silver medal at the 2011 FIS Freestyle World Ski Championships, behind Anna Segal of Australia. In mid-2013, she tore her anterior cruciate ligament.

Involved in aggressive inline skating in her early teen years, Turski had limited experience in skiing when she moved to Whistler from Montreal to train in the sport, aged 17. She speaks English, French, and Polish. Her grandmother was a Polish skier who moved to Canada with her two sons after World War II.

Kaya currently resides in Montreal and Mammoth Lakes, CA. She participated in the 2014 Winter Olympic Games in Sochi.

On October 3, 2017, Turski announced her retirement from freestyle skiing.
