= FIS Freestyle World Ski Championships 2013 – Men's slopestyle =

The men's slopestyle competition of the FIS Freestyle World Ski Championships 2013 was held at Myrkdalen-Voss, Norway on March 8 (qualifying) and March 9 (final). 63 athletes from 23 countries competed.

== Qualification ==
The following are the results of the qualification.

Rank	Bib	Name	Country	Run 1	Run 2	Best	Notes
1	11	Nick Goepper	United States	94.2	87.4	94.2	Q
2	1	James Woods	Great Britain	85.6	92.0	92.0	Q
3	10	Oscar Wester	Sweden	83.0	87.6	87.6	Q
4	74	Andreas Håtveit	Norway	79.2	87.4	87.4	Q
5	17	Gus Kenworthy	United States	54.6	86.4	86.4	Q
6	14	Alex Schlopy	United States	77.6	85.8	85.8	Q
7	75	Per Kristian Hunder	Norway	85.6	30.0	85.6	Q
8	3	Tom Wallisch	United States	84.2	81.0	84.2	Q
9	70	JF Houle	Canada	63.8	81.2	81.2	Q
10	8	Christian Bieri	Switzerland	79.4	67.8	79.4	
11	20	Antoine Aselisse	France	75.0	79.2	79.2	Q
12	19	Sami Sakkinen	Finland	71.2	78.4	78.4	
13	5	Russ Henshaw	Australia	78.2	7.8	78.2	
14	13	Jules Bonnaire	France	75.4	30.6	75.4	Q
15	24	Beau-James Wells	New Zealand	64.2	74.4	74.4	Q
16	72	Johan Berg	Norway	73.8	74.2	74.2	
17	45	Aleksi Patja	Finland	72.8	73.2	73.2	
18	50	Boen Ferguson	Australia	70.4	72.2	72.2	
19	73	Aleksander Aurdal	Norway	15.8	71.6	71.6	
20	4	Jonas Hunziker	Switzerland	66.4	70.6	70.6	
21	29	Matthew Walker	United States	69.4	28.0	69.4	
22	53	Robin Holub	Czech Republic	55.6	67.0	67.0	
23	9	Laurent De Martin	Switzerland	58.2	66.0	66.0	
24	61	Edvards Lansmanis	Latvia	30.8	62.6	62.6	
25	22	Benedikt Mayr	Germany	62.4	17.0	62.4	
26	56	Szczepan Karpiel	Poland	59.0	61.8	61.8	
27	28	Victor Bérard	France	61.0	48.0	61.0	
28	42	Andrey Poluyakhtov	Russia	22.0	58.4	58.4	
29	40	Otso Raisanen	Finland	58.0	27.0	58.0	
30	33	Luca Tribondeau	Austria	10.0	56.6	56.6	
31	62	Jordan Houghton	Australia	13.2	54.6	54.6	
32	27	Hamish McDougall	New Zealand	54.4	34.6	54.4	
33	47	Anttu Oikkonen	Finland	53.4	10.2	53.4	
34	69	Rasmus Dalberg Joergensen	Denmark	52.8	21.8	52.8	
35	71	Bartlomiej Sibiga	Poland	50.0	52.6	52.6	
36	68	Florian Geyer	Germany	20.8	52.4	52.4	
37	16	Yu Yoneya	Japan	51.2	24.2	51.2	
38	25	Joey Van Der Meer	Netherlands	51.0	47.6	51.0	
39	55	Bine Zalohar	Slovenia	50.8	23.8	50.8	
40	51	Thomas Waddell	Australia	18.0	48.8	48.8	
41	52	Danil Kalachev	Russia	46.2	23.8	46.2	
42	12	Soushi Utagawa	Japan	44.0	38.8	44.0	
43	15	Elias Ambühl	Switzerland	44.0	29.8	44.0	
44	60	Robin Gillon	Netherlands	11.8	43.0	43.0	
45	65	Hans-Jakob Brandt Olsen	Denmark	22.0	42.6	42.6	
46	41	Zhachary Pham	Great Britain	21.8	42.4	42.4	
47	39	Paddy Graham	Great Britain	42.4	12.0	42.4	
48	64	Viliam Tomo	Slovakia	21.2	41.4	41.4	
49	46	Matic Lovko	Slovenia	35.0	37.2	37.2	
50	21	Marek Skala	Czech Republic	26.4	34.6	34.6	
51	38	Lucas Vianna	Brazil	4.8	34.2	34.2	
52	2	Alex Beaulieu-Marchand	Canada	20.0	32.8	32.8	
53	6	Henrik Harlaut	Sweden	30.6	DNS	30.6	
54	35	Jesper Tjäder	Sweden	28.8	26.0	28.8	
55	79	Niklas Eriksson	Sweden	27.4	25.6	27.4	
56	78	Pavel Korpachev	Russia	24.4	8.8	24.4	
57	57	Tyler Harding	Great Britain	9.0	21.8	21.8	
58	31	Josiah Wells	New Zealand	18.8	21.6	21.6	
59	67	Goo Won-Seok	South Korea	20.8	15.8	20.8	
60	23	Nick Rapley	New Zealand	14.4	DNS	14.4	
	77	Evgeni Vetoshkin	Russia	DNS	DNS	DNS	
	59	Sebastian Geiger	Germany	DNS	DNS	DNS	
	36	Dennis Ranalter	Austria	DNS	DNS	DNS	

== Final ==
The following are the results of the final.

Rank	Bib	Name	Country	Run 1	Run 2	Best
1st place, gold medalist(s)	3	Tom Wallisch	United States	91.0	94.8	94.8
2nd place, silver medalist(s)	1	James Woods	Great Britain	87.8	91.2	91.2
3rd place, bronze medalist(s)	11	Nick Goepper	United States	24.4	89.2	89.2
4	74	Andreas Håtveit	Norway	76.8	88.2	88.2
5	20	Antoine Aselisse	France	63.0	18.8	63.0
6	17	Gus Kenworthy	United States	28.8	61.6	61.6
7	10	Oscar Wester	Sweden	58.6	29.2	58.6
8	24	Beau-James Wells	New Zealand	53.4	50.8	53.4
9	75	Per Kristian Hunder	Norway	10.0	38.4	38.4
10	14	Alex Schlopy	United States	37.4	14.6	37.4
11	70	JF Houle	Canada	26.2	21.8	26.2
12	13	Jules Bonnaire	France	19.6	17.6	19.6
