= FIS Freestyle Ski and Snowboarding World Championships 2015 – Men's ski slopestyle =

The men's ski slopestyle competition of the FIS Freestyle Ski and Snowboarding World Championships 2015 was held at Kreischberg, Austria on January 20 (qualifying) and January 21 (finals). 48 athletes from 19 countries competed.

== Qualification ==
The following are the results of the qualification.

Rank	Heat	Bib	Name	Country	Run 1	Run 2	Best	Notes
1	1	3	Fabian Bösch	Switzerland	90.80	51.00	90.80	Q
2	1	1	Russell Henshaw	Australia	87.20	49.40	87.20	Q
3	1	7	Christian Bieri	Switzerland	84.00	28.00	84.00	Q
4	1	25	Viktor Thomas Moosmann	Austria	80.80	21.20	80.80	Q
5	1	5	Aleksander Aurdal	Norway	79.60	72.80	79.60	Q
6	1	34	Kristaps Thompson	Canada	68.40	79.40	79.40	
7	1	44	Taylor Wilson	Canada	57.80	79.00	79.00	
8	1	17	Matthew Walker	United States	78.80	20.00	78.80	
9	1	15	Ralph Welponer	Italy	73.80	78.00	78.00	
10	1	38	Miika Virkki	Finland	76.20	66.40	76.20	
11	1	29	Reid McEachran	Canada	74.20	17.40	74.20	
12	1	13	Felix Stridsberg-Usterud	Norway	74.00	71.40	74.00	
13	1	21	Aleksi Patja	Finland	73.40	27.20	73.40	
14	1	23	Christof Schenk	Italy	70.00	29.00	70.00	
15	1	40	Igor Lastei	Italy	67.20	60.40	67.20	
16	1	27	Daniel Antell	Finland	65.00	66.00	66.00	
17	1	11	Joona Kangas	Finland	25.80	63.20	63.20	
18	1	9	Johan Berg	Norway	60.20	20.80	60.20	
19	1	31	Simon Bartik	Czech Republic	16.00	55.20	55.20	
20	1	48	Samuel Ruttiman	Australia	21.80	50.60	50.60	
21	1	42	Viliam Tomo	Slovakia	22.40	DNS	22.40	
22	1	19	Hugo Laugier	France	20.80	18.20	20.80	
23	1	46	Harry Pettit	New Zealand	14.40	15.00	15.00	
	1	36	Szczepan Karpiel	Poland			DNS	
1	2	22	Robby Franco	United States	87.60	72.60	87.60	Q
2	2	4	Noah Wallace	United States	80.80	25.40	80.80	Q
3	2	10	Luca Tribondeau	Austria	79.60	63.20	79.60	Q
4	2	2	Jonas Hunziker	Switzerland	77.00	79.00	79.00	Q
5	2	41	Colby Stevenson	United States	78.40	13.60	78.40	Q
6	2	12	Jérémy Pancras	France	73.60	12.80	73.60	
7	2	6	Till Matti	Switzerland	71.20	73.00	73.00	
8	2	8	Antoine Adelisse	France	62.20	68.20	68.20	
9	2	30	Rasmus Dalberg Joergensen	Denmark	18.20	67.80	67.80	
10	2	18	Benedikt Mayr	Germany	29.00	67.00	67.00	
11	2	16	Klaus Finne	Norway	25.80	63.80	63.80	
12	2	45	Sebastian Geiger	Germany	50.60	63.20	63.20	
13	2	43	Quentin Ladame	France	53.60	62.40	62.40	
14	2	26	Robin Holub	Czech Republic	61.20	29.00	61.20	
15	2	39	Dmitry Makarov	Russia	58.60	48.00	58.60	
16	2	14	Simone Canal	Italy	19.20	57.80	57.80	
17	2	35	Pontus Nordstrom	Sweden	16.60	55.80	55.80	
18	2	20	Daniel Walchhofer	Australia	37.00	52.20	52.20	
19	2	37	Lukas Müllauer	Austria	48.40	51.80	51.80	
20	2	28	Danil Kalachev	Russia	38.40	15.80	38.40	
21	2	32	Marek Skala	Czech Republic	24.40	18.60	24.40	
22	2	24	Erik Lundmark	Sweden	24.00	24.00	24.00	
23	2	49	Guram Vashakmadze	Georgia	11.40	22.80	22.80	
24	2	47	Bine Zalohar	Slovenia	17.60	15.40	17.60	

== Final ==
The following are the results of the finals.

Rank	Bib	Name	Country	Run 1	Run 2	Run 3	Best
1st place, gold medalist(s)	3	Fabian Bösch	Switzerland	17.80	92.60	31.40	92.60
2nd place, silver medalist(s)	1	Russell Henshaw	Australia	90.60	91.80	90.00	91.80
3rd place, bronze medalist(s)	4	Noah Wallace	United States	82.40	24.40	73.80	82.40
4	25	Viktor Thomas Moosmann	Austria	75.00	81.20	36.80	81.20
5	2	Jonas Hunziker	Switzerland	68.80	79.00	53.60	79.00
6	22	Robby Franco	United States	72.40	78.20	78.60	78.60
7	10	Luca Tribondeau	Austria	19.60	77.40	30.20	77.40
8	41	Colby Stevenson	United States	58.00	43.80	71.80	71.80
9	5	Aleksander Aurdal	Norway	63.40	66.40	28.00	66.40
10	7	Christian Bieri	Switzerland				DNS
