= FIS Freestyle World Ski Championships 2011 – Men's slopestyle =

The men's slopestyle competition of the FIS Freestyle World Ski Championships 2011 was held at Park City Mountain Resort, Park City, Utah, United States on February 3, 2011 (qualifications and finals).

46 athletes from 16 countries competed.

== Results ==
=== Qualification ===
The following are the results of the qualification.

| Rank | Bib | Name | Country | Run 1 | Run 2 | Best Score | Note |
|---|---|---|---|---|---|---|---|
| 1 | 2 | Russ Henshaw | Australia | 34.20 | 43.10 | 43.10 | Q |
| 2 | 6 | Sam Carlson | United States | 42.90 | 41.90 | 42.90 | Q |
| 3 | 31 | James Woods | United Kingdom | 13.10 | 40.30 | 40.30 | Q |
| 4 | 50 | Jacob Wester | Sweden | 36.70 | 40.10 | 40.10 | Q |
| 5 | 44 | Aleksander Aurdal | Norway | 9.80 | 39.70 | 39.70 | Q |
| 6 | 27 | John Strenio | United States | 39.30 | 32.40 | 39.30 | Q |
| 7 | 48 | Thomas Dolplads | Norway | 39.20 | 9.60 | 39.20 | Q |
| 8 | 53 | Gus Kenworthy | United States | 38.60 | 35.90 | 38.60 | Q |
| 9 | 7 | Alex Schlopy | United States | 38.40 | 6.60 | 38.40 | Q |
| 10 | 40 | Jonas Hunziker | Switzerland | 37.40 | 38.10 | 38.10 | Q |
| 11 | 24 | Dane Tudor-Olds | Australia | 37.70 | 28.80 | 37.70 | |
| 12 | 3 | Elias Ambühl | Switzerland | 37.20 | 15.70 | 37.20 | |
| 13 | 38 | Jossi Wells | New Zealand | 35.90 | 36.50 | 36.50 | |
| 14 | 37 | Byron Wells | New Zealand | 20.70 | 36.00 | 36.00 | |
| 15 | 25 | Jamieson Irvine | Canada | 16.10 | 35.20 | 35.20 | |
| 16 | 52 | Elvis Harsheim Eidsvold | Norway | 35.10 | 32.50 | 35.10 | |
| 17 | 26 | Antti-Jussi Kemppainen | Finland | 11.90 | 33.00 | 33.00 | |
| 18 | 35 | Henri Koskelainen | Finland | 32.90 | 6.70 | 32.90 | |
| 19 | 28 | Roy Kittler | Germany | 28.70 | 32.10 | 32.10 | |
| 20 | 47 | Ian Cosco | Canada | 19.50 | 32.10 | 32.10 | |
| 21 | 54 | Hamish McDougall | New Zealand | 8.90 | 31.50 | 31.50 | |
| 22 | 18 | Scott Jordan David | Andorra | 31.10 | 8.90 | 31.10 | |
| 23 | 13 | Roman Dalecky | Czech Republic | 29.50 | 13.20 | 29.50 | |
| 24 | 16 | Matt Johnson | New Zealand | 17.70 | 28.70 | 28.70 | |
| 25 | 34 | Sebastian Geiger | Germany | 26.20 | 28.10 | 28.10 | |
| 26 | 14 | Max Heard | Canada | 23.90 | 26.10 | 26.10 | |
| 27 | 43 | Sami Sakkinen | Finland | 26.00 | 17.40 | 26.00 | |
| 28 | 51 | Zachary Pham | United Kingdom | 25.90 | 7.90 | 25.90 | |
| 29 | 32 | Bine Zalohar | Slovenia | 11.60 | 25.40 | 25.40 | |
| 30 | 39 | Julien Lange | France | 25.40 | 9.90 | 25.40 | |
| 31 | 20 | Robin Holub | Czech Republic | 25.30 | 17.40 | 25.30 | |
| 32 | 45 | Tobias Tritscher | Austria | 24.30 | 20.40 | 24.30 | |
| 33 | 23 | Florian Geyer | Germany | 24.00 | 21.00 | 24.00 | |
| 34 | 22 | Fabio Studer | Austria | 21.90 | 23.60 | 23.60 | |
| 35 | 46 | Dennis Dyg Hannesbo Joergensen | Denmark | 22.30 | 11.80 | 22.30 | |
| 36 | 12 | Rasmus Dalberg Joergensen | Denmark | 10.60 | 22.20 | 22.20 | |
| 37 | 10 | Jaeden Schneider-Clark | Canada | 10.00 | 21.20 | 21.20 | |
| 38 | 55 | Oscar Scherlin | Sweden | 17.30 | 19.70 | 19.70 | |
| 39 | 42 | Filip Taraba | Czech Republic | 16.00 | 14.50 | 16.00 | |
| 40 | 9 | Hans-Jakob Brandt Olsen | Denmark | 11.00 | 10.10 | 11.00 | |
| 41 | 33 | Benedikt Mayr | Germany | 10.20 | 8.60 | 10.20 | |
| 42 | 41 | Matic Lovko | Slovenia | 5.40 | 7.60 | 7.60 | |
| 43 | 29 | Jarkko Ronkainen | Finland | 6.70 | 6.90 | 6.90 | |
| | 11 | Klaus Finne | Norway | | | | DNS |
| | 17 | Andrew Matthew | United Kingdom | | | | DNS |
| | 36 | Thomas Krief | France | | | | DNS |

=== Final ===
| Rank | Bib | Name | Country | Run 1 | Run 2 | Best Score | Notes |
|---|---|---|---|---|---|---|---|
| 1st place, gold medalist(s) | 7 | Alex Schlopy | United States | 27.50 | 41.80 | 41.80 | |
| 2nd place, silver medalist(s) | 6 | Sam Carlson | United States | 38.70 | 41.50 | 41.50 | |
| 3rd place, bronze medalist(s) | 2 | Russ Henshaw | Australia | 39.80 | 41.20 | 41.20 | |
| 4 | 48 | Thomas Dolplads | Norway | 40.60 | 25.70 | 40.60 | |
| 5 | 50 | Jacob Wester | Sweden | 35.10 | 37.70 | 37.70 | |
| 6 | 27 | John Strenio | United States | 12.40 | 37.30 | 37.30 | |
| 7 | 44 | Aleksander Aurdal | Norway | 37.10 | 36.70 | 37.10 | |
| 8 | 31 | James Woods | United Kingdom | 18.60 | 35.00 | 35.00 | |
| 9 | 40 | Jonas Hunziker | Switzerland | 11.20 | 34.90 | 34.90 | |
| 10 | 53 | Gus Kenworthy | United States | 19.50 | 12.30 | 19.50 | |
