= Polartec Big Air at Fenway =

Polartec Big Air At Fenway
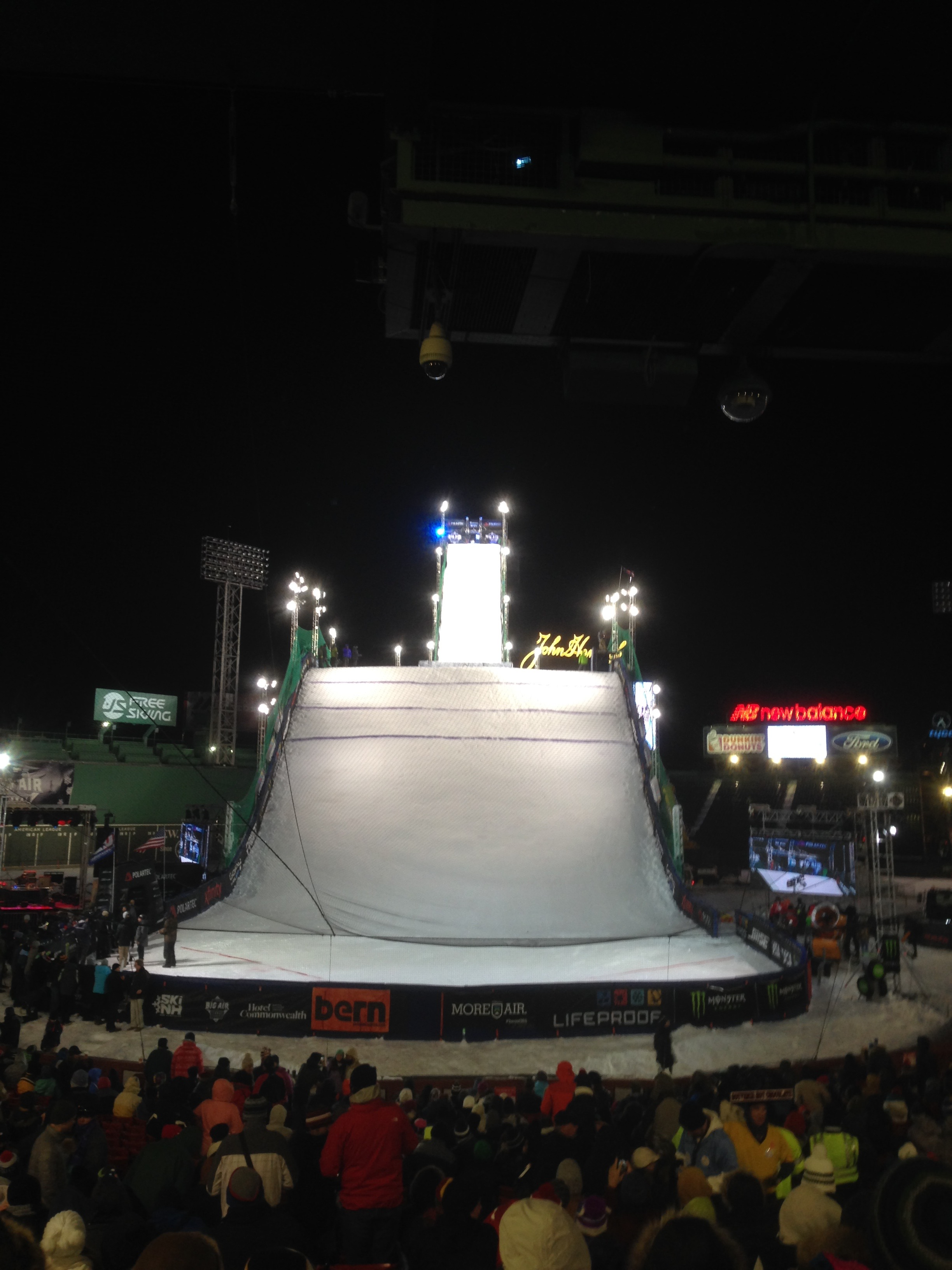
- The 140 foot big air jump inside Fenway
- Years active: 2016
- Organization: Polartec
- Style: Big Air Competition
- Height: 150 ft (4,572 cm)
- Opponents: Sage Kostenburg; Ty Walker; Joss Christensen

Polartec Big Air At Fenway is a big air snowboarding and skiing competition that took place on February 11–12, 2016. The spectacle was held at Fenway Park in Boston, Massachusetts, USA. This is the first such event held at Fenway Park and was part of the U.S. Grand Prix Tour and the International Ski Federation's World Tour. A 25,000 person audience was expected over the course of the two days. The Winter clothing brand, Polartec, chose to sign on as the title sponsor. Polartec's North American Marketing Manager, Darren Jorsey, stated, "We want to continue to invest in the sports that push the boundaries of athletes and their apparel”.

== Construction ==
According to Eric Webster, the spokesman from the US Ski & Snowboard Association, "The structure itself, when completed, will stretch from the outfield all the way to home plate, basically." The structure stood above the lights as the tallest object within the arena. Competitors had to climb several flights of stairs or ride an industrial elevator to reach the top of the jump. The jump, when completed, was approximately 140 feet high, 430 feet long, and set at a 38 degree incline. Riders were able to reach speeds up to 40 miles per hour and needed to use that momentum to clear the 70 foot gap between the takeoff and landing.

The rather warm 2015-2016 winter in Boston was an additional complication, making it difficult to keep quality snow on the ramp. According to New Boston Post, "Snowmaking is being handled by Killington Resort in Vermont in conjunction with HKD Snowmakers from Natick, which manufactures snowmaking equipment. The snow will be applied to the ramp both manually and with the help of a 275-ton crane." The snow was made and stored between 11 pm and 5 am (the coldest part of the day) to be later installed on the structure, jump, and landing.

The jump was primarily constructed from steel planking and proprietary scaffolding. It was expected to take 4–5 days to tear the entire structure down.

== Competitors ==
The event caught the attention of many elite winter athletes. As a result, many of the top Winter Olympic and X Games athletes signed on immediately. Some of the big names that competed are Ty Walker, Joss Christensen, and Sage Kostenburg. A more comprehensive list is below:

Snowboard: Sage Kotsenburg, Chas Guldemond, Jamie Anderson, Ty Walker, Eric Willett, Eric Beauchemin, Jessika Jenson, Karly Shorr, Brandon Davis, Lyon Farrell, Kyle Mack, Brett Moody, Ryan Stassel, Seppe Smits, Tyler Nicholson, Max Parrot, Ella Suitiala, Silva Mittermueller, Cheryl Maas, Urska Pribosic, Lia-Marie Boesch, Sina Candrian, Elena Koenz, Jonas Boesiger.

Ski: Devin Logan, Bobby Brown, Joss Christensen, Gus Kenworthy, Maggie Voisin, Keri Herman, Nadia Gonzales, Lyman Currier, Nicholas Goepper, Thomas Wallisch, McRae Williams, Russell Henshaw, Luca Tribondeau, Evan McEachran, Isabel Atkin, James Woods, Katie Summerhayes, Lisa Zimmermann, Silvia Bertagna, Johanne Killi, Tiril Sjaastad Christiansen, Oystein Braaten, Josiah Wells, Giulia Tanno, Elias Ambuehl, Andri Ragettli, Emma Dahlstrom, Oscar Wester.

== Results ==
Polartec Big Air At Fenway Finalists
Women Finalists			Men Finalists		
Name	Place	Score	Name	Place	Score
Lisa Zimmermann	1st	173.20	Vincent Gagnier	1st	185
Emma Dahlstrom	2nd	173	Andri Ragetti	2nd	183
Tiril Sjaastad Christiansen	3rd	160.80	Jonas Hunziker	3rd	176.80

== Concert & Film ==
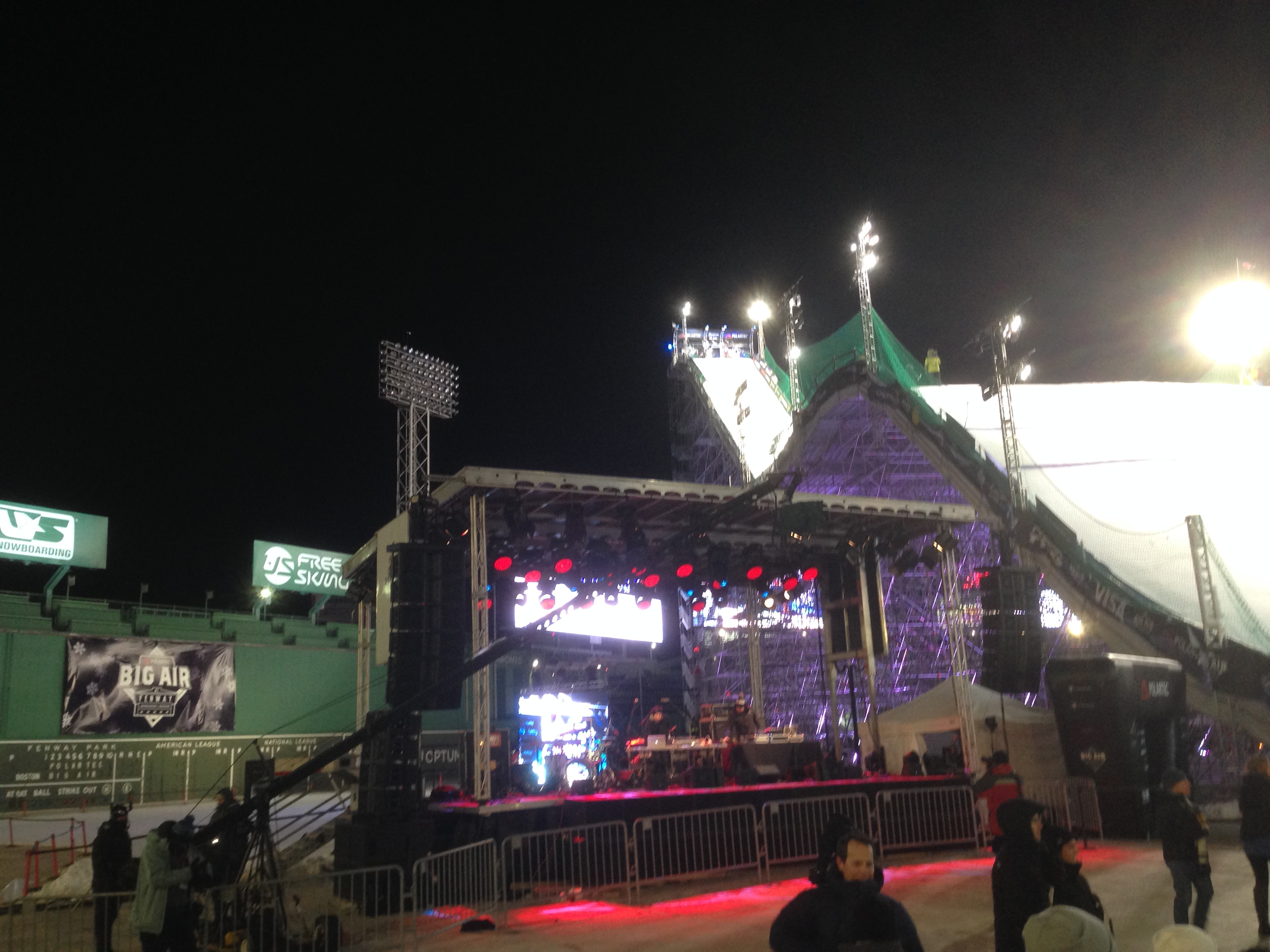
Concert stage inside Fenway at Polartec Big Air competition

American Authors, Bad Rabbits, and DJ Master Millions were all selected to perform for the entertainment portion of Big Air at Fenway. DJ Master Millions played at the beginning of each night. Bad Rabbits took the stage after the finals on Thursday night, February 11, 2016. American Authors concluded the entirety of the event and performed after the finals on Friday night, February 12, 2016.

Bad Rabbits is a Boston-based band and has shared the stage with T-Pain, John Legend, and the Wu Tang Clan. American Authors first formed in Boston's Berklee College of Music and their breakout song is "Best Day Of My Life".

Teton Gravity Research also premiered their new film, The Sammy C Project. The Sammy C Project presented two years of the creators' snowboarding/skiing experiences in locations such as Mt Hood, Alaska, Michigan's Copper Peak, and more. The showing took place at 6:30 pm on the final night of Big Air at Fenway.
