= 2017–18 FIS Freestyle Ski World Cup =

Freestyle skiing competitive season

Freestyle Ski World Cup 2017/18
Discipline	Men	Women
Overall	(Canada) Mikaël Kingsbury (7)	(Sweden) Sandra Näslund
Moguls	(Canada) Mikaël Kingsbury (7)	(France) Perrine Laffont
Aerials	(Russia) Maxim Burov	(China) Xu Mengtao (2)
Ski Cross	(Switzerland) Marc Bischofberger	(Sweden) Sandra Näslund
Halfpipe	(United States) Alex Ferreira	(Canada) Cassie Sharpe
Slopestyle	(Switzerland) Andri Ragettli (2)	(Sweden) Jennie-Lee Burmansson
Big Air	(Norway) Christian Nummedal	(Italy) Silvia Bertagna
Cross Alps Tour	(Switzerland) Marc Bischofberger	(Sweden) Sandra Näslund
Nations Cup	Canada	Canada
- Nations Cup overall: Canada (10)

Competition
Locations	33	33
Individual	46	46
Cancelled	2	2

The 2017/18 FIS Freestyle Ski World Cup was the thirty ninth World Cup season in freestyle skiing organised by International Ski Federation. The season started on 27 August 2017 ended on 24 March 2018. This season included six disciplines: moguls, aerials, ski cross, halfpipe, slopestyle and big air.

== Men ==
=== Ski Cross ===
Num	Season	Date	Place	Event	Winner	Second	Third	Ref.
133	1	7 December 2017	(France) Val Thorens	SX	(Canada) Christopher Del Bosco	(France) Arnaud Bovolenta	(France) Terence Tchiknavorian	
		9 December 2017	(France) Val Thorens	SX	cancelled; heavy snow, fog and wind			
134	2	12 December 2017	(Switzerland) Arosa	SX	(Sweden) Viktor Andersson	(Canada) Kevin Drury	(Sweden) Victor Öhling Norberg	
135	3	15 December 2017	(Austria) Montafon	SX	(Russia) Sergey Ridzik	(France) Terence Tchiknavorian	(France) Jean-Frédéric Chapuis	
136	4	21 December 2017	(Italy) Innichen	SX	(Switzerland) Marc Bischofberger	(Austria) Christoph Wahrstötter	(Austria) Thomas Zangerl	
137	5	22 December 2017	(Italy) Innichen	SX	(Switzerland) Marc Bischofberger	(Sweden) Viktor Andersson	(Switzerland) Alex Fiva	
2nd Cross Alps Tour Overall (8–22 December 2017)					(Switzerland) Marc Bischofberger	(France) Terence Tchiknavorian	(Sweden) Viktor Andersson	
138	6	13 January 2018	(Sweden) Idre	SX	(Switzerland) Alex Fiva	(Switzerland) Marc Bischofberger	(France) Jean-Frédéric Chapuis	
139	7	14 January 2018	(Sweden) Idre	SX	(France) Jean-Frédéric Chapuis	(Switzerland) Alex Fiva	(France) Jonas Devouassoux	
140	8	20 January 2018	(Canada) Nakiska	SX	(Germany) Paul Eckert	(Austria) Christoph Wahrstoetter	(Switzerland) Marc Bischofberger	
141	9	3 March 2018	(Russia) Sunny Valley	SX	(Switzerland) Jonas Lenherr	(Canada) Kevin Drury	(France) Jean-Frédéric Chapuis	
142	10	4 March 2018	(Russia) Sunny Valley	SX	(Canada) Kevin Drury	(Switzerland) Jonas Lenherr	(Slovenia) Filip Flisar	
		17 March 2018	(France) Megève	SX	cancelled due to heavy snow			

=== Moguls ===
Num	Season	Date	Place	Event	Winner	Second	Third	Ref.
325	1	9 December 2017	(Finland) Ruka	MO	(Canada) Mikaël Kingsbury	(Kazakhstan) Dmitriy Reiherd	(Kazakhstan) Pavel Kolmakov	
326	2	21 December 2017	(China) Thaiwoo	MO	(Canada) Mikaël Kingsbury	(Australia) Matt Graham	(United States) Troy Murphy	
327	3	22 December 2017	(China) Thaiwoo	MO	(Canada) Mikaël Kingsbury	(Kazakhstan) Dmitriy Reiherd	(Australia) Matt Graham	
328	4	6 January 2018	(Canada) Calgary	MO	(Canada) Mikaël Kingsbury	(Kazakhstan) Dmitriy Reiherd	(Australia) Matt Graham	
329	5	10 January 2018	(United States) Deer Valley	MO	(Canada) Mikaël Kingsbury	(Japan) Sho Endo	(United States) Bradley Wilson	
330	6	11 January 2018	(United States) Deer Valley	MO	(Canada) Mikaël Kingsbury	(Kazakhstan) Dmitriy Reiherd	(Australia) Matt Graham	
331	7	20 January 2018	(Canada) Tremblant	MO	(Japan) Ikuma Horishima	(Canada) Mikaël Kingsbury	(Kazakhstan) Dmitriy Reiherd	
332	8	3 March 2018	(Japan) Tazawako	MO	(Japan) Ikuma Horishima	(Canada) Mikaël Kingsbury	(Kazakhstan) Dmitriy Reiherd	
68	1	4 March 2018	(Japan) Tazawako	DM	(Japan) Ikuma Horishima	(Canada) Mikaël Kingsbury	(Kazakhstan) Dmitriy Reiherd	
		10 March 2018	(Switzerland) Airolo	DM	cancelled due to heavy fog, not rescheduled			
69	2	18 March 2018	(France) Megève	DM	(Canada) Mikaël Kingsbury	(France) Benjamin Cavet	(United States) Bradley Wilson	

=== Slopestyle ===
Num	Season	Date	Place	Event	Winner	Second	Third	Ref.
23	1	27 August 2017	(New Zealand) Cardrona	SS	(United Kingdom) James Woods	(Switzerland) Andri Ragettli	(Switzerland) Fabian Bösch	
24	2	26 November 2017	(Austria) Stubai	SS	(Norway) Øystein Bråten	(Canada) Evan McEachran	(United States) Colby Stevenson	
25	3	23 December 2017	(France) Font-Romeu	SS	(Sweden) Oscar Wester	(Norway) Ferdinand Dahl	(Norway) Øystein Bråten	
26	4	13 January 2018	(United States) Snowmass	SS	(Switzerland) Andri Ragettli	(Norway) Ferdinand Dahl	(Norway) Øystein Bråten	
27	5	21 January 2018	(United States) Mammoth Mountain	SS	(Canada) Teal Harle	(Switzerland) Andri Ragettli	(Canada) Evan McEachran	
28	6	3 March 2018	(Switzerland) Silvaplana	SS	(United States) Alexander Hall	(Switzerland) Andri Ragettli	(Norway) Ferdinand Dahl	
29	7	16 March 2018	(Italy) Seiser Alm	SS	(United States) Nick Goepper	(Switzerland) Andri Ragettli	(United Kingdom) James Woods	
		25 March 2018	(Canada) Stoneham/Quebec	SS	cancelled			

=== Halfpipe ===
Num	Season	Date	Place	Event	Winner	Second	Third	Ref.
38	1	1 September 2017	(New Zealand) Cardrona	HP	(United States) Alex Ferreira	(France) Kévin Rolland	(Canada) Simon d'Artois	
39	2	8 December 2017	(United States) Copper Mountain	HP	(United States) David Wise	(Canada) Noah Bowman	(Canada) Simon d'Artois	
40	3	22 December 2017	(China) Beijing/Secret Garden	HP	(France) Thomas Krief	(Switzerland) Joel Gisler	(Switzerland) Robin Briguet	
41	4	12 January 2018	(United States) Snowmass	HP	(United States) David Wise	(United States) Alex Ferreira	(United States) Aaron Blunck	
42	5	19 January 2018	(United States) Mammoth Mountain	HP	(United States) Kyle Smaine	(United States) Alex Ferreira	(United States) Torin Yater-Wallace	
		17 March 2018	(Austria) Kühtai	HP	cancelled			
43	6	22 March 2018	(France) Tignes	HP	(Canada) Noah Bowman	(United States) Alex Ferreira	(Canada) Simon d'Artois	

=== Aerials ===
Num	Season	Date	Place	Event	Winner	Second	Third	Ref.
325	1	16 December 2017	(China) Beijing/Secret Garden	AE	(China) Jia Zongyang	(Belarus) Maxim Gustik	(Canada) Lewis Irving	
326	2	17 December 2017	(China) Beijing/Secret Garden	AE	(China) Jia Zongyang	(China) Qi Guangpu	(Belarus) Anton Kushnir	
327	3	6 January 2018	(Russia) Moscow	AE	(Belarus) Anton Kushnir	(Russia) Ilya Burov	(Russia) Stanislav Nikitin	
328	4	12 January 2018	(United States) Deer Valley	AE	(Russia) Maxim Burov	(China) Qi Guangpu	(Belarus) Anton Kushnir	
329	5	19 January 2018	(United States) Lake Placid	AE	(China) Jia Zongyang	(Ukraine) Oleksandr Abramenko	(Canada) Olivier Rochon	
330	6	20 January 2018	(United States) Lake Placid	AE	(Russia) Maxim Burov	(Belarus) Anton Kushnir	(Japan) Naoya Tabara	

=== Big Air ===
Num	Season	Date	Place	Event	Winner	Second	Third	Ref.
		5 August 2017	(Chile) El Colorado	BA	cancelled			
		3 November 2017	(Denmark) Copenhagen	BA	cancelled			
8	1	18 November 2017	(Italy) Milan	BA	(Switzerland) Elias Ambühl	(Sweden) Hugo Burvall	(Switzerland) Andri Ragettli	
9	2	1 December 2017	(Germany) Mönchengladbach	BA	(Norway) Christian Nummedal	(Sweden) Oscar Wester	(Norway) Oystein Braaten	
10	3	24 March 2018	(Canada) Stoneham/Quebec	BA	(Norway) Christian Nummedal	(Sweden) Hugo Burvall	(Canada) Teal Harle	

== Ladies ==
=== Ski Cross ===
Num	Season	Date	Place	Event	Winner	Second	Third	Ref.
134	1	7 December 2017	(France) Val Thorens	SX	(Sweden) Sandra Näslund	(Germany) Heidi Zacher	(Canada) Kelsey Serwa	
		9 December 2017	(France) Val Thorens	SX	cancelled; heavy snow, fog and wind			
135	2	12 December 2017	(Switzerland) Arosa	SX	(Sweden) Sandra Näslund	(Germany) Heidi Zacher	(Canada) Brittany Phelan	
136	3	15 December 2017	(Austria) Montafon	SX	(Switzerland) Fanny Smith	(Germany) Heidi Zacher	(Sweden) Sandra Näslund	
137	4	21 December 2017	(Italy) Innichen	SX	(Germany) Heidi Zacher	(Canada) Georgia Simmerling	(Sweden) Sandra Näslund	
138	5	22 December 2017	(Italy) Innichen	SX	(Sweden) Sandra Näslund	(France) Marielle Berger-Sabbatel	(Germany) Heidi Zacher	
2nd Cross Alps Tour Overall (8–22 December 2017)					(Sweden) Sandra Näslund	(Germany) Heidi Zacher	(Canada) Georgia Simmerling	
139	6	13 January 2018	(Sweden) Idre	SX	(Sweden) Sandra Näslund	(France) Marielle Berger-Sabbatel	(Canada) India Sherret	
140	7	14 January 2018	(Sweden) Idre	SX	(Sweden) Sandra Näslund	(Switzerland) Fanny Smith	(Germany) Heidi Zacher	
141	8	20 January 2018	(Canada) Nakiska	SX	(Sweden) Sandra Näslund	(France) Marielle Berger-Sabbatel	(France) Alizée Baron	
142	9	3 March 2018	(Russia) Sunny Valley	SX	(Switzerland) Fanny Smith	(Canada) Brittany Phelan	(Austria) Katrin Ofner	
143	10	4 March 2018	(Russia) Sunny Valley	SX	(Sweden) Sandra Näslund	(Canada) Brittany Phelan	(Switzerland) Fanny Smith	
		17 March 2018	(France) Megève	SX	cancelled due to heavy snow			

=== Moguls ===
Num	Season	Date	Place	Event	Winner	Second	Third	Ref.
326	1	9 December 2017	(Finland) Ruka	MO	(Australia) Britteny Cox	(Canada) Audrey Robichaud	(Russia) Marika Pertakhiya	
327	2	21 December 2017	(China) Thaiwoo	MO	(United States) Jaelin Kauf	(Kazakhstan) Yulia Galysheva	(Canada) Andi Naude	
328	3	22 December 2017	(China) Thaiwoo	MO	(Kazakhstan) Yulia Galysheva	(United States) Jaelin Kauf	(Canada) Andi Naude	
329	4	6 January 2018	(Canada) Calgary	MO	(Australia) Britteny Cox	(France) Perrine Laffont	(Canada) Justine Dufour-Lapointe	
330	5	10 January 2018	(United States) Deer Valley	MO	(France) Perrine Laffont	(United States) Jaelin Kauf	(United States) Morgan Schild	
331	6	11 January 2018	(United States) Deer Valley	MO	(United States) Jaelin Kauf	(France) Perrine Laffont	(United States) Morgan Schild	
332	7	20 January 2018	(Canada) Tremblant	MO	(Canada) Justine Dufour-Lapointe	(Canada) Andi Naude	(Kazakhstan) Yulia Galysheva	
333	8	3 March 2018	(Japan) Tazawako	MO	(France) Perrine Laffont	(Canada) Justine Dufour-Lapointe	(United States) Keaton McCargo	
67	1	4 March 2018	(Japan) Tazawako	DM	(United States) Tess Johnson	(Australia) Britteny Cox	(Germany) Laura Grasemann	
		10 March 2018	(Switzerland) Airolo	DM	cancelled due to heavy fog, not rescheduled			
68	2	18 March 2018	(France) Megève	DM	(United States) Jaelin Kauf	(France) Perrine Laffont	(Canada) Justine Dufour-Lapointe	

=== Slopestyle ===
Num	Season	Date	Place	Event	Winner	Second	Third	Ref.
23	1	27 August 2017	(New Zealand) Cardrona	SS	(Estonia) Kelly Sildaru	(Switzerland) Giulia Tanno	(Sweden) Jennie-Lee Burmansson	
24	2	26 November 2017	(Austria) Stubai	SS	(Sweden) Jennie-Lee Burmansson	(United Kingdom) Katie Summerhayes	(United States) Caroline Claire	
25	3	23 December 2017	(France) Font-Romeu	SS	(France) Tess Ledeux	(Sweden) Jennie-Lee Burmansson	(Norway) Tiril Sjåstad Christiansen	
26	4	13 January 2018	(United States) Snowmass	SS	(Norway) Johanne Killi	(United States) Maggie Voisin	(United Kingdom) Isabel Atkin	
27	5	21 January 2018	(United States) Mammoth Mountain	SS	(Norway) Tiril Sjåstad Christiansen	(Sweden) Jennie-Lee Burmansson	(United States) Caroline Claire	
28	6	3 March 2018	(Switzerland) Silvaplana	SS	(France) Tess Ledeux	(Norway) Johanne Killi	(Sweden) Jennie-Lee Burmansson	
29	7	16 March 2018	(Italy) Seiser Alm	SS	(United States) Caroline Claire	(United Kingdom) Isabel Atkin	(Canada) Yuki Tsubota	
		25 March 2018	(Canada) Stoneham/Quebec	SS	cancelled			

=== Halfpipe ===
Num	Season	Date	Place	Event	Winner	Second	Third	Ref.
38	1	1 September 2017	(New Zealand) Cardrona	HP	(Canada) Cassie Sharpe	(Estonia) Kelly Sildaru	(France) Marie Martinod	
39	2	8 December 2017	(United States) Copper Mountain	HP	(France) Marie Martinod	(United States) Devin Logan	(China) Zhang Kexin	
40	3	22 December 2017	(China) Beijing/Secret Garden	HP	(China) Zhang Kexin	(Japan) Yurie Watabe	(Russia) Valeriya Demidova	
41	4	12 January 2018	(United States) Snowmass	HP	(Canada) Cassie Sharpe	(United States) Brita Sigourney	(Japan) Ayana Onozuka	
42	5	19 January 2018	(United States) Mammoth Mountain	HP	(United States) Brita Sigourney	(United States) Maddie Bowman	(United States) Devin Logan	
		17 March 2018	(Austria) Kühtai	HP	cancelled			
43	6	22 March 2018	(France) Tignes	HP	(Canada) Cassie Sharpe	(France) Marie Martinod	(United States) Brita Sigourney	

=== Aerials ===
Num	Season	Date	Place	Event	Winner	Second	Third	Ref.
328	1	16 December 2017	(China) Beijing/Secret Garden	AE	(Belarus) Hanna Huskova	(China) Xu Mengtao	(United States) Ashley Caldwell	
329	2	17 December 2017	(China) Beijing/Secret Garden	AE	(Australia) Danielle Scott	(China) Xu Mengtao	(Russia) Kristina Spiridonova	
330	3	6 January 2018	(Russia) Moscow	AE	(United States) Kiley McKinnon	(Belarus) Aliaksandra Ramanouskaya	(Russia) Alexandra Orlova	
331	4	12 January 2018	(United States) Deer Valley	AE	(China) Xu Mengtao	(Russia) Kristina Spiridonova	(China) Kong Fanyu	
332	5	19 January 2018	(United States) Lake Placid	AE	(Australia) Lydia Lassila	(Belarus) Hanna Huskova	(Australia) Laura Peel	
333	6	20 January 2018	(United States) Lake Placid	AE	(China) Xu Mengtao	(Australia) Lydia Lassila	(Australia) Laura Peel	

=== Big Air ===
Num	Season	Date	Place	Event	Winner	Second	Third	Ref.
		5 August 2017	(Chile) El Colorado	BA	cancelled			
		3 November 2017	(Denmark) Copenhagen	BA	cancelled			
8	1	18 November 2017	(Italy) Milan	BA	(France) Coline Ballet Baz	(Norway) Johanne Killi	(Switzerland) Giulia Tanno	
9	2	1 December 2017	(Germany) Mönchengladbach	BA	(Switzerland) Giulia Tanno	(Switzerland) Sarah Höfflin	(Chile) Dominique Ohaco	
10	3	24 March 2018	(Canada) Stoneham//Quebec	BA	(Canada) Dara Howell	(Italy) Silvia Bertagna	(Canada) Megan Cressey	

== Team ==
Num	Season	Date	Place	Event	Winner	Second	Third	Ref.
5	1	17 December 2017	(China) Beijing/Secret Garden	AET	China Xu Mengtao; Qi Guangpu; Jia Zongyang	Australia Samantha Wells; Danielle Scott; David Morris	Russia Liubov Nikitina; Ilya Burov; Maxim Burov	

== Men's standings ==
=== Overall ===
Rank	after all 42 races	Points
1	(Canada) Mikaël Kingsbury	94.00
2	(United States) Alex Ferreira	60.33
3	(Switzerland) Andri Ragettli	60.00
4	(Russia) Maxim Burov	59.17
5	(Kazakhstan) Dmitriy Reikherd	58.50

=== Ski Cross ===
Rank	after all 10 races	Points
1	(Switzerland) Marc Bischofberger	462
2	(France) Jean-Frédéric Chapuis	403
3	(Canada) Kevin Drury	398
4	(Switzerland) Alex Fiva	349
5	(Russia) Sergey Ridzik	325

=== Moguls ===
Rank	after all 10 races	Points
1	(Canada) Mikaël Kingsbury	940
2	(Kazakhstan) Dmitriy Reikherd	585
3	(Japan) Ikuma Horishima	441
4	(Japan) Shō Endō	342
5	(Australia) Matt Graham	334

=== Slopestyle ===
Rank	after all 7 races	Points
1	(Switzerland) Andri Ragettli	420
2	(Norway) Ferdinand Dahl	277
3	(Sweden) Oscar Wester	272
4	(United Kingdom) James Woods	229
5	(Norway) Øystein Bråten	225

=== Halfpipe ===
Rank	after all 6 races	Points
1	(United States) Alex Ferreira	362
2	(United States) David Wise	279
3	(Canada) Noah Bowman	230
4	(Canada) Simon d'Artois	204
5	(United States) Birk Irving	192

=== Aerials ===
Rank	after all 6 events	Points
1	(Russia) Maxim Burov	355
2	(China) Jia Zongyang	329
3	(Belarus) Anton Kushnir	320
4	(Belarus) Maxim Gustik	267
5	(China) Qi Guangpu	254

=== Big Air ===
Rank	after all 3 races	Points
1	(Norway) Christian Nummedal	229
2	(Switzerland) Elias Ambühl	179
3	(Sweden) Hugo Burvall	174
4	(Switzerland) Jonas Hunziker	121
5	(Finland) Elias Syrjä	115

=== Cross Alps Tour ===
Rank	after all 5 races	Points
1	(Switzerland) Marc Bischofberger	302
2	(France) Terence Tchiknavorian	216
3	(Sweden) Viktor Andersson	211
4	(Russia) Sergey Ridzik	194
5	(Canada) Kevin Drury	159

== Ladies' standings ==
=== Overall ===
Rank	after all 42 races	Points
1	(Sweden) Sandra Näslund	87.00
2	(China) Xu Mengtao	67.50
3	(Sweden) Jennie-Lee Burmansson	64.14
4	(France) Perrine Laffont	60.70
5	(Belarus) Hanna Huskova	60.17

=== Ski Cross ===
Rank	after all 10 races	Points
1	(Sweden) Sandra Näslund	870
2	(Switzerland) Fanny Smith	539
3	(Canada) Brittany Phelan	489
4	(Germany) Heidi Zacher	474
5	(France) Marielle Berger-Sabbatel	422

=== Moguls ===
Rank	after all 10 races	Points
1	(France) Perrine Laffont	607
2	(Australia) Britteny Cox	561
3	(United States) Jaelin Kauf	467
4	(Canada) Andi Naude	462
5	(Canada) Justine Dufour-Lapointe	454

=== Slopestyle ===
Rank	after all 7 races	Points
1	(Sweden) Jennie-Lee Burmansson	449
2	(Norway) Johanne Killi	270
3	(United States) Caroline Claire	245
4	(France) Tess Ledeux	236
5	(Russia) Anastasia Tatalina	230

=== Halfpipe ===
Rank	after all 6 races	Points
1	(Canada) Cassie Sharpe	329
2	(United States) Brita Sigourney	306
3	(China) Zhang Kexin	264
4	(United States) Maddie Bowman	260
5	(France) Marta Martinod	241

=== Aerials ===
Rank	after all 6 events	Points
1	(China) Xu Mengtao	405
2	(Belarus) Hanna Huskova	361
3	(Russia) Kristina Spiridonova	237
4	(Belarus) Aliaksandra Ramanouskaya	211
5	(Australia) Lydia Lassila	200

=== Big Air ===
Rank	after all 3 races	Points
1	(Italy) Silvia Bertagna	162
2	(Switzerland) Giulia Tanno	160
3	(Chile) Dominique Ohaco	155
4	(Switzerland) Sarah Höfflin	130
5	(France) Coline Ballet Baz	100
5	(Canada) Dara Howell	100

=== Cross Alps Tour ===
Rank	after all 5 races	Points
1	(Sweden) Sandra Näslund	420
2	(Germany) Heidi Zacher	385
3	(Canada) Georgia Simmerling	255
4	(Switzerland) Fanny Smith	223
5	(Canada) Brittany Phelan	203

== Nations Cup ==
=== Overall ===
Rank	after all 86 races	Points
1	Canada	6738
2	United States	5381
3	France	4360
4	Switzerland	4108
5	Sweden	3442

=== Men's overall ===
Rank	after all 43 races	Points
1	Canada	3438
2	Switzerland	2611
3	United States	2521
4	France	2225
5	Sweden	1800

=== Ladies' overall ===
Rank	after all 43 races	Points
1	Canada	3270
2	United States	2860
3	France	2135
4	Russia	1866
5	Sweden	1642

=== Ski Cross ===
Rank	after all 22 races	Points
1	Canada	1813
2	Switzerland	1807
3	France	1707
4	Sweden	1633
5	Austria	1132

=== Moguls ===
Rank	after all 20 races	Points
1	Canada	2248
2	United States	1798
3	Japan	1278
4	France	1265
5	Kazakhstan	1179

=== Slopestyle ===
Rank	after all 14 races	Points
1	Norway	1186
2	United States	1131
3	Sweden	1098
4	Switzerland	1051
5	Canada	944

=== Halfpipe ===
Rank	after all 12 races	Points
1	United States	1430
2	Canada	955
3	France	681
4	Japan	532
5	China	418

=== Aerials ===
Rank	after all 12 races	Points
1	China	1333
2	Belarus	1212
3	Russia	1103
4	United States	766
5	Australia	648

=== Big Air ===
Rank	after all 6 races	Points
1	Switzerland	605
2	Norway	422
3	Sweden	266
4	Canada	265
5	France	227

=== Cross Alps Tour Overall ===
Rank	after 6 of 12 races	Points
1	Canada	642
2	Sweden	613
3	Switzerland	435
4	France	431
5	Germany	417

=== Men's Cross Alps Tour ===
Rank	after 3 of 6 races	Points
1	Canada	337
2	France	285
3	Sweden	255
4	Switzerland	217
5	Russia	196

=== Ladies' Cross Alps Tour ===
Rank	after 3 of 6 races	Points
1	Sweden	358
2	Germany	318
3	Canada	305
4	Switzerland	218
5	Austria	149
