= FIS Freestyle Ski and Snowboarding World Championships 2019 – Men's ski slopestyle =

Men's ski slopestyle at the FIS Freestyle Ski and Snowboarding World Championships 2019
- Venue: Park City Mountain Resort
- Location: Utah, United States
- Dates: February 6
- Competitors: 47 from 21 nations
- Winning points: 86.68

Medalists
| gold medal | James Woods | Great Britain |
| silver medal | Birk Ruud | Norway |
| bronze medal | Nick Goepper | United States |

The Men's ski slopestyle competition at the FIS Freestyle Ski and Snowboarding World Championships 2019 was held on February 6, 2019. Due to bad weather conditions, the competition was moved back one day.

== Qualification ==
The qualification was started at 11:45. The best five skiers of each heat qualified for the final.

=== Heat 1 ===
| Rank | Bib | Name | Country | Run 1 | Run 2 | Best | Notes |
|---|---|---|---|---|---|---|---|
| 1 | 4 | Nick Goepper | United States | | | 91.25 | Q |
| | 5 | Colin Wili | Switzerland | | | 90.00 | Q |
| | 16 | Birk Ruud | Norway | | | 89.25 | Q |
| 3 | 8 | James Woods | Great Britain | | | 89.00 | Q |
| 4 | 5 | Mac Forehand | United States | | | 86.25 | Q |
| 5 | 25 | Aleksi Patja | Finland | | | 85.00 | Q |
| 6 | 17 | Fabian Bösch | Switzerland | 47.75 | 83.25 | 83.25 | |
| 7 | 51 | Kiernan Fagan | United States | 81.25 | 3.75 | 81.25 | |
| 8 | 37 | Joona Kangas | Finland | 77.25 | 35.50 | 77.25 | |
| 9 | 9 | Philippe Langevin | Canada | 74.25 | 32.50 | 74.25 | |
| 10 | 45 | Dmitrii Makarov | Russia | 72.25 | 23.50 | 72.25 | |
| 11 | 1 | Øystein Bråten | Norway | 51.75 | 66.75 | 66.75 | |
| 12 | 32 | Taisei Yamamoto | Japan | 66.00 | 54.25 | 66.00 | |
| 13 | 49 | Jacob Tapper-Norris | New Zealand | 30.75 | 64.00 | 64.00 | |
| 14 | 29 | Javier Lliso | Spain | 35.75 | 61.25 | 61.25 | |
| 15 | 28 | Lukas Müllauer | Austria | 8.00 | 52.00 | 52.00 | |
| 16 | 21 | Jesper Tjäder | Sweden | 49.50 | 9.25 | 49.50 | |
| 17 | 36 | Chris McCormick | Great Britain | 44.50 | 22.00 | 44.50 | |
| 18 | 33 | Mees van Lierop | Netherlands | 13.75 | 42.75 | 42.75 | |
| 19 | 46 | Vojtěch Břeský | Czech Republic | 40.50 | 16.50 | 40.50 | |
| 20 | 41 | Benjamin Garces | Chile | 31.75 | 36.75 | 36.75 | |
| 21 | 50 | Peter Lengyel | Slovakia | 30.25 | DNS | 30.25 | |
| 22 | 20 | Antoine Adelisse | France | 18.00 | 28.25 | 28.25 | |
| 23 | 42 | Francisco Salas | Chile | 20.25 | 6.50 | 20.25 | |
| | 13 | Evan McEachran | Canada | Did not start | | | |
| | 24 | Alex Beaulieu-Marchand | Canada | Did not start | | | |

=== Heat 2 ===
| Rank | Bib | Name | Country | Run 1 | Run 2 | Best | Notes |
|---|---|---|---|---|---|---|---|
| 1 | 11 | Oscar Wester | Sweden | | | 92.25 | Q |
| 3 | 22 | Jonas Hunziker | Switzerland | | | 87.75 | Q |
| 4 | 7 | Henrik Harlaut | Sweden | | | 86.75 | Q |
| 5 | 23 | McRae Williams | United States | | | 85.25 | Q |
| 6 | 6 | Ferdinand Dahl | Norway | 74.75 | 78.75 | 78.75 | |
| 7 | 34 | Florian Preuß | Germany | 25.00 | 77.50 | 77.50 | |
| 8 | 2 | Oliwer Magnusson | Sweden | 76.00 | 16.75 | 76.00 | |
| 9 | 15 | Finn Bilous | New Zealand | 34.75 | 75.75 | 75.75 | |
| 10 | 18 | Kim Gubser | Switzerland | 71.25 | 75.50 | 75.50 | |
| 11 | 19 | Sebastian Schjerve | Norway | 74.00 | 65.00 | 74.00 | |
| 12 | 30 | Elias Syrjä | Finland | 25.25 | 71.25 | 71.25 | |
| 13 | 47 | Orest Kovalenko | Ukraine | 58.75 | 68.25 | 68.25 | |
| 14 | 26 | Benoît Buratti | France | 23.25 | 63.00 | 63.00 | |
| 15 | 43 | Mateo Bonacalza | Argentina | 15.00 | 52.00 | 52.00 | |
| 16 | 27 | Vincent Maharavo | France | 16.25 | 48.00 | 48.00 | |
| 17 | 40 | Šimon Bartík | Czech Republic | 46.50 | 4.00 | 46.50 | |
| 18 | 3 | Alex Hall | United States | 41.50 | 27.00 | 41.50 | |
| 19 | 48 | Rasmus Dalberg Jørgensen | Denmark | 21.00 | 33.75 | 33.75 | |
| 20 | 35 | Vincent Veile | Germany | 33.50 | 7.75 | 33.50 | |
| 21 | 10 | Teal Harle | Canada | 29.00 | 11.50 | 29.00 | |
| 22 | 31 | Samuel Baumgartner | Austria | 27.25 | 28.00 | 28.00 | |
| 23 | 44 | Nahuel Medrano | Argentina | 20.75 | 22.50 | 22.50 | |
| 24 | 39 | Eetu Rintamaa | Finland | 7.25 | 18.75 | 18.75 | |

== Final ==
The final was started at 14:45.

| Rank | Bib | Name | Country | Run 1 | Run 2 | Run 3 | Best |
|---|---|---|---|---|---|---|---|
| 1st place, gold medalist(s) | 8 | James Woods | Great Britain | 56.51 | 86.68 | 22.48 | 86.68 |
| 2nd place, silver medalist(s) | 16 | Birk Ruud | Norway | 47.76 | 85.40 | 9.91 | 85.40 |
| 3rd place, bronze medalist(s) | 4 | Nick Goepper | United States | 84.46 | 34.78 | 85.18 | 85.18 |
| 4 | 5 | Mac Forehand | United States | 70.30 | 83.30 | 24.40 | 83.30 |
| 5 | 7 | Henrik Harlaut | Sweden | 13.51 | 82.70 | 36.65 | 82.70 |
| 6 | 12 | Colin Wili | Switzerland | 23.93 | 79.06 | 81.81 | 81.81 |
| 7 | 23 | McRae Williams | United States | 76.28 | 33.45 | 42.91 | 76.28 |
| 8 | 22 | Jonas Hunziker | Switzerland | 25.68 | 73.43 | 27.26 | 73.43 |
| 9 | 25 | Aleksi Patja | Finland | 29.65 | 44.55 | 33.16 | 44.55 |
| 10 | 11 | Oscar Wester | Sweden | 33.11 | 30.25 | 2.36 | 33.11 |
