= Freestyle skiing at the 2014 Winter Olympics – Men's slopestyle =

Men's slopestyle at the XXII Olympic Winter Games
- Venue: Rosa Khutor Extreme Park, Krasnaya Polyana, Russia
- Dates: 13 February 2014
- Competitors: 32 from 15 nations
- Winning score: 95.80

Medalists
1st place, gold medalist(s)		Joss Christensen	United States
2nd place, silver medalist(s)		Gus Kenworthy	United States
3rd place, bronze medalist(s)		Nick Goepper	United States

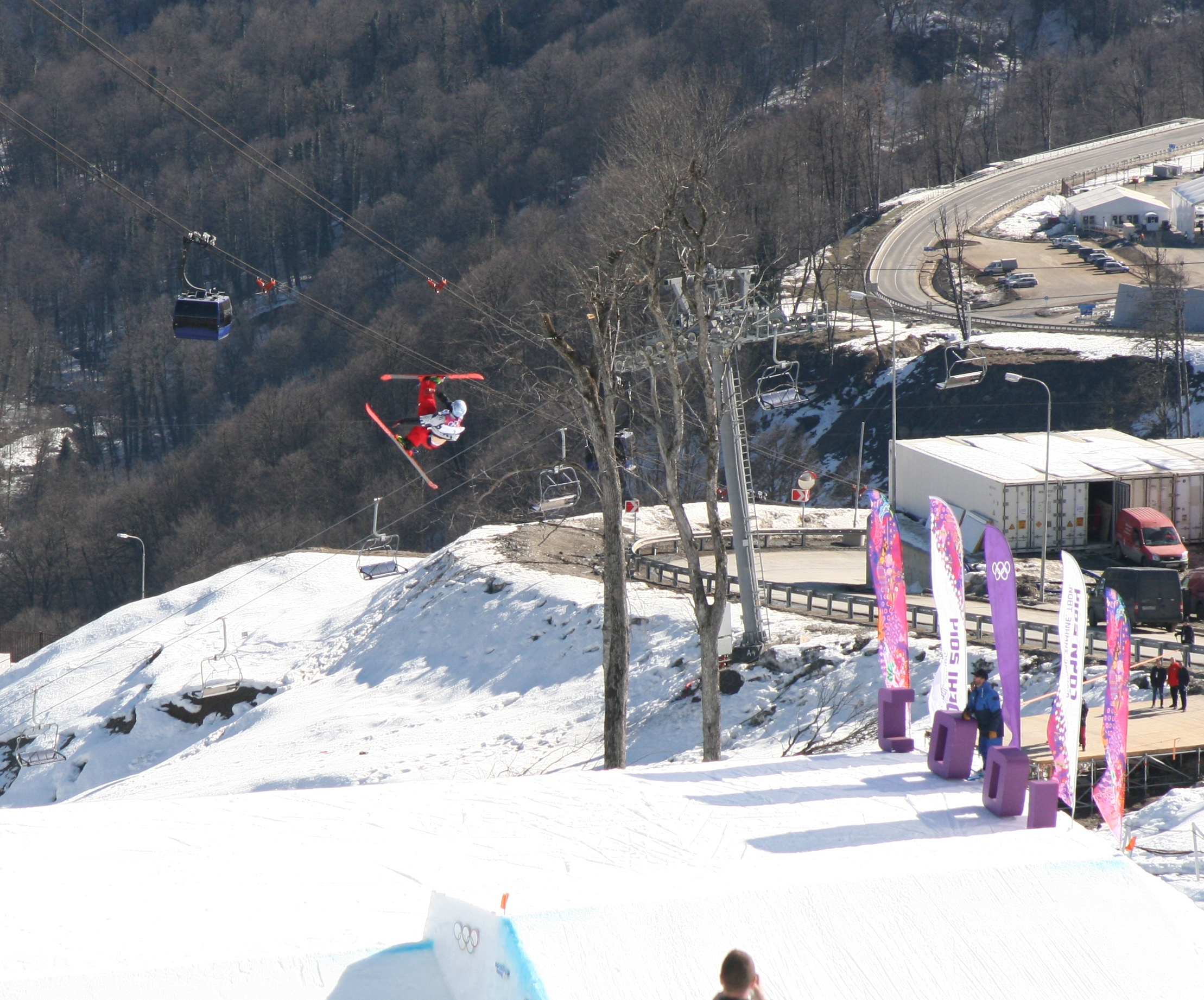
Men's slopestyle at the Rosa Khutor Extreme Park. Winter Olympics 2014.

The men's slopestyle event in freestyle skiing at the 2014 Winter Olympics in Sochi, Russia took place on 13 February 2014. In July 2011 freestyle slopestyle was added to the Olympic program, meaning the event would make its debut.

== Qualification ==
An athlete must have placed in the top 30 at a World Cup event after July 2012 or at the 2013 World Championships and a minimum of 50 FIS points. A total of 30 quota spots were available to athletes to compete at the games. A maximum of 4 athletes could be entered by a National Olympic Committee.

However a total of 32 athletes are entered, meaning reallocations of quotas were done by the International Ski Federation.

== Results ==
=== Qualification ===
The qualification was held at 10:15.

Rank	Bib	Name	Country	Run 1	Run 2	Best	Notes
1	34	Joss Christensen	United States	91.0	93.2	93.2	Q
2	9	Andreas Håtveit	Norway	88.0	87.4	88.0	Q
3	7	James Woods	Great Britain	87.2	40.0	87.2	Q
4	1	Nick Goepper	United States	14.8	87.0	87.0	Q
5	8	Gus Kenworthy	United States	86.4	85.8	86.4	Q
6	14	Alex Beaulieu-Marchand	Canada	20.0	85.6	85.6	Q
7	5	Russ Henshaw	Australia	84.6	83.4	84.6	Q
8	30	Øystein Bråten	Norway	79.2	84.2	84.2	Q
9	15	Aleksander Aurdal	Norway	67.0	83.8	83.8	Q
10	4	Josiah Wells	New Zealand	82.8	83.4	83.4	Q
11	25	Henrik Harlaut	Sweden	29.2	83.2	83.2	Q
12	3	Bobby Brown	United States	3.4	83.0	83.0	Q
13	17	Antti Ollila	Finland	81.4	31.6	81.4	
14	26	Luca Tribondeau	Austria	80.2	80.8	80.8	
15	31	Markus Eder	Italy	11.8	79.0	79.0	
16	11	Kai Mahler	Switzerland	76.2	29.0	76.2	
17	28	Per Kristian Hunder	Norway	15.6	75.4	75.4	
18	16	Oscar Wester	Sweden	72.8	28.8	72.8	
19	27	Jérémy Pancras	France	68.0	69.4	69.4	
20	36	Benedikt Mayr	Germany	67.6	7.2	67.6	
21	35	Beau-James Wells	New Zealand	36.0	66.6	66.6	
22	13	Elias Ambühl	Switzerland	58.0	65.8	65.8	
23	10	Fabian Bösch	Switzerland	11.8	63.0	63.0	
24	2	Jesper Tjäder	Sweden	61.0	14.2	61.0	
25	32	Otso Räisänen	Finland	59.6	56.2	59.6	
26	39	Marek Skála	Czech Republic	51.6	54.6	54.6	
27	29	Antoine Adelisse	France	54.2	50.4	54.2	
28	40	Pavel Korpachev	Russia	46.4	43.6	46.4	
29	37	Lauri Kivari	Finland	45.8	2.8	45.8	
30	38	Jules Bonnaire	France	2.2	40.0	40.0	
31	33	Aleksi Patja	Finland	10.8	12.0	12.0	
32	20	Luca Schuler	Switzerland	6.8	5.2	6.8	

=== Final ===
The final was held at 13:30.

Rank	Bib	Name	Country	Run 1	Run 2	Best
1st place, gold medalist(s)	34	Joss Christensen	United States	95.80	93.80	95.80
2nd place, silver medalist(s)	8	Gus Kenworthy	United States	31.00	93.60	93.60
3rd place, bronze medalist(s)	1	Nick Goepper	United States	92.40	61.80	92.40
4	9	Andreas Håtveit	Norway	89.60	91.80	91.80
5	7	James Woods	Great Britain	86.60	78.40	86.60
6	25	Henrik Harlaut	Sweden	83.80	84.40	84.40
7	15	Aleksander Aurdal	Norway	70.00	81.80	81.80
8	5	Russ Henshaw	Australia	80.40	28.80	80.40
9	3	Bobby Brown	United States	29.20	78.40	78.40
10	30	Øystein Bråten	Norway	66.40	65.80	66.40
11	4	Josiah Wells	New Zealand	60.60	50.00	60.60
12	14	Alex Beaulieu-Marchand	Canada	5.00	21.40	21.40
