= 2009–2010 Winter Dew Tour =

The 2009–2010 Winter Dew Tour was the second year for the event.

== Stop 1: Breckenridge Ski Resort ==
The first stop took place at Breckenridge Ski Resort in Breckenridge, Colorado between December 18 and 20, 2009.

=== Freeskiing ===
Event	Gold		Silver		Bronze	
Men's Superpipe	Mike Riddle (CAN)	93.00	Josiah Wells (NZL)	91.50	Xavier Bertoni (FRA)	90.75
Men's Slopestyle	Andreas Håtveit (NOR)	93.00	Tom Wallisch (USA)	92.38	Sammy Carlson (USA)	91.13

=== Snowboarding ===
Event	Gold		Silver		Bronze	
Men's Superpipe	Danny Davis (USA)	96.50	Yuri Podladchikov (RUS)	91.25	J.J. Thomas (USA)	84.75
Women's Superpipe	Queralt Castellet (ESP)	92.50	Sarah Conrad (CAN)	89.00	Kjersti Østgaard Buaas (NOR)	87.00
Men's Slopestyle	Tyler Flanagan (USA)	93.00	Sage Kotsenburg (USA)	90.00	Eric Willett (USA)	87.50
Women's Slopestyle	Jamie Anderson (USA)	92.00	Šárka Pančochová (CZE)	80.25	Jenny Jones (GBR)	67.50

== Stop 2: Snowbasin Resort ==
The second stop on the tour took place at Snowbasin Resort in Huntsville, Utah between January 15 and 17, 2010.

=== Freeskiing ===
Event	Gold		Silver		Bronze	
Men's Superpipe	Josiah Wells (NZL)	92.50	Simon Dumont (USA)	91.38	Peter Olenick (USA)	89.50
Women's Superpipe	Sarah Burke (USA)	91.75	Jen Hudak (USA)	88.75	Rosalind Groenewoud (CAN)	83.00
Men's Slopestyle	Bobby Brown (USA)	93.25	Sammy Carlson (USA)	91.25	Andreas Håtveit (NOR)	89.00

=== Snowboarding ===
Event	Gold		Silver		Bronze	
Men's Superpipe	Danny Davis (USA)	96.00	Steve Fisher (USA)	91.75	Jack Mitrani (USA)	84.75
Women's Superpipe	Elena Hight (USA)	92.50	Kaitlyn Farrington (USA)	88.25	Queralt Castellet (ESP)	81.25
Men's Slopestyle	Charles Guldemond (USA)	95.25	Tyler Flanagan (USA)	93.75	Sage Kotsenburg (USA)	92.40
Women's Slopestyle	Spencer O'Brien (CAN)	91.00	Jenny Jones (UK)	86.75	Megan Ginter (USA)	80.00

== Stop 3: Mount Snow Resort ==
West Dover, Vermont's Mount Snow shifted to the third stop from last year's second and took place between February 5 and 7, 2010.

=== Freeskiing ===
Event	Gold		Silver		Bronze	
Men's Superpipe	Simon Dumont (USA)	94.75	Tucker Perkins (USA)	92.00	Justin Dorey (CAN)	90.00
Men's Slopestyle	Bobby Brown (USA)	91.75	Andreas Håtveit (NOR)	89.00	Sammy Carlson (USA)	86.75

=== Snowboarding ===
Event	Gold		Silver		Bronze	
Men's Superpipe	J.J. Thomas (USA)	96.75	Brennan Swanson (USA)	91.00	Steve Fisher (CAN)	85.00
Women's Superpipe	Kaitlyn Farrington (USA)	90.75	Madeline Schaffrick (USA)	85.00	Kjersti Buass (NOR)	72.50
Men's Slopestyle	Torstein Horgmo (NOR)	96.50	Sage Kotsenburg (USA)	90.25	Ian Thorley (USA)	86.75
Women's Slopestyle	Jamie Anderson (USA)		Jenny Jones (GBR)		Spencer O'Brien (CAN)	

== Results ==
The AST Winter Dew Tour ended with the Toyota Championship at Northstar-at-Tahoe event. Here are the final results from the 2008/2009 tour.

=== Freeskiing ===
Event	Gold		Silver		Bronze	
Men's Superpipe	Jossi Wells (NZL)	190	Simon Dumont (USA)	155	Xavier Bertoni (FRA)	150
Men's Slopestyle	Andreas Håtveit (NOR)	280	Bobby Brown (USA)	255	Tom Wallisch (USA)	250

=== Snowboarding ===
Event	Gold		Silver		Bronze	
Men's Superpipe	J.J. Thomas (USA)	245	Steve Fisher (CAN)	240	Danny Davis (USA)	200
Women's Superpipe	Kaitlyn Farrington (USA)	255	Kelly Marren (USA)	225	Kjersti Buaas (NOR)	220
Men's Slopestyle	Sage Kotsenburg (USA)	260	Torstein Horgmo (NOR)	240	Tyler Flanagan (USA)	235
Women's Slopestyle	Jamie Anderson (USA)	275	Jenny Jones (UK)	260	Spencer O'Brien (CAN)	255
