= Jennie-Lee Burmansson =

Swedish freestyle skier (born 2002)

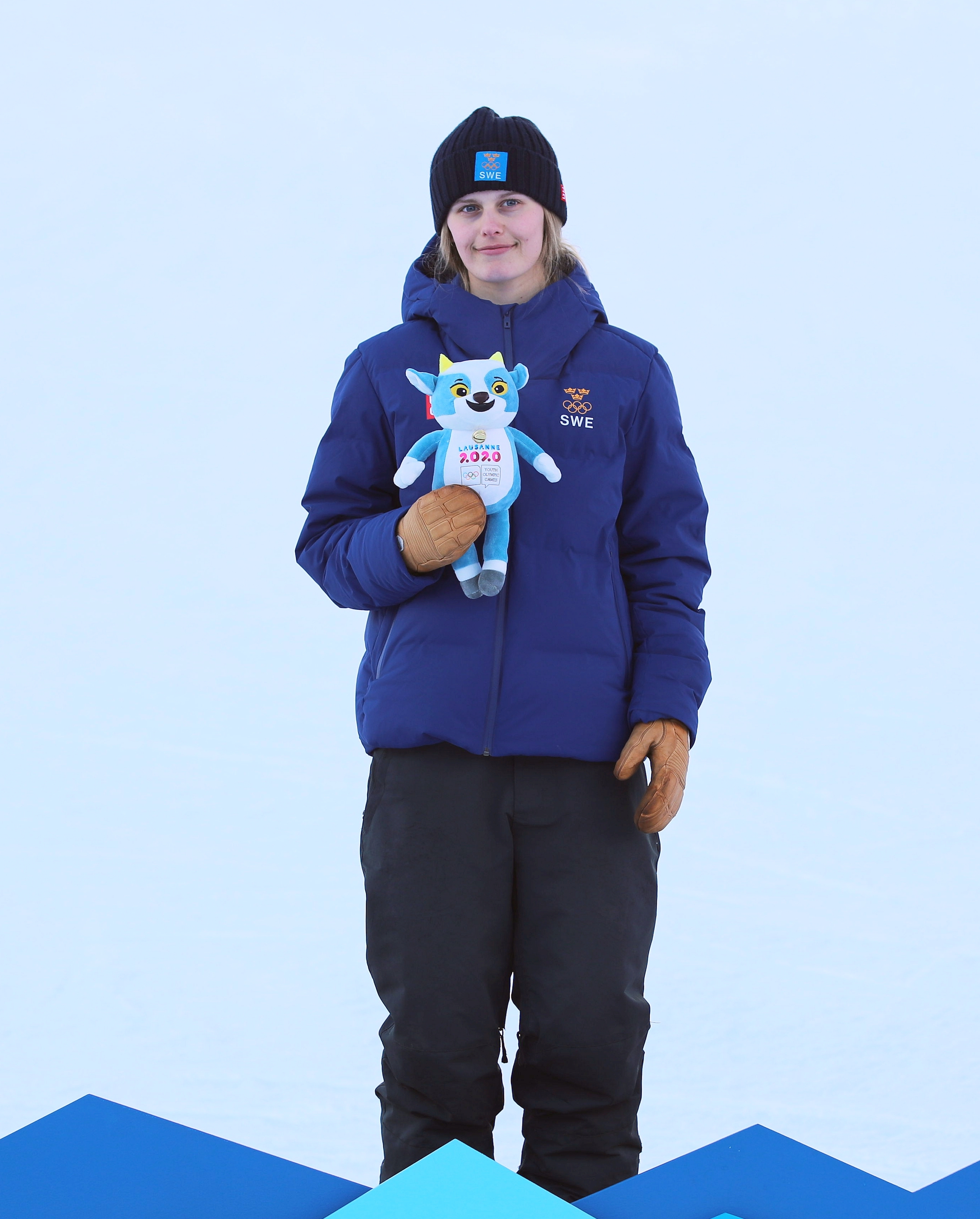

Personal information
- Born: 12 July 2002 (age 24)

Sport
- Sport: Skiing

World Cup career
- Indiv. podiums: 5
- Indiv. wins: 1
- Discipline titles: 1 (1 SS)
Medal record
Women's freestyle skiing
Representing Sweden
Winter X Games
Bronze medal – third place	2018 Aspen	Slopestyle
Winter X Games Europe
Gold medal – first place	2018 Oslo	Big air
Winter Youth Olympics
Bronze medal – third place	2020 Lausanne	Big air
Bronze medal – third place	2020 Lausanne	Slopestyle

Jennie-Lee Burmansson (born 12 July 2002) is a Swedish freestyle skier. She won a bronze medal in slopestyle at Winter X Games XXII. In 2018, Burmansson won the slopestyle World Cup and finished third in the overall World Cup standings.

== World Cup results ==
=== Season titles ===
1 title (1 SS)

Season
Season	Discipline
2018	Slopestyle

=== Season standings ===
Season
Season	Age	Overall	Slopestyle	Big air
2018	15	3rd place, bronze medalist(s)	1st place, gold medalist(s)	—
2019	16	knee injury in September: out for season		
2020	17	96	18	—

=== Podiums ===
- 1 win – (1 SS)
- 5 podiums – (5 SS)

Season
Season	Date	Location	Discipline	Place
2018; 1 victory (1 SS)	27 August 2017	Cardrona, New Zealand	Slopestyle	3rd
2018; 1 victory (1 SS)	26 November 2017	Stubai, Austria	Slopestyle	1st
2018; 1 victory (1 SS)	23 December 2017	Font Romeu, France	Slopestyle	2nd
2018; 1 victory (1 SS)	21 January 2018	Mammoth Mountain, United States	Slopestyle	2nd
2018; 1 victory (1 SS)	3 March 2018	Silvaplana, Switzerland	Slopestyle	3rd

== World Championship results ==
Year
Year	Age	Slopestyle	Big air
2019	16	injured: did not compete	

== Olympic results ==
Year
Year	Age	Slopestyle	Big air
2018	15	8	N/A
