= Freestyle skiing at the 2018 Winter Olympics – Men's slopestyle =

Men's slopestyle at the XXIII Olympic Winter Games
- Venue: Bogwang Phoenix Park, Pyeongchang, South Korea
- Dates: 18 February
- Competitors: 30 from 12 nations
- Winning score: 95.00

Medalists
1st place, gold medalist(s)		Øystein Bråten	Norway
2nd place, silver medalist(s)		Nick Goepper	United States
3rd place, bronze medalist(s)		Alex Beaulieu-Marchand	Canada

The men's slopestyle event in freestyle skiing at the 2018 Winter Olympics took place on 18 February 2018 at the Bogwang Phoenix Park, Pyeongchang, South Korea.

== Qualification ==
The top 30 athletes in the Olympic quota allocation list qualified, with a maximum of four athletes per National Olympic Committee (NOC) allowed. All athletes qualifying must also have placed in the top 30 of a FIS World Cup event or the FIS Freestyle Ski and Snowboarding World Championships 2017 during the qualification period (1 July 2016 to 21 January 2018) and also have a minimum of 50 FIS points to compete. If the host country, South Korea at the 2018 Winter Olympics did not qualify, their chosen athlete would displace the last qualified athlete, granted all qualification criterion was met.

== Results ==
=== Qualification ===
Q — Qualified for the Final

The top 12 athletes in the qualifiers moved on to the medal round.

Rank	Bib	Name	Country	Run 1	Run 2	Best	Notes
1	3	Oscar Wester	Sweden	40.60	95.40	95.40	Q
2	1	Andri Ragettli	Switzerland	95.00	27.40	95.00	Q
3	28	Alex Beaulieu-Marchand	Canada	48.20	94.20	94.20	Q
4	2	Øystein Bråten	Norway	83.20	93.80	93.80	Q
5	12	Nick Goepper	United States	92.80	85.00	92.80	Q
6	7	Teal Harle	Canada	88.00	91.20	91.20	Q
7	30	Gus Kenworthy	United States	88.60	90.80	90.80	Q
8	6	James Woods	Great Britain	90.20	19.60	90.20	Q
9	18	Elias Ambühl	Switzerland	89.60	67.40	89.60	Q
10	4	Ferdinand Dahl	Norway	46.60	89.00	89.00	Q
11	5	Evan McEachran	Canada	74.80	87.80	87.80	Q
12	11	Jonas Hunziker	Switzerland	85.80	64.80	85.80	Q
13	19	Finn Bilous	New Zealand	24.80	85.00	85.00	
14	14	Felix Stridsberg-Usterud	Norway	14.60	84.20	84.20	
15	9	McRae Williams	United States	81.60	26.40	81.60	
16	16	Alex Hall	United States	69.80	77.80	77.80	
17	13	Henrik Harlaut	Sweden	18.00	75.80	75.80	
18	22	Oliwer Magnusson	Sweden	73.20	69.20	73.20	
19	27	Russ Henshaw	Australia	72.60	64.00	72.60	
20	21	Taisei Yamamoto	Japan	56.00	70.40	70.40	
21	24	Benoit Buratti	France	67.00	62.00	67.00	
22	15	Alex Bellemare	Canada	64.20	26.20	64.20	
23	8	Jesper Tjäder	Sweden	60.60	56.00	60.60	
24	10	Fabian Bösch	Switzerland	8.20	55.00	55.00	
25	20	Jackson Wells	New Zealand	52.80	42.00	52.80	
26	26	Joona Kangas	Finland	47.80	48.80	48.80	
27	25	Robert Franco	Mexico	21.60	36.00	36.00	
28	29	Christian Nummedal	Norway	27.00	29.20	29.20	
29	23	Tyler Harding	Great Britain	20.00	21.00	21.00	
30	17	Antoine Adelisse	France	10.00	17.60	17.60	

=== Final ===
The final was started at 14:11.

Rank	Bib	Name	Country	Run 1	Run 2	Run 3	Best	Notes
1st place, gold medalist(s)	2	Øystein Bråten	Norway	95.00	46.40	24.00	95.00	
2nd place, silver medalist(s)	12	Nick Goepper	United States	59.00	69.00	93.60	93.60	
3rd place, bronze medalist(s)	28	Alex Beaulieu-Marchand	Canada	81.60	92.40	82.40	92.40	
4	6	James Woods	Great Britain	29.20	91.00	90.00	91.00	
5	7	Teal Harle	Canada	22.80	25.60	90.00	90.00	
6	5	Evan McEachran	Canada	89.40	4.40	32.60	89.40	
7	1	Andri Ragettli	Switzerland	85.80	73.20	65.40	85.80	
8	4	Ferdinand Dahl	Norway	42.20	76.40	41.80	76.40	
9	18	Elias Ambühl	Switzerland	18.80	71.60	73.20	73.20	
10	11	Jonas Hunziker	Switzerland	5.20	66.20	46.40	66.20	
11	3	Oscar Wester	Sweden	7.60	62.00	12.60	62.00	
12	30	Gus Kenworthy	United States	35.00	20.00	32.00	35.00	
