= Coming Out Colton =

American television series

- Genre: Reality
- Starring: Colton Underwood
- No. of seasons: 1
- No. of episodes: 6

Production
- Executive producers: Jeff Jenkins; Reinout Oerlemans; Ross Weintraub; Omid Kahangi; Colton Underwood; Kate Fisher; Dan Cerny

Original release
- Network: Netflix
- Release: December 3, 2021

Coming Out Colton is an American reality television series created by Jeff Jenkins that follows Colton Underwood as he comes out of the closet. The unscripted series of six episodes premiered December 3, 2021, on Netflix. Underwood, a former professional football player, starred in the 23rd season of The Bachelor in 2019, before publicly coming out as gay in April 2021.

== Premise ==
Coming Out Colton chronicles Underwood's coming-out process and his exploration of the LGBTQ+ community. Olympian skier Gus Kenworthy, who came out in 2015, appears in several episodes. The series also features Underwood meeting openly gay ex-NFL players David Kopay, Esera Tuaolo, and Michael Sam.

== Synopsis ==
Colton Underwood, a former professional athlete, and reality TV star, competed on The Bachelorette and was later nicknamed by fans as the "virgin bachelor," dating 30 women on a Bachelor season of his own. In April 2021, Underwood came out of the closet on American network Good Morning America and in the following months released an exclusive Netflix docu-series on his journey going from a closeted, self-loathing 29-year-old to accepting himself as a gay man exploring the LGBTQ community. This television documentary also trails his career as an NFL player and his appearance as the bachelor in the 23rd season of the American TV reality series The Bachelor.

Underwood emotionally said he chose to come out of the closet the day he heard of a restraining order against him, which was issued on September 14, 2020, just after a suspected overdose. They announced their breakup on May 29, 2020. Underwood came out as gay on April 14, 2021.

Throughout the six-episode series, Underwood begins connecting with other prominent LGBTQ folks and LQBTQ athletes, exploring what made him feel like he needed to stay in the closet. The show provides a more intimate look at his coming-out process, before his Good Morning America interview, as he comes out to family members and brings the cameras with him as he prepares to share his truth with the world.

== Interviews ==
This is the list of the 33 persons interviewed for the documentary, ordered by airtime.

- Colton Underwood
- Donna Underwood
- Gus Kenworthy
- Kassidy Foster
- Connor Underwood
- Scott Underwood
- Shelby Harris
- Reese, Chase, and Ty (Colton’s Stepbrothers)
- David Kopay
- Esera Tuaolo
- Michael Sam
- Darrell Crouch
- Cody Alan and Trea
- Jaidynn Diore Feirce
- Russell and Miles
- Cody Belew
- Kevin (Friend from church)
- Ben Mann
- Manuel
- George
- Heather
- Kurt Kelly
- Nicole Garcia
- Joseph and Eddie
- Peter Marc Jacobson
- Fran Drescher
- Onyeka Ehie

== Episodes ==
No.	Title	Directed by	Original release date
1	"Family"	Josh Barnett	December 3, 2021
Reality TV star Colton Underwood ("The Bachelor") begins a new chapter, as he opens up to his mother and plans for more conversations; Olympic athlete Gus Kenworthy offers advice.
2	"Football"	Josh Barnett	December 3, 2021
As Colton prepares to speak to his high school coach, former NFL players Michael Sam, David Kopay and Esera Tuaolo share their stories as gay athletes.
3	"Friends"	Josh Barnett	December 3, 2021
In Nashville, Tenn., Colton bonds with country radio host Cody Alan, but the pressure of mixing and mingling at a party gives him pause.
4	"Church"	Josh Barnett	December 3, 2021
Colton reflects on his relationship with God, shares his truth with faith-based friends and connects with members of the Metropolitan Community Church.
5	"The Public"	Josh Barnett	December 3, 2021
After a series of private conversations, Colton decides to publicly come out on television; in New York City, he visits the historic Stonewall Inn with his father and Gus.
6	"The Past & The Future"	Josh Barnett	December 3, 2021
A wave of backlash serves as a painful reminder of Colton's past choices; in response, he turns to friends and mentors to pave the way toward healing.

== Production and release ==
The series was filmed in late 2020 and early 2021, all in preparation for the Good Morning America interview on April 14, 2021. The program required a substantial amount of traveling and the organization of several meetings and large events for Underwood to participate. Whilst a good amount of the series is filmed in Underwood’s hometown, Denver, he also goes back to his early life hometown of Washington, Illinois, to meet with his old high school football coach and teammates. He also travels to Nashville, Tennessee, to make familiarities with other members of the LGBTQ community. Finally, he travels to New York City to take part in his Good Morning America interview. The series closes just a few days after his Good Morning America appearance meaning the series took around five months to shoot in total.

On Nov. 23 2021, in promotional efforts for the docuseries, Underwood shared a special meaning behind the promo photo released on the same day. "This image was captured moments after I came out to my dad, which was one of the most meaningful parts of my coming out journey," he said. "I'm looking forward to sharing more of my story with you including the lessons I've been learning along the way. Coming Out Colton premieres on Netflix December 3rd."

Lifestyle and entertainment programming network, LogoTV, who target LGBTQ audiences and reach millions of subscribed households, also posted on social media a series insight to promote the release of the series, captioning their post “@coltonunderwood views his privilege as “an opportunity for me to help out other people who might not have that privilege, to learn from them, to amplify their voices, to share their stories.” #TheBachelor alum chats with #LogoLive’s @JohnnySibilly on his publicised coming-out journey and subsequent @Netflix show #ComingOutColton, his evolving relationship with God as an openly #gay #Christian, and what he has learned about his privilege through the critiques he's received.”

== Reception ==
=== Critical response ===
Response from the series was heavily varied, both largely criticized by several top critics, and also rated favorably by the general audience. A representative from one magazine suggested “my discomfort with the show, rather, is how he has used this journey for personal gain, quick wealth, and celebrity,” before further criticizing Underwood by drawing the analogy “fuck selling Tummy Tea on Instagram when you have a whole marginalized community to profit off of, right?”

Standing in solidarity with these claims, critics from Variety magazine said, “new Netflix reality series “Coming Out Colton,” announced after its star’s seemingly open interview with Robin Roberts, suggests that there is little that Underwood won't leverage to rebuild his public image and seek new opportunities,” before concluding that “‘Coming Out Colton’ is a distasteful extension of a brand that doesn't mean much to begin with.”

Underwood also received copious backlash through critics that claimed the story of his coming out was merely a matter of “anything to be famous,” as Entertainment Weekly put it, as the idea that Underwood comes out the same week that it is announced he has a reality show deal in place with Netflix. Other major critiques of Underwood included the notion that it was purely a ploy for Underwood to gain sympathy and restore his reputation following the restraining order filed against him by his ex-girlfriend, Cassie Randolph.

Some critics opposed these views, suggesting that the series’ impact on the LGBTQ community is constructive and well worth production, with one representative from Decider, and top critic on Rotten Tomatoes, saying that “despite the sloppiness by the show’s producers, and some of its repetitiveness, we still appreciate Underwood’s coming out journey enough to make Coming Out Colton a worthwhile watch.”

Reacting to his critics, Colton Underwood addressed backlash to his series, as he featured on Alex Cooper’s podcast when he said, “I see the criticism, I know that people are upset that I have white privilege and I got a series after coming out.”

On review aggregator Rotten Tomatoes, the series holds an approval rating of 67% based on 28 reviews, with an average rating of 6.10/10.

=== Response from athletic researchers ===
The docuseries draws references from a few studies that explore homosexuality within athletic communities. Specifically, a 2011 study by Adi Adams and Eric Anderson which concludes that despite decreasing homophobia, openly gay male athletes are still rare in organized, competitive team sports. In their action research, two aspects of homosexuality and sport are explored. The first being the effect of a gay male soccer player coming out to his teammates, and the second being the effect of having an openly gay researcher in the field, and the study was the first-ever first-hand account of an athlete's coming-out process with researchers in the field.

Likewise, a study conducted by School of Journalism at the University of Kansas explored the attitudes and beliefs on homosexuality in sport reflected the writing of journalists reporting on the coming-out stories of the first openly gay athletes across a variety of sports. The results concluded that the National Football League is more resistant to the presences of gay male teammates, with more attitudes aligned with a traditional hegemonic masculinity. The series, although not delving too deep into discrimination, coincides with this study as they determine that there are still obstacles to achieving LGBTQ equality in professional sports leagues.
