= Jesper Tjäder =

Swedish freestyle skier (born 1994)

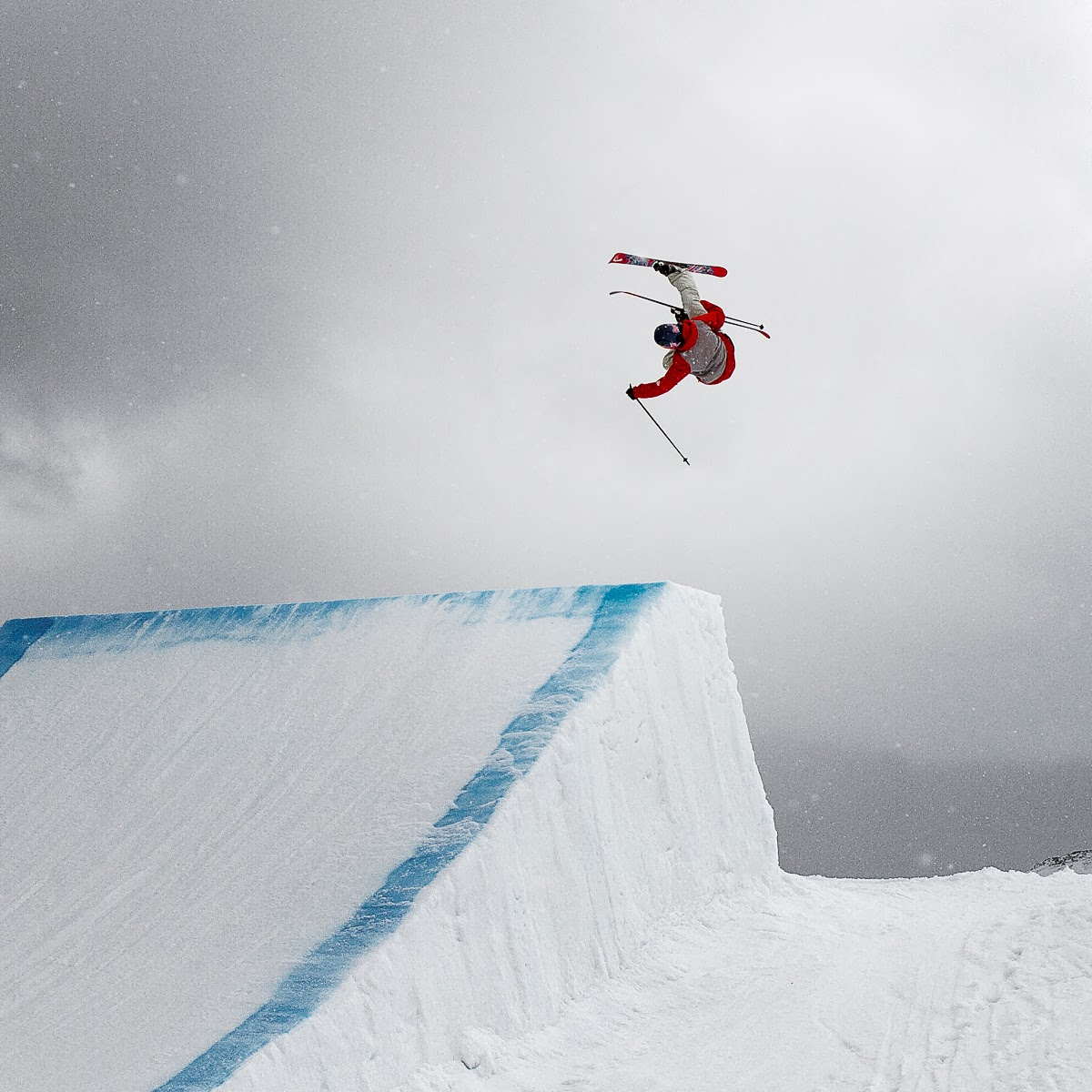
- Tjäder in 2013

Personal information
- Born: 22 May 1994 (age 32) Östersund, Sweden

Sport
- Country: Sweden
- Sport: Freestyle skiing
- Event: Slopestyle
Medal record
Men's freestyle skiing
Representing Sweden
Olympic Games
Bronze medal – third place	2022 Beijing	Slopestyle
Winter X Games
Gold medal – first place	2023 Aspen	Knuckle Huck

Jesper Tjäder (born 22 May 1994) is a Swedish freestyle skier. He won the overall slopestyle World Cup in 2014, and competed for Sweden at the 2014, 2018, 2022, and 2026 winter olympics; winning a Bronze medal in slopestyle in 2022.

== Personal life ==
Tjäder was born in Östersund, Sweden, on 22 May 1994. His parents introduced him to skiing at the age of three.

== Career ==
Tjäder competed in slopestyle at the FIS Freestyle World Ski Championships 2013, and he represented Sweden in slopestyle at the 2014 Winter Olympics in Sochi, where he finished 24th. At the 2013–14 FIS Freestyle Skiing World Cup, Tjäder won the overall slopestyle cup and placed third overall. Tjäder returned to the Winter Olympics for 2018 in PyeongChang, where he placed 23rd in the slopestyle competition. Tjäder again returned to the Winter Olympics for 2022 in Beijing, where he placed 3rd and secured a bronze medal in the slopestyle competition.

Tjäder progressed freeskiing by innovating tricks and building never-seen-before rails.

In Xgames 2024 Aspen, Jesper contended in the Knuckle huck and won a bronze after Henrik Harlaut.
