= Noah Wallace =

American freestyle skier (born 1991)

Medal record

Men's freestyle skiing

Representing United States

World Championships
| Bronze medal – third place | 2015 Kreischberg | Slopestyle |

Noah Wallace (born July 6, 1991) is an American freestyle skier. He won a bronze medal in Slopestyle at the FIS Freestyle Ski and Snowboarding World Championships 2015.
