= Per Kristian Hunder =

Norwegian freestyle skier

Personal information
- Nationality: Norwegian
- Born: 28 April 1989 (age 36) Lillehammer, Norway

Sport
- Country: Norway
- Sport: Freestyle skiing

Per Kristian Hunder (born 28 April 1989) is a Norwegian freestyle skier. He was born in Lillehammer. He competed at the 2014 Winter Olympics in Sochi, in slopestyle (17th place). He won a 3rd place at Winter X Games 2009 Big Air. His best results in World Cup is a 3rd place at the Slopestyle event at Jyväskylä.
