= Jacob Wester =

Swedish freestyle skier (born 1987)

- Wester at the Winter X Games

Personal information
- Born: 17 November 1987 (age 38)
- Occupation: Skier

Sport
- Country: Sweden
Medal record
Men's freestyle skiing
Representing Sweden
Winter X Games
Bronze medal – third place	2009 Aspen	Big Air

Jacob Wester (born 17 November 1987 in Stockholm, Sweden) is a Swedish freeskier.

== Skiing ==
Jacob began Skiing at the age of five, but only appeared onto the freeskiing scene in 2005 when he finished second place at the Jon Olsson Invitational, later that year he won the "Air We Go" in Oslo, Norway. Jacob has been mentored by pro freeskier and fellow countryman Jon Olsson, with both him and Jon pushing the "doubles movement", doing tricks like double flips and double corks.

== Personal life ==
Jacob moved out of his parents house, in late 2008, and into an apartment just outside Stockholm, he lives with his girlfriend Sofia Sjöberg. When he's not skiing, Jacob goes surfing for at least 75 days of the year. Since being taught by Jon Olsson in June off 2006 while in Brazil he has surfed in Bali, Africa and Orange County, California. Jacob also ice skates and fishes on the lake near his apartment. Although he admits he has never been never a great artist, Jacob has recently started to practice tattooing, using a kit Sofia brought him for his birthday, he practices on fruits, fake skin, and his legs in the hope he can do it professionally once his skiing career is over. His brother, Oscar Wester, also represents Sweden in skiing.

== Results ==
- 2009 3rd Sweet Rumble Big Air, Trysil, Norway
- 2009 3rd Winter X Games XIII, Big Air, Aspen, Colorado
- 2008 1st Freestyle.ch, Big Air, Zürich, Switzerland
- 2008 1st Icer Air, Big Air, San Francisco
- 2008 1st North American Open, Slopestyle, Breckenridge, Colorado
- 2008 4th London Freeze Big Air, London
- 2008 4th King Of Style, Big Air Stockholm Sweden
- 2007 10th King Of Style, Big Air, Stockholm, Sweden
- 2007 2nd Jon Olsson Invitational, Big Air Åre, Sweden
- 2007 2nd US Open, Big Air, Cooper, Colorado
- 2006 8th Freestyle.ch, Big Air, Zürich, Switzerland
- 2006 13th World Skiing Invitational, Superpipe, Whistler, BC, Canada
- 2006 6th Orage European Freeskiing Open, Superpipe, Laax, Switzerland
- 2006 5th Orage European Freeskiing Open, Slopestyle, Laax, Switzerland
- 2005 1st Air We Go, Big Air, Oslo, Norway
- 2005 4th N.Z. Free Ski Open, Slopestyle, Wānaka, New Zealand
- 2005 2nd Jon Olsson Invitational, Big Air, Åre, Sweden
- 2005 4th US Open, Big Air, Vail, Colorado
