= Jérémy Pancras =

French freestyle skier

Personal information
- Nationality: French
- Born: 26 December 1991 (age 34) Annecy

Sport
- Country: France
- Sport: Freestyle skiing

Jérémy Pancras (born 26 December 1991) is a French freestyle skier. He was born in Annecy. He competed at the 2014 Winter Olympics in Sochi, in slopestyle.
