= Jarret Thomas =

American snowboarder (born 1981)

J J Thomas
Personal information
- Born: April 6, 1981 (age 45) Golden, Colorado, U.S.
- Height: 5 ft 4 in (163 cm)
- Weight: 158 lb (72 kg)

Sport
- Country: United States
- Sport: Snowboarding
Medal record
Men's snowboarding
Representing the United States
Olympic Games
| Bronze medal – third place | 2002 Salt Lake City | Halfpipe |

Jarret John "JJ" Thomas (born April 6, 1981) is an American snowboard coach and former professional competitor for the US half pipe team.

At the 2002 Winter Olympics in Salt Lake City, he won bronze in the halfpipe event.
