= Antoine Adelisse =

French freestyle skier (born 1996)

Personal information
- Born: 10 June 1996 (age 30) Nantes, Loire-Atlantique, France

Sport
- Country: France
- Sport: Freestyle skiing
Medal record
Men's freestyle skiing
Representing France
Winter X Games
Silver medal – second place	2021 Aspen	Big air

Antoine Adelisse (born 10 June 1996) is a French freestyle skier. He was born in Nantes. He competed in slopestyle at the FIS Freestyle World Ski Championships 2013. He represented France at the 2014 Winter Olympics in Sochi, the 2018 Winter Olympics in PyeongChang, and the 2022 Winter Olympics in Beijing.
