= Otso Räisänen =

Finnish freestyle skier

Personal information
- Nationality: Finnish
- Born: 1 October 1994 (age 30); Helsinki, Finland

Sport
- Sport: Freestyle skiing

Otso Räisänen (born 1 October 1994) is a Finnish freestyle skier. He was born in Helsinki. He competed at the 2014 Winter Olympics in Sochi, in slopestyle.
