= Marek Skála =

Czech freestyle skier (born 1989)

Personal information
- Nationality: Czech
- Born: 25 October 1989 (age 36) Prague

Sport
- Sport: Freestyle skiing

Marek Skála (born 25 October 1989 in Prague) is a Czech freestyle skier. He competed in slopestyle at the FIS Freestyle World Ski Championships 2013. He competed at the 2014 Winter Olympics in Sochi, in slopestyle.
