= Joss Christensen =

American freestyle skier

Personal information
- Born: December 20, 1991 (age 34) Salt Lake City, Utah, U.S.
- Height: 6 ft 1 in (185 cm)
- Weight: 174 lb (79 kg)
Medal record
Men's freestyle skiing
Representing the United States
Olympic Games
Gold medal – first place	2014 Sochi	Slopestyle
Winter X Games
Silver medal – second place	2015 Aspen	Slopestyle
New Zealand Winter Games
Gold medal – first place	2011 Cardrona	Big Air

Joss Christensen (born December 20, 1991) is an American freestyle skier from Park City, Utah. Christensen's highest sports accomplishment to date is winning a gold medal at the 2014 Winter Olympics in Sochi, Russia.
