= Jules Bonnaire =

French freestyle skier

Personal information
- Born: December 13, 1991 (age 34) Moûtiers, Savoie, France

Sport
- Country: France

Jules Bonnaire (born 13 December 1991 in Moûtiers) is a French freestyle skier. He is a participant at the 2014 Winter Olympics in Sochi.
