= Pavel Korpachev =

Russian freestyle skier

Personal information
- Born: 12 January 1986 (age 40) Sverdlovsk, Soviet Union

Sport
- Sport: Freestyle skiing

Pavel Nikolayevich Korpachev (Russian: Павел Николаевич Корпачёв; born 12 January 1986 in Sverdlovsk, Soviet Union) is a Russian freestyle skier. He was a participant at the 2014 Winter Olympics in Sochi.
