= Luca Tribondeau =

Austrian freestyle skier

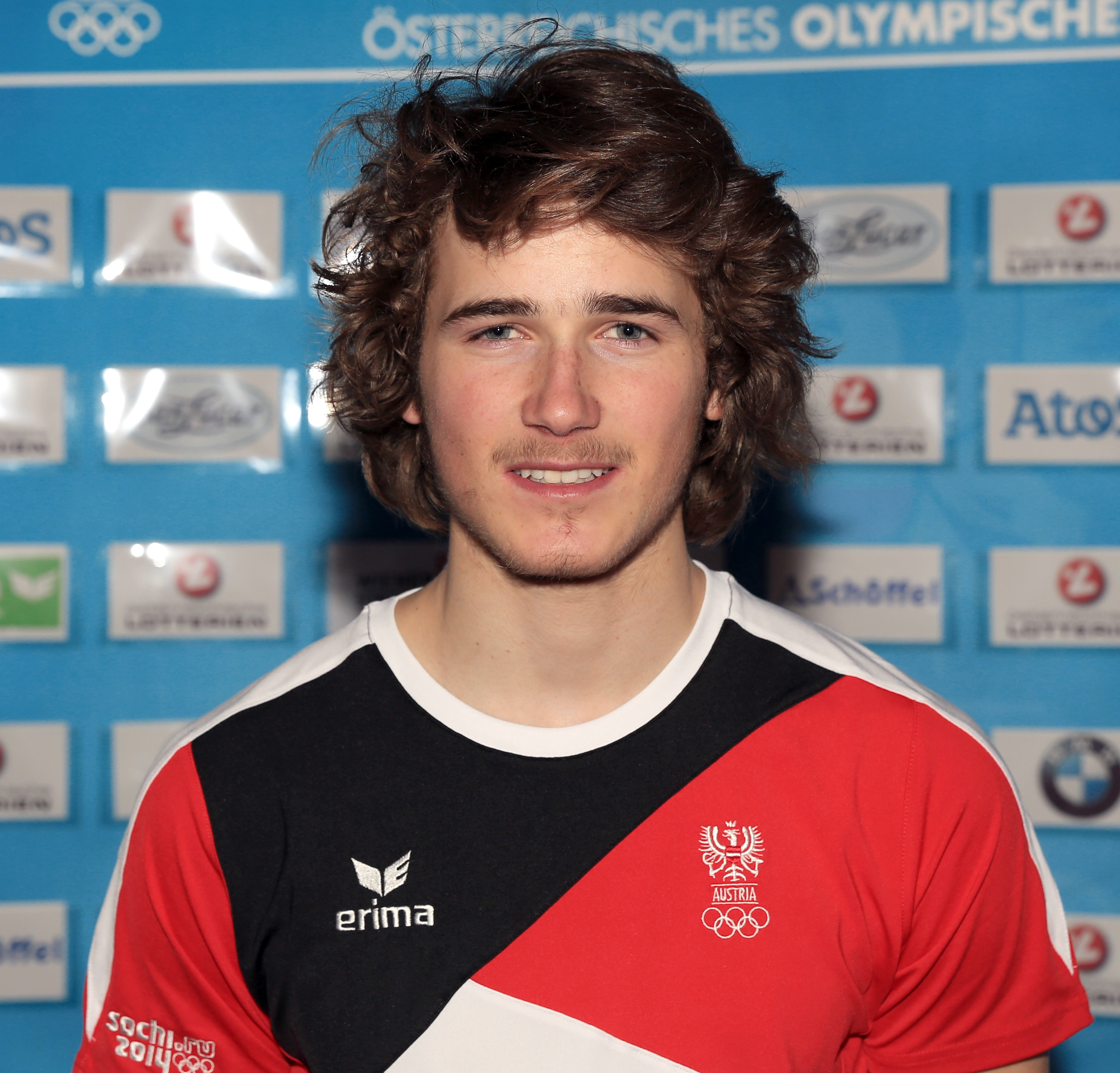

Personal information
- Nationality: Austrian
- Born: 3 August 1996 (age 28); Wolfsberg, Austria

Sport
- Sport: Freestyle skiing

Luca Tribondeau (born 3 August 1996) is an Austrian freestyle skier. He was born in Wolfsberg. He competed in slopestyle at the FIS Freestyle World Ski Championships 2013. He competed at the 2014 Winter Olympics in Sochi, in slopestyle.
