= Nick Goepper =

American freestyle skier (born 1994)

- Goepper in 2026

Personal information
- Full name: Nicholas Charles Goepper
- Born: March 14, 1994 (age 32) Ft. Wayne, Indiana, U.S.
- Education: Westminster College
- Height: 6 ft 0 in (183 cm)
- Weight: 160 lb (73 kg)

Sport
- Country: United States
- Sport: Freestyle skiing
- Event: Slopestyle
- Coached by: Mike Jankowski
Medal record
Men's freestyle skiing
Representing the United States
Olympic Games
Silver medal – second place	2018 Pyeongchang	Slopestyle
Silver medal – second place	2022 Beijing	Slopestyle
Bronze medal – third place	2014 Sochi	Slopestyle
World Championships
Silver medal – second place	2025 Engadin	Halfpipe
Bronze medal – third place	2013 Voss	Slopestyle
Bronze medal – third place	2019 Utah	Slopestlye
Winter X Games
Gold medal – first place	2013 Aspen	Slopestyle
Gold medal – first place	2014 Aspen	Slopestyle
Gold medal – first place	2015 Aspen	Slopestyle
Gold medal – first place	2021 Aspen	Slopestyle
Gold medal – first place	2025 Aspen	Superpipe
Silver medal – second place	2012 Aspen	Slopestyle
Silver medal – second place	2017 Norway	Slopestyle

Nicholas Charles Goepper (born March 14, 1994) is an American Olympic freestyle skier. Representing the United States, Goepper won a bronze medal at the 2014 Winter Olympics in Sochi, Russia, and won a silver medal at both the 2018 Winter Olympics in Pyeongchang, South Korea, and the 2022 Winter Olympics in Beijing, China. He has also won five gold medals and two silver medals at the Winter X Games. His sponsors include PowerBar, Red Bull, Kulkea, and Völkl.

== Early life ==
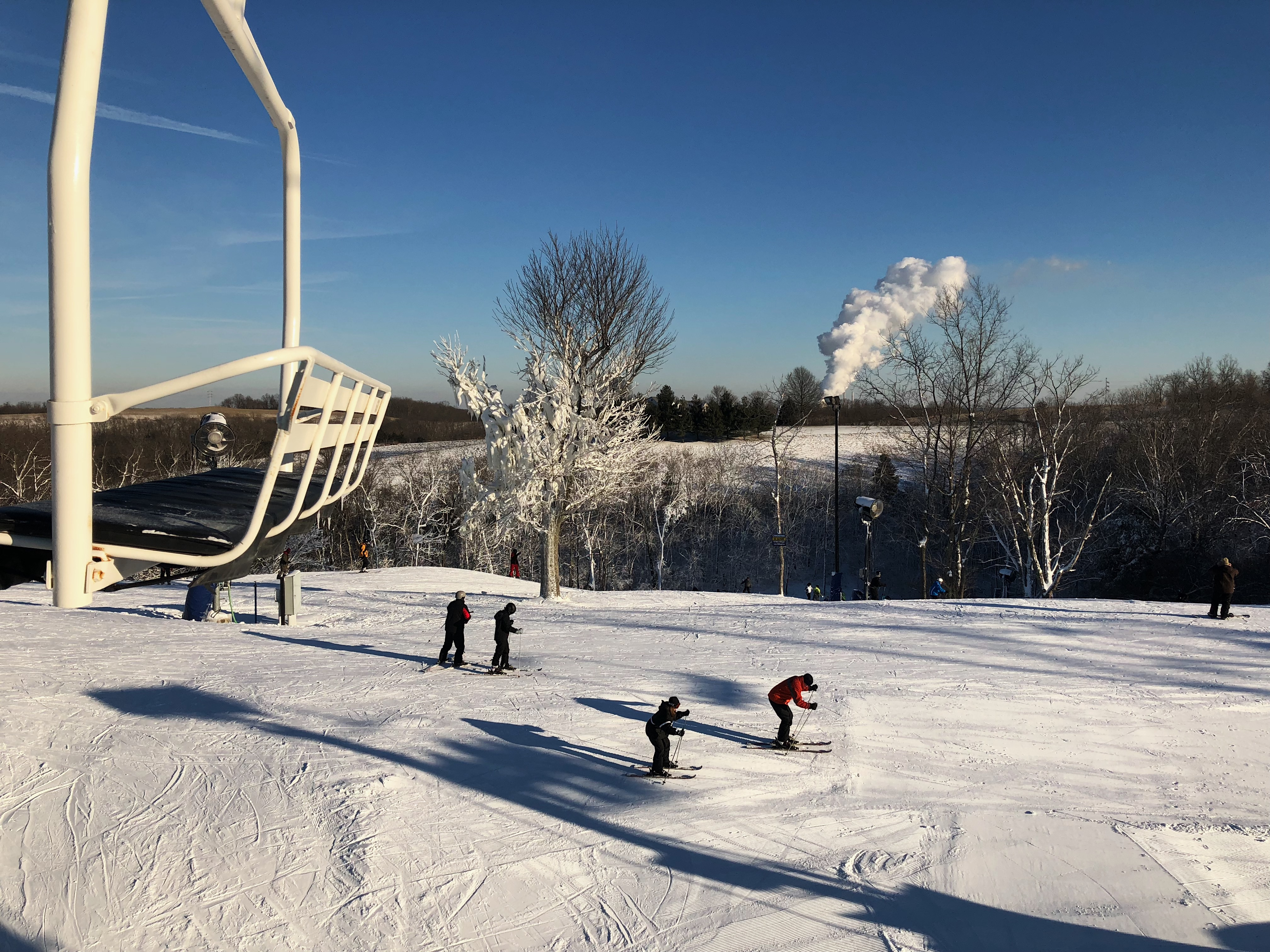
Perfect North Slopes in Lawrenceburg, IN.

Nick Goepper was born in Fort Wayne, Indiana, but raised in Lawrenceburg, Indiana. He has two younger sisters, one younger brother, and a cat. He began skiing at the age of five, started competing when he was eleven years old, and landed his first double backflip by thirteen.

== Career ==
In 2009, Goepper moved to Sandy, Oregon, where he attended school and trained with professional skiers at Windells Academy (now Wy'East Mountain Academy) on a full ride scholarship under Head Coach Mike Hanley. He also attended Westminster College. Goepper won a gold medal at the 2013–14 FIS Freestyle Skiing World Cup in Cardrona, New Zealand, and qualified for the 2014 Olympics at the 2013 Dew Tour in Breckenridge, Colorado. He placed first despite skiing with a broken hand and no poles.

In 2023, Goepper lost motivation to compete amidst mental health struggles. However, with support from his family and team he resumed training and eventually moved from slopestyle to halfpipe and qualified for the 2026 Winter Olympics in halfpipe, in a quest to become the first male skier to medal in both slopestyle and halfpipe.

== Awards ==
At the 2014 Winter Olympic Games, Nick Goepper, Gus Kenworthy, and Joss Christensen swept the medal podium, winning bronze, silver, and gold, respectively, in men's slopestyle skiing. The all American trio appeared on the Late Show with David Letterman in New York City and were also featured together on a Kellogg's Corn Flakes cereal box. He was also featured on a Jif peanut butter jar. Goepper's hometown threw a parade for him when he returned, and Perfect North Slopes gave him a lifelong pass. He also met former Indiana Governor Mike Pence and threw the opening pitch of the season for the Cincinnati Reds baseball team.

Following the Pyeongchang Olympics, Goepper was awarded the Sagamore of the Wabash Award, the most prestigious award an Indiana resident can receive. He later met President Donald Trump at the White House where he was mistakenly addressed as Mark Goepper.

== Philanthropy ==
In December 2014, Goepper partnered with Wy'East Mountain Academy (formerly Windells Academy) to host a rail jam competition at Perfect North Slopes, which attracted more than 150 participants with all proceeds donated to "The Cure Starts Now Foundation". Goepper also serves as a Trustee on Wy'East's inaugural not-for-profit board of trustees. In June 2017, he joined a group of Olympic athletes on a week mission trip to Kigali, Rwanda, organized by "Kids Play International".

== Public appearances ==
In 2014, Goepper and his mother were featured in the NBC Sports televised series How to Raise an Olympian sponsored by the P&G "Thank You, Mom" campaign. His mother, Linda, recalled Goepper spending all day skiing in the terrain park at Perfect North Slopes and building ramps/jumps in the family backyard to use year-round. Goepper talked about watching hours of freestyle skiing videos of professionals. His sisters, both gymnasts at the time, taught him flips and helped coach him before competitions. Goepper also mentioned selling candy bars on the school bus, mowing neighbors' lawns, and babysitting children to pay for his skiing-related expenses when his father, Chris, lost his job during the Great Recession.

Before heading to his first Olympics, Goepper attended the 71st Golden Globe Awards where he met celebrities like Usher, actor Leonardo DiCaprio, actress Reese Witherspoon, former professional boxer Mike Tyson, and singer Taylor Swift.

Before competing in his second Olympics, Goepper was interviewed by People Magazine. He said he had a panic attack throwing rocks at some cars shortly after the Sochi Olympics. However, he immediately confessed to the police and paid about $8,000 for damages. Goepper also shared his struggle with suicidal thoughts. "There came a point when I was drinking every day, and I was constantly thinking about ways to end my own life," he said. He was admitted into a rehabilitation center in Houston, Texas for two months and has since recovered.

== Personal life ==
On May 4, 2018, Goepper proposed to his girlfriend in Marco Island, Florida, and announced their engagement on Instagram with the caption, "She's stuck with me forever! Lizzy Braun-not-for-long" However, based on socials, it looks as though they are divorced and no longer living in the same state. They also do not follow each other on Instagram. Besides skiing, he enjoys surfing and skateboarding which he claims are helpful for cross-training.

In December 2014, Nick Goepper confessed to Dearborn County Sheriff's department that he was the "unknown local" who had been throwing rocks at traveling cars, damaging personal property & threatening driver safety. Goepper was forced to pay $8,000 in fines in lieu of jail time for reckless endangerment.

Nick Goepper's family attended the Olympics in Sochi, Russia, to cheer him on. Linda Goepper, Nick's mom, said that she never doubted her son being able to compete with the highest-ranked athletes.
