= Thomas Krief =

French freestyle skier

Personal information
- Born: 5 June 1993 (age 33) Grenoble, France

Sport
- Country: France
- Sport: Freestyle skiing
Medal record
Men's freestyle skiing
Representing France
FIS Freestyle World Ski Championships
| Bronze medal – third place | 2013 Voss | Halfpipe |

Thomas Krief (born 5 June 1993) is a French freestyle skier. He won a bronze medal at the 2013 FIS Freestyle World Ski Championships.
