= Aleksi Patja =

Finnish freestyle skier

Personal information
- Nationality: Finnish
- Born: 30 October 1995 (age 29); Rovaniemi, Finland

Sport
- Sport: Freestyle skiing

Aleksi Patja (born 30 October 1995) is a Finnish freestyle skier. He was born in Rovaniemi. He competed in slopestyle at the FIS Freestyle World Ski Championships 2013. He competed at the 2014 Winter Olympics in Sochi, in slopestyle.
