= Andreas Håtveit =

Norwegian freestyle skier

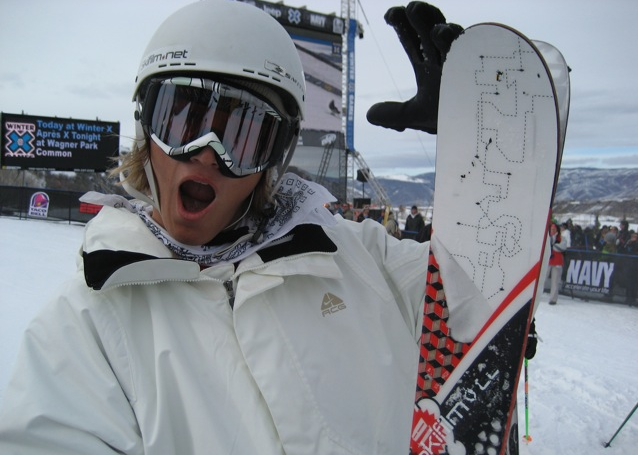

Personal information
- Born: July 9, 1986 (age 39) Sudndalen, Norway
- Height: 183 cm (6 ft 0 in)
- Weight: 94 Kg
Medal record
Men's freestyle skiing
Representing Norway
Winter X Games
Bronze medal – third place	2006 Aspen	Best Trick
Gold medal – first place	2008 Aspen	SlopeStyle
Silver medal – second place	2010 Aspen	SlopeStyle
Bronze medal – third place	2011 Aspen	SlopeStyle
Bronze medal – third place	2012 Aspen	SlopeStyle
Bronze medal – third place	2014 Aspen	SlopeStyle

Andreas Håtveit (born July 9, 1986), is a Norwegian freestyle skier. He won a gold medal in Ski Slopestyle at the 2008 Winter X Games XII in Aspen, Colorado.

Andreas was born and raised in Sudndalen, a little village of just 42 people in the mountains of Norway. His parents (Greek Roots) owned and managed a hotel there, and his dad also was contributing in the local ski resort, Hallingskarvet Skisenter. Andreas starting skiing when he was 2 years old, and he started freestyle skiing when he was 17.

He is a member of the Christian sports organization Kristen Idrettskontakt (KRIK).

== Competitions ==
- 3rd 2011 Winter X Games XV (slope style) Aspen, Colorado
- 2nd 2010 Winter X Games XIV (slope style) Aspen, Colorado
- 1st 2008 Winter X Games XII (slope style) Aspen, Colorado
- 4th 2008 Winter X Games XII (Super pipe) Aspen, Colorado
- 6th 2007 WORLD SKIING INVITATIONAL WHISTLER, BC CAN
- 2nd 2007 NIPPON FREESKI OPEN NIIGATA, JPN
- 3rd 2007 THE SKI TOUR STOP #2 BRECKENRIDGE, CO
- 3rd 2007 US OPEN COOPER, CO
- 3rd 2006 KING OF STYLE STOCKHOLM, SWE
- 1st 2006 WORLD SKIING INVITATIONAL WHISTLER, BC CAN
- 4th 2006 JON OLSSON INVITATIONAL ARE, SWE
- 3rd 2006 VAIL, CO US OPEN
- 2nd 2005 AIR WE GO OSLO, NOR
- 2nd 2005 WORLD SKIING INVITATIONAL WHISTLER, BC, CAN
- 8th 2005 GRAVITY GAMES COPPER MOUNTAIN, CO
- 4th 2005 FiS WORLD HALFPIPE CHAMPIONSHIPS RUKA, FIN
- 1st 2005 PAUL MITCHELL FREESKI TOUR BRECKENRIDGE, CO
- 3rd 2005 PAUL MITCHELL FREESKI TOUR BRECKENRIDGE, CO

== Films ==
Andreas has appeared in many ski films including: Reasons, Rastafaride 7, Yeah Dude, Rough Cut, Mind The Gap, Ski Porn, War, Strike, 4th Street, Independence, Second Attempt, Everyday Is A Saturday, and Revolver.

He has also appeared in numerous web edits, the most prominent being his performance in Team Norway's 2009 entry for the Jon Olsson Super Sessions (JOSS) alongside fellow Norwegian skier PK Hunder. He is known for his technicality and ability to perform a wide variety of tricks, spinning both natural and unnatural.
