= Elias Ambühl =

Swiss freestyle skier

Personal information
- Nationality: Swiss
- Born: 26 March 1992 (age 34) Masein, Switzerland

Sport
- Sport: Freestyle skiing
Medal record
Men's Freestyle skiing
Representing Switzerland
Winter X Games
Bronze medal – third place	2013 Aspen	Big Air
Bronze medal – third place	2015 Aspen	Big Air
Bronze medal – third place	2016 Aspen	Big Air

Elias Ambühl (born 26 March 1992) is a Swiss freestyle skier. He was born in Masein. He completed 1st in April 2011 at the Jon Olsson Invitational, he is the first skier to win with a triple cork. He competed in slopestyle at the FIS Freestyle World Ski Championships 2013.

Ambühl competed for Switzerland in slopestyle at the 2014 Winter Olympics in Sochi, finishing 22nd. He competed again at the 2018 Winter Olympics in PyeongChang, where he qualified for the slopestyle final along with two fellow Swiss skiers and finished a much improved 9th.
