= Aleksander Aurdal =

Norwegian freestyle skier (born 1988)

Personal information
- Nationality: Norwegian
- Born: 25 March 1988 (age 37) Bodø, Norway

Sport
- Sport: Freestyle skiing

Aleksander Aurdal (born 25 March 1988) is a Norwegian freestyle skier. He was born in Bodø. He competed at the 2014 Winter Olympics in Sochi, where he placed seventh in slopestyle.
