= Oscar Wester =

Swedish freestyle skier (born 1995)

Personal information
- Nationality: Swedish
- Born: 21 July 1995 (age 30)

Sport
- Sport: Freestyle skiing

Oscar Wester (born 21 June 1995) is a Swedish freestyle skier. He placed seventh in slopestyle at the FIS Freestyle World Ski Championships 2013. He represented Sweden in slopestyle at the 2014 Winter Olympics in Sochi and 2018 Winter Olympics in PyeongChang. His brother, Jacob Wester, also represents Sweden in skiing.
