= Øystein Bråten =

Norwegian freestyle skier (born 1995)

Personal information
- Born: 21 July 1995 (age 30)

Sport
- Country: Norway
- Sport: Freestyle skiing
Medal record
Men's Freestyle skiing
Representing Norway
Olympic Games
| Gold medal – first place | 2018 Pyeongchang | Slopestyle |
Winter X Games
| Gold medal – first place | 2017 Aspen | Slopestyle |
| Gold medal – first place | 2017 Norway | Slopestyle |
| Silver medal – second place | 2018 Aspen | Big Air |
| Silver medal – second place | 2018 Aspen | Slopestyle |
| Bronze medal – third place | 2016 Aspen | Slopestyle |

Øystein Bråten (born 21 July 1995) is a Norwegian freestyle skier. He competed at the 2014 Winter Olympics in Sochi, where he placed tenth in slopestyle. Bråten again competed in slopestyle at the 2018 Winter Olympics in Pyeongchang, in which he won a gold medal.

He is a brother of snowboarder Gjermund Bråten.
