= James Woods (freestyle skier) =

British freestyle skier (born 1992)

Personal information
- Nickname: Woodsy
- Nationality: British
- Born: 19 January 1992 (age 34) Sheffield, England
- Education: Tapton School
- Height: 1.70 m (5 ft 7 in)
- Weight: 67 kg (148 lb)

Sport
- Country: Great Britain
- Sport: Freestyle skiing
- Event: Slopestyle
Medal record
Men's freestyle skiing
Representing Great Britain
World Championships
Gold medal – first place	2019 Utah	Slopestyle
Silver medal – second place	2013 Voss	Slopestyle
Bronze medal – third place	2017 Sierra Nevada	Slopestlye
Winter X Games
Gold medal – first place	2017 Aspen	Big air
Bronze medal – third place	2013 Aspen	Slopestyle
Bronze medal – third place	2018 Aspen	Big air
Bronze medal – third place	2019 Aspen	Big air
New Zealand Winter Games
Gold medal – first place	2015 Naesby	Slopestyle
Silver medal – second place	2013 Cardrona	Slopestyle
Winter X Games Europe
Bronze medal – third place	2011 Tignes	Slopestyle
Bronze medal – third place	2017 Hafjell	Slopestyle

James Woods (born 19 January 1992) is a British freestyle skier. He has won six medals at FIS World Cup and two medals at FIS World Championships

Woods learned to ski at the Sheffield Ski Village near his family home. He won five consecutive British national championships in slopestyle between 2007 and 2011 in Laax. He took a bronze medal at the 2011 Winter X Games Europe, and that year he scored a third place at the King of style competition in Stockholm and also placed eighth on his debut at the FIS Freestyle World Ski Championships. In April 2012 he finished second in the slopestyle event at the World Skiing Invitational & AFP World Championships at Whistler Blackcomb. Woods won the FIS Freestyle Skiing World Cup for slopestyle in the 2012–13 season, winning two rounds along the way.

He travelled to Sochi in January 2014 for the 2014 Winter Olympics. However, he suffered a hip injury during a training session. In statements following the injury, he was said to be "progressing well", and the physios' goals were to "get Woods 100%". He competed in the slopestyle competition, where he made the final and finished in fifth. James got a second opportunity to represent Great Britain in slopestyle at the 2018 Winter Olympics in PyeongChang, where he again qualified for the finals. He performed well again and finished one spot better than in 2014, but still outside the medals in fourth place.

In January 2017, he took the gold medal in the Big Air competition at the Winter X Games XXI, having finished fourth in the Games' Slopestyle contest. He went on to take the Slopestyle bronze in the Winter X Games Europe in Hafjell in March and repeated the feat in the FIS Freestyle Ski and Snowboarding World Championships in the Spanish resort of Sierra Nevada later that month.

At the 2019 Freestyle Ski and Snowboarding World Championships in Utah, Woods took the gold medal in the slopestyle competition in poor weather, finishing ahead of Birk Ruud and Nick Goepper, who had pipped Woods to an Olympic medal on the final run of the slopestyle event in 2018. Shortly afterwards, he announced via YouTube that he would take a break from his ski career.
