= Benedikt Mayr =

German freestyle skier

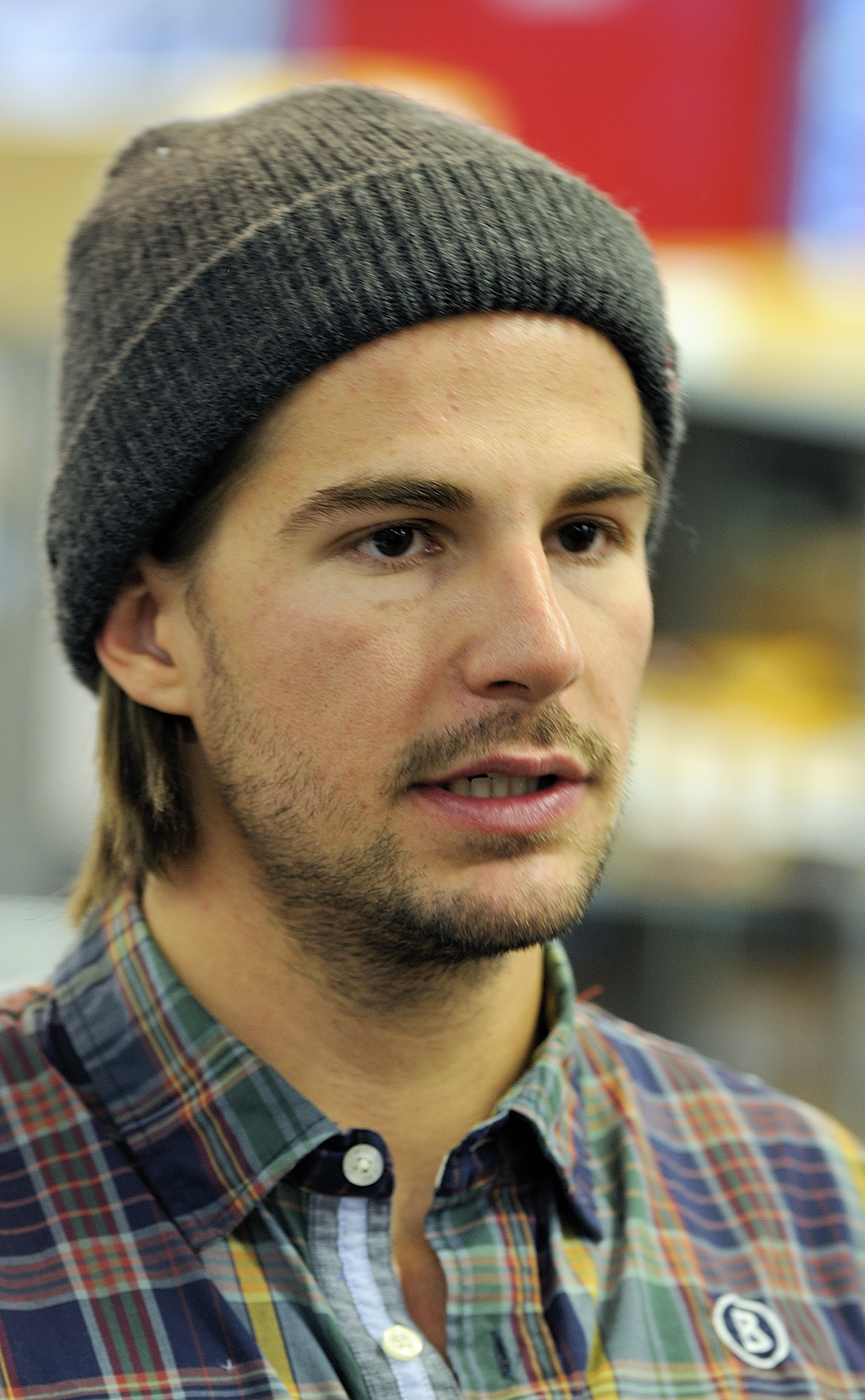

Benedikt "Bene" Mayr (born 14 March 1989) is a German freestyle skier. He was a participant at the 2014 Winter Olympics in Sochi.
