= Gus Kenworthy =

British-American freestyle skier

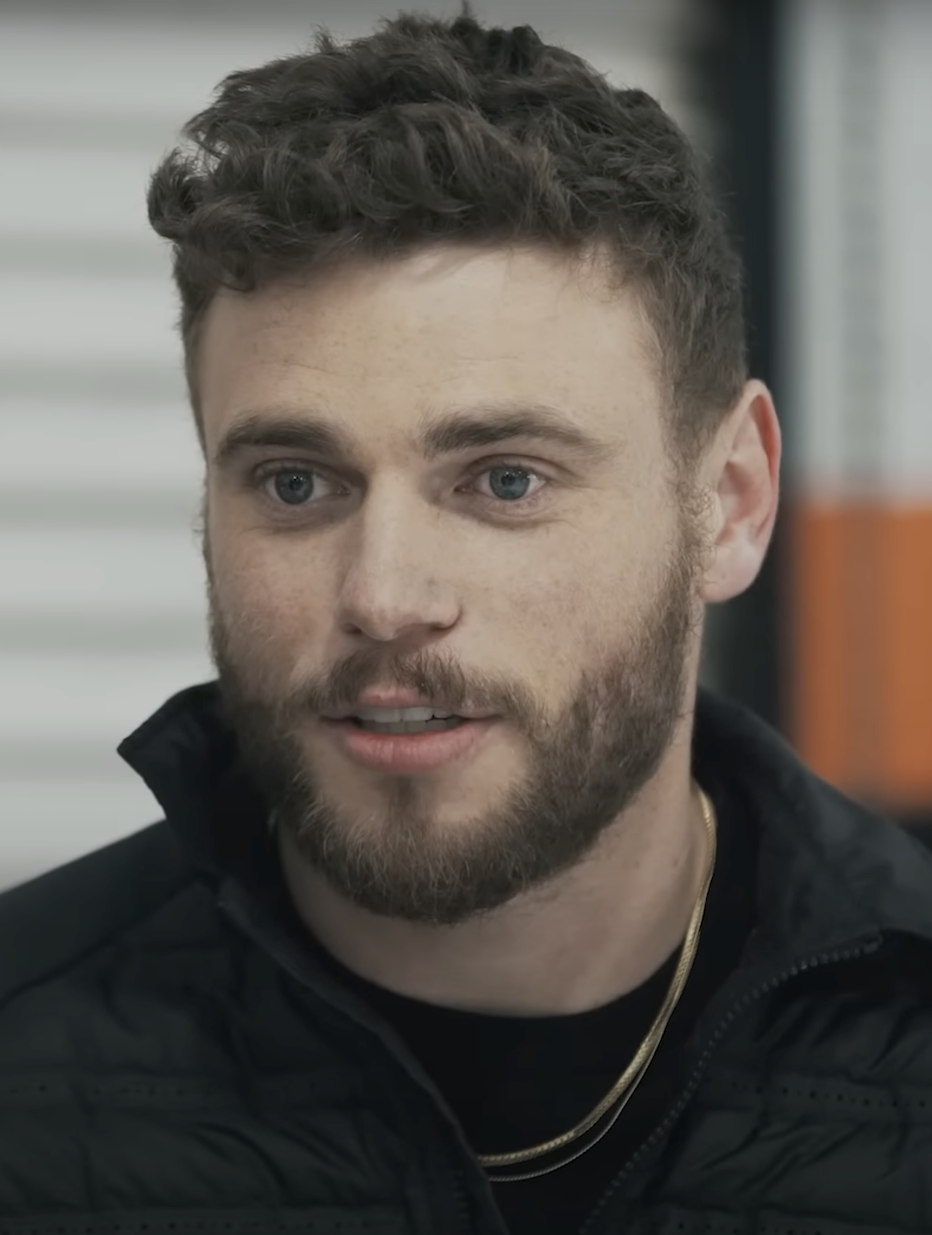
- Kenworthy in 2019

Personal information
- Nationality: British, American
- Born: Augustus Richard Kenworthy; October 1, 1991 (age 35) Chelmsford, Essex, England
- Height: 175 cm (5 ft 9 in)
- Weight: 75 kg (165 lb)

YouTube information
- Channel: Gus Kenworthy
- Years active: 2007–present
- Subscribers: 50.9 thousand
- Views: 8.1 million
- Last updated: January 26, 2026
Medal record
Men's freestyle skiing
Representing United States
Olympic Games
Silver medal – second place	2014 Sochi	Slopestyle
X Games
Silver medal – second place	2016 Aspen	Slopestyle
Silver medal – second place	2016 Aspen	Superpipe
Bronze medal – third place	2016 Oslo	Superpipe
Bronze medal – third place	2016 Oslo	Big Air
Bronze medal – third place	2013 Tignes	Slopestyle
New Zealand Winter Games
Gold medal – first place	2011 Cardrona	Slopestyle
Gold medal – first place	2011 Cardrona	Halfpipe
Winter Dew Tour
Silver medal – second place	2012 Breckenridge	Big Air
Gold medal – first place	2014 Breckenridge	Slopestyle
Gold medal – first place	2015 Breckenridge	Slopestyle
Gold medal – first place	Breckenridge 2016	Team Challenge
Bronze medal – third place	Breckenridge 2017	Team Challenge
Gold medal – first place	Breckenridge 2018	Team Challenge
FIS Freestyle World Ski Championships
Silver medal – second place	2017 Sierra Nevada	Slopestyle
Representing Great Britain
Ski World Cup
Gold medal – first place	Calgary 2020	Freestyle Halfpipe
Winter Dew Tour
Silver medal – second place	Copper 2020	Modified Superpipe

Augustus Richard Kenworthy (born October 1, 1991) is a British-American freestyle skier, actor, and YouTuber. He competes in slopestyle, halfpipe, and big air. Kenworthy won the silver medal in men's slopestyle at the 2014 Winter Olympics in Sochi. As of 2019 Kenworthy represents Great Britain. He was cast as Chet Clancy in the ninth season of the horror anthology series American Horror Story: 1984. He retired in 2022, but came out of retirement to compete at the 2026 Winter Olympics.

== Early life and education ==
Kenworthy was born in Chelmsford, Essex, to an English mother, Heather "Pip" Tyler, and an American father, Peter Kenworthy. He has two older brothers, Hugh and Nick Kenworthy.

In 1993, when Kenworthy was two years old, the family emigrated and settled in Telluride, Colorado, United States.

Kenworthy graduated from Telluride High School in June 2010. He could have graduated in 2009 but chose instead to take a year off to ski.

== Skiing career ==
Kenworthy won AFP World Championships overall titles in 2011, 2012, and 2013. In 2014, he placed second at the Olympics in Sochi, Russia and won his first medal, a bronze, at the X Games in Tignes, France in the slopestyle event. He won the World Cup Men's Halfpipe in Park City, Utah, in 2015 and again in 2016 in Mammoth, California, and finished second in 2017. He finished third in the Men's Slopestyle during the 2017 World Cup in Silvaplana, Switzerland.

In December 2019, he announced he would compete for his birth nation, Great Britain. In February 2020, he won his first gold medal as a competitor for Great Britain. In January 2022, he made his final X Games competition competing in the Superpipe final. He finished his X Games career having made 32 appearances in the event.

Kenworthy competed at the 2022 Winter Olympics, saying at the time that it would be his final Olympic games. He qualified for the final in 12th and finished 8th in the final.

== Media appearances ==
In 2019, Kenworthy guest starred on RuPaul's Drag Race All Stars season 4, Episode 3, "Snatch Game of Love", as one of the available bachelors. Kenworthy joined the main cast in the ninth season of FX's anthology series American Horror Story as Chet Clancy.

In 2017, Kenworthy was a cast member on the MTV series The Challenge: Champs vs. Pros, which featured former competitors as well as professional athletes.

== Personal life ==
In October 2015, Kenworthy publicly came out as gay in an interview with ESPN. Rolling Stone noted the "freestyle medalist is the first action-sports star to come out". He was in a relationship with Robin Macdonald, who was also involved in the ski industry, working in film and photography. The couple gained international media attention for their involvement with the issue of stray dogs in Sochi at the 2014 Winter Olympics.

From November 2015 to July 2019, Kenworthy was in a relationship with American theatre and film actor and reality television personality Matthew Wilkas. At the 2018 Winter Olympics, in Pyeongchang, South Korea, Wilkas kissed Kenworthy before his qualifying run in the men's slopestyle; the kiss was broadcast on live television and was lauded as being a significant moment for the visibility of LGBT athletes. In June 2017, Kenworthy received the Human Rights Campaign Visibility Award for his work in LGBT visibility in professional sports.

In 2022, it was revealed that Kenworthy had been dating Creative Artists Agency executive Adam Umhoefer for two years.

On August 4, 2026, Kenworthy proposed to his finance executive partner, Andrew Rigby in Mallorca, Spain after two years of dating.

=== Advocacy and charity activities ===
In 2018, Kenworthy was chosen by Fierté Montréal as one of the six grand marshals for the Pride Parade. He announced his participation in AIDS/LifeCycle in 2019, aiming to raise $1 million to fight HIV/AIDS. He joined approximately 2,000 other cyclists on a 7-day, 545-mile cycling trip from San Francisco to Los Angeles. He raised a total of $249,745.

Kenworthy said he did not believe that boycotting the 2022 Olympics in China would solve any international human rights situations, and while in China, he spoke out against "human rights atrocities".

Kenworthy said he received death threats after posting a message critical of US Immigration and Customs Enforcement prior to the 2026 Winter Olympics. Kenworthy had released a photograph on social media showing the words "fuck ICE" urinated into the snow.

== Filmography ==
=== Film ===
Year	Title	Role	Ref(s)
2019	Olympic Dreams	Gus	
2023	80 for Brady	Erik	
2023	The Sacrifice Game		
2024	Don't Tell Mom the Babysitter's Dead	Bruce	

=== Television ===
Year	Title	Role	Notes
2016	The Real O'Neals	Himself	Episode: "The Real Match"
2017	The Challenge: Champs vs. Pros	Himself	6 episodes
2017	Sharknado 5: Global Swarming	Skier	Television film
2018	RuPaul's Drag Race All Stars	Himself	Episode: "Snatch Game of Love"
2019	Beat Bobby Flay	Himself - Celebrity Judge	Episode: "Oh Brother"
2019	American Horror Story: 1984	Chet Clancy	9 episodes
2020	Will & Grace	Slutty Steve	Episode: "Filthy Phil, Part I"
2021	Coming Out Colton	Himself	Documentary
2023	Special Forces: World's Toughest Test	Himself - Contestant	Season 1 (8 episodes)

=== Web series ===
Year	Title	Role	Notes
2017	New York Is Dead	Pogo Ball Student	1 episode

=== Music videos ===
Year	Title	Artist	Notes
2022	"Taste So Good (The Cann Song)"	Vincint (featuring Hayley Kiyoko, MNEK, & Kesha)	

== See also ==
- Homosexuality in modern sports
- Homosexuality in sports in the United States
