= Jonas Hunziker =

Swiss freestyle skier

Personal information
- Born: 15 May 1994 (age 30)

Sport
- Country: Switzerland
- Sport: Freestyle skiing
- Event: Slopestyle

Jonas Hunziker (born 15 May 1994) is a Swiss freestyle skier who competes internationally.

He competed in the 2011, 2013 and 2015 FIS Freestyle World Ski Championships, and represented Switzerland at the 2018 Winter Olympics in PyeongChang, where he made the slopestyle final.
