= Russ Henshaw =

Australian freestyle skier (born 1990)

Personal information
- Born: 7 June 1990 (age 36) Campbelltown, New South Wales
- Height: 188 cm (6 ft 2 in)
- Weight: 85 kg (187 lb)

Sport
- Country: Australia
- Sport: Freestyle Skiing
- Event: Ski Slopestyle Men
Medal record
Men's freestyle skiing
Representing Australia
World Championships
Silver medal – second place	2015 Kreischberg	Slopestyle
Bronze medal – third place	2011 Deer Valley	Slopestyle
Winter X Games
Silver medal – second place	2011 Aspen	Slopestyle
New Zealand Winter Games
Bronze medal – third place	2013 Cardrona	Slopestyle
- Updated on 6 February 2014

Russ Henshaw (born 7 June 1990) is an Australian freestyle skier. He won a silver medal in Slopestyle at the 2011 Winter X Games XV in Aspen, Colorado, behind Sammy Carlson. Russ represented Australia in slopestyle at the 2018 Winter Olympics in PyeongChang, where he finished 19th.
