= FIS Freestyle World Ski Championships 2013 – Men's halfpipe =

The men's halfpipe competition of the FIS Freestyle World Ski Championships 2013 was held at Tryvann Ski Resort, Oslo, Norway on March 4 (qualifying) and March 5 (finals). 33 athletes from 15 countries competed.

== Qualification ==
The following are the results of the qualification.

Rank	Bib	Name	Country	Run 1	Run 2	Best	Notes
1	11	Matt Margetts	Canada	90.0	39.6	90.0	Q
2	2	David Wise	United States	86.4	89.8	89.8	Q
3	1	Torin Yater-Wallace	United States	88.4	54.6	88.4	Q
4	8	Joffrey Pollet-Villard	France	86.8	20.2	86.8	Q
5	3	Mike Riddle	Canada	85.2	6.8	85.2	Q
6	4	Thomas Krief	France	83.8	34.8	83.8	Q
7	10	Antti-Jussi Kemppainen	Finland	80.4	83.2	83.2	Q
8	12	Simon Dumont	United States	83.0	8.8	83.0	Q
9	5	Aaron Blunck	United States	25.8	82.8	82.8	Q
10	18	Simon d'Artois	Canada	80.6	64.2	80.6	Q
11	7	Noah Bowman	Canada	78.2	79.0	79.0	Q
12	6	Kevin Rolland	France	78.6	67.0	78.6	Q
13	37	Beau-James Wells	New Zealand	77.8	65.2	77.8	
14	16	Peter Crook	British Virgin Islands	76.0	75.8	76.0	
15	21	Jon Anders Lindstad	Norway	58.2	73.8	73.8	
16	20	Lyndon Sheehan	New Zealand	61.4	72.2	72.2	
17	15	Frederick Iliano	Switzerland	71.2	60.6	71.2	
18	22	Murray Buchan	Great Britain	65.8	68.8	68.8	
19	9	Josiah Wells	New Zealand	42.8	66.6	66.6	
20	23	Gurimu Narita	Japan	59.4	62.8	62.8	
21	25	Kristopher Atkinson	Canada	37.8	61.0	61.0	
22	26	Pavel Nabokikh	Russia	29.8	57.8	57.8	
23	33	Peter Speight	Great Britain	56.2	34.4	56.2	
24	17	Kiyoshi Terada	Japan	51.4	44.6	51.4	
25	32	Nikolaj Najdenov	Bulgaria	47.6	49.4	49.4	
26	27	Petr Kordyuk	Russia	48.8	44.0	48.8	
27	31	Marc Christen	Liechtenstein	47.0	45.0	47.0	
28	13	Kentaro Tsuda	Japan	45.4	42.4	45.4	
29	30	Artem Glebov	Russia	15.6	42.4	42.4	
30	24	Kim Kwang-jin	South Korea	9.4	40.0	40.0	
31	28	Markus Kaiser	Liechtenstein	22.4	38.6	38.6	
32	19	Nils Lauper	Switzerland	25.4	20.0	25.4	
33	34	Konstantinos Liketsos	Greece	19.0	12.6	19.0	

== Final ==
The following are the results of the final.

Rank	Bib	Name	Country	Run 1	Run 2	Best
1st place, gold medalist(s)	2	David Wise	United States	96.2	86.8	96.2
2nd place, silver medalist(s)	1	Torin Yater-Wallace	United States	95.6	31.6	95.6
3rd place, bronze medalist(s)	4	Thomas Krief	France	93.6	94.2	94.2
4	3	Mike Riddle	Canada	72.6	89.2	89.2
5	10	Antti-Jussi Kemppainen	Finland	86.8	27.8	86.8
6	5	Aaron Blunck	United States	84.2	28.4	84.2
7	6	Kevin Rolland	France	28.2	80.8	80.8
8	12	Simon Dumont	United States	78.4	16.0	78.4
9	18	Simon d'Artois	Canada	5.0	76.8	76.8
10	7	Noah Bowman	Canada	13.6	76.2	76.2
11	11	Matt Margetts	Canada	30.8	65.2	65.2
12	8	Joffrey Pollet-Villard	France	9.4	32.2	32.2
