= FIS Freestyle Ski and Snowboarding World Championships 2015 – Men's ski halfpipe =

The FIS Freestyle Ski and Snowboarding World Championships 2015 ski halfpipe competition was held at Kreischberg, Austria on January 21 (qualifying) and January 22 (finals).

The following are the results of the qualification.

Rank	Bib	Name	Country	Run 1	Run 2	Best	Notes
1	5	Kyle Smaine	United States	84.80	83.60	84.80	Q
2	10	Broby Leeds	United States	77.80	82.20	82.20	Q
3	2	Yannic Lerjen	Switzerland	78.80	81.60	81.60	Q
4	12	Fabian Meyer	Switzerland	80.40	30.60	80.40	Q
5	3	Matt Margetts	Canada	62.20	77.20	77.20	Q
6	7	Marco Ladner	Austria	74.40	76.40	76.40	Q
7	4	Joffrey Pollet-Villard	France	63.00	73.40	73.40	Q
8	1	Antti-Jussi Kemppainen	Finland	28.40	70.60	70.60	Q
9	11	Walter Wood	United States	69.00	58.40	58.40	Q
10	15	James Machon	Great Britain	66.00	57.20	66.00	Q
11	18	Kristopher Atkinson	Canada	5.00	65.60	65.60	
12	13	Jacob Beebe	United States	64.00	61.20	64.00	
13	6	Nicolas Bijasson	France	14.00	63.40	63.40	
14	17	Pavel Chupa	Russia	61.80	19.00	61.80	
15	21	Petr Kordyuk	Russia	59.60	54.00	59.60	
16	8	Andreas Gohl	Austria	59.00	23.80	59.00	
17	16	Kim Kwang-jin	South Korea	57.80	58.40	58.40	
18	20	Taylor Wilson	Canada	56.00	57.40	57.40	
19	9	Murray Buchan	Great Britain	53.40	56.60	56.60	
20	14	Kalle Hilden	Finland	17.80	7.20	17.80	
21	19	Lukas Müllauer	Austria	8.20	8.00	8.20	

== Final ==
The following are the results of the finals.

Rank	Bib	Name	Country	Run 1	Run 2	Run 3	Best
1st place, gold medalist(s)	5	Kyle Smaine	United States	88.00	35.60	27.20	88.00
2nd place, silver medalist(s)	4	Joffrey Pollet-Villard	France	81.20	86.60	17.40	86.60
3rd place, bronze medalist(s)	2	Yannic Lerjen	Switzerland	77.40	78.00	82.40	82.40
4	10	Broby Leeds	United States	78.40	65.80	81.00	81.00
5	11	Walter Wood	United States	75.20	69.00	62.40	75.20
6	7	Marco Ladner	Austria	23.80	69.80	72.40	72.40
7	12	Fabian Meyer	Switzerland	69.40	10.40	29.40	69.40
8	15	James Machon	Great Britain	61.80	63.00	67.40	67.40
9	3	Matt Margetts	Canada	27.80	46.00	18.60	46.00
10	1	Antti-Jussi Kemppainen	Finland	45.20	29.60	24.40	45.20
