= Freestyle skiing at the 2018 Winter Olympics – Women's aerials =

Women's aerials at the XXIII Olympic Winter Games
- Venue: Bogwang Phoenix Park, Pyeongchang, South Korea
- Dates: 15 February (qualification); 16 February (final)
- Competitors: 25 from 9 nations

Medalists
1st place, gold medalist(s)		Hanna Huskova	Belarus
2nd place, silver medalist(s)		Zhang Xin	China
3rd place, bronze medalist(s)		Kong Fanyu	China

The Women's aerials event in freestyle skiing at the 2018 Winter Olympics took place on 15 and 16 February 2018 at the Bogwang Phoenix Park, Pyeongchang, South Korea.

== Qualification ==
The top 25 athletes in the Olympic quota allocation list qualified, with a maximum of four athletes per National Olympic Committee (NOC) allowed. All athletes qualifying must also have placed in the top 30 FIS World Cup event or FIS Freestyle World Ski Championships during the qualification period (July 1, 2016 to January 21, 2018) and also have a minimum of 80 FIS points to compete. If the host country, South Korea at the 2018 Winter Olympics did not qualify, their chosen athlete would displace the last qualified athlete, granted all qualification criterion was met.

== Results ==
=== Qualification 1 ===
The qualification was held on 15 February at 20:00.

Rank	Bib	Name	Country	Score	Note
1	9	Alexandra Orlova	Olympic Athletes from Russia	102.22	Q
2	2	Hanna Huskova	Belarus	100.45	Q
3	1	Xu Mengtao	China	99.37	Q
4	3	Kristina Spiridonova	Olympic Athletes from Russia	97.64	Q
5	6	Danielle Scott	Australia	93.76	Q
6	29	Zhang Xin	China	90.24	Q
7	12	Kong Fanyu	China	89.77	
8	16	Liubov Nikitina	Olympic Athletes from Russia	88.83	
9	17	Madison Olsen	United States	87.88	
10	19	Olga Polyuk	Ukraine	82.21	
11	13	Ashley Caldwell	United States	81.81	
12	22	Zhanbota Aldabergenova	Kazakhstan	81.07	
13	20	Yan Ting	China	80.95	
14	27	Marzhan Akzhigit	Kazakhstan	79.17	
15	11	Alla Tsuper	Belarus	77.90	
16	18	Catrine Lavallée	Canada	73.08	
17	8	Kiley McKinnon	United States	72.26	
18	5	Lydia Lassila	Australia	66.27	
19	7	Laura Peel	Australia	64.86	
20	10	Alina Gridneva	Olympic Athletes from Russia	60.16	
21	26	Akmarzhan Kalmurzayeva	Kazakhstan	58.58	
22	14	Samantha Wells	Australia	54.28	
23	28	Ayana Zholdas	Kazakhstan	51.01	
24	4	Aliaksandra Ramanouskaya	Belarus	38.85	
25	30	Kim Kyoung-eun	South Korea	35.67	

=== Qualification 2 ===
The qualification was held on 15 February at 20:45.

Rank	Bib	Name	Country	Round 1	Round 2	Best	Note
1	11	Alla Tsuper	Belarus	77.90	99.37	99.37	Q
2	12	Kong Fanyu	China	89.77	95.17	95.17	Q
3	7	Laura Peel	Australia	64.86	89.46	89.46	Q
4	16	Liubov Nikitina	Olympic Athletes from Russia	88.83	84.24	88.83	Q
5	8	Kiley McKinnon	United States	72.26	87.88	87.88	Q
6	17	Madison Olsen	United States	87.88	80.04	87.88	Q
7	22	Zhanbota Aldabergenova	Kazakhstan	81.07	85.36	85.36	
8	4	Aliaksandra Ramanouskaya	Belarus	38.85	83.65	83.65	
9	20	Yan Ting	China	80.95	82.94	82.94	
10	19	Olga Polyuk	Ukraine	82.21	55.50	82.21	
11	13	Ashley Caldwell	United States	81.81	55.86	81.81	
12	27	Marzhan Akzhigit	Kazakhstan	79.17	70.20	79.17	
13	18	Catrine Lavallée	Canada	73.08	71.34	73.08	
14	5	Lydia Lassila	Australia	66.27	63.45	66.27	
15	10	Alina Gridneva	Olympic Athletes from Russia	60.16	60.98	60.98	
16	26	Akmarzhan Kalmurzayeva	Kazakhstan	58.58	47.32	58.58	
17	14	Samantha Wells	Australia	54.28	58.27	58.27	
18	28	Ayana Zholdas	Kazakhstan	51.01	57.98	57.98	
19	30	Kim Kyoung-eun	South Korea	35.67	44.20	44.20	

=== Finals ===
The final was held on 16 February at 20:00.

Rank	Bib	Name	Country	Round 1	Rank	Round 2	Rank	Round 3	Rank
1st place, gold medalist(s)	2	Hanna Huskova	Belarus	94.15	1	85.05	4	96.14	1
2nd place, silver medalist(s)	29	Zhang Xin	China	87.25	6	94.11	2	95.52	2
3rd place, bronze medalist(s)	12	Kong Fanyu	China	89.77	4	97.29	1	70.14	3
4	11	Alla Tsuper	Belarus	90.82	3	84.00	5	59.94	4
5	7	Laura Peel	Australia	85.05	9	85.65	3	55.34	5
6	17	Madison Olsen	United States	85.36	8	83.23	6	47.23	6
7	16	Liubov Nikitina	Olympic Athletes from Russia	85.68	7	80.01	7	did not advance	
8	9	Alexandra Orlova	Olympic Athletes from Russia	89.28	5	61.25	8	did not advance	
9	1	Xu Mengtao	China	91.00	2	59.25	9	did not advance	
10	8	Kiley McKinnon	United States	80.95	10	did not advance			
11	3	Kristina Spiridonova	Olympic Athletes from Russia	57.64	11	did not advance			
12	6	Danielle Scott	Australia	57.01	12	did not advance			
