= FIS Freestyle Ski and Snowboarding World Championships 2017 – Women's aerials =

The women's aerials competition of the FIS Freestyle Ski and Snowboarding World Championships 2017 was held at Sierra Nevada, Spain on March 9 (qualifying) and March 10 (finals). 22 athletes from 9 countries competed.

== Qualification ==
The following are the results of the qualification.

Rank	Bib	Name	Country	Q1	Q2	Notes
1	10	Ashley Caldwell	United States	103.68		Q
2	6	Laura Peel	Australia	91.65		Q
3	1	Xu Mengtao	China	89.77		Q
4	12	Samantha Wells	Australia	88.83		Q
5	2	Danielle Scott	Australia	87.06		Q
6	3	Lydia Lassila	Australia	85.65		Q
7	5	Liubov Nikitina	Russia	83.89	95.52	Q
8	7	Kristina Spiridonova	Russia	84.42	91.65	Q
9	17	Zhang Xin	China	82.53	90.24	Q
10	21	Madison Olsen	United States	76.85	83.16	Q
11	13	Catrine Lavallee	Canada	82.84	79.75	Q
12	9	Kiley McKinnon	United States	65.91	81.90	Q
13	24	Anastasiya Novosad	Ukraine	80.32	71.34	
14	20	Elle Gaudette	United States	25.23	80.32	
15	15	Olga Polyuk	Ukraine	79.06	52.20	
16	8	Alexandra Orlova	Russia	76.23	62.64	
17	30	Zhanbota Aldabergenova	Kazakhstan	52.85	63.04	
18	23	Marzhan Akzhigit	Kazakhstan	38.19	64.48	
19	11	Aliaksandra Ramanouskaya	Belarus	52.85	63.04	
20	14	Yu Yang	China	57.64	59.92	
21	29	Akmarzhan Kalmurzayeva	Kazakhstan	46.11	57.98	
22	26	Kim Kyoungeun	South Korea	47.15	48.00	

== Final ==
The following are the results of the finals.

Rank	Bib	Name	Country	Final 1	Final 2	Final 3
1st place, gold medalist(s)	11	Ashley Caldwell	United States	73.34	103.27	109.29
2nd place, silver medalist(s)	2	Danielle Scott	Australia	81.27	84.95	94.47
3rd place, bronze medalist(s)	1	Xu Mengtao	China	83.79	80.01	91.65
4	9	Kiley McKinnon	United States	83.16	74.24	90.94
5	21	Madison Olsen	United States	73.95	75.60	70.98
6	17	Zhang Xin	China	82.53	74.62	62.39
7	13	Catrine Lavallee	Canada	85.05	71.34	
8	6	Laura Peel	Australia	80.32	62.39	
9	7	Kristina Spiridonova	Russia	81.58	55.34	
10	12	Samantha Wells	Australia	69.30		
11	3	Lydia Lassila	Australia	62.37		
12	5	Liubov Nikitina	Russia	60.76		
