= Freestyle skiing at the Winter World University Games =

- Events: 10 (men: 5; women: 5)

Games
- 1959; 1960; 1961; 1962; 1963; 1964; 1965; 1966; 1967; 1968; 1970; 1970; 1973; 1972; 1975; 1975; 1977; 1978; 1979; 1981; 1983; 1985; 1987; 1989; 1991; 1993; 1995; 1997; 1999; 2001; 2003; 2005; 2007; 2009; 2011; 2013; 2015; 2017; 2019; 2023; 2025

The first appearance of freestyle skiing at the Winter Universiade was as an optional sport in the 2005 edition which was held in Innsbruck, Austria. Due to the growing demand, the Fédération Internationale du Sport Universitaire decided to making it a mandatory sporting starting in 2021.

== Events ==
Event	05	09	11	13	15	17	19	Years
Men's aerials		•				•	•	3
Men's moguls			•		•	•	•	4
Men's dual moguls						•	•	2
Men's halfpipe					•			1
Men's slopestyle				•	•			2
Men's skicross	•	•	•	•	•	•	•	7
Women's aerials		•				•	•	3
Women's moguls			•		•	•	•	4
Women's dual moguls						•	•	2
Women's halfpipe					•			1
Women's slopestyle				•	•			2
Women's skicross	•	•	•	•	•	•	•	7
Team aerials		•				•		2

== Medalists ==
=== Men ===
==== Aerials ====
Year	Gold	Silver	Bronze
2005–2007	not included in the program		
2009	(China) Jia Zongyang	(China) Liu Zhongqing	(China) Wu Chao
2011–2015	not included in the program		
2017	(China) Li Zhonglin	(Belarus) Artsiom Bashlakou	(China) Guo Ziming
2019	(Russia) Maxim Burov	(China) Li Zhonglin	(Russia) Ruslan Katmanov
2023–2025	not included in the program		

==== Big air ====
Year	Gold	Silver	Bronze
2023	(Germany) Jakob Gessnerg	(Thailand) Paul Vieuxtemps	(Czech Republic) Vojtěch Břeský
2025	(Slovenia) Klemen Vidmar	(Ukraine) Oleh Boiko	(Czech Republic) Marek Krcal

==== Moguls ====
Year	Gold	Silver	Bronze
2005–2009	not included in the program		
2011	(Russia) Aleksandr Kerner	(Russia) Evgeny Mikhailov	(Kazakhstan) Denis Moisseyev
2013	not included in the program		
2015	(Kazakhstan) Pavel Kolmakov	(Kazakhstan) Dmitriy Reiherd	(Russia) Sergei Shimbuev
2017	(Kazakhstan) Dmitriy Reiherd	(Russia) Sergei Shimbuev	(Kazakhstan) Pavel Kolmakov
2019	(France) Benjamin Cavet	(Japan) Daichi Hara	(Japan) Ikuma Horishima
2023	not included in the program		
2025	(Finland) Akseli Ahvenainen	(Japan) Shugo Kano	(Canada) Quinn Dawson

==== Dual moguls ====
Year	Gold	Silver	Bronze
2005–2015	not included in the program		
2017	(Kazakhstan) Dmitriy Reiherd	(Russia) Sergei Shimbuev	(Kazakhstan) Pavel Kolmakov
2019	(Japan) Ikuma Horishima	(Kazakhstan) Pavel Kolmakov	(France) Benjamin Cavet
2023	not included in the program		
2025	(Japan) Shima Kawaoka	(Kazakhstan) Anton Bondarev	(United States) Jackson Crockett

==== Halfpipe ====
Year	Gold	Silver	Bronze
2005–2013	not included in the program		
2015	(United States) John Leonard	(South Korea) Kim Kwang-jin	(Russia) Pavel Chupa
2017–2025	not included in the program		

==== Slopestyle ====
Year	Gold	Silver	Bronze
2005–2011	not included in the program		
2013	(Finland) Kalle Leinonen	(Poland) Szczepan Karpiel	(Netherlands) Janne van Enckevort
2015	(Austria) Fabian Braitsch	(United States) Broby Leeds	(United States) Cody Potter
2017	not included in the program		
2019	(Germany) Tobias Müller	(France) Eliot Gorry	(Switzerland) Jona Schmidhalter
2023	(Japan) Rai Kasamura	(Japan) Manatsu Sato	(Thailand) Paul Vieuxtemps
2025	(France) Hugo Picoet	(Estonia) Stefan Sorokin	(Slovenia) Klemen Vidmar

==== Skicross ====
Year	Gold	Silver	Bronze
2005	(Finland) Juha Haukkala	(Austria) David Fiegl	(Germany) Simon Willmann
2009	(France) Antonie Gallard	(Germany) Andreas Tischendorf	(Switzerland) Manuel Eicher
2011	(Switzerland) Manuel Eicher	(Russia) Georgii Kornilov	(France) Olivier Fabre
2013	(Poland) Mateusz Harbat	(Russia) Igor Omelin	(Czech Republic) Jiří Čech
2015	(Austria) Bernhard Graf	(Switzerland) Timothe Henzi	(Russia) Igor Omelin
2017	(Czech Republic) Jiří Čech	(Russia) Kirill Merenkov	(Switzerland) Enrico Fromm
2019	(Russia) Artem Nabiulin	(Russia) Maxim Vikhrov	(Germany) Florian Wilmsmann
2023	(United Kingdom) Scott Johns	(Germany) Tim-Ole Mietz	(Germany) Niklas Illig
2025	(Sweden) Erik Wahlberg	(Japan) Sassaoka Soral	(Japan) Yamato Asakawa

=== Women ===
==== Aerials ====
Year	Gold	Silver	Bronze
2005–2007	not included in the program		
2009	(China) Li Nina	(China) Cheng Shuang	(China) Dai Shuangfei
2011–2015	not included in the program		
2017	(China) Zhu Yingying	(Kazakhstan) Zhibek Arapbayeva	(Kazakhstan) Zhanbota Aldabergenova
2019	(Belarus) Aliaksandra Ramanouskaya	(Russia) Liubov Nikitina	(Kazakhstan) Zhanbota Aldabergenova
2023–2025	not included in the program		

==== Big air ====
Year	Gold	Silver	Bronze
2023	(Japan) Koga Yuna	(Switzerland) Michelle Rageth	(Finland) Viivi Paljärvi
2025	(France) Victoire Tillier	(Ukraine) Mariia Aniichyn	(France) Amélie Cancel

==== Moguls ====
Year	Gold	Silver	Bronze
2005–2009	not included in the program		
2011	(Kazakhstan) Darya Rybalova	(Russia) Irina Pisarevskaya	(Russia) Alena Zueva
2013	not included in the program		
2015	(Kazakhstan) Yulia Galysheva	(Russia) Marika Pertakhiya	(South Korea) Seo Jee-won
2017	(Kazakhstan) Yulia Galysheva	(Russia) Anastasiya Pervushina	(Austria) Katharina Ramsauer
2019	(Japan) Kisara Sumiyoshi	(Germany) Lea Bouard	(Germany) Sophie Weese
2023	not included in the program		
2025	(Kazakhstan) Anastassiya Gorodko	(Japan) Haruka Nakao	(Germany) Hanna Weese

==== Dual moguls ====
Year	Gold	Silver	Bronze
2005–2015	not included in the program		
2017	(Kazakhstan) Yulia Galysheva	(Russia) Elizabeta Bezgodova	(Austria) Katharina Ramsauer
2019	(Germany) Lea Bouard	(Japan) Kisara Sumiyoshi	(Russia) Elizaveta Bezgodova
2023	not included in the program		
2025	(Kazakhstan) Anastassiya Gorodko	(Kazakhstan) Ayaulym Amrenova	(Japan) Ito Marin

==== Halfpipe ====
Year	Gold	Silver	Bronze
2005–2013	not included in the program		
2015	(France) Marine Tripier Mondancin	(Russia) Elizavetta Chesnokova	(Germany) Julie Seifert
2017–25	not included in the program		

==== Slopestyle ====
Year	Gold	Silver	Bronze
2005–2011	not included in the program		
2013	(United States) Alexis Keeney	(Switzerland) Fabienne Werder	(United States) Katie Souza
2015	(United States) Brooke Potter	(Slovakia) Zuzana Stromková	(Austria) Stefanie Moessler
2017	not included in the program		
2019	(Russia) Lana Prusakova	(Russia) Anastasia Tatalina	(France) Lou Barin
2023	(Japan) Koga Yuna	(Switzerland) Michelle Rageth	(Finland) Thea Feinwick
2025	(France) Victorie Tillier	(United Kingdom) Lara Jane Shaw	(France) Amélie Cancel

==== Skicross ====
Year	Gold	Silver	Bronze
2005	(Austria) Karin Huttary	(Finland) Jenni Kilpinen	(Germany) Alexandra Grauvogl
2009	(Austria) Katrin Ofner	(France) Carlotta Nicoletta	(Russia) Julija Liwinska
2011	(Germany) Christina Manhard	(Germany) Julia Manhard	(Russia) Darya Vasilyeva
2013	(Russia) Daria Nikolaeva	(Russia) Violetta Kovalskaya	(Russia) Viktoria Strunk
2015	(Czech Republic) Nikol Kučerová	(Russia) Lidia Pentukhova	(United States) Tania Prymak
2017	(Russia) Anna Antonova	(Russia) Mayya Averynova	(Russia) Ekaterina Maltseva
2019	(Russia) Ekaterina Maltseva	(Russia) Anna Antonova	(Czech Republic) Klára Kašparová
2023	(Japan) Nakanishi Lin	(Slovakia) Nikola Fričová	(Canada) Elizabeth Filiatrault
2025	(Italy) Nathalie Bernard	(Austria) Isabel Hofherr	(Canada) Sage Stefani

=== Mixed ===
==== Aerials team ====
Year	Gold	Silver	Bronze
2005–2007	not included in the program		
2009	(China) Jia Zongyang; Liu Zhongqing; Li Nina	(Belarus) Timofei Slivets; Denis Osipau; Maria Shcherbina	(Russia) Vladimir Lebedev; Yury Shapkin; Anna Zukal
2009–2015	not included in the program		
2017	(Kazakhstan) Zhanbota Aldabergenova; Baglan Inkarbek	(China) Xu Nuo; Shi Haitao	(China) Zhu Yingying; Guo Ziming
2019	(Belarus) Aliaksandra Ramanouskaya; Artsiom Bashlakou	(Russia) Kristina Spiridonova; Stanislav Nikitin	(Russia) Liubov Nikitina; Maxim Burov
2023–2025	not included in the program		

== Medal table ==
Last updated after the 2025 Winter World University Games

Rank	Nation	Gold	Silver	Bronze	Total
1	Kazakhstan (KAZ)	10	5	5	20
2	Russia (RUS)	7	19	11	37
3	Japan (JPN)	7	6	3	16
4	France (FRA)	6	2	5	13
5	China (CHN)	5	4	4	13
6	Germany (GER)	4	4	8	16
7	Austria (AUT)	4	2	3	9
8	United States (USA)	3	1	4	8
9	Finland (FIN)	3	1	1	5
10	Belarus (BLR)	2	2	0	4
11	Czech Republic (CZE)	2	0	4	6
12	Switzerland (SUI)	1	4	4	9
13	Great Britain (GBR)	1	1	1	3
14	Poland (POL)	1	1	0	2
15	Slovenia (SLO)	1	0	1	2
16	Italy (ITA)	1	0	0	1
16	Sweden (SWE)	1	0	0	1
18	Slovakia (SVK)	0	2	0	2
18	Ukraine (UKR)	0	2	0	2
20	South Korea (KOR)	0	1	1	2
20	Thailand (THA)	0	1	1	2
22	Estonia (EST)	0	1	0	1
23	Canada (CAN)	0	0	3	3
Totals (23 entries)		59	59	59	177
