= FIS Freestyle Ski and Snowboarding World Championships 2017 – Men's ski slopestyle =

The men's ski slopestyle competition of the FIS Freestyle Ski and Snowboarding World Championships 2017 was held at Sierra Nevada, Spain on March 18 (qualifying) and March 19 (finals). 56 athletes from 26 countries competed.

== Qualification ==
The following are the results of the qualification.

=== Heat 1 ===
| Rank | Bib | Name | Country | Score | Notes |
|---|---|---|---|---|---|
| 1 | 1 | McRae Williams | United States | 94.00 | Q |
| 2 | 4 | Jesper Tjäder | Sweden | 93.00 | Q |
| 3 | 16 | Alexander Hall | United States | 92.66 | Q |
| 4 | 13 | Evan McEachran | Canada | 91.00 | Q |
| 5 | 9 | Antoine Adelisse | France | 89.33 | Q |
| 6 | 8 | Russell Henshaw | Australia | 88.33 | Q |
| 7 | 29 | Aleksi Patja | Finland | 83.66 | SF |
| 8 | 21 | Oliwer Magnusson | Sweden | 79.00 | SF |
| 9 | 28 | Tyler Harding | Great Britain | 66.66 | SF |
| 10 | 46 | Haugaard Thomas Trads | Denmark | 53.00 | SF |
| 11 | 51 | Cal Sandieson | Great Britain | 47.33 | SF |
| 12 | 50 | John Brown | Ireland | 46.33 | SF |
| 13 | 12 | Joona Kangas | Finland | 46.00 | SF |
| 14 | 37 | Fabian Kettner | Austria | 42.00 | SF |
| 15 | 45 | Ryley Lucas | Australia | 40.00 | SF |
| 16 | 20 | Henrik Harlaut | Sweden | 36.33 | SF |
| 17 | 5 | Teal Harle | Canada | 30.66 | SF |
| 18 | 34 | Lukas Müllauer | Austria | 30.33 | SF |
| 19 | 32 | Michael Rowlands | Great Britain | 13.00 | SF |
| 20 | 47 | Andre Hamm | Costa Rica | 12.66 | SF |
| 21 | 17 | Øystein Bråten | Norway | 10.66 | SF |
| 22 | 56 | Victor White | Barbados | 10.00 | SF |
| 23 | 48 | Igor Lastei | Italy | 8.66 | SF |
| 24 | 25 | Mees Van Lierop | Netherlands | 8.00 | SF |
| 25 | 42 | Denis Nekrasov | Russia | 8.00 | SF |
| 26 | 60 | Nahuel Medrano | Argentina | 4.66 | SF |
| 27 | 24 | Joss Christensen | United States | 4.33 | SF |
| 28 | 36 | Luke Hughes | New Zealand | 3.66 | SF |

=== Heat 2 ===
| Rank | Bib | Name | Country | Score | Notes |
|---|---|---|---|---|---|
| 1 | 14 | Alex Beaulieu-Marchand | Canada | 94.66 | Q |
| 2 | 19 | Christian Nummedal | Norway | 91.00 | Q |
| 3 | 2 | Andri Ragettli | Switzerland | 87.66 | Q |
| 4 | 7 | James Woods | Great Britain | 86.00 | Q |
| 5 | 35 | Birk Ruud | Norway | 84.33 | Q |
| 6 | 6 | Alex Bellemare | Canada | 79.66 | Q |
| 7 | 41 | Carlos Aguareles Loan | Andorra | 78.33 | SF |
| 8 | 30 | Ralph Welponer | Italy | 75.33 | SF |
| 9 | 40 | Luca Tribondeau | Austria | 72.33 | SF |
| 10 | 27 | Benoit Buratti | France | 70.00 | SF |
| 11 | 33 | Viktor Moosmann | Austria | 65.00 | SF |
| 12 | 18 | Robby Franco | Mexico | 62.66 | SF |
| 13 | 26 | Luca Schuler | Switzerland | 59.66 | SF |
| 14 | 43 | Robin Holub | Czech Republic | 41.33 | SF |
| 15 | 11 | Felix Stridsberg-Usterud | Norway | 39.66 | SF |
| 16 | 53 | Lee Kang-Bok | South Korea | 38.00 | SF |
| 17 | 10 | Finn Bilous | New Zealand | 24.66 | SF |
| 18 | 22 | Jackson Wells | New Zealand | 19.33 | SF |
| 19 | 38 | Florian Preuss | Germany | 14.00 | SF |
| 20 | 54 | Javier Lliso | Spain | 13.33 | SF |
| 21 | 23 | Emil Granbom | Sweden | 10.33 | SF |
| 22 | 49 | Rasmus Dalberg Joergensen | Denmark | 8.33 | SF |
| 23 | 15 | Gus Kenworthy | United States | 6.00 | SF |
| 24 | 3 | Colin Wili | Switzerland | 4.33 | SF |
| | 31 | Eetu Rintamaa | Finland | DNS | |
| | 39 | Elias Ambuehl | Switzerland | DNS | |
| | 52 | Simon Bartik | Czech Republic | DNS | |
| | 55 | Maj Stirn | Slovenia | DNS | |

== Semifinal ==
The following are the results of the semifinal.

| Rank | Bib | Name | Country | Score | Notes |
|---|---|---|---|---|---|
| 1 | 5 | Teal Harle | Canada | 88.80 | Q |
| 2 | 15 | Gus Kenworthy | United States | 84.20 | Q |
| 3 | 20 | Henrik Harlaut | Sweden | 83.40 | Q |
| 4 | 10 | Finn Bilous | New Zealand | 80.40 | Q |
| 5 | 21 | Oliwer Magnusson | Sweden | 79.20 | |
| 6 | 18 | Robby Franco | Mexico | 78.00 | |
| 7 | 28 | Tyler Harding | Great Britain | 75.80 | |
| 8 | 22 | Jackson Wells | New Zealand | 71.80 | |
| 9 | 40 | Luca Tribondeau | Austria | 68.80 | |
| 10 | 30 | Ralph Welponer | Italy | 67.40 | |
| 11 | 42 | Denis Nekrasov | Russia | 64.20 | |
| 12 | 3 | Colin Wili | Switzerland | 63.00 | |
| 13 | 38 | Florian Preuss | Germany | 58.20 | |
| 14 | 43 | Robin Holub | Czech Republic | 57.00 | |
| 15 | 49 | Rasmus Dalberg Joergensen | Denmark | 54.80 | |
| 16 | 46 | Haugaard Thomas Trads | Denmark | 50.20 | |
| 17 | 50 | John Brown | Ireland | 47.60 | |
| 18 | 12 | Joona Kangas | Finland | 45.60 | |
| 19 | 23 | Emil Granbom | Sweden | 41.80 | |
| 20 | 37 | Fabian Kettner | Austria | 39.80 | |
| 21 | 33 | Viktor Moosmann | Austria | 38.00 | |
| 22 | 34 | Lukas Müllauer | Austria | 34.80 | |
| 23 | 56 | Victor White | Barbados | 32.80 | |
| 24 | 24 | Joss Christensen | United States | 29.60 | |
| 25 | 36 | Luke Hughes | New Zealand | 26.00 | |
| 26 | 45 | Ryley Lucas | Australia | 25.60 | |
| 27 | 60 | Nahuel Medrano | Argentina | 23.40 | |
| 28 | 41 | Carlos Aguareles Loan | Andorra | 16.60 | |
| 29 | 29 | Aleksi Patja | Finland | 16.20 | |
| 30 | 27 | Benoit Buratti | France | 5.80 | |
| 31 | 47 | Andre Hamm | Costa Rica | 5.00 | |
| 32 | 48 | Igor Lastei | Italy | 4.60 | |
| 33 | 54 | Javier Lliso | Spain | 4.40 | |
| | 26 | Luca Schuler | Switzerland | DNS | |
| | 51 | Cal Sandieson | Great Britain | DNS | |
| | 11 | Felix Stridsberg-Usterud | Norway | DNS | |
| | 53 | Lee Kang-Bok | South Korea | DNS | |
| | 32 | Michael Rowlands | Great Britain | DNS | |
| | 17 | Øystein Bråten | Norway | DNS | |
| | 25 | Mees Van Lierop | Netherlands | DNS | |

== Final ==
The following are the results of the finals.

| Rank | Bib | Name | Country | Score |
|---|---|---|---|---|
| 1st place, gold medalist(s) | 1 | McRae Williams | United States | 93.80 |
| 2nd place, silver medalist(s) | 15 | Gus Kenworthy | United States | 91.80 |
| 3rd place, bronze medalist(s) | 7 | James Woods | Great Britain | 90.40 |
| 4 | 20 | Henrik Harlaut | Sweden | 87.80 |
| 5 | 9 | Antoine Adelisse | France | 86.80 |
| 6 | 2 | Andri Ragettli | Switzerland | 85.40 |
| 7 | 6 | Alex Bellemare | Canada | 83.60 |
| 8 | 8 | Russell Henshaw | Australia | 81.80 |
| 9 | 16 | Alexander Hall | United States | 81.20 |
| 10 | 10 | Finn Bilous | New Zealand | 80.40 |
| 11 | 14 | Alex Beaulieu-Marchand | Canada | 78.00 |
| 12 | 4 | Jesper Tjäder | Sweden | 71.60 |
| 13 | 5 | Teal Harle | Canada | 63.20 |
| 14 | 13 | Evan McEachran | Canada | 55.20 |
| 15 | 35 | Birk Ruud | Norway | 42.80 |
| 16 | 19 | Christian Nummedal | Norway | 39.80 |
