= FIS Freestyle World Ski Championships 2011 – Men's halfpipe =

The men's halfpipe competition of the FIS Freestyle World Ski Championships 2011 was held at Park City Mountain Resort, Park City, Utah, United States between February 4 and 5, 2011 (qualifications and finals).

33 athletes from 14 countries competed.

== Results ==
=== Qualification ===
The following are the results of the qualification.

Rank	Bib	Name	Country	Run 1	Run 2	Best Score	Note
1	19	Micheal Riddle	Canada	41.70	44.40	44.40	Q
2	20	Simon Dumont	United States	44.20	DNS	44.20	Q
3	12	Kevin Rolland	France	43.60	5.80	43.60	Q
4	9	David Wise	United States	42.50	39.70	42.50	Q
5	17	Tucker Perkins	United States	38.20	41.20	41.20	Q
6	22	Byron Wells	New Zealand	40.20	40.60	40.60	Q
7	15	Justin Dorey	Canada	11.00	40.30	40.30	Q
8	1	Xavier Bertoni	France	4.20	38.80	38.80	Q
9	25	Jossi Wells	New Zealand	38.40	38.00	38.40	Q
10	13	Noah Bowman	Canada	37.40	38.30	38.30	Q
11	2	Benoit Valentin	France	38.10	8.30	38.10	Q
12	3	Nils Lauper	Switzerland	23.30	37.60	37.60	Q
13	42	Torin Yater-Wallace	United States	33.90	14.80	33.90	
14	27	Matthew Margetts	Canada	12.30	33.30	33.30	
15	10	Jon Anders Lindstad	Norway	30.50	31.10	31.10	
16	18	Kai Mahler	Switzerland	31.00	18.70	31.00	
17	43	Thomas Dolplads	Norway	30.90	8.60	30.90	
18	26	James Machon	United Kingdom	30.00	29.60	30.00	
19	36	James Woods	United Kingdom	26.50	30.00	30.00	
20	35	Murray Buchan	United Kingdom	25.00	26.50	26.50	
21	31	Matti Raty	Finland	7.60	26.30	26.30	
22	16	Nicolas Elshout	Belgium	26.00	24.70	26.00	
23	28	Peter Crook	British Virgin Islands	25.50	12.70	25.50	
24	37	Matt Johnson	New Zealand	11.10	21.40	21.40	
25	29	Marc Christen	Liechtenstein	4.70	21.10	21.10	
26	30	Kentaro Tsuda	Japan	20.20	DNS	20.20	
27	24	Thomas Krief	France	15.30	15.60	15.60	
28	33	Isao Sonehara	Japan	13.20	13.00	13.20	
29	23	Kwang-Jin Kim	South Korea	8.10	9.70	9.70	
	7	Klaus Finne	Norway			DNS	
	14	Scott Jordan David	Andorra			DNS	
	21	Antti-Jussi Kemppainen	Finland			DNS	
	32	Raphael Beazley	New Zealand			DNS	

=== Final ===
Rank	Bib	Name	Country	Run 1	Run 2	Best	Notes
1st place, gold medalist(s)	19	Micheal Riddle	Canada	45.60	31.00	45.60	
2nd place, silver medalist(s)	12	Kevin Rolland	France	5.20	45.20	45.20	
3rd place, bronze medalist(s)	20	Simon Dumont	United States	43.20	14.90	43.20	
4	9	David Wise	United States	8.80	43.00	43.00	
5	22	Byron Wells	New Zealand	40.50	42.80	42.80	
6	1	Xavier Bertoni	France	38.50	41.20	41.20	
7	17	Tucker Perkins	United States	36.00	13.30	36.00	
8	2	Benoit Valentin	France	34.80	11.00	34.80	
9	25	Jossi Wells	New Zealand	10.90	34.60	34.60	
10	3	Nils Lauper	Switzerland	19.30	33.30	33.30	
11	13	Noah Bowman	Canada	32.10	4.30	32.10	
12	15	Justin Dorey	Canada	30.50	6.90	30.50	
