= Freestyle skiing at the 2012 Winter Youth Olympics – Boys' halfpipe =

Boys' halfpipe at the I Winter Youth Olympic Games
- Venue: Kühtai
- Dates: 14–15 January
- Competitors: 13 from 13 nations
- Winning points: 95.00

Medalists
| 1st place, gold medalist(s) | | Kai Mahler | Switzerland |
| 2nd place, silver medalist(s) | | Lauri Kivari | Finland |
| 3rd place, bronze medalist(s) | | Aaron Blunck | United States |

The boys' halfpipe event in freestyle skiing at the 2012 Winter Youth Olympics in Innsbruck, Austria, was held on 14 and 15 January at Kühtai. 13 athletes from 13 countries took part in this event.

== Results ==
=== Qualification ===
The qualification was held on 14 January at 13:15.

| Rank | Bib | Name | Country | Run 1 | Run 2 | Best | Notes |
|---|---|---|---|---|---|---|---|
| 1 | 9 | Beau-James Wells | New Zealand | 82.50 | 77.50 | 82.50 | Q |
| 2 | 10 | Kai Mahler | Switzerland | 14.25 | 76.50 | 76.50 | Q |
| 3 | 8 | Aaron Blunck | United States | 75.75 | 73.00 | 75.75 | Q |
| 4 | 1 | Lauri Kivari | Finland | 75.50 | 49.00 | 75.50 | Q |
| 5 | 7 | Aaron Mackay | Canada | 64.25 | 72.25 | 72.25 | Q |
| 6 | 13 | Johan Berg | Norway | 70.00 | 30.75 | 70.00 | Q |
| 7 | 3 | Cesar Fabre | France | 64.00 | 26.25 | 64.00 | Q |
| 8 | 6 | Tyler Harding | Great Britain | 59.25 | 63.50 | 63.50 | Q |
| 9 | 11 | Lucas Mangold | Germany | 26.00 | 61.50 | 61.50 | Q |
| 10 | 2 | Kim Kwang-jin | South Korea | 52.50 | 58.50 | 58.50 | Q |
| 11 | 5 | Daniel Walchhofer | Austria | 8.50 | 52.75 | 52.75 | Q |
| 12 | 12 | Thomas Waddell | Australia | 14.50 | 47.75 | 47.75 | Q |
| 13 | 4 | Ian Serra Carrillo | Andorra | 19.50 | 40.50 | 40.50 | |

=== Final ===
The final was held on 15 January at 13:40.

| Rank | Bib | Name | Country | Run 1 | Run 2 | Best |
|---|---|---|---|---|---|---|
| 1st place, gold medalist(s) | 10 | Kai Mahler | Switzerland | 95.00 | 67.25 | 95.00 |
| 2nd place, silver medalist(s) | 1 | Lauri Kivari | Finland | 48.75 | 90.00 | 90.00 |
| 3rd place, bronze medalist(s) | 8 | Aaron Blunck | United States | 64.25 | 87.50 | 87.50 |
| 4 | 9 | Beau-James Wells | New Zealand | 85.50 | 83.75 | 85.50 |
| 5 | 3 | Cesar Fabre | France | 74.75 | 79.25 | 79.25 |
| 6 | 7 | Aaron Mackay | Canada | 70.75 | 76.50 | 76.50 |
| 7 | 13 | Johan Berg | Norway | 66.75 | 71.75 | 71.75 |
| 8 | 2 | Kim Kwang-jin | South Korea | 67.75 | 61.75 | 67.75 |
| 9 | 5 | Daniel Walchhofer | Austria | 57.25 | 66.25 | 66.25 |
| 10 | 6 | Tyler Harding | Great Britain | 62.75 | 31.25 | 62.75 |
| 11 | 12 | Thomas Waddell | Australia | 48.25 | 14.25 | 48.25 |
| 12 | 11 | Lucas Mangold | Germany | 27.00 | 46.75 | 46.75 |
