= Freestyle skiing at the 2014 Winter Olympics – Men's halfpipe =

Men's halfpipe at the XXII Olympic Winter Games
- Venue: Rosa Khutor Extreme Park, Krasnaya Polyana, Russia
- Dates: 18 February 2014
- Competitors: 29 from 13 nations
- Winning score: 92.00

Medalists
1st place, gold medalist(s)		David Wise	United States
2nd place, silver medalist(s)		Mike Riddle	Canada
3rd place, bronze medalist(s)		Kevin Rolland	France

The men's halfpipe event in freestyle skiing at the 2014 Winter Olympics in Sochi, Russia took place 18 February 2014. In April 2011 freestyle halfpipe was added to the Olympic program, meaning the event will make its debut.

== Results ==
=== Qualification ===
The qualification was held at 17:45.

Rank	Bib	Name	Country	Run 1	Run 2	Best	Notes
1	1	Justin Dorey	Canada	91.60	6.40	91.60	Q
2	9	David Wise	United States	88.40	68.60	88.40	Q
3	21	Benoit Valentin	France	87.00	1.00	87.00	Q
4	4	Kevin Rolland	France	84.80	68.80	84.80	Q
5	35	Josiah Wells	New Zealand	83.00	49.40	83.00	Q
6	3	Mike Riddle	Canada	82.20	75.00	82.20	Q
7	6	Noah Bowman	Canada	80.60	77.80	80.60	Q
8	12	Lyndon Sheehan	New Zealand	78.20	80.00	80.00	Q
9	5	Antti-Jussi Kemppainen	Finland	79.40	60.40	79.40	Q
10	22	Beau-James Wells	New Zealand	76.80	66.40	76.80	Q
11	16	Thomas Krief	France	74.80	69.60	74.80	Q
12	2	Aaron Blunck	United States	69.40	72.00	72.00	Q
13	18	Jon Anders Lindstad	Norway	30.80	69.00	69.00	
14	8	Yannic Lerjen	Switzerland	67.60	29.60	67.60	
15	10	Matt Margetts	Canada	66.80	17.80	66.80	
16	23	Nils Lauper	Switzerland	65.00	58.00	65.00	
17	27	Murray Buchan	Great Britain	58.40	62.40	62.40	
18	31	Joel Gisler	Switzerland	60.80	2.60	60.80	
19	24	Marco Ladner	Austria	56.60	58.60	58.60	
20	28	Andreas Gohl	Austria	54.80	22.80	54.80	
21	20	Xavier Bertoni	France	53.40	51.60	53.40	
22	13	Kentaro Tsuda	Japan	53.00	23.40	53.00	
23	29	James Machon	Great Britain	37.40	52.20	52.20	
24	32	Pavel Nabokikh	Russia	13.40	50.40	50.40	
25	30	Kim Kwang-jin	South Korea	45.40	34.40	45.40	
26	34	Torin Yater-Wallace	United States	7.00	39.00	39.00	
27	26	Peter Crook	British Virgin Islands	24.20	25.20	25.20	
28	19	Lyman Currier	United States	4.20	12.60	12.60	
	33	Byron Wells	New Zealand	Did not start			

=== Final ===
The final was held at 21:30.

Rank	Bib	Name	Country	Run 1	Run 2	Best
1st place, gold medalist(s)	9	David Wise	United States	92.00	3.40	92.00
2nd place, silver medalist(s)	3	Mike Riddle	Canada	71.40	90.60	90.60
3rd place, bronze medalist(s)	4	Kevin Rolland	France	88.60	29.80	88.60
4	35	Josiah Wells	New Zealand	85.60	78.40	85.60
5	6	Noah Bowman	Canada	80.40	82.60	82.60
6	22	Beau-James Wells	New Zealand	62.00	80.00	80.00
7	2	Aaron Blunck	United States	68.60	79.40	79.40
8	5	Antti-Jussi Kemppainen	Finland	74.40	78.20	78.20
9	12	Lyndon Sheehan	New Zealand	55.20	72.60	72.60
10	21	Benoit Valentin	France	10.00	61.00	61.00
11	16	Thomas Krief	France	4.60	28.60	28.60
12	1	Justin Dorey	Canada	20.40	14.20	20.40
