= 2013 Universiade =

2013 Universiade may refer to:

- 2013 Summer Universiade, a summer sporting event held in Kazan
- 2013 Winter Universiade, a winter sporting event held in Trentino
