= Freestyle skiing at the 2015 Winter Universiade =

Freestyle skiing at the 2015 Winter Universiade was held at the Visera Slope and the Sulayr Snowpark in Sierra Nevada, Granada, from February 5 to February 13, 2015.

== Men's events ==
Event	Gold		Silver		Bronze	
Ski halfpipe	(United States) John Leonard	86.40	(South Korea) Kim Kwang-jin	71.60	(Russia) Pavel Chupa	70.00
Ski slopestyle	(Austria) Fabian Braitsch	81.83	(United States) Broby Leeds	78.00	(United States) Cody Potter	75.33
Moguls	(Kazakhstan) Pavel Kolmakov	72.45	(Kazakhstan) Dmitriy Reiherd	68.73	(Russia) Sergei Shimbuev	62.11
Ski cross	(Austria) Bernhard Graf	47.49	(Switzerland) Thimothe Henzi	48.02	(Russia) Igor Omelin	48.04

== Women's events ==
Event	Gold		Silver		Bronze	
Ski halfpipe	(France) Marine Tripier-Mondancin	77.80	(Russia) Elizavetta Chesnokova	73.60	(Germany) Jule Seifert	63.20
Ski slopestyle	(United States) Brooke Potter	73.16	(Slovakia) Zuzana Stromková	69.83	(Austria) Stefanie Mössler	58.00
Moguls	(Kazakhstan) Yuliya Galysheva	66.00	(Russia) Marika Pertakhiya	59.90	(South Korea) Seo Jee-won	51.86
Ski cross	(Czech Republic) Nikol Kučerová	50.08	(Russia) Lidia Pentukhova	50.73	(United States) Tania Prymak	50.78

== Medal table ==
Rank	Nation	Gold	Silver	Bronze	Total
1	United States	2	1	2	5
2	Kazakhstan	2	1	0	3
3	Austria	2	0	1	3
4	Czech Republic	1	0	0	1
4	France	1	0	0	1
6	Russia	0	3	3	6
7	South Korea	0	1	1	2
8	Slovakia	0	1	0	1
8	Switzerland	0	1	0	1
10	Germany	0	0	1	1
Totals (10 entries)		8	8	8	24
