= Gisler =

Gisler is a surname. Notable people with the surname include:

- Felix Gisler, Swiss para-alpine skier
- Joel Gisler (born 1994), Swiss freestyle skier
- Lisa Gisler (born 1994), Swiss curler
- Marcel Gisler (born 1960), Swiss film director and screenwriter
- Mike Gisler (born 1969), American football player
- Rolf Gisler (born 1953), Swiss sprinter
