= Freestyle skiing at the 2015 Winter Universiade – Women's ski slopestyle =

The women's ski slopestyle competition of the 2015 Winter Universiade was held at Sulayr Snowpark, Sierra Nevada, Spain on February 9, 2015.

== Results ==
=== Qualification ===
Rank	Bib	Name	Country	Run 1	Rank	Run 2	Rank	Best	Notes
1	33	Alexis Keeney	United States	76.66	1	27.16	12	76.66	Q
2	28	Zuzana Stromková	Slovakia	10	11	71.16	1	71.16	Q
3	34	Brooke Potter	United States	55.66	3	66.5	2	66.5	Q
4	21	Stefanie Mössler	Austria	54	4	66.16	3	66.16	Q
5	24	Jule Seifert	Germany	20	10	62.83	4	62.83	Q
6	35	Zuzanna Witych	Poland	62.5	2	54.83	5	62.5	Q
7	23	Julie Le Gall	France	43	8	50.83	6	50.83	
8	31	Enya Beutler	Switzerland	45.83	6	47.5	7	47.5	
9	22	Barbora Nováková	Czech Republic	47	5	44.83	8	47	
10	26	Yuliya Galysheva	Kazakhstan	44.5	7	41	9	44.5	
11	36	Anja Krivec	Slovenia	33.33	9	34.66	10	34.66	
12	25	Sofia Marchesini	Italy	7	12	31	11	31	
	30	Patricia Muñoz	Spain						DNS

=== Finals ===
Rank	Bib	Name	Country	Run 1	Rank	Run 2	Rank	Best	Notes
1st place, gold medalist(s)	34	Brooke Potter	United States	70.83	1	73.16	1	73.16	
2nd place, silver medalist(s)	28	Zuzana Stromková	Slovakia	61.66	2	69.83	2	69.83	
3rd place, bronze medalist(s)	21	Stefanie Mössler	Austria	16.16	4	58	3	58	
4	35	Zuzanna Witych	Poland	54.16	3	53.83	4	54.16	
5	33	Alexis Keeney	United States	9.83	5	DNS		9.83	
6	24	Jule Seifert	Germany	5	6	9	5	9	
