= Freestyle skiing at the 2015 Winter Universiade – Women's ski halfpipe =

The women's ski halfpipe competition of the 2015 Winter Universiade was held at Sulayr Snowpark, Sierra Nevada, Spain on February 10, 2015.

== Results ==
=== Qualification ===
Rank	Bib	Name	Country	Run 1	Rank	Run 2	Rank	Best	Notes
1	9	Marine Tripier-Mondancin	France	60	1	67.8	1	67.8	Q
2	11	Jule Seifert	Germany	54.6	2	59.2	2	59.2	Q
3	1	Elizavetta Chesnokova	Russia	52	4	56.8	3	56.8	Q
4	4	Enya Beutler	Switzerland	52.4	3	48.4	4	52.4	Q
5	12	Brooke Potter	United States	42.4	5	41.6	5	42.4	Q
6	10	Sofia Marchesini	Italy	9.6	7	37	6	37	Q
7	7	Stefanie Mössler	Austria	36.8	6	DNS		36.8	
	2	Zuzanna Witych	Poland						DNS
	6	Elena Irene Jaimez	Spain						DNS
	8	Patricia Muñoz	Spain						DNS
	13	Alexis Keeney	United States						DNS

=== Final ===
Rank	Bib	Name	Country	Run 1	Rank	Run 2	Rank	Best	Notes
1st place, gold medalist(s)	9	Marine Tripier-Mondancin	France	75.8	1	77.8	1	77.8	
2nd place, silver medalist(s)	1	Elizavetta Chesnokova	Russia	73.6	2	73	2	73.6	
3rd place, bronze medalist(s)	11	Jule Seifert	Germany	63.2	3	62.4	3	63.2	
4	4	Enya Beutler	Switzerland	56.6	4	57	4	57	
5	12	Brooke Potter	United States	50	5	51.4	5	51.4	
6	10	Sofia Marchesini	Italy	41.6	6	41.4	6	41.6	
