= Freestyle skiing at the 2015 Winter Universiade – Men's ski halfpipe =

The men's ski halfpipe competition of the 2015 Winter Universiade was held at Sulayr Snowpark, Sierra Nevada, Spain on February 10, 2015.

== Results ==
=== Qualification ===
| Rank | Bib | Name | Country | Run 1 | Rank | Run 2 | Rank | Best | Notes |
|---|---|---|---|---|---|---|---|---|---|
| 1 | 3 | Pavel Chupa | Russia | 81 | 1 | 81.2 | 1 | 81.2 | Q |
| 2 | 2 | Kim Kwang-jin | South Korea | 74.8 | 2 | 10.4 | 8 | 74.8 | Q |
| 3 | 13 | John Leonard | United States | 69.2 | 4 | 73.8 | 2 | 73.8 | Q |
| 4 | 4 | Petr Kordyuk | Russia | 71.4 | 3 | 73.2 | 3 | 73.2 | Q |
| 5 | 12 | Broby Leeds | United States | 65.6 | 5 | 71.8 | 4 | 71.8 | Q |
| 6 | 9 | Dominic Hasibeder | Austria | 50.6 | 6 | 53.6 | 5 | 53.6 | Q |
| 7 | 6 | Anton Komarov | Russia | 12.4 | 8 | 44.4 | 6 | 44.4 | |
| 8 | 11 | Jorge Montoya | Spain | 17.4 | 7 | 39.2 | 7 | 39.2 | |
| | 1 | Nicolas Bijasson | France | | | | | | DNS |
| | 7 | Szczepan Karpiel | Poland | | | | | | DNS |
| | 8 | Alexander Benz | Switzerland | | | | | | DNS |
| | 14 | Jeremy Brown | United States | | | | | | DNS |

=== Final ===
| Rank | Bib | Name | Country | Run 1 | Rank | Run 2 | Rank | Best | Notes |
|---|---|---|---|---|---|---|---|---|---|
| 1st place, gold medalist(s) | 13 | John Leonard | United States | 81.6 | 1 | 86.4 | 1 | 86.4 | |
| 2nd place, silver medalist(s) | 2 | Kim Kwang-jin | South Korea | 71.6 | 2 | 62.6 | 3 | 71.6 | |
| 3rd place, bronze medalist(s) | 3 | Pavel Chupa | Russia | 70 | 3 | 67.8 | 2 | 70 | |
| 4 | 4 | Petr Kordyuk | Russia | 64 | 4 | 36 | 5 | 64 | |
| 5 | 12 | Broby Leeds | United States | 27.2 | 5 | 62.2 | 4 | 62.2 | |
| 6 | 9 | Dominic Hasibeder | Austria | 12.2 | 6 | 27.6 | 6 | 27.6 | |
