= Jon Anders Lindstad =

Norwegian freestyle skier

Personal information
- Nationality: Norwegian
- Born: 4 July 1994 (age 30)

Sport
- Sport: Freestyle skiing

Jon Anders Lindstad (born 4 July 1994) is a Norwegian freestyle skier. He competed in halfpipe at the FIS World Championships in 2011 and 2013. He competed at the 2014 Winter Olympics in Sochi, in halfpipe.
