= Freestyle skiing at the 2011 Winter Universiade =

From January 28 to February 5, 2011 The Freestyle Skiing

Freestyle skiing at the 2011 Winter Universiade will be held at the Palandöken Mountain in Erzurum, Turkey. The four events are scheduled for January 28 - February 5, 2011.

== Men's events ==
Event	Gold		Silver		Bronze	
Moguls	Aleksandr Kerner; Russia	23.05	Evgeny Mikhailov; Russia	22.15	Denis Moisseyev; Kazakhstan	21.57
Ski cross	Manuel Eicher; Switzerland		Georgii Kornilov; Russia		Olivier Fabre; France	

== Women's events ==
Event	Gold		Silver		Bronze	
Moguls	Darya Rybalova; Kazakhstan	21.48	Irina Pisarevskaya; Russia	20.62	Alena Zueva; Russia	19.47
Ski cross	Christina Manhard; Germany		Julia Manhard; Germany		Darya Vasilyeva; Russia	

== Medals table ==
Rank	Nation	Gold	Silver	Bronze	Total
1	Russia	1	3	2	6
2	Germany	1	1	0	2
3	Kazakhstan	1	0	1	2
4	Switzerland	1	0	0	1
5	France	0	0	1	1
Totals (5 entries)		4	4	4	12
