= Tryokhgorny =

Closed town in Chelyabinsk Oblast, Russia

Tryokhgorny Трёхгорный
- Town
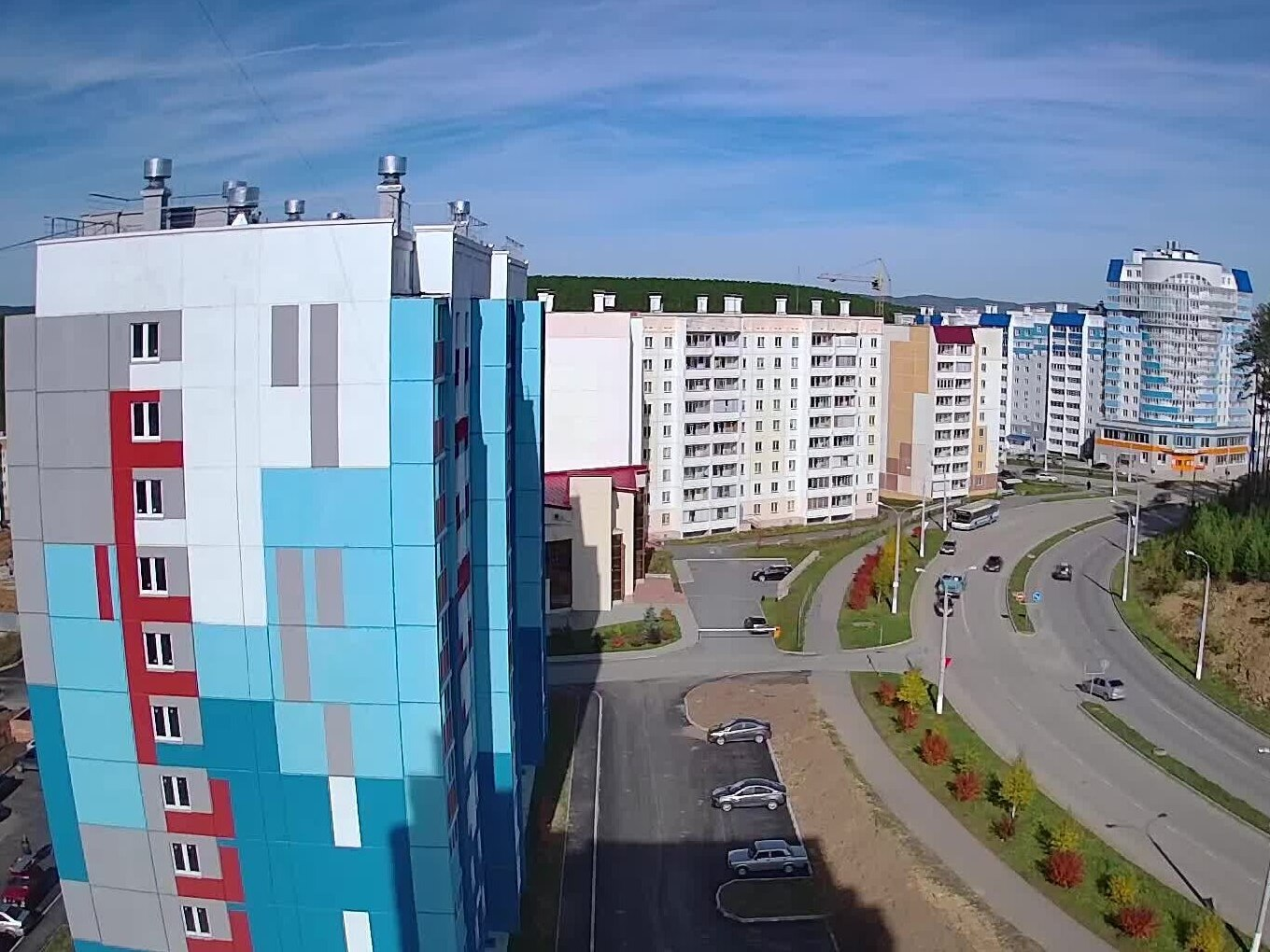
- View of Stroiteley Street (2019)

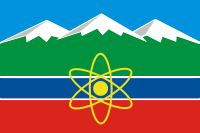
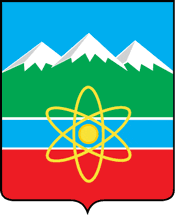
- Flag Coat of arms
- Interactive map of Tryokhgorny
- Location of Tryokhgorny Tryokhgorny (Chelyabinsk Oblast)
- Coordinates: 54°48′N 58°27′E
- Country: Russia
- Federal subject: Chelyabinsk Oblast
- Founded: January 24, 1952
- Elevation: 431 m (1,414 ft)

Population (2010 Census)
  - Total: 33,670
  - Estimate (2023): 32,478 (−3.5%)

Administrative status
  - Subordinated to: Town of Tryokhgorny
  - Capital of: Town of Tryokhgorny

Municipal status
  - Urban okrug: Tryokhgorny Urban Okrug
  - Capital of: Tryokhgorny Urban Okrug
- Time zone: UTC+5 (MSK+2)
- Postal code: 456080–456082
- OKTMO ID: 75707000001
- Website: admintrg.ru

Tryokhgorny (Russian: Трёхго́рный, lit. (a town of) three mountains) is a closed town in Chelyabinsk Oblast, Russia, located in the western part of the oblast 200 kilometers (120 mi) from Chelyabinsk. Population: 33,670 (2010 census); 34,290 (2002 census).

== History ==
On January 24, 1952, the Council of Ministers of the USSR issued decree No. 342—135сс/оп to build Plant #933 (Instrument Factory) for the production of atomic bombs. Konstantin Volodin headed the new plant. On April 9, 1952, first construction workers arrived to the area.

== Administrative and municipal status ==
Within the framework of administrative divisions, it is incorporated as the Town of Tryokhgorny—an administrative unit with the status equal to that of the districts. As a municipal division, the Town of Tryokhgorny is incorporated as Tryokhgorny Urban Okrug.

== Closed status ==
The town is closed because a plant producing nuclear weapons is located there.
