= Freestyle skiing at the 2013 Winter Universiade =

Freestyle skiing at the 2013 Winter Universiade was held in Monte Bondone from December 15 to December 18, 2013.

== Men's events ==
Event	Gold		Silver		Bronze	
Ski cross	Mateusz Habrat; Poland		Igor Omelin; Russia		Jiří Čech; Czech Republic	
Slopestyle	Kalle Leinonen; Finland	87.60	Szczepan Karpiel; Poland	87.00	Janne van Enckevort; Netherlands	84.20

== Women's events ==
Event	Gold		Silver		Bronze	
Ski cross	Daria Nikolaeva; Russia		Violetta Kovalskaya; Russia		Viktoria Struk; Russia	
Slopestyle	Alexis Keeney; United States	129.8	Fabienne Werder; Switzerland	119.4	Katie Souza; United States	114.0

== Medal table ==
Rank	Nation	Gold	Silver	Bronze	Total
1	Russia	1	2	1	4
2	Poland	1	1	0	2
3	United States	1	0	1	2
4	Finland	1	0	0	1
5	Switzerland	0	1	0	1
6	Czech Republic	0	0	1	1
6	Netherlands	0	0	1	1
Totals (7 entries)		4	4	4	12
