= Yan Ting =

Chinese freestyle skier

Personal information
- Born: 3 May 1997 (age 27)

Sport
- Country: China
- Sport: Freestyle skiing
- Event: Aerials

Yan Ting
- Simplified Chinese: 颜婷
- Traditional Chinese: 顏婷
Transcriptions
Standard Mandarin
- Hanyu Pinyin: Yán Tíng
- IPA: [jɛ̌n tʰǐŋ]

Yan Ting (Chinese: 颜婷; pinyin: Yán Tíng; Mandarin pronunciation: [jɛ̌n tʰǐŋ]; born 3 May 1997) is a Chinese freestyle skier who competes internationally.

She participated at the 2018 Winter Olympics.
