= Lyndon Sheehan =

New Zealand freestyle skier

Personal information
- Nationality: New Zealand
- Born: 16 July 1988 (age 37)

Sport
- Sport: Freestyle skiing

Lyndon Sheehan (born 16 July 1988) is a New Zealand freestyle skier. He competed at the FIS Freestyle World Ski Championships 2013 in Voss, and at the 2014 Winter Olympics in Sochi, in men's halfpipe.
