= Nikolaj Najdenov =

Bulgarian vert skater

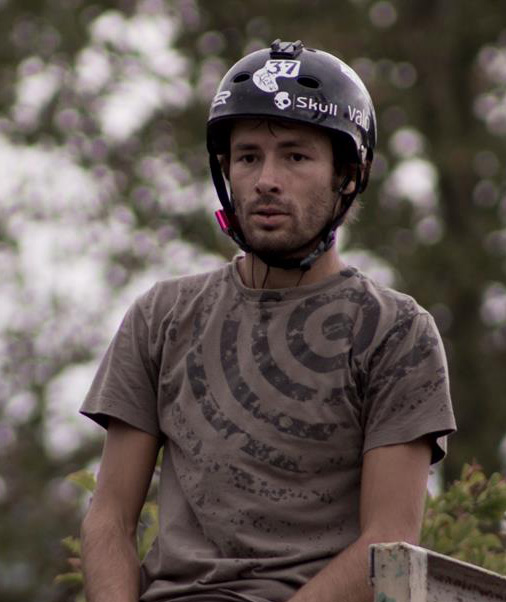

Personal information
- Nationality: Bulgarian
- Born: September 15, 1984 (age 41) Sofia, Bulgaria
- Height: 6 ft 0 in (183 cm)
- Weight: 140 lb (64 kg)

Sport
- Sport: Vert skating
Medal record
Competitions
Representing Bulgaria
Gold medal – first place	2006 Montana, Bulgaria	Vert
Gold medal – first place	2004 Mtn Dew Vert Comp	Vert
Gold medal – first place	2002 National Inline Vert	Vert

Nikolaj Najdenov (Bulgarian: Николай Найденов) is a Bulgarian professional inline vert skater. Najdenov started skating when he was twelve years old in 1996 and turned professional in 2004. Najdenov has won many competitions in his vert skating career.

Best Tricks McTwist 1080

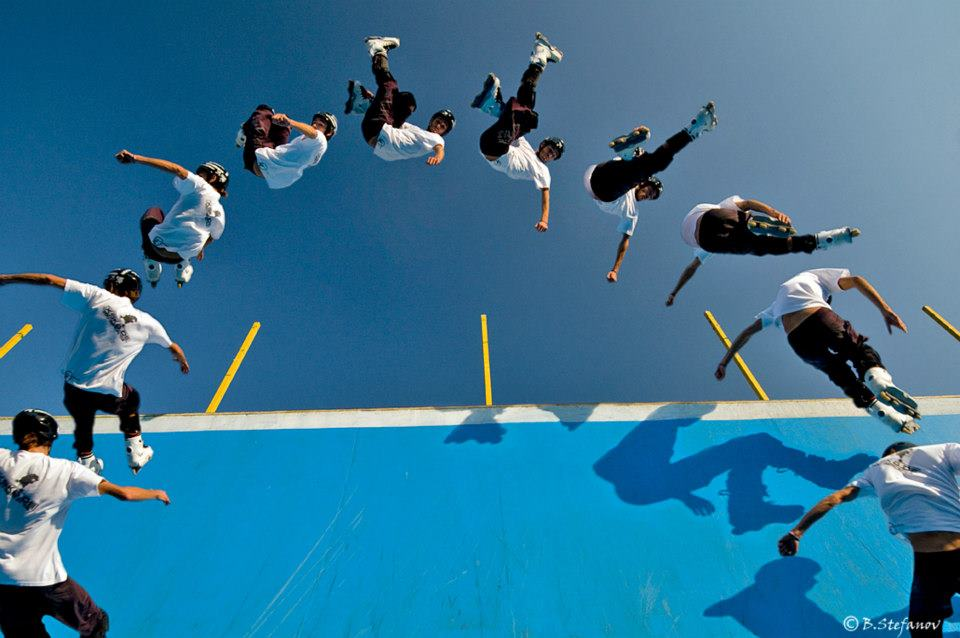
Najdenov doing a Flatspin 360 while Vert Skating

== Vert Competitions ==
- 2014 NL Contest, Strasbourg, France - Vert: 1st
- 2014 Montana Spring Sessions, Montana, Bulgaria - Vert: 1st
- 2014 Kia World Extreme Games, Shanghai, China - Vert: 3rd
- 2013 Kia World Extreme Games, Shanghai, China - Vert: 4th
- 2011 Kia X Games Asia, Shanghai, China - Vert: 6th
- 2006 World Amateur Championships, Dallas, USA - Vert: 2nd
- 2006 European Inline Vert Championship, Montana, Bulgaria - Vert: 1st
- 2006 Vivatel Challenge - Big Air Contest, Montana, Bulgaria - Vert: 1st
- 2006 Open Inline Vert Contest, Montana, Bulgaria - Vert: 3rd
- 2006 Rennes sur Roulettes, Rennes, France - Vert: 4th
- 2005 SAG European Challenge, Berlin, Germany - Vert: 6th
- 2005 World Amateur Championships, Manchester, UK - Vert: 7th
- 2005 Inline Vert Competition, Nova Gorica, Slovenia - Vert: 3rd
- 2004 World Amateur Championships, Los Angeles, CA - Vert: 9th
- 2004 Core-Tour, Huntington Beach, CA: Competed in Round 3
- 2004 Core-Tour, New York City, NY - Vert: Competed in Round 2
- 2004 Mountain Dew Vert Competition, Sofia, Bulgaria - Vert: 1st
- 2003 Bulgarian National Inline Vert Championships: 1st
- 2002 Bulgarian National Inline Vert Championships: 1st
