= Teal Harle =

Canadian freestyle skier (born 1996)

Personal information
- Born: 5 October 1996 (age 29) Campbell River, British Columbia

Sport
- Country: Canada
- Sport: Freestyle skiing
- Event: Slopestyle
Medal record
Men's freestyle skiing
Representing Canada
Winter X Games
Silver medal – second place	2023 Aspen	Big air
Bronze medal – third place	2022 Aspen	Big air

Teal Harle (born 5 October 1996 in Campbell River) is a Canadian freestyle skier who competes internationally.

He represented Canada in slopestyle at the 2018 Winter Olympics in PyeongChang, where he qualified for the final, along with two fellow Canadian skiers, and finished fifth.

On January 24, 2022, Harle was named to Canada's 2022 Olympic team.
