= Joel Gisler =

Swiss freestyle skier

Personal information
- Born: 25 February 1994 (age 32) Bürglen, Switzerland

Sport
- Sport: Skiing

Joel Gisler (born 25 February 1994 in Bürglen) is a Swiss freestyle skier, specializing in halfpipe.

Gisler competed at the 2014 Winter Olympics for Switzerland. He placed 18th in the qualifying round in the halfpipe, failing to advance.

Gisler made his World Cup debut in March 2011. As of April 2014, his best World Cup finish is 16th, at Sierra Nevada in 2012–13. His best World Cup overall finish in halfpipe is 34th, in 2010–11.

Competing in the 2018 Winter Olympics, again for Switzerland, he experienced a video recorded crash on par with that of Vinko Bogataj.
