= Lauri Kivari =

Finnish freestyle skier

Personal information
- Nationality: Finnish
- Born: 23 March 1996 (age 30) Helsinki

Sport
- Sport: Freestyle skiing

Lauri Kivari (born 23 March 1996) is a Finnish freestyle skier. He was born in Helsinki. He competed at the 2014 Winter Olympics in Sochi, in slopestyle.
