= Zhang Xin (skier) =

Chinese freestyle skier (born 1985)

Personal information
- Born: 4 August 1985 (age 40) Anshan, China

Sport
- Sport: Skiing

World Cup career
- Indiv. podiums: 15
- Indiv. wins: 3
Medal record
Representing China
Olympic Games
Silver medal – second place	2018 Pyeongchang	Aerials

Zhang Xin
- Simplified Chinese: 张鑫
- Traditional Chinese: 張鑫
Transcriptions
Standard Mandarin
- Hanyu Pinyin: Zhāng Xīn
- IPA: [ʈʂáŋ ɕín]

Zhang Xin (born 4 August 1985) is a Chinese freestyle skier, specializing in aerials.

== Career ==
Zhang competed at the 2014 Winter Olympics for China. She placed 17th in the first qualifying round in the aerials, failing to advance. She subsequently placed 7th in the second qualification round, again not advancing.

As of September 2015, her best showing at the World Championships is 12th, in the 2013 aerials.

Zhang made her World Cup debut in February 2004. As of September 2015, she has three World Cup wins, with the first coming at Beida Lake in 2010–11. Her best World Cup overall finish in aerials is 2nd, in 2013–14.

== World Cup podiums ==
Date	Location	Rank	Event
18 December 2005	Changchun	2nd place, silver medalist(s)	Aerials
9 December 2006	Beida Lake	2nd place, silver medalist(s)	Aerials
1 March 2008	Moscow	3rd place, bronze medalist(s)	Aerials
20 December 2009	Changchun	3rd place, bronze medalist(s)	Aerials
22 January 2010	Lake Placid	3rd place, bronze medalist(s)	Aerials
17 December 2010	Beida Lake	1st place, gold medalist(s)	Aerials
12 February 2011	Moscow	3rd place, bronze medalist(s)	Aerials
11 February 2012	Beida Lake	1st place, gold medalist(s)	Aerials
25 February 2012	Minsk	3rd place, bronze medalist(s)	Aerials
17 March 2012	Myrkdalen-Voss	3rd place, bronze medalist(s)	Aerials
1 February 2013	Deer Valley	3rd place, bronze medalist(s)	Aerials
12 December 2013	Beijing	1st place, gold medalist(s)	Aerials
10 January 2014	Deer Valley	2nd place, silver medalist(s)	Aerials
14 January 2014	Val St. Come	3rd place, bronze medalist(s)	Aerials
18 January 2014	Lake Placid	3rd place, bronze medalist(s)	Aerials
