= Jossi Wells =

New Zealand freestyle skier (born 1990)

Medal record

Men's freestyle skiing

Representing New Zealand

Winter Dew Tour
Bronze medal – third place	2008–2009 Dew Cup	Slopestyle
Bronze medal – third place	2009 Northstart-at-Tahoe	Slopestyle
Silver medal – second place	2009 Mt. Snow	Slopestyle
Silver medal – second place	2008 Breckenridge	Slopestyle

Winter X Games
Gold medal – first place	2016 Aspen	Slopestyle
Silver medal – second place	2013 Tignes	Slopestyle
Bronze medal – third place	2012 Aspen	Big Air
Silver medal – second place	2010 Aspen	Superpipe
Silver medal – second place	2008 Aspen	Slopestyle

Josiah "Jossi" Wells (born 18 May 1990) is a freestyle skier who represented New Zealand at the 2014 Winter Olympics in Sochi, Russia.

Born in Wānaka, New Zealand, he won a bronze medal in the Big Air competition at Winter X Games XVI.

Wells's brothers Byron, Beau-James, and Jackson are also competitive freestyle skiers.

Awards
Preceded by Emma Twigg	Halberg Awards – Emerging Talent Award; 2008	Succeeded by Sam Webster
