= Byron Wells =

New Zealand freestyle skier

Byron Wells (born 3 April 1992) is a New Zealand freestyle skier. He competed at the FIS Freestyle World Ski Championships 2011 in Utah, in halfpipe and slopestyle. He qualified for the 2014 Winter Olympics in Sochi, in men's halfpipe, but did not start. His brother is also an international freestyle skier, Beau-James Wells.
