= Andreas Gohl =

Austrian freestyle skier

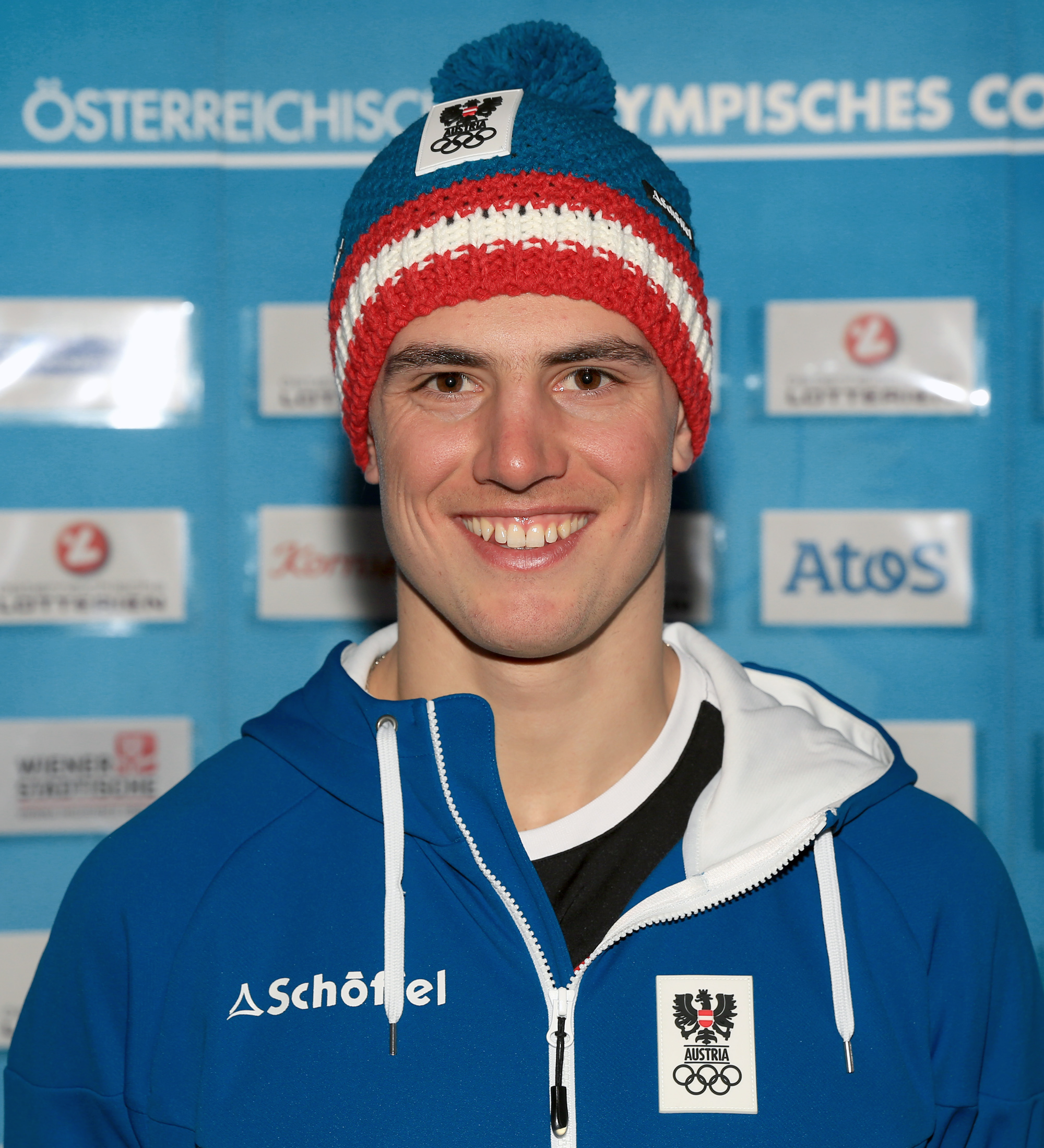

Personal information
- Born: 29 January 1994 (age 32) Bludenz, Austria

Sport
- Sport: Skiing

Andreas Gohl (born 29 January 1994 in Bludenz) is an Austrian freestyle skier, specializing in halfpipe.

Gohl competed at the 2014 Winter Olympics for Austria. He placed 20th in the qualifying round in the halfpipe, failing to advance.

Gohl made his World Cup debut in January 2013. As of April 2014, his best World Cup finish is 10th, at Calgary in 2013–14. His best World Cup overall finish in halfpipe is 29th, in 2013–14.
