= Elizaveta Chesnokova =

Russian freestyle skier

Personal information
- Born: 10 April 1996 (age 30) Tryokhgorny, Russia

Sport
- Sport: Skiing

Elizaveta Chesnokova (born 10 April 1996 in Tryokhgorny) is a Russian freestyle skier, specializing in halfpipe and slopestyle.

Chesnokova, a niece of Russian sociologist [[]], competed at the 2014 Winter Olympics for Russia. She placed 19th in the qualifying round in the halfpipe, failing to advance.

As of September 2015, her best showing at the World Championships is 12th, in the 2015 halfpipe.

Chesnokova made her World Cup debut in January 2013. As of September 2015, her best World Cup finish is 11th, in at Calgary in 2013–14. Her best World Cup overall finish in halfpipe is 19th, in 2013–14.
