= Walter Wood (freestyle skier) =

American freestyle skier

Walter Wood (born March 5, 1992) is an American freestyle skier from Evergreen, Colorado. Wood became a recognizable figure in the sport of skiing at a young age. His influence in skiing alongside others helped support the development and eventual adoption of halfpipe skiing to the Olympic Games.

== Early and personal life ==
Born in Evergreen, Colorado Wood quickly progressed in the sport of skiing. Early in his career as a professional athlete, Wood set a record for landing the first 1620 rotation in halfpipe competition. Wood has been a team member of the Flying Ace Allstars for over 10 years, a live entertainment ski & snowboard show located at the Utah Olympic Park in Park City, Utah. In 2014, Wood enrolled at The University of Utah and accepted into the David Eccles School of Business where he graduated with a Bachelor in Science Business degree with an emphasis in creative advertising.

== Athletic career ==
In 2008, Wood competed in his first World Cup at the age of 15 When he was 17 he was awarded the USSA Andy Mill award for sportsmanship and named to the Colorado All Star Team competed in his first professional competition at the age of 15 and his first of 4 X Games appearances at the age of 16 years old, in the discipline of Halfpipe skiing. Wood became World Champion in 2010, winning the TELUS World Ski & Snowboard Festival in the ski halfpipe event at Whistler, British Columbia. Wood has over 40 world cup starts and competed in Dew Tour competitions from 2008 until 2015 including 2 World Championship teams representing the United States. Wood placed 5th in the 2015 Krieschberg, Austria FIS World Championships. Lululemon athletic clothing brand selected Wood to endorse as one of the first male international snowsports athletes to represent the company. Wood was one of the top Olympic hopefuls for the 2014 Sochi Olympic Games.

== Commercial projects ==
- Ski Movie Segment: Turbulent Flow by Chaoz Productions
- University of Utah Pac-12 Commercial Spot
- Cellucor "Rise & Grind" Commercial Spot
- Utah Olympic Oval Commercial Spot

== Results ==
- 2015 5th FIS World Championships halfpipe, Kreischberg Austria
- 2014 6th SFR Tour, Tignes France
- 2014 4th Aspen Open, Aspen CO
- 2014 7th US Grand Prix, Park City UT
- 2013 15th X Games, Tignes France
- 2013 3rd SFR Tour, Tignes France
- 2013 3rd Aspen Open, Aspen CO
- 2013 4th North Face Open, Whistler BC
- 2013 2nd Junior World Championships, Cadrona NZ
- 2012 6th New Zealand Winter Games, Cadrona NZ
- 2011 9th Dew Tour, Breckenridge CO
- 2011 1st AFP World Rankings
- 2010 1st World Skiing Invitational, Whistler BC
- 2010 2nd Junior World Championships, New Zealand
- 2010 2nd U.S. National Championships, Squaw Valley California
- 2010 9th European X-Games, Tignes France
- 2010 2nd Aspen Open, Colorado
- 2009 2nd U.S. National Championships, Squaw Valley California
- 2009 3rd World Cup Park City, Utah
- 2009 9th World Championships, Inawashiro Japan
- 2009 14th X-Games, Aspen Colorado
- 2008 3rd New Zealand Open, Cadrona New Zealand
- 2008 8th World Cup Japan, Inawashiro Japan
- 2008 2nd U.S. National Championships, Squaw Valley California

== See also ==
- 2008–09 FIS Freestyle Skiing World Cup
