= Freestyle skiing at the 2017 Winter Universiade =

Freestyle skiing at the XXVIII Winter Universiade
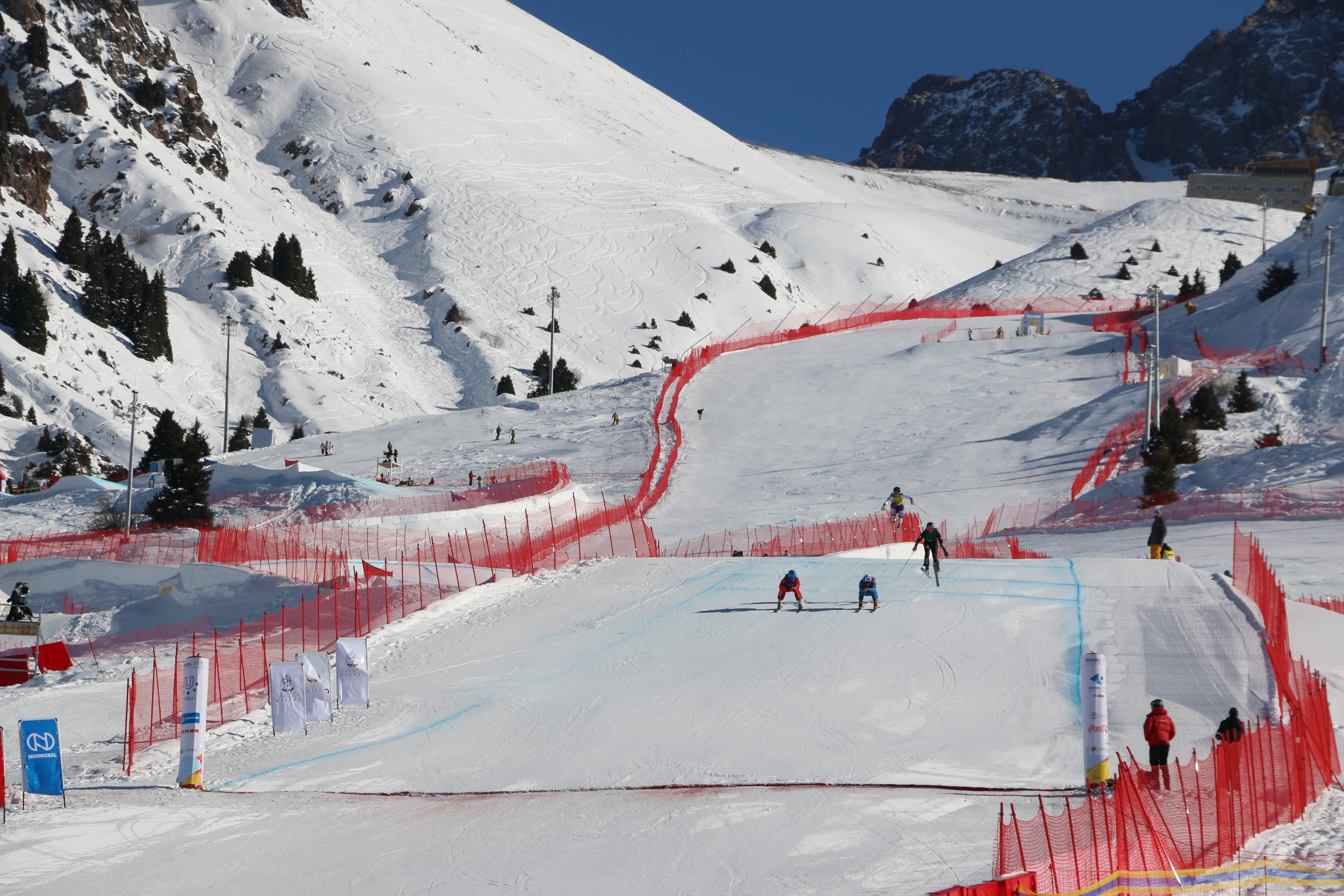
- Ski cross
- Venue: Shymbulak
- Dates: 30 January – 7 February

Freestyle skiing at the 2017 Winter Universiade was held at the Shymbulak Ski Resort in Almaty from 30 January to 7 February 2017.

== Men's events ==
| Event | Gold | | Silver | | Bronze | |
|---|---|---|---|---|---|---|
| Aerials | (China) Li Zhonglin | 97.99 | (Belarus) Artslom Bashlakou | 90.94 | (China) Guo Ziming | 86.31 |
| Moguls | (Kazakhstan) Dmitriy Reiherd | 79.94 | (Russia) Sergei Shimbuev | 79.11 | (Kazakhstan) Pavel Kolmakov | 76.95 |
| Dual Moguls | (Kazakhstan) Dmitriy Reiherd | | (Russia) Sergei Shimbuev | | (Kazakhstan) Pavel Kolmakov | |
| Ski cross | (Czech Republic) Jiří Čech | | (Russia) Kirill Merenkov | | (Switzerland) Enrico Fromm | |

== Women's events ==
| Event | Gold | | Silver | | Bronze | |
|---|---|---|---|---|---|---|
| Aerials | (China) Zhu Yingying | 64.09 | (Kazakhstan) Zhibek Arapbayeva | 60.84 | (Kazakhstan) Zhanbota Aldabergenova | 60.48 |
| Moguls | (Kazakhstan) Yuliya Galysheva | 73.80 | (Russia) Anastasiia Pervushina | 62.13 | (Austria) Katharina Ramsauer | 52.05 |
| Dual Moguls | (Kazakhstan) Yuliya Galysheva | | (Russia) Elizaveta Bezgodova | | (Austria) Katharina Ramsauer | |
| Ski cross | (Russia) Anna Antonova | | (Russia) Mayya Averyanova | | (Russia) Ekaterina Maltseva | |

== Mixed events ==
| Event | Gold | | Silver | | Bronze | |
|---|---|---|---|---|---|---|
| Team Aerials | Kazakhstan II; Zhanbota Aldabergenova; Baglan Inkarbek | 167.05 | China I Xu Nuo; Shi Haitao | 113.02 | China II; Zhu Yingying; Guo Ziming | 87.77 |

== Medal table ==
* Host nation (Kazakhstan)

| Rank | Nation | Gold | Silver | Bronze | Total |
|---|---|---|---|---|---|
| 1 | Kazakhstan* | 5 | 1 | 3 | 9 |
| 2 | China | 2 | 1 | 2 | 5 |
| 3 | Russia | 1 | 6 | 1 | 8 |
| 4 | Czech Republic | 1 | 0 | 0 | 1 |
| 5 | Belarus | 0 | 1 | 0 | 1 |
| 6 | Austria | 0 | 0 | 2 | 2 |
| 7 | Switzerland | 0 | 0 | 1 | 1 |
| Totals (7 entries) | | 9 | 9 | 9 | 27 |
