= 2013 Winter Universiade =

Multi-sport event in Trentino, Italy

XXVI Winter Universiade XXVI Universiade invernale
- The official logo for the 2013 Winter Universiade
- Host city: Trentino, Italy
- Nations: 51
- Athletes: 1,725
- Events: 79 in 12 sports
- Opening: December 11, 2013
- Closing: December 21, 2013
- Opened by: President Ugo Rossi
- Torch lighter: Franco Nones
- Main venue: Trento Dome Square; Stadio del Ghiaccio de Gianmario Scola
- Website: universiadetrentino.org (archived)

Winter

Summer

The 2013 Winter Universiade, the XXVI Winter Universiade, was a winter multi-sport event which took place in Trentino, Italy between 11 and 21 December 2013.

This was the first time that a Winter Universiade happened after the Summer Universiade in same the year and in the end of the year and missing two months for the 2014 Winter Olympic Games. Originally, it was planned to take place in Maribor, Slovenia in late January and early February, but the Government of Slovenia overturned its decision to partially fund the project due to financial problems in February 2012. In March 2012, the International University Sports Federation decided that it would organise the Universiade elsewhere. FISU officially announced that the Trentino region of Italy would host the event.

The motto of the event was "Inspired by U". The torch, made by the Department of Industrial Engineering of the University of Trento, recalled a flower of gentian with five petals in the shape of a ski, with colors that recall the Olympic colors and the five stars of the universes. It was officially lit by Pope Francis in Rome on 6 November 2013.

== Bid selection ==
The city of Maribor (Slovenia) was the only one bidding city for the event. On May 31, 2008, Maribor won the right to host the event, but later withdrew.

After the FISU revoked the rights of Maribor, they began secret negotiations with the region of Trentino that, for financial reasons and a lack of sponsors, had withdrawn their bid to host the 2017 Winter Universiade. Two weeks after the resignation of Maribor, negotiations were completed and Trentino was formalized as the new host region. The factor that gave a boom for the negotiations was that their infrastructure was ready and in use. As they, did not need improvement works. Later, the event was a scope to the winning bid for Milan and Cortina D'Ampezzo to host the 2026 Winter Olympics and the region will act as satellite venue hub.

== Venues ==
The following venues have been named to host the various events at the 2013 Winter Universiade:

=== Baselga di Piné ===
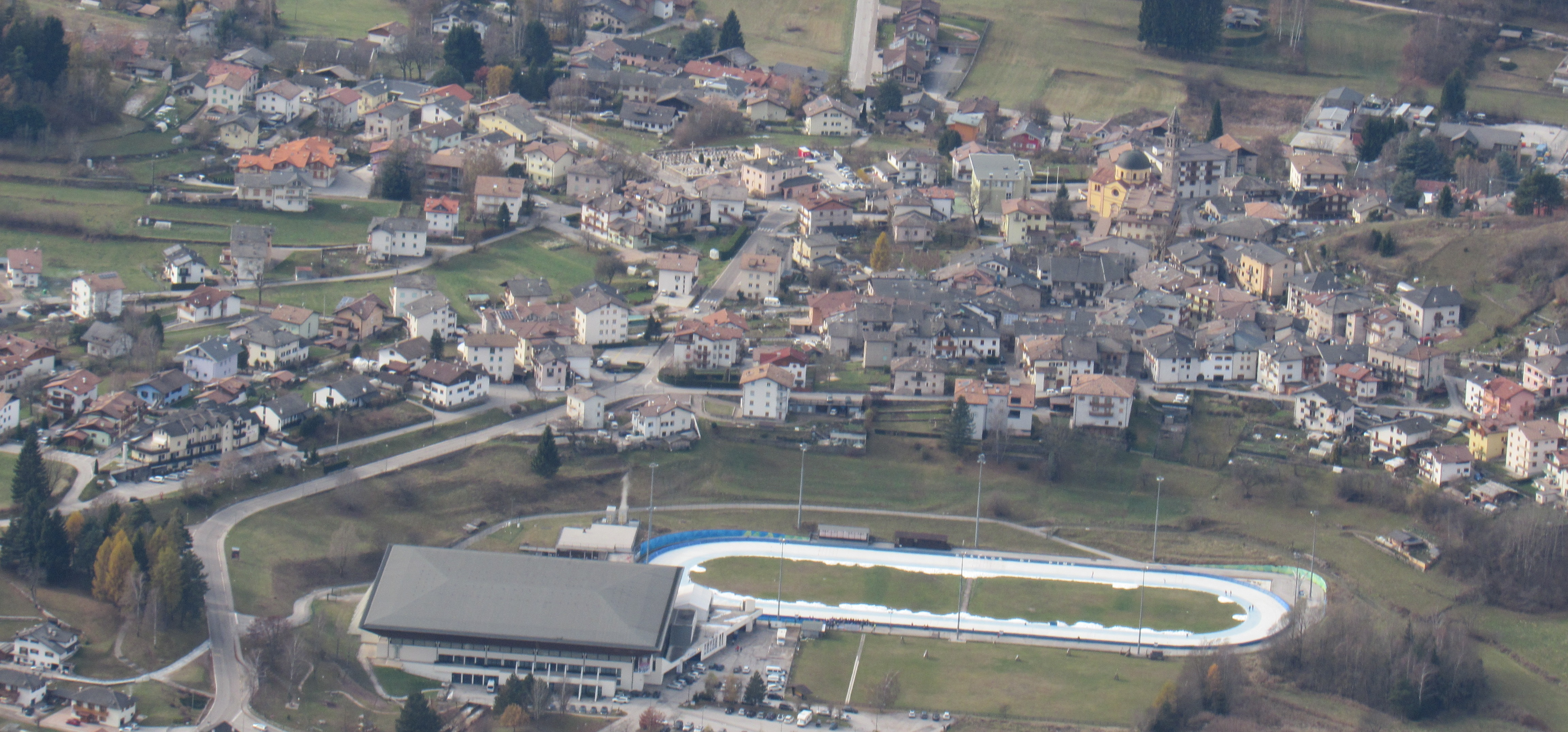
Ice Rink Piné

Venue	Sports	Capacity	Ref.
Stadio del Ghiaccio	Speed skating, curling	5,000	

=== Monte Bondone ===
Venue	Sports	Capacity	Ref.
Pista Canalon, Monte Bondone	Snowboarding (parallel giant slalom)	not	
Pista Lavanman, Monte Bondone	Snowboarding (snowboard cross), freestyle skiing (ski cross)	not	
Snowpark di Monte Bondone	Snowboarding, freestyle skiing	not	

=== Pergine Valsugana ===
Venue	Sports	Capacity	Ref.
Pergine Valsugana Ghiaccio Hall	Ice hockey (women's)	1,802	

=== Trento ===
Venue	Sports	Capacity	Ref.
Trento Ghiaccio Arena	Figure skating, short track	2,160	
Piazza Duomo, Trento	Opening ceremony, medal plaza	not	

=== Val di Fassa ===
Venue	Sports	Capacity	Ref.
Alloch Piste, Pozza di Fassa	Alpine skiing (slalom/giant slalom)	not	
Nuova Cima Uomo, Passo San Pellegrino - Moena	Alpine skiing (super-G/downhill)	not	
Stadio del Ghiaccio "Gianmario Scola" (Ice stadium), Canazei	Ice hockey (men's), closing ceremonies	1,500	
Piaz de Sotegrava - Moena	Medal plaza	not	

=== Val di Fiemme ===
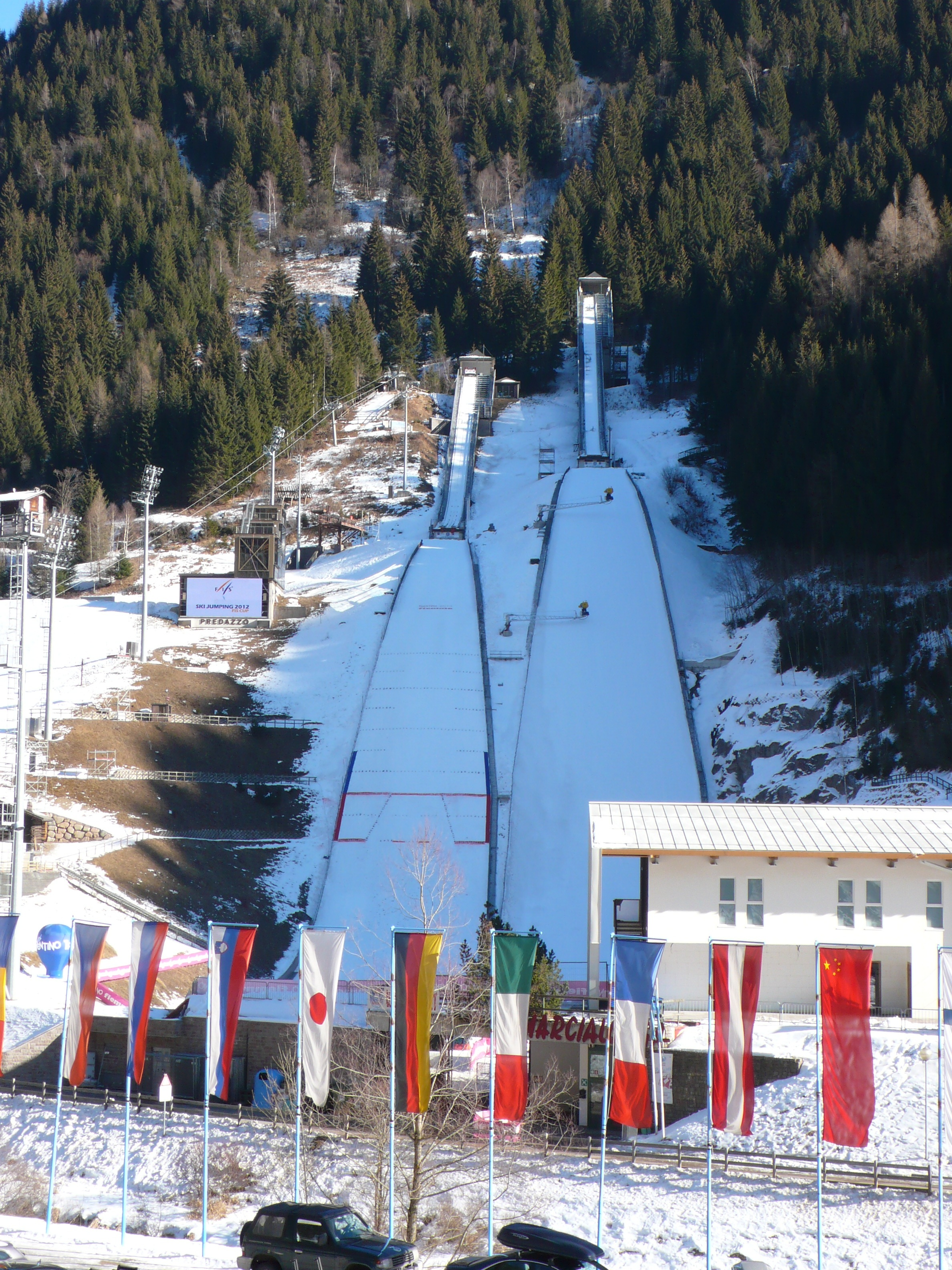
Trampolino Giuseppe Dal Ben

Venue	Sports	Capacity	Ref.
Stadio del Fondo di Lago di Tesero, Tesero	Biathlon, cross-country skiing, Nordic combined (XC)	8,000	
Stadio del Salto "Giuseppe Dal Ben", Predazzo	Nordic combined (SJ), ski jumping	12,000	
Stadio del Ghiaccio di Cavalese, Cavalese	Ice hockey (men's)	1,600	
Piazza Santi Apostoli Filippo e Giacomo, Predazzo	Medal plaza	not	

== Sports ==
The numbers in parentheses indicate the number of medal events contested in each sport. The two optional sports chosen for the 2013 Winter Universiade were freestyle skiing and speed skating.

- Alpine skiing (10)
- Biathlon (9)
- Cross-country skiing (11)
- Curling (2)
- Figure skating (4)
- Freestyle skiing (4)
- Ice hockey (2)
- Nordic combined (3)
- Short track speed skating (8)
- Ski jumping (5)
- Snowboarding (8)
- Speed skating (12)

== Participants ==
Following is a list of nations that entered athletes at the Universiade:

- Australia (21)
- Austria (32)
- Azerbaijan (3)
- Belarus (18)
- Belgium (9)
- Bosnia and Herzegovina (5)
- Brazil (1)
- Bulgaria (12)
- Canada (106)
- China (58)
- Croatia (10)
- Czech Republic (71)
- Estonia (14)
- Finland (34)
- France (35)
- Georgia (2)
- Germany (26)
- Great Britain (55)
- Hong Kong (1)
- Hungary (17)
- India (10)
- Iran (3)
- Italy (101) (host)
- Japan (119)
- Kazakhstan (54)
- South Korea (70)
- Latvia (28)
- Lithuania (6)
- Macedonia (2)
- Mexico (2)
- Monaco (1)
- Mongolia (4)
- Netherlands (13)
- New Zealand (7)
- Norway (34)
- Poland (85)
- Russia (184)
- San Marino (1)
- Serbia (9)
- Slovakia (47)
- Slovenia (34)
- South Africa (1)
- Spain (31)
- Sweden (58)
- Switzerland (57)
- Chinese Taipei (6)
- Thailand (1)
- Turkey (27)
- Ukraine (92)
- United States (106)

== Medal table ==
* Host nation (Italy)

Final medal tally
Rank	Nation	Gold	Silver	Bronze	Total
1	Russia	15	16	19	50
2	Poland	10	10	3	23
3	South Korea	8	9	7	24
4	China	5	2	3	10
5	Czech Republic	4	3	6	13
6	Italy*	3	5	5	13
7	France	3	4	1	8
8	Ukraine	3	3	3	9
9	Finland	3	2	3	8
10	Austria	3	2	1	6
11	Japan	3	1	4	8
12	Serbia	3	0	1	4
13	Canada	2	3	3	8
14	Slovakia	2	3	0	5
15	Kazakhstan	2	2	1	5
16	Switzerland	1	3	4	8
17	Sweden	1	2	1	4
18	Slovenia	1	1	2	4
18	United States	1	1	2	4
20	Hungary	1	1	1	3
20	Norway	1	1	1	3
22	Netherlands	1	0	1	2
23	Monaco	1	0	0	1
23	New Zealand	1	0	0	1
23	Spain	1	0	0	1
26	Belarus	0	1	1	2
26	Germany	0	1	1	2
28	Azerbaijan	0	1	0	1
28	Great Britain	0	1	0	1
30	Australia	0	0	1	1
30	Chinese Taipei	0	0	1	1
30	Lithuania	0	0	1	1
Totals (32 entries)		79	78	77	234

== Schedule ==
The competition schedule for the 2013 Winter Universiade is shown as follows:

OC	Opening ceremony	●	Event competitions	1	Event finals	EG	Exhibition gala	CC	Closing ceremony

December	10 Tue	11 Wed	12 Thu	13 Fri	14 Sat	15 Sun	16 Mon	17 Tue	18 Wed	19 Thu	20 Fri	21 Sat	Events
Ceremonies		OC										CC	
Alpine skiing				2	1	1		1	1		4		10
Biathlon				2		2	2		1		2		9
Cross-country skiing			2		2	1		2		2	1	1	11
Curling			●	●	●	●	●	●	●	●	2		2
Figure skating		●	1	1	1	1/EG							5
Freestyle skiing						2			2				4
Ice hockey	●		●	●	●	●	●	●	●	●	1	1	2
Nordic combined				1			1		1				3
Speed skating				2	2	2		2	2	2			12
Short track speed skating									2	2	4		8
Ski jumping					2			1	1		1		5
Snowboarding		●	2		2		●	2			●	2	8
Total events			5	9	10	9	3	8	10	6	15	4	79
Cumulative total			5	14	24	33	36	44	54	60	75	79	
December	10 Tue	11 Wed	12 Thu	13 Fri	14 Sat	15 Sun	16 Mon	17 Tue	18 Wed	19 Thu	20 Fri	21 Sat	Events
