= Joffrey Pollet-Villard =

French freestyle skier (born 1992)

Personal information
- Nationality: French
- Born: 1992 (age 33–34)

Sport
- Country: France
- Sport: Freestyle skiing
Medal record
Men's freestyle skiing
Representing France
World Championships
Silver medal – second place	2015 Kreischberg	Halfpipe

Joffrey Pollet-Villard (born 1992) is a French freestyle skier. He won a silver medal in halfpipe at the FIS Freestyle Ski and Snowboarding World Championships 2015, behind Kyle Smaine.
