= Yannic Lerjen =

Swiss freestyle skier

Personal information
- Born: July 26, 1990 (age 35) Täsch, Switzerland

Sport
- Sport: Skiing
Medal record
Men's freestyle skiing
Representing Switzerland
World Championships
Bronze medal – third place	2015 Kreischberg	Halfpipe

Yannic Lerjen (born July 26, 1990 in Täsch) is a Swiss freestyle skier, specializing in halfpipe and slopestyle.

Lerjen competed at the 2014 Winter Olympics for Switzerland. He placed 14th in the qualifying round in the halfpipe, failing to advance.

Lerjen made his World Cup debut in January 2011. As of April 2014, his best World Cup finish is 4th, at Calgary in 2013–14. His best World Cup overall finish in a discipline is 8th, in the 2013–14 halfpipe.
