= Felix Stridsberg-Usterud =

Norwegian freestyle skier

Personal information
- Born: 3 November 1994 (age 31)

Sport
- Country: Norway
- Sport: Freestyle skiing
- Event(s): Slopestyle, Big air
- Club: Bærums SK

Felix Stridsberg-Usterud (born 3 November 1994) is a Norwegian freestyle skier.

Felix competed in the 2017–18 FIS Freestyle Ski World Cup and represented Norway in slopestyle at the 2018 Winter Olympics in PyeongChang.
