= Alex Bellemare =

Canadian skier from St-Boniface, Quebec

Medal record

Men's Freestyle skiing

Representing Canada

Winter X Games
Bronze medal – third place	2015 Aspen	Slopestyle

Alex Bellemare is a Canadian skier from Saint-Boniface, Quebec. He has competed in numerous skiing events, such as the Winter X Games. In Aspen 2015, he took Bronze at the Winter X Games XIX in Slopestyle Skiing. Alex also represented Canada in slopestyle at the 2018 Winter Olympics in PyeongChang.
