= Kai Mahler =

Swiss freestyle skier

Medal record

Men's Freestyle skiing

Representing Switzerland

Winter X Games
Silver medal – second place	2012 Aspen	Big Air
Silver medal – second place	2013 Aspen	Big Air
Bronze medal – third place	2014 Aspen	Big Air
Bronze medal – third place	2017 Aspen	Big Air

Youth Olympic Games
Gold medal – first place	2012 Innsbruck	Halfpipe

Kai Mahler (born 11 September 1995) is a Swiss freestyle skier who grew up in Fischenthal, Switzerland. His mother is from Germany and his father is from Switzerland. He won a silver medal in the Big Air competition at Winter X Games XVI. Kai is currently sponsored by Redbull, K2, Marker, Buff, Electric, Audi, Sporthilfe, Full Tilt, Sportmittelschule, and Swisscom. Kai has appeared in X-Games twice, both times receiving silver medals in the Big Air Competition. Other major competition results include a second place at Freestyle.ch in Switzerland in 2012, and in 2011, a first-place finish at the Frost Gun Invitational in France, as well as many other strong finishes.
