= Pavel Nabokikh =

Russian freestyle skier

Personal information
- Born: 13 July 1989 (age 37) Moscow, Russian SSR, Soviet Union

Sport
- Sport: Skiing

Pavel Nabokikh (born 13 July 1989 in Moscow) is a Russian freestyle skier, specializing in halfpipe.

Nabokikh competed at the 2014 Winter Olympics for Russia. He placed 24th in the qualifying round in the halfpipe, failing to advance.

As of April 2014, his best showing at the World Championships is 22nd, in the 2013 halfpipe.

Nabokikh made his World Cup debut in January 2013. As of April 2014, his best World Cup finish is 17th, at Calgary in 2013–14. His best World Cup overall finish in halfpipe is 39th, in 2013–14.
