= Joona Kangas =

Finnish freestyle skier (born 1997)

Personal information
- Born: 28 April 1997 (age 29)

Sport
- Country: Finland
- Sport: Freestyle skiing
- Event: Slopestyle

Joona Kangas (born 28 April 1997) is a Finnish freestyle skier. He competed in the 2015 and 2017 FIS Freestyle World Ski Championships, and in the 2018 Winter Olympics.
