= Benoit Buratti =

French freestyle skier

Personal information
- Born: 10 November 1997 (age 27)

Sport
- Country: France
- Sport: Freestyle skiing
- Event: Slopestyle

Benoit Buratti (born 10 November 1997) is a French freestyle skier.

He competed in the 2017 FIS Freestyle World Ski Championships, and represented France at the 2018 Winter Olympics in PyeongChang.
