= Catrine Lavallée =

Canadian freestyle skier

Personal information
- Born: 24 November 1995 (age 29)

Sport
- Country: Canada
- Sport: Freestyle skiing
- Event: Aerials

Catrine Lavallée (born 24 November 1995) is a Canadian freestyle skier who competes internationally.

She represented Canada at the 2018 Winter Olympics.
