= FIS Freestyle Ski and Snowboarding World Championships 2015 =

2015 edition of the FIS Freestyle Ski and Snowboarding World Championships

- Logo
- Host city: Kreischberg
- Country: Austria
- Nations: 40
- Events: 24
- Opening: January 15, 2015
- Closing: January 25, 2015
- Website: kreischberg2015.at

The 2015 FIS Freestyle Ski and Snowboarding World Championships were held in Kreischberg, Austria from January 15–25, 2015. In 2014, the FIS (International Ski Federation) decided to merge the FIS Freestyle World Ski Championships with the FIS Snowboarding World Championships starting with these championships. The Austrian municipality of Kreischberg was awarded the event in 2010.

Qualification for the women's aerials event began a day before the opening ceremony. Freestyle skiers competed in six disciplines: moguls, dual moguls, ski cross, slopestyle, halfpipe and aerials. Snowboarders competed in six disciplines: halfpipe, slopestyle, parallel slalom, parallel giant slalom, big air and snowboard cross.

== Schedule ==
Q	Qualification	F	Final

Event↓/Date →	Wed 14	Thu 15	Fri 16	Sat 17	Sun 18		Mon 19		Tue 20	Wed 21	Thu 22		Fri 23		Sat 24	Sun 25
Moguls					Q	F										
Dual Moguls							Q	F								
Aerials	Q	F														
Freestyle halfpipe										Q	Q	F				
Freestyle slopestyle									Q	F						
Ski cross															Q	F
Big air													Q		F	
Snowboard halfpipe			Q	F												
Snowboard slopestyle							Q			F						
Snowboard cross		Q	F													
Parallel giant slalom													Q	F		
Parallel slalom											Q	F				

== Medalists ==
=== Freestyle skiing ===
==== Men's events ====
Event	Gold		Silver		Bronze	
Moguls	Anthony Benna; France	86.89	Mikaël Kingsbury; Canada	86.54	Alexandr Smyshlyaev; Russia	85.68
Dual moguls	Mikaël Kingsbury; Canada		Philippe Marquis; Canada		Marc-Antoine Gagnon; Canada	
Aerials	Qi Guangpu; China	139.50	Alex Bowen; United States	121.27	Maxim Gustik; Belarus	119.91
Halfpipe	Kyle Smaine; United States	88.00	Joffrey Pollet-Villard; France	86.60	Yannic Lerjen; Switzerland	82.40
Slopestyle	Fabian Bösch; Switzerland	92.60	Russell Henshaw; Australia	91.80	Noah Wallace; United States	82.40
Ski cross	Filip Flisar; Slovenia		Jean-Frédéric Chapuis; France		Victor Öhling Norberg; Sweden	

==== Women's events ====
Event	Gold		Silver		Bronze	
Moguls	Justine Dufour-Lapointe; Canada	87.25	Hannah Kearney; United States	85.66	Britteny Cox; Australia	81.98
Dual moguls	Hannah Kearney; United States		Justine Dufour-Lapointe; Canada		Yulia Galysheva; Kazakhstan	
Aerials	Laura Peel; Australia	88.47	Kiley McKinnon; United States	88.12	Xu Mengtao; China	86.84
Halfpipe	Virginie Faivre; Switzerland	83.80	Cassie Sharpe; Canada	81.00	Mirjam Jäger; Switzerland	79.80
Slopestyle	Lisa Zimmermann; Germany	85.80	Katie Summerhayes; Great Britain	82.80	Zuzana Stromkova; Slovakia	77.60
Ski cross	Andrea Limbacher; Austria		Ophélie David; France		Fanny Smith; Switzerland	

=== Snowboarding ===
==== Men's events ====
Event	Gold		Silver		Bronze	
Big air	Roope Tonteri; Finland	173.75	Darcy Sharpe; Canada	169.50	Kyle Mack; United States	163.50
Halfpipe	Scotty James; Australia	91.50	Yiwei Zhang; China	89.50	Tim-Kevin Ravnjak; Slovenia	89.25
Slopestyle	Ryan Stassel; United States	97.50	Roope Tonteri; Finland	93.75	Kyle Mack; United States	92.75
Snowboard cross	Luca Matteotti; Italy		Kevin Hill; Canada		Nick Baumgartner; United States	
Parallel giant slalom	Andrey Sobolev; Russia		Žan Košir; Slovenia		Benjamin Karl; Austria	
Parallel slalom	Roland Fischnaller; Italy		Andrey Sobolev; Russia		Rok Marguč; Slovenia	

==== Women's events ====
Event	Gold		Silver		Bronze	
Big air	Elena Könz; Switzerland	157.75	Merika Enne; Finland	148.75	Sina Candrian; Switzerland	143.25
Halfpipe	Xuetong Cai; China	94.25	Queralt Castellet; Spain	81.25	Clémence Grimal; France	80.25
Slopestyle	Miyabi Onitsuka; Japan	92.50	Anna Gasser; Austria	89.50	Klaudia Medlova; Slovakia	84.25
Snowboard cross	Lindsay Jacobellis; United States		Nelly Moenne Loccoz; France		Michela Moioli; Italy	
Parallel giant slalom	Claudia Riegler; Austria		Alena Zavarzina; Russia		Tomoka Takeuchi; Japan	
Parallel slalom	Ester Ledecka; Czech Republic		Julia Dujmovits; Austria		Marion Kreiner; Austria	

== Participating countries ==
A total of 40 countries entered athletes.

- Andorra
- Argentina
- Australia
- Austria
- Belarus
- Belgium
- Brazil
- Bulgaria
- Canada
- China
- Croatia
- Czech Republic
- Denmark
- Finland
- France
- Georgia
- Germany
- United Kingdom
- Greece
- Hungary
- Iran
- Ireland
- Italy
- Japan
- Kazakhstan
- Netherlands
- New Zealand
- Norway
- Poland
- Romania
- Russia
- Serbia
- Slovakia
- Slovenia
- South Korea
- Spain
- Sweden
- Switzerland
- Ukraine
- United States

== Medal table ==
Rank	Nation	Gold	Silver	Bronze	Total
1	United States (USA)	4	3	4	11
2	Switzerland (SUI)	3	0	4	7
3	Canada (CAN)	2	6	1	9
4	Austria (AUT)	2	2	2	6
5	Australia (AUS)	2	1	1	4
5	China (CHN)	2	1	1	4
7	Italy (ITA)	2	0	1	3
8	France (FRA)	1	4	1	6
9	Russia (RUS)	1	2	1	4
10	Finland (FIN)	1	2	0	3
11	Slovenia (SLO)	1	1	2	4
12	Japan (JPN)	1	0	1	2
13	Czech Republic (CZE)	1	0	0	1
13	Germany (GER)	1	0	0	1
15	Great Britain (GBR)	0	1	0	1
15	Spain (ESP)	0	1	0	1
17	Slovakia (SVK)	0	0	2	2
18	Belarus (BLR)	0	0	1	1
18	Kazakhstan (KAZ)	0	0	1	1
18	Sweden (SWE)	0	0	1	1
Totals (20 entries)		24	24	24	72

== Broadcasting ==
This was the first time the championships were available for live viewing on YouTube for free of charge, in countries where broadcasting agreements were not in place.
