= Julia Manhard =

German freestyle skier

Julia Manhard (born 28 August 1987 in Füssen) is a freestyle skier associated with ski cross. She represented Germany at the 2010 Winter Olympics.
