= Zuzana Stromková =

Slovak freestyle skier (born 1990)

Medal record

Women's freestyle skiing

Representing Slovakia

World Championships
Bronze medal – third place	2015 Kreischberg	Slopestyle

Winter Universiade
Silver medal – second place	2015 Granada	Slopestyle

Zuzana Stromková (born 21 May 1990) is a Slovak freestyle skier. She competed at the 2014 Winter Olympics, where she placed 20th in slopestyle.

Stromková won a bronze medal in Slopestyle at the FIS Freestyle Ski and Snowboarding World Championships 2015.
