= Marzhan Akzhigit =

Kazakhstani freestyle skier (born 2000)

Personal information
- Nationality: Kazakhstani
- Born: 29 June 2000 (age 25)
- Height: 1.65 m (5 ft 5 in)

Sport
- Sport: Freestyle skiing

Marzhan Akzhigit (Маржан Қайратқызы Ақжігіт, born 29 June 2000) is a Kazakhstani freestyle skier. She competed in the 2018 Winter Olympics.
