= Kim Kyoung-eun =

South Korean freestyle skier

Personal information
- Nationality: South Korean
- Born: 8 August 1998 (age 27)
- Height: 1.61 m (5 ft 3 in)

Sport
- Sport: Freestyle skiing

Kim Kyoung-eun (born 8 August 1998) is a South Korean freestyle skier. She competed in the 2018 Winter Olympics.
