= Kristina Spiridonova =

Russian freestyle skier

Personal information
- Born: 21 August 1998 (age 27) Ufa, Bashkortostan, Russia

Sport
- Country: Russia
- Sport: Freestyle skiing
- Event: Aerials
Medal record
Representing Russia
Winter Universiade
Silver medal – second place	2019 Krasnoyarsk	Team aerials

Kristina Sergeyevna Spiridonova (Russian: Кристина Сергеевна Спиридонова) (born 21 August 1998) is a Russian freestyle skier who competes internationally.

She participated at the 2018 Winter Olympics.
