= Zhanbota Aldabergenova =

Kazakh freestyle skier (born 1995)

Personal information
- Born: 23 September 1995 (age 30) Shymkent, Kazakhstan

Sport
- Sport: Skiing
Medal record
Representing Kazakhstan
Winter Universiade
Gold medal – first place	2017 Almaty	Team aerials
Bronze medal – third place	2017 Almaty	Aerials
Bronze medal – third place	2019 Krasnoyarsk	Aerials

Zhanbota Yerkinovna Aldabergenova (Kazakh: Жанбота Еркиновна Алдабергенова, Janbota Erkinovna Aldabergenova; born 23 September 1995) is a Kazakh freestyle skier. She was born in Shymkent.

She competed at the 2014 Winter Olympics, where she placed sixth in the women's aerials.
