= Madison Olsen =

American freestyle skier

Personal information
- Born: April 7, 1995 (age 29)

Sport
- Country: United States
- Sport: Freestyle skiing
- Event: Aerials

Madison Olsen (born April 7, 1995) is an American freestyle skier who competes internationally. She was raised in Park City, Utah.

She participated at the 2018 Winter Olympics.
