= Tyler Harding =

British freestyle skier

Personal information
- Born: 18 October 1996 (age 28)

Sport
- Country: Great Britain
- Sport: Freestyle skiing
- Event: Slopestyle

Tyler Harding (born 18 October 1996) is a British freestyle skier. He competed in the 2013 and 2017 FIS Freestyle World Ski Championships, and in the 2018 Winter Olympics.
