= Kiley McKinnon =

American freestyle skier

Personal information
- Born: September 1, 1995 (age 30) Madison, Connecticut
- Height: 175 cm (5 ft 9 in)

Sport
- Sport: Skiing
- Club: US Ski Team, Elite Aerial Development Program

World Cup career
- Seasons: 4
- Indiv. podiums: 7
Medal record
Overall World Cup Champion 2015
Women's freestyle skiing
Representing United States
World Championships 2013, 2015
Silver medal – second place	2015 Kreischberg	Aerials
Silver medal – second place	2015 Deer Valley World Cup	Aerials

Kiley McKinnon (born September 1, 1995) is an American freestyle skier. She came in first place in the aerials competition during the 2015 FIS World Cup Champion and also won a silver medal in aerials at the FIS Freestyle Ski and Snowboarding World Championships 2015 in Kreischberg, Austria. In 2018, McKinnon represented Team USA in the PyeongChang Olympics and placed 10th in aerials. McKinnon is a co-founder of Halfdays, a direct-to-consumer brand for women's ski wear made of recycled fabrics that launched in November 2020.

== Ski career ==
In 2010, McKinnon was recruited to the U.S. Ski and Snowboard Association's Elite Aerial Development program by friend, Mac Bohonnon. McKinnon's first national aerial competition was the 2011 U.S. National Championships. In 2012, she was a member of the first graduating class of the United States Ski and Snowboard Association USSA TEAM Academy. In 2013, she was named the FIS "Rookie of the Year". McKinnon competed at the world cup level in December 2014 at the Bird's Nest in Beijing, China. She placed twice, taking bronze in the individual competition and second in the team competition. The third podium of her career occurred in January 2015 alongside US Ski Team Freestyle aerialist, Ashley Caldwell. McKinnon won a silver medal. She went on to compete in the 2018 Winter Olympics in Pyeongchang, South Korea. She placed 10th in the aerials competition for Team USA.

== Halfdays ==
Along with co-founders Ariana Ferwerda and Karelle Golda, McKinnon launched her womenswear ski brand Halfdays during the COVID-19 pandemic in November 2020. The sustainable fashion ski wear brand targets the womenswear market and aims to achieve "comfort, utility, function and style" while breaking down the barrier to entry for females to winter sports. The textile production facility that manufactures Halfdays is environmentally mindful.
