= Kyle Smaine =

American freestyle skier (1991–2023)

Kyle David Smaine
Personal information
- Born: June 27, 1991 Apple Valley, California, U.S.
- Died: January 29, 2023 (aged 31) Otari, Nagano, Japan
- Education: Sierra Nevada College
- Spouse: Jenna Dramise (m. 2022)

Sport
- Sport: Freestyle skiing
Medal record
Men's freestyle skiing
Representing United States
World Championships
Gold medal – first place	2015 Kreischberg	Halfpipe

Kyle David Smaine (June 27, 1991 – January 29, 2023) was an American freestyle skier. He won a gold medal in halfpipe at the FIS Freestyle Ski and Snowboarding World Championships 2015.

Smaine met Jenna Dramise in 2010 while hitchhiking in New Zealand. They married on November 18, 2022.

Smaine died alongside an Austrian skier in an avalanche on Mount Norikura, located in the northern part of the Hida Mountains near Tsugaike Ski Resort in Otari, Nagano, Japan, on January 29, 2023, at the age of 31.
