= Beau-James Wells =

New Zealand freestyle skier

Beau-James Wells (born 17 November 1995) is a New Zealand freestyle skier. He represented his country at the 2014 Winter Olympics in Sochi, finishing in 21st place in the qualifying round of the Men's Slopestyle and did not advance to the final. He was the flag bearer in the opening ceremony of 2018 Winter Olympics in Pyongchang. His brothers Byron, Jossi, and Jackson are all also freestyle skiers.
