= Kentaro Tsuda =

Japanese freestyle skier (born 1983)

Personal information
- Born: December 29, 1983 (age 42) Hakui District, Ishikawa, Japan

Sport
- Sport: Skiing

Kentaro Tsuda (津田 健太朗, Tsuda Kentarō) (born December 29, 1983, in Hakui District, Ishikawa) is a Japanese freestyle skier, specializing in halfpipe.

Tsuda competed at the 2014 Winter Olympics for Japan. He placed 22nd in the qualifying round in the halfpipe, failing to advance.

As of April 2014, his best showing at the World Championships is 19th, in the 2009 halfpipe.

Tsuda made his World Cup debut in February 2008. As of April 2014, his best World Cup finish is 7th, at Calgary in 2013–14. His best World Cup overall finish in halfpipe is 13th, in 2013–14.
