= Antti-Jussi Kemppainen =

Finnish freestyle skier

Personal information
- Born: 21 July 1989 (age 36) Kuusamo, Finland

Sport
- Sport: Skiing

World Cup career
- Indiv. podiums: 4
- Indiv. wins: 1

Antti-Jussi Kemppainen (born 21 July 1989) is a Finnish freestyle skier, specializing in halfpipe and slopestyle.

Kemppainen competed at the 2014 Winter Olympics for Finland. He placed 9th in the qualifying round in the halfpipe, advancing to the final. He finished 8th in the final, with a best run of 78.20 points.

As of April 2014, his best showing at the World Championships is 5th, in the 2013 halfpipe.

Kemppainen, who was born in Kuusamo, made his World Cup debut in January 2006. As of April 2014, he has one World Cup win, at Cardrona in 2013–14, and three other podium finishes. His best World Cup overall finish in halfpipe is 2nd, in 2006–07.

== World Cup podiums ==
Date	Location	Rank	Event
23 February 2007	Apex	2nd place, silver medalist(s)	Halfpipe
25 February 2012	Jyväskylä	2nd place, silver medalist(s)	Slopestyle
25 March 2013	Sierra Nevada	2nd place, silver medalist(s)	Halfpipe
17 August 2013	Cardrona	1st place, gold medalist(s)	Halfpipe
