= James Machon (skier) =

British freestyle skier (born 1990)

Personal information
- Nickname: Mach
- Nationality: British
- Born: 23 November 1990 (age 35) Sheffield, Yorkshire, England
- Education: Bamford Primary School; Leeds Metropolitan University
- Height: 1.76 m (5 ft 9 in)
- Weight: 75 kg (165 lb)
- Website: www.jamesmachon.blogspot.com

Sport
- Country: Great Britain
- Sport: Freestyle skiing
- Event: Halfpipe
- Club: GB Freeski team
- Coached by: Pat Sharples; Jamie Matthew
- Updated on 17 February 2014

James Machon (born 23 November 1990) is a freestyle skier who competes in the halfpipe, his first Olympics was the 2014 Winter Olympics in Sochi.

== Biography ==
Machon was born on 23 November 1990, in Sheffield, Yorkshire, England. He was schooled at Bamford Primary School, and went to Leeds Metropolitan University. He started skiing at the age of 6. Between the age of 6 and until he was 14, went on annual ski holidays with his family. He began practising freestyle skiing in the Sheffield freestyle skiing park when he was 15 years old. Half-pipe skiing is snow ski on a half-pipe. The sport is considered to be dangerous compared to other sports, and helmets are required to be worn during competitions. Half-pipe skiing has been part of the Winter X Games since 2002, and has been approved to be an official sport at the 2014 Winter Olympics in Sochi, Russia.

In 2006 Machon entered his first British Championships, and in the period from 2009 to 2013 (inclusive), Machon won four consecutive British Halfpipe Championships. At the start of the Olympic qualifying season, Machon was ranked in the top 15 by the Association of Freeskiing Professionals, a position he feels is his "greatest sporting achievement so far". Shortly before the selection for the 2014 Winter Olympics, Machon was recovering from a severe knee injury, he had a tear in his anterior cruciate ligament, which kept him from competing for eight months; it was torn in training in Austria. Machon said that his competing after he tore his ligament was "looking virtually impossible", but he was happy he overcame the injury.

=== Olympics ===
Machon's Olympic debut was at the 2014 Winter Olympics in Sochi, which was also the first time skiing halfpipe had been at an Olympics. He competed on 18 February 2014 in the halfpipe, an event in freestyle skiing. He finished 23rd.

=== Family ===
Machon's brother, Robert, also skis competitively, and is a member of the England Team.
