= Jackson Wells =

New Zealand freestyle skier

Personal information
- Born: 21 April 1998 (age 26)

Sport
- Country: New Zealand
- Sport: Freestyle skiing
- Event: Slopestyle

Jackson "Wacko" Wells (born 21 April 1998) is a New Zealand freestyle skier who competes internationally. He represented New Zealand in slopestyle at the 2018 Winter Olympics in PyeongChang.
