= Kim Kwang-jin (skier) =

South Korean freestyle skier

Personal information
- Born: June 10, 1995 (age 31) Ansan, South Korea

Sport
- Sport: Skiing
Medal record
Men's freestyle skiing
Representing South Korea
Winter Universiade
Silver medal – second place	2015 Granada	Ski halfpipe

- Kim Kwang-jin
- Hangul: 김광진
- RR: Gim Gwangjin
- MR: Kim Kwangjin

Kim Kwang-jin (born June 10, 1995 in Ansan) is a South Korean freestyle skier, specializing in halfpipe.

Kim competed at the 2014 Winter Olympics for South Korea. He placed 25th in the qualifying round in the halfpipe, failing to advance.

As of April 2014, his best showing at the World Championships is 29th, in the 2011 halfpipe.

Kim made his World Cup debut in August 2012. As of April 2014, his best World Cup finish is 18th, at Calgary in 2013–14. His best World Cup overall finish in halfpipe is 35th, in 2013–14.

== Education ==
- Dankook University
- Namyangju Donghwa High School
