= Chantal Westerman =

Former Entertainment and Hollywood Correspondent for Good Morning America

Chantal Westerman was the Entertainment Editor and Hollywood Correspondent of ABC's Good Morning America (GMA) from 1986 through 2000.

Since April 2011, Westerman has been hosting ConciergeQ Conversations with Chantal Westerman. ConciergeQ Conversations with Chantal Westerman are in-depth interviews with guests who are also featured on The Concierge Questionnaire, an online travel magazine. Her first featured guests were Fort Worth Opera and The Thrilling Adventure Hour.

== Guests-ConciergeQ Conversations with Chantal Westerman ==
- Charles Brandt
- David Berkeley
- Fairmont Hotels and Resorts
- Fort Worth Opera
- Heather Rae
- Howard T. Owens
- Jack Sullivan (CEO Broadway Video)
- Janet Hopkins
- Jim McGorman
- Jonathan Goldman
- Kat Edmonson
- Lelia Broussard
- Melba Moore
- Michael Franks (musician)
- Rider Strong
- The Thrilling Adventure Hour
