= United States at the 2014 Winter Olympics =

- Flag of the United States
- IOC code: USA
- NOC: United States Olympic Committee

in Sochi
- Competitors: 222 (122 men and 100 women) in 8 sports
- Flag bearers: Todd Lodwick (opening); Julie Chu (closing)
- Medals Ranked 4th: Gold 9 Silver 9 Bronze 10 Total 28

Winter Olympics appearances (overview)
- 1924; 1928; 1932; 1936; 1948; 1952; 1956; 1960; 1964; 1968; 1972; 1976; 1980; 1984; 1988; 1992; 1994; 1998; 2002; 2006; 2010; 2014; 2018; 2022; 2026

The United States competed at the 2014 Winter Olympics in Sochi, Russia, from February 7 to 23, 2014. Team USA consisted of 222 athletes competing in all 15 sports.

After winning an Olympic record 37 medals at the 2010 Winter Olympics in Vancouver, the United States had a somewhat disappointing performance during these games. Although the delegation ranked second in overall medals with 28, it ranked out of the top three in gold medals (with a total of nine) for the first time since Nagano in 1998 when it placed 6th in overall medals and 5th in gold medals. In figure skating, the U.S. won no medals in the men's or women's singles events for the first time since 1936.

Conversely, at the Sanki Sliding Center, the United States won more medals (seven) than any other nation. Steven Holcomb and Steven Langton won the first U.S. medal (a silver) in two-man bobsled in 62 years, while Erin Hamlin earned the first singles luge medal ever for the United States (also bronze). In skeleton, Noelle Pikus-Pace and Matthew Antoine won silver and bronze respectively, the first U.S. medals in that sport since 2002. Overall, the U.S. won four medals in bobsled events, two in skeleton, and one in luge.

Of the nine gold medals won by Team USA, seven were won by first-time Olympians. In snowboarding, Sage Kotsenburg and Jamie Anderson won gold in the inaugural slopestyle events, and Kaitlyn Farrington won the women's halfpipe. In freestyle skiing, Joss Christensen won the inaugural men's slopestyle, David Wise won men's halfpipe, and Maddie Bowman won women's halfpipe. Eighteen-year-old alpine skier Mikaela Shiffrin won gold in the slalom in her Olympic debut. Among returning Olympians, Meryl Davis and Charlie White won the first American gold in ice dancing, and Ted Ligety won gold in giant slalom, becoming the first American man to win two Olympic golds in alpine skiing. Fellow alpine skier Bode Miller, competing in his fifth winter games, became the oldest alpine medalist at age 36, winning bronze in the super-G.

The 2014 Games marked the first time a U.S. Olympic team competed in Russia, as the United States and 65 other countries boycotted the 1980 Summer Olympics held in Moscow due to the Soviet invasion of Afghanistan. President Barack Obama and Vice President Joe Biden did not attend the 2014 Winter Olympics, reportedly "as a response to the Russian government’s crackdown on LGBT rights and other human rights violations." American Nordic combined skier Todd Lodwick was the flag bearer of Team USA for the Parade of Nations during the opening ceremony. Four-time ice hockey Olympian Julie Chu was the flag bearer during the closing ceremonies.

Some results were later amended due to the Russian doping scandal.

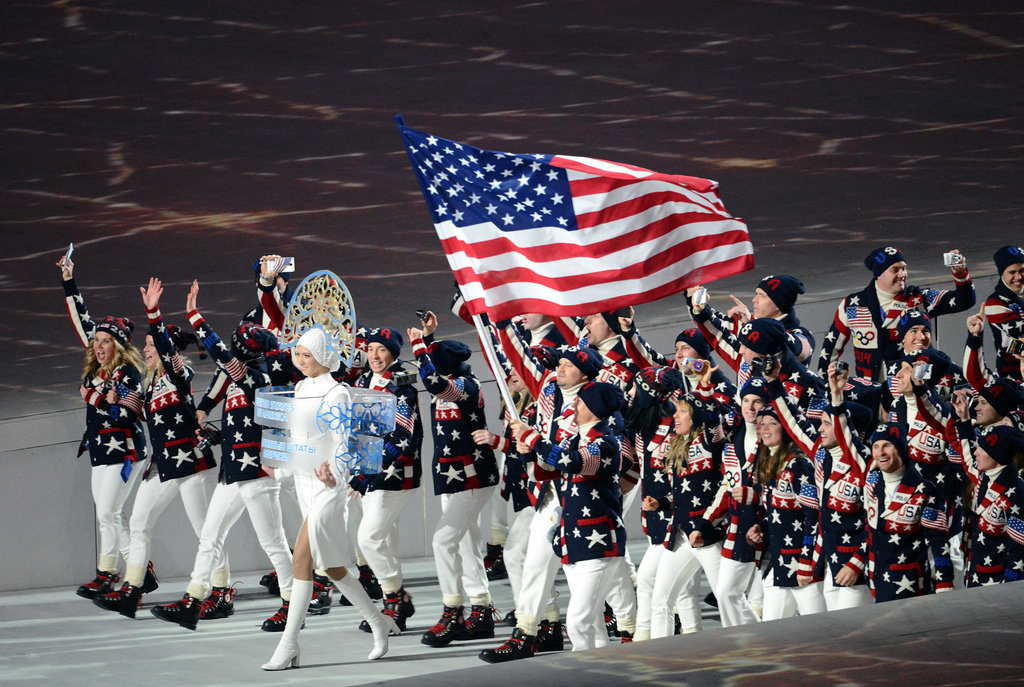
The United States team entering during the opening ceremony.

== Medalists ==
Medals by sport
Sport	1st place, gold medalist(s)	2nd place, silver medalist(s)	3rd place, bronze medalist(s)	Total
Freestyle skiing	3	2	2	**7**
Snowboarding	3	0	2	**5**
Alpine skiing	2	1	2	**5**
Figure skating	1	0	1	**2**
Bobsled	0	3	1	**4**
Skeleton	0	1	1	**2**
Ice hockey	0	1	0	**1**
Short track speed skating	0	1	0	**1**
Luge	0	0	1	**1**
Total	9	9	10	28

Medals by date
Day	Date	1st place, gold medalist(s)	2nd place, silver medalist(s)	3rd place, bronze medalist(s)	Total
1	February 8	1	0	1	**2**
2	February 9	1	0	1	**2**
3	February 10	0	0	1	**1**
4	February 11	0	1	1	**2**
5	February 12	1	0	1	**2**
6	February 13	1	1	1	**3**
7	February 14	0	1	0	**1**
8	February 15	0	0	1	**1**
9	February 16	0	1	1	**2**
10	February 17	1	1	0	**2**
11	February 18	1	0	1	**2**
12	February 19	1	1	1	**3**
13	February 20	1	1	0	**2**
14	February 21	1	1	0	**2**
16	February 23	0	1	0	**1**
Total		9	9	10	28

Medals by gender
Gender	1st place, gold medalist(s)	2nd place, silver medalist(s)	3rd place, bronze medalist(s)	Total	Percentage
Female	4	4	5	**13**	46.4%
Male	4	5	4	**13**	46.4%
Mixed	1	0	1	**2**	7.2%
Total	9	9	10	28	100%

Multiple medalists
Name	Sport	1st place, gold medalist(s)	2nd place, silver medalist(s)	3rd place, bronze medalist(s)	Total
Meryl Davis	Figure skating	1	0	1	**2**
Charlie White	Figure skating	1	0	1	**2**
Steven Holcomb	Bobsleigh	0	2	0	**2**
Steven Langton	Bobsleigh	0	2	0	**2**

The following U.S. competitors won medals at the games. In the by discipline sections below, medalists' names are bolded.

Medal	Name	Sport	Event	Date
Gold	Sage Kotsenburg	Snowboarding	Men's slopestyle	February 8
Gold	Jamie Anderson	Snowboarding	Women's slopestyle	February 9
Gold	Kaitlyn Farrington	Snowboarding	Women's halfpipe	February 12
Gold	Joss Christensen	Freestyle skiing	Men's slopestyle	February 13
Gold	Meryl Davis; Charlie White	Figure skating	Ice dancing	February 17
Gold	David Wise	Freestyle skiing	Men's halfpipe	February 18
Gold	Ted Ligety	Alpine skiing	Men's giant slalom	February 19
Gold	Maddie Bowman	Freestyle skiing	Women's halfpipe	February 20
Gold	Mikaela Shiffrin	Alpine skiing	Women's slalom	February 21
Silver	Devin Logan	Freestyle skiing	Women's slopestyle	February 11
Silver	Gus Kenworthy	Freestyle skiing	Men's slopestyle	February 13
Silver	Noelle Pikus-Pace	Skeleton	Women's	February 14
Silver	Andrew Weibrecht	Alpine skiing	Men's super-G	February 16
Silver	Elana Meyers; Lauryn Williams	Bobsleigh	Two-woman	February 19
Silver	United States women's national ice hockey team: Kacey Bellamy; Megan Bozek; Alexandra Carpenter; Julie Chu; Kendall Coyne; Brianna Decker; Meghan Duggan; Lyndsey Fry; Amanda Kessel; Hilary Knight; Jocelyne Lamoureux; Monique Lamoureux-Kolls; Gisele Marvin; Brianne McLaughlin; Michelle Picard; Josephine Pucci; Molly Schaus; Anne Schleper; Kelli Stack; Lee Stecklein; Jessie Vetter	Ice hockey	Women's tournament	February 20
Silver	Eddy Alvarez; J. R. Celski; Chris Creveling; Jordan Malone	Short track speed skating	Men's 5000 meter relay	February 21
Silver	Steven Holcomb; Steven Langton	Bobsleigh	Two-man	February 17
Silver	Christopher Fogt; Steven Holcomb; Steven Langton; Curtis Tomasevicz	Bobsleigh	Four-man	February 23
Bronze	Hannah Kearney	Freestyle skiing	Women's moguls	February 8
Bronze	Jeremy Abbott^{[a]} Jason Brown; Marissa Castelli; Meryl Davis; Gracie Gold; Simon Shnapir; Ashley Wagner^{[a]} Charlie White	Figure skating	Team trophy	February 9
Bronze	Julia Mancuso	Alpine skiing	Women's combined	February 10
Bronze	Erin Hamlin	Luge	Women's singles	February 11
Bronze	Kelly Clark	Snowboarding	Women's halfpipe	February 12
Bronze	Nick Goepper	Freestyle skiing	Men's slopestyle	February 13
Bronze	Matthew Antoine	Skeleton	Men's	February 15
Bronze	Bode Miller	Alpine skiing	Men's super-G	February 16
Bronze	Alex Deibold	Snowboarding	Men's snowboard cross	February 18
Bronze	Aja Evans; Jamie Greubel	Bobsleigh	Two-woman	February 19

^{[a]} Athletes who participated in preliminary rounds but not the final round.

== Alpine skiing ==
The United States qualified a total quota of 20 athletes in alpine skiing. The full list of the U.S. alpine skiing team was officially announced on January 27, 2014.

Men

Athlete	Event	Run 1		Run 2		Total	
Athlete	Event	Time	Rank	Time	Rank	Time	Rank
Travis Ganong	Downhill	—N/a				2:06.64	5
Bode Miller	Downhill	—N/a				2:06.75	8
Steven Nyman	Downhill	—N/a				2:09.15	27
Marco Sullivan	Downhill	—N/a				2:10.10	30
Travis Ganong	Super-G	—N/a				1:20.02	23
Ted Ligety	Super-G	—N/a				1:19.48	14
Bode Miller	Super-G	—N/a				1:18.67	3rd place, bronze medalist(s)
Andrew Weibrecht	Super-G	—N/a				1:18.44	2nd place, silver medalist(s)
Jared Goldberg	Combined	1:54.90	15	52.39	10	2:47.29	11
Ted Ligety	Combined	1:55.17	18	52.22	8	2:47.39	12
Bode Miller	Combined	1:54.67	12	51.93	7	2:46.60	6
Andrew Weibrecht	Combined	1:55.33	20	DNF			
Jared Goldberg	Giant slalom	1:23.66	27	1:23.82	6	2:47.48	19
Tim Jitloff	Giant slalom	1:23.21	21	1:23.90	8	2:47.13	15
Ted Ligety	Giant slalom	1:21.08	1	1:24.21	14	2:45.29	1st place, gold medalist(s)
Bode Miller	Giant slalom	1:23.64	26	1:24.18	13	2:47.82	20
David Chodounsky	Slalom	DNF					
Nolan Kasper	Slalom	48.70	18	55.52	=10	1:44.22	13
Ted Ligety	Slalom	47.56	6	DNF			

Women

Athlete	Event	Run 1		Run 2		Total	
Athlete	Event	Time	Rank	Time	Rank	Time	Rank
Stacey Cook	Downhill	—N/a				1:43.05	17
Julia Mancuso	Downhill	—N/a				1:42.56	8
Laurenne Ross	Downhill	—N/a				1:42.68	11
Jacqueline Wiles	Downhill	—N/a				1:44.35	26
Stacey Cook	Super-G	—N/a				DNF	
Julia Mancuso	Super-G	—N/a				1:27.04	8
Laurenne Ross	Super-G	—N/a				DNF	
Leanne Smith	Super-G	—N/a				1:28.38	18
Stacey Cook	Combined	DNF					
Julia Mancuso	Combined	1:42.68	1	52.47	13	2:35.15	3rd place, bronze medalist(s)
Laurenne Ross	Combined	DNF					
Leanne Smith	Combined	1:45.06	20	DNF			
Julia Mancuso	Giant slalom	DNF					
Megan McJames	Giant slalom	1:22.77	33	1:21.60	30	2:44.37	30
Mikaela Shiffrin	Giant slalom	1:18.79	5	1:18.58	6	2:37.37	5
Resi Stiegler	Giant slalom	1:22.68	32	1:21.38	29	2:44.07	29
Julia Ford	Slalom	58.88	30	53.99	24	1:52.87	24
Megan McJames	Slalom	DNF					
Mikaela Shiffrin	Slalom	52.62	1	51.92	6	1:44.54	1st place, gold medalist(s)
Resi Stiegler	Slalom	56.81	20	DNF			

== Biathlon ==
Based on their performance at the 2012 and 2013 Biathlon World Championships, the United States qualified five men and five women. The full list of U.S. biathlon team was officially announced on January 12, 2014.

Men

Athlete	Event	Time	Misses	Rank
Lowell Bailey	Sprint	26:04.1	2 (1+1)	35
Tim Burke	Sprint	25:23.3	1 (0+1)	19
Russell Currier	Sprint	26:58.5	4 (4+0)	61
Leif Nordgren	Sprint	26:17.4	0 (0+0)	45
Lowell Bailey	Pursuit	36:34.8	3 (0+1+1+1)	38
Tim Burke	Pursuit	35:37.0	2 (1+0+0+1)	22
Leif Nordgren	Pursuit	39:31.4	7 (3+2+1+1)	53
Lowell Bailey	Individual	50:57.4	1 (0+1+0+0)	8
Tim Burke	Individual	54:21.2	4 (0+2+0+2)	44
Russell Currier	Individual	55:07.5	4 (2+2+0+0)	50
Leif Nordgren	Individual	58:47.6	6 (1+0+5+0)	83
Lowell Bailey	Mass start	45:19.2	5 (2+1+1+1)	23
Tim Burke	Mass start	44:55.9	4 (2+0+2+0)	21
Lowell Bailey; Russell Currier; Sean Doherty; Leif Nordgren	Team relay	1:17:39.1	15 (3+12)	16

Women

Athlete	Event	Time	Misses	Rank
Annelies Cook	Sprint	23:23.4	2 (0+2)	53
Hannah Dreissigacker	Sprint	23:55.0	4 (1+3)	65
Susan Dunklee	Sprint	21:48.3	1 (0+1)	14
Sara Studebaker	Sprint	22:59.5	1 (1+0)	44
Annelies Cook	Pursuit	36:20.9	5 (2+1+1+1)	54
Susan Dunklee	Pursuit	31:11.6	4 (0+1+0+3)	18
Sara Studebaker	Pursuit	35:00.0	5 (3+1+0+1)	51
Lanny Barnes	Individual	53:02.2	3 (1+0+1+1)	64
Susan Dunklee	Individual	48:54.1	5 (1+1+2+1)	34
Hannah Dreissigacker	Individual	47:51.7	2 (1+0+0+1)	23
Sara Studebaker	Individual	50:53.4	4 (2+1+1+0)	55
Susan Dunklee	Mass start	36:57.9	3 (0+1+1+1)	11
Annelies Cook; Hannah Dreissigacker; Susan Dunklee; Sara Studebaker	Team relay	1:12:14.2	13 (0+13)	7

Mixed

Athlete	Event	Time	Misses	Rank
Lowell Bailey; Tim Burke; Hannah Dreissigacker; Susan Dunklee	Team relay	1:12:20.1	14 (1+13)	8

== Bobsleigh ==
Men

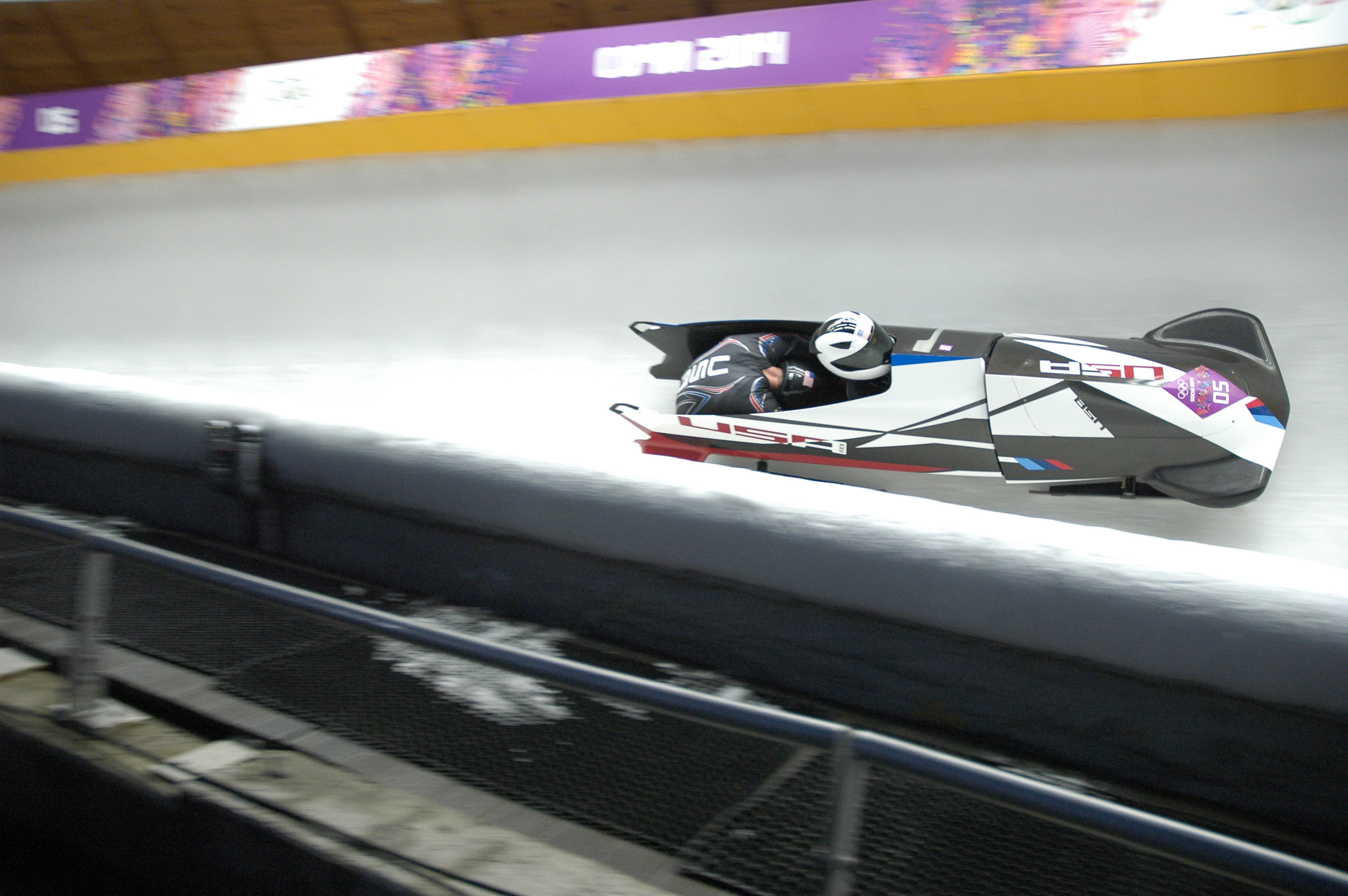
USA-2 two-man sled

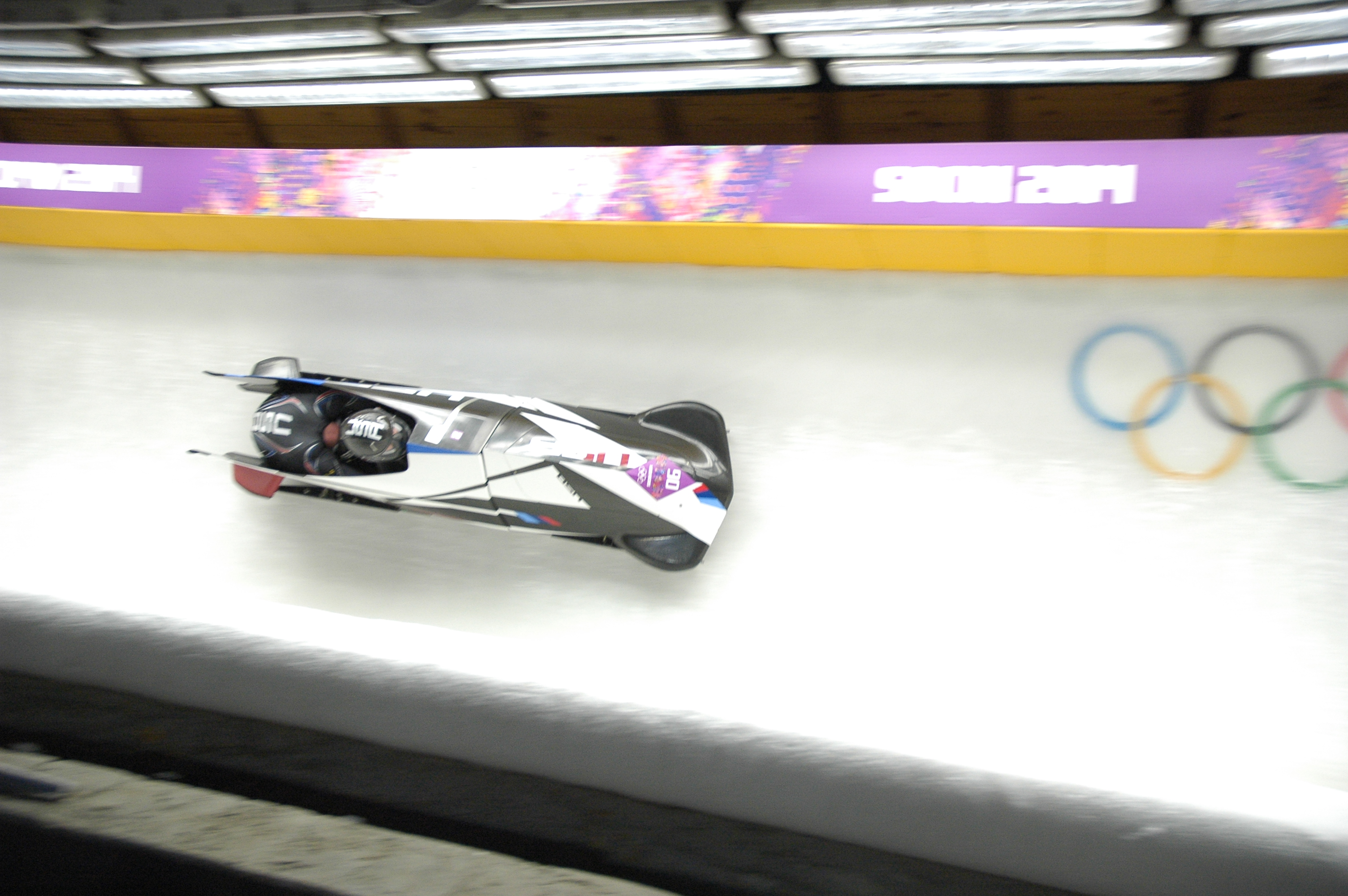
USA-3 two-man sled

Athlete	Event	Run 1		Run 2		Run 3		Run 4		Total	
Athlete	Event	Time	Rank	Time	Rank	Time	Rank	Time	Rank	Time	Rank
Cory Butner*; Christopher Fogt	Two-man	56.45	3	57.11	16	56.77	=11	56.86	12	3:47.19	12
Nick Cunningham*; Dallas Robinson	Two-man	56.73	12	57.07	15	56.98	14	56.91	13	3:47.69	13
Steven Holcomb*; Steven Langton	Two-man	56.34	2	56.84	8	56.41	3	56.68	4	3:46.27	2nd place, silver medalist(s)
Nick Cunningham*; Justin Olsen; Johnny Quinn; Dallas Robinson	Four-man	55.61	14	55.48	12	55.97	=17	55.64	11	3:42.70	12
Christopher Fogt; Steven Holcomb*; Steven Langton; Curtis Tomasevicz	Four-man	54.89	3	55.47	=9	55.30	4	55.33	4	3:40.99	2nd place, silver medalist(s)

* – Denotes the driver of each sled

Women

Athlete	Event	Run 1		Run 2		Run 3		Run 4		Total	
Athlete	Event	Time	Rank	Time	Rank	Time	Rank	Time	Rank	Time	Rank
Aja Evans; Jamie Greubel*	Two-woman	57.45	3	58.00	3	58.00	3	58.16	5	3:51.61	3rd place, bronze medalist(s)
Jazmine Fenlator*; Lolo Jones	Two-woman	58.27	11	58.46	12	58.50	10	58.74	=12	3:53.97	11
Elana Meyers*; Lauryn Williams	Two-woman	57.26	1	57.63	1	57.69	2	58.13	=3	3:50.71	2nd place, silver medalist(s)

* – Denotes the driver of each sled

== Cross-country skiing ==
The team was named on January 22, 2014.

Distance
Men

Athlete	Event	Classical		Freestyle		Total		
Athlete	Event	Time	Rank	Time	Rank	Time	Deficit	Rank
Erik Bjornsen	15 km classical	—N/a				41:44.7	+3:15.0	35
Kris Freeman	15 km classical	—N/a				42:54.8	+4:25.1	52
Brian Gregg	15 km classical	—N/a				42:42.0	+4:12.3	47
Noah Hoffman	15 km classical	—N/a				41:02.7	+2:33.0	31
Erik Bjornsen	30 km skiathlon	37:05.6	33	35:05.5	50	1:12:42.3	+4:26.9	42
Kris Freeman	30 km skiathlon	37:30.5	41	36:30.8	61	1:14:34.6	+6:19.2	54
Brian Gregg	30 km skiathlon	38:57.4	53	33:53.3	37	1:13:26.3	+5:10.9	47
Noah Hoffman	30 km skiathlon	37:19.3	37	33:34.1	34	1:11:28.1	+3:12.7	35
Kris Freeman	50 km freestyle	—N/a				1:59:46.7	+12:51.5	57
Brian Gregg	50 km freestyle	—N/a				1:55:02.3	+8:07.1	51
Noah Hoffman	50 km freestyle	—N/a				1:48:04.3	+1:09.1	26
Torin Koos	50 km freestyle	—N/a				DNS		
Erik Bjornsen; Simi Hamilton; Noah Hoffman; Andrew Newell	4×10 km relay	—N/a				1:33:15.1	+4:33.1	11

Women

Athlete	Event	Classical		Freestyle		Total		
Athlete	Event	Time	Rank	Time	Rank	Time	Deficit	Rank
Sadie Bjornsen	10 km classical	—N/a				29:59.7	+1:41.9	16
Holly Brooks	10 km classical	—N/a				31:19.1	+3:01.3	32
Sophie Caldwell	10 km classical	—N/a				31:11.4	+2:53.6	29
Ida Sargent	10 km classical	—N/a				31:15.1	+2:57.3	31
Sadie Bjornsen	15 km skiathlon	19:56.8	22	20:37.0	36	41:09.7	+2:36.1	31
Holly Brooks	15 km skiathlon	20:22.3	38	21:34.6	50	42:34.0	+4:00.4	47
Jessie Diggins	15 km skiathlon	20:01.7	27	19:29.5	8	40:05.5	+1:31.9	8
Liz Stephen	15 km skiathlon	20:14.7	31	19:22.2	7	40:09.6	+1:36.0	12
Holly Brooks	30 km freestyle	—N/a				1:14:58.3	+3:53.1	27
Jessie Diggins	30 km freestyle	—N/a				1:18:13.0	+7:07.8	40
Kikkan Randall	30 km freestyle	—N/a				1:15:10.7	+4:05.5	28
Liz Stephen	30 km freestyle	—N/a				1:14:11.8	+3:06.6	24
Sadie Bjornsen; Jessie Diggins; Kikkan Randall; Liz Stephen	4×5 km relay	—N/a				55:33.4	+2:30.7	9

Sprint
Men

Athlete	Event	Qualification		Quarterfinal		Semifinal		Final	
Athlete	Event	Time	Rank	Time	Rank	Time	Rank	Time	Rank
Erik Bjornsen	Sprint	3:40.39	39	Did not advance					
Simi Hamilton	Sprint	3:36.12	21 Q	3:39.83	6	Did not advance			
Torin Koos	Sprint	3:40.27	=37	Did not advance					
Andrew Newell	Sprint	3:35.52	17 Q	3:37.12	4	Did not advance			
Erik Bjornsen; Simi Hamilton	Team sprint	—N/a				23:29.14	5 q	23:49.95	6

Qualification legend: Q – Qualify on position in heat; q – Qualify on time in round

Women

Athlete	Event	Qualification		Quarterfinal		Semifinal		Final	
Athlete	Event	Time	Rank	Time	Rank	Time	Rank	Time	Rank
Sophie Caldwell	Sprint	2:35.18	9 Q	2:37.21	2 Q	2:36.67	2 Q	2:47.75	6
Jessie Diggins	Sprint	2:35.64	12 Q	2:38.06	3	Did not advance			
Kikkan Randall	Sprint	2:36.67	18 Q	2:35.70	4	Did not advance			
Ida Sargent	Sprint	2:39.80	26 Q	2:39.05	4	Did not advance			
Sophie Caldwell; Kikkan Randall	Team sprint	—N/a				16:51.36	3 q	16:48.08	8

Qualification legend: Q – Qualify on position in heat; q – Qualify on time in round

== Curling ==
Based on results from the 2012 World Women's Curling Championship and the 2013 World Women's Curling Championship, the United States qualified their women's team as one of the seven highest ranked nations. The United States has also qualified their men's team through the Olympic qualification event.

Summary

Team	Event	Group stage										Tiebreaker	Semifinal	Final / BM	
Team	Event	Opposition Score	Opposition Score	Opposition Score	Opposition Score	Opposition Score	Opposition Score	Opposition Score	Opposition Score	Opposition Score	Rank	Opposition Score	Opposition Score	Opposition Score	Rank
Craig Brown; Jeff Isaacson; John Landsteiner; John Shuster (S); Jared Zezel	Men's tournament	NOR; L 4–7	CHN; L 4–9	DEN; W 9–5	GBR; L 3–5	GER; W 8–5	RUS; L 6–7	CAN; L 6–8	SWE; L 4–6	SUI; L 3–6	9	Did not advance			
Erika Brown (S); Debbie McCormick; Allison Pottinger; Jessica Schultz; Ann Swisshelm	Women's tournament	SUI; L 4–7	RUS; L 6–9	GBR; L 3–12	CHN; L 4–7	JPN; W 8–6	DEN; L 2–9	SWE; L 6–7	CAN; L 6–7	KOR; L 2–11	10	Did not advance			

=== Men's tournament ===
Team The United States men's curling team curled out of the Duluth Curling Club in Duluth, Minnesota.

Position	Curler
Skip	John Shuster
Third	Jeff Isaacson
Second	Jared Zezel
Lead	John Landsteiner
Alternate	Craig Brown

Round-robin

Final round robin standings
Team	Skip	Pld	W	L	PF	PA	EW	EL	BE	SE	S%	Qualification
Sweden	Niklas Edin	9	8	1	60	44	38	30	18	8	86%	Playoffs
Canada	Brad Jacobs	9	7	2	69	53	39	36	14	7	84%	Playoffs
China	Liu Rui	9	7	2	67	50	41	37	11	5	85%	Playoffs
Norway	Thomas Ulsrud	9	5	4	52	53	36	33	18	5	86%	Tiebreaker
Great Britain	David Murdoch	9	5	4	51	49	37	35	15	8	83%	Tiebreaker
Denmark	Rasmus Stjerne	9	4	5	54	61	32	37	17	4	81%	
Russia	Andrey Drozdov	9	3	6	58	70	36	38	13	7	77%	
Switzerland	Sven Michel	9	3	6	47	46	31	34	22	7	83%	
United States	John Shuster	9	2	7	47	58	30	39	14	7	80%	
Germany	John Jahr	9	1	8	53	74	38	39	10	9	76%	

Draw 2
Monday, February 10, 7:00 pm

Sheet A	1	2	3	4	5	6	7	8	9	10	Final
United States (Shuster)	0	1	0	2	0	0	0	1	0	X	4
Norway (Ulsrud) 🔨	2	0	3	0	0	1	1	0	0	X	7

Draw 3
Tuesday, February 11, 2:00 pm

Sheet B	1	2	3	4	5	6	7	8	9	10	Final
United States (Shuster)	0	1	0	2	0	1	0	0	X	X	4
China (Liu) 🔨	1	0	3	0	2	0	1	2	X	X	9

Draw 4
Wednesday, February 12, 9:00 am

Sheet A	1	2	3	4	5	6	7	8	9	10	Final
Denmark (Stjerne) 🔨	3	0	0	0	0	0	0	0	2	0	5
United States (Shuster)	0	2	1	2	1	0	0	1	0	2	9

Draw 6
Thursday, February 13, 2:00 pm

Sheet D	1	2	3	4	5	6	7	8	9	10	Final
Great Britain (Murdoch)	1	0	2	0	1	0	0	1	0	X	5
United States (Shuster) 🔨	0	0	0	1	0	0	1	0	1	X	3

Draw 7
Friday, February 14, 9:00 am

Sheet C	1	2	3	4	5	6	7	8	9	10	Final
United States (Shuster)	0	0	4	0	0	0	4	0	0	X	8
Germany (Jahr) 🔨	0	1	0	1	0	1	0	1	1	X	5

Draw 8
Friday, February 14, 7:00 pm

Sheet B	1	2	3	4	5	6	7	8	9	10	Final
Russia (Drozdov) 🔨	0	2	1	0	2	0	0	0	1	1	7
United States (Shuster)	0	0	0	3	0	2	1	0	0	0	6

Draw 10
Sunday, February 16, 9:00 am

Sheet A	1	2	3	4	5	6	7	8	9	10	Final
United States (Shuster) 🔨	0	0	2	2	0	1	0	1	0	0	6
Canada (Jacobs)	2	1	0	0	2	0	0	0	2	1	8

Draw 11
Sunday, February 16, 7:00 pm

Sheet D	1	2	3	4	5	6	7	8	9	10	Final
United States (Shuster)	0	0	0	2	0	0	1	0	1	X	4
Sweden (Edin) 🔨	0	3	0	0	1	1	0	1	0	X	6

Draw 12
Monday, February 17, 2:00 pm

Sheet C	1	2	3	4	5	6	7	8	9	10	Final
Switzerland (Michel) 🔨	1	1	0	0	1	0	2	1	0	X	6
United States (Shuster)	0	0	0	1	0	1	0	0	1	X	3

=== Women's tournament ===
Team
The United States women's curling team curled out of the Madison Curling Club in Madison, Wisconsin.

Position	Curler
Skip	Erika Brown
Third	Debbie McCormick
Second	Jessica Schultz
Lead	Ann Swisshelm
Alternate	Allison Pottinger

Round-robin

Final round robin standings
Team	Skip	Pld	W	L	PF	PA	EW	EL	BE	SE	S%	Qualification
Canada	Jennifer Jones	9	9	0	72	40	43	27	12	14	86%	Playoffs
Sweden	Margaretha Sigfridsson	9	7	2	58	52	37	35	13	7	80%	Playoffs
Switzerland	Mirjam Ott	9	5	4	63	60	37	38	13	7	78%	Playoffs
Great Britain	Eve Muirhead	9	5	4	74	58	39	35	9	11	80%	Playoffs
Japan	Ayumi Ogasawara	9	4	5	59	67	39	41	4	10	76%	
Denmark	Lene Nielsen	9	4	5	57	56	34	40	12	9	78%	
China	Wang Bingyu	9	4	5	58	62	36	38	10	4	81%	
South Korea	Kim Ji-sun	9	3	6	60	65	35	37	10	6	79%	
Russia	Anna Sidorova	9	3	6	48	56	33	35	19	6	82%	
United States	Erika Brown	9	1	8	42	75	33	40	8	5	76%	

Draw 1
Monday, February 10, 2:00 pm

Sheet B	1	2	3	4	5	6	7	8	9	10	Final
Switzerland (Ott) 🔨	0	0	0	3	2	0	0	2	0	X	7
United States (Brown)	1	0	1	0	0	1	0	0	1	X	4

Draw 2
Tuesday, February 11, 9:00 am

Sheet C	1	2	3	4	5	6	7	8	9	10	Final
Russia (Sidorova)	0	1	0	2	2	0	2	0	2	X	9
United States (Brown) 🔨	1	0	3	0	0	1	0	1	0	X	6

Draw 3
Tuesday, February 11, 7:00 pm

Sheet A	1	2	3	4	5	6	7	8	9	10	Final
Great Britain (Muirhead)	1	1	0	7	0	3	X	X	X	X	12
United States (Brown) 🔨	0	0	1	0	2	0	X	X	X	X	3

Draw 4
Wednesday, February 12, 2:00 pm

Sheet B	1	2	3	4	5	6	7	8	9	10	Final
United States (Brown)	1	0	1	0	0	1	0	0	1	0	4
China (Wang) 🔨	0	1	0	0	2	0	0	2	0	2	7

Draw 6
Thursday, February 13, 7:00 pm

Sheet D	1	2	3	4	5	6	7	8	9	10	Final
Japan (Ogasawara) 🔨	0	2	0	0	1	0	1	0	2	0	6
United States (Brown)	1	0	1	2	0	1	0	2	0	1	8

Draw 7
Friday, February 14, 2:00 pm

Sheet C	1	2	3	4	5	6	7	8	9	10	Final
United States (Brown)	0	0	1	0	1	0	0	0	X	X	2
Denmark (Nielsen) 🔨	0	2	0	2	0	2	2	1	X	X	9

Draw 9
Saturday, February 15, 7:00 pm

Sheet A	1	2	3	4	5	6	7	8	9	10	Final
United States (Brown) 🔨	1	0	1	0	2	0	0	2	0	0	6
Sweden (Sigfridsson)	0	1	0	2	0	2	0	0	0	2	7

Draw 10
Sunday, February 16, 2:00 pm

Sheet D	1	2	3	4	5	6	7	8	9	10	11	Final
United States (Brown)	0	0	3	0	1	0	0	1	0	1	0	6
Canada (Jones) 🔨	2	1	0	1	0	1	1	0	0	0	1	7

Draw 11
Monday, February 17, 9:00 am

Sheet B	1	2	3	4	5	6	7	8	9	10	Final
South Korea (Kim) 🔨	4	1	0	2	2	0	2	X	X	X	11
United States (Brown)	0	0	1	0	0	1	0	X	X	X	2

== Figure skating ==
Individual

Athlete	Event	SP/SD		FS/FD		Total	
Athlete	Event	Points	Rank	Points	Rank	Points	Rank
Jeremy Abbott	Men's singles	72.58	15 Q	160.12	8	232.70	12
Jason Brown	Men's singles	86.00	6 Q	152.37	11	238.37	9
Polina Edmunds	Ladies' singles	61.04	7 Q	122.21	9	183.25	9
Gracie Gold	Ladies' singles	68.63	4 Q	136.90	5	205.53	4
Ashley Wagner	Ladies' singles	65.21	6 Q	127.99	7	193.20	7
Felicia Zhang / Nathan Bartholomay	Pairs	56.90	14 Q	110.31	12	167.21	12
Marissa Castelli / Simon Shnapir	Pairs	67.44	9 Q	120.38	9	187.82	9
Madison Chock / Evan Bates	Ice dancing	65.46	8 Q	99.18	8	164.64	8
Meryl Davis / Charlie White	Ice dancing	78.89	1 Q	116.63	1	195.52	1st place, gold medalist(s)
Maia Shibutani / Alex Shibutani	Ice dancing	64.47	9 Q	90.70	10	155.17	9

Team

Athlete	Event	Short program/Short dance						Free skate/Free dance					
Athlete	Event	Men's	Ladies'	Pairs	Ice dance	Total		Men's	Ladies'	Pairs	Ice dance	Total	
Athlete	Event	Points Team points	Points Team points	Points Team points	Points Team points	Points	Rank	Points Team points	Points Team points	Points Team points	Points Team points	Points	Rank
Jeremy Abbott (M); Jason Brown (M); Gracie Gold (L); Ashley Wagner (L); Marissa Castelli / Simon Shnapir (P); Meryl Davis / Charlie White (I)	Team trophy	65.65; 4	63.10; 7	64.25; 6	75.98; 10	27	3 Q	153.67; 7	129.38; 9	117.94; 7	114.34; 10	60	3rd place, bronze medalist(s)

== Freestyle skiing ==
Only 26 of the 34 quota places earned could be filled. The 11 slopestyle and halfpipe skiers who earned their Olympic berths at the qualifying events were named to the team on January 18, 2014, and the rest of the team was named on January 21, 2014.

15-year-old Maggie Voisin originally qualified for the slopestyle event but had to withdraw due to an injury.

Aerials

Athlete	Event	Qualification				Final					
Athlete	Event	Jump 1		Jump 2		Jump 1		Jump 2		Jump 3	
Athlete	Event	Points	Rank	Points	Rank	Points	Rank	Points	Rank	Points	Rank
Mac Bohonnon	Men's aerials	104.79	11	110.18	6 Q	105.21	7 Q	113.72	5	Did not advance	
Ashley Caldwell	Women's aerials	101.25	1 Q	Bye		72.80	10	Did not advance			
Emily Cook	Women's aerials	80.01	5 Q	Bye		82.21	6 Q	64.50	8	Did not advance	

Freeskiing
Men

Athlete	Event	Qualification				Final			
Athlete	Event	Run 1	Run 2	Best	Rank	Run 1	Run 2	Best	Rank
Aaron Blunck	Halfpipe	69.40	72.00	72.00	12 Q	68.60	79.40	79.40	7
Lyman Currier	Halfpipe	4.20	12.60	12.60	28	Did not advance			
David Wise	Halfpipe	88.40	68.60	68.60	2 Q	92.00	3.40	92.00	1st place, gold medalist(s)
Torin Yater-Wallace	Halfpipe	7.00	39.00	39.00	26	Did not advance			
Bobby Brown	Slopestyle	3.40	83.00	83.00	12 Q	29.20	78.40	78.40	9
Joss Christensen	Slopestyle	91.00	93.20	93.20	1 Q	95.80	93.80	95.80	1st place, gold medalist(s)
Nick Goepper	Slopestyle	14.80	87.00	87.00	4 Q	92.40	61.80	92.40	3rd place, bronze medalist(s)
Gus Kenworthy	Slopestyle	86.40	85.80	86.40	5 Q	31.00	93.60	93.60	2nd place, silver medalist(s)

Women

Athlete	Event	Qualification				Final			
Athlete	Event	Run 1	Run 2	Best	Rank	Run 1	Run 2	Best	Rank
Maddie Bowman	Halfpipe	85.60	85.20	85.60	3 Q	85.80	89.00	89.00	1st place, gold medalist(s)
Annalisa Drew	Halfpipe	61.20	72.40	72.40	11 Q	66.40	9.60	66.40	9
Brita Sigourney	Halfpipe	87.00	80.40	87.00	2 Q	27.80	76.00	76.00	6
Angeli Vanlaanen	Halfpipe	68.20	83.00	83.00	5 Q	13.80	29.60	29.60	11
Keri Herman	Slopestyle	27.40	72.40	72.40	11 Q	50.00	35.40	50.00	10
Julia Krass	Slopestyle	78.40	39.20	78.40	8 Q	42.40	38.60	42.40	11
Devin Logan	Slopestyle	79.40	80.40	80.40	5 Q	85.40	30.00	85.40	2nd place, silver medalist(s)

Moguls
Men

Athlete	Event	Qualification								Final											
Athlete	Event	Run 1				Run 2				Run 1				Run 2				Run 3			
Athlete	Event	Time	Points	Total	Rank	Time	Points	Total	Rank	Time	Points	Total	Rank	Time	Points	Total	Rank	Time	Points	Total	Rank
Patrick Deneen	Moguls	23.64	3.51	10.36	25	24.71	16.03	22.38	1 Q	24.67	15.90	22.27	9 Q	24.00	16.64	23.32	6 Q	23.83	15.40	22.16	6
Bradley Wilson	Moguls	23.39	14.71	21.68	8 Q	Bye				24.83	3.61	9.90	20	Did not advance							

Women

Athlete	Event	Qualification								Final											
Athlete	Event	Run 1				Run 2				Run 1				Run 2				Run 3			
Athlete	Event	Time	Points	Total	Rank	Time	Points	Total	Rank	Time	Points	Total	Rank	Time	Points	Total	Rank	Time	Points	Total	Rank
Hannah Kearney	Moguls	30.14	17.06	23.05	1 Q	Bye				31.54	15.52	20.95	7 Q	31.18	16.36	21.93	1 Q	31.04	15.86	21.49	3rd place, bronze medalist(s)
Heidi Kloser	Moguls	DNS								Did not advance											
Heather McPhie	Moguls	31.65	14.53	19.92	14	31.21	13.29	18.85	6 Q	30.24	14.10	20.05	13	Did not advance							
Eliza Outtrim	Moguls	30.79	15.78	21.51	4 Q	Bye				31.70	16.44	21.81	2 Q	31.90	16.24	21.53	5 Q	31.49	13.92	19.37	6

Ski cross

Athlete	Event	Seeding		1/8 final	Quarterfinal	Semifinal	Final	
Athlete	Event	Time	Rank	Position	Position	Position	Position	Rank
John Teller	Men's ski cross	1:18.14	20	DNF	Did not advance			28

Qualification legend: FA – Qualify to medal round; FB – Qualify to consolation round

== Ice hockey ==
Summary

Key:

- OT – Overtime
- GWS – Match decided by penalty-shootout

Team	Event	Group stage				Qualification playoff	Quarterfinal	Semifinal / Pl.	Final / BM / Pl.	
Team	Event	Opposition Score	Opposition Score	Opposition Score	Rank	Opposition Score	Opposition Score	Opposition Score	Opposition Score	Rank
United States men's	Men's tournament	Slovakia; W 7–1	Russia; W 3–2 GWS	Slovenia; W 5–1	1 QQ	Bye	Czech Republic; W 5–2	Canada; L 0–1	Finland; L 0–5	4
United States women's	Women's tournament	Finland; W 3–1	Switzerland; W 9–0	Canada; L 2–3	2 QS	—N/a	Bye	Sweden; W 6–1	Canada; L 2–3 OT	2nd place, silver medalist(s)

=== Men's tournament ===
The United States qualified a men's team by being one of the nine highest-ranked teams in the IIHF World Ranking following the 2012 World Championships.

Roster The following is the American roster in the men's ice hockey tournament of the 2014 Winter Olympics.

No.	Pos.	Name	Height	Weight	Birthdate	Birthplace	2013–14 team
3	D	Cam Fowler	6 ft 1 in (185 cm)	196 lb (89 kg)	5 December 1991	Windsor, ON	(United States) Anaheim Ducks (NHL)
4	D	John Carlson	6 ft 3 in (191 cm)	212 lb (96 kg)	10 January 1990	Colonia, NJ	(United States) Washington Capitals (NHL)
7	D	Paul Martin	6 ft 1 in (185 cm)	200 lb (91 kg)	5 March 1981	Elk River, MN	(United States) Pittsburgh Penguins (NHL)
8	F	Joe Pavelski	5 ft 11 in (180 cm)	190 lb (86 kg)	11 July 1984	Plover, WI	(United States) San Jose Sharks (NHL)
9	F	Zach Parise – C	5 ft 11 in (180 cm)	190 lb (86 kg)	28 July 1984	Prior Lake, MN	(United States) Minnesota Wild (NHL)
12	F	Derek Stepan	6 ft 1 in (185 cm)	196 lb (89 kg)	18 June 1990	Hastings, MN	(United States) New York Rangers (NHL)
17	F	Ryan Kesler	6 ft 2 in (188 cm)	202 lb (92 kg)	31 August 1984	Livonia, MI	(Canada) Vancouver Canucks (NHL)
20	D	Ryan Suter – A	6 ft 1 in (185 cm)	198 lb (90 kg)	21 January 1985	Madison, WI	(United States) Minnesota Wild (NHL)
21	F	James van Riemsdyk	6 ft 3 in (191 cm)	200 lb (91 kg)	4 May 1989	Middletown, NJ	(Canada) Toronto Maple Leafs (NHL)
22	D	Kevin Shattenkirk	5 ft 11 in (180 cm)	207 lb (94 kg)	29 January 1989	Greenwich, CT	(United States) St. Louis Blues (NHL)
23	F	Dustin Brown – A	6 ft 1 in (185 cm)	212 lb (96 kg)	4 November 1984	Ithaca, NY	(United States) Los Angeles Kings (NHL)
24	F	Ryan Callahan	5 ft 11 in (180 cm)	180 lb (82 kg)	21 March 1985	Rochester, NY	(United States) New York Rangers (NHL)
26	F	Paul Stastny	6 ft 1 in (185 cm)	205 lb (93 kg)	27 December 1985	Quebec City, QC	(United States) Colorado Avalanche (NHL)
27	D	Ryan McDonagh	6 ft 1 in (185 cm)	213 lb (97 kg)	13 June 1989	St. Paul, MN	(United States) New York Rangers (NHL)
28	F	Blake Wheeler	6 ft 5 in (196 cm)	205 lb (93 kg)	31 August 1986	Robbinsdale, MN	(Canada) Winnipeg Jets (NHL)
32	G	Jonathan Quick	6 ft 1 in (185 cm)	218 lb (99 kg)	21 January 1986	Milford, CT	(United States) Los Angeles Kings (NHL)
35	G	Jimmy Howard	6 ft 0 in (183 cm)	218 lb (99 kg)	26 March 1984	Syracuse, NY	(United States) Detroit Red Wings (NHL)
39	G	Ryan Miller	6 ft 2 in (188 cm)	175 lb (79 kg)	17 July 1980	East Lansing, MI	(United States) Buffalo Sabres (NHL)
42	F	David Backes	6 ft 3 in (191 cm)	221 lb (100 kg)	1 May 1984	Minneapolis, MN	(United States) St. Louis Blues (NHL)
44	D	Brooks Orpik	6 ft 2 in (188 cm)	219 lb (99 kg)	26 September 1980	San Francisco, CA	(United States) Pittsburgh Penguins (NHL)
67	F	Max Pacioretty	6 ft 2 in (188 cm)	219 lb (99 kg)	20 November 1988	New Canaan, CT	(Canada) Montreal Canadiens (NHL)
72	D	Justin Faulk	6 ft 0 in (183 cm)	215 lb (98 kg)	20 March 1992	S. St. Paul, MN	(United States) Carolina Hurricanes (NHL)
74	F	T. J. Oshie	5 ft 11 in (180 cm)	189 lb (86 kg)	23 December 1986	Everett, WA	(United States) St. Louis Blues (NHL)
81	F	Phil Kessel	6 ft 1 in (185 cm)	202 lb (92 kg)	2 October 1987	Madison, WI	(Canada) Toronto Maple Leafs (NHL)
88	F	Patrick Kane	5 ft 11 in (180 cm)	181 lb (82 kg)	19 November 1988	Buffalo, NY	(United States) Chicago Blackhawks (NHL)

Preliminary round
The United States was drawn into Group A.

Team	Pld	W	OTW	OTL	L	GF	GA	GD	Pts	Qualification
United States	3	2	1	0	0	15	4	+11	8	Quarterfinals
Russia	3	1	1	1	0	8	5	+3	6	
Slovenia	3	1	0	0	2	6	11	−5	3	
Slovakia	3	0	0	1	2	2	11	−9	1	

Source: IIHF

All times are local (UTC+4).

13 February 2014; 16:30	Slovakia	1–7 (0–1, 1–6, 0–0)	United States	Shayba Arena, Sochi; Attendance: 4,119

Game reference

Jaroslav Halák (out 33:30)
Peter Budaj (in 33:30)
Goalies
Jonathan Quick
Referees:
(Czech Republic) Antonín Jeřábek
(Canada) Kevin Pollock
Linesmen:
(Canada) Mark Wheler
(Canada) Jesse Wilmot

	0–1	14:27 – J. Carlson (P. Kessel, J. van Riemsdyk)
T. Tatar (Mari. Hossa) – 20:24	1–1
	1–2	21:26 – R. Kesler (P. Kane)
	1–3	22:32 – P. Stastny (M. Pacioretty, T. Oshie)
	1–4	28:16 – D. Backes (P. Kessel)
	1–5	33:30 – P. Stastny (K. Shattenkirk, T. Oshie)
	1–6	34:20 – P. Kessel (R. Kesler, J. van Riemsdyk)
	1–7	35:17 – D. Brown (J. Carlson, P. Kane)

4 min
Penalties
2 min
23
Shots
33

15 February 2014; 16:30	United States	3–2 (SO) (0–0, 1–1, 1–1, 0–0, 1–0)	Russia	Bolshoy Ice Dome, Sochi; Attendance: 11,678

Game reference

Jonathan Quick
Goalies
Sergei Bobrovsky
Referees:
(United States) Brad Meier
(Sweden) Marcus Vinnerborg
Linesmen:
(Canada) Greg Devorski
(Canada) Jesse Wilmot

	0–1	29:15 – P. Datsyuk (A. Markov, A. Radulov)
C. Fowler (J. van Riemsdyk, P. Kessel) (PP) – 36:34	1–1
J. Pavelski (P. Kane, K. Shattenkirk) (PP) – 49:27	2–1
	2–2	52:44 – P. Datsyuk (A. Markov) (PP)

T. Oshie
J. van Riemsdyk (miss)
J. Pavelski (miss)
T. Oshie (miss)
T. Oshie
T. Oshie
T. Oshie (miss)
T. Oshie
Shootout
(miss) E. Malkin
(miss) P. Datsyuk
I. Kovalchuk
(miss) I. Kovalchuk
P. Datsyuk
I. Kovalchuk
(miss) P. Datsyuk
(miss) I. Kovalchuk
12 min
Penalties
10 min
34
Shots
31

A Russian goal scored late in the third period, which would have given the team a 3–2 lead, was disallowed after referees ruled that the net was moved when the goal was scored. The decision resulted in the score remaining 2–2. USA went on to win the game in a shootout, which resulted in Russia playing a playoff qualification game while USA received a bye to the quarterfinals. The decision was criticized by many Russian politicians, TV hosts and commentators. Following the game, protesters led by the Kremlin party's youth group held a demonstration in front of the U.S. Embassy in Moscow to protest the decision. In response to the controversy, Konstantin Komissarov, the referee supervisor of International Ice Hockey Federation, officially confirmed that the decision by the referee was correct, citing the appropriate use of video review in assessing the play.

16 February 2014; 16:30	Slovenia	1–5 (0–2, 0–2, 1–1)	United States	Shayba Arena, Sochi; Attendance: 4,892

Game reference

Luka Gračnar
Goalies
Ryan Miller
Referees:
(Canada) Mike Leggo
(Finland) Jyri Rönn
Linesmen:
(Slovakia) Miroslav Valach
(Canada) Mark Wheler

	0–1	1:04 – P. Kessel (J. Pavelski)
	0–2	4:33 – P. Kessel (J. Pavelski, B. Orpik)
	0–3	31:05 – P. Kessel (J. van Riemsdyk, J. Pavelski)
	0–4	32:17 – R. McDonagh (B. Wheeler, T. Oshie)
	0–5	43:26 – D. Backes (R. Callahan, D. Brown)
M. Rodman (D. Rodman, J. Urbas) – 59:42	1–5

4 min
Penalties
6 min
18
Shots
28

Quarterfinals

19 February 2014; 21:00	United States	5–2 (3–1, 1–0, 1–1)	Czech Republic	Shayba Arena, Sochi; Attendance: 4,606

Game reference

Jonathan Quick
Goalies
Ondřej Pavelec (out 29:31)
Alexander Salák (in 29:31)
Referees:
(Russia) Konstantin Olenin
(Canada) Kevin Pollock
Linesmen:
(Canada) Derek Amell
(Belarus) Ivan Dedioulia

J. van Riemsdyk (R. Kesler, P. Kane) – 1:39	1–0
	1–1	4:31 – A. Hemský
D. Brown (D. Backes, R. Suter) – 14:38	2–1
D. Backes (R. Suter, R. McDonagh) – 19:58	3–1
Z. Parise (J. Pavelski, R. Suter) (PP) – 29:31	4–1
P. Kessel (R. Kesler, K. Shattenkirk) – 42:01	5–1
	5–2	53:00 – A. Hemský

2 min
Penalties
6 min
25
Shots
23

Semifinals

21 February 2014; 21:00	United States	0–1 (0–0, 0–1, 0–0)	Canada	Bolshoy Ice Dome, Sochi; Attendance: 11,172

Game reference
Jonathan Quick	Goalies	Carey Price	Referees: (United States) Brad Meier (Canada) Kelly Sutherland; Linesmen: (Belarus) Ivan Dedioulia (Canada) Greg Devorski
0–1 / 21:41 – J. Benn (J. Bouwmeester)			Referees: (United States) Brad Meier (Canada) Kelly Sutherland; Linesmen: (Belarus) Ivan Dedioulia (Canada) Greg Devorski
4 min	Penalties	6 min	Referees: (United States) Brad Meier (Canada) Kelly Sutherland; Linesmen: (Belarus) Ivan Dedioulia (Canada) Greg Devorski
31	Shots	37	Referees: (United States) Brad Meier (Canada) Kelly Sutherland; Linesmen: (Belarus) Ivan Dedioulia (Canada) Greg Devorski

Bronze medal game

22 February 2014; 19:00	United States	0–5 (0–0, 0–2, 0–3)	Finland (bronze)	Bolshoy Ice Dome, Sochi; Attendance: 9,052

Game reference

Jonathan Quick
Goalies
Tuukka Rask
Referees:
(Russia) Konstantin Olenin
(United States) Tim Peel
Linesmen:
(Canada) Chris Carlson
(Belarus) Ivan Dedioulia

0–1	21:27 – T. Selänne (M. Granlund, L. Korpikoski)
0–2	21:38 – J. Jokinen (J. Lehterä, P. Kontiola)
0–3	46:10 – J. Hietanen (T. Ruutu, S. Lepistö)
0–4	49:06 – T. Selänne (M. Granlund, L. Korpikoski) (PP)
0–5	53:09 – O. Määttä (J. Lehterä, J. Jokinen) (PP)

12 min
Penalties
4 min
27
Shots
29

=== Women's tournament ===
The women's team qualified by being one of the five highest-ranked teams in the IIHF World Ranking following the 2012 Women's World Championships.

Roster The following is the United States roster in the women's ice hockey tournament of the 2014 Winter Olympics.

Head coach: (United States) Katey Stone Assistant coaches: (United States) Hilary Witt, (United States) Bobby Jay

No.	Pos.	Name	Height	Weight	Birthdate	Birthplace	2013–14 team
2	D	Lee Stecklein	183 cm (6 ft 0 in)	77 kg (170 lb)	23 April 1994 (aged 19)	Roseville, Minnesota	(United States) Minnesota Golden Gophers (NCAA)
7	F	Monique Lamoureux-Kolls	168 cm (5 ft 6 in)	70 kg (150 lb)	3 July 1989 (aged 24)	Grand Forks, North Dakota	(United States) University of North Dakota (NCAA)
9	D	Megan Bozek	173 cm (5 ft 8 in)	80 kg (180 lb)	27 March 1991 (aged 22)	Buffalo Grove, Illinois	(United States) Minnesota Golden Gophers (NCAA)
10	F	Meghan Duggan – C	178 cm (5 ft 10 in)	75 kg (165 lb)	3 September 1987 (aged 26)	Danvers, Massachusetts	(United States) Boston Blades (CWHL)
13	F	Julie Chu	173 cm (5 ft 8 in)	67 kg (148 lb)	13 March 1982 (aged 31)	Fairfield, Connecticut	(Canada) Montreal Stars (CWHL)
14	F	Brianna Decker	160 cm (5 ft 3 in)	68 kg (150 lb)	13 May 1991 (aged 22)	Dousman, Wisconsin	(United States) Wisconsin Badgers (NCAA)
15	D	Anne Schleper	178 cm (5 ft 10 in)	77 kg (170 lb)	30 January 1990 (aged 24)	St. Cloud, Minnesota	(United States) Boston Blades (CWHL)
16	F	Kelli Stack	163 cm (5 ft 4 in)	61 kg (134 lb)	13 January 1988 (aged 26)	Brooklyn Heights, Ohio	(United States) Boston Blades (CWHL)
17	F	Jocelyne Lamoureux	165 cm (5 ft 5 in)	68 kg (150 lb)	3 July 1989 (aged 24)	Grand Forks, North Dakota	(United States) University of North Dakota (NCAA)
18	F	Lyndsey Fry	173 cm (5 ft 8 in)	75 kg (165 lb)	30 October 1992 (aged 21)	Chandler, Arizona	(United States) Harvard Crimson (NCAA)
19	D	Gigi Marvin	173 cm (5 ft 8 in)	70 kg (150 lb)	7 March 1987 (aged 26)	Warroad, Minnesota	(United States) Boston Blades (CWHL)
21	F	Hilary Knight	180 cm (5 ft 11 in)	84 kg (185 lb)	12 July 1989 (aged 24)	Sun Valley, Idaho	(United States) Boston Blades (CWHL)
22	D	Kacey Bellamy	170 cm (5 ft 7 in)	66 kg (146 lb)	22 April 1987 (aged 26)	Westfield, Massachusetts	(United States) Boston Blades (CWHL)
23	D	Michelle Picard	163 cm (5 ft 4 in)	68 kg (150 lb)	27 May 1993 (aged 20)	Taunton, Massachusetts	(United States) Harvard Crimson (NCAA)
24	D	Josephine Pucci	173 cm (5 ft 8 in)	68 kg (150 lb)	27 December 1990 (aged 23)	Pearl River, New York	(United States) Harvard Crimson (NCAA)
25	F	Alex Carpenter	168 cm (5 ft 6 in)	73 kg (161 lb)	13 April 1994 (aged 19)	North Reading, Massachusetts	(United States) Boston College Eagles (NCAA)
26	F	Kendall Coyne	157 cm (5 ft 2 in)	57 kg (126 lb)	25 May 1992 (aged 21)	Palos Heights, Illinois	(United States) Northeastern Huskies (NCAA)
28	F	Amanda Kessel	165 cm (5 ft 5 in)	61 kg (134 lb)	28 August 1991 (aged 22)	Madison, Wisconsin	(United States) Minnesota Golden Gophers (NCAA)
29	G	Brianne McLaughlin	175 cm (5 ft 9 in)	58 kg (128 lb)	20 June 1987 (aged 26)	Sheffield, Ohio	(Canada) Burlington Barracudas (CWHL)
30	G	Molly Schaus	175 cm (5 ft 9 in)	70 kg (150 lb)	29 July 1988 (aged 25)	Natick, Massachusetts	(United States) Boston Blades (CWHL)
31	G	Jessie Vetter	173 cm (5 ft 8 in)	68 kg (150 lb)	19 December 1985 (aged 28)	Cottage Grove, Wisconsin	(United States) Oregon Outlaws (GLHL)

Preliminary round
The United States was drawn into Group A.

Team	Pld	W	OTW	OTL	L	GF	GA	GD	Pts	Qualification
Canada	3	3	0	0	0	11	2	+9	9	Semifinals
United States	3	2	0	0	1	14	4	+10	6	Semifinals
Finland	3	0	1	0	2	5	9	−4	2	Quarterfinals
Switzerland	3	0	0	1	2	3	18	−15	1	Quarterfinals

Source: IIHF

All times are local (UTC+4).

8 February 2014; 12:00	United States	3–1 (1–0, 2–0, 0–1)	Finland	Shayba Arena, Sochi; Attendance: 4,135

Game reference

Jessie Vetter
Goalies
Noora Räty
Referee:
(Germany) Nicole Hertrich
Linesmen:
(Sweden) Therese Bjorkman
(Canada) Stephanie Gagnon

H. Knight – 00:53	1–0
K. Stack (H. Knight, M. Bozek) – 27:42	2–0
A. Carpenter (A. Schleper) (PP) – 35:59	3–0
	3–1	55:22 – S. Tapani (M. Karvinen) (PP)

4 min
Penalties
8 min
43
Shots
15

10 February 2014; 14:00	United States	9–0 (5–0, 1–0, 3–0)	Switzerland	Shayba Arena, Sochi; Attendance: 3,812

Game reference

Molly Schaus
Goalies
Florence Schelling
Referee:
(Canada) Melanie Bordeleau
Linesmen:
(Canada) Denise Caughey
(France) Charlotte Girard

M. Lamoureux (J. Lamoureux, M. Duggan) – 09:20	1–0
B. Decker (A. Kessel, H. Knight) – 10:07	2–0
A. Kessel (K. Coyne) – 10:15	3–0
H. Knight (K. Stack, J. Chu) – 14:23	4–0
A. Kessel (B. Decker, K. Coyne) (PP) – 15:42	5–0
M. Lamoureux (J. Lamoureux, L. Stecklein) – 33:26	6–0
K. Coyne (K. Stack) – 40:49	7–0
K. Coyne (A. Kessel, M. Bozek) – 43:59	8–0
A. Carpenter (J. Pucci) – 55:39	9–0

4 min
Penalties
8 min
53
Shots
10

12 February 2014; 16:30	Canada	3–2 (0–0, 0–1, 3–1)	United States	Shayba Arena, Sochi; Attendance: 4,812

Game reference

Charline Labonté
Goalies
Jessica Vetter
Referee:
(Finland) Anna Eskola
Linesmen:
(Czech Republic) Ilona Novotná
(Czech Republic) Zuzana Svobodová

	0–1	37:34 – H. Knight (A. Carpenter, A. Schleper) (PP)
M. Agosta-Marciano (H. Wickenheiser) (PP) – 42:24	1–1
H. Wickenheiser (N. Spooner, M. Agosta-Marciano) – 43:54	2–1
M. Agosta-Marciano – 54:55	3–1
	3–2	58:55 – A. Schleper

8 min
Penalties
10 min
31
Shots
27

Semifinals

17 February 2014; 16:30	United States	6–1 (3–0, 2–0, 1–1)	Sweden	Shayba Arena, Sochi; Attendance: 4,542

Game reference

Jessie Vetter
Goalies
Valentina Lizana Wallner
Kim Martin Hasson
Referee:
(Canada) Melanie Bordeleau
Linesmen:
(Canada) Denise Caughey
(Czech Republic) Zuzana Svobodová

A. Carpenter (M. Bozek, K. Stack) (PP) – 06:10	1–0
K. Bellamy (B. Decker, M. Bozek) – 07:16	2–0
A. Kessel (B. Decker, G. Marvin) – 11:19	3–0
M. Lamoureux (J. Lamoureux, K. Bellamy) (PP) – 25:41	4-0
M. Bozek (K. Coyne) – 32:17	5–0
	5–1	53:04 – A. Borgqvist (E. Eliasson, P. Winberg)
B. Decker (K. Coyne, A. Kessel) – 56:58	6–1

6 min
Penalties
8 min
70
Shots
9

Gold medal game

20 February 2014; 21:00	(gold) Canada	3–2 OT (0–0, 0–1, 2–1) (OT 1–0)	United States (silver)	Bolshoy Ice Dome, Sochi; Attendance: 10,639

Game reference

Shannon Szabados
Goalies
Jessie Vetter
Referee:
(United Kingdom) Joy Tottman
Linesmen:
(Czech Republic) Ilona Novotná
(Czech Republic) Zuzana Svobodová

	0–1	31:57 – M. Duggan (J. Lamoureux)
	0–2	42:01 – A. Carpenter (H. Knight, K. Stack)
B. Jenner (M. Mikkelson, J. Larocque) – 56:34	1–2
M-P. Poulin (R. Johnston, H. Irwin) (EA) – 59:05	2–2
M-P. Poulin (L. Fortino) (PP2) – 68:10	3–2

10 min
Penalties
14 min
31
Shots
29

== Luge ==
Based on world rankings between November 1, 2013, and December 31, 2013, the United States qualified 10 athletes.

Men

Athlete	Event	Run 1		Run 2		Run 3		Run 4		Total	
Athlete	Event	Time	Rank	Time	Rank	Time	Rank	Time	Rank	Time	Rank
Aidan Kelly	Singles	53.275	26	53.192	26	52.756	=24	52.576	22	3:31.799	24
Chris Mazdzer	Singles	52.744	10	52.643	12	52.369	17	52.198	10	3:29.954	13
Tucker West	Singles	53.142	21	52.966	23	52.413	18	52.696	25	3:31.217	22

Women

Athlete	Event	Run 1		Run 2		Run 3		Run 4		Total	
Athlete	Event	Time	Rank	Time	Rank	Time	Rank	Time	Rank	Time	Rank
Summer Britcher	Singles	51.222	19	50.930	16	51.082	16	50.909	14	3:24.143	15
Erin Hamlin	Singles	50.356	2	50.276	3	50.165	3	50.348	3	3:21.145	3rd place, bronze medalist(s)
Kate Hansen	Singles	50.794	10	50.581	11	50.793	13	50.499	6	3:22.667	10

Mixed/Open

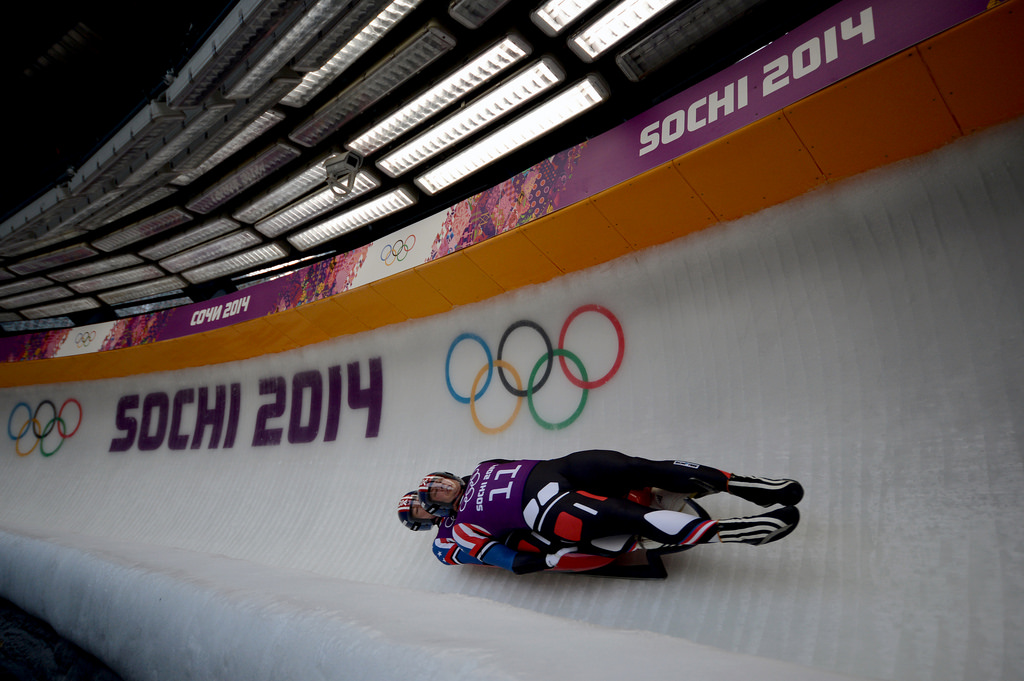
Luge doubles

Athlete	Event	Run 1		Run 2		Run 3		Total	
Athlete	Event	Time	Rank	Time	Rank	Time	Rank	Time	Rank
Preston Griffall; Matthew Mortensen	Doubles	50.637	14	51.066	14	—N/a		1:41.703	14
Christian Niccum; Jayson Terdiman	Doubles	50.354	11	50.591	13	—N/a		1:40.945	11
Erin Hamlin; Chris Mazdzer; Christian Niccum; Jayson Terdiman	Team relay	54.338	2	56.245	6	56.972	7	2:47.555	6

== Nordic combined ==
The United States qualified a total of four athletes and a spot in the team relay. The full Nordic combined team was officially announced on January 22, 2014.

Athlete	Event	Ski jumping			Cross-country		Total	
Athlete	Event	Distance	Points	Rank	Time	Rank	Time	Rank
Bill Demong	Normal hill/10 km	92.5	108.2	=31	24:06.8	21	25:39.8	24
Bryan Fletcher	Normal hill/10 km	90.5	105.6	41	24:01.7	19	25:45.7	26
Taylor Fletcher	Normal hill/10 km	85.5	92.9	46	23:48.9	11	26:22.9	33
Todd Lodwick	Normal hill/10 km	92.5	108.0	34	DNS		DNF	
Bill Demong	Large hill/10 km	116.5	94.5	38	23:23.3	25	25:41.3	31
Bryan Fletcher	Large hill/10 km	121.5	99.3	=27	22:53.3	15	24:52.3	22
Taylor Fletcher	Large hill/10 km	115.5	95.8	35	22:31.6	6	24:44.6	20
Todd Lodwick	Large hill/10 km	126.0	98.8	30	DNS		DNF	
Bill Demong; Bryan Fletcher; Taylor Fletcher; Todd Lodwick	Team large hill/4×5 km	465.5	397.6	8	47:43.1	6	49:35.1	8

== Short track speed skating ==
Based on their performance at World Cup 3 and 4 in November 2013, the United States qualified five men and three women. The members of the team were decided at the US Olympic trials from January 2–5, 2014. Kyle Carr was the fifth man selected to the team, but he did not skate in any individual distances or in the relay.

Men

Athlete	Event	Heat		Quarterfinal		Semifinal		Final	
Athlete	Event	Time	Rank	Time	Rank	Time	Rank	Time	Rank
Eddy Alvarez	500 m	1:15.108	4	Did not advance					31
J. R. Celski	500 m	41.717	2 Q	53.178	2 Q	41.152	4 FB	41.786	6
Jordan Malone	500 m	42.533	4	Did not advance					28
Eddy Alvarez	1000 m	1:26.070	2 Q	1:39.092	3	Did not advance			11
J. R. Celski	1000 m	1:25.428	1 Q	DNF		Did not advance			13
Chris Creveling	1000 m	1:25.069	2 Q	1:24.691	3	Did not advance			10
Eddy Alvarez	1500 m	2:17.532	3 Q	—N/a		DSQ		Did not advance	19
J. R. Celski	1500 m	2:15.675	2 Q	—N/a		2:21.62	1 FA	2:15.624	4
Chris Creveling	1500 m	2:16.553	4	—N/a		Did not advance			21
Eddy Alvarez; J. R. Celski; Chris Creveling; Jordan Malone	5000 m relay	—N/a				6:50.292	4 AA	6:42.371	2nd place, silver medalist(s)

Women

Athlete	Event	Heat		Quarterfinal		Semifinal		Final	
Athlete	Event	Time	Rank	Time	Rank	Time	Rank	Time	Rank
Alyson Dudek	500 m	DSQ		Did not advance					32
Emily Scott	500 m	45.210	2 Q	44.709	3	Did not advance			12
Jessica Smith	500 m	1:13.344	4	Did not advance					30
Emily Scott	1000 m	1:32.585	2 Q	1:30.324	3	Did not advance			11
Jessica Smith	1000 m	1:31.359	2 Q	1:32.088	1 Q	1:30.399	2 FA	1:31.301	4
Alyson Dudek	1500 m	2:27.899	4	—N/a		Did not advance			24
Emily Scott	1500 m	2:22.641	1 Q	—N/a		2:23.439	5 AA	2:39.436	5
Jessica Smith	1500 m	2:26.703	2 Q	—N/a		2:20.259	4 FB	2:25.787	7

Qualification legend: ADV – Advanced due to being impeded by another skater; FA – Qualify to medal round; FB – Qualify to consolation round; AA – Advance to medal round due to being impeded by another skater

== Skeleton ==
The skeleton team was named on January 18, 2014.

Athlete	Event	Run 1		Run 2		Run 3		Run 4		Total	
Athlete	Event	Time	Rank	Time	Rank	Time	Rank	Time	Rank	Time	Rank
Matthew Antoine	Men's	56.89	3	56.95	=5	56.69	4	56.73	6	3:47.26	3rd place, bronze medalist(s)
John Daly	Men's	56.91	4	56.67	3	56.99	8	58.54	20	3:49.11	15
Kyle Tress	Men's	57.85	20	58.13	23	57.76	17	Did not advance		2:53.74	21
Noelle Pikus-Pace	Women's	58.68	3	58.65	2	58.25	3	58.28	4	3:53.86	2nd place, silver medalist(s)
Katie Uhlaender	Women's	58.83	4	58.75	=3	58.41	7	58.35	6	3:54.34	4

== Ski jumping ==
The team was named on January 22, 2014.

Men

Athlete	Event	Qualification			First round			Final			Total	
Athlete	Event	Distance	Points	Rank	Distance	Points	Rank	Distance	Points	Rank	Points	Rank
Nick Alexander	Normal hill	90.0	100.7	40 Q	96.0	116.0	34	Did not advance				
Nick Fairall	Normal hill	80.5	77.3	50	Did not advance							
Peter Frenette	Normal hill	93.0	105.3	35 Q	91.5	107.2	45	Did not advance				
Anders Johnson	Normal hill	92.5	107.9	26 Q	92.0	104.2	47	Did not advance				
Nick Alexander	Large hill	120.0	96.6	30 Q	111.5	87.0	48	Did not advance				
Nick Fairall	Large hill	120.0	95.7	31 Q	119.5	108.3	35	Did not advance				
Peter Frenette	Large hill	111.0	80.3	43	Did not advance							
Anders Johnson	Large hill	112.0	91.1	36 Q	DSQ			Did not advance				
Nick Alexander; Nick Fairall; Peter Frenette; Anders Johnson	Team large hill	—N/a			479.0	402.5	10	Did not advance				

Women

Athlete	Event	First round			Final			Total	
Athlete	Event	Distance	Points	Rank	Distance	Points	Rank	Points	Rank
Sarah Hendrickson	Normal hill	94.0	112.4	19	90.5	105.2	21	217.6	21
Jessica Jerome	Normal hill	97.0	116.3	12	99.0	117.8	10	234.1	10
Lindsey Van	Normal hill	97.0	116.4	11	94.5	110.8	15	227.2	15

== Snowboarding ==
The final members of the freestyle team and the alpine team was named on January 21, 2014. The snowboard cross team was named on January 25, 2014.

Arielle Gold had to pull out of the competition after injuring her shoulder during a practice run and crash at Rosa Khutor Extreme Park, moments before the competition.

Freestyle
Men

Athlete	Event	Qualification				Semifinal				Final			
Athlete	Event	Run 1	Run 2	Best	Rank	Run 1	Run 2	Best	Rank	Run 1	Run 2	Best	Rank
Greg Bretz	Halfpipe	71.75	52.50	71.75	7 QS	83.00	44.25	83.00	2 QF	21.75	26.50	26.50	12
Danny Davis	Halfpipe	92.00	75.75	92.00	3 QF	Bye				53.00	45.25	53.00	10
Taylor Gold	Halfpipe	81.50	87.50	87.50	5 QS	26.00	60.75	60.75	8	Did not advance			
Shaun White	Halfpipe	95.75	70.75	95.75	1 QF	Bye				35.00	90.25	90.25	4
Chas Guldemond	Slopestyle	86.00	19.25	86.00	5 QS	13.25	79.75	79.75	7	Did not advance			
Sage Kotsenburg	Slopestyle	86.50	81.50	86.50	8 QS	89.00	90.50	90.50	2 QF	93.50	83.25	93.50	1st place, gold medalist(s)
Ryan Stassel	Slopestyle	81.00	28.75	81.00	9 QS	83.25	81.75	83.25	6	Did not advance			

Qualification Legend: QF – Qualify directly to final; QS – Qualify to semifinal

Women

Athlete	Event	Qualification				Semifinal				Final			
Athlete	Event	Run 1	Run 2	Best	Rank	Run 1	Run 2	Best	Rank	Run 1	Run 2	Best	Rank
Kelly Clark	Halfpipe	92.25	95.00	95.00	1 QF	Bye				48.25	90.75	90.75	3rd place, bronze medalist(s)
Kaitlyn Farrington	Halfpipe	87.00	34.50	87.00	4 QS	87.50	53.25	87.50	1 QF	85.75	91.75	91.75	1st place, gold medalist(s)
Arielle Gold	Halfpipe	DNS				Did not advance							
Hannah Teter	Halfpipe	90.25	92.00	92.00	2 QF	Bye				90.50	26.75	90.50	4
Jamie Anderson	Slopestyle	93.50	DNS	93.50	2 QF	Bye				80.75	95.25	95.25	1st place, gold medalist(s)
Jessika Jenson	Slopestyle	34.00	58.50	58.50	7 QS	72.00	50.50	72.00	5	Did not advance			
Karly Shorr	Slopestyle	45.00	84.75	84.75	4 QF	Bye				39.00	75.00	75.00	6
Ty Walker	Slopestyle	1.00	DNS	1.00	11 QS	66.00	43.75	66.00	6	Did not advance			

Qualification Legend: QF – Qualify directly to final; QS – Qualify to semifinal

Parallel

Athlete	Event	Qualification		Round of 16	Quarterfinal	Semifinal	Final	
Athlete	Event	Time	Rank	Opposition Time	Opposition Time	Opposition Time	Opposition Time	Rank
Justin Reiter	Men's giant slalom	1:41.25	24	Did not advance				
Justin Reiter	Men's slalom	DSQ		Did not advance				

Snowboard cross
Men

Athlete	Event	Seeding		1/8 final	Quarterfinal	Semifinal	Final	
Athlete	Event	Time	Rank	Position	Position	Position	Position	Rank
Nick Baumgartner	Snowboard cross	CAN		4	Did not advance			=25
Alex Deibold	Snowboard cross	CAN		3 Q	3 Q	3 FA	3	3rd place, bronze medalist(s)
Nate Holland	Snowboard cross	CAN		4	Did not advance			=25
Trevor Jacob	Snowboard cross	CAN		1 Q	2 Q	4 FB	3	9

Qualification legend: FA – Qualify to medal round; FB – Qualify to consolation round

Women

Athlete	Event	Seeding		1/8 final	Quarterfinal	Semifinal	Final	
Athlete	Event	Time	Rank	Position	Position	Position	Position	Rank
Faye Gulini	Snowboard cross	1:23.96	9	—N/a	3 Q	3 FA	4	4
Jacqueline Hernandez	Snowboard cross	DNF	24	—N/a	DNS	Did not advance		=23
Lindsey Jacobellis	Snowboard cross	1:21.40	2	—N/a	1 Q	6 FB	1	7

Qualification legend: FA – Qualify to medal round; FB – Qualify to consolation round

== Speed skating ==
Based on the results from the fall World Cups during the 2013–14 ISU Speed Skating World Cup season, the United States earned start quotas in each distance, and the members of the team were decided following the 2014 U.S. Olympic Long Track Trials from December 27 to January 1. A team of 17 was announced after the trials. This was the first Winter Olympics since 1984 that the American long track speed skating team failed to win an Olympic medal.

Distance
Men

Athlete	Event	Race 1		Race 2		Total	
Athlete	Event	Time	Rank	Time	Rank	Time	Rank
Shani Davis	500 m	35.39	22	35.59	28	1:10.98	24
Tucker Fredricks	500 m	35.27	=18	35.72	37	1:10.99	26
Brian Hansen	500 m	35.65	33	DNS		DNF	
Mitchell Whitmore	500 m	35.34	20	35.71	35	1:11.06	27
Shani Davis	1000 m	—N/a				1:09.12	8
Jonathan Garcia	1000 m	—N/a				1:10.74	28
Brian Hansen	1000 m	—N/a				1:09.21	9
Joey Mantia	1000 m	—N/a				1:09.72	15
Shani Davis	1500 m	—N/a				1:45.98	11
Jonathan Kuck	1500 m	—N/a				1:50.19	37
Brian Hansen	1500 m	—N/a				1:45.59	7
Joey Mantia	1500 m	—N/a				1:48.01	22
Jonathan Kuck	5000 m	—N/a				6:31.53	19
Emery Lehman	5000 m	—N/a				6:29.94	16
Patrick Meek	5000 m	—N/a				6:32.94	20
Emery Lehman	10000 m	—N/a				13:28.67	10
Patrick Meek	10000 m	—N/a				13:28.72	11

Women

Athlete	Event	Race 1		Race 2		Total	
Athlete	Event	Time	Rank	Time	Rank	Time	Rank
Brittany Bowe	500 m	38.81	17	38.37	10	1:17.19	13
Lauren Cholewinski	500 m	38.54	12	38.80	=19	1:17.35	15
Heather Richardson	500 m	37.73	4	38.02	8	1:15.75	8
Sugar Todd	500 m	39.28	28	39.25	=27	1:18.53	29
Brittany Bowe	1000 m	—N/a				1:15.47	8
Kelly Gunther	1000 m	—N/a				1:19.43	33
Heather Richardson	1000 m	—N/a				1:15.23	7
Sugar Todd	1000 m	—N/a				1:19.13	32
Brittany Bowe	1500 m	—N/a				1:58.31	14
Heather Richardson	1500 m	—N/a				1:57.60	7
Jilleanne Rookard	1500 m	—N/a				1:59.15	18
Anna Ringsred	3000 m	—N/a				4:21.51	26
Jilleanne Rookard	3000 m	—N/a				4:10.02	10
Maria Lamb	5000 m	—N/a				7:29.64	16

Team pursuit

Athlete	Event	Quarterfinal	Semifinal	Final	
Athlete	Event	Opposition Time	Opposition Time	Opposition Time	Rank
Shani Davis; Brian Hansen; Jonathan Kuck; Joey Mantia	Men's team pursuit	Canada; L 3:46.82	Did not advance	Final D France; W 3:46.50	7
Brittany Bowe; Kelly Gunther; Heather Richardson; Jilleanne Rookard	Women's team pursuit	Netherlands; L 3:02.21	Did not advance	Final C Canada; L 3:03.77	6

== See also ==
- United States at the 2014 Winter Paralympics
- United States at the 2014 Summer Youth Olympics
