= Ngawang Tashi Bapu =

Tibetan Lama

Ngawang Tashi Bapu (Lama Tashi)
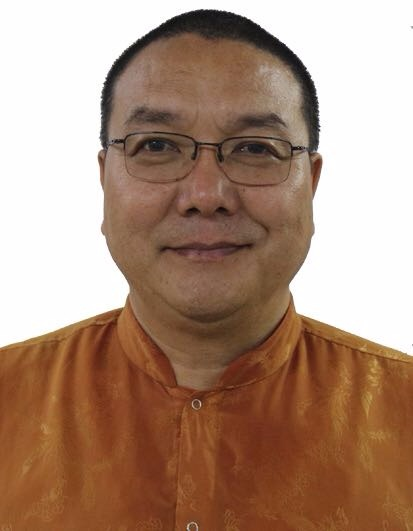
- Born: 22 February 1968 (age 58); Thembang, West Kameng, North-East Frontier Agency, India
- Education: Geshe
- Alma mater: Drepung Loseling Institute, Karnataka, India
- Years active: 1968 – Present
- Known for: Buddhist chant, Overtone singing
- Awards: Nominee Grammy Award for Best Traditional World Music Album 2006
- Lama Tashi's Voice Lama Tashi's response on his Grammy Award Nomination

Geshe Ngawang Tashi Bapu a.k.a. Lama Tashi (born 22 February 1968 in Thembang village of West Kameng in Arunachal Pradesh, India) is former Principal Chant Master of Drepung Loseling Monastery, one of the largest monasteries of the Dalai Lama. In 2006, Lama Tashi was nominated for the Grammy Award for his album "Tibetan Master Chants" in the "Best Traditional World Music". Through this achievement, he has created the record of the first Buddhist Monk for Grammy Nomination in solo performance, and the first North-East Indian to be nominated for the prestigious Grammy Award (sometimes called Oscar of Music) the highest honour of Music in the world. Lama Tashi led Long Life Puja Chanting for the 14th Dalai Lama, the HE 99th and 100th Gaden Tripa Rinpoches and many more highly revered masters. The Long Life Puja is a very popular traditional healing ceremony that involves a multiphonic chant performance to heal the listeners and increase their life span. Lama Tashi also led the chanting performance of the Traditional Great Prayer Festival at Bodh Gaya presided over by the 14th Dalai Lama in 2002. Lama Tashi served as the Principal and the Director of the Central Institute of Himalayan Culture Studies, Dahung, India from 2003 to 2012 and 2012-2018 respectively. While at the institute, he taught Buddhist Philosophy at University level students.

== Education ==
At the age of 15, Lama Tashi joined The Bomdila Monastery for Buddhist study. Later, he joined Drepung Loseling Monastery to achieve Geshe Lharampa degree - a degree equivalent to Ph.D in modern academia.

== International Tours & Performances ==
While studying the Buddhist Philosophy and Sacred Chant, Lama Tashi was selected by the Drepung Loseling Monastery to be on "Sacred Music and Sacred Dance for Planetary Healing" and "The Mystical of Tibet Tour" in U.S.A., Canada, Mexico and many other countries where he has shared stage with many well known artists like Michael Stipe of R.E.M, Sheryl Crow, Patti Smith, Philips Glass, Gilberto Gil of Brazil and many others performed in the Carnegie Hall, Lincoln Center and Central Park in New York and Hollywood Bowl in California and National Mall at Washington D.C., USA, Auditorium of Rome, Rome and Teatro Massimo, Sicily, Italy, Esplanade, Singapore and City Hall, Hong Kong etc. During his international tours, he has taught, performed and recorded the multiphonic chants both independently ("THE LOST CORD", "CHANT MASTERS", "MEDICINE BUDDHA" and the "TIBETAN MASTER CHANTS") and with the monks of Drepung Loseling Monastery ("SACRED TIBETAN CHANTS", "SOUND OF VOID", "SACRED MUSIC AND SACRED DANCE" and the "COMPASSION"). Besides performing the multiphonic chants at several international stages, Lama Tashi has also given his services as a resource person and expert in several sound healing events produced and hosted by Jonathan Goldman at Sunrise Ranch Spiritual Retreat Center in Loveland, Colorado, U.S.A. Most of his recordings are focused either on mental healing or physical healing through sound healing and multiphonic chant.

== Siddhartha Foundation ==
To preserve and invigorate the Tibetan Buddhist culture, Lama Tashi has founded a charitable organisation: Siddhartha Foundation, whose vision incorporates a number of different programs to benefit humanity including: Siddhartha Culture Center, Siddhartha Sponsorship Program, Siddhartha Health Service and Siddhartha Home for the Elderly.

== Heal My Life Meditation App ==
Lama Tashi is a mentor of the Heal My Life Meditation App founded by a Faridabad-based Sr. Hypnotherapist, Tarun Bhatia, to help people practice self-healing breathing exercises and provide powerful affirmations for various life goals which can be recorded in the MP3 format and listened subliminally alongside the multiphonic chants and guided meditation of Lama Tashi for their mental and physical healing.

== Discography of Lama Tashi ==
In 1997, Lama Tashi lent his voice in the soundtrack of Brad Pitt's biographical war drama film: Seven Years in Tibet. In 2004, he released his first music album: Tibetan Master Chants, for which, he won a Grammy Award Nomination in 2006 under the "Best Traditional World Music Album" category. The CD of the album was produced and recorded by Healing Sounds pioneer, Jonathan Goldman under the Spirit Music label.

Track List of Tibetan Master Chants by Lama Tashi
| S. No. | Track name | Duration | Genre | Style | Label |
|---|---|---|---|---|---|
| 1. | Setting Motivation | 0:41 | Folk, World, & Country | Religious, Overtone Singing | Spirit Music |
| 2. | Mantra Of Blessing | 6:21 | Folk, World, & Country | Religious, Overtone Singing | Spirit Music |
| 3. | Guru Rinpoche | 5:34 | Folk, World, & Country | Religious, Overtone Singing | Spirit Music |
| 4. | Heart Sutra | 5:35 | Folk, World, & Country | Religious, Overtone Singing | Spirit Music |
| 5. | Avalokitesvara | 4:59 | Folk, World, & Country | Religious, Overtone Singing | Spirit Music |
| 6. | Manjushri | 5:20 | Folk, World, & Country | Religious, Overtone Singing | Spirit Music |
| 7. | Vajrapani | 5:47 | Folk, World, & Country | Religious, Overtone Singing | Spirit Music |
| 8. | Buddha Amitayus | 5:47 | Folk, World, & Country | Religious, Overtone Singing | Spirit Music |
| 9. | Buddha Ushnisha Vijaya | 5:10 | Folk, World, & Country | Religious, Overtone Singing | Spirit Music |
| 10. | Tara | 5:50 | Folk, World, & Country | Religious, Overtone Singing | Spirit Music |
| 11. | Medicine Buddha | 5:30 | Folk, World, & Country | Religious, Overtone Singing | Spirit Music |
| 12. | Dedication Prayer | 0:45 | Folk, World, & Country | Religious, Overtone Singing | Spirit Music |
