= Skeleton at the 2014 Winter Olympics – Qualification =

The following is about the qualification rules and the quota allocation for the skeleton at the 2014 Winter Olympics.

== Qualification rules ==
A total of 50 quota spots are available to athletes to compete at the games. A maximum 30 men and 20 women may qualify. The qualification is based on the world rankings of January 20, 2014. Athletes must compete in five different races on three different tracks during the 2012/13 season or 2013/14 season. Male athletes must be in the top 60 of the world rankings, while women need to be in the top 45. Each continent (Africa, Americas, Asia, Europe and Oceania) and the hosts are allowed to enter a sled provided they meet the above standard.

== Qualification timeline ==
Races from October 1, 2013, until January 19 will apply to qualification for the Olympics. In general this means that the Olympic field is established by using the first seven world cup races of the 2013-14 season, but also includes results from intercontinental, Europe, and America cup races. Unused or reallocated spots will be filled by January 27, 2014.

== Quota allocation ==
The following summary is not indicative of assurance of Olympic qualification, but of how the allocations would be represented based on the current FIBT rankings. All tables updated to the end of all competitions on January 18, 2014.

=== Current summary ===
Nations	Men	Women	Athletes
Australia	1	2	3
Austria	2	1	3
Canada	2	2	4
Germany	2	3	5
Great Britain	2	2	4
Greece	1		1
Ireland	1		1
Italy	1		1
Japan	2	1	3
Latvia	2	1	3
New Zealand	1	1	2
Romania	1	1	2
Russia	3	3	6
South Korea	2		2
Spain	1		1
Switzerland		1	1
United States	3	2	5
Total: 17 NOCs	27	20	47

=== Men ===
Current ranking by nation as of January 18 (7 of 7 races) The FIBT has not released official qualification results and the below is based on world rankings and team announcements from the various countries.

Sleds qualified	Athletes total	Rank of applicable sled
3	6	United States 11; ~~Germany 15~~; Russia 19
2	14	Latvia 3 Germany 6^{1} Canada 12; Great Britain 14; Austria 17; Japan 28; South Korea 37
1	7	Ireland 27; ~~Switzerland 32~~^{2} Italy 33; Greece 35; Australia 38; New Zealand 39; Spain 43; Romania 50; ~~Slovenia 56~~^{2}
30	~~30~~ 27^{3}	15 NOC's

1. Germany qualified three sleds, but elected to send only two.
2. Slovenia and Switzerland each qualified a single sled, but elected to not enter their athletes.
3. No other athlete met the qualification standard of being in the top 60 sleds in the world ranking.

=== Women ===
Current ranking by nation as of January 17 (7 of 7 races). The FIBT has not released official qualification results and the below is based on world rankings and team announcements from the various countries.

Sleds qualified	Athletes total	Rank of applicable sled
3	6	Russia 10; Germany 11
2	8	Great Britain 3 Canada 15; Australia 17; United States 18
1	6	Austria 4 Switzerland 8 New Zealand 13; Latvia 27; Japan 30; ~~Netherlands 39~~^{1} Romania 41
20	20	12

1. Netherlands qualified a single sled, but elected to not enter their athlete.
