= Irving B. Goldman =

American plastic surgeon (1898–1975)

Irving B. Goldman (1898–1975) was an American otolaryngologist and plastic surgeon. Dr. Goldman created and taught a popular rhinoplasty course at Mount Sinai Hospital (New York). The course focus was the "Goldman Tip," a rhinoplasty technique that is still popular with surgeons today. He was the first president of the American Academy of Facial Plastic and Reconstructive Surgery, 1964.

== Personal life ==
Irving B. Goldman was born on June 29, 1898 in New York, New York. Dr. Goldman received a PhD in 1920 from Yale University, New Haven, Connecticut. In 1924 he earned his MD from Tufts University, Medford, Massachusetts. He interned at Mountainside Hospital, Glen Ridge, New Jersey and Mount Sinai Hospital (New York)

Maclyn Goldman, New Jersey State Senator from 1966 to 1968, is his brother.

Jonathan Goldman is Dr. Goldman’s son.

Lynn Mason-Pattnosh, owner and host of The Concierge Questionnaire, is Dr. Goldman’s granddaughter.

== Career ==
Goldman went to Europe to study rhinoplasty surgery and was one of the first surgeons to become well known for the procedure in the United States. In the 1930s and 1940s it was very difficult to obtain permission to perform rhinoplasty surgery in the United States of America. Goldman gained favor with the chief of medicine at Mount Sinai Hospital (New York) by performing two successful operations on the chief's daughters.

After the success of these procedures, Goldman's practice flourished. His practice included patients from the most affluent members of New York society and the New York City show business industry, including Dean Martin, Lee Remick, the Andrews Sisters, and Frank Sinatra for multiple throat issues.
