= Russell Currier =

American biathlete (born 1987)

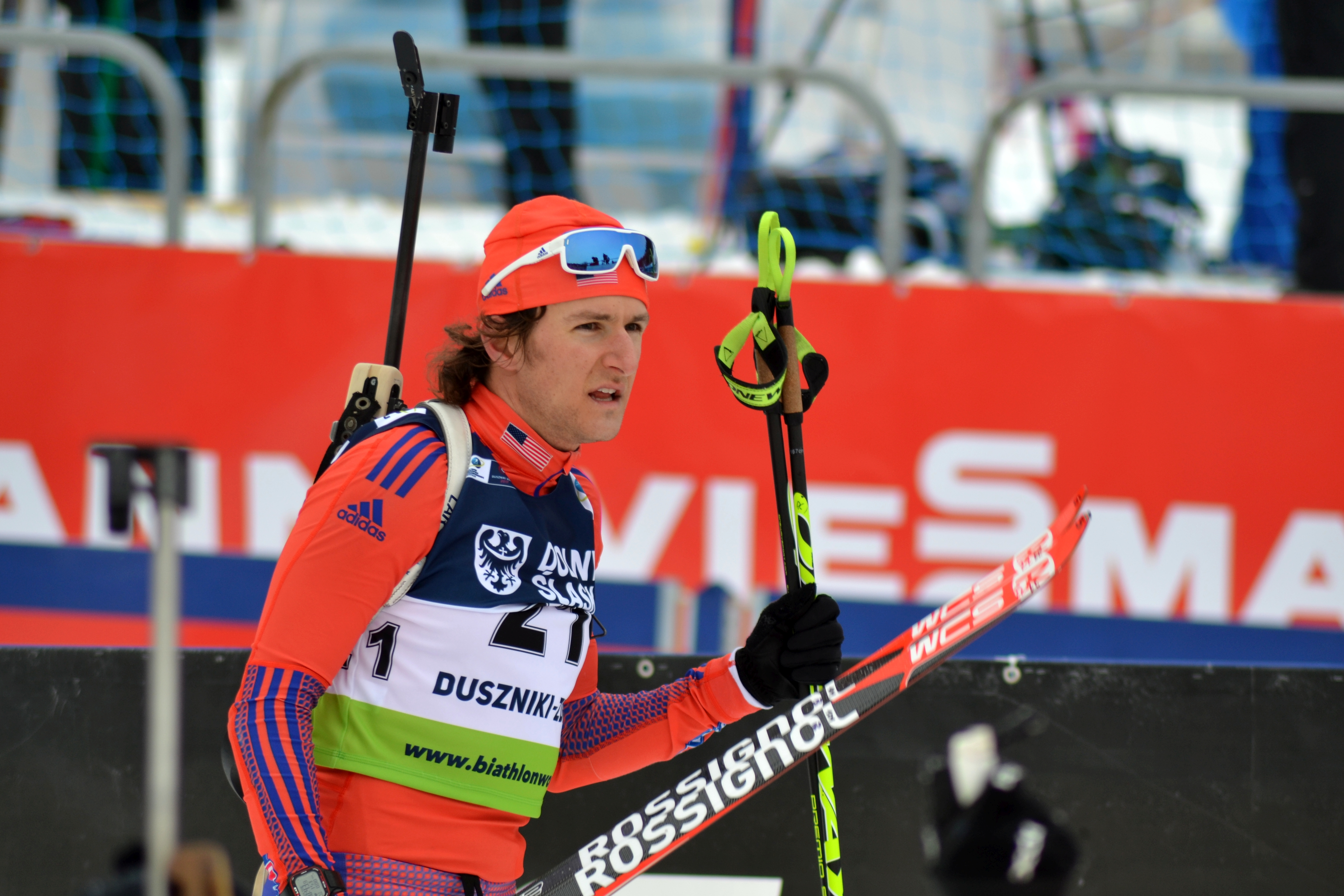
Russell Currier at the European Championships 2017

Russell Currier (born June 26, 1987) is a retired American biathlete.

Born in Stockholm, Maine, he competed for United States at the 2014 Winter Olympics in Sochi.
