= The Concierge Questionnaire =

Online travel magazine

The Concierge Questionnaire is an online travel magazine, launched in 2009, featuring locals with “travel answers from those who know," and inspired by the Proust Questionnaire.

Since April 2011, Chantal Westerman, former Entertainment Editor and Hollywood Correspondent of ABC's Good Morning America (GMA), has been hosting ConciergeQ Conversations with Chantal Westerman. ConciergeQ Conversations with Chantal Westerman are in-depth interviews with guests who are also featured on The Concierge Questionnaire. Ms. Westerman's first featured guests were Fort Worth Opera and The Thrilling Adventure Hour.

== Contributors ==
Frequent contributors to The Concierge Questionnaire include: Richard Bangs and Mary Ann Davidson. Other ConciergeQ URHereTravel coverage hosts include: Tasha Dwhaj, Lynn Mason-Pattnosh, and Sierra Mercier. Lynn Mason-Pattnosh is also ConciergeQ's Executive Producer. ConciergeQ was a Top 100 Brand and Influencer for the Rio 2016 Olympics, per Onalytica.

== URHere Travel ==
The Concierge Questionnaire launched URHere Travel, focusing on event and festival coverage, in March 2012. The launch included the first video interview of ConciergeQ Conversations with Chantal Westerman. Ms. Westerman's guest was filmmaker Heather Rae - 2008 Independent Spirit Award Producer of the Year.

Maria Prekeges hosts ConciergeQ's URHere Travel food, wine and spirits coverage. Her celebrity interviews have included Brent Ridge and Josh Kilmer-Purcell of The Fabulous Beekman Boys, and Chef John Tesar of Top Chef (season 10).

== Celebrity Questionnaires ==
The following celebrities questionnaires are featured on The Concierge Questionnaire magazine.

- Adam West
- AM (musician)
- America Olivo
- Andy Grammer
- Angela Ruggiero
- Angela Sun
- Apolo Anton Ohno
- Arthur Frommer
- Ashley Wagner
- Bill Cosby
- Babatunde Osotimehin
- Brian Hansen (speed skater)
- Callan McAuliffe
- Catherine Chalmers
- Chris Creveling
- Christian Campbell
- Christian Hosoi
- Colm Wilkinson
- Curt Tomasevicz
- Daniel Junge
- Deborah Gibson
- Dotsie Bausch
- Elisabeth Röhm
- Georgia Gould
- Gerry McCambridge
- Hà Phương
- Hannah Kearney
- Heather Rae
- Jamie Lee Curtis
- Jessy J
- Jill Bolte Taylor
- Jean-Paul 'Bluey' Maunick
- Jim McGorman
- Joe Manganiello
- Joyce DiDonato
- Kellie Wells (athlete)
- Khatuna Lorig
- Larry Gatlin
- Laura Jansen
- Lauryn Williams
- Lil Jon
- Lukas Nelson & Promise of the Real
- The McClymonts
- Maëlle Ricker
- Mando Diao
- Mariel Hemingway
- The Material
- Mehmet Ferda
- Melba Moore
- Michael Franks (musician)
- Mike Riddle
- Múm
- Natalie Gelman
- Nik Wallenda
- Pam Tillis
- Petronel Malan
- Reckless Kelly (band)
- Reema Khan
- Reese Hoffa
- Rex Pickett
- Richard Bangs
- Richard Dreyfuss
- Rider Strong
- Robert Scoble
- Ronee Blakley
- Sally Shapiro
- Sarah Rafferty
- Shawn Lee
- Silvena Rowe
- Tara Platt
- Tippi Hedren
- Willie Garson
- Yahya Abdul-Mateen
- Young The Giant
- Yuri Lowenthal

== Awards ==
- 2012 Idaho Press Club Award - 1st Place Website — General Excellence — Online Only
- 2012 Idaho Press Club Award - 1st Place Best Online Only Program — General - "Sun Valley Film Festival Kickoff Party-The Modern Hotel"
