= Kyle Carr =

American short track speed skater

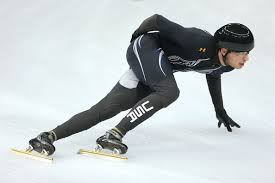

Personal information
- Born: September 15, 1986 (age 39) Hunterdon County, New Jersey, U.S.
- Height: 5 ft 10 in (178 cm)
- Weight: 174 lb (79 kg)
- Website: www.kylecarr.com

Sport
- Country: United States
- Sport: Short track speed skating
- Coached by: Stephen Gough
Medal record
Men's short track speed skating
Representing United States
World Championships
Bronze medal – third place	2011 Sheffield	Men's relay

Christopher Kyle Carr (born September 15, 1986) is an American short track speed skater who has qualified for the 2014 Winter Olympics. The son of a nationally ranked skater, Carr grew up roller skating. In 2001, he switched from inline speed skating to short track. While still in high school, he moved to Marquette, Michigan, to further his training.

Carr made the 2005 Junior World Championships, and the senior World Cup team for the 2005–06 season. He broke his ankle at the 2006 Junior World Team trials and missed the 2006 Olympic Trials. Following surgery and rehab, he returned to skating but found he had lost much of his speed. After several tough years, he made the 2009–10 World Cup Team. Carr made his first World Championships in the spring, but missed the 2010 Olympics by a hundredth of a second. He had been planning to retire after the season, but decided to give himself another four years to fulfill his Olympic dream.

Carr made the World Cup team every year from 2010–13 and helped the United States set the national relay record. In 2011, he won a bronze at the World Championships as part of the relay team. Carr finished fourth overall at the Olympic Trials, qualifying for the 2014 Olympics in Sochi, Russia. He plans to retire after the games and finish his degree in exercise science.

== Early life ==
Christopher Kyle Carr was born September 15, 1986, in Hunterdon County, New Jersey, to mother Lisa (née Godown, now Cervantes) and father Chris. Kyle Carr's mother was a nationally ranked skater. His grandfather, George Carr, worked at the Frenchtown Roller Rink for 30 years where Kyle and future Olympic teammate Chris Creveling spent much of their early roller skating careers.

Carr began skating at age one. At age three, he had his first roller skating competition, and at age seven he boldly told his mother that he was going to make the Olympics. At age thirteen, he broke his wrist while inline skating. Shortly thereafter, coach Shawn Walb introduced Carr to ice short track speed skating. Carr fell in love with the new sport and gave up inline skating in 2001. After his junior year of high school at Governor Mifflin, he moved to Marquette, Michigan, in 2004 to further his training at the US Olympic Education Center.

== Skating career ==
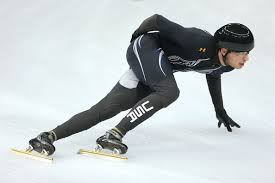
Kyle Carr competing as a short track skater.

Carr participated in the 2005 Junior World Championships. In the fall, he made the senior World Cup team, and won a gold medal in Slovakia. However, Carr broke his ankle at the 2006 Junior World Team trials and was unable to compete at the 2006 Olympic Trials. He moved to Peachtree City, Georgia, where his mother was living, for surgery and rehabilitation. After two surgeries and eight months of rehab, he was ready to return to the ice. When he did, he found he was a considerably slower skater and considered quitting. His high school sweetheart, Siobhan O'Rourke, moved to Marquette and Carr's career turned around thanks to her support.

Carr made the 2009–10 United States World Cup Team, but with O'Rourke graduating from college in 2010, Carr was planning to give up speed skating and "become an adult" at the end of the season. He placed third in the 500 meters at the National Championships, qualified for his first World Championships, and was offered the opportunity to train full-time with the National Team. He and O'Rourke moved to Salt Lake City to give Carr's Olympic dream one last shot. Carr missed the 2010 Olympic team by a hundredth of a second. In 2011, he won a bronze medal at the World Championship as part of the US relay team. In 2012, he placed third in the men's time trial and the National Championships. Carr has made the World Cup team each year from 2010–13; he has won six World Cup medals in total – one gold, two silver, and two bronze, all for relay events.

At the 2014 Olympic Trials, Carr made the 500 meter finals after winning his semifinal. He finished fourth in the event, and followed in up with a fifth-place finish in the 1500. On the final day of the Trials, he fell in the semifinals of the 1000 meters and was disqualified. Frustrated, he approached his coach who informed him that the fall did not matter as Carr already had enough points to make the United States' Olympic Team. "At that point, all that frustration and anxiety turned into happiness and gratitude", Carr recalled. Carr finished fourth overall and is expected to compete in the men's relay at the Olympics. Thanks to the anonymous donation of an Atlanta-area businessman through GoFundMe, Carr will be joined in Sochi, Russia, site of the 2014 Olympic games, by his mother. Previously, Carr, like many of his teammates, used the crowd funding website to help cover his living expenses.

Carr is coached by national coach Stephen Gough, as well as his club coaches: Anthony Barthell and Alex Izykowski. Carr plans to retire after the Olympics. "I'm at an age now where I kind of want to progress with my life", he said. "I'd love to speedskate forever, but it doesn't pay the bills." After retiring, he plans to finish his degree in exercise science and work with elite athletes on their training regimens.

As of 2014, Carr is part of the team that holds the national record in the 3000 meter relay.

== Personal life ==
Carr is engaged to longtime girlfriend Siobhan O'Rourke. The wedding date was originally set for September 5, 2014, but was moved to September 19 so that Carr's teammate and best friend J.R. Celski could attend. Carr has a younger sister, Bethany Camp.

Carr has a pet dog, cat, and bunny. In his free time, he likes to play basketball and ride his bike. He enjoys music with a strong beat, including hip hop and techno. During the off-season, Carr works in commercial real estate. He has volunteered with Operation Christmas Child and has participated in National Multiple Sclerosis Society fundraisers. Carr lists basketball player LeBron James as the greatest influence on his life because of the adversity James overcame to win multiple NBA Championships.
