= Thembang =

Village in West Kameng, Arunachal Pradesh, India

Coordinates: 27°21′N 92°24′E

Thembang is an ancient village with high historical and cultural significance situated in West Kameng district of Arunachal Pradesh, India.

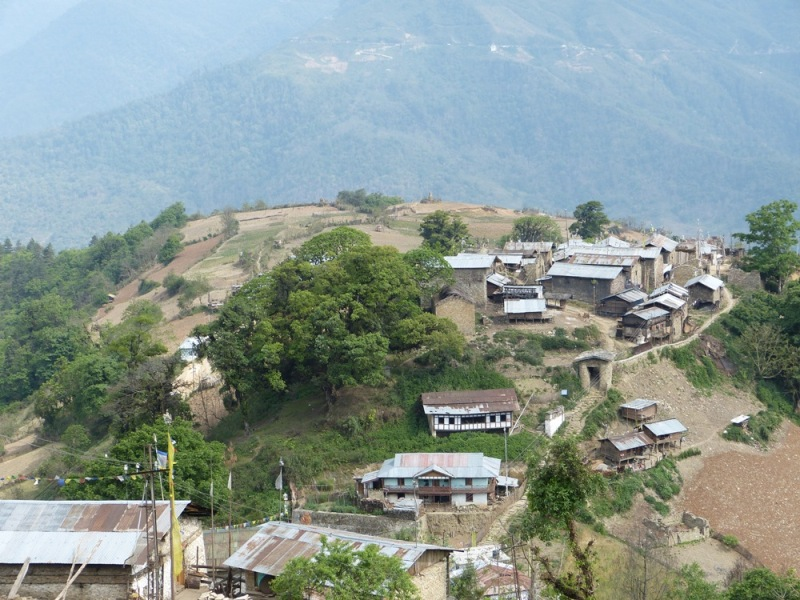
Thembang aerial view

== History ==
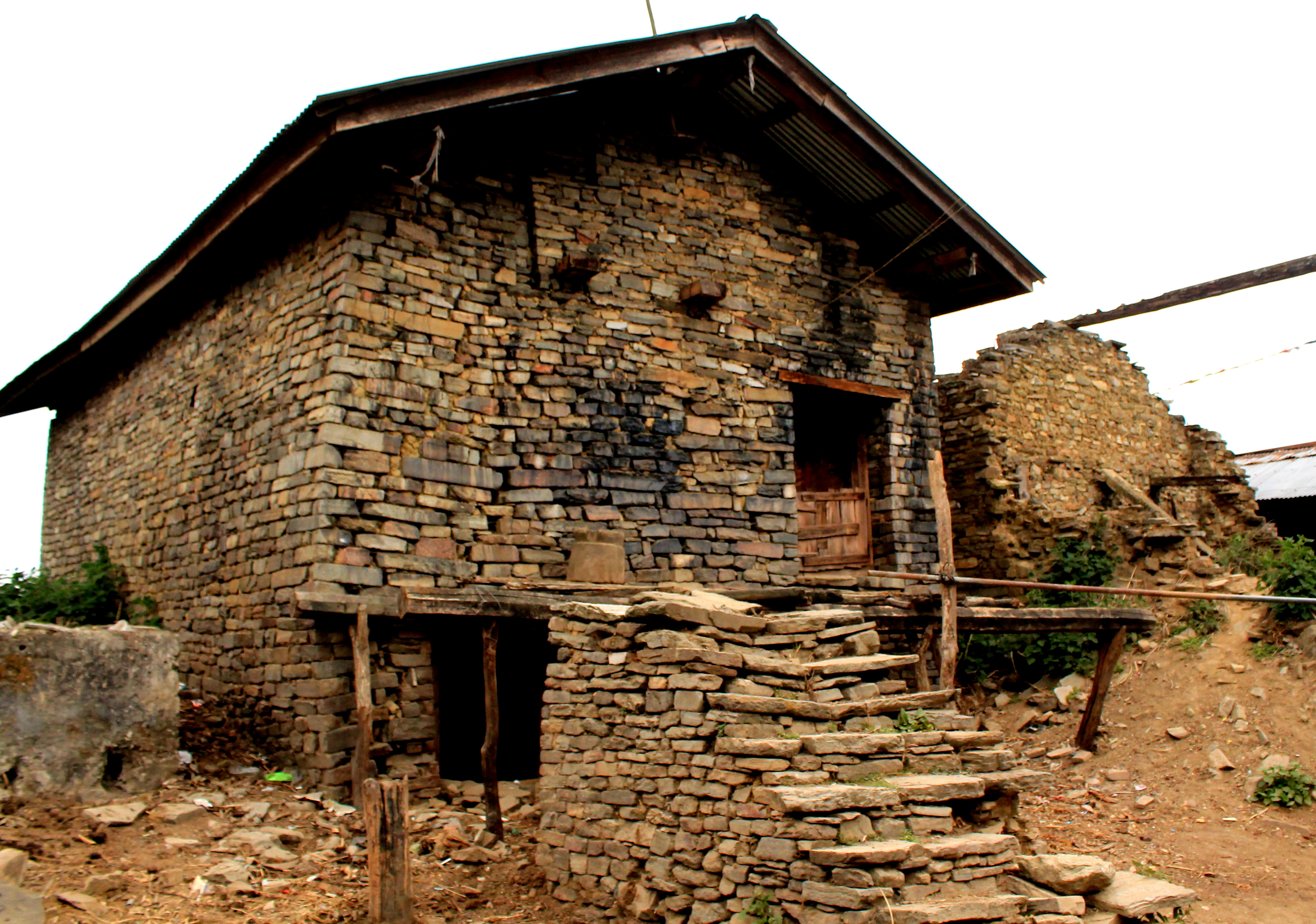
Thembang dzong

Thembang is an ancient village, which was said to be established before first century AD. The village is considered as the most ancient village in the region and earlier the village was known as Yuchho-Pema-Chen, which means Lotus like village. It is believed that the village was settled in Sat-Tsi river valley situated behind the present location about 10 km away. Because of an epidemic, nearly 90-nine percent of the villagers died and then the closing villagers moved to the existing vicinity, that is at the altitude of 2300 above MSL.

It was said that Thembang was ruled by an extremely powerful king by name Cha-Cha-Nye, who according to the legend believed to have descended from up above the sky. In the king's rule, taxes were collected from various areas including some parts of Bodo area in the present Darrang District of Assam namely Mishamari, Udalguri, and Mazbat. After many generations in the same lineage once there remained two brother, Nyila and Yonpu. When the two princes took over the throne as the tradition has to continue, they faced a severe difficulty. They did not know Bodo language. Therefore, it was decided that their uncle would do the tax collection work for them. Everything was going well but good time does not last forever. Some enemy of their uncle manipulated them into believing them that their uncle is not honest in his work. Even though they believed in their uncle's honesty, they got fooled and killed their uncle. Confused and angered, the uncle said that they will die in doubt as well just like him. The next year came and the same problem rose before them. This time, it was decided that they will do the collection. They reached the Bodo land and collected the tax as before, the various items were placed in front of them but they could not find thread in there as before so they asked the villagers for it, but the people there could not understand them. The princes could not understand what to do. Therefore, one of the brothers took out his swords and began making patterns on earth for the Bodos to understand. The Bodos, in confusion, thought that the princes were casting black magic on them so in disparity villagers were gathered and killed both the brother at night while they were sleeping.

After the death of Nyila and Yonpu, the Bodo area faced many mishaps, severe drought flood followed by epidemic, famine, and other calamities. In the end, all the villagers, immensely, worriedly, went to a sage, told him of their cause of trouble, and asked him for a solution. The sage told them that they have committed the greatest sin of killing the sons of God himself and all this is happening because their blood smeared on their hands and the only way to remorse their mistake is to build statues of the kings and preserve them lifelong. Abiding by his advice, villagers started building the statues. However, whenever they left the statues to take a break, they would come back to find their half-done statues completely damaged, thus, starting it all over again. If they came the next day, the construction materials went missing. Therefore, one day they told a girl with a baby to look after the statues when they were away. When they left, the girl saw two white pigeons come from the sky and completed the statues.

Baffled, the girl asked them who they are. The pigeons answered, “When the villagers come back, don’t tell them we completed these, just tell them that big statue is of Nyila and the smaller one is of Yonpu.” “What if they insist?” the girl asked. “Then tell them to bring a small amount of every food items that are found in the area and when they do, eat it and feed your baby. After that, you can tell them”.

After the pigeons left and Bodos returned, they asked the girl how the statues were complete. The girl told them whose statues were those but refused to say anything else. After much insisting, the girl told them to bring a small portion of all the food in the village. The villagers did as were told. After eating and feeding her baby, the girl told them what had happened. However, after uttering the last word, she along with her baby coughed blood and died. Thus the soul of Cha-Cha-Nye was finally calmed. The statues are still present in Kuli-bong-khai village in Mazbat town in Assam but any member of the Bapu clan is forbidden to see them. It is said that the member who defies this myth will face a very painful fate.

Back in Thembang, after the death of Nyila and Yonpu, the people needed royal blood as their ruler, so, they stole the fourth and youngest son of the king of Tibet. The king was named Wangma-Pele-Dhar, he was a grandson of the emperor of Tibet (of Potola Palace) known as Sadnalegs, direct descendant of the emperor Songtsen Gampo.

After his death, his son was made the king. Like the cha cha-nye, when he went to collect taxes from Darrang district of Assam, the villagers refused to acknowledge him. The matter was handed into the hands of Darrang king. When the king was presented before the king, he said, “I am the king of Thembang, son of Wangmo-Pele-dar holding the throne of Nyila and Yonpu and I am rightfully here to collect the tax.” The king of Darrang said that he would allow villager to give him tax with a challenge. The challenge was that the king of Thembang would receive as much tax as he could lift. Surprisingly, he was able to lift as much weight as 18 people would. The king of Darrang was very impressed, and out of honor, he named him ‘Bapu' which could be 'Babu' of the official language of Darrang. After that, all descendants of him are called Bapu. His territory was from Grangthang Chhujub which starts from present Sela Past to Bood-Jerigaon from where he used to collect tax every year apart from the some part of land in Bodo area of Assam.

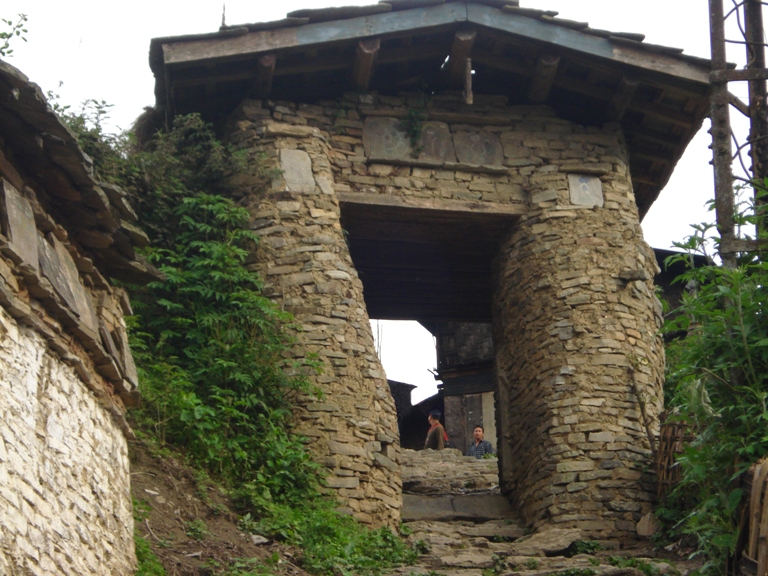
Northern gate of Thembang fort

In Thembang, an immense fort was built following traditional architecture by the villagers of Bhud, Khawna, Rahung, and Khotam who were under the sovereignty of Bapus of Thembang during that time. Two gates were built on North and on South, the former were used for entry and the latter were used for exit. When the dawn came about, there was loud shouting to the people to get inside the fort gates after which they were closed. This was for the protection of the people.

Every evening, loud shout warnings were given near these gates after which they were closed. Large stone slabs were kept on top of the wall of the fort which would fall on any intruder who would try to climb it up. During night time, the young warriors equipped with swords, spears, bows and arrows used to guard the entire fort.

Many wars were fought in Thembang, but one of the major ones was the war between Bapus and Miji tribes of Deojing (present Rurang). Aibi Tchandangpu was leading the war and he was very powerful. During that war all the Bapus had fled to other places. Two brothers of a Bapu clan stayed back to fight with the intruders. After a long fight the war was about to end with Bapus defeat, but there was a broken arrow dipped in poison inside one of the quivers which the younger brother took and hit him at his breast killing him instantly.

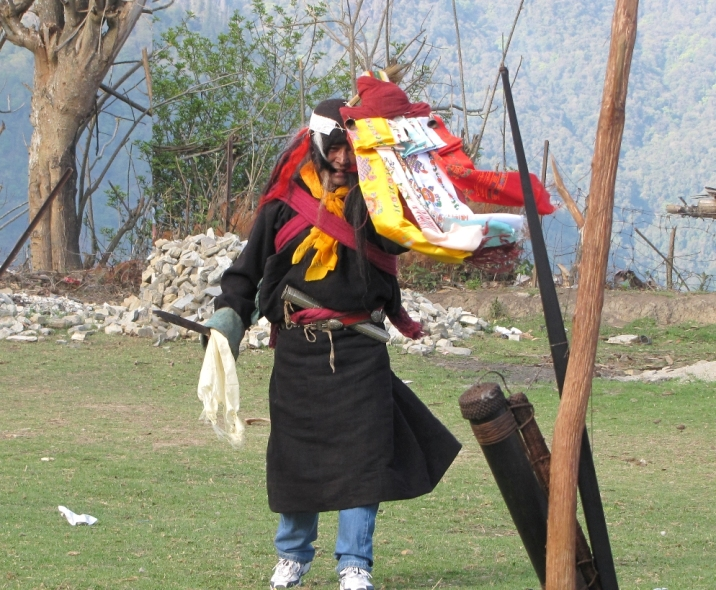
Ceremonial war

Another war was with Tukpenpa (Rupa). Pemajaipu was the general of Tukpen (Rupa) who was killed by a small boy of Thembang and his head was bought and buried under the stairs of the northern gate. It is the custom to spit on that spot whenever anybody enters the village.

In 1913, Lt. Col. FM Bailey and Capt. H T Morshead of the Survey of British India have stayed here in the fort while coming down from Tibet during the “Tsangpo Exploration” thus the route which passes through Thembang is known as “Bailey Trail”. Many British officers stayed in Thembang including H W Tilman in 1938.

During the Sino-Indian war in 1962, the village has also witnessed a fierce battle between the Indian and Chinese army. A huge Chinese army had come down through the Bailey Trail to Thembang and went directly to Bomdila encircling a large numbers of Indian army between Bomdila and Sela Pass. The village was destroyed completely as it became a war field between the two armies. Artillery were shell on this village from opposite hilltop near present Bomdila by Indian army on Chinese soldier as they have captured and camped the village. The villagers ran away to plains of Assam leaving everything scattered. The village was reconstructed after the end of war. One can still find the war bunkers constructed by the Indian Armed forces around the village. A war memorial to commemorate the soldiers who died in the war has been recently constructed near the village.

During another time, a fire spread out inside the fort in which most of the houses were burnt down and many things were also burnt as a result some villagers have decided to construct house outside the fort.

There are many villages in the nearby areas under the jurisdiction of Thembang. These are Gonthung, Pangma, Semnak, Cherong, Tangchhenmu, Lagam, Chanther, and Lachong. Most villages such as Gonthung, Pangma, Semnak, Cherong, Tangchhenmu are occupied by people migrated from Thembang whereas the villages such as Lagam, Chanther, and Lachong are occupied by migrants from other region who pay taxes to the people of Thembang as these land are owned by respective Bapus of Thembang.

Cherong and Tangchhenmu villages belong to the Geela clan of Thembang. The people of these villages do not pay any taxes to Thembang because their ancestors bought that land long before. Their roots are from Merak of Bhutan who were nomadic people grazing their yak which was their main occupation. They nomads killed the king of the Merak region and ran away all the way from Bhutan to this region with their livestock.

95% of people are involved in agriculture. People in the village cultivate crops like maize, barley, wheat, millet, buckwheat, etc. Livestock includes yak, cattle, the semi-wild Mithun (Bos frontalis) and their hybrids, in addition to sheep and horses. Milk products such as butter and cheese from yak, cattle, and their hybrids form an important source of income for the locals. Yak and sheep used for meat and are also used for their wool. Women weave rugs, carpets, clothes, and bags from locally produced wool.

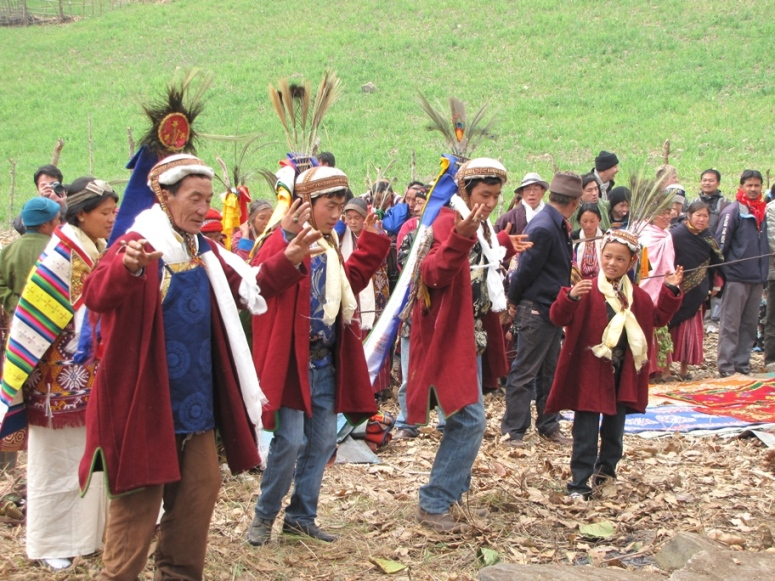
Ceremonial dance

There are four higher clans (Bapu): Khochilu, Dirkhipa, Sherchokpa, Atajaipu and four lower clans (Geela): Lhopa, Merakpa, Nyimu, and Sharmu. The Bapus manage all village affairs including land, agriculture, grazing grounds. Moreover, each Gila clan corresponds to one Bapu clan and use the land specified by their Bapu clan for agriculture, housing, and other purposes. Villages in the higher altitudes like Chanther and Lagam are predominantly pastoral whereas those lower down Thembang, Pangma, Gonthung, Semnak, Cherrong and Tangchhenmu are mostly agro-pastoral.

== Locale ==
Many small villages occupy the nearby the area under the jurisdiction of Thembang. These are Gonthung, Pangma, Semnak, Cherong, Tangchhenmu, Lagam, Chander, and Lachong. These villages have settled by people either migrated from Thembang or migrant from other regions.

== Population ==
Thembang village is constituted by four Bapu clans namely Khochilu, Sharchhokpa, Atajaipu and Dirkhipa, and four Gilla clans namely Lhopa, Merakpa, Nyimu and Sharmu. The Bapu clans are the descendants of a king of south Tibet who was the descendant of the emperor of Tibet, Songtsen Gampo (6th century). The Bapus control all the village affairs including land etc. The lands, including forest, grazing grounds, agricultural were all divided among the Bapus viz. Khochilu, Sharchhokpa, Atajaipu, and Dirkhipa. The four Gillas viz. Lhopa, Merakpa, Nyimu, and Sharmu live with their adjacent Bapu on the land specified by the Bapus for agricultural, housing or other purposes.

Thembang has witnessed very little impact of urbanisation. Clans residing inside the fort still live in stone houses that were constructed following indigenous Monpa architecture. There are many caves with religious significance and numerous Mani and Chorten in and around the village. There is a renovated Gonpa (Buddhist Temple) on the hill top of the village where traditional wood carvings, manuscripts have been carefully preserved. Villagers still practice their traditional lifestyle which has little influences of diverse cultures such as the Bhutanese, the Tibetans and the indigenous North-East Indian culture that includes their social structure and practices, rites, rituals and their vernacular building knowledge systems. Villagers do their traditional farming which is purely organic using very basic things such as cow dung and sheep scat and their urine as manure and oak leaves for mulching as well as for various other purposes. They also rear animal for agricultural purpose as well as to sustain their livelihood through various milk products. Some of the important festivals of Thembang are Losar, Hoishina, Choikor etc.

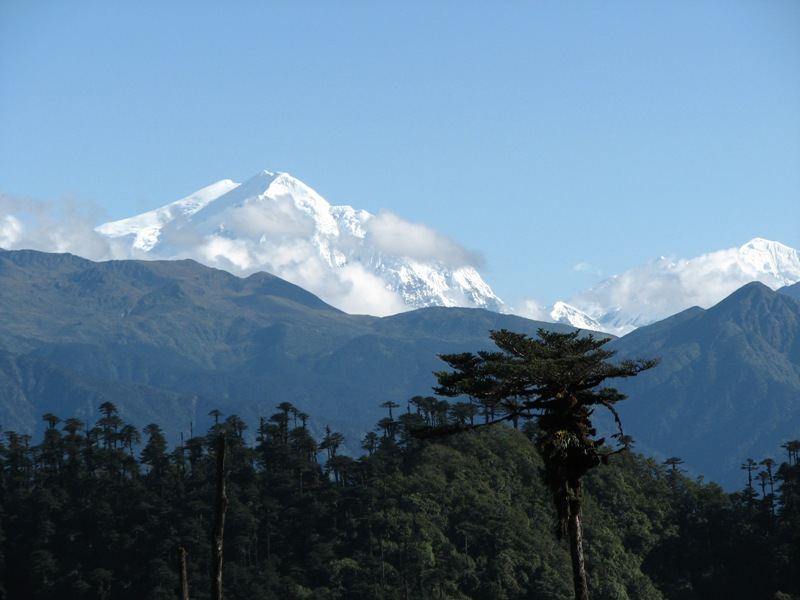
The Kangto Peak is the highest peak in the north-east after Kanchenjunga.

Thembang has a large forest area under its control with an altitude ranging from 1500 m to 7000 m above MSL. The forest type ranges from temperate to alpine meadows where one can find rare orchids, rhododendrons, primula and very rare medicinal plants. The faunal diversity includes rare species of animals such as the elusive Snow leopard, Red panda, Himalayan black bear, Clouded leopard, Chinese pangolin, Black pika, Blue sheep etc. The area is also rich in bird diversity which includes rare bird species like Himalayan monal, Blood pheasant, Bamboo partridge, Satyr tragopan, Khalij pheasant etc. The Thungri – Changla – Porshingla area of Thembang have already been identified as an Important Bird Area (IBA) by Birdlife International.

Having all these resources Community based eco-tourism was introduced in Thembang in a sustainable way which has already been conferred with the best Eco-tourism award for the year 2017 by the Department of Tourism, Govt of Arunachal Pradesh.

Thembang Dzong with its peculiar geographic location, diverse cultural influences, rich history and unique features unlike any other place is currently contending for UNESCO World Heritage Site.
