= Jonathan Goldman =

American musician

Jonathan Goldman is an American author, musician and spiritual teacher in the fields of Harmonics and Sound Healing. He is based in Boulder, Colorado.

== Career ==
Goldman began as a guitarist in the Boston punk scene in the late 1970s. Goldman began to research the science of sound and music psychology, directing his overall studies towards the possible use of sound as a healing force.

In 1982, he founded the Sound Healers Association (SHA) in Lexington, Massachusetts.

During this time, Goldman continued his research with a master's degree from Lesley University.

He began recording his own music and he formed Spirit Music, one of the first record labels dedicated to the therapeutic use of sound and music. The label has recorded and released music by Goldman, as well as Don Campbell, Sarah Benson, Sam McClellan, Laraaji, the Gyume Monks and more recently, Lama Tashi, among others.

In 2011 Jonathan Goldman was inducted into the Massage Therapy Hall of Fame. That year, he was also included by the Watkins Review as 74 on its list of "100 Most Spiritually Influential Living People in the World".

== Connection to Tibetan Buddhism ==
During his research, Goldman worked with the Gyume Monks. Goldman met and became a student of the monks during their 1988 US Tour.

He later went on to meet the Tibetan Buddhist Monk, Rinchen Chugyal, then Chant Master for the Drepung Loseling Monastery. In 1995 Rinchen Chugyal ordained Goldman as a Chant Master, empowering him to teach Tibetan Chanting in the West. He also met the Venerable Ngawang Tashi Bapu (Lama Tashi), who succeeded Rinchen Chugyal as Chant Master. Lama Tashi recorded several sessions of Tibetan chanting with Goldman. His 'Tibetan Master Chants', recorded and produced by Goldman, was nominated for a Grammy Award in 2004.

Goldman's chanting has been featured on several recordings, notably the 1999 Grammy Award-winning album by Kitaro, 'Thinking of You'; his own 'Chakra Chants' series; 'Chakra Dance', which was produced for the opening of a holistic dance club in New York City, and 'Medicine Buddha', made for the US teachings of the Dalai Lama in 2001.

== Discography and bibliography ==
As of June 2018, there are over 30 albums of Jonathan Goldman's own music released on Spirit Music and other labels. His music has ranged from new-age, chanting, ambient, minimalist, to techno.

As of June 2018 Goldman has written eight books in the field of sound healing which have been published. Four of Goldman's books have been published in numerous languages and are Best Sellers.

=== Discography ===
Year	Title	Label
1990	Dolphin Dreams	Spirit Music
1991	Gateways: Men's Drumming and Chanting	Spirit Music
1991	Angel of Sound	Spirit Music
1991	Trance Tara	Spirit Music
1992	Song of Saraswati	Spirit Music
1992	Sacred Gateways	Spirit Music
1994	The Angel and the Goddess	Spirit Music
1995	Celestial Reiki	Spirit Music
1998	The Lost Chord	Etherean Music
1999	Chakra Chants	Spirit Music
2000	Celestial Yoga	Spirit Music
2001	Medicine Buddha	Spirit Music
2001	Celestial Reiki	Spirit Music
2002	Ultimate Om	Spirit Music
2002	Holy Harmony	Spirit Music
2003	Healing Sounds DVD	Spirit Music
2004	Chakra Dance	Spirit Music
2004	Chakra Chants 2	Spirit Music
2004	Celestial Reiki II	Spirit Music
2005	Healing Sounds	Spirit Music
2005	Vocal Toning the Chakras	Sounds True
2005	Tantra of Sound Harmonizer w/ Andi Goldman	Spirit Music
2005	Frequencies: Sounds of Healing	Spirit Music
2005	The Divine Name w/Gregg Braden	Spirit Music
2006	Reiki Chants	Spirit Music
2007	De-stress	Spirit Music
2007	Waves of Light	Spirit Music
2008	2012: Ascension Harmonics	Spirit Music
2009	Crystal Bowls Chakra Chants	Spirit Music
2010	2013: Ecstatic Sonics	Spirit Music
2012	Cosmic Hum	Spirit Music
2013	The Divine Name: I AM	Spirit Music
2013	Merkaba of Sound	Spirit Music
2014	Healing Sounds: Frequencies II	Spirit Music
2014	Supreme Solfeggio	Spirit Music
2016	Quantum Resonance	Spirit Music
2018	Ambient Realms	Spirit Music
2018	Rainbows of Venus	Spirit Music
2019	Moon Over Bali	Spirit Music
2020	Music for the Heart Chakra	Spirit Music
2021	Moon Over Bali	Spirit Music
2022	Sounds of Light	Spirit Music

=== Bibliography ===
Year	Title	Publisher
1992	Healing Sounds: The Power of Harmonics	Healing Arts Press
1998	Shifting Frequencies	Light Technology Publications
1999	The Lost Chord	Spirit Music, Inc.
2005	Tantra of Sound	Hampton Roads Publishing
2008	The 7 Secrets of Sound Healing	Hay House
2010	The Divine Name: The Sound That Can Change the World	Hay House
2011	Chakra Frequencies	[Destiny Books]
2017	The Humming Effect: Sound Healing for Health	Healing Arts Press
2022	30th Anniversary Edition - Healing Sounds: The Power of Harmonics	Healing Arts Press

== Personal life ==
Goldman grew up in New Jersey, at a family-owned kosher hotel. His father, Irving B. Goldman was an otolaryngologist and plastic surgeon. Jonathan's wife, Andi Goldman, is a licensed therapist.
