= Chris Creveling =

American short track speed skater

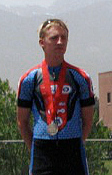
- Chris Creveling wears a silver medal at the 2007 US Inline Championships medal ceremony.

Personal information
- Born: December 29, 1986 (age 39) Flemington, New Jersey
- Height: 5 ft 10 in (178 cm)
- Weight: 154 lb (70 kg)
- Website: https://web.archive.org/web/20140203180021/http://www.chriscreveling.com/

Sport
- Country: United States
- Sport: Speed skating
- Coached by: Stephen Gough
Medal record
Men's short track speed skating
Representing the United States
Olympic Games
Silver medal – second place	2014 Sochi	5000 m relay
Inline World Championships
Gold medal – first place	2004 Abruzzo, Italy	Men's relay

Christopher Creveling (born December 29, 1986) is an American short track speed skater who represented the United States at the 2014 Winter Olympics. Growing up, his family owned a roller rink and was highly involved in the sport of roller skating. Creveling followed in the footsteps of his older siblings, learning to skate as soon as he could walk. He was selected for the 2003 United States' Junior World roller skating team in 2003 and for the Senior World Team from 2004 to 2006. At the 2004 World Championships, he won a gold medal as part of the US relay team.

In 2007, Creveling switched from inline skating to ice speed skating in hopes of making the Olympics. He tried both long track and short track speed skating before settling on short track. Creveling finished 13th overall at the 2010 Olympic short track trials. After moving to Salt Lake City, Utah to train full-time, he made the World Cup Team in 2012. Creveling placed second overall at 2013 National Championships, and won the 1000 meters at the meet. He was the top finishing American at the 2013 World Championships.

At the 2014 Olympic Trials, Creveling placed second overall and was the only skater to beat J.R. Celski in any race. At the Olympics, he was eliminated in the first round of the 1500 meters and in the quarterfinals of the 1000 meters. He helped the United States to a silver medal in the 5000 meter relay to conclude his first Olympic Games. As of January 2014, Creveling holds the American record in the 1000 meters.

== Early life ==
Christopher Creveling was born December 29, 1986, in Flemington, New Jersey, to father Ross and mother Christine (née Currie). He grew up in Kintnersville, Pennsylvania. In 1960, his grandfather, Paul Pinkerton, founded the Frenchtown Roller Rink. The rink, which is now run by Creveling's aunt and fourteen time national inline champion, Kay Pinkerton, had become the home of an elite inline skating team by the time Creveling was born. Like his siblings, Creveling began to skate as soon as he could walk. "[Speed skating is] all we did", recalls Ross Creveling. The family spent much of their time on the road attending meets during Creveling's youth.

In high school, Creveling ran cross country and played basketball, while competing at the international level in inline speed skating. He graduated from Palisades High School in 2005. He was offered a cross country college scholarship, but elected to continue with speed skating instead.

== Skating career ==
At age nine, Chris Creveling competed in his first inline speed skating event. Because of his late December birthday, he was the youngest kid in his age group, forcing him to work harder to keep up with the other kids. As an inline speed skater, Creveling was selected for the United States' Junior World Team in 2003 and the Senior World Team three times from 2004 to 2006. In 2004, he won a World Championship gold medal as part of United States' relay team.

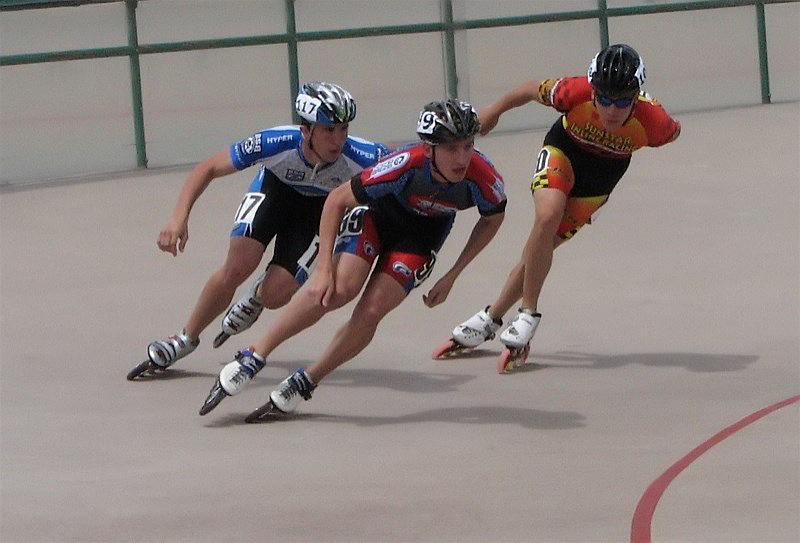
Creveling leads the way around a curve at the 2007 US Inline Outdoor National Championships.

Following the example of many former teammates, Creveling joined the Wheels on Ice program to start transitioning to ice speed skating in 2007. "[I decided I was] finished with inline skating and had accomplished enough there," he recalled. "I set my sights on an Olympic medal. Seeing how many of my friends had crossed over opened my eyes and made me realize there's something bigger out there." He moved to Salt Lake City, Utah, where he trained for both long track and short track speed skating. After a year, he concluded he was better suited for short track events. In 2009, he moved to Marquette, Michigan, home of the US Olympics Education Center, to continue training while also pursuing an education. He enrolled at Northern Michigan University, majoring in business finance. Creveling participated in the 2010 Olympic Trials, finishing 13th overall.

Facing budget constraints, the Olympics Education Center was closed. Creveling decided to drop out of school and move back to Salt Lake City to train full-time with the national team in 2012. "My education was important to me, he remarked. "But I knew I needed to move to be with the fastest guys in order to qualify for the Olympics." That fall, he won both time trials at the US Single Distance Championships and made the World Cup Team. He won his first World Cup medal when the United States placed third in the 5000 meter relay at Quebec. Creveling won the 1000 meters at the 2013 National Championships, and finished second overall at the event. At the 2013 World Championships in Hungary, he was the top American finisher, placing 16th overall.

During the 2013–14 World Cup season, Creveling helped the United States to a silver (at Seoul) and two gold medals (at Shanghai and Kolomna). The team finished first in the overall World Cup standings for the first time ever. At the 2014 Olympic Trials, he finished third in the 1500 meters after being disqualified in the second of two finals. The next day, Creveling fell in the first round of the 500 meters and failed to place in the event. On the final day of the Trials, he narrowly beat J.R. Celski in the first of two 1000 meter finals. "I really performed when it counted and felt like I just dominated the race. It couldn't have gone any better", he remarked. It was the only race Celski lost during the trials. Creveling finished second in the overall event point standings, securing a spot on the Olympic team. He called it "the best day of my life." Overall, he placed third for the meet.

Creveling opened his Olympics on February 10 with fourth-place finish in his 1500-meter heat. He failed to advance to the next round in that event, but on February 13 he made it out of the preliminary round of the 1000 meters with an easy second-place finish. He also skated in the semi-finals of the 5000 meter relay that day. Teammate Eduardo Alvarez fell in that race, but the United States advanced anyway when a judge ruled that Alvarez has illegally been interfered with by a South Korean skater. After coming up short in the quarterfinals of the 1000 meters on February 15, Creveling skated the lead leg of the 5000 meter relay on February 21. He was able to skate around a crash in the first lap of the race that took down China and the Netherlands and slowed Kazakhstan. From there, he and his teammates battled it out with Russia, ultimately winning the silver medal with a time of 6:42.371. After the Olympics, he said the ice was "really bad" for short track speed skating, but called the overall experience "just unbelievable".

Creveling is expected to compete in the World Championships from March 14–16. He said he probably won't make another Olympics, but has no plans to retire in the near future.

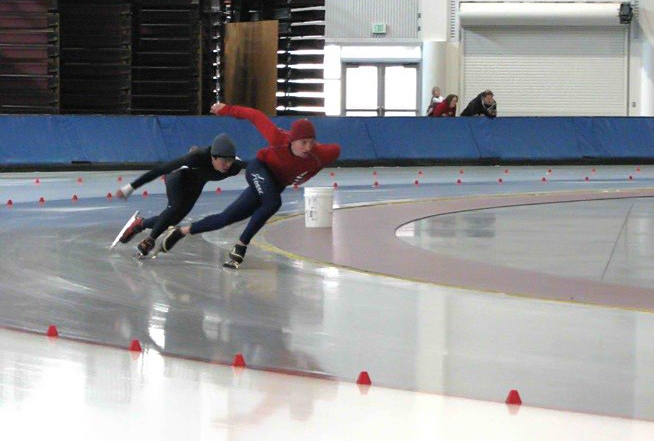
Creveling (red) and Sebastian Cano (black) warm up before the 2007 American Cup/World Cup Trials.

As of January 2014, Creveling holds the American record in the 1000 meters with a time of 1.23.187. He says his ability to change speed and dictate pace during a race is his greatest strength on the ice. He is coached by Stephen Gough. Like many of his teammates, Creveling has relied on donations from the public at GoFundMe.

== Personal life ==
Creveling's parents are now divorced. His father owns a construction company in Martins Creek, Pennsylvania, while his mother works as a nurse in San Diego. Creveling is the youngest of four siblings. His sister, Tracy Todd, is the oldest, followed by his brother Patrick, and sister Chelsea. Like Chris Creveling, Patrick and Chelsea were both world-class inline skaters, representing the United States at World Cup and World Championship meets. Patrick is now an inline skating coach.

Longtime friend and Olympic teammate, Kyle Carr, also has ties to the Frenchtown Roller Rink. Creveling met Carr when they were around three-years-old and the pair became friends at age nine or ten. "We spent a lot of time together at that point and just had fun racing together," Creveling recalled. "We didn’t take competing as a battle or anything. Just had laughs and enjoyed it."

When he is not skating, Creveling likes to go cycling, hiking, and snowboarding. He also plays golf and Frisbee, and writes on his blog. He enjoys road trips and spending time on the beach with his family during the off-season. Creveling lists Steve Jobs as the most influential person in his life, saying Job's book inspired changes in his life. He follows a gluten-free diet. In December 2012, he had LASIK surgery so that he could skate without contacts. He speaks German and Spanish in addition to English.
