= Gaia Movement USA =

US-based non-profit organization

Gaia-Movement Living Earth Green World Action USA, Gaia Movement USA, or simply Gaia, is a charitable organization based in Chicago, Illinois which collects used clothing for resale ("recycling") in the United States and developing countries.

The group describes their mission as educational and environmentally-focused; however, charity watchdog groups have challenged the organization's charitable claims, citing a lack of spending on environmental or other programs.

Gaia Movement USA has come under scrutiny for apparent ties to the Teachers Group/Tvind, a Danish organization linked to a number of clothing-collection charities; investigators say that Tvind misuses charity funds for the personal benefit of its top members, especially founder Mogens Amdi Petersen, who has been in hiding since the late 1970s. As of August 2016, Petersen and four other members of the Teachers Group are wanted by Interpol in connection with charges of tax evasion and embezzlement.

== Overview and history ==
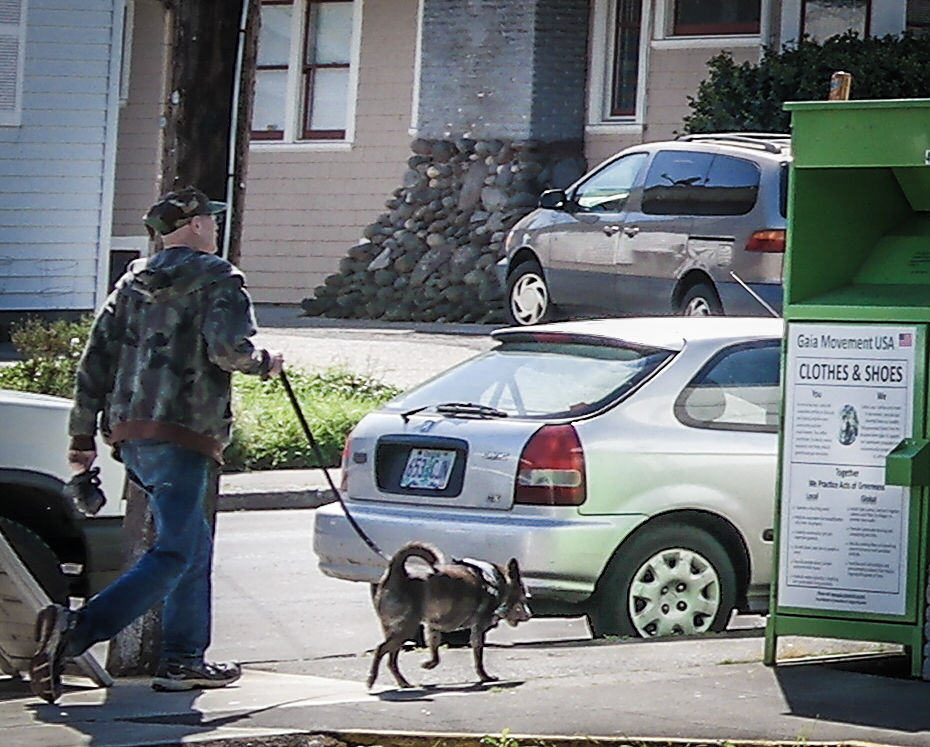
A Gaia Movement clothes and shoes collection bin in the United States

Gaia movement USA collects donated clothes and shoes in large bins placed along public streets. The Chicago Reader reported in 2001 that part of the donations were sold in local stores while the majority were exported in bulk, primarily to developing countries. The authors of a 2004 Chicago Tribune investigation observed that "The Gaia bins offer what people seem to want: painless altruism, cleaner closets, and utter convenience". Gaia's website stated their mission in March 2016 to be "to educate the general public about the plight of the environment while taking action to protect it".

The group was established in 1999 and incorporated in the state of Delaware by Danish-born activist Helle Lund. Memos obtained by the Danish police detailed a grant of $60,000 from Tvind, also known as the Teachers Group (TG), to procure metal collection bins and start Gaia Movement USA's operations in Chicago in 2000. Tvind, which critics liken to a cult organization, reportedly operates a number of similar aid agencies, as well as boarding schools and various commercial enterprises. The ultimate purpose of Tvind's charitable ventures, say investigators, is to enrich its top leaders under the guise of humanitarianism.

Journalists have investigated several related clothes-collection organizations linked to the Teachers Group besides Gaia Movement USA. They include Planet Aid, USAgain, Humana People to People, Institute for International Cooperation and Development, and Recycle for Change. Most have received failing ratings from philanthropy watchdog groups, yet have managed to place thousands of collection bins on streets in the United States. Through such clothing collection bins, the Teachers Group generates revenue of $50 million per year, according to public charities documents.

== Charity accountability ==
Charity Watch, previously the American Institute of Philanthropy, gave Gaia Movement USA and another Tvind-affiliated group, Planet Aid, a grade of "F" for "lack of transparency, insufficient spending on program services (11 to 44 percent) and too much spending on fundraising", according to the Chicago Tribune. According to Charity Watch, only 2% of the more than $3.4 million raised in 2014 by Gaia from the sale of used clothes was spent on programs related to educational and environmental concerns. A more recent study stated, "GAIA reports spending over 86% of its expenses on programs in 2016. CharityWatch's analysis of GAIA's 2016 tax form, however, shows the charity spending none, or 0%, of its expenses on programs.

Gaia includes the expense of processing used clothing in its accounting of environmental program costs, claiming that their clothing-collection activities prevent clothes from being disposed of in landfills. Charity Watch, on the other hand, characterizes collecting and processing donated clothes as a form of fundraising for the organization. They state that many charitable organizations compete for such donations, and that Gaia sells the majority of the goods it collects rather than distributing them to those in need. Charity Watch asserts that used clothes would otherwise more likely end up with another charity or for-profit company than in a landfill. In Gaia's financial report for 2013, expenses related to "recycling" used clothes made up more than 96% of the total allocated to environmental programs.

Based on reports from 2008, the Better Business Bureau (BBB) states that Gaia Movement USA failed to meet 8 of its 20 charity accountability standards. The BBB estimated that only 1% of Gaia's revenue was going to charitable programs, if the clothes collection program were counted as fundraising. Gaia afterward reported changing some of its accounting practices so that only a portion of its clothes-recycling activities were defined as charitable services. As of June 2016, an evaluation of the organization's governance, finances, and fundraising by the BBB Wise Giving Alliance was listed as "in progress".

An investigation by The Chicago Tribune found that approximately 4% of Gaia's expenses were listed as "charitable donations to environmental causes" between 1999 and 2002. In what the Tribune describes as "a typical pattern of money movement among Tvind ventures", the actual benefactor was a group in Switzerland named Gaia-Movement. According to the Tribune, only a small fraction of the funds transferred was ever spent on environmental work, and that that work was fraught with mismanagement and poor outcomes for the community involved. The Tribune reports that four of Gaia Movement USA's directors had served on the board of the Swiss charity, which had given Gaia Movement USA a large start-up grant in 1999. In return, Gaia Movement USA pledged to donate a comparable sum to the Swiss Gaia before funding any other environmental projects. "At worst, the Chicago Gaia's grants might be viewed as Tvind's gift to itself; at best, repayment on a loan", according to the Tribune.

== Environmental claims ==
Gaia's application for nonprofit status listed several projects in developing countries relating to forestry, agriculture, and waste management to be supported with funds generated from clothing donations. However, the Chicago Reader reported that in the following two and a half years the proceeds from the sale of clothing were used entirely within the used-clothing operation.

Despite the lack of spending on environmental projects, in 2001 Gaia Movement bins in Chicago stated the organization's goals to be "saving animals; becoming a part of the Gaia-Movement; practicing deep ecology; [and] acting as partners in the solidary [sic] humanism", along with 18 separate environmental projects, including the establishment of nature reserves, preserving natural habitats including mangrove forests and the barrier reef, environmental education, supporting sustainable forestry, water purification, carbon-neutral electricity generation, natural sewage systems, and building wildlife sanctuaries.

The bins also urged donors to contribute by claiming that Gaia would get "$2 worth for every $1 spent". Gaia Movement USA's director Eva Nielsen explained this by saying "It's more like a symbol. It's not concrete. It's like we are devoting a lot of money to the environment."

== Labor practices ==
The costs of maintaining the bins and paying drivers is partly offset in Gaia's case by hiring non-unionized workers, who as of 2004 were also not offered health insurance, according to the Chicago Tribune. Gaia and other related clothing operations also employ student volunteers who have joined Tvind schools to learn about humanitarian aid; they often work scouting for new clothing box locations. Some of these volunteers arrive via the Institute for International Cooperation and Development (IICD). The IICD, a part of Tvind's "DRH Movement", exists ostensibly to train young people for humanitarian projects in developing countries. Former students interviewed by the Chicago Tribune, however, said they received little to no training, instead being sent out on fundraising missions. Several students said that they were enlisted to work for Gaia and the for-profit USAgain in their clothing-collection operation under the guise of raising money for their overseas projects. Some quit after discovering that the funds were going instead to Tvind and the IICD.

Tvind has also attempted to enlist children in foster care and other youthful wards of the state to provide a workforce for Gaia and other clothing- collection charities. Tvind's application to operate a boarding school in Michigan for troubled youth to work collecting and sorting clothes for Gaia in Chicago was denied in 2003.

== Tvind embezzlement scandal ==
Tvind was founded in Denmark circa 1970, and has since expanded its business activities to as many as 50 countries. According to Danish police estimates, the Teachers Group/Tvind controls global assets exceeding US$850 million. A 2001 FBI report into Tvind stated, "Tvind derives income from the creation of developmental aid organizations. Money is raised by the collection of used clothes. The clothes are recycled and sold in third world countries. The proceeds are sent to charitable trust funds established in off shore tax havens. ... In each of these organizations the funds are ultimately controlled by captioned subjects who divert the money for personal use. Little to no money goes to the charities". A 2004 investigation by Chicago Tribune reporter and former IICD student Monica Eng connected Gaia, which was not mentioned in either the FBI or Danish police reports, to Tvind through its financial records.

In a 1998 report to Danish authorities, former Tvind leader Steen Thomsen said that the various charities linked to the group artificially inflate the value of the used clothing they collect by buying and selling it among themselves at "symbolic prices" (known as transfer pricing) before selling the clothes to the public. Thomsen says that he left Tvind in 1998 because he was required to help embezzle money for the Teachers Group and Petersen. He says that Petersen's personal physician, Marianne Thomsen (no relation) would conduct checkups on members of the Teachers Group as a way of monitoring their activities for Petersen.

Tvind founder Mogens Amdi Petersen was apprehended in the United States in 2002, and later extradited to stand trial in Denmark for embezzlement and tax evasion. Petersen insisted that the allegations were false and a result of political persecution. A judge declared Petersen and six other Tvind members not guilty, upon which Petersen disappeared from the country along with four of his co-defendants. At the appeals trial, Tvind spokesperson Poul Jørgensen was convicted of fraud and sentenced to 30 months in prison. In 2013, Petersen and four others were sentenced in absentia to a year in prison for their suspected role in embezzling millions of Danish kroner from the Tvind Humanitarian Fund during the 1990s. As of August 2016, Petersen and his colleagues are wanted by the police agency Interpol in connection with the fraud case. They are believed to be in hiding in a coastal resort compound in Mexico.
