= Planet Aid =

American non-profit organization

Planet Aid, Inc.

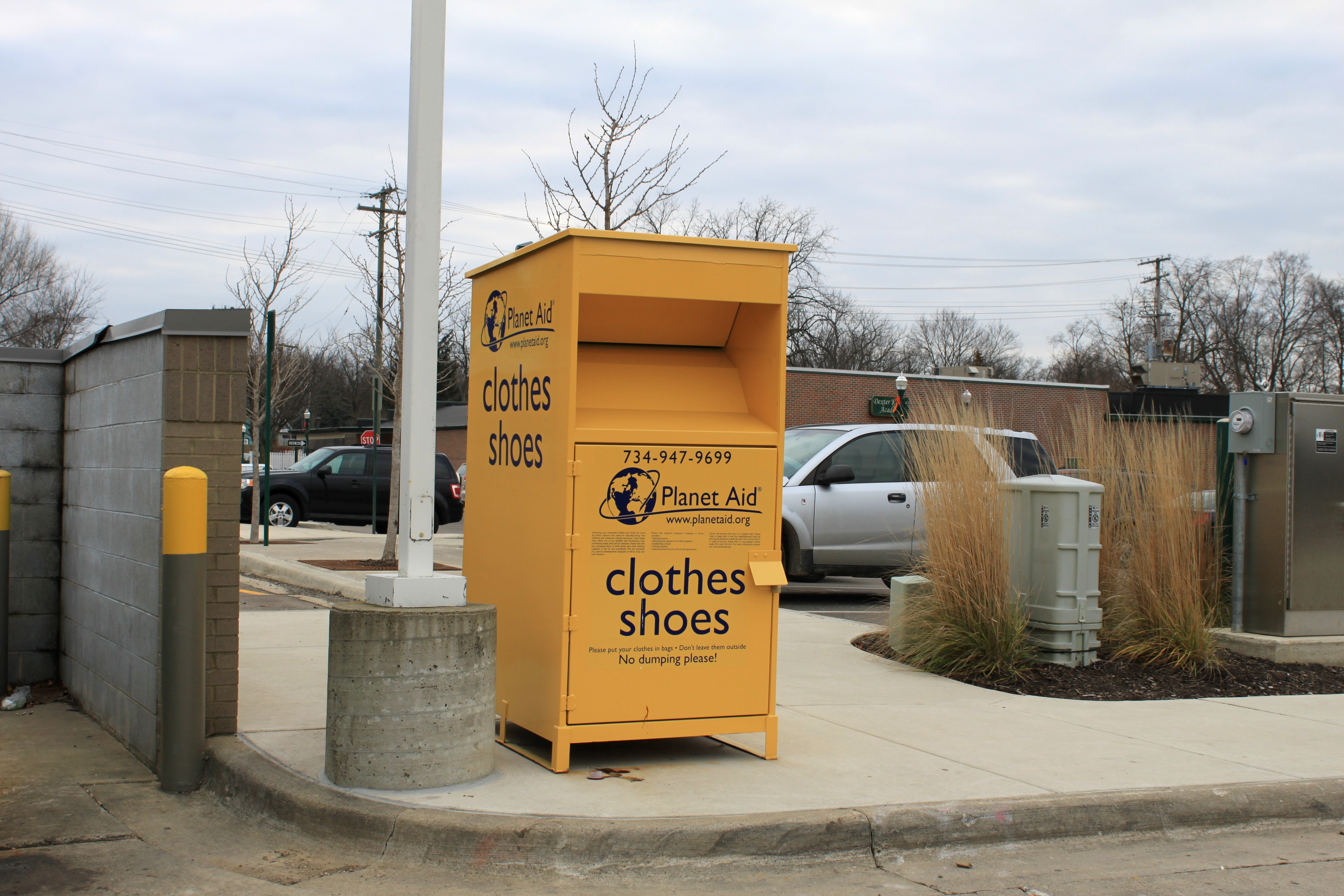
- Planet Aid collection box in Dexter, Michigan
- Formation: October 1997; 29 years ago
- Founded at: Holliston, Massachusetts
- Type: 501(c)(3) NGO
- Tax ID no.: 04-3348171
- Headquarters: Elkridge, Maryland
- Region served: Northern New England; Southern New England; Upstate New York; New Jersey/New York; Allentown, Pennsylvania; Philadelphia, Pennsylvania; Pittsburgh, Pennsylvania; Baltimore–Washington Metropolitan Area; North Carolina; Cleveland, Ohio; Columbus, Ohio; Detroit, Michigan; Kansas City, Missouri
- Chief Executive and Co-founder: Ester Neltrup
- Board Chair and Co-founder: Mikael Norling
- Affiliations: Humana People to People; Global Campaign for Education; InterAction; Project Green Schools
- Website: planetaid.org

Planet Aid is a non-profit organization headquartered in Elkridge, Maryland. Its primary activity is the collection of clothing and other household items for resale and recycling. Founded in 1997 in Massachusetts, the organization has expanded down the East Coast of the United States and operates in 23 states, where it collects items through donation bins placed on sidewalks, parking lots, and other public areas.

Some of the proceeds, along with U.S. government grants, are used for charitable aid in Malawi, Mozambique, Zimbabwe, and other African nations.

The American Institute of Philanthropy's CharityWatch has given the organization an "F" rating, disputing Planet Aid's assessment of its charitable spending. Investigations by media and government agencies have also found discrepancies in the stated amount of Planet Aid's charitable expenses, as well as alleged links between Planet Aid and the controversial Danish organization Tvind, whose leader, Mogens Amdi Petersen, is wanted on charges of fraud and tax evasion. Planet Aid has denied these allegations. Planet Aid is a member of the international charity group Humana People to People, an offshoot of Tvind.

== History ==
Planet Aid is part of an international charitable organization called Humana People to People, founded in Denmark in 1977. Humana began as a door-to-door clothing collection drive aimed at helping people living under the rule of apartheid in South Africa. Planet Aid first began operating in the United States in 1997 by opening a collection center in Lawrence, Massachusetts. The organization later moved to Lowell, Massachusetts in May 1998, and also opened retail locations in Malden, Waltham, and Somerville.

In 2000, Planet Aid's operations spread to the Washington metropolitan area by placing its yellow bins in several cities in the area. By 2002, Planet Aid operated in about seven states in the US, reaching as far south as Winston-Salem, North Carolina. By 2004, the organization began expanding into the mid-west by establishing operations in Pittsburg, Kansas. As of 2007, the organization operated in a total of 19 states which included several cities in Upstate New York. Several of the communities into which the organization had expanded and news reports on the charity's expansion became critical of the nonprofit's finances.

The organization has been impacted by local ordinances that impose restrictions on the placement of collection bins. Some municipalities have proposed outright bans on all donation bins, which have sometimes impacted Planet Aid. In 2014, Planet Aid filed a lawsuit against Ypsilanti Township, Michigan, one of a number of cities that had passed a local ordinance banning charity collection boxes over concerns about litter and vandalism. In April 2015, a federal appeals court upheld an earlier federal court ruling that Planet Aid's collections bins constitute a protected form of free speech and struck down a local zoning restriction in St. Johns, Michigan that had outlawed all such collection boxes, as a violation of the First Amendment protections. Since winning its federal ruling, Planet Aid has sued several other cities with similar ordinances, and used the decision to induce local leaders to craft regulations that allow placement of such boxes. Planet Aid's CEO Ester Neltrup told the Los Angeles Times that Planet Aid supports some regulation on clothing recycling, but opposes bans on donation boxes.

On October 1, 2015, Planet Aid opened its first thrift store in Baltimore as part of a pilot project. The store employed 30 people and offered "tens of thousands of new items every week," in addition to serving as a donation center, according to The Baltimore Sun. Proceeds from purchases in the store go towards Planet Aid's sustainable development projects.

== Operations ==
Planet Aid, Inc. collects used clothing through a wide network of donation bins placed on public and private property, donation centers, and curbside pickups. The group has collaborated with local businesses and other organizations to place bins on their property, with an aim to make donations more convenient and thus increase recycling rates. The group states that recycling used clothing and shoes contributes to reduced emissions of greenhouse gases and helps in reducing the amount of waste that municipalities must haul from residences. It was estimated as of 2008 that the organization collects and resells over 70 million pounds of clothing per year. As of February 2016, the organization has collection bins in 23 states in the United States.

Charities like Planet Aid that collect used clothing sell them both domestically and on the international market. According to Planet Aid, the proceeds from resold donated clothes and recycled textiles are used to fund international development projects via organizations in Africa, Asia, and the Americas. However, the program does on occasion donate bedding and winter clothing from its collections to local US resident in needs. As of 2015, 94% of its grant funding is directed to programs operated as part of the Humana People to People (HPP) Federation.

In November 2015, the US State Department sponsored an educational visit of Planet Aid's Elkridge, Maryland headquarters for a delegation of Russian recycling experts to learn how Planet Aid sorts and handles 100 million pounds of donated textiles every year and how they can develop similar practices and infrastructure in that country.

=== Africa ===
Planet Aid participates in a number of programs in Africa. Planet Aid has been operating as a charity in partnership with Development Aid from People to People in Malawi (DAPP Malawi) since 1995. In 2001, Planet Aid partnered with Johnson & Johnson in aiding the fight against the spread of AIDS in Southern Africa. In 2004, the organization was given a grant from the U.S. Department of Agriculture to establish the Food for Progress in Mozambique. In 2012, they collaborated with the U.S. Department of Agriculture for the Farmers Club project, which provides school meals and teacher training in Mozambique and Malawi. These programs are run through DAPP Malawi and Ajuda de Desenvolvimento de Povo para Povo (ADPP), who, along with Planet Aid, are members of the Humana People to People Federation.

The DAPP In-Service Teacher Training Program in Malawi, supported by Planet Aid, was awarded the UNESCO-Hamdan bin Rashid Al-Maktoum Prize in 2016.

Planet Aid has also collaborated with the World Initiative for Soy in Human Health program, run by the American Soybean Association, to provide nutrition education in Mozambique.

The U.S. Agency for International Development has also awarded Planet Aid 93.8 metric tons (92.3 long tons) of prepackaged food in 2011 and 112.6 metric tons (110.8 long tons) in 2012 for distribution in Zimbabwe.

== Charity accountability ==
CharityWatch disputes Planet Aid's accounting of costs associated with collecting and processing donated clothing, giving them an "F" rating. Planet Aid earned $33 million from selling used clothes in 2018. Accordingly, CharityWatch says the costs of collecting used clothes are fundraising expenses, rather than charitable program expenses as claimed by Planet Aid; hence Planet Aid spent only 25% of its budget on charitable programs in 2018, rather than the claimed 85%. Planet Aid's federal tax filing from 2011 shows 28% of its budget being used for international aid programs, with the remainder mostly being spent on collecting and processing used clothes.

The BBB Wise Giving Alliance (WGA) lists Planet Aid as an accredited charity, stating that as of January 2020 Planet Aid fulfills its 20 standards for charity accountability. Charity Navigator gave the organization a three out of four star rating with a total score of 81.62 percent in 2019.

== Alleged Teachers Group connections ==
Media and government investigations have linked Planet Aid, through its board members and financial dealings, to a controversial organization from Denmark called the Teachers Group or Tvind, led by international fugitive Mogens Amdi Petersen. Tvind has been characterized by former members as a secular/political cult, and Tvind leaders have been prosecuted in Denmark for financial crimes, with two convictions in trials in 2006 and 2009, respectively.

Planet Aid has denied any such links, although they are a member of the Humana People to People Federation, an offshoot of Tvind, and several leaders of Planet Aid had been identified as having ties to Tvind and Petersen. Planet Aid co-founder and board chair Mikael Norling is a Tvind official, and he was present at the preliminary hearings for the Danish Tvind trials in September 2002. Planet Aid CEO Ester Neltrup was the Executive Director for the Tvind-run Institute for International Cooperation and Development, and has stated that she and others on Planet Aid's board of directors were Teachers Group members. Marie Lichtenberg, the director of international partnerships at Humana People to People and Planet Aid, was identified by Danish law enforcement as a manager of Tvind's global financial operations. Josefin Jonsson, a founding director of Planet Aid, was also a founding director of IFAS, a foundation identified by Danish prosecutors as a front organization used by Petersen for embezzlement and tax fraud.

In March 2016, an investigation co-produced by The Center for Investigative Reporting (CIR) and the Public Radio Exchange reported that, according to interviews with "several (unnamed) insiders" of Planet Aid and associated Humana People to People member organizations, including "at least a dozen people inside" DAPP Malawi, "50% to 70% of the US government grant money was being siphoned away" to Tvind.

The USDA issued a statement saying that "none of their formal compliance reviews, their ad hoc reviews, their site evaluations, or their audits of the Planet Aid projects have yielded any significant findings or concerns", although documents obtained by the CIR stated that a USDA program analyst who had visited the project in Malawi was concerned that the use of funds was ineffective and lacked transparency.

A follow-up report by CIR cited a 2001 report by the United States Federal Bureau of Investigation that identified Planet Aid, Humana People to People, and DAPP as part of a network of organizations that diverted charitable funds for personal use by Teachers Group members. In response, the United Nations Children's Fund halted funding to these organizations. An August 2016 report by the British Broadcasting Corporation, in partnership with the Center for Investigative Reporting, led the United Kingdom Department for International Development to suspend payments as well.

=== Center for Investigative Reporting lawsuit ===
In 2017 Planet Aid sued The Center for Investigative Reporting (CIR) for libel, alleging a conspiracy to interfere with Planet Aid's business over CIR's reporting on Planet Aid's business practices and relations with Tvind. CIR compared the case to Bollea v. Gawker, saying it was an attempt by deep pocketed individuals to use the courts to silence a media outlet.

In March 2021, the case was dismissed with prejudice. The court ruled that although Reveal's publications had included 46 false allegations regarding Planet Aid and other plaintiffs, who were able to provide evidence that all funds were accounted for and used for intended projects, the plaintiffs were public figures and therefore subject to a higher standard for libel. "In sum, as to the allegedly defamatory statements for which plaintiffs have sufficiently shown falsity, plaintiffs have failed to show defendants made those statements with actual malice, and, consequently, their defamation claim is subject to dismissal."

== See also ==
- Other clothes collection organizations alleged to be controlled by Tvind/The Teachers Group:
  - Gaia Movement USA
  - USAgain
