= GCFGlobal.org =

Free online educational website

- Website type: Online education/e-learning
- Available in: English, Spanish, and Portuguese
- Owner: Goodwill Community Foundation Inc
- Creator: Rev. Dennis McLain
- Website: edu.gcfglobal.org

GCFGlobal.org (formerly GCFLearnFree.org) is a free online educational website focusing on technology, job training, reading, and math skills. The site is a program of the Goodwill Community Foundation Inc. (GCF). Content in English and Spanish are produced in Raleigh, North Carolina and Bogotá, Colombia respectively, which allows the platform to create content accordingly to each language.

== History ==
GCFLearnFree.org was created in July 2000 by Goodwill Community Foundation Inc president Dennis McLain as an online training program with both English and Spanish language lessons. The program was funded through revenue generated from the value of donated items to Goodwill Community Foundation (GCF).

== Self-paced tutorials ==
The GCFGlobal.org programs are designed around self-paced instruction. The website offers dozens of free, self-paced tutorials in technology, Microsoft Office, work and career, reading, math, and everyday life. All tutorials can be accessed with no registration required, but users can also create a free GCFGlobal.org account to track their learning history and create transcripts of completed tutorials. Tutorials use video, sound, art, storytelling, and text. GCFGlobal.org's self-paced tutorials are part of the free resources available at DigitalLiteracy.gov, an Obama administration initiative focused on digital literacy. GCFGlobal.org is also an Everyoneon.org partner. Organizations that use GCFGlobal.org include K-12 schools, colleges, homeschool groups, nonprofit organizations, libraries, businesses, and career centers.

== Online classes ==
GCFGlobal.org offers free online classes that offer certificates of completion. Online classes require registration and submission of assignments, and they are supported by online instructors. The online class program is accredited by the International Association for Continuing Education and Training (IACET).

== Awards and recognition ==
GCFLearnFree.org won the 2012 MERLOT Classics Award for its Word 2010 tutorial. GreatNonprofits, a provider of user reviews about nonprofit organizations, named GCFLearnFree.org a 2014 Top-Rated Nonprofit based on reviews submitted by people who volunteer for or use the website. However, calling GCFLearnFree.org a "nonprofit" is not exactly accurate because the Employer Identification Number listed for GCFLearnFree.org by GreatNonprofits is registered with the Internal Revenue Service to Goodwill Community Foundation Inc. and not to GCFLearnFree.org, and the name "GCFLearnFree.org" does not appear in other major nonprofit databases such as GuideStar and Charity Navigator but "Goodwill Community Foundation Inc." does.
