= Feed the Children =

US non-profit organization

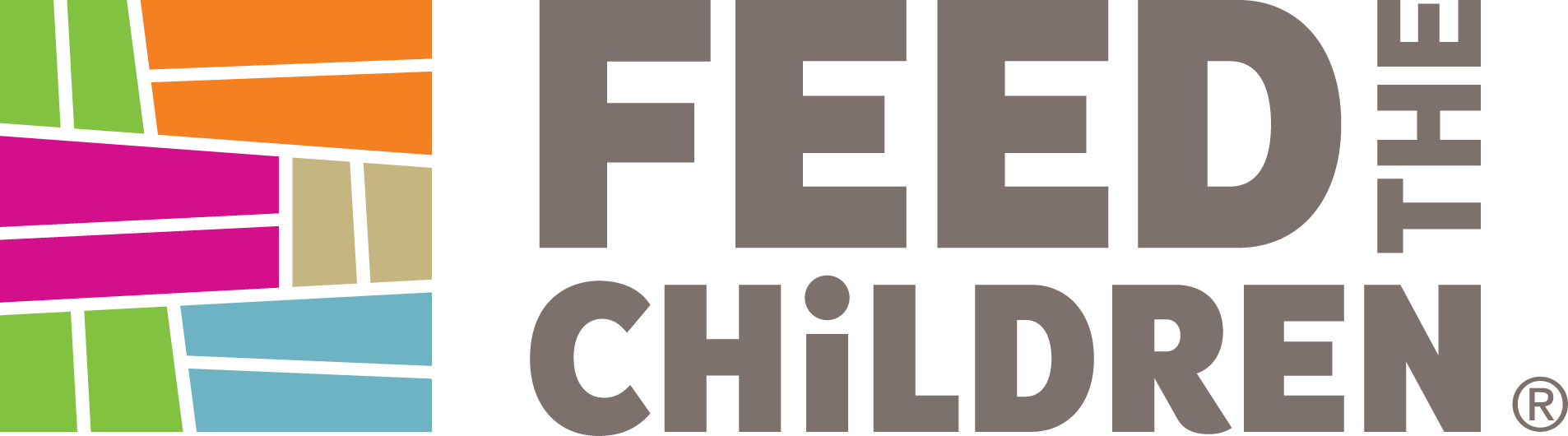
- Founded: 1979
- Type: Nonprofit 501(c)(3)
- Purpose: Delivers food, daily essentials, vitamins and other necessities to children and families who lack these items due to famine, poverty, or natural disaster.
- Headquarters: Oklahoma City, Oklahoma
- Region served: United States and Internationally
- Key people: Emily A. Callahan, President and CEO
- Website: www.feedthechildren.org

Feed the Children, established in 1979 and headquartered in Oklahoma City, Oklahoma, is a global movement working to end child hunger. Its vision is to "create a world where no child goes to bed hungry." The organization provides food, essentials, and opportunities across the United States and in eight countries around the world. Domestically, Feed the Children operates three distribution centers located in Oklahoma, Indiana, and Tennessee.

In fiscal year 2021, Feed the Children distributed 91.5 million pounds of food and essentials to children and families in the United States. Internationally, the organization's food, nutrition, water, sanitation, and livelihood programs benefitted 2,000,000 people in 8 African, Asian, and Latin American countries. The organization is accredited by GuideStar Exchange and the BBB Wise Giving Alliance.

== U.S. programs ==
Feed the Children's domestic programs focus on the acquisition, management, and distribution of food and other gift-in-kind goods to regional and local community partners, agencies, and food banks throughout the United States. In fiscal year 2021, Feed the Children provided 91.5 million pounds of shelf-stable food and other goods.

Feed the Children operates "Teacher Stores" at its distribution centers, which offer free school supplies, books, and healthy snacks to educators in area Title I schools. Through its partnership with the National Association of Educators for Homeless Children and Youth (NAEHCY), Feed the Children has distributed more than one million Homeless Education and Literacy Program (H.E.L.P.) backpacks containing school supplies, food, and personal care items to at-risk or homeless children enrolled in U.S. public schools. In FY21, the organization's "Teacher Stores" received 29,538 visits from teachers across 482 school districts.

== International programs ==
Through their work, they hope that: 1) All children will be properly nourished and developed by age five and continue to understand the importance of nutrition throughout their life; 2) All children will have access to safe and clean water, proper sanitation, and adequate hygiene resources that promote healthy immune systems and enable them to develop through adolescence and into adulthood; 3) All children will be able to enroll, feel safe, and complete a high-quality education that promotes lifelong learning; and 4) Families will be self-reliant, financially stable, and able to support and strengthen their communities.

Examples of international projects funded by Feed the Children include medical mission trips and the "Casa del Niño" (House of the child) in Barrio Ingles, La Ceiba, Honduras. In 2009 FTC has greatly expanded its program in Malawi. Using in-kind donations from Nuskin, Inc, 50,000 orphans and pre-school children, mostly in rural areas, receive a fortified porridge, VitaMeal. Feed the Children has received an $8.5 million grant from the USAID as part of a five-year, $20 million project for orphans and vulnerable children. This will improve food security and access to nutrition, education, clean water, sanitation and sustainable agricultural development for 40,000 households and over 70,000 children impacted by HIV/AIDS in Malawi. The Tiwalere OVC Project, in full operation in 2011, will make Malawi the largest international program.

In 2015, Feed the Children was granted special consultative status to the United Nations Economic and Social Council (ECOSOC). In 2017, The U.S. Agency for International Development (USAID) awarded Feed the Children the largest grant in its history – more than $19.15 million – to fund the Tiwalere II project. Following the success of Tiwalere I, a similar but smaller project that improved nutrition for orphans and vulnerable children in Malawi from 2010 to 2015, the Tiwalere II project will strive to achieve significant and sustainable improvements in the nutritional status of children under the age of five, pregnant and lactating women, mothers of children under the age of two and adolescent girls in ten districts within central and northern Malawi.

== Disaster relief ==
When Hurricane Katrina struck the Gulf Coast in 2005, Feed the Children self-reported sending over 650 semi tractor-trailers totaling more than 20,000 tons of donated food and relief supplies. Between the September 11, 2001, attacks on the United States and the South Asian tsunami in December 2004, Feed the Children self-reported sending more than 15,500 tons of food and relief supplies to the affected regions.

Feed the Children responded to the flooding in Louisiana, Virginia and West Virginia, the devastation caused by Hurricane Matthew, as well as other disasters as it distributed $3.4 million worth of food and essentials to disaster-affected regions in the United States. Internationally, in fiscal year 2017, Feed the Children trained more than 32,000 individuals in disaster risk-reduction and provided supplies like food, water and tarps to 57,000 individuals.

== Finances ==
According to Feed the Children's IRS Form 990 for fiscal year 2021, 94% of its budget went to program services (childcare, food, medical, disaster relief, education and community development), 3% went to fundraising and 3% went to management and supporting services.

Forbes ranked Feed the Children as the 29th largest charity in the United States in its 2022 America's Top Charities report.

== Reception ==
Feed the Children is accredited by the BBB Wise Giving Alliance.

The organization is a member of InterAction, an alliance of international NGOs and partners in the United States.

== Controversy ==
Feed the Children's financial and spending practices have long attracted scrutiny and at one point, prompted the American Institute of Philanthropy (AIP) to label FTC the "Most Outrageous Charity in America". Based on the rating criteria used by the AIP, in 2008, Feed the Children spent only 21–23% of its cash budget of $125 million on charitable programs, compared to 63–65% on fundraising, including 54% on TV, radio and direct mail/postage. This was a slight improvement from 2005 when 18% FTC's cash budget was spent on charitable programs and 60% on TV, radio and mail advertisements. Feed the Children and others contest the reliability of AIP's rating method for not taking "gifts in kind" which are included by most other established charity rating organizations, into account. The AIP has speculated Feed the Children's charitable footprint is exaggerated due to the value their non-cash distributions being inflated; an allegation that has at times been echoed by Feed the Children's own auditors.

Former U.S. congressman J.C. Watts Jr. served as Feed the Children's president and CEO from February 2016 until his termination in November 2016. In April 2017, Watts filed a wrongful termination suit against Feed the Children and its board of directors claiming financial mismanagement at the charity. Watts claimed that although he repeatedly brought these issues to the attention of the board of directors, including his concern some of the unspecified irregularities constituted criminal misconduct, no action was taken, forcing him to report the organization to the Oklahoma Attorney General's Office - which then launched a formal investigation. The Attorney General at the time was Mike Hunter, Watt's Chief of Staff from 1995 to 1999 when Watts was in Congress. Watts told a board member of this on November 3, 2016, in a conversation in which the organization claims Watts' stated he would "either get a new board of directors or the organization could get a new CEO". Watts was terminated during a special board meeting held on November 4, 2016. Watts' lawsuit alleges the special board meeting was called to terminate him in retaliation, while the organization claims the meeting was already scheduled to address internal complaints and concerns regarding Watts' performance and conduct.

Feed the Children responded that Watts' allegations had been reviewed by outside counsel and found to be "baseless and without merit". In June 2017, Feed the Children filed a counter-suit against Watts, noting several discussions pertaining to "(Watts') insubordinate, dishonest and improper conduct, his failings as President and Chief Executive Officer and the termination of (Watts') employment" had already taken place prior to the November 4, 2016 special board meeting in which he was terminated. The organization claims Watts had "misrepresented his fundraising ability" and "misrepresented that he had a Rolodex worth millions of dollars" to raise millions in additional funds for programs and services, but that after 9 months he had raised only $14,000. Feed the Children's counter-suit against Watts sought damages for losses they claimed were negligently incurred by him during his tenure as president and CEO. In July 2019, as part of a settlement, Feed the Children dropped their counter-suit and agreed to pay Watts $1 million to drop his case.

The investigation by the Oklahoma Attorney General later ended after finding no support for Watts' allegations.

== Power struggle with Larry Jones ==
After a lengthy leadership dispute between founder Larry Jones and the board and top executives of the charity, Jones agreed to give up operational control in August 2009. On November 6, 2009, the board voted to fire Jones from his position as president. On January 28, 2011, Jones and Feed The Children announced a resolution of the legal dispute. Jones is no longer associated in any way with Feed the Children. On June 4, 2012, Kevin Hagan, formerly with Good360, became the president and CEO of Feed the Children.

In 2013, Feed The Children disclosed that it paid $800,000 to Jones, after he was fired in 2009. The severance payment, made during fiscal year 2012, was disclosed in a 204-page return filed with the Internal Revenue Service. Feed the Children made the payment to settle a wrongful termination lawsuit filed by Jones. The charity paid an additional amount in legal fees to Jones' attorney, Mark Hammons.

== Current leadership ==
On November 15, 2016, the board of directors announced Travis Arnold would be serving as executive director and interim CEO. In early 2017, Arnold was made Feed the Children's new official president and CEO, positions he continues to hold as of December 2020.

In August 2020, it was announced that Bregeita Jefferson would become Feed the Children's next chief international operations, finance and compliance officer (CIOFCO).
