= Military Order of the Purple Heart =

US war veterans organization

- Logo of the Military Order of the Purple Heart
- Formation: 1932
- Headquarters: Springfield, VA
- Members: Approx. 49,300
- Website: purpleheart.org

The Military Order of the Purple Heart (MOPH) is a congressionally chartered (Title 36 USC Chapter 1405) United States war veterans organization. Headquartered just outside Washington, D.C., it has a membership of approximately 45,300 veterans. It is unique in that its members are exclusively men and women who have received the Purple Heart award while serving as a member of the U.S. Military.

== Mission ==
The MOPH's stated mission is "to foster an environment of goodwill and camaraderie among combat wounded veterans, promote patriotism, support necessary legislative initiatives, and most importantly, provide service to all veterans and their families."

== National programs ==
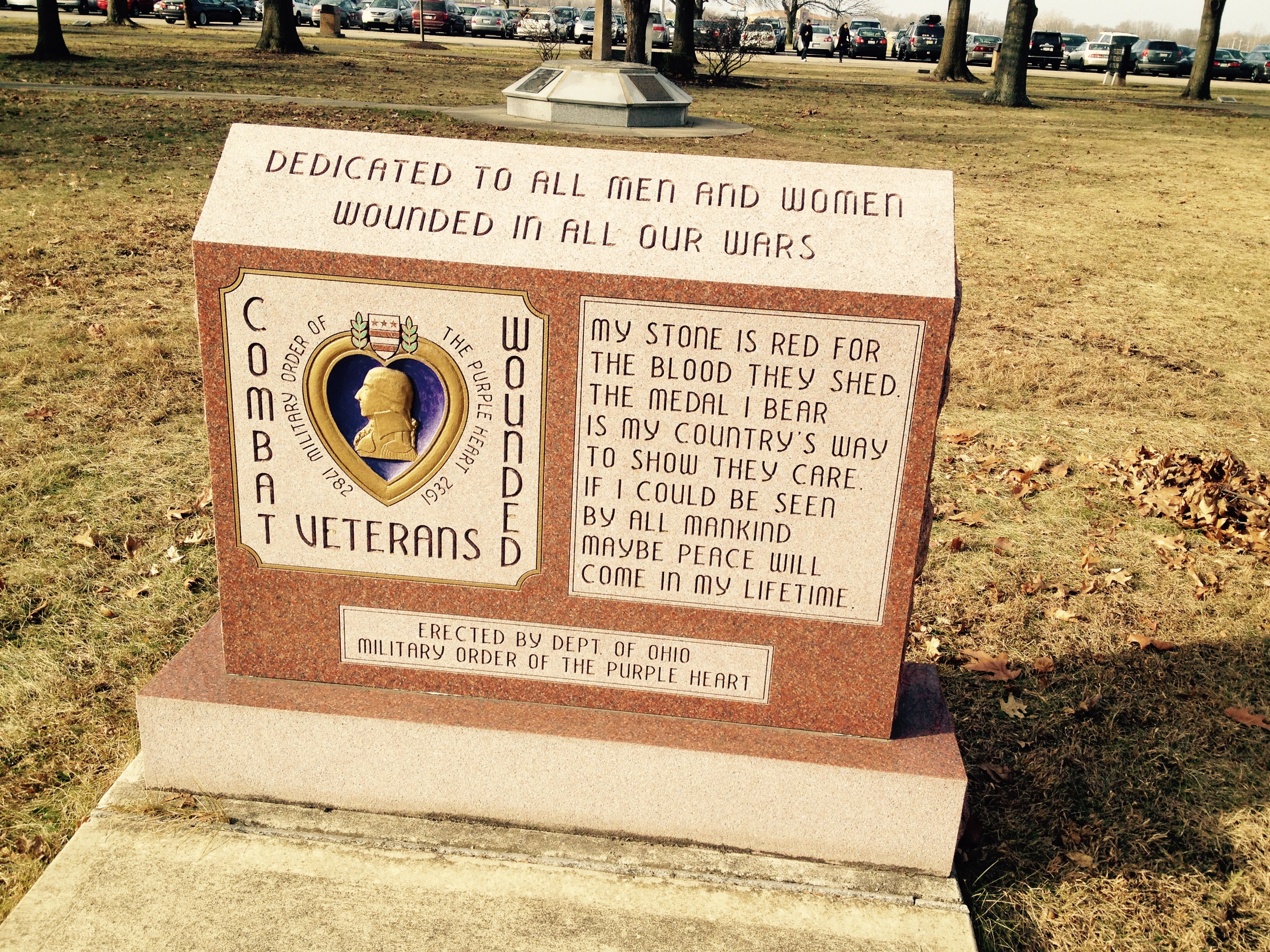
MOPH memorial at the National Museum of the United States Air Force.

=== Service Program ===
The MOPH Service Program exists to assist all U.S. Military veterans (to include members as well as nonmembers) in working with the Department of Veteran Affairs (VA) and filing claims for benefits.

=== Youth Activities Program ===
The MOPH's Youth Activities Program is designed to instill the values of patriotism and good citizenry among America's youth. This includes recognizing outstanding ROTC and JROTC leaders in the U.S. and Department of Defense dependent schools globally.

=== Veterans Affairs Volunteer Service Program ===
The Military Order of the Purple Heart's Veterans Affairs Volunteer Service (VAVS) Program operates the largest volunteer system in the U.S. Federal Government. VAVS works with the VA to supplement resources for the care, treatment and welfare of veteran patients.

=== Scholarship Program ===
The MOPH Scholarship Program is designed to provide monetary assistance for college to applicants who are either:

- a current MOPH member,
- an immediate relative of a current MOPH member, or
- an immediate relative of a service member who died either in battle or from wounds sustained in battle.

In addition, the members must:

- be a graduate or senior-year student of an accredited high school, or a full-time undergraduate student at a U.S. college, university, or trade school;
- hold at least a 2.75 GPA on an unweighted 4.0 scale; and
- be a U.S. citizen.

=== Americanism Program ===
The Americanism Program of the MOPH works with schools and outside organizations to "promote U.S. history and the quest for freedom", and is administered by the MOPH National Americanism Officer.

=== Purple Heart Trail ===
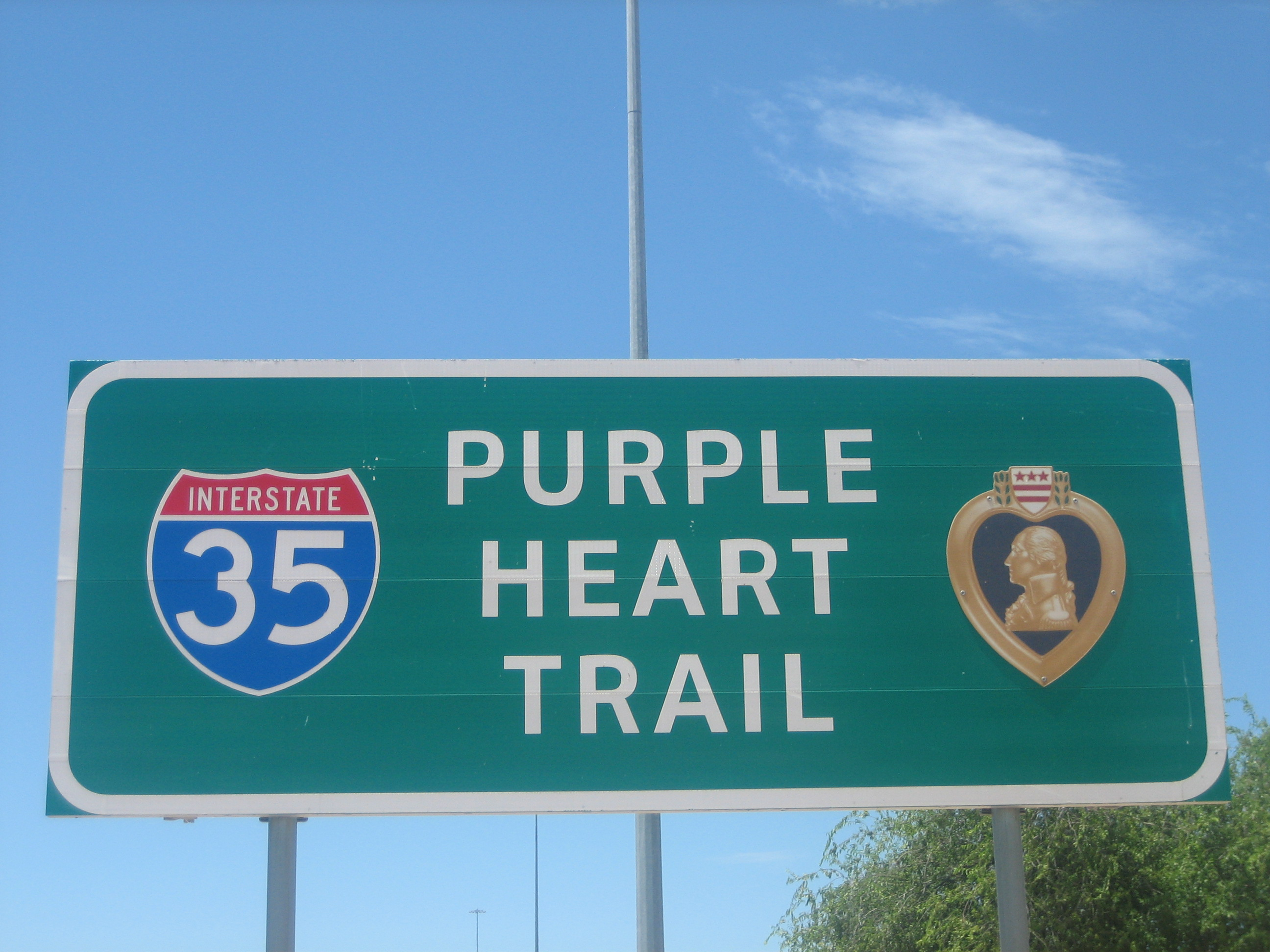
Purple Heart Trail marker on Interstate 35.

The Purple Heart Trail system, established by the MOPH in 1992, is purposed to "create a symbolic and honorary system of roads, highways, bridges, and other monuments that give tribute to the men and women who have been awarded the Purple Heart medal." The program places, where legislation is passed, signs designed to remind motorists of the freedom of their country, and of those who have paid to keep it that way. The program designates bridges, sections of highways, and other roads as part of the trail. It forms noncontinuous paths and is present in 45 states and the territory of Guam.

=== First Responder Program ===
The purpose of MOPH's First Responder Program is to honor police officers and firefighters who are killed or wounded in the line of duty. These people are honored by the creation of a commemorative plaque.

== Purple Heart Family ==
=== Military Order of the Purple Heart Auxiliary ===
The Military Order of the Purple Heart Auxiliary (MOPHA) is a sister organization of the MOPH. Its members include parents, spouses, children, widowed stepchildren, grandchildren and legally adopted children, lineal descendants of Purple Heart recipients, who may or may not be MOPH members themselves. It functions as a separate organization from the MOPH, but shares the same goals and mission.

=== Service Foundation ===
The Military Order of the Purple Heart Service Foundation is the fundraising engine of the MOPH. Its stated purpose and objectives are:

- To raise funds for service, welfare, and rehabilitation work in connection with the members of the Military Order of the Purple Heart of the U.S.A. (a congressionally chartered veterans organization), those who are eligible for membership therein, or any wounded, disabled and/or handicapped veteran, his widow, orphan or survivors.
- For the support and maintenance of liaison services in any or all offices of the United States Department of Veterans Affairs, soldier's homes or other administration of veteran's affairs wherever and whenever deemed necessary.
- For the support and maintenance of legislative service to advise and confer with the executive offices or bureaus and departments of the United States Government and Congressional committees or their members on any matters of interest and importance to disabled ex servicemen and women and particularly such matters as may properly be the subject of legislation.
- To contribute such funds to the Military Order of the Purple Heart of the U.S.A. or to independently assist in providing such services as outlined above.

==== Controversies ====
In 2007, the MOPH Service Foundation was rated "F" by the American Institute of Philanthropy (AIP) because only 32% of money raised for the organization went to charity programs. The Charity Navigator gave the MOPH a 0-star overall rating, a 0-star financial rating and a 3-star accountability and transparency rating for the 2018 fiscal year.

Also in 2007, executive director Richard Esau was fired from the Service Foundation after an audit showed money spent on possible conflict of interest projects. Money was donated to the Intrepid Museum in New York City shortly before the museum hired the daughter of a member of the Foundation's board of directors. The Foundation gave $100,000 to the Marine Corps Reserve Officers Association, where Esau had once worked and his wife still worked.

In 2010, Ret. Col. Henry Cook III sued the MOPH, saying he was wrongfully dismissed from his post as National Commander. In an affidavit submitted, Cook says his removal was "for my exposing of the mismanagement of funds and grants of "Purple Heart Dollars" on national television." The MOPH responded, "We absolutely disagree with Mr. Cook's allegations in the lawsuit, and we also disagree with Mr. Cook's effort to 'try' his case in the media. We will not otherwise comment on pending litigation, but rather will let this matter run its course through the court system." The case was dismissed in June 2011.
