= Idin =

Idin or IDIN may refer to:

- IDIN, the International Development Innovation Network
- Idin, Iran, a village in Iran

== See also ==
- Yidin (disambiguation)
- Edin
