= Calice =

Calice may refer to:

- CALICE (Calorimeter for Linear Collider Experiment), a research and development organization
- Calice (noble family), an Austrian noble family
- Calice Becker (fl. 1990–2014), French perfumer
- Calice, an alternative name for the calyx in cnidarians
- "Cálice", a song composed in 1973 by Chico Buarque and Gilberto Gil
- Calice Ligure, a commune in Italy
- Calice al Cornoviglio, municipality in the Province of La Spezia in the Italian region Liguria

== See also ==
- Chalice (disambiguation)
- Calyx (disambiguation)
