= Water for Good =

Charity in the Central African Republic

Water for Good is a non-profit organization founded in 2004 that provides clean water to communities in the Central African Republic. In 2019, the organization provided water for over 600,000 rural water users through over 1,700 unique water points. Water for Good's approach focuses on maintaining well-functionality; 95% of its wells remained fully operational in 2019. Its current focus is on ending water poverty in the Central African Republic by 2030.

== History ==
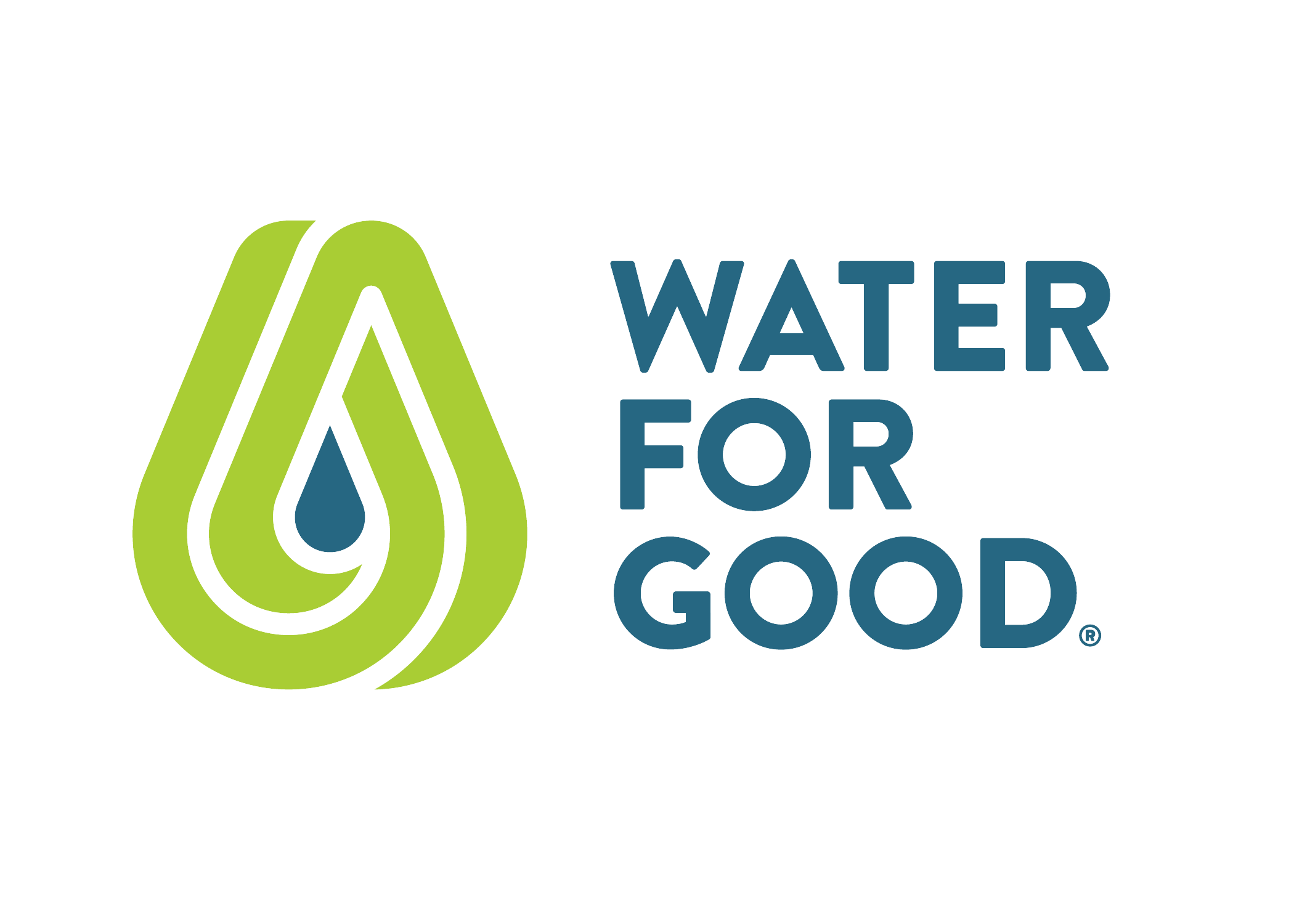
Water for Good's new logo

Water for Good was established in 2004, after taking over the assets of a foreign-owned for-profit drilling company that was seeking to exit the sector. Due to this acquisition, Water for Good had the capacities and structure of a proxy private water services provider from its inception. At that point, Water for Good also had a small hand-pump service that provided pump maintenance to communities on an ad-hoc basis. Demand for maintenance services drove Water for Good to expand rapidly between 2007 and 2011. Through the years, Water for Good's services and scale have improved; Water for Good now has 3 drilling rigs and incubated and spun-off a locally owned, for-profit drilling company.

== Approach ==
Water for Good uses circuit-rider model maintenance to keep its wells functional. This involves four maintenance teams consisting of two technicians that travel along assigned predetermined routes. Each route typically services around 300 wells. In order to accomplish its goals, the organization has divided the country into “focus regions,” specific areas where they have counted all the people and mapped out the needs of the region. As of 2019, Water for Good operates two field offices that provide logistical and supply chain support to their maintenance and drill teams.

Water for Good also runs a shortwave radio station that broadcasts across the country. Water for Good uses this service to provide messaging on water and hygiene habits.

== Financing ==
The vast majority of Water for Good’s funding comes directly from private donors. Every $5 donated to the organization provides one person in the Central African Republic with water for a year. In 2019, Water for Good received $4 million in contributions, gifts, and grants from 628 private donors and organizations. 70.5% of the charity’s total expenses are spent on the programs and services it provides.

== Reception ==
Water for Good received the Guidestar Platinum Seal of Transparency in 2020. Charity Navigator gave the charity an overall score of 84.69/100, with a financial score of 78.35/100, and a transparency score of 100/100.
