= Charity assessment =

Analysis of effectiveness of non-profit organizations

Charity assessment is the process of analysis of the goodness of a non-profit organization in financial terms. Historically, charity evaluators have focused on the question of how much of contributed funds are used for the purpose(s) claimed by the charity, while more recently some evaluators have placed an emphasis on the cost effectiveness (or impact) of charities.

== Charity watchdogs ==
A charity watchdog is a type of nonprofit organization that provides ratings of charitable groups based on how an individual charity's money is spent, how it governs itself, and how the charity protects its donors' privacy, among other criteria. Charity evaluation from these organizations has typically focused on measuring administrative and fundraising costs, salaries, and assessing how large of a proportion of a charity's budget is directly spent on impactful activities.

In 2000, Ministry Watch, an evangelical Christian organization that reviews Protestant ministries for financial accountability and transparency, was founded. Charity Navigator was launched in 2001 by John P. Dugan, a wealthy pharmaceutical executive and philanthropist. Initially, Charity Navigator provided financial ratings for 1,100 charities, and has data on 8,000 as of mid-2016.

The Toronto Star has reported on some of the difficulties and revelations of auditing charities in Canada as described by Charity Intelligence Canada (Ci). The authors call it "concerning", for example, that one in five of "Canada's top 100 charities" refused to release their full audited financial statements to Ci. Moreover, one-quarter of the "top 100 charities" hold at least three years' worth of funding (that is, they have three times their annual budget in savings) and some store as much as eight years' worth. Of the "top 100 charities", 14% exceed the guidelines set by the Canada Revenue Agency by spending more than 35% of donations on fundraising – with some spending as much as 50% of donations on fundraising.

In 2015 the United Kingdom government announced the creation of a new government-run watchdog to regulate large charities.

== Evaluation ==
=== Impact-based evaluation ===
In 2006, hedge fund employees Holden Karnofsky and Elie Hassenfeld formed an informal group with colleagues to evaluate charities based on data and performance metrics similar to those they used at the fund. The group was surprised to find the data often did not exist. The next year, Karnofsky and Hassenfeld formed GiveWell as a nonprofit to provide financial analyst services to donors. They eventually decided to rate charities based on the metric of how much money it cost to save a life.

GiveWell has focused primarily on the cost-effectiveness of the organizations that it evaluates, rather than traditional metrics such as the percentage of the organization's budget that is spent on overhead. In the first year, Karnofsky and Hassenfeld advocated that charities should generally spend more money on overhead, so that they could pay for staff and record keeping to track how effective their efforts were. This ran counter to standard ways of evaluating charities based on the ratio of overhead to funds deployed for the charity work itself.

Giving What We Can (GWWC), founded in 2009 by Toby Ord, also differed from other charity evaluators in terms of the importance given to metrics of charity performance, solely focusing on the cost-effectiveness of the charity's work. It has argued that the variance in cost-effectiveness of charities arises largely due to the variance in the nature of the causes that the charities operate in, and therefore has made evaluations across broad areas of work such as health, education, and emergency aid before comparing specific organizations. In practice, it recommends a selected few charities in the area of global health. Its work is similar to that of GiveWell. GWWC no longer evaluates charities but, like the National Philanthropic Trust, it accepts philanthropic members and helps them to donate to charities.

Charity Navigator's former CEO Ken Berger and consultant Robert M. Penna harshly criticized the idea of discriminating among cause areas for being moralistic and elitist "by weighing causes and beneficiaries against one another". Philosopher and effective altruism advocate William MacAskill defended the concept by comparing the choice to donate to an art gallery with the choice of saving a painting rather than saving people from a burning building.

In 2013 and 2014, GuideStar, BBB Wise Giving Alliance, and Charity Navigator wrote open letters urging nonprofits and donors to end the use of the overhead ratio as the sole or main indicator of a nonprofit's performance. Charity Navigator has also been working to expand its criteria to include results reporting. See Charity Navigator § Evaluation method.

=== Outcomes ===
In the United Kingdom, Charities Evaluation Services (CES), itself a charity, was established in 1990 to support the improved effectiveness of the voluntary sector. The services merged with the National Council for Voluntary Organisations in 2014. CES had a history of supporting charities in identifying their aims and objectives and the outcomes they wanted to achieve, as well as mapping how successful they were at achieving those outcomes. The "National Outcomes Programme" was delivered and delivered by CES with funding from the Big Lottery Fund between 2003 and 2009, developing a network of "outcomes champions" and supporting around 1,500 voluntary and community organisations. The programme was independently evaluated in 2006 by the Open University and in 2009 by Tribal Consulting. An "outcomes approach", focussing on the changes, benefits or other effects which happen as a result of an organisation's activities, was commended as an effective approach to performance measurement in the charity sector.

== Databases ==
=== Searchable databases of United States Internal Revenue Service Form 990 ===
- ProPublica
- Candid

=== Searchable databases of charities with scores, information and/or analysis ===
- Animal Charity Evaluators
- BBB Wise Giving Alliance
- Candid
- Charity Intelligence Canada
- Charity Navigator
- CharityWatch, formerly known as the American Institute of Philanthropy
- GiveWell
- GreatNonprofits
- ImpactMatters
- Ministry Watch

== See also ==
- Ethics of philanthropy
