= CFCA =

CFCA may refer to:

- Chicago Film Critics Association, an American film critic association.
- Christian Foundation for Children and Aging, a charity organization now known as Unbound
- European Fisheries Control Agency, previously known as the Community Fisheries Control Agency, an agency of the European Union (EU) based in Vigo, Spain.
- CFCA-FM, branded as 105.3 Kool FM, is a Canadian radio station.
- CFCA (AM), was a radio station operated by the Toronto Daily Star from 1922 to 1933.
- The Casablanca Finance City Authority (CFCA)
