= Charity Intelligence Canada =

Charity assessment organization

- Formation: 2007; 19 years ago
- Type: Charitable organization
- Legal status: Active
- Purpose: Charity assessment
- Official language: English
- Website: charityintelligence.ca

Charity Intelligence Canada is a Toronto-based nonprofit organization which posts assessments of the finances and impacts of Canadian charities on its website. Founded in 2007 by former equity analyst Kate Bahen, it uses unconventional methodologies drawn from Bahen's stock market background.

Bahen has actively and successfully promoted Charity Intelligence's profile in the news, prominently alleging wrongdoing by several mainstream charities and facing questioning before the Canadian Parliament.

== Staff and organization ==
Charity Intelligence was launched in 2008 to research charities and advise donors on charitable giving. In addition to providing advice, Charity Intelligence distributes clients' money to selected charities, handling $442,000 in donor cash transactions in 2010.

As of November 2011, Charity Intelligence had two staff members working from a condominium in Downtown Toronto, having declared $207,000 in operating costs for the previous year. By 2020, Charity Intelligence's staff had grown to about four or five members, two of which, managing director Kate Bahen and director of research Greg Thomson, also sat alongside Graeme Hepburn on its three-member board of directors.

== Top 100 Charities list ==
Charity Intelligence created its "Top 100 Charities" database when an early client donated $40,000 after asking why they didn't already have one. In November 2019, MoneySense magazine used data from Charity Intelligence and from the Canada Revenue Agency to compile its own top 100 charities to donate to in 2020.

Organizations that have received a high ranking have quoted and linked back to Charity Intelligence's website in their press releases and fund-raising efforts, as well as to promote partnerships with for-profit enterprises.

Among Charity Intelligence's most consistently favoured non-profits has been French Canadian billionaire Guy Laliberté's One Drop Foundation, which promotes clean water and sells tickets for Laliberté's for-profit enterprise Cirque du Soleil. In March 2015, One Drop and Cirque du Soleil leveraged Charity Intelligence's endorsement to partner with American multinational conglomerate Colgate-Palmolive.

Charity Intelligence has ranked the International Development and Relief Foundation, which funds projects in Gaza and Afghanistan in accordance with Islamic principles, among its top 100 Canadian charities. Charity Intelligence distanced itself from the Muslim Association of Canada, which has been accused of links to the Muslim Brotherhood, calling it "not financially transparent". Responding to an editorial by the Muslim Association of Canada's Abdul Nakus, Charity Intelligence denied accusations of anti-Muslim bias on its part or that of the Canada Revenue Agency.

== Loss of charitable status ==
On September 15, 2012, the Canada Revenue Agency revoked Charity Intelligence Canada's charitable status due to its failure to file the required annual financial report for 2011 within six months of the fiscal year. As a result, Charity Intelligence was prohibited from issuing tax receipts and was required to pay a $500 penalty before reapplying for charitable status. The Revenue Agency had notified Charity Intelligence in April 2012 to provide them more time to file, but CI did not follow through.

The Globe and Mail's Paul Waldie quotes Charity Intelligence's managing director Kate Bahen as saying, "Yes, the optics aren't good. "I'm [angry] at myself, absolutely. It's just administration, that's it," while head of donor advisory services Bri Typuc downplayed the event, saying "It was just an administrative oversight — it was just a late filing." Don McGreesh, former chairman of Imagine Canada, commented "I shook my head and laughed…Why would they, of all people, fail to file?" Association of Fundraising Professionals chair Andrea McManus observed, "Lots of charities forget [to file] and they are pilloried for it. I think that CI would view that as a lack of effective management, or a lack of transparency, and here they are in the same situation."

== Effective altruism ==
Charity Intelligence's approach has been characterized as effective altruism, a term coined by William MacAskill which attracted broader public attention with Sam Bankman-Fried and the collapse of FTX cryptocurrency exchange. CTV News described CI as is an "organization that monitors other charities to measure the impact they actually have with the donations they collect".

In a 2019 interview with The Globe and Mail, founder and managing director Kate Bahen, who had formerly worked as a Bay Street equity analyst, called effective altruism the "new frontier in charity evaluation". Baden said, "As a high-net-worth donor, you will be bombarded with asks," adding, "Despite the best of intentions, the effectiveness of our giving is often underexamined. We take a strict definition of impact. We believe it can be determined by a cost-benefit analysis, looking at the demonstrated positive effect of every dollar you donate."

Professor and philanthropy expert Devin Penner of Trent University commented, "It's inevitable that you'll get a lot of methodological biases about what impact even means. Effective altruism tends to privilege actions producing easily measurable results … so maybe a food bank seems very clear-cut, but funding something that addresses root causes of hunger may appear, on paper, less impactful simply because it's harder to measure."

In a sponsored section of the Toronto Star. director of research Greg Thomson explained, "I want to know that there has been change that has happened. It doesn't matter if people have been made happy or 1,000 people were served, because we do not know what ‘served’ means. It is digging in that one extra step and saying, ‘What happened, what was the change that happened?’"

== Methodology ==
Soon after introducing its online search engine in November 2011, Charity Intelligence Canada's methods of rating charities came under criticism from various charities and charity analysts. According to Charity Village's Andy Levy-Ajzenkopf, the site "caught the attention of the sector, not necessarily for its usefulness, but for what many sector experts are calling a naïve analysis of data and lack of knowledge of CRA guidelines and how nonprofits in Canada actually work." Association of Fundraising Professionals chair Andrea McManus credited Charity Intelligence's work with raising donor awareness, but said that its analyses can be misleading.

Charity Intelligence's founder and managing director Kate Bahen describes Charity Intelligence's approach as similar to that of a financial analyst researching stocks. On an early version of its website, Charity Intelligence said that it used "investment analysis techniques which are, by no means, the best tools, but are the only ones we knew how to use." Imagine Canada president Marcel Lauzière and former chair Don McGreech criticized the approach of treating charities as if they were corporations as overly simplistic, with Lauzière commenting, "They've taken a [data-gathering] model from the investment world, where you look at inputs and then tell your investors where to put their dollars…it's not that simple when you're looking at charities and at their outcomes and impacts."

Another common theme of criticism is that Charity Intelligence takes a generic approach which ignores the substance of charities' work. Scotiabank's head of philanthropic advisory services Malcolm Burrows commented, "I sometimes wonder how much [Ci] actually understands the nature of the sector. For one, they haven't acknowledged that there is a massive range of charities in Canada…Ci seems to want to put all of them into a single space, and I think that does a real disservice. They need to look at that before they make these huge generalizations in public…You can't have a ‘one-size-fits-all’ standard of accountability in the sector." Marcel Lauzière complained, '“It's a real disservice to Canadians because the information they're putting in front of people means nothing if it's not contextualized. It's as simple as that."

Charity Intelligence complained that 19 of 100 charities refused to provide them financial information to populate their online tool, including famous charities such as The Children's Wish Foundation, The War Amps, The Royal Ontario Museum Foundation and the Aga Khan Foundation. Aga Khan Foundation of Canada's director of public affairs, Jennifer Pepall, said that Charity Intelligence's assumptions about its finances and motivations were inaccurate. The War Amps of Canada wrote, "The numbers [Ci] associated with The War Amps are misrepresentative of our charitable activity", specifically rebutting Charity Intelligence's allegations that it uses professional fundraisers, receives government grants, solicits by phone or door-to-door, sells or trades donor's names and addresses, spends more than 10% on administration or puts funds towards long-term investments. Pointing out that its financials were publicly available in its annual T3010 returns, it called Charity Intelligence's claim that it refused to provide the information misleading. Toronto charity lawyer Mark Blumberg took an intermediate position, writing, "While I agree that larger charities that typically have audited financial statements should place them on their website, it is not a legal requirement."

== Canadian Red Cross ==
In early May 2016, a wildfire in Fort McMurray, Alberta provided an opportunity for Charity Intelligence to increase its media presence by criticizing the Canadian Red Cross, which had been coordinating relief operations in the region. Due to its national scope and decades of experience dealing with crises, the Red Cross had been institutionalized as a component of Canada's response to natural disasters, partnering with the government and receiving the majority of individual donations, which both the federal government and that of Alberta pledged to match. By May 9, the Red Cross had collected close to $60 million in private donations.

Speaking with The Globe and Mail, Bahen criticized what she called the Red Cross' "longer-term approach", saying, "When it comes to speed, the Red Cross have taken a longer-term approach compared to the front-line charities, and I do believe speed matters". The Globe and Mail's Janet McFarlan pointed out that the Red Cross had moved quickly following flooding in Calgary and southern Alberta, distributing $5.9 million of aid within the first three weeks, and that aid distribution in Fort McMurray was moving even more quickly, with large upfront sums gifted to fire victims to cover the costs of relocation. The Red Cross had distributed $50 million to evacuees by email transfers, which Red Cross CEO Conrad Sauvécalled "the most important cash transfer we have done in our history, and the fastest one" and McFarland saw as "a welcome show of nimbleness from Canada's disaster-response behemoth."

Bahen warned that Charity Intelligence would continue to criticize the Red Cross going forward, saying ""We're going to watch it very closely".

== Puck Hogs ==
Charity Intelligence's managing director Kate Bahen has called several charities "puck hog(s)", a hockey term repurposed to refer to pie chart graphs of financial data. Bahen named the charitable arms of eight National Hockey League teams, including Canucks for Kids, Jays Care, the Montreal Canadiens Children's Foundation, the Calgary Flames Foundation and the True North Youth Foundation, which she said donors should avoid due to what she characterized as insufficient transparency, high fundraising costs and excessive cash reserves.

In an October 2018 interview with CityNews, Bahen singled out the Calgary Flames Foundation, calling it a puck hog and ranking it the worst among the eight foundations. Bahen commented, "So ... be a fan, cheer for the Flames, but seriously if you are looking at giving and in your giving to have impact and really go to help people, you have so many choices in Calgary." Calgary Flames defended itself, pointing out that 50/50 charity events, in which half of fan ticket prices are donated to charity, have a 50% funding cost per dollar raised by their nature and that reserves were necessary to ensure that they could meet their commitments going forward.

On May 1, 2019, Bahen wrote a formal letter of apology to True North Youth Foundation, in which she apologized for having called it a puck hog and acknowledged that True North operates its own youth charity programs in Manitoba. Bahen wrote, "I understand that my unfortunate mischaracterization of TNYF may have left people with the impression that they should not consider supporting TNYF, and for that I want to unequivocally apologize."

== Questioning by Parliament ==
On August 6, 2020, Charity Intelligence Canada's managing director Kate Bahen and director of research Greg Thomson were questioned in a two-hour meeting of the parliamentary committee about its public statements against WE Charity. Bahen had alleged in numerous high-profile interviews that the charity was on the brink of insolvency before the Trudeau government selected it to administer the proposed Canada Student Service Grant program.

The MPs questioned Charity Intelligence's track record and their adequacy of their analyses. MP Peter Fragiskatos, referring to the small size of the organization, commented, "It's hard for me to understand how an organization of four people can judge 250 organizations on a range of criteria, delve in and offer an enormous set of judgments."

MP Francesco Sorbara asked why in 2012 CI had lost its own charitable status, to which Bahen responded, "It was a hard lesson learned well". Sorbara alleged that one of CI's team had donated what he called "substantial sums" to the Conservative Party, and asked Bahen about her formal apology to True North Youth Foundation.

MP Adam Vaughan observed that, despite Canada being a bilingual country, Charity Intelligence included only two French-language charities in its top 100 list. Bahen replied that Quebec charities rarely post financial statements on their websites.

== Ties to Conservative Party ==
Charity Intelligence Canada has ties to the Conservative Party through board member Graeme C. Hepburn and his wife Claudia, who is the niece of Galen Weston and an heir to the Weston family fortune as well as a former director and senior fellow at the right-wing Fraser Institute. Hepburn has donated to Conservatives 56 times and contributed over $43,000, his largest contribution of just under $10,000 in 2020 when Charity Intelligence was being questioned before Parliament.

In 2009, the Hepburns hosted a fundraiser for Ontario Progressive Conservative candidate Tim Hudak. In the coming years, Graeme Hepburn would donate nearly $6,200 to the Progressive Conservatives.

In 2021, Doug Ford's Progressive Conservative Ontario government appointed Claudia Hepburn to the board of the Liquor Control Board of Ontario by Order in Council. The next year, she donated $1,200 to the Progressive Conservatives in addition to nearly $24,000 she'd previously donated to federal Conservatives.

Kate Bahen also donated nearly $1,000 to the Conservative Party in 2012 and 2015.

== High salaries for nonprofit executives ==
In a June 23, 2014 interview with The Ottawa Citizen, Charity Intelligence Canada's research director Greg Thomson said that charities are best served by hiring the "best fundraisers" to lead their organizations and that annual salaries of $350,000 or more reflect their value. Thomson added, “I work for a registered salary. Would I want my salary published? No. It's a private thing.”

== See also ==
- Candid
- Charity Navigator
- Charity assessment
- Charity fraud
- CharityWatch
- GiveWell
