= NKN =

NKN may refer to:

- National Knowledge Network
- North Korean Navy
- Philanthropedia, formerly known as the Nonprofit Knowledge Network
- Supreme National Committee (Polish, Naczelny Komitet Narodowy)
