= Unbound (nonprofit organization) =

Non-profit organization

- Founded: November 20, 1981
- Founder: Bob Hentzen, Bud Hentzen, Jim Hentzen, Nadine Pearce and Jerry Tolle
- Type: Charitable organization, Non-governmental organization, Child sponsorship organization
- Purpose: Poverty eradication and global development through one-to-one sponsorship, scholarships, livelihood programs and community development initiatives
- Location(s): 1 Elmwood Avenue; Kansas City, Kansas
- Region served: Africa, Asia and Latin America
- Key people: Ashley Hufft, President and CEO
- Website: https://www.unbound.org
- Formerly called: Christian Foundation for Children and Aging

Unbound, formerly Christian Foundation for Children and Aging, is a nonprofit international development organization headquartered in Kansas City, Kansas. Unbound was founded by lay Catholics acting on the Gospel call to serve poor families and the elderly. Its sponsorship program provides direct cash transfers to sponsored members who determine how to use their cash benefits to meet their goals. Beyond basic necessities such as food, housing, clothing and access to medical care, sponsored members frequently utilize their benefits to pay for education costs or to start or expand small business ventures. Unbound sponsors have supported more than 1 million children, youth and elders in Africa, Asia and Latin America. Across 18 developing countries, it has connected 65,000 senior adults living in extreme poverty and isolation with sponsors in the United States.

== History ==
The organization was founded on November 20, 1981, by siblings Bob Hentzen, Bud Hentzen, Jim Hentzen, Nadine Pearce and their friend Jerry Tolle. The siblings wanted to start a nonprofit to honor their late parents. Bob and Jerry were both missionaries who had witnessed firsthand the effects of poverty in developing countries, so they formed a sponsorship organization based on Catholic social teaching.

The first headquarters was in Hentzen's basement in Kansas City, Missouri.

Over 1 million children, youth and elders and their families have been served through the sponsorship program.

On January 1, 2014, the name of the organization was changed to Unbound. To explain the planned name change, Hentzen said in 2013, "We walk side by side with people who dream of freeing themselves from poverty, as they strive to achieve self-sufficiency and build strong communities. Our new name sums up our work." The former president and CEO, Scott Wasserman, said that rather than a bunch of initials, what "Bob wanted was a single word capturing the essence of Catholic social teaching and empowering the poor."

Hentzen died in October 2013 at the age of 77, and the National Catholic Reporter eulogized his work.

== Programs ==
=== Sponsorship Program ===
Unbound uses a one-to-one sponsorship model of direct support. Its sponsorship program aims to help families living in extreme poverty by connecting them with sponsors. Sponsorship requires a $40 monthly commitment to help fund basic necessities and, in many instances, livelihood programs to help families become self-sustaining.

Sponsors have the opportunity to offer encouragement and support for their sponsored friends through the exchange of letters and photos. They also may choose to travel on Unbound Awareness Trips to meet their sponsored friends, learn about their lives and see how contributions are used.

Ninety-eight percent of Unbound sponsored friends participate in programs that deliver benefits through direct cash transfers.

=== Unbound Scholarship Program ===
The Unbound Scholarship Program provides educational scholarships to students pursuing secondary, post-secondary and vocational school. Scholarships are used for tuition, transportation, school supplies, books and technology. Recipients are selected by local Unbound staff based on economic need, commitment to completing their education, demonstrated leadership potential and interest in community service. Recipients perform service projects as a requirement of the program.

== Financials and Ratings ==
More than 91% of Unbound's expenses went toward program support in 2024.

Charity Navigator gives Unbound a 4-star rating based on program expenses, administrative expenses, fundraising expenses and operating efficiency.

The CharityWatch gives Unbound an A+ rating in its Charity Rating Guide. It is the only child sponsorship organization to hold this rating from the institute.

Unbound meets all 20 standards established by the Better Business Bureau Wise Giving Alliance.

Unbound receives the distinction of Top-Rated Nonprofit from Great Nonprofits, based on reviews from people who donate to or benefit from nonprofit organizations.

Unbound holds the Platinum GuideStar Nonprofit Profile Seal of Transparency, the highest level of recognition offered by GuideStar.

== Countries served ==
Unbound currently works with children and elders in Africa, Asia and Latin America.

Mexico and the Caribbean	Central America	South America	Africa	Asia
Mexico	Costa Rica	Bolivia	Kenya	India
	El Salvador	Colombia	Uganda	Philippines
	Honduras	Ecuador	Tanzania	
	Guatemala	Peru	Madagascar	
			Rwanda	
