= Tvind =

Private education organization in Denmark

Coordinates: 56.256°N 8.278°E

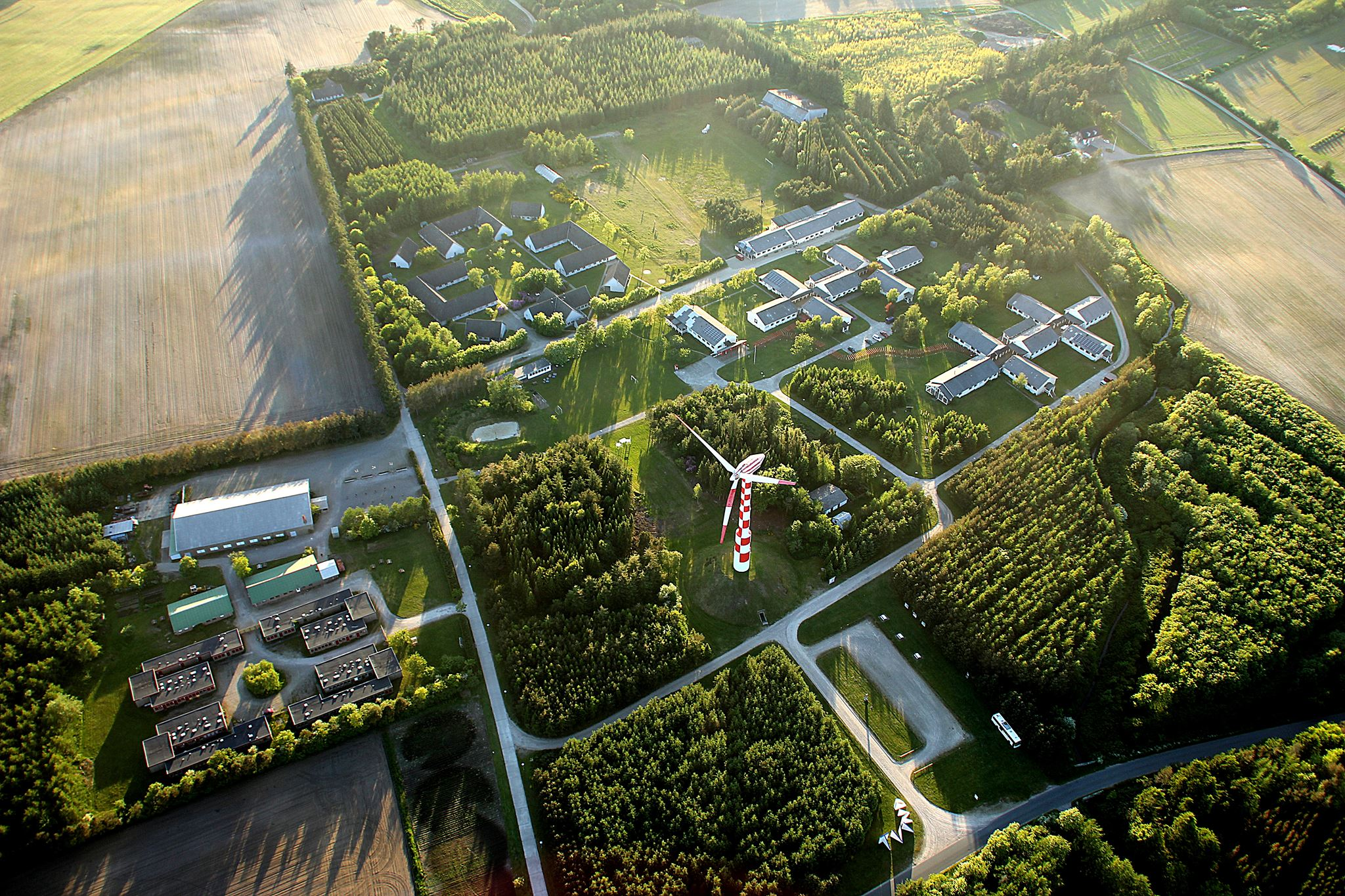
Tvind School Center in Ulfborg seen from a hot air balloon.

Tvind is the informal name of a confederation of private schools, humanitarian organizations, and businesses, founded as an alternative education school in Denmark circa 1970. The organization is controversial in Denmark, where it runs a number of schools primarily for troubled youth. Some former students and employees have described the organization and its controlling body, the Teachers Group, as a political cult.

Investigations by journalists and law-enforcement agencies have suggested the presence of an extensive money-laundering network within the group's commercial and non-profit ventures, wherein charitable funds are diverted to private businesses and individuals, including several of the group's leaders. In 2013, several of Tvind's senior members were sentenced in absentia to prison in Denmark for suspected tax evasion and embezzlement, after an earlier acquittal. As of August 2016, the defendants, who are wanted by Interpol, are believed to be hiding in Mexico.

== Overview ==
Following a provision of the Danish constitution that allows any group to form a school and receive government funding, Tvind has founded numerous private schools across Denmark. According to The Copenhagen Post,

"Debate has raged for years as to whether Tvind, the western Jutland school that reformed the Danish educational system throughout the ‘70s and ‘80s is a boon to the country‘s school system or little more than a hippie cult that has diminished the quality of education".

Over time, the group's financial dealings grew to encompass various non-profit and commercial enterprises such as African AIDS work, South American plantations and second-hand clothing dealers.

Some former members of the group have made allegations that Tvind is run as an authoritarian cult, controlled by an inner circle known as the "Teachers Group". Its purported leader, Mogens Amdi Petersen, born 9 January 1939 in Tønder, had been in hiding since the 1970s and reappeared in 2002 when apprehended on charges of fraud and tax evasion. As of August 2016, Petersen and a group of the organization's leaders are facing charges of fraud in Denmark.

== History ==
Tvind was founded c. 1970 by Petersen, then a young, radical idealist. Petersen is said to have collected about 40 followers and established a government-funded alternative school system for troubled youth in Denmark.

In 1972 the Tvind base was founded in West Jutland on a plot of farming land called Tvind, where several schools were built as well as a teachers training college. At that time, all of Tvind's schools received public subsidies in accordance with the very liberal education laws in Denmark.

It is located in the countryside near Ulfborg in Western Jutland, Denmark - 12 km from the North Sea.

=== 1970s and 1980s ===
More 'Tvind Schools' began to emerge and after 25 years more than 30 schools have been established all over Denmark and some abroad. An estimated 40,000 children and adults have attended Tvind Schools since the first school was established in 1970.

Tvind soon became a popular center for youth counter culture in the 1970s and 1980s. The world's largest electricity producing turbine, known as Tvindkraft or Tvind Power, was constructed on the school grounds in Tvind in the mid-1970s in a collaboration between volunteers, teachers and students. In 2008, The European Association for Renewable Energy awarded Tvind the European Solar Prize for education, in recognition of the effort of planning and building the turbine in the 1970s.

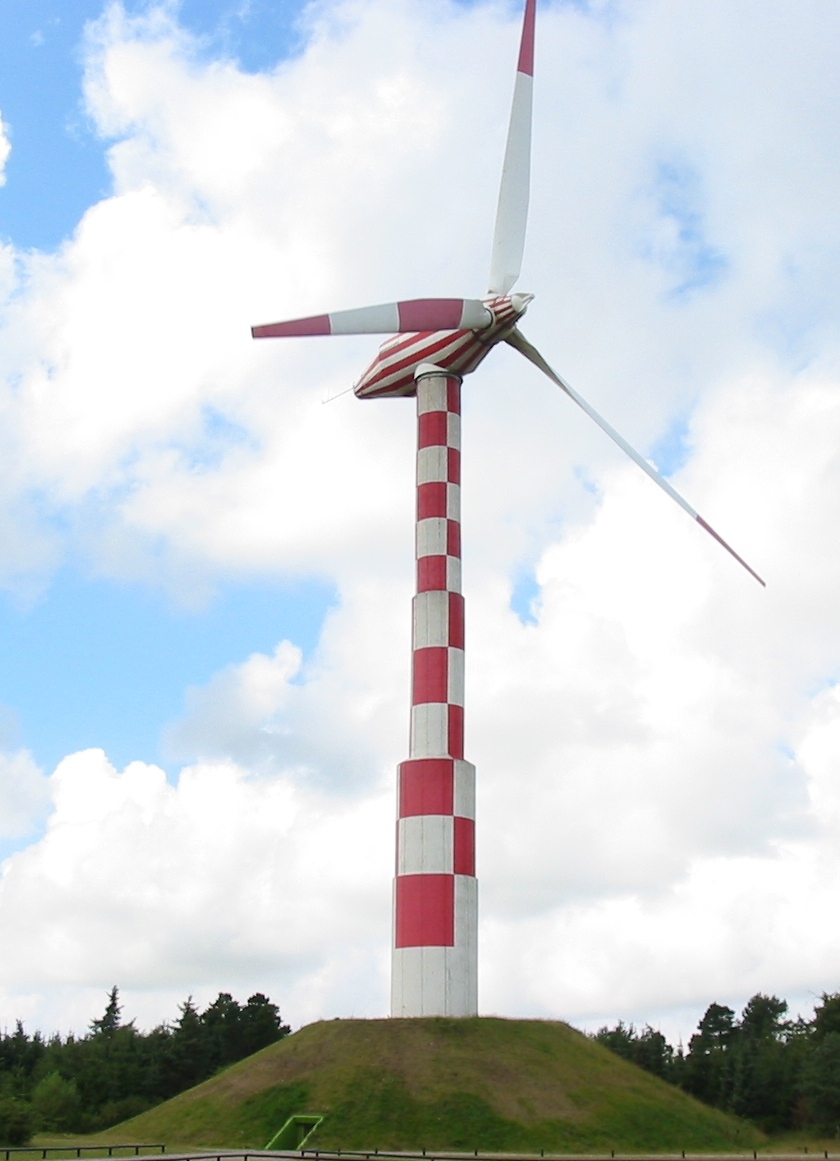
The wind turbine at Tvind

Tvindkraft has since supplied the energy needed for the schools in Tvind. The building of Tvindkraft inspired and gave rise to a growing wind turbine industry in Denmark.

=== Danish government subsidies, Special Act and Danish Supreme Court decision ===
From 1970 to 1996, the Tvind schools received government financial support and supervision in accordance with Danish laws for private schools. Official support of The Necessary Teacher Training College, Tvind's volunteer training school in Denmark, had ended four years earlier, in 1992.

A Special Act passed in 1996 by the Danish Parliament discontinued the official support beginning January 1, 1997. This act prevented the Tvind schools from receiving such support under the general rules, which they otherwise would have been entitled to.

In 1999, the Danish Supreme Court — in a unanimous, 11 judge ruling — set aside the Special Act on the grounds that it had circumvented the Danish Constitution. The controversial decision was the first time in the history of Denmark's Constitution that the Supreme Court had ever discarded an act as being unconstitutional.

Despite the court's ruling, the Tvind schools never regained financial support from the Danish government.

In the schools for children and youngsters the student base was shifted so that the focus was on students who have been subjected to abuse, involved with alcohol abuse or other drug abuse, being from immigrant or refugee families with conflict ridden background or being orphans, etc. Financial support for training and education of such young people are available from the social services of the municipalities in Denmark, which provide the funds for the school fees and boarding fees. Those schools were named "The Small Schools" because of many smaller units with different programs.

== Schools ==
=== The Travelling Folk High Schools ===
One type of Tvind institution, the "travelling folk high schools", were created to send teachers and students together to Third World countries with the ambition of improving living standards of the poor. Now collectively known as the "DRH Movement" (Den Rejsende Højskole in Danish), these schools train volunteers for humanitarian work overseas. Some former DRH Movement students say that even after paying tuition of several thousand dollars, they were required to spend much of their time trying to raise yet more money by what some of them call begging in the streets. Students also complain that the training they received is not recognised by governments or aid agencies.

In Denmark, these Folk High Schools are public institutions subsidized and supported by the Ministry of Education.

Special programs were established in the late 1970s and the beginning 1980s for young people from the so-called Frontline States in Southern Africa. The programs emphasized on vocational skills. Students from Zimbabwe, South Africa, Mozambique, Angola, Namibia and Guinea Bissau completed such programs.

=== Necessary Teachers Training College ===
The Necessary Teachers Training College (Det Nødvendige Seminarium or DNS) was established in 1972. The institution's program is not accredited by the Danish Ministry of Higher Education and Science, and does not grant recognized teaching credentials within Denmark or the European Union.

=== The Continuation Schools and the Free Schools ===
The first Continuation School for students from 14 to 18 years old was established in Tvind in 1974 and was followed by 6 other continuation schools and 6 international continuation schools with government financial support and supervision. The first International Continuation School received financial support from the EU Commission as well. The First Free School for pupils from 7–16 years old was established in 1976 and was followed by 6 other Free Schools, 5 of them boarding schools. These two school types were discontinued after the Government withdrew its financial support from 1997.

=== The Small Schools and The Second Generation School Cooperation ===
In 1979, the Small Schools started operations. Many of the students have experienced neglect and other difficult circumstances such as physical abuse and parental alcoholism. Many are "runaways". The Small School at Red House near Buxton operated from 1984 to 1998 with local councils paying 700 pounds a week for the school to house troubled youngsters. More than a dozen former pupils have alleged that they were sexually and physically abused at the school and have even provided photographic evidence. A former Tvind head teacher described the English Small Schools as a "money machine" and alleged that Tvind used the schools to funnel money out of the UK to fund the extravagant lifestyles of Tvind's leaders. The English Small Schools were closed by inspectors after a 1997 Charity Commission report exposed the financial malfeasance that was taking place. In 2001 a former student successfully sued his child services department for sending him to a Small School and another abusive children's home.

== Humana People to People ==
In 1977, Tvind members founded the International Humana People to People Movement to oversee several self-described humanitarian aid projects in the Third World. In Scandinavia the group is known as "Ulandshjælp fra Folk til Folk" (UFF). Headquartered in Zimbabwe, Humana People to People claims on its website to be a "network of non-profit aid organizations in Europe, North America, Africa, Asia and Latin America, all working in the field of international solidarity, cooperation and development.".

=== Critique ===
Several programmes run by Humana People to People member organisations have been criticised by former volunteers as being ineffective, culturally insensitive, environmentally unsustainable and even abusive toward volunteers. Humana People to People volunteers who are Teachers Group members are forced to donate up to 50% of their salary to fund what the Teachers Group calls the "common economy". Humana employees, many of them from vulnerable backgrounds, are told that joining the Teachers Group is the only way to ensure job security. This practice has caused UNICEF to pull all funding from the Humana project. High ranking positions within Humana People to People are reserved for Teachers Group members.

Tvind has also been linked to the College for International Co-operation and Development (CICD), located in Hull, East Yorkshire, England. Part of Tvind's "DRH Movement", this residential college advertises widely on the Internet as providing training for young people wishing to volunteer in Africa. However, many former CICD students have complained about poor teaching, low-grade facilities, and being obliged to work long, unpaid hours collecting and sorting used clothes for commercial companies allegedly owned by Tvind. CICD has hundreds of clothes collection boxes across Northern England.

=== Used clothes collection ===
Tvind and Humana People to People are alleged to be behind a group of similar organisations that have placed tens of thousands of used clothes collection bins throughout the United States and Western Europe. Advertised as supporting environmental causes, the organizations behind the bins instead sell the clothes and channel the profits to a small circle of Tvind leaders, say investigators. Humana People-to-People's donation bins can be found in many European countries except in Scandinavia, where clothes are collected under the name UFF.

In the UK, clothes collection organisations said to be tied to Tvind include the for-profit companies Green World Recycling, Planet Aid UK and Development Aid from People to People UK (DAPP-UK).

According to the British Broadcasting Corporation, the charitable organization Development Aid from People to People (DAPP) is controlled by the Teachers Group. DAPP has been paid millions by the UK and US government for its work in Africa. An August 2016 report by the BBC, in partnership with the Center for Investigative Reporting, led the United Kingdom Department for International Development to suspend payments as well.

In 2019 Ulla Carina Bolin (named "Karin Bolin"), CEO and President of Humana People to People Italia, publicly admitted to be an active member of Teachers Group and expressed solidarity to the fugitive Amdi Petersen, saying that the allegations against him are not really serious. Humana People to People Italia is the bigger player in the Italian sector of used clothes collection.

In the United States, the non-profits Planet Aid and Gaia Movement Living Earth Green World Action and the for-profit company USAgain, which have each placed thousands of clothes drop-off bins nationwide, have attracted both favorable and unfavourable publicity over their business. Planet Aid is a member of the Humana People to People Federation and has supported these projects economically. Planet Aid has stated that "less than 5%" of the 250 people working with the company belong to the Tvind Teachers Group. Some executives in USAgain have also stated that they personally belong to the group.

There are three other alleged Tvind-run clothes-collecting groups in the U.S., two of which are DRH Movement schools claiming to train volunteers for related humanitarian projects overseas through the Institute for International Cooperation and Development (IICD), located in Williamstown, Massachusetts and in Dowagiac, Michigan. Former students of IICD have reported being obliged to endure substandard living conditions, unreasonable work hours, bullying, and a "cult-like" atmosphere. Volunteers have also reported that they received little to no training, being instead required to solicit donations door-to-door, sell postcards on the street, and provide labour to Tvind-owned businesses under the guise of raising funds to support their overseas projects. Others recalled the aid programs themselves being fraught with mismanagement and even disastrous results. In June 2013, The two IICD schools changed their name to One World Center.

A third DRH Movement school in the U.S., Campus California, had been located in Etna, California, but reportedly closed under mysterious circumstances in December 2009. The organisation has since relocated to Richmond, California, where it has continued with its used clothes collection bin operation in the San Francisco Bay Area and the Central Valley. In November 2014, Campus California announced its new name, Recycle for Change.

== Criminal investigations ==
Tvind has historically received a great deal of interest from both media and officials. Minister of Education Ole Vig and the Parliament attempted to tighten the legislation in order to prevent the Tvind Schools from receiving public funds. The Danish Supreme Court declared such attempts as contrary to the Danish Constitution. Vig was advised by the National Audit Office and the Parliament's Barrister (Kammeradvokaten) to raise the case accusing Tvind School Center of fraud. Around two years later, the Public Prosecutor in Aalborg dismissed the case - the materials did not contain sufficient evidence for prosecution.

According to a 2001 case summary by Danish police and Denmark's Public Prosecutor for Serious Economic Crime, Tvind's scope had by 1992 "expanded far beyond pure school activities". Such activities were said to include the ownership of Third World fruit plantations, farms, shoe factories and sawmills, aid agencies, used clothing shops as well as the leasing of property, ships and containers. Numerous media reports as well as investigations by European governments suggest that Tvind's alleged controlling body, the Teachers Group, is a political cult involved in criminal financial activities. In Denmark, Teachers Group leaders have been prosecuted for serious financial crimes, with two convictions in separate trials, in 2006 and 2009 respectively.

British journalist Michael Durham has tracked the "many interconnected businesses, properties and charitable operations around the world" owned by Tvind/TG.

Annually, alleged Tvind-run non-profit companies in the United States, Europe and elsewhere receive millions of dollars in governmental and private-sector funding intended for Tvind-related humanitarian programmes in Africa and other areas of the Third World. Danish prosecutors have claimed that Tvind members instead channelled a portion of funds earmarked for charitable use into purchases of property and luxury items, offshore tax havens and private business investments, all controlled by Tvind's top leaders.

An FBI investigation into Tvind stated that "Tvind derives income from the creation of developmental aid organizations. Money is raised by the collection of used clothes. The clothes are recycled and sold in third world countries. The proceeds are sent to charitable trust funds established in off shore tax havens. [...] In each of these organizations the funds are ultimately controlled by captioned subjects who divert the money for personal use. Little to no money goes to the charities".

Danish media begun to air stories accusing Tvind of fraud as early as the late 1970s. Petersen, claiming to be a target for the SIS and the CIA, disappeared in 1979, and was not seen again for the next 22 years. He is alleged to have continued to covertly run his organisation from various locations, subverting Tvind's original humanitarian mission to create a lucrative financial web by diverting charitable funds into private coffers. Petersen's network soon became a business empire based on property and used clothes collection. Tvind has since then grown into a global conglomerate with numerous profit-motivated enterprises reportedly worth hundreds of millions of dollars. Its interests range from farming and timber to property, retail clothing and furniture, with businesses in Europe, the United States, Brazil, Belize, Ecuador, Malaysia and China.

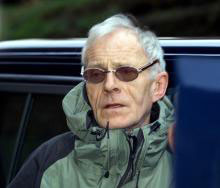
Mogens Amdi Petersen in 2002

In February 2002, FBI agents in the U.S. arrested Amdi Petersen between international flights at Los Angeles International Airport. An arrest warrant for Petersen had been issued in 2000 by the international police agency Interpol. A federal judge extradited Petersen to Denmark, where he and his top assistants faced trial for a multimillion-dollar tax fraud and embezzlement scheme.

The trial began in 2003. Three years later, on August 31, 2006, Petersen, Tvind spokesperson Poul Jørgensen, top aides Kirsten Larsen and Ruth Sejerøe-Olsen, former chair of Tvind's 'Humanitarian Foundation' Bodil Ross Sørensen, financial director Marlene Gunst, and lawyer Kirsten Fuglsbjerg (also known as 'Christie Pipps') were all acquitted of charges. Another former chair of Tvind's Humanitarian Foundation, Sten Byrner, was found guilty of fraud and given a one-year conditional sentence.

The Public Prosecutor in Denmark immediately appealed the verdict to a higher court. Petersen and four of his co-defendants fled Denmark shortly the lower court's acquittal. Poul Jørgensen, who had remained in Denmark, was found guilty of tax fraud and embezzlement in January 2009, and sentenced to two and a half years imprisonment. According to Danish prosecutors, Jørgensen diverted millions of dollars earmarked for charitable use into private businesses owned by Tvind leaders. In 2013, Petersen and four others were sentenced in absentia to a year in prison for their suspected role in embezzling millions of Danish kroner from the Tvind Humanitarian Fund, an outgrowth of the Tvind schools. Danish police then instituted procedures for issuing an international arrest warrant, according to Jens Madsen, head of "Bagmandspolitiet", the Danish national financial crimes division. As of August 2016, the five, who are wanted by the police agency Interpol, are believed to have taken refuge in a coastal resort compound in Mexico.
