= Families Forward =

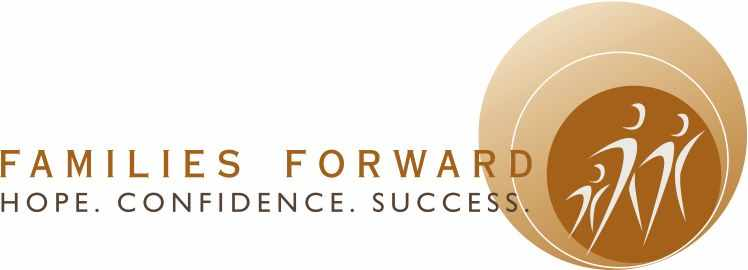
- Formation: 1984
- Headquarters: Irvine, California, U.S.
- Members: 200 volunteers, plus full-time and part-time staff
- Executive Director: Margie Wakeham
- Website: Families-Forward.org

Families Forward is an Irvine, California based nonprofit organization founded in 1984 by a group of community members in collaboration with the City of Irvine and the Irvine Company, with the goal of providing affordable housing for homeless and at-risk families. The agency began with only five apartment units and one part-time counselor. Families Forward has grown and now has housing units across Orange County, a food pantry providing food for nearly 7,000 people per year, and offers services to prevent homelessness in Orange County, California.

Families Forward's mission is to help families in need achieve and maintain self-sufficiency through housing, counseling, education and other support services.

The organization has over 200 volunteers, in addition to full-time and part-time employees.

Families Forward was awarded four stars by nonprofit evaluator Charity Navigator for fiscal responsibility for the last 7 years, placing them in the top 3% of rated charities nationwide, noting that 90% of donations are spent on its programs and services.

== Awards and recognition ==
- In September, 2010 Families Forward was voted among the best places to volunteer in Orange County.
- In November, 2010 Charity Navigator awarded Families Forward four stars for its fiscal responsibility, noting that 86.8% of donations are spent on its programs and services.
- In December 2011, Families Forward was featured on an episode of Dr. Phil, where he discussed homelessness and the efforts of organizations to address this problem.
- In January 2013, Families Forward's board received Orange County, CA-based non-profit services group OneOC's Giving is Living award, for dedicated and innovative governance.
- In November 2013, founder and executive director Margie Wakeham was awarded the Outstanding Founder award by the Orange County chapter of the National Association of Fundraisers, for her 29 years of philanthropic leadership.
