= Ann Mei Chang =

Non-profit organization executive

Ann Mei Chang (born May 20, 1967) is the CEO of non-profit organization Candid. She is a technology expert, global development advocate, author, and public speaker.

== Career ==
Chang began her career as a technology executive in the Silicon Valley, with companies including Apple, Intuit, and a few startups. She served for 8 years as a Senior Engineering Director at Google where she also led the product development team for Emerging Markets.

After gaining over 20 years experience in Silicon Valley, Chang moved to the social and public sector. She was appointed as the Chief Innovation Officer at Mercy Corps in 2013. During this time she also served as the Senior Advisor for Women and Technology in the Secretary's Office of Global Women's Issues at the U.S. Department of State, where she was part of the committee that conceived and launched the Alliance for Affordable Internet aimed at expanding Internet access in developing countries.

She held the position of the chief innovation officer and executive director of the U.S. Global Development Lab at USAID. She has been Chief Innovation Officer for the Pete for America organization, the 2020 presidential campaign for Pete Buttigieg, the first openly gay presidential candidate.

Chang was recognized as one of the 'Women In the World: 125 Women of Impact for 2013' by Newsweek. In June 2019 she was named one of the most powerful LGBTQ+ people in tech.

In June 2019, Chang became the chief innovations officer in the Pete for America organisation.

Since October, 2021, Chang leads the non-profit organization Candid as CEO.

== Education ==
Chang received a Bachelor of Science degree from Stanford University, as part of the first year of undergraduate students to major in computer science. She is a member of the 2011 class of Henry Crown Fellows at the Aspen Institute.

== Books and public speaking ==
Chang has written about the use of best practices from her experience in the Silicon Valley to benefit social causes in her book Lean Impact: How to Innovate for Radically Greater Social Good.

She has also extended her advocacy through public speaking, including at conferences such as TedX-MidAtlantic and Lesbians Who Tech. She has spoken about how being a lesbian made it easier to work in the male-dominated field of technology in the Silicon Valley as it "diffused the sexual tension thing."
