= Chalice (disambiguation) =

A chalice is a goblet or footed cup intended to hold a drink.

Chalice may also refer to:

- Holy Chalice, the vessel which Jesus used at the Last Supper to serve the wine
- Chalice (pipe), a type of smoking pipe
- Chalice (novel), a 2008 novel by Robin McKinley
- Chalice (superhero character), a transgender superhero character
- The Chalice and the Blade, a book by Riane Eisler
- Flaming chalice, the most widely used symbol of both Unitarianism and Unitarian Universalism
- Kamen Rider Chalice, a character from Kamen Rider Blade
- The Chalice, a public sculpture by Neil Dawson in Cathedral Square, Christchurch, New Zealand
- Chalice International, a Canadian international aid charity

== Music ==
- Chalice (band), a Gothic-doom metal band from Adelaide, South Australia
- Chalice (reggae band), a Jamaican reggae band featuring guitarist Wayne Armond
- Chalice (singer), a stage name of Estonian singer and rapper Jarek Kasar
- Chalice (record label), a defunct Britain vanity record label created by Coil
