= ImpactMatters =

American charity assessment organization

ImpactMatters was an American charity assessment organization that evaluates the impact of charitable organizations.

== History ==
ImpactMatters was founded in 2015 by Dean Karlan and Elijah Goldberg at Yale University and launched its charity assessment tool in November 2019. Counter to other evaluators which focus on overhead costs, ImpactMatters instead prioritized cost-effectiveness analysis. Funding for the organization came from the Bill & Melinda Gates Foundation, Goldsmith Foundation, Mulago Foundation, StickK and other private donors.

In October 2020, ImpactMatters announced their acquisition by Charity Navigator.

== See also ==
- Charity Navigator
- Effective altruism
- GiveWell
