= GreatNonprofits =

Charity review website

GreatNonprofits is a 501(c)(3) registered non-profit organization based in the United States with a website where donors, volunteers, and clients review and share their experiences of charitable organizations, essentially providing crowdsourced information about the reputability of these organizations. It was founded in 2007 by Perla Ni and has an operating budget of an estimated $750,000.

GreatNonprofits grants "Top-Rated" ranking to organizations that have maintained an average rating of 4.5 stars throughout the year. The group's website has ratings on around 6,500 nonprofits.

== Reception ==
Charity Navigator has rated GreatNonprofits as "needs improvement", noting its lack of financial and tax documents.

CharityWatch criticized GreatNonprofit's methodology, noting that crowdsourcing reviews generates ratings from those who are not informed on the charity's efficacy or who are directly involved with the charity, and that by "encouraging groups to drum up glowing reviews from their supporters, GreatNonprofits is letting charities know how easily they can drown out their critics and receive high ratings. This may be good for charities, but it is not helpful for donors".

== Media coverage ==
GreatNonprofits has been covered in The Economist, Christian Science Monitor, Good Magazine, and other news sources.

== See also ==
- Candid
- Charity Navigator
- GiveWell
- Giving What We Can
