= Chalice (Canada) =

Canada-based Catholic international aid charity

- Formation: 1996; 30 years ago
- Founder: Fr. Patrick Cosgrove
- Type: International non-governmental organization
- Headquarters: Bedford, Nova Scotia
- Region served: Worldwide
- Website: https://chalice.ca

Chalice is a Catholic international aid charity focused on child, family, and community development headquartered in Bedford, Nova Scotia.

== Organization ==
Chalice is a Canadian, Catholic child sponsorship organization that supports vulnerable children in developing countries to complete their education.

Currently, Chalice operates 52 sites throughout Bolivia, Chile, Ghana, Guatemala, Haiti, India, Kenya, Paraguay, Peru, Philippines, Tanzania, Ukraine, and Zambia.

Through collaboration and communication with their families, sponsored children and their families receive assistance for nutrition, education, and health care.

In the organization, through community projects, the partners oversee the building or expansion of schools, clinics, hospitals, orphanages, homes, and other construction projects.

Also, through human development projects facilitated by partners, Chalice offers skills training, training for job search preparation, and training for starting a small business.

== History ==
Chalice was founded in 1996 by Father Patrick ‘Pat’ Cosgrove, who has served as a diocesan priest of the Archdiocese of Halifax-Yarmouth since 1985.

In 1992 a friend visited Cosgrove and invited him to become involved with the American Catholic sponsorship organization Christian Foundation for Children and Aging (CFCA). Cosgrove accepted an invitation to join the board of directors of CFCA Canada.

In 1996, Cosgrove's operations became an autonomous child sponsorship charity, called Christian Child Care International, later renamed in 2007 to Chalice Canada. Chalice moved to its permanent national headquarters in Bedford, Nova Scotia, in the winter of 2016.

Chalice Inc. began operations in the United States in July 2017. Chalice Inc. is headquartered in Chicago, Illinois.

In May 2021, Chalice was constituted as a Private Association of the Faithful by Archbishop Brian Dunn of the Diocese of Halifax-Yarmouth.

== Charitable model ==
Chalice operates on a Family Funding sponsorship model that is unique in Canada. Chalice sponsorship pairs one child with one sponsor. Each child’s parent or guardian joins a community group, opens a bank account, and receives financial literacy training to manage their child's funds, prioritizing education fees. Each month, parents meet in ‘family circles’ of about 20 with a Chalice field worker. At these meetings, they account for their spending, create group savings, engage in microloans, and form small businesses. These meetings are also opportunities for Chalice staff to conduct educational sessions in topics related to parenting, health and hygiene, nutrition, and other subjects that are relevant to their groups.

== Awards ==
- Charity Intelligence 2022 Top Rated Charities
- Charity Intelligence 2021 Top Rated Charities: #3 International Aid
- Maclean's Canada's Best Charities 2020: #5
- MoneySense Canada’s top-rated charities 2020
- The Globe and Mail 2018 Top 100 Nonprofit Organizations
- MoneySense Canada's Top Rated Charities 2017 - #5 International Aid & Development
- MoneySense Top Charities in Canada 2018 - #4 International Aid
