= Child sponsorship =

Child sponsorship is a type of fundraising in which a charitable organization associates a donor sponsor with a particular child beneficiary. The sponsor receives updates from the child, typically including photos and translated letters, which help create the feeling of a personal relationship with the child. The donated funds are often not spent specifically on the sponsored child, but pooled with other contributions to fund a variety of education, health, security, infrastructure, or other projects in the child's community or country. One estimate is that over 9 million children are given over US $5 billion by child sponsorship programs. Other sources state the amount of child sponsorship funding is closer to US $3 billion per year.

== History ==
Save the Children was the first child sponsorship organization, beginning individual child sponsorship in 1920 to help children following World War I. Children International began as a child sponsorship charity in 1936. Plan International (1937) and ChildFund (1938) followed suit, as the concept grew in popularity. In response to the unmet needs of children during World War II, Save the Children USA launched a sponsorship program to benefit British war orphans in 1940. Chalice International, since 1996, uses funds from child and elderly sponsorship to implement direct family funding in 15 countries. In 2007, JAAGO Foundation started a child sponsorship program locally in Bangladesh.

== Impact ==
A 2017 study found that "international child sponsorship increased monthly income by $13–17 over an untreated baseline of $75, principally from inducing higher future labor market participation. We find evidence for positive impacts on dwelling quality in adulthood and modest evidence of impacts on ownership of consumer durables in adulthood, limited to increased ownership of mobile phones. Finally, our results also show modest effects of child sponsorship on childbearing in adulthood."

== Criticisms ==
Critics have argued that child sponsorship could alienate the relatively privileged sponsored children from their peers and may perpetuate harmful stereotypes about third-world citizens being helpless. They also claim that child sponsorship causes cultural confusion and unrealistic aspirations on the part of the recipient, and that child sponsorship is expensive to administer. This latter problem has led some charities to offer information about a "typical" child to sponsors rather than one specifically supported by the sponsor. In some cases charities have been caught sending forged updates from deceased children.

Concerning the organization Save the Children, the Effective altruism community generally opposes their child sponsorship as a type of donor illusion. Givewell describes sponsorship thus:

Illusion: through an organization such as Save the Children, your money supports a specific child. Reality: as Save the Children now discloses, “Your sponsorship contributions are not given directly to a child. Instead, your contributions are pooled with those of other sponsors to provide community-based programming for all eligible children in the area.”

More generally, David Roodman says that child sponsorship creates "a tension between creating the psychological experience of connection that raised money and the realities of fighting poverty".

In 2018, then President/CEO of Food for the Hungry, Gary Edmonds, responded to a study funded by Grey Matter Research and Opinions4Good, which shared that 54% of child sponsorship donors believed it to be "mostly a gimmick to get donations," and that donations do not directly affect the sponsored child. The study said, "“Three out of four donors believe that despite what sponsorship organizations claim, the money given doesn’t really help one child – instead, it is used for the charity’s overall programs. While the major sponsorship organizations all pool sponsor funds to assist a larger project or community in a way that also helps the individual sponsored child, there are varying levels of transparency about this. Some organizations openly promote this, while others barely mention it. This appears to be causing confusion for many donors.”

Edmonds defended child sponsorship programs, saying “Sponsorship is more than (a gimmick). The big thing that sponsorship does is, yes, it helps donors to connect in personal, meaningful ways, but it has a major impact on the children and the families of those children where the children have been sponsored by somebody from another country or another context.”
