= IDIN =

IDIN (International Development Innovation Network)
- Founded: 2007; 18 years ago
- Founder: Amy Smith
- Headquarters: Massachusetts Institute of Technology, Massachusetts Ave, Cambridge, USA
- Website: www.idin.org

The International Development Innovation Network (IDIN) is a network led by the Massachusetts Institute of Technology (MIT) D-Lab. It is funded by the United States Agency for International Development and the US Global Development Lab.

== History ==
IDIN was established in 2007 as a project of the MIT D-Lab. It includes over seven hundred innovators from 57 countries who participate in annual International Development Design Summits (IDDS). The first International Development Design Summit was organized by MIT D-Lab in 2007.

== Grants and fundings ==
IDIN offers microgrants and training grants to support innovators working on technological solutions.
