= Philanthropedia =

- Founded: 2008; 18 years ago
- Founder: Erik Bengtsson, Howard Bornstein, Chris Herndon, Deyan Vitanov
- Type: Non-profit Organization
- Location(s): San Mateo, CA & Washington, D.C.
- Origins: San Mateo, CA
- Region served: United States
- Key people: Erinn Andrews
- Website: http://myphilanthropedia.org

Philanthropedia, a division of GuideStar, was a crowdsourcing resource which provides information about high-impact nonprofit organizations. The site featured reviews from experts who are interviewed and surveyed. The site also featured rankings based on a combination of in-depth surveys and conversations with experts, including academics, funders, grant makers, policy makers and consultants.

== History ==
Philanthropedia was incubated at the Stanford Graduate School of Business starting in 2008 with the assistance of the Hewlett Foundation. Initially, the start-up was called Nonprofit Knowledge Network (or NKN). In 2008, NKN launched its first cause, recommending 8 top nonprofits working in the field of education at the national level.

In 2009, NKN officially incorporated as an organization, rebranded as Philanthropedia, under the leadership of Deyan Vitanov as CEO and Erinn Andrews as COO. Also in 2009, Philanthropedia released rounds of research on education, climate change, Bay Area homelessness and international microfinance.

In 2011, Philanthropedia was acquired by GuideStar and continues to run its core research now as a division of GuideStar.

Philanthropedia's methods of ranking nonprofits based on crowdsourced information was criticized by some experts in the field of WASH (water, sanitation and hygiene), including Marla Smith-Nilson, one of the founders of Water.org.

As of 2022, Philanthropedia is no longer hosted.
