= Philanthropy Journal =

- Website type: Online magazine
- Founded: 2010
- Website: philanthropyjournal.com

The Philanthropy Journal is an online magazine that delivers news, resources and opinion on matters relating to non-profit organizations. The journal offers a free website and email newsletters, nonprofit job postings, professional-development webinars, and resource listings. In addition to regular news coverage, it publishes information on trends, research, and resources relevant to nonprofits.

== History ==
The Philanthropy Journal was started in 2010. It was a program of the Institute for Nonprofits at North Carolina State University in Raleigh, North Carolina from 2012 to 2020. The program coordinator for the journal is Sandra Cyr. Until 30 June 2012 the journal was edited by Todd Cohen, a former news reporter and business editor for The News & Observer, who in 1991 began writing a weekly philanthropy column for that newspaper.

The magazine relaunched in 2022.
