= CALICE =

The CALICE (Calorimeter for Linear Collider Experiment) collaboration is an R&D group of more than 280 physicists and engineers from around the world, working together to develop new, high performance detectors for high energy positron-electron ($e^+e^-$) experiments at future International Linear Collider (ILC). It is a part of the European EUDET project.

The physics requirements of a future TeV-scale $e^+e^-$ machine, such as the ILC, demand extremely high performance calorimetry. This is best achieved using a finely segmented system that allows to reconstruct events using the so-called "particle flow approach" (PFA).

The calorimeter systems for high energy physics experiments usually consist of three main subsystems: electromagnetic calorimeter (ECAL) to detect electromagnetic showers produced by electrons (or positrons) and photons, hadronic calorimeter (HCAL) to measure hadron-induced showers, and muon tracker (or so-called tail catcher) to identify highly penetrating particles such as muons.

CALICE has developed prototypes of the three main calorimetric subsystems of a future detector: an ECAL followed by an HCAL and a tail catcher/muon tracker (TCMT), and is evaluating the performance of alternative technological solutions within this combined system.

The collaboration studies the performance of such calorimeters within a long, detailed program for an ECAL and several options of high granular analogue and digital calorimeters with sensitive layers of gas or plastic scintillator. The Tile subgroup has built a one cubic-meter steel/scintillator sandwich sampling hadronic calorimeter called physics prototype for study series in various test particle beams.

High granularity is achieved by 38 scintillator tile layers . Each layer is a 2-cm thick steel plate 90 × 90 cm^{2} followed by a 0.5-cm scintillator plate that consists of more than 200 scintillator tiles.

The mosaic of the HCAL layers exhibits a hundred 3 × 3 cm^{2} tiles in the center, surrounded by a large area covered with 6 × 6 cm^{2} tiles and finally enclosed by a strip of 12 × 12 cm^{2} tiles. These nearly 8000 tiles in total are read out individually by wavelength-shifting fibers which illuminate small silicon photomultipliers mounted on each tile and insensitive to large magnetic fields.

== Present status ==
The very important experimental part of this project is now in progress: a combined test beam program involving exposure of combined prototype calorimeter system to real particle beams from different accelerators and subsequent data analysis. In test beam studies, the Tile-HCAL with an effective thickness 4.5 nuclear interaction lengths ($\lambda$) is headed by an electromagnetic calorimeter (Silicon-Tungsten) near 1-$\lambda$ in thickness and followed by a 5-$\lambda$ thick tail catcher to measure the hadronic shower leakage.

The sampling calorimeter has been calibrated to get its signal vs. the incident particle energy dependence using test beams of different incident particle sorts with known energies in the range from 4 GeV to 120 GeV. The corrections for the calorimeter non-linearity and the external temperature influence have been taken into rooster. For test beams with energy 50 GeV the precision of incoming particle energy reconstruction was estimated to be near 4%.

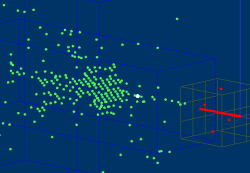
Detected pion track in ECAL (red) with its extension and shower in HCAL (green)

Given some number of unknown incoming particles, it is possible to reconstruct their energies using the picture of particle showers from the calorimeter. That picture has to be analyzed by a PFA program. In addition, novel deep analysis (DA) algorithms have been developed to separate different sorts of secondary particles inside showers in order to improve the energy reconstruction.

The unprecedented granularity of the CALICE calorimeter prototype provides an opportunity to test the particle flow concept. These days the work is in progress to check the output quality of the PFA programs. Due to large amount of test beam data, it becomes possible to use real events instead of simulated ones as input information for that programs. Since in the test beams all the particles are almost at the same coordinate position, artificial events are created consisting of several incoming particles separated by some distance in order to check if the PFA program can reconstruct the incoming particles correctly.
