= Yidiny =

Yidiny, Yidin, Yidinj, or Yidiñ, may refer to:

- Yidiny people, an Australian ethnic group
- Yidiny language, an Australian language
