= Candid (organization) =

US nonprofits info service, founded 2019

- Founded: 2019; 7 years ago
- Type: Nonprofit
- Tax ID no.: 13-1837418
- Purpose: Nonprofit information
- Location: New York, New York, U.S.
- Region served: United States
- Product: Nonprofit analysis solutions
- Key people: Ann Mei Chang; Samantha Barbee; Eva Feng; Aleda Gagarin; Kevin Mulder; Tracy Wakslers; Catherine Williams
- Employees: 200
- Website: candid.org
- Formerly called: Philanthropic Research, Inc., GuideStar, Foundation Center

Candid is an information service specializing in reporting on U.S. nonprofit companies. In 2016, its database provided information on 2.5 million organizations. It is the product of the February 2019 merger of GuideStar (founded 1997) with Foundation Center (founded 1956).

The organization maintains comprehensive databases on grantmakers and their grants; issues a wide variety of print, electronic, and online information resources; conducts and publishes research on trends in foundation growth, giving, and practice; and offers education and training programs.

== History ==
=== GuideStar ===
==== Formation–1997 ====
GuideStar was one of the first central sources of information on U.S. nonprofits and is the world's largest source of information about nonprofit organizations. GuideStar also serves to verify that a recipient organization is established and that donated funds go where the donor intended for individuals looking to give in the wake of disasters.

Guidestar was founded by Arthur "Buzz" Schmidt in Williamsburg, Virginia, in 1994, under the name Philanthropic Research, Inc. The company, which provided nonprofit information, officially received tax-exempt status as a 501(c)(3) public charity in 1996. In July of that year, Philanthropic Research, Inc., published the GuideStar Directory of American Charities, a CD and printed index that presented full reports on 35,000 charities and partial reports on 7,000 other charities. That fall, Philanthropic Research, Inc., officially launched its GuideStar website, allowing it to update the data more frequently and provide more extensive information. The organization began doing business under the name, "GuideStar", although its official name remained Philanthropic Research, Inc., until September 2008.

Beginning in 1997, GuideStar began posting information on all 501(c)(3) nonprofits in the IRS Business Master File. By December, the database held information on more than 600,000 nonprofits.

==== 1998–1999 ====
As of 1998, GuideStar provided digitized Form 990 data on its website's individual public charities pages. In January 1998, GuideStar received an award for Nonprofit Web Site Excellence from Philanthropy Journal, with an honorable mention for "Service to the Sector" for its searchable database of (at that time) more than 620,000 U.S. nonprofit organizations. In October 1999, GuideStar began posting 501(c)(3) public charities' annual information returns, known as IRS Forms 990 and 990-EZ.

==== 2000–2002 ====
GuideStar began publishing an annual Nonprofit Compensation Report in 2001. The first edition was derived from compensation data reported to the IRS by nearly 75,000 charities. In response to 9/11, GuideStar expanded the database to include non-charitable organizations eligible to accept tax-deductible contributions, along with special 9/11 funds and programs. GuideStar also collaborated with the New York State Attorney General's Office, providing data for the WTC Relief Info site. In November 2001, Time named Schmidt one of seven innovators in philanthropy for the new millennium. At the end of the year, the New Mexico Attorney General's Office launched an on-line Charities Research Service based on a customized version of the GuideStar database and search engine.

In February 2002, former PBS Chief Operating Officer Robert G. Ottenhoff took on Schmidt's role as president, and Schmidt became chairman of GuideStar's board. At the end of the year, GuideStar released the results of its first annual nonprofit economic survey.

==== 2003–2008 ====
In 2003, as part of the May launch of "Operation Phoney Philanthropy", the U.S. Federal Trade Commission encouraged donors to research charities' legitimacy on GuideStar before giving. That October, GuideStar received a U.S. Department of Commerce Technology Opportunities Program grant to create a system through which state charity regulators could share information.

The California Attorney General's Office modified its Charities Search to one based on a customized version of the GuideStar database and search engine in 2004.

In March 2005, the Interim Report of the Panel of the Nonprofit Sector delivered to the Senate Finance Committee cited GuideStar's contributions to nonprofit transparency. In June, GuideStar launched a new Web site that included all tax-exempt organizations registered with the IRS, expanding the database by more than 340,000 nonprofits. GuideStar modified its search engine to make it easier for users to find data.

In 2007, GuideStar added online donation capabilities to its site, which were processed by long-time partner Network for Good. To further connect nonprofits with current and potential supporters, GuideStar launched a beta version of the GuideStar Exchange. In 2008, GuideStar released a new report on characteristics that drive foundation spending patterns.

==== 2009–2013 ====
GuideStar partnered with GreatNonprofits in 2009 to add stakeholder reviews to organizations' profiles for individuals to communicate their experiences with nonprofits. GuideStar also launched CEO Compensation Checkpoint to analyze nonprofit CEO compensation.

In April 2011, GuideStar acquired Philanthropedia and Social Actions. In May, GuideStar, in partnership with BBB Wise Giving Alliance and Independent Sector, launched "Charting Impact" to provide a common platform for nonprofits to discuss their impact and results, and share that information publicly.

In 2013, GuideStar announced major changes to its GuideStar Exchange program, which allows nonprofits to supplement the public information that is available from the IRS.

GuideStar Nonprofit Profiles implemented three seals based on the information a nonprofit provides in its profile: Bronze, Silver, and Gold. The participation levels in the new GuideStar Exchange were based on the amount of information nonprofits share with the public via GuideStar. In September 2013, GuideStar and the Foundation Center announced a strategic partnership to deliver much-needed data and resources to the social sector.

In 2013, a charity watch investigator called Blue Avocado compared Charity Navigator, Charity Watch, Better Business Bureau, Combined Federal Campaign and Great Nonprofits. Blue Avocado praised GuideStar for offering "information rather than making judgments".

==== 2014–2020 ====
In February 2014, GuideStar hosted its first Impact Call, to expand the definition of nonprofit transparency and provide results in a timely and inclusive manner. In June, GuideStar released its new strategic plan, GuideStar 2020: Building the Scaffolding of Social Change. In October, in partnership with the D5 Coalition and Green 2.0, GuideStar released a tool for nonprofits to compile demographic data on their board members, employees and volunteers, including optional information input on gender, race and ethnicity, sexual orientation, and disability to share for public distribution.

In November 2014, GuideStar announced its goal to raise $10 million in transformational capital between 2014 and 2016 to help expand three essential functions: data innovation, collection, and distribution. The Bill and Melinda Gates Foundation committed to a $3 million grant structured as general operating support over three years to align with the strategic plan. Also in June, GuideStar partnered with Charity Navigator and BBB Wise Giving Alliance to launch the Overhead Myth Campaign.

In 2016, GuideStar upgraded GuideStar Nonprofit Profiles to allow users to more easily identify an organization's geographic reach, results, sources of funding, financial stability, and leadership. The redesign shifted emphasis from charity overhead costs to programs and results, a reflection of a broader debate in the nonprofit world about measuring and communicating impact. In November, GuideStar's position as a leading source of nonprofit information was reinforced when The Washington Post reported that the Trump Foundation had admitted to self-dealing after a 2015 IRS tax filing was uploaded to GuideStar's website by the Trump Foundation's law firm. In 2016, a new seal that allowed nonprofits to share progress and results for their mission, GuideStar Platinum, was introduced.

In June 2017, GuideStar entered into a partnership with the Southern Poverty Law Center to flag SPLC-identified "hate groups" on their web site. GuideStar then announced it was removing the labels for the time being.

=== 2017 Guidestar defamation lawsuit ===
After GuideStar placed a notice on the pages of some charities that were listed on the Southern Poverty Law Center (SPLC) "hate group list", one of the groups sued GuideStar for defamation. A Federal District Court Judge found in favor of GuideStar and dismissed the lawsuit on January 23, 2018. Liberty Counsel's appeal was denied on September 11, 2018. The request for an en banc rehearing was denied on November 20, 2018. The District Court's judgment took effect on November 27, 2018.

=== Foundation Center ===
Foundation Center was an American 501(c)(3)nonprofit organization headquartered in New York City. The center's stated mission was "to strengthen the social sector by advancing knowledge about philanthropy in the U.S. and around the world." The president of the organization was Bradford K. Smith.

In the mid-1950s, John Gardner, F. Emerson Andrews, and other foundation leaders created a "strategic gathering place for knowledge about foundations," positing that transparency would be the best defense against congressional inquiries about private foundation activities and spending. Board chair of Carnegie Corporation of New York at that time, Russell Leffingwell, told a McCarthy-era Congressional hearing that "We think that the foundation should have glass pockets." This statement helped to define the purpose of Foundation Center – known then as the Foundation Library Center – as it opened in New York City on November 26, 1956.

The organization's founding president was F. Emerson Andrews of the Russell Sage Foundation and author of Foundation Watcher. To achieve its goal of providing broad, open access to foundation information, the center began in 1959 to establish depositories of information in other libraries – now known as the Funding Information Network – nationwide. In 1960, it published the first Foundation Directory, which is still being published annually. In 1968, the organization's name was officially changed to The Foundation Center, signifying expansion of its services and activities beyond that of a library.

The organization collects detailed data on U.S. foundations through a variety of means, including grants lists supplied by foundations electronically and in other formats, foundations' publicly available IRS Forms 990-PF, annual reports, web sites, and mailed questionnaires. Today, the organization engages in an increasing amount of global data collection, too. The Center continues to be publisher and distributor of its own directories, research reports, and nonprofit management and fundraising guides, and makes its databases available via Foundation Directory Online, Foundation Maps, and other online resources.

==== The Funding Information Network ====
The Funding Information Network (FIN, for short) began just a few years after Foundation Center was founded in 1956, with the establishment of eight regional depositories. According to internal historical documentation, the very first depository was established in 1959 in Chicago, followed in 1962 by locations in Texas and Kansas. By 1978, the Network expanded to 75 “collections” with at least one collection in all fifty states. Between 1978 and 2013, these “Cooperating Collection” sites evolved from locations which housed collections of Foundation Center directories and databases to locations that engaged their social sector community, providing dynamic support and training on Foundation Center resources. In 2013, Cooperating Collections rebranded as the Funding Information Network, a name more reflective of the responsive network of support and services the program provides.

Network partners range from public libraries, to community foundations, to NGOs, and other types of community agencies. Over 20% of FIN partners have been with Foundation Center for 30 years or longer. By the same token, an equal percentage of partners are new or have been with the program for less than 5 years. Funding Information Network partners provide access to Foundation Center resources, including Foundation Directory Online and other databases, as well as training curricula from Foundation Center's suite of classes on fundraising, organizational sustainability, and leadership and management. Network partners pay an annual access fee for these resources, which they agree to provide to members of the public free of charge.

=== Merger ===
In 2012, Foundation Center and GuideStar first officially explored the idea of a merger. On February 5, 2019, Foundation Center merged with GuideStar to form Candid. Both organizations are committed to increasing transparency and providing access to data.

The merger brings together large repositories of data on both foundations and nonprofits, with a goal of providing insights and analysis as well. Former Executive Vice President of Candid and former president of GuideStar Jacob Harold said, "Our combined data and networks will allow us to understand the current state of the field in new ways.”

Candid will work to merge datasets to offer insights and more intuitive search results, deliver trainings to help people in the social sector develop skills, create new technology and data skills, help nonprofits improve fundraising skills, drive a common nonprofit profile, and more.

Part of the costs of the merger were supported financially by donors, including $27 million from the Bill and Melinda Gates, Charles Stewart Mott, and the William and Flora Hewlett Foundations. Much of the money was set to go towards merging business systems, as well as going into a reserve fund and venture fund.

The new organization is committed to providing access to data and increasing transparency in the social sector.

== Controversy ==
GuideStar has been criticized for its lack of transparency. GuideStar provided high ratings for charities whose legitimacy had been called into question.

GuideStar's merger with Foundation Center was also criticized as a conflict of interest due to Foundation Center's services towards non-profits.

Some in the sector saw possible downfalls, including data access becoming too expensive and Candid remaining neutral.

== Research ==
Candid analyzes and interprets the data it collects on foundations and their giving to inform the philanthropic sector and the broader public about patterns and trends in foundation growth, giving, and practice. Original research is conducted on international, national, regional, and special topic trends, as well as trends within specific types of grantmaking organizations – including corporate, family, and community foundations. Various media sources and news publications regularly cite their statistics, including The Chronicle of Philanthropy and The New York Times.
