= US Global Development Lab =

Innovation hub powered by USAID

- Founded: April 3, 2014
- Headquarters: United States of America

US Global Development Lab is serving as innovation hub powered by USAID. and other global challenges.

== History ==
US Global Development Lab launched on April 3, 2014 to increase the application of science, technology, innovation, and partnerships to end extreme poverty and promote inclusive economic growth. The aim of this new entity within USAID the end of extreme poverty by 2030.

== Global impact ==
US Global Development Lab focusing on Clean energy, clean Water, early Childhood to Primary education, health delivery, livelihoods, living Conditions, sanitation, secondary Education, women's Education and youth Job Skills. At UCLA, it provides a results-driven space for research, incubate, and implement innovative ideas to the alleviate poverty.

The U.S. Global Development Lab seeks to be a mechanism for taking ideas to change-making action. It partnered with UC Berkeley to create the Global Development Fellows Program to address sustainable development challenges in developing countries. It also funded Ebola Support Contract to eliminate this growing disease.
