= Institute for International Cooperation and Development =

Private nonprofit organization in United States

The former Institute for International Cooperation and Development (IICD), now One World Center, is a private nonprofit organization in the United States with headquarters located in Dowagiac, Michigan. Their stated purpose is to train volunteers for humanitarian projects In South and Central America and sub-Saharan Africa. They are affiliated with Tvind, a network of schools, aid agencies and commercial businesses based in Denmark, as part of Tvind's "DRH Movement".

The IICD has been the subject of several critical media reports in which former students recalled substandard living conditions, unreasonable work hours, bullying, and even a "cult-like" atmosphere. Volunteers have also reported receiving little to no training, being instead required to perform fundraising activities for the school and to labor in Tvind-owned businesses under the guise of raising money for their overseas projects. Others recalled the aid programs themselves being fraught with mismanagement and even disastrous results.
