= BBB Wise Giving Alliance =

American organization monitoring charities

The BBB Wise Giving Alliance (WGA) is an American charity monitoring organization. Under previous names, it has been reporting on nationally soliciting charities since the 1920s. BBB's Give.org evaluates charities, at no charge, using the 20 BBB Standards for Charity Accountability to help donors verify the trustworthiness of soliciting organizations and to strengthen charity practices. Resulting reports are freely accessible to the public at Give.org. These standards were developed with the help of the charitable community.

== Standards for Charity Accountability ==
In 2003, the WGA adopted a set of twenty "Standards for Charity Accountability". These standards replaced earlier versions by the PAS and the NCIB. The WGA developed these standards in conjunction with the Better Business Bureau, professional accounting organizations, charitable organizations, and foundations that fund grants.

The WGA explains that these standards were developed "to assist donors in making sound giving decisions and to foster public confidence in charitable organizations. The standards seek to encourage fair and honest solicitation practices, to promote ethical conduct by charitable organizations and to advance support of philanthropy."

The standards set a baseline for ethical governance, responsible fundraising, and transparency of financial operations.

Adherence to the Standards for Charity Accountability is voluntary; no charity is legally bound to submit documentation of its operations to the WGA. The absence of documentation, or the absence of a charity's inclusion in the BBB reporting system, may not necessarily indicate negative or unlawful behavior on the part of the charity.

== Evaluated charities ==
A listing of charitable organizations currently evaluated by the WGA is available on its website.

== Criticism ==
USA Today reported that the WGA's charity seal program had come under fire. The WGA licenses its seal to charities that meet its 20 standards of accountability at rates from $1,000 to $15,000 annually. This income provides 67 percent of the WGA's budget.

U.S. Senator Richard Blumenthal said that this financial relationship raises questions about "credibility and possible conflicts of interest." The American Institute of Philanthropy, another charity rater, criticized the WGA for taking money from the same charities it was rating. The WGA replied that there is "a strict separation between the people who do the accreditations and the ones who work on the seal programs."

== See also ==
- Charitable organization
- Charity assessment
- Charity watchdog
- Philanthropy
