= USAgain =

For-profit textile recycling company

USAgain is a for-profit textile recycling company operating in the United States. USAgain operates green and white collection bins in partnership with businesses, schools, and places of local government (bins are placed at these locations). The company was founded in Seattle in 1999 and has since expanded to over 10,000 collection sites in 15 states. USAgain is now headquartered in West Chicago, Illinois.

In 2015, USAgain collected 50 million pounds of textiles for reuse and recycling. Clothing collected by USAgain is sent to graders and wholesalers, which then determine whether the clothing will be resold as secondhand clothing or recycled into new products Like many other textile recycling organizations In addition to collecting clothing via bins, USAgain has a partnership to collect shoes at 2013 Warrior Dash races in the contiguous U.S. USAgain has also hosted events to support schools, notably the Prom Goes Green dress giveaway event for high school students in Chicago. The company has also supported schools through its Greenraiser program.

== Offices ==
USAgain operates eight division offices:

- Chicago (West Chicago, Illinois)
- Denver
- New York City (Mount Vernon, New York)
- Wilkes-Barre, Pennsylvania
- St. Louis
- San Francisco (Hayward, California)
- Seattle (Auburn, Washington)
- Los Angeles (Lake Forest, California)
