= Charity Navigator =

American charity assessment organization

- Formation: 2001; 25 years ago
- Founder: John Patrick Dugan
- Type: Nonprofit corporation
- Tax ID no.: 13-4148824
- Legal status: Active
- Purpose: Charity evaluation
- Headquarters: Saddle Brook, New Jersey, U.S.
- Official language: English
- CEO: Michael Thatcher
- Chief Program Officer: Laura Andes
- Chief Administrative Officer: Nancy Sadek
- Board of directors: Hope Lyons (chair), Michael Cooney (vice chair)
- Website: www.charitynavigator.org

Charity Navigator is a charity assessment organization. It is responsible for evaluating more than 200,000 charitable organizations based in the United States, operating as a 501(c)(3) organization. It intends to provide information about a nonprofit's financial stability and practices relating to accountability and transparency. It is the largest and most-utilized evaluator of charities in the United States. It does not accept any advertising or donations from the organizations it evaluates.

== History ==
Charity Navigator was launched in the spring of 2001 by John P. (Pat) Dugan, a pharmaceutical executive and philanthropist. The group's mission was to help "donors make informed giving decisions and enabling well-run charities to demonstrate their commitment to proper stewardship" of donor dollars.

Over the years, the group grew from 1,100 to over 230,000 charities.

In 2011, Kiplinger's Personal Finance selected Charity Navigator as a Money Management Innovation for "helping millions of people become philanthropists", and it was on Time magazine's top 50 websites of 2006 list.

In a 2014 Chronicle of Philanthropy interview on the nonprofit sector, journalist Nicholas Kristof identified it with a trend he deplored: "There is too much emphasis on inputs and not enough on impact", Kristof said. "This has been worsened by an effort to create more accountability through sites like Charity Navigator. There is so much emphasis now on expense ratios that there is an underinvestment in administration and efficiency."

A 2014 survey of attitudes toward charity evaluation indicated positive results for Charity Navigator in six of seven categories.

Charity Navigator developed and added the Giving Basket to their website in 2015, making it easier for donors to give a one-time or monthly donation up to $100,000.

In October 2020, Charity Navigator acquired impact-based charity evaluator ImpactMatters.

In 2021, the Giving Basket was powered by Give Lively, which does not charge a fee for the transfer of funds to organizations.

In August 2023, Charity Navigator acquired Causeway, a philanthropy technology startup.

== Evaluation method ==
Using publicly available tax returns (IRS Form 990) filed with the Internal Revenue Service and information posted by charities on their web sites, the Charity Navigator rating system bases its evaluations in two broad areas—financial health and accountability/transparency. Based on these criteria charities are awarded one to four stars.

=== Limitations of initial methodology ===
In the early years, the group's methodology was the subject of some criticism for its approach at the time. This method was criticized in a 2005 article in the Stanford Social Innovation Review for (at the time) taking into account only a single year's IRS Form 990. This approach can lead to significant fluctuation in the ranking of a charity from year to year. Also, the focus on the IRS Form 990 has itself been criticized, as the accuracy and reliability of IRS Form 990 data may be questionable, according to the chief executive of GuideStar. Form 990 categorizes a charity's expenditures into three broad categories that are open to accounting manipulation. The nonprofit sector does not have the strict financial regulation and transparency required from public corporations (under the Securities Act of 1933, the Securities Exchange Act of 1934, and the Sarbanes-Oxley Act, among others), creating limitations on how accurately a charity's efficiency can be graded based on a tax return. Particularly relevant to Charity Navigator's methodology in 1999 was that 59% of the 58,000 charities receiving public donations in 1999 failed to report any fundraising expenditures, illustrating a potential problem with relying on Form 990 figures alone when analyzing an organization.

Charity Navigator rates the 6% of charity organizations in the United States that have over $1 million in annual revenue (these 6% get 94% of the revenues that come into the nonprofit sector each year).

=== Revisions ===
In December 2008, President and CEO Ken Berger announced on his blog that the organization intended to expand its rating system to include measures of the outcomes of the work of charities it evaluated. This was described in further detail in a podcast for The Chronicle of Philanthropy in September 2009. The article explained that plans for a revised rating system would also include measures of accountability (including transparency, governance, and management practices) as well as outcomes (the results of the work of the charity).

In July 2010, Charity Navigator announced its first major revamp. This revamping began what the organization stated is the process to move toward CN 3.0, which is a three-dimensional rating system that would include what they consider the critical elements to consider in making a wise charitable investment

1. financial health (Charity Navigator evaluated this from its inception),
2. accountability and transparency (begun in July 2010) and
3. results reporting (slated to begin rating this dimension in July 2012).

After collecting data for more than a year, in September 2011 Charity Navigator launched CN 2.0, which is a two-dimensional rating system that rates a charity's: (1) financial health, and (2) accountability and transparency.

=== Expansions ===
In January 2013, Charity Navigator announced another expansion to its rating methodology, "Results Reporting: The Third Dimension of Intelligent Giving". Because mission-related results are the very reason that charities exist, Charity Navigator developed this new rating dimension to specifically examine how well charities report on their results. The new rankings now include "various criteria, including ... privacy policies".

In July 2020, Charity Navigator announced an additional nonprofit rating system, Encompass. The new Encompass Rating System analyzes nonprofit performance based on four key indicators:

1. Finance & Accountability
2. Impact & Results
3. Leadership & Adaptability
4. Culture & Community

This alternative methodology allows the organization to increase the total number of rated nonprofits from 9,000 to 160,000 at launch. The rating system launched with the first key indicator, Finance & Accountability, with a plan to release additional indicators over the next 18–24 months.

Since then, Charity Navigator has continued to expand its methodology to include additional impact ratings, and assessments on Equity policies and practices, feedback and measurement best practices. As of June 2024, there are over 230,000 rated organizations and over 3000 organizations rated on Impact & Measurement.

=== Improvements in response; reception ===
Some charities, in response, began to supply more information. The New York Times reported in 2010 that one non-profit began "reporting on its finances using the same format as the 10-K."

In response to an op-ed authored by Charity Navigator's CEO entitled "The Elitist Philanthropy of so-called Effective Altruism", the cofounder of the Centre for Effective Altruism wrote "What Charity Navigator Gets Wrong About Effective Altruism".

== See also ==
- American Institute of Philanthropy
- Charity fraud
- Charity Intelligence Canada
- CharityWatch
- GiveWell
- GuideStar
- Super Buddies Hudson-Ohio - Arabella Giaco - president
