= CharityWatch =

American nonprofit organization

- Formation: 1992; 34 years ago
- Founder: Daniel Borochoff
- Type: Nonprofit corporation
- Tax ID no.: 33-0491030
- Legal status: Active
- Purpose: Charity ratings
- Headquarters: Chicago, Illinois, U.S.
- Official language: English
- President: Laurie Styron
- Main organ: charitywatch.org
- Revenue: $605,768
- Staff: 5
- Website: charitywatch.org
- Formerly called: American Institute of Philanthropy (1992–2012)

CharityWatch, known until 2012 as the American Institute of Philanthropy, is an American 501(c)(3) nonprofit organization in Chicago, Illinois, created in the United States by Daniel Borochoff in 1992, to provide information about charities' financial efficiency, accountability, governance, and fundraising.

== Activities ==
CharityWatch is a nonprofit charity watchdog and rating organization that works to uncover and report on wrongdoing in the nonprofit sector by conducting in-depth analyses of the audited financial statements, tax forms, fundraising contracts, and other reporting of nonprofit. They only review 600 charities out of 1.5 million in the US.

CharityWatch encourages donors to give to charities that will allocate most of their contributions to program services that benefit the people and causes that donors wish to support. CharityWatch also promotes charity accountability and transparency through its research on the rapidly changing nonprofit field and through its work with investigative journalists uncovering wrongdoing within the nonprofit sector.

CharityWatch rates nonprofits on an A+ (best) to F (worst) scale and provides data on charity executive salaries, governance, public transparency, donor privacy, asset reserves, and other information uncovered by its analysts during their evaluation. It publishes this information on its website and in its biannual Charity Rating Guide & Watchdog Report. CharityWatch also publishes lists of Top-Rated Charities, charities with high assets, and a report of top compensation packages paid to charity executives.

CharityWatch states that it is independently funded by small donations from the general public and that it receives over 95% of its support this way. The majority of CharityWatch's content is free to the public, including its library of articles, giving tips, resources for donors and journalists, top charity compensation packages, and its full reports on all of its top-rated charities. Membership to access CharityWatch's full content is currently $50 per year.

CharityWatch sets itself apart as a charity watchdog organization that performs individualized analyses of charities' financial reporting. It has been critical of other sources of charity information that produce automated ratings based solely or primarily on computer algorithms whose rating systems can easily be gamed by charities. CharityWatch assigns low ratings to charities that have high fundraising costs and low program spending in cases where other charity raters have assigned the same charities perfect scores. CharityWatch has also assigned high ratings to nonprofits with more complex accounting cases where the simplistic systems of other raters produced unfairly low scored for the same charity.

CharityWatch also investigates ethical issues surrounding charity spending, including salaries and payouts, financial reporting, telemarketing and direct-mail solicitation campaigns, and governance. It shares the results of its research with the media and government agencies and works closely with these parties to educate the public about informed giving. CharityWatch founder Daniel Borochoff has testified before Congress about veterans charities, the aftermath of Hurricanes Katrina and Rita, and the philanthropic response to the September 11 attacks.

CharityWatch's ratings have received exposure from Congress and the media; including an appearance on the front page of The Washington Post.

== Governance and operations ==
CharityWatch founder, Daniel Borochoff, retired from his role as president in 2020, but remains on the charity's board of directors. Laurie Styron, a former CharityWatch analyst, was appointed executive director in his place in February 2020. In 2019, CharityWatch spent $615,950, of which 83% ($510,140) was spent on programs.

== Reception ==
In 2005, prior to making all of its ratings available on its website, the then-named American Institute of Philanthropy (AIP) was criticized in a study on rating nonprofits published in the Stanford Social Innovation Review for having a "gotcha" mentality and limited explanation for their ratings. The study criticized several nonprofit watchdog organizations for relying heavily on financial data that is not adequate for evaluating a nonprofit organization and may misguide the public, although the study noted that AIP "recognizes the limitations of the [IRS Form] 990 and thus develops its financial health ratios by analyzing a charity's audited financial statements".

CharityWatch does not take charities' financial reporting at face value even when Generally Accepted Accounting Principles (GAAP) allow charities to include in-kind goods of questionable value in their financial reporting, or allow charities to include telemarketing or direct mail costs in their reported program spending. Many in the nonprofit space have taken issue with this approach.

== See also ==
- Charity assessment
- Charity Navigator
- GiveWell
- GuideStar
