= List of companies based in Idaho =

This is a list of companies based in Idaho. Idaho is a state in the northwestern region of the United States. It is the 14th largest, the 39th most populous, and the 7th least densely populated of the 50 United States. The United States Census Bureau estimates that the population of Idaho was 1,654,930 as of July 1, 2015, up from 1,595,728 on July 1, 2012, a 1.8% increase since 2010. The state's largest city and capital is Boise. Today, the largest industry in Idaho is the science and technology sector. It accounts for over 25% of the state's total revenue and over 70% of the state's exports. Idaho's industrial economy is growing, with high-tech products leading the way. Idaho is an important agricultural state, producing nearly one-third of the potatoes grown in the United States.

== Companies based in Idaho ==
=== A ===
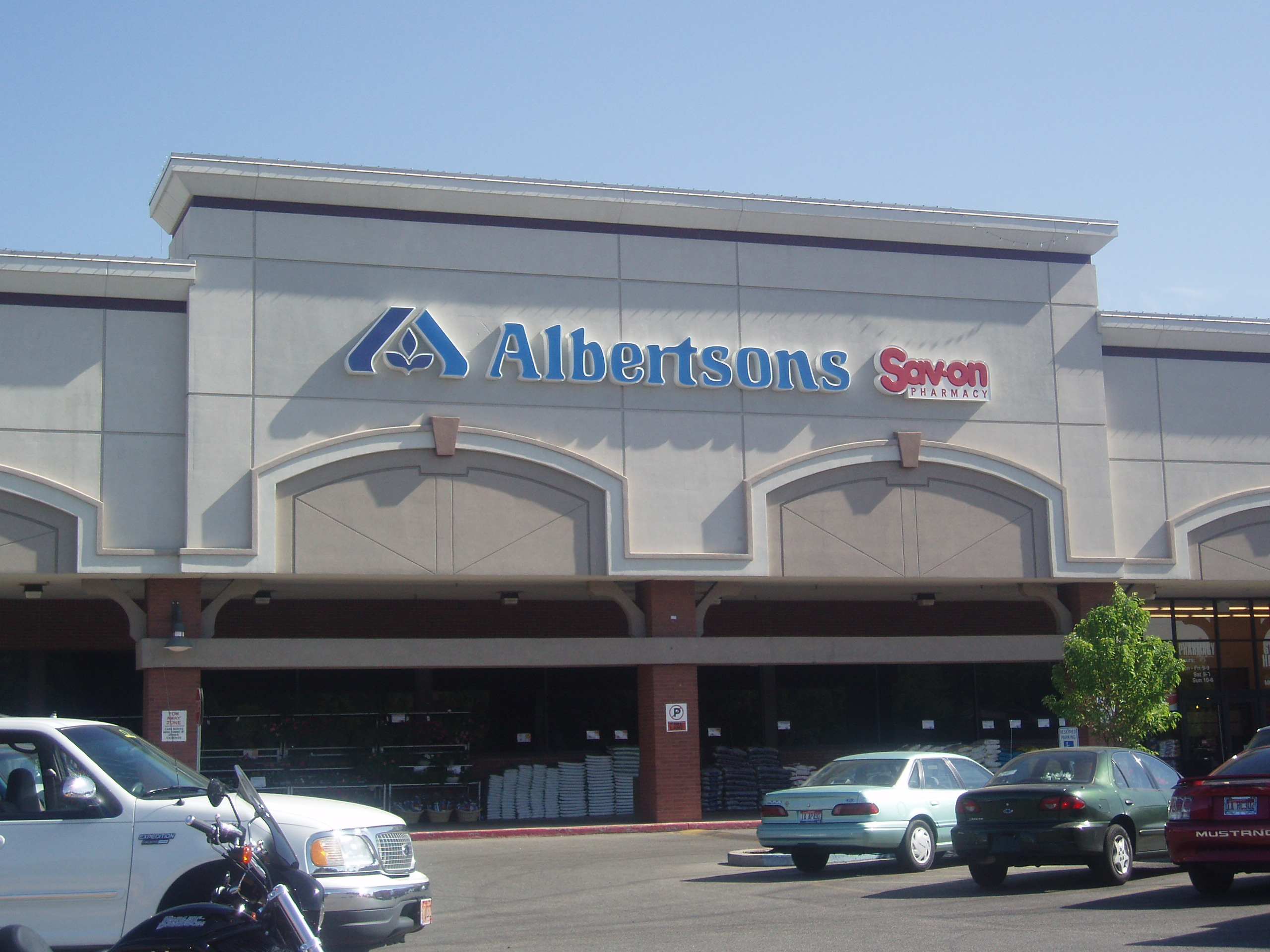
An Albertsons grocery store in Boise, Idaho

- Albertsons
- Amalgamated Sugar Company

=== B ===
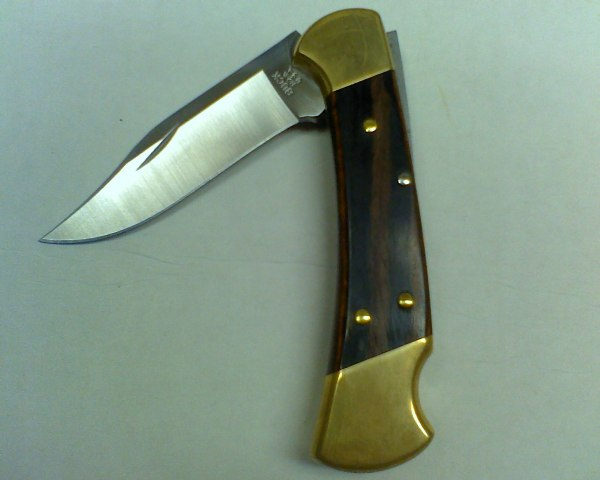
A Buck Ranger 112, made by Buck Knives

- Boise Cascade
- Buck Knives

=== C ===
- CCI
- Chelton Flight Systems
- Chesbro Music Company
- Chris Reeve Knives
- CityPASS
- Clearwater Analytics
- ClickBank
- The Concierge Questionnaire
- CSHQA

=== D ===
- D. L. Evans Bank
- Dave Smith Motors

=== E ===
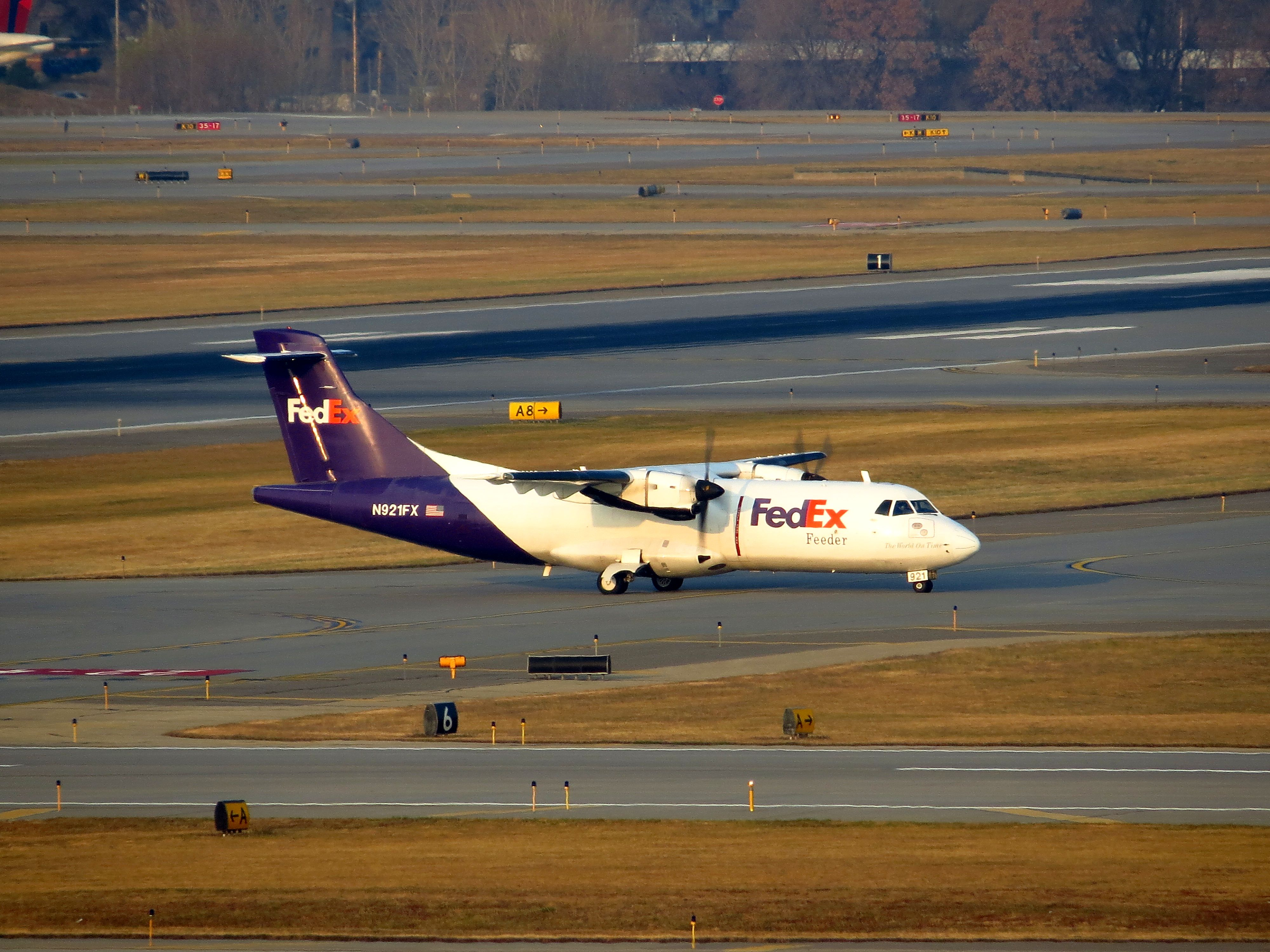
An Empire Airlines ATR 42 in FedEx Feeder livery

- Earth Point
- Empire Airlines

=== F ===
- FIDO Friendly

=== G ===
- Grand Teton Vodka

=== H ===
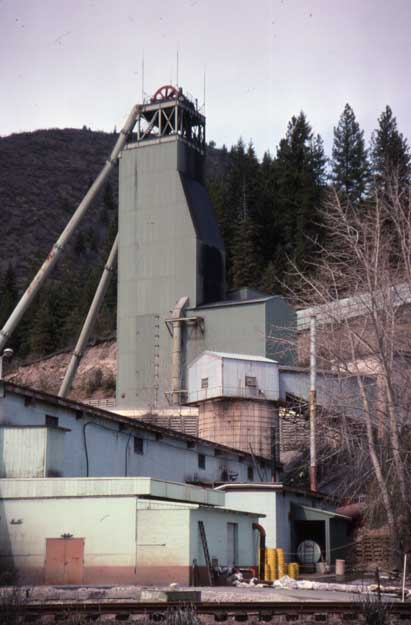
The headframe of Hecla Mining's Lucky Friday silver mine, 1995

- Hecla Mining

=== I ===
- Idacorp
- Idaho Candy Company
- Idaho Central Credit Union
- Idaho Power
- Idaho Statesman

=== J ===
- Jacksons Food Stores

=== K ===
- Klim

=== L ===
- Lamb Weston Holdings

=== M ===
- Melaleuca
- Micron Technology

=== N ===
- Native American Services Corp.

=== O ===
- The Owyhee Avalanche

=== P ===
People working at a Press-A-Print training program

- Pacific Press Publishing Association
- Pita Pit (American headquarters)
- Preco

=== Q ===
- Quest Aircraft

=== R ===
- Reel Theatres
- Ridley's Family Markets
- Roady's Truck Stops
- Rocky Mountain Construction

=== S ===
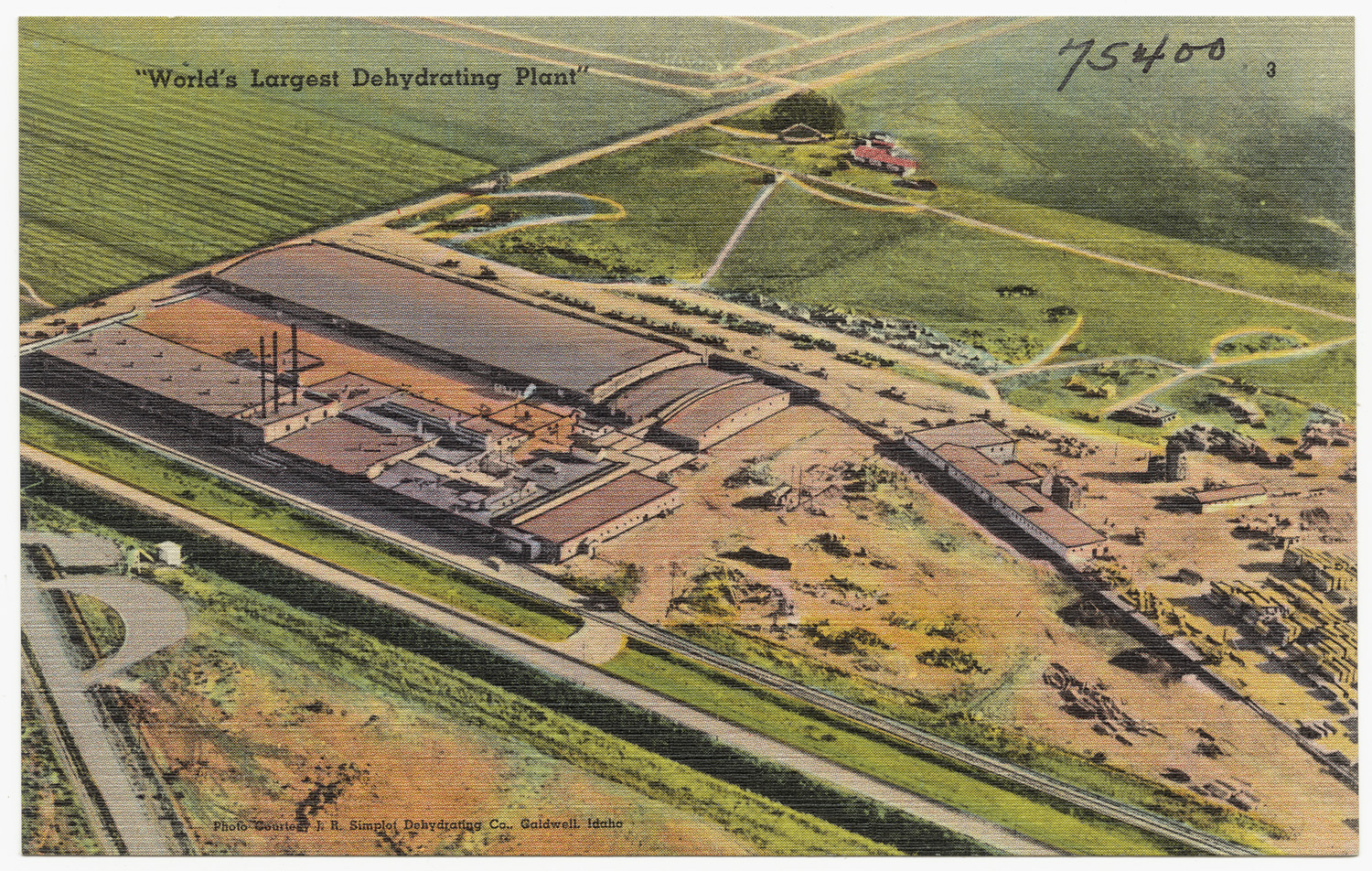
A view of the Simplot plant in Caldwell, Idaho, circa 1930–1945. The caption in the image states "World's Largest Dehydrating Plant."

- Salmon Air
- Scottevest
- Simplot
- Sunshine Minting

=== T ===
- TriGeo Network Security
- TSheets

=== W ===
- WinCo Foods

=== Y ===
- Yellowstone Bear World

== Companies formerly based in Idaho ==
=== A ===
- All That Is Heavy

=== B ===
- Building Materials Holding Corporation

=== C ===
- Coeur Mining
- Coldwater Creek

=== K ===
- King's Variety Store

=== M ===
- Morrison-Knudsen
- Mountain West Airlines-Idaho

=== P ===
- Press-A-Print
- ProClarity

=== S ===
- Super Saver Foods

=== V ===
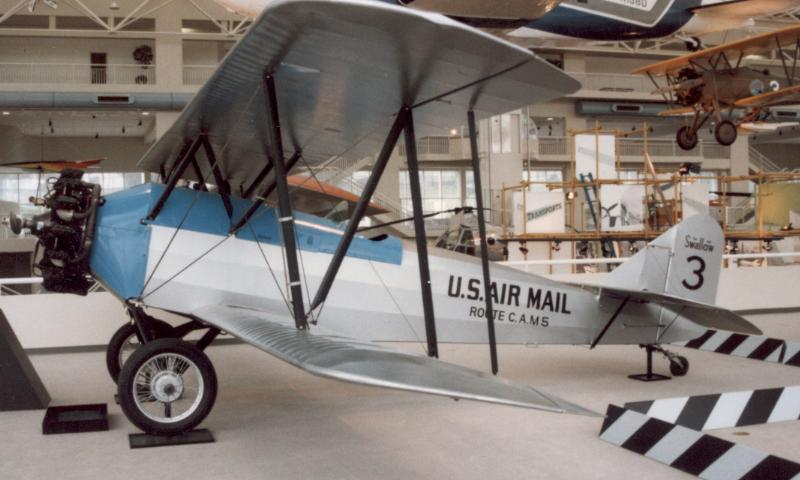
A Swallow J-5 built in 1924, as operated by Varney Air Lines. Displayed at the Museum of Flight, Boeing Field, Seattle, May 1989.

- Varney Air Lines

=== W ===
- Washington Group International

== See also ==
- Category:Organizations based in Idaho
- List of breweries in Idaho
