= Philippe Klein =

French born engineer and businessman (born 1957)

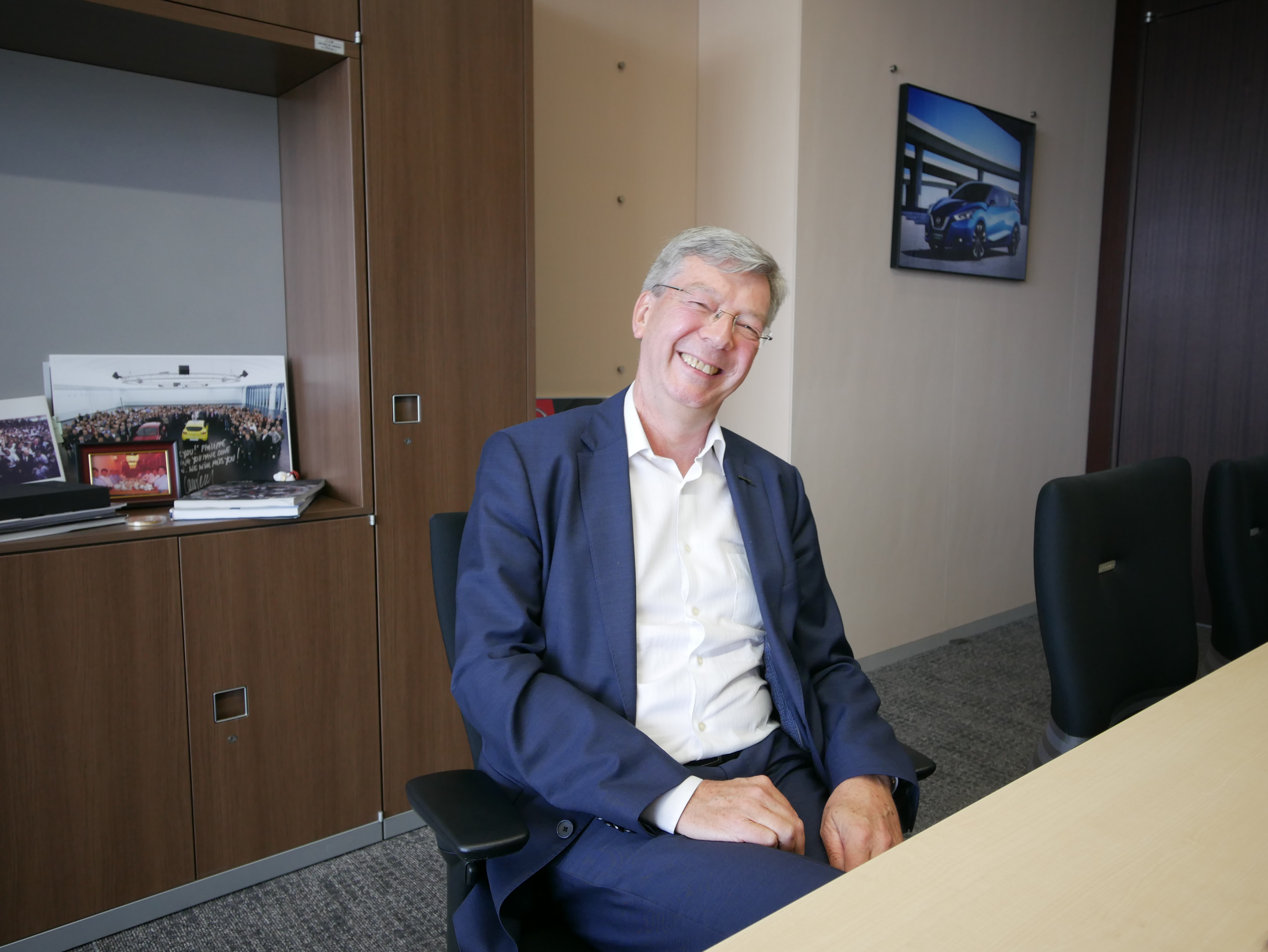
- Klein in 2017
- Born: 1957 (age 68–69)
- Occupations: Auto-industry executive, CPLO Nissan

Philippe Klein (French pronunciation: [filip(ə) klɛ̃]) is a French-born engineer and businessman. He was the Chief Planning Officer of Japanese automobile manufacturer Nissan from 2014 to 2019.

== Education ==
Born in 1957, Klein was educated at the École Supérieure de Physique et de Chimie Industrielles de la ville de Paris (The City of Paris Industrial Physics and Chemistry Higher Educational Institution) where he obtained his diploma in 1980. He gained a higher level diploma from the École Nationale Supérieure du Pétrole et des Moteurs (National Higher Educational Institution of Oil and Engines).

== Career ==
In 1981, Klein started his career at Renault as an engineer in the Engine Development Department. In 1992, he was appointed executive assistant to the chairman. In 1999, Renault entered into a partnership with the Japanese auto-maker Nissan. The two corporations took minority shareholdings in one another and embarked on a sustained programme of technical and commercial collaboration which included the exchange of senior executives. At this point, Klein relocated to Tokyo, joining Nissan as a vice-president. He subsequently progressed to the position of Senior Vice-President, remaining with Nissan until 2003.

In 2003, he was appointed "Vice President, Industrial System Performance Department" with Renault. In September 2008, Philippe Klein was appointed "Deputy Director General Product Planning, Programs" of the Renault Group. Until 2014 he was "Executive Vice President, Product Planning, Programs" and, from 2005 to 2014, a member of the company's Executive Management Committee.

In September 2014, his appointment was announced as chief planning officer and member of the executive committee at Nissan, in succession to Andy Palmer.

In November 2019, Nissan announced Klein had left his position at the company as part of broader management team changes following on from the departure of CEO Hiroto Saikawa, who resigned in September 2019 after an internal audit found he and other executives were overpaid as part of a stock-related payment plan.
