= NESCO =

NESCO or Nesco may refer to:

== Organizations ==
- National Electric Signaling Company, United States
- National Enameling and Stamping Company, United States
- North Eastern Electric Supply Company (NESCo), England
- Northern Electricity Supply Company Limited, Bangladesh
- Nuclear Employee Sports and Cultural Organisation of Kalpakkam, a township in India
- The National Energy Services Company, Saudi Arabia

== Places ==
- Nesco, New Jersey
- Northeast Story County, Colo, Iowa, see Colo–NESCO Community School District

== Other ==
- A brand name of Metal Ware Corporation
- Navy Expeditionary Supply Corps Officer

== See also ==
- NASCO (disambiguation)
- UNESCO
