= NASCO =

NASCO or Nasco may refer to:

- Nasco (grape), an Italian grape variety
- Claudio Nasco (1976–2013), Cuban journalist and newscaster
- Jan Nasco (c. 1510–1561), Franco-Flemish composer and writer on music
- Joe Nasco (born 1984), American soccer player
- National Association of State Charity Officials, an American association of regulators
- Native American Services Corp., a construction company in Kellogg, Idaho
- North American Students of Cooperation, a federation of housing cooperatives in Canada and the United States
- North American SuperCorridor Coalition, a non-profit transportation organization
- North Atlantic Salmon Conservation Organization, an international fishing regulator

== See also ==
- NESCO (disambiguation)
- National Steel and Shipbuilding Company (NASSCO), a shipyard in San Diego, California
