= Kineton High School =

Location
- Banbury Road; Kineton, Warwickshire, CV35 0JX; England; 52°09′24″N 1°30′08″W

Information
- Type: Academy
- Motto: Achieving personal best
- Established: 1957
- Local authority: Warwickshire
- Department for Education URN: 147432 Tables
- Ofsted: Reports
- Headteacher: Helen Bridge
- Gender: Coeducational
- Age: 11 to 18
- Enrolment: 1038
- Houses: Avon, Castle, Fosse and Verney
- Colours: Black, Red and Silver
- Website: http://www.kinetonhighschool.org.uk/

Kineton High School is a mixed secondary school located in South Warwickshire, England within the village of Kineton. It is a non-selective academy school with a sixth form.

== History ==
A need for a new school was expressed by people of South Warwickshire. In the 1950s, County Education Officer Mr N. A. Y. Yorke-Lodge proposed his high schools scheme with aims to raise standards and cater to all abilities outside of the eleven-plus. Within years, this became schools including in Bidford-on-Avon, Henley-in-Arden, Kenilworth and Shipston-on-Stour as well as Kineton. This led to children from Kineton and the surrounding area transferring to the newly built school in 1958.

The building was expanded over the first years and decades to accommodate rising enrolment. A youth club opened in its own building onsite in early 1964. In 1972, the swimming pool opened, dug with help from the local community and money raised by a pool committee including through students doing three sponsored walks. Later the same year, an annexe of Kineton, for administrative purposes, was set up at RAF Gaydon resettlement camp to educate Ugandan Asian refugee children. In 1978, another sponsored walk raised funds to install solar heating panels for the pool. Around 1980, additional laboratories were constructed.

In October 1998, caretaker Ken Thompson found a spider web covering the 4.54-hectare playing field, recognised as world record for the largest spider web outdoors. In the early to mid-2000s the school gained extensions in two classrooms next to the kitchen, an ICT suite by the library and a fitness suite next to the Sports Hall changing rooms. Specialist Sports College status was obtained in 2003. The school celebrated its 50th anniversary in 2008. There was a fire in the sports centre in 2009. An artificial turf pitch for use in P.E. was built on the field in the early 2010s. A new science block was completed in 2017, replacing seven dilapidated mobile classrooms, a significant development. A similar block was planned for across from it in a second phase.

The school became an academy in September 2019, joining Stowe Valley Multi Academy Trust, having been a community school run by Warwickshire County Council previously. BBC Midlands Today interviewed students for a report on schools staying open during the COVID-19 pandemic in November 2020.

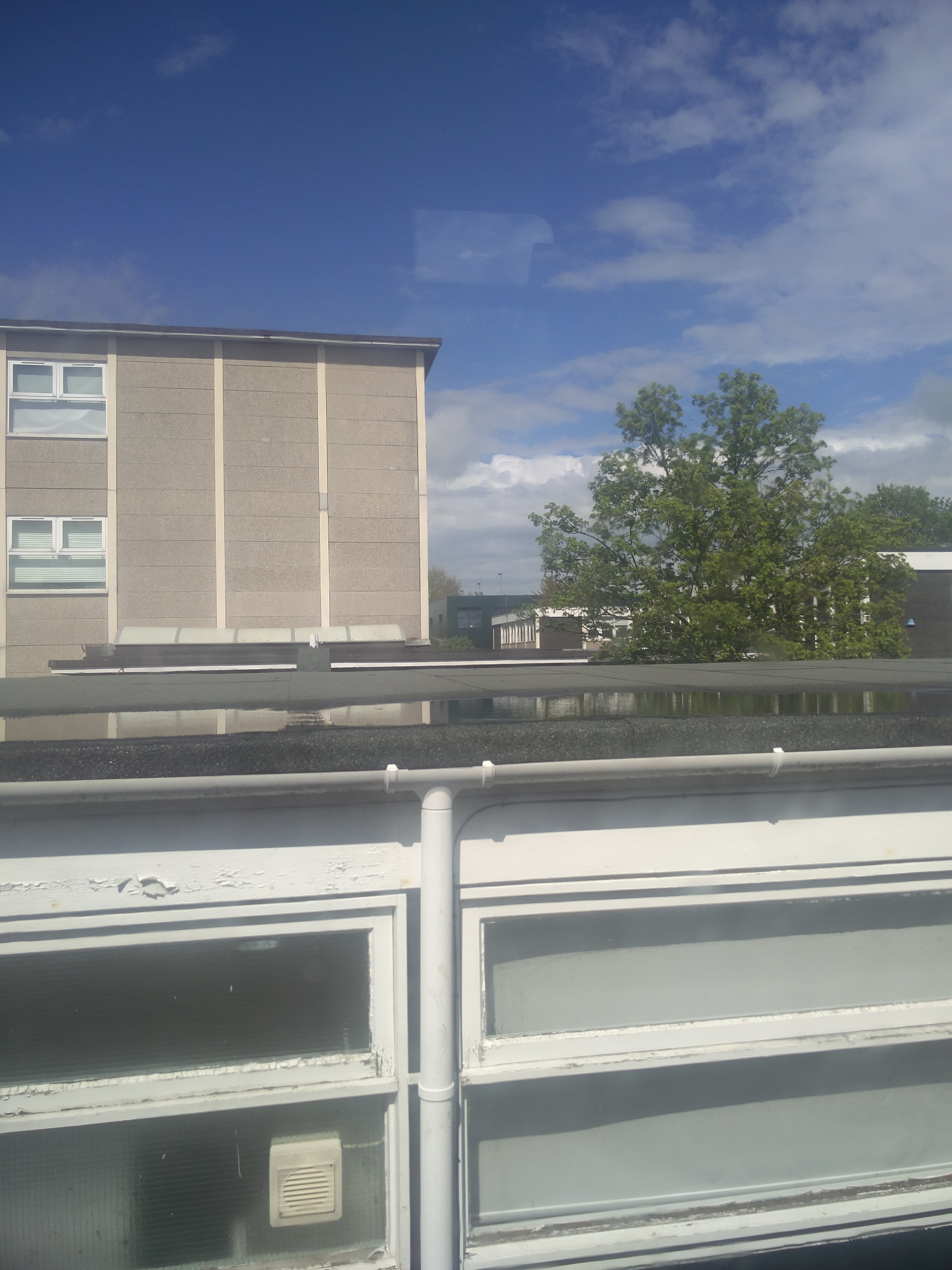
Part of the school in 2018

The school was rebuilt after being named one of the first 50 schools chosen as part of the government's School Rebuilding Programme. All the school buildings were demolished with the exception of the recent science block, replaced by a new three-storey block and separate sports hall, moving in in September 2024. That academic year, the four Houses Adlington, Ainslie, Hoy and Redgrave, named after Team GB Olympians, were replaced by Avon, Castle, Fosse and Verney, local landmarks.

=== Headteachers ===
There have been six permanent headteachers since the school opened:

Headteacher	Duration
Melvyn H Turner	−1978
John M Baker	1978–1990?
Paul Logan	1990–2002
Julia Morris	2002–2014
Siona Robson	2014–2018
Helen Bridge	2018–present

== Academic performance ==
In 2013 the school was in the Specialist Schools and Academies Trust list of top 20 percent of schools for high attainment in end of Key Stage 4 and the Financial Times’ top 1,000 schools list for post 16 performance.

== International links ==
The school is partnered with Sanghamitta Balika Vidyalaya, a girls' school in Sri Lanka.

== Notable former pupils ==
- William Beck (actor)
- Andy Palmer (former CEO of Aston Martin)
- Sarah Ann Kennedy (actor, animation director, & educator)
