= UK Automotive Products Limited =

UK Automotive Products Limited (UKAP) Logo

UK Automotive Products Ltd (UKAP) is a supplier of heavy-duty vehicle automotive lighting equipment based in Cannock, Staffordshire. Their product range includes bulb and light-emitting diode lighting - LED lamps, headlamps, lightbars, beacons, direction indicators, HID lighting, interior lamps, number plate lamps, rear and combination lamps, stalk lamps, plus working and driving lamps. As well as this they provide reversing aids, object detection Systems, reflectors (retroreflectors), air horns and modular harnesses.

Originally part of a transport service group, UKAP was purchased by its present owners in March 1999. Over the last few years UKAP has grown to become an independent distributor of heavy-duty lighting and electrical products.

UKAP products are manufactured by companies all over the world. These include Truck-Lite , Preco Electronics, JW Speaker Corporation , Hella, Perei Lighting , Delta Design, Grover Products co., and LAP Electronic Ltd.

== See also ==
- Brands by Product Type
- Electronics
