= Idaho Candy Company =

American confectionery manufacturer

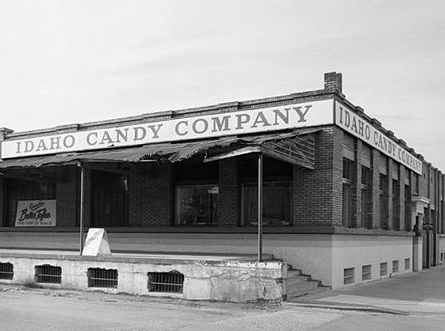
Idaho Candy Company Warehouse

The Idaho Candy Company is a candy manufacturer in Boise, Idaho, United States. They are best known for the Idaho Spud bar, which has a cult following in the Northwestern United States. The company has been making the popular bar of marshmallow filling covered in chocolate and coconut since 1918. Though many historic candy makers have since gone out of business, in past decades, the Idaho Candy Company competed with other local producers like the Idaho Russet made by the Dainty Maid company and another "Spud Bar" from Utah made by Ostler Candy.

== History ==
The Idaho Candy Company was founded in 1901 by Thomas Ovard "T.O." Smith (1876-1954). He began by making chocolates in his garage, and then selling them door-to-door. In 1909, he opened a factory in Boise, which still operates today. John Wagers bought the company in 1984, and his son Dave Wagers ran the company from 1991 to 2025. Since July 2025, the Sturdivant family, Paul and Megan, own Idaho Candy Company. In 2007, the company was selected "Best Candy Company" by Boise Weekly.

== Products ==
Over the years, the company produced more than 50 varieties of candy bars, but that number was reduced to four by late 2013. The Idaho Spud (1918) consists of a cocoa-flavored marshmallow center covered with a dark chocolate coating and sprinkled with coconut flakes. It is shaped like a potato. The Old Faithful (1925) consists of a vanilla-flavored marshmallow center topped with whole peanuts and covered with milk chocolate. The Cherry Cocktail (1926) consists of a maraschino cherry cream center coated in ground peanuts and milk chocolate. Three varieties of Owyhee Butter Toffee are also still being produced, along with about 20 varieties of bulk candy. All candy made by the company can be bought directly at the Idaho Candy Company website.

Products from the company are labeled as "Owyhee" after the Owyhee River and Owyhee County, Idaho, that are located near the production plant.

== Gallery ==
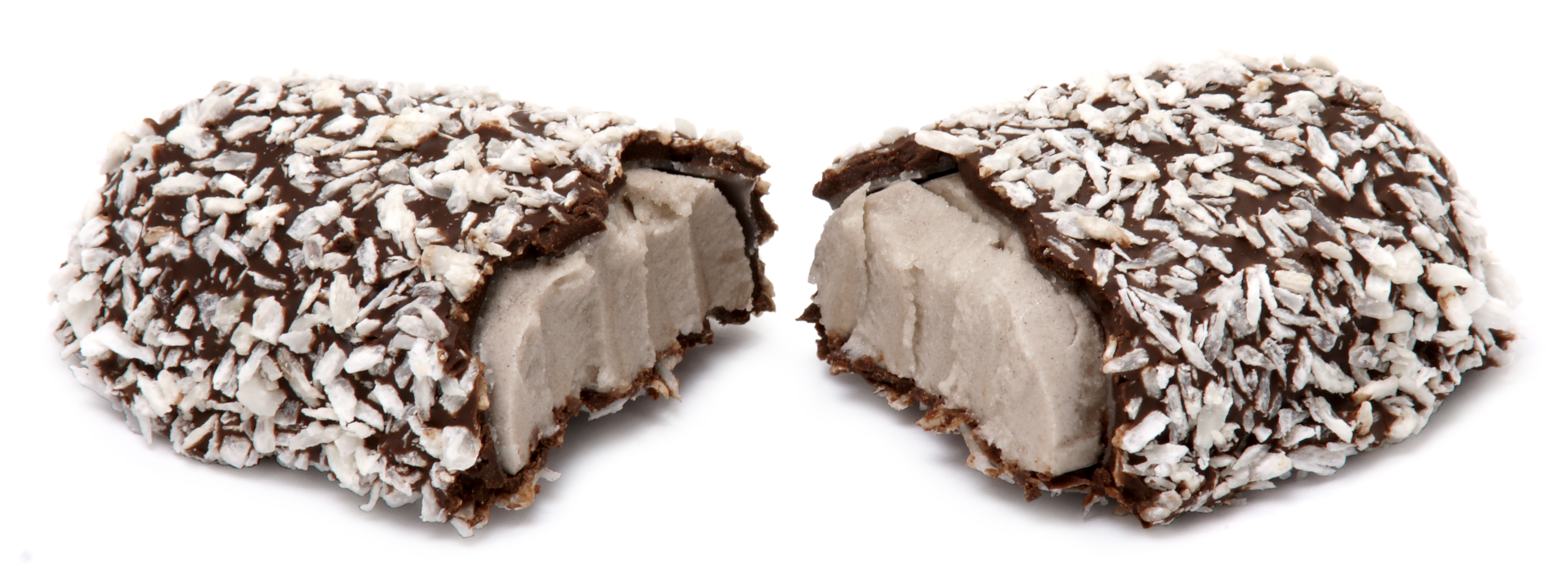
Idaho Spud split

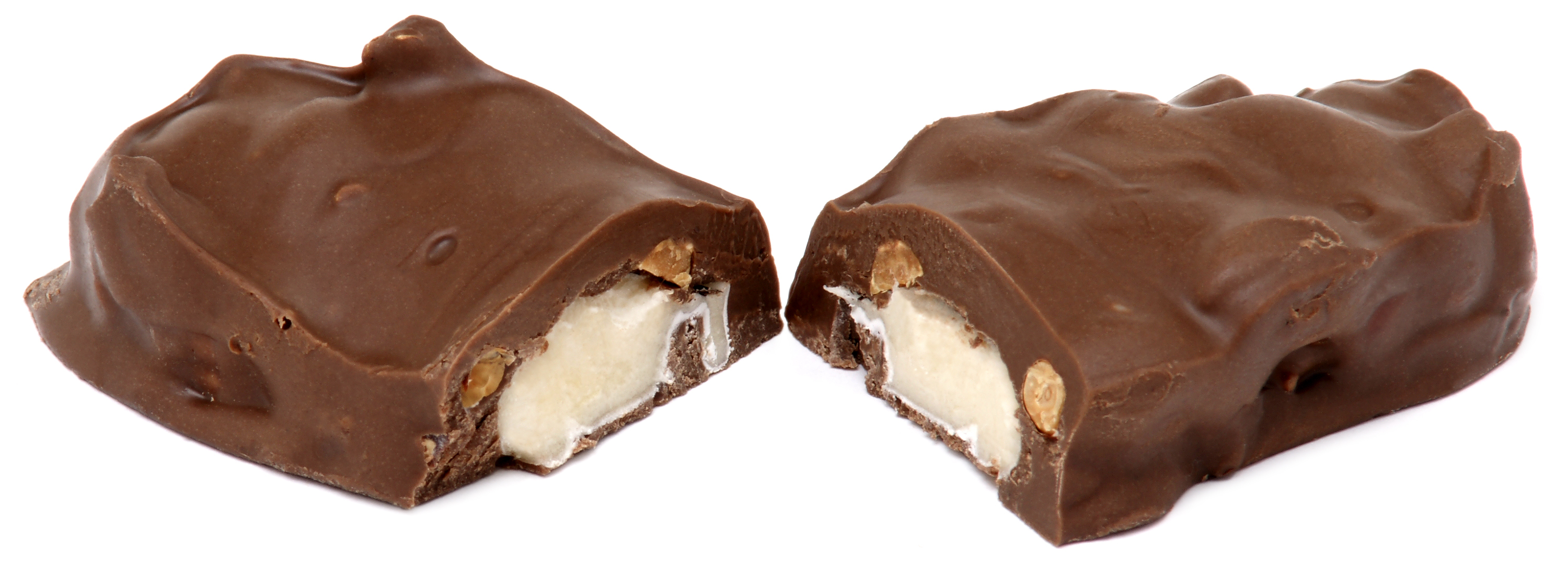
Peanut Cluster split

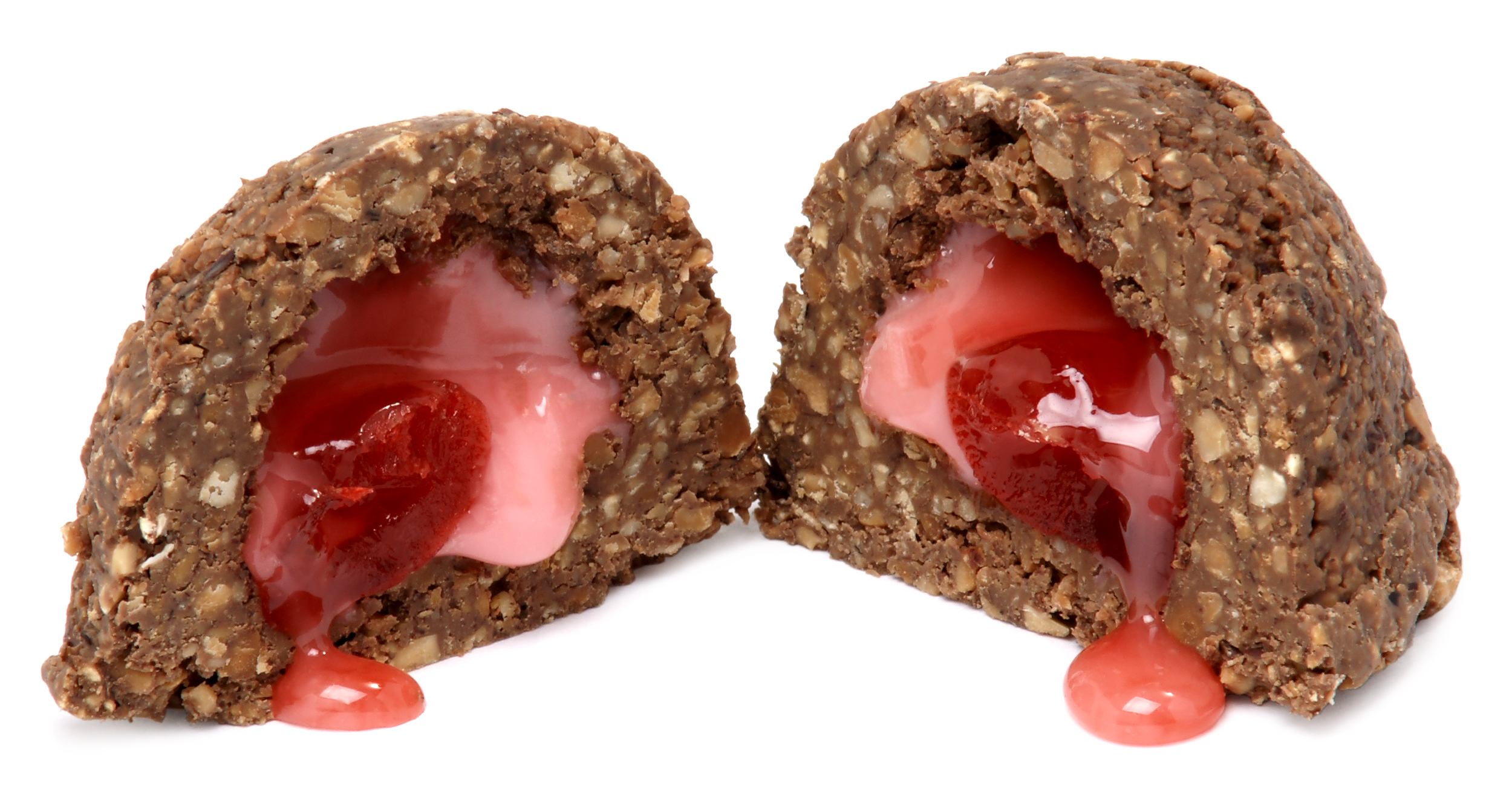
Cherry Cocktail split

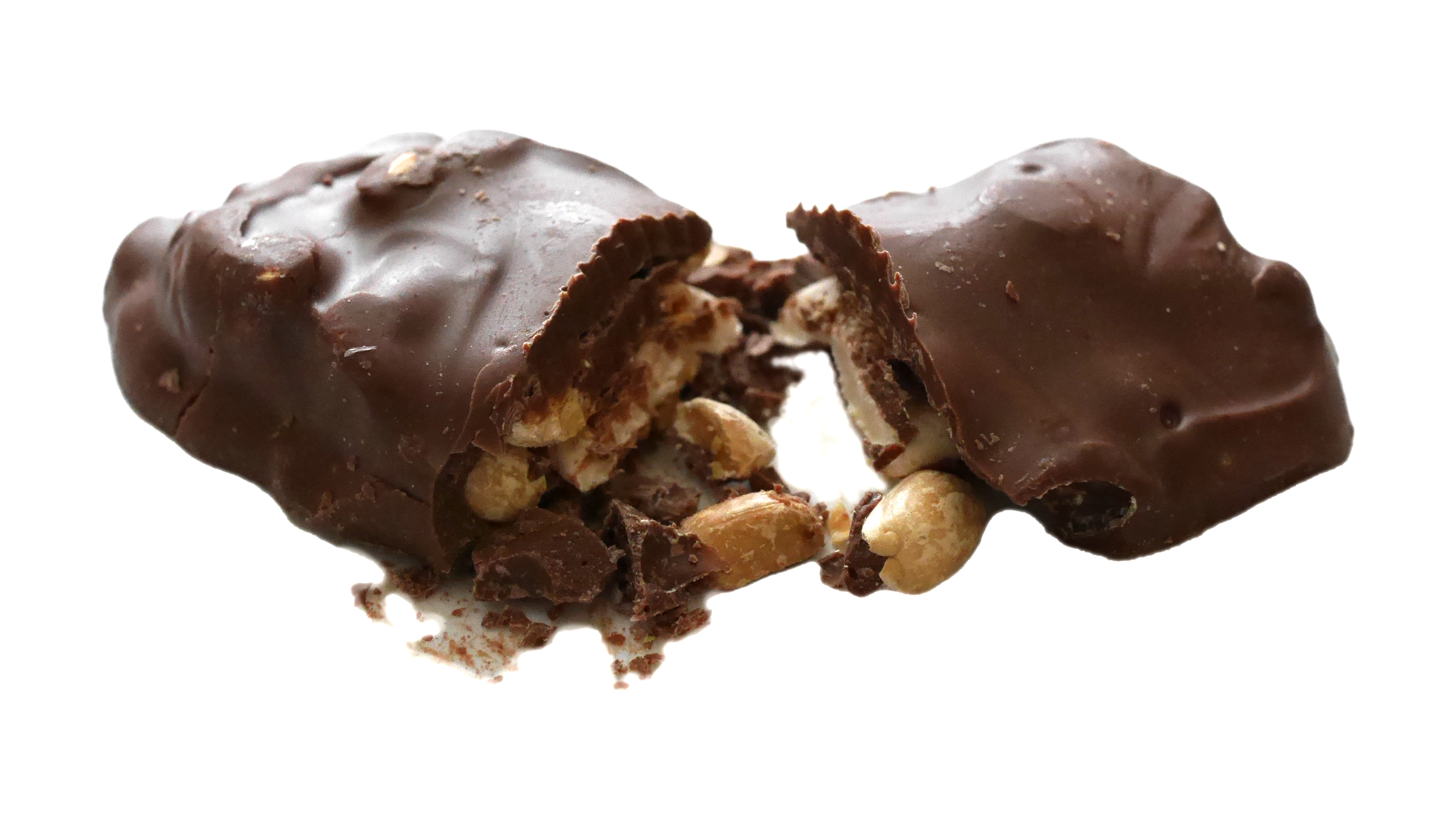
Old Faithful split

== See also ==
- List of chocolate bar brands
- List of companies based in Idaho
