= Idaho Potato Museum =

Museum in Blackfoot, Idaho, United States

Coordinates: 43°11′22″N 112°20′37″W

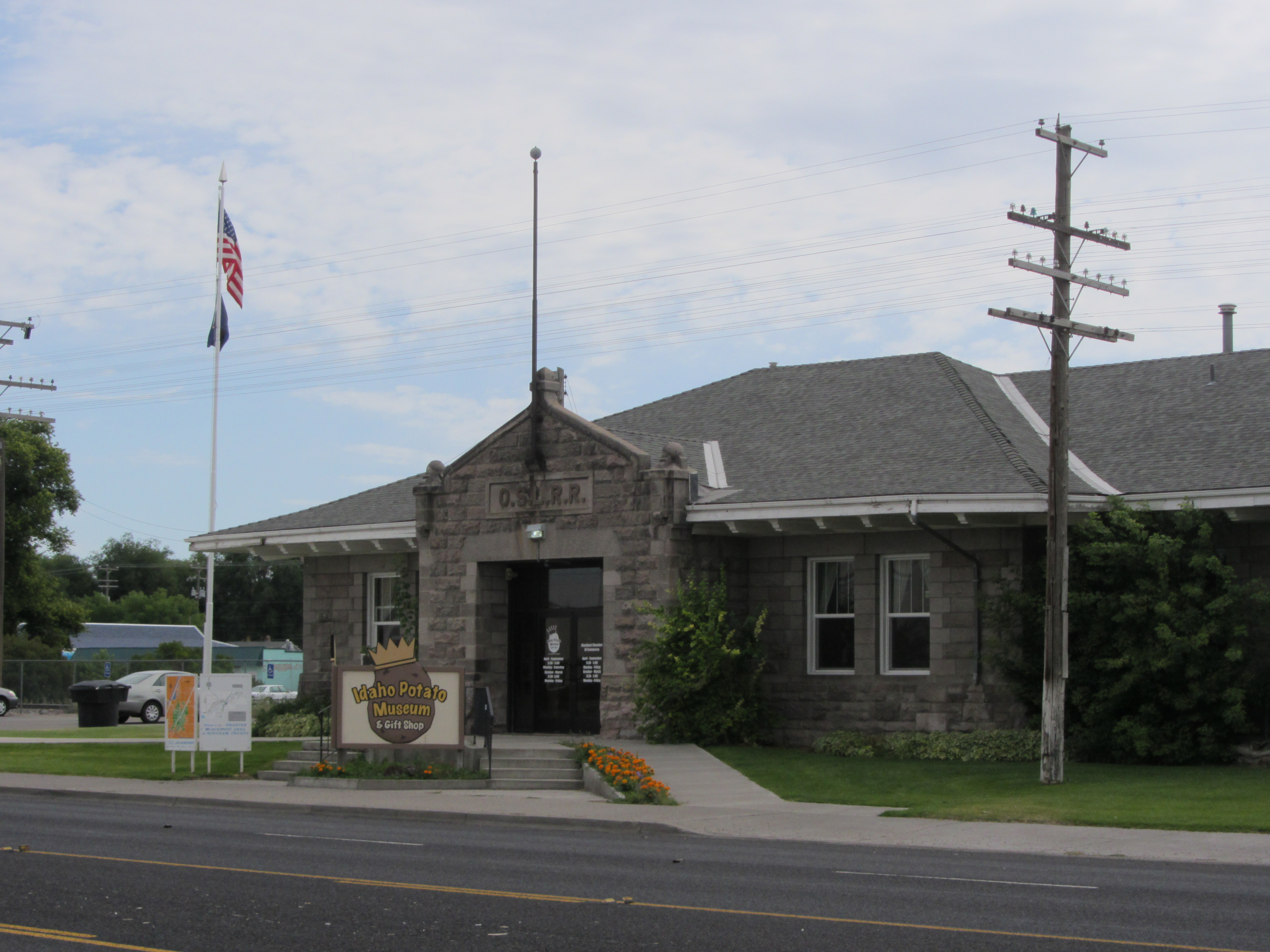
Entrance to the Idaho Potato Museum

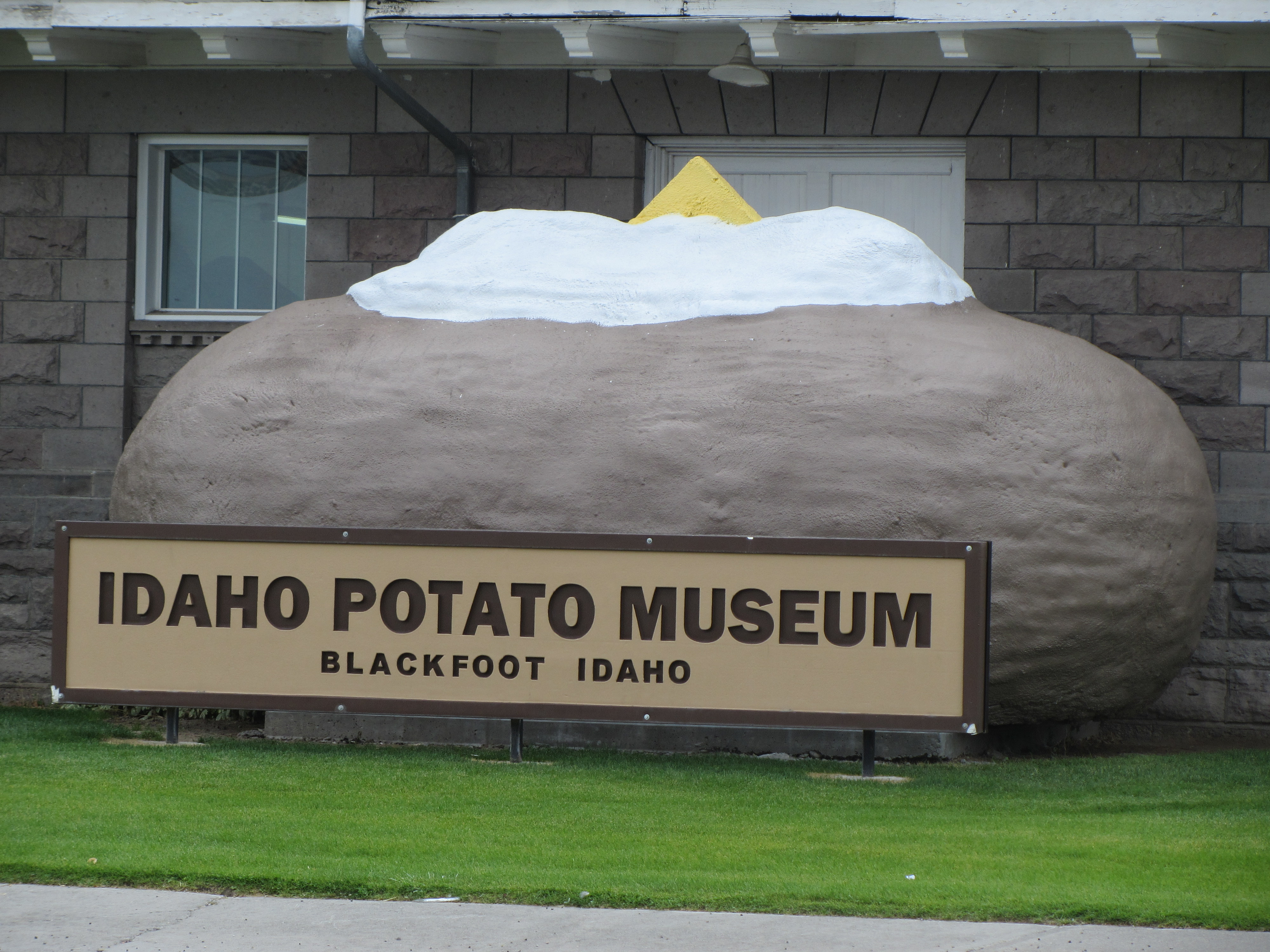
Outside of the Idaho Potato Museum

The Idaho Potato Museum is a museum devoted to the potato, located in Blackfoot, Idaho.

== History ==
=== Building ===
The building that currently holds the Idaho Potato Museum was originally known as the Oregon Short Line Railroad Depot, a subsidiary of Union Pacific Railroad. Construction of the building began in October 1912 and finished on August 15, 1913. For several years, a group of local residents involved in the potato industry discussed strategies to highlight the importance of potatoes to the local economy, and to showcase famous potato memorabilia. When Union Pacific Railway donated the Blackfoot railroad station depot building to Blackfoot City, the idea of turning the building into a potato museum was suggested and agreed upon.

=== Working group ===
The original potato museum working group comprised members of the Blackfoot potato industry and local officials. This group included:

- Dean Yancey
- Allan Larsen
- Keith Hinckley
- Brian Finnigan
- Dean Hill
- Walter Gay
- Rex Call
- Claude Johnson
- Maureen Hill

=== Community debate ===
Some members of the local community lacked enthusiasm for the idea, and questioned, "Why would tourists travel to Idaho to visit a potato museum?" However, the working group was not deterred and continued to undertake promotional work within the Blackfoot community. In February 1988, the working group invited the director of the Buffalo Bill Museum in Cody, Wyoming to speak at a public Chamber of Commerce meeting. He addressed the topic of specialized museums, imparting a message to Blackfoot that "sometimes we don't see the gold in our own backyard."

As support for the potato museum gained popularity amongst the community, the focus of the working group's discussions involved selecting a name for the museum. Many in the Blackfoot community felt that the term "museum" conjured up negative associations with "dusty, old relics". As the working group processed this feedback, they discussed strategies to ensure that the potato project appealed to a wide range of people; hence the moniker, the "Idaho's World Potato Exposition" was decided upon.

=== Trial opening ===
After many years of disuse and project obstacles, the site was uninhabitable and had no restroom facilities. A "working-bee" was held to clean the building and prepare it for opening.

A trial opening was held in the summer of 1988, which was attended by approximately 2,000 people from the local and immediately surrounding areas. The trial, a success, did not contain any real displays and simply involved a series of divider-style signs with ideas written on them, describing what the planned displays would show.

Consolidating upon the success of the launch, Maureen Hill volunteered to undertake the role of director (unpaid). Hill continued in the directorial role until 1989 when the expo was officially opened for tourists. In its first year of operation, the expo attracted 5,000 visitors.

=== Material support ===
Material and financial donations were provided by:

- The commercial potato industry (including companies Basic American Foods and Nonpareil)
- Local potato growers
- The local community
- The local county (Bingham County)
- The City of Blackfoot

== Management ==
The potato expo has been managed by multiple potato boards.

Nancy Batchelder, who served in the position for four years, was the first full-time paid director of the potato expo. Batchelder and Hill are credited with the success of the "Free 'Taters for Out-of-Staters" campaign. In 2002, Sandi Thomas was appointed director of the expo. At the time, the expo was experiencing severe financial hardship; however, Thomas was able to manage the expo's financial difficulties, ensuring the expo remained operational.

In May 2002, Blackfoot Mayor Scott Reese approached the Blackfoot Chamber of Commerce executive director, Merlin Wright, with a proposal that involved the expo being managed and housed by the Chamber. After discussion, all the parties involved were amenable to the proposal, and staff moved into their offices in June 2002. The Idaho World Potato Exposition Corporation was formally dissolved and new papers were drawn up and filed on September 17, 2002. The former expo is now legally known as the Potato Museum, Inc., trading under the name Idaho Potato Expo.

Under the direction of the Chamber of Commerce, a new board of directors for the Potato Museum, Inc. was appointed. Deby Barrington was appointed president of the board, and Merlin Wright served as director for the Idaho Potato Museum, Inc. and Blackfoot Chamber of Commerce. In 2007, Merlin Wright resigned from both positions and was replaced by Stephanie Govatos. Govatos served as the director for four years, before retiring to Florida with her family. The Museum Director as of 2012 is Tish Dahman.

== Exhibits ==
Exhibit displays are donated from a combination of community and commercial sources. One of the most popular displays in the museum is the world's largest potato crisp, donated by Pringles of Procter & Gamble.

The museum's exhibits include the world's largest potato chip, measuring 25 by 14 inches, and a timeline history of potato consumption in the US (including the introduction of fries to the White House menu selection during the presidency of Thomas Jefferson). Also on display are Peruvian-made 1,600-year-old vessels that are believed to be the first containers used specifically for potato storage. A Hall of Fame acknowledging significant contributions to the potato industry is also an ongoing feature of the museum.

== Gift shop and cafe ==
The Spud Seller gift shop is attached to the museum and offers merchandise with a potato or Idaho theme. The shop was initially a small enterprise that only sold items on consignment; however, in recent years, gift shop items have been purchased from multiple commercial wholesalers, representing a significant growth in the operation of the business. In 2016, the museum renovated the baggage claim area of the depot which was used for storage, and opened the Potato Station Café. The café opened on Memorial Day weekend. The café serves baked potatoes, French fries, and other potato-based foods such as potato bread, potato cupcakes, and chocolate-dipped potato chips.

== See also ==
- Idaho Spud
