= Mountain West Airlines-Idaho =

IATA	ICAO	Call sign
FX	-	-
- Commenced operations: January 29, 1979; 46 years ago
- Ceased operations: March 5, 1981; 44 years ago
- Hubs: Boise Airport
- Destinations: See Destinations below

Mountain West Airlines-Idaho (IATA: FX) was a short-lived commuter airline based in Boise, Idaho. Its motto was "Nobody knows the Mountain West like we do!"

== History ==
Formed shortly after the Airline Deregulation Act was signed by President Jimmy Carter in October 1978, Mountain West's first flight was on January 29, 1979, Flights continued for over two years, until the service termination on March 5, 1981; its last published timetable was February 14, 1981.

In Idaho, its main competitors were Gem State Airlines, Cascade Airways, and to a lesser extent Hughes Airwest (later Republic Airlines). (Horizon Air entered service in 1981.)

Services to Lewiston and Coeur d'Alene were undertaken from December 1980 after Gem State had abandoned its Idaho services and relocated to California. Service to Butte was started from December 1980 after Cascade Airways discontinued the route.

Mountain West filed for Chapter 11 bankruptcy in March 1981 and did not re-emerge.

== Destinations ==
Cities in Idaho served at various times were Boise, Pocatello, Twin Falls, Idaho Falls, Sun Valley, Lewiston, and Coeur d'Alene. Also served were Reno, Nevada, Salt Lake City, Utah, Rock Springs, Wyoming, and Butte, Montana.

== Fleet ==
Mountain West operated Embraer EMB 110 Bandeirante commuter turboprops in scheduled passenger service and occasionally Piper PA-31 Navajo prop aircraft for both passenger and freight runs.

3 - Embraer EMB 110 Bandeirante (2 in service, 1 as back-up)

? - Piper PA-31 Navajo

1 - Piper PA-24 Comanche

== Similar name ==
- Mountain West Airlines (1977)
- Mountain West Airlines (1979)
- Mountain West Airlines (1985)
- Mountain West Airlines (1994)
- Mountain West Airlines

== See also ==
- List of companies based in Idaho
- List of defunct airlines of the United States
