= Pod Point =

Electric vehicle charging provider

Pod Point Group Holdings PLC
- Company type: Public limited company
- Industry: Electric vehicles
- Founded: 2009
- Headquarters: London, United Kingdom
- Key people: Melanie Lane, CEO
- Products: Electric vehicle charging infrastructure
- Revenue: ▼£52.91 million (2024)
- Operating income: ▼ -£85.09 million (2024)
- Net income: ▼ -£84.71 million (2024)
- Total assets: ▼£55.76 million (2024)
- Total equity: ▼£17.60 million (2024)
- Parent: EDF Energy
- Website: www.pod-point.com

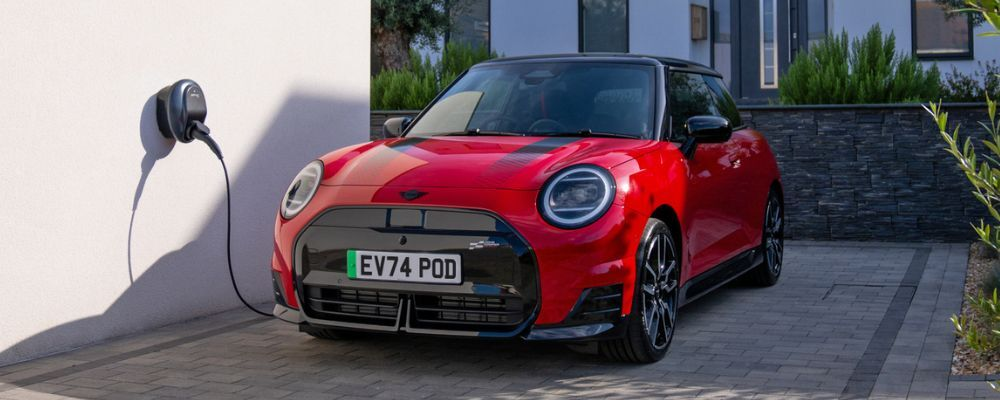
An electric car being charged by a Pod Point Solo 3S

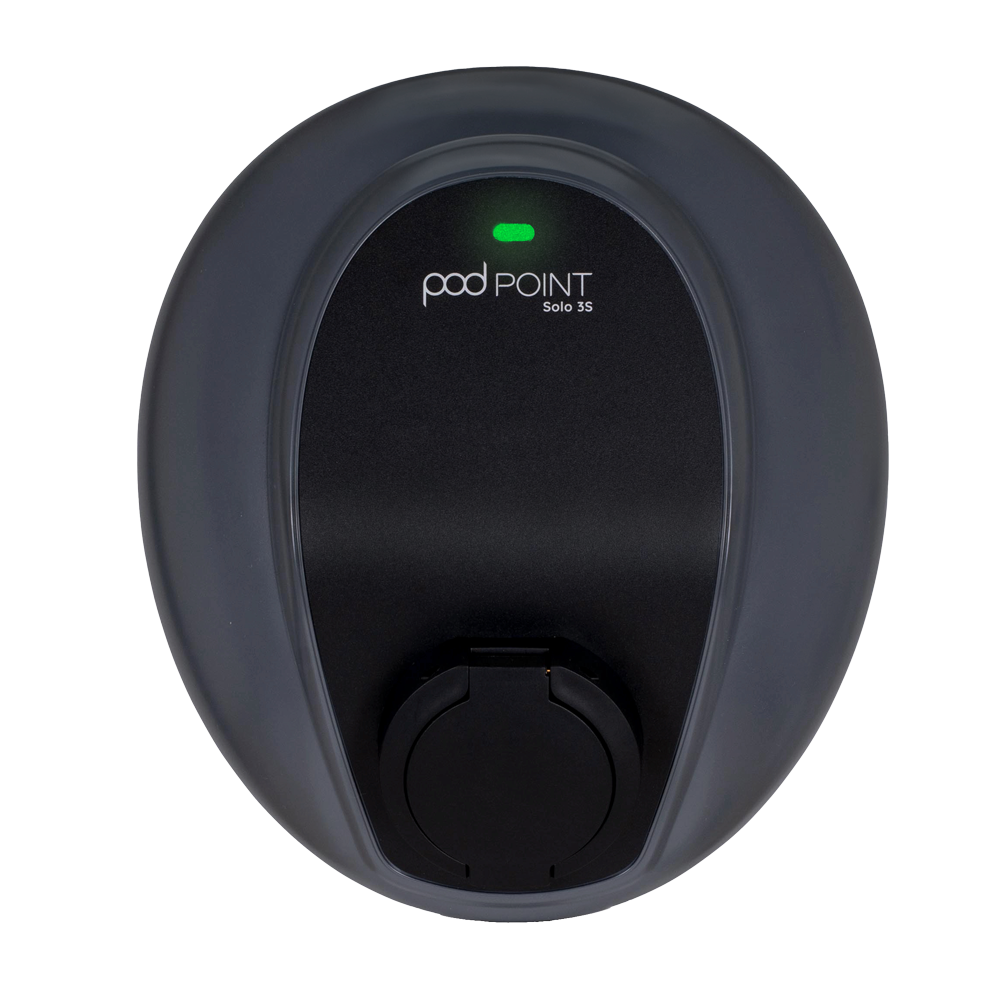
Pod Point Universal Solo 3S

Pod Point Group Holdings plc, trading as Pod Point, is a British electric vehicle charging stations company. As of 2025, the company operates the third largest public charging network in the UK.

== History ==
Pod Point was founded in 2009 by Erik Fairbairn and Peter Hiscocks having previously worked together to found and sell the supercar club Ecurie25.

In 2018, the company installed 600 charging stations following joint venture between Tesco and Volkswagen in the UK.

In 2018, Pod Point launched its Electric Schools initiative.

On 9 November 2021, Pod Point floated on the London Stock Exchange at a £352 million valuation.

In 2022, it was announced EDF Energy had bought a 53 percent stake in the company through a joint venture with Legal and General Capital.

In June 2022, Pod Point and BMW Group UK signed a three-year deal, which added Pod Point as a preferred EV home charge point supplier for BMW and Mini retail customers.

In July 2023, Pod Point appointed Andy Palmer as its interim chief executive. It was announced Melanie Lane would take over from Palmer in May 2024.

On 12 June 2025, Pod Point announced they had accepted an offer to sell the company to majority shareholder EDF Energy at a £10.6 million valuation, £341.4 million less than its initial public offering in 2021. The acquisition was completed on 4 August 2025.

== See also ==
- Electric vehicles
- Charging station
- Electric vehicle network
- Battery electric vehicle
- Plug-in hybrid electric vehicle
