= Andy Palmer =

British businessman

Andy Palmer CMG FIMechE
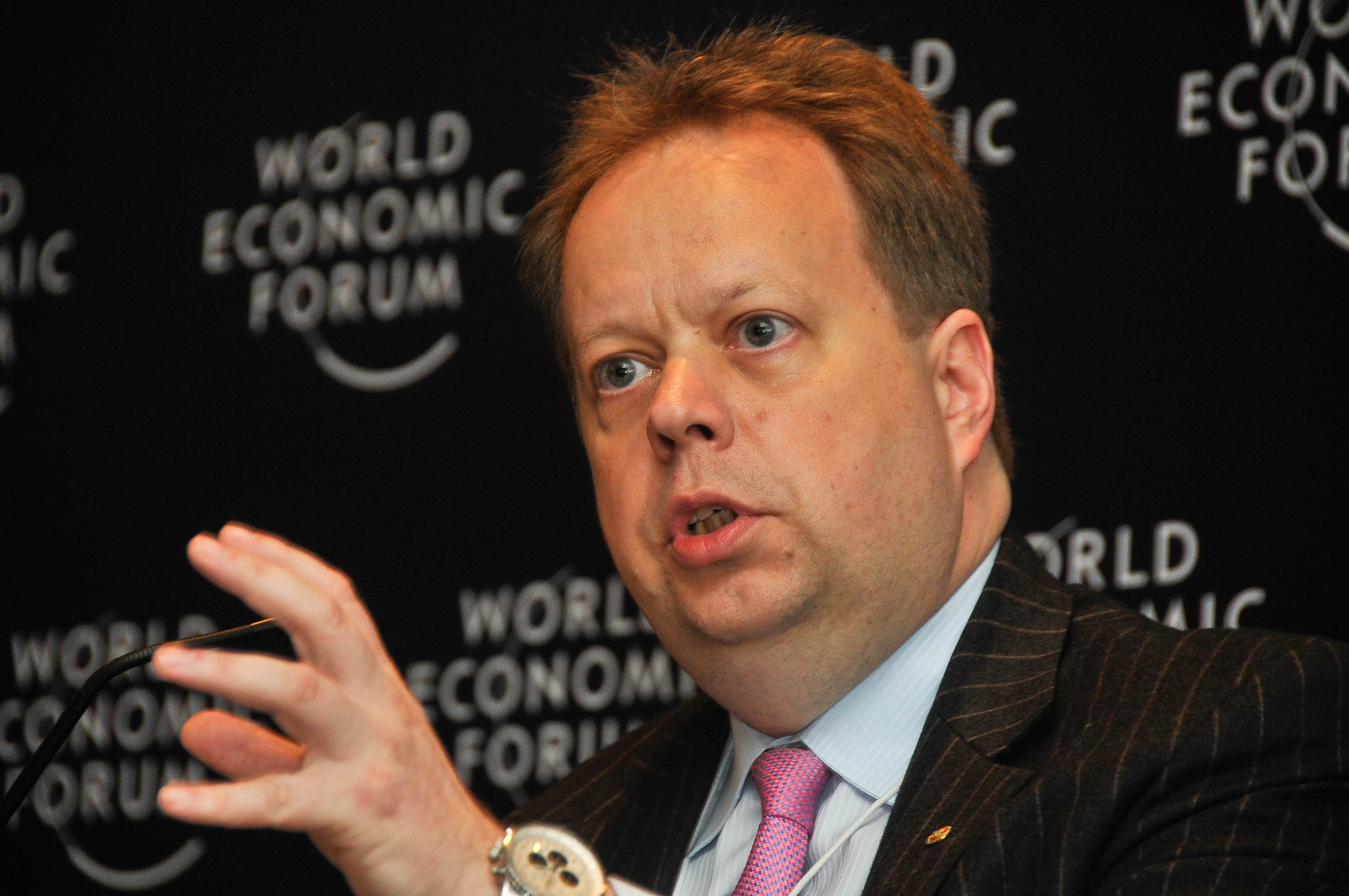
- Palmer in 2009
- Born: Andrew Charles Palmer; 30 June 1963 (age 63); Stratford-upon-Avon, Warwickshire, England
- Education: University of Warwick (MSc); Cranfield University (PhD)
- Occupations: Automotive executive; engineer
- Title: CEO at Palmer Automotive Ltd, Chairman at Pod Point
- Spouses: Alice (divorced); Hitomi (divorced)
- Children: 4
- Website: drandypalmer.com

Andrew Charles Palmer (born 30 June 1963) is an English automotive executive and engineer. He has been described as the 'Godfather of EVs' and the 'éminence grise' of the auto industry due to his work launching the Nissan Leaf in 2010 whilst COO at the Japanese company. Palmer is also known for launching Aston Martin's first SUV, the DBX, and first mid-engined sports car, Valkyrie, during his tenure as CEO from 2014 to 2020. Palmer was previously CEO and Executive Vice-chairman of electric bus and van company, Switch. He resigned from this role in 2022. Palmer was appointed Interim CEO of PodPoint in July 2023.

In addition, Palmer is founder and CEO of Palmer Automotive Ltd (most notably leading a bid on behalf of Punch, to acquire Nissan Motor Iberica in Barcelona), and Chairman of InoBat, a Slovak developer of electric vehicle 'intelligent' batteries, Chairman of Hilo Ltd, the EV Scooter manufacturer, Chairman of IONETIC, the battery pack technology company and Chairman of Brill Power, the battery technology provider.

In 2017, Palmer was appointed chairman of the productivity and skills commission of the new West Midlands Combined Authority (WMCA). He was previously the chief planning officer, executive vice-president and member of the executive committee of Nissan. Reporting directly to Nissan's president and CEO, Carlos Ghosn, Palmer shared the chief operating officer role with two Nissan executives. Palmer was also chairman of Infiniti, and president of Nissan Light Truck Co, a member of the board of directors of Nissan (China) Investment Company (NCIC), and of Nissan's joint ventures with India's Ashok Leyland.

== Early life ==
Palmer was born in June 1963 in Stratford-upon-Avon, England. Palmer attended Kineton High School.

Palmer entered a technical apprenticeship with UK Automotive Products Limited in 1979 at the age of 16. He received a master's degree (MSc) in Product Engineering from the University of Warwick, in July 1990, and a doctorate (PhD) in Engineering Management, from Cranfield University, in April 2004. Palmer is a Chartered Engineer and a Fellow of the Institution of Mechanical Engineers and a Fellow of the Royal Academy of Engineering. Palmer holds a Diploma in Industrial Management from Coventry University. Palmer is a member and former board member of SAE International and a Companion of the Chartered Management Institute

He was given honorary doctorates by Coventry and Cranfield Universities, and is a professor at Coventry University, industrial professor at Warwick University and a guest professor at the Tokyo University of Agriculture and Technology.

== Business career ==
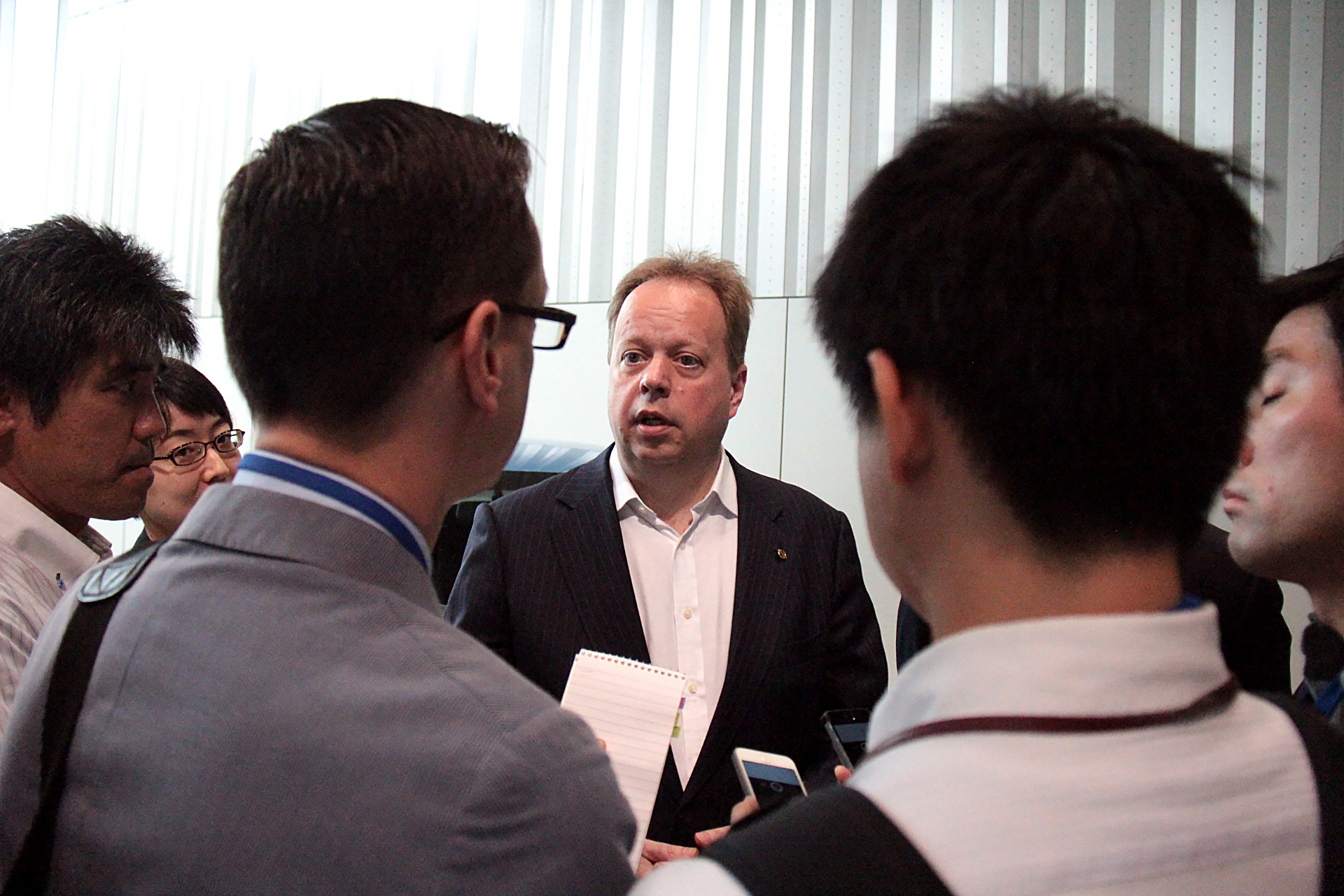
Andy Palmer, talking to reporters during e-NV200 launch in Yokohama

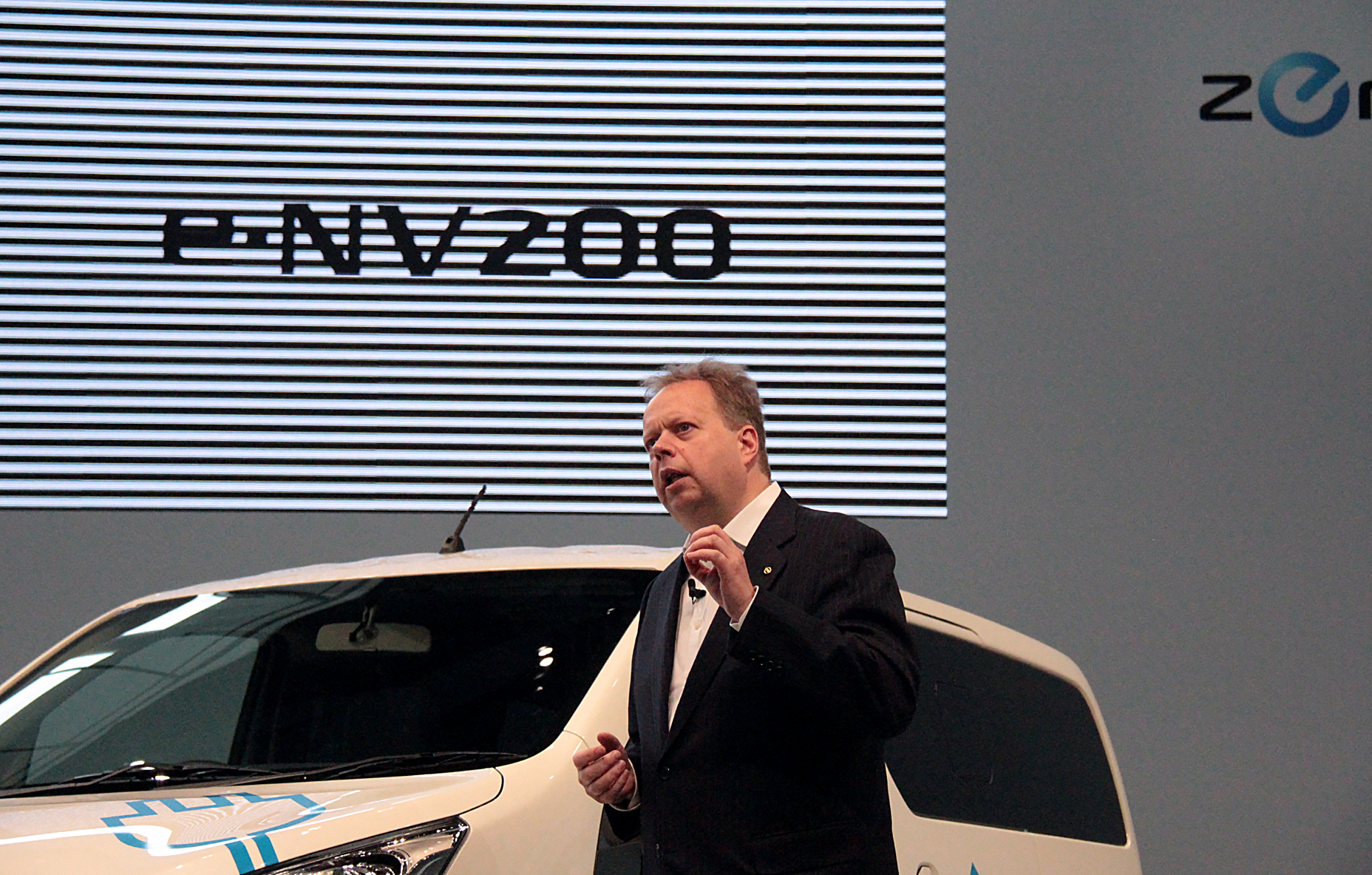
Andy Palmer at e-NV200 launch in Yokohama

Palmer started his professional career in 1983 as a project engineer of UK Automotive Products Limited. In 1991, he became manual transmission chief engineer of Rover Group. Latterly in his career, he was described by Automotive News Europe as an "engineer-turned-marketing guru [with a] raw instinct."

=== Nissan ===
Palmer joined Nissan in 1991 as business administration manager at the Nissan Technical Centre Europe (NTCE), where he became Deputy managing director in 2001 after managing vehicle design and testing.

In September 2002, Palmer moved to Japan, where he became program director for Nissan's Light Commercial Vehicles (LCVs).

Adding to his duties as Program Director, Palmer was named President of Nissan Motor Light Trucks Company Limited in 2003. After establishing the LCV business unit within Nissan in April 2004, Palmer was promoted in April 2005 to Corporate Vice-president in charge of the unit. In February 2009, Palmer was appointed Senior Vice-president, and entered Nissan's executive committee. In October 2010, Palmer's responsibility was extended to include Global Marketing, Brand and Communications. In April 2011, he was named Executive Vice-president.

In his position as Chief Planning Officer of Nissan, Andy Palmer was "responsible for global product planning, global program management, global market intelligence, global IS, global Infiniti business unit, global marketing communications, global corporate planning (including OEM business), zero emission vehicle planning and strategy, global battery business unit, and global sales."

At Nissan, Palmer is credited with pioneering new technologies, through his support of the Zeod hybrid Le Mans project and Bladeglider sports car concept.

At the 2011 Tokyo Motor Show, Palmer said that "it's complete bullshit" to assume that electric vehicles move the CO_{2} issue to the powerstation. Palmer conceded that EVs could pollute even less if electricity generation would be made greener across the globe.

Palmer was described as the "main proponent of electric vehicles" at Nissan and led on the development of the LEAF electric car. Bloomberg described Palmer as "instrumental in developing the Japanese carmaker's battery-powered LEAF."

In October 2013, Palmer called the Toyota 86 and the jointly developed Subaru BRZ "midlife crisis cars."

In March 2014, Palmer drew attention after Global NCAP tested a number of India's best-selling cars (including the Tata Nano, Suzuki-Maruti Alto 800, Ford Figo, Volkswagen Polo and Hyundai i10) and found their safety lacking. "I think the people who criticise these cars for not meeting US or European crash standards are living in a dream world," Palmer was quoted by Autocar. "We are talking about cars built to transport people who would otherwise be four or five-up on a motorcycle. These people today can't afford more, and if we fit safety systems we will drive the prices up and they'll choose the motorbike again. A car with a body and individual seats is much safer than a bike." A Nissan car was not among the tested vehicles.

=== Aston Martin ===
Palmer became chief executive of Aston Martin in October 2014. He has gained recognition for making Aston Martin, which is known for its unprofitability, into a profitable business.

"From a very early age I wanted to be the CEO of a car company," Palmer told Autocar, "but when I decided to take this one from Nissan, I was pretty sure people would say I was mad."

Arriving at Aston Martin in 2014, Palmer introduced new equity, an expansion plan, and cost reduction. He "put funding in place to launch one new model at least every year," sanctioned a new logistics center and a new factory in Wales to build the DBX SUV. At the 2015 Geneva Motor Show, Palmer had presented Aston Martin's "Second Century Plan," and he unveiled the DBX crossover concept he had commissioned when new into the job as Aston Martin CEO.

In Palmer's first year at Aston Martin, a decline of retail sales was reversed, with a year-on-year 11% growth. Under Palmer's early leadership between 2014 and 2017, EBITDA had quadrupled and the company returned to profit.

Drawing on his time working in Japan, Palmer imported various elements of Japanese corporate culture at Aston Martin, including a greater emphasis on teamwork and minimising internal politics.

Palmer's tenure at Aston Martin saw the launch of four core car models with nine derivatives; the DB11, Vantage, DBS Superleggera and DBX. Palmer also oversaw Aston Martin's move towards a mid-engined car bloodline, culminating in the launch of the Valkyrie expected in late 2020.

==== Public offering ====
After being credited with "completing a turnaround for the once perennially loss-making company", in October 2018 Palmer announced the company's IPO on the London Stock Exchange. Following the initial float, the company faced challenges during the 2019 automotive downturn.

Following the IPO, analysts suggested Palmer had the "toughest job in the industry" and that alongside Brexit and the global automotive slump "blame [for the company's market performance] probably lies with Aston's private equity owners and its multiple advisers for seeking too high a price and encouraging the company to go to market with an excessively hubristic and overwrought script."

The Sunday Times wrote that Palmer has "fought for the past year with one hand tied behind his back. Aston's private equity shareholders, the Italian fund Investindustrial and Kuwait's Investment Dar, sold about 25% of their shares in the listing, raking in £1.1bn. But, reluctant to be diluted via a share issue, they did not allow Aston to raise any fresh capital. That meant it brought in new investors, but no new money, and so started life as a public company already up to its neck in debt."

Car and Driver questioned: "But could Palmer have altered his destiny? Even 20/20 hindsight struggles to discern a clearer path. The IPO was the only obvious way to defuse tensions between the existing investors who were clamoring to get their cash back. It's hard to imagine simple changes that could have sold many more cars or even a much quicker launch for the DBX."

To stabilize the company, Palmer led Aston Martin through two debt raises, a Rights Issue and private placement, raising £536million. This took place as Palmer navigated the company through the COVID-19 outbreak, which had a severe impact on demand throughout the automotive industry.

==== Departure ====
The Aston Martin board announced on 26 May 2020 that Palmer was leaving Aston Martin after almost six years, to be replaced by Tobias Moers. Car and Driver noted, "once Lawrence Stroll had taken a substantial stake in the company — one Palmer had fought against — it was clear that change was coming." Before Palmer left, the Aston Martin share price had declined 94% since floatation and the price increased 40% on the day of the announcement; three directors also left.

On his departure from Aston Martin, Palmer was praised by Steve Fowler of Auto Express for producing Aston Martin's "best ever line up" and for "leaving the company in a better place than when he joined." Car and Driver agreed: "Palmer leaves Aston looking stronger than it ever has, and that wasn't enough to save him."

After leaving Aston Martin, Palmer spoke to The Guardian newspaper and reflected on his tenure at the company, commenting "if you tell the story of going from £420m to £2bn, it's an amazing turnaround." Since leaving Aston Martin, Palmer has been described as the "architect of modern Aston Martin, developing the brand from an also-ran former Ford cast off to a real player in the segment".

=== InoBat Auto ===
In October 2020, Palmer was appointed non-executive vice-chairman of a Slovak battery manufacturer, InoBat Auto. In March 2022, Palmer was appointed as chairman of the company.

=== Optare/Switch Mobility ===
In July 2020, Optare, a UK maker of buses, announced that Palmer was appointed non-executive chairman. Optare is a subsidiary of Indian company Ashok Leyland, where Palmer served as a non-executive board member since 2015. During his time at Nissan, Palmer was a board member of a Nissan joint-venture with Ashok Leyland. Nissan ended the joint-venture in 2016. In July 2021, Palmer was appointed as CEO and Executive Vice-chairman of the newly re-branded Optare, now known as Switch Mobility. In August 2021, Switch secured an investment that valued the company at $1.8 billion. Palmer resigned from his role at Switch Mobility in November 2022. In January 2023, Switch Mobility announced the launch of the IeV series, which Palmer worked on, to address the growing requirement of last-mile and mid-mile mobility applications in India.

=== Palmer Automotive Ltd. ===
In mid-2020, Palmer founded Palmer Automotive, a vehicle for Palmer to deploy "more than four decades' experience in the auto industry to do something good for the planet". Via Palmer Automotive Ltd, Palmer works with multiple organisations operating in the net zero space.

=== UK government ===
Palmer advises the UK government in export matters as an ambassador for the GREAT Britain campaign. In 2016, Palmer was asked to be an advisor to the UK Prime Minister in the area of Skills and Apprenticeships. Palmer serves as an Honorary Group Captain of the Royal Air Force. In January 2021, Palmer wrote to the UK Secretary of State for Business, Energy and Industrial Strategy, Kwasi Kwarteng MP, declaring the UK urgently needed to plan for four factories for electric vehicle batteries in order for the UK car industry to stay competitive. In January 2021, Palmer submitted evidence to the parliamentary Science and Technology Select Committee on the role hydrogen can play in reaching Net Zero. In September 2021, Palmer announced he was appointed as an Ambassador for the government's Business Climate Leaders campaign ahead of COP26.

=== PodPoint ===
Palmer has been a Senior Independent Director at PodPoint since 2021. In July 2023, he was named as Interim CEO. Palmer became Non-Executive Chairman at PodPoint in May 2024.

=== Palmer Energy Technology Limited ===
In 2025, Palmer co-founded Palmer Energy Technology Limited (PETL). In August 2025, Palmer announced PETL had acquired Brill Power and raised €5.7 million.

== Palmer Foundation ==
In September 2018, Palmer announced a charitable foundation to fund apprenticeships targeting young people from disadvantaged background. According to an Aston Martin statement, "the charitable foundation will operate independently of the apprenticeship scheme at Aston Martin Lagonda, which earlier this month welcomed its biggest ever intake of 50 apprentices and 26 graduates."

== Recognition ==
- In 2012, Palmer was designated No. 1 in the "Top 50 Most Influential British People in the Global Automotive Business 2012" and selected to Auto Express Hall of Fame.
- In 2013, Palmer was named the automotive industry's most influential, and the world's third most influential chief marketing officer (after Phil Schiller of Apple Inc. and Younghee Lee of Samsung) by the CMO Influence Study, conducted by marketing firm Appinions for Forbes magazine.
- Under CMO Palmer, Nissan's Interbrand score entered the top 100 in 2011, and moved to 65 in 2013. Among Interbrand's Best Global Green Brands 2013, Nissan took No. 5. Interbrand credited Palmer with "elevating marketing to a science."
- Palmer was appointed Companion of the Order of St Michael and St George (CMG) in the 2014 New Year Honours for services to the British automotive industry.
- In 2014, Palmer was voted one of EVO's "25 most important people of the car industry."
- In 2016, Palmer was selected for the first Cranfield University "Distinguished Manufacturing Alumnus/a of the Year Award".
- In 2017, Palmer was appointed Honorary Group Captain with the RAF.
- In 2018, Palmer was presented with the Lifetime Achievement Award by Auto Express.
- In 2018, Palmer won an Automotive News "All Star" award in the luxury car category.
- In 2021, Palmer appeared on BBC's Question Time and was introduced as "one of the most respected people in the [auto] business".
- In 2021, Palmer was awarded the 'Men as Allies' award by the Women's Engineering Society.
- In 2023, Palmer was inducted to the 'Motoring Hall of Fame'.

== Personal life ==
Palmer was married to Hitomi, who is Japanese, and they have one daughter. He has three children from an earlier marriage.

Palmer's hobbies include "reading, listening to punk rock, and running by necessity."

=== Racing ===
Palmer (not to be confused with the Bentley Team racing driver) is a licensed race car driver. He started racing while still at Nissan, driving a GT4 Nissan 370Z. A few months after taking the helm of Aston Martin, Palmer and his co-drivers, Marek Reichman, Alice Powell and Andrew Frankel, finished 5th overall and 4th in class at the Silverstone Britcar 24-Hour. He entered professional racing in 2017, when he applied for and received his MSA C Class international licence., and only weeks later, he finished 20th overall and 2nd in class SP3, co-driven by chef and racer Paul Holywood, racer Pete Cate and motorsport commentator John Hindhaugh in an Vantage GT8 at the 2017 Hankook 24H COTA USA.

Business positions
Preceded by Ulrich Bez (Executive chairman)	Chief Executive of Aston Martin; October 2014 – May 2020	Succeeded by Tobias Moers
