= Idaho Spud =

Candy bar made in Idaho

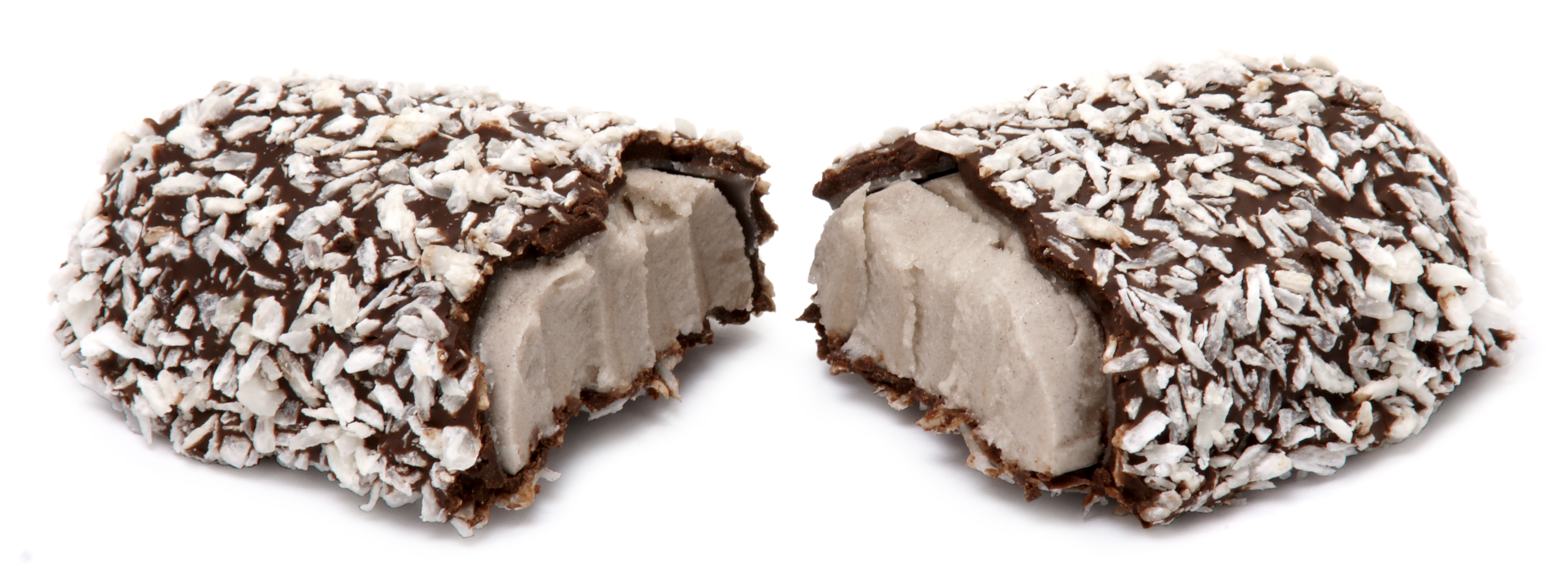
- Product type: Candy
- Current owner: Idaho Candy Company
- Country: Boise, Idaho, United States
- Introduced: 1918; 108 years ago
- Website: www.idahospud.com

The Idaho Spud is a candy bar made by the Idaho Candy Company. It has continuously been in production since 1918 and is distributed primarily throughout the Pacific Northwest region of the United States. The wrapper of the product bears the slogan "The Candy Bar That Makes Idaho Famous". The bar was invented by Thomas "T.O." Smith, who founded the Idaho Candy Company in 1901. The potato- (spud) shaped bar consists of a chocolate and coconut flakes covered cocoa-flavored marshmallow center.

== Sales ==
According to the Idaho Candy Company, the Idaho Spud is in the top 100 best-selling candy bars in the Northwest United States. The bar is sold at room temperature, but is sometimes frozen before consumption. They are also sold as bite size candies in clear plastic tubs.

== Candy content ==
The candy bar consists of a cocoa-flavored marshmallow center which is covered with compound chocolate (a chocolate replacement made from cocoa, sugar, and vegetable fats) and sprinkled with coconut flakes. The oblong shape of the candy bar resembles a potato. The product has 180 calories and weighs 1.5 ounces or 43 grams.

=== Ingredients ===
- Sugar, corn syrup, coconut, fractionated palm kernel oil, invert sugar, corn starch, cocoa powder, chocolate liquor, egg albumen, agar agar, salt, soy lecithin, nonfat milk powder, vanilla, artificial flavors, and potassium sorbate.
- Allergens: tree nuts (coconut), egg, soy, and milk products.

== In popular culture ==
The bar was featured in Steve Almond's book Candyfreak as one of the few successful candies made by a small company.

The bar appears in an episode of the Adult Swim comedy program On Cinema, season 9, episode 8.

== See also ==
- Idaho Potato Museum
- Irish potato candy, another potato-related candy
- List of confectionery brands
