= Irish potato candy =

Candy from Southeast Pennsylvania, US

Irish tater
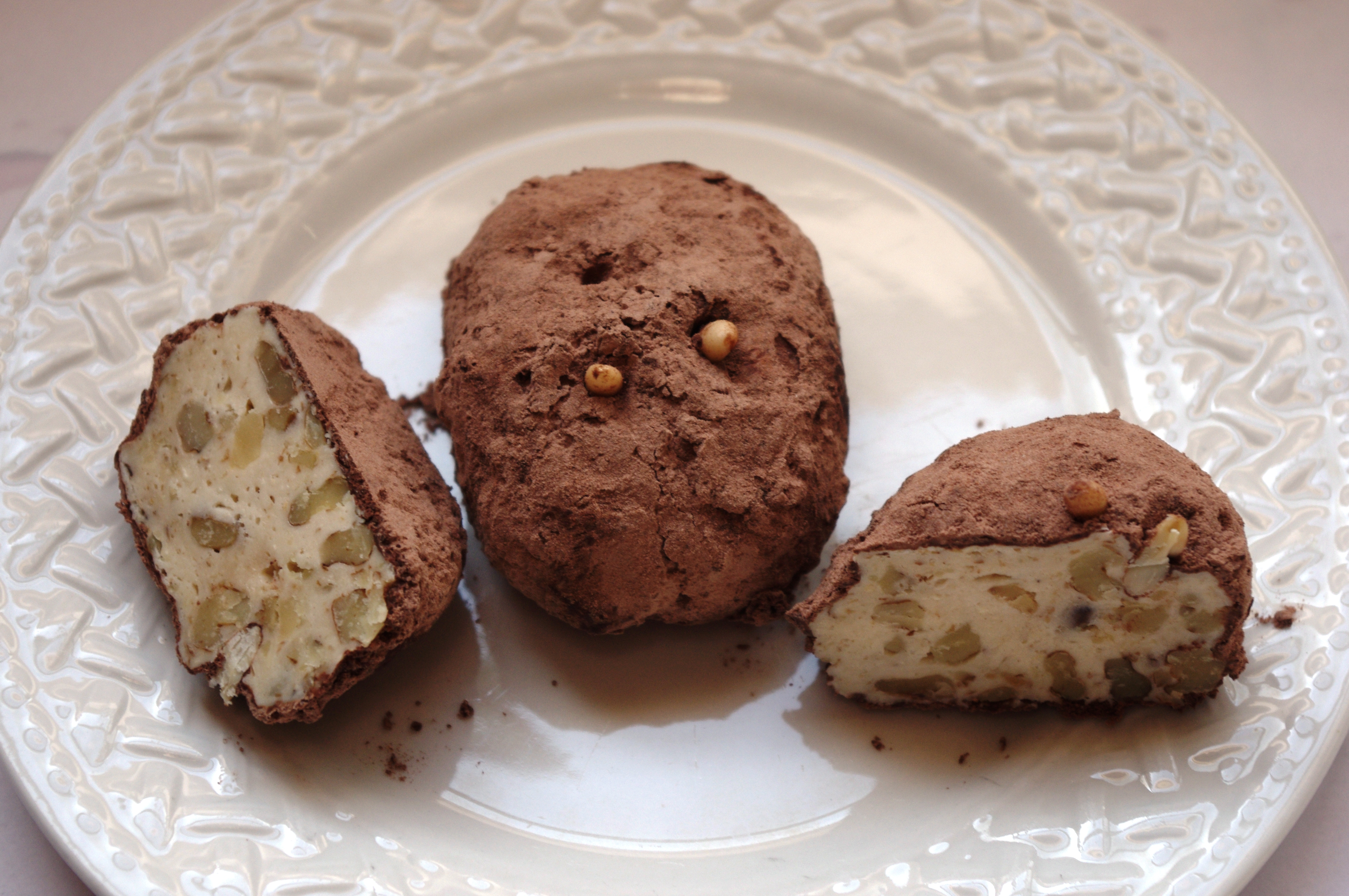
- Irish potato candy from See's of South San Francisco with cream cheese, cinnamon, sugar and nuts
- Type: Candy
- Place of origin: United States
- Region or state: Philadelphia, Pennsylvania
- Main ingredients: Cinnamon, sugar, coconut and cream cheese

Irish potato candy

Irish potato candy is a traditional candy from Philadelphia, Pennsylvania. Despite its name, it is not from Ireland, and does not usually contain any potato. The candies have a coconut cream inside (generally made from some blend of coconut, confectioner's sugar, vanilla, and cream or cream cheese) and are rolled in cinnamon on the outside, resulting in an appearance reminiscent of small potatoes. The treats are about the size of a large marble and are especially popular around St. Patrick's Day.

Oh Ryan's of Boothwyn, Pennsylvania, claims to be the largest distributor of Irish Potatoes, shipping about 80,000 pounds to major chains and smaller candy stores, mostly in the Philadelphia area. See's Candies, based in South San Francisco, also makes a version composed of a divinity and English walnut interior dusted with cocoa and using pine nuts as potato "eyes". The potatoes are showcased as a seasonal product by Philadelphia-area supermarkets, such as Acme Markets.

== Variants ==
While the commercial confection is usually coconut-cream–based, recipes for potato-based Irish Potato candy do exist. In these recipes, the potato is mashed, without any added liquid, and confectioner's sugar is added gradually. The coconut and vanilla are added while the mixture is still somewhat soft, to make blending easier, and additional confectioner's sugar is added until a consistency is reached that will allow rolling into bite-sized balls. The candy is allowed to dry for a couple of hours and then rolled in cinnamon to achieve the appearance of tiny potatoes. Drying the candy before rolling in the cinnamon keeps the cinnamon from becoming dark.

These recipes do not involve any use of heat after the cooking of the potato. When the sugar is added to the mashed potato, the mixture becomes liquid, then becomes gradually firmer as more sugar is added. Powdered cocoa can be substituted for the cinnamon for a slightly darker potato without the cinnamon's "bite". The coconut can be left out, or the candy can be dipped in chocolate. The potato and confectioner's sugar make a base for experimenting with other flavors, such as mint.

== See also ==
- Idaho Spud, another potato-related candy
