= Dave Smith Motors =

Car dealership in Kellogg, Idaho, United States

- Company type: Car Dealership
- Industry: Automobile
- Founded: 1965
- Headquarters: Kellogg, Idaho, United States
- Area served: United States (especially the Inland Northwest)
- Key people: Ken Smith (CEO)
- Products: Alfa Romeo, Buick, Cadillac, Chevrolet, Chrysler, Dodge, GMC Jeep, Maserati, Nissan, Ram, pre-owned vehicles
- Website: www.davesmith.com

Dave Smith Motors is a car dealership in Kellogg, Idaho, that attracts customers from all over the country. The dealership has a reputation for being the "World’s Largest Ram Dealer".

== History ==
Dave Smith Motors started in October 1965 in Wallace, Idaho. He purchased the small Chevrolet dealership from Mort Keane. At that time, the Chevrolets were sold mainly to miners, loggers, smelter workers and local businessmen in northern Idaho's Silver Valley. Five years later, he moved the dealership to Kellogg, Idaho. Today Dave Smith Motors carries Chrysler, General Motors, and Nissan products, according to the Dave Smith website.

Idaho's Silver Valley was founded in the 1800s silver boom and is one of the richest silver mining regions in the world. The community is located along Interstate 90 in northern Idaho's Shoshone County. The valley thrived for decades as one of the nation's greatest mining regions. Then, in 1981, the Bunker Hill mine in Kellogg closed. Over 2,000 jobs left with the mine sending the area into an economic downturn. The region also lost a lot of jobs in the timber industry. The population of the valley plummeted and car dealerships were losing the battle to stay in business. Dave Smith nearly lost the dealership.

As other dealerships were going out of business in the valley Dave Smith bought up nine other new car dealerships and sold all the brands under one roof. He also cut prices in an attempt to make up in volume what was lost in mark-ups. At any given time the dealership has more new vehicles on lots in town than the population of Kellogg.

Dave Smith Motors was one of the first car dealerships to take advantage of the Internet. In the late 1990s when many dealerships saw the Internet as a threat, Dave Smith embraced the Internet and used it as a tool to increase sales. Since the beginning of the list, Dave Smith Motors has ranked high on Ward's Auto e-Dealer 100 list. Dave Smith Motors uses the Internet to reach beyond the geographic confines of their remote location in Kellogg, Idaho.

The Internet changed the playing field for dealerships because Chrysler Corporation (now Fiat Chrysler Automobiles) allocates more cars to dealerships that sell more, a policy that rewards dealers who are able to boost their sales. Despite the concerns of competing dealerships Chrysler continued to ship even more vehicles to Dave Smith Motors, and assured other dealers that they could increase sales by improved customer service and referrals. The other dealerships were not pleased. In 1998 twenty-five Chrysler dealerships in five states threatened to boycott Chrysler Corporation if they did not reduce the number of cars they allocated to Dave Smith Motors. The Federal Trade Commission considered their boycott illegal and the group settled the charges before the boycott began.

In 2015, Dave Smith Motors was purchased by RFJ Auto Partners, a national dealership conglomerate. They sell on average 1,000 vehicles a month.

== Community contributions ==
Dave Smith Motors is one of the largest employers in Shoshone County, and the largest private company in Kellogg.

== Ownership ==
In April 2015, Dave Smith Motors was acquired by RFJ Auto Partners Inc. of Plano, Texas.

While on a family vacation in April 1994, Smith died in a snorkeling accident in the Caribbean Sea near Belize at age 58.

== See also ==
- List of companies based in Idaho
