= Scottevest =

American clothing company

Scottevest, Inc.
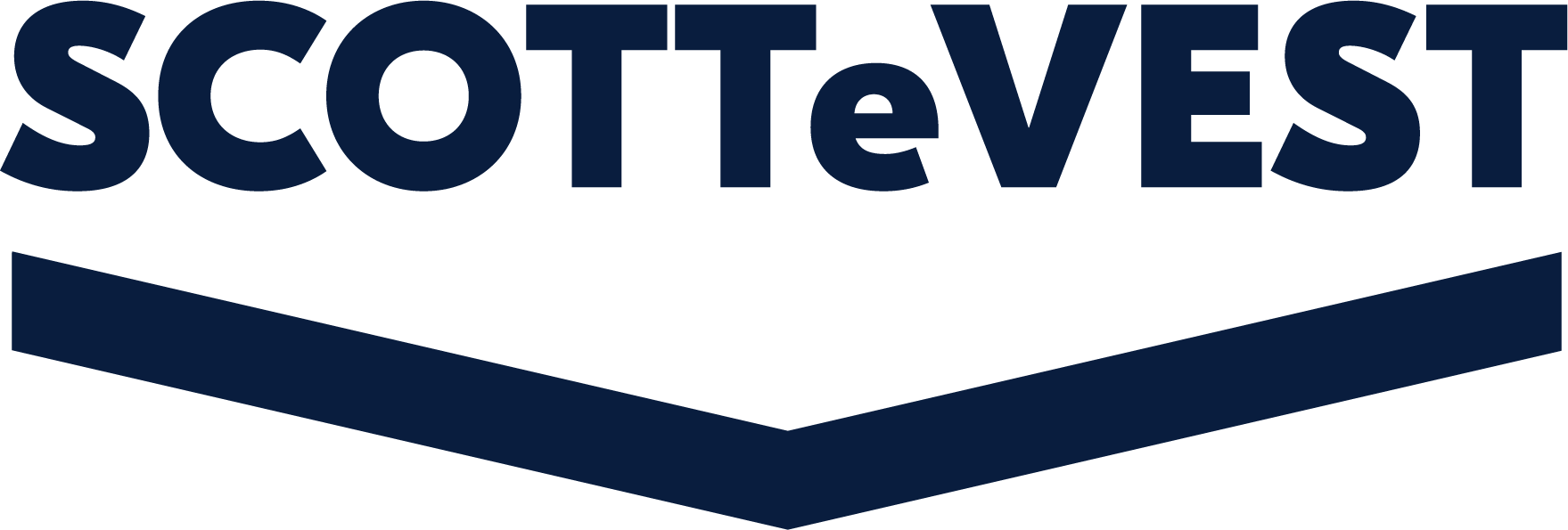
- Type: Private
- Industry: Apparel, Licensing
- Founder: Scott Jordan
- Headquarters: Ketchum, Idaho, U.S.
- Area served: Worldwide
- Products: Apparel
- Website: Scottevest.com

Scottevest, stylized as SCOTTeVEST, is a clothing company that specializes in clothing with multiple pockets and compartments for electronic devices and other personal items. It was founded in 2000 by Scott Jordan to address the lack of functional clothing options for people who needed to regularly carry multiple electronic devices.

Known for its innovative designs, Scottevest has been featured in various media outlets, including The New York Times and Forbes magazine. While their clothing is usually marketed towards travellers, the firm also caters to users in the military and law-enforcement who are required to carry multiple devices.

== Origins ==
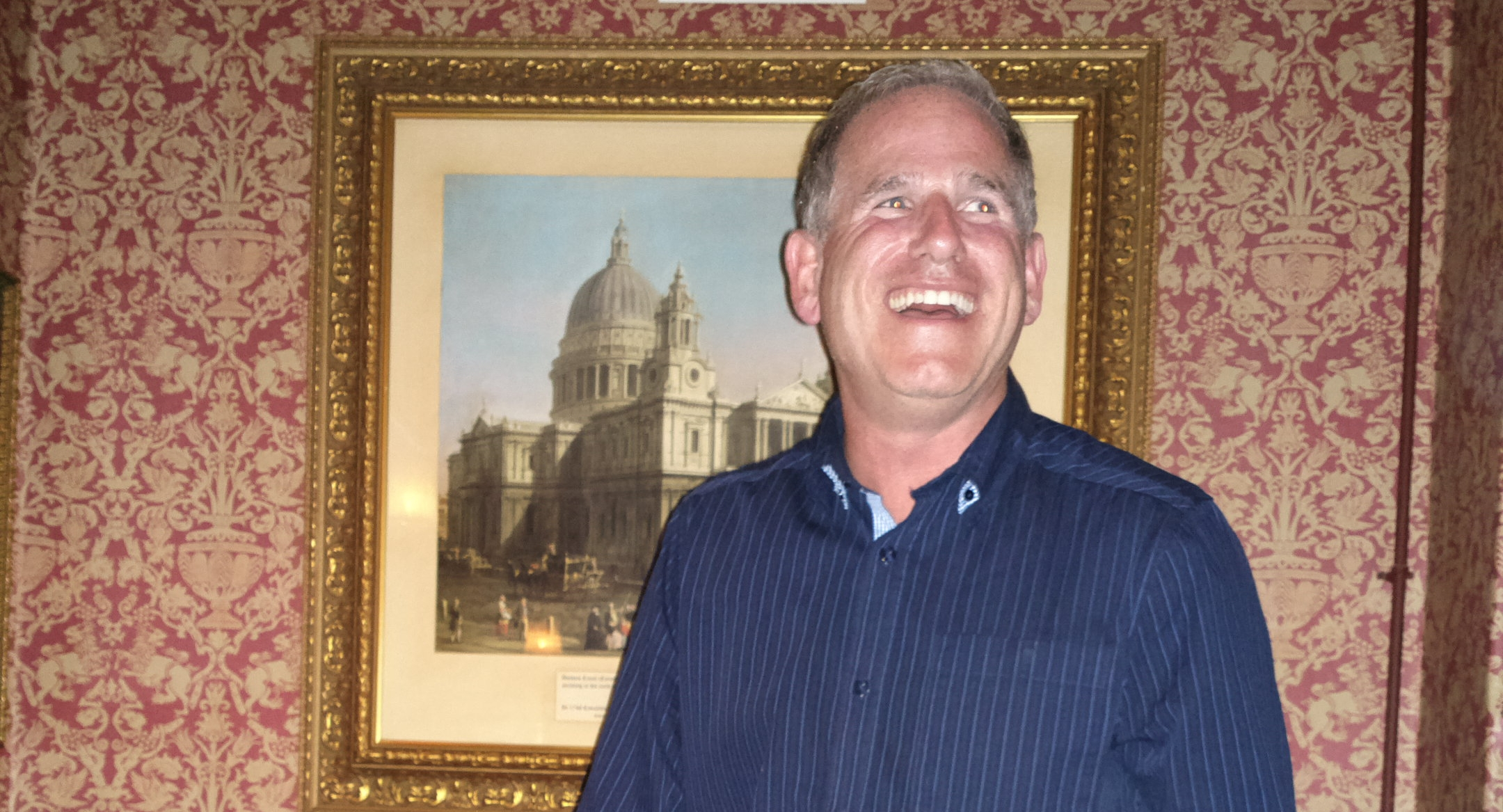
Scott Jordan in 2012

As 'Scott eVest' the company was founded by Scott Jordan in 2000 in Chicago, Illinois. 'eVest' references the company's first product, described as "a techie version of the classic fisherman's vest".

In 2002 the brand name was modified to reduce its similarity to IBM's lower-case 'e' following a lawsuit threat. In 2003, the company moved headquarters from Chicago to Ketchum, Idaho. In 2004, after another Idaho company, Scott USA sued the company for violating their company trademark by using the word "Scott," the case was settled by concatenation of Scott eVest into a single word. The company has been known as Scottevest since, recording a steady annual revenue growth from 20 to 40 percent. In December 2013 the company estimated the year's sales at 10 million dollars, 85% of this coming through the website.

== Merchandise ==
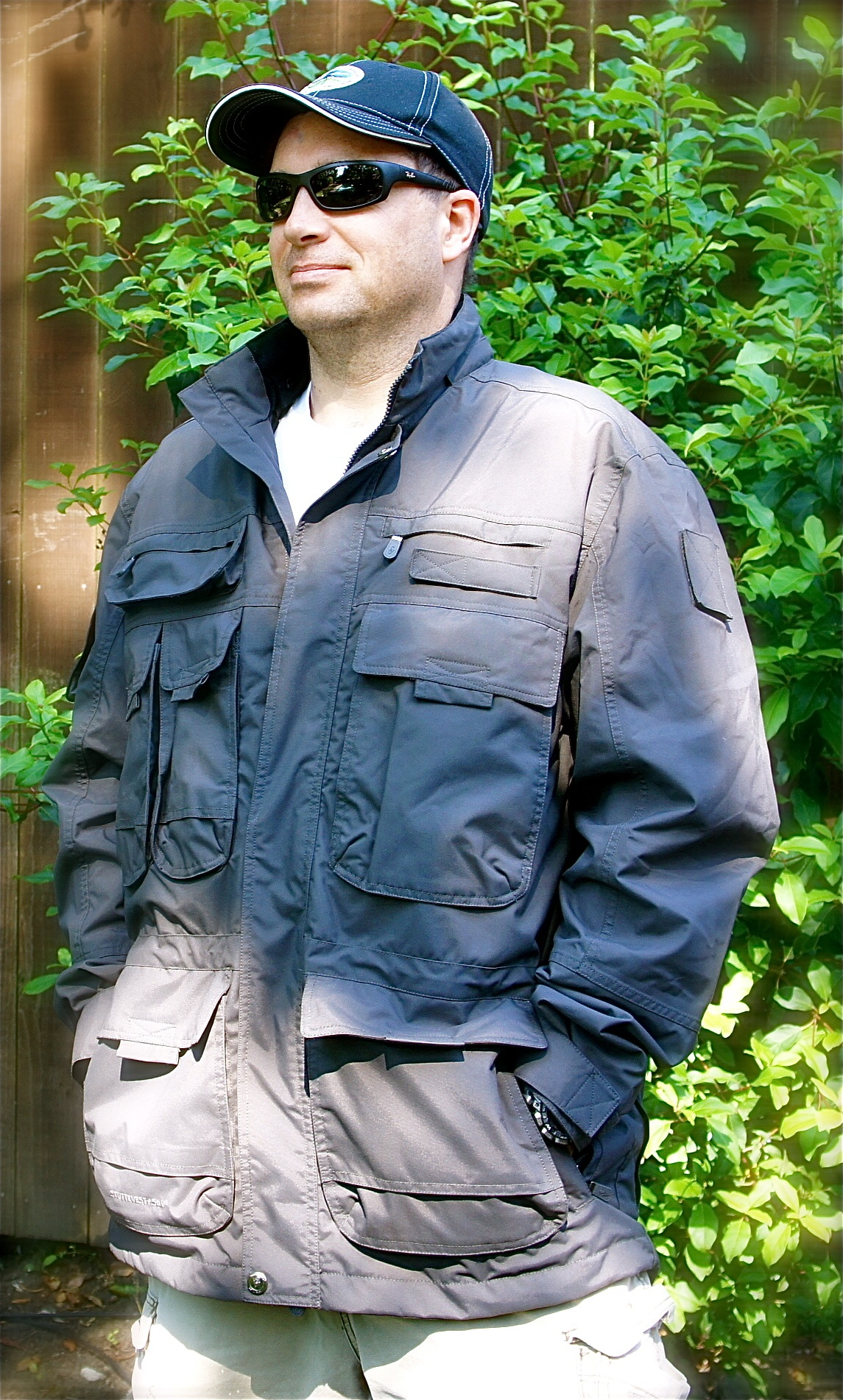
Man wearing a SeV Expedition Scottevest coat, 2011

Described by Jordan as travel clothing "that doesn't look like travel clothing," Scottevest coats and jackets are deliberately designed to circumnavigate baggage allowance weight and space restrictions by enabling wearers to stash the usual contents of their carry-on bag in up to 42 specially designed pockets. The designs are engineered to distribute the weight of the loaded pockets evenly across the garment, maintaining a slim, non-bulky silhouette. In addition to the jackets and outerwear, more unusual products include boxer shorts with a pocket for a smartphone.

One signature design feature is incorporated channels for threading wires and flexes, inspired by an accident Jordan had after snagging the cable of his headphones on a door-handle while running through an airport. Other designs incorporate flexible, detachable solar panels (made using CIGS on a stainless steel substrate), intended to be used to charge gadgets. Scottevest were the first to offer a wearable battery for recharging Google Glass, incorporated into a shirt.

== Media ==
On March 2, 2012, Jordan represented Scottevest on Episode 30 of the ABC Show, Shark Tank, where he chose not to accept investment offers of up to $1 million.

Jordan's autobiography, Pocket Man: The Unauthorized Autobiography of a Passionate, Personal Promoter was published on 30 October 2014.

In late January 2018 Jordan posted comments on social media that stated that the company advertised on Fox News because viewers were "gullible" and "idiots." Following negative coverage in the media, the comments and the social media accounts were deleted and an apology issued. The company swiftly distanced itself from their former CEO (who had stepped down in 2017), describing his comments as "impulsive and inappropriate." However, in March 2019, Jordan resumed his role as CEO of SCOTTeVEST.
