= TriGeo Network Security =

- Type: Private
- Industry: Technology (software)
- Founded: 2001
- Fate: Acquired by SolarWinds
- Headquarters: Post Falls, Idaho, USA
- Number of locations: 1
- Key people: Michelle Dickman, CEO, Michael Maloof, CTO
- Products: Security Information Manager (SIM)
- Website: www.trigeo.com

TriGeo Network Security was a United States–based provider of security information and event management (SIEM) technology. The company provided network security services to mid-market organizations with its SIEM appliance that provides real-time log management and automated network defense.

TriGeo’s appliance-based solution combines security event management, security information management and log management and intelligence into a single device.

== History ==
The company’s first major commercial product release, TriGeo Security Information Manager (SIM), debuted in January 2002 to help users automatically identify, notify and respond to suspicious behavior, policy violations, and network attacks.

TriGeo later introduced its 64-bit SIM appliance and started providing real-time analysis for network infrastructure devices such as deep packet inspection firewalls, intrusion detection and intrusion prevention data.

In July 2011, the company was acquired by SolarWinds, a developer and marketer of network, applications and storage management software.

== Focus ==
TriGeo SIM was sold exclusively to mid-market organizations and primarily targets banks, credit unions, retailers, government agencies, utilities, education, media and entertainment companies, and healthcare providers. The company also offered several add-on features which support additional functionality and security.

Once an unauthorized or suspicious activity is identified, Security Information Manager (SIM) notifies the user. Also, the technology can be configured to automatically respond by blocking an IP address, routing traffic, quarantining a workstation from the rest of the network or controlling applications and access control services based on user-defined rules. TriGeo SIM also has reporting capabilities for Sarbanes–Oxley, the Health Insurance Portability and Accountability Act (HIPAA), Gramm-Leach-Bliley Act (GLBA) and the Payment Card Industry Data Security Standards (PCI DSS).

The product was later sold as the SolarWinds Log & Event Manager and then renamed SolarWinds Security Event Manager.

== Industry Acronyms ==
- LMI – Log Management and Intelligence
- SEM – Security Event Management
- SIM – Security Information Management
