= The National Energy Services Company =

Energy company in Saudi Arabia

The National Energy Services Company (NESCO) - Tarshid
- Company type: Government Company
- Founded: Oct 2017 in Riyadh, Saudi Arabia
- Key people: Abdulaziz bin Salman Al Saud (Chairman); Waled Alghreri (CEO)
- Services: Energy; Energy Services; Energy Efficiency
- Owner: Public Investment Fund
- Number of employees: 40 (2018)
- Website: http://www.tarshid.com.sa/

The National Energy Services Company (NESCO), branded as Tarshid, is an energy company that was established in March 2017 in the Kingdom of Saudi Arabia.

Tarshid was issued a Saudi Royal Decree in March 2017, giving it the exclusive mandate to retrofit all public buildings and facilities in the Kingdom Tarshid is set to support the development of a commercial energy services market by building the capacity of local Energy Services Companies (ESCOs) and facilitating the establishment of the world's leading ESCOs in the Kingdom through collaborating with key stakeholders such as the Saudi Ministry of Finance (MOF) and the Saudi Energy Efficiency Center (SEEC).

Tarshid is fully owned by Public Investment Fund and has set targets for implementing energy efficiency projects in buildings and facilities across the Kingdom.
