= Earth Point =

Idaho real estate listings mapping system

EarthPoint.us maps the United States Public Land Survey System onto Google Earth.

== Features ==
- Township and Range - maps the United States Public Land Survey System onto Google Earth.
- Excel To Kml - map spreadsheet data onto Google Earth.
- Topo Map - displays USGS topo map on Google Earth.
- Coordinate Grids - maps UTM, MGRS, What3Words, Google Plus Code grids onto Google Earth.
- County Lines - displays USA county lines on Google Earth.
