= Press-A-Print =

American printing business

Press-A-Print International LLC
- Company type: Private
- Industry: Specialty Advertising
- Founded: 1986
- Headquarters: Las Vegas, Nevada, USA
- Area served: United States, Canada, Mexico
- Products: Business Opportunity, Pad Printer, Screen Printer, Vinyl Cutter, Heat Press
- Number of employees: 44 (2010)
- Website: pressaprint.com

Press-A-Print International LLC is an American business that sells a business opportunity in the specialty printing industry. With over 3,500 Owner/Operators, Press-A-Print is the largest group of independent specialty printers/distributors.

Press-A-Print's investment programs offer a complete business platform, consisting of a range of equipment, supplies, training and services for creating, managing and growing a specialty printing business. In addition to providing equipment for specialty printers and promotional product distributors, Press-A-Print offers a range of entrepreneurial services, including lifetime technical and business support services, marketing services, supply-chain management, and purchasing and outsourcing programs.

== See also ==
- Pad printing
- Promotional merchandise
