= Reel Theatres =

Cinema chain in the USA

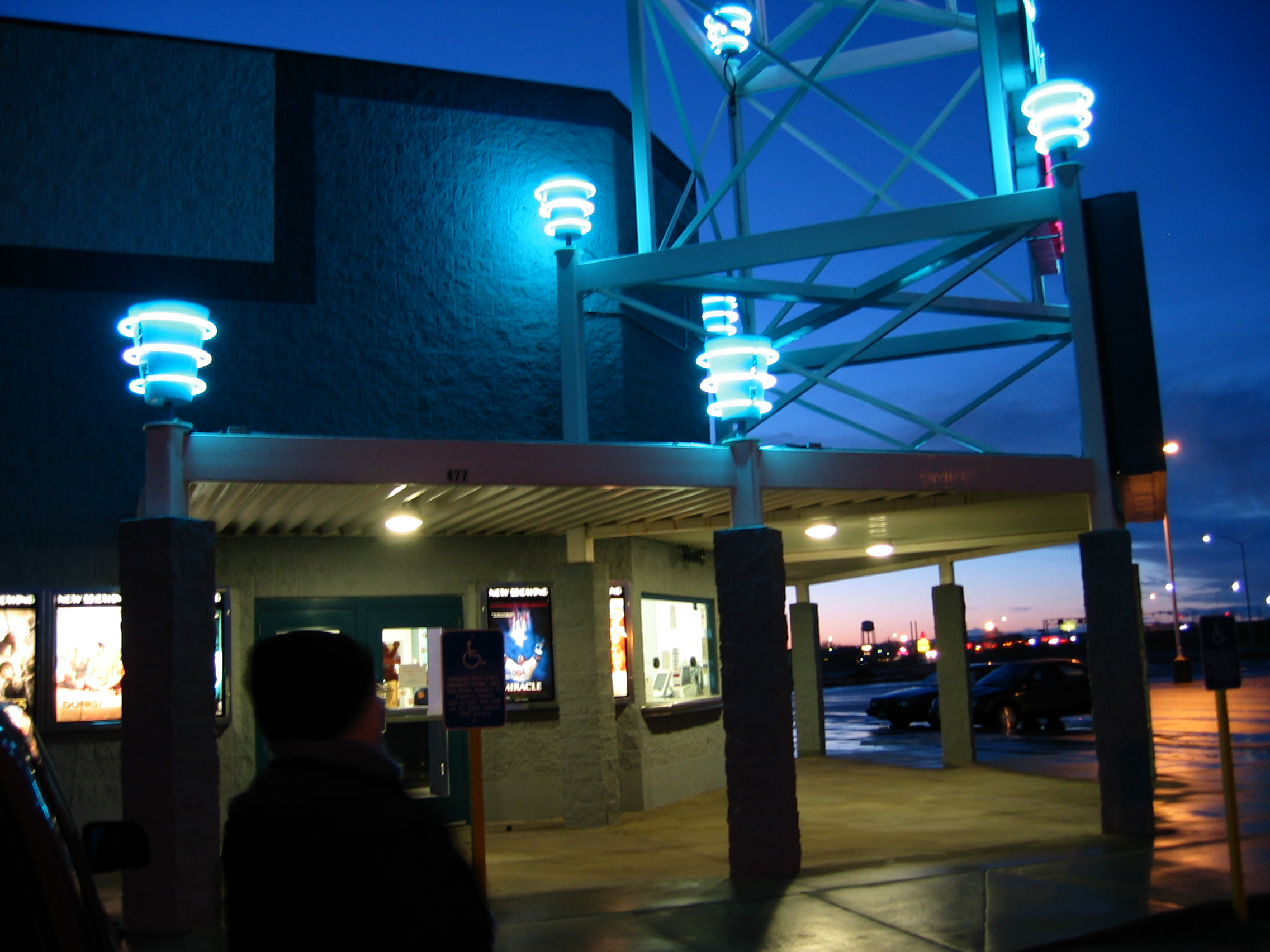
Reel Theatre 8, 13th St. Ontario, Oregon.

Reel Theatres is a movie theater chain in the United States owned by Casper Management—an Idaho corporation—that features independent and foreign films. It operates theaters in Idaho, Oregon and Utah.

== Locations ==
Idaho Theaters:

- Eagle
  - Eagle Luxe Reel
- Caldwell
  - Caldwell Luxe Reel
- Pocatello
  - Pocatello Reel

Oregon Theater:

- Ontario
  - Ontario Luxe Reel

Utah Theater:

- Richfield
  - Richfield Reel

== See also ==
- List of movie theaters and cinema chains
