= FIDO Friendly =

American dog magazine

FIDO Friendly, is an American dog travel and lifestyle magazine. It releases twice a month and covers themes such as hotel and location reviews, health and wellbeing, dog training tips, celebrity interviews, and the current fashion trends.

FIDO Friendly is also co-operatively involved with over 30 non-profit organizations, including North Shore Animal League America.
