= Native American Services Corp. =

Native American Services Corp (NASCO)
- Type: Private
- Industry: Construction Management, Facilities
- Founded: 1998
- Founder: Dennis "Rusty" Sheppard
- Headquarters: Kellogg, Idaho
- Key people: Dennis G. Sheppard - Chairman; Rick L. Luna - President & CEO; Jennifer Oertli - COO
- Number of employees: 125
- Website: www.nascousa.com

Native American Services Corp. is a TSB, HUBzone certified company, located in Northern Idaho's Silver Valley. The company was founded in 1998 by Dennis "Rusty" Sheppard and branded as Environmental Indian Construction (EIC), which focused on environmental remediation type projects. In 2002, CEO Matthew D. James purchased controlling interest in the small company and changed the name from EIC to Native American Services Corp (NASCO). NASCO is a Design Build, CM/GC company that primarily performs commercial and industrial construction in approximately 30 states nationwide, and internationally. NASCO specializes in Job Order Contracting (JOC) for various Governmental agencies including all branches of the U.S. Military, the Department of Defense (DOD), Homeland Security, Center for Disease Control (CDC), as well as several other Governmental agencies. In December 2012 NASCO purchased a 49% ownership interest in DWG & Associates Inc. (a Utah Corporation). In January 2016 NASCO completed a stock buy back, of all of James' outstanding stock shares, and Rick L. Luna was named president and CEO in May of that year. Also in 2016, NASCO formed NASCO Energy International (NEI), A United Kingdome (UK) corporation, as it procured energy based contracts internationally. In 2016 NASCO began leveraging its Job Order Contract (JOC) expertise gained in its dealings with the Federal Government, and began procuring JOC awards at several universities around the United States. In 2017 Nasco incorporated Nasco Safe Productions in an effort to provide quality control (QC) and Safety support for Small Businesses, and others in the Federal and Constriction disciplines. Additionally in 2017, NASCO formed NASCO Industrial Services and Supply (NISS) to perform Construction Services, and Industrial Supply for global mining organizations.

== Key partnerships ==
NASCO spent many years building relationships, and through the help and guidance of the Small Business Administration, entered the Mentor Protégé program, and formed what would be known as "The NASCENT Group J.V" which helped NASCO compete for contract vehicles previously not available to a small company. It would also help their partner corporation The Shaw Group (Shaw Beneco), benefit from the "Set Aside" contracts reserved for Native American and Disadvantaged Businesses with the United States Government. In 2004, The NASCENT Group J.V. was awarded the largest contract in the State of Utah, for the design build project of the new Blaine Section Headquarters for the United States Department of Homeland Security at Blaine, Washington. The NASCENT GROUP J.V. is 51% owned by NASCO and 49% owned by Shaw Beneco inc. The NASCENT group currently handles the work on the JOC (Job Order Contract) at Fort Gordon, SABER (Simplified Acquisition of Base Engineering Requirements) at Seymour Johnson AFB and Holloman AFB and IDIQ (Indefinite Delivery, Indefinite Quantity) Contracts at Fort Leonard Wood.

In 2007, it was announced that NASCO would be starting a new Joint Venture with Washington Group International to go after more contracts across the United States. The New Joint Venture is called NASCO/Washington Group J.V.

In 2014 Nasco was approved by the SBA as the Mentor, under the Mentor Protégé Joint Venture Program (MPJV), with Mirador Enterprises Inc. out of El Paso Texas. Under this Joint Venture, the team was awarded multiple contracts including the Front Range Saber (Colorado), BIA MATOC (New Mexico), Black Hills MATOC (S. Dakota), and the Ft. Bragg MATOC (N. Carolina), and Fort Benning MATOC (Georgia), to name a few.

In 2017 Nasco entered into an MPJV with Mevacon LLC. out of Las Cruces, NM under which the JV was awarded the JOC contract at Fort Hood (now Fort Hood), Texas.

== Major contracts ==
In 2003 NASCO was awarded a their first Indefinite-delivery-indefinite-quantity (IDIQ) contract at Fort Gordon, Georgia. Also in that year, they won a five-year MATOC contract with the U.S. Army Corps of Engineers which included building the United States Border Patrol station in Blaine, Washington which is also currently the headquarters of the Blaine Section of the United States Department of Homeland Security

NASCO currently has, or has completed contracts at Seymour Johnson Air Force Base (North Carolina), Holloman Air Force Base (New Mexico), Fort Leonard Wood (Missouri), Indiana MATOC, Anniston JOC (Alabama), Florida SATOC (Jacksonville), Compec II SABER (Nationwide), as well as several other Government, private construction, and University jobs nationwide.

== Awards ==
NASCO has been the recipient of several major awards, including the US Small Business Administration's "Administrators Award for Excellence."

In 2006, 4 years after buying controlling interest in NASCO, Matthew D. James was awarded the Idaho Minority Business Person of the year.

In 2008, the US Department of Homeland Security awarded NASCO with a Small Business Excellence Award for its services at the Federal law Enforcement Training Centet (FLETC) in Glynco, Georgia. Also in 2008 the Idaho SBA named NASCO the SBA 8a "graduate of the year" for the state of Idaho.

== Key locations ==
- NASCO Corporate – Kellogg, Idaho
- NASCO Southwest – Rio Rancho, New Mexico
- NASCO East Coast – La Plata, Maryland
- NASCO Southeast – Jacksonville, Florida
- NASCO Nevada – Winnemucca, Nevada

== NASCO divisions ==
- Fort Hood
- Fort Gordon
- Holloman Air Force Base
- Marine Corps Base Quantico
- Seymour Johnson Air Force Base
