= Preco =

Preco Electronics Inc
- Company type: Private
- Industry: Vehicle Safety and Object Detection Systems
- Founded: 1947
- Headquarters: Boise, Idaho, United States
- Products: PreView Radar Systems
- Website: www.preco.com

Preco Electronics Inc is a multinational vendor of radar-based object detection systems headquartered in Boise, Idaho, United States.

Preco was founded in 1947 by Edwin R. Peterson as a rebuilder of electronic water pumps, generators, and batteries and introduced the first reverse-motion alarm in 1967.

== Current products ==
PreView is a solid-state, pulsed-radar object detect system engineered to alert vehicle operators of both moving and stationary obstacles. The system can also be combined with automatic braking systems to stop vehicles when an obstacle is near. PreView is designed to work in extreme environmental conditions.

== Industry associations ==
- National Waste & Recycling Association
- Technology and Maintenance Council (American Trucking Associations)
- SWANA (Solid Waste Association of North America)
- National Association of Fleet Administrators
- Executive member of Association of Building Contractors
- SME (Society for Mining, Metallurgy and Exploration)
