= Outreach Calling Inc =

For-profit fundraiser

- Type: For-profit fundraiser
- Headquarters: New Jersey
- Methods: Professional fundraisers, telemarketing
- Official language: English
- CEO: Frank Delvmine
- Website: outreachcalling.com
- Formerly called: All-Pro Telemarketing Associates

Outreach Calling Inc is a for-profit fundraiser headquartered in New Jersey, incorporated in 2009. It has offices in the United States and Canada, with a virtual office in Reno, Nevada. The firm's telemarketers solicit funds on behalf of not-for-profit charities. The firm's telemarketers raise funds on behalf of charitable nonprofit organizations.

The firm's chief executive officer, Frank Delvmine, is also the CEO of a fundraising consulting company named Myers-Squibler and he has been permanently prohibited from using third-party fundraisers or fundraising in the state of New York.

According to filings from the Federal Election Commission filings, Outreach Calling retained $2 million from the Put Vets First! PAC which represents 89 percent of the $2.3 million in donations the Put Vets First! has received. Put Vets First! PAC was shut down in July 2019.

== Background ==
In 1989, Frank Delvmine launched All-Pro Telemarketing Associates in New Jersey.

== Contracts ==
Their standard contract gives Outreach Calling up to 90% of donations. In 2012 they raised $21,332,659. Of that $20,227,761 was retained by their clients. In July 2017 the Saint Louis, Missouri Better Business Bureau (BBB) published a caution to consumers in their decision to donate to Hampton's Center. BBB reported that only 1% of all donations collected by the Center for American Homeless Veterans' two main fundraisers actually go to the Center for American Homeless Veterans. Furthermore, the BBB reported that over a two-year period from 2014 to 2016 the two major fundraisers used by the center, Reno, Nevada-based Outreach Calling and Phoenix, Arizona-based Midwest Publishing, had collected almost US$5 million. Of that amount approximately $508,000 was retained by the Center for American Homeless Veterans and almost all of that was used to "pay salaries, legal fees and office-related expenses." One person who was scammed into donating to the for-profit fundraiser noticed that her bank account "...showed that the check had been cashed, but there was no name as to who got the [money]. No one endorsed it. There was no name shown on the account, just an account number and routing number."

== Charities that use Outreach Calling Inc ==
In December 2017 the Center for Public Integrity listed charities in Utah assigned an F rating in Utah by CharityWatch: Center for American Homeless Veterans; Childhood Leukemia Foundation, Defeat Diabetes Foundation, Healing Heroes Network, International Union of Police Associations, Kids Wish Network, Law Enforcement Officers Relief Fund, National Vietnam Veterans Foundation, Reserve Police Officers Association, The Committee for Missing Children, and United Cancer Support Foundation.

Their charity clients include American Alliance For Disabled Veterans, Inc., American Association For Cancer Support, Inc., American Foundation For Disabled Children, Inc., AMVETS (American Veterans), Cancer Fund Of America, Inc., Center For American Homeless Veterans, Inc., Child Watch of North America, Childhood Leukemia Foundation, Inc., Committee for Missing Children, Inc., The Defeat Diabetes Disabled Police Officers Counseling Center, Inc., Disabled Police Officers Of an International Union of Police Associations, AFL-CIO (contract since 2010 through Megan Parker), Law Enforcement Officers Relief Fund National Vietnam Veterans Foundation, Inc., Optimal Medical Foundation, Inc., Reserve Police Officers Association, United Breast Cancer Research Society, Inc., Veterans Assistance Foundation, Inc., and Woman To Woman Breast Cancer Foundation, Inc.

== Breast Cancer Survivors Foundation (BCSF) ==
As part of New York Attorney General's "Operation Bottomfeeder" Breast Cancer Survivors Foundation, Inc., (BCSF) was shut down in June 2017. AG Eric Schneiderman explained that "too often these shell charities exploit popular causes to enrich professional fundraisers. I'm committed to using the full power of my office to stop those who take advantage of people's generosity to make a quick buck." In a June 16, 2017 press release, he "announced a settlement with the Breast Cancer Survivors Foundation, Inc., ("BCSF"), and its president and founder Dr. Yulius Poplyansky. For years, BCSF and its fundraisers painted the picture of an organization that was providing medical services to breast cancer patients and those at risk of breast cancer. Instead, as the Attorney General's investigation found, BCSF was a shell charity created and run by its primary outside fundraiser, Frank Delvmine, in order to line the pockets of Frank Delvmine, his companies, and his business associates – who pocketed 92 cents of every dollar donated to BCSF. As part of the settlement, BCSF will shut down its operations nationwide and pay nearly $350,000, which will be directed to legitimate breast cancer organizations."

In June 2017 NBC 5 Responds reported that more than 90 percent of the money donated to the Breast Cancer Survivors Foundation (BCSF) "was funneled to Frank Delvmine, its outside fundraiser, as well as Frank Delvmine other companies and business associates." The New York Attorney General Eric Schneiderman called the BCSF a big "sham." Dr. Yulius Poplyansky, the president and founder of Breast Cancer Survivors Foundation (BCSF) said, "I now understand that I had no idea what was going on in my own foundation and that my desire to help people was taken advantage of by people that just wanted to make money off this very serious cause."

== Circle of Friends for American Veterans (COFAV) ==
In 2007 Brian Arthur Hampton, the co-founder of a 501(c)(3) nonprofit charity, Circle of Friends for American Veterans (COFAV), hired Outreach Calling. (also known as "American Homeless Veterans") which was co-founded in 1993 in Falls Church, Virginia by Brian Arthur Hampton as a 501(c)(3) nonprofit charity. It is a non-profit advocacy organization that supports" veterans. . He also founded "American Homeless Veterans" and the Center for American Homeless Veterans—also known as the "Association for Homeless and Disabled Veterans".

=== Reviews ===
COFAV received an F rating from CharityWatch in 2016, a consumer warning from the Saint Louis, MissouriBetter Business Bureau (BBB) in July 2017 and was the subject of a Center for Public Integrity (CPI) report in December 2017. COFAV contracts with professional fundraisers who work through telemarketers such as Midwest Publishing, and until 2014, Company Civic Development Group (CDG). In July 2017 the Saint Louis, Missouri Better Business Bureau (BBB) published a caution to consumers in their decision to donate to Hampton's Center. BBB reported that only 10% of all donations collected by the Center for American Homeless Veterans' two main fundraisers actually go to the Center for American Homeless Veterans. Furthermore, the BBB reported that over a two-year period from 2014 to 2016 the two major fundraisers used by the center, Reno, Nevada-based Outreach Calling and Phoenix, Arizona-based Midwest Publishing, had collected almost US$5 million. Of that amount approximately $508,000 was retained by the Center for American Homeless Veterans and almost all of that was used to "pay salaries, legal fees and office-related expenses."

In 2016, CharityWatch gave COFAV an F assessment on a scale of A+ to F as it did not meet transparency or governance standards, for example the COFAC had fewer than five voting members. As well, for the fiscal year ending on September 30, 2015, only 11% of their calculated total expenses (c. $1,600,000) were spent on programs with 89% spent on overhead. During the same period, of the c. $1,500,000 of calculated total contributions it cost $89 in fundraising, to raise $100 in contributions.

In a 2014 article in which telemarketing company Civic Development Group (CDG) was ordered to pay "$18.8 million, the largest penalty ever handed down in a consumer protection case" by the Federal Trade Commission (FTC), COFAV, Paralyzed Veterans Association, and Disabled Veterans Association were listed on the F rated charities for which CDG fundraised.

== Reserve Police Officers Association Outreach ==
Reserve Police Officers Association Outreach. Operation False Charity, which "includes local and national enforcement actions and outreach initiatives" to police "those who claim to be raising money for cops, firefighters and veterans but aren't being honest...calling them at lawless "badge charities." Washington "state officials joined the Federal Trade Commission, state enforcement agencies and AARP Washington in announcing a nationwide crackdown on fraudulent charitable solicitors claiming to help police, firefighters and veterans." "Community Support, Inc., solicits funds from consumers in nearly every state on behalf of more than 35 charities. The states accused the company of suggesting more money would go to the charity or be spent locally, that its callers were law enforcement officers or veterans and that individuals had made pledges. The company was also blamed for making harassing calls. According to records at the Washington Secretary of State's Office, Community Support returned 12 percent of its total contributions to charity clients in 2008. Community Support did not admit any wrongdoing but agreed to pay $200,000 to the states to cover the costs of the investigation and lawsuit; Washington's share is $8,000. The settlement requires penalties if the company fails to comply with the terms. Washington's version of the settlement and complaint will be filed in King County Superior Court."

== Regulatory bodies ==
Operation False Charity, which "includes local and national enforcement actions and outreach initiatives" to police "those who claim to be raising money for cops, firefighters and veterans but aren't being honest...calling them at lawless "badge charities." Washington "state officials joined the Federal Trade Commission, state enforcement agencies and AARP Washington in announcing a nationwide crackdown on fraudulent charitable solicitors claiming to help police, firefighters and veterans."

In the November 12, 1998 "Operation Missed Giving" the FTC worked with the National Association of Attorneys General (NAAG), the National Association of State Charity Officials (NASCO), and the American Association of Retired Persons (AARP) with assistance from the National Sheriffs' Association, the BBB Wise Giving Alliance, and the Philanthropic Advisory Service of the Better Business Bureau. At that time it was soliciting for such nonprofit clients as the American Deputy Sheriffs' Association (ADSA), Foundation for Disabled Firefighters (FDF), National Association of Veteran Police Officers (NAVPO), Regular American Veterans (RAV), Handicapped Children's' Services of America (HCSA), and Adolescent Aids Foundation (AAF). The FTC did not "allege any wrongdoing on the part of these NACS'.

A Federal Trade Commission (FTC)/NASCO conference was held in March 21, 2017, targeting charity fraud, ranging from badge-related fraud 1997 in the "Operation Missed Giving" sweep to telemarketing. These agencies "routinely bring action against for profit fundraisers, as well as action against for profit fundraisers violating do not call provisions of the Telemarketing Sales Rule."

== Political fundraising ==
In a July 8, 2019 Center for Public Integrity article about ongoing investigations of Brian Arthur Hampton and his nonprofits, that he operated out of his Falls Church office, such as the Put Vets First! PAC (2010-)—investigative journalist Sarah Kleiner said that after Hampton "started contracting with Outreach Calling, a controversial telemarketer, in October 2015...the PAC started reporting significant contributions and expenses." According to the Center for Public Integrity, by January 2018, Outreach Calling Inc "which keeps most of the $$ it raises for its charity group clients, is expanding into the lightly regulated world of political fundraising." According to a January 5, 2018 article CPI investigative journalist which was based on Federal Election Commission and Internal Revenue Service documents, Hampton through Outreach had expanded his operations "into the largely unregulated world of political fundraising" by sponsoring a veterans-focused PAC political action committee that's using the same money-generating tactics as his nonprofit groups". According to Kleiner, it is legal for telemarketer Outreach Calling to keep 90 percent of the money it raises for charities and/or political action groups as long as the donors are told this will happen. Kleiner wrote that has contracted with Outreach Calling raised funds for about a dozen charities. New York regulators shut down two of these charities and scandals related to spending, surrounded other veterans' organizations, including the Wounded Warrior Project, scandals surrounding their spending. In July 2019, Hampton's Put Vets First! PAC filed a termination report with the Federal Election Commission.

Outreach Calling collected $2 million from the Put Vets First! PAC which represents 89 percent of the $2.3 million in donations the Put Vets First! has received, according to filings from the Federal Election Commission filings. More than $4.8 million was raised by Put Vets First! PAC over its lifetime. According to the Federal Election Commission disclosures, "[t]elemarketers kept $4.4 million of that, and Hampton earned about $183,500....Most of the rest went to pay the PAC's other employees and consultants, bank and legal fees and rent."

== See also ==
- Charity Navigator
- Charity assessment
- GuideStar
- GiveWell
