= Veteran =

Former military personnel

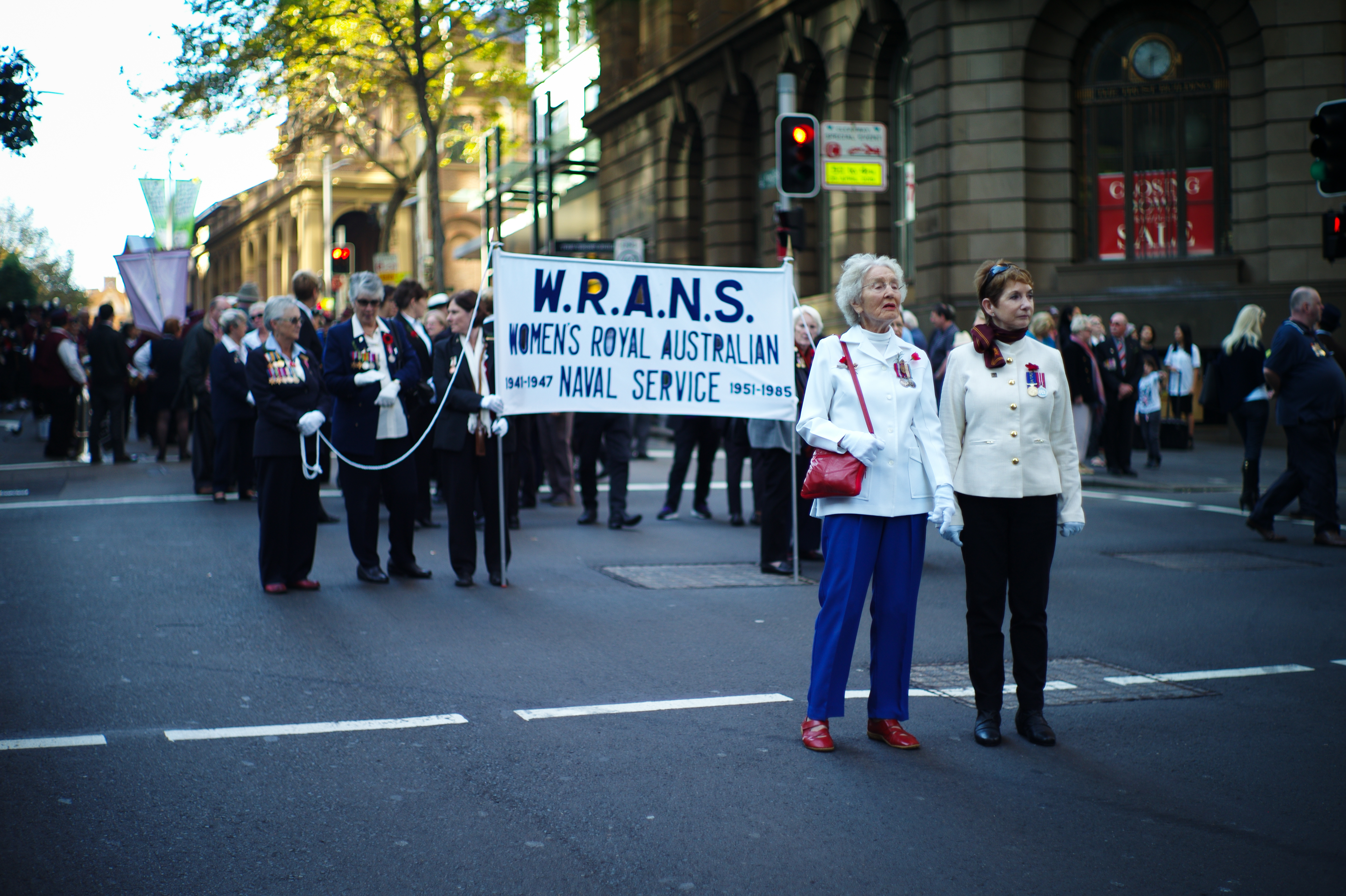
Women veterans who served with the Women's Royal Australian Naval Service during an Anzac Day parade, 2015

A veteran or ex-service is a person who is no longer serving in the armed forces.

A topic of interest for researchers has been the health of military personnel after leaving the military, particularly those who served in combat areas. This concern stems from veterans in countries like the US and Australia, being disproportionately over-represented in psychological and substance abuse disorders relative to the general population. In Australia, the Department of Veterans' Affairs provides a proactive service to address 'real life' health care problems in the veteran community.

== Public attitude towards veterans ==
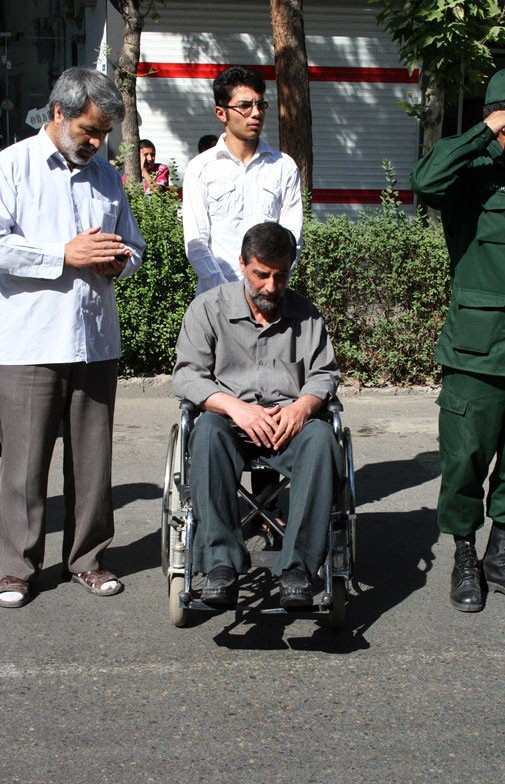
An Iranian veteran of the Iran–Iraq War attends the funeral of a comrade in Nishapur.

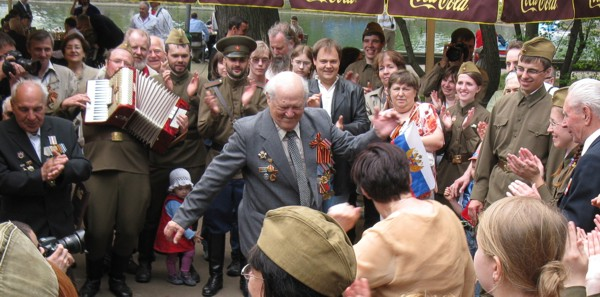
A Russian veteran of World War II dances at a Victory Day celebration in Gorky Park, Moscow (2009).

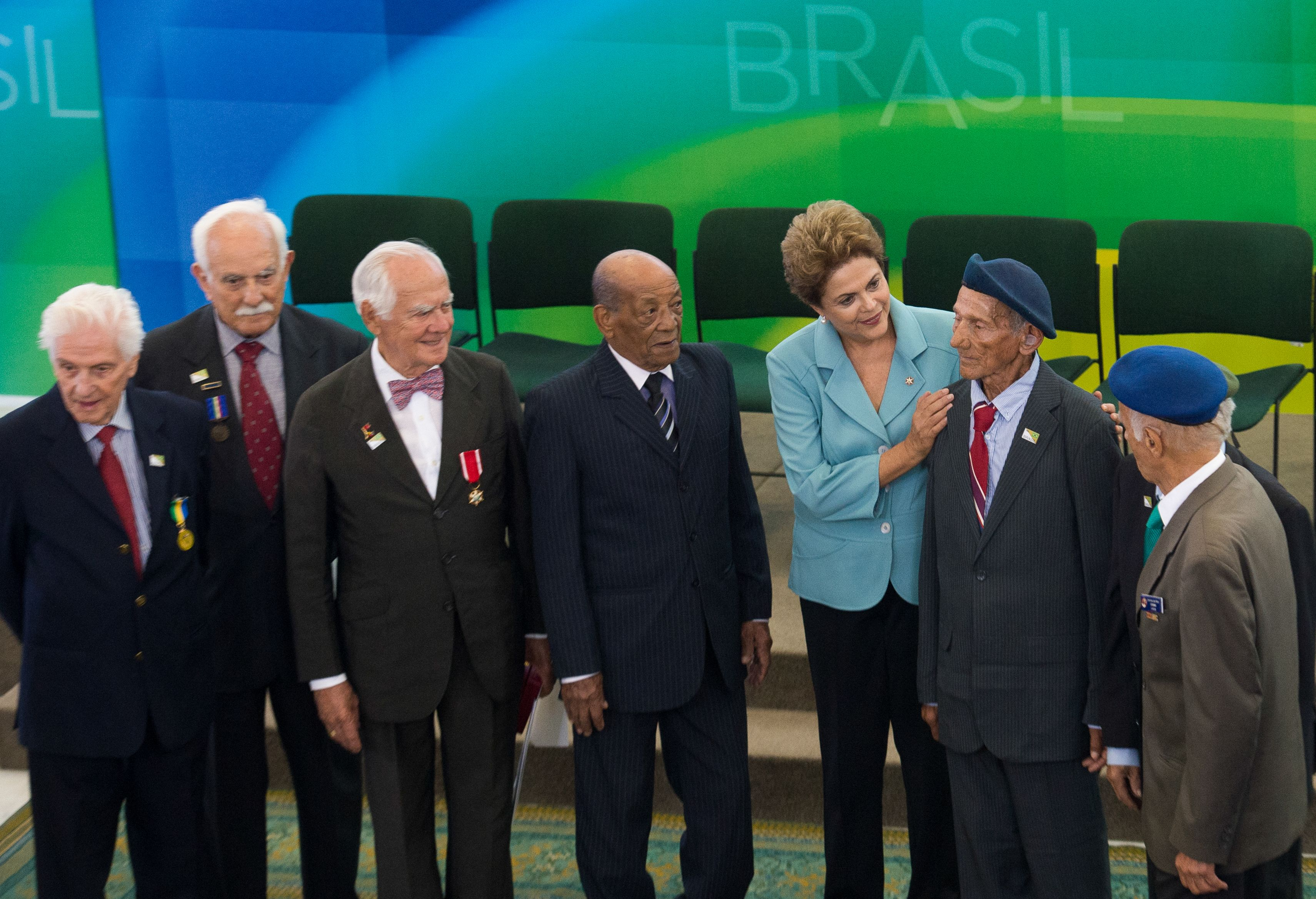
Brazilian president Dilma Rousseff with veterans of the Brazilian Expeditionary Force during a ceremony to commemorate the 70th anniversary of the end of World War II, 8 May 2015

Military veterans often receive special treatment in their respective countries. War veterans are generally treated with great respect and honour, although negative feelings towards veterans may be held in certain situations: veterans of unpopular or lost conflicts may be discriminated against. In some countries (e.g., Germany after 1945), veterans are neither honoured in any special way by the general public, nor have their dedicated Veterans Day, although events are sometimes orchestrated by minority groups.

The way veterans are portrayed in the media is likely to contribute to public attitudes. A small scale survey in 2020 indicated several ways in which veterans themselves feel that their representation in the media could be improved, by avoiding certain stereotypes.

Many countries have longstanding traditions, ceremonies, and holidays to honour their veterans. In Commonwealth member states, Remembrance Day is held on November the 11th and is focused mostly on the veterans who died in service. A red or white Poppy is worn on the lapel (for remembrance or for peace, respectively) in the weeks up to the date, and wreaths and flowers laid at memorials to the dead.

In Russia, a tradition was established after World War II where newly married couples would on their wedding day visit a military cemetery. In France, for instance, those wounded in war are given the first claim on any seat on public transit. Most countries have a holiday such as Veterans Day to honour their veterans, along with the war dead.

In Zimbabwe, the term veteran is used for political purpose and may not actually refer to someone that participated in a war, but rather to someone who feels entitled to some benefit because of association with a cause for which there had been an actual war.

== Veterans' experiences around the world ==
=== Congo-Kinshasa ===
Some veterans from the Belgian commitment of the Congolese to World War II live in communities throughout the Congo. Though they received compensation from the government during the rule of the dictator Mobutu Sese Seko, after his overthrow they no longer receive pensions.

=== United Kingdom ===
Ex-service is British terminology for veterans, which refers to those who have served in the British Empire or Commonwealth Armed Forces.

Britain, with its historic distrust of standing armies, did little for its veterans before the 19th century. It did set up two small hospitals for them in the 1680s. In London and other cities the streets teemed with disabled or disfigured veterans begging for alms.

The First World War focused national attention on veterans, especially those who had been partly or wholly disabled. The King's National Roll Scheme (KNRS) was an employment program for disabled veterans of the First World War. Kowalsky says it was practical, innovative, and ahead of its time and was the most important piece of legislation enacted for disabled veterans in interwar Britain. In addition to direct aid, it stimulated a national discussion regarding the need for employment programs for disabled veterans and the responsibility of the state, setting up a future demand for more benefits.

In the 21st century, Britain has one of the highest densities of veterans in a major country, with 13 million in 2000, or 219 per 1,000 population.

=== United States ===
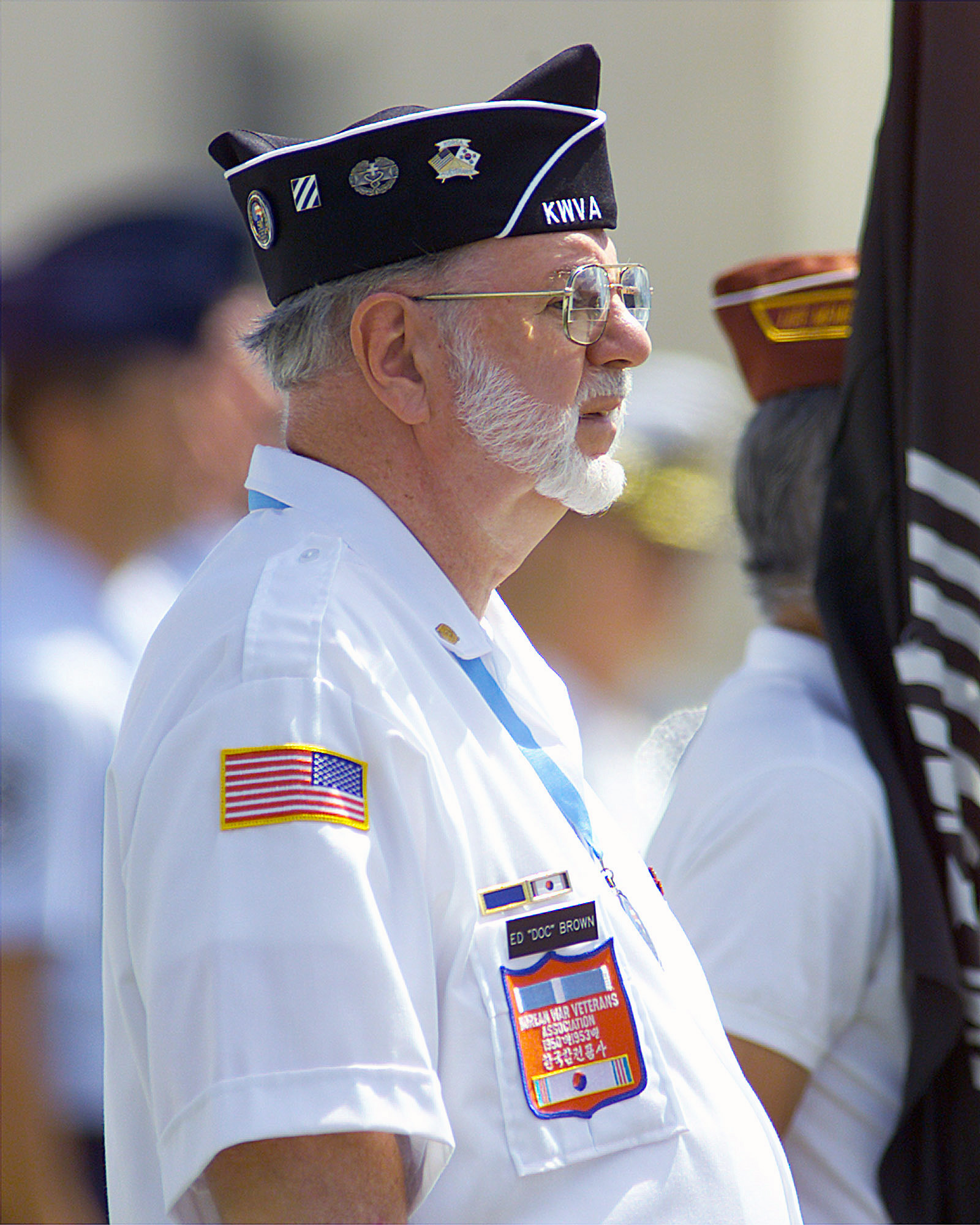
A Korean War veteran at Hickam Air Force Base, Hawaii, in July 2001

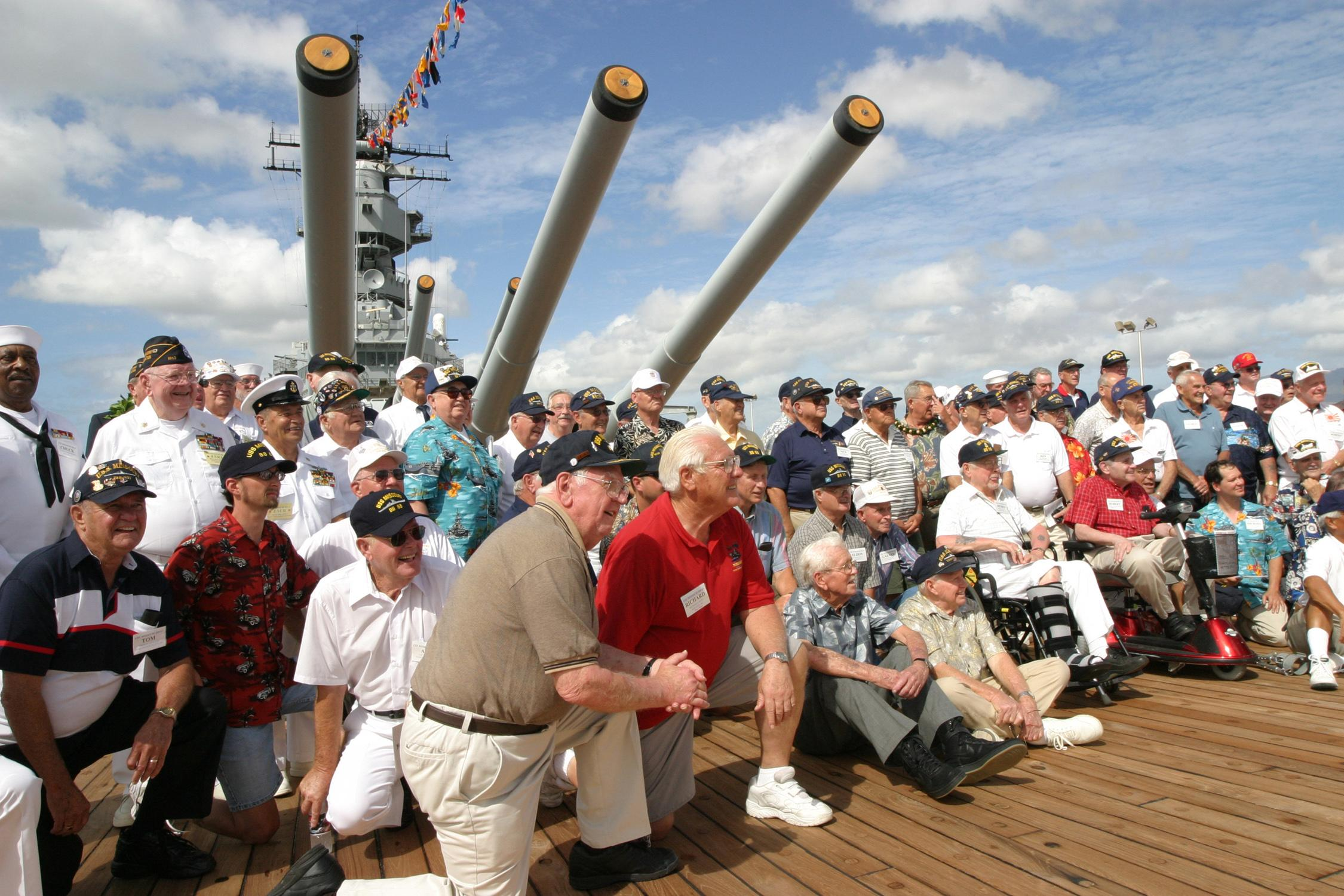
Veterans who served on the battleship Missouri, pictured here shortly after a ceremony marking the anniversary of the end of World War II

In the United States, a veteran is a person who has served in the armed forces (including the Reserve and certain members of the United States National Guard) and was discharged under conditions other than dishonorable. A common misconception is that only those who have served in combat or those who have retired from active duty can be called military veterans.

In 1990, 40% of young Americans had a veteran for a parent; this decreased to 16% in 2014. In 2016, of the veterans who were born outside of the United States, Mexican and Filipino Americans made up the two largest populations, with 3% of all veterans having been born outside of the United States. As of 2017 there are some 21 million American veterans.

According to the Pew Research Center, "Among men, only 4% of millennials [born 1981-96] are veterans, compared with 47%" of men in their 70s and 80s, "many of whom came of age during the Korean War and its aftermath."

==== Veterans' benefits in the United States ====
President Abraham Lincoln, in his second inaugural address in 1865 towards the end of the American Civil War, famously called for good treatment of veterans: "[T]o care for him who shall have borne the battle, and for his widow, and his orphan". The American Civil War produced veterans' organizations, such as the Grand Army of the Republic and United Confederate Veterans. The treatment of veterans changed after the First World War. In the years following, discontented veterans became a source of instability. They could quickly organize, had links to the army and often had arms themselves. The Bonus Army of unemployed veterans was one of the most important protest movements of the Great Depression, marching on Washington, D.C. to get a claimed bonus now that Congress had promised them decades in the future.

Each state of the United States sets specific criteria for state-specific veterans' benefits. For federal medical benefits from the Department of Veterans Affairs (VA) hospitals, prior to 7 September 1980 the veteran must have served at least 180 days of active duty, after the above-mentioned date the veteran must have served at least 24 months. However, if the veteran was medically discharged and receives a VA service-connected disability stipend, the time limits are not applicable.

==== American veteran experience after World War II ====
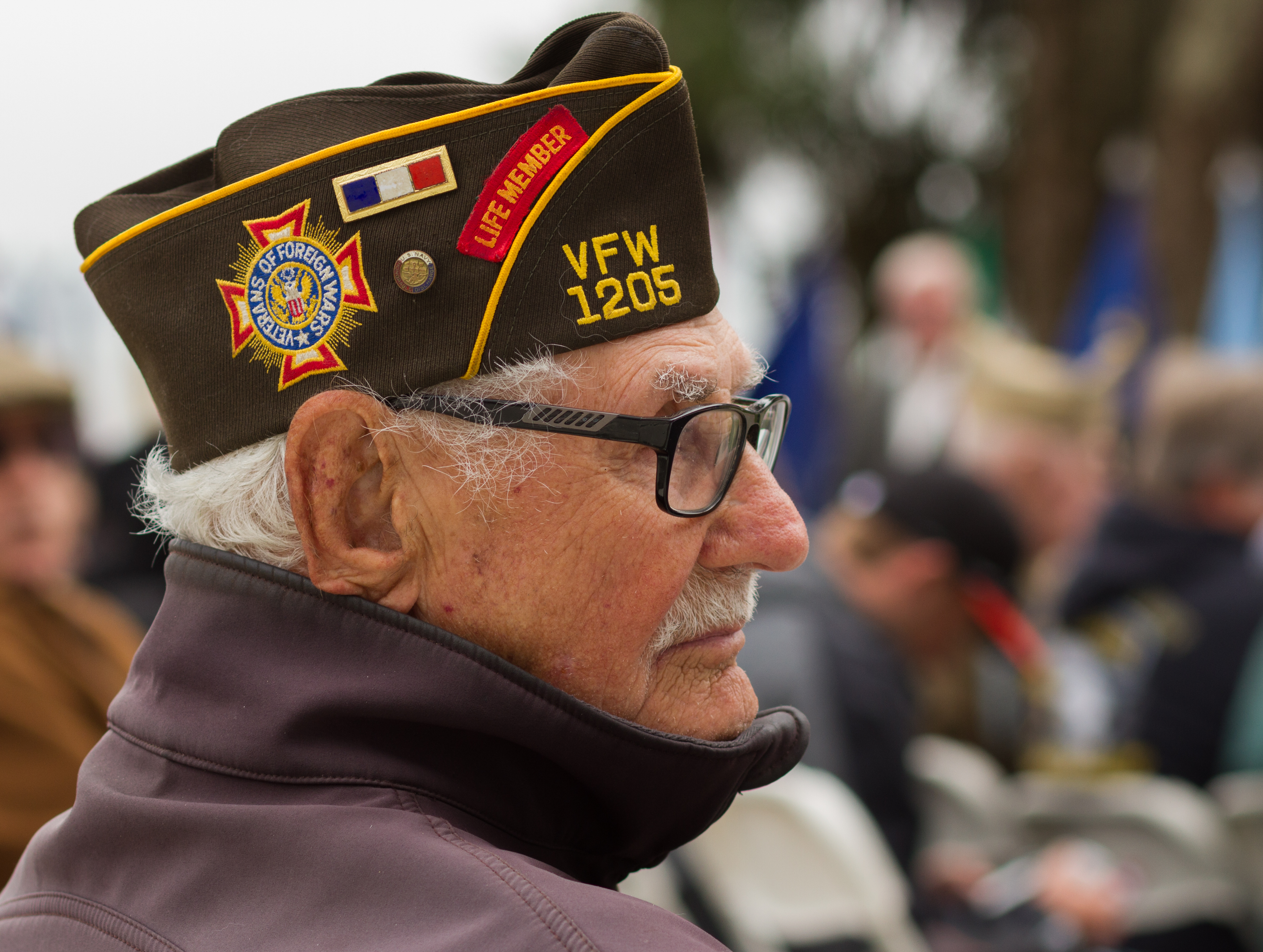
World War II veteran on Memorial Day 2013 at San Francisco National Cemetery

After the Second World War, in part due to the experience of the First World War, most of the participating states set up elaborate veterans' administrations. Within the United States, it was veterans groups, like the American Legion and Veterans of Foreign Wars organization, that pushed for and got the G.I. Bill enacted. These gave veterans access to free or subsidized education and health care. The newly educated GIs created a significant economic impact, and with the aid of VA loans were able to buy housing and establish themselves as part of a growing American middle class. The explosion of the suburbs created sufficient housing for veterans and their families.

==== American veteran experience after OEF and OIF ====
Many veterans of Operation Enduring Freedom and Operation Iraqi Freedom have had to face challenges unique to warfare in the 21st century. One significant difference between OEF and OIF and previous wars is a greater dependence on reservists and repeat deployments. Up to 80% of troops deployed at the beginning of OEF were part of the National Guard and Reserve and about 40% of currently serving military members have been deployed more than once. This has meant that many deployed troops, not being as "steeped in military culture" have had more difficult transitions into military life, and for many the increased redeployment rate has meant more transitions, more uncertainty, longer terms, and shorter dwell times, all of which contribute to greater stress.

Due to medical advances, warfare in the 21st century tends to yield more survivors with severe injuries which soldiers in previous wars would have died from. This means that, though fewer service members die, more return from war with injuries more serious, and in turn more emotionally devastating, than ever before. Among these injuries is the increasingly common traumatic brain injury, or TBI, the effects of which can range from a mild concussion to amnesia and serious neurological damage.

==== Female veterans in the U.S. ====
Women have served in the United States military for over two hundred years. Some female veterans perceive themselves as discriminated against by their male counterparts and, as such, women who have served in the armed forces have sometimes been known as "the invisible veterans". Women were not fully recognized as veterans until after WWII, and prior to this they were not eligible for VA benefits. The current percentage of U.S. Veterans who are women is more than 8 percent. Women make up nearly 11.6 percent of OEF/OIF/OND Veterans. A tri-state (Washington, Idaho, Oregon) women veterans conference in Pendleton, Oregon, in April 2008, attracted 362 women veterans, according to the East Oregonian newspaper. A growing number of states are recognizing June 12 as Women Veterans Day, either through proclamation or legislative action.

On August 5, 2011, Erica Borggren was appointed Director of the Illinois Department of Veterans Affairs and has been "creating a new Women Veterans Program to help address the issue that women veterans often do not self-identify as veterans and do not take advantage of veterans' benefits to the same extent as their male peers." She gathered in a webcast panel moderated by Stacey Baca with Dr. Rebecca J. Hannagan and Kimberly Mitchell at the Pritzker Military Library on January 24, 2013, to discuss important issues facing female veterans in today's military.

==== African American veterans in the U.S. ====
African Americans have participated in every war fought by or within the United States. Black veterans from World War I experienced racial persecution on returning to the U.S. from overseas, particularly in Southern cities. Black veterans from World War II continued to be denied equality at home despite President Harry S. Truman's desegregation of the military after World War II. Black veterans went on to play a central role in the civil rights movement of the 1950s and 1960s. The National Association for Black Veterans is an organization that provides advocacy and support for African American and other minority veterans.

== Health effects of military service and treatment for veterans ==
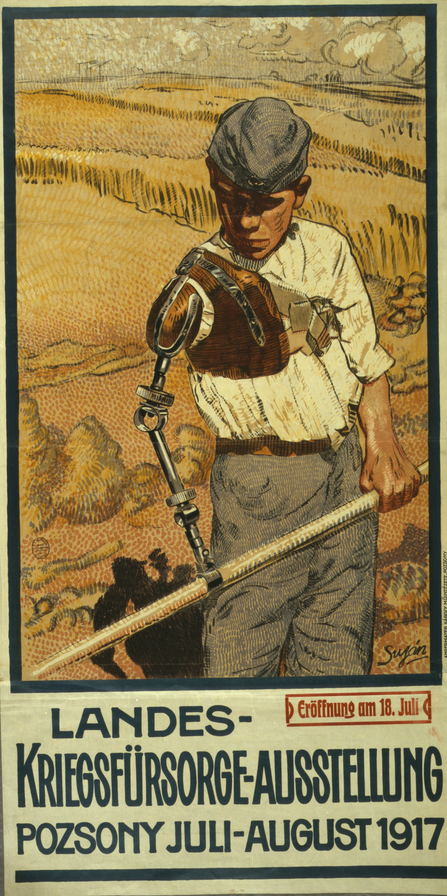
Austrian World War I propaganda poster for an exhibition on veteran support, depicting a wounded in action veteran with a prosthetic.

The effect of active military service can be profound and lasting, and some veterans have found it difficult to adjust to normal life again. Figures from 2009 showed that twice as many veterans were in prison than there were British troops currently in Afghanistan. Homelessness, street-sleeping and relationship breakdown are also commonly reported. Research done by the UK homelessness charity CRISIS (1994) and the Ex-Services Action Group (1997) both found that a quarter of homeless people had previously served in the armed forces. The Times newspaper reported on 25 September 2009 that in England and Wales the number of "military veterans in jail has more than doubled in six years". Another Times article of the same date quoted the veterans mental health charity Combat Stress as reporting a 53% increase in referrals from doctors.

=== Suicide ===
==== Risks ====
In Australia, Canada, the U.K., and the U.S., military veterans of all ages carry a substantially elevated suicide risk relative to the general population, particularly younger veterans.

In Canada, Denmark, the U.K., and the U.S., deployment to a war zone (unless in a combat role) has not been associated with an increased risk of suicide. A study of the U.S. army found that the career stage carrying the greatest risk was initial military training.

Research in several countries has found that the personnel most at risk include those who: had a troubled childhood; are of low rank; have close-combat roles in war; and/or leave service soon after joining. Other risk factors common to military life include depression, posttraumatic stress disorder, alcohol misuse, bullying and sexual harassment.

==== Examples ====
An article in the London Metro on 28 January 2010, 'Veterans prone to suicide', cited a report by the Mental Health Foundation saying that more needed to be done to care for UK veterans of the Afghanistan War. Many had "plunged into alcohol problems, crime and suicide" upon their return.

In the U.S., the suicide rate among veterans is 300% the national average. They account for 30% of the suicides in the US annually.

According to a 2015 report by the Japanese Ministry of Defense, 56 Japan Self Defense Force members had committed suicide after serving in overseas missions to Iraq and the Indian Ocean. Defense officials stated that 14 deaths were due to mental illness, 13 to family or financial problems and three to official duties.

=== Post-traumatic stress disorder ===
Posttraumatic Stress Disorder (PTSD) is a condition that affects a significant number of veterans. Studies involving veterans with combat-related PTSD indicate that between 4-17% of United States veterans have been diagnosed with PTSD. Their United Kingdom counterparts, however, have significantly lower numbers of just 3-6%.

New treatment programs are emerging to assist veterans suffering from post-combat mental health problems such as depression and PTSD. Cognitive behavioral therapy (CBT), is becoming an important method for the treatment of mental health issues among veterans, and is currently considered the standard of care for depression and PTSD by the United States Department of Defense. CBT is a psychotherapeutic approach that aims to change the patterns of thinking or behavior that responsible for patient's negative emotions and in doing so change the way they feel. It has been proven to be an effective treatment for PTSD among war veterans. Recently, online programs that pair CBT with therapist interaction have also proven effective in treating mental health problems among veterans. Eye Movement Desensitization and Reprocessing (EMDR) is also an effective and noninvasive, drug-free treatment for PTSD, although it has not been tested against specific military traumatic exposure for efficacy.

Veterans under the age of 25 are at higher risk for PTSD than veterans older than 25. Younger veterans with severe PTSD are at higher risk for metabolic syndrome and suicide.

Music therapy provides veterans with a way to express themselves, escape from anxiety, and helps them cope with their PTSD. In Mike Lawson "Music and Science Meet…Music Therapy", Lawson explains "Modern music therapy became a norm in the Veteran's Administration hospitals during and after both World Wars. In its most basic form the playing of recordings on the Victrola in WW I, hospitals had measurable positive effects on the wounded and shell-shocked patients. This began the use of a somewhat primitive music therapy in all American military hospitals."

=== Other disorders ===
Veterans are at higher risk than the general population for several disorders, especially younger veterans (those younger than 25). Younger veterans are at increased risk for substance use disorders, including alcohol use disorder, and mental illnesses in general.

=== Help for veterans ===
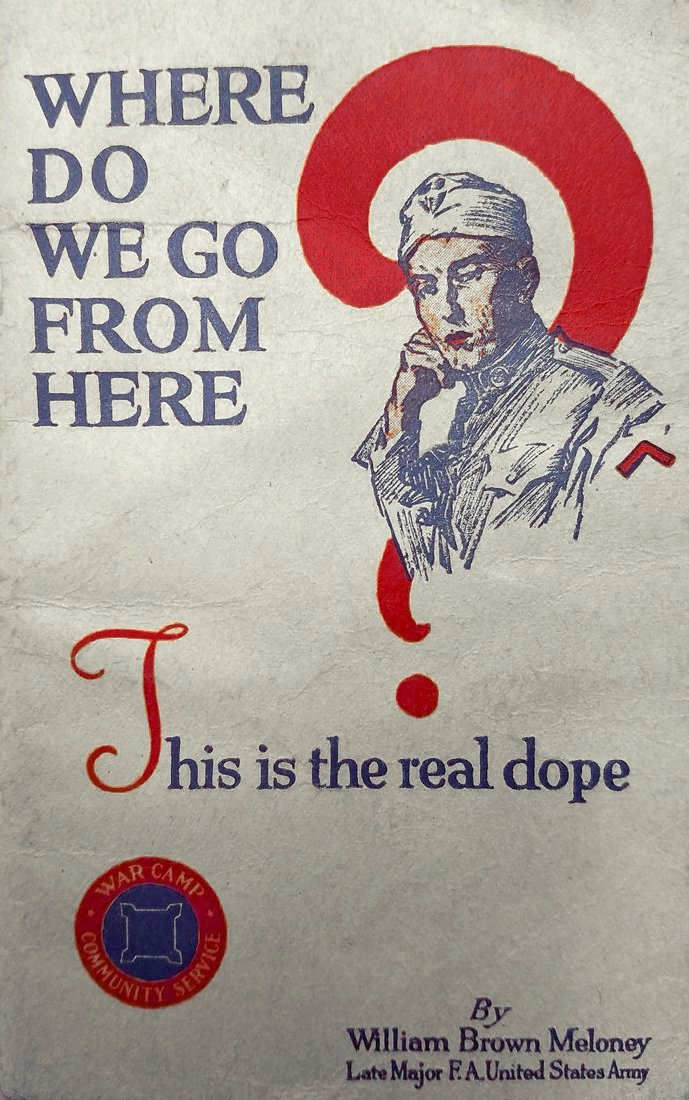
Book given to U.S. veterans in 1919 to help them readjust to civilian life

Necessity has resulted in a number of sources of help being made available for veterans. Many of these are independent, charitable organisations, and in some countries the aftercare and rehabilitation services provided by Governments have been inadequate. This may be because they do not wish to give attention to the negative effects of military service and the difficulties of readjustment to civilian life for it may have an adverse impact upon recruitment for their armed forces. Nevertheless, help is available and veterans should feel able to make contact and ask for assistance or advice to the broad network of organizations, and to appropriate legislators, without feeling that this is a weakness. Military service can be a profoundly unnatural experience and it is likely that some help may be needed in debriefing and rehabilitation into the community, whether it be medical, psychological, practical or financial. There were an estimated 57,849 homeless veterans in the United States during January 2013, accounting for 12 percent of all homeless adults. Just under 8 percent of homeless U.S. veterans are female.

== See also ==
- Demobilization
- List of veterans' organizations
- Veterans studies
