= William Buzenberg =

American journalist

William "Bill" Buzenberg
- Education: Kansas State University
- Occupation: Journalist
- Writing career
- Genres: News, nonprofit journalism
- Subjects: Investigative reporting, journalism
- Website: www.iwatchnews.org

William "Bill" Buzenberg is an American journalist and news executive. He is the former executive director of the Center for Public Integrity, a post from which he stepped down at the end of 2014.

== Education ==
Buzenberg is a graduate of Kansas State University. He is a former Peace Corps volunteer, and he has been awarded fellowships at the University of Michigan, Johns Hopkins University and Harvard University.

== Career ==
Buzenberg worked for National Public Radio from 1978 to 1997, serving as a foreign affairs correspondent and London bureau chief before becoming Vice President of News. At NPR, Buzenberg presided over the network's major expansion of breaking news coverage. He was also responsible for helping to launch Talk of the Nation as well as a network core schedule of midday news/talk programming that was broadly adopted by NPR affiliates across the country. From 1998 through 2006, Buzenberg was senior vice president of news at American Public Media and Minnesota Public Radio. Buzenberg became executive director of the Center for Public Integrity in January 2007. Buzenberg was co-editor of the memoirs of the late CBS News president Richard Salant. Buzenberg serves on the board of directors of the Institute for Nonprofit News. In 2014, Buzenberg was involved in a public spat with ABC News over credit for a Pulitzer prize. In 2015, Buzenberg undertook a Shorenstein Fellowship, writing about collaborative journalism.

== Awards and recognition ==
In October 2016, Buzenberg was one of 18 individuals selected to participate in a summit through the American Press Institute.
