= Global Integrity =

Nonprofit organization

Global Integrity was an independent, nonprofit organization tracking governance and corruption trends around the world using local teams of researchers and journalists to monitor openness and accountability. Global Integrity's reporting has been cited by over 50 newspapers worldwide, and is used by the World Bank, USAID, Millennium Challenge Corporation and other donor agencies to evaluate aid priorities. Global Integrity's methodology for metrics of governance and corruption differed from the Corruption Perceptions Index or Bribe Payers Index) because GI drew from local experts and transparent source data, rather than surveys of perceptions.

Global Integrity closed in 2023.

== Description ==
Global Integrity's analytical method is based on the concept of measuring the "opposite of corruption" – that is, the access that citizens and businesses have to a country's government, their ability to monitor its behavior, and their ability to seek redress and advocate for improved governance. The resulting data allows policymakers, private industry, non-governmental organizations and the general public to identify specific strengths and weaknesses in various countries' governmental institutions.

== History ==
Global Integrity began in June 1999 as a project of the Center for Public Integrity (a Washington, D.C. nonprofit investigative reporting organization) as an attempt to find a new way to investigate and assess corruption around the world and how governments address it. The project published a three-country pilot report in 2001. In August 2002 the Open Society Institute (a private philanthropic foundation) awarded the center a $1 million grant, which resulted in a 25-country study released in April 2004. In the summer of 2005, Global Integrity spun off from the center as a separate organization and formally incorporated as a non-profit corporation. In March 2006, it opened its Washington, D.C. office. In January 2007 Global Integrity released a 43-country study, and a 55-country study in January 2008. In 2007, Global Integrity was recognized by Ashoka: Innovators for the Public, a network of social entrepreneurs, with an award for innovation in fighting corruption. In 2008, Global Integrity won an award from the Every Human Has Rights campaign for reporting on censorship issues.
