= Susan Smith Richardson =

American journalist and editor

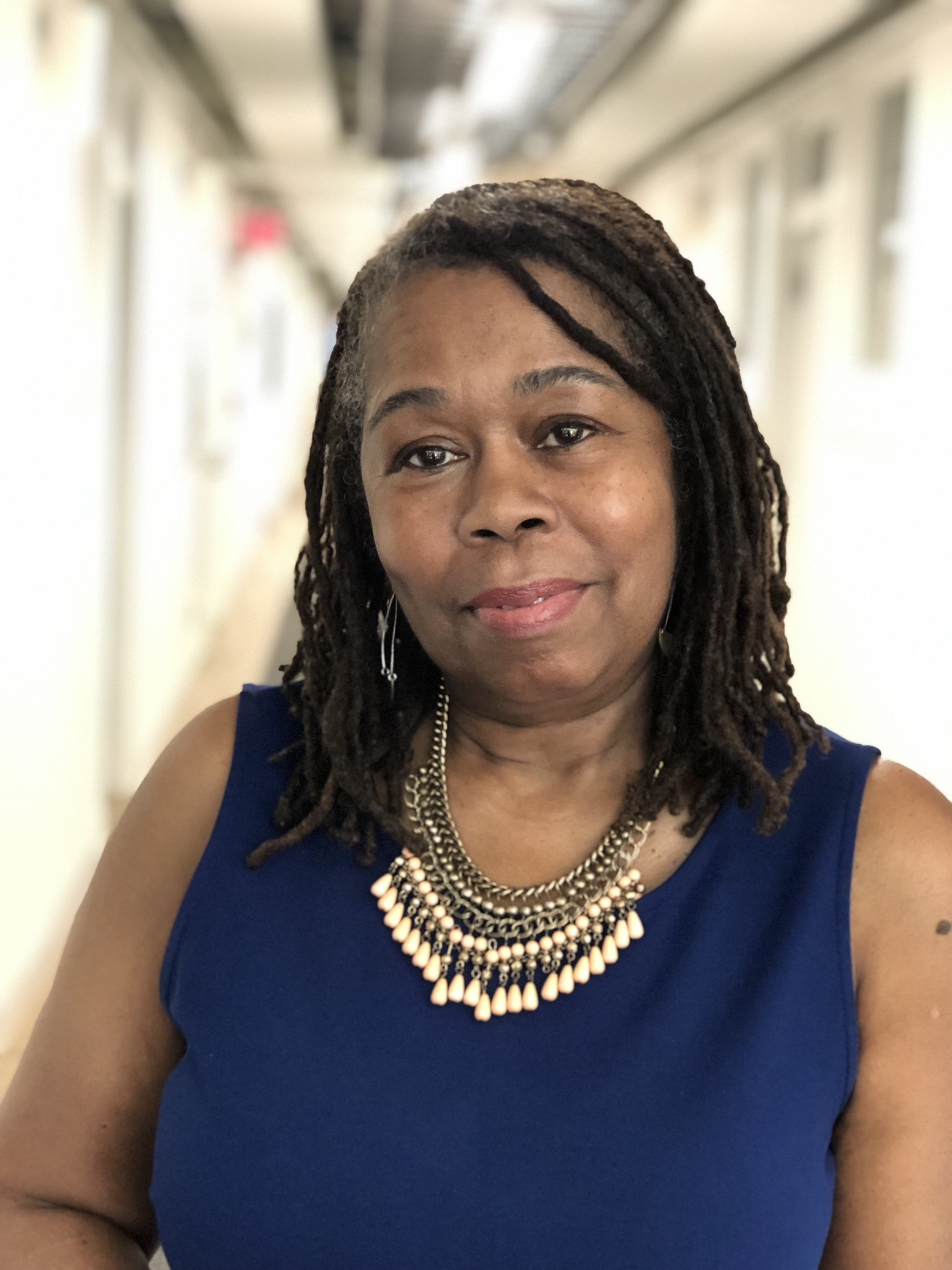
- Occupation: Journalist, editor

Susan Smith Richardson is an American journalist, news editor and media executive. She is the former managing editor at The Guardian US. Prior to that, she was the chief executive officer of the Center for Public Integrity in Washington, D.C. Until 2019, she was editorial director of newsrooms for the Solutions Journalism Network and was previously the editor and publisher of The Chicago Reporter. In 2002, she was awarded a Nieman Fellowship at Harvard University. From 2011 to 2013, she was editor of the Texas Observer magazine and from 2004 to 2007, she was an editor for the Chicago Tribune. She has served on the board of directors for the MOLLY National Journalism Prize, named after journalist Molly Ivins.

She was a research fellow at the Bernard and Audre Rapoport Center for Human Rights and Justice at the University of Texas School of Law, and directed the Frances T. "Sissy" Farenthold Archives Project.

She holds an M.P.A. from Harvard University's Kennedy School of Government and a bachelors of science in radio, television and film from the University of Texas at Austin.

In 2024, she joined The Intercept's board of directors.
