= Reynolds cancer charities =

The Reynolds cancer charities refer to the four "sham charities": the Cancer Fund of America, Inc. (CFA), Cancer Support Services Inc. (CSS), Children's Cancer Fund of America Inc. (CCFOA), and The Breast Cancer Society Inc. (BCS) that began operations in 1984 and were shut down in 2016. They were run by James T. Reynolds, James Reynold II, Kyle Effler, Rose Perkins, Kristina Reynolds and other Reynolds family members and friends. The Federal Trade Commission (FTC) described the Reynolds cancer charities as "one of the largest charity fraud cases ever." They were listed as among America's worst charities, based on high management costs, high salaries to directors, and low (1%–2.5%) proportion of income disbursed to beneficiaries. The investigation of the Reynolds' sham charities, initiated by the FTC and all fifty states plus the District of Columbia, resulted in "one of the largest actions brought to date [2015] by enforcers against charity fraud." The May 2015 historic civil suit alleged that CFA, CSS, CCFOA, and BCS had collected more than $187 million in donations from consumers and that a majority of the money went to "the perpetrators, their families and friends," and for-profit fundraisers contracted by the charities. Reynolds' and associates contracted about ten of these for-profit solicitors who "earned more than 80 cents of every dollar donated" [to CFA] for a total of $80.4 million."

Reynolds created his first charity – the Cancer Fund of America – in 1984 after he was dismissed from his job at the respected organization, the American Cancer Society (ACS), following accusations of theft and poor record keeping.

CCFOA, BCS, CFA and CSS were dissolved and James Reynolds Sr., Rose Perkins, Kyle Effler, James Reynolds Jr. and his wife, Kristina Reynolds "were banned from any future charitable fund raising." James Reynolds Sr. surrendered some of his personal assets. Very little money from the charities was recovered and no one involved faced any jail time.

== History ==
Jim Reynolds Sr. was described by the Times/CIR report as a "a former Army medic with no college degree who worked his way up to lead the Knox County, Tenn., chapter of the prestigious American Cancer Society." He was dismissed from the ACS Knox County, Tennessee, office, following accusations of "taking title to a 1968 Mustang donated for an auction", "sloppy record-keeping", "sloppy bookkeeping" and "irregular hours."

In response, in 1984, Reynolds created his first cancer charity, called the "Cancer Fund of America" (CFA). The name was similar to the ACS, his rented mail drop was similar to the ACS's Atlanta address and his volunteers did their "door-to-door soliciting donations" during the ACS "fund drive".

In 1989, a dozen states sued Cancer Fund of America along with other charities with a fine of $2.1 million for "running sweepstakes that promised winners thousands of dollars but handed out checks for pennies." In 1989, Reynolds said he planned on ending his contracts with the "direct mail campaigns," but instead they hired more for-profit fundraisers. By 2012, the Reynolds' network had contracts with ten for-profit fundraisers.

When CFA was cited for misleading donors by 5 states from 1992 to 2007, Reynolds blamed the professional for-profit fundraisers. He was able to pay fines and keep on with his operation.

From 2003 to 2013 "tens of thousands of people" had donated "nearly $100 million" to the Tennessee-based Cancer Fund of America. The CFA claimed that it provided "direct financial aid" to cancer patients and their families.

Early in the 2000s, the Reynolds' family began to "spin off" five new similar cancer charities with "similar missions" paying "executive salaries to nearly a dozen relatives". In 2007 alone, "his son, step-son, sister-in-law and son-in-law each made more than $75,000."

In 2011 alone the salaries for the Reynolds network of cancer charities, drew over $8 million, which represented "3 times more than patients received in cash". Of that, almost a million went to Reynolds family members.

Breast Cancer Society (BCS)

James Reynold II (James Reynolds Jr.) was the director of BCS and his wife, Kristina Reynolds was the spokesperson. In 2008 he earned a combined salary of $262,000 in 2008 and $300,000 in 2011 for his full-time jobs in both the BCS and the CFA. In 2011 the BCS reported to the IRS that it had "shipped $36 million worth of medical supplies overseas." However, "the two companies named as suppliers of the donated goods said they have no record of dealing with the group."

Children's Cancer Fund of America (CCFA)

Rose Perkins, Reynolds' ex-wife, was CCFA director with a salary of $227,000 in 2013. CCFA was located in the Knoxville suburb of Powell, minutes away from the CFA.

Cancer Support Services (CSS)

In 2002, Rose Perkins, their son, James Reynolds Jr. and other CFA board members "transformed space in a telemarketer's phone room in Michigan into a brand new charity" called "Cancer Support Services". They hired the same telemarketers at $10 an hour and their managers, who had previously worked for a corporate telemarketer, to collect donations for Cancer Fund of America, "its sole beneficiary". They were not "required to file financial reports or get scripts approved by regulators. After paying expenses each year, Cancer Support Services has only 10 cents on the dollar left to ship to Cancer Fund." They were under investigation in 2013 after 11 years of operations. The Times/CIR called CSS a "boiler room operation" where "hundreds of callers solicit[ed] donations, then send the cash to Cancer Fund to make its fundraising costs look lower."

== Investigations ==
=== America's Worst Charities Times/CIR (2013) ===
In their joint 2013 report the Tampa Bay Times and the Center for Investigative Reporting (CIR) listed the Cancer Fund of America at number 2 on its list of America's Worst Charities, based on costs of soliciting donations over a ten-year period. James T. Reynolds, his family and friends ran the organizations called the Cancer Fund of America, Cancer Support Services, Children's Cancer Fund of America, the Breast Cancer Society and others. which have been identified as among America's worst, based on high management costs, high salaries to directors, and low (1%–2.5%) proportion of income disbursed to beneficiaries.

==== Professional fundraisers ====
The Times/CIR investigation identified "America's 50 worst charities based on the money they divert from the needy by paying professional solicitation companies." By 2013, about a dozen of these professional fundraisers had "multimillion dollar operations in Florida, Louisiana and Pennsylvania" that had "built networks of multiple charities, some with interlocking boards or family connections."

Reynolds contracted out fundraising to professional solicitors who retained over 50% to 80% of the donations they collected. "On average, the Reynolds charities that use professional solicitors pay them 77 percent of everything raised." In their first year, although the CFA had raised $7.7 million, less than 10 percent went to cancer patients. By 2013, the professional fundraising companies had "earned more than 80 cents of every dollar donated [to CFA] for a total of $80.4 million." Of the "hundreds of thousands of nonprofits that operate in the United States", "[o]nly about 6,000 charities hire for-profit fundraisers" according to the IRS. Only "a few hundred" rely on professional fundraisers "for the majority of their income". No "charity should spend more than 35 cents to raise a dollar."

Reynolds consistently blamed the for-profit fundraisers for the financial inefficiencies of his network. Following a lawsuit in 1989, Reynolds said he planned on ending his contracts with the for-profit professional fundraisers and their "direct mail campaigns". They hired more. By 2012, the Reynolds' network had contracts with ten for-profit fundraisers.

=== Better Business Bureau (2013) ===
The Better Business Bureau (BBB) warned in 2013 that cancer patients received only "pennies in the dollar" from the Breast Cancer Society.

=== Federal Trade Commission (2015) ===
The Federal Trade Commission (FTC) described the Big C charities as "sham charities". On March 30, 2016, the Federal Trade Commission announced the complete disbandment of the Cancer Fund of America and Cancer Support Services. Additionally, James Reynolds Sr. was barred from ever again operating or fundraising for non-profit organizations. The Federal Trade Commission (FTC) described the Reynolds cancer charities as "one of the largest charity fraud cases ever".

==== FCC & 50 States Civil suit (May 2015) ====
A civil suit was initiated by the Federal Trade Commission and all fifty states plus the District of Columbia in May 2015, claiming that "most of the money collected through donations from 2008 through 2012 went to pay the telemarketing companies, and the operators of the charities then kept most of the rest of the funds for themselves". The sham charities deceptively made their operations appear to be larger and more active through an "accounting device that involved pharmaceutical shipments overseas". The Federal Trade Commission described this as "one of the largest charity fraud cases ever". Reports include lavish spending on luxury goods, family trips to Disneyland and payment of college tuition fees, the beneficiaries being a group of individuals including Reynolds's close family and friends.

The federal court complaint named the "Cancer Fund of America, Inc. (CFA), Cancer Support Services Inc. (CSS), their president, James Reynolds, Sr., and their chief financial officer and CSS’s former president, Kyle Effler; Children’s Cancer Fund of America Inc. (CCFOA) and its president and executive director, Rose Perkins; and The Breast Cancer Society Inc. (BCS) and its executive director and former president, James Reynolds II."

At their 2016 annual conference on the theme of "The Evolving World of State Charities Regulation", the National Association of State Charity Officials (NASCO) and the National Assistant Attorneys General (NAAG) called attention to the "historic civil suit" by the "Federal Trade Commission (FTC) and regulators from all 50 states and the District of Columbia" against "four cancer charities in 2015". The FCC described the case as "one of the largest actions brought to date by enforcers against charity fraud."

By March 2016, in the settlement, both CFA and CSS were permanently dissolved. James Reynolds Sr. had to "surrender an unspecified portion of his personal assets and stay out of charity business for life. Any remaining assets from the charities, expected to be little or nothing, will first go to repay states’ litigation fees and after that to legitimate charities selected by the states."

"Under prior settlements, Children’s Cancer Fund of America and the Breast Cancer Society were dissolved, and the four employees – Rose Perkins, Kyle Effler, James Reynolds Jr. and Kristina Reynolds – were banned from any future charitable fund raising."
