= Circle of Friends for American Veterans =

Defunct American nonprofit organization

- Formation: 1993
- Founder: Brian Arthur Hampton
- Founded at: Falls Church, Virginia
- Type: 501(c)(3)
- Tax ID no.: 54-1847890
- Headquarters: Falls Church, Virginia 22046
- Location: 210 East Broad Street, Suite 202
- Methods: professional fundraisers, telemarketing
- Official language: English
- CEO: Brian A. Hampton
- Affiliations: Center for American Homeless Veterans (Association for Homeless and Disabled Veterans)
- Revenue: $1,499,809 (2015)
- Website: Circle of Friends for American Veterans

Circle of Friends for American Veterans (COFAV), also known as "American Homeless Veterans," was a 501(c)(3) organization that supported veterans and related causes. It was founded in 1993 in Falls Church, Virginia by Brian Arthur Hampton. The charity has faced criticism for allocating only about 10% of its income to charitable causes, with the remainder being paid to fundraisers.

COFAV partners with professional fundraisers who utilize paid telemarketers to solicit funds. This structure results in COFAV incurring costs of over half of every dollar donated. Of the remaining funds, a relatively high percentage goes toward executive salaries and deferred compensation. Charity watchdogs have unfavorably compared COFAV to its peers.

In 2020, COFAV was dissolved, and Hampton was fined $100,000 by the attorney general of Virginia.

== Charitable activities ==
=== Lobbying ===
Hampton said he had "hosted more than 100 members of Congress across 196 veterans shelter-themed forums in 46 cities" in rallies for these non-profits. In the summer of 2015 Lauren Baghsarian, from Stockton University's Washington Center program served as the Circle of Friends for American Veterans' Program Coordinator where she "research[ed] the many issues our country's veterans face while reintegrating into civilian life." [She] met with Legislative Assistants of Congress and Senate.

=== Direct financing to veterans ===
"Over the years" COFAV "has written modest checks for over 30 transitional facilities" for veterans who are "drug-free, alcohol-free, well-groomed and willing to work".

=== Political action ===
By 2015, Hampton had established a sponsoring a veterans-focused political action committee Put Vets First PAC DBA Association for American Veterans and hired Outreach Calling to do the fundraising. According to the Federal Election Commission (FEC), by 2018, the PAC had contributed $2000 in 2015 and $2000 in 2016. From January to September 2017, no PACs or politicians had received any funds from Hampton. However, Outreach Calling had raised $1.5 million for the PAC, keeping $1.3 million. Hampton paid himself $75,000 from the PAC.

== Related entities ==
The founder of COFAV, Brian A. Hampton, founded the Center for American Homeless Veterans, also known as the "Association for Homeless and Disabled Veterans", another 501(c)(4) charity operating from the same address. He founded Put Vets First, a PAC, also operating from the same address. In 2007 Hampton began contracting with the professional fundraiser Outreach Calling. Hampton publishes the Veterans' Vision.

COFAV and its related entities contracted with several professional fundraising organizations, including Outreach Calling, of Bloomfield, New Jersey, and Charitable Resource Foundation, Inc. of Greenwood, Indiana.

=== Outreach Calling ===
Outreach Calling Inc is a for-profit fundraiser which was incorporated in 2009. It is headquartered in New Jersey with offices in Canada and the United States including a virtual office in Reno, Nevada. The firm's telemarketers solicit funds on behalf of not-for-profit charities.

According to New York state regulators, "a wealthy 49-year-old New Jersey businessman", Mark Gelvan (b.1978), is the "driving force behind Outreach Calling." Outreach Calling collects money for "homeless veterans," "breast cancer survivors", "disabled police officers", and "children with leukemia", among others. According to a 2017 CPI analysis, "Outreach Calling, raised more than $118 million on behalf of about two dozen charities from 2011 to 2015", retaining $106 million. This left c. 10.3 percent or $12.2 million, for the non-profit charities and those they serve - homeless veterans, breast cancer survivors, disabled police officers, and children with leukemia. In the United States, it is legal for-profit telemarketers to keep 90% of the donations they solicit as long as they to not "mislead prospective donors" or "lie to them about how their contributions will be used", according to Jim Sheehan, "head of the charities bureau for the office of New York Attorney General Eric T. Schneiderman."

In 2012 they raised $21,332,659. Of that $2,227,761 was retained by the charities. In 2012, "Outreach Calling collected $6,681 on behalf of the Disabled Police and Sheriffs Foundation from Massachusetts residents ... and turned over $668 to the charity, according to state records."

Their standard contract gives Outreach Calling up to 90% of donations. In July 2017 the Saint Louis, Missouri Better Business Bureau (BBB) published a caution to consumers in their decision to donate to Hampton's Center. BBB reported that only 10% of all donations collected by the Center for American Homeless Veterans' two main fundraisers actually go to the Center for American Homeless Veterans.

== Controversy ==
In 2014, telemarketing company Civic Development Group (CDG) was required to pay "$18.8 million, the largest penalty ever imposed in a consumer protection case" by the Federal Trade Commission (FTC). COFAV was one of the F-rated charities for which CDG conducted fundraising.

=== CharityWatch ===
In 2016, CharityWatch gave COFAV an F assessment on a scale of A+ to F as it did not meet transparency or governance standards, for example the COFAC had fewer than five voting members. As well, for the fiscal year ending on September 30, 2015, only 11% of their calculated total expenses (c. $1,600,000) were spent on programs with 89% spent on overhead. During the same period, of the c. $1,500,000 of calculated total contributions it cost $89 in fundraising, to raise $100 in contributions.

=== Saint Louis Better Business Bureau (BBB) ===
In July 2017 the Saint Louis, Missouri Better Business Bureau (BBB) published a caution to consumers in their decision to donate to Hampton's Center. BBB reported that only 10% of all donations collected by the Center for American Homeless Veterans' two main fundraisers actually go to the Center for American Homeless Veterans. Furthermore, the BBB reported that over a two-year period from 2014 to 2016 the two major fundraisers used by the center, Reno, Nevada–based Outreach Calling and Phoenix, Arizona–based Midwest Publishing, had collected almost US$5 million. Of that amount approximately $508,000 was retained by the Center for American Homeless Veterans and almost all of that was used to "pay salaries, legal fees and office-related expenses."

=== Center for Public Integrity ===
In December 2017, Center for Public Integrity (CPI) journalist Sarah Kleiner published a report on Brian Arthur Hampton and his non-profit organizations including the Circle of Friends for American Veterans. Kleiner revealed that according to the 2015 Center for American Homeless Veterans' tax returns, "it provided just $200 in grants to other organizations out of $2.5 million in overall expenditures, the vast majority of which paid telemarketers." According to an October 24, 2018, article co-published by CPI, NBC News, Public Radio International (PRI) and the Buffalo News, a former Circle of Friends staffer, turned whistleblower, asked the "IRS to revoke not-for-profit status of the Circle of Friends for American Veterans and the Center for American Homeless Veterans" because "his former employer is bilking donors out of millions of dollars—money intended to help homeless veterans". In their October 4, 2018, response, the IRS noted that this could "take several years until final resolution of all tax matters." As of 24 October 2018, based on filings submitted by Put Vets First PAC to the Federal Election Commission Hampton "continues to raise significant sums of money." The October 24 article co-published by the CPI, NBC News, Public Radio International (PRI) and the Buffalo News said that, according to federal records, "Hampton spends almost all of the money on fundraising, wages for himself and others and overhead costs".

=== Charity Navigator ===
By January 2018, Charity Navigator, the "New Jersey–based philanthropy advocacy group placed 'concern advisories' on the Circle of Friends for American Veterans and the Center for American Homeless Veterans". "Charity Navigator holds that reputable charities should spend at least 75 percent of expenses on programs."

== Office of the Attorney General of Virginia (2020) ==
In March 2020, Brian Arthur Hampton's The Circle of Friends for American Veterans and the Center for American Homeless Veterans were shut down by the Office of the Attorney General of Virginia because of the veterans charities had "allegedly misused $13 million in donations."

== See also ==
- Charity fraud
