= Center for Public Integrity =

American investigative journalism nonprofit

The Center for Public Integrity
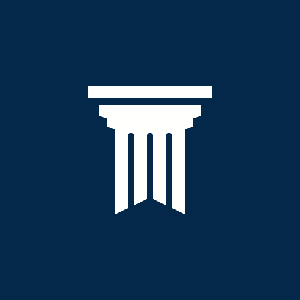
- Founded: March 30, 1989; 37 years ago
- Founder: Charles Lewis
- Defunct: March 31, 2025; 19 months ago
- Type: 501(c)(3)
- Tax ID no.: 54-1512177
- Purpose: Investigative journalism
- Location: Washington, D.C.
- Revenue: $3.83 million (2023)
- Endowment: $5.22 million (2023)
- Website: www.publicintegrity.org

The Center for Public Integrity (CPI) was an American nonprofit investigative journalism organization. CPI's stated mission was "to counter the corrosive effects of inequality by holding powerful interests accountable and equipping the public with knowledge to drive change." It won the 2014 Pulitzer Prize for Investigative Reporting, and in 2023, the Edward R. Murrow Award for General Excellence.

Mass layoffs in 2024 saw almost the entirety of CPI's workforce dismissed. In March 2025, CPI announced that it had officially ceased operations and was seeking to turn its archives over to the Project on Government Oversight.

== History ==
=== 1989–2004 ===
CPI was founded on March 30, 1989, by Charles Lewis, a former producer for ABC News and CBS News 60 Minutes. By the late 1980s Lewis observed that fewer resources—time, money and space—were being invested in investigative reporting in the United States by established news outlets and major publications. All three had grown dissatisfied with what was being done in the name of investigative journalism by established news organizations. They chose the name Public Integrity as a way of underscoring the "ultimate purpose of investigative journalism" which is "to hold those in power accountable and to inform the public about significant distortions of the truth."

In May 1990, Lewis used the money he had raised and his house as collateral to open an 1,800-square-foot (170 m^{2}) office in Washington, D.C. In its first year, the CPI's budget was $200,000. In 1996, CPI launched its first website, although CPI did not begin to publish reports online until 1999.

In August 2000 the CPI published a story entitled "Cheney Led Halliburton to Feast at Federal Trough: State Department Questioned Deal With Firm Linked to Russian Mob", in which the authors argued that while Dick Cheney was CEO of Halliburton—from 1995 to 2000—the company received "$3.8 billion in federal contracts and taxpayer-insured loans".

In 2001, Global Integrity, an international project, was launched to systematically track and report on openness, accountability and the rule of law in various countries. It has since been incorporated independently.

In 2004, CPI's The Buying of the President book was on The New York Times Best Seller list for three months.

=== 2005–2007 ===
Lewis served as CPI's director until January 2005. As of his departure, CPI had published 14 books and more than 250 investigative reports. In 2005, CPI had a staff of 40 full-time Washington-based reporters who partnered with a network of writers and editors in more than 25 countries. Years later, Lewis said he decided to leave his position at CPI because "he didn't want it to become 'an institution that was Chuck's Excellent Adventure". Lewis' departure surprised and upset philanthropists Herb and Marion Sandler, who had partially funded the CPI's activities.

In December 2004, CPI's board of directors chose television journalist Roberta Baskin as Lewis's successor. Baskin came to CPI after directing consumer investigations for ABC News's 20/20 and serving as Washington correspondent for PBS's NOW with Bill Moyers.

In September 2005, CPI announced that it had discovered a pattern of plagiarism in the past work of a staff writer for CPI's 2002 book Capitol Offenders. CPI responded by hiring a copy editor to review all work, issuing a revised version of Capitol Offenders, sending letters of apology to all reporters whose work was plagiarized, authoring a new corrections policy, and returning an award the book received from Investigative Reporters and Editors. He went on to work for a political consulting firm that specializes in opposition research. In March 2007, he told the Milwaukee Journal-Sentinel that the center's official version "is not accurate in telling the full story of why I left the center," but did not elaborate.

Baskin led the organization until May 24, 2006.

Baskin was followed by Wendell Rawls Jr., who was named interim executive director. Rawls had previously served as the center's managing director, appointed to that post by Baskin on December 19, 2005. He joined CPI in August 2005.

=== 2007–2023 ===
In 2007, Rawls was succeeded by William Buzenberg, a vice president at American Public Media/Minnesota Public Radio. Buzenberg was first interviewed for the position in 2004 during the hiring process that ultimately led to the selection of his predecessor, Roberta Baskin.

According to a report by Lewis, "the number of full-time staff was reduced by one-third" in early 2007. By December 2007, the number of full-time staff had dropped to 25, down from a high of 40. At the time, Buzenberg said "It's a great, great place, but I will not mislead you... [Lewis] quite frankly left the center in great shape financially, but when you have a visionary who leaves, how do you continue? 'With difficulty' is the answer."

Baskin publicly disputed Buzenberg's claims in a letter to the American Journalism Review where she wrote, "contrary to the statement from current Executive Director Bill Buzenberg, the center was not left 'in great shape financially' by my predecessor. Much of the money raised during the year prior to my tenure was used to offset budget overruns on several previous projects. I replaced our director of development and made fundraising my number one priority, much as Buzenberg has done. As a rookie fundraiser, I take pride in the fact that I was able to raise millions of dollars."

In 2008, Lewis reflected on the transition period following his resignation and said, "I regret what happened to my staff and the condition of the Center. It's no secret it had a less than enviable few years. But that's one of the reasons I thought it was important to leave. I had founded it and run it for 15 years, and at some point the founder does have to leave the building...I don't regret it, I think it was important that I left, but I do feel badly about the hardship it brought to people I think the world of."

In 2010, The Huffington Post Investigative Fund merged into the CPI, and eight Huffington Post journalists moved to CPI.

In 2011, CPI eliminated 10 staff positions in order to compensate for a $2 million budget shortfall. Buzenberg and other senior staffers also took salary cuts. CPI board chairman Bruce Finzen said the budget would be "reduced between $2 million and $3 million, more like $2.5 million. The budget for next year will be in the 6 to 7 million range."

In April 2011, with support from the Knight Foundation, CPI launched iWatchnews.org as its main investigative reporting website. In August 2012, CPI stopped using iWatchnews.org and returned to its original domain.

Buzenberg stepped down from CPI at the end of 2014, at which time Peter Bale was named CEO. In November 2016, Bale resigned from the center to "pursue other international media opportunities" and John Dunbar assumed the role of chief executive officer.

In 2019, Susan Smith Richardson was named chief executive officer, becoming the first African-American CEO in the center's history.

=== 2024–2025 ===
In February 2024, CEO Paul Cheung resigned. The board also acted to eliminate the position of editor-in-chief, a post that had been held by Matt DeRienzo.

CPI had a revenue goal of $6 million for 2023, and fell about $2.5 million short of that. According to the New York Times, this shortfall created a situation of financial peril that threatened "to extinguish a newsroom of about 30 journalists that has watchdogged powerful institutions for decades." Due to the organization's financial difficulties, CPI considered merging with a competitor or shutting down.

In March 2024, CPI laid off 11 newsroom employees. That same month, Richard Tofel, the former president of ProPublica, wrote a Substack piece entitled "What Went Wrong at the Center for Public Integrity?" in which he discussed "what seems likely to be the end, one way or another, of CPI." Tofel identified considerable turnover at the top of the organization, cultural shortcomings of its board of directors, and strategic missteps as the three major factors which led to the organization's demise. In May 2024, a mass layoff saw almost all CPI workers lose their jobs.

CPI's last major piece was co-published in June 2024 and the organization had no staff by November 2024. In March 2025, CPI announced it had officially ceased operations and was in talks to give its archive to the Project on Government Oversight.

== Organizational structure ==
=== Funding ===
In its first year, CPI's budget was reported to be $200,000. In 2010, CPI had $9.2 million in revenue and $7.7 million in expenses. By 2022, annual revenues had declined to $5 million.

CPI reported receiving foundation support from a number of foundations, including the Sunlight Foundation, the Ethics and Excellence in Journalism Foundation, the Ford Foundation, the John D. and Catherine T. MacArthur Foundation, the John S. and James L. Knight Foundation, the Omidyar Network, the Open Society Foundations, and the Pew Charitable Trusts. The Barbra Streisand Foundation reported that it had funded CPI.

In July 2014, the Laura and John Arnold Foundation donated $2.8 million to CPI to launch a new project focused on state campaign finance. According to the International Business Times, "as CPI was negotiating the Arnold grant, Arnold's name was absent from a CPI report on pension politics". Arnold has spent at least $10 million on a campaign to roll back pension benefits for public workers.

=== Board of directors ===
As of March 2025, CPI's board of directors included chairman Wesley Lowery and members Jamaal Glenn, Olivier Kamanda, Jennifer 8. Lee, Sue Suh, Daniel Suleiman, and Andres Torres. Emeritus board members include Charles Lewis and Craig Newmark. In March 2025, Lowery stepped down as board chair amid allegations that he made inappropriate sexual comments and unwanted sexual advances at his full time job at American University. At the same time, CPI announced that it had officially ceased operations.

== International Consortium of Investigative Journalists ==
International Consortium of Investigative Journalists (ICIJ) logo

In 1997, CPI launched the International Consortium of Investigative Journalists (ICIJ), based in Washington, D.C. In 2016, the ICIJ spun off from CPI and became its own nonprofit due to financial difficulties with CPI.

=== Panama Papers ===
In April 2016, the ICIJ made headlines worldwide with the announcement that it and the German newspaper Süddeutsche Zeitung had received a leaked set of 11.5 million confidential documents from a secret source, created by the Panamanian corporate service provider Mossack Fonseca. The Panama Papers provided detailed information on more than 214,000 offshore companies, including the identities of shareholders and directors. The documents named the leaders of five countries — Argentina, Iceland, Saudi Arabia, Ukraine and the United Arab Emirates — as well as government officials, close relatives and close associates of various heads of government of more than 40 other countries, including Brazil, China, France, India, Malaysia, Mexico, Malta, Pakistan, Russia, South Africa, Spain, Syria and the United Kingdom.

The ICIJ and Süddeutsche Zeitung received the Panama Papers in 2015 and distributed them to about 400 journalists at 107 media organizations in more than 80 countries. The first news reports based on the set, along with 149 of the documents themselves, were published on April 3, 2016. Among other planned disclosures, the full list of companies is to be released in early May 2016.

== Ideology ==
A 2012 The New York Times editorial described the CPI as a "nonpartisan watchdog group".

In relation to a story in February 1996, CPI was characterized as a "liberal group" by the Los Angeles Times and The New York Times. Fairness and Accuracy in Reporting, a progressive media watchdog, has described CPI as "progressive."

== Reports ==
CPI's first report, America's Frontline Trade Officials, reported that nearly half of White House trade officials studied over a fifteen-year period became lobbyists for countries or overseas corporations after retirement. According to Lewis, it "prompted a Justice Department ruling, a General Accounting Office report, a Congressional hearing, was cited by four presidential candidates in 1992 and was partly responsible for an executive order in January 1993 by President Clinton, placing a lifetime ban on foreign lobbying by White House trade officials."

=== CPI Fat Cat Hotel 1996 ===
In 1996, CPI released a report called Fat Cat Hotel: How Democratic High-Rollers Are Rewarded with Overnight Stays at the White House. This report, written by Margaret Ebrahim, won an award from the Society of Professional Journalists. The report was an examination of the connection between overnight stays in the Lincoln Bedroom during the Clinton presidency and financial contributions to the Democratic Party as well as the Clinton re-election campaign.

=== CPI Windfalls of War 2003 ===
In 2003, CPI published Windfalls of War, a report arguing that campaign contributions to George W. Bush affected the allocation of reconstruction contracts in Afghanistan and Iraq. Slate ran a piece arguing that due to a statistically insignificant correlation coefficient between campaign donations and winning contracts, "CPI has no evidence to support its allegations."

=== CPI LobbyWatch 2005 ===
CPI's LobbyWatch series of reports started with its first reports in 2005. In their January 2005 publication entitled Pushing Prescriptions, CPI revealed that major pharmaceutical companies were the number one lobbyist in the United States spending $675 million over seven years on lobbying. They continued with this series in 2005 revealing how pharmaceutical companies had contacts even within the Food and Drug Administration and U.S. Trade Representatives.

=== CPI Who's Behind the Financial Meltdown? 2009 ===
CPI's report, Who's Behind the Financial Meltdown?, looking at the causes of the 2008 financial crisis, was featured in numerous media outlets, leading Columbia Journalism Review to ask, "Why hasn't a newspaper or magazine done this?"

=== CPI The Climate Change Lobby Explosion 2009 ===
More than 100 newspapers, magazines, wire services and websites cited CPI's report, The Climate Change Lobby Explosion, an analysis of Senate records showing that the number of climate lobbyists had grown by three hundred percent, numbering four for every Senator.

=== Tobacco Underground 2010 ===
Tobacco Underground, an ongoing project tracing the global trade in smuggled cigarettes, produced by CPI's International Consortium of Investigative Journalists, was honored with the Renner Award for Crime Reporting from Investigative Reporters and Editors (IRE), and the Overseas Press Club Award for Best Online International Reporting. The Tobacco Underground Project was funded by the Johns Hopkins Bloomberg School of Health. It is a cooperative project between the Center for Public Integrity's International Consortium of Investigative Journalists (ICIJ) and Organized Crime and Corruption Reporting Project (OCCRP) with journalists in Bosnia and Herzegovina, Romania, Russia and Ukraine. Journalists in Brazil, Belgium, Canada, China, Italy, Paraguay and the UK also participated. that won the Overseas Press Club Award and Investigative Reporters and Editors's Tom Renner Award for crime reporting.

=== Sexual Assault on Campus 2010 ===
In 2010, CPI partnered with National Public Radio to publish "Sexual Assault on Campus", a report which showcases the failures of colleges and government agencies to prevent sexual assaults and resolve sexual assault cases.

=== Toxic Clout 2013 ===
The year long investigation by CPI, Toxic Clout, produced in partnership with the PBS NewsHour, "unmasked the deep, sometimes hidden, connections entangling the chemical industry, scientists and regulators, revealing the industry's sway and the public's peril." Investigative journalists examined the work of the then California Department of Public Health's John Morgan who had been working since 1995, to debunk allegations that chromium had contributed to the cancer cluster attributed to Hinkley groundwater contamination. The CPI found glaring weaknesses in Morgan's analysis that challenge the validity of his findings. "In his first study, he dismisses what others see as a genuine cancer cluster in Hinkley. In his latest analysis, he excludes people who were exposed to the worst contamination." PBS Newshour broadcast the series which included "EPA Contaminated by Conflict of Interest", "Ouster of Scientist from EPA Panel Shows Industry Clout", starting in early 2013. CPI published a series of articles including "Toxic clout: how Washington works (badly)" and "How industry scientists stalled action on carcinogen."

=== Secrecy for Sale: offshore accounts 2013 to present ===
In 2013, International Consortium of Investigative Journalists released the results of a 15-month-long investigation based on 260 gigabytes of data regarding the ownership of secret offshore bank accounts. The data was obtained by Gerard Ryle as a result of his investigation into the Firepower scandal. The ICIJ partnered with the Guardian, BBC, Le Monde, The Washington Post, SonntagsZeitung, Süddeutsche Zeitung and NDR to produce an investigative series on offshore banking. ICIJ and partnering agencies used the ownership information to report on government corruption across the globe, tax avoidance schemes used by wealthy people, the use of secret offshore accounts in Ponzi schemes, the active role of major banks in facilitating secrecy for their clients, and the strategies and actors that make these activities possible.

In early 2014 the ICIJ revealed as part of their "Offshore Leaks" that relatives of China's political and financial elite were among those using offshore tax havens to store wealth.

=== Science for Sale ===
The 2016 series entitled Science for Sale included, the February 8, 2016 article "About Science for Sale", the February 8, 2016 article "Meet the 'rented white coats' who defend toxic chemicals", the February 10, 2016 article "Making a cancer cluster disappear", the February 16, 2016 article "Ford spent $40 million to reshape asbestos science", the February 18, 2016 article "Brokers of junk science?", and the March 31, 2016 article "Senators seek better conflict disclosures for scientific articles." In this investigative series which was co-published with Vice, journalist revealed how research backed by industry has opened debates on asbestos and arsenic with some of the paid scientists saying that "there are 'safe' levels of asbestos despite statements to the contrary from the World Health Organization and many other august bodies".

=== Professional fundraisers for veterans ===
In December 2017, CPI journalist Sarah Kleiner published a report on professional fundraisers who use telemarketing to collect donations for US military veterans, then keep 90 percent of the funds collected. According to the December 12, 2017 article, Brian Arthur Hampton co-founded two Falls Church, Virginia-based non-profit organizations: the Circle of Friends for American Veterans (COFAV)—also known as "American Homeless Veterans"—in 1993 and then the Center for American Homeless Veterans—also known as the "Association for Homeless and Disabled Veterans". During the 2000s, Hampton said he had "hosted more than 100 members of Congress across 196 veterans shelter-themed forums in 46 cities" in rallies for these non-profits. Kleiner revealed that according to the 2015 Center for American Homeless Veterans' tax returns, "it provided just $200 in grants to other organizations out of $2.5 million in overall expenditures, the vast majority of which paid telemarketers." This report confirms findings from the investigation by the Saint Louis, Missouri Better Business Bureau (BBB) and CharityWatch. The BBB had advised "consumers to exercise caution when deciding whether to contribute money" to Hampton's non-profit.

BBB also found that "[c]ontracts between the Center for American Homeless Veterans and "its two main fundraisers" – Reno, Nevada-based Outreach Calling and Phoenix, Arizona-based Midwest Publishing – revealed that "just 10 percent of all donations" go to the Center for American Homeless Veterans. The BBB investigation also revealed that from September 2014 to September 2016, Outreach Calling and Midwest Publishing "collected nearly $5 million, with about $508,000 going to the [Center for American Homeless Veterans] and "almost all the money retained" by the center, "went to pay salaries, legal fees and office-related expenses."

According to New York state regulators, "a wealthy 49-year-old New Jersey businessman", Mark Gelvan (b.1978), is the "driving force behind Outreach Calling." Outreach Calling collects money for "homeless veterans," "breast cancer survivors", "disabled police officers", and "children with leukemia", among others. According to a 2017 CPI analysis, "Outreach Calling, raised more than $118 million on behalf of about two dozen charities from 2011 to 2015", retaining $106 million. This left c. 10.3 percent or $12.2 million, for the non-profit charities and those they serve - homeless veterans, breast cancer survivors, disabled police officers, and children with leukemia. In the United States, it is legal for for-profit telemarketers to keep 90% of the donations they solicit as long as they to not "mislead prospective donors" or "lie to them about how their contributions will be used", according to Jim Sheehan, "head of the charities bureau for the office of New York Attorney General Eric T. Schneiderman."

=== Copycat bills ===
The CPI, USA TODAY, and The Arizona Republic undertook a collaborative two-year investigation into copycat bills, involving 30 investigative reporters across the United States, which culminated in a series of articles published in 2019. Specifically, their investigation examined the role of organizations, such as the American Legislative Exchange Council (ALEC), in the American legislative process through the use of so-called "model bills" or copycat bills. Data journalists, using a "unique-data analysis engine built on hundreds of cloud computers", compared "millions of words of legislation" from the LegiScan service, found that, from 2010 through 2018, legislators have introduced ALEC model bills 2,900 times. Six hundred of these became law. The data identified about 10,000 bills introduced in all American states, that included almost identical language. The investigation called the widespread successful use of these model bills spanning an eight-year period—which the report described as "fill-in-the-blank legislation"—amounts to "perhaps the largest unreported special-interest campaign in American politics." Journalists wrote that copycat bills drive agendas in almost "every statehouse" and touch almost every area of public policy. The data revealed how the traditional way of writing legislation "from scratch" had been supplanted by the use of ALEC bills in many states. Mississippi—with a total population of less than three million—has had more "model bills", that were written outside Mississippi, introduced into its Legislature than in any other state" in the United States.

== Reception ==
Kevin Phillips of National Public Radio has said, "no other investigative organization shines so many probing flashlights into so many Washington dirty-laundry baskets."

In 2006, Slate media critic Jack Shafer described CPI as having "broken as many stories as almost any big-city daily in the last couple of decades".

=== Funding from supporters of legal restrictions on campaign finance ===
Writing in The Wall Street Journal in March 2005, commentator John Fund accused CPI of being a member of what he termed the "campaign finance lobby." Citing a speech by Sean Treglia, former program manager at Pew Charitable Trusts, Fund argued that a "stealth campaign" by "eight liberal foundations" fomented a false sense of public demand for new restrictions on the financing of public campaigns. Fund singled out CPI as a front group pushing Pew's agenda, arguing that "reporters are used to attempts to hoodwink officials into thinking an issue is genuinely popular, and they frequently expose them. But when "good government" groups like the Center for Public Integrity engage in the same tactics, journalists usually ignore it."

CPI's Bill Allison responded to criticisms arising from Tregalia's speech by emphasizing that Pew's contributions to the CPI's work on campaign finance have always been forthrightly disclosed. In a published argument with blogger Ryan Sager, Allison also disputed the notion that the CPI's work amounted to advocacy. Allison stated, "the purpose of our grants is to do things like code hundreds of thousands of public records, put them in a database and post them on our Website so anyone can use them. The amount of money we've gotten to push campaign finance reform is $0.

In another essay on CPI's website, Allison challenged CPI's critics, and Fund specifically, arguing that:

[Fund] doesn't cite a single instance in which the Center has attempted to "hoodwink" government officials (or anyone else, for that matter) into thinking campaign finance is a genuinely popular issue, because he can't. We simply don't operate that way. We don't do public relations campaigns. We don't lobby Congress. We don't petition the Federal Election Commission. We don't pretend we have legions of individuals contributing money to support our work. Our paid membership amounts to around six thousand people; we'd certainly be happy to have more... as for Mr. Fund, back in the days when campaign finance issues were of concern to him, he sought us out to lend authority to his writings on John Huang and quoted us in an Oct. 29, 1996, column on the subject. Is it Mr. Fund's view that when he wrote about various DNC campaign finance violations, he was trying to hoodwink federal officials into thinking that people cared about the issue?

=== Looting the Seas controversy ===
In November 2010, CPI published a report on bluefin tuna overfishing entitled "Looting the Seas". Politico reported that "to obtain key information for the project, reporters accessed a database maintained by an intergovernmental fisheries regulatory body with a password given by a source, likely breaking the law." CPI's own lawyer and an outside law firm both determined that CPI's staff likely broke the law in obtaining information for the report. In addition, one of the experts quoted in the associated documentary was paid $15,000 as a project consultant to CPI. The investigative methods used to produce the report became a point of contention within the organization when CPI employee John Solomon made a number of accusations against the team that had worked on the series.

CPI board member and former The New York Times Washington bureau chief Bill Kovach was asked by then-CPI president William Buzenberg to look into the matter. Kovach concluded that CPI's reporting was "sound, ethical and fully in the public interest." In addition, the board hired an outside law firm to answer the legal questions. Columbia Journalism Review reported: "As for the legality of using the password to access data, the lawyers concluded that, in theory, a prosecutor might argue it violated the Computer Fraud and Abuse Act. But whether it actually did was open to debate. And, in any case, it was highly unlikely that charges would ever be brought." In the wake of the controversy, David Kaplan and John Solomon resigned from CPI. CPI officials also withdrew their entry of the tuna story for a Pulitzer Prize. Andy Revkin of The New York Times wrote, "the relationship of the television production to a United Nations agency and an environmental group can prompt questions about objectivity, but the package, over all, appears robust." The Looting the Seas series won two journalism awards: the Renner Award from Investigative Reporters and Editors and the 2010 Whitman Bassow Award from the Overseas Press Club of America.

=== Coordination with advocacy groups ===
In 2011, Politico called into question CPI's collaboration with advocacy organizations. Politico reported that CPI had coordinated the release of a report on Koch Industries with Greenpeace. Politico also reported that Pew Charitable Trusts, a funder of the Looting the Seas report, hosted a screening of a CPI documentary and then organized a call to action with other NGOs for the protection of bluefin tuna. In 2008, CPI published a report on tobacco that was both funded by and promoted by an advocacy group called Tobacco Free Kids.

=== Awards ===
In 1996, the CPI received the Society of Professional Journalists Sigma Delta Chi Award for Public Service in Online Journalism (Independent) for their report entitled "Fat Cat Hotel: How Democratic High-Rollers are Rewarded with Overnight Stays at the White House" by the Public i staff and Margaret Ebrahim.

CPI received the George Polk Award in 2003 for its investigation of US military spending in Iraq and Afghanistan ("Windfalls of War: U.S. Contractors in Iraq and Afghanistan"). Its work led to widespread media coverage that increased congressional scrutiny of military spending.

In 2011, CPI won a James Aronson Award for Social Justice Journalism for their investigation of weak inspections endangering factory workers and surrounding communities.

In 2012, CPI reporter Michael Hudson won a "Best-in-Business" award for digital investigative reporting from the Society of American Business Editors and Writers. Hudson won the award for his report entitled The Great Mortgage Cover-Up.

CPI's work has also received awards from PEN USA, Investigative Reporters and Editors, the Society of Professional Journalists, the Association of Capitol Reporters and Editors, the National Press Foundation, the Joan Shorenstein Center on the Press, Politics and Public Policy and others.

CPI reporter Chris Hamby won the 2014 Pulitzer Prize for investigative reporting. Hamby's story reported that doctors and lawyers working for the coal industry helped defeat benefit claims of coal miners who had contracted black lung disease. After CPI's Pulitzer win, Politico reported that "ABC News has accused The Center for Public Integrity of downplaying the network's contributions to a Pulitzer Prize-winning investigative report, setting off a bitter public dispute between two news organizations that once worked as partners." CPI executive director Bill Buzenberg said that ABC News overstated its contributions to the story.

In 2022, the Center for Public Integrity and Transmitter Media was nominated for a Podcast & Radio Peabody Award for their episode The Wealth Vortex.

== Published books ==
- Borders, Rebecca; Dockery, C.C. (1995). Beyond the Hill: A Directory of Congress from 1984 to 1993. University Press of America. ISBN 978-0-8191-9820-4.
- Lewis, Charles; Benes, Alejandro; O'Brien, Meredith; The Center for Public Integrity (1996). The Buying of the President. Avon Books. ISBN 978-0-380-78420-2.
- Fagin, Dan; Lavelle, Marianne; The Center for Public Integrity (1997). Toxic Deception: How the Chemical Industry Manipulates Science, Bends the Law and Endangers Your Health. Carol Publishing Corp. ISBN 978-1-55972-385-5.
- Lewis, Charles; The Center for Public Integrity (1998). The Buying of the Congress: How Special Interests Have Stolen Your Right to Life, Liberty and the Pursuit of Happiness. Avon Books. ISBN 978-0-380-97596-9.
- Green, Alan (1999). Animal Underworld: Inside America's Black Market for Rare and Exotic Species. Public Affairs. ISBN 978-1-58648-374-6.
- Lewis, Charles; The Center for Public Integrity (2000). The Buying of the President 2000. Harper Perennial. ISBN 978-0-380-79519-2.
- The Center for Public Integrity (2000). Citizen Muckraking: Stories and Tools for Defeating the Goliaths of Our Day. Common Courage Media. ISBN 978-1-56751-188-8.
- Lewis, Charles; Allison, Bill; the Center for Public Integrity (2001). The Cheating of America: How Tax Avoidance and Evasion by the Super Rich Are Costing the Country Billions, and What You Can Do About It. William Morrow & Company. ISBN 978-0-380-97682-9.
- Renzulli, Diane; Center for Public Integrity, The (2002). Capitol Offenders: How Private Interests Govern Our States. Public Integrity Books. ISBN 978-1-882583-14-0.
- Harmful Error. The Center for Public Integrity. 2003. ISBN 978-1-882583-18-8.
- The Water Barons: How a Few Powerful Companies are Privatizing Our Water. The Center for Public Integrity. 2003.
- Lewis, Charles; the Center for Public Integrity (2004). The Buying of the President 2004: Who's Really Bankrolling Bush and His Challengers—and What They Expect in Return. Harper Paperbacks. ISBN 978-0-06-054853-7.
- The Corruption Notebooks. The Center for Public Integrity. 2004. ISBN 978-1-882583-19-5.
- Networks of Influence: The Political Power of the Communications Industry. Center for Public Integrity. 2005. ISBN 978-1-882583-20-1.
- Center for Public Integrity, The (2007). City Adrift: New Orleans Before & After Katrina. Louisiana State University Press. ISBN 978-0-8071-3284-5.

== See also ==
- Institute for Nonprofit News
