= National Association of State Charity Officials =

National Association of State Charities Officials (NASCO) is an American association of state charity regulators and assistant attorneys general that provides an interstate forum for cooperative efforts on state charity regulation.

== History ==
In 1979 when NASCO was established, there was a "patchwork of state laws governing charities." NASCO "informally merged" with the National Association of Attorneys General (NAAG) in 1984.

== Annual conferences ==
NASCO works with the NAAG Charities Committee to facilitate training and annual seminars. The large annual conferences are considered to be the NASCO's "most significant activity." These conferences include a Public Day which includes participation from "nonprofit leaders, professional counselors and advisers, and academics" in conversations about "the latest trends and enforcement priorities of state-level charities regulators".

=== Give & Take: Consumers, Contributions, and Charity Conference (2017) ===
In March 2017 NASCO and Federal Trade Commission (FTC) co-facilitated a conference entitled "Give & Take: Consumers, Contributions, and Charity Conference."

=== The Evolving World of State Charities Regulation (2016) ===
The October 16, 2016 "Public Day" focused on "non-traditional models of philanthropy; regulation of donor-advised funds, endowments, and restricted gifts; top issues in corporate governance and the importance of nonprofit board education; new tools for the nonprofit sector; current trends in cybersecurity and how to handle data breaches." There was also an update on "the collaboration between the Federal Trade Commission (FTC) and regulators from all 50 states and the District of Columbia in the historic civil suit against four cancer charities in 2015". The Reynolds cancer charities, were America's worst charities, a series of "sham charities" run by James T. Reynolds along with friends and family members. The Cancer Fund of America was listed in the Times/CIR 2013 report as the second worst charity in the United States. The three others investigated by the FTC in 2015 were the Cancer Support Services, Children's Cancer Fund of America, and the Breast Cancer Society.

=== 2015 ===
At the Public Day of the 2015 Conference it was noted that the Internal Revenue Service had taken a " a less active role in the monitoring and regulation of the nation's nonprofits". The responsibility had shifted to State regulators who enforce State laws.

=== Charities & Regulators, Doing More With Less During Hard Economic Times (2010) ===
In September - October 2010, the theme of the conference was "Charities & Regulators, Doing More With Less During Hard Economic Times" which included "an "Inside the Beltway" update of nonprofit initiatives from federal regulators and the U.S. Senate Finance Committee as well as panels addressing the role of government in oversight of nonprofit governance, how best to measure what makes an effective charity, and the creation and regulation of innovative fundraising strategies."
