= Biathlon at the 2012 Winter Youth Olympics =

Biathlon at the I Winter Youth Olympic Games
- Venue: Seefeld Arena; Seefeld
- Dates: 15–19 January
- Competitors: 99 from 33 nations

Biathlon at the 2012 Winter Youth Olympics took place at the temporary Biathlon Course at the Seefeld Arena venue in Innsbruck, Austria. One of the mixed events is contested together with cross-country skiers.

== Medal table ==
| Rank | Nation | Gold | Silver | Bronze | Total |
|---|---|---|---|---|---|
| 1 | Germany | 3 | 1 | 0 | 4 |
| 2 | China | 1 | 0 | 1 | 2 |
| 2 | Russia | 1 | 0 | 1 | 2 |
| 4 | Estonia | 0 | 2 | 0 | 2 |
| 5 | Kazakhstan | 0 | 1 | 1 | 2 |
| 6 | Norway | 0 | 1 | 0 | 1 |
| 7 | France | 0 | 0 | 2 | 2 |
| Totals (7 entries) | | 5 | 5 | 5 | 15 |

== Events ==
=== Boys' events ===
| Event | Gold | | Silver | | Bronze | |
|---|---|---|---|---|---|---|
| Sprint | Cheng Fangming; China | 19:21.7 (0+1) | Rene Zahkna; Estonia | 19:43.0 (0+1) | Aristide Bègue; France | 19:48.5 (1+0) |
| Pursuit | Niklas Homberg; Germany | 28:43.1 (2+0+2+0) | Rene Zahkna; Estonia | 28:52.6 (0+2+1+1) | Cheng Fangming; China | 28:57.7 (2+1+1+3) |

=== Girls' events ===
| Event | Gold | | Silver | | Bronze | |
|---|---|---|---|---|---|---|
| Sprint | Franziska Preuß; Germany | 17:27.7 (0+1) | Galina Vishnevskaya; Kazakhstan | 17:55.2 (1+1) | Uliana Kaisheva; Russia | 18:00.9 (1+1) |
| Pursuit | Uliana Kaisheva; Russia | 26:01.3 (0+0+0+0) | Franziska Preuß; Germany | 26:29.2 (1+0+1+0) | Galina Vishnevskaya; Kazakhstan | 27:44.4 (0+2+1+1) |

=== Mixed events ===
| Event | Gold | | Silver | | Bronze | |
|---|---|---|---|---|---|---|
| Mixed relay | Germany; Franziska Preuß; Laura Hengelhaupt; Maximilian Janke; Niklas Homberg | 1:11:06.8 (0+0) (0+2) (0+1) (0+0) (0+1) (0+0) (0+2) (0+1) | Norway; Kristin Sandeggen; Karoline Næss; Haakon Livik; Kristian Andre Aalerud | 1:13:11.7 (0+1) (0+0) (0+1) (0+1) (0+1) (0+1) (0+0) (0+3) | France; Léa Ducordeau; Chloé Chevalier; Fabien Claude; Aristide Bègue | 1:13:27.8 (0+1) (0+0) (0+2) (1+3) (0+1) (0+2) (0+1) (0+2) |

== Multi-medalists ==
Athletes who have won at least two medals.

| Rank | Nation | Gold | Silver | Bronze | Total |
|---|---|---|---|---|---|
| 1 | Franziska Preuß (GER) | 2 | 1 | 0 | 3 |
| 2 | Niklas Homberg (GER) | 2 | 0 | 0 | 2 |
| 3 | Cheng Fangming (CHN) | 1 | 0 | 1 | 2 |
| 3 | Uliana Kaisheva (RUS) | 1 | 0 | 1 | 2 |
| 5 | Rene Zahkna (EST) | 0 | 2 | 0 | 2 |
| 6 | Galina Vishnevskaya (KAZ) | 0 | 1 | 1 | 2 |
| 7 | Aristide Bègue (FRA) | 0 | 0 | 2 | 2 |

== Qualification system ==
=== Qualification summary ===
| NOC | Men | Women | Total |
|---|---|---|---|
| Armenia | | 1 | 1 |
| Australia | 1 | | 1 |
| Austria | 2 | 2 | 4 |
| Belarus | 2 | 2 | 4 |
| Bulgaria | 2 | 2 | 4 |
| Canada | 2 | 2 | 4 |
| China | 1 | 2 | 3 |
| Croatia | 1 | | 1 |
| Czech Republic | 2 | 2 | 4 |
| Estonia | 2 | 2 | 4 |
| Finland | 2 | 2 | 4 |
| France | 2 | 2 | 4 |
| Germany | 2 | 2 | 4 |
| Great Britain | 1 | | 1 |
| Hungary | 1 | | 1 |
| Italy | 2 | 2 | 4 |
| Kazakhstan | 1 | 2 | 3 |
| Latvia | 2 | 1 | 3 |
| Lithuania | 1 | 1 | 2 |
| Moldova | | 1 | 1 |
| New Zealand | | 1 | 1 |
| Norway | 2 | 2 | 4 |
| Poland | 2 | 2 | 4 |
| Romania | 1 | 2 | 3 |
| Russia | 2 | 2 | 4 |
| Serbia | 1 | | 1 |
| Slovakia | 2 | 2 | 4 |
| Slovenia | 2 | 2 | 4 |
| South Korea | 1 | 1 | 2 |
| Sweden | 2 | 2 | 4 |
| Switzerland | 2 | 1 | 3 |
| Ukraine | 2 | 2 | 4 |
| United States | 2 | 2 | 4 |
| Total athletes | 50 | 49 | 99 |
| Total NOCs | 30 | 28 | 33 |
