= Cross-country skiing at the 2012 Winter Youth Olympics =

Cross-country skiing at the I Winter Youth Olympic Games
- Venue: Seefeld Arena; Seefeld
- Dates: 14–16 January
- Competitors: 90 from 43 nations

Cross-country skiing at the 2012 Youth Winter Olympics took place at the Cross-Country World Cup Course at the Seefeld Arena in Seefeld, Austria from 14 to 16 January. Five events were contested (2 per gender) and a mixed relay with biathlon athletes.

== Medal summary ==
=== Medal table ===
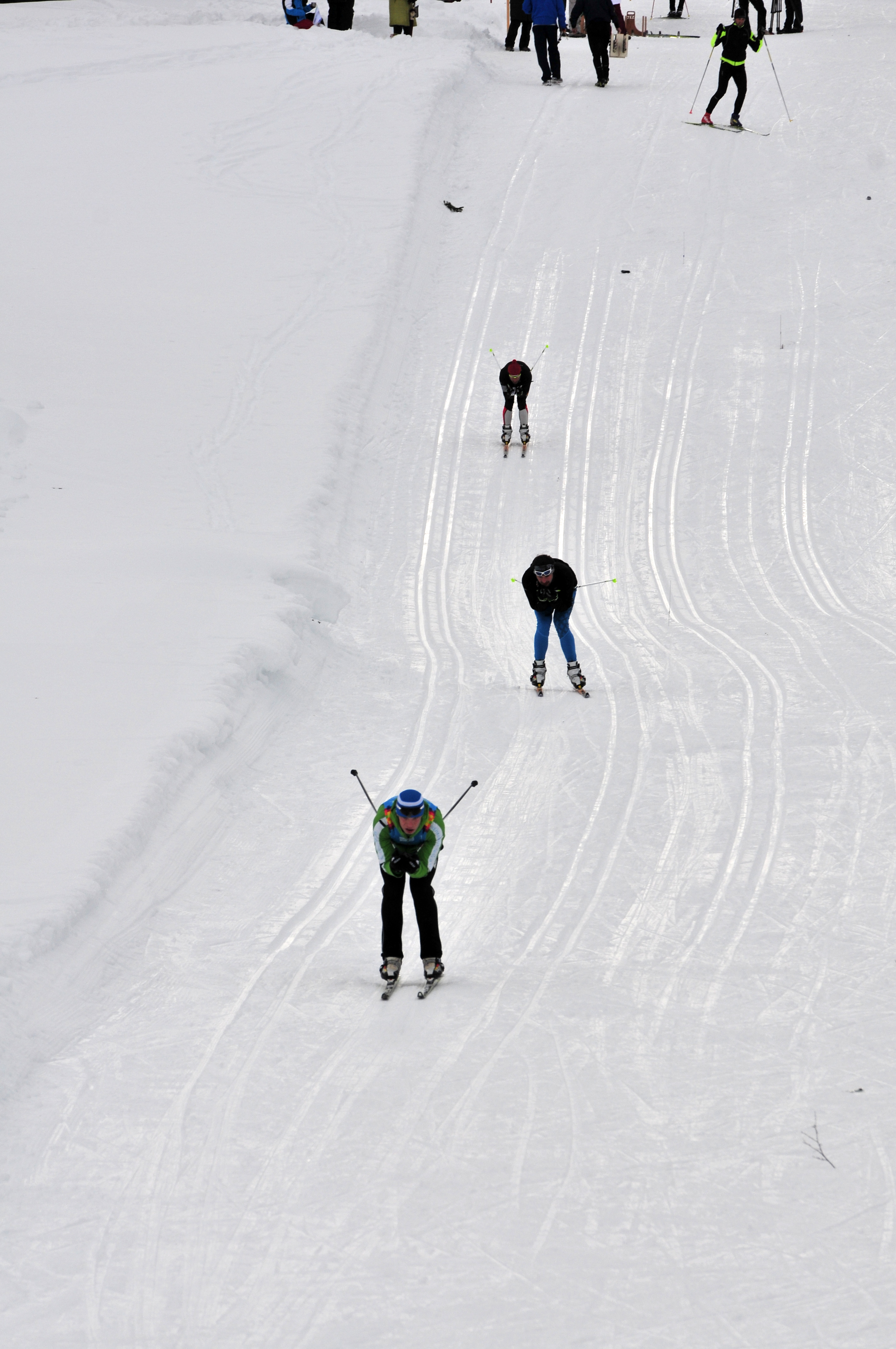
Cross-county skiing at eventday

Rank	Nation	Gold	Silver	Bronze	Total
1	Norway	2	0	1	3
1	Russia	2	0	1	3
3	Slovenia	0	1	1	2
4	Germany	0	1	0	1
4	Japan	0	1	0	1
4	Sweden	0	1	0	1
7	Kazakhstan	0	0	1	1
Totals (7 entries)		4	4	4	12

=== Events ===
Event	Gold		Silver		Bronze	
Boys' 10 kilometre classical	Alexander Selyaninov; Russia	29:28.8	Kentaro Ishikawa; Japan	29:40.2	Sergey Malyshev; Kazakhstan	29:57.5
Boys' sprint	Andreas Molden; Norway	1:44.1	Marius Cebulla; Germany	+0.6	Alexander Selyaninov; Russia	+0.9
Girls' 5 kilometre classical	Anastasia Sedova; Russia	14:18.0	Anamarija Lampič; Slovenia	14:37.7	Lea Einfalt; Slovenia	15:01.2
Girls' sprint	Silje Theodorsen; Norway	1:57.4	Jonna Sundling; Sweden	+0.1	Linn Eriksen; Norway	+0.1

== Qualification summary ==
NOC	Boys	Girls	Total
Argentina	1		1
Armenia	1	1	2
Australia	1	1	2
Austria	2	2	4
Belarus	1	1	2
Bosnia and Herzegovina	1		1
Bulgaria	1	1	2
Canada	1	1	2
China		1	1
Croatia	1	1	2
Czech Republic	1	1	2
Denmark	1	1	2
Estonia	1	1	2
Finland	2	2	4
France	2	2	4
Germany	2	2	4
Great Britain	1	1	2
Greece	1		1
Hungary	1		1
Iceland	1		1
Iran	1		1
Italy	1	1	2
Japan	2	2	4
Kazakhstan	1	1	2
Kyrgyzstan	1		1
Latvia	1	1	2
Liechtenstein	1		1
Lithuania	1	1	2
Macedonia	1		1
Mongolia	1		1
Norway	2	2	4
Poland	1	1	2
Romania	1	1	2
Russia	2	2	4
Slovakia	1	1	2
Slovenia	2	2	4
South Korea	1	1	2
Spain	1	1	2
Sweden	1	1	2
Switzerland	1	1	2
Turkey	1		1
Ukraine	1	1	2
United States	1	1	2
Total athletes	50	40	90
Total NOCs	42	32	43
