= Luge at the 2012 Winter Youth Olympics =

Luge at the I Winter Youth Olympic Games
- Venue: Olympic Sliding Centre Innsbruck
- Dates: 15–17 January
- Competitors: 70 from 21 nations

Luge at the 2012 Winter Youth Olympics took place at the Olympic Sliding Centre Innsbruck venue in Innsbruck, Austria.

== Medal summary ==
=== Medal table ===
* Host nation (Austria)

Rank	Nation	Gold	Silver	Bronze	Total
1	Germany	1	3	1	5
2	Austria*	1	0	1	2
2	United States	1	0	1	2
4	Italy	1	0	0	1
5	Latvia	0	1	1	2
Totals (5 entries)		4	4	4	12

=== Events ===
Events	Gold	Silver	Bronze
Boys' singles	Christian Paffe; Germany	Riks Rozītis; Latvia	Toni Gräfe; Germany
Girls' singles	Miriam Kastlunger; Austria	Saskia Langer; Germany	Ulla Zirne; Latvia
Doubles	Florian Gruber; Simon Kainzwaldner; Italy	Tim Brendl; Florian Funk; Germany	Ty Andersen; Pat Edmunds; United States
Mixed team relay	United States; Summer Britcher; Tucker West; Ty Andersen; Pat Edmunds	Germany; Saskia Langer; Christian Paffe; Tim Brendl; Florian Funk	Austria; Miriam Kastlunger; Armin Frauscher; Thomas Steu; Lorenz Koller

== Qualification system ==
The rankings from the 2010–11 and 2011–12 Junior Luge world cup were used to qualify entries. The maximum total for an NOC is six athletes (2 boys, 2 girls and one doubles), with a maximum total of 20 athletes in the singles and 15 in the doubles. If the host nation has not qualified, the last quota spot is awarded to Austria. If an event does not have enough qualifiers, the quota spots left over will be allocated to the other events equally. A nation can enter the team event if it has qualified an athlete in each event. If spots are reallocated, first priority will be given to nations that have not qualified an athlete yet.

=== Boys' singles ===
Boy's standings

Event	Vacancies	Qualified
Luge World Cups (2010-11/2011-12)	18	Latvia; Canada; Canada; Austria; Austria; Germany; Russia; Russia; United States; Ukraine; Germany; Slovakia; Italy; ~~Italy~~; Slovakia; Latvia; Ukraine; ~~Slovakia~~; United States; Australia
Reallocated	7	Poland; Bulgaria; Chinese Taipei; New Zealand; Romania; Bosnia and Herzegovina; Switzerland
TOTAL	25	

=== Boys' doubles ===
Doubles standings

Event	Vacancies	Qualified
Luge World Cups (2010-11/2011-12)	15	Russia; Ukraine; Latvia; Germany; Slovakia; Romania; Kazakhstan; Austria; United States; Poland; Italy
TOTAL	11	

- Only 11 countries were eligible for quota spots through the rankings.

=== Girls' singles ===
Event	Vacancies	Qualified
Luge World Cups (2010-11/2011–12)	20	Latvia; United States; Russia; Austria; Austria; Italy; Italy; Germany; Russia; Ukraine; Czech Republic; Canada; Ukraine; Slovakia; United States; Norway; Norway; Romania; Croatia; Kazakhstan
Reallocated	4	Romania; Poland; Croatia; Slovakia
Total	24	

=== Qualification summary ===
NOC	Boys	Girls	Doubles	Team relay	Total
Australia	1				1
Austria	2	2	1	X	6
Bosnia and Herzegovina	1				1
Bulgaria	1				1
Canada	2	1			3
Croatia		2			2
Czech Republic		1			1
Germany	2	1	1	X	5
Italy	1	2	1	X	5
Kazakhstan	1	1	1	X	4
Latvia	2	1	1	X	5
Norway		2			2
New Zealand	1				1
Poland	1	1	1	X	4
Romania	1	2	1	X	5
Russia	2	2	1	X	6
Slovakia	1	2	1	X	5
Switzerland	1				1
Chinese Taipei	1				1
Ukraine	2	2	1	X	6
United States	2	2	1	X	6
Total athletes	25	24	22	40	70
Total NOCs	18	15	11	11	21
