= Cross-country skiing at the 2012 Winter Youth Olympics – Girls' 5 kilometre classical =

Girls' 5 kilometre classical at the I Winter Youth Olympic Games
- Venue: Seefeld Arena
- Date: 17 January
- Competitors: 40 from 32 nations
- Winning time: 14:18.0

Medalists
1st place, gold medalist(s)		Anastasia Sedova	Russia
2nd place, silver medalist(s)		Anamarija Lampič	Slovenia
3rd place, bronze medalist(s)		Lea Einfalt	Slovenia

The girls' 5 kilometre classical cross-country skiing competition at the 2012 Winter Youth Olympics was held on 17 January at the Seefeld Arena.

== Results ==
The race was started at 10:00.

Rank	Bib	Athlete	Country	Time	Deficit
1st place, gold medalist(s)	36	Anastasia Sedova	Russia	14:18.0	
2nd place, silver medalist(s)	37	Anamarija Lampič	Slovenia	14:37.7	+19.7
3rd place, bronze medalist(s)	39	Lea Einfalt	Slovenia	15:01.2	+43.2
4	33	Silje Theodorsen	Norway	15:05.6	+47.6
5	38	Alisa Zhambalova	Russia	15:15.8	+57.8
6	28	Victoria Carl	Germany	15:20.9	+1:02.9
7	25	Julia Belger	Germany	15:32.5	+1:14.5
8	22	Kozue Takizawa	Japan	15:45.3	+1:27.3
9	35	Jonna Sundling	Sweden	15:45.9	+1:27.9
10	19	Nadine Fähndrich	Switzerland	15:56.6	+1:38.6
11	29	Linn Eriksen	Norway	16:03.3	+1:45.3
12	10	Barbora Klementová	Slovakia	16:16.5	+1:58.5
13	32	Heather Mooney	United States	16:18.8	+2:00.8
14	40	Katri Lylynperä	Finland	16:18.9	+2:00.9
15	27	Oksana Shatalova	Ukraine	16:22.0	+2:04.0
16	26	Urszula Łętocha	Poland	16:22.3	+2:04.3
17	30	Maya MacIsaac-Jones	Canada	16:31.0	+2:13.0
18	21	Leena Nurmi	Finland	16:34.6	+2:16.6
19	14	Maki Ohdaira	Japan	16:34.8	+2:16.8
20	1	Ma Chun	China	16:34.9	+2:16.9
21	15	Kelly Vainlo	Estonia	16:40.1	+2:22.1
22	34	Lisa Unterweger	Austria	16:42.9	+2:24.9
23	13	Ina Lukonina	Belarus	16:48.8	+2:30.8
24	11	Alice Canclini	Italy	16:50.6	+2:32.6
25	12	Rea Raušel	Croatia	16:59.1	+2:41.1
26	23	Alexandra Kun	Kazakhstan	17:11.6	+2:53.6
27	16	Constance Vulliet	France	17:15.0	+2:57.0
28	31	Sandra Bader	Austria	17:26.2	+3:08.2
29	6	Kristina Kazlauskaitė	Lithuania	17:29.1	+3:11.1
30	24	Petra Hynčicová	Czech Republic	17:38.6	+3:20.6
31	20	Alison Perrillat-Amede	France	17:41.7	+3:23.7
32	7	Sarah Hale	Great Britain	17:44.0	+3:26.0
33	17	Lee Yeong-ae	South Korea	18:12.6	+3:54.6
34	9	Lucy Glanville	Australia	18:23.0	+4:05.0
35	18	Simona Ungureanu	Romania	18:52.9	+4:34.9
36	5	Yaiza Barajas	Spain	19:04.0	+4:46.0
37	2	Carlsen Caroline Ryge	Denmark	20:04.8	+5:46.8
38	4	Zane Eglīte	Latvia	20:54.0	+6:36.0
39	3	Lilit Tonoyan	Armenia	20:59.6	+6:41.6
	8	Kameliya Ilieva	Bulgaria	Did not finish	
