= Alpine skiing at the 2012 Winter Youth Olympics – Girls' combined =

Girls' combined at the I Winter Youth Olympic Games
- Venue: Patscherkofel
- Date: January 15
- Competitors: 42 from 35 nations
- Winning time: 1:40.82

Medalists
1st place, gold medalist(s)		Magdalena Fjällström	Sweden
2nd place, silver medalist(s)		Estelle Alphand	France
3rd place, bronze medalist(s)		Adriana Jelinkova	Netherlands

The girls' combined competition of the alpine skiing events at the 2012 Winter Youth Olympics in Innsbruck, Austria, was held on January 15, at the Patscherkofel. 42 athletes from 35 countries took part in this event.

== Results ==
The race was started at 10:15.

Rank	Bib	Name	Country	Super-G	Rank	Slalom	Rank	Total	Difference
1st place, gold medalist(s)	9	Magdalena Fjällström	Sweden	1:05.23	2	35.59	2	1:40.82	
2nd place, silver medalist(s)	11	Estelle Alphand	France	1:04.74	1	36.67	7	1:41.41	+0.59
3rd place, bronze medalist(s)	24	Adriana Jelinkova	Netherlands	1:05.54	3	36.67	8	1:42.21	+1.39
4	4	Petra Vlhová	Slovakia	1:06.71	14	35.51	1	1:42.22	+1.40
5	1	Martina Rettenwender	Austria	1:05.84	7	36.41	3	1:42.25	+1.43
6	2	Clara Direz	France	1:05.64	5	36.67	6	1:42.31	+1.49
7	3	Luana Flütsch	Switzerland	1:06.01	10	36.53	4	1:42.54	+1.72
8	15	Ekaterina Tkachenko	Russia	1:05.88	9	37.21	12	1:43.09	+2.27
9	32	Roni Remme	Canada	1:06.37	12	36.89	10	1:43.26	+2.44
10	7	Jasmine Fiorano	Italy	1:06.40	13	36.87	9	1:43.27	+2.45
11	13	Saša Brezovnik	Slovenia	1:06.85	15	36.63	5	1:43.48	+2.66
12	6	Veronica Olivieri	Italy	1:05.70	6	37.82	13	1:43.52	+2.70
13	12	Greta Small	Australia	1:06.13	11	38.07	14	1:44.20	+3.38
14	31	Saša Tršinski	Croatia	1:06.93	16	38.28	15	1:45.21	+4.39
15	17	Helga María Vilhjálmsdóttir	Iceland	1:08.44	20	37.00	11	1:45.44	+4.62
16	16	Piera Hudson	New Zealand	1:07.52	17	40.28	20	1:47.80	+6.98
17	20	Julia Mueller-Ristine	United States	1:07.93	18	40.17	19	1:48.10	+7.28
18	30	Kayo Denda	Japan	1:09.29	24	38.95	17	1:48.24	+7.42
19	37	Katarzyna Wasek	Poland	1:10.14	25	38.44	16	1:48.58	+7.76
20	34	Delfina Constantini	Argentina	1:09.26	23	39.83	18	1:49.09	+8.27
21	25	Sara Ramentol	Andorra	1:08.53	22	40.75	21	1:49.28	+8.48
22	38	Agnese Āboltiņa	Latvia	1:10.67	26	41.62	24	1:52.29	+11.47
23	36	Aleksandra Popova	Bulgaria	1:11.34	27	41.13	22	1:52.47	+11.65
24	35	Olivia Schoultz	Finland	1:11.82	28	41.14	23	1:52.96	+12.14
25	21	Jo Eun-hwa	South Korea	1:12.71	29	41.86	25	1:54.57	+13.75
26	29	Julie Faarup	Denmark	1:13.34	31	48.11	27	2:01.43	+20.61
27	41	Dila Kavur	Turkey	1:19.80	32	47.62	26	2:07.42	+26.60
28	28	Claudia Seidl	Slovenia	1:08.44	20	1:01.19	30	2:09.63	+28.81
29	40	Celine Kairouz	Lebanon	1:21.08	33	48.66	28	2:09.74	+28.92
30	42	Hadis Ahmadi	Iran	1:24.82	34	50.15	29	2:14.97	+34.15
	22	Anastasiia Gorbunova	Ukraine	1:12.84	30	DNS			
	5	Nora Grieg Christensen	Norway	1:05.63	4	DNF			
	10	Jasmina Suter	Switzerland	1:05.84	7	DNF			
	19	Dominika Drozdíková	Czech Republic	1:08.30	19	DNF			
	8	Christina Ager	Austria	DNF					
	14	Alisa Krauss	Germany	DNF					
	18	Mikaela Tommy	Canada	DNF					
	23	Ona Rocamora	Spain	DNF					
	26	Rachelle Rogers	Great Britain	DNF					
	27	Triin Tobi	Estonia	DNF					
	33	Jenny Reinold	Germany	DNF					
	39	Zsuzsanna Ury	Hungary	DNF					
