= Alpine skiing at the 2012 Winter Youth Olympics – Girls' super-G =

Girls' super-G at the I Winter Youth Olympic Games
- Venue: Patscherkofel
- Date: 14 January
- Competitors: 44 from 36 nations
- Winning time: 1:05.78

Medalists
1st place, gold medalist(s)		Estelle Alphand	France
2nd place, silver medalist(s)		Nora Grieg Christensen	Norway
3rd place, bronze medalist(s)		Christina Ager	Austria

The girls' super-G competition of the alpine skiing events at the 2012 Winter Youth Olympics in Innsbruck, Austria, was held on January 14, at Patscherkofel. 44 athletes from 36 countries took part in this event.

== Result ==
The race started at 10:45.

Rank	Bib	Name	Country	Time	Difference
1st place, gold medalist(s)	9	Estelle Alphand	France	1:05.78	
2nd place, silver medalist(s)	15	Nora Grieg Christensen	Norway	1:05.79	+0.01
3rd place, bronze medalist(s)	4	Christina Ager	Austria	1:06.06	+0.28
4	2	Clara Direz	France	1:06.09	+0.31
5	6	Martina Rettenwender	Austria	1:06.10	+0.32
6	5	Magdalena Fjällström	Sweden	1:06.23	+0.45
7	10	Greta Small	Australia	1:06.52	+0.74
8	12	Veronica Olivieri	Italy	1:06.59	+0.81
9	22	Petra Vlhová	Slovakia	1:06.86	+1.08
10	3	Luana Flütsch	Switzerland	1:06.99	+1.21
11	16	Mikaela Tommy	Canada	1:07.06	+1.28
12	32	Saša Tršinski	Croatia	1:07.07	+1.29
13	18	Adriana Jelinkova	Netherlands	1:07.22	+1.44
14	1	Ekaterina Tkachenko	Russia	1:07.39	+1.61
15	34	Jenny Reinold	Germany	1:07.42	+1.64
16	24	Sara Ramentol	Andorra	1:07.96	+2.18
17	11	Piera Hudson	New Zealand	1:08.06	+2.28
18	23	Dominika Drozdíková	Czech Republic	1:08.47	+2.69
19	21	Ona Rocamora	Spain	1:08.99	+3.21
20	27	Claudia Seidl	Slovenia	1:09.92	+4.14
21	36	Olivia Schoultz	Finland	1:10.27	+4.49
22	35	Delfina Constantini	Argentina	1:10.50	+4.72
23	31	Kayo Denda	Japan	1:10.77	+4.99
24	25	Rachelle Rogers	Great Britain	1:11.05	+5.27
25	37	Aleksandra Popova	Bulgaria	1:11.92	+6.14
26	30	Anastasiia Gorbunova	Ukraine	1:12.53	+6.75
27	39	Agnese Aboltina	Latvia	1:13.14	+7.36
28	29	Jo Eun-hwa	South Korea	1:13.85	+8.07
29	40	Zsuzsanna Úry	Hungary	1:14.36	+8.58
30	44	Dila Kavur	Turkey	1:20.46	+14.68
31	43	Celine Kairouz	Lebanon	1:25.79	+20.01
32	45	Hadis Ahmadi	Iran	1:28.41	+22.63
	7	Jasmina Suter	Switzerland	Did not finish	
	8	Saša Brezovnik	Slovenia	Did not finish	
	13	Jasmine Fiorano	Italy	Did not finish	
	14	Mina Fürst Holtmann	Norway	Did not finish	
	17	Alisa Krauss	Germany	Did not finish	
	19	Julia Mueller-Ristine	United States	Did not finish	
	20	Helga María Vilhjálmsdóttir	Iceland	Did not finish	
	26	Triin Tobi	Estonia	Did not finish	
	28	Julie Faarup	Denmark	Did not finish	
	33	Roni Remme	Canada	Did not finish	
	42	Mariya Grigorova	Kazakhstan	Disqualified	
	38	Katarzyna Wąsek	Poland	Disqualified	
	41	Anastasia Gkogkou	Greece	Did not start	
