= Cross-country skiing at the 2012 Winter Youth Olympics – Girls' sprint =

Girls' sprint at the I Winter Youth Olympic Games
- Venue: Seefeld Arena
- Date: 19 January
- Competitors: 40 from 32 nations
- Winning time: 1:57.4

Medalists
| 1st place, gold medalist(s) | | Silje Theodorsen | Norway |
| 2nd place, silver medalist(s) | | Jonna Sundling | Sweden |
| 3rd place, bronze medalist(s) | | Linn Eriksen | Norway |

The girls' sprint freestyle cross-country skiing competition at the 2012 Winter Youth Olympics was held on 19 January at the Seefeld Arena.

== Results ==
=== Qualification ===
The qualification was held at 15:45.

| Rank | Bib | Athlete | Country | Time | Deficit | Notes |
|---|---|---|---|---|---|---|
| 1 | 9 | Silje Theodorsen | Norway | 1:55.10 | | Q |
| 2 | 3 | Jonna Sundling | Sweden | 1:55.57 | +0.47 | Q |
| 3 | 2 | Linn Eriksen | Norway | 1:56.94 | +1.84 | Q |
| 4 | 12 | Lisa Unterweger | Austria | 1:59.15 | +4.05 | Q |
| 5 | 4 | Sandra Bader | Austria | 1:59.84 | +4.74 | Q |
| 6 | 13 | Nadine Fähndrich | Switzerland | 2:00.01 | +4.91 | Q |
| 7 | 14 | Alice Canclini | Italy | 2:00.11 | +5.01 | Q |
| 8 | 7 | Anamarija Lampič | Slovenia | 2:00.18 | +5.08 | Q |
| 9 | 15 | Victoria Carl | Germany | 2:01.15 | +6.05 | Q |
| 10 | 5 | Katri Lylynperä | Finland | 2:01.21 | +6.11 | Q |
| 11 | 18 | Barbora Klementová | Slovakia | 2:01.37 | +6.27 | Q |
| 12 | 11 | Leena Nurmi | Finland | 2:01.57 | +6.47 | Q |
| 13 | 10 | Anastasia Sedova | Russia | 2:01.72 | +6.62 | Q |
| 14 | 22 | Julia Belger | Germany | 2:01.96 | +6.86 | Q |
| 15 | 8 | Maya MacIsaac-Jones | Canada | 2:01.99 | +6.89 | Q |
| 16 | 40 | Ma Chun | China | 2:02.34 | +7.24 | Q |
| 17 | 16 | Petra Hynčicová | Czech Republic | 2:02.58 | +7.48 | Q |
| 18 | 1 | Alisa Zhambalova | Russia | 2:03.08 | +7.98 | Q |
| 19 | 17 | Lea Einfalt | Slovenia | 2:04.06 | +8.96 | Q |
| 20 | 39 | Yaiza Barajas | Spain | 2:04.37 | +9.27 | Q |
| 21 | 29 | Ina Lukonina | Belarus | 2:05.07 | +9.97 | Q |
| 22 | 19 | Urszula Łętocha | Poland | 2:05.81 | +10.71 | Q |
| 23 | 6 | Heather Mooney | United States | 2:06.15 | +11.05 | Q |
| 24 | 20 | Oksana Shatalova | Ukraine | 2:06.58 | +11.48 | Q |
| 25 | 21 | Sarah Hale | Great Britain | 2:06.66 | +11.56 | Q |
| 26 | 28 | Kristina Kazlauskaitė | Lithuania | 2:08.43 | +13.33 | Q |
| 27 | 27 | Simona Ungureanu | Romania | 2:08.45 | +13.35 | Q |
| 28 | 36 | Constance Vulliet | France | 2:10.67 | +15.57 | Q |
| 29 | 34 | Kozue Takizawa | Japan | 2:10.80 | +15.70 | Q |
| 30 | 37 | Kelly Vainlo | Estonia | 2:11.62 | +16.52 | Q |
| 31 | 23 | Lucy Glanville | Australia | 2:12.46 | +17.36 | |
| 32 | 26 | Alexandra Kun | Kazakhstan | 2:12.94 | +17.84 | |
| 33 | 35 | Alison Perrillat-Amede | France | 2:13.27 | +18.17 | |
| 34 | 38 | Maki Ohdaira | Japan | 2:13.94 | +18.84 | |
| 35 | 25 | Rea Raušel | Croatia | 2:15.16 | +20.06 | |
| 36 | 24 | Kameliya Ilieva | Bulgaria | 2:16.65 | +21.55 | |
| 37 | 31 | Zane Eglīte | Latvia | 2:24.79 | +29.69 | |
| 38 | 33 | Lee Yeong-ae | South Korea | 2:27.20 | +32.10 | |
| 39 | 30 | Lilit Tonoyan | Armenia | 2:28.11 | +33.01 | |
| 39 | 32 | Carlsen Caroline Ryge | Denmark | 2:28.11 | +33.01 | |

=== Quarterfinals ===
Quarterfinal 1

| Rank | Seed | Athlete | Country | Time | Deficit | Note |
|---|---|---|---|---|---|---|
| 1 | 1 | Silje Theodorsen | Norway | 1:58.9 | | Q |
| 2 | 10 | Katri Lylynperä | Finland | 1:59.4 | +0.5 | Q |
| 3 | 11 | Barbora Klementová | Slovakia | 2:01.5 | +2.6 | |
| 4 | 21 | Ina Lukonina | Belarus | 2:05.9 | +7.0 | |
| 5 | 30 | Kelly Vainlo | Estonia | 2:07.3 | +8.4 | |
| 6 | 20 | Yaiza Barajas | Spain | 2:12.6 | +13.7 | |

Quarterfinal 2

| Rank | Seed | Athlete | Country | Time | Deficit | Note |
|---|---|---|---|---|---|---|
| 1 | 17 | Petra Hynčicová | Czech Republic | 2:01.9 | | Q |
| 2 | 4 | Lisa Unterweger | Austria | 2:02.2 | +0.3 | Q |
| 3 | 7 | Alice Canclini | Italy | 2:02.4 | +0.5 | |
| 4 | 24 | Oksana Shatalova | Ukraine | 2:05.1 | +3.2 | |
| 5 | 14 | Julia Belger | Germany | 2:10.5 | +8.6 | |
| 6 | 27 | Simona Ungureanu | Romania | 2:11.3 | +9.4 | |

Quarterfinal 3

| Rank | Seed | Athlete | Country | Time | Deficit | Note |
|---|---|---|---|---|---|---|
| 1 | 15 | Maya MacIsaac-Jones | Canada | 2:01.3 | | Q |
| 2 | 6 | Nadine Fähndrich | Switzerland | 2:01.7 | +0.4 | Q |
| 3 | 25 | Sarah Hale | Great Britain | 2:06.0 | +4.7 | |
| 4 | 26 | Kristina Kazlauskaitė | Lithuania | 2:09.1 | +7.8 | |
| 5 | 16 | Ma Chun | China | 2:10.0 | +8.7 | |
| 6 | 5 | Sandra Bader | Austria | 2:29.4 | +28.1 | |

Quarterfinal 4

| Rank | Seed | Athlete | Country | Time | Deficit | Note |
|---|---|---|---|---|---|---|
| 1 | 2 | Jonna Sundling | Sweden | 1:58.0 | | Q |
| 2 | 9 | Victoria Carl | Germany | 1:59.4 | +1.4 | Q |
| 3 | 19 | Lea Einfalt | Slovenia | 1:59.4 | +1.4 | LL |
| 4 | 12 | Leena Nurmi | Finland | 2:00.7 | +2.7 | LL |
| 5 | 22 | Urszula Łętocha | Poland | 2:02.4 | +4.4 | |
| 6 | 29 | Kozue Takizawa | Japan | 2:05.6 | +7.6 | |

Quarterfinal 5

| Rank | Seed | Athlete | Country | Time | Deficit | Note |
|---|---|---|---|---|---|---|
| 1 | 8 | Anamarija Lampič | Slovenia | 2:00.6 | | Q |
| 2 | 3 | Linn Eriksen | Norway | 2:01.2 | +0.6 | Q |
| 3 | 13 | Anastasia Sedova | Russia | 2:01.5 | +0.9 | |
| 4 | 18 | Alisa Zhambalova | Russia | 2:03.0 | +2.4 | |
| 5 | 23 | Heather Mooney | United States | 2:09.6 | +9.0 | |
| 6 | 28 | Constance Vulliet | France | 2:13.5 | +12.9 | |

=== Semifinals ===
Semifinal 1

| Rank | Seed | Athlete | Country | Time | Deficit | Note |
|---|---|---|---|---|---|---|
| 1 | 1 | Silje Theodorsen | Norway | 1:57.2 | | Q |
| 2 | 10 | Katri Lylynperä | Finland | 1:57.8 | +0.6 | Q |
| 3 | 19 | Lea Einfalt | Slovenia | 2:00.2 | +3.0 | LL |
| 4 | 6 | Nadine Fähndrich | Switzerland | 2:01.1 | +3.9 | |
| 5 | 17 | Petra Hynčicová | Czech Republic | 2:01.2 | +4.0 | |
| 6 | 4 | Lisa Unterweger | Austria | 2:01.5 | +4.3 | |

Semifinal 2

| Rank | Seed | Athlete | Country | Time | Deficit | Note |
|---|---|---|---|---|---|---|
| 1 | 2 | Jonna Sundling | Sweden | 1:58.4 | | Q |
| 2 | 8 | Anamarija Lampič | Slovenia | 1:58.9 | +0.5 | Q |
| 3 | 3 | Linn Eriksen | Norway | 1:59.3 | +0.9 | LL |
| 4 | 15 | Maya MacIsaac-Jones | Canada | 2:02.4 | +4.0 | |
| 5 | 12 | Leena Nurmi | Finland | 2:03.3 | +4.9 | |
| 6 | 9 | Victoria Carl | Germany | 2:07.0 | +8.6 | |

=== Final ===
| Rank | Seed | Athlete | Country | Time | Deficit | Note |
|---|---|---|---|---|---|---|
| 1st place, gold medalist(s) | 1 | Silje Theodorsen | Norway | 1:57.4 | | |
| 2nd place, silver medalist(s) | 2 | Jonna Sundling | Sweden | 1:57.5 | +0.1 | |
| 3rd place, bronze medalist(s) | 3 | Linn Eriksen | Norway | 1:57.6 | +0.2 | |
| 4 | 8 | Anamarija Lampič | Slovenia | 1:58.9 | +1.5 | |
| 5 | 10 | Katri Lylynperä | Finland | 1:58.9 | +1.5 | |
| 6 | 19 | Lea Einfalt | Slovenia | 2:04.6 | +7.2 | |
