= Cross-country skiing at the 2012 Winter Youth Olympics – Boys' 10 kilometre classical =

Boys' 10 kilometre classical at the I Winter Youth Olympic Games
- Venue: Seefeld Arena
- Date: 17 January
- Competitors: 48 from 40 nations
- Winning time: 29:28.8

Medalists
1st place, gold medalist(s)		Alexander Selyaninov	Russia
2nd place, silver medalist(s)		Kentaro Ishikawa	Japan
3rd place, bronze medalist(s)		Sergey Malyshev	Kazakhstan

The boys' 10 kilometre classical cross-country skiing competition at the 2012 Winter Youth Olympics was held on 17 January at the Seefeld Arena.

== Results ==
The race was started at 11:45.

Rank	Bib	Athlete	Country	Time	Deficit
1st place, gold medalist(s)	37	Alexander Selyaninov	Russia	29:28.8	
2nd place, silver medalist(s)	47	Kentaro Ishikawa	Japan	29:40.2	+11.4
3rd place, bronze medalist(s)	49	Sergey Malyshev	Kazakhstan	29:57.5	+28.7
4	34	Chrisander Skjønberg Holth	Norway	30:14.1	+45.3
5	23	Joonas Sarkkinen	Finland	30:21.7	+52.9
6	33	Christian Stiebritz	Germany	30:24.0	+55.2
7	44	Miha Šimenc	Slovenia	30:30.9	+1:02.1
8	18	Andreas Veerpalu	Estonia	30:42.2	+1:13.4
9	45	Petr Knop	Czech Republic	31:02.7	+1:16.0
10	48	Marcus Ruus	Sweden	31:02.7	+1:33.9
11	46	Jason Rüesch	Switzerland	31:10.4	+1:41.6
12	35	Marius Cebulla	Germany	31:15.8	+1:47.0
13	29	Andreas Molden	Norway	31:16.3	+1:47.5
14	31	Manuel Perotti	Italy	31:22.5	+1:53.7
15	26	Dawid Bril	Poland	31:27.8	+1:59.0
16	43	Patrick Caldwell	United States	31:30.1	+2:01.3
17	25	Takuto Terabayashi	Japan	31:30.9	+2:02.1
18	40	Nikita Khabarov	Russia	31:31.2	+2:02.4
19	38	Simeon Deyanov	Bulgaria	31:35.7	+2:06.9
20	36	Oleksii Krasovskyi	Ukraine	31:53.0	+2:24.2
21	30	Thomas Chambellant	France	31:55.0	+2:26.2
22	38	Matic Slabe	Slovenia	31:55.2	+2:26.4
23	27	Richard Jouve	France	32:01.8	+2:33.0
24	20	Arnis Pētersons	Latvia	32:14.7	+2:45.9
25	24	Joona Joensuu	Finland	32:24.3	+2:55.5
26	41	Alexander Gotthalmseder	Austria	32:34.6	+3:05.8
27	39	Andrej Segeč	Slovakia	32:44.5	+3:15.7
28	21	Hamza Dursun	Turkey	32:55.5	+3:26.7
29	13	Matthew Saurette	Canada	32:55.8	+3:27.0
30	32	Florin Daniel Pripici	Romania	33:15.4	+3:46.6
31	22	Martin Vögeli	Liechtenstein	33:20.5	+3:51.7
32	19	Krešimir Crnković	Croatia	33:27.4	+3:58.6
33	12	Jaunius Drūsys	Lithuania	33:46.3	+4:17.5
34	42	Johannes Fabian Kattnig	Austria	33:57.6	+4:28.8
35	14	Maksim Hardzias	Belarus	34:00.4	+4:31.6
36	15	Adrian Clavero	Spain	34:52.2	+5:23.4
37	17	Scott Dixon	Great Britain	35:02.2	+5:33.4
38	7	Gunnar Birgisson	Iceland	35:06.8	+5:38.0
39	16	Goran Košarac	Bosnia and Herzegovina	35:49.1	+6:20.3
40	6	Ji Won	South Korea	36:24.0	+6:55.2
41	10	Yaghoob Kiashemshaki	Iran	37:14.4	+7:45.6
42	1	Dandar Usukhbayar	Mongolia	37:16.0	+7:47.2
43	5	Zénó Bodnár	Hungary	37:22.3	+7:53.5
44	8	Alex Gibson	Australia	38:20.4	+8:51.6
45	9	Hrachik Sahakyan	Armenia	38:25.7	+8:56.9
46	4	Zafar Shakhmuratov	Kyrgyzstan	39:07.1	+9:38.3
47	3	Alejo Hlopec	Argentina	40:33.8	+11:05.0
48	11	Dimitrios Kyriazis	Greece	40:40.8	+11:12.0
	2	Eirik Stonor	Denmark	Did not start	
