= Cross-country skiing at the 2012 Winter Youth Olympics – Boys' sprint =

Boys' sprint at the I Winter Youth Olympic Games
- Venue: Seefeld Arena
- Date: 19 January
- Competitors: 50 from 42 nations
- Winning time: 1:44.1

Medalists
1st place, gold medalist(s)		Andreas Molden	Norway
2nd place, silver medalist(s)		Marius Cebulla	Germany
3rd place, bronze medalist(s)		Alexander Selyaninov	Russia

The boys' sprint freestyle cross-country skiing competition at the 2012 Winter Youth Olympics was held on 19 January at the Seefeld Arena.

== Results ==
=== Qualification ===
The qualification was held at 16:00.

Rank	Bib	Athlete	Country	Time	Deficit	Notes
1	9	Andreas Molden	Norway	1:42.08		Q
2	14	Nikita Khabarov	Russia	1:43.52	+1.44	Q
3	7	Chrisander Skjønberg Holth	Norway	1:43.60	+1.52	Q
4	2	Alexander Selyaninov	Russia	1:43.93	+1.85	Q
5	6	Marius Cebulla	Germany	1:44.85	+2.77	Q
6	10	Christian Stiebritz	Germany	1:45.17	+3.09	Q
7	1	Kentaro Ishikawa	Japan	1:45.61	+3.53	Q
8	15	Jason Rüesch	Switzerland	1:45.81	+3.73	Q
9	23	Johannes Fabian Kattnig	Austria	1:46.16	+4.08	Q
10	12	Joona Joensuu	Finland	1:46.44	+4.36	Q
11	5	Dawid Bril	Poland	1:46.47	+4.39	Q
12	4	Sergey Malyshev	Kazakhstan	1:46.77	+4.69	Q
13	3	Marcus Ruus	Sweden	1:46.91	+4.83	Q
14	11	Simeon Deyanov	Bulgaria	1:46.96	+4.88	Q
15	8	Andrej Segeč	Slovakia	1:47.23	+5.15	Q
16	24	Maksim Hardzias	Belarus	1:47.28	+5.20	Q
17	26	Manuel Perotti	Italy	1:47.36	+5.28	Q
18	16	Patrick Caldwell	United States	1:47.63	+5.55	Q
19	17	Joonas Sarkkinen	Finland	1:47.75	+5.67	Q
20	13	Andreas Veerpalu	Estonia	1:47.87	+5.79	Q
21	18	Miha Šimenc	Slovenia	1:48.15	+6.07	Q
22	25	Florin Daniel Pripici	Romania	1:48.54	+6.46	Q
23	32	Matthew Saurette	Canada	1:49.26	+7.18	Q
24	42	Thomas Chambellant	France	1:49.45	+7.37	Q
25	29	Hamza Dursun	Turkey	1:49.46	+7.38	Q
26	21	Arnis Pētersons	Latvia	1:49.62	+7.54	Q
27	19	Alexander Gotthalmseder	Austria	1:49.96	+7.88	Q
28	43	Richard Jouve	France	1:50.07	+7.99	Q
29	20	Petr Knop	Czech Republic	1:50.18	+8.10	Q
30	22	Oleksii Krasovskyi	Ukraine	1:50.43	+8.35	Q
31	47	Adrian Clavero	Spain	1:51.80	+9.72	
32	44	Takuto Terabayashi	Japan	1:51.89	+9.81	
33	46	Scott Dixon	Great Britain	1:52.40	+10.32	
34	37	Zénó Bodnár	Hungary	1:53.69	+11.61	
35	45	Krešimir Crnković	Croatia	1:54.08	+12.00	
36	48	Jaunius Drūsys	Lithuania	1:54.24	+12.16	
37	28	Matic Slabe	Slovenia	1:54.56	+12.48	
38	30	Goran Košarac	Bosnia and Herzegovina	1:56.05	+13.97	
39	31	Martin Vögeli	Liechtenstein	1:56.31	+14.23	
40	27	Alex Gibson	Australia	1:56.49	+14.41	
41	38	Gunnar Birgisson	Iceland	1:57.66	+15.58	
42	34	Dimitrios Kyriazis	Greece	2:00.22	+18.14	
43	33	Zafar Shakhmuratov	Kyrgyzstan	2:01.09	+19.01	
44	35	Eirik Stonor	Denmark	2:01.59	+19.51	
45	36	Hrachik Sahakyan	Armenia	2:02.56	+20.48	
46	49	Ji Won	South Korea	2:06.30	+24.22	
47	39	Alejo Hlopec	Argentina	2:09.30	+27.22	
48	41	Dandar Usukhbayar	Mongolia	2:09.87	+27.79	
49	40	Yaghoob Kiashemshaki	Iran	2:10.72	+28.64	
50	50	Velko Lozanoski	Macedonia	2:35.39	+53.31	

=== Quarterfinals ===
Quarterfinal 1

Rank	Seed	Athlete	Country	Time	Deficit	Note
1	1	Andreas Molden	Norway	1:46.3		Q
2	21	Miha Šimenc	Slovenia	1:46.9	+0.3	Q
3	20	Andreas Veerpalu	Estonia	1:48.0	+1.7	
4	10	Joona Joensuu	Finland	1:49.4	+3.1	
5	30	Oleksii Krasovskyi	Ukraine	1:49.8	+3.5	
6	11	Dawid Bril	Poland	2:11.2	+24.9	

Quarterfinal 2

Rank	Seed	Athlete	Country	Time	Deficit	Note
1	7	Kentaro Ishikawa	Japan	1:48.8		Q
2	4	Alexander Selyaninov	Russia	1:49.5	+0.7	Q
3	14	Simeon Deyanov	Bulgaria	1:50.9	+2.1	
4	24	Thomas Chambellant	France	1:51.7	+2.9	
5	27	Alexander Gotthalmseder	Austria	1:52.2	+3.4	
6	17	Manuel Perotti	Italy	2:03.2	+14.4	

Quarterfinal 3

Rank	Seed	Athlete	Country	Time	Deficit	Note
1	5	Marius Cebulla	Germany	1:48.6		Q
2	6	Christian Stiebritz	Germany	1:49.4	+0.9	Q
3	15	Andrej Segeč	Slovakia	1:50.0	+1.4	
4	26	Arnis Pētersons	Latvia	1:50.1	+1.5	
5	16	Maksim Hardzias	Belarus	1:50.2	+1.6	
6	25	Hamza Dursun	Turkey	2:30.2	+41.6	

Quarterfinal 4

Rank	Seed	Athlete	Country	Time	Deficit	Note
1	9	Johannes Fabian Kattnig	Austria	1:48.2		Q
2	12	Sergey Malyshev	Kazakhstan	1:49.2	+1.0	Q
3	29	Petr Knop	Czech Republic	1:50.6	+2.4	
4	19	Joonas Sarkkinen	Finland	1:51.6	+3.4	
5	2	Nikita Khabarov	Russia	1:51.9	+3.7	
6	22	Florin Daniel Pripici	Romania	1:54.4	+6.2	

Quarterfinal 5

Rank	Seed	Athlete	Country	Time	Deficit	Note
1	13	Marcus Ruus	Sweden	1:45.4		Q
2	8	Jason Rüesch	Switzerland	1:46.1	+0.7	Q
3	3	Chrisander Skjønberg Holth	Norway	1:46.1	+0.7	LL
4	18	Patrick Caldwell	United States	1:46.5	+1.1	LL
5	28	Richard Jouve	France	1:47.5	+2.1	
6	23	Matthew Saurette	Canada	1:48.4	+3.0	

=== Semifinals ===
Semifinal 1

Rank	Seed	Athlete	Country	Time	Deficit	Note
1	1	Andreas Molden	Norway	1:46.0		Q
2	7	Kentaro Ishikawa	Japan	1:46.2	+0.2	Q
3	4	Alexander Selyaninov	Russia	1:46.8	+0.8	LL
4	3	Chrisander Skjønberg Holth	Norway	1:48.6	+2.6	
5	6	Christian Stiebritz	Germany	2:00.1	+14.1	
6	21	Miha Šimenc	Slovenia	2:04.0	+18.0	

Semifinal 2

Rank	Seed	Athlete	Country	Time	Deficit	Note
1	5	Marius Cebulla	Germany	1:46.1		Q
2	13	Marcus Ruus	Sweden	1:46.7	+0.6	Q
3	18	Patrick Caldwell	United States	1:47.3	+1.2	LL
4	12	Sergey Malyshev	Kazakhstan	1:57.2	+11.1	
5	8	Jason Rüesch	Switzerland	1:58.2	+12.1	
6	9	Johannes Fabian Kattnig	Austria	5:28.0	+3:41.9	

=== Final ===
Rank	Seed	Athlete	Country	Time	Deficit	Note
1st place, gold medalist(s)	1	Andreas Molden	Norway	1:44.1		
2nd place, silver medalist(s)	5	Marius Cebulla	Germany	1:44.8	+0.7	
3rd place, bronze medalist(s)	4	Alexander Selyaninov	Russia	1:45.1	+1.0	
4	13	Marcus Ruus	Sweden	1:46.2	+2.1	
5	18	Patrick Caldwell	United States	1:47.0	+2.9	
6	7	Kentaro Ishikawa	Japan	1:49.9	+5.8	
