= Biathlon at the 2012 Winter Youth Olympics – Girls' sprint =

Girls' sprint at the I Winter Youth Olympic Games
- Venue: Seefeld Arena
- Date: January 15
- Competitors: 48 from 27 nations

Medalists
1st place, gold medalist(s)		Franziska Preuß	Germany
2nd place, silver medalist(s)		Galina Vishnevskaya	Kazakhstan
3rd place, bronze medalist(s)		Uliana Kaysheva	Russia

The girls' sprint competition of the biathlon events at the 2012 Winter Youth Olympics in Innsbruck, Austria, was held on January 15, at Seefeld Arena. 48 athletes from 27 nations took part in this event. The race was 6 km in length.

== Results ==
The race was started at 13:15.

Rank	Bib	Name	Country	Time	Penalties (P+S)	Deficit
1st place, gold medalist(s)	46	Franziska Preuß	Germany	17:27.7	1 (0+1)	–
2nd place, silver medalist(s)	45	Galina Vishnevskaya	Kazakhstan	17:55.2	2 (1+1)	+27.5
3rd place, bronze medalist(s)	20	Uliana Kaisheva	Russia	18:00.9	2 (1+1)	+33.2
4	48	Lotten Sjödén	Sweden	18:08.6	1 (1+0)	+40.9
5	39	Natalya Gerbulova	Russia	18:14.5	1 (1+0)	+46.8
6	28	Jessica Jislová	Czech Republic	18:19.5	0 (0+0)	+51.8
7	42	Julia Reisinger	Austria	18:24.0	1 (1+0)	+56.3
8	32	Lisa Vittozzi	Italy	18:42.8	1 (1+0)	+1:15.1
9	25	Danielle Vrielink	Canada	18:45.9	1 (1+0)	+1:18.2
10	10	Ivona Fialková	Slovakia	18:47.2	1 (0+1)	+1:19.5
11	34	Kristin Sandeggen	Norway	18:55.5	1 (0+1)	+1:27.8
12	29	Chloé Chevalier	France	18:55.8	3 (1+2)	+1:28.1
13	38	Anna Kubek	United States	18:56.7	1 (0+1)	+1:29.0
14	15	Anastasiya Merkushyna	Ukraine	19:01.7	3 (2+1)	+1:34.0
15	11	Léa Ducordeau	France	19:13.6	2 (2+0)	+1:45.9
16	14	Erika Jislová	Czech Republic	19:18.4	1 (1+0)	+1:50.7
17	44	Song Na	China	19:19.2	2 (2+0)	+1:51.5
18	37	Yuliya Zhuravok	Ukraine	19:23.1	2 (2+0)	+1:55.4
19	6	Linn Persson	Sweden	19:29.3	1 (1+0)	+2:01.6
20	16	Aita Gasparin	Switzerland	19:33.4	3 (2+1)	+2:05.7
21	18	Meril Beilmann	Estonia	19:46.6	3 (0+3)	+2:18.9
22	1	Sarah Beaudry	Canada	19:49.9	4 (2+2)	+2:22.2
23	21	Zhang Zhaohan	China	19:51.1	4 (1+3)	+2:23.4
24	41	Kinga Mitoraj	Poland	19:58.2	3 (0+3)	+2:30.5
25	36	Maarja Maranik	Estonia	19:58.7	3 (2+1)	+2:31.0
26	43	Liudmila Kiaura	Belarus	20:02.4	2 (0+2)	+2:34.7
27	17	Tatsiana Tryfanava	Belarus	20:15.0	2 (1+1)	+2:47.3
28	4	Eva Urevc	Slovenia	20:15.8	6 (2+4)	+2:48.1
29	2	Anna Savin	Italy	20:20.3	3 (2+1)	+2:52.6
30	31	Jenny Ingman	Finland	20:24.6	3 (1+2)	+2:56.9
31	5	Erika Janka	Finland	20:28.8	1 (1+0)	+3:01.1
32	24	Anastassiya Kondratyeva	Kazakhstan	20:36.4	3 (3+0)	+3:08.7
33	27	Iulia Ioana Ţigani	Romania	20:52.2	2 (0+2)	+3:24.5
34	19	Beata Lassak	Poland	20:56.1	4 (2+2)	+3:28.4
35	8	Jang Ji-yeon	South Korea	21:08.4	2 (0+2)	+3:40.7
36	13	Karoline Næss	Norway	21:10.6	5 (1+4)	+3:42.9
37	12	Laura Hengelhaupt	Germany	21:18.8	5 (1+4)	+3:51.1
38	35	Daniela Kadeva	Bulgaria	21:19.7	2 (1+1)	+3:52.0
39	23	Aleksandra Zakrzewska	United States	21:21.8	4 (1+3)	+3:54.1
40	9	Mariela Georgieva	Bulgaria	21:48.0	5 (2+3)	+4:20.3
41	33	Anthea Grum	Slovenia	21:51.7	6 (3+3)	+4:24.0
42	40	Nikola Lapinová	Slovakia	21:57.3	5 (2+3)	+4:29.6
43	3	Dorottya Búzás	Romania	22:25.9	5 (3+2)	+4:58.2
44	26	Gaudvilė Nalivaikaitė	Lithuania	22:40.7	5 (2+3)	+5:13.0
45	22	Olivia Thomson	New Zealand	23:41.4	1 (0+1)	+6:13.7
46	7	Irina Cozonac	Moldova	25:17.2	3 (3+0)	+7:49.5
47	30	Gunita Gaile	Latvia	27:09.1	6 (3+3)	+9:41.4
	47	Zhenya Grigoryan	Armenia	DNF		
