= Luge at the 2012 Winter Youth Olympics – Team relay =

Team relay at the I Winter Youth Olympic Games
- Venue: Olympic Sliding Centre Innsbruck
- Dates: 17 January
- Competitors: 44 from 11 nations
- Winning time: 2:18.310

Medalists
1st place, gold medalist(s)		Summer Britcher; Tucker West; Ty Andersen; Pat Edmunds	United States
2nd place, silver medalist(s)		Saskia Langer; Christian Paffe; Tim Brendl; Florian Funk	Germany
3rd place, bronze medalist(s)		Miriam Kastlunger; Armin Frauscher; Thomas Steu; Lorenz Koller	Austria

The team relay luge at the 2012 Winter Youth Olympics took place on 17 January at the Olympic Sliding Centre Innsbruck.

== Results ==
The event was started at 14:00

Rank	Bib	Athlete	Country	Girls' singles	Boys' singles	Doubles	Total	Behind
1st place, gold medalist(s)	8	Summer Britcher; Tucker West; Ty Andersen / Pat Edmunds	United States	44.658	46.686	46.966	2:18.310	
2nd place, silver medalist(s)	9	Saskia Langer; Christian Paffe; Tim Brendl / Florian Funk	Germany	44.788	46.766	47.154	2:18.708	+0.398
3rd place, bronze medalist(s)	7	Miriam Kastlunger; Armin Frauscher; Thomas Steu / Lorenz Koller	Austria	44.676	46.902	47.285	2:18.863	+0.553
4	10	Victoria Demchenko; Alexander Stepichev; Yury Kalinin / Sergey Belyayev	Russia	45.336	46.911	47.434	2:19.681	+1.371
5	5	Andrea Vötter; Daniel Gatterer; Florian Gruber / Simon Kainzwaldner	Italy	44.932	47.943	46.982	2:19.857	+1.547
6	11	Ulla Zirne; Riks Rozītis; Kristens Putins / Imants Marcinkēvičs	Latvia	44.742	48.197	47.184	2:20.123	+1.813
7	6	Olena Stetskiv; Anton Dukach; Volodymyr Buryy / Anatolii Lehedza	Ukraine	45.556	46.852	47.781	2:20.189	+1.879
8	3	Darya Kudryavtseva; Sergey Korzhnev; Stanislav Maltsev / Oleg Faskhutdinov	Kazakhstan	45.752	47.401	47.843	2:20.996	+2.686
9	4	Nikola Drajnová; Jozef Petrulák; Jozef Čikovský / Patrik Tomaško	Slovakia	45.969	47.911	47.396	2:21.276	+2.966
10	1	Natalia Biesiadzka; Jakub Kowalewski; Jakub Firlej / Mateusz Woźniak	Poland	45.549	48.192	48.172	2:21.913	+3.603
11	2	Ana Maria Şovăială; Daniel Popa; Cosmin Atodiresei / Ștefan Musei	Romania	45.821	49.340	48.150	2:23.311	+5.001
