= Germany at the 2012 Winter Youth Olympics =

- IOC code: GER
- NOC: Deutscher Olympischer Sportbund
- Website: www.dosb.de

in Innsbruck
- Competitors: 57 in 15 sports
- Flag bearer: Katharina Althaus
- Medals Ranked 1st: Gold 8 Silver 7 Bronze 2 Total 17

Winter Youth Olympics appearances
- 2012; 2016; 2020; 2024

Germany competed at the 2012 Winter Youth Olympics in Innsbruck, Austria. The German team consisted of 57 athletes competing in 15 different sports.

== Medalists ==
Medal	Name	Sport	Event	Date
Gold	Franziska Preuß	Biathlon	Girls' sprint	15 Jan
Gold	Christian Paffe	Luge	Boys' singles	15 Jan
Gold	Niklas Homberg	Biathlon	Boys' Pursuit	16 Jan
Gold	Franziska Preuß; Laura Hengelhaupt; Maximilian Janke; Niklas Homberg	Biathlon	Mixed Relay	19 Jan
Gold	Franziska Preuß; Victoria Carl; Maximilian Janke; Christian Stiebritz	Biathlon; Cross-country Skiing	CC Skiing Biathlon Relay	21 Jan
Gold	Sebastian Berneker	Skeleton	Boys' individual	21 Jan
Gold	Jacqueline Lölling	Skeleton	Girls' individual	21 Jan
Gold	Katharina Althaus; Tom Lubitz; Andreas Wellinger	Ski Jumping	Mixed Team	21 Jan
Silver	Katharina Althaus	Ski jumping	Girls' individual	14 Jan
Silver	Franziska Preuß	Biathlon	Girls' Pursuit	16 Jan
Silver	Tim Brendel; Florian Funk	Luge	Boys' doubles	16 Jan
Silver	Saskia Langer	Luge	Girls' singles	16 Jan
Silver	Saskia Langer; Christian Paffe; Tim Brendel; Florian Funk	Luge	Mixed Team Relay	17 Jan
Silver	Marius Cebulla	Cross-country Skiing	Boys' Sprint	19 Jan
Silver	Marzellus Renn	Freestyle Skiing	Boys' ski cross	21 Jan
Bronze	Toni Gräfe	Luge	Boys' singles	15 Jan
Bronze	Germany	Ice hockey	Girls' competition	22 Jan

== Alpine skiing ==
Boys

Athlete	Event	Final			
Athlete	Event	Run 1	Run 2	Total	Rank
Nikolaus Ertl	Slalom	40.68	40.44	1:21.12	6
Nikolaus Ertl	Giant slalom	1:00.43	54.70	1:55.13	8
Nikolaus Ertl	Super-G			DSQ	
Nikolaus Ertl	Combined	1:05.64	38.98	1:44.62	14
Lucas Krahnert	Slalom	40.53	40.74	1:21.27	7
Lucas Krahnert	Giant slalom	DNF			
Lucas Krahnert	Super-G			1:04.84	5
Lucas Krahnert	Combined	1:03.96	45.85	1:49.81	23

Girls

Athlete	Event	Final			
Athlete	Event	Run 1	Run 2	Total	Rank
Alisa Krauss	Slalom	DNF			
Alisa Krauss	Giant slalom	1:00.13	59.84	1:59.97	14
Alisa Krauss	Super-G			DNF	
Alisa Krauss	Combined	DNF			
Jenny Reinold	Slalom	43.90	DNF		
Jenny Reinold	Giant slalom	1:00.73	1:00.54	2:01.27	18
Jenny Reinold	Super-G			1:07.42	15
Jenny Reinold	Combined	DNF			

Team

Athlete	Event	Quarterfinals	Semifinals	Final	Rank
Alisa Krauss; Nikolaus Ertl; Jenny Reinold; Lucas Krahnert	Parallel mixed team	Italy; L 0-3	did not advance		5

== Biathlon ==
Boys

Athlete	Event	Final		
Athlete	Event	Time	Misses	Rank
Niklas Homberg	Sprint	20:05.4	1	6
Niklas Homberg	Pursuit	28:43.1	4	1st place, gold medalist(s)
Maximilian Janke	Sprint	20:57.8	2	14
Maximilian Janke	Pursuit	29:41.6	4	4

Girls

Athlete	Event	Final		
Athlete	Event	Time	Misses	Rank
Laura Hengelhaupt	Sprint	21:18.8	5	37
Laura Hengelhaupt	Pursuit	33:21.4	6	22
Franziska Preuß	Sprint	17:27.7	1	1st place, gold medalist(s)
Franziska Preuß	Pursuit	26:29.2	2	2nd place, silver medalist(s)

Mixed

Athlete	Event	Final		
Athlete	Event	Time	Misses	Rank
Franziska Preuß; Laura Hengelhaupt; Maximilian Janke; Niklas Homberg	Mixed relay	1:11:06.8	0+7	1st place, gold medalist(s)
Franziska Preuß; Victoria Carl; Maximilian Janke; Christian Stiebritz	Cross-Country-Biathlon Mixed Relay	1:04:23.4	1+6	1st place, gold medalist(s)

== Bobsleigh ==
Boys

Athlete	Event	Final			
Athlete	Event	Run 1	Run 2	Total	Rank
Philipp Mölter; Richard Oelsner	Two-Boys	54.93	54.49	1:49.42	6

== Cross country skiing ==
Boys

Athlete	Event	Final	
Athlete	Event	Time	Rank
Marius Cebulla	10km classical	31:15.8	12
Christian Stiebritz	10km classical	30:24.0	6

Girls

Athlete	Event	Final	
Athlete	Event	Time	Rank
Julia Belger	5km classical	15:32.5	7
Victoria Carl	5km classical	15:20.9	6

Sprint

Athlete	Event	Qualification		Quarterfinal		Semifinal		Final	
Athlete	Event	Total	Rank	Total	Rank	Total	Rank	Total	Rank
Marius Cebulla	Boys' sprint	1:44.85	5 Q	1:48.6	1 Q	1:46.1	1 Q	1:44.8	2nd place, silver medalist(s)
Christian Stiebritz	Boys' sprint	1:45.17	6 Q	1:49.4	2 Q	2:00.1	5	did not advance	
Julia Belger	Girls' sprint	2:01.96	14 Q	2:10.7	5	did not advance			
Victoria Carl	Girls' sprint	2:01.15	9 Q	1:59.4	2 Q	2:07.0	6	did not advance	

Mixed

Athlete	Event	Final		
Athlete	Event	Time	Misses	Rank
Franziska Preuß; Victoria Carl; Maximilian Janke; Christian Stiebritz	Cross-Country-Biathlon Mixed Relay	1:04:23.4	1+6	1st place, gold medalist(s)

== Curling ==
Boys

- Skip: Daniel Rothballer
- Second: Kevin Lehmann

Girls

- Third: Frederike Manner
- Lead: Nicole Muskatewitz

=== Mixed Team ===
Final Round Robin Standings

Red Group	Skip	W	L
Sweden	Rasmus Wranå	6	1
Canada	Thomas Scoffin	5	2
Japan	Shingo Usui	4	3
Italy	Amos Mosaner	4	3
Great Britain	Duncan Menzies	3	4
Russia	Mikhail Vaskov	3	4
Austria	Mathias Genner	2	5
Germany	Daniel Rothballer	1	6

==== Round-robin results ====
Draw 1

Sheet C	1	2	3	4	5	6	7	8	Final
Germany (Rothballer) 🔨	2	1	0	0	0	0	1	0	4
Canada (Scoffin)	0	0	2	1	0	2	0	1	6

Draw 2

Sheet D	1	2	3	4	5	6	7	8	Final
Russia (Vaskov) 🔨	0	1	0	3	1	0	1	0	6
Germany (Rothballer)	0	0	2	0	0	1	0	1	4

Draw 3

Sheet A	1	2	3	4	5	6	7	8	9	Final
Great Britain (Menzies)	0	0	2	0	1	0	0	1	0	4
Germany (Rothballer) 🔨	0	1	0	1	0	2	0	0	1	5

Draw 4

Sheet B	1	2	3	4	5	6	7	8	9	Final
Austria (Genner) 🔨	0	2	0	0	0	2	0	1	7	12
Germany (Rothballer)	0	0	1	2	1	0	1	0	0	5

Draw 5

Sheet D	1	2	3	4	5	6	7	8	Final
Germany (Rothballer)	0	0	2	0	1	0	0	X	3
Italy (Mosaner) 🔨	2	1	0	1	0	1	4	X	9

Draw 6

Sheet C	1	2	3	4	5	6	7	8	Final
Japan (Usui)	0	0	3	3	2	1	X	X	9
Germany (Rothballer) 🔨	1	1	0	0	0	0	X	X	2

Draw 7

Sheet B	1	2	3	4	5	6	7	8	Final
Germany (Rothballer) 🔨	1	1	0	1	0	1	0	X	4
Sweden (Wranå)	0	0	2	0	2	0	2	X	6

=== Mixed doubles ===
==== Round of 32 ====
Sheet A	1	2	3	4	5	6	7	8	Final
Michael Brunner (SUI); Nicole Muskatewitz (GER) 🔨	0	2	0	2	0	2	1	1	8
Sarah Anderson (USA); Go Ke-on (KOR)	1	0	4	0	1	0	0	0	6

Sheet D	1	2	3	4	5	6	7	8	Final
Kang Sue-yeon (KOR); Krystof Krupanský (CZE) 🔨	3	1	0	3	0	2	1	X	10
Daniel Rothballer (GER); Arianna Losano (ITA)	0	0	2	0	3	0	0	X	5

Sheet B	1	2	3	4	5	6	7	8	Final
Martin Sesaker (NOR); Kim Eun-bi (KOR)	1	0	4	0	2	2	0	X	9
Amalia Rudström (SWE); Kevin Lehmann (GER) 🔨	0	1	0	1	0	0	1	X	3

Sheet C	1	2	3	4	5	6	7	8	Final
Frederike Manner (GER); Derek Oryniak (CAN)	0	0	0	1	0	0	X	X	1
Yoo Min-hyeon (KOR); Mako Tamakuma (JPN) 🔨	3	2	3	0	5	1	X	X	14

==== Round of 16 ====
Sheet C	1	2	3	4	5	6	7	8	Final
Michael Brunner (SUI); Nicole Muskatewitz (GER) 🔨	1	1	1	1	1	0	1	X	6
Wang Jinbo (CHN); Ina Roll Backe (NOR)	0	0	0	0	0	1	0	X	1

==== Quarterfinals ====
Sheet B	1	2	3	4	5	6	7	8	Final
Michael Brunner (SUI); Nicole Muskatewitz (GER)	0	0	1	2	1	0	3	1	8
Mikhail Vaskov (RUS); Zuzana Hrůzová (CZE) 🔨	1	1	0	0	0	1	0	0	3

==== Semifinals ====
Sheet A	1	2	3	4	5	6	7	8	Final
Michael Brunner (SUI); Nicole Muskatewitz (GER)	1	1	0	2	0	3	0	X	7
Korey Dropkin (USA); Marina Verenich (RUS) 🔨	0	0	1	0	1	0	1	X	3

==== Gold Medal Game ====
Sheet C	1	2	3	4	5	6	7	8	Final
Michael Brunner (SUI); Nicole Muskatewitz (GER) 🔨	3	2	0	4	0	4	X	X	13
Martin Sesaker (NOR); Kim Eun-bi (KOR)	0	0	1	0	1	0	X	X	2

== Figure skating ==
Boys

Athlete(s)	Event	SP/OD		FS/FD		Total	
Athlete(s)	Event	Points	Rank	Points	Rank	Points	Rank
Niko Ulanovsky	Singles	54.03	4	104.44	6	158.47	5

== Freestyle skiing ==
Ski Cross

Athlete	Event	Qualifying		1/4 finals	Semifinals	Final
Athlete	Event	Time	Rank	Rank	Rank	Rank
Marzellus Renn	Boys' ski cross	56.96	2nd place, silver medalist(s)	Cancelled		
Katharina Tordi	Girls' ski cross	1:00.82	6	Cancelled		

Ski Half-Pipe

Athlete	Event	Qualifying		Final	
Athlete	Event	Points	Rank	Points	Rank
Lucas Mangold	Boys' ski half-pipe	61.50	9 Q	46.75	12

== Ice hockey ==
Girls

- Anna Fiegert
- Theresa Fritz
- Lucie Geelhaar
- Melanie Häringer
- Simone Hase
- Theresia Hoppe
- Viola Hotter
- Nina Korff
- Meike Krimphove
- Katharina Oertel
- Valerie Offermann
- Maylina Schrul
- Saskia Selzer
- Pia Szawlowski
- Lena Walz
- Carolin Welsch
- Johanna Winter

Legend
Advance to the Semifinals

Group A

Team	GP	W	OTW	OTL	L	GF	GA	Diff	PTS
Sweden	4	4	0	0	0	43	0	+43	12
Austria	4	3	0	0	1	22	6	+16	9
Germany	4	2	0	0	2	12	16	-4	6
Kazakhstan	4	1	0	0	3	3	28	-25	3
Slovakia	4	0	0	0	4	1	31	-30	0

January 13, 2012; 12:30	Germany	0–11 (0-3, 0-4, 0-4)	Sweden	Tyrolean Ice Arena; Attendance: 263

Game reference

Meike Krimphove
Goalies
Sara Besseling
Referee:
(United States) Ceci Morris
Linesmen:
(Finland) Taru Tanhua
(Denmark) Trine Viskum

0–1	0:56 – K. Andersson (M. Wong)
0–2	4:32 – K. Andersson (J. Eidensten, M. Wong)
0–3	12:41 – M. Andersson (L. Peterson, C. Lillback)
0–4	16:15 – K. Andersson (J. Eidensten, M. Wong)
0–5	21:56 – L. Peterson (C. Lillback, L. Backlin) (PP)
0–6	28:00 – L. Peterson (M. Andersson, A. Lindberg)
0–7	29:50 – L. Peterson (C. Lillback, L. Backlin)
0–8	32:40 – A. Lindberg (M. Andersson, C. Lillback)
0–9	35:21 – A. Lindberg (L. Backlin)
0–10	39:30 – E. Alasalmi (L. Peterson)
0–11	41:09 – J. Eidensten (A. Kjellbin)

6 min
Penalties
8 min
14
Shots
45

January 15, 2012; 11:15	Slovakia	0–8 (0–4, 0–1, 0–3)	Germany	Tyrolean Ice Arena; Attendance: 286

Game reference

Nikola Kaliska
Goalies
Viola Hotter
Referee:
(United States) Ceci Morris
Linesmen:
(China) HUI Wang
(Denmark) Trine Viskum

0–1	7:59 – V. Offermann
0–2	9:19 – V. Offermann (P. Szawlowski)
0–3	11:02 – P. Szawlowski (L. Geelhaar, A. Fiegert)
0–4	12:57 – V. Offermann (L. Geelhaar, T. Fritz) (SH)
0–5	24:25 – S. Selzer (K. Oertel, A. Fiegert) (SH)
0–6	30:46 – A. Fiegert (V. Offermann) (SH)
0–7	41:38 – A. Fiegert (V. Offermann)
0–8	43:03 – N. Korff (T. Hoppe, J. Winter) (PP)

4 min
Penalties
8 min
3
Shots
66

January 16, 2012; 10:30	Germany	2–5 (2–2, 0–1, 0–2)	Austria	Tyrolean Ice Arena; Attendance: 475

Game reference

Viola Hotter
Goalies
Paula Camilla Marchhart
Referee:
(Canada) Meghan Mallette
Linesmen:
(Czech Republic) Nikola Dvorakova
(Finland) Taru Tanhua

	0–1	6:02 – V. Hummel (J. Willenshofer)
V. Offermann (P. Szawlowski) – 8:34	1–1
	1–2	10:51 – J. Willenshofer (A. Meixner) (SH)
P. Szawlowski (V. Offermann) (PP) – 14:31	2–2
	2–3	15:59 – T. Grascher (A. Meixner)
	2–4	31:01 – J. Willenshofer (J. Frick)
	2–5	33:34 – V. Hummel (T. Grascher)

2 min
Penalties
4 min
31
Shots
20

January 18, 2012; 14:00	Kazakhstan	0–2 (0–1, 0–1, 0–0)	Germany	Tyrolean Ice Arena; Attendance: 371

Game reference
Anastassiya Ogay	Goalies	Meike Krimphove	Referee: (Slovakia) Zuzana Findurova; Linesmen: (Italy) Mirjam Gruber (Finland) Taru Tanhua
0–1 / 13:44 – L. Geelhaar (P. Szawlowski); 0–2 / 29:57 – V. Offermann (P. Szawlowski) (SH)			Referee: (Slovakia) Zuzana Findurova; Linesmen: (Italy) Mirjam Gruber (Finland) Taru Tanhua
8 min	Penalties	6 min	Referee: (Slovakia) Zuzana Findurova; Linesmen: (Italy) Mirjam Gruber (Finland) Taru Tanhua
8	Shots	34	Referee: (Slovakia) Zuzana Findurova; Linesmen: (Italy) Mirjam Gruber (Finland) Taru Tanhua

=== Semifinals ===
January 20, 2012; 16:30	Austria	2–0 (0–0, 2–0, 0–0)	Germany	Tyrolean Ice Arena; Attendance: 1,311

Game reference
Paula Camilla Marchhart	Goalies	Meike Krimphove	Referee: (Canada) Meghan Mallette; Linesmen: (Italy) Mirjam Gruber (Finland) Taru Tanhua
A. Meixner (A. List) – 18:17 / 1–0; A. Meixner (V. Hummel) (PP) – 27:06 / 2–0			Referee: (Canada) Meghan Mallette; Linesmen: (Italy) Mirjam Gruber (Finland) Taru Tanhua
8 min	Penalties	6 min	Referee: (Canada) Meghan Mallette; Linesmen: (Italy) Mirjam Gruber (Finland) Taru Tanhua
12	Shots	22	Referee: (Canada) Meghan Mallette; Linesmen: (Italy) Mirjam Gruber (Finland) Taru Tanhua

=== Bronze medal game ===
January 21, 2012; 12:30	Germany	7–4 (2–1, 3–1, 2–2)	Kazakhstan	Tyrolean Ice Arena; Attendance: 789

Game reference

Meike Krimphove
Goalies
Anastassiya Ogay
Referee:
(Slovakia) Zuzana Findurova
Linesmen:
(Italy) Mirjam Gruber
(China) HUI Wang

K. Oertel (P. Szawlowski) (PP) – 8:42	1–0
L. Walz (L. Geelhaar) – 12:21	2–0
	2–1	14:18 – S. Urpekbayeva (M. Ryspek)
	2–2	16:18 – M. Ryspek (PP)
V. Offermann (A. Fiegert) – 17:20	3–2
L. Geelhaar (A. Fiegert) (PP) – 20:21	4–2
K. Oertel (P. Szawlowski) (PP) – 28:16	5–2
	5–3	31:56 – M. Ryspek (S. Urpekbayeva)
V. Offermann – 38:35	6–3
V. Offermann (SH) – 40:17	7–3
	7–4	41:57 – N. Assimova

10 min
Penalties
8 min
50
Shots
9

Final rank: (bronze)

== Luge ==
Boys

Athlete	Event	Final			
Athlete	Event	Run 1	Run 2	Total	Rank
Toni Gräfe	Boys' singles	39.982	39.938	1:19.920	3rd place, bronze medalist(s)
Christian Paffe	Boys' singles	39.737	39.866	1:19.603	1st place, gold medalist(s)
Tim Brendel; Florian Funk	Boys' doubles	42.700	42.658	1:25.358	2nd place, silver medalist(s)

Girls

Athlete	Event	Final			
Athlete	Event	Run 1	Run 2	Total	Rank
Saskia Langer	Girls' singles	40.056	40.358	1:20.414	2nd place, silver medalist(s)

Team

Athlete	Event	Final				
Athlete	Event	Boys'	Girls'	Doubles	Total	Rank
Saskia Langer; Christian Paffe; Tim Brendel; Florian Funk	Mixed Team Relay	44.788	46.766	47.154	2:18.708	2nd place, silver medalist(s)

== Nordic combined ==
Boys

Athlete	Event	Ski jumping		Cross-country		Final	
Athlete	Event	Points	Rank	Deficit	Ski Time	Total Time	Rank
Tom Lubitz	Boys' individual	137.5	1	0:00	26.57.6	26:57.6	4

== Short track speed skating ==
Girls

Athlete	Event	Quarterfinals		Semifinals		Finals	
Athlete	Event	Time	Rank	Time	Rank	Time	Rank
Elisabeth Witt	Girls' 500 metres	49.788	3 qCD	49.737	3 qD	49.799	1
Elisabeth Witt	Girls' 1000 metres	1:42.928	3 qCD	1:39.667	2 qC	1:40.980	3

Mixed

Athlete	Event	Semifinals		Finals	
Athlete	Event	Time	Rank	Time	Rank
Team D Elisabeth Witt (GER); Thomas Insuk Hong (USA); Sumire Kikuchi (JPN); Yin-Cheng Chang (TPE)	Mixed Team Relay	4:23.141	4 qB	4:24.360	1

== Skeleton ==
Boys

Athlete	Event	Final			
Athlete	Event	Run 1	Run 2	Total	Rank
Sebastian Berneker	Boys' individual	56.20	56.53	1:52.73	1st place, gold medalist(s)

Girls

Athlete	Event	Final			
Athlete	Event	Run 1	Run 2	Total	Rank
Jacqueline Lölling	Girls' individual	CAN	57.43	57.43	1st place, gold medalist(s)
Kim Meylemans	Girls' individual	CAN	59.02	59.02	5

== Ski jumping ==
Boys

Athlete	Event	1st Jump		2nd Jump		Overall	
Athlete	Event	Distance	Points	Distance	Points	Points	Rank
Andreas Wellinger	Boys' individual	74.0m	127.4	73.0m	125.5	252.9	4

Girls

Athlete	Event	1st Jump		2nd Jump		Overall	
Athlete	Event	Distance	Points	Distance	Points	Points	Rank
Katharina Althaus	Girls' individual	71.0m	119.2	72.5m	123.3	242.5	2nd place, silver medalist(s)

Team w/Nordic Combined

Athlete	Event	1st Round	2nd Round	Total	Rank
Katharina Althaus; Tom Lubitz; Andreas Wellinger	Mixed Team	309.8	330.3	640.1	1st place, gold medalist(s)

== Snowboarding ==
Boys

Athlete	Event	Qualifying			Semifinal			Final		
Athlete	Event	Run 1	Run 2	Rank	Run 1	Run 2	Rank	Run 1	Run 2	Rank
Linus Birkendahl	Boys' halfpipe	40.25	21.00	13	did not advance					
Linus Birkendahl	Boys' slopestyle	DNS						did not advance		
Johannes Höpfl	Boys' halfpipe	67.00	21.25	5 q	80.25	21.50	2 Q	64.25	71.50	8
Johannes Höpfl	Boys' slopestyle	13.50	60.50	10				did not advance		

== Speed skating ==
Boys

Athlete	Event	Race 1	Race 2	Total	Rank
Kenneth Stargardt	Boys' 500 m	41.98	41.91	83.89	14
Kenneth Stargardt	Boys' 3000 m			4:44.75	16
Kenneth Stargardt	Boys' Mass Start			LAP	
Niklas Kamphausen	Boys' 1500 m			2:09.14	16
Niklas Kamphausen	Boys' 3000 m			4:36.58	13
Niklas Kamphausen	Boys' Mass Start			7:30.34	18

Girls

Athlete	Event	Race 1	Race 2	Total	Rank
Leia Behlau	Girls' 500 m	44.37	43.76	88.13	5
Leia Behlau	Girls' 1500 m			2:15.75	8
Leia Behlau	Girls' Mass Start			6:06.66	8
Michelle Uhrig	Girls' 500 m	45.17	44.95	90.12	9
Michelle Uhrig	Girls' 3000 m			4:53.47	7
Michelle Uhrig	Girls' Mass Start			6:03.09	5

== See also ==
- Germany at the 2012 Summer Olympics
