= Luge at the 2012 Winter Youth Olympics – Doubles =

Doubles at the I Winter Youth Olympic Games
- Venue: Olympic Sliding Centre Innsbruck
- Dates: 16 January
- Competitors: 22 from 11 nations
- Winning time: 1:25.194

Medalists
1st place, gold medalist(s)		Florian Gruber; Simon Kainzwaldner	Italy
2nd place, silver medalist(s)		Tim Brendl; Florian Funk	Germany
3rd place, bronze medalist(s)		Ty Andersen; Pat Edmunds	United States

The doubles luge at the 2012 Winter Youth Olympics took place on 16 January at the Olympic Sliding Centre Innsbruck.

== Results ==
Two runs were used to determine the winner.

Rank	Bib	Athlete	Country	Run 1	Rank 1	Run 2	Rank 2	Total	Behind
1st place, gold medalist(s)	6	Florian Gruber; Simon Kainzwaldner	Italy	42.590	1	42.604	1	1:25.194	
2nd place, silver medalist(s)	8	Tim Brendl; Florian Funk	Germany	42.700	2	42.658	2	1:25.358	+0.164
3rd place, bronze medalist(s)	5	Ty Andersen; Pat Edmunds	United States	42.817	3	42.949	4	1:25.766	+0.572
4	2	Yury Kalinin; Sergey Belyayev	Russia	43.000	5	42.946	3	1:25.946	+0.752
5	1	Jozef Čikovský; Patrik Tomaško	Slovakia	42.930	4	43.018	7	1:25.948	+0.754
6	10	Thomas Steu; Lorenz Koller	Austria	43.013	6	42.999	6	1:26.012	+0.818
7	9	Kristens Putins; Imants Marcinkēvičs	Latvia	43.415	7	42.985	5	1:26.400	+1.206
8	4	Cosmin Atodiresei; Ștefan Musei	Romania	43.513	9	43.589	9	1:27.102	+1.908
9	11	Jakub Firlej; Mateusz Woźniak	Poland	43.498	8	43.805	10	1:27.303	+2.109
10	7	Stanislav Maltsev; Oleg Faskhutdinov	Kazakhstan	44.007	10	43.451	8	1:27.458	+2.264
	3	Volodymyr Buryy; Anatolii Lehedza	Ukraine	44.028	11	Did not start			
