= Biathlon at the 2012 Winter Youth Olympics – Girls' pursuit =

Girls' pursuit at the I Winter Youth Olympic Games
- Venue: Seefeld Arena
- Date: January 16
- Competitors: 47 from 26 nations

Medalists
1st place, gold medalist(s)		Uliana Kaysheva	Russia
2nd place, silver medalist(s)		Franziska Preuß	Germany
3rd place, bronze medalist(s)		Galina Vishnevskaya	Kazakhstan

The girls' pursuit competition of the biathlon events at the 2012 Winter Youth Olympics in Innsbruck, Austria, was held on January 16, at Seefeld Arena. 47 athletes from 26 nations took part in this event. The race was 7.5 km in length.

== Results ==
The race was started at 12:45.

Rank	Bib	Name	Country	Start	Time	Penalties (P+P+S+S)	Deficit
1st place, gold medalist(s)	3	Uliana Kaisheva	Russia	0:33	26:01.3	0 (0+0+0+0)	–
2nd place, silver medalist(s)	1	Franziska Preuß	Germany	0:00	26:29.2	2 (1+0+1+0)	+27.9
3rd place, bronze medalist(s)	2	Galina Vishnevskaya	Kazakhstan	0:28	27:44.4	4 (0+2+1+1)	+1:43.1
4	4	Lotten Sjödén	Sweden	0:41	28:05.6	3 (1+0+1+1 )	+2:04.3
5	8	Lisa Vittozzi	Italy	1:15	28:07.7	0 (0+0+0+0)	+2:06.4
6	7	Julia Reisinger	Austria	0:56	29:03.3	2 (1+0+0+1)	+3:02.0
7	6	Jessica Jislová	Czech Republic	0:52	29:10.2	2 (0+0+2+0)	+3:08.9
8	18	Yuliya Zhuravok	Ukraine	1:55	29:16.8	0 (0+0+0+0)	+3:15.5
9	5	Natalya Gerbulova	Russia	0:47	29:46.6	5 (2+1+0+2)	+3:45.3
10	13	Anna Kubek	United States	1:29	30:28.5	3 (1+0+0+2)	+4:27.2
11	9	Danielle Vrielink	Canada	1:18	30:34.8	2 (0+1+0+1)	+4:33.5
12	11	Kristin Sandeggen	Norway	1:28	30:55.3	4 (1+0+2+1)	+4:54.0
13	15	Léa Ducordeau	France	1:46	30:59.2	5 (0+0+3+2)	+4:57.9
14	22	Sarah Beaudry	Canada	2:22	31:05.4	2 (1+0+1+0)	+5:04.1
15	12	Chloé Chevalier	France	1:28	31:17.6	7 (3+1+2+1)	+5:16.3
16	20	Aita Gasparin	Switzerland	2:06	31:32.1	4 (1+0+1+2)	+5:30.8
17	23	Zhang Zhaohan	China	2:23	31:40.4	7 (3+1+1+2)	+5:39.1
18	14	Anastasiya Merkushyna	Ukraine	1:34	31:46.4	8 (4+1+1+2)	+5:45.1
19	19	Linn Persson	Sweden	2:02	32:00.7	3 (0+1+2+0)	+5:59.4
20	10	Ivona Fialková	Slovakia	1:20	32:28.7	10 (1+2+5+2)	+6:27.4
21	21	Meril Beilmann	Estonia	2:19	33:00.3	6 (3+0+2+1)	+6:59.0
22	37	Laura Hengelhaupt	Germany	3:51	33:21.4	6 (1+1+3+1)	+7:20.1
23	17	Song Na	China	1:52	33:25.0	7 (0+2+4+1)	+7:23.7
24	30	Jenny Ingman	Finland	2:57	33:42.2	5 (0+2+1+2)	+7:40.9
25	28	Eva Urevc	Slovenia	2:48	33:55.7	10 (2+2+2+4)	+7:54.4
26	27	Tatsiana Tryfanava	Belarus	2:47	33:58.7	9 (2+1+4+2)	+7:57.4
27	32	Anastassiya Kondratyeva	Kazakhstan	3:09	34:04.6	6 (1+0+3+2)	+8:03.3
28	16	Erika Jislová	Czech Republic	1:51	34:04.7	7 (1+2+1+3)	+8:03.4
29	29	Anna Savin	Italy	2:53	34:04.8	6 (2+0+1+3)	+8:03.5
30	34	Beata Lassak	Poland	3:28	34:19.9	8 (1+1+4+2)	+8:18.6
31	41	Anthea Grum	Slovenia	4:24	34:22.0	3 (0+1+1+1)	+8:20.7
32	24	Kinga Mitoraj	Poland	2:31	34:22.4	9 (2+1+4+2)	+8:21.1
33	25	Maarja Maranik	Estonia	2:31	34:22.9	9 (2+3+2+2)	+8:21.6
34	26	Liudmila Kiaura	Belarus	2:35	34:51.9	8 (0+1+5+2)	+8:50.6
35	36	Karoline Næss	Norway	3:43	35:07.7	8 (1+0+5+2)	+9:06.4
36	31	Erika Janka	Finland	3:01	35:11.0	8 (2+0+4+2)	+9:09.7
37	40	Mariela Georgieva	Bulgaria	4:20	36:30.4	5 (2+1+1+1)	+10:29.1
38	33	Iulia Ioana Ţigani	Romania	3:25	36:56.8	7 (2+2+1+2)	+10:55.5
39	42	Nikola Lapinová	Slovakia	4:30	37:07.1	10 (4+3+1+2)	+11:05.8
40	35	Jang Ji-yeon	South Korea	3:41	37:07.5	6 (2+2+1+1)	+11:06.2
41	39	Aleksandra Zakrzewska	United States	3:54	37:18.6	10 (0+1+5+4)	+11:17.3
42	38	Daniela Kadeva	Bulgaria	3:52	37:26.1	5 (0+1+1+3)	+11:24.8
43	44	Gaudvilė Nalivaikaitė	Lithuania	5:13	38:05.4	5 (2+1+2+0)	+12:04.1
44	43	Dorottya Búzás	Romania	4:58	38:58.4	7 (1+2+3+1)	+12:57.1
45	45	Olivia Thomson	New Zealand	6:14	41:40.3	2 (0+0+2+0)	+15:39.0
46	47	Gunita Gaile	Latvia	9:41	42:01.1	4 (0+0+4+0)	+15:59.8
	46	Irina Cozonac	Moldova	7:50	DNF	(1+1+3+)	
