= Skeleton at the 2012 Winter Youth Olympics – Girls' =

Girls' at the I Winter Youth Olympic Games
- Venue: Olympic Sliding Centre Innsbruck
- Date: January 21
- Competitors: 14 from 10 nations
- Winning time: 57.43

Medalists
1st place, gold medalist(s)		Jacqueline Lölling	Germany
2nd place, silver medalist(s)		Carina Mair	Italy
3rd place, bronze medalist(s)		Carli Brockway	Canada

The girls competition of the skeleton events at the 2012 Winter Youth Olympics in Innsbruck, Austria, was held on January 21, at the Olympic Sliding Centre Innsbruck. 14 athletes from ten countries took part in this event. The first run was cancelled.

== Results ==
Rank	Bib	Athletes	Country	Run 2	Total	Behind
1st place, gold medalist(s)	7	Jacqueline Lölling	Germany	57.43	57.43	–
2nd place, silver medalist(s)	6	Carina Mair	Austria	58.40	58.40	+0.97
3rd place, bronze medalist(s)	4	Carli Brockway	Canada	58.48	58.48	+1.05
4	5	Anastasia Shlapak	Russia	58.73	58.73	+1.30
5	10	Kim Meylemans	Germany	59.02	59.02	+1.59
6	3	Elizaveta Zubkova	Russia	59.28	59.28	+1.85
7	14	Lizzie Maxwell	United States	59.50	59.50	+2.07
8	2	Eva Vuga	Slovenia	59.89	59.89	+2.46
9	8	Timi Earl	United States	1:01.04	1:01.04	+3.61
10	9	Ramona Arcoș	Romania	1:01.23	1:01.23	+3.80
11	12	Guendalina Bergonzoni	Italy	1:01.57	1:01.57	+4.14
12	13	Andreea Chiosa	Romania	1:01.65	1:01.65	+4.22
13	1	Astrid Ekelmans	Netherlands	1:01.68	1:01.68	+4.25
14	11	Saki Andō	Japan	1:02.42	1:02.42	+4.99
