= Slovenia at the 2012 Winter Youth Olympics =

- IOC code: SLO
- NOC: Slovenian Olympic Committee
- Website: www.olympic.si

in Innsbruck
- Competitors: 21 in 9 sports
- Flag bearer: Tim-Kevin Ravnjak
- Medals Ranked 16th: Gold 1 Silver 4 Bronze 2 Total 7

Winter Youth Olympics appearances
- 2012; 2016; 2020; 2024

Slovenia competed at the 2012 Winter Youth Olympics in Innsbruck, Austria. The Slovenian team consisted of 21 athletes which competed in 9 sports.

== Medalists ==
Medal	Name	Sport	Event	Date
Gold	Anže Lanišek	Ski jumping	Boys' individual	14 Jan
Silver	Miha Hrobat	Alpine Skiing	Boys' combined	15 Jan
Silver	Tim-Kevin Ravnjak	Snowboarding	Boys' halfpipe	15 Jan
Silver	Anamarija Lampič	Cross-country skiing	Girls' 5km Classical	17 Jan
Silver	Urša Bogataj; Luka Pintarič; Anže Lanišek	Ski jumping	Mixed Team	21 Jan
Bronze	Urša Bogataj	Ski jumping	Girls' individual	14 Jan
Bronze	Lea Einfalt	Cross-country skiing	Girls' 5km Classical	17 Jan

== Alpine skiing ==
Slovenia qualified four athletes.

Boys

Athlete	Event	Final			
Athlete	Event	Run 1	Run 2	Total	Rank
Štefan Hadalin	Slalom	41.01	39.72	1:20.73	5
Štefan Hadalin	Giant slalom	59.27	58.21	1:57.48	17
Štefan Hadalin	Super-G			DNF	
Štefan Hadalin	Combined	1:04.16	38.03	1:42.67	7
Miha Hrobat	Slalom	DNF			
Miha Hrobat	Giant slalom	56.95	DSQ		
Miha Hrobat	Super-G			DNF	
Miha Hrobat	Combined	1:03.32	37.73	1:41.12	2nd place, silver medalist(s)

Girls

Athlete	Event	Final			
Athlete	Event	Run 1	Run 2	Total	Rank
Saša Brezovnik	Slalom	46.93	39.12	1:26.05	9
Saša Brezovnik	Giant slalom	59.26	59.91	1:59.17	10
Saša Brezovnik	Super-G			DNF	
Saša Brezovnik	Combined	1:06.85	36.63	1:43.48	11
Claudia Seidl	Slalom	45.75	40.75	1:26.50	11
Claudia Seidl	Giant slalom	1:01.07	1:00.71	2:01.78	20
Claudia Seidl	Super-G			1:09.92	20
Claudia Seidl	Combined	1:08.44	1:01.19	2:09.63	28

Team

Athlete	Event	Quarterfinals	Semifinals	Final	Rank
Claudia Seidl; Štefan Hadalin; Saša Brezovnik; Miha Hrobat	Parallel mixed team	France; L 2-2	did not advance		5

== Biathlon ==
Slovenia qualified four athletes.

Boys

Athlete	Event	Final		
Athlete	Event	Time	Misses	Rank
Miha Dovžan	Sprint	21:10.2	3	17
Miha Dovžan	Pursuit	30:04.4	1	5
Vid Zabret	Sprint	21:39.3	3	21
Vid Zabret	Pursuit	34:51.8	9	35

Girls

Athlete	Event	Final		
Athlete	Event	Time	Misses	Rank
Anthea Grum	Sprint	21:51.7	6	41
Anthea Grum	Pursuit	34:22.0	3	31
Eva Urevc	Sprint	20:15.8	6	28
Eva Urevc	Pursuit	33:55.7	10	25

Mixed

Athlete	Event	Final		
Athlete	Event	Time	Misses	Rank
Eva Urevc; Anthea Grum; Vid Zabret; Miha Dovžan	Mixed relay	1:18:07.6	2+17	11
Eva Urevc; Anamarija Lampič; Miha Dovzan; Miha Šimenc	Cross-Country-Biathlon Mixed Relay	1:10:10.0	4+9	16

== Cross-country skiing ==
Slovenia qualified four athletes.

Boys

Athlete	Event	Final	
Athlete	Event	Time	Rank
Miha Šimenc	10km classical	30:30.9	7
Matic Slabe	10km classical	31:55.2	22

Girls

Athlete	Event	Final	
Athlete	Event	Time	Rank
Lea Einfalt	5km classical	15:01.2	3rd place, bronze medalist(s)
Anamarija Lampič	5km classical	14:37.7	2nd place, silver medalist(s)

Sprint

Athlete	Event	Qualification		Quarterfinal		Semifinal		Final	
Athlete	Event	Total	Rank	Total	Rank	Total	Rank	Total	Rank
Miha Šimenc	Boys' sprint	1:48.15	21 Q	1:46.9	2 Q	2:04.0	6	did not advance	
Matic Slabe	Boys' sprint	1:54.56	37	did not advance					
Lea Einfalt	Girls' sprint	2:04.06	19 Q	1:59.4	3 Q	2:00.2	3 Q	2:04.6	6
Anamarija Lampič	Girls' sprint	2:00.18	8 Q	2:00.6	1 Q	1:58.9	2 Q	1:58.9	4

Mixed

Athlete	Event	Final		
Athlete	Event	Time	Misses	Rank
Eva Urevc; Anamarija Lampič; Miha Dovzan; Miha Šimenc	Cross-Country-Biathlon Mixed Relay	1:10:10.0	4+9	16

== Freestyle skiing ==
Slovenia qualified one athlete.

Ski Half-Pipe

Athlete	Event	Qualifying		Final	
Athlete	Event	Points	Rank	Points	Rank
Monika Loboda	Girls' ski half-pipe	41.00	9	did not advance	

== Ice hockey ==
Slovenia qualified two athletes.

Boys

Athlete(s)	Event	Qualification		Grand final	
Athlete(s)	Event	Points	Rank	Points	Rank
Primož Čuvan	Individual skills	14	5 Q	18	5

Girls

Athlete(s)	Event	Qualification		Grand final	
Athlete(s)	Event	Points	Rank	Points	Rank
Urša Pazlar	Individual skills	0	15	did not advance	

== Nordic combined ==
Slovenia qualified one athlete.

Boys

Athlete	Event	Ski jumping		Cross-country		Final	
Athlete	Event	Points	Rank	Deficit	Ski Time	Total Time	Rank
Luka Pintarič	Boys' individual	125.8	6	0:47	28:43.8	29:30.8	10

== Skeleton ==
Slovenia qualified one athlete.

Girls

Athlete	Event	Final			
Athlete	Event	Run 1	Run 2	Total	Rank
Eva Vuga	Girls' individual	CAN	59.89	59.89	8

== Ski jumping ==
Slovenia qualified two athletes.

Boys

Athlete	Event	1st Jump		2nd Jump		Overall	
Athlete	Event	Distance	Points	Distance	Points	Points	Rank
Anže Lanišek	Boys' individual	81.0m	143.7	79.0m	142.4	286.1	1st place, gold medalist(s)

Girls

Athlete	Event	1st Jump		2nd Jump		Overall	
Athlete	Event	Distance	Points	Distance	Points	Points	Rank
Urša Bogataj	Girls' individual	71.5m	120.4	71.5m	118.9	239.3	3rd place, bronze medalist(s)

Team w/Nordic Combined

Athlete	Event	1st Round	2nd Round	Total	Rank
Urša Bogataj; Luka Pintarič; Anže Lanišek	Mixed Team	262.5	348.0	610.5	2nd place, silver medalist(s)

== Snowboarding ==
Slovenia qualified two athletes.

Boys

Athlete	Event	Qualifying			Semifinal			Final		
Athlete	Event	Run 1	Run 2	Rank	Run 1	Run 2	Rank	Run 1	Run 2	Rank
Jan Kralj	Boys' halfpipe	65.50	69.00	4 q	76.00	67.50	3 Q	68.25	75.00	6
Jan Kralj	Boys' slopestyle	73.75	51.00	5 Q				58.50	85.25	4
Tim-Kevin Ravnjak	Boys' halfpipe	89.25	93.00	1 Q				59.35	86.75	2nd place, silver medalist(s)
Tim-Kevin Ravnjak	Boys' slopestyle	43.75	73.25	6 Q				41.75	41.75	15

== See also ==
- Slovenia at the 2012 Summer Olympics
