= Lisa Unterweger =

Austrian cross-country skier

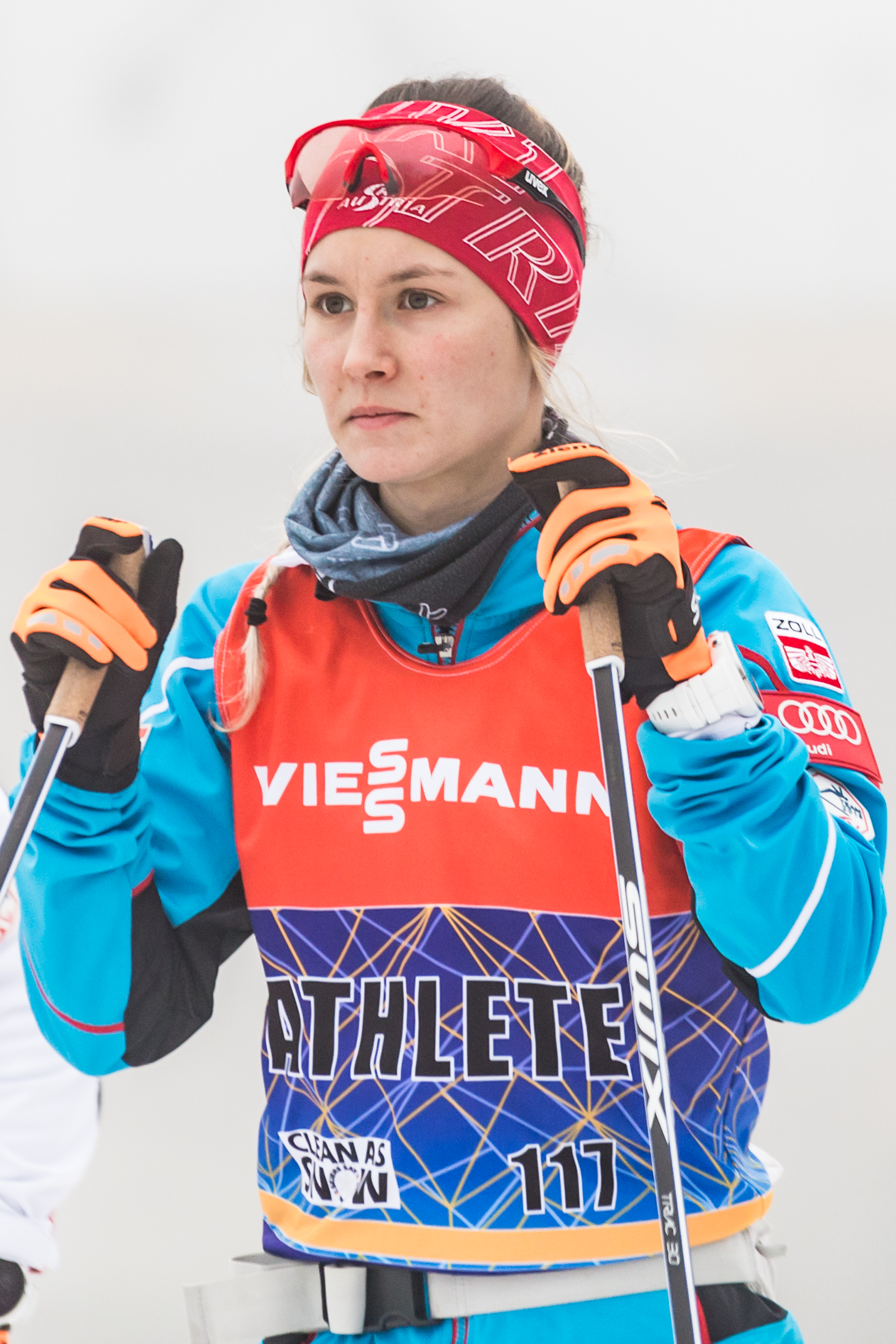
- Unterweger in 2018

Personal information
- Nationality: Austria
- Born: 4 February 1995 (age 31) Ramsau am Dachstein, Austria
- Height: 163 cm (5 ft 4 in)

Sport
- Sport: Skiing
- Club: SK Rottenmann-Steiermark

World Cup career
- Seasons: 7 – (2016, 2018–present)
- Indiv. starts: 66
- Indiv. podiums: 0
- Team starts: 2
- Team podiums: 0
- Overall titles: 0 – (91st in 2023)
- Discipline titles: 0
- Updated on 27 March 2023

Lisa Unterweger (born 4 February 1995) is an Austrian cross-country skier. She competed in the women's sprint at the 2018 Winter Olympics. Unterweger also competed at the 2022 Winter Olympics.

== Cross-country skiing results ==
All results are sourced from the International Ski Federation (FIS).

=== Olympic Games ===
Year	Age	10 km individual	15 km skiathlon	30 km mass start	Sprint	4 × 5 km relay	Team sprint
2018	23	67	—	—	50	—	14
2022	27	31	—	—	34	—	6

=== World Championships ===
Year	Age	10 km individual	15 km skiathlon	30 km mass start	Sprint	4 × 5 km relay	Team sprint
2017	22	—	—	—	36	—	16
2019	24	31	—	43	44	—	—
2021	26	52	—	—	49	—	16
2023	28	—	—	DNF	48	—	—

=== World Cup ===
==== Season standings ====
Season	Age	Discipline standings				Ski Tour standings				
Season	Age	Overall	Distance	Sprint	U23	Nordic Opening	Tour de Ski	Ski Tour 2020	World Cup Final	Ski Tour Canada
2016	21	NC	NC	—	NC	—	DNF	—N/a	—N/a	—
2018	23	102	NC	70	18	—	DNF	—N/a	52	—N/a
2019	24	NC	NC	NC	—N/a	—	DNF	—N/a	—	—N/a
2020	25	96	74	78	—N/a	61	DNF	—	—N/a	—N/a
2021	26	106	NC	71	—N/a	58	DNF	—N/a	—N/a	—N/a
2022	27	108	NC	71	—N/a	—N/a	—	—N/a	—N/a	—N/a
2023	28	91	72	71	—N/a	—N/a	DNF	—N/a	—N/a	—N/a
