= Anastasiia Gorbunova =

Ukrainian alpine skier (born 1995)

Personal information
- Full name: Anastasiia Gorbunova
- Born: 19 May 1995 (age 31) Ukraine

Sport
- Sport: Skiing
- Updated on 15 February 2013

Anastasiia Gorbunova (Ukrainian: Анастасі́я Горбуно́ва; born 19 May 1995) is an alpine skier from Ukraine.

== Performances ==
Level	Year	Event	SL	GS	SG	DH	SC	T
JWSC	2011	Crans Montana, Switzerland	DNF1	41	DNF1			
YOLY	2012	Innsbruck, Austria	DNF2	30	26		DNS2	
JWSC	2012	Roccaraso, Italy	DNF1	68	43			
AWSC	2013	Schladming, Austria		59				
