= Triin Tobi =

Estonian alpine skier (born 1995)

Personal information
- Born: 3 June 1995 (age 31) Tartu, Estonia

Sport
- Country: Estonia
- Sport: Alpine skiing

Triin Tobi (born 3 June 1995) is an alpine skier from Estonia. She was born in Tartu, and competed for Estonia at the 2014 Winter Olympics in the slalom and giant slalom.
