= Romania at the 2012 Winter Youth Olympics =

- IOC code: ROU
- NOC: Romanian Olympic and Sports Committee
- Website: www.cosr.ro

in Innsbruck
- Competitors: 22 in 9 sports
- Flag bearer: Daniel Pripici
- Medals: Gold 0 Silver 0 Bronze 0 Total 0

Winter Youth Olympics appearances
- 2012; 2016; 2020; 2024

Romania competed at the 2012 Winter Youth Olympics in Innsbruck, Austria.

== Alpine skiing ==
Romania qualified 1 athlete.

Boys

| Athlete | Event | Final | | | |
| Athlete | Event | Run 1 | Run 2 | Total | Rank |
|---|---|---|---|---|---|
| Mihai Andrei Cenţiu | Slalom | 46.61 | 46.82 | 1:33.43 | 27 |
| Mihai Andrei Cenţiu | Giant slalom | 1:02.69 | 58.39 | 2:01.08 | 23 |
| Mihai Andrei Cenţiu | Super-G | | | 1:09.42 | 30 |
| Mihai Andrei Cenţiu | Combined | 1:08.17 | 43.89 | 1:52.06 | 25 |

== Biathlon ==
Romania qualified 3 athletes.

Boys

| Athlete | Event | Final | | |
| Athlete | Event | Time | Misses | Rank |
|---|---|---|---|---|
| Marius Petru Ungureanu | Sprint | 22:30.4 | 3 | 37 |
| Marius Petru Ungureanu | Pursuit | 33:20.8 | 5 | 23 |

Girls

| Athlete | Event | Final | | |
| Athlete | Event | Time | Misses | Rank |
|---|---|---|---|---|
| Dorottya Búzás | Sprint | 22:25.9 | 5 | 43 |
| Dorottya Búzás | Pursuit | 38:58.4 | 7 | 44 |
| Iulia Ioana Ţigani | Sprint | 20:52.2 | 2 | 33 |
| Iulia Ioana Ţigani | Pursuit | 36:56.8 | 7 | 38 |

Mixed

| Athlete | Event | Final | | |
| Athlete | Event | Time | Misses | Rank |
|---|---|---|---|---|
| Iulia Ioana Tigani; Simona Ungureanu; Marius Petru Ungureanu; Daniel Pripici | Cross-Country-Biathlon Mixed Relay | 1:14:33.5 | 2+10 | 21 |

== Bobsleigh ==
Romania qualified 2 athletes.

Girls

| Athlete | Event | Final | | | |
| Athlete | Event | Run 1 | Run 2 | Total | Rank |
|---|---|---|---|---|---|
| Ana Andreea Constantin; Andreea Grecu | Two-Girls | 56.42 | 56.52 | 1:52.94 | 6 |

== Cross-country skiing ==
Romania qualified 2 athletes.

Boys

| Athlete | Event | Final | |
| Athlete | Event | Time | Rank |
|---|---|---|---|
| Daniel Pripici | 10km classical | 33:15.4 | 30 |

Girls

| Athlete | Event | Final | |
| Athlete | Event | Time | Rank |
|---|---|---|---|
| Simona Ungureanu | 5km classical | 18:52.9 | 35 |

Sprint

| Athlete | Event | Qualification | | Quarterfinal | | Semifinal | | Final | |
| Athlete | Event | Total | Rank | Total | Rank | Total | Rank | Total | Rank |
|---|---|---|---|---|---|---|---|---|---|
| Daniel Pripici | Boys' sprint | 1:48.54 | 22 Q | 1:54.4 | 6 | did not advance | | | |
| Simona Ungureanu | Girls' sprint | 2:08.45 | 27 Q | 2:11.3 | 6 | did not advance | | | |

Mixed

| Athlete | Event | Final | | |
| Athlete | Event | Time | Misses | Rank |
|---|---|---|---|---|
| Iulia Ioana Tigani; Simona Ungureanu; Marius Petru Ungureanu; Daniel Pripici | Cross-Country-Biathlon Mixed Relay | 1:14:33.5 | 2+10 | 21 |

== Ice hockey ==
Romania qualified 2 athletes.

Boys

| Athlete(s) | Event | Qualification | | Grand final | |
| Athlete(s) | Event | Points | Rank | Points | Rank |
|---|---|---|---|---|---|
| Mihai Andrei Sotir | Individual skills | 6 | 13 | did not advance | |

Girls

| Athlete(s) | Event | Qualification | | Grand final | |
| Athlete(s) | Event | Points | Rank | Points | Rank |
|---|---|---|---|---|---|
| Noemi Ballo | Individual skills | 0 | 14 | did not advance | |

== Luge ==
Romania qualified 5 athletes.

Boys

| Athlete | Event | Final | | | |
| Athlete | Event | Run 1 | Run 2 | Total | Rank |
|---|---|---|---|---|---|
| Daniel Vlăduţ Popa | Boys' singles | 41.714 | 40.894 | 1:22.608 | 23 |
| Cosmin Atodiresei; Ștefan Musei | Boys' doubles | 43.513 | 43.589 | 1:27.102 | 8 |

Girls

| Athlete | Event | Final | | | |
| Athlete | Event | Run 1 | Run 2 | Total | Rank |
|---|---|---|---|---|---|
| Elena Denisa Poştoacă | Girls' singles | 41.125 | 41.325 | 1:22.450 | 16 |
| Anamaria Loredana Şovăială | Girls' singles | 41.233 | 41.134 | 1:22.367 | 15 |

Team

| Athlete | Event | Final | | | | |
| Athlete | Event | Boys' | Girls' | Doubles | Total | Rank |
|---|---|---|---|---|---|---|
| Anamaria Loredana Şovăială; Daniel Vladut Popa; Cosmin Atodiresei; Ștefan Musei | Mixed Team Relay | 45.821 | 49.340 | 48.150 | 2:23.311 | 11 |

== Skeleton ==
Romania qualified 3 athletes.

Boys

| Athlete | Event | Final | | | |
| Athlete | Event | Run 1 | Run 2 | Total | Rank |
|---|---|---|---|---|---|
| Cosmin Marius Chioibaşu | Boys' individual | 57.97 | 57.89 | 1:55.86 | 4 |

Girls

| Athlete | Event | Final | | | |
| Athlete | Event | Run 1 | Run 2 | Total | Rank |
|---|---|---|---|---|---|
| Ramona Gabriela Arcoş | Girls' individual | CAN | 1:01.23 | 1:01.23 | 10 |
| Andreea Chiosa | Girls' individual | CAN | 1:01.65 | 1:01.65 | 12 |

== Ski jumping ==
Romania qualified 1 athlete.

Boys

| Athlete | Event | 1st Jump | | 2nd Jump | | Overall | |
| Athlete | Event | Distance | Points | Distance | Points | Points | Rank |
|---|---|---|---|---|---|---|---|
| Robert Valentin Tatu | Boys' individual | 62.5m | 95.8 | 62.0m | 92.1 | 187.9 | 17 |

== Speed skating ==
Romania qualified 3 athletes.

Boys

| Athlete | Event | Race 1 | Race 2 | Total | Rank |
|---|---|---|---|---|---|
| Cristian Adrian Mocanu | Boys' 500 m | 40.50 | 40.22 | 80.72 | 10 |
| Cristian Adrian Mocanu | Boys' Mass Start | | | LAP | |

Girls

| Athlete | Event | Race 1 | Race 2 | Total | Rank |
|---|---|---|---|---|---|
| Bianca Lorena Stănică | Girls' 500 m | 45.97 | 45.63 | 91.60 | 12 |
| Bianca Lorena Stănică | Girls' Mass Start | | | 6:26.07 | 18 |
| Alina Bianca Dănescu | Girls' 1500 m | | | 2:23.40 | 15 |
| Alina Bianca Dănescu | Girls' 3000 m | | | DSQ | |
| Alina Bianca Dănescu | Girls' Mass Start | | | 6:09.66 | 12 |

== See also ==
- Romania at the 2012 Summer Olympics
