= Slovakia at the 2012 Winter Youth Olympics =

- IOC code: SVK
- NOC: Slovak Olympic Committee
- Website: www.olympic.sk

in Innsbruck
- Competitors: 30 in 5 sports
- Flag bearer: Andrej Segec
- Medals Ranked 19th: Gold 1 Silver 0 Bronze 0 Total 1

Winter Youth Olympics appearances (overview)
- 2012; 2016; 2020; 2024

Slovakia competed at the 2012 Winter Youth Olympics in Innsbruck, Austria. The Slovak team consisted of 30 athletes competing in 5 sports.

== Medalists ==
Medal	Name	Sport	Event	Date
Gold	Petra Vlhová	Alpine Skiing	Girls' slalom	20 Jan

== Alpine skiing ==
Slovakia qualified two athletes.

Boys

Athlete	Event	Final			
Athlete	Event	Run 1	Run 2	Total	Rank
Roman Murin	Slalom				
Roman Murin	Giant slalom	1:00.67	DNF		
Roman Murin	Super-G			1:07.01	18
Roman Murin	Combined	1:05.37	DNF		

Girls

Athlete	Event	Final			
Athlete	Event	Run 1	Run 2	Total	Rank
Petra Vlhová	Slalom	40.71	39.05	1:19.76	1st place, gold medalist(s)
Petra Vlhová	Giant slalom	57.35	59.16	1:56.61	4
Petra Vlhová	Super-G			1:06.86	9
Petra Vlhová	Combined	1:06.71	35.51	1:42.22	4

== Biathlon ==
Slovakia has qualified four athletes.

Boys

Athlete	Event	Final		
Athlete	Event	Time	Misses	Rank
Ondrej Kosztolanyi	Sprint	22:48.5	4	41
Ondrej Kosztolanyi	Pursuit	34:52.2	6	36
Peter Oravec	Sprint	23:48.0	5	44
Peter Oravec	Pursuit	38:22.1	9	44

Girls

Athlete	Event	Final		
Athlete	Event	Time	Misses	Rank
Ivona Fialkova	Sprint	18:47.2	1	10
Ivona Fialkova	Pursuit	32:28.5	10	20
Nikola Lapinova	Sprint	21:57.3	5	42
Nikola Lapinova	Pursuit	37:07.1	10	39

Mixed

Athlete	Event	Final		
Athlete	Event	Time	Misses	Rank
Ivona Fialkova; Nikola Lapinova; Ondrej Kosztolanyi; Peter Oravec	Mixed relay	1:24:42.9	11+17	17
Ivona Fialkova; Barbora Klementova; Ondrej Kosztolanyi; Andrej Segec	Cross-Country-Biathlon Mixed Relay	1:10:14.7	1+10	17

== Cross-country skiing ==
Slovakia qualified two athletes.

Boys

Athlete	Event	Final	
Athlete	Event	Time	Rank
Andrej Segec	10km classical	32:44.5	27

Girls

Athlete	Event	Final	
Athlete	Event	Time	Rank
Barbora Klementova	5km classical	16:16.5	12

Sprint

Athlete	Event	Qualification		Quarterfinal		Semifinal		Final	
Athlete	Event	Total	Rank	Total	Rank	Total	Rank	Total	Rank
Andrej Segec	Boys' sprint	1:47.23	15 Q	1:50.0	3	did not advance			
Barbora Klementova	Girls' sprint	2:01.37	11 Q	2:01.5	3	did not advance			

Mixed

Athlete	Event	Final		
Athlete	Event	Time	Misses	Rank
Ivona Fialkova; Barbora Klementova; Ondrej Kosztolanyi; Andrej Segec	Cross-Country-Biathlon Mixed Relay	1:10:14.7	1+10	17

== Ice hockey ==
Slovakia qualified a women's team.

Roster

- Viktoria Frankovicova
- Maria Hudecova
- Nikola Kaliska
- Romana Kiapesova
- Jana Kubalikova
- Zuzana Kubalikova
- Lubica Levcikova
- Katarina Luptakova
- Martina Matiskova
- Diana Papesova
- Maria Rajtarova
- Nikola Rezankova
- Lubica Stofankova
- Julia Svagerkova
- Dominika Takacova
- Miroslava Vavakova
- Silvia Vojtkova

Group A

Team	GP	W	OTW	OTL	L	GF	GA	Diff	PTS
Sweden	4	4	0	0	0	43	0	+43	12
Austria	4	3	0	0	1	22	6	+16	9
Germany	4	2	0	0	2	12	16	-4	6
Kazakhstan	4	1	0	0	3	3	28	-25	3
Slovakia	4	0	0	0	4	1	31	-30	0

January 13, 2012; 8:00	Austria	9–0 (2–0, 5–0, 2–0)	Slovakia	Tyrolean Ice Arena; Attendance: 245

Game reference

Paula Camilla Marchhart
Goalies
Nikola Kaliska
Referee:
(Finland) Kaisa Ketonen
Linesmen:
(Czech Republic) Nikola Dvorakova
(Italy) Mirjam Gruber

J. Willenshofer (V. Hummel, N. Arnberger) (PP) – 5:51	1–0
T. Grascher (J. Frick) – 8:33	2–0
T. Grascher (A. Meixner) – 15:46	3–0
A. Guertler (T. Grascher, A. Iberer) – 17:07	4–0
J. Frick – 21:34	5–0
P. Polczik (V. Hummel) – 23:32	6–0
A. Meixner (J. Willenshofer) – 24:59	7–0
J. Frick (A. Meixner, A. List) (PP) – 33:15	8–0
J. Willenshofer (V. Hummel) – 37:23	9–0

2 min
Penalties
4 min
44
Shots
3

January 15, 2012; 11:15	Slovakia	0–8 (0–4, 0–1, 0–3)	Germany	Tyrolean Ice Arena; Attendance: 286

Nikola Kaliska
Goalies
Viola Hotter
Referee:
(United States) Ceci Morris
Linesmen:
(China) HUI Wang
(Denmark) Trine Viskum

0–1	7:59 – V. Offermann
0–2	9:19 – V. Offermann (P. Szawlowski)
0–3	11:02 – P. Szawlowski (L. Geelhaar, A. Fiegert)
0–4	12:57 – V. Offermann (L. Geelhaar, T. Fritz) (SH)
0–5	24:25 – S. Selzer (K. Oertel, A. Fiegert) (SH)
0–6	30:46 – A. Fiegert (V. Offermann) (SH)
0–7	41:38 – A. Fiegert (V. Offermann)
0–8	43:03 – N. Korff (T. Hoppe, J. Winter) (PP)

4 min
Penalties
8 min
3
Shots
66

January 17, 2012; 13:30	Slovakia	1–2 (0–1, 0–0, 1–1)	Kazakhstan	Tyrolean Ice Arena; Attendance: 359

Romana Kiapesova
Goalies
Anastassiya Ogay
Referee:
(Finland) Kaisa Ketonen
Linesmen:
(Czech Republic) Nikola Dvorakova
(China) HUI Wang

	0–1	10:35 – S. Urpekbayeva (M. Ryspek, Z. Nurgaliyeva) (PP)
	0–2	33:38 – A. Matussevich (Z. Nurgaliyeva)
S. Vojtkova (D. Papesova) (PP) – 39:08	1–2

2 min
Penalties
8 min
15
Shots
31

January 18, 2012; 9:30	Sweden	12–0 (7–0, 4–0, 1–0)	Slovakia	Tyrolean Ice Arena; Attendance: 589

Sara Besseling
Goalies
Romana Kiapesova
Referee:
(Canada) Meghan Mallette
Linesmen:
(China) HUI Wang
(Denmark) Trine Viskum

J. Eidensten (A. Johansson) (PP) – 3:22	1–0
A. Kjellbin (K. Andersson) – 4:56	2–0
M. Wong (R. Hoglund, W. Ekstrom) – 6:31	3–0
M. Wong (R. Hoglund) – 6:54	4–0
C. Lillback – 7:08	5–0
S. Kuller (M. Andersson, C. Lillback) – 7:50	6–0
M. Wong (E. Alasalmi) – 9:20	7–0
K. Andersson (W. Ekstrom) – 17:53	8–0
C. Lillback (S. Kuller, L. Backlin) (SH) – 21:13	9–0
M. Wong (R. Hoglund) – 29:10	10–0
K. Andersson (M. Andersson, S. Kuller) – 29:51	11–0
S. Kuller (K. Andersson, A. Kjellbin) – 33:37	12–0

4 min
Penalties
2 min
80
Shots
1

Slovakia failed to qualify for the semifinals.

== Luge ==
Slovakia qualified five athletes.

Boys

Athlete	Event	Final			
Athlete	Event	Run 1	Run 2	Total	Rank
Jozef Petrulak	Boys' singles	40.718	40.493	1:21.211	18
Jozef Cikovsky; Patrik Tomasko	Boys' doubles	42.930	43.018	1:25.948	5

Girls

Athlete	Event	Final			
Athlete	Event	Run 1	Run 2	Total	Rank
Nikola Drajnova	Girls' singles	41.574	41.326	1:22.900	19
Tatiana Zifcakova	Girls' singles	41.080	41.727	1:22.807	17

Team

Athlete	Event	Final				
Athlete	Event	Boys'	Girls'	Doubles	Total	Rank
Nikola Drajnova; Jozef Petrulak; Jozef Cikovsky; Patrik Tomasko	Mixed Team Relay	45.969	47.911	47.396	2:21.276	9

== See also ==
- Slovakia at the 2012 Summer Olympics
