= Latvia at the 2012 Winter Youth Olympics =

- IOC code: LAT
- NOC: Latvian Olympic Committee
- Website: www.olimpiade.lv

in Innsbruck
- Competitors: 16 in 7 sports
- Flag bearer: Ulla Zirne
- Medals Ranked 17th: Gold 1 Silver 1 Bronze 1 Total 3

Winter Youth Olympics appearances
- 2012; 2016; 2020; 2024

Latvia competed at the 2012 Winter Youth Olympics in Innsbruck, Austria. The Latvian team consisted of 16 athletes in 7 sports.

== Medalists ==
Medal	Name	Sport	Event	Date
Gold	Augusts Vasiļonoks	Ice hockey	Boys' individual skills	19 Jan
Silver	Riks Rozītis	Luge	Boys' singles	15 Jan
Bronze	Ulla Zirne	Luge	Girls' singles	16 Jan

== Alpine skiing ==
Latvia qualified one boy and girl in alpine skiing.

Boy

Athlete	Event	Final			
Athlete	Event	Run 1	Run 2	Total	Rank
Miks Zvejnieks	Slalom	43.35	39.83	1:23.18	13
Miks Zvejnieks	Giant slalom	1:00.31	56.16	1:56.47	13
Miks Zvejnieks	Super-G			1:09.99	32
Miks Zvejnieks	Combined	DNF			

Girl

Athlete	Event	Final			
Athlete	Event	Run 1	Run 2	Total	Rank
Agnese Āboltiņa	Slalom	48.41	42.87	1:31.28	16
Agnese Āboltiņa	Giant slalom	DNF			
Agnese Āboltiņa	Super-G			1:13.14	27
Agnese Āboltiņa	Combined	1:10.67	41.62	1:52.29	22

== Biathlon ==
Latvia qualified a full biathlon team of 2 boys and 1 girl.

Boys

Athlete	Event	Final		
Athlete	Event	Time	Misses	Rank
Jānis Slavēns	Sprint	23:50.9	2	45
Jānis Slavēns	Pursuit	41:33.3	10	48
Linards Zēmelis	Sprint	25:11.0	5	49
Linards Zēmelis	Pursuit	37:56.6	2	43

Girl

Athlete	Event	Final		
Athlete	Event	Time	Misses	Rank
Gunita Gaile	Sprint	27:09.1	6	47
Gunita Gaile	Pursuit	42:01.1	4	46

Mixed

Athlete	Event	Final		
Athlete	Event	Time	Misses	Rank
Gunita Gaile; Zane Eglīte; Linards Zemelis; Arnis Pētersons	Cross-Country-Biathlon Mixed Relay	1:17:29.0	0+6	23

== Bobsleigh ==
Latvia qualified one boy.

Boys

Athlete	Event	Final			
Athlete	Event	Run 1	Run 2	Total	Rank
Oskars Ķibermanis; Elvis Kamšs	Two-Boys	54.57	54.80	1:49.37	4

== Cross country skiing ==
Latvia qualified one boy and girl.

Boy

Athlete	Event	Final	
Athlete	Event	Time	Rank
Arnis Pētersons	10km classical	32:14.7	24

Girl

Athlete	Event	Final	
Athlete	Event	Time	Rank
Zane Eglīte	5km classical	20:54.0	38

Sprint

Athlete	Event	Qualification		Quarterfinal		Semifinal		Final	
Athlete	Event	Total	Rank	Total	Rank	Total	Rank	Total	Rank
Arnis Pētersons	Boys' sprint	1:49.62	26 Q	1:50.1	4	did not advance			
Zane Eglīte	Girls' sprint	2:24.79	37	did not advance					

Mixed

Athlete	Event	Final		
Athlete	Event	Time	Misses	Rank
Gunita Gaile; Zane Eglīte; Linards Zemelis; Arnis Pētersons	Cross-Country-Biathlon Mixed Relay	1:17:29.0	0+6	23

== Ice hockey ==
Latvia qualified one boy to compete in the skills challenge competition.

Boy

Athlete(s)	Event	Qualification		Grand final	
Athlete(s)	Event	Points	Rank	Points	Rank
Augusts Vasiļonoks	Individual skills	35	1 Q	22	1st place, gold medalist(s)

== Luge ==
Latvia qualified five athletes.

Athlete	Event	Run 1	Run 2	Total	Rank
Rihards Lozbers	Boys' singles	40.110	40.003	1:20.113	6
Riks Rozītis	Boys' singles	39.838	39.968	1:19.806	2nd place, silver medalist(s)
Imants Marcinkēvičs; Kristens Putins	Doubles	43.415	42.985	1:26.400	7
Ulla Zirne	Girls' singles	40.184	40.295	1:20.479	3rd place, bronze medalist(s)

Team

Athlete	Event	Final				
Athlete	Event	Boys'	Girls'	Doubles	Total	Rank
Ulla Zirne; Riks Rozītis; Kristens Putins; Imants Marcinkēvičs	Mixed Team Relay	44.742	48.197	47.184	2:20.123	6

== Skeleton ==
Latvia qualified one boy in skeleton.

Boy

Athlete	Event	Final			
Athlete	Event	Run 1	Run 2	Total	Rank
Dāvis Dreimanis	Boys' individual	59.22	59.24	1:58.46	8

== See also ==
- Latvia at the 2012 Summer Olympics
