= New Zealand at the 2012 Winter Youth Olympics =

- IOC code: NZL
- NOC: New Zealand Olympic Committee
- Website: www.olympic.org.nz

in Innsbruck
- Competitors: 15 in 7 sports
- Flag bearer: Beau-James Wells
- Medals: Gold 0 Silver 0 Bronze 0 Total 0

Winter Youth Olympics appearances
- 2012; 2016; 2020; 2024

New Zealand competed at the 2012 Winter Youth Olympics in Innsbruck, Austria.

== Alpine skiing ==
New Zealand qualified two athletes.

Athlete	Event	Final			
Athlete	Event	Run 1	Run 2	Total	Rank
Piera Hudson	Girls' slalom	47.93	41.69	1:29.62	15
Piera Hudson	Girls' giant slalom	1:00.51	DNF		
Piera Hudson	Girls' super-G	1:08.06	—N/a	1:08.06	17
Piera Hudson	Girls' combined	1:07.52	40.28	1:47.80	16
Harry Izard-Price	Boys' slalom	46.12	43.05	1:29.17	23
Harry Izard-Price	Boys' giant slalom	1:00.76	56.31	1:57.07	14
Harry Izard-Price	Boys' super-G	1:09.52	—N/a	1:09.52	31
Harry Izard-Price	Boys' combined	1:07.66	40.62	1:48.28	22

== Biathlon ==
New Zealand qualified one athlete.

Athlete	Event	Final		
Athlete	Event	Time	Misses	Rank
Olivia Thomson	Girls' sprint	23:41.4	1	45
Olivia Thomson	Girls' pursuit	41:40.3	2	45

== Curling ==
New Zealand qualified a team.

Roster

- Skip: Luke Steele
- Third: Eleanor Adviento
- Second: David Weyer
- Lead: Kelsi Heath

=== Mixed team ===
Final Round Robin Standings

Blue Group	Skip	W	L
United States	Korey Dropkin	7	0
Switzerland	Michael Brunner	6	1
Czech Republic	Marek Černovský	4	3
China	Bai Yang	3	4
Norway	Markus Skogvold	3	4
South Korea	Kang Sue-yeon	2	5
New Zealand	Luke Steele	2	5
Estonia	Robert-Kent Päll	1	6

==== Round Robin ====
Draw 1

Sheet B	1	2	3	4	5	6	7	8	Final
Switzerland (Brunner)	1	1	0	1	0	2	1	X	6
New Zealand (Steele) 🔨	0	0	1	0	1	0	0	X	2

Draw 2

Sheet A	1	2	3	4	5	6	7	8	Final
New Zealand (Steele)	0	0	0	1	0	1	X	X	2
United States (Dropkin) 🔨	2	2	1	0	5	0	X	X	10

Draw 3

Sheet D	1	2	3	4	5	6	7	8	Final
New Zealand (Steele) 🔨	1	1	2	0	0	1	0	2	7
China (Bai)	0	0	0	3	2	0	1	0	6

Draw 4

Sheet B	1	2	3	4	5	6	7	8	Final
New Zealand (Steele) 🔨	0	2	0	2	2	0	0	1	7
Estonia (Päll)	1	0	1	0	0	1	3	0	6

Draw 5

Sheet C	1	2	3	4	5	6	7	8	Final
New Zealand (Steele) 🔨	1	0	2	0	0	2	1	0	6
Norway (Skogvold)	0	2	0	2	2	0	0	1	7

Draw 6

Sheet A	1	2	3	4	5	6	7	8	Final
Czech Republic (Černovský)	0	2	2	0	3	0	2	X	9
New Zealand (Steele) 🔨	1	0	0	2	0	1	0	X	4

Draw 7

Sheet C	1	2	3	4	5	6	7	8	Final
South Korea (Kang) 🔨	2	3	0	1	0	0	3	X	9
New Zealand (Steele)	0	0	1	0	2	1	0	X	4

=== Mixed doubles ===
Round of 32

Sheet C	1	2	3	4	5	6	7	8	Final
Thomas Scoffin (CAN); Kelsi Heath (NZL)	0	0	4	1	1	0	3	X	9
Mizuki Kitaguchi (JPN); Thomas Muirhead (GBR) 🔨	1	2	0	0	0	2	0	X	5

Sheet B	1	2	3	4	5	6	7	8	Final
Angharad Ward (GBR); Markus Skogvold (NOR) 🔨	3	1	0	1	0	3	0	0	8
Luke Steele (NZL); Johanna Heldin (SWE)	0	0	3	0	1	0	4	1	9

Sheet D	1	2	3	4	5	6	7	8	Final
Marek Černovský (CZE); Rachel Hannen (GBR)	0	2	1	2	0	0	2	1	8
Denise Pimpini (ITA); David Weyer (NZL) 🔨	2	0	0	0	2	1	0	0	5

Sheet A	1	2	3	4	5	6	7	8	9	Final
Eleanor Adviento (NZL); Romano Meier (SUI) 🔨	2	0	1	0	1	0	3	0	0	7
Duncan Menzies (GBR); Taylor Anderson (USA)	0	1	0	2	0	2	0	2	1	8

Round of 16

Sheet C	1	2	3	4	5	6	7	8	Final
Korey Dropkin (USA); Marina Verenich (RUS) 🔨	1	0	5	0	1	2	1	X	10
Luke Steele (NZL); Johanna Heldin (SWE)	0	1	0	2	0	0	0	X	3

Sheet A	1	2	3	4	5	6	7	8	Final
Thomas Scoffin (CAN); Kelsi Heath (NZL)	0	1	0	1	1	0	2	0	5
Mikhail Vaskov (RUS); Zuzana Hrůzová (CZE) 🔨	2	0	1	0	0	1	0	2	6

== Freestyle skiing ==
New Zealand qualified three athletes.

Freeski

Athlete	Event	Qualification				Final			
Athlete	Event	Run 1	Run 2	Best	Rank	Run 1	Run 2	Best	Rank
Samantha Poots	Girls' half-pipe	23.00	52.00	52.00	7	Did not advance			
Beau-James Wells	Boys' half-pipe	82.50	77.50	82.50	1 Q	85.50	83.75	85.50	4

Ski cross

Athlete	Event	Qualifying		Quarterfinals	Semifinals	Final
Athlete	Event	Time	Rank	Rank	Rank	Rank
Samuel Andrews	Boys' ski cross	1:02.74	18	Cancelled		

== Ice hockey ==
New Zealand qualified two athletes.

Athlete(s)	Event	Qualification		Final	
Athlete(s)	Event	Points	Rank	Points	Rank
Callum Burns	Boys' individual skills challenge	21	4 Q	19	4
Libby-Jean Hay	Girls' individual skills challenge	15	8 Q	12	8

== Luge ==
New Zealand qualified one athlete.

Athlete	Event	Run 1		Run 2		Total	
Athlete	Event	Time	Rank	Time	Rank	Time	Rank
Matheson Hill	Boys' singles	42.677	25	41.357	25	1:24.034	25

== Snowboarding ==
New Zealand qualified two athletes.

Athlete	Event	Qualification				Semifinal				Final			
Athlete	Event	Run 1	Run 2	Best	Rank	Run 1	Run 2	Best	Rank	Run 1	Run 2	Best	Rank
Hamish Bagley	Boys' halfpipe	58.50	64.75	64.75	10 q	40.50	68.50	68.50	5 Q	57.25	46.25	57.25	10
Hamish Bagley	Boys' slopestyle	DNS				—N/a				Did not advance			
Tim Herbert	Boys' slopestyle	44.50	57.00	57.00	21	—N/a				Did not advance			

== See also ==
- New Zealand at the 2012 Summer Olympics
