= Poland at the 2012 Winter Youth Olympics =

- IOC code: POL
- NOC: Polish Olympic Committee
- Website: www.pkol.pl

in Innsbruck
- Competitors: 19 in 7 sports
- Flag bearer: Urszula Letocha
- Medals: Gold 0 Silver 0 Bronze 0 Total 0

Winter Youth Olympics appearances
- 2012; 2016; 2020; 2024

Poland competed at the 2012 Winter Youth Olympics in Innsbruck, Austria.

== Alpine skiing ==
Boys

| Athlete | Event | Final | | | |
| Athlete | Event | Run 1 | Run 2 | Total | Rank |
|---|---|---|---|---|---|
| Andrzej Dziedzic | Slalom | DNF | | | |
| Andrzej Dziedzic | Giant slalom | 1:00.76 | 56.55 | 1:57.31 | 15 |
| Andrzej Dziedzic | Super-G | | | 1:07.98 | 23 |
| Andrzej Dziedzic | Combined | 1:05.69 | DNF | | |

Girls

| Athlete | Event | Final | | | |
| Athlete | Event | Run 1 | Run 2 | Total | Rank |
|---|---|---|---|---|---|
| Katarzyna Wasek | Slalom | 43.63 | DNF | | |
| Katarzyna Wasek | Giant slalom | 1:02.76 | 1:02.51 | 2:05.27 | 26 |
| Katarzyna Wasek | Super-G | | | DSQ | |
| Katarzyna Wasek | Combined | 1:10.14 | 38.44 | 1:48.58 | 19 |

== Biathlon ==
Boys

| Athlete | Event | Final | | |
| Athlete | Event | Time | Misses | Rank |
|---|---|---|---|---|
| Mateusz Janik | Sprint | 22:19.6 | 4 | 30 |
| Mateusz Janik | Pursuit | 34:33.2 | 7 | 33 |
| Jakub Topór | Sprint | 22:08.6 | 4 | 24 |
| Jakub Topór | Pursuit | 33:15.6 | 7 | 24 |

Girls

| Athlete | Event | Final | | |
| Athlete | Event | Time | Misses | Rank |
|---|---|---|---|---|
| Beata Lassak | Sprint | 20:56.1 | 4 | 34 |
| Beata Lassak | Pursuit | 34:19.9 | 8 | 30 |
| Kinga Mitoraj | Sprint | 19:58.2 | 3 | 24 |
| Kinga Mitoraj | Pursuit | 34:22.4 | 9 | 32 |

Mixed

| Athlete | Event | Final | | |
| Athlete | Event | Time | Misses | Rank |
|---|---|---|---|---|
| Kinga Mitoraj; Beata Lassak; Jakub Topór; Mateusz Janik | Mixed relay | 1:18:55.5 | 4+18 | 12 |
| Beata Lassak; Urszula Letocha; Jakub Topor; Dawid Bril | Cross-Country-Biathlon Mixed Relay | 1:11:40.6 | 4+6 | 18 |

== Cross country skiing ==
Boys

| Athlete | Event | Final | |
| Athlete | Event | Time | Rank |
|---|---|---|---|
| Dawid Bril | 10km classical | 31:27.8 | 15 |

Girls

| Athlete | Event | Final | |
| Athlete | Event | Time | Rank |
|---|---|---|---|
| Urszula Letocha | 5km classical | 16:22.3 | 16 |

Sprint

| Athlete | Event | Qualification | | Quarterfinal | | Semifinal | | Final | |
| Athlete | Event | Total | Rank | Total | Rank | Total | Rank | Total | Rank |
|---|---|---|---|---|---|---|---|---|---|
| Dawid Bril | Boys' sprint | 1:46.47 | 11 Q | 2:11.2 | 6 | did not advance | | | |
| Urszula Letocha | Girls' sprint | 2:05.81 | 22 Q | 2:02.4 | 5 | did not advance | | | |

Mixed

| Athlete | Event | Final | | |
| Athlete | Event | Time | Misses | Rank |
|---|---|---|---|---|
| Beata Lassak; Urszula Letocha; Jakub Topor; Dawid Bril | Cross-Country-Biathlon Mixed Relay | 1:11:40.6 | 4+6 | 18 |

== Luge ==
Boys

| Athlete | Event | Final | | | |
| Athlete | Event | Run 1 | Run 2 | Total | Rank |
|---|---|---|---|---|---|
| Jakub Firlej | Boys' singles | 41.243 | 41.325 | 1:22.568 | 22 |
| Jakub Firlej; Mateusz Woźniak | Boys' doubles | 43.498 | 43.805 | 1:27.303 | 9 |

Girls

| Athlete | Event | Final | | | |
| Athlete | Event | Run 1 | Run 2 | Total | Rank |
|---|---|---|---|---|---|
| Natalia Biesadzka | Girls' singles | 41.044 | 40.921 | 1:21.965 | 12 |

Team

| Athlete | Event | Final | | | | |
| Athlete | Event | Boys' | Girls' | Doubles | Total | Rank |
|---|---|---|---|---|---|---|
| Natalia Biesadzka; Jakub Kowalewski; Jakub Firlej; Mateusz Woźniak | Mixed Team Relay | 45.549 | 48.192 | 48.172 | 2:21.913 | 10 |

== Nordic combined ==
Individual

| Athlete | Event | Ski jumping | | Cross-country | | Final | |
| Athlete | Event | Points | Rank | Deficit | Ski Time | Total Time | Rank |
|---|---|---|---|---|---|---|---|
| Michal Pytel | Boys' individual | 120.8 | 10 | 1:07 | DNF | - | - |

== Ski jumping ==
Boys

| Athlete | Event | 1st Jump | | 2nd Jump | | Overall | |
| Athlete | Event | Distance | Points | Distance | Points | Points | Rank |
|---|---|---|---|---|---|---|---|
| Krzysztof Leja | Boys' individual | 64.5m | 101.1 | 66.0m | 105.2 | 206.3 | 14 |

Girls

| Athlete | Event | 1st Jump | | 2nd Jump | | Overall | |
| Athlete | Event | Distance | Points | Distance | Points | Points | Rank |
|---|---|---|---|---|---|---|---|
| Magdalena Palasz | Girls' individual | 40.5m | 34.5 | 43.5m | 43.2 | 77.7 | 14 |

Team w/Nordic Combined

| Athlete | Event | 1st Round | 2nd Round | Total | Rank |
|---|---|---|---|---|---|
| Magdalena Palasz; Michal Pytel; Krzysztof Leja | Mixed Team | 210.8 | 215.4 | 426.2 | 12 |

== Speed skating ==
Boys

| Athlete | Event | Race 1 | Race 2 | Total | Rank |
|---|---|---|---|---|---|
| Marcel Drwiega | Boys' 500 m | 40.36 | 39.94 | 80.30 | 8 |
| Marcel Drwiega | Boys' Mass Start | | | 7:51.71 | 20 |
| Arthur Iwaniszyn | Boys' 1500 m | | | 2:07.94 | 15 |
| Arthur Iwaniszyn | Boys' 3000 m | | | 4:30.06 | 11 |
| Arthur Iwaniszyn | Boys' Mass Start | | | 7:24.81 | 15 |

Girls

| Athlete | Event | Race 1 | Race 2 | Total | Rank |
|---|---|---|---|---|---|
| Kaja Ziomek | Girls' 500 m | 82.75 | 44.77 | 127.52 | 16 |
| Kaja Ziomek | Girls' 1500 m | | | 2:23.23 | 14 |
| Kaja Ziomek | Girls' Mass Start | | | 6:21.46 | 15 |
| Aleksandra Karpuziak | Girls' 1500 m | | | 2:17.29 | 10 |
| Aleksandra Karpuziak | Girls' 3000 m | | | 4:51.48 | 6 |
| Aleksandra Karpuziak | Girls' Mass Start | | | 6:22.03 | 16 |

== See also ==
- Poland at the 2012 Summer Olympics
