= Barbora Klementová =

Slovak cross-country skier (born 1994)

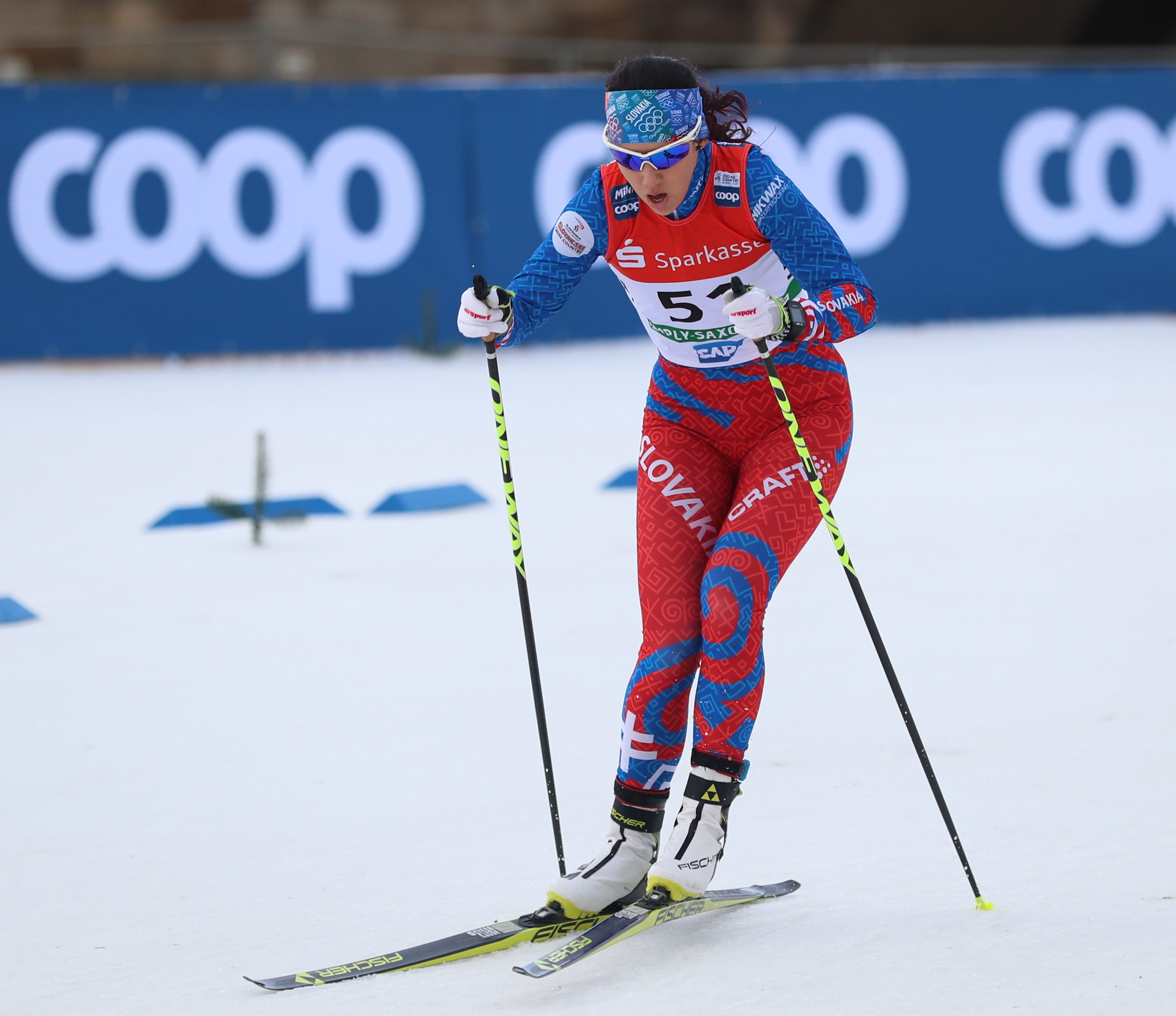
- Klementová in 2019

Personal information
- Nationality: Slovakia
- Born: 11 October 1994 (age 31) Levoča, Slovakia

Sport
- Sport: Skiing
- Club: KLNO

World Cup career
- Seasons: 3 – (2016, 2019, 2021–present)
- Indiv. starts: 4
- Indiv. podiums: 0
- Team starts: 4
- Team podiums: 0
- Overall titles: 0 – (123rd in 2021)
- Discipline titles: 0
- Updated on 4 November 2021

Barbora Klementová (born 11 October 1994) is a Slovak cross-country skier. She competed in the women's sprint at the 2018 Winter Olympics.

== Cross-country skiing results ==
All results are sourced from the International Ski Federation (FIS).

=== Olympic Games ===
Year	Age	10 km individual	15 km skiathlon	30 km mass start	Sprint	4 × 5 km relay	Team sprint
2018	23	—	—	—	53	—	18
2022	27	77	—	—	57	—	—

=== World Championships ===
Year	Age	10 km individual	15 km skiathlon	30 km mass start	Sprint	4 × 5 km relay	Team sprint
2015	20	—	—	—	47	—	13
2019	24	—	—	—	63	—	14
2021	26	69	—	—	59	—	14
2023	28	—	—	—	50	—	15

=== World Cup ===
==== Season standings ====
Season	Age	Discipline standings				Ski Tour standings			
Season	Age	Overall	Distance	Sprint	U23	Nordic Opening	Tour de Ski	World Cup Final	Ski Tour Canada
2016	21	NC	—	NC	NC	—	—	—N/a	—
2019	24	NC	—	NC	—N/a	—	—	—	—N/a
2021	26	123	—	83	—N/a	—	—	—N/a	—N/a
