= Florin Daniel Pripici =

Romanian cross-country skier (born 1995)

Florin Pripici
Personal information
- Born: March 7, 1995 (age 31) Sinaia, Romania

Sport
- Sport: Skiing

Florin Pripici (born March 7, 1995, in Sinaia) is a Romanian cross-country skier.

Pripici competed at the 2014 Winter Olympics for Romania. He placed 68th in the qualifying round in the individual sprint, failing to advance to the knockout stages. He also teamed with Paul Constantin Pepene in the team sprint, finishing 9th in their semifinal and failing to advance.

Pripici made his World Cup debut in January 2014. As of April 2014, his best finish is a 54th, in a freestyle sprint event at Szklarska Poreba in 2013–14.
