= 2012 Winter Youth Olympics national flag bearers =

The following is a list of national flagbearers for the 70 countries which took part in the 2012 Winter Youth Olympics.

Athletes entered the stadium in an order dictated by tradition. As the originator of the Olympics, Greece entered first. Austrian delegates entered last, representing the host nation. The delegations entered by German the official language of the host nation.

== List ==
Order	Nation	German	Flag bearer	Sport
1	Greece	Griechenland	Anastasia Gkogkou	Alpine skiing
2	Andorra	Andorra	Sara Ramentol	Alpine skiing
3	Argentina	Argentinien	Ramiro Fregonese	Alpine skiing
4	Armenia	Armenien	Lilit Tonoyan	Cross-country skiing
5	Australia	Australien	Greta Small	Alpine skiing
6	Belarus	Belarus	Anastasiya Lesik	Alpine skiing
7	Belgium	Belgien	Sebbe De Buck	Snowboarding
8	Bosnia and Herzegovina	Bosnien und Herzegovina	Kerim Catal	Luge
9	Brazil	Brasilien	Eliza Nobre	Alpine skiing
10	Bulgaria	Bulgarien	Aleksandra Popova	Alpine skiing
11	Chile	Chile	Sebastian Echeverría	Alpine skiing
12	China (People's Republic of China)	Volksrepublik China	Han Yan	Figure skating
13	Denmark	Dänemark	Philip Due Schmidt	Speed skating
14	Germany	Deutschland	Katharina Althaus	Ski jumping
15	Macedonia (Former Yugoslav Rep. of Macedonia)	Ehemalige Jugoslawische Republik Mazedonien	Marijan Nasoku	Alpine skiing
16	Eritrea	Eritrea	Shannon Abeda	Alpine skiing
17	Estonia	Estland	Rene Zahkna	Biathlon
18	Finland	Finnland	Katri Lylynperä	Cross-country skiing
19	France	Frankreich	Estelle Alphand	Alpine skiing
20	Georgia	Georgien	Susana Gavva	Alpine skiing
21	Great Britain	Grossbritannien	Katie Summerhayes	Freestyle skiing
22	India	Indien	Aanchal Thakur	Alpine skiing
23	Iran (Islamic Republic of Iran)	Islamische Republik Iran	Yaghoub Kiashemshaki	Cross-country skiing
24	Ireland	Irland	Florence Bell	Alpine skiing
25	Iceland	Island	Jakob Bjarnason	Alpine skiing
26	Italy	Italien	Florian Gruber	Luge
27	Japan	Japan	Sumire Kikuchi	Short track speed skating Speed skating
28	Cayman Islands	Kaimaninseln	Dean Travers	Alpine skiing
29	Canada	Kanada	Corryn Brown	Curling
30	Kazakhstan	Kasachstan	Kanat Khamitov	Ski jumping
31	Kyrgyzstan	Kirgisistan	Zafar Shakhmuratov	Cross-country skiing
32	South Korea (Rep. of Korea)	Republik Korea	Dong-Woo Kim	Alpine skiing
33	Croatia	Kroatien	Istok Rodeš	Alpine skiing
34	Latvia	Lettland	Ulla Zirne	Luge
35	Lebanon	Libanon	Alexandre Mohbat	Alpine skiing
36	Liechtenstein	Liechtenstein	Martin Vögeli	Cross-country skiing
37	Lithuania	Litauen	Rokas Zaveckas	Alpine skiing
38	Luxembourg	Luxemburg	Catherine Elvinger	Alpine skiing
39	Morocco	Marokko	Adam Lamhamedi	Alpine skiing
40	Mexico	Mexiko	Joshua Montiel Santander	Skeleton
41	Moldova (Rep. of Moldova)	Moldawien	Irina Cozonac	Biathlon
42	Monaco	Monaco	Rudy Rinaldi	Bobsleigh
43	Mongolia	Mongolei	Dandar Usukhbayar	Cross-country skiing
44	Montenegro	Montenegro	Milena Radojicic	Alpine skiing
45	Nepal	Nepal	Bibash Lama	Alpine skiing
46	New Zealand	New Zealand	Beau-James Wells	Freestyle skiing
47	Netherlands	Niederlande	Oldrik van der Aalst	Ski jumping
48	Norway	Norwegen	Ina Roll Backe	Curling
49	Peru	Peru	Isabella Todd	Alpine skiing
50	Philippines	Philippinen	Abel Tesfamariam	Alpine skiing
51	Poland	Polen	Urszula Letocha	Cross-country skiing
52	Romania	Rumänien	Daniel Pripici	Cross-country skiing
53	Russia	Russische Föderation	Sergey Mozgov	Figure skating
54	San Marino	San Marino	Vincenzo Michelotti	Alpine skiing
55	Sweden	Schweden	Linn Petersson	Hockey
56	Switzerland	Schweiz	Jasmina Suter	Alpine skiing
57	Serbia	Serbien	Dženis Avdić	Biathlon
58	Slovakia	Slowakei	Andrej Segec	Cross-country skiing
59	Slovenia	Slowenien	Tim-Kevin Ravnjak	Snowboarding
60	Spain	Spanien	Manex Azula	Snowboarding
61	South Africa	Südafrika	Sive Speelman	Alpine skiing
62	Chinese Taipei	Chinese Taipei	Lien Te-An	Luge
63	Czech Republic	Tschechische Republik	Petr Knop	Cross-country skiing
64	Turkey	Türkei	Dila Kavur	Alpine skiing
65	Ukraine	Ukraine	Anton Dukach	Luge
66	Hungary	Ungarn	David Panyik	Biathlon
67	Uzbekistan	Usbekistan	Arkadiy Semenchenko	Alpine skiing
68	United States	Vereinigte Staaten von Amerika	Jake Peterson	Bobsleigh
69	Cyprus	Zypern	Dinos Lefkaritis	Alpine skiing
70	Austria	Österreich	Tamara Grascher	Hockey
