= Alpine skiing at the 2012 Winter Youth Olympics – Girls' slalom =

Girls' slalom at the I Winter Youth Olympic Games
- Venue: Patscherkofel
- Date: January 20
- Competitors: 54 from 47 nations
- Winning time: 1:19.76

Medalists
1st place, gold medalist(s)		Petra Vlhová	Slovakia
2nd place, silver medalist(s)		Roni Remme	Canada
3rd place, bronze medalist(s)		Ekaterina Tkachenko	Russia

The girls' slalom competition of the alpine skiing events at the 2012 Winter Youth Olympics in Innsbruck, Austria, was held on January 20, at the Patscherkofel. 54 athletes from 47 different countries took part in this event.

== Results ==
Rank	Bib	Name	Country	Run 1	Run 2	Total	Difference
1st place, gold medalist(s)	5	Petra Vlhová	Slovakia	40.71	39.05	1:19.76	
2nd place, silver medalist(s)	19	Roni Remme	Canada	42.05	39.20	1:21.25	+1.49
3rd place, bronze medalist(s)	1	Ekaterina Tkachenko	Russia	42.39	39.23	1:21.62	+1.86
4	13	Jasmina Suter	Switzerland	42.38	39.26	1:21.64	+1.88
5	9	Jasmine Fiorano	Italy	42.60	39.41	1:22.01	+2.25
6	4	Estelle Alphand	France	42.76	39.46	1:22.22	+2.46
7	7	Greta Small	Australia	43.83	40.41	1:24.24	+ 4.48
8	17	Helga María Vilhjálmsdóttir	Iceland	45.63	39.29	1:24.92	+5.16
9	15	Saša Brezovnik	Slovenia	46.93	39.12	1:26.05	+6.29
10	20	Dominika Drozdíková	Czech Republic	45.79	40.59	1:26.38	+6.62
11	25	Claudia Seidl	Slovenia	45.75	40.75	1:26.50	+6.74
12	27	Julia Mueller-Ristine	United States	46.48	41.31	1:27.79	+8.03
13	28	Olivia Schoultz	Finland	46.09	41.86	1:27.95	+8.19
14	36	Triin Tobi	Estonia	46.74	42.73	1:29.47	+9.71
15	34	Piera Hudson	New Zealand	47.93	41.69	1:29.62	+9.86
16	35	Agnese Āboltiņa	Latvia	48.41	42.87	1:31.28	+11.52
17	39	Anastasiya Lesik	Belarus	47.56	44.63	1:32.19	+12.43
18	40	Catherine Elvinger	Luxembourg	48.25	44.73	1:32.98	+13.22
19	44	Milena Radojičić	Montenegro	49.46	45.00	1:34.46	+14.70
20	54	Nada Zvizdić	Bosnia and Herzegovina	51.33	44.09	1:35.42	+5.66
21	42	Anastasia Gkogkou	Greece	50.00	46.15	1:36.15	+16.39
22	48	Susana Gavva	Georgia	49.94	46.46	1:36.40	+16.64
23	52	Zsuzsanna Úry	Hungary	51.11	46.79	1:37.90	+18.14
24	41	Florence Bell	Ireland	51.71	46.35	1:38.06	+18.30
25	46	Julie Faarup	Denmark	53.20	49.14	1:42.34	+22.58
26	47	Dila Kavur	Turkey	53.74	49.08	1:42.82	+23.06
27	50	Aanchal Thakur	India	1:06.70	1:02.76	2:09.46	+49.70
28	51	Isabella Todd	Peru	1:43.15	1:38.85	3:22.00	+2:02.24
	2	Christina Ager	Austria	41.89	DNF		
	3	Nora Grieg Christensen	Norway	43.08	DNF		
	10	Saša Tršinski	Croatia	41.95	DNF		
	14	Luana Flütsch	Switzerland	41.61	DNF		
	23	Jenny Reinold	Germany	43.90	DNF		
	29	Katarzyna Wąsek	Poland	43.63	DNF		
	33	Anastasiia Gorbunova	Ukraine	48.73	DNF		
	53	Eliza Nobre	Brazil	59.91	DSQ		
	6	Magdalena Fjaellstroem	Sweden	DNF			
	8	Clara Direz	France	DNF			
	11	Martina Rettenwender	Austria	DNF			
	12	Veronica Olivieri	Italy	DNF			
	16	Mikaela Tommy	Canada	DNF			
	18	Adriana Jelinkova	Netherlands	DNF			
	21	Rachelle Rogers	Great Britain	DNF			
	22	Kayo Denda	Japan	DNF			
	24	Alisa Krauss	Germany	DNF			
	26	Jo Eun−hwa	South Korea	DNF			
	30	Ona Rocamora	Spain	DNF			
	31	Aleksandra Popova	Bulgaria	DNF			
	32	Delfina Costantini	Argentina	DNF			
	37	Sara Ramentol	Andorra	DNF			
	38	Macarena Montesinos	Chile	DNF			
	43	Laura Pamerneckytė	Lithuania	DNF			
	45	Celine Kairouz	Lebanon	DNF			
	49	Mariya Grigorova	Kazakhstan	DNF			
