= Alpine skiing at the 2012 Winter Youth Olympics – Girls' giant slalom =

Girls' giant slalom at the I Winter Youth Olympic Games
- Venue: Patscherkofel
- Date: January 18
- Competitors: 53 from 46 nations
- Winning time: 1:56.13

Medalists
1st place, gold medalist(s)		Clara Direz	France
2nd place, silver medalist(s)		Estelle Alphand	France
3rd place, bronze medalist(s)		Jasmina Suter	Switzerland

The girls' giant slalom competition of the alpine skiing events at the 2012 Winter Youth Olympics in Innsbruck, Austria, was held on January 18, at the Patscherkofel. 55 athletes from 48 different countries took part in this event.

== Results ==
Rank	Bib	Name	Country	Run 1	Run 2	Total	Difference
1st place, gold medalist(s)	6	Clara Direz	France	57.58	58.55	1:56.13	
2nd place, silver medalist(s)	2	Estelle Alphand	France	57.69	58.65	1:56.34	+0.21
3rd place, bronze medalist(s)	11	Jasmina Suter	Switzerland	57.74	58.71	1:56.45	+0.32
4	5	Petra Vlhová	Slovakia	57.35	59.16	1:56.51	+0.38
5	1	Magdalena Fjaellstroem	Sweden	57.14	59.45	1:56.59	+0.46
6	8	Adriana Jelinkova	Netherlands	58.34	58.63	1:56.97	+0.84
7	4	Ekaterina Tkachenko	Russia	58.61	59.41	1:58.02	+1.89
8	14	Luana Flütsch	Switzerland	58.70	59.71	1:58.41	+2.28
9	12	Christina Ager	Austria	58.90	1:00.23	1:59.13	+3.00
10	18	Saša Brezovnik	Slovenia	59.26	59.91	1:59.17	+3.04
11	19	Saša Tršinski	Croatia	59.40	1:00.16	1:59.56	+3.43
12	16	Veronica Olivieri	Italy	59.86	59.95	1:59.81	+3.68
13	13	Greta Small	Australia	59.56	1:00.34	1:59.90	+3.77
14	15	Alisa Krauss	Germany	1:00.13	59.84	1:59.97	+3.84
15	20	Roni Remme	Canada	1:00.04	1:00.03	2:00.07	+3.94
16	22	Dominika Drozdíková	Czech Republic	59.97	1:00.84	2:00.81	+4.68
17	17	Jasmine Fiorano	Italy	59.25	1:01.77	2:01.02	+4.89
18	25	Jenny Reinold	Germany	1:00.73	1:00.54	2:01.27	+5.14
19	31	Aleksandra Popova	Bulgaria	1:00.62	1:00.82	2:01.44	+5.31
20	33	Claudia Seidl	Slovenia	1:01.07	1:00.71	2:01.78	+5.65
21	24	Helga María Vilhjálmsdóttir	Iceland	1:00.31	1:01.75	2:02.06	+5.93
22	32	Ona Rocamora	Spain	1:01.12	1:01.38	2:02.50	+6.37
23	10	Kayo Denda	Japan	1:00.99	1:01.68	2:02.67	+6.54
24	29	Julia Mueller-Ristine	United States	1:01.86	1:01.31	2:03.17	+7.04
25	28	Olivia Schoultz	Finland	1:02.51	1:02.37	2:04.88	+8.75
26	39	Katarzyna Wąsek	Poland	1:02.76	1:02.51	2:05.27	+9.14
27	30	Triin Tobi	Estonia	1:03.49	1:03.18	2:06.67	+10.54
28	23	Jo Eun−hwa	South Korea	1:03.30	1:04.07	2:07.37	+11.24
29	38	Catherine Elvinger	Luxembourg	1:03.44	1:04.16	2:07.60	+11.47
30	34	Anastasiia Gorbunova	Ukraine	1:04.42	1:04.52	2:08.94	+12.81
31	41	Nada Zvizdić	Bosnia and Herzegovina	1:06.88	1:07.66	2:14.54	+18.41
32	45	Susana Gavva	Georgia	1:07.73	1:07.28	2:15.01	+18.88
33	43	Zsuzsanna Úry	Hungary	1:06.85	1:09.02	2:15.87	+19.74
34	42	Florence Bell	Ireland	1:06.73	1:09.33	2:16.06	+19.93
35	44	Anastasia Gkogkou	Greece	1:08.07	1:09.06	2:17.13	+21.00
36	53	Laura Pamerneckytė	Lithuania	1:08.12	1:09.30	2:17.42	+21.29
37	46	Julie Faarup	Denmark	1:09.41	1:09.56	2:18.97	+22.84
38	50	Dila Kavur	Turkey	1:10.13	1:10.75	2:20.88	+24.75
39	49	Celine Kairouz	Lebanon	1:11.26	1:11.30	2:22.56	+26.43
40	48	Mariya Grigorova	Kazakhstan	1:10.94	1:11.75	2:22.69	+26.56
41	47	Milena Radojičić	Montenegro	1:12.80	1:10.99	2:23.79	+27.66
42	52	Eliza Nobre	Brazil	1:10.76	1:13.54	2:24.30	+28.17
43	54	Aanchal Thakur	India	1:23.83	1:24.88	2:48.71	+52.58
	3	Mikaela Tommy	Canada	57.69	DNF		
	9	Martina Rettenwender	Austria	59.33	DNF		
	21	Piera Hudson	New Zealand	1:00.51	DNF		
	26	Delfina Costantini	Argentina	1:00.96	DNF		
	27	Macarena Montesinos	Chile	1:03.67	DNF		
	35	Rachelle Rogers	Great Britain	1:03.61	DNF		
	7	Nora Grieg Christensen	Norway	DNF			
	40	Agnese Āboltiņa	Latvia	DNF			
	36	Sara Ramentol	Andorra	DSQ			
	37	Anastasiya Lesik	Belarus	DSQ			
	51	Hadis Ahmadi	Iran	DNS			
	55	Isabella Todd	Peru	DNS			
