= Curling at the 2012 Winter Youth Olympics =

Curling at the I Winter Youth Olympic Games
- Venue: Innsbruck Exhibition Centre
- Dates: 14–22 January
- Competitors: 64 from 16 nations

Curling was contested at the 2012 Winter Youth Olympics at the Innsbruck Exhibition Centre in Innsbruck, Austria from 14 January to 22 January. The mixed team event took place from 14 January to 18 January, while the mixed doubles tournament took place from 20 January to 22 January.

The Athlete Role Models for the Youth Olympics curling competition were Eve Muirhead of Great Britain and Uli Kapp of Germany.

== Medal summary ==
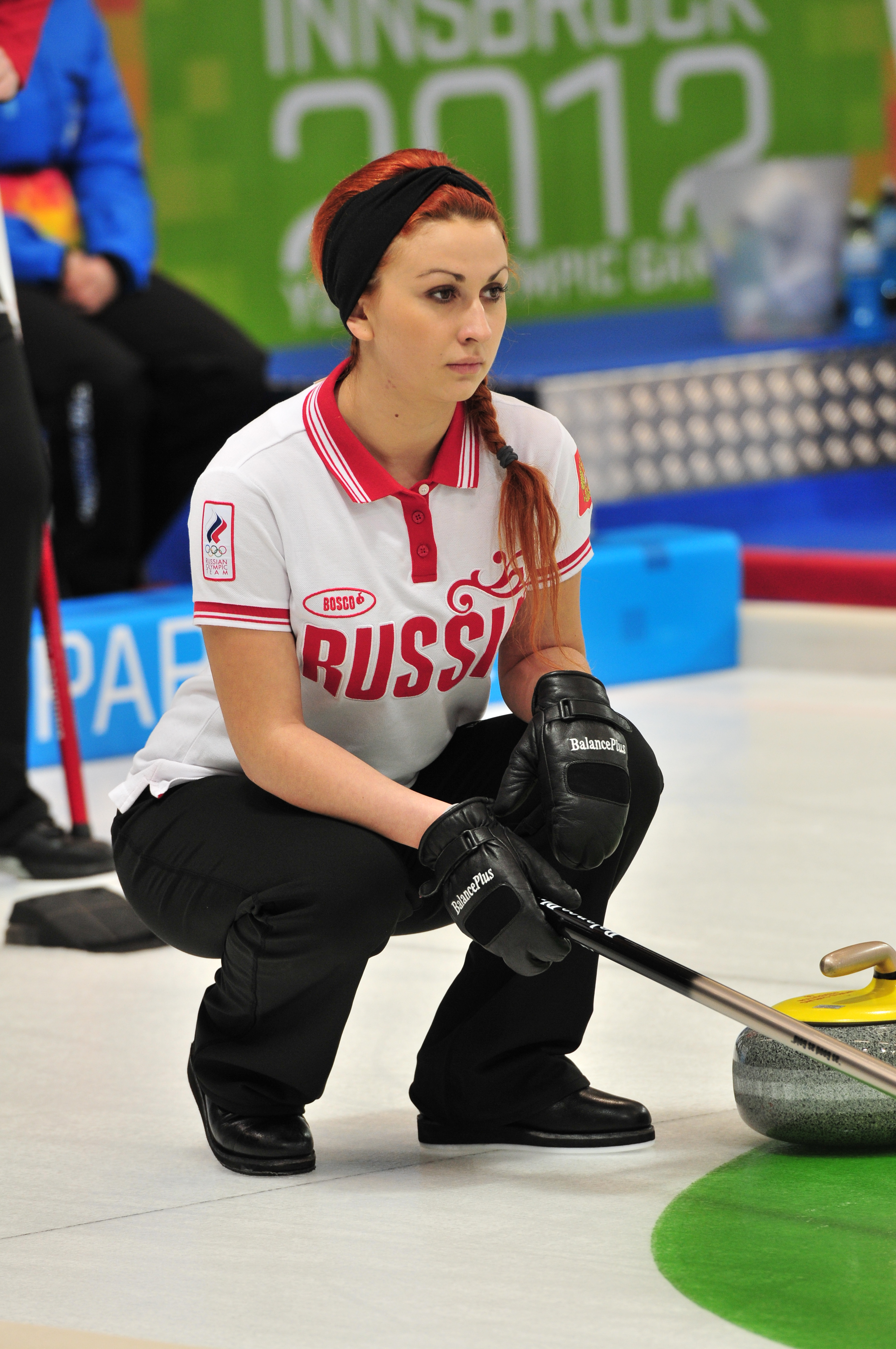
Anastasia Moskaleva

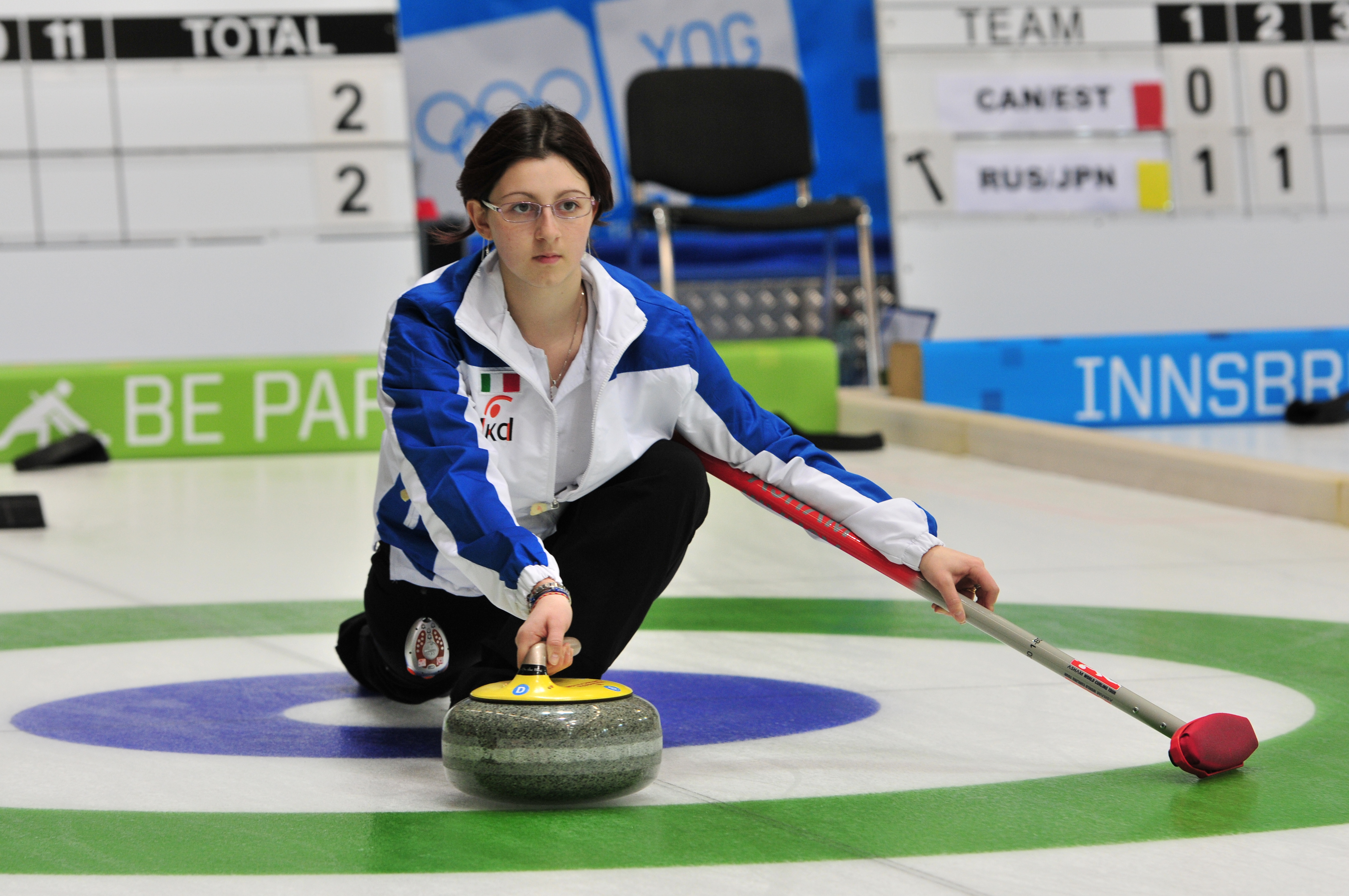
Denise Pimpini

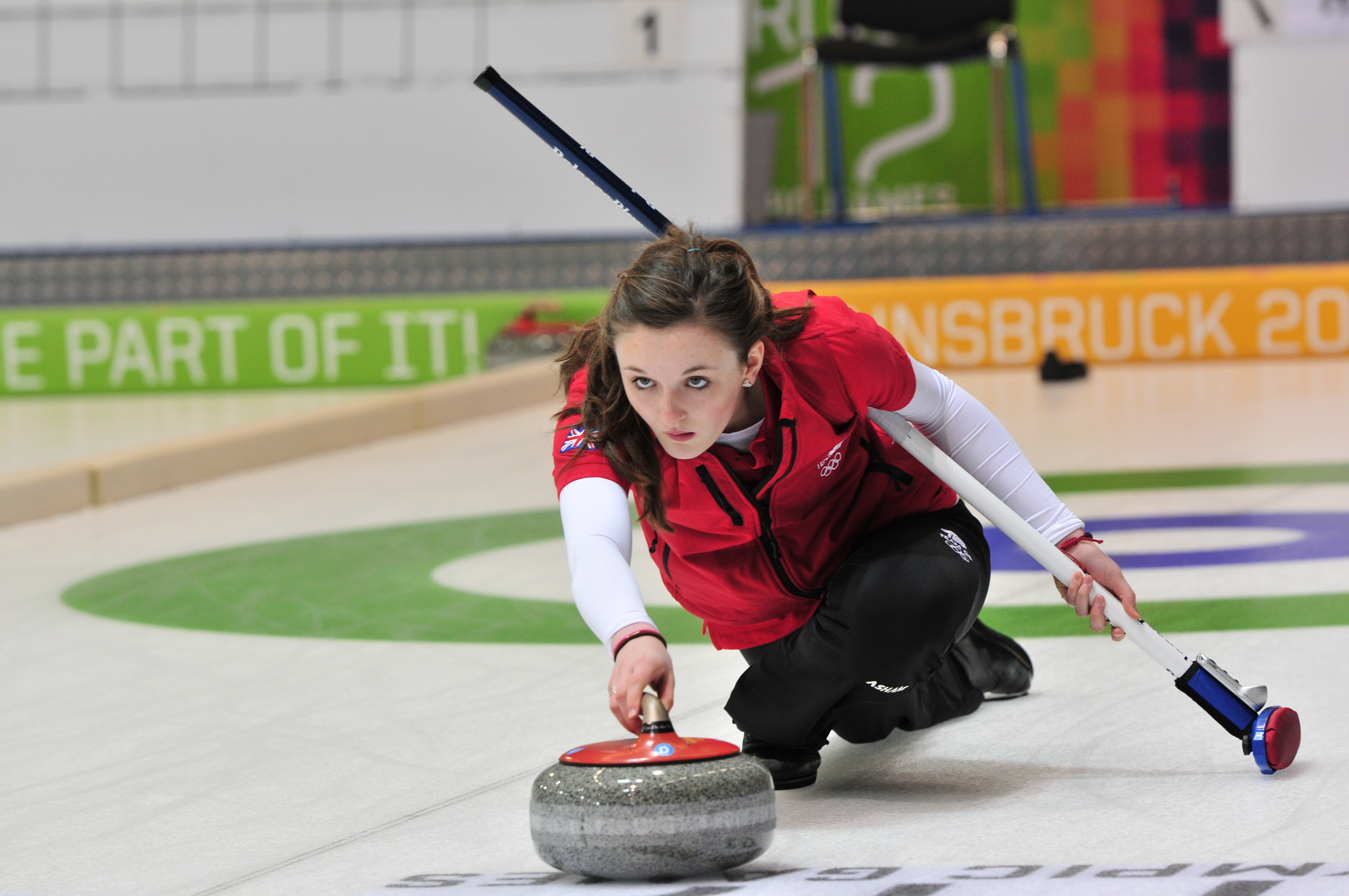
Rachel Hannen

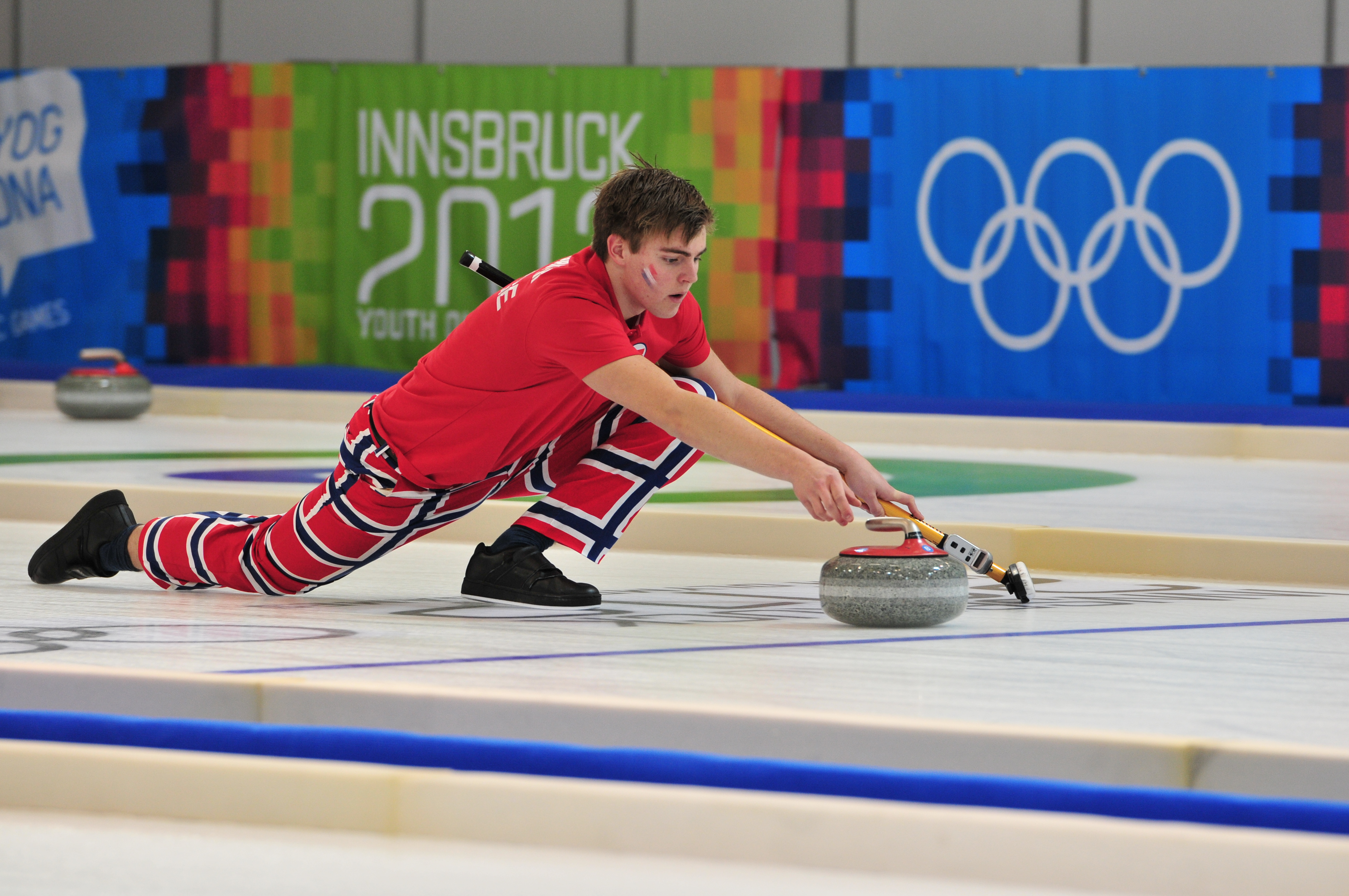
Martin Sesaker

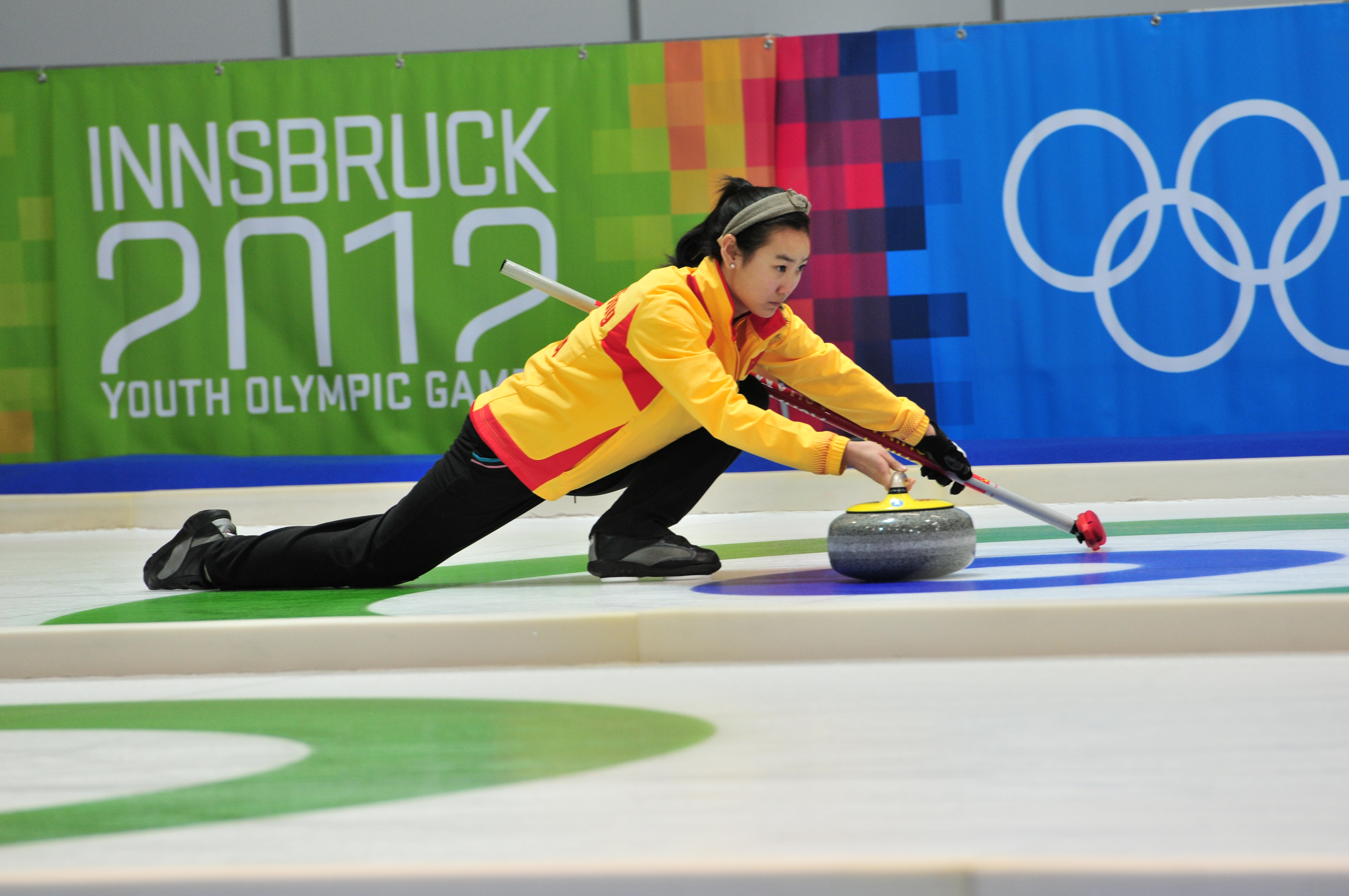
Mako Tamakuma

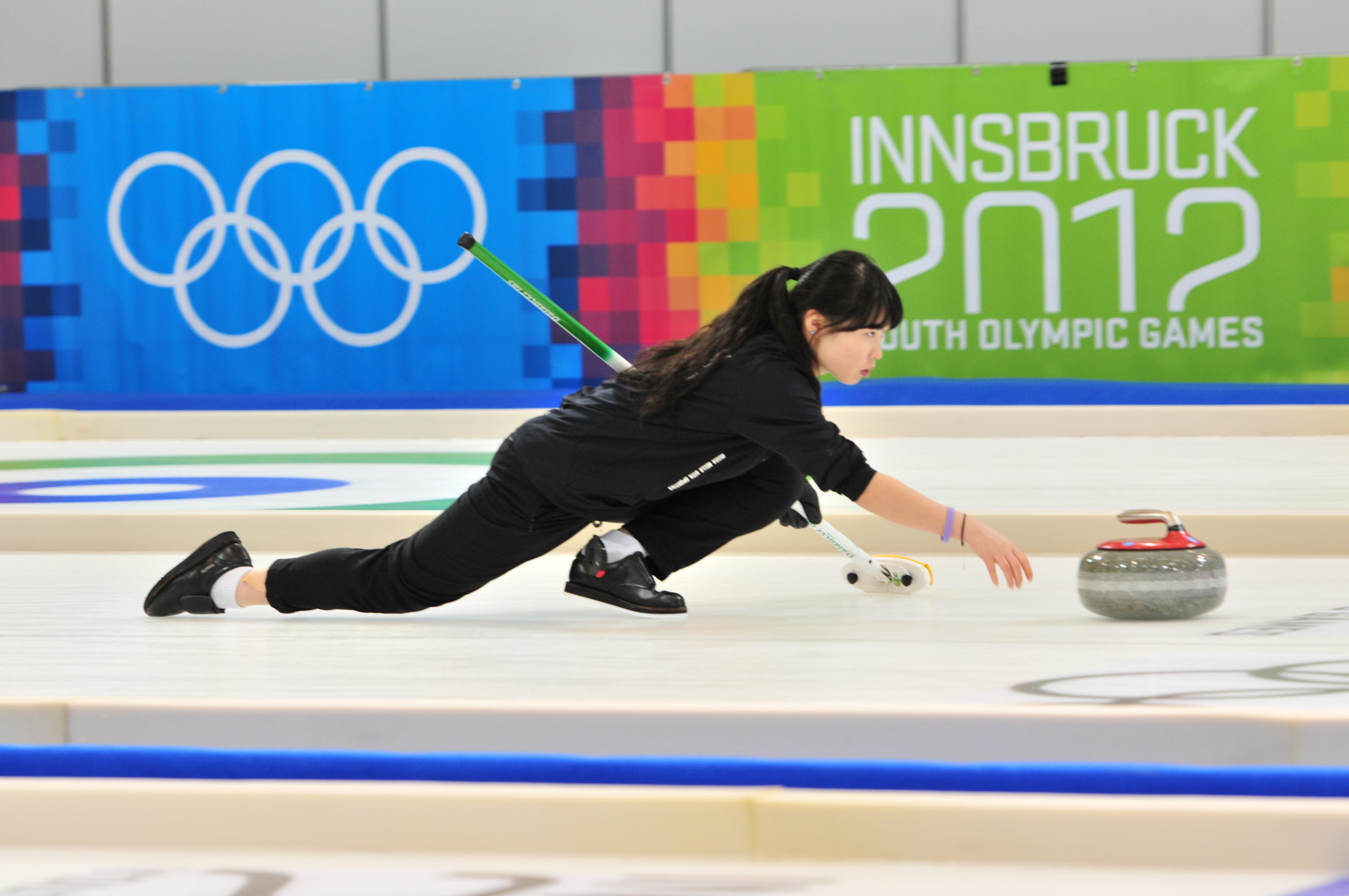
Kim Eunbi

=== Medal table ===
| Rank | Nation | Gold | Silver | Bronze | Total |
|---|---|---|---|---|---|
| – | Mixed-NOCs | 1 | 1 | 1 | 3 |
| 1 | Switzerland | 1 | 0 | 0 | 1 |
| 2 | Italy | 0 | 1 | 0 | 1 |
| 3 | Canada | 0 | 0 | 1 | 1 |
| Totals (3 entries) | | 2 | 2 | 2 | 6 |

=== Events ===
| Games | Gold | Silver | Bronze |
|---|---|---|---|
| Mixed team | Switzerland; Michael Brunner; Elena Stern; Romano Meier; Lisa Gisler | Italy; Amos Mosaner; Denise Pimpini; Alessandro Zoppi; Arianna Losano | Canada; Thomas Scoffin; Corryn Brown; Derek Oryniak; Emily Gray |
| Mixed doubles | Michael Brunner (SUI); Nicole Muskatewitz (GER) | Martin Sesaker (NOR); Kim Eun-bi (KOR) | Korey Dropkin (USA); Marina Verenich (RUS) |

== Format of play ==
At the 2012 Winter Youth Olympics, there were two tournaments and two sets of medals awarded for each tournament. There was a mixed team curling tournament and a mixed doubles curling tournament.

=== Mixed team curling ===
The mixed team curling teams consisted of two boys and two girls from the same NOC/country.

The sixteen qualified teams competed in two divisions of round robin play. The top four teams from each group advanced to the quarterfinals, where the teams played a single knockout tournament to determine the winner.

=== Mixed NOC doubles curling ===
The mixed NOC doubles curling teams consisted of one boy and one girl from different NOCs. The purpose of mixed-NOCs in mixed doubles was to encourage an international sense of community.

The mixed doubles competition took place after the mixed team competition; the same athletes competing in the mixed event competed in the mixed doubles event. The mixed doubles teams was selected by the organizing committee based on the final rankings from the mixed team competition. The resulting 32 teams played a single knockout round to determine the winner.

== Qualification ==
To qualify, countries gain points at the European Junior Curling Challenge, Pacific Junior Curling Championships, and the 2011 World Junior Curling Championships. The NOC then determines the composition of the mixed team, which will consist of two junior women and two junior men curlers.

=== Summary ===
| Region | Vacancies | Qualified |
|---|---|---|
| Host Nation | 1 | Austria |
| North America^{1} | 2 | Canada; United States |
| South America^{1} | 1 | ~~Brazil~~^{3} |
| Asia^{2} | 3 | Japan; China; South Korea |
| Oceania | 1 | New Zealand |
| Europe | 8 | Norway; Sweden; Great Britain; Switzerland; Czech Republic; Russia; Germany; Italy^{3} Estonia^{4} ~~Finland~~^{4} |
| TOTAL | 16 | |

=== Qualification points ===
Qualified teams in bold

| Region | Countries | Points for qualification | | | | | | |
| Region | Countries | EJCC Women | EJCC Men | PJCC Women | PJCC Men | WJCC Women | WJCC Men | Total |
|---|---|---|---|---|---|---|---|---|
| Host Nation | **Austria** | Not required | | | | | | |
| North America^{1} | **Canada** | | | | | 18 | 15 | 33 |
| North America^{1} | **United States** | | | | | 14 | 13 | 27 |
| South America^{1} | ~~Brazil~~^{3} | | | | | | | 0 |
| Asia^{2} | **Japan** | | | 10 | 6 | 11 | | 27 |
| Asia^{2} | **China** | | | 4 | 10 | | 12 | 26 |
| Asia^{2} | **South Korea** | | | 8 | 8 | | | 16 |
| Oceania | **New Zealand** | | | 6 | 4 | | | 10 |
| Oceania | Australia | | | 2 | 2 | | | 4 |
| Europe | **Norway** | 10 | | | | 12 | 16 | 38 |
| Europe | **Sweden** | | | | | 15 | 20 | 35 |
| Europe | **Great Britain** | | | | | 20 | 14 | 34 |
| Europe | **Switzerland** | | | | | 14 | 18 | 32 |
| Europe | **Czech Republic** | | 10 | | | 10 | 10 | 30 |
| Europe | **Russia** | | 8 | | | | 16 | 24 |
| Europe | **Germany** | 8 | 5 | | | | | 13 |
| Europe | **Italy**^{3} | 6 | 2 | | | | | 8 |
| Europe | **Estonia**^{4} | 2 | 6 | | | | | 8 |
| Europe | ~~Finland~~^{4} | | | | | | 11 | 11 |
| Europe | Poland | 3 | 4 | | | | | 7 |
| Europe | Denmark | 5 | | | | | 0 | 5 |
| Europe | Spain | 4 | 1 | | | | | 5 |
| Europe | Netherlands | | 3 | | | | | 3 |
| Europe | Slovakia | 1 | 0 | | | | | 1 |
| Europe | France | | 0 | | | 0 | | 0 |

Notes

^^{1} The North American and South American teams are qualified automatically by virtue of their affiliation with the World Curling Federation, since the number of qualification spots equals the number of nations affiliated with the WCF.
^^{2} The Asian teams are qualified as no more than three nations affiliated in the region chose to participate.
^^{3} Brazil declined the invitation to the Winter Youth Olympics, so Italy were invited to replace Brazil, per Italy's World Curling Ranking.
^^{4} Finland withdrew from the Winter Youth Olympics, so Estonia accepted an invitation to replace Finland, per Estonia's qualification ranking.
