= Snowboarding at the 2012 Winter Youth Olympics =

Snowboarding at the I Winter Youth Olympic Games
- Venue: Nordkette Innsbruck and Kuhtai; Igls, Innsbruck
- Dates: 14–19 January
- Competitors: 60

Snowboarding at the 2012 Winter Youth Olympics was held at the Nordkette Innsbruck and Kuhtai in Igls, Innsbruck, Austria from 14 to 19 January.

== Medal summary ==
=== Medal table ===
Rank	Nation	Gold	Silver	Bronze	Total
1	Canada	2	0	0	2
2	United States	1	3	0	4
3	Japan	1	0	1	2
4	Slovenia	0	1	0	1
5	Australia	0	0	1	1
5	France	0	0	1	1
5	Switzerland	0	0	1	1
Totals (7 entries)		4	4	4	12

=== Boys' Events ===
Event	Gold		Silver		Bronze	
Boys' halfpipe	Ben Ferguson; United States	93.25	Tim-Kevin Ravnjak; Slovenia	86.75	Taku Hiraoka; Japan	84.25
Boys' slopestyle	Michael Ciccarelli; Canada	94.25	Ben Ferguson; United States	90.25	David Hablützel; Switzerland	87.50

=== Girls' Events ===
Event	Gold		Silver		Bronze	
Girls' halfpipe	Hikaru Ōe; Japan	96.25	Arielle Gold; United States	90.00	Lucile Lefevre; France	82.25
Girls' slopestyle	Audrey McManiman; Canada	84.25	Arielle Gold; United States	71.75	Alexandra Fitch; Australia	69.75

== Qualification summary ==
NOC	Boys'		Girls'		Total
NOC	Half-pipe	Slopestyle	Half-pipe	Slopestyle	Total
Andorra				1	1
Australia				1	1
Austria	1	1	1	1	4
Belgium	1	1			2
Canada	1	1	1	1	4
Chile		1			1
Croatia			1	1	2
Czech Republic		1	1	1	3
Finland	1	1	1	1	4
France	1	1	1	1	4
Germany	1				1
Hungary		1			1
Italy	1	1	1	1	4
Japan	1		1		2
Netherlands	1	1			2
New Zealand	1	1			2
Poland			1		1
Russia	1	1	1	1	4
Slovenia	1	1			2
South Korea	1		1		2
Spain	1		1		2
Sweden		1			1
Switzerland	1	1	1		3
United States	1	1	1	1	4
Total: 24 NOCs	16	16	14	11	57
