= Cayman Islands at the 2012 Winter Youth Olympics =

- IOC code: CAY
- NOC: Cayman Islands Olympic Committee

in Innsbruck
- Competitors: 1 in 1 sport
- Flag bearer: Dean Travers
- Medals: Gold 0 Silver 0 Bronze 0 Total 0

Winter Youth Olympics appearances
- 2012; 2016–2024

The Cayman Islands competed at the 2012 Winter Youth Olympics in Innsbruck, Austria. The Cayman Islands team was made up of one athlete, an alpine skier.

== Alpine skiing ==
The Cayman Islands has qualified one boy in alpine skiing. Dean Travers is the younger brother of Dow Travers, who competed for the Cayman Islands at the 2010 Winter Olympics in Vancouver, British Columbia, Canada the nations debut at a Winter Olympics. While formally listed to compete Dean Travers was not listed in any events.

== See also ==
- Cayman Islands at the 2012 Summer Olympics
