= Biathlon at the 2012 Winter Youth Olympics – Boys' sprint =

Boys' sprint at the I Winter Youth Olympic Games
- Venue: Seefeld Arena
- Date: 15 January
- Competitors: 50 from 30 nations

Medalists
1st place, gold medalist(s)		Cheng Fangming	China
2nd place, silver medalist(s)		Rene Zahkna	Estonia
3rd place, bronze medalist(s)		Aristide Bègue	France

The boys' sprint competition of the biathlon events at the 2012 Winter Youth Olympics in Innsbruck, Austria, was held on January 15, at Seefeld Arena. 50 athletes from 30 countries took part. The race was 7.5 km in length.

== Results ==
The race started at 14:30.

Rank	Bib	Name	Country	Time	Penalties (P+S)	Deficit
1st place, gold medalist(s)	30	Cheng Fangming	China	19:21.7	1 (0+1)	—
2nd place, silver medalist(s)	17	Rene Zahkna	Estonia	19:43.0	1 (0+1)	+21.3
3rd place, bronze medalist(s)	22	Aristide Bègue	France	19:48.5	1 (1+0)	+26.8
4	20	Stuart Harden	Canada	19:51.3	0 (0+0)	+29.6
5	11	Kristian André Aalerud	Norway	20:04.4	2 (2+0)	+42.7
6	46	Niklas Homberg	Germany	20:05.4	1 (0+1)	+43.7
7	5	Maksym Ivko	Ukraine	20:28.4	3 (1+2)	+1:06.7
8	23	Adam Václavík	Czech Republic	20:32.5	1 (0+1)	+1:10.8
9	38	Håkon Livik	Norway	20:34.1	1 (0+1)	+1:12.4
10	33	Michael Pfeffer	Austria	20:35.3	3 (2+1)	+1:13.6
11	12	Xavier Guidetti	Italy	20:40.2	2 (1+1)	+1:18.5
12	37	Sean Doherty	United States	20:47.5	3 (2+1)	+1:25.8
13	43	Viktar Kryuko	Belarus	20:53.0	2 (2+0)	+1:31.3
14	10	Maximilian Janke	Germany	20:57.8	2 (1+1)	+1:36.1
15	44	Federico Di Francesco	Italy	20:59.4	2 (2+0)	+1:37.7
16	25	Fabien Claude	France	21:05.9	4 (1+3)	+1:44.2
17	14	Miha Dovžan	Slovenia	21:10.2	3 (0+3)	+1:48.5
18	9	Jules Cuenot	Switzerland	21:18.4	4 (2+2)	+1:56.7
19	7	Matej Burić	Croatia	21:28.3	2 (2+0)	+2:06.6
20	50	Tarvi Sikk	Estonia	21:29.5	2 (0+2)	+2:07.8
21	31	Vid Zabret	Slovenia	21:39.3	3 (1+2)	+2:17.6
22	36	Dmytro Ihnatyev	Ukraine	21:39.9	3 (2+1)	+2:18.2
23	49	Ondřej Hošek	Czech Republic	21:55.5	3 (2+1)	+2:33.8
24	42	Jakub Topór	Poland	22:08.6	4 (4+0)	+2:46.9
25	16	Aleksey Kuznetsov	Russia	22:14.1	4 (3+1)	+2:52.4
26	27	Kenneth Schöpfer	Switzerland	22:14.2	4 (1+3)	+2:52.5
27	2	Heikki Laitinen	Finland	22:14.3	2 (2+0)	+2:52.6
28	3	Thorsten Bischof	Austria	22:17.7	4 (3+1)	+2:56.0
29	18	Niklas Forsberg	Sweden	22:19.4	5 (1+4)	+2:57.7
30	21	Mateusz Janik	Poland	22:19.6	4 (1+3)	+2:57.9
31	28	Ruslan Bessov	Kazakhstan	22:19.8	4 (2+2)	+2:58.1
32	24	Nick Proell	United States	22:21.8	2 (1+1)	+3:00.1
33	26	Mattias Jonsson	Sweden	22:23.2	3 (2+1)	+3:01.5
34	1	Radi Palevski	Bulgaria	22:23.9	3 (1+2)	+3:02.2
35	45	Calum Irvine	Great Britain	22:28.5	5 (3+2)	+3:06.8
36	32	Antti Repo	Finland	22:30.0	5 (2+3)	+3:08.3
37	41	Marius Ungureanu	Romania	22:30.4	3 (2+1)	+3:08.7
38	8	Choi Du-jin	South Korea	22:35.8	3 (2+1)	+3:14.4
39	6	Raman Malukha	Belarus	22:38.4	4 (2+2)	+3:16.7
40	29	Ivan Galushkin	Russia	22:41.4	5 (1+4)	+3:19.7
41	4	Ondrej Kosztolányi	Slovakia	22:48.5	4 (3+1)	+3:26.8
42	48	Denislav Shehtanov	Bulgaria	22:49.1	4 (2+2)	+3:27.4
43	40	Aidan Millar	Canada	23:23.1	7 (4+3)	+4:01.4
44	47	Peter Oravec	Slovakia	23:48.0	5 (3+2)	+4:26.3
45	39	Jānis Slavēns	Latvia	23:50.9	2 (1+1)	+4:29.2
46	35	Arnoldas Mikelkevičius	Lithuania	24:02.1	5 (2+3)	+4:40.4
47	19	Dženis Avdić	Serbia	24:18.5	7 (3+4)	+4:56.8
48	13	David Panyik	Hungary	24:25.9	5 (2+3)	+5:04.2
49	15	Linards Zēmelis	Latvia	25:11.0	5 (2+3)	+5:49.3
50	34	Lachlan Porter	Australia	26:21.1	4 (2+2)	+6:59.4
