= Ireland at the 2012 Winter Youth Olympics =

- IOC code: IRL
- NOC: Olympic Council of Ireland
- Website: www.olympicsport.ie

in Innsbruck
- Competitors: 1 in 1 sport
- Flag bearer: Florence Bell
- Medals: Gold 0 Silver 0 Bronze 0 Total 0

Winter Youth Olympics appearances
- 2012; 2016; 2020; 2024

Ireland competed at the 2012 Winter Youth Olympics in Innsbruck, Austria. The Irish team consisted of three officials and one athlete, a female alpine skier.

== Alpine skiing ==
Ireland had only one entry in the 2012 Winter Youth Olympics

Girl

Athlete	Event	Run 1	Run 2	Total	Rank
Florence Bell	Girls' slalom	51.71	46.35	1:38.06	24
Florence Bell	Girls' giant slalom	1:06.73	1:09.33	2:16.06	34

== See also ==
- Ireland at the 2012 Summer Olympics
