= Ice hockey at the 2012 Winter Youth Olympics – Girls' individual skills challenge =

Girls' individual skills challenge at the I Winter Youth Olympic Games
- Venue: Tyrolean Ice Arena
- Date: January 16 (qualification); January 19
- Competitors: 15 from 15 nations
- Winning points: 22

Medalists
1st place, gold medalist(s)		Julie Zwarthoed	Netherlands
2nd place, silver medalist(s)		Fanni Gasparics	Hungary
3rd place, bronze medalist(s)		Sharnita Crompton	Australia

The girls' individual skills challenge at the 2012 Winter Youth Olympics was held between January 16 and 19, 2012 at Tyrolean Ice Arena in Innsbruck, Austria. Individual skills challenge based on six skills, with total points to determine final placements.

== Qualification ==
The eight highest ranked will qualify (Q) to the Grand Final.

Rk	Name	Nation	Fastest Lap		Shooting Accuracy		Skating Agility		Fastest Shot		Passing Precision		Puck Control		Total Pts	Notes
Rk	Name	Nation	Pt	Rk	Pt	Rk	Pt	Rk	Pt	Rk	Pt	Rk	Pt	Rk	Total Pts	Notes
1	Julie Zwarthoed	Netherlands	7	2	3	6	7	2	8	1	7	2	3	6	35	Q
2	Katherine Gale	Great Britain	5	4	7	2	0	10	7	2	4	5	8	1	31	Q
3	Fanni Gasparics	Hungary	8	1	6	3	3	6	3	6	0	15	4	5	24	Q
4	Akane Deguchi	Japan	6	3	0	15	6	3	0	10	1	8	7	2	20	Q
5	Sharnita Crompton	Australia	1	8	0	12	8	1	1	8	5	4	2	7	17	Q
6	Morgane Rihet	France	3	6	2	7	5	4	0	12	2	7	5	4	17	Q
7	Agnese Tartaglione	Italy	0	11	1	8	1	8	5	4	8	1	0	15	15	Q
8	Libby-Jean Hay	New Zealand	4	5	8	1	0	15	0	9	3	6	0	9	15	Q
9	Victoria Hummel	Austria	0	14	0	13	2	7	6	3	0	12	6	3	14	
10	Renee De Wolf	Belgium	0	13	5	4	0	13	2	7	6	3	1	8	14	
11	Irene Senac	Spain	0	9	4	5	4	5	0	14	0	10	0	10	8	
12	Sun Jiayue	China	0	10	0	9	0	9	4	5	0	9	0	11	4	
13	Lee Yeon-jeong	South Korea	2	7	0	11	0	11	0	11	0	11	0	13	2	
14	Noémi Balló	Romania	0	12	0	10	0	12	0	13	0	14	0	12	0	
15	Urša Pazlar	Slovenia	0	15	0	14	0	14	0	15	0	13	0	14	0	

== Grand Final ==
The players are ranked by total points. If still tied, by number of better skill rankings (number of ranks 1; if the same, number of ranks 2; if the same, number of ranks 3, etc.). If still tied, by overall seeding for the phase.

Rk	Name	Nation	Overall seeding	Fastest Lap		Shooting Accuracy		Skating Agility		Fastest Shot		Passing Precision		Puck Control		Total Pts
Rk	Name	Nation	Overall seeding	Pt	Rk	Pt	Rk	Pt	Rk	Pt	Rk	Pt	Rk	Pt	Rk	Total Pts
1st place, gold medalist(s)	Julie Zwarthoed	Netherlands	8	3	3	4	2	3	4	5	1	2	7	5	1	22
2nd place, silver medalist(s)	Fanni Gasparics	Hungary	3	2	5	5	1	5	1	2	5	3	3	2	5	19
3rd place, bronze medalist(s)	Sharnita Crompton	Australia	7	2	8	2	7	3	3	3	4	5	1	2	7	17
4	Agnese Tartaglione	Italy	2	3	4	2	8	4	2	4	2	2	8	2	6	17
5	Katherine Gale	Great Britain	1	4	2	3	4	2	8	3	3	2	5	3	3	17
6	Morgane Rihet	France	10	5	1	2	6	2	5	2	8	2	6	3	4	16
7	Akane Deguchi	Japan	5	2	6	3	3	2	6	2	6	3	4	4	2	16
8	Libby-Jean Hay	New Zealand	4	2	7	2	5	2	7	2	7	4	2	0	8	12
