= Biathlon at the 2012 Winter Youth Olympics – Boys' pursuit =

Boys' pursuit at the I Winter Youth Olympic Games
- Venue: Seefeld Arena
- Date: 16 January
- Competitors: 50 from 30 nations

Medalists
1st place, gold medalist(s)		Niklas Homberg	Germany
2nd place, silver medalist(s)		Rene Zahkna	Estonia
3rd place, bronze medalist(s)		Cheng Fangming	China

The boys' pursuit competition of the biathlon events at the 2012 Winter Youth Olympics in Innsbruck, Austria, was held on January 16, at Seefeld Arena. 50 athletes from 30 countries took part. The race was 10 km in length.

== Results ==
The race was started at 14:30.

Rank	Bib	Name	Country	Start	Time	Penalties (P+P+S+S)	Deficit
1st place, gold medalist(s)	6	Niklas Homberg	Germany	0:44	28:43.1	4 (2+0+2+0)	–
2nd place, silver medalist(s)	2	Rene Zahkna	Estonia	0:21	28:52.6	4 (0+2+1+1)	+9.5
3rd place, bronze medalist(s)	1	Cheng Fangming	China	0:00	28:57.7	7 (2+1+1+3)	+14.6
4	14	Maximilian Janke	Germany	1:36	29:41.6	4 (0+0+2+2)	+58.5
5	14	Miha Dovžan	Slovenia	1:49	30:04.4	1 (1+0+0+0)	+1:21.3
6	5	Kristian André Aalerud	Norway	0:43	30:04.7	7 (2+1+1+3)	+1:21.6
7	4	Stuart Harden	Canada	0:30	30:05.7	1 (0+0+0+1)	+1:22.6
8	3	Aristide Bègue	France	0:27	30:22.2	7 (1+4+1+1)	+1:39.1
9	9	Håkon Livik	Norway	1:12	30:26.9	4 (0+2+1+1)	+1:43.8
10	7	Maksym Ivko	Ukraine	1:07	31:01.4	7 (0+2+3+2)	+2:18.3
11	16	Fabien Claude	France	1:44	31:06.2	6 (2+2+2+0)	+2:23.1
12	8	Adam Václavík	Czech Republic	1:11	31:07.2	8 (0+2+2+4)	+2:24.1
13	28	Thorsten Bischof	Austria	2:56	31:38.8	3 (1+0+1+1)	+2:55.7
14	12	Sean Doherty	United States	1:26	31:44.3	8 (1+1+5+1)	+3:01.2
15	10	Michael Pfeffer	Austria	1:14	31:52.9	9 (1+2+4+2)	+3:09.8
16	11	Xavier Guidetti	Italy	1:19	31:53.1	8 (0+2+2+4)	+3:10.0
17	26	Kenneth Schöpfer	Switzerland	2:53	32:01.5	3 (0+0+2+1)	+3:18.4
18	18	Jules Cuenot	Switzerland	1:57	32:15.3	8 (2+1+3+2)	+3:32.2
19	29	Niklas Forsberg	Sweden	2:58	32:18.3	7 (2+1+2+2)	+3:35.2
20	15	Federico Di Francesco	Italy	1:38	32:18.9	8 (5+2+1+0)	+3:35.8
21	19	Matej Burić	Croatia	2:07	32:55.8	6 (0+2+2+2)	+4:12.7
22	23	Ondřej Hošek	Czech Republic	2:34	33:09.6	7 (3+0+1+3)	+4:26.5
23	37	Marius Ungureanu	Romania	3:09	33:10.8	5 (0+2+2+1)	+4:27.7
24	24	Jakub Topór	Poland	2:47	33:15.6	7 (2+2+2+1)	+4:32.5
25	40	Ivan Galushkin	Russia	3:20	33:17.3	7 (3+2+1+1)	+4:34.2
26	34	Radi Palevski	Bulgaria	3:02	33:19.6	3 (0+1+0+2)	+4:36.5
27	22	Dmytro Ihnatyev	Ukraine	2:18	33:24.0	8 (4+2+1+1)	+4:40.9
28	27	Heikki Laitinen	Finland	2:53	33:30.0	4 (1+0+2+1)	+4:46.9
29	35	Calum Irvine	Great Britain	3:07	33:33.1	6 (1+3+0+2)	+4:50.0
30	36	Antti Repo	Finland	3:08	33:51.0	6 (3+0+2+1)	+5:07.9
31	31	Ruslan Bessov	Kazakhstan	2:58	34:12.2	9 (3+2+3+1)	+5:29.1
32	43	Aidan Millar	Canada	4:01	34:16.5	5 (1+2+2+0)	+5:33.4
33	30	Mateusz Janik	Poland	2:58	34:36.2	7 (1+1+3+2)	+5:53.1
34	20	Tarvi Sikk	Estonia	2:08	34:42.6	9 (1+1+5+2)	+5:59.5
35	21	Vid Zabret	Slovenia	2:18	34:51.8	9 (3+3+2+1)	+6:08.7
36	41	Ondrej Kosztolányi	Slovakia	3:27	34:52.2	6 (1+1+2+2)	+6:09.1
37	25	Aleksey Kuznetsov	Russia	2:52	35:22.6	10 (4+1+3+2)	+6:39.5
38	39	Raman Malukha	Belarus	3:17	35:30.4	4 (0+1+2+1)	+6:47.3
39	42	Denislav Shehtanov	Bulgaria	3:27	36:02.8	9 (2+2+2+3)	+7:19.7
40	31	Nick Proell	United States	3:00	36:03.6	8 (1+2+3+2)	+7:20.5
41	33	Mattias Jonsson	Sweden	3:02	36:32.2	8 (2+2+2+2)	+7:49.1
42	38	Choi Du-jin	South Korea	3:14	36:49.2	9 (2+3+3+1)	+8:06.1
43	49	Linards Zēmelis	Latvia	5:49	37:56.6	2 (0+1+0+1)	+9:13.5
44	44	Peter Oravec	Slovakia	4:26	38:22.1	9 (1+1+3+4)	+9:39.0
45	47	Dženis Avdić	Serbia	4:57	38:37.7	9 (0+2+3+4)	+9:54.6
46	48	Dávid Panyik	Hungary	5:04	39:35.7	10 (3+2+2+3)	+10:52.6
47	46	Arnoldas Mikelkevičius	Lithuania	4:40	39:42.0	10 (2+2+4+2)	+10:58.9
48	45	Jānis Slavēns	Latvia	4:29	41:33.3	10 (1+2+3+4)	+12:50.2
49	50	Lachlan Porter	Australia	6:59	44:31.3	9 (1+2+2+4)	+15:48.2
	13	Viktar Kryuko	Belarus	1:31	DSQ	3 (0+0+2+1)	
