= Montenegro at the 2012 Winter Youth Olympics =

- IOC code: MNE
- NOC: Montenegrin Olympic Committee
- Website: www.cokcg.org

in Innsbruck
- Competitors: 1 in 1 sport
- Flag bearer: Milena Radojičić
- Medals: Gold 0 Silver 0 Bronze 0 Total 0

Winter Youth Olympics appearances
- 2012; 2016; 2020; 2024

Montenegro competed at the 2012 Winter Youth Olympics in Innsbruck, Austria. The Montenegro team was made up of one athlete, an alpine skier.

== Alpine skiing ==
Montenegro qualified one girl in alpine skiing.

Girl

Athlete	Event	Final			
Athlete	Event	Run 1	Run 2	Total	Rank
Milena Radojičić	Slalom	49.46	45.00	1:34.46	19
Milena Radojičić	Giant slalom	1:12.80	1:10.99	2:23.79	41

== See also ==
- Montenegro at the 2012 Summer Olympics
