= India at the 2012 Winter Youth Olympics =

- IOC code: IND
- NOC: Indian Olympic Association

in Innsbruck
- Competitors: 1 in 1 sport
- Flag bearer: Aanchal Thakur
- Medals: Gold 0 Silver 0 Bronze 0 Total 0

Winter Youth Olympics appearances (overview)
- 2012; 2016; 2020; 2024

India competed at the 2012 Winter Youth Olympics in Innsbruck, Austria. The India team was made up of one female athlete competing in alpine skiing.

== Alpine skiing ==
India qualified one girl in alpine skiing.

Girl

Athlete	Event	Final			
Athlete	Event	Run 1	Run 2	Total	Rank
Aanchal Thakur	Slalom	1:06.70	1:02.76	2:09.46	27
Aanchal Thakur	Giant slalom	1:23.83	1:24.88	2:48.71	43

== See also ==
- India at the 2012 Summer Olympics
