= Georgia at the 2012 Winter Youth Olympics =

- Flag of Georgia
- IOC code: GEO
- NOC: Georgian National Olympic Committee
- Website: www.geonoc.org.ge

in Innsbruck
- Competitors: 2 in 1 sport
- Flag bearer: Susana Gavva
- Medals: Gold 0 Silver 0 Bronze 0 Total 0

Winter Youth Olympics appearances
- 2012; 2016; 2020; 2024

Georgia competed at the 2012 Winter Youth Olympics in Innsbruck, Austria. The Georgian team consisted of two athletes in one sport, alpine skiing.

== Alpine skiing ==
Georgia qualified one boy and girl in alpine skiing.

Boy

Athlete	Event	Final			
Athlete	Event	Run 1	Run 2	Total	Rank
Nikoloz Kozanashvili	Slalom	43.25	DNF		
Nikoloz Kozanashvili	Giant slalom	1:01.77	57.98	1:59.75	20

Girl

Athlete	Event	Final			
Athlete	Event	Run 1	Run 2	Total	Rank
Susana Gavva	Slalom	49.94	46.46	1:36.40	22
Susana Gavva	Giant slalom	1:07.73	1:07.28	2:15.01	32

== See also ==
- Georgia at the 2012 Summer Olympics
