= Lebanon at the 2012 Winter Youth Olympics =

- IOC code: LIB
- NOC: Lebanese Olympic Committee
- Website: www.lebolymp.org

in Innsbruck
- Competitors: 2 in 1 sport
- Flag bearer: Alexandre Mohbat
- Medals: Gold 0 Silver 0 Bronze 0 Total 0

Winter Youth Olympics appearances
- 2012; 2016; 2020; 2024

Lebanon competed at the 2012 Winter Youth Olympics in Innsbruck, Austria. The Lebanese team consisted of just two athletes in one sport, alpine skiing.

== Alpine skiing ==
Lebanon qualified one boy and one girl in alpine skiing.

Boy

| Athlete | Event | Final | | | |
| Athlete | Event | Run 1 | Run 2 | Total | Rank |
|---|---|---|---|---|---|
| Alexandre Mohbat | Slalom | 48.53 | 45.88 | 1:34.41 | 28 |
| Alexandre Mohbat | Giant slalom | 1:04.26 | 1:00.21 | 2:04.47 | 30 |
| Alexandre Mohbat | Super-G | | | 1:14.42 | 36 |
| Alexandre Mohbat | Combined | 1:10.52 | 47.46 | 1:57.98 | 29 |

Girl

| Athlete | Event | Final | | | |
| Athlete | Event | Run 1 | Run 2 | Total | Rank |
|---|---|---|---|---|---|
| Celine Kairouz | Slalom | DNF | | | |
| Celine Kairouz | Giant slalom | 1:11.26 | 1:11.30 | 2:22.56 | 39 |
| Celine Kairouz | Super-G | | | 1:25.79 | 31 |
| Celine Kairouz | Combined | 1:21.08 | 48.66 | 2:09.74 | 29 |

== See also ==
- Lebanon at the 2012 Summer Olympics
