= Turkey at the 2012 Winter Youth Olympics =

- IOC code: TUR
- NOC: Turkish Olympic Committee
- Website: www.olimpiyatkomitesi.org.tr

in Innsbruck
- Competitors: 4 in 3 sports
- Flag bearer: Dila Kavur
- Medals: Gold 0 Silver 0 Bronze 0 Total 0

Winter Youth Olympics appearances (overview)
- 2012; 2016; 2020; 2024

Turkey competed at the 2012 Winter Youth Olympics in Innsbruck, Austria from January 13 to January 22, 2012.

== Competitors ==
Sport	Men	Women	Total
Alpine skiing	1	1	2
Cross-country skiing	1	0	1
Ski jumping	1	0	1
Total	3	1	4

== Alpine skiing ==
Turkey qualified 2 athletes.

Boys

Athlete	Event	Final			
Athlete	Event	Run 1	Run 2	Total	Rank
Mustafa Topaloglu	Slalom	48.34	48.87	1:37.21	29
Mustafa Topaloglu	Giant slalom	DSQ			
Mustafa Topaloglu	Super-G			1:15.64	37
Mustafa Topaloglu	Combined	1:14.99	47.66	2:02.65	32

Girls

Athlete	Event	Final			
Athlete	Event	Run 1	Run 2	Total	Rank
Dila Kavur	Slalom	53.74	49.08	1:42.82	26
Dila Kavur	Giant slalom	1:10.13	1:10.75	2:20.88	38
Dila Kavur	Super-G			1:20.46	30
Dila Kavur	Combined	1:19.80	47.62	2:07.42	27

== Cross-country skiing ==
Turkey qualified 1 athlete.

Boys

Athlete	Event	Final	
Athlete	Event	Time	Rank
Hamza Dursun	10km classical	32:55.5	28

Sprint

Athlete	Event	Qualification		Quarterfinal		Semifinal		Final	
Athlete	Event	Total	Rank	Total	Rank	Total	Rank	Total	Rank
Hamza Dursun	Boys' sprint	1:49.46	25 Q	2:30.2	6	did not advance			

== Ski jumping ==
Turkey qualified 1 athlete.

Boys

Athlete	Event	1st Jump		2nd Jump		Overall	
Athlete	Event	Distance	Points	Distance	Points	Points	Rank
Falik Yuksel	Boys' individual	64.5m	100.6	62.5m	95.3	195.9	16

== See also ==
- Turkey at the 2012 Summer Olympics
