= Iceland at the 2012 Winter Youth Olympics =

- IOC code: ISL
- NOC: Icelandic Olympic Committee
- Website: www.olympic.is

in Innsbruck
- Competitors: 3 in 2 sports
- Flag bearer: Jakob Bjarnason
- Medals: Gold 0 Silver 0 Bronze 0 Total 0

Winter Youth Olympics appearances
- 2012; 2016; 2020; 2024

Iceland competed at the 2012 Winter Youth Olympics in Innsbruck, Austria. The Icelandic team was made up of three athletes in two sports.

== Alpine skiing ==
Iceland qualified one boy and one girl in alpine skiing.

Boy

Athlete	Event	Final			
Athlete	Event	Run 1	Run 2	Total	Rank
Jakob Bjarnason	Slalom	DSQ			
Jakob Bjarnason	Giant slalom	DNF			
Jakob Bjarnason	Super-G			1:07.07	19
Jakob Bjarnason	Combined	1:05.34	DNF		

Girl

Athlete	Event	Final			
Athlete	Event	Run 1	Run 2	Total	Rank
Helga Vilhjalmsdóttir	Slalom	45.63	39.29	1:24.92	8
Helga Vilhjalmsdóttir	Giant slalom	1:00.31	1:01.75	2:02.06	21
Helga Vilhjalmsdóttir	Super-G			DNF	
Helga Vilhjalmsdóttir	Combined	1:08.44	37.00	1:45.44	15

== Cross country skiing ==
Iceland qualified one boy in Cross-country skiing.

Boy

Athlete	Event	Final	
Athlete	Event	Time	Rank
Gunnar Birgisson	10km classical	35:06.8	38

Sprint

Athlete	Event	Qualification		Quarterfinal		Semifinal		Final	
Athlete	Event	Total	Rank	Total	Rank	Total	Rank	Total	Rank
Gunnar Birgisson	Boys' sprint	1:57.66	41	did not advance					

== See also ==
- Iceland at the 2012 Summer Olympics
