= Ice hockey at the 2012 Winter Youth Olympics =

Ice hockey at the I Winter Youth Olympic Games
- Venue: Tyrolean Ice Arena; Innsbruck
- Dates: 13–22 January
- Competitors: 200 from 26 nations

Ice hockey at the 2012 Winter Youth Olympics was held at the Tyrolean Ice Arena in Innsbruck, Austria from 13 to 22 January. The difference between the Youth Olympic program for ice hockey and the Winter Olympics was the addition of a skill challenge for each gender.

== Medal summary ==
=== Medal table ===
* Host nation (Austria)

Rank	Nation	Gold	Silver	Bronze	Total
1	Finland	1	0	0	1
1	Latvia	1	0	0	1
1	Netherlands	1	0	0	1
1	Sweden	1	0	0	1
5	Hungary	0	2	0	2
6	Austria*	0	1	0	1
6	Russia	0	1	0	1
8	Australia	0	0	1	1
8	Canada	0	0	1	1
8	Germany	0	0	1	1
8	Japan	0	0	1	1
Totals (11 entries)		4	4	4	12

=== Events ===
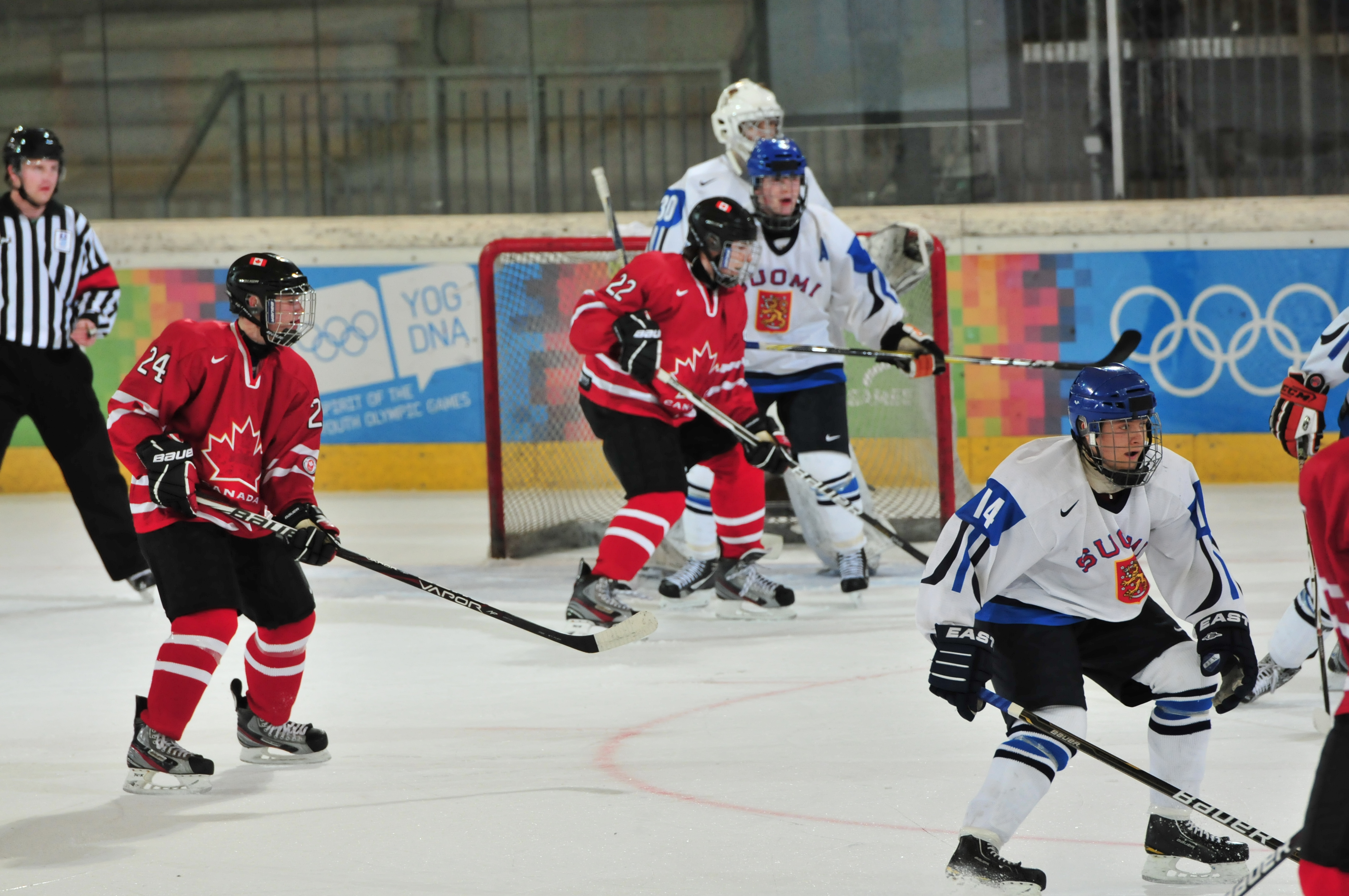
Boys' semifinal game Canada vs. Finland

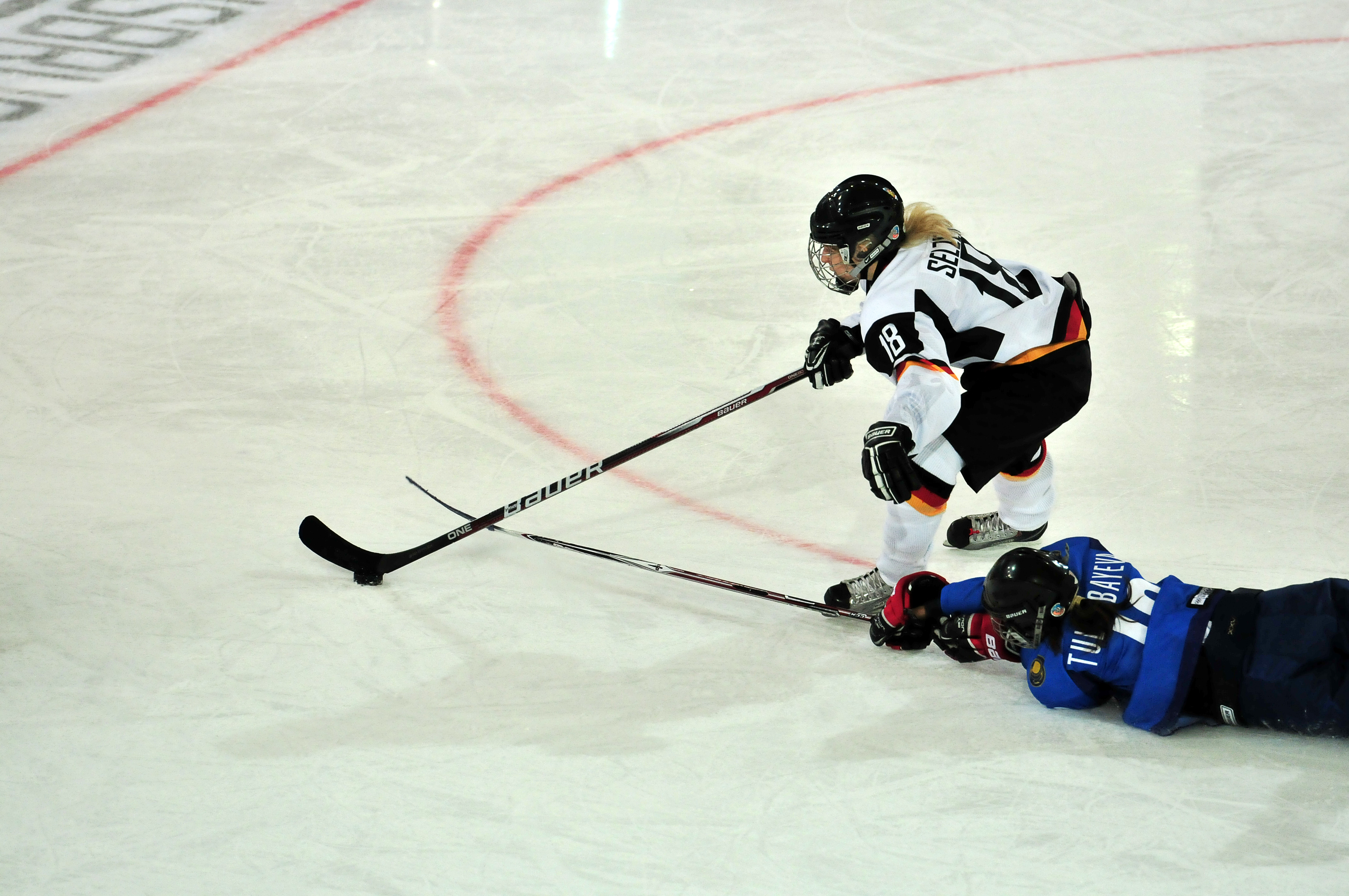
Girls' playoff game Germany vs. Kazakhstan

Event	Gold		Silver		Bronze	
Boys'	Finland		Russia		Canada	
Boys' individual skills challenge	Augusts Valdis Vasiļonoks; Latvia	22 points	Attila Kovács; Hungary	21 points	Seiya Furukawa; Japan	19 points
Girls'	Sweden		Austria		Germany	
Girls' individual skills challenge	Julie Zwarthoed; Netherlands	22 points	Fanni Gasparics; Hungary	19 points	Sharnita Crompton; Australia	17 points

== Qualification system ==
There were ten teams total (five per gender), with 17 players on each team. The host nation was allowed one team of each gender. The remaining eight teams were selected based on their joint Men's and Women's 2011 IIHF World Ranking.

For the skills challenge, the host nation was allowed one competitor of each sex. For the remaining competitors, national competitions were held, and the qualifiers attended a Global Skills Challenge at the 2011 Hockey Development Camp in Vierumäki, Finland.

For the boys tournament, athletes born in 1996 are permitted to compete, for the girls its 1994.

The IIHF announced the teams on September 23.

=== Boys ===
- Austria
- Canada
- Finland
- Russia
- United States

=== Girls ===
- Austria
- Germany
- Kazakhstan
- Slovakia
- Sweden

=== Skills challenge ===
The following athletes have qualified: Originally 16 athletes from each gender were to compete, but the girls' competition will have only 15 while the boys' competition will have 16.

Event	Boys'	Girls'
Host nation	Stephan Gaffal (AUT)	Victoria Hummel (AUT)
Skills challenge qualifier	Lewis Hook (GBR); Attila Kovács (HUN); Callum Burns (NZL); Seiya Furukawa (JPN); Sam Hodic (AUS); Guus Simons (NED); Liu Qing (CHN); Thibaut Colombin (FRA); Cho Ji-hyun (KOR); Paul Cerda (ESP); Mihai Sotir (ROU); Primož Čuvan (SLO); Augusts Vasiļonoks (LAT); Alexei Dashkevich (BLR); Matija Miličić (CRO)	Kathrine Gale (GBR); Agnese Tartaglione (ITA); Fanni Gasparics (HUN); Libby-Jean Hay (NZL); Akane Deguchi (JPN); Sharnita Crompton (AUS); Julie Zwarthoed (NED); Sun Jiayue (CHN); Morgane Rihet (FRA); Lee Yeon-jeong (KOR); Irene Senac (ESP); Noemi Ballo (ROU); Renee De Wolf (BEL); Urša Pazlar (SLO)
Total	16	15
