= Philippines at the 2012 Winter Youth Olympics =

- Flag of the Philippines
- IOC code: PHI
- NOC: Philippine Olympic Committee
- Website: www.olympic.ph

in Innsbruck
- Competitors: 2 in 2 sports
- Flag bearer: Abel Tesfamariam
- Medals: Gold 0 Silver 0 Bronze 0 Total 0

Winter Youth Olympics appearances (overview)
- 2012; 2016; 2020; 2024

The Philippines competed at the 2012 Winter Youth Olympics in Innsbruck, Austria. The Philippine team consisted of two athletes in two sports.

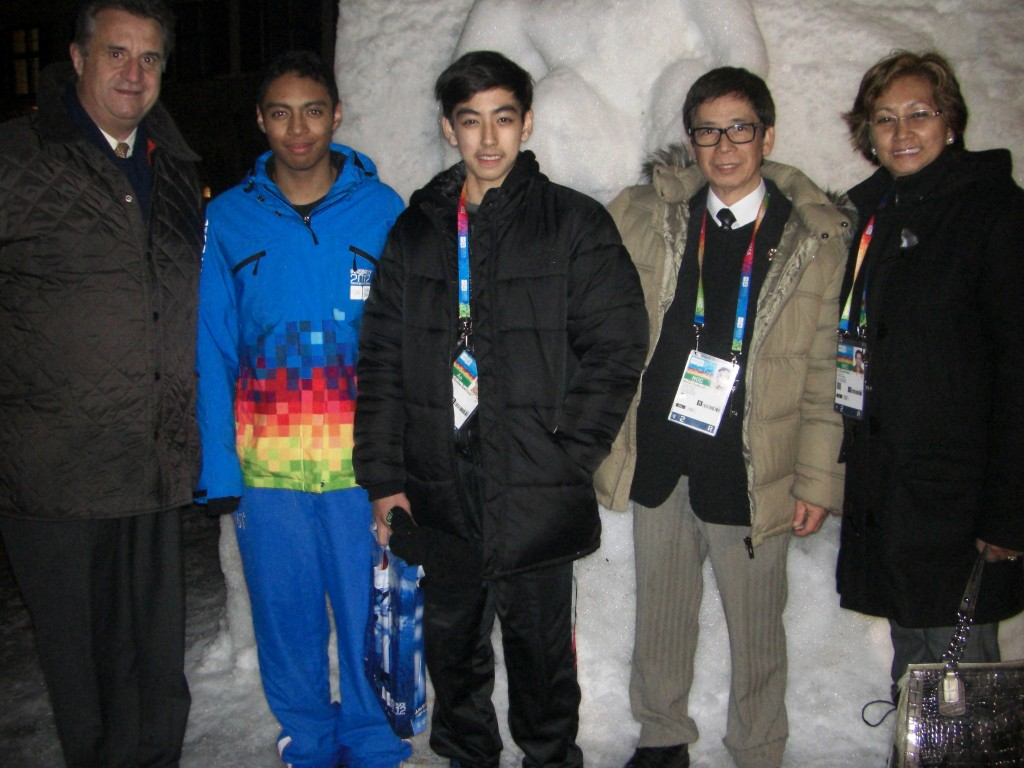
Philippine delegation with Consul Christian Traweger (left). The two athletes which formed the delegation are Abel Tesfamariam (second from left) and Michael Christian Martinez (middle).

== Alpine skiing ==
The Philippines has qualified one male athlete to compete in the alpine skiing event. Abel Tesfamariam is a Filipino-Eritrean based in Switzerland. Prior to the games, Tesfamariam got involved in an accident during a practice session.

Boy

Athlete	Event	Final			
Athlete	Event	Run 1	Run 2	Total	Rank
Abel Tesfamariam	Slalom	52.02	DNF		
Abel Tesfamariam	Giant slalom	1:10.20	1:04.13	2:14.33	37

== Figure skating ==
Philippines has qualified 1 athlete. Michael Christian Martinez, who would later qualify for future editions of the senior Winter Olympic Games, represented the country.

Boy

Athlete(s)	Event	SP/OD		FS/FD		Total	
Athlete(s)	Event	Points	Rank	Points	Rank	Points	Rank
Michael Christian Martinez	Singles	54.35	3	97.25	7	151.60	7

== See also ==
- Philippines at the 2012 Summer Olympics
