= Greece at the 2012 Winter Youth Olympics =

- IOC code: GRE
- NOC: Hellenic Olympic Committee
- Website: www.hoc.gr

in Innsbruck
- Competitors: 3 in 2 sports
- Flag bearer: Anastasia Gkogkou
- Medals: Gold 0 Silver 0 Bronze 0 Total 0

Winter Youth Olympics appearances
- 2012; 2016; 2020; 2024

Greece competed at the 2012 Winter Youth Olympics in Innsbruck, Austria. The Greek team consisted of three athletes in two sports.

== Alpine skiing ==
Greece qualified one boy and girl in alpine skiing.

Boy

Athlete	Event	Final			
Athlete	Event	Run 1	Run 2	Total	Rank
Massimiliano Valcareggi	Slalom	42.65	42.19	1:24.84	18
Massimiliano Valcareggi	Giant slalom	1:14.65	DNF		
Massimiliano Valcareggi	Super-G			1:05.55	8
Massimiliano Valcareggi	Combined	1:05.42	DNF		

Girl

Athlete	Event	Final			
Athlete	Event	Run 1	Run 2	Total	Rank
Anastasia Gkogkou	Slalom	50.00	46.15	1:36.15	21
Anastasia Gkogkou	Giant slalom	1:08.07	1:09.06	2:17.13	35
Anastasia Gkogkou	Super-G			DNS	

== Cross country skiing ==
Greece qualified one boy.

Boy

Athlete	Event	Final	
Athlete	Event	Time	Rank
Dimitrios Kyriazis	10km classical	40:40.8	48

Sprint

Athlete	Event	Qualification		Quarterfinal		Semifinal		Final	
Athlete	Event	Total	Rank	Total	Rank	Total	Rank	Total	Rank
Dimitrios Kyriazis	Boys' sprint	2:00.22	42	did not advance					

== See also ==
- Greece at the 2012 Summer Olympics
