= Peru at the 2012 Winter Youth Olympics =

- IOC code: PER
- NOC: Comité Olímpico Peruano
- Website: www.coperu.org (in Spanish)

in Innsbruck
- Competitors: 1 in 1 sport
- Flag bearer: Isabella Todd
- Medals: Gold 0 Silver 0 Bronze 0 Total 0

Winter Youth Olympics appearances
- 2012; 2016–2024

Peru competed at the 2012 Winter Youth Olympics in Innsbruck, Austria. The Peruvian team was made up of one female athlete competing in alpine skiing.

== Alpine skiing ==
Peru has qualified one girl in alpine skiing.

Isabella Todd is an American who was discovered by Peru's first athlete to qualify for an Olympic Winter Games, Roberto Carcelén. Todd qualifies as a Peruvian through her mother who was born in Peru.

Girl

Athlete	Event	Run 1	Run 2	Total	Rank
Isabella Todd	Girls' slalom	1:43.15	1:38.85	3:22.00	28
Isabella Todd	Girls' giant slalom	DNS			

== See also ==
- Peru at the 2012 Summer Olympics
