= Tim-Kevin Ravnjak =

Slovenian snowboarder (born 1996)

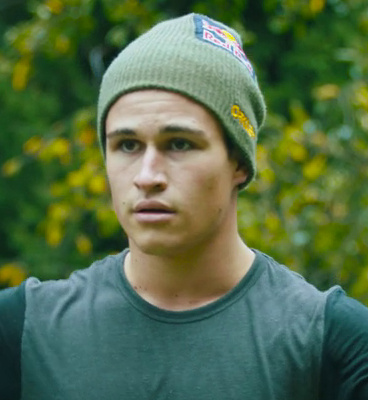

Medal record

Men's Snowboarding

Representing Slovenia

World Championships
Bronze medal – third place	2015 Kreischberg	Halfpipe

Junior World Championship
Gold medal – first place	2012 Sierra Nevada	Halfpipe
Gold medal – first place	2014 Chiesa in Valmalenco	Halfpipe
Silver medal – second place	2011 Valmalenco	Slopestyle
Silver medal – second place	2013 Erzurum	Halfpipe

Youth Olympics
Silver medal – second place	2012 Innsbruck	Halfpipe

Tim-Kevin Ravnjak (born 5 November 1996) is a Slovenian snowboarder. He is a two-time Olympian representing Slovenia at the 2018 Winter Olympics in Pyongchang and the 2014 Winter Olympics in Sochi. In the 2014 Games, he competed in halfpipe and finished 8th.
