= Ski jumping at the 2012 Winter Youth Olympics =

Ski jumping at the I Winter Youth Olympic Games
- Venue: Toni-Seelos-Olympiaschanze; Igls, Seefeld
- Dates: 14 January
- Competitors: 37 from 24 nations

Ski jumping at the 2012 Winter Youth Olympics was held at the Toni-Seelos-Olympiaschanze in Seefeld, Austria on 14 January. For the first time ever women competed in ski jumping at an Olympic event

== Events ==
The ski jumping event included the boys' individual event and, for the first time at the Olympics, the girls' individual event. There was also a mixed team event, with a team consisted of a girl, a boy, and a Nordic combined athlete.

== Medal summary ==
=== Medal table ===
Rank	Nation	Gold	Silver	Bronze	Total
1	Slovenia	1	1	1	3
2	Germany	1	1	0	2
3	Japan	1	0	1	2
4	Norway	0	1	0	1
5	Canada	0	0	1	1
Totals (5 entries)		3	3	3	9

=== Events ===
Event	Gold		Silver		Bronze	
Boys' individual	Anže Lanišek; Slovenia	286.1	Mats Søhagen Berggaard; Norway	277.8	Yukiya Sato; Japan	260.1
Girls' individual	Sara Takanashi; Japan	269.3	Katharina Althaus; Germany	242.5	Urša Bogataj; Slovenia	239.3
Team competition	Germany; Katharina Althaus; Tom Lubitz; Andreas Wellinger	640.1	Slovenia; Urša Bogataj; Luka Pintarič; Anže Lanišek	610.5	Canada; Taylor Henrich; Nathaniel Mah; Dusty Korek	587.0

== Qualification ==
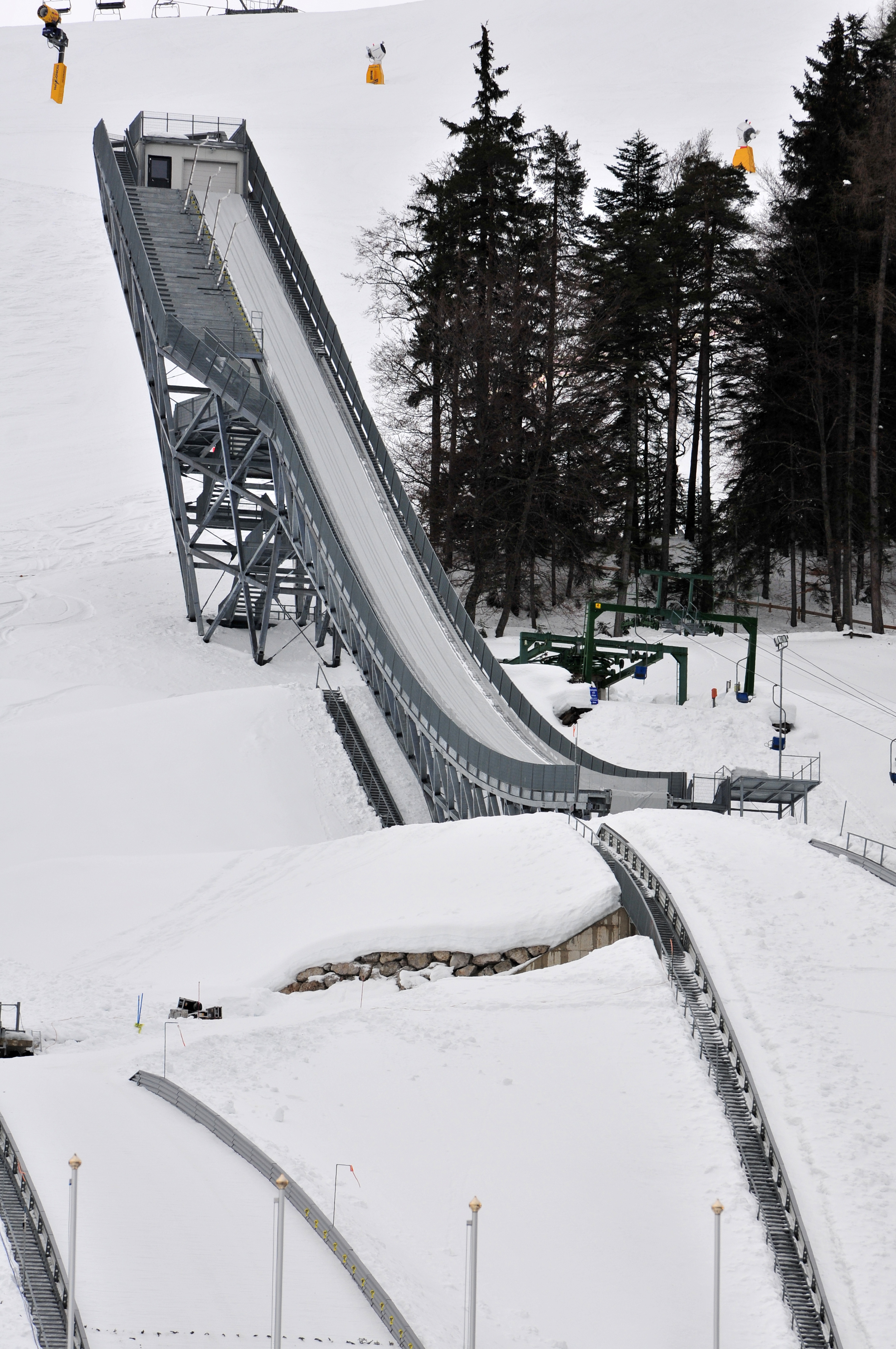
Toni-Seelos-Olympiaschanze at the 2012 Winter Youth Olympics

Nations scoring points in the Marc Hodler Trophy were guaranteed one athlete as was the host nation (8 countries). The remaining spots were distributed according to the normal hill results from the World Junior Championships. There were 25 spots reserved for the boys' competition but due to reallocation it was only 24. The updated quota spots were announced on December 13, 2011, which are subject to change.

=== Qualification summary ===
NOC	Boys'	Girls'	Total
NOC	Individual	Individual	Total
Austria	1	1	2
Belarus	1		1
Bulgaria	1		1
Canada	1	1	2
China		1	1
Czech Republic	1	1	2
Estonia	1		1
Finland	1	1	2
France	1	1	2
Germany	1	1	2
Hungary	1		1
Italy	1	1	2
Japan	1	1	2
Kazakhstan	1		1
Netherlands	1		1
Norway	1	1	2
Poland	1	1	2
Romania	1		1
Russia	1	1	2
Slovenia	1	1	2
Switzerland	1		1
Turkey	1		1
Ukraine	1		1
United States	1	1	2
Total: 24 NOCs	23	14	37
