= Lithuania at the 2012 Winter Youth Olympics =

- IOC code: LTU
- NOC: Lithuanian National Olympic Committee
- Website: www.ltok.lt (in Lithuanian and English)

in Innsbruck
- Competitors: 6 in 3 sports
- Flag bearer: Rokas Zaveckas
- Medals: Gold 0 Silver 0 Bronze 0 Total 0

Winter Youth Olympics appearances (overview)
- 2012; 2016; 2020; 2024

Lithuania competed at the 2012 Winter Youth Olympics in Innsbruck, Austria. Lithuania was represented by 6 athletes in three sports.

Agnė Sereikaitė won a quota place in short track speed skating but did not compete at the games.

== Alpine skiing ==
Lithuania has qualified two skiers in alpine skiing.

Boys

Athlete	Event	Final			
Athlete	Event	Run 1	Run 2	Total	Rank
Rokas Zaveckas	Slalom	46.05	43.24	1:29.29	24
Rokas Zaveckas	Giant slalom	1:03.30	59.96	2:03.26	29
Rokas Zaveckas	Super-G			1:12.29	35
Rokas Zaveckas	Combined	1:10.40	42.08	1:52.48	28

Girls

Athlete	Event	Final			
Athlete	Event	Run 1	Run 2	Total	Rank
Laura Pamerneckytė	Slalom	DNF	DNS	DNF	DNF
Laura Pamerneckytė	Giant slalom	1:08.12	1:09.30	2:17.42	36

== Biathlon ==
Lithuania has qualified two skiers in biathlon.

Boys

Athlete	Event	Final		
Athlete	Event	Time	Misses	Rank
Arnoldas Mikelkevičius	Sprint	24:02.1	5	46
Arnoldas Mikelkevičius	Pursuit	39:42.0	10	47

Girls

Athlete	Event	Final		
Athlete	Event	Time	Misses	Rank
Gaudvilė Nalivaikaitė	Sprint	22:40.7	5	44
Gaudvilė Nalivaikaitė	Pursuit	38:05.4	5	43

Mixed

Athlete	Event	Final		
Athlete	Event	Time	Misses	Rank
Gaudvile Nalivaikaite; Kristina Kazlauskaitė; Arnoldas Mikelkevicius; Jaunius Drusys	Cross-Country-Biathlon Mixed Relay	1:14:57.8	3+9	22

== Cross-country skiing ==
Lithuania has qualified two skiers in cross country skiing.

Boys

Athlete	Event	Final	
Athlete	Event	Time	Rank
Jaunius Drusys	10km classical	33:46.3	33

Girls

Athlete	Event	Final	
Athlete	Event	Time	Rank
Kristina Kazlauskaitė	5km classical	17:29.1	29

Sprint

Athlete	Event	Qualification		Quarterfinal		Semifinal		Final	
Athlete	Event	Total	Rank	Total	Rank	Total	Rank	Total	Rank
Jaunius Drusys	Boys' sprint	1:54.24	36	did not advance					
Kristina Kazlauskaitė	Girls' sprint	2:08.43	26 Q	2:09.1	4	did not advance			

Mixed

Athlete	Event	Final		
Athlete	Event	Time	Misses	Rank
Gaudvile Nalivaikaite; Kristina Kazlauskaitė; Arnoldas Mikelkevicius; Jaunius Drusys	Cross-Country-Biathlon Mixed Relay	1:14:57.8	3+9	22

== See also ==
- Lithuania at the 2012 Summer Olympics
