= Luxembourg at the 2012 Winter Youth Olympics =

- IOC code: LUX
- NOC: Luxembourgian Olympic and Sporting Committee

in Innsbruck
- Competitors: 1 in 1 sport
- Flag bearer: Catherine Elvinger
- Medals: Gold 0 Silver 0 Bronze 0 Total 0

Winter Youth Olympics appearances
- 2012; 2016; 2020; 2024

Luxembourg competed at the 2012 Winter Youth Olympics in Innsbruck, Austria. The Luxembourgish team was made up of one athlete and three officials. Ferand Guth was the Chef De Mission of the team.

== Alpine skiing ==
Luxembourg qualified one girl in alpine skiing.

Girl

Athlete	Event	Final			
Athlete	Event	Run 1	Run 2	Total	Rank
Catherine Elvinger	Slalom	48.25	44.73	1:32.98	18
Catherine Elvinger	Giant slalom	1:03.44	1:04.16	2:07.60	29

== See also ==
- Luxembourg at the 2012 Summer Olympics
