= Australia at the 2012 Winter Youth Olympics =

- IOC code: AUS
- NOC: Australian Olympic Committee
- Website: www.olympics.com.au

in Innsbruck
- Competitors: 13 in 8 sports
- Flag bearer: Greta Small
- Medals Ranked 28th: Gold 0 Silver 0 Bronze 2 Total 2

Winter Youth Olympics appearances
- 2012; 2016; 2020; 2024

Australia competed at the 2012 Winter Youth Olympics in Innsbruck. The chef de mission of the team was former Olympic champion Alisa Camplin, the first time a woman is the chef de mission of any Australian Olympic team. The Australian team consisted of 13 athletes in 8 sports.

== Medalists ==
Medal	Name	Sport	Event	Date
Bronze	Sharnita Crompton	Ice Hockey	Girls' individual skills challenge	19 Jan
Bronze	Alexandra Fitch	Snowboarding	Girls' Slopestyle	19 Jan

== Alpine skiing ==
Australia has qualified one boy and one girl.

=== Boys ===
Athlete	Event	Final			
Athlete	Event	Run 1	Run 2	Total	Rank
Harry Laidlaw	Slalom	43.26	41.30	1:24.56	17
Harry Laidlaw	Giant slalom	DNF	-	-	-
Harry Laidlaw	Super-G			DSQ	-
Harry Laidlaw	Combined	1:06.69	DNF	-	-

=== Girls ===
Athlete	Event	Final			
Athlete	Event	Run 1	Run 2	Total	Rank
Greta Small	Slalom	43.83	40.41	1:24.24	7
Greta Small	Giant slalom	59.56	1:00.34	1:59.90	13
Greta Small	Super-G			1:06.52	7
Greta Small	Combined	1:06.13	38.07	1:44.20	13

== Biathlon ==
Australia has qualified one boy.

=== Boys ===
Athlete	Event	Final		
Athlete	Event	Time	Misses	Rank
Lachlan Porter	Sprint	26:21.1	4	50
Lachlan Porter	Pursuit	44:31.3	9	49

== Cross country skiing ==
Australia has qualified one boy and one girl.

=== Boys ===
Athlete	Event	Final	
Athlete	Event	Time	Rank
Alex Gibson	10 km classical	38:20.4	44

=== Girls ===
Athlete	Event	Final	
Athlete	Event	Time	Rank
Lucy Glanville	5 km classical	18:23.0	34

=== Sprint ===
Athlete	Event	Qualification		Quarterfinal		Semifinal		Final	
Athlete	Event	Total	Rank	Total	Rank	Total	Rank	Total	Rank
Alex Gibson	Boys' sprint	1:56.49	40	did not advance					
Lucy Glanville	Girls' sprint	2:12.46	31	did not advance					

== Figure skating ==
Australia has qualified one girl.

Athlete(s)	Event	SP		FS		Total	
Athlete(s)	Event	Points	Rank	Points	Rank	Points	Rank
Chantelle Kerry	Girls' singles	37.51	11	71.48	9	108.99	10

== Freestyle skiing ==
Australia has qualified one boy and one girl for the ski cross events. Australia has qualified an athlete in the boys' halfpipe event.

Halfpipe

Athlete	Event	Qualifying			Final		
Athlete	Event	Run 1	Run 2	Rank	Run 1	Run 2	Rank
Thomas Waddell	Boys' halfpipe	14.50	47.75	12 Q	48.25	14.25	11

Ski cross

Athlete	Event	Qualifying		Quarterfinals	Semifinals	Finals	
Athlete	Event	Time	Rank	Position	Position	Position	Rank
Harry Laidlaw	Boys' ski cross	57.43	4	Cancelled			4
Jack Millar	Boys' ski cross	59.46	13	Cancelled			13
Claudia Leggett	Girls' ski cross	1:00.30	5	Cancelled			5

== Ice hockey ==
Australia has qualified a boy and girl athlete for the skills challenge competition.

Athlete(s)	Event	Qualification		Grand final	
Athlete(s)	Event	Points	Rank	Points	Rank
Sam Hodic	Boys' individual skills	5	15	did not advance	
Sharnita Crompton	Girls' individual skills	17	5 Q	17	3rd place, bronze medalist(s)

== Luge ==
Australia has qualified one boy.

=== Singles ===
Athlete	Event	Final			
Athlete	Event	Run 1	Run 2	Total	Rank
Alex Ferlazzo	Boys' singles	40.849	40.526	1:21.375	19

== Snowboarding ==
Australia has qualified one girl.

Athlete	Event	Qualifying			Semifinal			Final		
Athlete	Event	Run 1	Run 2	Rank	Run 1	Run 2	Rank	Run 1	Run 2	Rank
Alexandra Fitch	Girls' halfpipe	61.25	67.00	4 q	82.00	87.50	1 Q	75.25	60.75	4
Alexandra Fitch	Girls' slopestyle	59.25	77.75	3 Q				69.75	42.50	3rd place, bronze medalist(s)

== See also ==
- Australia at the 2012 Summer Olympics
