= Denmark at the 2012 Winter Youth Olympics =

- IOC code: DEN
- NOC: Denmark Olympic Committee
- Website: www.dif.dk

in Innsbruck
- Competitors: 5 in 3 sports
- Flag bearer: Philip Due Schmidt
- Medals: Gold 0 Silver 0 Bronze 0 Total 0

Winter Youth Olympics appearances
- 2012; 2016; 2020; 2024

Denmark competed at the 2012 Winter Youth Olympics in Innsbruck, Austria. The Danish team was made up of 5 athletes, competing in 3 different sports.

== Alpine skiing ==
Denmark qualified one boy and girl in alpine skiing.

Boy

Athlete	Event	Final			
Athlete	Event	Run 1	Run 2	Total	Rank
Frederik Bigom	Slalom	47.45	DNF		
Frederik Bigom	Giant slalom	1:03.07	58.87	2:01.94	27
Frederik Bigom	Super-G			DNF	
Frederik Bigom	Combined	1:08.69	43.59	1:52.28	27

Girl

Athlete	Event	Final			
Athlete	Event	Run 1	Run 2	Total	Rank
Julie Faarup	Slalom	53.20	49.14	1:42.34	25
Julie Faarup	Giant slalom	1:09.41	1:09.56	2:18.97	37
Julie Faarup	Super-G			DNF	
Julie Faarup	Combined	1:13.34	48.09	2:01.43	26

== Cross country skiing ==
Denmark qualified a team of one boy and one girl.

Boy

Athlete	Event	Final	
Athlete	Event	Time	Rank
Eirik Stonor	10km classical	DNS	

Girl

Athlete	Event	Final	
Athlete	Event	Time	Rank
Caroline Carlsen	5km classical	20:04.8	37

Sprint

Athlete	Event	Qualification		Quarterfinal		Semifinal		Final	
Athlete	Event	Total	Rank	Total	Rank	Total	Rank	Total	Rank
Eirik Stonor	Boys' sprint	2:01.59	44	did not advance					
Caroline Carlsen	Girls' sprint	2:28.11	39	did not advance					

== Speed skating ==
Denmark qualified one male athlete.

Boy

Athlete	Event	Race 1	Race 2	Total	Rank
Philip Due Schmidt	Boys' 3000 m			4:39.71	14
Philip Due Schmidt	Boys' Mass Start			7:28.75	17

== See also ==
- Denmark at the 2012 Summer Olympics
