= Brazil at the 2012 Winter Youth Olympics =

- IOC code: BRA
- NOC: Brazilian Olympic Committee
- Website: www.cob.org.br (in Portuguese)

in Innsbruck
- Competitors: 2 in 1 sport
- Flag bearer: Eliza Nobre
- Medals: Gold 0 Silver 0 Bronze 0 Total 0

Winter Youth Olympics appearances (overview)
- 2012; 2016; 2020; 2024

Brazil competed at the 2012 Winter Youth Olympics in Innsbruck, Austria. The Brazilian team was made up of two athlete, both in alpine skiing.

Brazil had originally qualified a mixed curling team, however the quota spots were rejected.

== Alpine skiing ==
Brazil qualified one boy and one girl in alpine skiing.

Boy

Athlete	Event	Final			
Athlete	Event	Run 1	Run 2	Total	Rank
Tobias Macedo	Slalom	56.45	49.14	1:45.59	33
Tobias Macedo	Giant slalom	1:06.51	1:01.06	2:07.57	32

Girl

Athlete	Event	Final			
Athlete	Event	Run 1	Run 2	Total	Rank
Eliza Nobre	Slalom	59.91	DSQ		
Eliza Nobre	Giant slalom	1:10.76	1:13.54	2:24.30	42

== See also ==
- Brazil at the 2012 Summer Olympics
