= Bulgaria at the 2012 Winter Youth Olympics =

- IOC code: BUL
- NOC: Bulgarian Olympic Committee
- Website: www.bgolympic.org

in Innsbruck
- Competitors: 11 in 6 sports
- Flag bearer: Aleksandra Popova
- Medals: Gold 0 Silver 0 Bronze 0 Total 0

Winter Youth Olympics appearances (overview)
- 2012; 2016; 2020; 2024

Bulgaria competed at the 2012 Winter Youth Olympics in Innsbruck, Austria. The Bulgarian team consisted of 11 athletes in 6 sports.

== Alpine skiing ==
Bulgaria qualified one boy and girl in alpine skiing.

Boy

Athlete	Event	Final			
Athlete	Event	Run 1	Run 2	Total	Rank
Georgi Nushev	Slalom	42.13	42.01	1:24.14	16
Georgi Nushev	Giant slalom	DNF			
Georgi Nushev	Super-G			1:09.11	29
Georgi Nushev	Combined	1:06.78	39.50	1:46.28	19

Girl

Athlete	Event	Final			
Athlete	Event	Run 1	Run 2	Total	Rank
Aleksandra Popova	Slalom	DNF			
Aleksandra Popova	Giant slalom	1:00.62	1:00.82	2:01.44	19
Aleksandra Popova	Super-G			1:11.92	25
Aleksandra Popova	Combined	1:11.34	41.13	1:52.47	23

== Biathlon ==
Bulgaria qualified a full team of two boys and girls.

Boys

Athlete	Event	Final		
Athlete	Event	Time	Misses	Rank
Radi Palevski	Sprint	22:23.9	3	34
Radi Palevski	Pursuit	33:19.6	3	26
Denislav Shehtanov	Sprint	22:49.1	4	42
Denislav Shehtanov	Pursuit	36:02.8	9	39

Girls

Athlete	Event	Final		
Athlete	Event	Time	Misses	Rank
Mariela Georgieva	Sprint	21:48.0	5	40
Mariela Georgieva	Pursuit	36:30.4	5	37
Daniela Kadeva	Sprint	21:19.7	2	38
Daniela Kadeva	Pursuit	37:26.1	5	42

Mixed

Athlete	Event	Final		
Athlete	Event	Time	Misses	Rank
Daniela Kadeva; Mariela Georgieva; Radi Palevski; Denislav Shehtanov	Mixed relay	1:20:19.6	1+8	15
Mariela Georgieva; Kameliya Ilieva; Radi Palevski; Simeon Deyanov	Cross-Country-Biathlon Mixed Relay	1:14:00.5	4+11	20

== Cross country skiing ==
Bulgaria qualified one boy and girl.

Boy

Athlete	Event	Final	
Athlete	Event	Time	Rank
Simeon Deyanov	10km classical	31:35.7	19

Girl

Athlete	Event	Final	
Athlete	Event	Time	Rank
Kameliya Ilieva	5km classical	DNF	

Sprint

Athlete	Event	Qualification		Quarterfinal		Semifinal		Final	
Athlete	Event	Total	Rank	Total	Rank	Total	Rank	Total	Rank
Simeon Deyanov	Boys' sprint	1:46.96	14 Q	1:50.9	3	did not advance			
Kameliya Ilieva	Girls' sprint	2:16.65	36	did not advance					

Mixed

Athlete	Event	Final		
Athlete	Event	Time	Misses	Rank
Mariela Georgieva; Kameliya Ilieva; Radi Palevski; Simeon Deyanov	Cross-Country-Biathlon Mixed Relay	1:14:00.5	4+11	20

== Luge ==
Bulgaria qualified one boy.

Boy

Athlete	Event	Final			
Athlete	Event	Run 1	Run 2	Total	Rank
Aleksandar Poibrenski	Boys' singles	41.275	41.153	1:22.428	21

== Ski jumping ==
Bulgaria qualified one boy.

Boy

Athlete	Event	1st Jump		2nd Jump		Overall	
Athlete	Event	Distance	Points	Distance	Points	Points	Rank
Deyan Funtarov	Boys' individual	52.5m	63.3	66.0m	103.2	166.5	21

== Snowboarding ==
Bulgaria qualified one boy.

Boy

Athlete	Event	Qualifying			Semifinal			Final		
Athlete	Event	Run 1	Run 2	Rank	Run 1	Run 2	Rank	Run 1	Run 2	Rank
Georgi Mihaylov	Boys' slopestyle	50.25	65.00	8 Q				47.50	48.25	13

== See also ==
- Bulgaria at the 2012 Summer Olympics
