= Dean Travers =

Caymanian alpine skier (born 1996)

Personal information
- Born: 17 June 1996 (age 30)

Skiing career
- Sport: Alpine skiing

Dean Travers (born 17 June 1996) is a Caymanian alpine ski racer.

He competed at the 2015 World Championships in Beaver Creek, USA, in the Super-G.

Dow Travers is his older brother and Anthony Travers is his father.
