= Roni Remme =

Canadian-German alpine skier

Personal information
- Born: 14 February 1996 (age 30) Etobicoke, Ontario, Canada
- Height: 168 cm (5 ft 6 in)
- Website: roniremme.com

Skiing career
- Sport: Alpine skiing
- Club: Alpine Ski Club (Collingwood), University of Utah
- Disciplines: Slalom, Super-G, Combined, Downhill
- World Cup debut: 1 December 2017 (age 21)

Olympics
- Teams: 2
- Medals: 0

World Championships
- Teams: 1 – (2019)
- Medals: 0

World Cup
- Seasons: 6 – (2018–2022, 2025)
- Wins: 0
- Podiums: 1 – (1 AC)
- Overall titles: 0 – (41st in 2019)
- Discipline titles: 0 – (2nd in AC, 2019)

Veronica "Roni" Remme (born 14 February 1996) is a Canadian-born German World Cup alpine ski racer.

From Collingwood, Ontario, Remme began racing at Alpine Ski Club. She grew to racing collegiately in the United States for the University of Utah. She made her World Cup debut in December 2017 and gained her first World Cup podium in February 2019, placing second at Crans Montana (SUI). She competed for Canada at the 2018 Winter Olympics, the 2019 World Championships, and the 2022 Winter Olympics.

On October 12, 2022 Remme announced that she would compete for the German National Team from the 2022-23 season onwards.

== World Cup results ==
=== Season standings ===
Season	Age	Overall	Slalom	Giant slalom	Super-G	Downhill	Combined
2018	22	96	37	—	—	—	—
2019	23	41	'20	—	47	44	2
2020	24	53	25	—	—	47	7

=== Podium finishes ===
- 1 podium (1 AC)

Season	Date	Location	Discipline	Position
2019	24 Feb 2019	Crans-Montana, Switzerland	Combined	2

== World Championship results ==
Year	Age	Slalom	Giant slalom	Super-G	Downhill	Combined
2019	23	12	—	DNS	28	5

== Olympic results ==
Year	Age	Slalom	Giant slalom	Super-G	Downhill	Combined
2018	22	27	—	37	23	DNF1
2022	26	---	---	24	24	DNF1
