= Croatia at the 2012 Winter Youth Olympics =

- IOC code: CRO
- NOC: Croatian Olympic Committee
- Website: www.hoo.hr

in Innsbruck
- Competitors: 9 in 6 sports
- Flag bearer: Istok Rodeš
- Medals: Gold 0 Silver 0 Bronze 0 Total 0

Winter Youth Olympics appearances (overview)
- 2012; 2016; 2020; 2024

Croatia competed at the 2012 Winter Youth Olympics in Innsbruck, Austria. The Croatian team was made up of 9 athletes competing in 6 different sports.

== Alpine skiing ==
Croatia qualified one boy and girl in alpine skiing.

Boy

Athlete	Event	Final			
Athlete	Event	Run 1	Run 2	Total	Rank
Istok Rodeš	Slalom	41.15	40.84	1:21.99	9
Istok Rodeš	Giant slalom	57.82	56.64	1:54.46	6
Istok Rodeš	Super-G			DNF	
Istok Rodeš	Combined	1:05.51	37.70	1:43.21	9

Girl

Athlete	Event	Final			
Athlete	Event	Run 1	Run 2	Total	Rank
Saša Tršinski	Slalom	41.95	DNF		
Saša Tršinski	Giant slalom	59.40	1:00.16	1:59.56	11
Saša Tršinski	Super-G			1:07.07	12
Saša Tršinski	Combined	1:06.93	38.28	1:45.21	14

== Biathlon ==
Croatia qualified one boy.

Boy

Athlete	Event	Final		
Athlete	Event	Time	Misses	Rank
Matej Burić	Sprint	21:28.3	2	19
Matej Burić	Pursuit	32:55.8	6	21

== Cross country skiing ==
Croatia qualified a team of one boy and one girl.

Boy

Athlete	Event	Final	
Athlete	Event	Time	Rank
Krešimir Crnković	10km classical	33:27.4	32

Girl

Athlete	Event	Final	
Athlete	Event	Time	Rank
Rea Raušel	5km classical	16:59.1	25

Sprint

Athlete	Event	Qualification		Quarterfinal		Semifinal		Final	
Athlete	Event	Total	Rank	Total	Rank	Total	Rank	Total	Rank
Krešimir Crnković	Boys' sprint	1:54.08	35	did not advance					
Rea Raušel	Girls' sprint	2:15.16	35	did not advance					

== Ice hockey ==
Croatia qualified one boy to compete in the skills challenge competition.

Athlete(s)	Event	Qualification		Grand final	
Athlete(s)	Event	Points	Rank	Points	Rank
Matija Miličić	Individual skills	11	8 Q	14	6

== Luge ==
Croatia qualified two girls.

Girls

Athlete	Event	Final			
Athlete	Event	Run 1	Run 2	Total	Rank
Ema Bago	Girls' singles	42.351	42.379	1:24.730	22
Petra Petko	Girls' singles	42.094	41.780	1:23.874	21

== Snowboarding ==
Croatia qualified a girl to compete in both halfpipe and slopestyle. However one athlete contested both events.

Girl

Athlete	Event	Qualifying			Semifinal			Final		
Athlete	Event	Run 1	Run 2	Rank	Run 1	Run 2	Rank	Run 1	Run 2	Rank
Paulina Berislavić	Girls' halfpipe	8.75	5.75	16	did not advance					
Paulina Berislavić	Girls' slopestyle	10.25	19.50	13				did not advance		

== See also ==
- Croatia at the 2012 Summer Olympics
