= Florence Bell (skier) =

Irish alpine skier (born 1996)

Personal information
- Born: 5 March 1996 (age 30) Sutton Coldfield, England

Sport
- Country: Ireland
- Sport: Alpine skiing

Florence Bell (born 5 March 1996 in Sutton Coldfield, England) is an alpine skier who represents Ireland in international competitions. She is the younger sister of Alpine skier Victoria Bell.

In 2012 Florence was the only Irish athlete at the inaugural Winter Youth Olympics in Innsbruck, Austria, where she competed in Slalom and Giant Slalom and where her result in Slalom gave Ireland its best ever Alpine skiing result of any Olympic event.

In 2013 Florence was a member of her school team (King Edward VI Handsworth School, Birmingham, England) that won "Overall School" and "Overall Team" victories and 23 other podium places at the British Schoolgirl Races in Flaine, France which was a record in the 50-year history of the event. Individually, Florence won the "Overall" title at the same event. In the same year, she competed at the European Youth Olympics in Brașov, Romania.

She raced at the 2014 Winter Olympics in the giant slalom and slalom events.

In 2015 Florence skied Slalom and Giant Slalom at the FIS Alpine World Ski Championships 2015 in Vail & Beaver Creek, USA

== See also ==
- 2012 Winter Youth Olympics
- Ireland at the 2014 Winter Olympics
