= Spain at the 2012 Winter Youth Olympics =

- IOC code: ESP
- NOC: Spanish Olympic Committee
- Website: www.coe.es

in Innsbruck
- Competitors: 9 in 5 sports
- Flag bearer: Manex Azula
- Medals: Gold 0 Silver 0 Bronze 0 Total 0

Winter Youth Olympics appearances (overview)
- 2012; 2016; 2020; 2024

Spain competed at the 2012 Winter Youth Olympics in Innsbruck, Austria. The Spanish team consisted of 9 athletes competing in 5 sports.

== Alpine skiing ==
Spain qualified 2 athletes.

Boys

Athlete	Event	Final			
Athlete	Event	Run 1	Run 2	Total	Rank
Adria Bertran	Slalom	DNF			
Adria Bertran	Giant slalom	59.94	DNF		
Adria Bertran	Super-G			1:08.21	24
Adria Bertran	Combined	1:06:88	DNF		

Girls

Athlete	Event	Final			
Athlete	Event	Run 1	Run 2	Total	Rank
Ona Rocamora	Slalom	DNF			
Ona Rocamora	Giant slalom	1:01.12	1:01.38	2:02.50	22
Ona Rocamora	Super-G			1:08.99	19
Ona Rocamora	Combined	DNF			

== Cross-country skiing ==
Spain qualified 2 athletes.

Boys

Athlete	Event	Final	
Athlete	Event	Time	Rank
Adrian Clavero	10km classical	34:52.2	36

Girls

Athlete	Event	Final	
Athlete	Event	Time	Rank
Yaiza Barajas	5km classical	19:04.0	36

Sprint

Athlete	Event	Qualification		Quarterfinal		Semifinal		Final	
Athlete	Event	Total	Rank	Total	Rank	Total	Rank	Total	Rank
Adrian Clavero	Boys' sprint	1:51.80	31	did not advance					
Yaiza Barajas	Girls' sprint	2:04.37	20 Q	2:12.6	6	did not advance			

== Ice Hockey ==
Spain qualified 2 athletes.

Boys

Athlete(s)	Event	Qualification		Grand final	
Athlete(s)	Event	Points	Rank	Points	Rank
Paul Cerda	Individual skills	0	16	did not advance	

Girls

Athlete(s)	Event	Qualification		Grand final	
Athlete(s)	Event	Points	Rank	Points	Rank
Irene Senac	Individual skills	8	11	did not advance	

== Skeleton ==
Spain qualified 1 athlete.

Boys

Athlete	Event	Final			
Athlete	Event	Run 1	Run 2	Total	Rank
Marc Alcaraz	Boys' individual	1:00.98	1:01.40	2:02.38	13

== Snowboarding ==
Spain qualified 2 athletes.

Boys

Athlete	Event	Qualifying			Semifinal			Final		
Athlete	Event	Run 1	Run 2	Rank	Run 1	Run 2	Rank	Run 1	Run 2	Rank
Manex Azula	Boys' halfpipe	35.00	49.00	10	did not advance					
Manex Azula	Boys' slopestyle	40.00	62.25	9 Q				29.00	33.50	17

Girls

Athlete	Event	Qualifying			Semifinal			Final		
Athlete	Event	Run 1	Run 2	Rank	Run 1	Run 2	Rank	Run 1	Run 2	Rank
Sara Eguibar	Girls' halfpipe	35.50	31.25	11	did not advance					

== See also ==
- Spain at the 2012 Summer Olympics
