= 2012 Winter Youth Olympics =

Multi-sport event in Innsbruck, Austria

I Winter Youth Olympic Games
- Location: Innsbruck, Austria
- Motto: Be part of it (German: Teil sein ist alles)
- Nations: 69
- Athletes: 1,059
- Events: 63 in 7 sports
- Opening: 13 January
- Closing: 22 January
- Opened by: President Heinz Fischer
- Closed by: IOC president Jacques Rogge
- Cauldron: Egon Zimmermann; Franz Klammer
- Stadium: Bergiselschanze (opening) / Maria-Theresa Street (closing)

The 2012 Winter Youth Olympic Games (German: Olympische Jugend-Winterspiele 2012), officially known as the I Winter Youth Olympic Games (YOG), were an international multi-sport event for youths that took place in Innsbruck, Austria, on 13–22 January 2012. They were the inaugural Winter Youth Olympics, a major sports and cultural festival celebrated in the tradition of the Olympic Games. Approximately 1100 athletes from 70 countries competed. The decision for Innsbruck to host the Games was announced on 12 December 2008 after mail voting by 105 International Olympic Committee (IOC) members. Innsbruck is the first city to host three winter Olympic events, having previously hosted the 1964 Winter Olympics and the 1976 Winter Olympics.

== Organization ==
=== Host city election ===
Location of Innsbruck in Austria.

All four applicant cities were kept as candidate cities by the IOC in August 2008. Swedish skier Pernilla Wiberg was the Evaluation Chair for the commission to score the applicant cities. In the November 2008, Harbin and Lillehammer did not make the shortlist, leaving only Kuopio and Innsbruck in the running. On 12 December, the final vote was revealed to be 84 votes to 15, with Innsbruck winning the hosting rights.

=== Infrastructure and budget ===
All venues that were used for the 2012 Winter Youth Olympics were existing (besides the athlete's village) when Innsbruck was awarded the games in 2008. Innsbruck thus proposed a budget of $22.5 million USDs to host and stage the games. The athlete's village was estimated to cost roughly $121 million to build.

=== Marketing ===
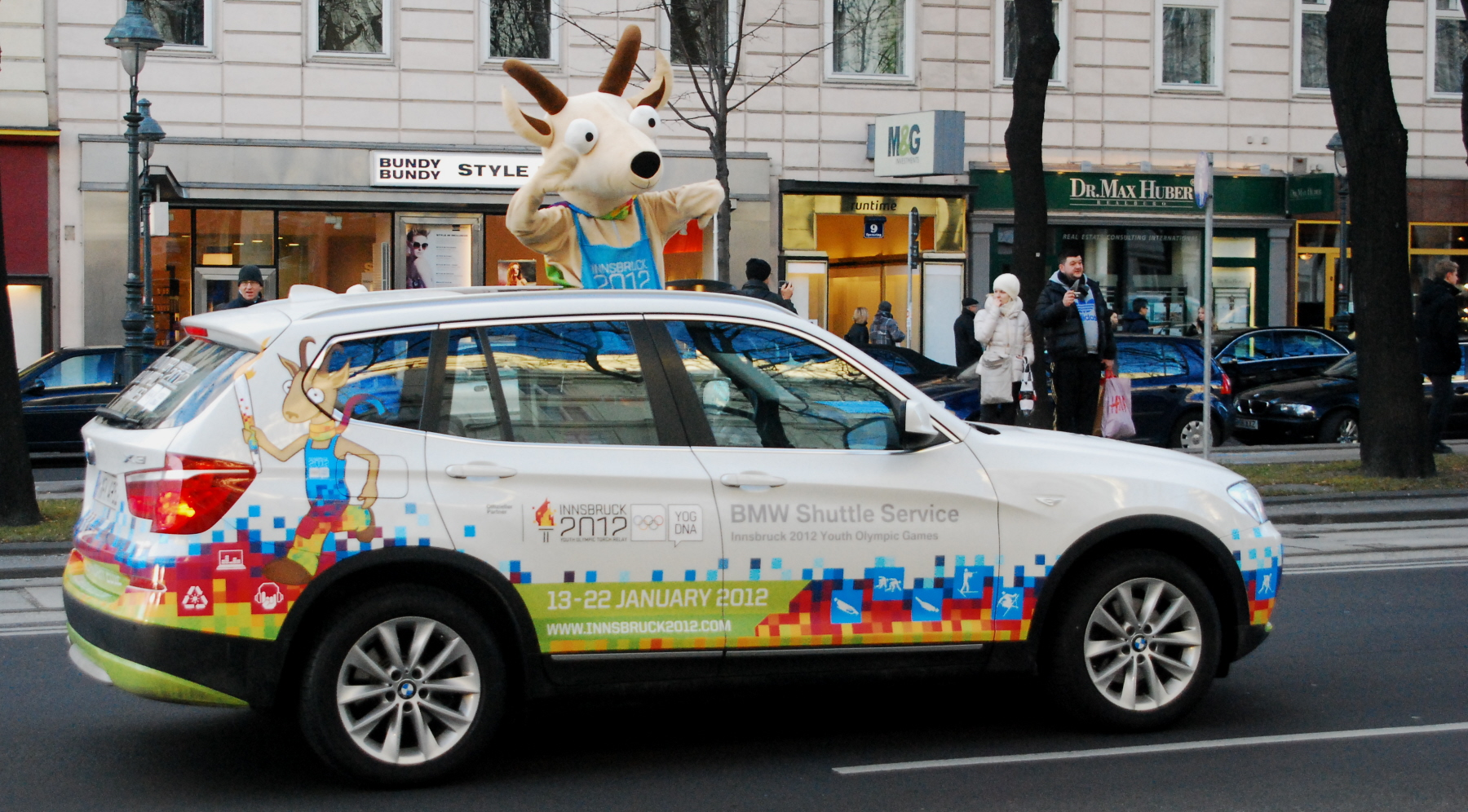
A BMW car with the Innsbruck 2012 logo while the mascot for the games looks on.

Marketing for the games included sponsor BMW painting cars with the Innsbruck 2012 logo and information to spread awareness across Austria.

=== Sponsors ===
There are twelve official worldwide partners of the International Olympic Committee such as McDonald's and Coca-Cola, which were designated as "World Olympic Partners" by the organizing committee for the event. The organizing committee also designated fifteen companies as official sponsors and suppliers of which include BMW and Raiffeisen Zentralbank among others. About 60% of the costs associated with the games were expected to be covered by sponsorship by the various companies.

Sponsors of the 2012 Winter Youth Olympics
Worldwide Olympic Partners	Atos; The Coca-Cola Company; Dow Chemical Company; General Electric; McDonald's; Omega SA; Panasonic; Procter & Gamble; Samsung Electronics; Visa Inc.
National Premium Partners	BMW; Raiffeisen Zentralbank
Official Sponsors	Tiroler Tageszeitung
Official Suppliers	Austrian Airlines

=== Mascot ===
Yoggl

Mascot of the 2012 Winter Youth Olympics (Innsbruck)
- Creator: Florencia Demaría and Luis Andrés Abbiati
- Significance: An anthropomorphic chamois

The official mascot of the 2012 Winter Youth Olympics is an anthropomorphic chamois named Yoggl (pronounced YOG). The name is a compound of "Joggl", the Tyrolean nickname for Jakob, and YOG, the acronym of the Youth Olympic Games. He represents respect for nature, the lifestyles and geography of the host country, modernity, youth, and athleticism. The mascot was designed by Florencia Demaría and Luis Andrés Abbiati of Argentina.

=== Venues ===
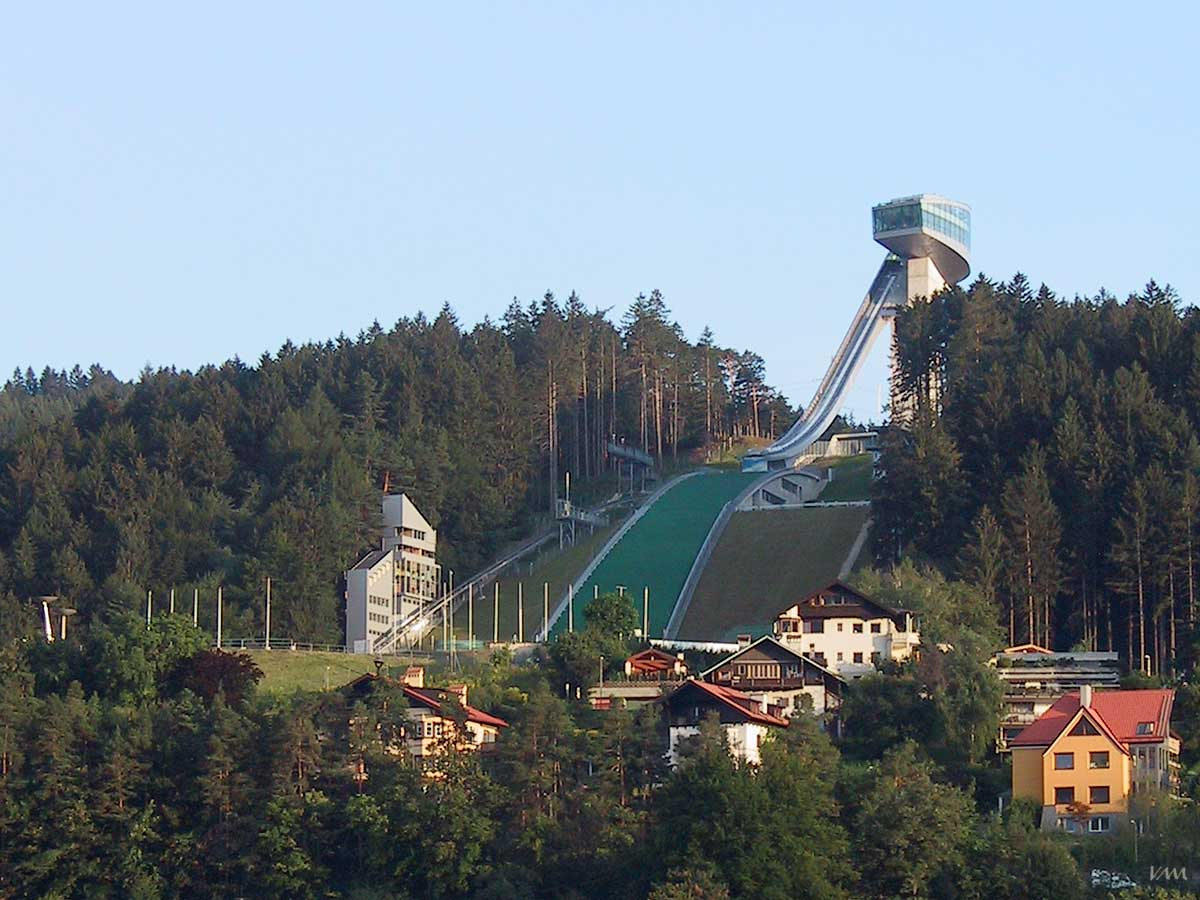
Bergiselschanze staged the Opening ceremony of the event.

All of the venues were located at venue clusters in two major zones in Innsbruck and Seefeld, Olympiaworld Innsbruck and Seefeld Arena. All venues were existing with the exception of the curling and biathlon venues, which were temporary.

Venue	Location	Sports	Capacity
Bergiselschanze	Innsbruck	Opening ceremony	28,000
Olympic Sliding Centre Innsbruck	Innsbruck	Bobsleigh; Luge; Skeleton	1,500
Seefeld Nordic	Seefeld	Biathlon; Cross-country skiing Nordic combined Ski jumping	2,500
Eisschnellaufbahn	Innsbruck	Speed skating	2,900
Kühtai	Innsbruck	Freestyle skiing Snowboarding	1,000
Tyrolean Ice Arena	Innsbruck	Ice hockey	3,130
Olympiahalle	Innsbruck	Figure skating Short track speed skating	10,000
Patscherkofel	Innsbruck	Alpine skiing	N/A
Innsbruck Exhibition Centre	Innsbruck	Curling	1,000
Maria-Theresa Street	Innsbruck	Medals Plaza; Closing Ceremonies	-

=== Torch relay ===
The torch relay of the Games was announced on 9 October 2011, involving 65 sites over 18 days with some 2,012 torchbearers carrying the flame. The torch was lit on 17 December 2011 in Athens, Greece by the first torchbearer Carlos Pecharromán from Spain and the relay began in Innsbruck on 27 December 2011 and ended with the opening ceremony in Bergiselschanze on 13 January 2012. It is the first time the Olympic flame had gone to the same city three times as Innsbruck was also the host of the Winter Olympic Games in 1964 and 1976.

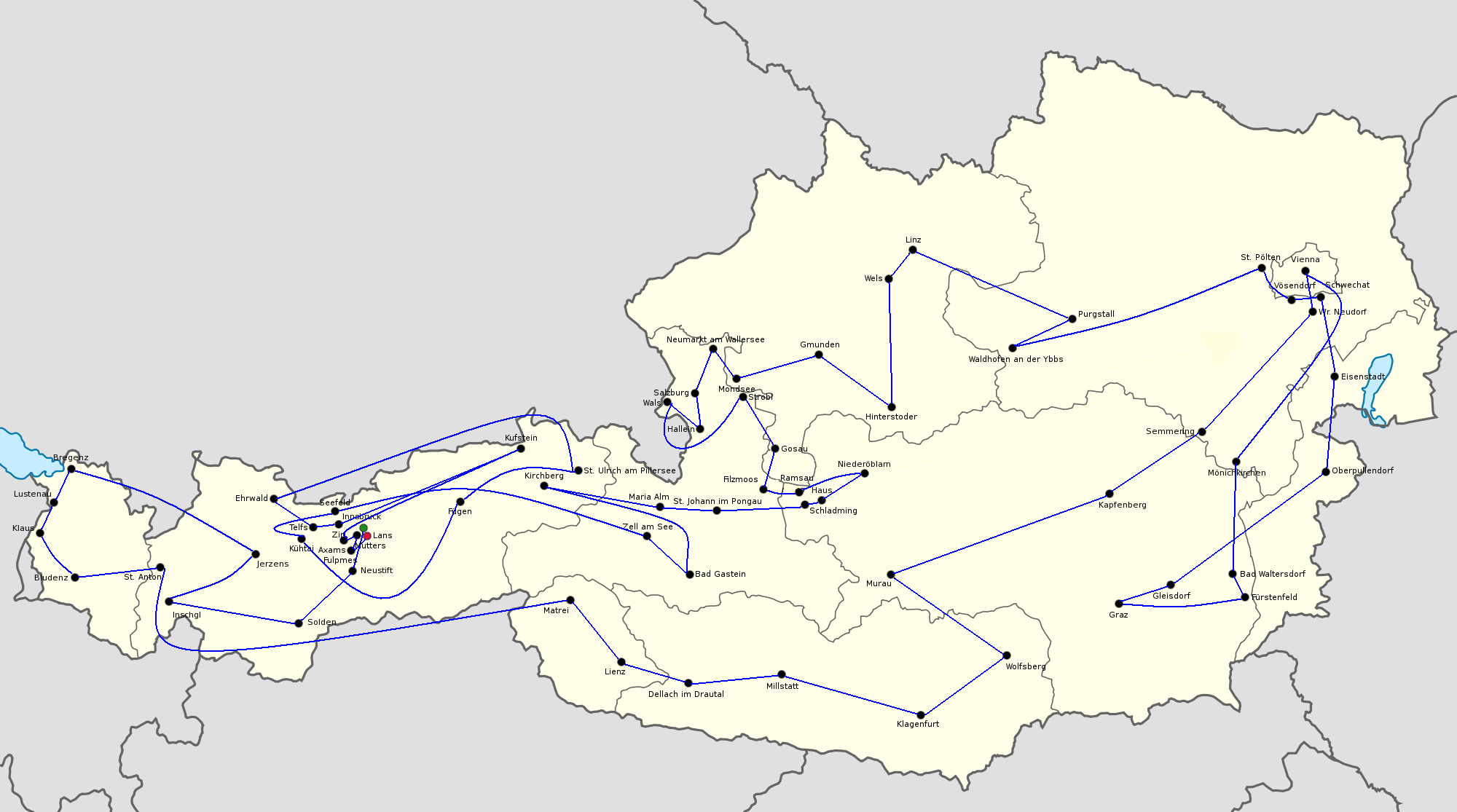
Route of 2012 Winter Youth Olympics torch relay

Below is the list of route locations:

- 27 December: Innsbruck, Neustift im Stubaital, Sölden, Ischgl
- 28 December: Jerzens, Bregenz, Lustenau, Klaus, Bludenz
- 29 December: Sankt Anton am Arlberg, Matrei, Lienz, Dellach
- 30 December: Millstatt, Klagenfurt, Wolfsberg, Murau
- 31 December: Kapfenberg, Semmering, Wiener Neudorf
- 1 January: Vienna, Mönichkirchen
- 2 January: Bad Waltersdorf, Fürstenfeld
- 3 January: Graz, Gleisdorf, Oberpullendorf
- 4 January: Eisenstadt, Schwechat, Vösendorf, Sankt Pölten
- 5 January: Waidhofen an der Ybbs, Purgstall, Linz, Wels
- 6 January: Hinterstoder, Gmunden, Mondsee, Neumarkt am Wallersee, Salzburg, Hallein
- 7 January: Wals, Strobl, Gosau, Filzmoos
- 8 January: Ramsau, Niederoblarn, Haus
- 9 January: Schladming, Sankt Johann im Pongau, Maria Alm
- 10 January: Kirchberg, Bad Gastein, Zell am See
- 11 January: Seefeld, Kühtai, Fugen
- 12 January: Sankt Ulrich am Pillersee, Ehrwald, Telfs, Zirl
- 13 January: Kufstein, Axams, Mutters, Fulpmes, Lans

== The Games ==
=== Opening ceremony ===
The opening ceremony of the games took place on 13 January 2012, at 6:30 pm CET (5:30 UTC, 13 January) at Bergiselschanze. Roughly 15,000 people packed the snow-filled stadium to watch the ceremony, where for the first time three cauldrons were lit (instead of the normal 1) to commemorate the previous two Winter Olympics Innsbruck has hosted (1964 and 1976). Heinz Fischer, the President of Austria declared the games open.

=== Closing ceremony ===
The closing ceremony took place on 22 January. IOC President Jacques Rogge stated that the first Winter Youth Olympic Games were "ten glorious days" and that the games "exceeded all expectations and laid solid foundations for future Youth Olympic Games".

=== Participating nations ===
In accordance with IOC guidelines, only youths aged between 14 and 19 years were able to participate in the 2012 Winter Youth Olympics. Unlike the Olympic Games, the youth athletes taking part in the YOG will be expected to stay in the host city throughout the Games to take part in an integrated sport and culture and education programme (CEP). The qualification criteria for participation in the Games differs by sport, and are determined by the NOCs and international sports federations.

Participating National Olympic Committees
- Andorra (4)
- Argentina (5)
- Armenia (3)
- Australia (13)
- Austria (81)
- Belarus (16)
- Belgium (7)
- Bosnia and Herzegovina (4)
- Brazil (2)
- Bulgaria (11)
- Canada (52)
- Cayman Islands (1)
- Chile (5)
- China (23)
- Croatia (9)
- Cyprus (1)
- Czech Republic (24)
- Denmark (5)
- Eritrea (1)
- Estonia (17)
- Finland (42)
- France (29)
- Georgia (2)
- Germany (54)
- Great Britain (24)
- Greece (3)
- Hungary (9)
- Iceland (3)
- India (1)
- Iran (3)
- Ireland (1)
- Italy (41)
- Japan (33)
- Kazakhstan (38)
- South Korea (28)
- Kyrgyzstan (1)
- Latvia (16)
- Lebanon (2)
- Liechtenstein (2)
- Lithuania (6)
- Luxembourg (1)
- Macedonia (2)
- Mexico (1)
- Moldova (1)
- Monaco (3)
- Mongolia (2)
- Montenegro (1)
- Morocco (1)
- Nepal (1)
- Netherlands (18)
- New Zealand (15)
- Norway (28)
- Peru (1)
- Philippines (2)
- Poland (19)
- Romania (22)
- Russia (67)
- San Marino (1)
- Serbia (2)
- Slovakia (30)
- Slovenia (21)
- South Africa (1)
- Spain (9)
- Sweden (35)
- Switzerland (26)
- Chinese Taipei (4)
- Turkey (4)
- Ukraine (23)
- United States (57)
- Uzbekistan (1)

==== Number of athletes by National Olympic Committee ====
IOC Letter Code	Country	Athletes
AUT	Austria	81
RUS	Russia	67
USA	United States	57
GER	Germany	54
CAN	Canada	52
FIN	Finland	42
ITA	Italy	41
KAZ	Kazakhstan	38
SWE	Sweden	35
JPN	Japan	33
SVK	Slovakia	30
FRA	France	29
KOR	South Korea	28
NOR	Norway	28
SUI	Switzerland	26
CZE	Czech Republic	24
GBR	Great Britain	24
CHN	China	23
UKR	Ukraine	23
ROM	Romania	22
SLO	Slovenia	21
POL	Poland	19
NED	Netherlands	18
EST	Estonia	17
BLR	Belarus	16
LAT	Latvia	16
NZL	New Zealand	15
AUS	Australia	13
BUL	Bulgaria	11
CRO	Croatia	9
HUN	Hungary	9
ESP	Spain	9
BEL	Belgium	7
LTU	Lithuania	6
ARG	Argentina	5
CHI	Chile	5
DEN	Denmark	5
AND	Andorra	4
BIH	Bosnia and Herzegovina	4
TPE	Chinese Taipei	4
TUR	Turkey	4
ARM	Armenia	3
GRE	Greece	3
ISL	Iceland	3
IRI	Iran	3
MON	Monaco	3
BRA	Brazil	2
GEO	Georgia	2
LIB	Lebanon	2
LIE	Liechtenstein	2
MKD	Macedonia	2
MGL	Mongolia	2
PHI	Philippines	2
SRB	Serbia	2
CAY	Cayman Islands	1
CYP	Cyprus	1
ERI	Eritrea	1
IND	India	1
IRL	Ireland	1
KGZ	Kyrgyzstan	1
LUX	Luxembourg	1
MEX	Mexico	1
MDA	Moldova	1
MNE	Montenegro	1
MAR	Morocco	1
NEP	Nepal	1
PER	Peru	1
SMR	San Marino	1
RSA	South Africa	1
UZB	Uzbekistan	1

=== Sports ===
The YOG featured 63 medal events over 7 sports and 15 disciplines. 63 events, there will be 3 mixed team events (Mixed-NOCs), 8 mixed team events (NOCs), 27 men's events, and 25 women's events.

- Alpine skiing (9)
- Biathlon (5)
- Bobsleigh (2)
- Cross-country skiing (4)
- Curling (2)
- Figure skating (5)
- Freestyle skiing (4)
- Ice hockey (4)
- Luge (4)
- Nordic combined (1)
- Short track speed skating (5)
- Skeleton (2)
- Ski jumping (3)
- Snowboarding (4)
- Speed skating (8)

== Calendar ==
OC	Opening ceremony	●	Event competitions	1	Event finals	EG	Exhibition Gala	CC	Closing ceremony

January	13 Fri	14 Sat	15 Sun	16 Mon	17 Tue	18 Wed	19 Thu	20 Fri	21 Sat	22 Sun	Events
Ceremonies	OC									CC	
Alpine skiing		2	2		1	1	1	1	1		9
Biathlon			2	2			1				5
Bobsleigh										2	2
Cross-country skiing					2		2				4
Curling		●	●	●	●	1		●	●	1	2
Figure skating		●	●	2	2				1	EG	5
Freestyle skiing		●	2				●		2		4
Ice hockey	●	●	●	●	●	●	2	●	●	2	4
Luge			1	2	1						4
Mixed sports									1		1
Nordic combined			1								1
Short track speed skating						2	2		1		5
Skeleton									2		2
Ski jumping		2							1		3
Snowboarding		●	2				2				4
Speed skating		2		2		2		2			8
Total events		6	10	8	6	6	10	3	9	5	63
Cumulative total		6	16	24	30	36	46	49	58	63	
January	13 Fri	14 Sat	15 Sun	16 Mon	17 Tue	18 Wed	19 Thu	20 Fri	21 Sat	22 Sun	Events

== Medal table ==
The top ten listed National Olympic Committees (NOCs) by number of gold medals are listed below with the host nation, Austria, being highlighted. A competition was announced in early 2011 to design the medals that were awarded at the games.

Medals won by teams of athletes from more than one NOC are included in the table as medals awarded to a mixed-NOCs team. There were three events which composed entirely of mixed-NOCs teams, and as such all nine medals in these events, were swept by mixed-NOCs teams.

* Host nation (Austria)

Rank	Nation	Gold	Silver	Bronze	Total
1	Germany	8	7	2	17
2	China	7	4	4	15
3	Austria*	6	4	3	13
4	South Korea	6	3	2	11
5	Russia	5	4	7	16
6	Netherlands	4	1	2	7
–	Mixed-NOCs	3	3	3	9
7	Switzerland	3	0	5	8
8	Japan	2	5	9	16
9	Norway	2	5	2	9
10	United States	2	3	3	8
11–30	Remaining	15	24	21	60
Totals (30 entries)		63	63	63	189

Source: IOC

First	Winter Youth Olympic Games; Innsbruck; 2012	Succeeded by Lillehammer
