= Speed skating at the 2012 Winter Youth Olympics =

Speed skating at the I Winter Youth Olympic Games
- Venue: Eisschnellaufbahn; Innsbruck
- Dates: 14–20 January
- Competitors: 56 from 20 nations

Speed skating at the 2012 Winter Youth Olympics was held at the Eisschnellaufbahn in Innsbruck, Austria, from 14 to 20 January.

== Medal summary ==
=== Medal table ===
Rank	Nation	Gold	Silver	Bronze	Total
1	China	4	2	0	6
2	South Korea	2	1	2	5
3	Netherlands	2	1	0	3
4	Japan	0	3	4	7
5	Belarus	0	1	0	1
6	Norway	0	0	1	1
6	Russia	0	0	1	1
Totals (7 entries)		8	8	8	24

=== Boys' events ===
Event	Gold		Silver		Bronze	
500 metres	Liu An; China	75.50	Roman Dubovik; Belarus	77.824	Toshihiro Kakui; Japan	77.827
1500 metres	Yang Fan; China	1:54.20	Liu An; China	2:00.28	Seitaro Ichinohe; Japan	2:00.30
3000 metres	Yang Fan; China	4:03.22	Seitaro Ichinohe; Japan	4:10.00	Noh Hyeok-jun; South Korea	4:14.41
Mass start	Yang Fan; China	7:10.23	Seitaro Ichinohe; Japan	7:11.45	Vasili Pudushkin; Russia	7:12.83

=== Girls' events ===
Event	Gold		Silver		Bronze	
500 metres	Jang Mi; South Korea	81.68	Shi Xiaoxuan; China	84.32	Martine Lilløy Bruun; Norway	87.51
1500 metres	Jang Mi; South Korea	2:08.17	Sanneke de Neeling; Netherlands	2:09.54	Sumire Kikuchi; Japan	2:11.33
3000 metres	Sanneke de Neeling; Netherlands	4:37.33	Rio Harada; Japan	4:41.85	Jang Su-ji; South Korea	4:42.72
Mass start	Sanneke de Neeling; Netherlands	6:01.06	Jang Su-ji; South Korea	6:01.13	Sumire Kikuchi; Japan	6:01.24

== Multi-medalists ==
Athletes who have won at least two medals.

Rank	Nation	Gold	Silver	Bronze	Total
1	Yang Fan (CHN)	3	0	0	3
2	Sanneke de Neeling (NED)	2	1	0	3
3	Jang Mi (KOR)	2	0	0	2
4	Liu An (CHN)	1	1	0	2
5	Seitaro Ichinohe (JPN)	0	2	1	3
6	Jang Su-ji (KOR)	0	1	1	2
7	Sumire Kikuchi (JPN)	0	0	2	2

== Qualification system ==
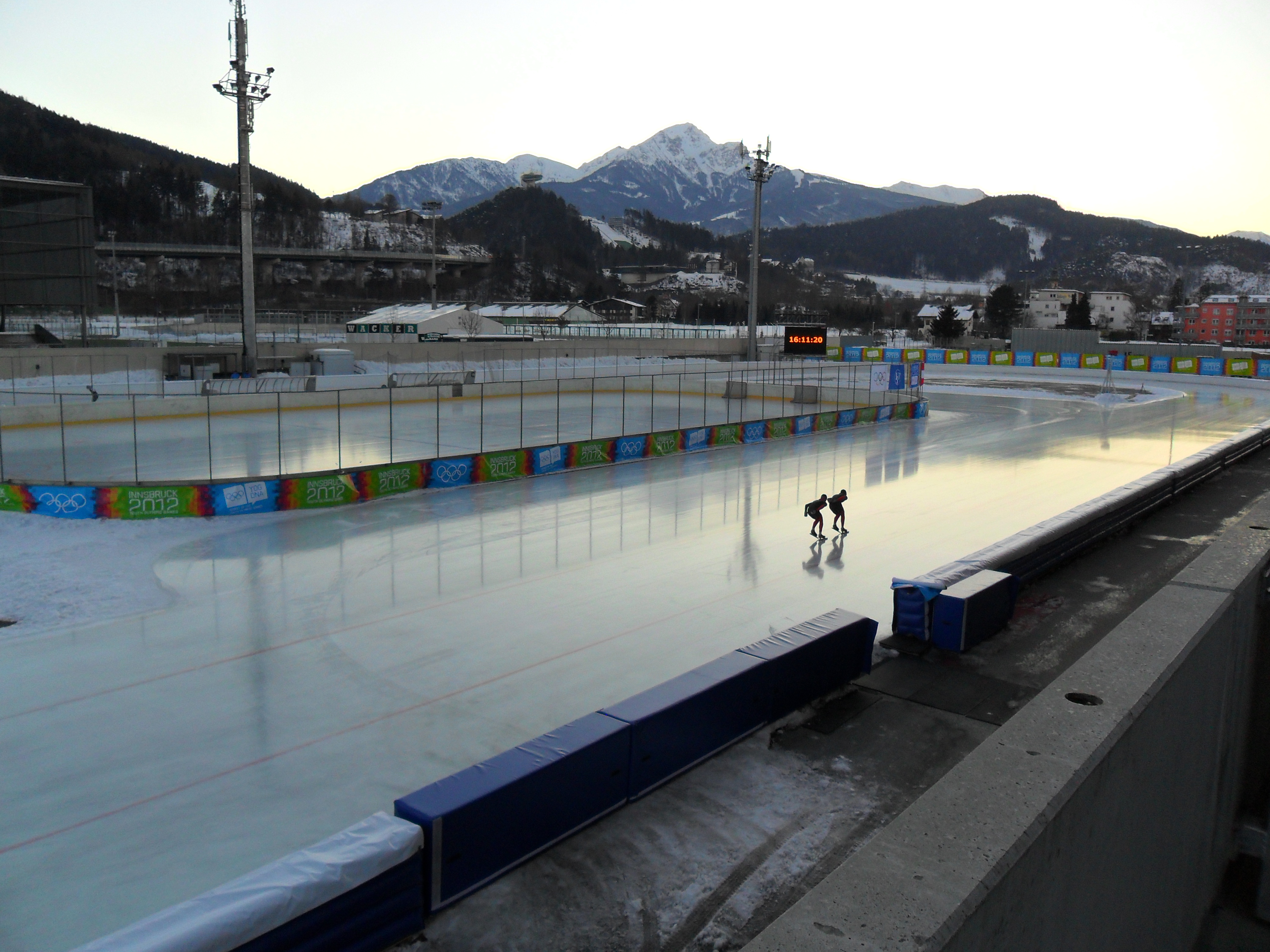
Trainingday at the Eisschnellaufbahn

Each country could send a maximum of four athletes to the speed skating events of the Winter Youth Olympics. The ISU Junior World Cup competition during the season was used to qualify in the respective distances. The host country (Austria) was given at least one spot.

Each country could send a maximum of four athletes to the speed skating events of the Winter Youth Olympics. The ISU Junior World Cup competition during the season was used to qualify in the respective distances. The host country (Austria) was given at least one spot.

Canada will not send any skaters after the governing body for the sport in the county deemed the event "not developmentally appropriate".

The final allocation of quotas was announced on November 30, 2011.

=== Qualification times ===
Athletes must have met the qualification times after October 10, 2010 to compete.

Event	Women	Men
500m	45.50	42.00
1500m	2:25.00	2:14.00
3000m	5:20.00	4:55:00

=== Qualified nations summary ===
NOC	Boys'	Girls'	Total
Austria	2		2
Belarus	2	2	4
Belgium		1	1
China	2	2	4
Czech Republic		1	1
Denmark	1		1
Finland	2		2
Germany	2	2	4
Italy	1	2	3
Japan	2	2	4
Kazakhstan	2	2	4
Mongolia		1	1
Netherlands	2	2	4
Norway	2	2	4
Poland	2	2	4
Romania	1	2	3
Russia	2	2	4
South Korea	2	2	4
Sweden	1		1
United States		1	1
Total athletes	28	28	56
Total NOCs	16	16	20

=== Qualification ===
Boys'

Event	Date	Location	Athletes per NOC	Qualified
Host Nation	-	-	2	Austria
World Junior Championships	March 2011	(Finland) Seinäjoki	2	South Korea; Norway; Netherlands; Japan
World Junior Championships	March 2011	(Finland) Seinäjoki	1	China; ~~Canada~~; Italy; Russia
2 ISU Junior World Cups	November 12 – 13, 2011; November 18 – 19, 2011	(Germany) Erfurt (Norway) Bjugn	1	Belarus; Belarus; China; Denmark; Finland; Finland; Germany; Germany; Kazakhstan; Kazakhstan; Poland; Poland; Romania; Russia; Sweden; ~~Switzerland~~
TOTAL			28	

Girls'

Event	Date	Location	Athletes per NOC	Qualified
Host Nation	-	-	–	~~Austria~~
World Junior Championships	March 2011	(Finland) Seinäjoki	2	Netherlands; South Korea; Norway; Japan
World Junior Championships	March 2011	(Finland) Seinäjoki	1	Kazakhstan; ~~Canada~~; Czech Republic
2 ISU Junior World Cups	November 12 – 13, 2011; November 18 – 19, 2011	(Germany) Erfurt (Norway) Bjugn	1	Belgium; Belarus; Belarus; China; China; ~~Estonia~~; Germany; Germany; Italy; Italy; Kazakhstan; Mongolia; Poland; Poland; Romania; Romania; Russia; Russia; ~~Switzerland~~; United States
TOTAL			28	

== See also ==
- 2012 World Junior Speed Skating Championships
