= Estonia at the 2012 Winter Youth Olympics =

- IOC code: EST
- NOC: Estonian Olympic Committee
- Website: www.eok.ee

in Innsbruck
- Competitors: 17 (9 boys, 8 girls) in 7 sports
- Flag bearer: Rene Zahkna
- Medals Ranked 21st: Gold 0 Silver 2 Bronze 0 Total 2

Winter Youth Olympics appearances (overview)
- 2012; 2016; 2020; 2024

Estonia competed at the 2012 Winter Youth Olympics in Innsbruck, Austria. The Estonian team consisted of 17 athletes in 7 sports.

== Medalists ==
Medal	Name	Sport	Event	Date
Silver	Rene Zahkna	Biathlon	Boys' sprint	15 Jan
Silver	Rene Zahkna	Biathlon	Boys' pursuit	16 Jan

== Alpine skiing ==
Estonia qualified one boy and girl in alpine skiing.

Boy

Athlete	Event	Final			
Athlete	Event	Run 1	Run 2	Total	Rank
Tõnis Luik	Slalom	42.45	40.97	1:23.42	14
Tõnis Luik	Giant slalom	59.72	55.80	1:55.52	9
Tõnis Luik	Super-G			1:09.00	28
Tõnis Luik	Combined	1:06.98	DSQ		

Girl

Athlete	Event	Final			
Athlete	Event	Run 1	Run 2	Total	Rank
Triin Tobi	Slalom	46.74	42.73	1:29.47	14
Triin Tobi	Giant slalom	1:03.49	1:03.18	2:06.67	27
Triin Tobi	Super-G			DNF	
Triin Tobi	Combined	DNF			

== Biathlon ==
Estonia qualified a full biathlon team of 2 boys and 2 girls.

Boys

Athlete	Event	Final		
Athlete	Event	Time	Misses	Rank
Tarvi Sikk	Sprint	21:29.5	2	20
Tarvi Sikk	Pursuit	34:42.6	9	34
Rene Zahkna	Sprint	19:43.0	1	2nd place, silver medalist(s)
Rene Zahkna	Pursuit	28:51.6	4	2nd place, silver medalist(s)

Girls

Athlete	Event	Final		
Athlete	Event	Time	Misses	Rank
Meril Beilmann	Sprint	19:46.6	3	21
Meril Beilmann	Pursuit	33:00.3	6	21
Maarja Maranik	Sprint	19:58.7	3	25
Maarja Maranik	Pursuit	34:22.9	9	33

Mixed

Athlete	Event	Final		
Athlete	Event	Time	Misses	Rank
Maarja Maranik; Meril Beilmann; Tarvi Sikk; Rene Zahkna	Mixed relay	1:17:29.3	4+18	8
Meril Beilmann; Kelly Vainlo; Rene Zahkna; Andreas Veerpalu	Cross-Country-Biathlon Mixed Relay	1:06:37.7	0+4	8

== Cross country skiing ==
Estonia qualified one boy and girl.

Boy

Athlete	Event	Final	
Athlete	Event	Time	Rank
Andreas Veerpalu	10km classical	30:42.2	8

Girl

Athlete	Event	Final	
Athlete	Event	Time	Rank
Kelly Vainlo	5km classical	16:40.1	21

Sprint

Athlete	Event	Qualification		Quarterfinal		Semifinal		Final	
Athlete	Event	Total	Rank	Total	Rank	Total	Rank	Total	Rank
Andreas Veerpalu	Boys' sprint	1:47.87	20 Q	1:48.0	3	Did not advance			
Kelly Vainlo	Girls' sprint	2:11.62	30 Q	2:07.3	5	Did not advance			

Mixed

Athlete	Event	Final		
Athlete	Event	Time	Misses	Rank
Meril Beilmann; Kelly Vainlo; Rene Zahkna; Andreas Veerpalu	Cross-Country-Biathlon Mixed Relay	1:06:37.7	0+4	8

== Curling ==
Estonia qualified a mixed team.

Team

Skip: Robert Päll
Third: Marie Turmann
Second: Sander Rõuk
Lead: Kerli Zirk

=== Mixed Team ===
Final Round Robin Standings

Blue Group	Skip	W	L
United States	Korey Dropkin	7	0
Switzerland	Michael Brunner	6	1
Czech Republic	Marek Černovský	4	3
China	Bai Yang	3	4
Norway	Markus Skogvold	3	4
South Korea	Kang Sue-yeon	2	5
New Zealand	Luke Steele	2	5
Estonia	Robert-Kent Päll	1	6

Draw 1

Sheet C	1	2	3	4	5	6	7	8	Final
Estonia (Päll)	0	0	0	0	1	0	X	X	1
United States (Dropkin)	2	2	1	4	0	1	X	X	10

Draw 2

Sheet D	1	2	3	4	5	6	7	8	Final
Czech Republic (Černovský)	0	2	0	2	0	3	2	X	9
Estonia (Päll)	2	0	1	0	1	0	0	X	4

Draw 3

Sheet A	1	2	3	4	5	6	7	8	Final
Switzerland (Brunner)	1	3	3	3	2	0	X	X	12
Estonia (Päll)	0	0	0	0	0	1	X	X	1

Draw 4

Sheet B	1	2	3	4	5	6	7	8	Final
New Zealand (Steele)	0	2	0	2	2	0	0	1	7
Estonia (Päll)	1	0	1	0	0	1	3	0	6

Draw 5

Sheet D	1	2	3	4	5	6	7	8	Final
Estonia (Turmann)	2	0	1	0	0	1	1	2	7
South Korea (Kang)	0	0	0	3	2	0	0	0	5

Draw 6

Sheet C	1	2	3	4	5	6	7	8	Final
China (Bai)	0	2	0	2	1	0	0	2	7
Estonia (Päll)	0	0	2	0	0	0	1	0	3

Draw 7

Sheet B	1	2	3	4	5	6	7	8	Final
Estonia (Päll)	2	0	1	0	0	0	X	X	3
Norway (Skogvold)	0	1	0	2	2	3	X	X	8

=== Mixed doubles ===
Round of 32

Sheet D	1	2	3	4	5	6	7	8	Final
Mikhail Vaskov (RUS); Zuzana Hrůzová (CZE)	0	5	1	1	1	1	1	X	10
Marie Turmann (EST); Alessandro Zoppi (ITA)	3	0	0	0	0	0	0	X	3

Sheet A	1	2	3	4	5	6	7	8	Final
Elena Stern (SUI); Sander Rõuk (EST)	2	0	0	0	1	0	X	X	3
Korey Dropkin (USA); Marina Verenich (RUS)	0	2	1	4	0	6	X	X	13

Sheet C	1	2	3	4	5	6	7	8	Final
Robert-Kent Päll (EST); Emily Gray (CAN)	0	0	0	2	0	0	0	X	2
Anastasia Moskaleva (RUS); Tsukasa Horigome (JPN)	1	1	3	0	1	1	1	X	8

Sheet B	1	2	3	4	5	6	7	8	Final
Stine Haalien (NOR); Alexandr Korshunov (RUS)	0	0	0	0	1	0	0	X	1
Rasmus Wranå (SWE); Kerli Zirk (EST)	1	3	1	1	0	1	1	X	8

Round of 16

Sheet D	1	2	3	4	5	6	7	8	Final
Duncan Menzies (GBR); Taylor Anderson (USA)	1	0	0	2	1	0	0	2	6
Rasmus Wranå (SWE); Kerli Zirk (EST)	0	1	1	0	0	1	1	0	4

== Figure skating ==
Estonia qualified three athletes (one ice dance couple and one girl singles athlete).

Athlete	Event	SP/OD		FS/FD		Total	Rank
Athlete	Event	Points	Rank	Points	Rank	Total	Rank
Sindra Kriisa	Girls' singles	34.43	13	58.00	15	92.43	15
Andrei Davõdov; Victoria-Laura Lõhmus	Ice dancing	26.67	12	44.11	10	70.78	12

Mixed

Athletes	Event	Boys'			Girls'			Ice Dance			Total	
Athletes	Event	Score	Rank	Points	Score	Rank	Points	Score	Rank	Points	Points	Rank
Team 7 Lee June-hyoung (KOR); Micol Cristini (ITA); Victoria-Laura Lõhmus/Andrei Davõdov (EST)	Team Trophy	109.30	3	6	65.60	6	3	45.60	6	3	12	7
Team 8 Timofei Novaikin (FRA); Sindra Kriisa (EST); Aleksandra Nazarova/Maxim Nikitin (UKR)	Team Trophy	99.56	4	5	58.52	8	1	78.44	2	7	13	4

== Nordic combined ==
Estonia qualified one boy athlete.

Boy

Athlete	Event	Ski jumping		Cross-country		Final	
Athlete	Event	Points	Rank	Deficit	Ski Time	Total Time	Rank
Kristjan Ilves	Boys' individual	124.5	8	0:52	26:50.9	27:42.9	7

== Ski jumping ==
Estonia qualified one boy athlete.

Boy

Athlete	Event	1st Jump		2nd Jump		Overall	
Athlete	Event	Distance	Points	Distance	Points	Points	Rank
Rauno Loit	Boys' individual	65.5m	103.5	65.5m	105.5	207.0	13

== See also ==
- Estonia at the 2012 Summer Olympics
