= Speed skating at the 2012 Winter Youth Olympics – Girls' 3000 metres =

Girls' 3000 metres at the I Winter Youth Olympic Games
- Venue: Eisschnellaufbahn
- Date: January 18, 2012
- Competitors: 16 from 15 nations
- Winning time: 4:37.33

Medalists
1st place, gold medalist(s)		Sanneke de Neeling	Netherlands
2nd place, silver medalist(s)		Rio Harada	Japan
3rd place, bronze medalist(s)		Jang Su-ji	South Korea

The girls' 3000 metres speed skating competition of the Innsbruck 2012 Winter Youth Olympics was held at Eisschnellaufbahn on 18 January 2012.

== Results ==
The races were held at 11:00.

Rank	Pair	Lane	Name	Country	Time	Time Behind
1st place, gold medalist(s)	5	o	Sanneke de Neeling	Netherlands	4:37.33	
2nd place, silver medalist(s)	7	i	Rio Harada	Japan	4:41.85	+4.52
3rd place, bronze medalist(s)	7	o	Jang Su-ji	South Korea	4:42.72	+5.39
4	6	i	Elizaveta Kazelina	Russia	4:44.45	+7.12
5	8	i	Fu Yuan	China	4:47.52	+10.19
6	5	i	Aleksandra Kapruziak	Poland	4:51.48	+14.15
7	8	o	Michelle Uhrig	Germany	4:53.47	+16.14
8	6	o	Clare Jeong	United States	4:54.04	+16.71
9	1	i	Inga Anne Vasaasen	Norway	4:55.71	+18.38
10	1	o	Gloria Malfatti	Italy	4:59.97	+22.64
11	4	o	Yelizaveta Prokhorenko	Kazakhstan	5:03.31	+25.98
12	2	o	Anne Michiels	Belgium	5:15.04	+37.71
13	3	i	Natalya Khramtsova	Belarus	5:24.97	+47.64
14	4	i	Altantulga Enkh-Ariun	Mongolia	5:25.40	+48.07
15	2	i	Anastasiya Kapustina	Belarus	5:29.23	+51.90
	3	o	Alina Dănescu	Romania	DSQ	
