= Speed skating at the 2012 Winter Youth Olympics – Boys' 3000 metres =

Boys' 3000 metres at the I Winter Youth Olympic Games
- Venue: Eisschnellaufbahn
- Date: January 18, 2012
- Competitors: 16 from 14 nations
- Winning time: 4:03.22

Medalists
1st place, gold medalist(s)		Yang Fan	China
2nd place, silver medalist(s)		Seitaro Ichinohe	Japan
3rd place, bronze medalist(s)		Noh Hyeok-jun	South Korea

The boys' 3000 metres speed skating competition of the Innsbruck 2012 Winter Youth Olympics was held at Eisschnellaufbahn on 18 January 2012.

== Results ==
The races were held at 12:19.

Rank	Pair	Lane	Name	Country	Time	Time Behind
1st place, gold medalist(s)	8	i	Yang Fan	China	4:03.22	
2nd place, silver medalist(s)	7	o	Seitaro Ichinohe	Japan	4:10.00	+6.78
3rd place, bronze medalist(s)	7	i	Noh Hyeok-jun	South Korea	4:14.41	+11.19
4	5	i	Peter Lenderink	Netherlands	4:14.93	+11.71
5	4	o	Nils van der Poel	Sweden	4:15.53	+12.31
6	5	o	Mikhail Kazelin	Russia	4:19.25	+16.03
7	8	o	Magnus Myhren Kristensen	Norway	4:19.71	+16.49
8	6	i	Bastijn Boele	Netherlands	4:21.02	+17.80
9	1	o	Dmitriy Morozov	Kazakhstan	4:22.42	+19.20
10	4	i	Manuel Vogl	Austria	4:27.27	+24.05
11	6	o	Arthur Iwaniszyn	Poland	4:30.06	+26.84
12	2	o	Maksim Dubovsky	Belarus	4:31.21	+27.99
13	1	i	Niklas Kamphausen	Germany	4:36.58	+33.36
14	3	i	Philip Due Schmidt	Denmark	4:39.71	+36.49
15	2	i	Tuomas Rahnasto	Finland	4:44.44	+41.22
16	3	o	Kenneth Stargardt	Germany	4:44.75	+41.53
