= Speed skating at the 2012 Winter Youth Olympics – Boys' mass start =

Boys' mass start at the I Winter Youth Olympic Games
- Venue: Eisschnellaufbahn
- Date: January 20, 2012
- Competitors: 26 from 16 nations
- Winning time: 7:10.23

Medalists
1st place, gold medalist(s)		Yang Fan	China
2nd place, silver medalist(s)		Seitaro Ichinohe	Japan
3rd place, bronze medalist(s)		Vasiliy Pudushkin	Russia

The boys' mass start speed skating competition of the Innsbruck 2012 Winter Youth Olympics was held at Eisschnellaufbahn on 20 January 2012.

== Results ==
The races were held at 11:23.

Rank	Name	Country	Time	Laps	Time Behind
1st place, gold medalist(s)	Yang Fan	China	7:10.23		
2nd place, silver medalist(s)	Seitaro Ichinohe	Japan	7:11.45		+1.22
3rd place, bronze medalist(s)	Vasiliy Pudushkin	Russia	7:12.83		+2.60
4	Toshihiro Kakui	Japan	7:13.10		+2.87
5	Stanislav Palkin	Kazakhstan	7:13.35		+3.12
6	Magnus Myhren Kristensen	Norway	7:14.15		+3.92
7	Mikhail Kazelin	Russia	7:14.42		+4.19
8	Manuel Vogl	Austria	7:14.51		+4.28
9	Nils van der Poel	Sweden	7:14.66		+4.43
10	Bastijn Boele	Netherlands	7:14.69		+4.46
11	Dmitriy Morozov	Kazakhstan	7:17.55		+7.32
12	Maksim Dubovsky	Belarus	7:19.41		+9.18
13	Thomas Petutschnigg	Austria	7:20.39		+10.16
14	Henrik Fagerli Rukke	Norway	7:20.50		+10.27
15	Arthur Iwaniszyn	Poland	7:24.81		+14.58
16	Noh Hyeok-jun	South Korea	7:26.72		+16.49
17	Philip Due Schmidt	Denmark	7:29.75		+19.52
18	Niklas Kamphausen	Germany	7:30.34		+20.11
19	Park Dai-han	South Korea	7:35.00		+24.77
20	Marcel Drwięga	Poland	7:51.71		+41.48
21	Peter Lenderink	Netherlands	8:21.82		+1:11.59
22	Liu An	China		10	
22	Kenneth Stargardt	Germany		10	
22	Matteo Cotza	Italy		10	
22	Cristian Adrian Mocanu	Romania		10	
26	Tuomas Rahnasto	Finland		3	
