= Speed skating at the 2012 Winter Youth Olympics – Girls' mass start =

Girls' mass start at the I Winter Youth Olympic Games
- Venue: Eisschnellaufbahn
- Date: January 20, 2012
- Competitors: 26 from 15 nations
- Winning time: 6:01.06

Medalists
1st place, gold medalist(s)		Sanneke de Neeling	Netherlands
2nd place, silver medalist(s)		Jang Su-ji	South Korea
3rd place, bronze medalist(s)		Sumire Kikuchi	Japan

The girls' mass start speed skating competition of the Innsbruck 2012 Winter Youth Olympics was held at Eisschnellaufbahn on 20 January 2012.

== Results ==
The races were held at 11:23.

Rank	Name	Country	Time	Laps	Time Behind
1st place, gold medalist(s)	Sanneke de Neeling	Netherlands	6:01.06		
2nd place, silver medalist(s)	Jang Su-ji	South Korea	6:01.13		+0.07
3rd place, bronze medalist(s)	Sumire Kikuchi	Japan	6:01.24		+0.18
4	Elizaveta Kazelina	Russia	6:01.47		+0.41
5	Michelle Uhrig	Germany	6:03.09		+2.03
6	Rio Harada	Japan	6:03.56		+2.50
7	Gloria Malfatti	Italy	6:03.91		+2.85
8	Leia Behlau	Germany	6:06.66		+5.60
9	Jang Mi	South Korea	6:07.44		+6.38
10	Marina Salnikova	Russia	6:07.63		+6.57
11	Shi Xiaoxuan	China	6:09.17		+8.11
12	Alina Dănescu	Romania	6:09.66		+8.60
13	Clare Jeong	United States	6:11.73		+10.67
14	Anne Michiels	Belgium	6:21.26		+20.20
15	Kaja Ziomek	Poland	6:21.46		+20.40
16	Aleksandra Kapruziak	Poland	6:22.03		+20.97
17	Yelizaveta Prokhorenko	Kazakhstan	6:23.20		+22.14
18	Bianca Stănică	Romania	6:26.07		+25.01
19	Anastasiya Kapustina	Belarus	6:26.11		+25.05
20	Altantulga Enkh-Ariun	Mongolia	6:38.07		+37.01
21	Laura De Candido	Italy		6	
22	Fu Yuan	China		5	
22	Martine Lilløy Bruun	Norway		5	
24	Inga Anne Vasaasen	Norway		4	
24	Svetlana Maltseva	Kazakhstan		5	
26	Suzanne Schulting	Netherlands		2	
