= Speed skating at the 2012 Winter Youth Olympics – Girls' 1500 metres =

Girls' 1500 metres at the I Winter Youth Olympic Games
- Venue: Eisschnellaufbahn
- Date: January 16, 2012
- Competitors: 16 from 10 nations
- Winning time: 2:08.17

Medalists
1st place, gold medalist(s)		Jang Mi	South Korea
2nd place, silver medalist(s)		Sanneke de Neeling	Netherlands
3rd place, bronze medalist(s)		Sumire Kikuchi	Japan

The girls' 1500 metres speed skating competition of the Innsbruck 2012 Winter Youth Olympics was held at Eisschnellaufbahn on 16 January 2012.

== Results ==
The races were held at 10:30.

Rank	Pair	Lane	Name	Country	Time	Time Behind
1st place, gold medalist(s)	5	i	Jang Mi	South Korea	2:08.17	
2nd place, silver medalist(s)	8	i	Sanneke de Neeling	Netherlands	2:09.54	+1.37
3rd place, bronze medalist(s)	7	o	Sumire Kikuchi	Japan	2:11.33	+3.16
4	6	i	Fu Yuan	China	2:11.94	+3.77
5	1	o	Elizaveta Kazelina	Russia	2:12.90	+4.73
6	6	o	Marina Salnikova	Russia	2:14.53	+6.36
7	8	o	Rio Harada	Japan	2:15.15	+6.98
8	5	o	Leia Behlau	Germany	2:15.75	+7.58
9	3	o	Shi Xiaoxuan	China	2:15.98	+7.81
10	2	i	Aleksandra Kapruziak	Poland	2:17.29	+9.12
11	4	o	Yelizaveta Prokhorenko	Kazakhstan	2:18.23	+10.06
12	4	i	Martine Lilløy Bruun	Norway	2:19.79	+11.62
13	3	i	Inga Anne Vasaasen	Norway	2:19.95	+11.78
14	1	i	Kaja Ziomek	Poland	2:23.23	+15.06
15	2	o	Alina Dănescu	Romania	2:23.40	+15.23
16	7	i	Suzanne Schulting	Netherlands	2:25.78	+17.61
