= Speed skating at the 2012 Winter Youth Olympics – Boys' 1500 metres =

Boys' 1500 metres at the I Winter Youth Olympic Games
- Venue: Eisschnellaufbahn
- Date: January 16, 2012
- Competitors: 16 from 11 nations
- Winning time: 1:54.20

Medalists
1st place, gold medalist(s)		Yang Fan	China
2nd place, silver medalist(s)		Liu An	China
3rd place, bronze medalist(s)		Seitaro Ichinohe	Japan

The boys' 1500 metres speed skating competition of the Innsbruck 2012 Winter Youth Olympics was held at Eisschnellaufbahn on 16 January 2012.

== Results ==
The races were held at 11:31.

Rank	Pair	Lane	Name	Country	Time	Time Behind
1st place, gold medalist(s)	7	o	Yang Fan	China	1:54.20	
2nd place, silver medalist(s)	5	o	Liu An	China	2:00.28	+6.08
3rd place, bronze medalist(s)	6	o	Seitaro Ichinohe	Japan	2:00.30	+6.10
4	1	o	Noh Hyeok-jun	South Korea	2:02.19	+7.99
5	4	i	Bastijn Boele	Netherlands	2:02.28	+8.08
6	8	o	Roman Dubovik	Belarus	2:02.47	+8.27
7	3	i	Nils van der Poel	Sweden	2:02.84	+8.64
8	7	i	Vasiliy Pudushkin	Russia	2:03.08	+8.88
9	6	i	Magnus Myhren Kristensen	Norway	2:03.27	+9.07
10	3	o	Mikhail Kazelin	Russia	2:03.42	+9.22
11	5	i	Peter Lenderink	Netherlands	2:04.04	+9.84
12	2	o	Toshihiro Kakui	Japan	2:05.02	+10.82
13	4	o	Manuel Vogl	Austria	2:05.32	+11.12
14	2	i	Henrik Fagerli Rukke	Norway	2:05.70	+11.50
15	8	i	Arthur Iwaniszyn	Poland	2:07.94	+13.74
16	1	i	Niklas Kamphausen	Germany	2:09.14	+14.94
