= Speed skating at the 2012 Winter Youth Olympics – Girls' 500 metres =

Girl's 500 metres at the I Winter Youth Olympic Games
- Venue: Eisschnellaufbahn
- Date: January 14, 2012
- Competitors: 16 from 14 nations
- Winning time: 81.68

Medalists
1st place, gold medalist(s)		Jang Mi	South Korea
2nd place, silver medalist(s)		Shi Xiaoxuan	China
3rd place, bronze medalist(s)		Martine Lilløy Bruun	Norway

The girl's 500 metres speed skating competition of the Innsbruck 2012 Winter Youth Olympics was held at Eisschnellaufbahn on 14 January 2012.

== Results ==
The races were held at 12:00.

Rank	Name	Country	Pair	Lane	Race 1	Rank	Pair	Lane	Race 2	Rank	Total	Time Behind
1st place, gold medalist(s)	Jang Mi	South Korea	6	o	40.88	1	8	i	40.80	1	81.68	
2nd place, silver medalist(s)	Shi Xiaoxuan	China	6	i	41.98	2	8	o	42.34	2	84.32	+2.64
3rd place, bronze medalist(s)	Martine Lilløy Bruun	Norway	7	i	43.98	4	7	o	43.53	4	87.51	+5.83
4	Suzanne Schulting	Netherlands	8	o	43.95	3	7	i	43.77	6	87.72	+6.04
5	Leia Behlau	Germany	5	o	44.36	5	6	i	43.77	6	88.13	+6.45
6	Svetlana Maltseva	Kazakhstan	4	i	44.53	6	6	o	43.65	5	88.18	+6.50
7	Gloria Malfatti	Italy	2	i	44.60	7	5	o	44.12	8	88.72	+7.04
8	Nikola Zdráhalová	Czech Republic	2	o	44.97	8	5	i	44.86	10	89.83	+8.15
9	Michelle Uhrig	Germany	7	o	45.16	9	4	i	44.94	11	90.12	+8.44
10	Anne Michiels	Belgium	1	o	45.27	10	3	i	45.68	14	90.95	+9.27
11	Laura De Candido	Italy	3	o	45.48	11	2	i	45.49	12	90.97	+9.29
12	Bianca Stănică	Romania	4	o	45.96	13	1	i	45.64	13	91.60	+9.92
13	Natalya Khramtsova	Belarus	8	i	45.60	12	4	o	46.40	15	92.00	+10.32
14	Altantulga Enkh-Ariun	Mongolia	1	i	47.12	14	3	o	47.63	16	94.75	+13.07
15	Marina Salnikova	Russia	5	i	82.07	15	2	o	43.35	3	125.42	+43.74
16	Kaja Ziomek	Poland	3	i	82.75	16	1	o	44.77	9	127.52	+45.84
