= Snowboarding at the 2012 Winter Youth Olympics – Boys' slopestyle =

Boys' slopestyle at the I Winter Youth Olympic Games
- Venue: Kühtai
- Date: 19 January
- Competitors: 25 from 18 nations
- Winning points: 94.25

Medalists
1st place, gold medalist(s)		Michael Ciccarelli	Canada
2nd place, silver medalist(s)		Ben Ferguson	United States
3rd place, bronze medalist(s)		David Hablützel	Switzerland

The boys' slopestyle competition of the snowboarding events at the 2012 Winter Youth Olympics in Innsbruck, Austria, was held January 19, at Kühtai. 28 athletes from 18 countries took part in this event.

== Results ==
=== Qualification ===
The qualification was started on 19 January at 09:00. The nine best snowboarders from each heat qualified for the final (QF).

Rank	Bib	Heat	Name	Country	Run 1	Run 2	Best	Notes
1	10	1	Michael Ciccarelli	Canada	86.50	90.75	90.75	QF
2	20	2	Ben Ferguson	United States	80.50	90.25	90.25	QF
3	22	2	Sebbe De Buck	Belgium	84.25	58.00	84.25	QF
4	19	2	Tyler Nicholson	Canada	55.75	82.75	82.75	QF
5	4	1	Max Raymer	United States	74.25	80.75	80.75	QF
6	6	1	Lucas Baume	Switzerland	79.75	29.25	79.75	QF
7	7	1	Tuomas Pohjonen	Finland	74.00	76.25	76.25	QF
8	17	2	David Hablützel	Switzerland	75.00	68.75	75.00	QF
9	27	2	Jan Kralj	Slovenia	73.75	51.00	73.75	QF
9	12	1	Ludvig Billtoft	Sweden	73.75	43.50	73.75	QF
11	2	1	Tim-Kevin Ravnjak	Slovenia	43.75	73.25	73.25	QF
12	26	2	Ondrej Porkert	Czech Republic	46.00	69.50	69.50	QF
13	11	1	Kalle Järvilehto	Finland	69.00	43.50	69.00	QF
14	25	2	Lewis Courtier-Jones	Great Britain	68.50	47.75	68.50	QF
15	18	2	Andre Escobar	Chile	43.75	66.75	66.75	QF
16	3	1	Georgi Mihaylov	Bulgaria	50.25	65.00	65.00	QF
17	5	1	Manex Azula	Spain	40.00	62.25	62.25	QF
18	21	2	Jesse Augustinus	Netherlands	38.50	61.25	61.25	QF
19	1	1	Johannes Höpfl	Germany	13.50	60.50	60.50	
20	13	1	Stef Van Deursen	Belgium	59.00	42.75	59.00	
21	24	2	Tim Herbert	New Zealand	44.50	57.00	57.00	
22	15	2	Philipp Kundratitz	Austria	46.50	41.75	46.50	
23	14	1	Florian Prietl	Austria	42.75	45.25	45.25	
24	8	1	Yannis Tourki	France	38.00	35.25	38.00	
25	9	1	Ivan Kardonov	Russia	33.75	34.50	34.50	
	16	2	Linus Birkendahl	Germany	Did not start			
	23	2	Hamish Bagley	New Zealand	Did not start			
	28	2	Victor Habermacher	France	Did not start			

=== Final ===
The final was started on 19 January at 12:30.

Rank	Bib	Name	Country	Run 1	Run 2	Best
1st place, gold medalist(s)	10	Michael Ciccarelli	Canada	85.75	94.25	94.25
2nd place, silver medalist(s)	20	Ben Ferguson	United States	90.25	87.50	90.25
3rd place, bronze medalist(s)	17	David Hablützel	Switzerland	57.75	87.50	87.50
4	27	Jan Kralj	Slovenia	58.50	85.25	85.25
5	4	Max Raymer	United States	39.25	85.00	85.00
6	19	Tyler Nicholson	Canada	44.25	84.00	84.00
7	7	Tuomas Pohjonen	Finland	80.25	46.50	80.25
8	26	Ondrej Porkert	Czech Republic	24.25	75.50	75.50
9	18	Andre Escobar	Chile	32.75	60.00	60.00
10	6	Lucas Baume	Switzerland	51.25	57.25	57.25
11	11	Kalle Järvilehto	Finland	32.00	56.00	56.00
12	12	Ludvig Billtoft	Sweden	44.75	55.50	55.50
13	3	Georgi Mihaylov	Bulgaria	47.50	48.25	48.25
14	22	Sebbe De Buck	Belgium	28.00	43.50	43.50
15	2	Tim-Kevin Ravnjak	Slovenia	41.75	41.75	41.75
16	25	Lewis Courtier-Jones	Great Britain	39.50	32.00	39.50
17	5	Manex Azula	Spain	29.00	33.50	33.50
18	21	Jesse Augustinus	Netherlands	24.00	28.25	28.25
