= Ice hockey at the 2012 Winter Youth Olympics – Boys' individual skills challenge =

Boys' individual skills challenge at the I Winter Youth Olympic Games
- Venue: Tyrolean Ice Arena
- Date: January 16 (qualification); January 19
- Competitors: 16 from 16 nations
- Winning points: 22

Medalists
1st place, gold medalist(s)		Augusts Vasiļonoks	Latvia
2nd place, silver medalist(s)		Attila Kovács	Hungary
3rd place, bronze medalist(s)		Seiya Furukawa	Japan

The boys' individual skills challenge at the 2012 Winter Youth Olympics was held between January 16 and 19, 2012 at Tyrolean Ice Arena in Innsbruck, Austria. Individual skills challenge based on six skills, with total points to determine final placements.

== Qualification ==
The eight highest ranked will qualify (Q) to the Grand Final.

Rk	Name	Nation	Fastest Lap		Shooting Accuracy		Skating Agility		Fastest Shot		Passing Precision		Puck Control		Total Pts	Notes
Rk	Name	Nation	Pt	Rk	Pt	Rk	Pt	Rk	Pt	Rk	Pt	Rk	Pt	Rk	Total Pts	Notes
1	Augusts Vasiļonoks	Latvia	7	2	7	7	2	7	8	1	8	1	8	1	35	Q
2	Seiya Furukawa	Japan	8	1	8	1	8	1	0	9	0	15	6	3	30	Q
3	Attila Kovács	Hungary	5	4	6	3	0	13	6	3	2	7	7	2	26	Q
4	Callum Burns	New Zealand	0	15	7	2	7	2	4	5	0	9	3	6	21	Q
5	Primož Čuvan	Slovenia	4	5	0	9	3	6	2	7	5	4	0	14	14	Q
6	Guus Simons	Netherlands	0	16	0	15	5	4	3	6	4	5	2	7	14	Q
7	Liu Qing	China	6	3	0	13	6	3	0	14	0	10	0	10	12	Q
8	Matija Miličić	Croatia	0	12	1	8	0	10	7	2	3	6	0	13	11	Q
9	Alexei Dashkevich	Belarus	0	11	5	4	0	15	0	15	6	3	0	11	11	
10	Cho Ji-hyun	South Korea	2	7	0	11	4	5	5	4	0	11	0	15	11	
11	Stefan Gaffal	Austria	0	13	0	10	0	16	0	12	7	2	1	8	8	
12	Lewis Hook	Great Britain	3	63	0	16	0	9	0	10	0	14	4	5	7	
13	Mihai Sotir	Romania	0	14	0	12	0	11	0	16	1	8	5	4	6	
14	Thibaut Colombin	France	0	9	4	5	1	8	0	11	0	13	0	12	5	
15	Sam Hodic	Australia	1	8	3	6	0	14	1	8	0	12	0	16	5	
16	Paul Cerdà	Spain	0	10	0	14	0	12	0	13	0	16	0	9	0	

== Grand Final ==
The players are ranked by total points. If still tied, by number of better skill rankings (number of ranks 1; if the same, number of ranks 2; if the same, number of ranks 3, etc.). If still tied, by overall seeding for the phase.

Rk	Name	Nation	Overall seeding	Fastest Lap		Shooting Accuracy		Skating Agility		Fastest Shot		Passing Precision		Puck Control		Total Pts
Rk	Name	Nation	Overall seeding	Pt	Rk	Pt	Rk	Pt	Rk	Pt	Rk	Pt	Rk	Pt	Rk	Total Pts
1st place, gold medalist(s)	Augusts Vasiļonoks	Latvia	1	4	2	3	3	4	2	5	1	2	7	5	2	22
2nd place, silver medalist(s)	Attila Kovács	Hungary	12	3	3	3	4	3	4	3	4	4	2	5	1	21
3rd place, bronze medalist(s)	Seiya Furukawa	Japan	3	5	1	4	2	2	8	2	6	3	4	3	3	19
4	Callum Burns	New Zealand	2	2	7	5	1	3	3	3	3	3	3	3	4	19
5	Primož Čuvan	Slovenia	14	2	6	2	7	5	1	2	7	5	1	2	6	18
6	Matija Miličić	Croatia	13	2	8	2	5	2	7	4	2	2	8	2	5	14
7	Liu Qing	China	11	3	4	2	8	2	6	2	8	2	6	2	8	13
8	Guus Simons	Netherlands	8	2	5	2	6	2	5	2	5	2	5	2	7	12
