= Belarus at the 2012 Winter Youth Olympics =

- IOC code: BLR
- NOC: Belarus Olympic Committee
- Website: www.noc.by

in Innsbruck
- Competitors: 16 in 8 sports
- Flag bearer: Anastasiya Lesik
- Medals Ranked 24th: Gold 0 Silver 1 Bronze 0 Total 1

Winter Youth Olympics appearances (overview)
- 2012; 2016; 2020; 2024

Belarus competed at the 2012 Winter Youth Olympics in Innsbruck, Austria. The Belarusian team consisted of 16 athletes in 7 sports.

== Medalists ==
Medals awarded to participants of mixed-NOC (combined) teams are represented in italics. These medals are not counted towards the individual NOC medal tally.

Medal	Name	Sport	Event	Date
Gold	Eugenia Tkachenka; Yuri Hulitski	Figure skating	Mixed NOC team	21 Jan
Silver	Roman Dubovik	Speed skating	Boys' 500m	14 Jan

== Alpine skiing ==
Belarus qualified one girl.

Girl

Athlete	Event	Final			
Athlete	Event	Run 1	Run 2	Total	Rank
Anastasiya Lesik	Slalom	47.56	44.63	1:32.19	17
Anastasiya Lesik	Giant slalom	DSQ			

== Biathlon ==
Belarus qualified a full team of two boys and girls.

Boy

Athlete	Event	Final		
Athlete	Event	Time	Misses	Rank
Viktar Kryuko	Sprint	20:53.0	2	13
Viktar Kryuko	Pursuit	DSQ		
Raman Malukha	Sprint	22:38.4	4	39
Raman Malukha	Pursuit	35:30.4	4	38

Girl

Athlete	Event	Final		
Athlete	Event	Time	Misses	Rank
Liudmila Kiaura	Sprint	20:02.4	2	26
Liudmila Kiaura	Pursuit	34:51.9	8	34
Tatsiana Tryfanava	Sprint	20:15.0	2	27
Tatsiana Tryfanava	Pursuit	33:58.7	9	26

Mixed

Athlete	Event	Final		
Athlete	Event	Time	Misses	Rank
Tatsiana Tryfanava; Liudmila Kiaura; Viktar Kryuko; Raman Malukha	Mixed relay	1:17:36.8	4+10	10
Liudmila Kiaura; Ina Lukonina; Viktar Kryuko; Maksim Hardzias	Cross-Country-Biathlon Mixed Relay	1:09:32.7	1+8	15

== Cross country skiing ==
Belarus qualified one boy and girl.

Boy

Athlete	Event	Final	
Athlete	Event	Time	Rank
Maksim Hardzias	10km classical	34:00.4	35

Girl

Athlete	Event	Final	
Athlete	Event	Time	Rank
Ina Lukonina	5km classical	16:48.8	23

Sprint

Athlete	Event	Qualification		Quarterfinal		Semifinal		Final	
Athlete	Event	Total	Rank	Total	Rank	Total	Rank	Total	Rank
Maksim Hardzias	Boys' sprint	1:47.28	16	1:50.2	5	did not advance			
Ina Lukonina	Girls' sprint	2:05.07	21 Q	2:05.9	4	did not advance			

Mixed

Athlete	Event	Final		
Athlete	Event	Time	Misses	Rank
Liudmila Kiaura; Ina Lukonina; Viktar Kryuko; Maksim Hardzias	Cross-Country-Biathlon Mixed Relay	1:09:32.7	1+8	15

== Figure skating ==
Belarus qualified an ice dance pair

Athlete	Event	SP/OD		FS/FD		Total	Rank
Athlete	Event	Points	Rank	Points	Rank	Total	Rank
Yuri Hulitski; Eugenia Tkachenka	Ice dancing	31.90	10	42.66	11	74.56	10

Mixed

Athletes	Event	Boys'			Girls'			Ice Dance			Total	
Athletes	Event	Score	Rank	Points	Score	Rank	Points	Score	Rank	Points	Points	Rank
Team 4 Shoma Uno (JPN); Jordan Bauth (USA); Eugenia Tkachenka/Yuri Hulitski (BLR)	Team Trophy	112.72	2	7	77.84	2	7	44.36	7	2	16	1st place, gold medalist(s)

== Ice hockey ==
Belarus boy one girl to compete in the skills challenge competition.

Boy

Athlete(s)	Event	Qualification		Grand final	
Athlete(s)	Event	Points	Rank	Points	Rank
Alexei Dashkevich	Individual skills	11	9	did not advance	

== Nordic combined ==
Belarus qualified one boy.

Boy

Athlete	Event	Ski jumping		Cross-country		Final	
Athlete	Event	Points	Rank	Deficit	Ski Time	Total Time	Rank
Nikita Maladsou	Boys' Individual	66.1	17	4:46	29:06.7	33:52.7	15

== Ski jumping ==
Belarus qualified one boy.

Boy

Athlete	Event	1st Jump		2nd Jump		Overall	
Athlete	Event	Distance	Points	Distance	Points	Points	Rank
Aliaksandr Mekhetka	Boys' individual	45.5m	46.5	46.5m	48.9	95.4	22

== Speed skating ==
Belarus qualified a full team of two boys and girls.

Boy

Athlete	Event	Race 1	Race 2	Total	Rank
Roman Dubovik	Boys' 500 m	38.87	38.95	77.82	2nd place, silver medalist(s)
Roman Dubovik	Boys' 1500 m			2:02.47	6
Maksim Dubovsky	Boys' 500 m	40.61	40.92	81.53	11
Maksim Dubovsky	Boys' 3000 m			4:31.21	12
Maksim Dubovsky	Boys' Mass Start			7:19.41	12

Girl

Athlete	Event	Race 1	Race 2	Total	Rank
Natalya Khramtsova	Girls' 500 m	45.61	46.39	92.00	13
Natalya Khramtsova	Girls' 3000 m			5:24.97	13
Anastasiya Kapustina	Girls' 3000 m			5:29.23	15
Anastasiya Kapustina	Girls' Mass Start			6:26.11	19

== See also ==
- Belarus at the 2012 Summer Olympics
