= Ski jumping at the 2012 Winter Youth Olympics – Boys' individual =

Boys' individual at the I Winter Youth Olympic Games
- Venue: Toni-Seelos-Olympiaschanze
- Dates: 14 January
- Competitors: 23 from 23 nations
- Winning points: 286.1

Medalists
1st place, gold medalist(s)		Anže Lanišek	Slovenia
2nd place, silver medalist(s)		Mats Søhagen Berggaard	Norway
3rd place, bronze medalist(s)		Yukiya Satō	Japan

The boys' individual competition of the ski jumping events at the 2012 Winter Youth Olympics in Innsbruck, Austria, was held on January 14, at the Toni-Seelos-Olympiaschanze. 23 athletes from 23 countries took part.

== Results ==
The first round was started on 14 January at 11:20 and the final round at 12:20.

Rank	Bib	Name	Country	Round 1			Final round			Total
Rank	Bib	Name	Country	Distance (m)	Points	Rank	Distance (m)	Points	Rank	Points
1st place, gold medalist(s)	22	Anže Lanišek	Slovenia	81.0	143.7	1	79.0	142.4	1	286.1
2nd place, silver medalist(s)	21	Mats Søhagen Berggaard	Norway	77.5	137.8	2	78.0	140.0	2	277.8
3rd place, bronze medalist(s)	5	Yukiya Satō	Japan	77.0	136.6	3	73.0	123.5	4	260.1
4	20	Andreas Wellinger	Germany	74.0	127.4	5	73.0	125.5	3	252.9
5	17	Miika Ylipulli	Finland	73.0	124.5	7	72.5	122.3	5	246.8
6	16	Tomáš Friedrich	Czech Republic	74.0	127.9	4	70.5	118.5	6	246.4
7	23	Elias Tollinger	Austria	74.0	127.4	5	71.0	118.2	7	245.6
8	4	Dusty Korek	Canada	72.5	123.8	8	70.5	117.0	8	240.8
9	18	Killian Peier	Switzerland	71.5	119.9	9	70.5	117.0	8	236.9
10	6	Daniele Varesco	Italy	67.5	107.8	10	67.0	108.1	11	215.9
11	13	Oldrik van der Aalst	Netherlands	65.5	103.0	14	68.5	112.2	10	215.2
12	10	Serhiy Drozdov	Ukraine	69.5	107.6	11	68.0	107.0	12	214.6
13	11	Rauno Loit	Estonia	65.5	103.5	13	65.5	103.5	14	207.0
14	7	Krysztof Leja	Poland	64.5	101.1	15	66.0	105.2	13	206.3
15	19	Arthur Royer	France	66.5	105.9	12	61.5	93.9	18	199.8
16	14	Faik Yüksel	Turkey	64.5	100.6	16	62.5	95.3	16	195.9
17	3	Robert Tatu	Romania	62.5	95.8	18	62.0	92.1	19	187.9
18	8	Yury Samsonov	Russia	63.5	96.7	17	60.5	90.0	20	186.7
19	2	William Rhoads	United States	59.0	86.4	20	63.0	95.0	17	181.4
20	1	Ákos Szilágyi	Hungary	60.5	90.0	19	60.0	87.8	21	177.8
21	15	Deyan Funtarov	Bulgaria	52.5	63.3	21	66.0	103.2	15	166.5
22	12	Aliaksandr Mekhetka	Belarus	45.5	46.5	22	46.5	48.9	22	95.4
23	9	Kanat Khamitov	Kazakhstan	44.0	40.9	23	39.5	31.6	23	72.5
