= Bobsleigh at the 2012 Winter Youth Olympics – Two-girls =

Two-girls at the I Winter Youth Olympic Games
- Venue: Olympic Sliding Centre Innsbruck
- Date: January 22
- Competitors: 16 from 6 nations
- Winning time: 1:51.62

Medalists
1st place, gold medalist(s)		Marije van Huigenbosch; Sanne Dekker	Netherlands
2nd place, silver medalist(s)		Mica McNeill; Jazmin Sawyers	Great Britain
3rd place, bronze medalist(s)		Kimberley Bos; Mandy Groot	Netherlands

The Two-girls competition of the bobsleigh events at the 2012 Winter Youth Olympics in Innsbruck, Austria, was held on January 22, at the Olympic Sliding Centre Innsbruck. 16 athletes from 6 countries took part in this event.

== Results ==
The runs was started at 11:00.

Rank	Bib	Country	Athletes	Run 1	Run 2	Total	Behind
1st place, gold medalist(s)	4	Netherlands	Marije van Huigenbosch; Sanne Dekker	55.58	56.04	1:51.62	–
2nd place, silver medalist(s)	6	Great Britain	Mica McNeill; Jazmin Sawyers	55.66	56.29	1:51.95	+0.33
3rd place, bronze medalist(s)	5	Netherlands	Kimberley Bos; Mandy Groot	56.20	55.95	1:52.15	+0.53
4	7	Great Britain	Kirsten Emery; Frances Slater	55.92	56.42	1:52.34	+0.72
5	1	Italy	Mathilde Parodi; Valentina Margaglio	56.26	56.15	1:52.41	+0.79
6	2	Romania	Ana Constantin; Andreea Grecu	56.52	56.42	1:52.94	+1.32
7	3	Canada	Mercedes Miller; Casey Froese	57.29	57.29	1:54.58	+2.96
8	8	Japan	Maria Oshigiri; Shizuka Uehara	57.60	57.55	1:55.15	+3.53
