= Figure skating at the 2012 Winter Youth Olympics – Girls' singles =

Girls' singles at the I Winter Youth Olympic Games
- Venue: Olympiahalle
- Dates: January 15; January 17
- Competitors: 16 from 15 nations

Medalists
1st place, gold medalist(s)		Elizaveta Tuktamysheva	Russia
2nd place, silver medalist(s)		Adelina Sotnikova	Russia
3rd place, bronze medalist(s)		Li Zijun	China

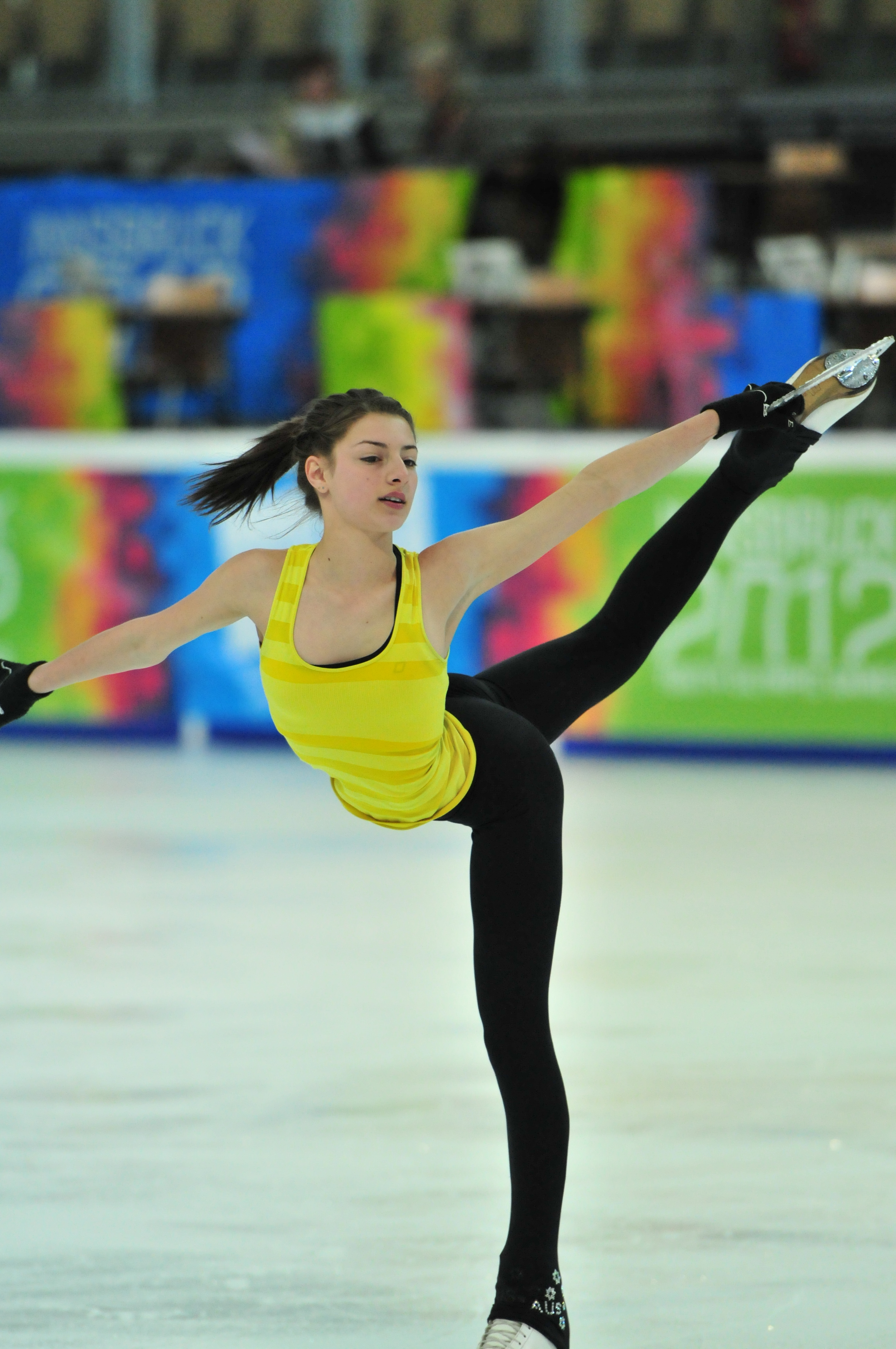

The girls' single skating competition of the 2012 Winter Youth Olympics was held at the Olympiahalle in Innsbruck on January 15 (short program) and January 17 (free skating), 2012.

== Results ==
=== Short program results ===
Pl.	Name	Nation	TSS	TES	PCS	SS	TR	PE	CH	IN	Ded	StN
1	Elizaveta Tuktamysheva	Russia	61.83	34.42	27.41	6.82	6.32	7.11	6.93	7.07	0.00	10
2	Adelina Sotnikova	Russia	59.44	32.66	26.78	6.82	6.36	6.82	6.75	6.71	0.00	7
3	Zijun Li	China	50.92	27.58	23.34	5.96	5.57	5.93	5.96	5.75	0.00	5
4	Anais Ventard	France	49.85	27.37	22.48	5.39	5.21	5.68	5.86	5.96	0.00	13
5	Park So-youn	South Korea	48.37	25.30	23.07	5.79	5.54	5.86	5.86	5.79	0.00	14
6	Risa Shoji	Japan	47.29	23.26	24.03	6.07	5.71	6.07	6.18	6.00	0.00	11
7	Jordan Bauth	United States	42.33	22.47	19.86	5.04	4.71	4.96	5.04	5.07	0.00	3
8	Tina Stürzinger	Switzerland	40.63	22.63	18.00	4.71	4.29	4.50	4.61	4.39	0.00	15
9	Micol Cristini	Italy	39.87	21.75	18.12	4.96	4.32	4.50	4.54	4.32	0.00	2
10	Darin Khussein	Ukraine	39.77	22.75	17.02	4.50	3.93	4.39	4.29	4.18	0.00	1
11	Chantelle Kerry	Australia	37.51	20.12	17.39	4.43	4.00	4.39	4.43	4.50	0.00	8
12	Nina Larissa Wolfslast	Austria	34.45	19.08	15.37	3.93	3.50	3.96	4.00	3.82	0.00	12
13	Sindra Kriisa	Estonia	34.43	16.69	17.74	4.46	4.25	4.50	4.46	4.50	0.00	9
14	Myrtel Saldeen Olofsson	Sweden	33.57	17.03	16.54	4.32	3.96	4.18	4.18	4.04	0.00	16
15	Lilo Swerts	Belgium	30.73	16.75	14.98	3.82	3.50	3.79	3.82	3.79	1.00	6
16	Eveliina Viljanen	Finland	29.73	13.04	18.69	4.93	4.61	4.32	4.82	4.68	2.00	4

=== Free program results ===
Pl.	Name	Nation	TSS	TES	PCS	SS	TR	PE	CH	IN	Ded	StN
1	Elizaveta Tuktamysheva	Russia	111.27	57.47	54.80	7.04	6.46	6.89	6.93	6.93	1.00	11
2	Zijun Li	China	106.78	57.59	49.19	6.32	5.79	6.32	6.25	6.07	0.00	12
3	Adelina Sotnikova	Russia	99.64	46.72	52.92	6.82	6.46	6.36	6.75	6.68	0.00	16
4	Park So-youn	South Korea	88.23	44.79	44.44	5.89	5.25	5.64	5.54	5.46	1.00	15
5	Risa Shoji	Japan	88.03	42.40	46.63	5.96	5.68	5.64	6.00	5.86	1.00	14
6	Anais Ventard	France	86.23	41.45	45.78	5.61	5.43	5.57	6.04	5.96	1.00	13
7	Jordan Bauth	United States	81.06	39.87	41.19	5.32	4.86	5.29	5.14	5.14	0.00	9
8	Tina Stürzinger	Switzerland	72.92	36.39	36.53	4.86	4.32	4.54	4.68	4.43	0.00	6
9	Chantelle Kerry	Australia	71.84	35.94	35.54	4.46	4.18	4.50	4.50	4.57	0.00	7
10	Eveliina Viljanen	Finland	71.37	36.00	36.37	4.93	4.11	4.61	4.54	4.54	1.00	2
11	Darin Khussein	Ukraine	69.54	34.37	35.17	4.68	4.04	4.54	4.36	4.36	0.00	10
12	Micol Cristini	Italy	65.57	31.10	35.47	4.89	4.21	4.25	4.57	4.25	1.00	8
13	Nina Larissa Wolfslast	Austria	61.81	31.26	30.55	3.89	3.64	3.82	3.89	3.86	0.00	4
14	Myrtel Saldeen Olofsson	Sweden	58.97	28.80	32.17	4.29	3.96	3.93	4.04	3.89	2.00	5
15	Sindra Kriisa	Estonia	58.00	26.47	32.53	4.21	3.79	4.04	4.18	4.11	1.00	1
16	Lilo Swerts	Belgium	54.84	26.81	29.03	3.71	3.32	3.68	3.82	3.61	1.00	3

=== Overall Results ===
Pl.	Name	Nation	Total points	SP	FS
1	Elizaveta Tuktamysheva	Russia	173.10	1	1
2	Adelina Sotnikova	Russia	159.08	2	3
3	Li Zijun	China	157.70	3	2
4	Park So-youn	South Korea	136.60	5	4
5	Anais Ventard	France	136.08	4	6
6	Risa Shoji	Japan	135.32	6	5
7	Jordan Bauth	United States	123.39	7	7
8	Tina Stürzinger	Switzerland	113.55	8	8
9	Darin Khussein	Ukraine	109.31	10	11
10	Chantelle Kerry	Australia	108.99	11	9
11	Micol Cristini	Italy	105.44	9	12
12	Eveliina Viljanen	Finland	101.10	16	10
13	Nina Larissa Wolfslast	Austria	96.26	12	13
14	Myrtel Saldeen Olofsson	Sweden	92.54	14	14
15	Sindra Kriisa	Estonia	92.43	13	15
16	Lilo Swerts	Belgium	85.57	15	16
