= Alpine skiing at the 2012 Winter Youth Olympics – Boys' slalom =

Boys' slalom at the I Winter Youth Olympic Games
- Venue: Patscherkofel
- Date: January 21
- Competitors: 62 from 54 nations
- Winning time: 1:18.36

Medalists
1st place, gold medalist(s)		Marco Schwarz	Austria
2nd place, silver medalist(s)		Dries Van den Broecke	Belgium
3rd place, bronze medalist(s)		Mathias Elmar Graf	Austria

The boys' slalom competition of the alpine skiing events at the 2012 Winter Youth Olympics in Innsbruck, Austria, was held on January 21, at the Patscherkofel. 62 athletes from 54 different countries took part in this event.

== Results ==
Rank	Bib	Name	Country	Run 1	Run 2	Total	Difference
1st place, gold medalist(s)	6	Sandro Simonet	Switzerland	38.62	39.74	1:18.36	
2nd place, silver medalist(s)	8	Dries Van den Broecke	Belgium	39.80	40.46	1:20.26	+1.90
3rd place, bronze medalist(s)	18	Mathias Elmar Graf	Austria	40.16	40.19	1:20.35	+1.99
4	2	Davide Da Villa	Italy	39.97	40.52	1:20.49	+2.13
5	14	Štefan Hadalin	Slovenia	41.01	39.72	1:20.73	+2.37
6	10	Nikolaus Ertl	Germany	40.68	40.44	1:21.12	+2.76
7	16	Lucas Krahnert	Germany	40.53	40.74	1:21.27	+2.91
8	24	Joan Verdú Sánchez	Andorra	41.27	40.06	1:21.33	+2.97
9	23	Istok Rodeš	Croatia	41.15	40.84	1:21.99	+3.63
10	22	Martin Grasic	Canada	41.57	40.75	1:22.32	+3.96
11	25	Fredrik Bauer	Sweden	42.85	40.09	1:22.94	+4.58
12	27	Juho Sattanen	Finland	41.75	41.38	1:23.13	+4.77
13	26	Miks Zvejnieks	Latvia	43.35	39.83	1:23.18	+ 4.82
14	37	Tõnis Luik	Estonia	42.45	40.97	1:23.42	+5.06
15	28	Victor Schuller	France	43.21	40.52	1:23.73	+5.37
16	20	Georgi Nushev	Bulgaria	42.13	42.01	1:24.14	+5.78
17	34	Harry Laidlaw	Australia	43.26	41.30	1:24.56	+6.20
18	35	Massimiliano Valcareggi	Greece	42.65	42.19	1:24.84	+6.48
19	30	Martin Štěpán	Czech Republic	44.12	40.86	1:24.98	+6.62
20	29	Artem Pak	Russia	44.70	41.31	1:26.01	+7.65
21	40	Márton Kékesi	Hungary	44.57	41.99	1:26.56	+8.20
22	39	Manuel Hug	Liechtenstein	42.94	45.04	1:27.98	+9.62
23	42	Harry Izard-Price	New Zealand	46.12	43.05	1:29.17	+10.81
24	60	Rokas Zaveckas	Lithuania	46.05	43.24	1:29.29	+10.93
25	4	Seiya Hiroshima	Japan	47.64	42.68	1:30.32	+11.96
26	45	Dmytro Mytsak	Ukraine	46.30	44.34	1:30.64	+12.28
27	50	Mihai Andrei Centiu	Romania	46.61	46.82	1:33.43	+15.07
28	52	Alexandre Mohbat	Lebanon	48.53	45.88	1:34.41	+16.05
29	56	Mustafa Topaloğlu	Turkey	48.34	48.87	1:37.21	+18.85
30	61	Nima Baha	Iran	49.04	48.76	1:37.80	+19.44
31	53	Arkadiy Semenchenko	Uzbekistan	54.44	49.94	1:44.38	+26.02
32	62	Sive Speelman	South Africa	53.13	52.04	1:45.17	+26.81
33	55	Tobias Macedo	Brazil	56.45	49.14	1:45.59	+27.23
34	48	Dinos Lefkaritis	Cyprus	1:02.83	47.62	1:50.45	+32.09
35	58	Wu Meng-che	Chinese Taipei	1:14.46	1:11.01	2:25.47	+ 1:07.11
	11	Kim Dong-woo	South Korea	41.85	DNF		
	13	Marcus Monsen	Norway	40.44	DNF		
	15	Alex Leever	United States	40.44	DNF		
	17	Adam Lamhamedi	Morocco	48.14	DNF		
	19	Ian Gut	Switzerland	46.96	DNF		
	38	Sebastian Echeverría	Chile	43.52	DNF		
	41	Nikoloz Kozanashvili	Georgia	43.25	DNF		
	43	Shannon-Ogbnai Abeda	Eritrea	46.14	DNF		
	44	Ruslan Sabitov	Kazakhstan	45.55	DNF		
	46	Marjan Nashoku	Macedonia	45.99	DNF		
	47	Marko Šljivić	Bosnia and Herzegovina	47.38	DNF		
	49	Frederik Munck Bigom	Denmark	47.45	DNF		
	51	Bryan Pelassy	Monaco	48.19	DNF		
	54	Abel Tesfamariam	Philippines	52.02	DNF		
	57	Vincenzo Michelotti	San Marino	48.67	DNF		
	1	Leny Herpin	France	DNF			
	3	Martin Fjeldberg	Norway	DNF			
	5	Miha Hrobat	Slovenia	DNF			
	9	Hannes Zingerle	Italy	DNF			
	12	Marco Schwarz	Austria	DNF			
	21	Andrzej Dziedzic	Poland	DNF			
	31	Paul Henderson	Great Britain	DNF			
	32	Adria Bertran	Spain	DNF			
	36	Lambert Quezel	Canada	DNF			
	59	Bibash Lama	Nepal	DNF			
	7	Jakob Helgi Bjarnason	Iceland	DSQ			
	33	Strahinja Stanišić	Serbia	DSQ			
