= Norway at the 2012 Winter Youth Olympics =

- IOC code: NOR
- NOC: Norwegian Olympic Committee
- Website: www.idrett.no

in Innsbruck
- Competitors: 28 in 9 sports
- Flag bearer: Ina Roll Backe
- Medals Ranked 9th: Gold 2 Silver 5 Bronze 2 Total 9

Winter Youth Olympics appearances
- 2012; 2016; 2020; 2024

Norway competed at the 2012 Winter Youth Olympics in Innsbruck, Austria.

== Medalists ==
Medal	Name	Sport	Event	Date
Gold	Andreas Molden	Cross-country Skiing	Boys' Sprint	19 Jan
Gold	Silje Theodorsen	Cross-country Skiing	Girls' Sprint	19 Jan
Silver	Nora Grieg Christensen	Alpine skiing	Girls' super-G	14 Jan
Silver	Mats Berggaard	Ski jumping	Boys' individual	14 Jan
Silver	Tiril Sjaastad Christiansen	Freestyle skiing	Girls' halfpipe	15 Jan
Silver	Nora Grieg Christensen; Martin Fjeldberg; Mina Fürst Holtmann; Marcus Monsen	Alpine skiing	Parallel mixed team	17 Jan
Silver	Kristin Sandeggen; Karoline Næss; Haakon Livik; Kristian Andre Aalerud	Biathlon	Mixed Relay	19 Jan
Bronze	Martine Lilløy Bruun	Speed skating	Girls' 500m	14 Jan
Bronze	Linn Eriksen	Cross-country Skiing	Girls' Sprint	19 Jan

== Alpine skiing ==
Norway qualified 4 athletes.

Boys

Athlete	Event	Final			
Athlete	Event	Run 1	Run 2	Total	Rank
Martin Fjeldberg	Slalom	DNF			
Martin Fjeldberg	Giant slalom	57.62	55.27	1:52.89	4
Martin Fjeldberg	Super-G			DNF	
Martin Fjeldberg	Combined	1:03.44	DNF		
Marcus Monsen	Slalom	40.44	DNF		
Marcus Monsen	Giant slalom	58.30	55.03	1:53.33	5
Marcus Monsen	Super-G			1:04.97	6
Marcus Monsen	Combined	1:04.19	38.02	1:42.21	4

Girls

Athlete	Event	Final			
Athlete	Event	Run 1	Run 2	Total	Rank
Nora Grieg Christensen	Slalom	43.08	DNF		
Nora Grieg Christensen	Giant slalom	DNF			
Nora Grieg Christensen	Super-G			1:05.79	2nd place, silver medalist(s)
Nora Grieg Christensen	Combined	1:05.54	DNF		
Mina Fürst Holtmann	Super-G			DNF	

Team

Athlete	Event	Quarterfinals	Semifinals	Final	Rank
Nora Grieg Christensen; Martin Fjeldberg; Mina Fürst Holtmann; Marcus Monsen	Parallel mixed team	Switzerland; W 2-1	Italy; W 2-2	Austria; L 1-3	2nd place, silver medalist(s)

== Biathlon ==
Norway qualified 4 athletes.

Boys

Athlete	Event	Final		
Athlete	Event	Time	Misses	Rank
Kristian Andre Aalerud	Sprint	20:04.4	2	5
Kristian Andre Aalerud	Pursuit	30.04.7	7	6
Haakon Livik	Sprint	20:34.1	1	9
Haakon Livik	Pursuit	30:26.9	4	9

Girls

Athlete	Event	Final		
Athlete	Event	Time	Misses	Rank
Karoline Næss	Sprint	21:10.6	5	36
Karoline Næss	Pursuit	35:07.7	8	35
Kristin Sandeggen	Sprint	18:55.5	1	11
Kristin Sandeggen	Pursuit	30:55.3	4	12

Mixed

Athlete	Event	Final		
Athlete	Event	Time	Misses	Rank
Kristin Sandeggen; Karoline Næss; Haakon Livik; Kristian Andre Aalerud	Mixed relay	1:13:11.7	0+8	2nd place, silver medalist(s)
Kristin Sandeggen; Silje Theodorsen; Kristian Andre Aalerud; Chrisander Skjønberg Holth	Cross-Country-Biathlon Mixed Relay	1:06:46.2	3+6	9

== Cross-country skiing ==
Norway qualified 4 athletes.

Boys

Athlete	Event	Final	
Athlete	Event	Time	Rank
Chrisander Skjønberg Holth	10km classical	30:14.1	4
Andreas Molden	10km classical	31:16.3	13

Girls

Athlete	Event	Final	
Athlete	Event	Time	Rank
Linn Eriksen	5km classical	16:03.3	11
Silje Theodorsen	5km classical	15:05.6	4

Sprint

Athlete	Event	Qualification		Quarterfinal		Semifinal		Final	
Athlete	Event	Total	Rank	Total	Rank	Total	Rank	Total	Rank
Chrisander Skjønberg Holth	Boys' sprint	1:43.60	3 Q	1:46.1	3 Q	1:48.6	4	did not advance	
Andreas Molden	Boys' sprint	1:42.08	1 Q	1:46.3	1 Q	1:46.0	1 Q	1:44.1	1st place, gold medalist(s)
Linn Eriksen	Girls' sprint	1:56.94	3 Q	2:01.6	2 Q	1:59.3	3 Q	1:57.6	3rd place, bronze medalist(s)
Silje Theodorsen	Girls' sprint	1:55.10	1 Q	1:58.9	1 Q	1:57.2	1 Q	1:57.4	1st place, gold medalist(s)

Mixed

Athlete	Event	Final		
Athlete	Event	Time	Misses	Rank
Kristin Sandeggen; Silje Theodorsen; Kristian Andre Aalerud; Chrisander Skjønberg Holth	Cross-Country-Biathlon Mixed Relay	1:06:46.2	3+6	9

== Curling ==
Norway qualified a team.

Roster

- Fourth: Martin Sesaker
- Third: Stine Haalien
- Skip: Markus Furulund Skogvold
- Lead: Ina Roll Backe

=== Mixed team ===
Final Round Robin Standings

Blue Group	Skip	W	L
United States	Korey Dropkin	7	0
Switzerland	Michael Brunner	6	1
Czech Republic	Marek Černovský	4	3
China	Bai Yang	3	4
Norway	Markus Skogvold	3	4
South Korea	Kang Sue-yeon	2	5
New Zealand	Luke Steele	2	5
Estonia	Robert-Kent Päll	1	6

Round Robin

Draw 1

Sheet D	1	2	3	4	5	6	7	8	9	Final
China (Bai)	0	0	0	0	2	0	1	1	0	4
Norway (Skogvold) 🔨	1	1	0	0	0	2	0	0	1	5

Draw 2

Sheet C	1	2	3	4	5	6	7	8	Final
Norway (Skogvold)	0	0	2	0	0	0	X	X	2
Switzerland (Brunner) 🔨	2	1	0	3	1	1	X	X	8

Draw 3

Sheet B	1	2	3	4	5	6	7	8	Final
Norway (Skogvold)	3	0	1	0	0	0	1	0	5
Czech Republic (Černovský) 🔨	0	2	0	0	1	2	0	3	8

Draw 4

Sheet A	1	2	3	4	5	6	7	8	Final
Norway (Skogvold)	0	0	1	1	0	0	1	0	3
South Korea (Kang) 🔨	2	1	0	0	0	1	0	3	7

Draw 5

Sheet C	1	2	3	4	5	6	7	8	Final
New Zealand (Steele) 🔨	1	0	2	0	0	2	1	0	6
Norway (Skogvold)	0	2	0	2	2	0	0	1	7

Draw 6

Sheet D	1	2	3	4	5	6	7	8	Final
Norway (Skogvold) 🔨	1	0	1	0	1	0	0	X	3
United States (Dropkin)	0	2	0	2	0	1	1	X	6

Draw 7

Sheet B	1	2	3	4	5	6	7	8	Final
Estonia (Päll)	2	0	1	0	0	0	X	X	3
Norway (Skogvold) 🔨	0	1	0	2	2	3	X	X	8

Tiebreaker

Sheet D	1	2	3	4	5	6	7	8	9	Final
China (Bai)	1	0	1	0	0	1	0	X	X	3
Norway (Skogvold) 🔨	0	2	0	3	0	0	1	X	X	6

Quarterfinals

Sheet C	1	2	3	4	5	6	7	8	Final
Sweden (Wranå) 🔨	0	0	0	2	2	1	3	X	8
Norway (Skogvold)	0	0	0	0	0	0	0	X	0

=== Mixed doubles ===
Round of 32

Sheet B	1	2	3	4	5	6	7	8	Final
Wang Jinbo (CHN); Ina Roll Backe (NOR) 🔨	2	2	0	1	0	2	0	1	8
Camilla Schnabel (AUT); Jordan Wåhlin (SWE)	0	0	2	0	3	0	2	0	7

Sheet B	1	2	3	4	5	6	7	8	Final
Angharad Ward (GBR); Markus Skogvold (NOR) 🔨	3	1	0	1	0	3	0	0	8
Luke Steele (NZL); Johanna Heldin (SWE)	0	0	3	0	1	0	4	1	9

Sheet B	1	2	3	4	5	6	7	8	Final
Martin Sesaker (NOR); Kim Eun-bi (KOR)	1	0	4	0	2	2	0	X	9
Amalia Rudström (SWE); Kevin Lehmann (GER) 🔨	0	1	0	1	0	0	1	X	3

Sheet B	1	2	3	4	5	6	7	8	Final
Stine Haalien (NOR); Alexandr Korshunov (RUS) 🔨	0	0	0	0	1	0	0	X	1
Rasmus Wranå (SWE); Kerli Zirk (EST)	1	3	1	1	0	1	1	X	8

Round of 16

Sheet D	1	2	3	4	5	6	7	8	Final
Yang Ying (CHN); Thomas Howell (USA)	0	3	0	0	0	1	0	X	4
Martin Sesaker (NOR); Kim Eun-bi (KOR) 🔨	2	0	2	1	2	0	3	X	10

Sheet C	1	2	3	4	5	6	7	8	Final
Michael Brunner (SUI); Nicole Muskatewitz (GER) 🔨	1	1	1	1	1	0	1	X	6
Wang Jinbo (CHN); Ina Roll Backe (NOR)	0	0	0	0	0	1	0	X	1

Quarterfinals

Sheet A	1	2	3	4	5	6	7	8	9	Final
Martin Sesaker (NOR); Kim Eun-bi (KOR) 🔨	0	3	0	1	0	0	1	1	1	7
Anastasia Moskaleva (RUS); Tsukasa Horigome (JPN)	1	0	2	0	1	2	0	0	0	6

Semifinals

Sheet D	1	2	3	4	5	6	7	8	Final
Martin Sesaker (NOR); Kim Eun-bi (KOR) 🔨	0	5	0	2	0	2	1	3	13
Yoo Min-hyeon (KOR); Mako Tamakuma (JPN)	2	0	1	0	3	0	0	0	6

Gold Medal Game

Sheet C	1	2	3	4	5	6	7	8	Final
Michael Brunner (SUI); Nicole Muskatewitz (GER) 🔨	3	2	0	4	0	4	X	X	13
Martin Sesaker (NOR); Kim Eun-bi (KOR)	0	0	1	0	1	0	X	X	2

== Freestyle skiing ==
Norway qualified 3 athletes.

Ski Cross

Athlete	Event	Qualifying		1/4 finals	Semifinals	Final
Athlete	Event	Time	Rank	Rank	Rank	Rank
Marius Boe Vangsnes	Boys' ski cross	57.73	5	Cancelled		

Ski Half-Pipe

Athlete	Event	Qualifying		Final	
Athlete	Event	Points	Rank	Points	Rank
Johan Berg	Boys' ski half-pipe	70.00	6 Q	71.75	7
Tiril Sjaastad Christiansen	Girls' ski half-pipe	76.75	3 Q	79.25	2nd place, silver medalist(s)

== Luge ==
Norway qualified 2 athletes.

Girls

Athlete	Event	Final			
Athlete	Event	Run 1	Run 2	Total	Rank
Karoline Frimo Melas	Girls' singles	41.604	41.240	1:22.844	18
Gry Martine Mostue	Girls' singles	40.757	40.760	1:21.517	8

== Nordic combined ==
Norway qualified 1 athlete.

Boys

Athlete	Event	Ski jumping		Cross-country		Final	
Athlete	Event	Points	Rank	Deficit	Ski Time	Total Time	Rank
Harald Johnas Riiber	Boys' individual	131.3	3	0:25	27:05.0	27:30.0	6

== Ski jumping ==
Norway qualified 2 athletes.

Boys

Athlete	Event	1st Jump		2nd Jump		Overall	
Athlete	Event	Distance	Points	Distance	Points	Points	Rank
Mats Berggaard	Boys' individual	77.5m	137.8	78.0m	140.0	277.8	2nd place, silver medalist(s)

Girls

Athlete	Event	1st Jump		2nd Jump		Overall	
Athlete	Event	Distance	Points	Distance	Points	Points	Rank
Karoline Roestad	Girls' individual	63.5m	96.7	62.0m	93.1	189.8	8

Team w/Nordic Combined

Athlete	Event	1st Round	2nd Round	Total	Rank
Karoline Roestad; Harald Johnas Riiber; Mats Berggaard	Mixed Team	271.2	301.2	572.4	6

== Speed skating ==
Norway qualified 4 athletes.

Boys

Athlete	Event	Race 1	Race 2	Total	Rank
Henrik Fagerli Rukke	Boys' 500 m	40.27	40.37	80.64	9
Henrik Fagerli Rukke	Boys' 1500 m			2:05.70	14
Henrik Fagerli Rukke	Boys' Mass Start			7:20.50	14
Magnus Myhren Kristensen	Boys' 1500 m			2:03.27	9
Magnus Myhren Kristensen	Boys' 3000 m			4:19.71	7
Magnus Myhren Kristensen	Boys' Mass Start			7:14.15	6

Girls

Athlete	Event	Race 1	Race 2	Total	Rank
Martine Lilløy Bruun	Girls' 500 m	43.98	43.53	87.51	3rd place, bronze medalist(s)
Martine Lilløy Bruun	Girls' 1500 m			2:19.79	12
Martine Lilløy Bruun	Girls' Mass Start			LAP	
Inga Anne Vasaasen	Girls' 1500 m			2:19.95	13
Inga Anne Vasaasen	Girls' 3000 m			4:55.71	9
Inga Anne Vasaasen	Girls' Mass Start			LAP	

== See also ==
- Norway at the 2012 Summer Olympics
