= Netherlands at the 2012 Winter Youth Olympics =

- IOC code: NED
- NOC: NOC*NSF
- Website: www.nocnsf.nl

in Innsbruck
- Competitors: 18 in 8 sports
- Flag bearer: Oldrik van der Aalst
- Medals Ranked 6th: Gold 4 Silver 1 Bronze 2 Total 7

Winter Youth Olympics appearances
- 2012; 2016; 2020; 2024

The Netherlands competed at the 2012 Winter Youth Olympics in Innsbruck, Austria.

== Medalists ==
Medal	Name	Sport	Event	Date
Gold	Sanneke de Neeling	Speed Skating	Girls' 3000m	18 Jan
Gold	Julie Zwarthoed	Ice Hockey	Girls' individual skills challenge	19 Jan
Gold	Sanneke de Neeling	Speed Skating	Girls' Mass Start	20 Jan
Gold	Marije van Huigenbosch; Sanne Dekker	Bobsleigh	Two-girls	22 Jan
Silver	Sanneke de Neeling	Speed Skating	Girls' 1500m	16 Jan
Bronze	Adriana Jelinkova	Alpine Skiing	Girls' combined	15 Jan
Bronze	Kimberley Bos; Mandy Groot	Bobsleigh	Two-girls	22 Jan

== Alpine skiing ==
Netherlands qualified 2 athletes.

While formally listed on the team Valentijn van der Avoort was not listed to compete in any events.

Girls

Athlete	Event	Final			
Athlete	Event	Run 1	Run 2	Total	Rank
Adriana Jelkinkova	Slalom	DNF			
Adriana Jelkinkova	Giant slalom	58.34	58.63	1:56.97	6
Adriana Jelkinkova	Super-G			1:07.22	13
Adriana Jelkinkova	Combined	1:05.54	36.67	1:42.21	3rd place, bronze medalist(s)

== Bobsleigh ==
Netherlands qualified 4 athletes.

Girls

Athlete	Event	Final			
Athlete	Event	Run 1	Run 2	Total	Rank
Marije van Huigenbosch; Sanne Dekker	Two-Girls	56.04	55.58	1:51.62	1st place, gold medalist(s)
Kimberley Bos; Mandy Groot	Two-Girls	55.95	56.20	1:52.15	3rd place, bronze medalist(s)

== Ice hockey ==
Netherlands qualified 2 athletes.

Boys

Athlete(s)	Event	Qualification		Grand final	
Athlete(s)	Event	Points	Rank	Points	Rank
Guus Simons	Individual skills	14	6 Q	12	8

Girls

Athlete(s)	Event	Qualification		Grand final	
Athlete(s)	Event	Points	Rank	Points	Rank
Julie Zwarthoed	Individual skills	35	1 Q	22	1st place, gold medalist(s)

== Short track ==
Netherlands qualified 2 athletes.

Boys

Athlete	Event	Quarterfinals		Semifinals		Finals	
Athlete	Event	Time	Rank	Time	Rank	Time	Rank
Josse Antonissen	Boys' 500 metres	48.738	2 Q	1:00.507	5 qB	47.314	3
Josse Antonissen	Boys' 1000 metres	DNF		did not advance			

Girls

Athlete	Event	Quarterfinals		Semifinals		Finals	
Athlete	Event	Time	Rank	Time	Rank	Time	Rank
Aafke Soet	Girls' 500 metres	47.770	2 Q	46.980	3 qB	48.362	3
Aafke Soet	Girls' 1000 metres	1:38.302	3 qCD	1:45.165	3 qD	1:40.885	1

Mixed

Athlete	Event	Semifinals		Finals	
Athlete	Event	Time	Rank	Time	Rank
Team E Sarah Warren (USA); Kei Saito (JPN); Lin Yu-Tzu (TPE); Josse Antonissen (NED)	Mixed Team Relay	4:36.208	4 qB	4:30.383	3
Team H Anna Gamorina (RUS); Hyo Jun Lim (KOR); Aafke Soet (NED); Michal Prokop (CZE)	Mixed Team Relay	4:26.027	2 Q	PEN	

== Skeleton ==
Netherlands qualified 1 athlete.

Girls

Athlete	Event	Final			
Athlete	Event	Run 1	Run 2	Total	Rank
Astrid Ekelmans	Girls' individual	CAN	1:01.68	1:01.68	13

== Ski jumping ==
Netherlands qualified 1 athlete.

Boys

Athlete	Event	1st Jump		2nd Jump		Overall	
Athlete	Event	Distance	Points	Distance	Points	Points	Rank
Oldrik van der Aalst	Boys' individual	65.5m	103.0	68.5m	112.2	215.2	11

== Snowboarding ==
Netherlands qualified 2 athletes.

Boys

Athlete	Event	Qualifying			Semifinal			Final		
Athlete	Event	Run 1	Run 2	Rank	Run 1	Run 2	Rank	Run 1	Run 2	Rank
Sean Taylor	Boys' halfpipe	34.25	60.50	7 q	47.00	67.00	6 Q	49.25	39.00	11
Jesse Augustinus	Boys' slopestyle	38.50	61.25	9 Q				24.00	28.25	18

== Speed skating ==
Netherlands qualified 4 athletes.

Boys

Athlete	Event	Race 1	Race 2	Total	Rank
Bastijn Boele	Boys' 1500 m			2:02.28	5
Bastijn Boele	Boys' 3000 m			4:21.02	8
Bastijn Boele	Boys' Mass Start			7:14.69	10
Peter Lenderink	Boys' 1500 m			2:04.04	11
Peter Lenderink	Boys' 3000 m			4:14.93	4
Peter Lenderink	Boys' Mass Start			8:21.82	21

Girls

Athlete	Event	Race 1	Race 2	Total	Rank
Suzanne Schulting	Girls' 500 m	43.96	43.76	87.72	4
Suzanne Schulting	Girls' 1500 m			2:25.78	16
Suzanne Schulting	Girls' Mass Start			LAP	
Sanneke de Neeling	Girls' 1500 m			2:09.54	2nd place, silver medalist(s)
Sanneke de Neeling	Girls' 3000 m			4:37.33	1st place, gold medalist(s)
Sanneke de Neeling	Girls' Mass Start			6:01.06	1st place, gold medalist(s)

== See also ==
- Netherlands at the 2012 Summer Olympics
