= China at the 2012 Winter Youth Olympics =

- IOC code: CHN
- NOC: Chinese Olympic Committee
- Website: www.olympic.cn (in Chinese and English)

in Innsbruck
- Competitors: 23 in 8 sports
- Flag bearer: Yan Han
- Medals Ranked 2nd: Gold 7 Silver 4 Bronze 4 Total 15

Winter Youth Olympics appearances (overview)
- 2012; 2016; 2020; 2024

China competed at the 2012 Winter Youth Olympics in Innsbruck, Austria.

== Medalists ==
Medal	Name	Sport	Event	Date
Gold	Liu An	Speed skating	Boys' 500m	14 Jan
Gold	Cheng Fangming	Biathlon	Boys' sprint	15 Jan
Gold	Yan Han	Figure skating	Boys' Singles	16 Jan
Gold	Yu Xiaoyu; Jin Yang	Figure skating	Pair Skating	16 Jan
Gold	Fan Yang	Speed Skating	Boys' 1500m	16 Jan
Gold	Fan Yang	Speed Skating	Boys' 3000m	18 Jan
Gold	Fan Yang	Speed Skating	Boys' Mass Start	20 Jan
Silver	Shi Xiaoxuan	Speed skating	Girls' 500m	14 Jan
Silver	Liu An	Speed Skating	Boys' 1500m	16 Jan
Silver	Xu Aili	Short Track	Girls' 1000m	18 Jan
Silver	Xu Aili	Short Track	Girls' 500m	19 Jan
Bronze	Cheng Fangming	Biathlon	Boys' Pursuit	16 Jan
Bronze	Li Zijun	Figure skating	Girls' Singles	17 Jan
Bronze	Xu Hongzhi	Short Track	Boys' 1000m	18 Jan
Bronze	Xu Hongzhi	Short Track	Boys' 500m	19 Jan

== Biathlon ==
China qualified 3 athletes.

Boys

Athlete	Event	Final		
Athlete	Event	Time	Misses	Rank
Cheng Fangming	Sprint	19:21.7	1	1st place, gold medalist(s)
Cheng Fangming	Pursuit	28:57.7	7	3rd place, bronze medalist(s)

Girls

Athlete	Event	Final		
Athlete	Event	Time	Misses	Rank
Song Na	Sprint	19:19.2	2	17
Song Na	Pursuit	23:25.0	7	23
Zhang Zhaohan	Sprint	19:51.1	4	23
Zhang Zhaohan	Pursuit	31:40.4	7	17

== Cross-country skiing ==
China qualified 1 athlete.

Girls

Athlete	Event	Final	
Athlete	Event	Time	Rank
Chun Ma	5km classical	16:34.9	20

Sprint

Athlete	Event	Qualification		Quarterfinal		Semifinal		Final	
Athlete	Event	Total	Rank	Total	Rank	Total	Rank	Total	Rank
Chun Ma	Girls' sprint	2:02.34	16 Q	2:10.0	5	did not advance			

== Curling ==
China qualified a team.

Roster

- Fourth: Wang Jinbo
- Third: Yang Ying
- Skip: Bai Yang
- Lead: Cao Ying

=== Mixed team ===
Final Round Robin Standings

Blue Group	Skip	W	L
United States	Korey Dropkin	7	0
Switzerland	Michael Brunner	6	1
Czech Republic	Marek Černovský	4	3
China	Bai Yang	3	4
Norway	Markus Skogvold	3	4
South Korea	Kang Sue-yeon	2	5
New Zealand	Luke Steele	2	5
Estonia	Robert-Kent Päll	1	6

Draw 1

Sheet D	1	2	3	4	5	6	7	8	9	Final
China (Bai)	0	0	0	0	2	0	1	1	0	4
Norway (Skogvold)	1	1	0	0	0	2	0	0	1	5

Draw 2

Sheet B	1	2	3	4	5	6	7	8	Final
China (Bai)	2	0	1	0	1	3	1	X	8
South Korea (Kang)	0	0	0	1	0	0	0	X	1

Draw 3

Sheet D	1	2	3	4	5	6	7	8	Final
New Zealand (Steele)	1	1	2	0	0	1	0	2	7
China (Bai)	0	0	0	3	2	0	1	0	6

Draw 4

Sheet C	1	2	3	4	5	6	7	8	Final
Czech Republic (Černovský)	0	1	0	0	3	0	1	0	5
China (Bai)	1	0	2	0	0	2	0	1	6

Draw 5

Sheet A	1	2	3	4	5	6	7	8	Final
China (Bai)	1	0	0	1	0	1	0	X	3
Switzerland (Brunner)	0	1	1	0	1	0	4	X	7

Draw 6

Sheet C	1	2	3	4	5	6	7	8	Final
China (Bai)	0	2	0	2	1	0	0	2	7
Estonia (Päll)	0	0	2	0	0	0	1	0	3

Draw 7

Sheet A	1	2	3	4	5	6	7	8	Final
United States (Dropkin)	1	1	4	0	1	1	X	X	8
China (Bai)	0	0	0	1	0	0	X	X	1

Tiebreaker

Sheet D	1	2	3	4	5	6	7	8	9	Final
China (Bai)	1	0	1	0	0	1	0	X	X	3
Norway (Skogvold)	0	2	0	3	0	0	1	X	X	6

=== Mixed doubles ===
Round of 32

Sheet B	1	2	3	4	5	6	7	8	Final
Wang Jinbo (CHN); Ina Roll Backe (NOR)	2	2	0	1	0	2	0	1	8
Camilla Schnabel (AUT); Jordan Wåhlin (SWE)	0	0	2	0	3	0	2	0	7

Sheet C	1	2	3	4	5	6	7	8	Final
Corryn Brown (CAN); Martin Reichel (AUT)	1	0	0	3	0	1	1	0	6
Shingo Usui (JPN); Cao Ying (CHN)	0	1	1	0	1	0	0	1	4

Sheet A	1	2	3	4	5	6	7	8	Final
Mathias Genner (AUT); Lisa Gisler (SUI)	0	0	0	1	0	1	0	X	2
Yang Ying (CHN); Thomas Howell (USA)	3	1	2	0	3	0	1	X	10

Sheet D	1	2	3	4	5	6	7	8	Final
Alžběta Baudyšová (CZE); Bai Yang (CHN)	0	0	0	5	1	0	3	0	9
Amos Mosaner (ITA); Irena Brettbacher (AUT)	1	1	1	0	0	4	0	3	10

Round of 16

Sheet D	1	2	3	4	5	6	7	8	Final
Yang Ying (CHN); Thomas Howell (USA)	0	3	0	0	0	1	0	X	4
Martin Sesaker (NOR); Kim Eun-bi (KOR)	2	0	2	1	2	0	3	X	10

Sheet C	1	2	3	4	5	6	7	8	Final
Michael Brunner (SUI); Nicole Muskatewitz (GER)	1	1	1	1	1	0	1	X	6
Wang Jinbo (CHN); Ina Roll Backe (NOR)	0	0	0	0	0	1	0	X	1

== Figure skating ==
China qualified 4 athletes.

Boys

Athlete(s)	Event	SP/OD		FS/FD		Total	
Athlete(s)	Event	Points	Rank	Points	Rank	Points	Rank
Yan Han	Singles	59.65	1	132.80	1	192.45	1st place, gold medalist(s)

Girls

Athlete(s)	Event	SP/OD		FS/FD		Total	
Athlete(s)	Event	Points	Rank	Points	Rank	Points	Rank
Li Zijun	Singles	50.92	3	106.78	2	157.70	3rd place, bronze medalist(s)

Pairs

Athlete(s)	Event	SP/OD		FS/FD		Total	
Athlete(s)	Event	Points	Rank	Points	Rank	Points	Rank
Yu Xiaoyu; Jin Yang	Pair Skating	51.79	1	102.03	1	153.82	1st place, gold medalist(s)

== Ice hockey ==
China qualified 2 athletes.

Boys

Athlete(s)	Event	Qualification		Grand final	
Athlete(s)	Event	Points	Rank	Points	Rank
Liu Qing	Individual skills	12	7 Q	13	7

Girls

Athlete(s)	Event	Qualification		Grand final	
Athlete(s)	Event	Points	Rank	Points	Rank
Sun Jiayue	Individual skills	4	12	did not advance	

== Short track ==
China qualified 4 athletes.

Boys

Athlete	Event	Quarterfinals		Semifinals		Finals	
Athlete	Event	Time	Rank	Time	Rank	Time	Rank
Lu Xiucheng	Boys' 500 metres	44.504	2 Q	1:20.806	4 qB	PEN	
Lu Xiucheng	Boys' 1000 metres	1:30.764	3 qCD	1:32.822	1 qC	1:32.369	1
Xu Hongzhi	Boys' 500 metres	43.022	1 Q	42.832	1 Q	42.637	3rd place, bronze medalist(s)
Xu Hongzhi	Boys' 1000 metres	1:34.610	1 Q	1:31.377	2 Q	1:29.576	3rd place, bronze medalist(s)

Girls

Athlete	Event	Quarterfinals		Semifinals		Finals	
Athlete	Event	Time	Rank	Time	Rank	Time	Rank
Qu Chunyu	Girls' 500 metres	46.378	1 Q	45.624	2 Q	PEN	
Qu Chunyu	Girls' 1000 metres	1:39.607	1 Q	PEN		did not advance	
Xu Aili	Girls' 500 metres	45.416	1 Q	45.673	1 Q	44.593	2nd place, silver medalist(s)
Xu Aili	Girls' 1000 metres	1:36.614	1 Q	1:35.362	2 Q	1:33.351	2nd place, silver medalist(s)

Mixed

Athlete	Event	Semifinals		Finals	
Athlete	Event	Time	Rank	Time	Rank
Team B Jung Hyun Park (KOR); Lu Xiucheng (CHN); Xu Aili (CHN); Jack Burrows (GBR)	Mixed Team Relay	4:21.656	1 Q	4:21.713	1st place, gold medalist(s)
Team F Qu Chunyu (CHN); Xu Hongzhi (CHN); Mariya Dolgopolova (UKR); Aydin Djemal (GBR)	Mixed Team Relay	4:21.227	1 Q	4:24.665	2nd place, silver medalist(s)

== Ski jumping ==
China qualified 1 athlete.

Girls

Athlete	Event	1st Jump		2nd Jump		Overall	
Athlete	Event	Distance	Points	Distance	Points	Points	Rank
Li Xueyao	Girls' individual	59.5m	82.1	58.0m	79.5	161.6	11

== Speed skating ==
China qualified 4 athletes.

Boys

Athlete	Event	Race 1	Race 2	Total	Rank
Liu An	Boys' 500 m	37.67	37.83	75.50	1st place, gold medalist(s)
Liu An	Boys' 1500 m			2:00.28	2nd place, silver medalist(s)
Liu An	Boys' Mass Start			LAP	
Yang Fan	Boys' 1500 m			1:54.20	1st place, gold medalist(s)
Yang Fan	Boys' 3000 m			4:03.22	1st place, gold medalist(s)
Yang Fan	Boys' Mass Start			7:10.23	1st place, gold medalist(s)

Girls

Athlete	Event	Race 1	Race 2	Total	Rank
Shi Xiaoxuan	Girls' 500 m	41.98	42.34	84.32	2nd place, silver medalist(s)
Shi Xiaoxuan	Girls' 1500 m			2:15.98	9
Shi Xiaoxuan	Girls' Mass Start			6:09.17	11
Fu Yuan	Girls' 1500 m			2:11.94	4
Fu Yuan	Girls' 3000 m			4:47.52	5
Fu Yuan	Girls' Mass Start			LAP	

== See also ==
- China at the 2012 Summer Olympics
