= Japan at the 2012 Winter Youth Olympics =

- IOC code: JPN
- NOC: Japanese Olympic Committee
- Website: www.joc.or.jp

in Innsbruck
- Competitors: 33 in 13 sports
- Flag bearer: Sumire Kikuchi
- Medals Ranked 8th: Gold 2 Silver 5 Bronze 9 Total 16

Winter Youth Olympics appearances (overview)
- 2012; 2016; 2020; 2024

Japan competed at the 2012 Winter Youth Olympics in Innsbruck, Austria.

== Medalists ==
Medal	Name	Sport	Event	Date
Gold	Sara Takanashi	Ski jumping	Girls' individual	14 Jan
Gold	Hikaru Ōe	Snowboarding	Girls' halfpipe	15 Jan
Silver	Shōma Uno	Figure skating	Boys' singles	16 Jan
Silver	Kentarō Ishikawa	Cross-country skiing	Boys' 10km classical	17 Jan
Silver	Seitarō Ichinohe	Speed skating	Boys' 3000m	18 Jan
Silver	Rio Harada	Speed skating	Girls' 3000m	18 Jan
Silver	Seitarō Ichinohe	Speed skating	Boys' mass start	20 Jan
Bronze	Yukiya Satō	Ski jumping	Boys' individual	14 Jan
Bronze	Toshihiro Kakui	Speed skating	Boys' 500m	14 Jan
Bronze	Gō Yamamoto	Nordic combined	Individual	15 Jan
Bronze	Taku Hiraoka	Snowboarding	Boys' halfpipe	15 Jan
Bronze	Seitarō Ichinohe	Speed skating	Boys' 1500m	16 Jan
Bronze	Sumire Kikuchi	Speed skating	Girls' 1500m	16 Jan
Bronze	Sumire Kikuchi	Short track	Girls' 1000m	18 Jan
Bronze	Seiya Furukawa	Ice hockey	Boys' individual skills challenge	19 Jan
Bronze	Sumire Kikuchi	Speed skating	Girls' mass start	20 Jan

Medals by sport
Sport	1st place, gold medalist(s)	2nd place, silver medalist(s)	3rd place, bronze medalist(s)	Total
Ski jumping	1	0	1	2
Snowboarding	1	0	1	2
Speed skating	0	3	4	7
Cross-country	0	1	0	1
Figure skating	0	1	0	1
Ice hockey	0	0	1	1
Nordic combined	0	0	1	1
Short track	0	0	1	1
Total	2	5	9	16

== Alpine Skiing ==
One coach.

Boys

Athlete	Event	Final			
Athlete	Event	Run 1	Run 2	Total	Rank
Seiya Hiroshima (廣島 聖也)	Slalom	47.64	42.68	1:30.32	25
Seiya Hiroshima (廣島 聖也)	Giant slalom	59.09	55.67	1:54.76	7
Seiya Hiroshima (廣島 聖也)	Super-G			1:06.00	12
Seiya Hiroshima (廣島 聖也)	Combined	1:05.54	37.86	1:43.40	11

Girls

Athlete	Event	Final			
Athlete	Event	Run 1	Run 2	Total	Rank
Kayo Denda (傳田 佳代)	Slalom	DNF			
Kayo Denda (傳田 佳代)	Giant slalom	1:00.99	1:01.68	2:02.67	23
Kayo Denda (傳田 佳代)	Super-G			1:10.77	23
Kayo Denda (傳田 佳代)	Combined	1:09.29	38.95	1:48.24	18

== Bobsleigh ==
Girls

Athlete	Event	Final			
Athlete	Event	Run 1	Run 2	Total	Rank
Maria Oshigiri (押切 麻李亜); Shizuka Uehara (上原 志津佳)	Two-girls	57.55	57.60	1:55.15	8

== Cross-country skiing ==
One coach.

Boys

Athlete	Event	Final	
Athlete	Event	Time	Rank
Kentarō Ishikawa (石川 謙太郎)	10km classical	29:40.2	2nd place, silver medalist(s)
Takuto Terabayashi (寺林 拓人)	10km classical	31:30.9	17

Girls

Athlete	Event	Final	
Athlete	Event	Time	Rank
Maki Ōdaira (大平 麻生)	5km classical	16:34.8	19
Kozue Takizawa (滝沢 こずえ)	5km classical	15:45.3	8

Sprint

Athlete	Event	Qualification		Quarterfinal		Semifinal		Final	
Athlete	Event	Total	Rank	Total	Rank	Total	Rank	Total	Rank
Kentarō Ishikawa (石川 謙太郎)	Boys' sprint	1:45.61	7 Q	1:48.8	1 Q	1:46.2	2 Q	1:49.9	6
Takuto Terabayashi (寺林 拓人)	Boys' sprint	1:51.89	32	did not advance					
Maki Ōdaira (大平 麻生)	Girls' sprint	2:13.94	34	did not advance					
Kozue Takizawa (滝沢 こずえ)	Girls' sprint	2:10.80	29 Q	2:05.6	6	did not advance			

== Curling ==
One team leader.

=== Mixed Team ===
Boys

- Shingo Usui (臼井 槙吾) Skip
- Tsukasa Horigome (堀篭 司) Second

Girls

- Mizuki Kitaguchi (北口 瑞季) Third
- Mako Tamakuma (玉熊 真子) Lead

=== Round-robin standings ===
Final Round Robin Standings

Red Group	Skip	W	L
Sweden	Rasmus Wranå	6	1
Canada	Thomas Scoffin	5	2
Japan	Shingo Usui	4	3
Italy	Amos Mosaner	4	3
Great Britain	Duncan Menzies	3	4
Russia	Mikhail Vaskov	3	4
Austria	Mathias Genner	2	5
Germany	Daniel Rothballer	1	6

==== Round-robin results ====
Draw 1

Sheet D	1	2	3	4	5	6	7	8	Final
Japan (Usui) 🔨	1	0	1	0	0	1	0	1	4
Sweden (Wranå)	0	1	0	3	0	0	1	0	5

Draw 2

Sheet B	1	2	3	4	5	6	7	8	Final
Japan (Usui)	0	0	0	2	0	3	0	X	5
Italy (Mosaner) 🔨	1	0	0	0	1	0	1	X	3

Draw 3

Sheet D	1	2	3	4	5	6	7	8	9	Final
Austria (Genner)	0	2	0	0	0	3	0	0	0	5
Japan (Usui) 🔨	1	0	0	1	0	0	2	1	2	7

Draw 4

Sheet D	1	2	3	4	5	6	7	8	Final
Russia (Vaskov)	0	0	2	0	1	0	1	2	6
Japan (Usui) 🔨	0	1	0	3	0	1	0	0	5

Draw 5

Sheet A	1	2	3	4	5	6	7	8	9	Final
Japan (Usui)	0	1	0	0	0	2	0	2	2	7
Great Britain (Menzies) 🔨	1	0	0	0	2	0	2	0	0	5

Draw 6

Sheet C	1	2	3	4	5	6	7	8	Final
Japan (Usui)	0	0	3	3	2	1	X	X	9
Germany (Rothballer) 🔨	1	1	0	0	0	0	X	X	2

Draw 7

Sheet A	1	2	3	4	5	6	7	8	Final
Canada (Scoffin) 🔨	3	0	0	0	4	0	2	X	9
Japan (Usui)	0	1	0	1	0	2	0	X	4

==== Quarterfinals ====
Sheet D	1	2	3	4	5	6	7	8	Final
Japan (Usui)	0	0	1	1	0	0	1	0	3
Switzerland (Brunner) 🔨	0	0	0	0	0	3	0	1	4

=== Mixed doubles ===
==== Round of 32 ====
Sheet C	1	2	3	4	5	6	7	8	Final
Thomas Scoffin (CAN); Kelsi Heath (NZL)	0	0	4	1	1	0	3	X	9
Mizuki Kitaguchi (JPN); Thomas Muirhead (GBR) 🔨	1	2	0	0	0	2	0	X	5

Sheet C	1	2	3	4	5	6	7	8	Final
Corryn Brown (CAN); Martin Reichel (AUT) 🔨	1	0	0	3	0	1	1	0	6
Shingo Usui (JPN); Cao Ying (CHN)	0	1	1	0	1	0	0	1	4

Sheet C	1	2	3	4	5	6	7	8	Final
Robert-Kent Päll (EST); Emily Gray (CAN)	0	0	0	2	0	0	0	X	2
Anastasia Moskaleva (RUS); Tsukasa Horigome (JPN) 🔨	1	1	3	0	1	1	1	X	8

Sheet C	1	2	3	4	5	6	7	8	Final
Frederike Manner (GER); Derek Oryniak (CAN)	0	0	0	1	0	0	X	X	1
Yoo Min-hyeon (KOR); Mako Tamakuma (JPN) 🔨	3	2	3	0	5	1	X	X	14

==== Round of 16 ====
Sheet B	1	2	3	4	5	6	7	8	Final
Anastasia Moskaleva (RUS); Tsukasa Horigome (JPN) 🔨	1	0	2	2	1	1	X	X	7
Marek Černovský (CZE); Rachel Hannen (GBR)	0	1	0	0	0	0	X	X	1

Sheet B	1	2	3	4	5	6	7	8	Final
Yoo Min-hyeon (KOR); Mako Tamakuma (JPN) 🔨	2	0	3	1	1	0	2	X	9
Amos Mosaner (ITA); Irena Brettbacher (AUT)	0	1	0	0	0	3	0	X	4

==== Quarterfinals ====
Sheet A	1	2	3	4	5	6	7	8	9	Final
Martin Sesaker (NOR); Kim Eun-bi (KOR) 🔨	0	3	0	1	0	0	1	1	1	7
Anastasia Moskaleva (RUS); Tsukasa Horigome (JPN)	1	0	2	0	1	2	0	0	0	6

Sheet C	1	2	3	4	5	6	7	8	Final
Duncan Menzies (GBR); Taylor Anderson (USA) 🔨	1	0	0	1	0	1	1	0	4
Yoo Min-hyeon (KOR); Mako Tamakuma (JPN)	0	2	1	0	3	0	0	1	7

==== Semifinals ====
Sheet D	1	2	3	4	5	6	7	8	Final
Martin Sesaker (NOR); Kim Eun-bi (KOR) 🔨	0	5	0	2	0	2	1	3	13
Yoo Min-hyeon (KOR); Mako Tamakuma (JPN)	2	0	1	0	3	0	0	0	6

==== Bronze Medal Game ====
Sheet B	1	2	3	4	5	6	7	8	9	Final
Korey Dropkin (USA); Marina Verenich (RUS) 🔨	1	0	1	0	2	0	1	0	1	6
Yoo Min-hyeon (KOR); Mako Tamakuma (JPN)	0	1	0	1	0	1	0	2	0	5

== Figure skating ==
One team leader and two coaches.

Boys

Athlete(s)	Event	SP/OD		FS/FD		Total	
Athlete(s)	Event	Points	Rank	Points	Rank	Points	Rank
Shōma Uno (宇野 昌磨)	Singles	51.52	6	115.63	2	167.15	2nd place, silver medalist(s)
Shū Nakamura (中村 優)	Singles	42.34	10	111.88	3	154.22	6

Girls

Athlete(s)	Event	SP/OD		FS/FD		Total	
Athlete(s)	Event	Points	Rank	Points	Rank	Points	Rank
Risa Shōji (庄司 理紗)	Singles	47.29	6	88.03	5	135.32	6

Mixed

Athletes	Event	Boys'			Girls'			Ice Dance			Total	
Athletes	Event	Score	Rank	Points	Score	Rank	Points	Score	Rank	Points	Points	Rank
Team 4 Shoma Uno (JPN); Jordan Bauth (USA); Eugenia Tkachenka/Yuri Hulitski (BLR)	Team Trophy	112.72	2	7	77.84	2	7	44.36	7	2	16	1st place, gold medalist(s)

== Freestyle Skiing ==
One coach.

Ski Cross

Athlete	Event	Qualifying		1/4 finals	Semifinals	Final
Athlete	Event	Time	Rank	Rank	Rank	Rank
Yūki Nakagawa (中川 雄生)	Boys' ski cross	1:00.27	16	Cancelled		

Ski Half-Pipe

Athlete	Event	Qualifying		Final	
Athlete	Event	Points	Rank	Points	Rank
Nanaho Kiriyama (桐山 菜々穂)	Girls' ski half-pipe	49.00	8	did not advance	

== Ice Hockey ==
One manager.

Boys

Athlete(s)	Event	Qualification		Grand final	
Athlete(s)	Event	Points	Rank	Points	Rank
Seiya Furukawa (古川 誠也)	Individual skills	30	2 Q	19	3rd place, bronze medalist(s)

Girls

Athlete(s)	Event	Qualification		Grand final	
Athlete(s)	Event	Points	Rank	Points	Rank
Akane Deguchi (出口 茜)	Individual skills	20	4 Q	16	7

== Nordic Combined ==
One coach.

Boys

Athlete	Event	Ski jumping		Cross-country		Final	
Athlete	Event	Points	Rank	Deficit	Ski Time	Total Time	Rank
Gō Yamamoto (山元 豪)	Boys' individual	132.5	2	0:20	26:19.9	26:39.9	3rd place, bronze medalist(s)

== Short Track ==
One coach.

Boys

Athlete	Event	Quarterfinals		Semifinals		Finals	
Athlete	Event	Time	Rank	Time	Rank	Time	Rank
Kei Saitō (斉藤 慧)	Boys' 500 metres	43.173	2 Q	43.000	3 qB	45.6000	1
Kei Saitō (斉藤 慧)	Boys' 1000 metres	1:30.502	1 Q	1:29.689	2 Q	1:30.142	4

Girls

Athlete	Event	Quarterfinals		Semifinals		Finals	
Athlete	Event	Time	Rank	Time	Rank	Time	Rank
Sumire Kikuchi (菊池 純礼)	Girls' 500 metres	53.823	3 Q*	46.200	3 qB	48.337	2
Sumire Kikuchi (菊池 純礼)	Girls' 1000 metres	1:36.670	2 Q	1:35.301	2 Q	1:34.254	3rd place, bronze medalist(s)

- * Given advantage due to interference by anothersakter

Mixed

Athlete	Event	Semifinals		Finals	
Athlete	Event	Time	Rank	Time	Rank
Team D Elisabeth Witt (GER); Thomas Insuk Hong (USA); Sumire Kikuchi (JPN); Yin-Cheng Chang (TPE)	Mixed Team Relay	4:23.141	4 qB	4:24.360	1
Team E Sarah Warren (USA); Kei Saito (JPN); Lin Yu-Tzu (TPE); Josse Antonissen (NED)	Mixed Team Relay	4:36.208	4 qB	4:30.383	3

== Skeleton ==
Boys

Athlete	Event	Final			
Athlete	Event	Run 1	Run 2	Total	Rank
Dan Satō (佐藤 弾)	Boys' individual	59.55	59.34	1:58.89	9
Hiroki Nokura (野倉 大貴)	Boys' individual	59.92	59.80	1:59.72	10

Girls

Athlete	Event	Final			
Athlete	Event	Run 1	Run 2	Total	Rank
Saki Andō (安藤 早紀)	Girls' individual	CAN	1:02.42	1:02.42	14

== Ski jumping ==
Two coaches.

Boys

Athlete	Event	1st Jump		2nd Jump		Overall	
Athlete	Event	Distance	Points	Distance	Points	Points	Rank
Yukiya Satō (佐藤 幸椰)	Boys' individual	77.0m	136.6	73.0m	123.5	260.1	3rd place, bronze medalist(s)

Girls

Athlete	Event	1st Jump		2nd Jump		Overall	
Athlete	Event	Distance	Points	Distance	Points	Points	Rank
Sara Takanashi (高梨 沙羅)	Girls' individual	76.5m	134.4	76.5m	134.9	269.3	1st place, gold medalist(s)

Team w/Nordic Combined

Athlete	Event	1st Round	2nd Round	Total	Rank
Sara Takanashi; Go Yamamoto; Yukiya Satō	Mixed Team	235.3	340.7	576.0	5

== Snowboarding ==
One manager.

Boys

Athlete	Event	Qualifying			Semifinal			Final		
Athlete	Event	Run 1	Run 2	Rank	Run 1	Run 2	Rank	Run 1	Run 2	Rank
Taku Hiraoka (平岡 卓)	Boys' halfpipe	91.75	95.00	1 Q				55.75	84.25	3rd place, bronze medalist(s)

Girls

Athlete	Event	Qualifying			Semifinal			Final		
Athlete	Event	Run 1	Run 2	Rank	Run 1	Run 2	Rank	Run 1	Run 2	Rank
Hikaru Ōe (大江 光)	Girls' halfpipe	82.00	78.00	2 Q				95.75	96.25	1st place, gold medalist(s)

== Speed Skating ==
One manager.

Boys

Athlete	Event	Race 1	Race 2	Total	Rank
Toshihiro Kakui (角井 俊洋)	Boys' 500 m	38.88	38.94	77.82	3rd place, bronze medalist(s)
Toshihiro Kakui (角井 俊洋)	Boys' 1500 m			2:05.02	12
Toshihiro Kakui (角井 俊洋)	Boys' Mass Start			7:13.10	4
Seitarō Ichinohe (一戸 誠太郎)	Boys' 1500 m			2:00.30	3rd place, bronze medalist(s)
Seitarō Ichinohe (一戸 誠太郎)	Boys' 3000 m			4:10.00	2nd place, silver medalist(s)
Seitarō Ichinohe (一戸 誠太郎)	Boys' Mass Start			7:11.45	2nd place, silver medalist(s)

Girls

Athlete	Event	Race 1	Race 2	Total	Rank
Sumire Kikuchi (菊池 純礼)	Girls' 1500 m			2:11.33	3rd place, bronze medalist(s)
Sumire Kikuchi (菊池 純礼)	Girls' Mass Start			6:01.24	3rd place, bronze medalist(s)
Rio Harada (原田 梨央)	Girls' 1500 m			2:15.15	7
Rio Harada (原田 梨央)	Girls' 3000 m			4:41.85	2nd place, silver medalist(s)
Rio Harada (原田 梨央)	Girls' Mass Start			6:03.56	6

== See also ==
- Japan at the 2012 Summer Olympics
