= Kazakhstan at the 2012 Winter Youth Olympics =

- IOC code: KAZ
- NOC: Kazakhstan Olympic Committee

in Innsbruck
- Competitors: 38 in 10 sports
- Flag bearer: Kanat Khamitov
- Medals Ranked 23rd: Gold 0 Silver 1 Bronze 2 Total 3

Winter Youth Olympics appearances (overview)
- 2012; 2016; 2020; 2024

Kazakhstan competed at the 2012 Winter Youth Olympics in Innsbruck, Austria.

== Medalists ==
Medal	Name	Sport	Event	Date
Silver	Galina Vishnevskaya	Biathlon	Girls' sprint	15 Jan
Bronze	Galina Vishnevskaya	Biathlon	Girls' Pursuit	16 Jan
Bronze	Sergey Malyshev	Cross-country skiing	Boys' 10km Classical	17 Jan

== Alpine skiing ==
Kazakhstan qualified 2 athletes.

Boys

Athlete	Event	Final			
Athlete	Event	Run 1	Run 2	Total	Rank
Ruslan Sabitov	Slalom	45.55	DNF		
Ruslan Sabitov	Giant slalom	1:03.52	58.05	2:01.57	26
Ruslan Sabitov	Super-G			1:10.32	33
Ruslan Sabitov	Combined	1:07.74	DNF		

Girls

Athlete	Event	Final			
Athlete	Event	Run 1	Run 2	Total	Rank
Mariya Grigorova	Slalom	DNF			
Mariya Grigorova	Giant slalom	1:10.94	1:11.75	2:22.69	40
Mariya Grigorova	Super-G			DSQ	

== Biathlon ==
Kazakhstan qualified 3 athletes.

Boys

Athlete	Event	Final		
Athlete	Event	Time	Misses	Rank
Ruslan Bessov	Sprint	22:19.8	4	31
Ruslan Bessov	Pursuit	34:12.2	9	31

Girls

Athlete	Event	Final		
Athlete	Event	Time	Misses	Rank
Anastassiya Kondratyeva	Sprint	20:36.4	3	32
Anastassiya Kondratyeva	Pursuit	34:04.6	6	27
Galina Vishnevskaya	Sprint	17:55.2	2	2nd place, silver medalist(s)
Galina Vishnevskaya	Pursuit	27:44.4	4	3rd place, bronze medalist(s)

Mixed

Athlete	Event	Final		
Athlete	Event	Time	Misses	Rank
Galina Vishnevskaya; Alexandra Kun; Ruslan Bessov; Sergey Malyshev	Cross-Country-Biathlon Mixed Relay	1:06:47.8	4+8	10

== Cross-country skiing ==
Kazakhstan qualified 2 athletes.

Boys

Athlete	Event	Final	
Athlete	Event	Time	Rank
Sergey Malyshev	10km classical	29:57.5	3rd place, bronze medalist(s)

Girls

Athlete	Event	Final	
Athlete	Event	Time	Rank
Alexandra Kun	5km classical	17:11.6	26

Sprint

Athlete	Event	Qualification		Quarterfinal		Semifinal		Final	
Athlete	Event	Total	Rank	Total	Rank	Total	Rank	Total	Rank
Sergey Malyshev	Boys' sprint	1:46.77	12 Q	1:49.2	2 Q	1:57.2	4	did not advance	
Alexandra Kun	Girls' sprint	2:12.94	32	did not advance					

Mixed

Athlete	Event	Final		
Athlete	Event	Time	Misses	Rank
Galina Vishnevskaya; Alexandra Kun; Ruslan Bessov; Sergey Malyshev	Cross-Country-Biathlon Mixed Relay	1:06:47.8	4+8	10

== Figure skating ==
Kazakhstan qualified 3 athletes.

Boys

Athlete(s)	Event	SP/OD		FS/FD		Total	
Athlete(s)	Event	Points	Rank	Points	Rank	Points	Rank
Alexander Lyan	Singles	35.97	14	59.90	14	95.87	14

Pairs

Athlete(s)	Event	SP/OD		FS/FD		Total	
Athlete(s)	Event	Points	Rank	Points	Rank	Points	Rank
Karina Uzurova; Ilias Ali	Ice Dancing	43.71	5	59.06	6	102.77	6

Mixed

Athletes	Event	Boys'			Girls'			Ice Dance			Total	
Athletes	Event	Score	Rank	Points	Score	Rank	Points	Score	Rank	Points	Points	Rank
Team 6 Alexander Lyan (KAZ); Park So-youn (KOR); Estelle Elizabeth/Romain Le Gac (FRA)	Team Trophy	60.45	8	1	96.84	1	8	66.88	4	5	14	3rd place, bronze medalist(s)

== Freestyle skiing ==
Kazakhstan qualified 1 athlete.

Ski Cross

Athlete	Event	Qualifying		1/4 finals	Semifinals	Final
Athlete	Event	Time	Rank	Rank	Rank	Rank
Alon Mullayev	Boys' ski cross	1:00.82	17	Cancelled		

== Ice hockey ==
Kazakhstan qualified a women's team.

Roster

- Nargiz Assimova
- Malika Bulembayeva
- Kamila Gembitskaya
- Anel Karimzhanova
- Botagoz Khassenova
- Anastassiya Kryshkina
- Olga Lobova
- Anastassiya Matussevich
- Raissa Minakova
- Olessya Mironenko
- Zaure Nurgaliyeva
- Zhanna Nurgaliyeva
- Anastassiya Ogay
- Akzhan Oxykbayeva
- Meruyert Ryspek
- Assem Tuleubayeva
- Saltanat Urpekbayeva

Legend
Advance to the Semifinals

Group A

Team	GP	W	OTW	OTL	L	GF	GA	Diff	PTS
Sweden	4	4	0	0	0	43	0	+43	12
Austria	4	3	0	0	1	22	6	+16	9
Germany	4	2	0	0	2	12	16	-4	6
Kazakhstan	4	1	0	0	3	3	28	-25	3
Slovakia	4	0	0	0	4	1	31	-30	0

January 14, 2012; 10:15	Kazakhstan	1–8 (0–3, 1–4, 0–1)	Austria	Tyrolean Ice Arena; Attendance: 534

Game reference

Anastassiya Ogay
Goalies
Paula Camilla Marchhart
Referee:
(Canada) Meghan Mallette
Linesmen:
(China) HUI Wang
(Finland) Taru Tanhua

	0–1	8:15 – A. Meixner (M. Kness) (PP)
	0–2	9:07 – J. Frick (N. Arnberger, V. Hummel)
	0–3	11:17 – V. Hummel (J. Frick, M. Kness)
	0–4	20:01 – A. Meixner
	0–5	22:40 – A. Schmid (J. Willenshofer, N. Prosenz)
	0–6	24:43 – A. Guertler (A. Iberer, N. Arnberger)
	0–7	26:15 – A. List (A. Meixner, J. Frick)
Z. Nurgaliyeva (S. Urpekbayeva, M. Ryspek) – 27:12	1–7
	1–8	41:58 – V. Hummel (N. Arnberger, M. Kness)

10 min
Penalties
4 min
10
Shots
32

January 15, 2012; 15:45	Sweden	17–0 (2–0, 10–0, 5–0)	Kazakhstan	Tyrolean Ice Arena; Attendance: 553

Game reference

Jessica Wahlstrom Hjorth
Goalies
Anastassiya Ogay
Referee:
(Slovakia) Zuzana Findurova
Linesmen:
(Czech Republic) Nikola Dvorakova
(Italy) Mirjam Gruber

A. Lindberg (L. Peterson) – 0:30	1–0
W. Ekstrom (M. Fuhrberg) – 11:04	2–0
C. Lillback – 15:35	3–0
A. Johansson (S. Kuller, M. Fuhrberg) – 15:58	4–0
L. Peterson (A. Lindberg) – 16:45	5–0
L. Peterson (L. Backlin, C. Lillback) – 17:00	6–0
M. Wong (K. Andersson) – 18:16	7–0
K. Andersson (A. Kjellbin) – 19:50	8–0
E. Alasalmi (K. Andersson) (PP) – 22:23	9–0
L. Peterson (M. Andersson) – 23:48	10–0
S. Kuller – 26:07	11–0
M. Wong (E. Alasalmi) – 29:49	12–0
J. Eidensten (K. Andersson) – 31:58	13–0
L. Peterson (A. Lindberg) – 33:18	14–0
A. Kjellbin (S. Kuller) – 37:28	15–0
A. Kjellbin (A. Johansson) – 39:41	16–0
J. Eidensten (E. Alasalmi) – 40:51	17–0

4 min
Penalties
6 min
83
Shots
2

January 17, 2012; 13:30	Slovakia	1–2 (0–1, 0–0, 1–1)	Kazakhstan	Tyrolean Ice Arena; Attendance: 359

Game reference

Romana Kiapesova
Goalies
Anastassiya Ogay
Referee:
(Finland) Kaisa Ketonen
Linesmen:
(Czech Republic) Nikola Dvorakova
(China) HUI Wang

	0–1	10:35 – S. Urpekbayeva (M. Ryspek, Z. Nurgaliyeva) (PP)
	0–2	33:38 – A. Matussevich (Z. Nurgaliyeva)
S. Vojtkova (D. Papesova) (PP) – 39:08	1–2

2 min
Penalties
8 min
15
Shots
31

January 18, 2012; 14:00	Kazakhstan	0–2 (0–1, 0–1, 0–0)	Germany	Tyrolean Ice Arena; Attendance: 371

Game reference
Anastassiya Ogay	Goalies	Meike Krimphove	Referee: (Slovakia) Zuzana Findurova; Linesmen: (Italy) Mirjam Gruber (Finland) Taru Tanhua
0–1 / 13:44 – L. Geelhaar (P. Szawlowski); 0–2 / 29:57 – V. Offermann (P. Szawlowski) (SH)			Referee: (Slovakia) Zuzana Findurova; Linesmen: (Italy) Mirjam Gruber (Finland) Taru Tanhua
8 min	Penalties	6 min	Referee: (Slovakia) Zuzana Findurova; Linesmen: (Italy) Mirjam Gruber (Finland) Taru Tanhua
8	Shots	34	Referee: (Slovakia) Zuzana Findurova; Linesmen: (Italy) Mirjam Gruber (Finland) Taru Tanhua

=== Semifinals ===
January 20, 2012; 12:00	Sweden	11–0 (2–0, 5–0, 4–0)	Kazakhstan	Tyrolean Ice Arena; Attendance: 713

Game reference

Jessica Wahlstrom Hjorth
Goalies
Anastassiya Ogay
Referee:
(United States) Ceci Morris
Linesmen:
(Czech Republic) Nikola Dvorakova
(China) HUI Wang

S. Kuller (M. Andersson, C. Lillback) – 0:13	1–0
M. Fuhrberg (M. Andersson) – 7:05	2–0
A. Kjellbin (W. Ekstrom, A. Lindberg) (PP) – 17:17	3–0
M. Andersson (K. Andersson) – 17:52	4–0
M. Wong (E. Alasalmi, W. Ekstrom) (SH) – 21:56	5–0
S. Kuller (E. Alasalmi, K. Andersson) – 28:18	6–0
M. Fuhrberg (J. Eidensten, A. Johansson) – 29:55	7–0
J. Eidensten (M. Andersson, C. Lillback) (SH) – 35:23	8–0
L. Backlin (A. Johansson, J. Eidensten) (SH) – 35:53	9–0
A. Lindberg – 36:46	10–0
A. Lindberg (A. Kjellbin) – 41:24	11–0

10 min
Penalties
6 min
74
Shots
1

=== Bronze medal game ===
January 21, 2012; 12:30	Germany	7–4 (2–1, 3–1, 2–2)	Kazakhstan	Tyrolean Ice Arena; Attendance: 789

Game reference

Meike Krimphove
Goalies
Anastassiya Ogay
Referee:
(Slovakia) Zuzana Findurova
Linesmen:
(Italy) Mirjam Gruber
(China) HUI Wang

K. Oertel (P. Szawlowski) (PP) – 8:42	1–0
L. Walz (L. Geelhaar) – 12:21	2–0
	2–1	14:18 – S. Urpekbayeva (M. Ryspek)
	2–2	16:18 – M. Ryspek (PP)
V. Offermann (A. Fiegert) – 17:20	3–2
L. Geelhaar (A. Fiegert) (PP) – 20:21	4–2
K. Oertel (P. Szawlowski) (PP) – 28:16	5–2
	5–3	31:56 – M. Ryspek (S. Urpekbayeva)
V. Offermann – 38:35	6–3
V. Offermann (SH) – 40:17	7–3
	7–4	41:57 – N. Assimova

10 min
Penalties
8 min
50
Shots
9

== Luge ==
Kazakhstan qualified 4 athletes.

Boys

Athlete	Event	Final			
Athlete	Event	Run 1	Run 2	Total	Rank
Segey Korzhnev	Boys' singles	40.236	40.326	1:20.562	14
Stanislav Maltsev; Oleg Faskhutdinov	Boys' doubles	44.007	43.451	1:27.458	10

Girls

Athlete	Event	Final			
Athlete	Event	Run 1	Run 2	Total	Rank
Darya Kudryavtseva	Girls' singles	DNF			

Team

Athlete	Event	Final				
Athlete	Event	Boys'	Girls'	Doubles	Total	Rank
Darya Kudryavtseva; Segey Korzhnev; Stanislav Maltsev; Oleg Faskhutdinov	Mixed Team Relay	45.752	47.401	47.843	2:20.996	8

== Short track ==
Kazakhstan qualified 1 athlete.

Girls

Athlete	Event	Quarterfinals		Semifinals		Finals	
Athlete	Event	Time	Rank	Time	Rank	Time	Rank
Dariya Goncharova	Girls' 500 metres	46.452	3 qCD	48.300	1 qC	46.802	2
Dariya Goncharova	Girls' 1000 metres	1:37.822	2 Q	1:36.487	3 qB	PEN	

Mixed

Athlete	Event	Semifinals		Finals	
Athlete	Event	Time	Rank	Time	Rank
Team G Dariya Goncharova (KAZ); Su Min Yoon (KOR); Arianna Sighel (ITA); Dominic Andermann (AUT)	Mixed Team Relay	4:22.356	3 qB	PEN	

== Ski jumping ==
Kazakhstan qualified 1 athlete.

Boys

Athlete	Event	1st Jump		2nd Jump		Overall	
Athlete	Event	Distance	Points	Distance	Points	Points	Rank
Kanat Khamitov	Boys' individual	44.0m	40.9	39.5m	31.6	72.5	23

== Speed skating ==
Kazakhstan qualified 4 athletes.

Boys

Athlete	Event	Race 1	Race 2	Total	Rank
Dmitriy Morozov	Boys' 500 m	40.24	DNF	-	-
Dmitriy Morozov	Boys' 3000 m			4:22.42	9
Dmitriy Morozov	Boys' Mass Start			7:17.55	11
Stanislav Palkin	Boys' 500 m	39.32	39.12	78.44	5
Stanislav Palkin	Boys' Mass Start			7:13.35	5

Girls

Athlete	Event	Race 1	Race 2	Total	Rank
Svetlana Maltseva	Girls' 500 m	44.56	43.64	88.18	6
Svetlana Maltseva	Girls' Mass Start			LAP	
Yelizaveta Prokhorenko	Girls' 1500 m			2:18.23	11
Yelizaveta Prokhorenko	Girls' 3000 m			5:03.31	11
Yelizaveta Prokhorenko	Girls' Mass Start			6:23.20	17

== See also ==
- Kazakhstan at the 2012 Summer Olympics
