= Belgium at the 2012 Winter Youth Olympics =

- IOC code: BEL
- NOC: Belgian Olympic Committee
- Website: www.teambelgium.be

in Innsbruck
- Competitors: 7 in 5 sports
- Flag bearer: Sebbe De Buck
- Medals Ranked 24th: Gold 0 Silver 1 Bronze 0 Total 1

Winter Youth Olympics appearances (overview)
- 2012; 2016; 2020; 2024

Belgium competed at the 2012 Winter Youth Olympics in Innsbruck, Austria. The Belgian team consisted of 7 athletes and 9 officials. Philippe Preat a former Belgian triathlete served as the Chef De Mission of the team. Belgium concluded the Games with one silver medal, won by Dries Van Den Broecke.

== Medalists ==
Medal	Name	Sport	Event	Date
Silver	Dries Van Den Broecke	Alpine Skiing	Boys' slalom	21 Jan

== Alpine skiing ==
Belgium qualified one boy in alpine skiing.

Boy

Athlete	Event	Run 1	Run 2	Total	Rank
Dries Van Den Broecke	Boys' slalom	39.80	40.46	1:20.26	2nd place, silver medalist(s)
Dries Van Den Broecke	Boys' super-G			DNF	
Dries Van Den Broecke	Boys' combined	DNF			
Dries Van Den Broecke	Boys' giant slalom	1:05.32	55.76	2:01.08	23

== Figure skating ==
Belgium qualified one boy and one girl figure skater.

Athlete(s)	Event	SP		FS		Total	
Athlete(s)	Event	Points	Rank	Points	Rank	Points	Rank
Timothée Manand	Boys'	25.06	16	57.30	15	82.36	16
Lieselotte Swerts	Girls'	30.73	15	54.84	16	85.57	16

== Ice hockey ==
Belgium qualified one girl to compete in the skills challenge competition.

Girl

Athlete(s)	Event	Qualification		Grand final	
Athlete(s)	Event	Points	Rank	Points	Rank
Renée De Wolf	Individual skills	14	10	did not advance	

== Snowboarding ==
Belgium qualified two male athletes in snowboarding.

Athlete	Event	Qualifying			Semifinal			Final		
Athlete	Event	Run 1	Run 2	Rank	Run 1	Run 2	Rank	Run 1	Run 2	Rank
Sebbe De Buck	Boys' halfpipe	76.75	45.50	2 Q				33.50	24.00	12
Sebbe De Buck	Boys' slopestyle	84.25	58.00	2 Q				28.00	43.50	14
Stef Van Deursen	Boys' halfpipe	44.50	47.50	11	did not advance					
Stef Van Deursen	Boys' slopestyle	59.00	42.75	11				did not advance		

== Speed skating ==
Belgium qualified one female athlete.

Girl

Athlete	Event	Race 1	Race 2	Total	Rank
Anne Michiels	Girls' 500 m	45.27	45.68	90.95	10
Anne Michiels	Girls' 3000 m			5:15.04	12
Anne Michiels	Girls' Mass Start			6:21.26	14

== See also ==
- Belgium at the 2012 Summer Olympics
