= Micol Cristini =

Italian figure skater

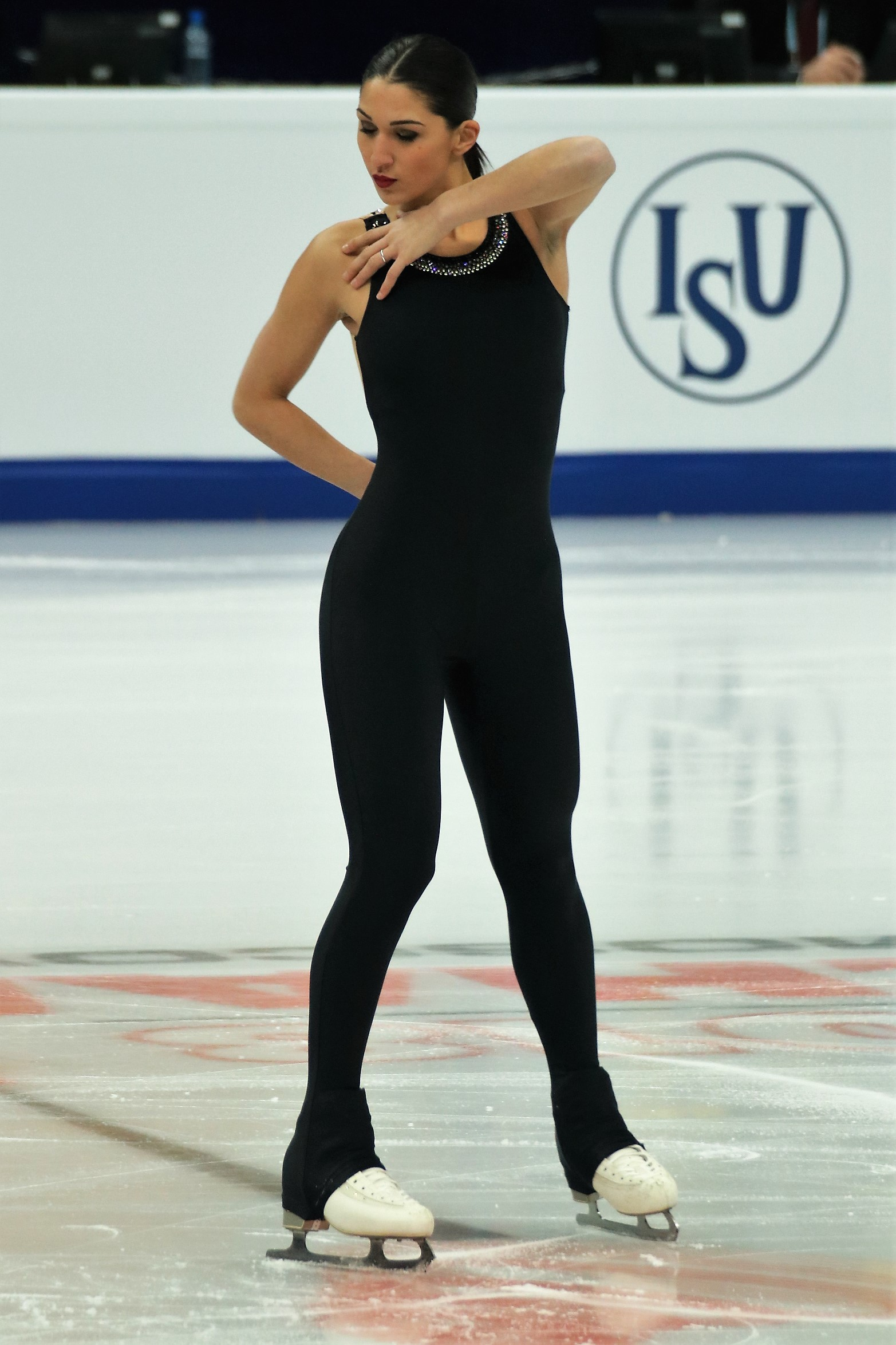

Personal information
- Born: 3 June 1997 (age 29) Bergamo, Italy
- Home town: Urgnano
- Height: 1.65 m (5 ft 5 in)

Figure skating career
- Country: Italy
- Coach: Franca Bianconi, Rosanna Murante
- Skating club: Icelab
- Began skating: 2006

Medal record
Italian Championships
Bronze medal – third place	2015 Turin	Singles

Micol Cristini (born 3 June 1997) is an Italian figure skater. She has won senior international medals, including gold at the 2017 Denkova-Staviski Cup.

== Career ==
=== Early career ===
Micol began learning to skate in 2006. She trained at the Olympic Dream Ice School in Zanica, Province of Bergamo.

She debuted on the ISU Junior Grand Prix series in September 2011, placing 11th in Romania. In January 2012, she competed at the Winter Youth Olympics in Innsbruck, Austria. Ranked 9th in the short program and 12th in the free skate, she finished 11th overall.

=== 2013–2014 season ===
Making her senior international debut, Micol placed fourth at the Golden Spin of Zagreb in December 2013. She placed sixth at the Italian Championships. She trained under Silvia Martina in Zanica.

=== 2014–2015 season ===
Cristini decided to be coached by Franca Bianconi and Rosanna Murante in Sesto San Giovanni. In December 2014, she won her first senior international medal, bronze, at the Denkova-Staviski Cup in Bulgaria. Later in the same month, she stepped onto her first senior national podium, taking bronze at the Italian Championships.

In January 2015, Cristini represented Italy at the 2015 European Championships in Stockholm, Sweden. Ranked 34th in the short program, she did not advance to the free skate.

=== 2015–2016 season ===
Cristini won the silver medal at the Gardena Spring Trophy in April 2016. She did not compete at the Italian Championships.

=== 2016–2017 season ===
Cristini placed fourth at the Italian Championships. She won a bronze medal at the Sofia Trophy in February 2017 and silver the following month at the Cup of Tyrol.

=== 2017–2018 season ===
Cristini received the gold medal at the Denkova-Staviski Cup, held in November in Bulgaria, and bronze at the Italian Championships in December. She qualified to the final segment at the 2018 European Championships, held in January in Moscow, Russia. Ranked 19th in the short program and 11th in the free skate, she finished as the second-best of Italy's three ladies' competitors, 15th overall.

== Programs ==
Season	Short program	Free skating
2017–2018	Rain, In Your Black Eyes by Ezio Bosso	Torn by Nathan Lanier
2016–2017	Hallelujah performed by Alexandra Burke	Notre-Dame de Paris by Riccardo Cocciante
2014–2015	Apasionada performed by William Joseph	The Mission by Ennio Morricone
2013–2014	Beethoven's Nine Secrets by The Piano Guys	Tabarly
2011–2012	Revelations by Carlos Santana	Punch Drunk by Sade

== Competitive highlights ==
CS: Challenger Series; JGP: Junior Grand Prix

International
Event	09–10	10–11	11–12	12–13	13–14	14–15	15–16	16–17	17–18	18–19
Europeans						34th			15th	
CS Finlandia										WD
CS Lombardia								10th	13th	8th
CS Ondrej Nepela								14th		
CS Warsaw Cup						6th				
Challenge Cup									8th	
Cup of Nice								12th	8th	
Cup of Tyrol								2nd		
Denkova-Staviski						3rd			1st	9th
Gardena Trophy							2nd			
Golden Bear								6th		
Golden Spin					4th					
Jégvirág Cup									3rd	
Merano Cup						5th				
Santa Claus Cup									3rd	
Seibt Memorial						7th				
Sofia Trophy								3rd		
Sportland Trophy							12th			
EduSport Trophy										WD
International: Junior
Youth Olympics			11th							
JGP France				14th						
JGP Italy			23rd							
JGP Romania			11th							
JGP Slovakia					11th					
JGP Slovenia						11th				
Challenge Cup					5th					
Cup of Nice				5th						
Denkova-Staviski					3rd					
Dragon Trophy					6th					
Lombardia Trophy						3rd				
Merano Cup					5th					
Mont Blanc		10th								
NRW Trophy				4th						
International: Novice
Gardena	3rd	3rd								
National
Italian Champ.		1st J	5th	6th	6th	3rd		4th	4th	
Levels: N = Advanced novice; J = Junior
