= Mongolia at the 2012 Winter Youth Olympics =

- IOC code: MGL
- NOC: Mongolian National Olympic Committee

in Innsbruck
- Competitors: 2 in 2 sports
- Flag bearer: Dandar Usukhbayar
- Medals: Gold 0 Silver 0 Bronze 0 Total 0

Winter Youth Olympics appearances
- 2012; 2016; 2020; 2024

Mongolia competed at the 2012 Winter Youth Olympics in Innsbruck, Austria. The Mongolian team consisted of two athletes in two different sports.

== Cross country skiing ==
Mongolia qualified one boy cross-country skier.

Boy

Athlete	Event	Final	
Athlete	Event	Time	Rank
Dandar Usukhbayar	10km classical	37:16.0	42

Sprint

Athlete	Event	Qualification		Quarterfinal		Semifinal		Final	
Athlete	Event	Total	Rank	Total	Rank	Total	Rank	Total	Rank
Dandar Usukhbayar	Boys' sprint	2:09.87	48	did not advance					

== Speed skating ==
Mongolia qualified one female athlete.

Girl

Athlete	Event	Race 1	Race 2	Total	Rank
Enkh-Ariun Altantulga	Girls' 500 m	47.12	47.63	94.75	14
Enkh-Ariun Altantulga	Girls' 3000 m			5:25.40	14
Enkh-Ariun Altantulga	Girls' Mass Start			6:38.07	20

== See also ==
- Mongolia at the 2012 Summer Olympics
