= Meril Beilmann =

Estonian biathlete (born 1995)

Personal information
- Nationality: Estonian
- Born: 12 June 1995 (age 29); Tallinn, Estonia

Sport
- Country: Estonia
- Sport: Biathlon

Meril Beilmann (born 12 June 1995) is a former Estonian biathlete. She was born in Tallinn. She has competed in the Biathlon World Cup, and represented Estonia at the Biathlon World Championships 2016.
