= Eisschnelllaufbahn Innsbruck =

Speed skating venue in Innsbruck, Austria

Coordinates: 47°15′25″N 11°24′35″E

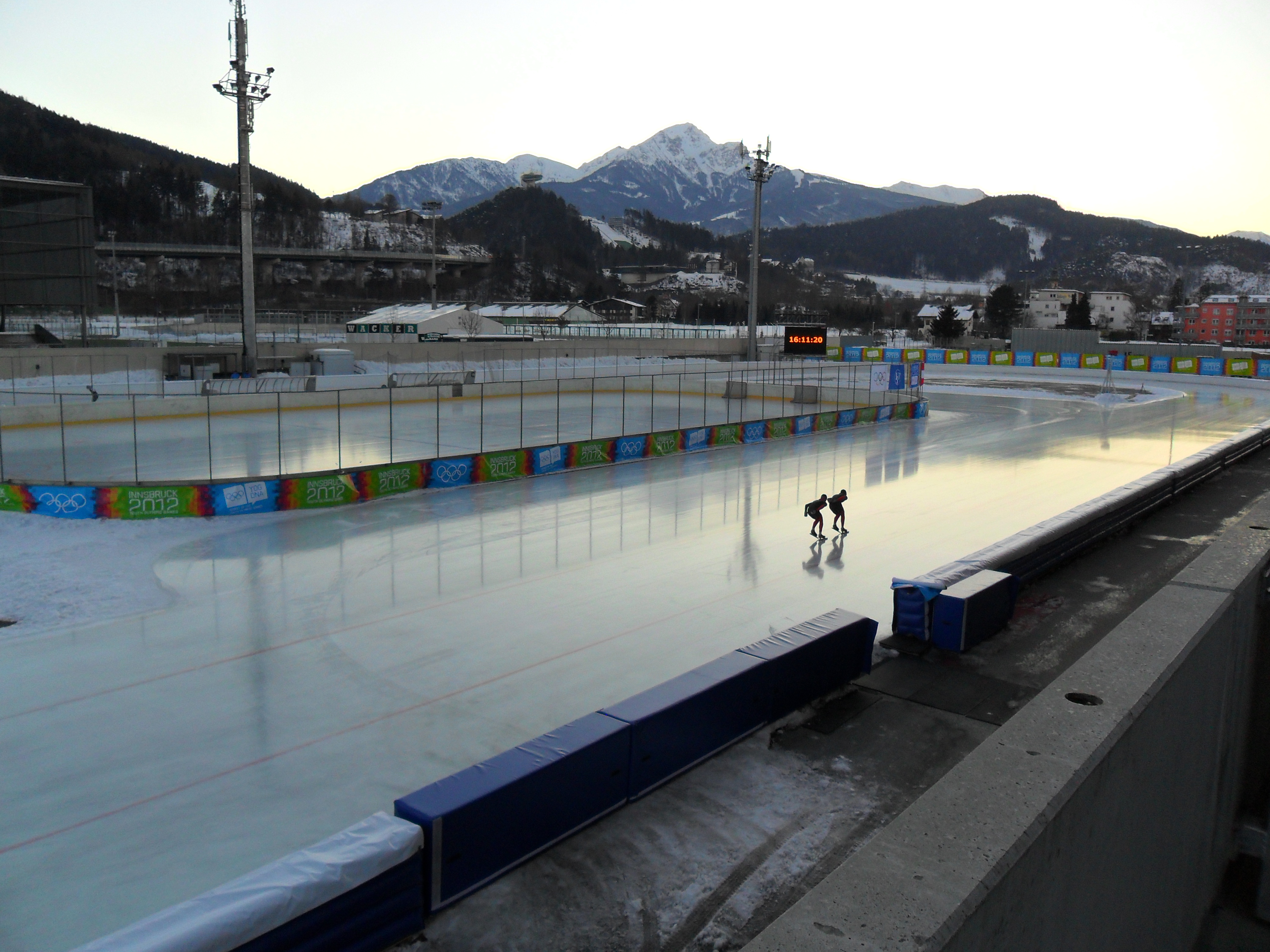
Training at the time of 2012 Youth Winter Olympics

The Olympia Eisschnellaufbahn is a speed skating venue located in Innsbruck, Austria. The outdoor venue hosted the speed skating events both for the 1964 and the 1976 Winter Olympics and the 2012 Winter Youth Olympics.

It is part of the OlympiaWorld Innsbruck consortium that is responsible for maintaining venues that hosted both the 1964 and the 1976 Winter Olympics.
