= Ski jumping at the 2012 Winter Youth Olympics – Mixed team =

Mixed team at the I Winter Youth Olympic Games
- Venue: Toni-Seelos-Olympiaschanze
- Date: 21 January
- Competitors: 39 from 13 nations
- Winning points: 640.1

Medalists
1st place, gold medalist(s)		Katharina Althaus; Tom Lubitz; Andreas Wellinger	Germany
2nd place, silver medalist(s)		Urša Bogataj; Luka Pintarič; Anže Lanišek	Slovenia
3rd place, bronze medalist(s)		Taylor Henrich; Nathaniel Mah; Dusty Korek	Canada

The mixed team competition of the ski jumping events at the 2012 Winter Youth Olympics in Innsbruck, Austria, was held on January 21, at the Toni-Seelos-Olympiaschanze. Each of the 13 teams consists of a female ski jumper, a male Nordic Combined skier and a male ski jumper.

== Results ==
The first round was started on 21 January at 14:30 and the final round at 15:00.

Rank	Bib	Country	Round 1			Final round			Total
Rank	Bib	Country	Distance (m)	Points	Rank	Distance (m)	Points	Rank	Points
1st place, gold medalist(s)	12	Germany; Katharina Althaus; Tom Lubitz; Andreas Wellinger	67.0; 64.0; 65.0	309.8; 108.1; 98.9; 102.8	1	63.0; 67.0; 73.5	330.3; 96.0; 107.1; 127.2	3	640.1
2nd place, silver medalist(s)	11	Slovenia; Urša Bogataj; Luka Pintarič; Anže Lanišek	55.0; 59.0; 65.0	262.5; 73.8; 86.9; 101.8	6	66.0; 66.0; 77.0	348.0; 104.7; 106.7; 136.6	1	610.5
3rd place, bronze medalist(s)	7	Canada; Taylor Henrich; Nathaniel Mah; Dusty Korek	56.0; 64.0; 63.0	277.1; 79.7; 99.4; 98.0	2	54.0; 67.5; 73.5	309.9; 73.4; 110.8; 125.7	4	587.0
4	9	Finland; Jenny Rautionaho; Ilkka Herola; Miika Ylipulli	52.0; 65.0; 67.5	276.2; 64.1; 102.3; 109.8	3	48.5; 71.0; 73.5	302.1; 57.2; 119.2; 125.7	5	578.3
5	13	Japan; Sara Takanashi; Go Yamamoto; Yukiya Satō	57.0; 59.5; 52.0	235.3; 79.6; 87.6; 68.1	8	75.0; 65.0; 67.0	340.7; 129.3; 102.3; 109.1	2	576.0
6	10	Norway; Karoline Røstad; Harald Johnas Riiber; Mats Søhagen Berggaard	49.0; 66.0; 67.0	271.2; 57.4; 105.7; 108.1	5	49.0; 68.0; 77.5	301.2; 56.4; 109.0; 135.8	6	572.4
7	6	Austria; Michaela Kranzl; Paul Gerstgraser; Elias Tollinger	44.5; 64.0; 72.0	272.1; 48.6; 99.9; 123.6	4	42.5; 66.5; 75.0	276.0; 42.8; 104.9; 128.3	9	548.1
8	8	Czech Republic; Natálie Dejmková; Tomáš Portyk; Tomáš Friedrich	48.0; 60.0; 63.0	239.3; 53.0; 89.8; 96.5	7	45.5; 73.0; 73.5	298.2; 46.5; 125.5; 126.2	7	537.5
9	4	France; Léa Lemare; Tom Balland; Arthur Royer	56.5; 52.0; 56.0	227.2; 80.9; 69.1; 77.2	9	56.5; 62.5; 67.0	283.3; 81.4; 93.8; 108.1	8	510.5
10	5	Italy; Veronica Gianmoena; Raffaele Buzzi; Daniele Varesco	42.0; 59.5; 64.5	222.8; 35.1; 86.6; 101.1	10	43.0; 69.0; 69.0	266.8; 40.5; 112.9; 113.4	10	489.6
11	2	United States; Emilee Anderson; Colton Kissel; William Rhoads	44.5; 57.0; 58.0	205.7; 44.1; 78.6; 83.0	12	44.5; 61.0; 63.5	230.5; 44.1; 90.2; 96.2	11	436.2
12	3	Poland; Magdalena Pałasz; Michał Pytel; Krysztof Leja	40.0; 59.0; 62.0	210.8; 31.8; 84.9; 94.1	11	36.5; 61.0; 65.0	215.4; 23.4; 90.7; 101.3	12	426.2
13	1	Russia; Anastasia Veshchikova; Roman Terekhin; Yury Samsonov	47.0; 48.5; 53.5	180.5; 54.6; 57.7; 68.2	13	39.0; 54.0; 62.5	178.1; 31.4; 72.4; 74.3	13	358.6
