= United States at the 2012 Winter Youth Olympics =

- Flag of the United States
- IOC code: USA
- NOC: United States Olympic Committee
- Website: www.teamusa.org

in Innsbruck
- Competitors: 57 in 15 sports
- Flag bearer: Jake Peterson
- Medals Ranked 10th: Gold 2 Silver 3 Bronze 3 Total 8

Winter Youth Olympics appearances (overview)
- 2012; 2016; 2020; 2024

The United States competed at the 2012 Winter Youth Olympics in Innsbruck, Austria.

== Medalists ==
| Medal | Name | Sport | Event | Date |
|---|---|---|---|---|
| Gold | Ben Ferguson | Snowboarding | Boys' halfpipe | January 15 |
| Gold | Summer Britcher; Tucker West; Ty Andersen; Pat Edmunds | Luge | Mixed team relay | January 17 |
| Gold | Shoma Uno (JPN); Jordan Bauth (USA); Eugenia Tkachenka / Yuri Hulitski (BLR) | Figure skating | Mixed NOC team | January 21 |
| Silver | Arielle Gold | Snowboarding | Girls' halfpipe | January 15 |
| Silver | Ben Ferguson | Snowboarding | Boys' slopestyle | January 19 |
| Silver | Arielle Gold | Snowboarding | Girls' slopestyle | January 19 |
| Bronze | Aaron Blunck | Freestyle skiing | Boys' halfpipe | January 15 |
| Bronze | Ty Andersen; Pat Edmunds | Luge | Boys' doubles | January 16 |
| Bronze | Anna Kubek; Heather Mooney; Sean Doherty; Patrick Caldwell | Cross-country skiing Biathlon | Cross-country Biathlon mixed relay | January 21 |
| Bronze | Korey Dropkin (USA); Marina Verenich (RUS) | Curling | Mixed doubles | January 22 |

== Alpine skiing ==
The United States sent a maximum of two athletes to compete in the alpine skiing event, one male and one female athlete.

| Athlete | Event | Run 1 | Run 2 | Total | Rank |
|---|---|---|---|---|---|
| Alex Leever | Boys' super-G | 1:06.33 | | 1:06.33 | 16 |
| Alex Leever | Boys' combined | 1:05.98 | 37.36 | 1:43.34 | 10 |
| Alex Leever | Boys' giant slalom | 59.89 | 56.09 | 1:55.98 | 11 |
| Alex Leever | Boys' slalom | 40.44 | DNF | – | – |
| Julia Mueller-Ristine | Girls' super-G | | | DNF | |
| Julia Mueller-Ristine | Girls' combined | 1:07.93 | 40.17 | 1:48.10 | 17 |
| Julia Mueller-Ristine | Girls' giant slalom | 1:01.86 | 1:01.31 | 2:03.17 | 24 |
| Julia Mueller-Ristine | Girls' slalom | 46.48 | 41.31 | 1:27.79 | 12 |

== Biathlon ==
The United States qualified two male and two female biathletes.

Individual

| Athlete | Event | Time | Penalties | Rank |
|---|---|---|---|---|
| Sean Doherty | Boys' sprint | 20:47.5 | 3 | 12 |
| Sean Doherty | Boys' pursuit | 31:44.3 | 8 | 14 |
| Nick Proell | Boys' sprint | 22:21.8 | 2 | 32 |
| Nick Proell | Boys' pursuit | 36:03.6 | 8 | 40 |
| Anna Kubek | Girls' sprint | 18:56.7 | 1 | 13 |
| Anna Kubek | Girls' pursuit | 30:28.5 | 3 | 10 |
| Aleksandra Zakrzewska | Girls' sprint | 21:21.8 | 4 | 39 |
| Aleksandra Zakrzewska | Girls' pursuit | 37:18.6 | 10 | 41 |

Mixed

| Athletes | Event | Time | Penalties | Rank |
|---|---|---|---|---|
| Anna Kubek; Aleksandra Zakrzewska; Nick Proell; Sean Doherty | Mixed relay | 1:20:03.4 | 20 | 14 |
| Anna Kubek; Heather Mooney; Sean Doherty; Patrick Caldwell | Cross-country Biathlon mixed relay | 1:05:23.0 | 5 | 3rd place, bronze medalist(s) |

== Bobsleigh ==
The United States sent a pair of athletes to compete in the two-man bobsled event.

| Athlete | Event | Run 1 | Run 2 | Total | Rank |
|---|---|---|---|---|---|
| Cody Bascue; Jake Peterson | Two-boys | 54.98 | 54.67 | 1:49.65 | 7 |

== Cross country skiing ==
The United States qualified one male and one female cross-country skier.

Individual

| Athlete | Event | Quarterfinals | | Semifinals | | Final | |
| Athlete | Event | Time | Rank | Time | Rank | Time | Rank |
|---|---|---|---|---|---|---|---|
| Patrick Caldwell | Boys' 10 km classical | | | | | 31:30.1 | 16 |
| Patrick Caldwell | Boys' sprint | 1:46.5 | 4 Q (LL) | 1:47.3 | 3 Q (LL) | 1:47.0 | 5 |
| Heather Mooney | Girls' 5 km classical | | | | | 16:18.8 | 13 |
| Heather Mooney | Girls' sprint | 2:09.6 | 5 | did not advance | | | |

Notes

- LL – Lucky loser; lucky losers in the cross country skiing sprint competitions qualified for the next round by posting the best heat times among the third and fourth placed competitors in that round.

Mixed

| Athletes | Event | Final | |
| Athletes | Event | Time | Rank |
|---|---|---|---|
| Anna Kubek; Heather Mooney; Sean Doherty; Patrick Caldwell | Cross-country Biathlon mixed relay | 1:05:23.0 | 3rd place, bronze medalist(s) |

== Curling ==
The United States qualified a mixed team of two junior men and two junior women. The team representing the United States was decided at the Youth Olympic Games playdown in Grafton, North Dakota.

=== Mixed team ===
Team

Skip: Korey Dropkin
Third: Sarah Anderson
Second: Thomas Howell
Lead: Taylor Anderson

==== Standings ====
Key
| Teams to Playoffs |
| Teams to Tiebreakers |

Final Round Robin Standings

| Blue Group | Skip | W | L |
|---|---|---|---|
| United States | Korey Dropkin | 7 | 0 |
| Switzerland | Michael Brunner | 6 | 1 |
| Czech Republic | Marek Černovský | 4 | 3 |
| China | Bai Yang | 3 | 4 |
| Norway | Markus Skogvold | 3 | 4 |
| South Korea | Kang Sue-yeon | 2 | 5 |
| New Zealand | Luke Steele | 2 | 5 |
| Estonia | Robert-Kent Päll | 1 | 6 |

==== Round-robin results ====
Draw 1

| Sheet C | 1 | 2 | 3 | 4 | 5 | 6 | 7 | 8 | Final |
| Estonia (Päll) | 0 | 0 | 0 | 0 | 1 | 0 | X | X | 1 |
| United States (Dropkin) 🔨 | 2 | 2 | 1 | 4 | 0 | 1 | X | X | 10 |

Draw 2

| Sheet A | 1 | 2 | 3 | 4 | 5 | 6 | 7 | 8 | Final |
| New Zealand (Steele) | 0 | 0 | 0 | 1 | 0 | 1 | X | X | 2 |
| United States (Dropkin) 🔨 | 2 | 2 | 1 | 0 | 5 | 0 | X | X | 10 |

Draw 3

| Sheet C | 1 | 2 | 3 | 4 | 5 | 6 | 7 | 8 | Final |
| United States (Dropkin) 🔨 | 2 | 0 | 0 | 0 | 1 | 0 | 4 | X | 7 |
| South Korea (Kang) | 0 | 0 | 2 | 1 | 0 | 1 | 0 | X | 4 |

Draw 4

| Sheet D | 1 | 2 | 3 | 4 | 5 | 6 | 7 | 8 | Final |
| United States (Dropkin) 🔨 | 2 | 0 | 1 | 0 | 0 | 2 | 0 | 1 | 6 |
| Switzerland (Brunner) | 0 | 2 | 0 | 1 | 0 | 0 | 1 | 0 | 4 |

Draw 5

| Sheet B | 1 | 2 | 3 | 4 | 5 | 6 | 7 | 8 | Final |
| Czech Republic (Černovský) | 0 | 0 | 0 | 0 | 1 | 0 | X | X | 1 |
| United States (Dropkin) 🔨 | 2 | 4 | 2 | 2 | 0 | 1 | X | X | 11 |

Draw 6

| Sheet D | 1 | 2 | 3 | 4 | 5 | 6 | 7 | 8 | Final |
| Norway (Skogvold) 🔨 | 1 | 0 | 1 | 0 | 1 | 0 | 0 | X | 3 |
| United States (Dropkin) | 0 | 2 | 0 | 2 | 0 | 1 | 1 | X | 6 |

Draw 7

| Sheet A | 1 | 2 | 3 | 4 | 5 | 6 | 7 | 8 | Final |
| United States (Dropkin) | 1 | 1 | 4 | 0 | 1 | 1 | X | X | 8 |
| China (Bai) 🔨 | 0 | 0 | 0 | 1 | 0 | 0 | X | X | 1 |

==== Playoffs ====
Quarterfinals

| Sheet B | 1 | 2 | 3 | 4 | 5 | 6 | 7 | 8 | Final |
| Italy (Mosaner) 🔨 | 0 | 0 | 1 | 4 | 0 | 2 | 0 | X | 7 |
| United States (Dropkin) | 0 | 0 | 0 | 0 | 2 | 0 | 3 | X | 5 |

Final place: 5

=== Mixed doubles ===
Teams

Second: Sarah Anderson (USA)
Lead: Go Ke-on (KOR)

Second: Korey Dropkin (USA)
Lead: Marina Verenich (RUS)

Second: Yang Ying (CHN)
Lead: Thomas Howell (USA)

Second: Duncan Menzies (GBR)
Lead: Taylor Anderson (USA)

==== Results ====
| Athletes | Round of 32 | Round of 16 | Quarterfinals | Semifinals | Final | Rank |
|---|---|---|---|---|---|---|
| Sarah Anderson (USA); Go Ke-on (KOR) | Brunner (SUI); Muskatewitz (GER); L 6–8 | did not advance | | | | |
| Korey Dropkin (USA); Marina Verenich (RUS) | Stern (SUI); Rõuk (EST); W 13–3 | Steele (NZL); Heldin (SWE); W 10–3 | Brown (CAN); Reichel (AUT); W 9–3 | Brunner (SUI); Muskatewitz (GER); L 3–7 | Bronze medal final Yoo (KOR); Tamakuma (JPN); W 6–5 | 3rd place, bronze medalist(s) |
| Yang Ying (CHN); Thomas Howell (USA) | Genner (AUT); Gisler (SUI); W 10–2 | Sesaker (NOR); Kim (KOR); L 4–10 | did not advance | | | |
| Duncan Menzies (GBR); Taylor Anderson (USA) | Adviento (NZL); Meier (SUI); W 8–7 | Wranå (SWE); Zirk (EST); W 6–4 | Yoo (KOR); Tamakuma (JPN); L 4–7 | did not advance | | |

===== Round of 32 =====
| Sheet A | 1 | 2 | 3 | 4 | 5 | 6 | 7 | 8 | Final |
| Michael Brunner (SUI); Nicole Muskatewitz (GER) 🔨 | 0 | 2 | 0 | 2 | 0 | 2 | 1 | 1 | 8 |
| Sarah Anderson (USA); Go Ke-on (KOR) | 1 | 0 | 4 | 0 | 1 | 0 | 0 | 0 | 6 |

| Sheet A | 1 | 2 | 3 | 4 | 5 | 6 | 7 | 8 | Final |
| Elena Stern (SUI); Sander Rõuk (EST) 🔨 | 2 | 0 | 0 | 0 | 1 | 0 | X | X | 3 |
| Korey Dropkin (USA); Marina Verenich (RUS) | 0 | 2 | 1 | 4 | 0 | 6 | X | X | 13 |

| Sheet A | 1 | 2 | 3 | 4 | 5 | 6 | 7 | 8 | Final |
| Mathias Genner (AUT); Lisa Gisler (SUI) | 0 | 0 | 0 | 1 | 0 | 1 | 0 | X | 2 |
| Yang Ying (CHN); Thomas Howell (USA) 🔨 | 3 | 1 | 2 | 0 | 3 | 0 | 1 | X | 10 |

| Sheet A | 1 | 2 | 3 | 4 | 5 | 6 | 7 | 8 | 9 | Final |
| Eleanor Adviento (NZL); Romano Meier (SUI) 🔨 | 2 | 0 | 1 | 0 | 1 | 0 | 3 | 0 | 0 | 7 |
| Duncan Menzies (GBR); Taylor Anderson (USA) | 0 | 1 | 0 | 2 | 0 | 2 | 0 | 2 | 1 | 8 |

===== Round of 16 =====
| Sheet C | 1 | 2 | 3 | 4 | 5 | 6 | 7 | 8 | Final |
| Korey Dropkin (USA); Marina Verenich (RUS) 🔨 | 1 | 0 | 5 | 0 | 1 | 2 | 1 | X | 10 |
| Luke Steele (NZL); Johanna Heldin (SWE) | 0 | 1 | 0 | 2 | 0 | 0 | 0 | X | 3 |

| Sheet D | 1 | 2 | 3 | 4 | 5 | 6 | 7 | 8 | Final |
| Duncan Menzies (GBR); Taylor Anderson (USA) 🔨 | 1 | 0 | 0 | 2 | 1 | 0 | 0 | 2 | 6 |
| Rasmus Wranå (SWE); Kerli Zirk (EST) | 0 | 1 | 1 | 0 | 0 | 1 | 1 | 0 | 4 |

| Sheet D | 1 | 2 | 3 | 4 | 5 | 6 | 7 | 8 | Final |
| Yang Ying (CHN); Thomas Howell (USA) | 0 | 3 | 0 | 0 | 0 | 1 | 0 | X | 4 |
| Martin Sesaker (NOR); Kim Eun-bi (KOR) 🔨 | 2 | 0 | 2 | 1 | 2 | 0 | 3 | X | 10 |

===== Quarterfinals =====
| Sheet C | 1 | 2 | 3 | 4 | 5 | 6 | 7 | 8 | Final |
| Duncan Menzies (GBR); Taylor Anderson (USA) 🔨 | 1 | 0 | 0 | 1 | 0 | 1 | 1 | 0 | 4 |
| Yoo Min-hyeon (KOR); Mako Tamakuma (JPN) | 0 | 2 | 1 | 0 | 3 | 0 | 0 | 1 | 7 |

| Sheet D | 1 | 2 | 3 | 4 | 5 | 6 | 7 | 8 | Final |
| Korey Dropkin (USA); Marina Verenich (RUS) | 1 | 2 | 2 | 0 | 4 | 0 | 0 | X | 9 |
| Corryn Brown (CAN); Martin Reichel (AUT) 🔨 | 0 | 0 | 0 | 1 | 0 | 1 | 1 | X | 3 |

===== Semifinals =====
| Sheet A | 1 | 2 | 3 | 4 | 5 | 6 | 7 | 8 | Final |
| Michael Brunner (SUI); Nicole Muskatewitz (GER) | 1 | 1 | 0 | 2 | 0 | 3 | 0 | X | 7 |
| Korey Dropkin (USA); Marina Verenich (RUS) 🔨 | 0 | 0 | 1 | 0 | 1 | 0 | 1 | X | 3 |

===== Bronze Medal Game =====
| Sheet B | 1 | 2 | 3 | 4 | 5 | 6 | 7 | 8 | 9 | Final |
| Korey Dropkin (USA); Marina Verenich (RUS) 🔨 | 1 | 0 | 1 | 0 | 2 | 0 | 1 | 0 | 1 | 6 |
| Yoo Min-hyeon (KOR); Mako Tamakuma (JPN) | 0 | 1 | 0 | 1 | 0 | 1 | 0 | 2 | 0 | 5 |

== Figure skating ==
The United States qualified a total of three singles skaters and three skating pairs. However, there were only one athlete in girls' singles, one pair team in pair skating, and two pairs teams in ice dancing. Originally, the United States had received a quota spot in the boys' singles competition and an additional quota spot in the girls' singles competition, but U.S. Figure Skating announced that those spots will not be filled.

Individual/Pairs

| Athlete | Event | SP/OD | | FS/FD | | Total | Rank |
| Athlete | Event | Points | Rank | Points | Rank | Total | Rank |
|---|---|---|---|---|---|---|---|
| Jordan Bauth | Girls' singles | 42.33 | 7 | 81.06 | 7 | 123.39 | 7 |
| Caitlin Belt; Michael Johnson | Pair skating | 38.65 | 4 | 70.96 | 4 | 109.61 | 4 |
| Rachel Parsons; Michael Parsons | Ice dancing | 44.69 | 4 | 69.53 | 4 | 114.22 | 4 |

Mixed NOC

| Athlete | Event | Men (M) | | Women (W) | | Ice dance (ID) | | Total Points | Final Rank |
| Athlete | Event | Score | Points | Score | Points | Score | Points | Total Points | Final Rank |
|---|---|---|---|---|---|---|---|---|---|
| M: Shoma Uno (JPN); W: Jordan Bauth (USA); ID: Eugenia Tkachenka / Yuri Hulitski (BLR) | Mixed NOC team | 112.72 | 7 | 77.84 | 7 | 44.36 | 2 | 16 | 1st place, gold medalist(s) |

== Freestyle skiing ==
The United States has qualified two male and two female skiers, one each in the half-pipe and ski cross categories for each gender.

Half-pipe

| Athlete | Event | Qualification | | Final | |
| Athlete | Event | Points | Rank | Points | Rank |
|---|---|---|---|---|---|
| Aaron Blunck | Boys' halfpipe | 75.75 | 3 Q | 87.50 | 3rd place, bronze medalist(s) |
| Jeanne Crane-Mauzy | Girls' halfpipe | DNS | – | did not advance | |

Ski cross

| Athlete | Event | Qualification | | Quarterfinals | | Semifinals | | Final | |
| Athlete | Event | Time | Rank | Time | Rank | Time | Rank | Time | Rank |
|---|---|---|---|---|---|---|---|---|---|
| Lesley Wilson | Girls' ski cross | 1:02.64 | 10 | Cancelled | | | | | 10 |

== Ice hockey ==
The United States sent one boys' ice hockey team consisting of 17 athletes.

=== Team ===
The team roster is listed as follows:

| No. | Pos. | 2012 Winter Youth Olympics United States U-16 boys' ice hockey team roster | Height | Weight | Birthdate | Hometown | Current Team |
|---|---|---|---|---|---|---|---|
| 30 | G | Logan Halladay | 185 cm (6 ft 1 in) | 79 kg (174 lb) | 17 August 1996 | Cary, North Carolina | Carolina Jr. Hurricanes (NAPAL) |
| 1 | G | Edwin Minney | 193 cm (6 ft 4 in) | 88 kg (194 lb) | 29 March 1996 | Wind Gap, Pennsylvania | DC Capitals (TIER-1 ELITE) |
| 3 | D | Adam Baughman | 188 cm (6 ft 2 in) | 79 kg (174 lb) | 3 January 1996 | Chicago, Illinois | Chicago Mission (HPHL) |
| 2 | D | Nathan Billitier | 180 cm (5 ft 11 in) | 82 kg (181 lb) | 20 March 1996 | Spencerport, New York | Rochester Stars (EJHL) |
| 4 | D | Ryan Bliss – A | 185 cm (6 ft 1 in) | 84 kg (185 lb) | 22 June 1996 | Bedford, New Hampshire | St. Paul's School |
| 5 | D | Jack Glover | 188 cm (6 ft 2 in) | 77 kg (170 lb) | 17 May 1996 | Golden Valley, Minnesota | Benilde-St. Margaret's School |
| 6 | D | Joshua Jacobs – A | 185 cm (6 ft 1 in) | 78 kg (172 lb) | 15 February 1996 | Shelby Township, Michigan | Detroit Honeybaked (HPHL) |
| 8 | D | Kevin Kerr | 180 cm (5 ft 11 in) | 70 kg (150 lb) | 9 February 1996 | Bensalem, Pennsylvania | Team Comcast (TIER-1 ELITE) |
| 10 | F | Blake Clarke | 187 cm (6 ft 2 in) | 88 kg (194 lb) | 24 January 1996 | Wildwood, Missouri | Fargo Force (USHL) |
| 12 | F | Jack Eichel | 185 cm (6 ft 1 in) | 79 kg (174 lb) | 28 October 1996 | North Chelmsford, Massachusetts | Boston Jr. Bruins (EJHL) |
| 11 | F | Jared Fiegl – C | 183 cm (6 ft 0 in) | 86 kg (190 lb) | 23 January 1996 | Parker, Colorado | Colorado Rampage (TIER-1 ELITE) |
| 9 | F | Shane Gersich | 180 cm (5 ft 11 in) | 74 kg (163 lb) | 10 July 1996 | Chaska, Minnesota | Holy Family Catholic High School |
| 18 | F | Marcel Godbout – C | 179 cm (5 ft 10 in) | 82 kg (181 lb) | 4 June 1996 | Center Line, Michigan | Shattuck St. Mary's School |
| 15 | F | Nicholas Magyar | 190 cm (6 ft 3 in) | 79 kg (174 lb) | 29 May 1996 | Mentor, Ohio | Cleveland Jr. Barons |
| 14 | F | Ryan MacInnis | 191 cm (6 ft 3 in) | 77 kg (170 lb) | 14 February 1996 | St. Louis, Missouri | St. Louis Amateur Blues (TIER-1 ELITE) |
| 16 | F | Nick Schmaltz | 180 cm (5 ft 11 in) | 75 kg (165 lb) | 23 February 1996 | Verona, Wisconsin | Chicago Mission (HPHL) |
| 17 | F | Joe Wegwerth | 188 cm (6 ft 2 in) | 86 kg (190 lb) | 16 June 1996 | Brewster, New York | Brewster Bulldogs (EJHL) |

Coaching staff

Head Coach: Ben Smith
Athletic Trainer: Stan Wong

=== Results ===
==== Preliminary round ====
Legend
| Teams to Playoffs |

| Team | GP | W | OTW | OTL | L | GF | GA | Diff | PTS |
|---|---|---|---|---|---|---|---|---|---|
| Russia | 4 | 3 | 0 | 0 | 1 | 25 | 9 | +16 | 9 |
| Canada | 4 | 2 | 1 | 0 | 1 | 20 | 7 | +13 | 8 |
| Finland | 4 | 2 | 0 | 1 | 1 | 13 | 11 | +2 | 7 |
| United States | 4 | 2 | 0 | 0 | 2 | 14 | 18 | –4 | 6 |
| Austria | 4 | 0 | 0 | 0 | 4 | 3 | 30 | –27 | 0 |

| 14 January; 12:30 | United States | 7 – 2 (4–0, 1–1, 2–1) | Austria | Tyrolean Ice Arena; Attendance: 1,180 |

Game reference

Edwin Minney
Goalies
Stefan Müller
Referee:
(Latvia) Andris Ansons
Linesmen:
(Slovenia) Tilen Pahor
(Sweden) Daniel Persson

| Gersich (Godbout, NSchmaltz) – 0:47 | 1–0 |
| Wegwerth (Eichel, Clarke) – 1:13 | 2–0 |
| MacInnis (Magyar, Baughman) (PP) – 9:02 | 3–0 |
| Gersich (Eichel) (PP) – 12:03 | 4–0 |
| | 4–1 | 20:40 – Huber |
| Gersich (Billitier) – 23:37 | 5–1 |
| | 5–2 | 30:44 – Gaffal (Kraus, Huber) |
| MacInnis (Godbout, Jacobs) (SH) – 41:06 | 6–2 |
| Godbout (Schmaltz) (SH) – 41:24 | 7–2 |

14 min
Penalties
10 min
42
Shots
16

| 15 January; 18:00 | Canada | 5 – 1 (1–0, 2–1, 2–0) | United States | Tyrolean Ice Arena; Attendance: 2,575 |

Game reference

Kevin Bouchard
Goalies
Logan Halladay
Referee:
(Germany) Simon Aicher
Linesmen:
(Belarus) Andrei Haurylenka
(Slovenia) Tilen Pahor

| Cornel – 3:58 | 1–0 |
| Gropp (Cornel) – 16:30 | 2–0 |
| | 2–1 | 17:39 – Clarke (Jacobs) |
| Duke (Brooks, Pilon) – 28:54 | 3–1 |
| Brooks (Martin, Gardiner) (PP) – 43:21 | 4–1 |
| Gropp (Cornel, Gardiner) (PP) – 44:06 | 5–1 |

2 min
Penalties
10 min
27
Shots
16

| 17 January; 15:45 | Finland | 4 – 5 (1–0, 2–3, 1–2) | United States | Tyrolean Ice Arena; Attendance: 1,824 |

Game reference

Jusso Kannel
Goalies
Edwin Minney
Referees:
(Latvia) Andris Ansons

Linesmen:
(Slovenia) Tilen Pahor
(Austria) Martin Smeibidlo

| Kiviranta (Hopponen, Tuulola) – 12:16 | 1–0 |
| | 1–1 | 16:31 – Baughman (Schmaltz) |
| Tuulola (Kiviranta, Pitkanen) – 19:45 | 2–1 |
| | 2–2 | 23:10 – Glover (Bliss) (PP) |
| Kauppinen (Hopponen, Levanen) – 24:36 | 3–2 |
| | 3–3 | 27:47 – Clarke (Kerr) |
| | 3–4 | 31:01 – Schmaltz (Bliss, Fiegl) |
| | 3–5 | 32:15 – MacInnis (Gersich, Magyar) |
| Kapanen (Haapanen) – 41:45 | 4–5 |

10 min
Penalties
26 min
29
Shots
32

| 18 January; 16:15 | United States | 1 – 7 (0–2, 0–3, 1–2) | Russia | Tyrolean Ice Arena; Attendance: 2,124 |

Game reference

Edwin Minney
Goalies
Sergey Korobov
Referee:
(Germany) Simon Aicher
Linesmen:
(Germany) Benjamin Hoppe
(Sweden) Daniel Persson

| | 0–1 | 1:43 – E. Orlov (E. Svechnikov, A. Protapovich (PP) |
| | 0–2 | 6:47 – A. Mikulovich (I. Nikolishin, D. Sergeev) (PP) |
| | 0–3 | 16:24 – S. Kondratyev (A. Svetlakov) |
| | 0–4 | 19:32 – E. Svechnikov (M. Lazarev, A. Protapovich) (PP) |
| | 0–5 | 21:58 – M. Lazarev (E. Svechnikov) |
| J. Fiegl (R. MacInnis, J. Wegwerth) – 38:17 | 1–5 |
| | 1–6 | 40:30 – M. Lazarev (E. Svechnikov) |
| | 1–7 | 43:32 – E. Nasybullin (E. Orlov, A. Protapovich) (PP) |

16 min
Penalties
4 min
15
Shots
30

==== Playoffs ====
===== Semifinals =====
| 20 January; 14:15 | Russia | 5 – 2 (1–0, 1–0, 3–2) | United States | Tyrolean Ice Arena; Attendance: 1,632 |

Game reference

Sergey Korobov
Goalies
Logan Halladay
Referee:
(Sweden) Andreas Harnebring
Linesmen:
(Belarus) Andrei Haurylenka
(Sweden) Daniel Persson

| Orlov (Nasybullin, Protapovich) (PP) – 2:06 | 1–0 |
| Nikolishin (Nekolenko) – 28:01 | 2–0 |
| Zinovev (Mikulovich, Nikolishin) – 31:03 | 3–0 |
| Nekolenko (Nikolishin, Sergeev) – 32:49 | 4–0 |
| | 4–1 | 40:06 – Wegwerth (Eichel) |
| | 4–2 | 41:22 – Eichel (Glover) (PP) |
| Svechnikov – 44:37 | 5–2 |

14 min
Penalties
8 min
16
Shots
32

===== Bronze medal game =====
| January 21, 2012; 14:45 | Canada | 7 – 5 (3–1, 4–1, 0–3) | United States | Tyrolean Ice Arena; Attendance: 1,592 |

Keven Bouchard
Goalies
Logan Halladay
Referee:
(Norway) Stian Halm
Linesmen:
(Germany) Benjamin Hoppe
(Austria) Martin Smeibidlo

| E. Cornel (R. Gardiner, J. Hicketts) (PP) – 4:19 | 1–0 |
| R. Pilon (R. Gardiner, E. Cornel) – 6:58 | 2–0 |
| R. Gropp (R. Gardiner, R. Pilon) (PP) – 13:22 | 3–0 |
| | 3–1 | 14:53 – N. Billitier (A. Baughman) |
| | 3–2 | 19:40 – R. MacInnis (J. Eichel) |
| A. Brooks (R. Duke, B. Martin) – 21:27 | 4–2 |
| R. Gardiner (J. Hicketts) – 22:35 | 5–2 |
| R. Gropp – 23:10 | 6–2 |
| R. Gropp (R. Gardiner) – 25:40 | 7–2 |
| | 7–3 | 31:44 – J. Eichel (N. Schmaltz) |
| | 7–4 | 38:54 – N. Magyar (J. Jacobs, J. Wegwerth) |
| | 7–5 | 40:10 – N. Schmaltz (R. MacInnis, M. Godbout) (PP) |

8 min
Penalties
12 min
19
Shots
40

Final rank: 4

== Luge ==
The United States qualified three male and two female lugers.

| Athlete | Event | Run 1 | | Run 2 | | Run 3 | | Total | Rank |
| Athlete | Event | Time | Rank | Time | Rank | Time | Rank | Total | Rank |
|---|---|---|---|---|---|---|---|---|---|
| Ty Andersen | Boys' singles | 40.374 | 17 | 40.210 | 13 | | | 1:20.584 | 15 |
| Tucker West | Boys' singles | 40.218 | 12 | 40.117 | 10 | | | 1:20.335 | 12 |
| Ty Andersen; Pat Edmunds | Doubles | 42.817 | 3 | 42.949 | 4 | | | 1:25.766 | 3rd place, bronze medalist(s) |
| Summer Britcher | Girls' singles | 40.321 | 5 | 40.309 | 3 | | | 1:20.630 | 5 |
| Raychel Germaine | Girls' singles | 40.856 | 12 | 41.324 | 18 | | | 1:22.180 | 14 |
| Summer Britcher; Tucker West; Ty Andersen; Pat Edmunds | Mixed Team Relay | 44.658 | 1 | 46.686 | 1 | 46.966 | 1 | 2:18.310 | 1st place, gold medalist(s) |

== Nordic combined ==
The United States qualified one athlete in Nordic combined.

| Athlete | Event | Ski jump | | | Cross-country | | Final | |
| Athlete | Event | Distance | Score | Rank | Time | Rank | Time | Rank |
|---|---|---|---|---|---|---|---|---|
| Colton Kissell | Individual | 67.5m | 105.3 | 13 | 29:11.6 | 15 | 32:00.6 | 13 |

== Short track speed skating ==
The United States qualified one male and one female short track speed skater.

Individual

| Athlete | Event | Quarterfinals | | Semifinals | | Finals | |
| Athlete | Event | Time | Rank | Time | Rank | Time | Rank |
|---|---|---|---|---|---|---|---|
| Thomas Hong | Boys' 500 metres | 44.485 | 1 Q | 43.187 | 2 Q | 42.782 | 4 |
| Thomas Hong | Boys' 1000 metres | 1:30.615 | 2 Q | DNF | – | did not advance | |
| Sarah Warren | Girls' 500 metres | 48.241 | 1 Q | 47.033 | 4 qB | 48.273 | 4 |
| Sarah Warren | Girls' 1000 metres | 1:40.397 | 4 | 1:45.006 | 2 QC | 1:50.026 | 11 |

Mixed

| Athlete | Event | Semifinals | | Finals | |
| Athlete | Event | Time | Rank | Time | Rank |
|---|---|---|---|---|---|
| Team D Elisabeth Witt (GER); Thomas Insuk Hong (USA); Sumire Kikuchi (JPN); Yin-Cheng Chang (TPE) | Mixed team relay | 4:23.141 | 4 qB | 4:24.360 | 4 |
| Team E Sarah Warren (USA); Kei Saito (JPN); Lin Yu-Tzu (TPE); Josse Antonissen (NED) | Mixed team relay | 4:36.208 | 4 qB | 4:30.383 | 6 |

Notes

^^{1}Warren was relegated to the B final after the semifinal, and placed first in the B final. She finished fourth overall.
^^{2}Warren qualified for the C final after the semifinal, and placed fourth in the C final. She finished eleventh overall.

== Skeleton ==
The United States qualified one male and two female athletes in the skeleton event.

| Athlete | Event | Run 1 | Run 2 | Total | Rank |
|---|---|---|---|---|---|
| Anthony Herringshaw | Boys' | 59.00 | 59.16 | 1:58.16 | 7 |
| Timi Earl | Girls' | | 1:01.04 | 1:01.04 | 9 |
| Lizzy Maxwell | Girls' | | 59.50 | 59.50 | 7 |

== Ski jumping ==
The United States qualified one male and one female athlete in the ski jumping event.

Individual

| Athlete | Event | 1st Jump | | 2nd Jump | | Overall | |
| Athlete | Event | Distance | Points | Distance | Points | Points | Rank |
|---|---|---|---|---|---|---|---|
| William Rhoads | Boys' individual | 59.0m | 86.4 | 63.0m | 95.0 | 181.4 | 19 |
| Emilee Anderson | Girls' individual | 59.5m | 85.1 | 65.5m | 101.0 | 186.1 | 9 |

Ski Jumping/Nordic combined Mixed team

| Athlete | Event | 1st Round | 2nd Round | Total | Rank |
|---|---|---|---|---|---|
| Emilee Anderson; Colton Kissel; William Rhoads | Mixed team | 205.7 | 230.5 | 436.2 | 11 |

== Snowboarding ==
The United States qualified one male and one female snowboarder each in the men's and women's half-pipe and slopestyle competitions.

| Athlete | Event | Qualification | | | Semifinals | | | Finals | | |
| Athlete | Event | Run 1 | Run 2 | Rank | Run 1 | Run 2 | Rank | Run 1 | Run 2 | Rank |
|---|---|---|---|---|---|---|---|---|---|---|
| Ben Ferguson | Boys' halfpipe | 88.00 | 33.75 | 3 Q | | | | 90.25 | 93.25 | 1st place, gold medalist(s) |
| Ben Ferguson | Boys' slopestyle | 80.50 | 90.25 | 1 Q | | | | 90.25 | 87.50 | 2nd place, silver medalist(s) |
| Max Raymer | Boys' halfpipe | 47.00 | 48.50 | 10 | did not advance | | | | | |
| Max Raymer | Boys' slopestyle | 74.25 | 80.75 | 2 Q | | | | 39.25 | 85.00 | 5 |
| Arielle Gold | Girls' halfpipe | 88.50 | 27.00 | 1 Q | | | | 90.00 | 86.50 | 2nd place, silver medalist(s) |
| Arielle Gold | Girls' slopestyle | 77.50 | 72.50 | 4 Q | | | | 71.75 | 69.00 | 2nd place, silver medalist(s) |
| Indigo Monk | Girls' halfpipe | 45.00 | 46.75 | 8 q | 59.25 | 54.50 | 5 | did not advance | | |
| Indigo Monk | Girls' slopestyle | 65.75 | 77.25 | 5 | | | | 55.00 | 50.00 | 5 |

== Speed skating ==
The United States qualified one female speed skater.

| Athlete | Event | Heats | | Finals | |
| Athlete | Event | Time | Rank | Time | Rank |
|---|---|---|---|---|---|
| Clare Jeong | Girls' 3000 metres | | | 4:54.04 | 8 |
| Clare Jeong | Girls' mass start | | | 6:11.73 | 13 |

== See also ==
- United States at the 2012 Summer Olympics
