= Ski jumping at the 2012 Winter Youth Olympics – Girls' individual =

Girls' individual at the I Winter Youth Olympic Games
- Venue: Toni-Seelos-Olympiaschanze
- Dates: January 14
- Competitors: 14 from 14 nations
- Winning points: 269.3

Medalists
1st place, gold medalist(s)		Sara Takanashi	Japan
2nd place, silver medalist(s)		Katharina Althaus	Germany
3rd place, bronze medalist(s)		Urša Bogataj	Slovenia

The girls' individual competition of the ski jumping events at the 2012 Winter Youth Olympics in Innsbruck, Austria, was held on January 14, at the Toni-Seelos-Olympiaschanze. 14 athletes from 14 different countries took part in this event.

== Results ==
The first round was started on 14 January at 11:00 and the final round at 12:00.

Rank	Bib	Name	Country	Round 1 Distance (m)	Round 1 Points	Round 1 Rank	Final Round Distance (m)	Final Round Points	Final Round Rank	Total Points
1st place, gold medalist(s)	11	Sara Takanashi	Japan	76.5	134.4	1	76.5	134.9	1	269.3
2nd place, silver medalist(s)	12	Katharina Althaus	Germany	71.0	119.2	3	72.5	123.3	2	242.5
3rd place, bronze medalist(s)	13	Urša Bogataj	Slovenia	71.5	120.4	2	71.5	118.9	3	239.3
4	10	Léa Lemare	France	67.0	108.6	4	70.5	117.5	4	226.1
5	1	Taylor Henrich	Canada	64.0	99.4	5	66.0	105.2	5	204.6
6	7	Natálie Dejmková	Czech Republic	64.5	99.1	6	63.5	97.2	8	196.3
7	3	Jenny Rautionaho	Finland	62.5	96.3	8	63.5	98.7	7	195.0
8	6	Karoline Røstad	Norway	63.5	96.7	7	62.0	93.1	9	189.8
9	2	Emilee Anderson	United States	59.5	85.1	9	65.5	101.0	6	186.1
10	8	Anastasia Veshchikova	Russia	58.0	83.5	10	59.0	86.4	10	169.9
11	4	Li Xueyao	China	59.5	82.1	11	58.0	79.5	11	161.6
12	9	Veronica Gianmoena	Italy	51.0	66.2	12	55.5	76.0	12	142.2
13	14	Michaela Kranzl	Austria	50.0	63.8	13	50.5	64.5	13	128.3
14	5	Magdalena Pałasz	Poland	40.5	34.5	14	43.5	43.2	14	77.7
