= Snowboarding at the 2012 Winter Youth Olympics – Boys' halfpipe =

Boys' halfpipe at the I Winter Youth Olympic Games
- Venue: Kühtai
- Date: 15 January
- Competitors: 27 from 18 nations
- Winning points: 93.25

Medalists
1st place, gold medalist(s)		Ben Ferguson	United States
2nd place, silver medalist(s)		Tim-Kevin Ravnjak	Slovenia
3rd place, bronze medalist(s)		Taku Hiraoka	Japan

The boys' halfpipe competition of the snowboarding events at the 2012 Winter Youth Olympics in Innsbruck, Austria, was held January 15, at Kühtai. 27 athletes from 18 countries took part in this event.

== Results ==
=== Qualification ===
The qualification was started on 15 January at 09:30. The three best snowboarders from each heat qualified for the final (QF) and the six snowboarders from each heat qualified for the semifinal (QSF).

Rank	Bib	Heat	Name	Country	Run 1	Run 2	Best	Notes
1	8	1	Taku Hiraoka	Japan	91.75	95.00	95.00	QF
2	20	2	Tim-Kevin Ravnjak	Slovenia	89.25	93.00	93.00	QF
3	21	2	Ben Ferguson	United States	88.00	33.75	88.00	QF
4	16	2	David Hablützel	Switzerland	78.25	82.75	82.75	QF
5	26	2	Michael Ciccarelli	Canada	53.25	78.75	78.75	QSF
6	2	1	Sebbe De Buck	Belgium	76.75	45.50	76.75	QF
7	3	1	Nikita Avtaneev	Russia	66.00	72.50	72.50	QF
8	4	1	Jan Kralj	Slovenia	65.50	69.00	69.00	QSF
9	17	2	Johannes Höpfl	Germany	67.00	21.25	67.00	QSF
10	14	1	Hamish Bagley	New Zealand	58.50	64.75	64.75	QSF
11	6	1	Yannis Tourki	France	62.50	39.00	62.50	QSF
12	15	2	Lucas Baume	Switzerland	31.75	62.25	62.25	QSF
13	5	1	Sean Taylor	Netherlands	34.25	60.50	60.50	QSF
14	27	2	Lewis Courtier-Jones	Great Britain	46.75	60.00	60.00	QSF
15	13	1	Na Myung-joo	South Korea	54.75	37.00	54.75	QS
16	9	1	Ivan Kardonov	Russia	54.00	54.50	54.50	QSF
17	23	2	Kalle Järvilehto	Finland	51.25	53.75	53.75	QSF
18	19	2	Victor Habermacher	France	52.50	29.00	52.50	QSF
19	18	2	Manex Azula	Spain	35.00	49.00	49.00	
20	11	1	Max Raymer	United States	47.00	48.50	48.50	
21	10	1	Ondrej Porkert	Czech Republic	41.50	47.50	47.50	
22	24	2	Stef Van Deursen	Belgium	44.50	47.50	47.50	
23	22	2	Tuomas Pohjonen	Finland	47.25	45.00	47.25	
24	12	1	Roland Hörtnagl	Austria	42.25	10.75	42.25	
25	7	1	Linus Birkendahl	Germany	40.25	21.00	40.25	
26	25	2	Ludvig Billtoft	Sweden	35.50	38.00	38.00	
27	1	1	Philipp Kundratitz	Austria	31.25	18.00	31.25	

=== Semifinal ===
The semifinal was started on 15 January at 09:30. The six best snowboarderst qualified for the final (QF).

Rank	Bib	Name	Country	Run 1	Run 2	Best	Notes
1	26	Michael Ciccarelli	Canada	84.75	77.25	84.75	QF
2	17	Johannes Höpfl	Germany	80.25	21.50	80.25	QF
3	4	Jan Kralj	Slovenia	76.00	67.50	76.00	QF
4	6	Yannis Tourki	France	70.50	71.25	71.25	QF
5	14	Hamish Bagley	New Zealand	40.50	68.50	68.50	QF
6	5	Sean Taylor	Netherlands	47.00	67.00	67.00	QF
7	13	Na Myung-joo	South Korea	65.00	45.00	65.00	
8	27	Lewis Courtier-Jones	Great Britain	59.75	41.25	59.25	
9	9	Ivan Kardonov	Russia	55.25	57.50	57.50	
10	23	Kalle Järvilehto	Finland	54.00	37.50	54.00	
11	19	Victor Habermacher	France	36.25	35.75	36.25	
	15	Lucas Baume	Switzerland	Did not start			

=== Final ===
The final was started on 15 January at 13:40.

Rank	Bib	Name	Country	Run 1	Run 2	Best
1st place, gold medalist(s)	21	Ben Ferguson	United States	90.25	93.25	93.25
2nd place, silver medalist(s)	20	Tim-Kevin Ravnjak	Slovenia	59.35	86.75	86.75
3rd place, bronze medalist(s)	8	Taku Hiraoka	Japan	55.75	84.25	84.25
4	26	Michael Ciccarelli	Canada	74.50	84.00	84.00
5	16	David Hablützel	Switzerland	49.00	80.25	80.25
6	4	Jan Kralj	Slovenia	68.25	75.00	75.00
7	3	Nikita Avtaneev	Russia	74.25	70.25	74.25
8	17	Johannes Höpfl	Germany	64.25	71.50	71.50
9	6	Yannis Tourki	France	63.00	57.25	63.00
10	14	Hamish Bagley	New Zealand	57.25	46.25	57.25
11	5	Sean Taylor	Netherlands	49.25	39.00	49.25
12	2	Sebbe De Buck	Belgium	33.50	24.00	33.50
