= Patrick Caldwell =

Patrick Caldwell may refer to:

- Patrick C. Caldwell (1801–1855), U.S. Representative from South Carolina
- Patrick Caldwell (skier) (born 1994), American cross-country skier
