= Bobsleigh at the 2012 Winter Youth Olympics =

Bobsleigh at the I Winter Youth Olympic Games
- Venue: Olympic Sliding Centre Innsbruck; Igls
- Dates: 22 January
- Competitors: 36 from 13 nations

Bobsleigh at the 2012 Winter Youth Olympics took place at the Olympic Sliding Centre Innsbruck in Igls, Innsbruck, Austria on 22 January. The competition had a 2 boys' and a 2 girls' events, with the 4 boys' competition being excluded.

== Medal summary ==
=== Medal table ===
* Host nation (Austria)

Rank	Nation	Gold	Silver	Bronze	Total
1	Netherlands	1	0	1	2
2	Italy	1	0	0	1
3	Austria*	0	1	0	1
3	Great Britain	0	1	0	1
5	Monaco	0	0	1	1
Totals (5 entries)		2	2	2	6

=== Events ===
Event	Gold		Silver		Bronze	
Two-boys	Patrick Baumgartner; Alessandro Grande; Italy	1:49.14	Benjamin Maier; Robert Ofensberger; Austria	1:49.23	Rudy Rinaldi; Jérémy Torre; Monaco	1:49.31
Two-girls	Marije van Huigenbosch; Sanne Dekker; Netherlands	1:51.62	Mica McNeill; Jazmin Sawyers; Great Britain	1:51.95	Kimberley Bos; Mandy Groot; Netherlands	1:52.15

== Qualification System ==
=== Boys' ===
The FIBT did not release a final list of qualified teams, this is just a list of teams in alphabetical order according to qualification system.

Event	Vacancies	Qualified
Europe/Africa	6	Germany; Great Britain; Italy; Latvia; Monaco; Russia
Americas	2	Canada; United States
Asia/Oceania	1	South Korea
Host	1	Austria
TOTAL	10	

=== Girls' ===
The FIBT did not release a final list of qualified teams, this is just a list of teams in alphabetical order according to qualification system.

Event	Vacancies	Qualified
Europe/Africa	6	Great Britain; Great Britain; Italy; Netherlands; Netherlands; Romania
Americas	~~2~~ 1	Canada
Asia/Oceania	1	Japan
Host	~~1~~	~~Austria~~
TOTAL	8	

=== Qualification summary ===
NOC	Boys'	Girls'	Total
Austria	1		2
Canada	1	1	4
Germany	1		2
Great Britain	1	2	6
Italy	1	1	4
Japan		1	2
Latvia	1		2
Monaco	1		2
Netherlands		2	4
Romania		1	2
Russia	1		2
South Korea	1		2
United States	1		2
Total athletes	20	16	36
Total NOCs	10	6	13
