= Dejmal =

Czech-language surname

Dejmal (feminine: Dejmalová) is a Czech surname. It was derived from the Czech word dým ('smoke') and there is a theory that it may have originated as a nickname for a curly-haired person. A similar surname with the same origin is Dejmek. Notable people with the surname include:

- Ivan Dejmal (1946–2008), Czech politician
- Jaroslav Dejmal (1892–1975), Czech confectioner and businessman
- Jindřich Dejmal (born 1948), Czech football manager
