= Ski jumping at the 2017 Winter Universiade – Women's individual normal hill =

The women's individual normal hill competition of the 2017 Winter Universiade will be held at the Sunkar International Ski Jumping Complex in Almaty on February 1.

== Results ==
Rank	Bib	Name	Country	Round 1 Distance (m)	Round 1 Points	Round 1 Rank	Final Round Distance (m)	Final Round Points	Final Round Rank	Total Points
	1	Alena Sutiagina	Russia							
	2	Marta Křepelková	Czech Republic							
	3	Dong Bing	China							
	4	Dayana Akhmetvaliyeva	Kazakhstan							
	5	Stefaniya Nadymova	Russia							
	6	Magdalena Pałasz	Poland							
	7	Jun Maruyama	Japan							
	8	Karolína Indráčková	Czech Republic							
	9	Susanna Forsstroem	Finland							
	10	Haruka Iwasa	Japan							
	11	Michaela Doleželová	Czech Republic							
	12	Yuka Kobayashi	Japan							
