= Mixed sports at the 2012 Winter Youth Olympics – Cross-country / Biathlon mixed relay =

Cross-country / Biathlon mixed relay at the I Winter Youth Olympic Games
- Venue: Seefeld Arena
- Date: 21 January
- Competitors: 96 from 24 nations
- Winning time: 1:04:23.4

Medalists
1st place, gold medalist(s)		Franziska Preuß; Victoria Carl; Maximilian Janke; Christian Stiebritz	Germany
2nd place, silver medalist(s)		Uliana Kaisheva; Anastasia Sedova; Ivan Galushkin; Alexander Selyaninov	Russia
3rd place, bronze medalist(s)		Anna Kubek; Heather Mooney; Sean Doherty; Patrick Caldwell	United States

The Cross-country / Biathlon mixed relay competition of the biathlon and cross country events at the 2012 Winter Youth Olympics in Innsbruck, Austria, was held on January 21, at Seefeld Arena. 24 nations took part in this event.

== Medal summary ==
=== Medal table ===
Rank	Nation	Gold	Silver	Bronze	Total
1	Germany	1	0	0	1
2	Russia	0	1	0	1
3	United States	0	0	1	1
Totals (3 entries)		1	1	1	3

== Results ==
The race was started at 10:30.

Rank	Bib	Country	Gender	Sport	Time	Penalties (P+S)	Deficit
1st place, gold medalist(s)	19	Germany; Franziska Preuß; Victoria Carl; Maximilian Janke; Christian Stiebritz	F F M M	BT; CC; BT; CC	1:04:23.4; 18:16.8; 10:23.9; 23:06.3; 12:36.4	1+3 0+3; 0+0 0+1 1+3 0+2	—
2nd place, silver medalist(s)	8	Russia; Uliana Kaisheva; Anastasia Sedova; Ivan Galushkin; Alexander Selyaninov	F F M M	BT; CC; BT; CC	1:05:22.5; 20:49.0; 9:57.9; 22:34.8; 12:00.8	1+4 1+5; 1+3 1+3 0+1 0+2	+59.1
3rd place, bronze medalist(s)	12	United States; Anna Kubek; Heather Mooney; Sean Doherty; Patrick Caldwell	F F M M	BT; CC; BT; CC	1:05:23.0; 20:27.1; 11:09.3; 21:29.6; 12:17.0	0+2 0+3; 0+1 0+2 0+1 0+1	+59.6
4	15	Switzerland; Aita Gasparin; Nadine Fähndrich; Kenneth Schöpfer; Jason Rüesch	F F M M	BT; CC; BT; CC	1:05:36.0; 19:54.8; 10:49.7; 22:46.3; 12:05.2	0+4 0+1; 0+2 0+1 0+2 0+0	+1:12.6
5	14	France; Léa Ducordeau; Constance Vulliet; Fabien Claude; Thomas Chambellant	F F M M	BT; CC; BT; CC	1:06:01.9; 19:58.4; 11:46.4; 21:40.1; 12:37.0	0+2 0+3; 0+1 0+2 0+1 0+1	+1:38.5
6	5	Sweden; Lotten Sjödén; Jonna Sundling; Niklas Forsberg; Marcus Ruus	F F M M	BT; CC; BT; CC	1:06:07.9; 20:31.9; 10:41.8; 22:31.1; 12:23.1	0+4 0+5; 0+2 0+3 0+2 0+2	+1:44.5
7	16	Austria; Julia Reisinger; Lisa Unterweger; Michael Pfeffer; Alexander Gotthalmseder	F F M M	BT; CC; BT; CC	1:06:22.9; 19:49.5; 10:46.5; 23:02.0; 12:44.9	0+1 2+4; 0+0 0+1 0+1 2+3	+1:59.5
8	6	Estonia; Meril Beilmann; Kelly Vainlo; Rene Zahkna; Andreas Veerpalu	F F M M	BT; CC; BT; CC	1:06:37.7; 20:32.6; 11:40.2; 21:43.6; 12:41.3	0+2 0+2; 0+1 0+1 0+1 0+1	+2:14.3
9	18	Norway; Kristin Sandeggen; Silje Theodorsen; Kristian André Aalerud; Chrisander Skjønberg Holth	F F M M	BT; CC; BT; CC	1:06:46.2; 20:00.0; 10:30.4; 23:40.5; 12:35.3	3+3 0+3; 0+0 0+2 3+3 0+1	+2:22.8
10	11	Kazakhstan; Galina Vishnevskaya; Alexandra Kun; Ruslan Bessov; Sergey Malyshev	F F M M	BT; CC; BT; CC	1:06:47.8; 19:53.1; 11:34.1; 23:35.5; 11:45.1	2+4 2+4; 2+3 0+1 0+1 2+3	+2:24.4
11	17	Italy; Lisa Vittozzi; Alice Canclini; Xavier Guidetti; Manuel Perotti	F F M M	BT; CC; BT; CC	1:07:05.7; 20:29.4; 11:19.5; 22:34.0; 12:42.8	0+4 0+3; 0+2 0+2 0+2 0+1	+2:42.3
12	3	Czech Republic; Jessica Jislová; Petra Hynčicová; Adam Václavík; Petr Knop	F F M M	BT; CC; BT; CC	1:07:34.5; 20:31.5; 11:16.3; 23:28.4; 12:18.3	0+2 3+6; 0+0 1+3 0+2 2+3	+3:11.1
13	4	Canada; Danielle Vrielink; Maya MacIsaac-Jones; Stuart Harden; Matthew Saurette	F F M M	BT; CC; BT; CC	1:08:10.9; 20:43.2; 11:08.6; 23:18.9; 13:00.2	0+1 0+3; 0+1 0+0 0+0 0+3	+3:47.5
14	23	Ukraine; Anastasiya Merkushyna; Oksana Shatalova; Maksym Ivko; Oleksii Krasovskyi	F F M M	BT; CC; BT; CC	1:08:48.9; 20:15.3; 11:06.2; 24:44.0; 12:43.4	2+4 2+6; 0+1 1+3 2+3 1+3	+4:25.5
15	21	Belarus; Liudmila Kiaura; Ina Lukonina; Viktar Kryuko; Maksim Hardzias	F F M M	BT; CC; BT; CC	1:09:32.7; 22:22.6; 11:14.8; 22:28.7; 13:26.6	0+3 1+5; 0+1 1+3 0+2 0+2	+5:09.3
16	1	Slovenia; Eva Urevc; Anamarija Lampič; Miha Dovžan; Miha Šimenc	F F M M	BT; CC; BT; CC	1:10:10.0; 22:46.1; 10:42.0; 23:30.2; 13:11.7	1+5 3+4; 1+3 3+3 0+2 0+1	+5:46.6
17	22	Slovakia; Ivona Fialková; Barbora Klementová; Ondrej Kosztolányi; Andrej Segeč	F F M M	BT; CC; BT; CC	1:10:14.7; 22:20.5; 10:55.5; 24:20.8; 12:37.9	0+4 1+6; 0+1 1+3 0+3 0+3	+5:51.3
18	20	Poland; Beata Lassak; Urszula Łętocha; Jakub Topór; Dawid Bril	F F M M	BT; CC; BT; CC	1:11:40.6; 23:30.6; 11:29.2; 23:46.2; 12:54.6	0+2 4+4; 0+1 4+3 0+1 0+1	+7:17.2
19	7	Finland; Jenny Ingman; Katri Lylynperä; Antti Repo; Joonas Sarkkinen	F F M M	BT; CC; BT; CC	1:12:28.6; 24:55.0; 11:03.5; 23:56.2; 12:33.9	1+6 4+4; 1+3 4+3 0+3 0+1	+8:05.2
20	10	Bulgaria; Mariela Georgieva; Kameliya Ilieva; Radi Palevski; Simeon Deyanov	F F M M	BT; CC; BT; CC	1:14:00.5; 23:47.6; 11:59.0; 25:18.5; 12:55.4	4+6 0+5; 3+3 0+3 1+3 0+2	+9:37.1
21	2	Romania; Iulia Ioana Ţigani; Simona Ungureanu; Marius Ungureanu; Florin Daniel Pripici	F F M M	BT; CC; BT; CC	1:14:33.5; 23:47.1; 11:59.9; 25:51.9; 12:54.6	2+6 0+4; 1+3 0+2 1+3 0+2	+10:10.1
22	24	Lithuania; Gaudvilė Nalivaikaitė; Kristina Kazlauskaitė; Arnoldas Mikelkevičius; Jaunius Drūsys	F F M M	BT; CC; BT; CC	1:14:57.8; 24:32.0; 11:46.5; 24:55.3; 13:44.0	2+4 1+5; 2+3 0+2 0+1 1+3	+10:34.4
23	13	Latvia; Gunita Gaile; Zane Eglīte; Linards Zēmelis; Arnis Pētersons	F F M M	BT; CC; BT; CC	1:17:29.0; 25:15.8; 13:54.3; 24:31.3; 13:47.6	0+3 0+3; 0+2 0+2 0+1 0+1	+13:05.6
24	9	South Korea; Jang Ji-yeon; Lee Yeong-ae; Choi Du-jin; Ji Won	F F M M	BT; CC; BT; CC	1:20:14.2; 25:32.4; 12:14.8; 27:59.8; 14:27.2	4+6 3+6; 1+3 2+3 3+3 1+3	+15:50.8
