= Dejmek =

Dejmek (feminine: Dejmková) is a Czech surname. It was derived from the Czech word dým ('smoke') and there is a theory that it may have originated as a nickname for a curly-haired person. A similar surname with the same origin is Dejmal. Notable people with the surname include:

- Kazimierz Dejmek (1924–2002), Polish actor, theatre and film director, and politician
- Natálie Dejmková (born 1996), Czech ski jumper
- Radek Dejmek (born 1988), Czech footballer
