= Austria at the 2012 Winter Youth Olympics =

- IOC code: AUT
- NOC: Austrian Olympic Committee
- Website: www.olympia.at

in Innsbruck
- Competitors: 81 in 15 sports
- Flag bearer: Tamara Grascher
- Medals Ranked 3rd: Gold 6 Silver 4 Bronze 3 Total 13

Winter Youth Olympics appearances (overview)
- 2012; 2016; 2020; 2024

Austria was the host of the 2012 Winter Youth Olympics in Innsbruck, Austria. With 81 athletes competing, Austria was the largest team at these Games. The host nation competed in all events except for the Figure Skating pair's event.

== Medalists ==
Medals awarded to participants of mixed-NOC (combined) teams are represented in italics. These medals are not counted towards the individual NOC medal tally.

Medal	Name	Sport	Event	Date
Gold	Marco Schwarz	Alpine Skiing	Boys' combined	15 Jan
Gold	Elisabeth Gram	Freestyle skiing	Girls' halfpipe	15 Jan
Gold	Miriam-Stefanie Kastlunger	Luge	Girls' singles	16 Jan
Gold	Martina Rettenwender; Marco Schwarz; Christine Ager; Mathias Graf	Alpine skiing	Parallel mixed team	17 Jan
Gold	Marco Schwarz	Alpine skiing	Boys' giant slalom	19 Jan
Gold	Michaela Heider	Freestyle Skiing	Girls' ski cross	21 Jan
Silver	Stefan Geisler	Skeleton	Boys' individual	21 Jan
Silver	Carina Mair	Skeleton	Girls' individual	21 Jan
Silver	Benjamin Maier; Robert Ofensberger	Bobsleigh	Two-boys	22 Jan
Silver	Austria women's national under-18 ice hockey team: Nicole Arnberger; Julia Frick; Tamara Grascher; Alexandra Gürtler; Victoria Hummel; Anna Katharina Iberer; Martina Kneß; Anja List; Paula Camilla Marchart; Anna Meixner; Anna Meixner; Julia Pechmann; Paulina Polczik; Noemi Prosenz; Anna Schmid; Luisa Steiner; Julia Willenshofer	Ice hockey	Girls' competition	22 Jan
Bronze	Christine Ager	Alpine skiing	Girls' super-G	14 Jan
Bronze	Miriam-Stefanie Kastlunger; Armin Frauscher; Thomas Steu; Lorenz Koller	Luge	Mixed Team Relay	17 Jan
Bronze	Mathias Graf	Alpine Skiing	Boys' slalom	21 Jan
Bronze	Melanie Brantner	Short track	Mixed team relay	21 Jan

== Alpine skiing ==
=== Boys ===
Athlete	Event	Final			
Athlete	Event	Run 1	Run 2	Total	Rank
Mathias Graf	Slalom	40.16	40.19	1:20.35	3rd place, bronze medalist(s)
Mathias Graf	Giant slalom	58.34	DNF		
Mathias Graf	Super-G			1:05.62	10
Mathias Graf	Combined	1:04.16	38.51	1:42.67	7
Marco Schwarz	Slalom	DNF			
Marco Schwarz	Giant slalom	57.31	54.39	1:51.70	1st place, gold medalist(s)
Marco Schwarz	Super-G			DNF	
Marco Schwarz	Combined	1:03.32	37.13	1:40.45	1st place, gold medalist(s)

=== Girls ===
Athlete	Event	Final			
Athlete	Event	Run 1	Run 2	Total	Rank
Christine Ager	Slalom	41.89	DNF		
Christine Ager	Giant slalom	58.90	1:00.23	1:59.13	9
Christine Ager	Super-G			1:06.06	3rd place, bronze medalist(s)
Christine Ager	Combined	DNF			
Martina Rettenwender	Slalom	DNF			
Martina Rettenwender	Giant slalom	59.33	DNF		
Martina Rettenwender	Super-G			1:06.10	5
Martina Rettenwender	Combined	1:05.84	36.41	1:42.25	5

=== Team ===
Athlete	Event	Quarterfinals	Semifinals	Final	Rank
Martina Rettenwender; Marco Schwarz; Christine Ager; Mathias Graf	Parallel mixed team	Canada; W 4-0	France; W 2-2	Norway; W 3-1	1st place, gold medalist(s)

== Biathlon ==
=== Boys ===
Athlete	Event	Final		
Athlete	Event	Time	Misses	Rank
Thorsten Bischof	Sprint	22:17.7	4	28
Thorsten Bischof	Pursuit	31:38.8	3	13
Michael Pfeffer	Sprint	20:35.3	3	10
Michael Pfeffer	Pursuit	31:51.1	9	15

=== Girls ===
Athlete	Event	Final		
Athlete	Event	Time	Misses	Rank
Julia Anna Reisinger	Sprint	18:24.0	1	7
Julia Anna Reisinger	Pursuit	29:03.3	2	6

=== Mixed ===
Athlete	Event	Final		
Athlete	Event	Time	Misses	Rank
Julia Anna Reisinger; Magdalena Millinger; Michael Pfeffer; Thorsten Bischof	Mixed relay	1:19:05.3	4+16	13
Julia Reisinger; Lisa Unterweger; Michael Pfeffer; Alexander Gotthalmseder	Cross-Country-Biathlon Mixed Relay	1:06:22.9	2+5	7

== Bobsleigh ==
Boys

Benjamin Maier and Robert Ofensberger will compete for Austria in the boys' bobsleigh event>

Athlete	Event	Final			
Athlete	Event	Run 1	Run 2	Total	Rank
Benjamin Maier; Robert Ofensberger	Two-Boys	54.60	54.63	1:49.23	2nd place, silver medalist(s)

== Cross-country skiing ==
=== Boys ===
Athlete	Event	Final	
Athlete	Event	Time	Rank
Alexander Gotthalmseder	10 km classical	32:34.6	26
Johannes Fabian Kattnig	10 km classical	33:57.6	34

=== Girls ===
Athlete	Event	Final	
Athlete	Event	Time	Rank
Sandra Bader	5 km classical	17:26.2	28
Lisa Unterweger	5 km classical	16:42.9	22

=== Sprint ===
Athlete	Event	Qualification		Quarterfinal		Semifinal		Final	
Athlete	Event	Total	Rank	Total	Rank	Total	Rank	Total	Rank
Alexander Gotthalmseder	Boys' sprint	1:49.96	27 Q	1:52.2	5	did not advance			
Johannes Fabian Kattnig	Boys' sprint	1:46.16	9 Q	1:48.2	1 Q	5:28.0	6	did not advance	
Sandra Bader	Girls' sprint	1:59.84	5 Q	2:29.4	6	did not advance			
Lisa Unterweger	Girls' sprint	1:59.15	4 Q	2:02.2	2 Q	2:02.0	6	did not advance	

=== Mixed ===
Athlete	Event	Final		
Athlete	Event	Time	Misses	Rank
Julia Reisinger; Lisa Unterweger; Michael Pfeffer; Alexander Gotthalmseder	Cross-Country-Biathlon Mixed Relay	1:06:22.9	2+5	7

== Curling ==
=== Mixed team ===
Team

Skip: Mathias Genner
Third: Camilla Schnabl
Second: Martin Reichel
Lead: Irena Brettbacher

==== Standings ====
Final Round Robin Standings

Red Group	Skip	W	L
Sweden	Rasmus Wranå	6	1
Canada	Thomas Scoffin	5	2
Japan	Shingo Usui	4	3
Italy	Amos Mosaner	4	3
Great Britain	Duncan Menzies	3	4
Russia	Mikhail Vaskov	3	4
Austria	Mathias Genner	2	5
Germany	Daniel Rothballer	1	6

==== Round-robin results ====
Draw 1

Sheet B	1	2	3	4	5	6	7	8	Final
Great Britain (Menzies)	1	2	1	1	4	0	X	X	9
Austria (Genner) 🔨	0	0	0	0	0	1	X	X	1

Draw 2

Sheet A	1	2	3	4	5	6	7	8	Final
Austria (Genner)	0	0	0	1	0	3	0	2	6
Canada (Scoffin) 🔨	0	3	0	0	1	0	1	0	5

Draw 3

Sheet D	1	2	3	4	5	6	7	8	9	Final
Austria (Genner)	0	2	0	0	0	3	0	0	0	5
Japan (Usui) 🔨	1	0	0	1	0	0	2	1	2	7

Draw 4

Sheet B	1	2	3	4	5	6	7	8	9	Final
Austria (Genner) 🔨	0	2	0	0	0	2	0	1	7	12
Germany (Rothballer)	0	0	1	2	1	0	1	0	0	5

Draw 5

Sheet C	1	2	3	4	5	6	7	8	Final
Austria (Genner)	0	2	3	0	0	0	0	X	5
Sweden (Wranå) 🔨	1	0	0	2	1	1	2	X	7

Draw 6

Sheet A	1	2	3	4	5	6	7	8	Final
Russia (Vaskov) 🔨	4	0	0	2	0	0	0	2	8
Austria (Genner)	0	1	1	0	1	1	1	0	5

Draw 7

Sheet C	1	2	3	4	5	6	7	8	Final
Italy (Mosaner) 🔨	2	0	0	2	2	0	0	X	6
Austria (Genner)	0	0	1	0	0	1	1	X	3

=== Mixed doubles ===
==== Results ====
Round of 32

Sheet B	1	2	3	4	5	6	7	8	Final
Wang Jinbo (CHN); Ina Roll Backe (NOR) 🔨	2	2	0	1	0	2	0	1	8
Camilla Schnabel (AUT); Jordan Wåhlin (SWE)	0	0	2	0	3	0	2	0	7

Sheet C	1	2	3	4	5	6	7	8	Final
Corryn Brown (CAN); Martin Reichel (AUT) 🔨	1	0	0	3	0	1	1	0	6
Shingo Usui (JPN); Cao Ying (CHN)	0	1	1	0	1	0	0	1	4

Sheet A	1	2	3	4	5	6	7	8	Final
Mathias Genner (AUT); Lisa Gisler (SUI)	0	0	0	1	0	1	0	X	2
Yang Ying (CHN); Thomas Howell (USA) 🔨	3	1	2	0	3	0	1	X	10

Sheet D	1	2	3	4	5	6	7	8	Final
Alžběta Baudyšová (CZE); Bai Yang (CHN)	0	0	0	5	1	0	3	0	9
Amos Mosaner (ITA); Irena Brettbacher (AUT) 🔨	1	1	1	0	0	4	0	3	10

Round of 16

Sheet A	1	2	3	4	5	6	7	8	Final
Corryn Brown (CAN); Martin Reichel (AUT) 🔨	1	1	1	2	0	1	1	0	7
Kang Sue-yeon (KOR); Krystof Krupanský (CZE)	0	0	0	0	2	0	0	2	4

Sheet B	1	2	3	4	5	6	7	8	Final
Yoo Min-hyeon (KOR); Mako Tamakuma (JPN) 🔨	2	0	3	1	1	0	2	X	9
Amos Mosaner (ITA); Irena Brettbacher (AUT)	0	1	0	0	0	3	0	X	4

Quarterfinals

Sheet D	1	2	3	4	5	6	7	8	Final
Korey Dropkin (USA); Marina Verenich (RUS)	1	2	2	0	4	0	0	X	9
Corryn Brown (CAN); Martin Reichel (AUT) 🔨	0	0	0	1	0	1	1	X	3

== Figure skating ==
=== Boys ===
Athlete(s)	Event	SP/OD		FS/FD		Total	
Athlete(s)	Event	Points	Rank	Points	Rank	Points	Rank
Manuel Drechsler	Singles	28.62	15	56.46	16	85.08	15

=== Girls ===
Athlete(s)	Event	SP/OD		FS/FD		Total	
Athlete(s)	Event	Points	Rank	Points	Rank	Points	Rank
Nina Larissa Wolfslast	Singles	34.45	12	61.81	13	96.26	13

=== Ice Dance ===
Athlete(s)	Event	SP/OD		FS/FD		Total	
Athlete(s)	Event	Points	Rank	Points	Rank	Points	Rank
Christine Smith; Simon Eisenbauer	Ice Dancing	32.22	9	46.04	9	78.36	9

== Freestyle skiing ==
=== Ski Cross ===
Boy

Athlete	Event	Qualifying		1/4 finals	Semifinals	Final
Athlete	Event	Time	Rank	Rank	Rank	Rank
Michael Schatz	Boys' ski cross	57.76	6	Cancelled		

Girl

Athlete	Event	Qualifying		1/4 finals	Semifinals	Final
Athlete	Event	Time	Rank	Rank	Rank	Rank
Michelle Buchholzer	Girls' ski cross	58.38	1st place, gold medalist(s)	Cancelled		

=== Ski Halfpipe ===
Athlete	Event	Qualifying		Final	
Athlete	Event	Points	Rank	Points	Rank
Elisabeth Gram	Girls' ski half-pipe	87.00	1 Q	84.75	1st place, gold medalist(s)
Daniel Walchhofer	Boys' ski half-pipe	52.75	11 Q	66.25	9

== Ice hockey ==
=== Girls' tournament ===
==== Roster ====
Source: International Ice Hockey Federation

No.	Pos.	2012 Winter Youth Olympics Austria U-16 girls' ice hockey team roster	Height	Weight	Birthdate	Current Team
1	GK	Paula Camilla Marchart	1.67 m (5 ft 6 in)	58 kg (128 lb)	25 July 1994	Wiener Eislöwen
25	GK	Julia Pechmann	1.64 m (5 ft 5 in)	60 kg (130 lb)	10 March 1994	1. DEC Devils Graz
21	D	Nicole Arnberger	1.65 m (5 ft 5 in)	49 kg (108 lb)	27 September 1994	HC Die 48er
14	D	Martina Kneß	1.70 m (5 ft 7 in)	64 kg (141 lb)	6 May 1994	Neuberg Highlanders
19	D	Noemi Prosenz	1.68 m (5 ft 6 in)	49 kg (108 lb)	19 September 1994	Mad Dogs Wr. Neustadt
9	D	Paulina Polczik	1.63 m (5 ft 4 in)	49 kg (108 lb)	20 August 1994	ED "Die Adler" Kitzbühel
30	D	Anna Schmid	1.63 m (5 ft 4 in)	58 kg (128 lb)	30 October 1994	SK Zirl
3	D	Luisa Steiner	1.70 m (5 ft 7 in)	55 kg (121 lb)	13 February 1994	Red Angels Innsbruck
7	F	Julia Frick	1.62 m (5 ft 4 in)	53 kg (117 lb)	29 July 1994	EC "Die Adler" Kitzbühel
13	F	Tamara Grascher	1.68 m (5 ft 6 in)	57 kg (126 lb)	13 June 1994	Gipsy Girls Villach
5	F	Alexandra Gürtler	1.59 m (5 ft 3 in)	69 kg (152 lb)	21 November 1994	Tornados Ice Cats Linz
11	F	Victoria Hummel	1.60 m (5 ft 3 in)	61 kg (134 lb)	4 January 1994	Wiener Eislöwen
27	F	Anna Katharina Iberer	1.68 m (5 ft 6 in)	75 kg (165 lb)	19 March 1994	Vienna Flyers
23	F	Anja List	1.70 m (5 ft 7 in)	67 kg (148 lb)	21 December 1994	DEC Salzburg Eagles
16	F	Anna Meixner	1.63 m (5 ft 4 in)	58 kg (128 lb)	16 June 1994	EK Zeller Eisbären Juniors
18	F	Anna Meixner	1.64 m (5 ft 5 in)	58 kg (128 lb)	21 August 1994	Dylan Panthers Frohnleiten
15	F	Julia Willenshofer	1.61 m (5 ft 3 in)	53 kg (117 lb)	22 September 1994	Kapfenberg Bulls

Coaching staff

Head coach: Christian Yngve

Assistant coach: Klaus Kuhs

==== Results ====
===== Preliminary round =====
Legend
Advance to the Semifinals

Group A

Team	GP	W	OTW	OTL	L	GF	GA	Diff	PTS
Sweden	4	4	0	0	0	43	0	+43	12
Austria	4	3	0	0	1	22	6	+16	9
Germany	4	2	0	0	2	12	16	-4	6
Kazakhstan	4	1	0	0	3	3	28	-25	3
Slovakia	4	0	0	0	4	1	31	-30	0

January 13, 2012; 8:00	Austria	9–0 (2–0, 5–0, 2–0)	Slovakia	Tyrolean Ice Arena; Attendance: 245

Game reference

Paula Camilla Marchhart
Goalies
Nikola Kaliska
Referee:
(Finland) Kaisa Ketonen
Linesmen:
(Czech Republic) Nikola Dvorakova
(Italy) Mirjam Gruber

J. Willenshofer (V. Hummel, N. Arnberger) (PP) – 5:51	1–0
T. Grascher (J. Frick) – 8:33	2–0
T. Grascher (A. Meixner) – 15:46	3–0
A. Guertler (T. Grascher, A. Iberer) – 17:07	4–0
J. Frick – 21:34	5–0
P. Polczik (V. Hummel) – 23:32	6–0
A. Meixner (J. Willenshofer) – 24:59	7–0
J. Frick (A. Meixner, A. List) (PP) – 33:15	8–0
J. Willenshofer (V. Hummel) – 37:23	9–0

2 min
Penalties
4 min
44
Shots
3

January 14, 2012; 10:15	Kazakhstan	1–8 (0–3, 1–4, 0–1)	Austria	Tyrolean Ice Arena; Attendance: 534

Game reference

Anastassiya Ogay
Goalies
Paula Camilla Marchhart
Referee:
(Canada) Meghan Mallette
Linesmen:
(China) HUI Wang
(Finland) Taru Tanhua

	0–1	8:15 – A. Meixner (M. Kness) (PP)
	0–2	9:07 – J. Frick (N. Arnberger, V. Hummel)
	0–3	11:17 – V. Hummel (J. Frick, M. Kness)
	0–4	20:01 – A. Meixner
	0–5	22:40 – A. Schmid (J. Willenshofer, N. Prosenz)
	0–6	24:43 – A. Guertler (A. Iberer, N. Arnberger)
	0–7	26:15 – A. List (A. Meixner, J. Frick)
Z. Nurgaliyeva (S. Urpekbayeva, M. Ryspek) – 27:12	1–7
	1–8	41:58 – V. Hummel (N. Arnberger, M. Kness)

10 min
Penalties
4 min
10
Shots
32

January 16, 2012; 10:30	Germany	2–5 (2–2, 0–1, 0–2)	Austria	Tyrolean Ice Arena; Attendance: 475

Viola Hotter
Goalies
Paula Camilla Marchhart
Referee:
(Canada) Meghan Mallette
Linesmen:
(Czech Republic) Nikola Dvorakova
(Finland) Taru Tanhua

	0–1	6:02 – V. Hummel (J. Willenshofer)
V. Offermann (P. Szawlowski) – 8:34	1–1
	1–2	10:51 – J. Willenshofer (A. Meixner) (SH)
P. Szawlowski (V. Offermann) (PP) – 14:31	2–2
	2–3	15:59 – T. Grascher (A. Meixner)
	2–4	31:01 – J. Willenshofer (J. Frick)
	2–5	33:34 – V. Hummel (T. Grascher)

2 min
Penalties
4 min
31
Shots
20

January 17, 2012; 9:00	Austria	0–3 (0–2, 0–0, 0–1)	Sweden	Tyrolean Ice Arena; Attendance: 432

Paula Camilla Marchhart
Goalies
Jessica Wahlstrom Hjorth
Referee:
(United States) Ceci Morris
Linesmen:
(Italy) Mirjam Gruber
(Denmark) Trine Viskum

0–1	12:31 – A. Lindberg (M. Wong, A. Johansson)
0–2	14:44 – A. Kjellbin (L. Peterson) (PP)
0–3	32:46 – K. Andersson (A. Kjellbin)

14 min
Penalties
35 min
11
Shots
54

===== Semifinals =====
January 20, 2012; 16:30	Austria	2–0 (0–0, 2–0, 0–0)	Germany	Tyrolean Ice Arena; Attendance: 1,311

Paula Camilla Marchhart	Goalies	Meike Krimphove	Referee: (Canada) Meghan Mallette; Linesmen: (Italy) Mirjam Gruber (Finland) Taru Tanhua
A. Meixner (A. List) – 18:17 / 1–0; A. Meixner (V. Hummel) (PP) – 27:06 / 2–0			Referee: (Canada) Meghan Mallette; Linesmen: (Italy) Mirjam Gruber (Finland) Taru Tanhua
8 min	Penalties	6 min	Referee: (Canada) Meghan Mallette; Linesmen: (Italy) Mirjam Gruber (Finland) Taru Tanhua
12	Shots	22	Referee: (Canada) Meghan Mallette; Linesmen: (Italy) Mirjam Gruber (Finland) Taru Tanhua

=== Gold medal game ===
January 22, 2012; 10:00	Sweden	3–0 (1–0, 1–0, 1–0)	Austria	Tyrolean Ice Arena; Attendance: 1,095

Sara Besseling
Goalies
Paula Camilla Marchhart
Referee:
(Finland) Kaisa Ketonen
Linesmen:
(Finland) Taru Tanhua
(Denmark) Trine Viskum

E. Alasalmi (A. Lindberg, M. Wong) (PP) – 13:20	1–0
L. Backlin (R. Hoglund) (PP) – 29:50	2–0
E. Alasalmi (J. Eidensten) – 37:07	3–0

4 min
Penalties
14 min
28
Shots
11

Final rank: (silver)

=== Boys' tournament ===
==== Roster ====
Austria will compete in the boys' ice hockey tournament with a roster of 17 players:

No.	Pos.	2012 Winter Youth Olympics Austria U-16 boys' ice hockey team roster	Height	Weight	Birthdate	Current Team
30	G	Stefan Müller	178 cm (5 ft 10 in)	78 kg (172 lb)	5 February 1996	Pikes EHC Oberthurgau (SUI)
29	G	Thomas Stroj	183 cm (6 ft 0 in)	69 kg (152 lb)	9 April 1996	EC VSV
18	D	Mathias Hagen	176 cm (5 ft 9 in)	75 kg (165 lb)	23 January 1996	SC Rheintal (SUI)
7	D	Fabian Kau	185 cm (6 ft 1 in)	80 kg (180 lb)	2 February 1996	EC KAC
12	D	Erik Kirchschläger	172 cm (5 ft 8 in)	61 kg (134 lb)	4 February 1996	EC Liwest Linz
11	D	Tobias Oberauer	181 cm (5 ft 11 in)	79 kg (174 lb)	10 November 1996	EC KAC
17	D	Lukas Telsnig	178 cm (5 ft 10 in)	76 kg (168 lb)	28 January 1996	EC KAC
19	D	Felix Urstöger	182 cm (6 ft 0 in)	66 kg (146 lb)	5 June 1996	EHC Liwest Linz
9	F	Maximillian Egger	182 cm (6 ft 0 in)	80 kg (180 lb)	11 September 1996	EC Red Bull Salzburg
6	F	Stefan Gaffal	173 cm (5 ft 8 in)	58 kg (128 lb)	24 November 1996	EHC Liwest Linz
4	F	Mario Huber	186 cm (6 ft 1 in)	90 kg (200 lb)	8 August 1996	HC TWK Innsbruck "Die Haie"
8	F	Nikolaus Kraus	177 cm (5 ft 10 in)	70 kg (150 lb)	21 November 1996	L.A. Stars
2	F	Manuel Rosenlechner	176 cm (5 ft 9 in)	80 kg (180 lb)	12 February 1996	EC Red Bull Salzburg
20	F	Sandro Seifried	172 cm (5 ft 8 in)	70 kg (150 lb)	1 November 1996	EC KAC
14	F	Stefan Manuel Trost	178 cm (5 ft 10 in)	68 kg (150 lb)	28 April 1996	Moser Medical Graz 99ers
15	F	Nikolaus Zierer	181 cm (5 ft 11 in)	73 kg (161 lb)	5 January 1996	Moser Medical Graz 99ers
16	F	Dominic Zwerger	181 cm (5 ft 11 in)	80 kg (180 lb)	16 July 1996	SC Rheintal (SUI)

Coaching staff

Head Coach: Kurt Harand
Assistant Coach: Harald Pschernig
Assistant Coach: Wolfgang Hagen
Equipment Manager: Wolfgang Nickel
Team Leader: Wolfgang Ebner

==== Results ====
===== Preliminary rRound =====
Legend
Advance to the Semifinals

Group A

Team	GP	W	OTW	OTL	L	GF	GA	Diff	PTS
Russia	4	3	0	0	1	25	9	+16	9
Canada	4	2	1	0	1	20	7	+13	8
Finland	4	2	0	1	1	13	11	+2	7
United States	4	2	0	0	2	14	18	–4	6
Austria	4	0	0	0	4	3	30	–27	0

January 13, 2012; 10:15	Austria	0–3 (0–0, 0–0, 0–3)	Finland	Tyrolean Ice Arena; Attendance: 520

Game reference

Thomas Stroj
Goalies
Juuso Kannel
Referee:
(Germany) Simon Aicher
Linesmen:
(Belarus) Andrei Haurylenka
(Germany) Benjamin Hoppe

0–1	30:22 – K. Kapanen (W. Hopponen)
0–2	32:05 – W. Hopponen (M. Honkanen, K. Kapanen)
0–3	44:40 – J. Kiviranta (E. Sopanen, J. Kannel) (SH) (ENG)

10 min
Penalties
2 min
8
Shots
44

January 14, 2012; 12:30	United States	7–2 (4–0, 1–1, 2–1)	Austria	Tyrolean Ice Arena; Attendance: 1,180

Game reference

Edwin Minney
Goalies
Stefan Müller
Referee:
(Latvia) Andris Ansons
Linesmen:
(Slovenia) Tilen Pahor
(Sweden) Daniel Persson

S. Gersich (M. Godbout, N. Schmaltz) – 0:47	1–0
J. Wegwerth (J. Eichel, B. Clarke) – 1:13	2–0
R. MacInnis (N. Magyar, A. Baughman) (PP) – 9:02	3–0
S. Gersich (J. Eichel) (PP) – 12:03	4–0
	4–1	20:40 – M. Huber
S. Gersich (N. Billitier) – 23:37	5–1
	5–2	30:44 – S. Gaffal (N. Kraus, M. Huber)
R. MacInnis (M. Godbout, J. Jacobs) (SH) – 41:06	6–2
M. Godbout (N. Schmaltz) (SH) – 41:24	7–2

14 min
Penalties
10 min
42
Shots
16

January 16, 2012; 12:45	Russia	11–1 (0–1, 4–0, 7–0)	Austria	Tyrolean Ice Arena; Attendance: 1,274

Sergey Koborov
Goalies
Thomas Stroj
Referee:
(Sweden) Andreas Harnebring
Linesmen:
(Slovenia) Tilen Pahor
(Sweden) Daniel Persson

	0–1	12:30 – S. Gaffal (N. Kraus) (PP)
S. Kondratyev (D. Vovchenko, E. Tsvetkov) – 16:13	1–1
A. Svetlakov (D. Vovchenko) – 19:33	2–1
I. Nikolishin (A. Nekolenko) – 25:51	3–1
A. Protapovich (M. Lazarev) (PP) – 27:55	4–1
I. Zinovev (PP) – 31:23	5–1
E. Svechnikov (A. Protapovich) – 33:22	6–1
I. Nikolishin (I. Zinovev) – 33:32	7–1
A. Protapovich (M. Lazarev, E. Orlov) (PP) – 35:34	8–1
A. Mikulovich (I. Nikolishin, D. Sergeev) – 40:04	9–1
E. Svechnikov (M. Lazarev, E. Nasybullin) (PP) – 42:41	10–1
I. Nikolishin (I. Zinovev, A. Nekolenko) – 43:52	11–1

8 min
Penalties
16 min
53
Shots
12

January 17, 2012; 11:15	Austria	0–9 (0–4, 0–2, 0–3)	Canada	Tyrolean Ice Arena; Attendance: 749

Stefan Müller
Goalies
Sam Walsh
Referee:
(Norway) Stian Halm
Linesmen:
(Belarus) Andrei Haurylenka
(Germany) Benjamin Hoppe

0–1	0:40 – A. Brooks (N. Hébert, B. Martin)
0–2	2:16 – R. Burton (N. Yetman, J. Crossman)
0–3	6:15 – R. Gropp (E. Cornel) (PP)
0–4	12:07 – E. Cornel (R. Gropp)
0–5	16:42 – R. Gardiner (R. Gropp)
0–6	24:35 – G. James
0–7	38:31 – R. Duke (B. Martin, A. Brooks) (PP)
0–8	40:14 – R. Pilon
0–9	41:24 – R. Duke (B. Martin, J. Carrick)

10 min
Penalties
6 min
16
Shots
44

Austria fails to advance to the semifinals.

=== Skills challenge ===
Boys

Athlete(s)	Event	Qualification		Grand final	
Athlete(s)	Event	Points	Rank	Points	Rank
Stefan Gaffal	Individual skills	8	11	did not advance	

Girls

Athlete(s)	Event	Qualification		Grand final	
Athlete(s)	Event	Points	Rank	Points	Rank
Victoria Hummel	Individual skills	14	9	did not advance	

== Luge ==
=== Singles ===
Athlete	Event	Final			
Athlete	Event	Run 1	Run 2	Total	Rank
Armin Frauscher	Boys' singles	40.093	40.199	1:20.292	9
David Gleirscher	Boys' singles	40.218	40.602	1:20.820	17
Miriam-Stefanie Kastlunger	Girls' singles	40.107	40.090	1:20.197	1st place, gold medalist(s)
Nina Prock	Girls' singles	40.247	40.352	1:20.599	4

=== Doubles ===
Athlete	Event	Final			
Athlete	Event	Run 1	Run 2	Total	Rank
Lorenz Koller; Thomas Steu	Boys' doubles	43.013	42.999	1:26.012	6

=== Team ===
Athlete	Event	Final				
Athlete	Event	Boys'	Girls'	Doubles	Total	Rank
Miriam-Stefanie Kastlunger; Armin Frauscher; Thomas Steu; Lorenz Koller	Mixed Team Relay	44.676	46.902	47.285	2:18.863	3rd place, bronze medalist(s)

== Nordic combined ==
Athlete	Event	Ski jumping		Cross-country		Final	
Athlete	Event	Points	Rank	Deficit	Ski Time	Total Time	Rank
Paul Gerstgraser	Boys' individual	116.8	12	1:23	26:25.7	27:48.7	8

== Short Track ==
Boys

Athlete	Event	Quarterfinals		Semifinals		Finals	
Athlete	Event	Time	Rank	Time	Rank	Time	Rank
Dominic Andermann	Boys' 500 metres	48.312	4 qCD	47.751	2 qC	50.729	3
Dominic Andermann	Boys' 1000 metres	1:39.869	4 qCD	1:38.822	4 qD	1:39.097	3

Girls

Athlete	Event	Quarterfinals		Semifinals		Finals	
Athlete	Event	Time	Rank	Time	Rank	Time	Rank
Melanie Brantner	Girls' 500 metres	53.635	4 qCD	51.375	3 qD	51.150	2
Melanie Brantner	Girls' 1000 metres	1:46.275	4 qCD	1:47.437	3 qD	1:46.885	2

Mixed

Athlete	Event	Semifinals		Finals	
Athlete	Event	Time	Rank	Time	Rank
Team A Shim Suk-hee (KOR); Yoann Martinez (FRA); Melanie Brantner (AUT); Denis Ayrapetyan (RUS)	Mixed Team Relay	4:21.668	2 Q	4:26.352	3rd place, bronze medalist(s)
Team G Dariya Goncharova (KAZ); Su Min Yoon (KOR); Arianna Sighel (ITA); Dominic Andermann (AUT)	Mixed Team Relay	4:22.356	3 qB	PEN	

== Skeleton ==
Athlete	Event	Final			
Athlete	Event	Run 1	Run 2	Total	Rank
Stefan Geisler	Boys' individual	57.11	57.59	1:54.70	2nd place, silver medalist(s)

Athlete	Event	Final			
Athlete	Event	Run 1	Run 2	Total	Rank
Carina Mair	Girls' individual	CAN	58.40	58.40	2nd place, silver medalist(s)

== Ski jumping ==
Athlete	Event	1st round		2nd round		Overall	
Athlete	Event	Distance	Points	Distance	Points	Points	Rank
Michaela Kranzl	Girls' individual	50.0m	63.8	50.5m	64.5	128.3	13
Elias Tollinger	Boys' individual	74.0m	127.4	71.0m	118.2	245.6	7

Team w/Nordic Combined

Athlete	Event	1st Round	2nd Round	Total	Rank
Michaela Kranzl; Paul Gerstgraser; Elias Tollinger	Mixed Team	272.1	276.0	548.1	7

== Snowboarding ==
Athlete	Event	Qualifying			Semifinal			Final		
Athlete	Event	Run 1	Run 2	Rank	Run 1	Run 2	Rank	Run 1	Run 2	Rank
Roland Hörtnagl	Boys' halfpipe	42.25	10.75	12	did not advance					
Roland Hörtnagl	Boys' slopestyle	42.75	45.25	12				did not advance		
Philipp Kundratitz	Boys' halfpipe	31.25	18.00	14	did not advance					
Philipp Kundratitz	Boys' slopestyle	46.50	41.75	11				did not advance		

Athlete	Event	Qualifying			Semifinal			Final		
Athlete	Event	Run 1	Run 2	Rank	Run 1	Run 2	Rank	Run 1	Run 2	Rank
Birgit Rofner	Girls' slopestyle	59.75	52.75	9 Q				33.50	49.50	8
Johanna Sternat	Girls' halfpipe	10.25	DNS	15	did not advance					
Johanna Sternat	Girls' slopestyle	53.50	51.50	11				did not advance		

== Speed skating ==
=== Boys ===
Athlete	Event	Race 1	Race 2	Total	Rank
Thomas Petutschnigg	Boys' 500 m	41.44	41.73	83.17	13
Thomas Petutschnigg	Boys' Mass Start			7:20.39	13
Manuel Vogl	Boys' 1500 m			2:05.32	13
Manuel Vogl	Boys' 3000 m			4:27.27	10
Manuel Vogl	Boys' Mass Start			7:14.51	8

== See also ==
- Austria at the 2012 Summer Olympics
