= Luge at the 2012 Winter Youth Olympics – Girls' singles =

Girls' singles at the I Winter Youth Olympic Games
- Venue: Olympic Sliding Centre Innsbruck
- Dates: 16 January
- Competitors: 24 from 15 nations
- Winning time: 1:20.197

Medalists
1st place, gold medalist(s)		Miriam Kastlunger	Germany
2nd place, silver medalist(s)		Saskia Langer	Germany
3rd place, bronze medalist(s)		Ulla Zirne	Latvia

The girls' singles luge at the 2012 Winter Youth Olympics took place on 16 January at the Olympic Sliding Centre Innsbruck.

== Results ==
The first run was held at 14:00 and the second run at 15:35.

Rank	Bib	Athlete	Country	Run 1	Rank 1	Run 2	Rank 2	Total	Behind
1st place, gold medalist(s)	9	Miriam Kastlunger	Austria	40.107	2	40.090	1	1:20.197	
2nd place, silver medalist(s)	3	Saskia Langer	Germany	40.056	1	40.358	5	1:20.414	+0.217
3rd place, bronze medalist(s)	11	Ulla Zirne	Latvia	40.184	3	40.295	2	1:20.479	+0.282
4	12	Nina Prock	Austria	40.247	4	40.352	4	1:20.599	+0.402
5	5	Summer Britcher	United States	40.321	5	40.309	3	1:20.630	+0.433
6	2	Andrea Vötter	Italy	40.352	6	40.393	6	1:20.745	+0.548
7	6	Ekaterina Katnikova	Russia	40.441	7	40.502	8	1:20.943	+0.746
8	23	Gry Martine Mostue	Norway	40.757	8	40.760	10	1:21.517	+1.320
9	10	Olena Stetskiv	Ukraine	40.837	11	40.800	11	1:21.637	+1.440
10	1	Vendula Kotenová	Czech Republic	40.809	10	40.857	12	1:21.666	+1.469
11	4	Tara Disturnal	Canada	40.793	9	40.903	13	1:21.696	+1.499
12	18	Natalia Biesiadzka	Poland	41.044	13	40.921	15	1:21.965	+1.768
13	20	Galyna Kurechko	Ukraine	41.107	15	40.916	14	1:22.023	+1.826
14	13	Raychel Germaine	United States	40.856	12	41.324	18	1:22.180	+1.983
15	14	Ana Maria Şovăială	Romania	41.233	17	41.134	16	1:22.367	+2.170
16	22	Elena Poştoacă	Romania	41.125	16	41.325	19	1:22.450	+2.253
17	15	Tatiana Zifčáková	Slovakia	41.080	14	41.727	21	1:22.807	+2.610
18	17	Karoline Frimo Melås	Norway	41.604	19	41.240	17	1:22.844	+2.647
19	24	Nikola Drajnová	Slovakia	41.574	18	41.326	20	1:22.900	+2.703
20	7	Victoria Demchenko	Russia	43.006	22	40.478	7	1:23.484	+3.287
21	19	Petra Petko	Croatia	42.094	20	41.780	22	1:23.874	+3.677
22	21	Ema Bago	Croatia	42.351	21	42.379	23	1:24.730	+4.533
23	8	Maria Messner	Italy	44.728	23	40.550	9	1:25.278	+5.081
	16	Darya Kudryavtseva	Kazakhstan	Did not finish		Did not start			
