= Alpine skiing at the 2012 Winter Youth Olympics – Parallel mixed team =

Parallel mixed team at the I Winter Youth Olympic Games
- Venue: Patscherkofel
- Date: 17 January
- Competitors: 32 from 8 nations

Medalists
1st place, gold medalist(s)		Martina Rettenwender; Marco Schwarz; Christina Ager; Mathias Elmar Graf	Austria
2nd place, silver medalist(s)		Nora Grieg Christensen; Martin Fjeldberg; Mina Fürst Holtmann; Marcus Monsen	Norway
3rd place, bronze medalist(s)		Estelle Alphand; Victor Schuller; Clara Direz; Leny Herpin	France

The Parallel mixed team competition of the alpine skiing events at the 2012 Winter Youth Olympics in Innsbruck, Austria, was held on January 18, at Patscherkofel. 8 teams different countries took part in this event.

== Nations ==
Seed	Country	Athlete	Gender
1	Switzerland	Jasmina Suter; Ian Gut; Luana Flütsch; Sandro Simonet	F M F M
2	Austria	Martina Rettenwender; Marco Schwarz; Christina Ager; Mathias Elmar Graf	F M F M
3	France	Estelle Alphand; Victor Schuller; Clara Direz; Leny Herpin	F M F M
4	Italy	Veronica Olivieri; Davide Da Villa; Jasmine Fiorano; Hannes Zingerle	F M F M
5	Germany	Alisa Krauss; Nikolaus Ertl; Jenny Reinold; Lucas Krahnert	F M F M
6	Slovenia	Claudia Seidl; Štefan Hadalin; Saša Brezovnik; Miha Hrobat	F M F M
7	Canada	Mikaela Tommy; Martin Grasic; Roni Remme; Lambert Quezel	F M F M
8	Norway	Nora Grieg Christensen; Martin Fjeldberg; Mina Fürst Holtmann; Marcus Monsen	F M F M

== Bracket ==
The race started at 11:15.

Quarter-finals
Switzerland	1
Norway	2
Italy	3
Germany	0
France	2*
Slovenia	2
Austria	4
Canada	0

Quarterfinals
Italy	2
Norway	2*
Austria	2*
France	2

Semifinals
Austria	3
Norway	1
Third place
France	3
Italy	1
