= Bobsleigh at the 2012 Winter Youth Olympics – Two-boys =

Two-boys at the I Winter Youth Olympic Games
- Venue: Olympic Sliding Centre Innsbruck
- Date: January 22
- Competitors: 20 from 10 nations
- Winning time: 1:49.14

Medalists
1st place, gold medalist(s)		Patrick Baumgartner; Alessandro Grande	Italy
2nd place, silver medalist(s)		Benjamin Maier; Robert Ofensberger	Austria
3rd place, bronze medalist(s)		Rudy Rinaldi; Jérémy Torre	Monaco

The Two-boys competition of the bobsleigh events at the 2012 Winter Youth Olympics in Innsbruck, Austria, was held on January 22, at the Olympic Sliding Centre Innsbruck. 20 athletes from 10 countries took part in this event.

== Results ==
The runs was started at 11:30.

Rank	Bib	Country	Athletes	Run 1	Run 2	Total	Behind
1st place, gold medalist(s)	1	Italy	Patrick Baumgartner; Alessandro Grande	54.31	54.83	1:49.14	–
2nd place, silver medalist(s)	3	Austria	Benjamin Maier; Robert Ofensberger	54.63	54.60	1:49.23	+0.09
3rd place, bronze medalist(s)	2	Monaco	Rudy Rinaldi; Jérémy Torre	54.66	54.65	1:49.31	+0.17
4	5	Latvia	Oskars Ķibermanis; Elvis Kamšs	54.80	54.57	1:49.37	+0.23
5	10	Great Britain	Olly Biddulph; James Lelliott	54.54	54.87	1:49.41	+0.27
6	4	Germany	Philipp Mölter; Richard Oelsner	54.49	54.93	1:49.42	+0.28
7	6	United States	Codie Bascue; Jake Peterson	54.67	54.98	1:49.65	+0.51
8	7	Russia	Kirill Chigvintsev; Ivan Tarasov	54.95	55.00	1:49.95	+0.81
9	9	Canada	Payton Berezowski; Clay Sparks	55.28	55.26	1:50.54	+1.40
10	8	South Korea	Choi Jun-won; Choi Min-seo	55.81	55.43	1:51.24	+2.10
