= Speed skating at the 2012 Winter Youth Olympics – Boys' 500 metres =

Boys' 500 metres at the I Winter Youth Olympic Games
- Venue: Eisschnellaufbahn
- Date: January 14, 2012
- Competitors: 16 from 13 nations
- Winning time: 75.50

Medalists
1st place, gold medalist(s)		Liu An	China
2nd place, silver medalist(s)		Roman Dubovik	Belarus
3rd place, bronze medalist(s)		Toshihiro Kakui	Japan

The boys' 500 metres speed skating competition of the Innsbruck 2012 Winter Youth Olympics was held at Eisschnellaufbahn on 14 January 2012.

== Results ==
The races were held at 12:36.

Rank	Name	Country	Pair	Lane	Race 1	Rank	Pair	Lane	Race 2	Rank	Total	Time Behind
1st place, gold medalist(s)	Liu An	China	5	i	37.66	1	8	o	37.84	1	75.50	
2nd place, silver medalist(s)	Roman Dubovik	Belarus	7	o	38.87	2	8	i	38.954	3	77.824	+2.324
3rd place, bronze medalist(s)	Toshihiro Kakui	Japan	5	o	38.88	3	7	i	38.947	2	77.827	+2.327
4	Vasiliy Pudushkin	Russia	6	o	38.92	4	6	i	39.16	5	78.08	+2.58
5	Stanislav Palkin	Kazakhstan	6	i	39.32	5	7	o	39.12	4	78.44	+2.94
6	Park Dai-han	South Korea	7	i	39.41	6	6	o	39.46	6	78.87	+3.37
7	Matteo Cotza	Italy	8	o	39.98	7	5	i	39.61	7	79.59	+4.09
8	Marcel Drwięga	Poland	2	i	40.35	10	3	o	39.95	8	80.30	+4.80
9	Henrik Fagerli Rukke	Norway	1	i	40.27	9	4	o	40.37	10	80.64	+5.14
10	Cristian Adrian Mocanu	Romania	2	o	40.49	11	4	i	40.23	9	80.72	+5.22
11	Maksim Dubovsky	Belarus	3	o	40.61	12	3	i	40.92	11	81.53	+6.03
12	Tuomas Rahnasto	Finland	3	i	41.58	14	2	o	41.22	12	82.80	+7.30
13	Thomas Petutschnigg	Austria	1	o	41.43	13	2	i	41.74	13	83.17	+7.67
14	Kenneth Stargardt	Germany	4	o	41.97	15	1	i	41.92	14	83.89	+8.39
15	Lasse Ahonen	Finland	4	i	42.59	16	1	o	42.16	15	84.75	+9.25
	Dmitriy Morozov	Kazakhstan	8	i	40.24	8	5	o	DNF		DNF	
