= Italy at the 2012 Winter Youth Olympics =

- IOC code: ITA
- NOC: Italian National Olympic Committee
- Website: www.coni.it

in Innsbruck
- Competitors: 41 in 15 sports
- Flag bearer: Florian Gruber
- Medals Ranked 12th: Gold 2 Silver 2 Bronze 1 Total 5

Winter Youth Olympics appearances
- 2012; 2016; 2020; 2024

Italy competed at the 2012 Winter Youth Olympics in Innsbruck, Austria. The Italian team consisted of 41 athletes competing in 15 different sports.

== Medalists ==
Medal	Name	Sport	Event	Date
Gold	Florian Gruber; Simon Kainzwaldner	Luge	Boys' doubles	16 Jan
Gold	Patrick Baumgartner; Alessandro Grande	Bobsleigh	Two-boys	22 Jan
Silver	Amos Mosaner; Denise Pimpini; Alessandro Zoppi; Arianna Losano	Curling	Mixed Team	18 Jan
Silver	Hannes Zingerle	Alpine skiing	Boys' giant slalom	19 Jan
Bronze	Nicole Martinelli	Short Track	Girls' 500m	19 Jan

== Alpine skiing ==
Boys

Athlete	Event	Final			
Athlete	Event	Run 1	Run 2	Total	Rank
Davide Da Villa	Slalom	39.97	40.52	1:20.49	4
Davide Da Villa	Giant slalom	DNF			
Davide Da Villa	Super-G			1:05.53	7
Davide Da Villa	Combined	1:04.65	DNF		
Hannes Zingerle	Slalom	DNF			
Hannes Zingerle	Giant slalom	57.54	54.56	1:52.10	2nd place, silver medalist(s)
Hannes Zingerle	Super-G			1:05.57	9
Hannes Zingerle	Combined	1:03.97	DNF		

Girls

Athlete	Event	Final			
Athlete	Event	Run 1	Run 2	Total	Rank
Jasmine Fiorano	Slalom	42.60	39.41	1:22.01	5
Jasmine Fiorano	Giant slalom	59.25	1:01.77	2:01.02	17
Jasmine Fiorano	Super-G			DNF	
Jasmine Fiorano	Combined	1:06.40	36.87	1:43.27	10
Veronica Olivieri	Slalom	DNF			
Veronica Olivieri	Giant slalom	59.86	59.95	1:59.81	12
Veronica Olivieri	Super-G			1:06.59	8
Veronica Olivieri	Combined	1:05.70	37.82	1:43.52	12

Team

Athlete	Event	Quarterfinals	Semifinals	Final	Rank
Veronica Olivieri; Davide Da Villa; Jasmine Fiorano; Hannes Zingerle	Parallel mixed team	Germany; W 3-0	Norway; L 2-2	France; L 1-3	4

== Biathlon ==
Boys

Athlete	Event	Final		
Athlete	Event	Time	Misses	Rank
Federico Di Francesco	Sprint	20:59.4	2	15
Federico Di Francesco	Pursuit	32:19.8	8	20
Xavier Guidetti	Sprint	20:40.2	2	11
Xavier Guidetti	Pursuit	31:53.1	8	16

Girls

Athlete	Event	Final		
Athlete	Event	Time	Misses	Rank
Anna Savin	Sprint	20:20.3	3	29
Anna Savin	Pursuit	34:06.8	6	29
Lisa Vittozzi	Sprint	18:42.8	1	8
Lisa Vittozzi	Pursuit	28:07.7	0	5

Mixed

Athlete	Event	Final		
Athlete	Event	Time	Misses	Rank
Lisa Vittozzi; Anna Savin; Federico Di Francesco; Xavier Guidetti	Mixed relay	1:15:46.6	0+11	5
Lisa Vittozzi; Alice Canclini; Xavier Guidetti; Manuel Perotti	Cross-Country-Biathlon Mixed Relay	1:07:05.7	0+7	11

== Bobsleigh ==
Boys

Athlete	Event	Final			
Athlete	Event	Run 1	Run 2	Total	Rank
Patrick Baumgartner; Alessandro Grande	Two-Boys	54.83	54.31	1:49.14	1st place, gold medalist(s)

Girls

Athlete	Event	Final			
Athlete	Event	Run 1	Run 2	Total	Rank
Mathilde Parodi; Valentina Margaglio	Two-Girls	56.15	56.26	1:52.41	5

== Cross country skiing ==
Boys

Athlete	Event	Final	
Athlete	Event	Time	Rank
Manuel Perotti	10km classical	31:22.5	14

Girls

Athlete	Event	Final	
Athlete	Event	Time	Rank
Alice Canclini	5km classical	16:50.6	24

Sprint

Athlete	Event	Qualification		Quarterfinal		Semifinal		Final	
Athlete	Event	Total	Rank	Total	Rank	Total	Rank	Total	Rank
Manuel Perotti	Boys' sprint	1:47.36	17 Q	2:03.2	6	did not advance			
Alice Canclini	Girls' sprint	2:00.11	7 Q	2:02.4	3	did not advance			

Mixed

Athlete	Event	Final		
Athlete	Event	Time	Misses	Rank
Lisa Vittozzi; Alice Canclini; Xavier Guidetti; Manuel Perotti	Cross-Country-Biathlon Mixed Relay	1:07:05.7	0+7	11

== Curling ==
Boys

- Skip: Amos Mosaner
- Second: Alessandro Zoppi

Girls

- Third: Denise Pimpini
- Lead: Arianna Losano

=== Mixed Team ===
Final Round Robin Standings

Red Group	Skip	W	L
Sweden	Rasmus Wranå	6	1
Canada	Thomas Scoffin	5	2
Japan	Shingo Usui	4	3
Italy	Amos Mosaner	4	3
Great Britain	Duncan Menzies	3	4
Russia	Mikhail Vaskov	3	4
Austria	Mathias Genner	2	5
Germany	Daniel Rothballer	1	6

==== Round-robin results ====
Draw 1

Sheet A	1	2	3	4	5	6	7	8	Final
Italy (Mosaner)	1	0	3	0	0	3	0	X	7
Russia (Vaskov)	0	1	0	1	0	0	1	X	3

Draw 2

Sheet B	1	2	3	4	5	6	7	8	Final
Japan (Usui)	0	0	0	2	0	3	0	X	5
Italy (Mosaner)	1	0	0	0	1	0	1	X	3

Draw 3

Sheet C	1	2	3	4	5	6	7	8	Final
Canada (Scoffin)	0	1	0	0	1	1	3	X	6
Italy (Mosaner)	0	0	0	0	0	0	0	X	0

Draw 4

Sheet A	1	2	3	4	5	6	7	8	Final
Sweden (Wranå)	2	1	0	0	0	1	1	0	5
Italy (Mosaner)	0	0	1	2	2	0	0	2	7

Draw 5

Sheet D	1	2	3	4	5	6	7	8	Final
Germany (Rothballer)	0	0	2	0	1	0	0	X	3
Italy (Mosaner)	2	1	0	1	0	1	4	X	9

Draw 6

Sheet B	1	2	3	4	5	6	7	8	Final
Italy (Mosaner)	1	0	0	2	0	2	0	0	5
Great Britain (Menzies)	0	0	3	0	1	0	2	1	7

Draw 7

Sheet C	1	2	3	4	5	6	7	8	Final
Italy (Mosaner)	2	0	0	2	2	0	0	X	6
Austria (Genner)	0	0	1	0	0	1	1	X	3

==== Quarterfinals ====
Sheet B	1	2	3	4	5	6	7	8	Final
Italy (Mosaner)	0	0	1	4	0	2	0	X	7
United States (Dropkin)	0	0	0	0	2	0	3	X	5

==== Semifinals ====
Sheet D	1	2	3	4	5	6	7	8	Final
Canada (Scoffin)	0	1	0	0	1	0	0	X	2
Italy (Mosaner)	2	0	1	3	0	1	1	X	8

==== Gold Medal Game ====
Sheet C	1	2	3	4	5	6	7	8	Final
Italy (Mosaner)	0	1	0	2	0	1	0	X	4
Switzerland (Brunner)	2	0	2	0	1	0	1	X	6

=== Mixed doubles ===
==== Round of 32 ====
Sheet D	1	2	3	4	5	6	7	8	Final
Mikhail Vaskov (RUS); Zuzana Hrůzová (CZE)	0	5	1	1	1	1	1	X	10
Marie Turmann (EST); Alessandro Zoppi (ITA)	3	0	0	0	0	0	0	X	3

Sheet D	1	2	3	4	5	6	7	8	Final
Kang Sue-yeon (KOR); Krystof Krupanský (CZE)	3	1	0	3	0	2	1	X	10
Daniel Rothballer (GER); Arianna Losano (ITA)	0	0	2	0	3	0	0	X	5

Sheet D	1	2	3	4	5	6	7	8	Final
Marek Černovský (CZE); Rachel Hannen (GBR)	0	2	1	2	0	0	2	1	8
Denise Pimpini (ITA); David Weyer (NZL)	2	0	0	0	2	1	0	0	5

Sheet D	1	2	3	4	5	6	7	8	Final
Alžběta Baudyšová (CZE); Bai Yang (CHN)	0	0	0	5	1	0	3	0	9
Amos Mosaner (ITA); Irena Brettbacher (AUT)	1	1	1	0	0	4	0	3	10

==== Round of 16 ====
Sheet B	1	2	3	4	5	6	7	8	Final
Yoo Min-hyeon (KOR); Mako Tamakuma (JPN)	2	0	3	1	1	0	2	X	9
Amos Mosaner (ITA); Irena Brettbacher (AUT)	0	1	0	0	0	3	0	X	4

== Figure skating ==
Boys

Athlete(s)	Event	SP/OD		FS/FD		Total	
Athlete(s)	Event	Points	Rank	Points	Rank	Points	Rank
Carlo Vittorio Palermo	Singles	39.29	12	86.26	10	125.55	12

Girls

Athlete(s)	Event	SP/OD		FS/FD		Total	
Athlete(s)	Event	Points	Rank	Points	Rank	Points	Rank
Micol Cristini	Singles	39.87	9	65.67	12	105.44	11

Pairs

Athlete(s)	Event	SP/OD		FS/FD		Total	
Athlete(s)	Event	Points	Rank	Points	Rank	Points	Rank
Jasmine Tessari; Stefano Colafato	Ice Dancing	38.00	7	50.15	8	88.15	8

Mixed

Athletes	Event	Boys'			Girls'			Ice Dance			Total	
Athletes	Event	Score	Rank	Points	Score	Rank	Points	Score	Rank	Points	Points	Rank
Team 3 Carlo Vittorio Palermo (ITA); Anais Ventard (FRA); Jana Cejkova/Alexandr Sinicyn (CZE)	Team Trophy	75.71	7	2	76.09	4	5	54.72	5	4	11	8
Team 7 Lee June-hyoung (KOR); Micol Cristini (ITA); Victoria-Laura Lohmus/Andrei Davodov (EST)	Team Trophy	109.30	3	6	65.60	6	3	45.60	6	3	12	7

== Freestyle skiing ==
Ski Cross

Athlete	Event	Qualifying		1/4 finals	Semifinals	Final
Athlete	Event	Time	Rank	Rank	Rank	Rank
Patrick Renner	Boys' ski cross	58.36	8	Cancelled		

== Ice hockey ==
Girls

Athlete(s)	Event	Qualification		Grand final	
Athlete(s)	Event	Points	Rank	Points	Rank
Agnese Tartaglione	Individual skills	15	7 Q	17	4

== Luge ==
Boys

Athlete	Event	Final			
Athlete	Event	Run 1	Run 2	Total	Rank
Simon Kainzwaldner	Boys' singles	40.222	40.104	1:20.326	10
Florian Gruber; Simon Kainzwaldner	Boys' doubles	42.590	42.604	1:25.194	1st place, gold medalist(s)

Girls

Athlete	Event	Final			
Athlete	Event	Run 1	Run 2	Total	Rank
Maria Messner	Girls' singles	44.728	40.550	1:25.278	23
Andrea Voetter	Girls' singles	40.352	40.393	1:20.745	6

Team

Athlete	Event	Final				
Athlete	Event	Boys'	Girls'	Doubles	Total	Rank
Andrea Voetter; Daniel Gatterer; Florian Gruber; Simon Kainzwaldner	Mixed Team Relay	44.932	47.943	46.982	2:19.857	5

== Nordic combined ==
Boys

Athlete	Event	Ski jumping		Cross-country		Final	
Athlete	Event	Points	Rank	Deficit	Ski Time	Total Time	Rank
Raffaele Buzzi	Boys' individual	119.2	11	1:13	25:50.4	27:03.4	5

== Short track speed skating ==
Boys

Athlete	Event	Quarterfinals		Semifinals		Finals	
Athlete	Event	Time	Rank	Time	Rank	Time	Rank
Milan Grugni	Boys' 500 metres	1:05.394	3 Q*	46.685	4 qB	49.630	4
Milan Grugni	Boys' 1000 metres	1:33.540	2 Q	1:33.183	4 qB	1:40.766	1

- * Given advantage due to fall caused by another skater.

Girls

Athlete	Event	Quarterfinals		Semifinals		Finals	
Athlete	Event	Time	Rank	Time	Rank	Time	Rank
Nicole Martinelli	Girls' 500 metres	46.390	2 Q	46.679	2 Q	46.594	3rd place, bronze medalist(s)
Nicole Martinelli	Girls' 1000 metres	1:39.809	2 Q	1:36.620	3 qB	1:47.451	1
Arianna Sighel	Girls' 500 metres	PEN		did not advance			
Arianna Sighel	Girls' 1000 metres	1:38.102	2 Q	1:37.609	4 qB	2:13.756	2

Mixed

Athlete	Event	Semifinals		Finals	
Athlete	Event	Time	Rank	Time	Rank
Team C Nicole Martinelli (ITA); Milan Grugni (ITA); Timea Toth (HUN); Tamas Farkas (HUN)	Mixed Team Relay	4:28.026	3 qB	4:29.686	2
Team G Dariya Goncharova (KAZ); Su Min Yoon (KOR); Arianna Sighel (ITA); Dominic Andermann (AUT)	Mixed Team Relay	4:22.356	3 qB	PEN	

== Skeleton ==
Boys

Athlete	Event	Final			
Athlete	Event	Run 1	Run 2	Total	Rank
Ferdinando Mulassano	Boys' individual	59.86	59.94	1:59.80	11

Girls

Athlete	Event	Final			
Athlete	Event	Run 1	Run 2	Total	Rank
Guendalina Bergonzoni	Girls' individual	CAN	1:01.57	1:01.57	11

== Ski jumping ==
Boys

Athlete	Event	1st Jump		2nd Jump		Overall	
Athlete	Event	Distance	Points	Distance	Points	Points	Rank
Daniele Varesco	Boys' individual	67.5m	107.8	67.0m	108.1	215.9	10

Girls

Athlete	Event	1st Jump		2nd Jump		Overall	
Athlete	Event	Distance	Points	Distance	Points	Points	Rank
Veronica Gianmoena	Girls' individual	51.0m	66.2	55.5m	76.0	142.2	12

Team w/Nordic Combined

Athlete	Event	1st Round	2nd Round	Total	Rank
Veronica Gianmoena; Raffaele Buzzi; Daniele Varesco	Mixed Team	222.8	266.8	489.6	10

== Snowboarding ==
Girls

Athlete	Event	Qualifying			Semifinal			Final		
Athlete	Event	Run 1	Run 2	Rank	Run 1	Run 2	Rank	Run 1	Run 2	Rank
Maria Delfina Maiocco	Girls' halfpipe	28.50	58.25	6 q	74.25	83.75	2 Q	69.00	44.25	6
Maria Delfina Maiocco	Girls' slopestyle	55.25	74.75	7 Q				47.25	54.25	6

== Speed skating ==
Boys

Athlete	Event	Race 1	Race 2	Total	Rank
Matteo Cotza	Boys' 500 m	39.98	39.61	79.59	7
Matteo Cotza	Boys' Mass Start			LAP	

Girls

Athlete	Event	Race 1	Race 2	Total	Rank
Laura De Candido	Girls' 500 m	45.48	45.49	90.97	11
Laura De Candido	Girls' Mass Start			LAP	
Gloria Malfatti	Girls' 500 m	44.60	44.12	88.72	7
Gloria Malfatti	Girls' 3000 m			4:59.97	10
Gloria Malfatti	Girls' Mass Start			6:03.91	7

== See also ==
- Italy at the 2012 Summer Olympics
