= Monaco at the 2012 Winter Youth Olympics =

- IOC code: MON
- NOC: Monaco Olympic Committee
- Website: www.comite-olympique.mc

in Innsbruck
- Competitors: 3 in 2 sports
- Flag bearer: Rudy Rinaldi
- Medals Ranked 29th: Gold 0 Silver 0 Bronze 1 Total 1

Winter Youth Olympics appearances
- 2012; 2016; 2020; 2024

Monaco competed at the 2012 Winter Youth Olympics in Innsbruck, Austria. The Monegasque team was made up of three athletes in two sports.

== Medalists ==
Medal	Name	Sport	Event	Date
Bronze	Rudy Rinaldi; Jeremy Torre	Bobsleigh	Two-boys	22 Jan

== Alpine skiing ==
Monaco qualified one boy in alpine skiing.

Boy

Athlete	Event	Final			
Athlete	Event	Run 1	Run 2	Total	Rank
Bryan Pelassy	Slalom	48.19	DNF		
Bryan Pelassy	Giant slalom	1:06.17	1:01.56	2:07.73	33
Bryan Pelassy	Super-G			1:16.51	38
Bryan Pelassy	Combined	1:13.58	45.16	1:58.74	30

== Bobsleigh ==
Monaco will send a pair of athletes to compete in the two-man bobsled event.

Athlete	Event	Final			
Athlete	Event	Run 1	Run 2	Total	Rank
Rudy Rinaldi; Jeremy Torre	Two-boys	54.65	54.66	1:41.39	3rd place, bronze medalist(s)

== See also ==
- Monaco at the 2012 Summer Olympics
