= Nordic combined at the 2012 Winter Youth Olympics – Individual =

Boys' individual at the I Winter Youth Olympic Games
- Venue: Seefeld Arena
- Date: January 15
- Competitors: 17 from 17 nations
- Winning time: 26:31.4

Medalists
1st place, gold medalist(s)		Tomáš Portyk	Czech Republic
2nd place, silver medalist(s)		Ilkka Herola	Finland
3rd place, bronze medalist(s)		Go Yamamoto	Japan

The individual competition of the Nordic combined events at the 2012 Winter Youth Olympics in Innsbruck, Austria, was held on January 15, at the Seefeld Arena with one ski jump and a 10-kilometre cross-country race. 17 athletes from 17 countries took part in this event.

== Results ==
=== Ski jumping ===
Rank	Bib	Name	Country	Distance (m)	Points	Time difference
1	17	Tom Lubitz	Germany	78.0	137.5	
2	6	Go Yamamoto	Japan	75.5	132.5	+0:20
3	15	Harald Johnas Riiber	Norway	75.0	131.3	+0:25
4	9	Ilkka Herola	Finland	76.0	130.2	+0:29
5	4	Tomáš Portyk	Czech Republic	75.0	129.8	+0:31
6	16	Luka Pintarič	Slovenia	72.5	125.8	+0:47
7	7	Jan Kirchhofer	Switzerland	73.5	125.7	+0:47
8	10	Kristjan Ilves	Estonia	73.0	124.5	+0:52
9	12	Nathaniel Mah	Canada	72.0	122.6	+1:00
10	5	Michał Pytel	Poland	72.5	120.8	+1:07
11	13	Raffaele Buzzi	Italy	71.0	119.2	+1:13
12	14	Paul Gerstgraser	Austria	70.0	116.8	+1:23
13	2	Colton Kissell	United States	67.5	105.3	+2:09
14	3	Tom Balland	France	66.0	104.7	+2:11
15	11	Roman Terekhin	Russia	58.5	85.2	+3:29
16	8	Vitaliy Marchenko	Ukraine	58.0	80.0	+3:50
17	1	Nikita Maladsou	Belarus	52.0	66.1	+4:46

=== Cross-country ===
Rank	Bib	Name	Country	Start time	Cross country time	Cross country rank	Finish time
1st place, gold medalist(s)	5	Tomáš Portyk	Czech Republic	0:31	26:00.4	2	26:31.4
2nd place, silver medalist(s)	4	Ilkka Herola	Finland	0:29	26:05.2	3	+2.8
3rd place, bronze medalist(s)	2	Go Yamamoto	Japan	0:20	26:19.9	4	+8.5
4	1	Tom Lubitz	Germany	0:00	26:57.6	7	+26.2
5	11	Raffaele Buzzi	Italy	1:13	25:50.4	1	+32.0
6	3	Harald Johnas Riiber	Norway	0:25	27:05.0	8	+58.6
7	8	Kristjan Ilves	Estonia	0:52	26:50.9	6	+1:11.5
8	12	Paul Gerstgraser	Austria	1:23	26:25.7	5	+1:17.3
9	7	Jan Kirchhofer	Switzerland	0:47	27:52.8	9	+2:08.4
10	6	Luka Pintarič	Slovenia	0:47	28:43.8	11	+2:59.4
11	9	Nathaniel Mah	Canada	1:00	28:35.0	10	+3:03.6
12	14	Tom Balland	France	2:11	28:52.7	12	+4:32.3
13	13	Colton Kissell	United States	2:09	29:11.6	15	+4:49.2
14	15	Roman Terekhin	Russia	3:29	28:56.5	13	+5:54.1
15	17	Nikita Maladsou	Belarus	4:46	29:06.7	14	+7:21.3
16	16	Vitaliy Marchenko	Ukraine	3:50	30:28.1	16	+7:46.7
	10	Michał Pytel	Poland	1:07	Did not finish		
