= Harald Johnas Riiber =

Norwegian Nordic combined skier

Harald Johnas Riiber (born 8 April 1995) is a Norwegian Nordic combined skier.

Riiber finished sixth at the 2012 Winter Youth Olympics. At the 2014 Junior World Championships he managed an eighth place, and at the 2015 Junior World Championships he competed in three events, recording an individual 6th place and a team competition bronze medal.

He made his Continental Cup debut in 2013 and recorded his first podium in February 2017 in Planica. He made his World Cup debut in December 2015 in Lillehammer, and finished among the top 30 for the first time in February 2017 with a 26th place in Pyeongchang. The next week he reached the top 20 for the first time, in Sapporo.

He represents the sports club IL Heming. He is an older brother of Jarl Magnus Riiber.
