= Jan Kralj =

Slovenian snowboarder (born 1995)

Jan Kralj (born 3 March 1995) is a Slovenian snowboarder. He has competed at the 2014 Winter Olympics in Sochi.
