= Jaroslav Dejmal =

Czech confectioner (1892–1975)

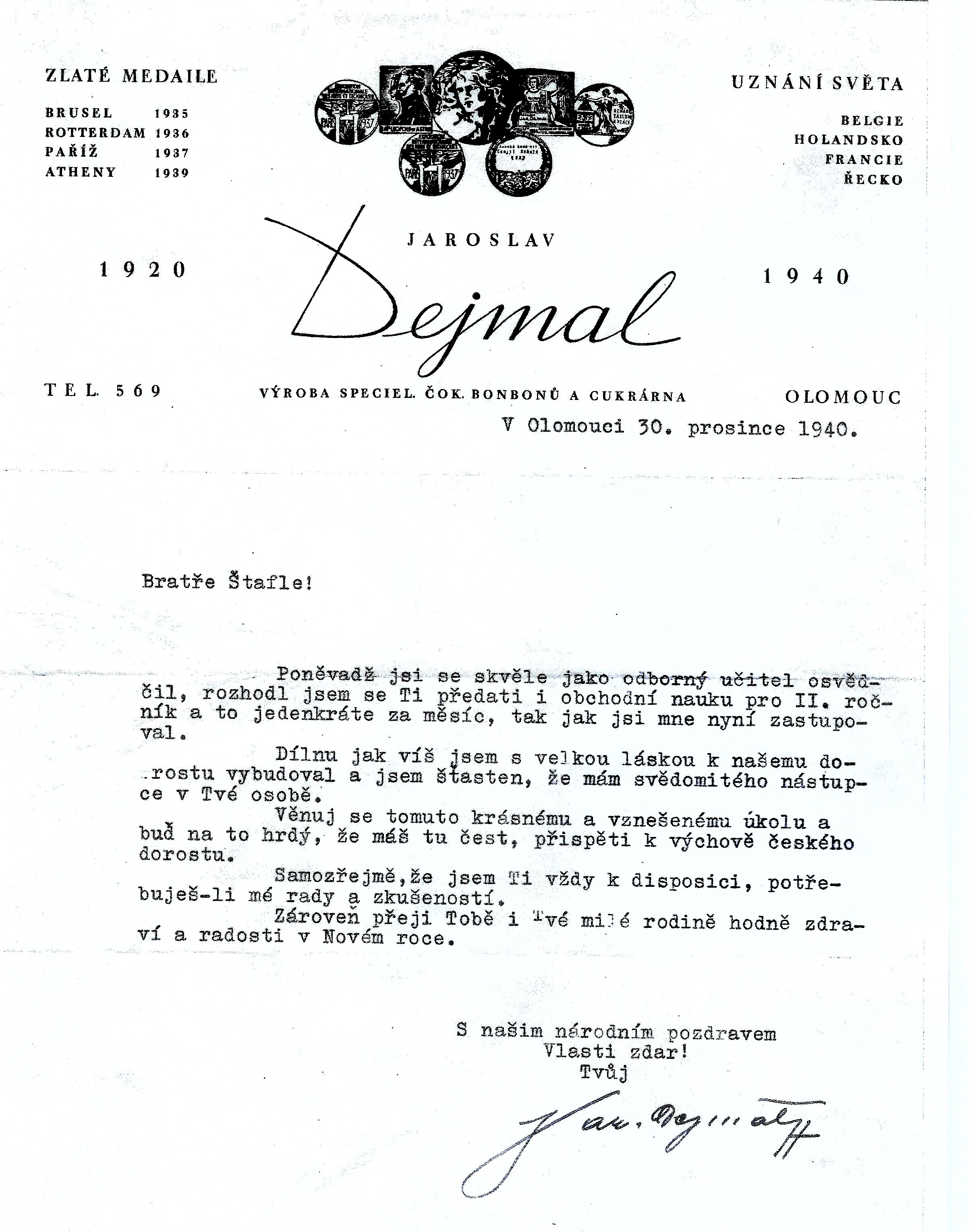
- Example of Dejmal's stationary
- Born: 2 May 1892; Jihlava, Austria-Hungary
- Died: 3 October 1975 (aged 83); Olomouc, Czechoslovakia
- Years active: 1920–1960
- Employer: Dejmal Confectionary
- Spouse: Helena Přikrylová (m. 1922)

Jaroslav Dejmal (2 May 1892 – 3 October 1975) was a Czech confectioner and businessman.

== Early life ==
Dejmal was born on 2 May 1892, in Jihlava, Austria-Hungary to Leopold Dejmal, a shoemaker, and was the eldest of eight children. He worked an apprenticeship, and travelled to Vienna in 1910, studying under renowned confectionery companies Louis Lehmann and Julius Menschl. In 1913, he began military service in the Austro-Hungarian Air Force and was transferred to Olomouc. Thanks to his training at Sokol there, he was able to get a job with Hrachovina a Večerka, which produced confectionary goods. In 1922, he married Helena Přikrylová, a bank teller.

== Career ==
Dejmal was unhappy with his first job out of the military, and opened up his own confectionery on 28 října Street in 1920. He made many goods and emphasized quality. His company began with a rocky start, but eventually flourished, requiring the company to expand production due to high demand for their products. Notable people including Eduard Haken, Slávka Budínová, Oldřich Nový, Jaroslav Pospíšil, and Beno Blachut frequented his shop. His goods won competitions in Brussels, Paris, and Athens.

His business heavily suffered during the Second World War due to product shortages from disrupted supply chains. Following nationalization of Czechoslovakia's industries, the company was unable to return to its quality of goods under a free market. It was connected to the national hotel enterprise, which employed Dejmal as a manager until 1960, and had received permission to use the Dejmal name. The company holding the confectionary business was privatized with the Fall of the Iron Curtain, but did not feature the Dejmal name, as his widow did not approve of its usage.

He died in Olomouc in 1975.
