= Emilee Anderson =

American ski jumper

Personal information
- Full name: Emilee Anderson
- Born: December 13, 1995 (age 30)

Sport
- Sport: Skiing

World Cup career
- Seasons: 2012–2016

Emilee Anderson (born December 13, 1995) is an American ski jumper who has been competing since 2011. She participated at the 2012 Winter Youth Olympics.
