= Ben Ferguson (snowboarder) =

American snowboarder (born 1995)

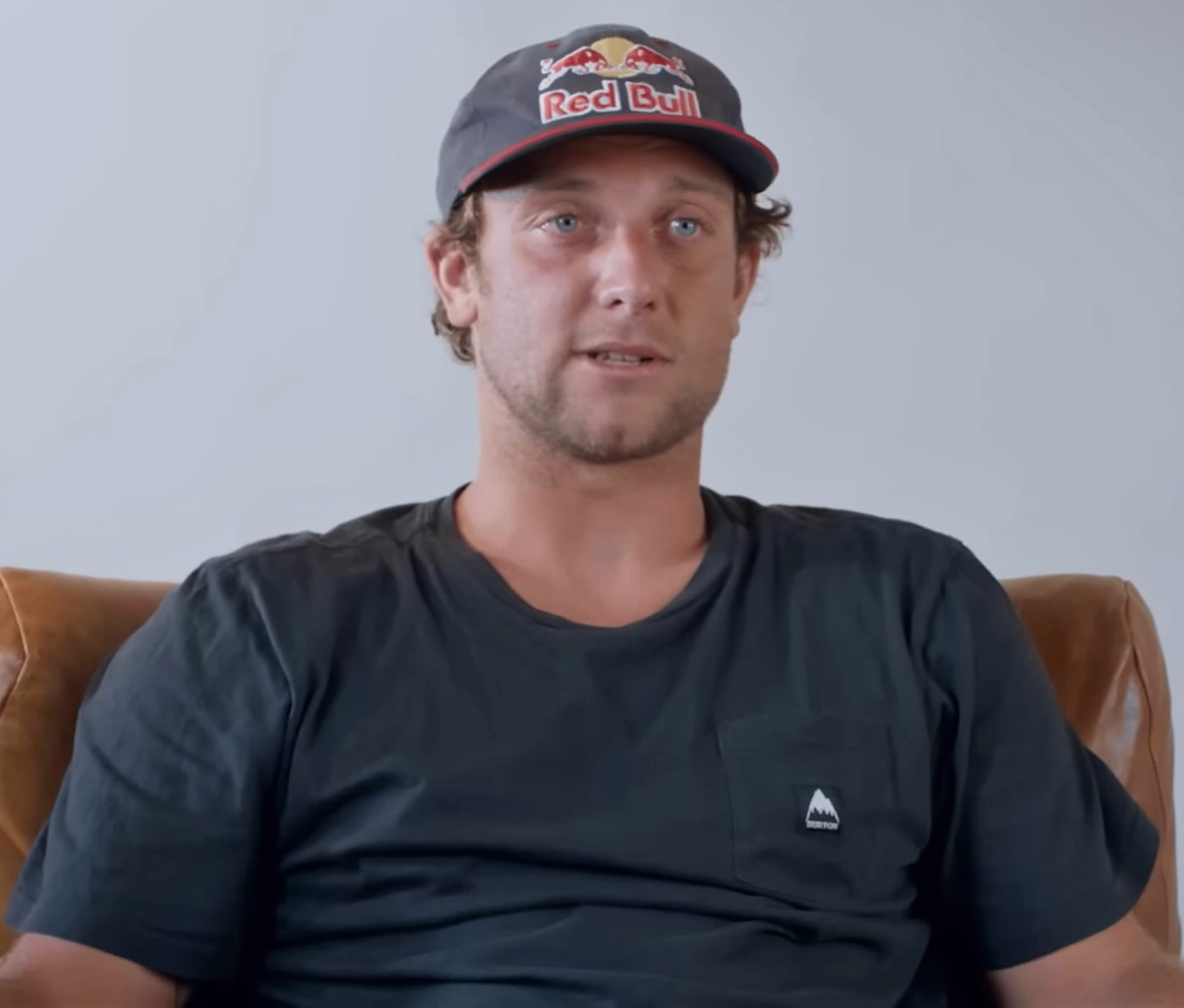
- Ferguson discusses his film Fleeting Time in 2022

Personal information
- Born: January 21, 1995 (age 31) Boise, Idaho, U.S.
- Height: 5 ft 9 in (175 cm)
- Weight: 165 lb (75 kg)

Sport
- Country: United States
- Sport: Snowboarding
- Club: Alaska Pacific University Nordic Center
Medal record
Men's snowboarding
Representing the United States
Winter X Games
Silver medal – second place	2016 Aspen	SuperPipe
Bronze medal – third place	2018 Aspen	SuperPipe

Ben Ferguson (born January 21, 1995) is an American snowboarder from Bend, Oregon.

== Career ==
He won the silver medal at the Winter X Games XX and the bronze medal at the Winter X Games XXII. In 2018, he was named to the U.S. Olympic Snowboarding Team for the 2018 Winter Olympics.

Ben spends most of his summers in Mt. Hood, Oregon teaching young snowboarders during his signature sessions at High Cascade Snowboard Camp. He is sponsored by 10 Barrel Brewing, Burton Snowboards, Redbull, Mt. Bachelor, Anon Optics, and Crabgrab.

== Snowboarding career ==
Men's Halfpipe Competitions

- 2014 X Games Aspen - 5th
- 2015 X Games Aspen - 12th
- 2016 X Games Aspen - 2nd
- 2016 Burton U.S. Open - 2nd
- 2017 U.S. Grand Prix Copper Mountain - 2nd
- 2017 X Games Aspen - 7th
- 2017 Dew Tour - 3rd
- 2018 X Games Aspen - 3rd
- 2018 Burton U.S. Open - 4th
- 2018 U.S. Grand Prix Aspen - 2nd
- 2018 PyeongChang Winter Olympics - 4th
- 2019 X Games Aspen - 6th

Other Career Highlights

- 2012 Innsbruck Youth Olympics - 1st Halfpipe, 2nd Slopestyle
- 2013 Legendary Banked Slalom Mount Baker
- 2015 Red Bull Double Pipe - 1st place double's contest
- Three-time winner of Danny Davis' Peace Park
