= Natálie Dejmková =

Czech ski jumper

Natálie Dejmková (born 15 September 1996) is a Czech former ski jumper.

== Life ==
Dejmková was born on 15 September 1996.

== Career ==
She would have competed in the FIS Nordic World Ski Championships 2009 in Liberec, but could not because she fell heavily during the training. She would have been the youngest athlete ever to compete in a FIS Nordic World Ski Championship.

Beside of that she has competed in the Continental Cup and Women's World Cup several times. She was one of the most promising young athletes in Czech Republic. She competes for the club SK Ještěd Liberec. Dejmková had her last international competition at the 2013 European Youth Olympic Winter Festival.
