= Patrick Caldwell (skier) =

American cross-country skier (born 1994)

Patrick Caldwell (born February 18, 1994, in Lyme, New Hampshire) is an American cross-country skier and son of Tim Caldwell. He is an alumnus of Dartmouth College, where he studied geography.

Caldwell competed for the United States at the 2018 Winter Olympics. He is also the cousin of Olympic skier Sophie Caldwell.

He announced his retirement from competitive skiing in November, 2019.
