= Magdalena Pałasz =

Polish ski jumper

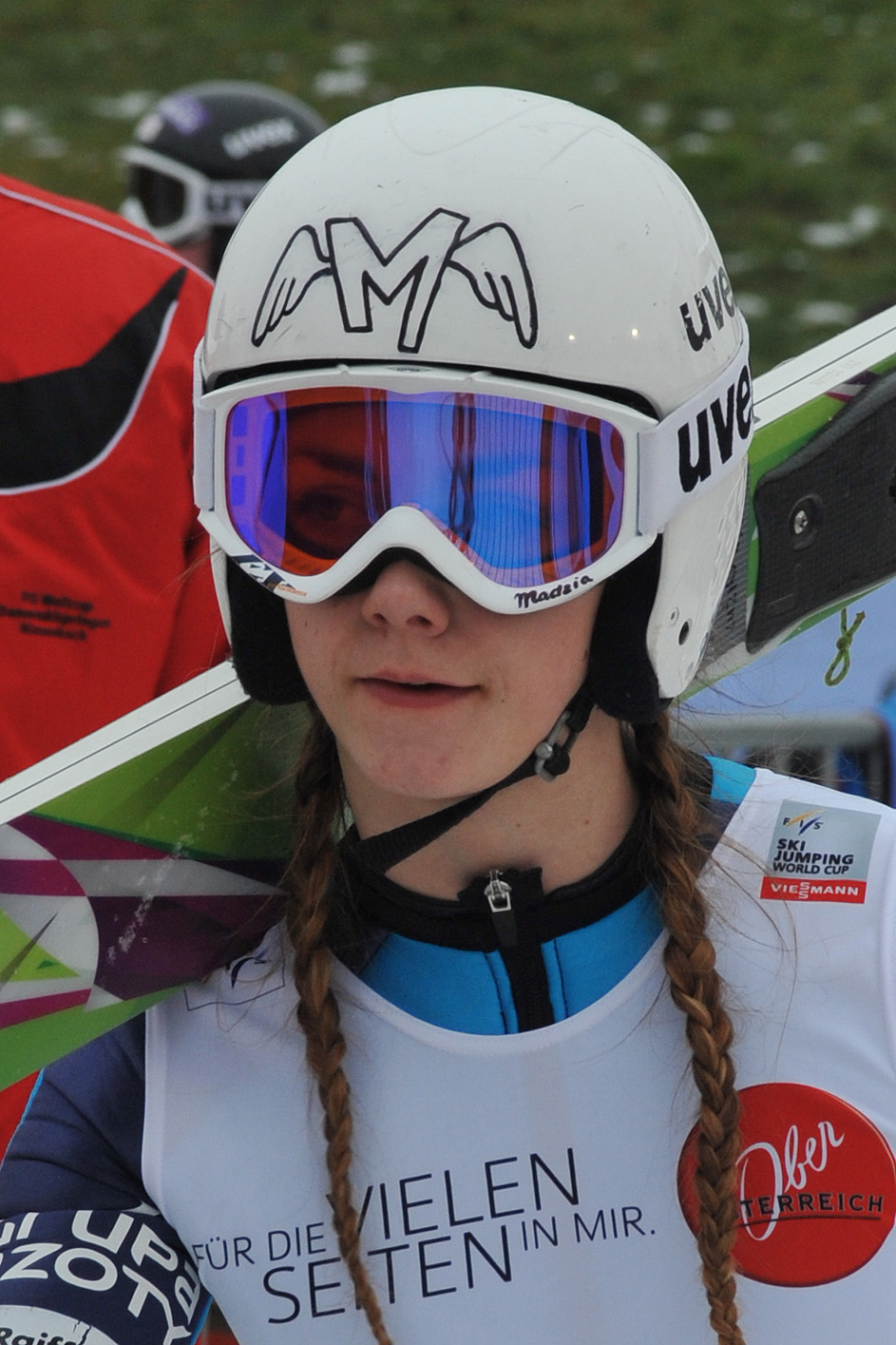

Personal information
- Nationality: Poland
- Born: August 6, 1995 (age 30) Sanok, Poland
- Height: 163 cm (5 ft 4 in)

Sport
- Sport: Skiing
- Club: UKS Sołtysianie Stare Bystre

World Cup career
- Indiv. starts: 11
- Indiv. podiums: 0
- Indiv. wins: 0
- Team podiums: 0
- Team wins: 0

Achievements and titles
- Personal best: 128.5 m

Magdalena Pałasz (born August 29, 1995 in Sanok) is a Polish ski jumper and member of the Polish national team. She represents the club UKS Sołtysianie Stare Bystre. She was the first Polish woman to score points in the World Cup and became the first Polish national champion in women's ski jumping (2014). Since 2021, she has also worked as an expert commentator for Eurosport and TVN during ski jumping competitions.

== Career overview ==
=== 2011/2012 season ===
Pałasz made her debut in official international competitions on August 13, 2011, during a Continental Cup event. She placed 62nd in the competition in Bischofsgrün.

=== 2013/2014 season ===
On August 30, 2013, in Frenštát pod Radhoštěm, she achieved her first top-ten finish in an FIS Cup event, placing 7th and scoring her first career points in the FIS Cup.

On December 6, 2013, she debuted in the World Cup, finishing 14th in a mixed team event in Lillehammer, where she competed alongside Joanna Szwab, Maciej Kot, and Kamil Stoch.

On January 10, 2014, she placed 7th in an Alpen Cup competition in Predazzo. The following day, she finished 11th. On January 28, in the same location, she competed in the women's event at the Junior World Championships, placing 26th with jumps measuring 80.5 m.

On February 1, 2014, in Hinzenbach, she advanced to the second round of a World Cup competition for the first time, placing 28th with jumps of 72 and 74.5 meters. This achievement made her the first Polish woman in history to score World Cup points.

On March 1, 2014, in Falun, she earned her first Continental Cup points, finishing 4th. She placed 7th in the second event.

On October 11, 2014, she won the gold medal in the first-ever 2014 Polish Summer Championships in Ski Jumping on the K-70 (HS-77) hill in Szczyrk.
