= Short-track speed skating at the Winter Youth Olympics =

Short track speed skating at a multi-sport event

- Governing body: ISU
- Events: 7 (men: 3; womens: 3; mixed: 1)

Games
- 2012; 2016; 2020; 2024

Short track speed skating is one of the sports featured at the Winter Youth Olympics. It has been part of the games since the inaugural edition in 2012.

== Medal summaries ==
=== Boys' ===
==== 500 m ====
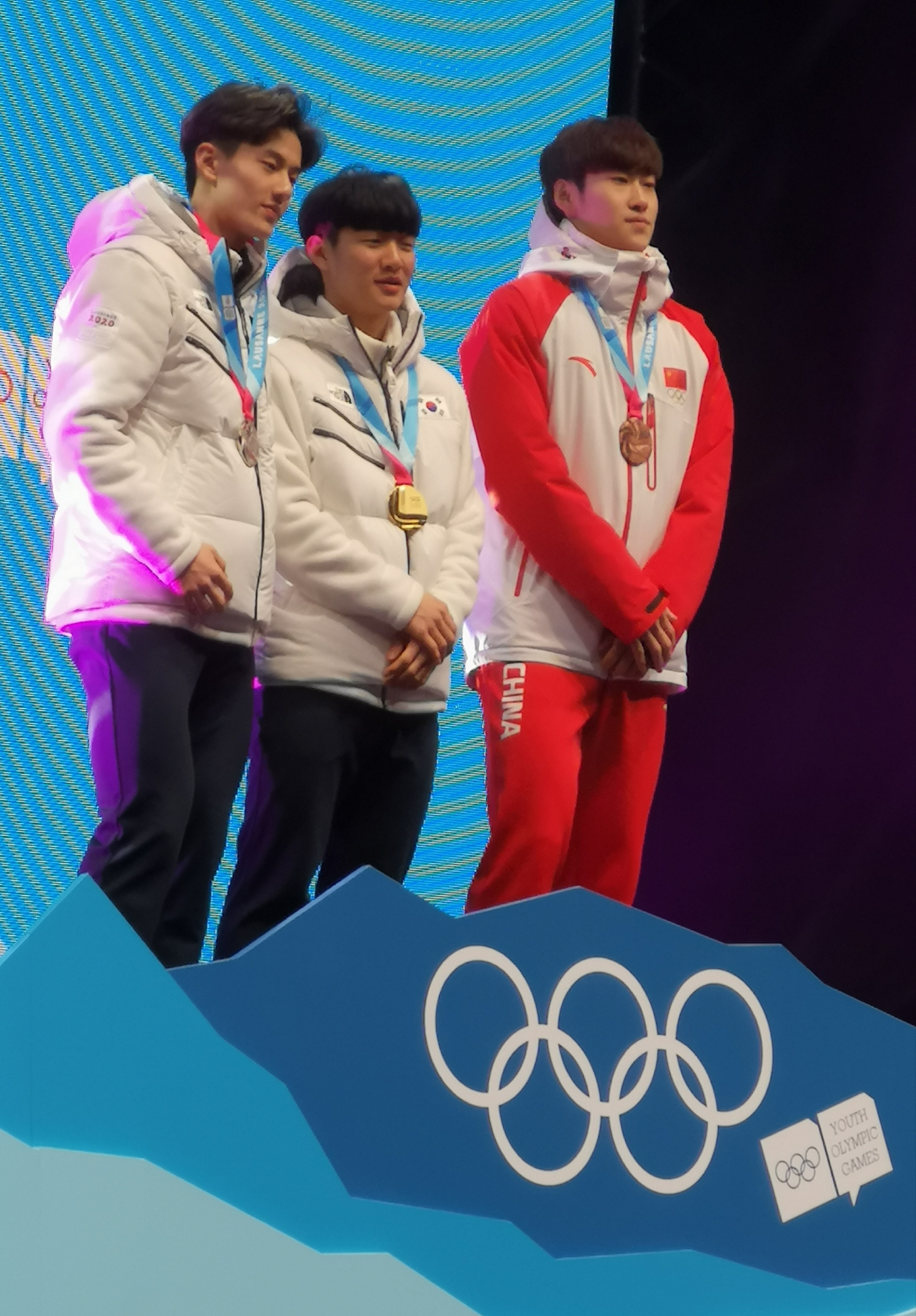
500 m event podium in 2020

Games	Gold	Silver	Bronze
2012 Innsbruck	Yoon Su-min; South Korea	Lim Hyo-jun; South Korea	Xu Hongzhi; China
2016 Lillehammer	Hong Kyung-hwan; South Korea	Kazuki Yoshinaga; Japan	Ma Wei; China
2020 Lausanne	Lee Jeong-min; South Korea	Jang Sung-woo; South Korea	Zhang Tianyi; China
2024 Gangwon	Sean Shuai; United States	Zhang Xinzhe; China	Dominik Gergely Major; Hungary

==== 1000 m ====
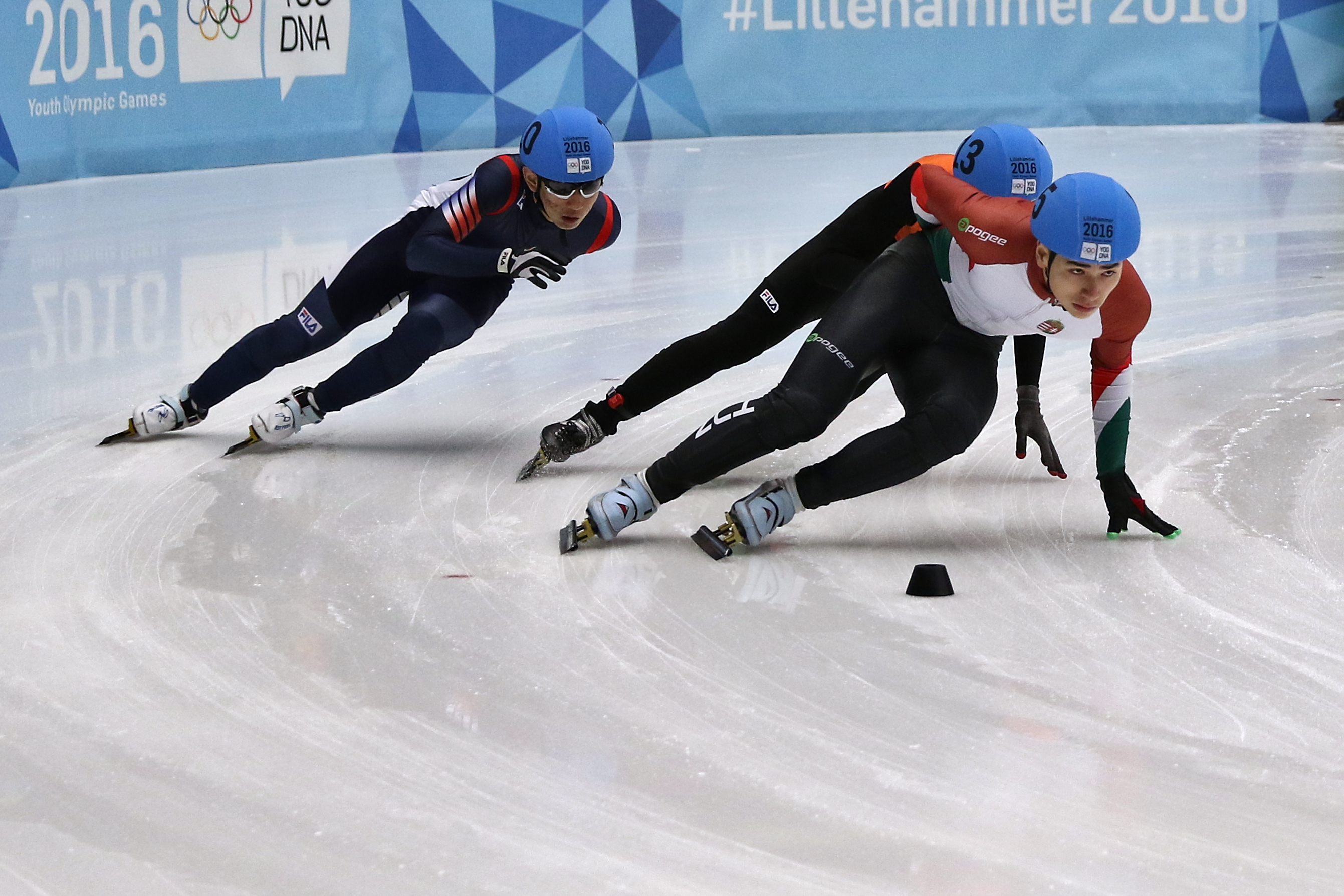
Shaoang Liu, Kyunghwan Hong and Tjerk De Boer competing in 2016

Games	Gold	Silver	Bronze
2012 Innsbruck	Lim Hyo-jun; South Korea	Yoon Su-min; South Korea	Xu Hongzhi; China
2016 Lillehammer	Hwang Dae-heon; South Korea	Ma Wei; China	Shaoang Liu; Hungary
2020 Lausanne	Jang Sung-woo; South Korea	Lee Jeong-min; South Korea	Li Kongchao; China
2024 Gangwon	Zhang Xinzhe; China	Muhammed Bozdağ; Turkey	Raito Kida; Japan

==== 1500 m ====
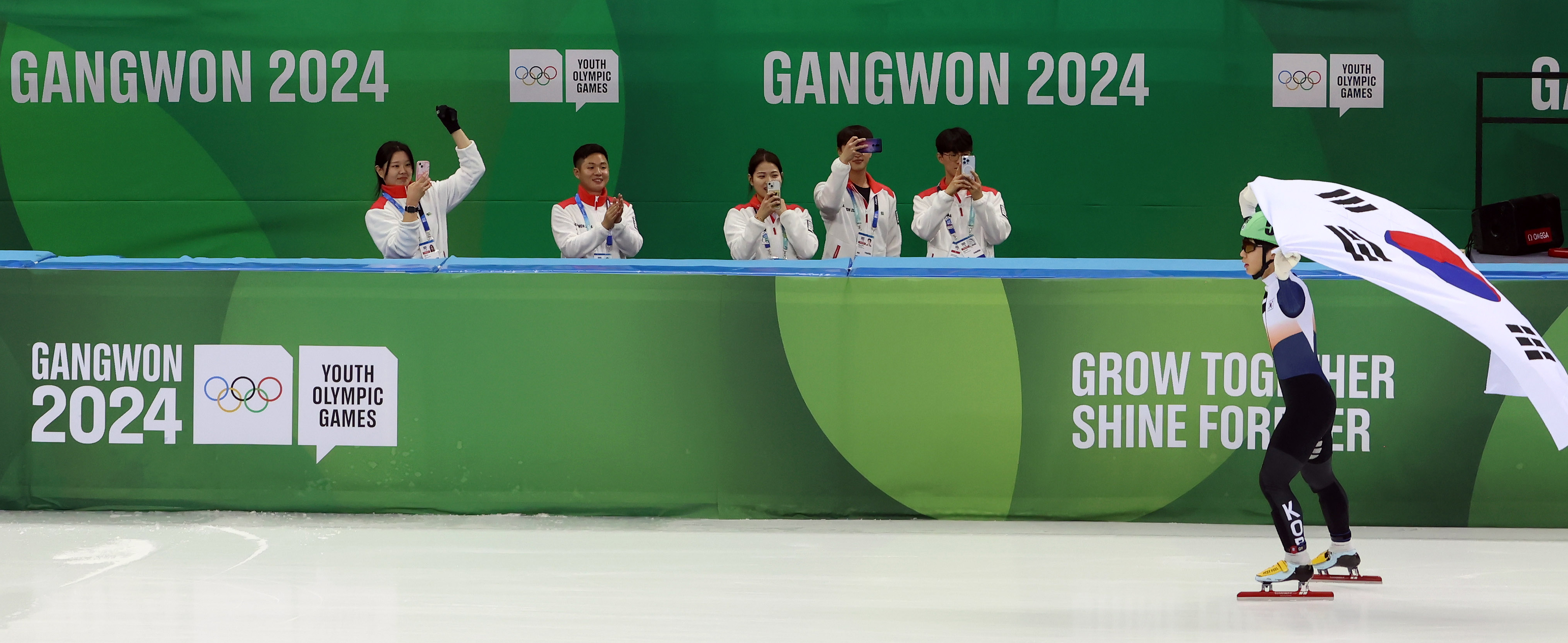
Joo Jae-hee winning in 2024

Games	Gold	Silver	Bronze
2024 Gangwon	Joo Jae-hee; South Korea	Zhang Xinzhe; China	Kim You-sung; South Korea

=== Girls' ===
==== 500 m ====
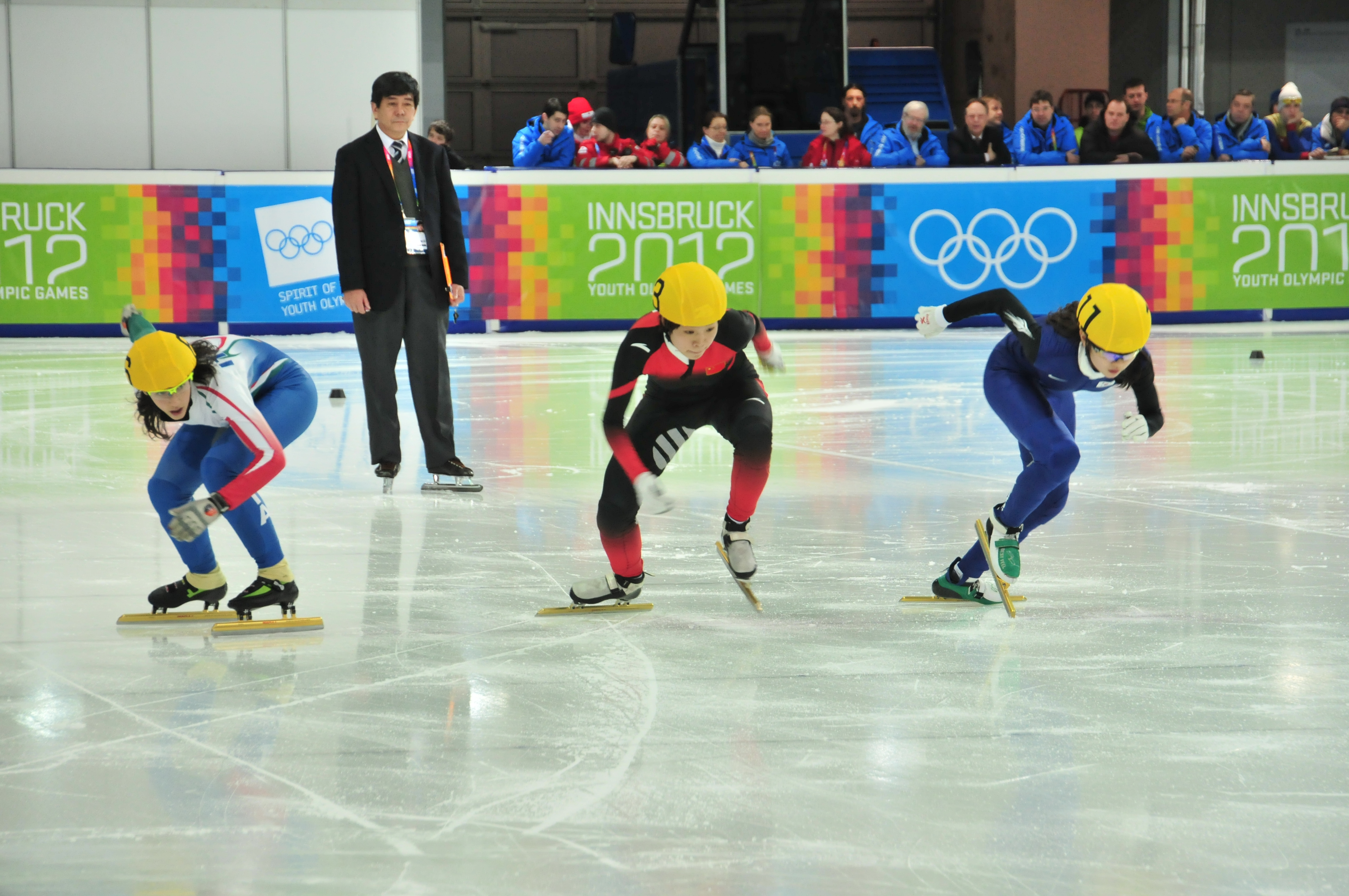
Nicole Martinelli, Xu Aili und Shim Suk-hee competing in 2012

Games	Gold	Silver	Bronze
2012 Innsbruck	Shim Suk-hee; South Korea	Xu Aili; China	Nicole Martinelli; Italy
2016 Lillehammer	Zang Yize; China	Petra Jászapáti; Hungary	Katrin Manoilova; Bulgaria
2020 Lausanne	Seo Whi-min; South Korea	Michelle Velzeboer; Netherlands	Florence Brunelle; Canada
2024 Gangwon	Anna Falkowska; Poland	Kang Min-ji; South Korea	Chung Jae-hee; South Korea

==== 1000 m ====
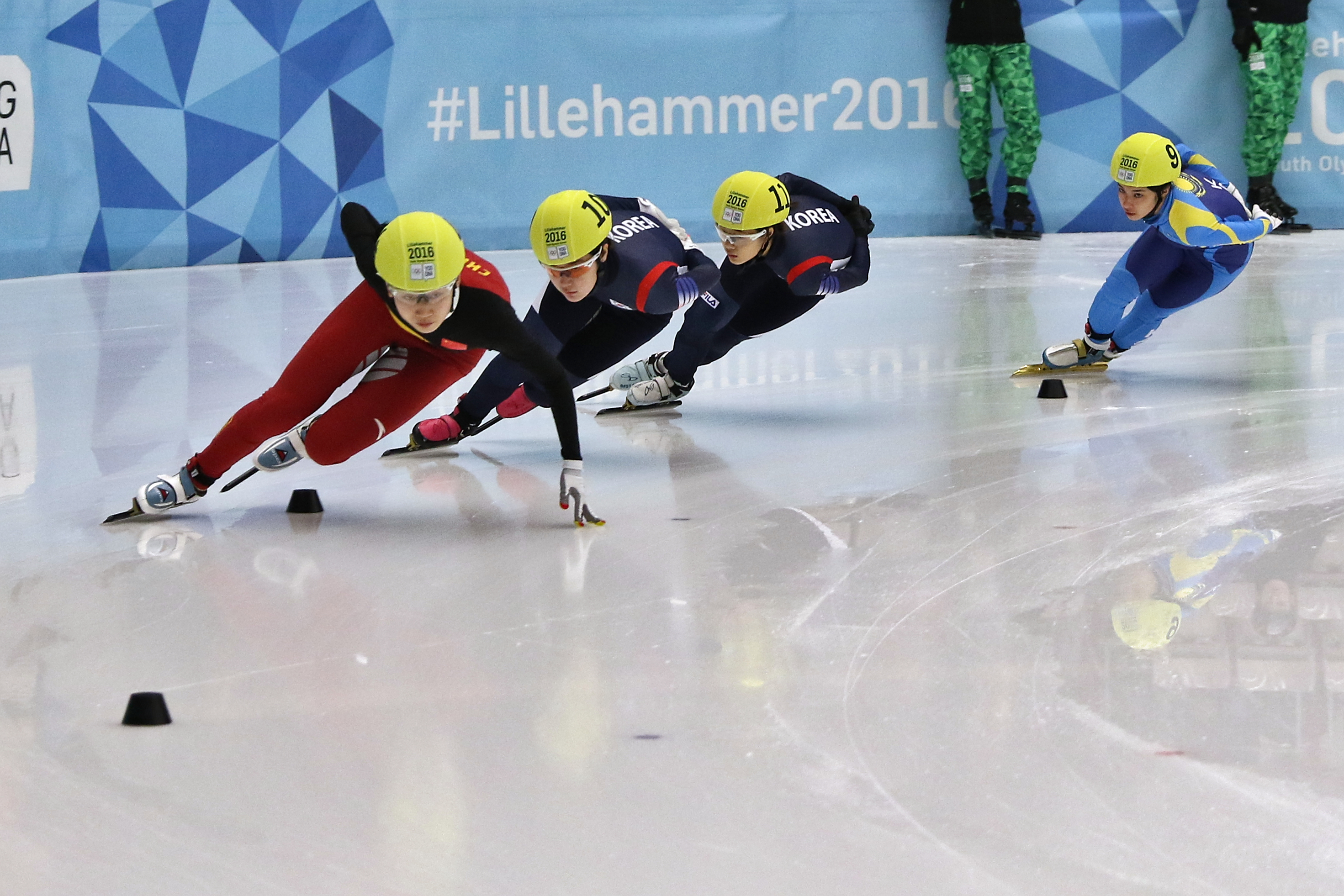
1000 m semifinal in 2016

Games	Gold	Silver	Bronze
2012 Innsbruck	Shim Suk-hee; South Korea	Xu Aili; China	Sumire Kikuchi; Japan
2016 Lillehammer	Kim Ji-yoo; South Korea	Lee Su-youn; South Korea	Anna Seidel; Germany
2020 Lausanne	Seo Whi-min; South Korea	Kim Chan-seo; South Korea	Florence Brunelle; Canada
2024 Gangwon	Li Jinzi; China	Yang Jingru; China	Polina Omelchuk; Kazakhstan

==== 1500 m ====
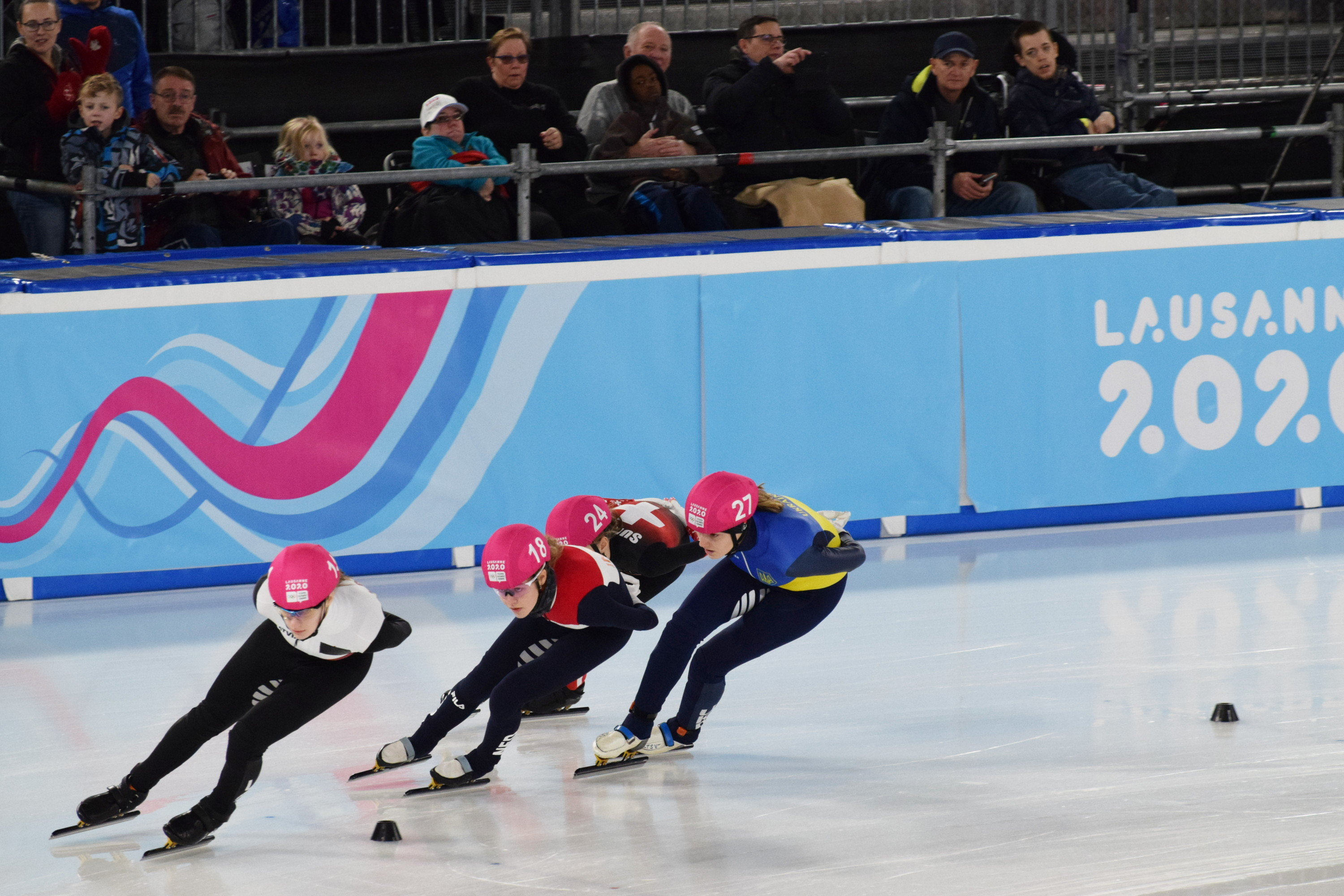
Anna Jansone, Michelle Velzeboer, Alexia Turunen, and Tetiana Zarvanska competing in 1000 m in 2016

Games	Gold	Silver	Bronze
2024 Gangwon	Yang Jingru; China	Li Jinzi; China	Nonomi Inoue; Japan

=== Mixed team ===
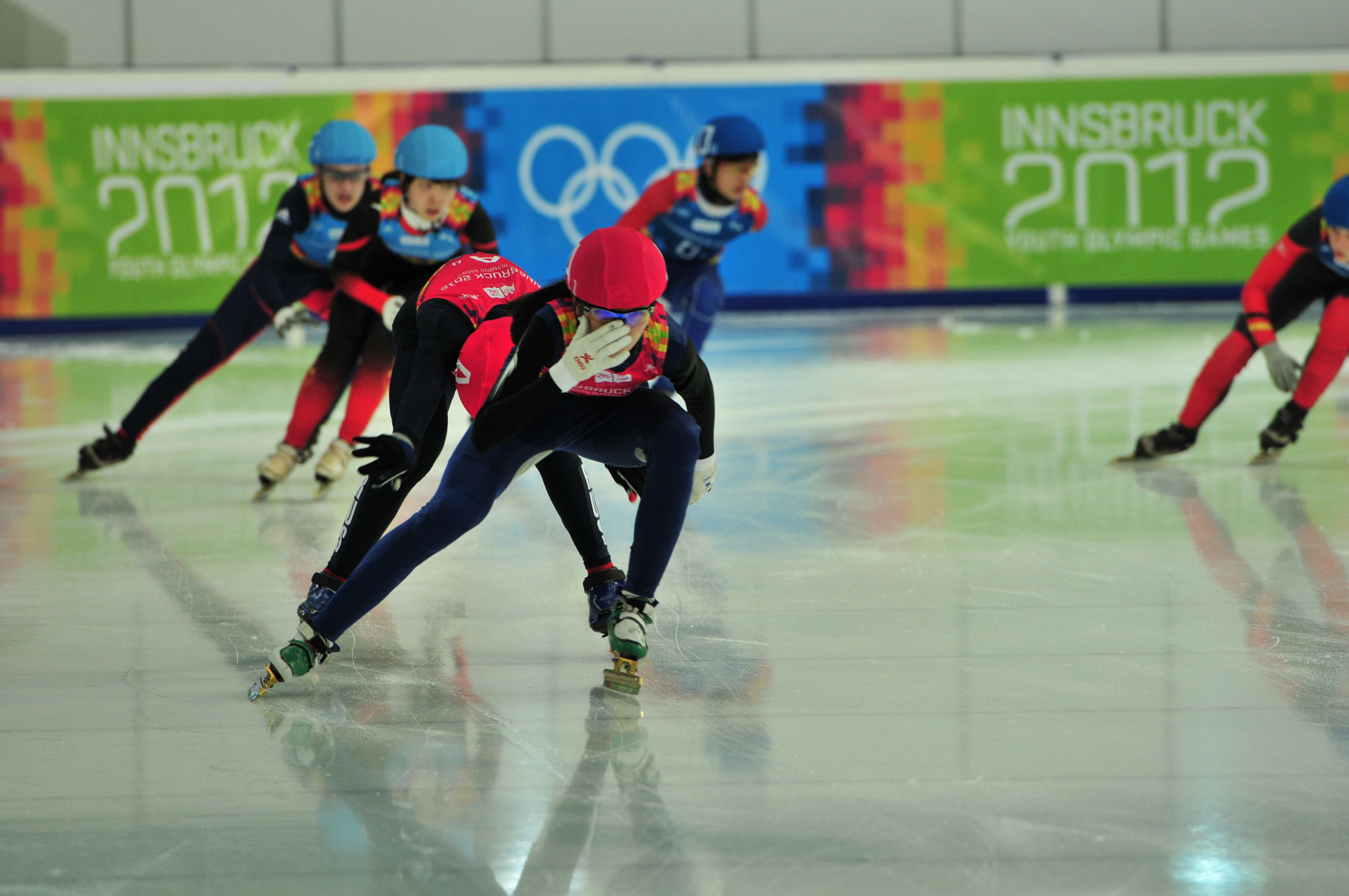
Mixed relay competition in 2012

Games	Gold	Silver	Bronze
2012 Innsbruck	Park Jung-hyun (KOR); Lu Xiucheng (CHN); Xu Aili (CHN); Jack Burrows (GBR)	Qu Chunyu (CHN); Xu Hongzhi (CHN); Mariya Dolgopolova (UKR); Aydin Djemal (GBR)	Shim Suk-hee (KOR); Yoann Martinez (FRA); Melanie Brantner (AUT); Denis Ayrapetyan (RUS)
2016 Lillehammer	Ane Farstad (NOR); Kim Ji-yoo (KOR); Stijn Desmet (BEL); Quentin Fercoq (FRA)	Petra Jászapáti (HUN); Julia Moore (AUS); Tjerk de Boer (NED); Kiichi Shigehiro (JPN)	Katrin Manoilova (BUL); Anita Nagay (KAZ); Kārlis Krūzbergs (LAT); Kazuki Yoshinaga (JPN)
2020 Lausanne	Kim Chan-seo (KOR); Diede van Oorschot (NED); Shogo Miyata (JPN); Jonathan So (USA)	Iuliia Beresneva (RUS); Chang Hui (TPE); Jang Sung-woo (KOR); Gabriel Volet (FRA)	Olivia Weedon (GBR); Seo Whi-min (KOR); Thomas Nadalini (ITA); Ethan De Rose (NZL)
2024 Gangwon	China; Li Jinzi; Yang Jingru; Zhang Bohao; Zhang Xinzhe	United States; Kyung Jang; Eliza Rhodehamel; Julius Kazanecki; Sean Shuai	Japan; Nonomi Inoue; Aoi Yoshizawa; Yuta Fuchigami; Raito Kida

== Medal table ==
As of the 2024 Winter Youth Olympics.

Rank	Nation	Gold	Silver	Bronze	Total
1	South Korea	12	7	2	21
2	China	5	7	5	17
–	Mixed-NOCs	3	3	3	9
3	United States	1	1	0	2
4	Poland	1	0	0	1
5	Japan	0	1	4	5
6	Hungary	0	1	2	3
7	Netherlands	0	1	0	1
7	Turkey	0	1	0	1
9	Canada	0	0	2	2
10	Bulgaria	0	0	1	1
10	Germany	0	0	1	1
10	Italy	0	0	1	1
10	Kazakhstan	0	0	1	1
Totals (13 entries)		22	22	22	66

== Participating nations ==
• = Did not compete in the sport, × = the country did not participate in the Games

Event	12	16	20	24	Years
Australia	1	1	1	1	4
Austria	2	•	1	•	2
Belgium	•	1	1	1	3
Brazil	•	•	•	1	1
Bulgaria	•	1	1	3	3
Canada	•	2	2	4	3
China	4	3	3	4	4
Croatia	•	•	2	•	1
Czech Republic	1	•	1	1	3
France	1	1	2	3	4
Germany	•	2	2	2	3
Great Britain	2	•	2	2	3
Hong Kong	×	×	•	1	1
Hungary	2	3	2	4	4
Italy	3	1	2	4	4
Japan	2	3	3	4	4
Kazakhstan	1	2	2	4	4
Latvia	•	1	2	2	3
Lithuania	•	•	•	1	1
Luxembourg	•	•	1	×	1
Malaysia	×	•	2	×	1
Netherlands	2	2	3	4	4
New Zealand	•	•	1	•	1
Norway	•	2	•	•	1
Philippines	•	×	1	1	2
Poland	•	•	3	3	2
Russia	2	3	3	×	3
Serbia	•	•	1	1	2
Singapore	×	×	2	2	2
Slovakia	•	•	1	2	2
Slovenia	•	•	•	1	1
South Korea	4	4	4	4	4
Switzerland	•	•	2	•	1
Chinese Taipei	2	•	2	•	2
Thailand	×	×	•	2	1
Turkey	•	•	•	2	1
Ukraine	1	•	2	3	3
United States	2	2	3	4	4
Total athletes	32	32	61	71	
Total countries	16	16	32	29	

== See also ==
- Short track speed skating at the Winter Olympics
