= Short-track speed skating at the 2012 Winter Youth Olympics =

Short track speed skating at the I Winter Youth Olympic Games
- Venue: Eisschnelllaufbahn Innsbruck; Innsbruck
- Dates: 20–22 January
- Competitors: 32 from 16 nations

Short track speed skating at the 2012 Winter Youth Olympics was held at the Tyrolean Ice Arena in Innsbruck, Austria from 20 to 22 January. The difference in the Youth Olympic program for short track speed skating compared to the Winter Olympics, was that there was no 1500 metre event and no relay for each gender, instead a mixed NOC relay took place.

== Medal summary ==
=== Medal table ===
Rank	Nation	Gold	Silver	Bronze	Total
1	South Korea	4	2	0	6
–	Mixed-NOCs	1	1	1	3
2	China	0	2	2	4
3	Italy	0	0	1	1
3	Japan	0	0	1	1
Totals (4 entries)		5	5	5	15

=== Boys' events ===
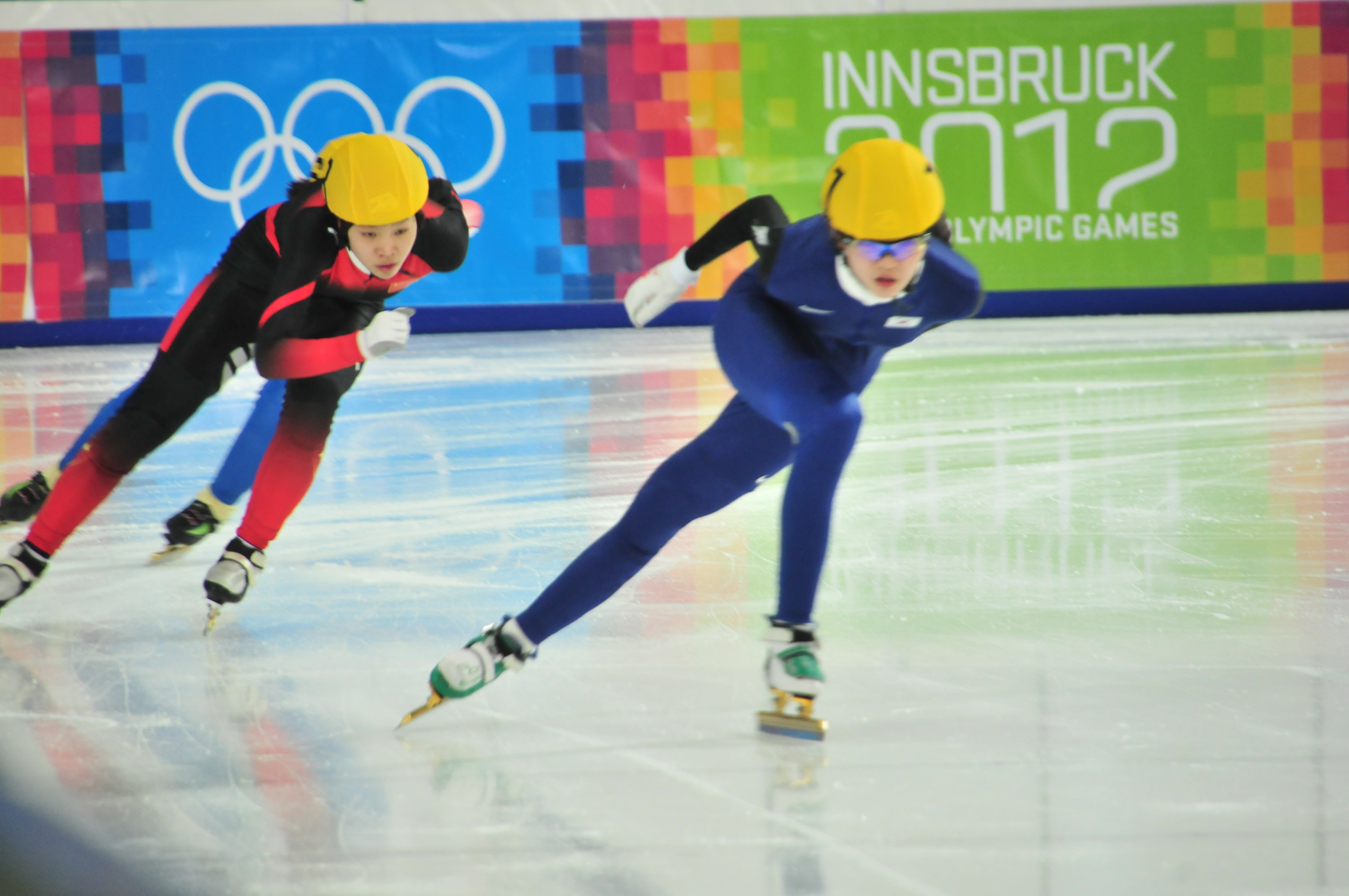
Xu Aili and Shim Suk-hee from left to right

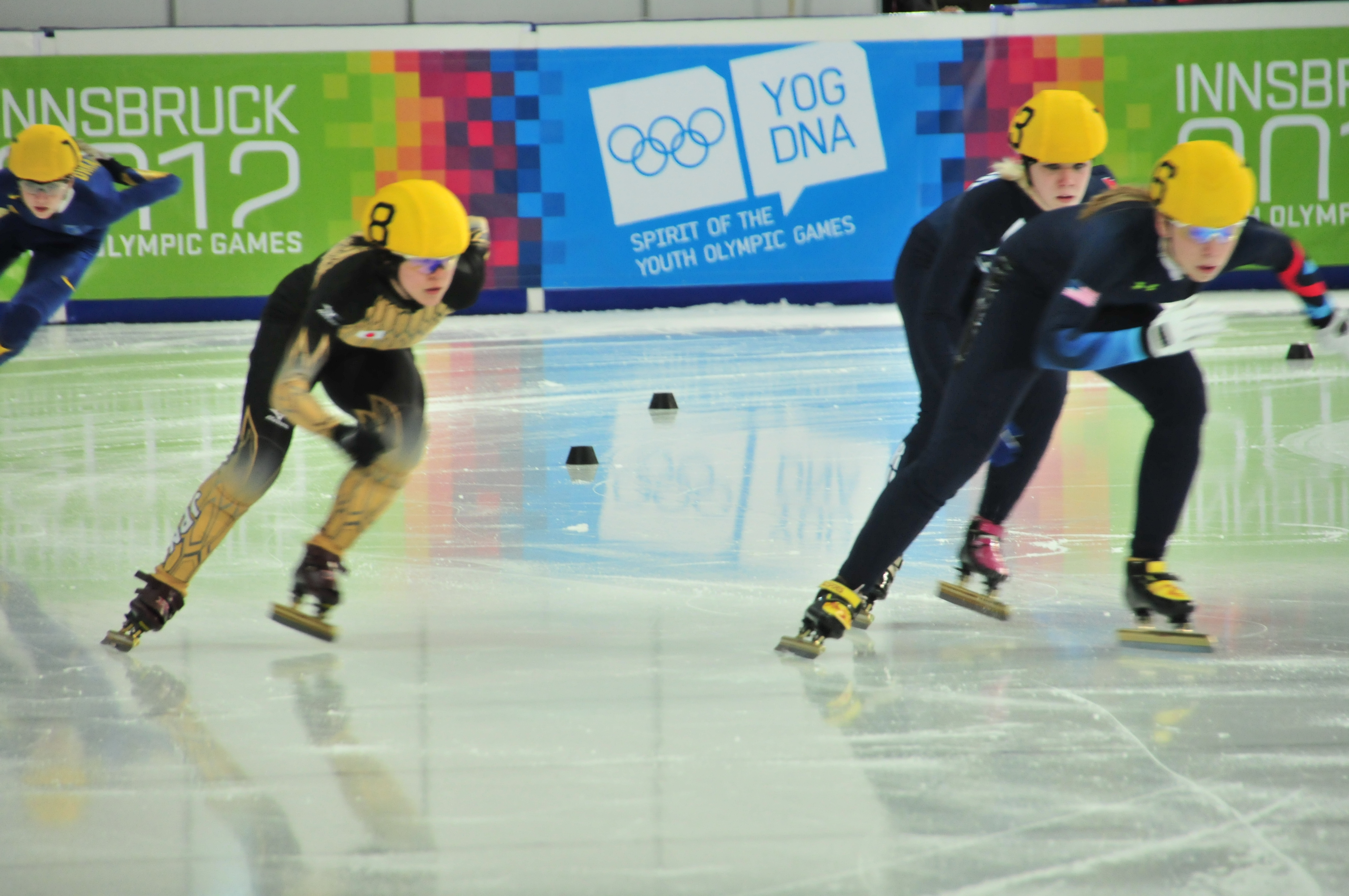
Sarah Warren, Anna Gamorina and Sumire Kikuchi from left to right

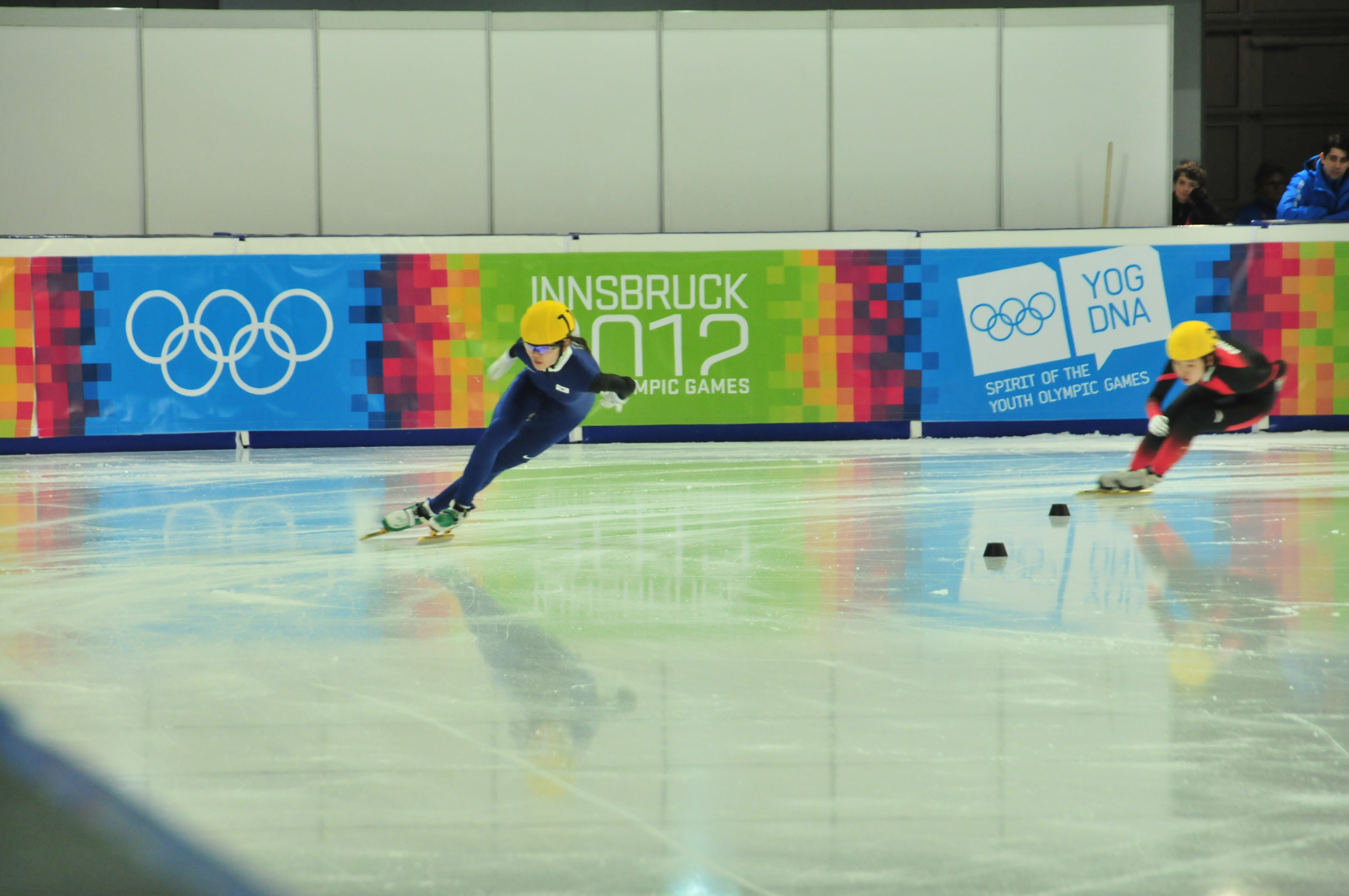
Shim Suk-hee and Xu Aili

Event	Gold		Silver		Bronze	
500 metres	Yoon Su-min; South Korea	42.417	Lim Hyo-jun; South Korea	42.482	Xu Hongzhi; China	42.637
1000 metres	Lim Hyo-jun; South Korea	1:29.284	Yoon Su-min; South Korea	1:29.428	Xu Hongzhi; China	1:29.576

=== Girls' events ===
Event	Gold		Silver		Bronze	
500 metres	Shim Suk-hee; South Korea	44.122	Xu Aili; China	44.593	Nicole Martinelli; Italy	46.390
1000 metres	Shim Suk-hee; South Korea	1:31.661	Xu Aili; China	1:33.351	Sumire Kikuchi; Japan	1:34.254

=== Mixed ===
Event	Gold		Silver		Bronze	
Mixed team relay	Park Jung-hyun (KOR); Lu Xiucheng (CHN); Xu Aili (CHN); Jack Burrows (GBR)	4:21.713	Qu Chunyu (CHN); Xu Hongzhi (CHN); Mariya Dolgopolova (UKR); Aydin Djemal (GBR)	4:24.665	Shim Suk-hee (KOR); Yoann Martinez (FRA); Melanie Brantner (AUT); Denis Ayrapetyan (RUS)	4:26.352

== Qualification system ==
Each nation can send a maximum of four athletes (two boys and two girls). The top three athletes in the overall standings for both genders (three different NOCs) at the 2011 World Junior Short Track Speed Skating Championships are permitted to send two athletes per gender. The host nation is guaranteed one spot in each event. Finally the remaining spots will be distributed in the order of finish at the World Junior Short Track Speed Skating Championships up until the maximum quota is reached, with a limit of one athlete per NOC.

== Qualification summary ==
NOC	Boys	Girls	Total
Australia		1	1
Austria	1	1	2
China	2	2	4
Czech Republic	1		1
France	1		1
Great Britain	2		2
Hungary	1	1	2
Italy	1	2	3
Japan	1	1	2
Kazakhstan		1	1
South Korea	2	2	4
Netherlands	1	1	2
Russia	1	1	2
Chinese Taipei	1	1	2
Ukraine		1	1
United States	1	1	2
Total athletes	16	16	32
Total NOCs	13	13	16
