= Short-track speed skating at the 2012 Winter Youth Olympics – Boys' 1000 metres =

Boys' 1000 metres at the I Winter Youth Olympic Games
- Venue: Eisschnelllaufbahn Innsbruck
- Dates: 18 January
- Competitors: 16 from 13 nations
- Winning time: 1:29.284

Medalists
1st place, gold medalist(s)		Lim Hyo-jun	South Korea
2nd place, silver medalist(s)		Yoon Su-min	South Korea
3rd place, bronze medalist(s)		Xu Hongzhi	China

The boys' 1000 metres in short track speed skating at the 2012 Winter Youth Olympics was held on 18 January at the Eisschnelllaufbahn Innsbruck.

== Results ==
QAB – qualified for the semifinals A/B
QCD – qualified for the semifinals C/D
DNF – did not finish

=== Quarterfinals ===
Rank	Heat	Name	Country	Time	Notes
1	1	Kei Saito	Japan	1:30.502	QAB
2	1	Thomas Hong	United States	1:30.615	QAB
3	1	Lu Xiucheng	China	1:30.764	QCD
4	1	Tamás Farkas	Hungary	1:33.101	QCD
1	2	Xu Hongzhi	China	1:34.610	QAB
2	2	Jack Burrows	Great Britain	1:34.981	QAB
3	2	Denis Ayrapetyan	Russia	1:47.810	QCD
4	2	Chang Yin-cheng	Chinese Taipei	1:53.640	QCD
1	3	Lim Hyo-jun	South Korea	1:32.445	QAB
2	3	Yoann Martinez	France	1:33.762	QAB
3	3	Michal Prokop	Czech Republic	1:36.489	QCD
	3	Josse Antonissen	Netherlands	DNF	
1	4	Yoon Su-min	South Korea	1:31.887	QAB
2	4	Milan Grugni	Italy	1:33.540	QAB
3	4	Aydin Djemal	Great Britain	1:33.582	QCD
4	4	Dominic Andermann	Austria	1:39.869	QCD

=== Semifinals ===
==== Semifinals C/D ====
QC – qualified for Final C
QD – qualified for Final D

Rank	Heat	Name	Country	Time	Notes
1	1	Aydin Djemal	Great Britain	1:37.035	QC
2	1	Chang Yin-cheng	Chinese Taipei	1:37.806	QC
3	1	Michal Prokop	Czech Republic	1:38.044	QD
4	1	Dominic Andermann	Austria	1:38.822	QD
1	2	Lu Xiucheng	China	1:32.822	QC
2	2	Denis Ayrapetyan	Russia	1:33.689	QC
3	2	Tamás Farkas	Hungary	1:55.852	QD

==== Semifinals A/B ====
QA – qualified for Final A
QB – qualified for Final B
DNF – did not finish

Rank	Heat	Name	Country	Time	Notes
1	1	Lim Hyo-jun	South Korea	1:29.442	QA
2	1	Kei Saito	Japan	1:29.689	QA
3	1	Jack Burrows	Great Britain	1:33.700	QB
	1	Thomas Hong	United States	DNF	
1	2	Yoon Su-min	South Korea	1:31.239	QA
2	2	Xu Hongzhi	China	1:31.377	QA
3	2	Yoann Martinez	France	1:32.564	QB
4	2	Milan Grugni	Italy	1:33.183	QB

=== Finals ===
PEN – penalty

==== Final D ====
Rank	Name	Country	Time	Notes
12	Tamás Farkas	Hungary	1:34.395	
13	Michal Prokop	Czech Republic	1:36.324	
14	Dominic Andermann	Austria	1:39.097	

==== Final C ====
Rank	Name	Country	Time	Notes
9	Lu Xiucheng	China	1:32.369	
10	Aydin Djemal	Great Britain	1:33.689	
11	Chang Yin-cheng	Chinese Taipei	1:59.205	
15	Denis Ayrapetyan	Russia		PEN

==== Final B ====
Rank	Name	Country	Time	Notes
5	Milan Grugni	Italy	1:40.766	
6	Yoann Martinez	France	1:40.840	
7	Jack Burrows	Great Britain	1:41.172	

==== Final A ====
Rank	Name	Country	Time	Notes
1st place, gold medalist(s)	Lim Hyo-jun	South Korea	1:29.284	
2nd place, silver medalist(s)	Yoon Su-min	South Korea	1:29.428	
3rd place, bronze medalist(s)	Xu Hongzhi	China	1:29.576	
4	Kei Saito	Japan	1:30.142	
