= Short-track speed skating at the 2012 Winter Youth Olympics – Mixed team relay =

Mixed team relay at the I Winter Youth Olympic Games
- Venue: Eisschnelllaufbahn Innsbruck
- Dates: 21 January
- Competitors: 32
- Teams: 8
- Winning time: 4:21.713

Medalists
| 1st place, gold medalist(s) | | Park Jung-hyun; Lu Xiucheng; Xu Aili; Jack Burrows | Mixed-NOCs |
| 2nd place, silver medalist(s) | | Qu Chunyu; Xu Hongzhi; Mariya Dolgopolova; Aydin Djemal | Mixed-NOCs |
| 3rd place, bronze medalist(s) | | Shim Suk-hee; Yoann Martinez; Melanie Brantner; Denis Ayrapetyan | Mixed-NOCs |

The mixed team relay in short track speed skating at the 2012 Winter Youth Olympics was held on 21 January at the Eisschnelllaufbahn Innsbruck.

== Results ==
QA – qualified for Final A
QB – qualified for Final B
PEN – penalty

=== Semifinals ===
| Rank | Semifinal | Team | Athletes | Time | Notes |
|---|---|---|---|---|---|
| 1 | 1 | Team F | Qu Chunyu (CHN); Xu Hongzhi (CHN); Mariya Dolgopolova (UKR); Aydin Djemal (GBR) | 4:21.227 | QA |
| 2 | 1 | Team A | Shim Suk-hee (KOR); Yoann Martinez (FRA); Melanie Brantner (AUT); Denis Ayrapetyan (RUS) | 4:21.668 | QA |
| 3 | 1 | Team G | Darya Goncharova (KAZ); Yoon Su-min (KOR); Arianna Sighel (ITA); Dominic Andermann (AUT) | 4:22.356 | QB |
| 4 | 1 | Team D | Elisabeth Witt (GER); Thomas Hong (USA); Sumire Kikuchi (JPN); Chang Yin-cheng (TPE) | 4:23.141 | QB |
| 1 | 2 | Team B | Park Jung-hyun (KOR); Lu Xiucheng (CHN); Xu Aili (CHN); Jack Burrows (GBR) | 4:21.656 | QA |
| 2 | 2 | Team H | Anna Gamorina (RUS); Lim Hyo-jun (KOR); Aafke Soet (NED); Michal Prokop (CZE) | 4:26.027 | QA |
| 3 | 2 | Team C | Nicole Martinelli (ITA); Milan Grugni (ITA); Tímea Tóth (HUN); Tamás Farkas (HUN) | 4:28.026 | QB |
| 4 | 2 | Team E | Sarah Warren (USA); Kei Saito (JPN); Lin Yu-tzu (TPE); Josse Antonissen (NED) | 4:36.208 | QB |

=== Final B ===
| Rank | Team | Athletes | Time | Notes |
|---|---|---|---|---|
| 4 | Team D | Elisabeth Witt (GER); Thomas Hong (USA); Sumire Kikuchi (JPN); Chang Yin-cheng (TPE) | 4:24.360 | |
| 5 | Team C | Nicole Martinelli (ITA); Milan Grugni (ITA); Tímea Tóth (HUN); Tamás Farkas (HUN) | 4:29.686 | |
| 6 | Team E | Sarah Warren (USA); Kei Saito (JPN); Lin Yu-tzu (TPE); Josse Antonissen (NED) | 4:30.383 | |
| | Team G | Darya Goncharova (KAZ); Yoon Su-min (KOR); Arianna Sighel (ITA); Dominic Andermann (AUT) | PEN | |

=== Final A ===
| Rank | Team | Athletes | Time | Notes |
|---|---|---|---|---|
| 1st place, gold medalist(s) | Team B | Park Jung-hyun (KOR); Lu Xiucheng (CHN); Xu Aili (CHN); Jack Burrows (GBR) | 4:21.713 | |
| 2nd place, silver medalist(s) | Team F | Qu Chunyu (CHN); Xu Hongzhi (CHN); Mariya Dolgopolova (UKR); Aydin Djemal (GBR) | 4:24.665 | |
| 3rd place, bronze medalist(s) | Team A | Shim Suk-hee (KOR); Yoann Martinez (FRA); Melanie Brantner (AUT); Denis Ayrapetyan (RUS) | 4:26.352 | |
| | Team H | Anna Gamorina (RUS); Lim Hyo-jun (KOR); Aafke Soet (NED); Michal Prokop (CZE) | PEN | |
