= Short-track speed skating at the 2012 Winter Youth Olympics – Boys' 500 metres =

Boys' 500 metres at the I Winter Youth Olympic Games
- Venue: Eisschnelllaufbahn Innsbruck
- Dates: 19 January
- Competitors: 16 from 13 nations
- Winning time: 42.417

Medalists
1st place, gold medalist(s)		Yoon Su-min	South Korea
2nd place, silver medalist(s)		Lim Hyo-jun	South Korea
3rd place, bronze medalist(s)		Xu Hongzhi	China

The boys' 500 metres in short track speed skating at the 2012 Winter Youth Olympics was held on 19 January at the Eisschnelllaufbahn Innsbruck.

== Results ==
QAB – qualified for the semifinals A/B
QCD – qualified for the semifinals C/D
PEN – penalty
ADA – advanced

=== Quarterfinals ===
Rank	Heat	Name	Country	Time	Notes
1	1	Xu Hongzhi	China	43.022	QAB
2	1	Kei Saito	Japan	43.173	QAB
3	1	Jack Burrows	Great Britain	45.491	QCD
4	1	Michal Prokop	Czech Republic	1:03.050	QCD
1	2	Lim Hyo-jun	South Korea	44.291	QAB
2	2	Josse Antonissen	Netherlands	48.738	QAB
3	2	Milan Grugni	Italy	1:05.394	ADA
	2	Yoann Martinez	France		PEN
1	3	Thomas Hong	United States	44.485	QAB
2	3	Lu Xiucheng	China	44.504	QAB
3	3	Aydin Djemal	Great Britain	45.556	QCD
4	3	Chang Yin-cheng	Chinese Taipei	48.113	QCD
1	4	Yoon Su-min	South Korea	43.310	QAB
2	4	Denis Ayrapetyan	Russia	45.836	QAB
3	4	Tamás Farkas	Hungary	46.037	QCD
4	4	Dominic Andermann	Austria	48.312	QCD

=== Semifinals ===
==== Semifinals C/D ====
QC – qualified for Final C
QD – qualified for Final D
PEN – penalty

Rank	Heat	Name	Country	Time	Notes
1	1	Chang Yin-cheng	Chinese Taipei	46.824	QC
2	1	Dominic Andermann	Austria	47.751	QC
	1	Jack Burrows	Great Britain		PEN
1	2	Aydin Djemal	Great Britain	45.721	QC
2	2	Tamás Farkas	Hungary	45.777	QC
3	2	Michal Prokop	Czech Republic	48.148	QD

==== Semifinals A/B ====
QA – qualified for Final A
QB – qualified for Final B

Rank	Heat	Name	Country	Time	Notes
1	1	Xu Hongzhi	China	42.832	QA
2	1	Lim Hyo-jun	South Korea	42.911	QA
3	1	Kei Saito	Japan	43.000	QB
4	1	Milan Grugni	Italy	46.685	QB
5	1	Josse Antonissen	Netherlands	1:00.507	QB
1	2	Yoon Su-min	South Korea	42.468	QA
2	2	Thomas Hong	United States	43.187	QA
3	2	Denis Ayrapetyan	Russia	45.026	QB
4	2	Lu Xiucheng	China	1:20.806	QB

=== Finals ===
==== Final D ====
Rank	Name	Country	Time	Notes
14	Michal Prokop	Czech Republic		

==== Final C ====
Rank	Name	Country	Time	Notes
10	Tamás Farkas	Hungary	46.035	
11	Chang Yin-cheng	Chinese Taipei	46.412	
12	Dominic Andermann	Austria	50.729	
13	Aydin Djemal	Great Britain	1:02.356	

==== Final B ====
Rank	Name	Country	Time	Notes
5	Kei Saito	Japan	45.600	
6	Denis Ayrapetyan	Russia	45.902	
7	Josse Antonissen	Netherlands	47.314	
8	Milan Grugni	Italy	49.630	
9	Lu Xiucheng	China		PEN

==== Final A ====
Rank	Name	Country	Time	Notes
1st place, gold medalist(s)	Yoon Su-min	South Korea	42.417	
2nd place, silver medalist(s)	Lim Hyo-jun	South Korea	42.482	
3rd place, bronze medalist(s)	Xu Hongzhi	China	42.637	
4	Thomas Hong	United States	42.782	
