= Chinese Taipei at the 2012 Winter Youth Olympics =

- IOC code: TPE
- NOC: Chinese Taipei Olympic Committee

in Innsbruck
- Competitors: 4 in 3 sports
- Flag bearer: Lien Te-An
- Medals: Gold 0 Silver 0 Bronze 0 Total 0

Winter Youth Olympics appearances (overview)
- 2012; 2016; 2020; 2024

Chinese Taipei competed at the 2012 Winter Youth Olympics in Innsbruck, Austria. The Chinese Taipei team was made up of four athletes in three sports.

== Alpine skiing ==
Chinese Taipei has qualified one boy in alpine skiing.

Boy

Athlete	Event	Final			
Athlete	Event	Run 1	Run 2	Total	Rank
Wu Meng-Che	Slalom	1:14.46	1:11.01	2:25.47	35
Wu Meng-Che	Giant slalom	1:36.28	1:30.81	3:07.09	38

== Luge ==
Chinese Taipei has qualified one boy in luge.

Boy

Athlete	Event	Final			
Athlete	Event	Run 1	Run 2	Total	Rank
Lien Te-An	Boys' Singles	41.044	40.856	1:21.900	20

== Short track speed skating ==
Chinese Taipei has qualified one male and female short track speed skater.

Boy

Athlete	Event	Quarterfinals		Semifinals		Finals	
Athlete	Event	Time	Rank	Time	Rank	Time	Rank
Chang Yin-Cheng	Boys' 500 metres	48.113	4 qCD	46.824	1 qC	46.412	2
Chang Yin-Cheng	Boys' 1000 metres	1:53.640	4 qCD	1:37.806	2 qC	1:59.205	3

Girl

Athlete	Event	Quarterfinals		Semifinals		Finals	
Athlete	Event	Time	Rank	Time	Rank	Time	Rank
Lin Yu-Tzu	Girls' 500 metres	49.423	4 qCD	48.598	2 qC	49.492	4
Lin Yu-Tzu	Girls' 1000 metres	1:39.749	3 qCD	1:39.539	1 qC	1:39.185	2

Mixed

Athlete	Event	Semifinals		Finals	
Athlete	Event	Time	Rank	Time	Rank
Team D Elisabeth Witt (GER); Thomas Insuk Hong (USA); Sumire Kikuchi (JPN); Chang Yin-Cheng (TPE)	Mixed Team Relay	4:23.141	4 qB	4:24.360	1
Team E Sarah Warren (USA); Kei Saito (JPN); Lin Yu-Tzu (TPE); Josse Antonissen (NED)	Mixed Team Relay	4:36.208	4 qB	4:30.383	3

== See also ==
- Chinese Taipei at the 2012 Summer Olympics
