= Mixed-NOCs at the 2012 Winter Youth Olympics =

Mixed-NOCs participation at the Youth Olympic Games
Mixed-NOC teams participated under the Olympic flag

At the 2012 Winter Youth Olympics in Austria
Medals	Gold; 3	Silver; 3	Bronze; 3	Total; 9
- The medal count above include those won at events where all participating teams were mixed-NOC teams.

Teams made up of athletes representing different National Olympic Committees (NOCs), called mixed-NOCs teams, participated in the 2012 Winter Youth Olympics. These teams participated in events composed entirely of mixed-NOCs teams. When a mixed-NOCs team won a medal, the Olympic flag was raised rather than a national flag; when a mixed-NOCs team won gold, the Olympic anthem would be played instead of national anthems.

== Background ==
The concept of mixed-NOCs was introduced in the 2010 Summer Youth Olympics, in which athletes from different nations would compete in the same team, often representing their continent. This is in contrast to the Mixed team (IOC code: ZZX) found at early senior Olympic Games.

== Medal summary ==
The following medal summary lists all nations whose athletes won a medal while competing for a mixed-NOCs team. If there is more than one athlete from the same nation on a medal-winning team, only one medal of that colour is credited, so therefore in this medal summary China are credited with only one gold rather than two for their participation in the gold-winning short track speed skating team.

A total of 15 National Olympic Committees, including hosts Austria, had at least one athlete representing a mixed-NOCs team win a medal.

Mixed-NOCs medals — summary by athletes' nations
* Host nation (Austria)

Rank	Nation	Gold	Silver	Bronze	Total
1	South Korea	1	1	2	4
2	China	1	1	0	2
2	Great Britain	1	1	0	2
4	United States	1	0	1	2
5	Belarus	1	0	0	1
5	Germany	1	0	0	1
5	Japan	1	0	0	1
5	Switzerland	1	0	0	1
9	Ukraine	0	2	0	2
10	Russia	0	1	2	3
11	Finland	0	1	0	1
11	Norway	0	1	0	1
13	France	0	0	2	2
14	Austria*	0	0	1	1
14	Kazakhstan	0	0	1	1
Totals (15 entries)		8	8	9	25

== Curling ==
Games	Gold	Silver	Bronze
Mixed doubles	Michael Brunner (SUI); Nicole Muskatewitz (GER)	Martin Sesaker (NOR); Kim Eun-bi (KOR)	Korey Dropkin (USA); Marina Verenich (RUS)

== Figure Skating ==
Discipline	Gold	Silver	Bronze
Mixed NOC team	Shoma Uno (JPN); Jordan Bauth (USA); Eugenia Tkachenka / Yuri Hulitski (BLR)	Yaroslav Paniot (UKR); Eveliina Viljanen (FIN); Maria Simonova / Dmitri Dragun (RUS)	Alexander Lyan (KAZ); Park So-youn (KOR); Estelle Elizabeth / Romain Le Gac (FRA)

== Short Track Speed Skating ==
Event	Gold		Silver		Bronze	
Mixed team relay	Park Jung-hyun (KOR); Lu Xiucheng (CHN); Xu Aili (CHN); Jack Burrows (GBR)	4:21.713	Qu Chunyu (CHN); Xu Hongzhi (CHN); Mariya Dolgopolova (UKR); Aydin Djemal (GBR)	4:24.665	Shim Suk-hee (KOR); Yoann Martinez (FRA); Melanie Brantner (AUT); Denis Ayrapetyan (RUS)	4:26.352

== See also ==
- 2012 Winter Youth Olympics medal table
- Mixed-NOCs at the Youth Olympics
