= Short-track speed skating at the 2012 Winter Youth Olympics – Girls' 1000 metres =

Girls' 1000 metres at the I Winter Youth Olympic Games
- Venue: Eisschnelllaufbahn Innsbruck
- Dates: 18 January
- Competitors: 16 from 13 nations
- Winning time: 1:31.661

Medalists
1st place, gold medalist(s)		Shim Suk-hee	South Korea
2nd place, silver medalist(s)		Xu Aili	China
3rd place, bronze medalist(s)		Sumire Kikuchi	Japan

The girls' 1000 metres in short track speed skating at the 2012 Winter Youth Olympics was held on 18 January at the Eisschnelllaufbahn Innsbruck.

== Results ==
QAB – qualified for the semifinals A/B
QCD – qualified for the semifinals C/D
DNF – did not finish

=== Quarterfinals ===
Rank	Heat	Name	Country	Time	Notes
1	1	Shim Suk-hee	South Korea	1:37.066	QAB
2	1	Darya Goncharova	Kazakhstan	1:37.822	QAB
3	1	Anna Gamorina	Russia	1:50.594	QCD
	1	Mariya Dolgopolova	Ukraine	DNF	
1	2	Park Jung-hyun	South Korea	1:36.331	QAB
2	2	Arianna Sighel	Italy	1:38.102	QAB
3	2	Aafke Soet	Netherlands	1:38.302	QCD
4	2	Melanie Brantner	Austria	1:46.275	QCD
1	3	Qu Chunyu	China	1:39.607	QAB
2	3	Nicole Martinelli	Italy	1:39.809	QAB
3	3	Elisabeth Witt	Germany	1:42.928	QCD
	3	Tímea Tóth	Hungary	DNF	
1	4	Xu Aili	China	1:36.614	QAB
2	4	Sumire Kikuchi	Japan	1:36.670	QAB
3	4	Lin Yu-tzu	Chinese Taipei	1:39.749	QCD
4	4	Sarah Warren	United States	1:40.397	QCD

=== Semifinals ===
==== Semifinals C/D ====
QC – qualified for Final C
QD – qualified for Final D

Rank	Heat	Name	Country	Time	Notes
1	1	Lin Yu-tzu	Chinese Taipei	1:39.539	QC
2	1	Elisabeth Witt	Germany	1:39.667	QC
3	1	Melanie Brantner	Austria	1:47.437	QD
1	2	Anna Gamorina	Russia	1:44.645	QC
2	2	Sarah Warren	United States	1:45.006	QC
3	2	Aafke Soet	Netherlands	1:45.165	QD

==== Semifinals A/B ====
QA – qualified for Final A
QB – qualified for Final B
PEN – penalty

Rank	Heat	Name	Country	Time	Notes
1	1	Shim Suk-hee	South Korea	1:34.809	QA
2	1	Xu Aili	China	1:35.362	QA
3	1	Darya Goncharova	Kazakhstan	1:36.487	QB
4	1	Arianna Sighel	Italy	1:37.609	QB
1	2	Park Jung-hyun	South Korea	1:33.823	QA
2	2	Sumire Kikuchi	Japan	1:35.301	QA
3	2	Nicole Martinelli	Italy	1:36.620	QB
	2	Qu Chunyu	China	PEN	

=== Finals ===
PEN – penalty
YC – yellow card

==== Final D ====
Rank	Name	Country	Time	Notes
12	Aafke Soet	Netherlands	1:40.885	
13	Melanie Brantner	Austria	1:46.885	

==== Final C ====
Rank	Name	Country	Time	Notes
8	Anna Gamorina	Russia	1:38.042	
9	Lin Yu-tzu	Chinese Taipei	1:39.185	
10	Elisabeth Witt	Germany	1:40.980	
11	Sarah Warren	United States	1:50.026	

==== Final B ====
Rank	Name	Country	Time	Notes
4	Nicole Martinelli	Italy	1:47.451	
5	Arianna Sighel	Italy	2:13.756	
6	Darya Goncharova	Kazakhstan	PEN	

==== Final A ====
Rank	Name	Country	Time	Notes
1st place, gold medalist(s)	Shim Suk-hee	South Korea	1:31.661	
2nd place, silver medalist(s)	Xu Aili	China	1:33.351	
3rd place, bronze medalist(s)	Sumire Kikuchi	Japan	1:34.254	
	Park Jung-hyun	South Korea	YC	
