= Freestyle skiing at the 2012 Winter Youth Olympics – Girls' halfpipe =

Girls' halfpipe at the I Winter Youth Olympic Games
- Venue: Kühtai
- Dates: 14–15 January
- Competitors: 9 from 9 nations
- Winning points: 84.75

Medalists
1st place, gold medalist(s)		Elisabeth Gram	Austria
2nd place, silver medalist(s)		Tiril Sjåstad Christiansen	Norway
3rd place, bronze medalist(s)		Marin Tripier Mondancin	France

The girls' halfpipe event in freestyle skiing at the 2012 Winter Youth Olympics in Innsbruck, Austria, was held on 14 and 15 January at Kühtai. 10 athletes from 10 countries took part.

== Results ==
=== Qualification ===
The qualification was held on 14 January at 14:30.

Rank	Bib	Name	Country	Run 1	Run 2	Best	Notes
1	2	Elisabeth Gram	Austria	80.25	87.00	87.00	Q
2	1	Marine Tripier Mondancin	France	81.00	68.50	81.00	Q
3	7	Tiril Sjåstad Christiansen	Norway	69.75	76.75	76.75	Q
4	3	Shannon Gunning	Canada	64.00	26.25	64.00	Q
5	4	Katie Summerhayes	Great Britain	55.50	54.75	55.50	Q
6	8	Alexia Bonelli	Switzerland	28.75	53.50	53.50	Q
7	5	Samantha Poots	New Zealand	23.00	52.00	52.00	
8	9	Nanaho Kiriyama	Japan	49.00	43.25	49.00	
9	6	Monika Loboda	Slovenia	24.00	41.00	41.00	
	10	Jeanee Crane-Mauzy	United States	DNS	DNS	DNS	

=== Final ===
The final was held on 15 January at 12:00.

Rank	Bib	Name	Country	Run 1	Run 2	Best
1st place, gold medalist(s)	2	Elisabeth Gram	Austria	84.75	82.75	84.75
2nd place, silver medalist(s)	7	Tiril Sjåstad Christiansen	Norway	79.25	39.00	79.25
3rd place, bronze medalist(s)	1	Marine Tripier Mondancin	France	69.25	69.50	69.50
4	3	Shannon Gunning	Canada	62.00	58.00	62.00
5	4	Katie Summerhayes	Great Britain	55.00	44.75	55.00
6	8	Alexia Bonelli	Switzerland	31.25	47.75	47.75
