= Short-track speed skating at the 2012 Winter Youth Olympics – Girls' 500 metres =

Girls' 500 metres at the I Winter Youth Olympic Games
- Venue: Eisschnelllaufbahn Innsbruck
- Dates: 19 January
- Competitors: 16 from 13 nations
- Winning time: 44.122

Medalists
1st place, gold medalist(s)		Shim Suk-hee	South Korea
2nd place, silver medalist(s)		Xu Aili	China
3rd place, bronze medalist(s)		Nicole Martinelli	Italy

The girls' 500 metres in short track speed skating at the 2012 Winter Youth Olympics was held on 19 January at the Eisschnelllaufbahn Innsbruck.

== Results ==
QAB – qualified for the semifinals A/B
QCD – qualified for the semifinals C/D
PEN – penalty
ADA – advanced

=== Quarterfinals ===
Rank	Heat	Name	Country	Time	Notes
1	1	Shim Suk-hee	South Korea	44.929	QAB
2	1	Anna Gamorina	Russia	46.382	QAB
3	1	Darya Goncharova	Kazakhstan	46.452	QCD
4	1	Lin Yu-tzu	Chinese Taipei	49.423	QCD
1	2	Qu Chunyu	China	46.378	QAB
2	2	Aafke Soet	Netherlands	47.770	QAB
3	2	Elisabeth Witt	Germany	49.788	QCD
	2	Arianna Sighel	Italy	PEN	
1	3	Sarah Warren	United States	48.241	QAB
2	3	Mariya Dolgopolova	Ukraine	49.624	QAB
3	3	Sumire Kikuchi	Japan	53.823	ADA
4	3	Park Jung-hyun	South Korea	1:00.289	QCD
1	4	Xu Aili	China	45.416	QAB
2	4	Nicole Martinelli	Italy	46.390	QAB
3	4	Tímea Tóth	Hungary	48.502	QCD
4	4	Melanie Brantner	Austria	53.635	QCD

=== Semifinals ===
==== Semifinals C/D ====
QC – qualified for Final C
QD – qualified for Final D

Rank	Heat	Name	Country	Time	Notes
1	1	Darya Goncharova	Kazakhstan	48.300	QC
2	1	Lin Yu-tzu	Chinese Taipei	48.598	QC
3	1	Melanie Brantner	Austria	51.375	QD
1	2	Park Jung-hyun	South Korea	46.948	QC
2	2	Tímea Tóth	Hungary	48.725	QC
3	2	Elisabeth Witt	Germany	49.737	QD

==== Semifinals A/B ====
QA – qualified for Final A
QB – qualified for Final B

Rank	Heat	Name	Country	Time	Notes
1	1	Shim Suk-hee	South Korea	44.444	QA
2	1	Qu Chunyu	China	45.624	QA
3	1	Sumire Kikuchi	Japan	46.200	QB
4	1	Anna Gamorina	Russia	1:07.177	QB
5	1	Mariya Dolgopolova	Ukraine	1:16.375	QB
1	2	Xu Aili	China	45.673	QA
2	2	Nicole Martinelli	Italy	46.679	QA
3	2	Aafke Soet	Netherlands	46.980	QB
4	2	Sarah Warren	United States	47.033	QB

=== Finals ===
PEN – penalty

==== Final D ====
Rank	Name	Country	Time	Notes
14	Elisabeth Witt	Germany	49.799	
15	Melanie Brantner	Austria	51.150	

==== Final C ====
Rank	Name	Country	Time	Notes
10	Park Jung-hyun	South Korea	46.339	
11	Darya Goncharova	Kazakhstan	46.802	
12	Tímea Tóth	Hungary	48.743	
13	Lin Yu-tzu	Chinese Taipei	49.492	

==== Final B ====
Rank	Name	Country	Time	Notes
5	Sarah Warren	United States	48.273	
6	Sumire Kikuchi	Japan	48.337	
7	Aafke Soet	Netherlands	48.362	
8	Mariya Dolgopolova	Ukraine	50.545	
9	Anna Gamorina	Russia	PEN	

==== Final A ====
Rank	Name	Country	Time	Notes
1st place, gold medalist(s)	Shim Suk-hee	South Korea	44.122	
2nd place, silver medalist(s)	Xu Aili	China	44.593	
3rd place, bronze medalist(s)	Nicole Martinelli	Italy	46.594	
4	Qu Chunyu	China	PEN	
