= Great Britain at the 2012 Winter Youth Olympics =

- IOC code: GBR
- NOC: British Olympic Association
- Website: www.teamgb.com

in Innsbruck
- Competitors: 24 in 10 sports
- Flag bearer: Katie Summerhayes
- Medals Ranked 24th: Gold 0 Silver 1 Bronze 0 Total 1

Winter Youth Olympics appearances (overview)
- 2012; 2016; 2020; 2024

Great Britain competed at the 2012 Winter Youth Olympics in Innsbruck, Austria. The British team consisted of 24 athletes competing in 10 different sports.

== Medalists ==
Mica McNeill and Jazmin Sawyers, in the two-girl Bobsled, won Great Britain's only medal at the Games.

Medal	Name	Sport	Event	Date
Silver	Mica McNeill; Jazmin Sawyers	Bobsleigh	Two-girls	22 Jan

In addition, two British athletes won medals as part of mixed nationality teams in short track speed skating.

Medal	Name	Sport	Event	Date
Gold	Jack Burrows	Short track	Mixed team relay	-
Silver	Aydin Djemal	Short track	Mixed team relay	-

== Alpine skiing ==
Boys

Athlete	Event	Final			
Athlete	Event	Run 1	Run 2	Total	Rank
Paul Henderson	Slalom	DNF			
Paul Henderson	Giant slalom	DNF			
Paul Henderson	Super-G			1:06.97	17
Paul Henderson	Combined	1:05.89	DNF		

Girls

Athlete	Event	Final			
Athlete	Event	Run 1	Run 2	Total	Rank
Rachelle Rogers	Slalom	DNF			
Rachelle Rogers	Giant slalom	1:03.61	DNF		
Rachelle Rogers	Super-G			1:11.05	24
Rachelle Rogers	Combined	DNF			

== Biathlon ==
Boys

Athlete	Event	Final		
Athlete	Event	Time	Misses	Rank
Calum Irvine	Sprint	22:28.5	5	35
Calum Irvine	Pursuit	33:33.1	6	29

== Bobsleigh ==
Boys

Athlete	Event	Final			
Athlete	Event	Run 1	Run 2	Total	Rank
Olly Biddulph; James Lelliott	Two-Boys	54.87	54.54	1:49.41	5

Girls

Athlete	Event	Final			
Athlete	Event	Run 1	Run 2	Total	Rank
Mica McNeill; Jazmin Sawyers	Two-Girls	56.29	55.66	1:51.95	2nd place, silver medalist(s)
Kirsten Emery; Frances Slater	Two-Girls	56.42	55.92	1:52.34	4

== Cross country skiing ==
Boys

Athlete	Event	Final	
Athlete	Event	Time	Rank
Scott Dixon	10km classical	35:02.2	37

Girls

Athlete	Event	Final	
Athlete	Event	Time	Rank
Sarah Hale	5km classical	17:44.0	32

Sprint

Athlete	Event	Qualification		Quarterfinal		Semifinal		Final	
Athlete	Event	Total	Rank	Total	Rank	Total	Rank	Total	Rank
Scott Dixon	Boys' sprint	1:52.40	33	did not advance					
Sarah Hale	Girls' sprint	2:06.66	25 Q	2:06.0	3	did not advance			

== Curling ==
Boys

- Skip: Duncan Menzies
- Second: Thomas Muirhead

Girls

- Third: Angharad Ward
- Lead: Rachel Hannen

=== Mixed Team ===
Final Round Robin Standings

Red Group	Skip	W	L
Sweden	Rasmus Wranå	6	1
Canada	Thomas Scoffin	5	2
Japan	Shingo Usui	4	3
Italy	Amos Mosaner	4	3
Great Britain	Duncan Menzies	3	4
Russia	Mikhail Vaskov	3	4
Austria	Mathias Genner	2	5
Germany	Daniel Rothballer	1	6

==== Round-robin results ====
Draw 1

Sheet B	1	2	3	4	5	6	7	8	Final
Great Britain (Menzies)	1	2	1	1	4	0	X	X	9
Austria (Genner) 🔨	0	0	0	0	0	1	X	X	1

Draw 2

Sheet C	1	2	3	4	5	6	7	8	Final
Sweden (Wranå) 🔨	4	0	0	0	0	1	0	1	6
Great Britain (Menzies)	0	1	1	0	0	0	2	0	4

Draw 3

Sheet A	1	2	3	4	5	6	7	8	9	Final
Great Britain (Menzies)	0	0	2	0	1	0	0	1	0	4
Germany (Rothballer) 🔨	0	1	0	1	0	2	0	0	1	5

Draw 4

Sheet D	1	2	3	4	5	6	7	8	Final
Canada (Scoffin) 🔨	1	2	0	4	0	1	X	X	8
Great Britain (Menzies)	0	0	0	0	2	0	X	X	2

Draw 5

Sheet A	1	2	3	4	5	6	7	8	9	Final
Japan (Usui)	0	1	0	0	0	2	0	2	2	7
Great Britain (Menzies) 🔨	1	0	0	0	2	0	2	0	0	5

Draw 6

Sheet B	1	2	3	4	5	6	7	8	Final
Italy (Mosaner) 🔨	1	0	0	2	0	2	0	0	5
Great Britain (Menzies)	0	0	3	0	1	0	2	1	7

Draw 7

Sheet D	1	2	3	4	5	6	7	8	Final
Great Britain (Menzies) 🔨	0	1	0	2	1	0	2	X	6
Russia (Vaskov)	1	0	1	0	0	1	0	X	3

=== Mixed doubles ===
Round of 32

Sheet C	1	2	3	4	5	6	7	8	Final
Thomas Scoffin (CAN); Kelsi Heath (NZL)	0	0	4	1	1	0	3	X	9
Mizuki Kitaguchi (JPN); Thomas Muirhead (GBR) 🔨	1	2	0	0	0	2	0	X	5

Sheet B	1	2	3	4	5	6	7	8	Final
Angharad Ward (GBR); Markus Skogvold (NOR) 🔨	3	1	0	1	0	3	0	0	8
Luke Steele (NZL); Johanna Heldin (SWE)	0	0	3	0	1	0	4	1	9

Sheet D	1	2	3	4	5	6	7	8	Final
Marek Černovský (CZE); Rachel Hannen (GBR)	0	2	1	2	0	0	2	1	8
Denise Pimpini (ITA); David Weyer (NZL) 🔨	2	0	0	0	2	1	0	0	5

Sheet A	1	2	3	4	5	6	7	8	9	Final
Eleanor Adviento (NZL); Romano Meier (SUI) 🔨	2	0	1	0	1	0	3	0	0	7
Duncan Menzies (GBR); Taylor Anderson (USA)	0	1	0	2	0	2	0	2	1	8

Round of 16

Sheet B	1	2	3	4	5	6	7	8	Final
Anastasia Moskaleva (RUS); Tsukasa Horigome (JPN) 🔨	1	0	2	2	1	1	X	X	7
Marek Černovský (CZE); Rachel Hannen (GBR)	0	1	0	0	0	0	X	X	1

Sheet D	1	2	3	4	5	6	7	8	Final
Duncan Menzies (GBR); Taylor Anderson (USA) 🔨	1	0	0	2	1	0	0	2	6
Rasmus Wranå (SWE); Kerli Zirk (EST)	0	1	1	0	0	1	1	0	4

Quarterfinals

Sheet C	1	2	3	4	5	6	7	8	Final
Duncan Menzies (GBR); Taylor Anderson (USA) 🔨	1	0	0	1	0	1	1	0	4
Yoo Min-hyeon (KOR); Mako Tamakuma (JPN)	0	2	1	0	3	0	0	1	7

== Figure skating ==
Pairs

Athlete(s)	Event	SP/OD		FS/FD		Total	
Athlete(s)	Event	Points	Rank	Points	Rank	Points	Rank
Millie Paterson; Edward Carstairs	Ice Dancing	30.70	11	40.35	12	71.05	11

Mixed

Athletes	Event	Boys'			Girls'			Ice Dance			Total	
Athletes	Event	Score	Rank	Points	Score	Rank	Points	Score	Rank	Points	Points	Rank
Team 1 Feodosi Efremenkov (RUS); Tina Stuerzinger (SUI); Millie Paterson/Edward Carstairs (GBR)	Team Trophy	117.13	1	8	73.46	5	4	44.02	8	1	13	5

== Freestyle skiing ==
Ski Half-Pipe

Athlete	Event	Qualifying		Final	
Athlete	Event	Points	Rank	Points	Rank
Tyler Harding	Boys' ski half-pipe	63.50	8 Q	62.75	10
Katie Summerhayes	Girls' ski half-pipe	55.50	5 Q	55.00	5

== Ice hockey ==
Boys

Athlete(s)	Event	Qualification		Grand final	
Athlete(s)	Event	Points	Rank	Points	Rank
Lewis Hook	Individual skills	7	12	did not advance	

Girls

Athlete(s)	Event	Qualification		Grand final	
Athlete(s)	Event	Points	Rank	Points	Rank
Katherine Gale	Individual skills	31	2 Q	17	5

== Short track speed skating ==
Boys

Athlete	Event	Quarterfinals		Semifinals		Finals	
Athlete	Event	Time	Rank	Time	Rank	Time	Rank
Jack Burrows	Boys' 500 metres	45.491	3 qCD	PEN		did not advance	
Jack Burrows	Boys' 1000 metres	1:34.981	2 Q	1:33.700	3 qB	1:41.172	3
Aydin Djemal	Boys' 500 metres	45.556	3 qCD	45.721	1 qC	1:02.356	4
Aydin Djemal	Boys' 1000 metres	1:33.582	3 qCD	1:37.035	1 qC	1:33.689	2

Mixed

Athlete	Event	Semifinals		Finals	
Athlete	Event	Time	Rank	Time	Rank
Team B Jung Hyun Park (KOR); Xiucheng Lu (CHN); Aili Xu (CHN); Jack Burrows (GBR)	Mixed Team Relay	4:21.656	1 Q	4:21.713	1st place, gold medalist(s)
Team F Qu Chunyu (CHN); Xu Hongzhi (CHN); Mariya Dolgopolova (UKR); Aydin Djemal (GBR)	Mixed Team Relay	4:21.227	1 Q	4:24.665	2nd place, silver medalist(s)

== Snowboarding ==
Boys

Athlete	Event	Qualifying			Semifinal			Final		
Athlete	Event	Run 1	Run 2	Rank	Run 1	Run 2	Rank	Run 1	Run 2	Rank
Lewis Courtier-Jones	Boys' halfpipe	46.75	60.00	7 q	59.75	41.25	8	did not advance		
Lewis Courtier-Jones	Boys' slopestyle	68.50	47.75	7 Q				39.50	32.00	16

== See also ==
- Great Britain at the 2012 Summer Olympics
