= Ukraine at the 2012 Winter Youth Olympics =

- IOC code: UKR
- NOC: National Olympic Committee of Ukraine
- Website: www.noc-ukr.org

in Innsbruck
- Competitors: 23 in 8 sports
- Flag bearer: Anton Dukach
- Medals Ranked 24th: Gold 0 Silver 1 Bronze 0 Total 1

Winter Youth Olympics appearances (overview)
- 2012; 2016; 2020; 2024

Ukraine competed at the 2012 Winter Youth Olympics in Innsbruck, Austria.

Some of the athletes later represented Ukraine at the Winter Olympics. Olena Stetskiv (luge) competed at the 2014, 2018, 2022 and 2026 Winter Olympics. Oleksii Krasovskyi (cross-country skiing) competed at the 2014, 2018, 2022 Winter Olympics. Anton Dukach (luge) competed at the 2018, 2022 and 2026 Winter Olympics. Anastasiya Merkushyna (biathlon), Aleksandra Nazarova and Maxim Nikitin (both figure skating) competed at the 2018 and 2022 Winter Olympics. Dmytro Mytsak (alpine skiing) represented Ukraine at the 2014 Winter Olympics. Yaroslav Paniot (figure skating) represented Ukraine at the 2018 Winter Olympics.

== Medalists ==
Medal	Name	Sport	Event	Date
Silver	Aleksandra Nazarova; Maxim Nikitin	Figure skating	Ice dancing	17 January

=== Medalists in mixed NOCs events ===
Medal	Name	Sport	Event	Date
Silver	Yaroslav Paniot	Figure skating	Team trophy	17 January
Silver	Mariya Dolgopolova	Short track speed skating	Mixed team relay	21 January

== Competitors ==
The following is the list of number of competitors (per gender) participating at the games per sport/discipline.

Sport	Boys	Girls	Total
Alpine skiing	1	1	2
Biathlon	2	2	4
Cross-country skiing	1	1	2
Figure skating	3	3	6
Luge	4	2	6
Nordic combined	1	0	1
Short track speed skating	0	1	1
Ski jumping	1	0	1
Total	13	10	23

== Alpine skiing ==
Ukraine qualified 2 athletes.

Boys

Athlete	Event	Final			
Athlete	Event	Run 1	Run 2	Total	Rank
Dmytro Mytsak	Slalom	46.30	44.34	1:30.64	26
Dmytro Mytsak	Giant slalom	1:03.03	59.88	2:02.91	28
Dmytro Mytsak	Super-G			1:08.89	27
Dmytro Mytsak	Combined	1:08.35	43.83	1:52.18	26

Girls

Athlete	Event	Final			
Athlete	Event	Run 1	Run 2	Total	Rank
Anastasiia Gorbunova	Slalom	48.73	DNF		
Anastasiia Gorbunova	Giant slalom	1:04.42	1:04.52	2:08.94	30
Anastasiia Gorbunova	Super-G			1:12.53	26
Anastasiia Gorbunova	Combined	1:12.84	DNS		

== Biathlon ==
Ukraine qualified 4 athletes.

Boys

Athlete	Event	Final		
Athlete	Event	Time	Misses	Rank
Dmytro Ihnatyev	Sprint	21:39.9	3	22
Dmytro Ihnatyev	Pursuit	33:24.0	8	27
Maksym Ivko	Sprint	20:28.4	3	7
Maksym Ivko	Pursuit	31:01.4	7	10

Girls

Athlete	Event	Final		
Athlete	Event	Time	Misses	Rank
Anastasiya Merkushyna	Sprint	19:01.7	3	13
Anastasiya Merkushyna	Pursuit	31:46.4	8	18
Yuliya Zhuravok	Sprint	19:23.1	2	18
Yuliya Zhuravok	Pursuit	29:16.8	0	8

Mixed

Athlete	Event	Final		
Athlete	Event	Time	Misses	Rank
Yuliya Zhuravok; Anastasiya Merkushyna; Dmytro Ihnatyev; Maksym Ivko	Mixed relay	1:14:47.5	3+12	4
Anastasiya Merkushyna; Oksana Shatalova; Maksym Ivko; Oleksii Krasovskyi	Cross-Country-Biathlon Mixed Relay	1:08:48.9	4+10	14

== Cross-country skiing ==
Ukraine qualified 2 athletes.

Boys

Athlete	Event	Final	
Athlete	Event	Time	Rank
Oleksii Krasovskyi	10km classical	31:53.0	20

Girls

Athlete	Event	Final	
Athlete	Event	Time	Rank
Oksana Shatalova	5km classical	16:22.0	15

Sprint

Athlete	Event	Qualification		Quarterfinal		Semifinal		Final	
Athlete	Event	Total	Rank	Total	Rank	Total	Rank	Total	Rank
Oleksii Krasovskyi	Boys' sprint	1:50.43	30 Q	1:49.8	5	did not advance			
Oksana Shatalova	Girls' sprint	2:06.58	24 Q	2:05.1	4	did not advance			

Mixed

Athlete	Event	Final		
Athlete	Event	Time	Misses	Rank
Anastasiya Merkushyna; Oksana Shatalova; Maksym Ivko; Oleksii Krasovskyi	Cross-Country-Biathlon Mixed Relay	1:08:48.9	4+10	14

== Figure skating ==
Ukraine qualified 6 athletes.

Boys

Athlete(s)	Event	SP/OD		FS/FD		Total	
Athlete(s)	Event	Points	Rank	Points	Rank	Points	Rank
Yaroslav Paniot	Singles	36.04	13	96.51	8	132.55	9

Girls

Athlete(s)	Event	SP/OD		FS/FD		Total	
Athlete(s)	Event	Points	Rank	Points	Rank	Points	Rank
Darin Khussein	Singles	39.77	10	69.54	11	109.31	9

Pairs

Athlete(s)	Event	SP/OD		FS/FD		Total	
Athlete(s)	Event	Points	Rank	Points	Rank	Points	Rank
Ielizaveta Usmantseva; Vladislav Lysoy	Pair Skating	34.81	5	60.54	5	95.35	5
Aleksandra Nazarova; Maxim Nikitin	Ice Dancing	57.44	2	74.24	2	131.68	2nd place, silver medalist(s)

Mixed

Athletes	Event	Boys'			Girls'			Ice Dance			Total	
Athletes	Event	Score	Rank	Points	Score	Rank	Points	Score	Rank	Points	Points	Rank
Team 2 Yaroslav Paniot (UKR); Eveliina Viljanen (FIN); Maria Simonova/Dmitri Dragun (RUS)	Team Trophy	85.06	5	4	76.27	3	6	76.02	3	6	16	2nd place, silver medalist(s)
Team 8 Timofei Novaikin (FRA); Sindra Kriisa (EST); Aleksandra Nazarova/Maxim Nikitin (UKR)	Team Trophy	99.56	4	5	58.52	8	1	78.44	2	7	13	4

== Luge ==
Ukraine qualified 6 athletes.

Boys

Athlete	Event	Final			
Athlete	Event	Run 1	Run 2	Total	Rank
Anton Dukach	Boys' singles	39.890	40.052	1:19.942	4
Yuriy Skyba	Boys' singles	40.237	40.349	1:20.596	16
Volodymyr Buryy; Anatolii Lehedza	Boys' doubles	44.028	DNS	-	-

Girls

Athlete	Event	Final			
Athlete	Event	Run 1	Run 2	Total	Rank
Galyna Kurechko	Girls' singles	41.107	40.916	1:22.023	13
Olena Stetskiv	Girls' singles	40.837	40.800	1:21.637	9

Team

Athlete	Event	Final				
Athlete	Event	Boys'	Girls'	Doubles	Total	Rank
Olena Stetskiv; Anton Dukach; Volodymyr Buryy; Anatolii Lehedza	Mixed Team Relay	45.556	46.852	47.781	2:20.189	7

== Nordic combined ==
Ukraine qualified 1 athlete.

Boys

Athlete	Event	Ski jumping		Cross-country		Final	
Athlete	Event	Points	Rank	Deficit	Ski Time	Total Time	Rank
Vitaliy Marchenko	Boys' individual	80.0	16	3:50	30:28.1	34:18.1	16

== Short track ==
Ukraine qualified 1 athlete.

Girls

Athlete	Event	Quarterfinals		Semifinals		Finals	
Athlete	Event	Time	Rank	Time	Rank	Time	Rank
Mariya Dolgopolova	Girls' 500 metres	49.624	2 Q	1:16.375	5 qB	50.545	4
Mariya Dolgopolova	Girls' 1000 metres	DNF		did not advance			

Mixed

Athlete	Event	Semifinals		Finals	
Athlete	Event	Time	Rank	Time	Rank
Team F Qu Chunyu (CHN); Xu Hongzhi (CHN); Mariya Dolgopolova (UKR); Aydin Djemal (GBR)	Mixed Team Relay	4:21.227	1 Q	4:24.665	2nd place, silver medalist(s)

== Ski jumping ==
Ukraine qualified 1 athlete.

Boys

Athlete	Event	1st Jump		2nd Jump		Overall	
Athlete	Event	Distance	Points	Distance	Points	Points	Rank
Serhiy Drozdov	Boys' individual	69.6m	107.6	68.0m	107.0	214.6	12

== See also ==
- Ukraine at the 2012 Summer Olympics
