= Luge at the 2012 Winter Youth Olympics – Boys' singles =

Boys' singles at the I Winter Youth Olympic Games
- Venue: Seefeld Arena
- Date: January 15
- Competitors: 25 from 19 nations
- Winning time: 1:19.603

Medalists
1st place, gold medalist(s)		Christian Paffe	Germany
2nd place, silver medalist(s)		Riks Rozītis	Latvia
3rd place, bronze medalist(s)		Toni Gräfe	Germany

The boys' singles competition of the luge events at the 2012 Winter Youth Olympics in Innsbruck, Austria, was held on January 15, at the Olympic Sliding Centre Innsbruck. 25 athletes from 17 different countries took part in this event.

== Results ==
Two runs were used to determine the winner.

Rank	Bib	Name	Country	Run 1	Run 2	Total	Difference
1st place, gold medalist(s)	10	Christian Paffe	Germany	39.737	39.866	1:19.603	
2nd place, silver medalist(s)	7	Riks Rozītis	Latvia	39.838	39.968	1:19.806	+0.203
3rd place, bronze medalist(s)	6	Toni Gräfe	Germany	39.982	39.938	1:19.920	+0.317
4	5	Anton Dukach	Ukraine	39.890	40.052	1:19.942	+0.339
5	11	Mitchel Malyk	Canada	40.096	39.947	1:20.043	+0.440
6	23	Rihards Lozbers	Latvia	40.110	40.003	1:20.113	+0.510
7	8	John Fennell	Canada	40.162	40.029	1:20.191	+0.588
8	21	Christian Maag	Switzerland	40.130	40.074	1:20.204	+0.601
9	4	Armin Frauscher	Austria	40.093	40.199	1:20.292	+0.689
10	13	Simon Kainzwaldner	Italy	40.222	40.104	1:20.326	+0.723
11	12	Alexander Stepichev	Russia	40.111	40.217	1:20.328	+0.725
12	1	Tucker West	United States	40.218	40.117	1:20.335	+0.732
13	2	Maksim Aravin	Russia	40.203	40.148	1:20.351	+0.748
14	14	Sergey Korzhnev	Kazakhstan	40.236	40.326	1:20.562	+0.959
15	17	Ty Andersen	United States	40.374	40.210	1:20.584	+0.981
16	16	Yuriy Skyba	Ukraine	40.237	40.349	1:20.596	+0.993
17	9	David Gleirscher	Austria	40.218	40.602	1:20.820	+1.217
18	3	Jozef Petrulák	Slovakia	40.718	40.493	1:21.211	+1.608
19	18	Alexander Ferlazzo	Australia	40.849	40.526	1:21.375	+1.772
20	25	Lien Te-an	Chinese Taipei	41.044	40.856	1:21.900	+2.297
21	15	Aleksandar Poibrenski	Bulgaria	41.275	41.153	1:22.428	+2.825
22	19	Jakub Firlej	Poland	41.243	41.325	1:22.568	+2.965
23	20	Daniel Popa	Romania	41.714	40.894	1:22.608	+3.005
24	24	Kerim Catal	Bosnia and Herzegovina	41.354	41.279	1:22.633	+3.030
25	22	Matheson Hill	New Zealand	42.677	41.357	1:24.034	+4.431
