= Mixed-NOCs at the Youth Olympics =

- The Olympic flag
- IOC code: MIX
- NOC: N/A
- Website: www.olympic.org
- Medals: Gold 0 Silver 0 Bronze 0 Total 0

Summer appearances
- 2010; 2014; 2018

Winter appearances
- 2012; 2016; 2020; 2024

Mixed-NOCs (IOC code: MIX) are Youth Olympic Games teams consisting of athletes representing different National Olympic Committees (NOCs). The concept of mixed-NOCs was introduced at the 2010 Summer Youth Olympics, in which athletes from different nations would compete in the same team. It was also used in multiple sports at the Winter Youth Olympics since 2012.

== Medal tables ==
=== Medals by Summer Games ===
| Games | Gold | Silver | Bronze | Total | Rank |
| 2010 Singapore | 9 | 8 | 11 | 28 | |
| (China) 2014 Nanjing | 13 | 12 | 14 | 39 | |
| (Argentina) 2018 Buenos Aires | 13 | 13 | 13 | 39 | |
| (Senegal) 2026 Dakar | | | | | |
| Total | 35 | 33 | 38 | 106 | |

=== Medals by Winter Games ===
| Games | Gold | Silver | Bronze | Total | Rank |
| (Austria) 2012 Innsbruck | 3 | 3 | 3 | 9 | |
| (Norway) 2016 Lillehammer | 4 | 4 | 5 | 13 | |
| (Switzerland) 2020 Lausanne | 6 | 6 | 6 | 18 | |
| (South Korea) 2024 Gangwon | — | | | | |
| Total | 13 | 13 | 14 | 40 | |

== See also ==
- Summer Youth Olympics
  - Mixed-NOCs at the 2010 Summer Youth Olympics
  - Mixed-NOCs at the 2014 Summer Youth Olympics
  - Mixed-NOCs at the 2018 Summer Youth Olympics
- Winter Youth Olympics
  - Mixed-NOCs at the 2012 Winter Youth Olympics
  - Mixed-NOCs at the 2016 Winter Youth Olympics
  - Mixed-NOCs at the 2020 Winter Youth Olympics
- Olympics
  - Mixed teams at the Olympics, several combined teams consisting of competitors from different countries, which competed between 1896 and 1904 in the (Summer) Olympics in addition to individual competitors competing for their country
  - Australasia at the Olympics, a combined team consisting of Australian and New Zealand competitors, which competed in the 1908 and 1912 (Summer) Olympic Games
  - United Team of Germany at the Olympics, a combined team consisting of West and East German competitors, which competed between 1956 and 1964 in the Summer and Winter Olympic Games
  - Unified Team at the Olympics, a combined team consisting of competitors from states of the former Soviet Union (except 3 Baltic countries whose NOC was recognized since 1991), which competed in the 1992 Winter and Summer Olympics
