= South Korea at the 2012 Winter Youth Olympics =

- IOC code: KOR
- NOC: Korean Olympic Committee
- Website: www.sports.or.kr

in Innsbruck
- Competitors: 28 in 12 sports
- Flag bearer: Dong-Woo Kim
- Medals Ranked 4th: Gold 6 Silver 3 Bronze 2 Total 11

Winter Youth Olympics appearances (overview)
- 2012; 2016; 2020; 2024

South Korea competed at the 2012 Winter Youth Olympics in Innsbruck, Austria.

== Medalists ==
| Medal | Name | Sport | Event | Date |
|---|---|---|---|---|
| Gold | Jang Mi | Speed skating | Girls' 500 m | 14 Jan |
| Gold | Jang Mi | Speed skating | Girls' 1500 m | 16 Jan |
| Gold | Hyo Jun-lim | Short track | Boys' 1000 m | 18 Jan |
| Gold | Shim Suk-hee | Short track | Girls' 1000 m | 18 Jan |
| Gold | Su Min-yoon | Short track | Boys' 500 m | 19 Jan |
| Gold | Shim Suk-hee | Short track | Girls' 500 m | 19 Jan |
| Silver | Su Min-yoon | Short track | Boys' 1000 m | 18 Jan |
| Silver | Hyo Jun-lim | Short track | Boys' 500 m | 19 Jan |
| Silver | Su Ji-jang | Speed skating | Girls' mass start | 20 Jan |
| Bronze | Hyeok Jun-noh | Speed skating | Boys' 3000 m | 18 Jan |
| Bronze | Su Ji-jang | Speed skating | Girls' 3000 m | 18 Jan |

== Alpine skiing ==
South Korea qualified 2 athletes.

Boys

| Athlete | Event | Final | | | |
| Athlete | Event | Run 1 | Run 2 | Total | Rank |
|---|---|---|---|---|---|
| Kim Dong-woo | Slalom | 41.85 | DNF | | |
| Kim Dong-woo | Giant slalom | DNF | | | |
| Kim Dong-woo | Super-G | | | 1:07.65 | 22 |
| Kim Dong-woo | Combined | 1:06.38 | 38.31 | 1:44.69 | 15 |

Girls

| Athlete | Event | Final | | | |
| Athlete | Event | Run 1 | Run 2 | Total | Rank |
|---|---|---|---|---|---|
| Jo Eun-hwa | Slalom | DNF | | | |
| Jo Eun-hwa | Giant slalom | 1:03.30 | 1:04.07 | 2:07.37 | 28 |
| Jo Eun-hwa | Super-G | | | 1:13.85 | 28 |
| Jo Eun-hwa | Combined | 1:12.71 | 41.86 | 1:54.57 | 25 |

== Biathlon ==
South Korea qualified 2 athletes.

Boys

| Athlete | Event | Final | | |
| Athlete | Event | Time | Misses | Rank |
|---|---|---|---|---|
| Cho Du-jin | Sprint | 22:35.8 | 3 | 38 |
| Cho Du-jin | Pursuit | 36:49.2 | 9 | 42 |

Girls

| Athlete | Event | Final | | |
| Athlete | Event | Time | Misses | Rank |
|---|---|---|---|---|
| Jang Ji-yeon | Sprint | 21:08.4 | 2 | 35 |
| Jang Ji-yeon | Pursuit | 37:07.5 | 6 | 40 |

Mixed

| Athlete | Event | Final | | |
| Athlete | Event | Time | Misses | Rank |
|---|---|---|---|---|
| Jiyeon Jang; Lee Yeong-ae; Cho Du-jin; Ji Won | Cross-country biathlon mixed relay | 1:20:14.2 | 7+12 | 24 |

== Bobsleigh ==
South Korea qualified 2 athletes.

Boys

| Athlete | Event | Final | | | |
| Athlete | Event | Run 1 | Run 2 | Total | Rank |
|---|---|---|---|---|---|
| Choi Jun-won; Choi Min-seo | Two-Boys | 55.43 | 55.81 | 1:51.24 | 10 |

== Cross-country skiing ==
South Korea qualified 2 athletes.

Boys

| Athlete | Event | Final | |
| Athlete | Event | Time | Rank |
|---|---|---|---|
| Ji Won | 10km classical | 36:24.0 | 40 |

Girls

| Athlete | Event | Final | |
| Athlete | Event | Time | Rank |
|---|---|---|---|
| Lee Yeong-ae | 5km classical | 18:12.6 | 33 |

Sprint

| Athlete | Event | Qualification | | Quarterfinal | | Semifinal | | Final | |
| Athlete | Event | Total | Rank | Total | Rank | Total | Rank | Total | Rank |
|---|---|---|---|---|---|---|---|---|---|
| Ji Won | Boys' sprint | 2:06.30 | 46 | did not advance | | | | | |
| Lee Yeong-ae | Girls' sprint | 2:27.20 | 38 | did not advance | | | | | |

Mixed

| Athlete | Event | Final | | |
| Athlete | Event | Time | Misses | Rank |
|---|---|---|---|---|
| Jang Ji-yeon; Lee Yeong-ae; Choi Du-jin; Ji Won | Cross-country biathlon mixed relay | 1:20:14.2 | 7+12 | 24 |

== Curling ==
South Korea qualified 1 team.

Roster

- Skip: Kang Sue-yeon
- Third: Yoo Min-hyeon
- Second: Kim Eun-bi
- Lead: Go Ke-on

=== Mixed team ===
Final Round Robin Standings

| Blue Group | Skip | W | L |
|---|---|---|---|
| United States | Korey Dropkin | 7 | 0 |
| Switzerland | Michael Brunner | 6 | 1 |
| Czech Republic | Marek Černovský | 4 | 3 |
| China | Bai Yang | 3 | 4 |
| Norway | Markus Skogvold | 3 | 4 |
| South Korea | Kang Sue-yeon | 2 | 5 |
| New Zealand | Luke Steele | 2 | 5 |
| Estonia | Robert-Kent Päll | 1 | 6 |

==== Round-robin results ====
Draw 1

| Sheet A | 1 | 2 | 3 | 4 | 5 | 6 | 7 | 8 | Final |
| South Korea (Kang) | 0 | 0 | 2 | 1 | 0 | 0 | 0 | X | 3 |
| Czech Republic (Černovský) 🔨 | 1 | 0 | 0 | 0 | 2 | 0 | 3 | X | 6 |

Draw 2

| Sheet B | 1 | 2 | 3 | 4 | 5 | 6 | 7 | 8 | Final |
| China (Bai) 🔨 | 2 | 0 | 1 | 0 | 1 | 3 | 1 | X | 8 |
| South Korea (Kang) | 0 | 0 | 0 | 1 | 0 | 0 | 0 | X | 1 |

Draw 3

| Sheet C | 1 | 2 | 3 | 4 | 5 | 6 | 7 | 8 | Final |
| United States (Dropkin) 🔨 | 2 | 0 | 0 | 0 | 1 | 0 | 4 | X | 7 |
| South Korea (Kang) | 0 | 0 | 2 | 1 | 0 | 1 | 0 | X | 4 |

Draw 4

| Sheet A | 1 | 2 | 3 | 4 | 5 | 6 | 7 | 8 | Final |
| Norway (Skogvold) | 0 | 0 | 1 | 1 | 0 | 0 | 1 | 0 | 3 |
| South Korea (Kang) 🔨 | 2 | 1 | 0 | 0 | 0 | 1 | 0 | 3 | 7 |

Draw 5

| Sheet D | 1 | 2 | 3 | 4 | 5 | 6 | 7 | 8 | Final |
| Estonia (Päll) 🔨 | 2 | 0 | 1 | 0 | 0 | 1 | 1 | 2 | 7 |
| South Korea (Kang) | 0 | 0 | 0 | 3 | 2 | 0 | 0 | 0 | 5 |

Draw 6

| Sheet B | 1 | 2 | 3 | 4 | 5 | 6 | 7 | 8 | Final |
| South Korea (Kang) | 0 | 0 | 0 | 1 | 0 | 1 | 0 | X | 2 |
| Switzerland (Brunner) 🔨 | 1 | 0 | 1 | 0 | 3 | 0 | 1 | X | 6 |

Draw 7

| Sheet C | 1 | 2 | 3 | 4 | 5 | 6 | 7 | 8 | Final |
| South Korea (Kang) 🔨 | 2 | 3 | 0 | 1 | 0 | 0 | 3 | X | 9 |
| New Zealand (Steele) | 0 | 0 | 1 | 0 | 2 | 1 | 0 | X | 4 |

=== Mixed doubles ===
==== Round of 32 ====
| Sheet A | 1 | 2 | 3 | 4 | 5 | 6 | 7 | 8 | Final |
| Michael Brunner (SUI); Nicole Muskatewitz (GER) 🔨 | 0 | 2 | 0 | 2 | 0 | 2 | 1 | 1 | 8 |
| Sarah Anderson (USA); Go Ke-on (KOR) | 1 | 0 | 4 | 0 | 1 | 0 | 0 | 0 | 6 |

| Sheet D | 1 | 2 | 3 | 4 | 5 | 6 | 7 | 8 | Final |
| Kang Sue-yeon (KOR); Krystof Krupanský (CZE) 🔨 | 3 | 1 | 0 | 3 | 0 | 2 | 1 | X | 10 |
| Daniel Rothballer (GER); Arianna Losano (ITA) | 0 | 0 | 2 | 0 | 3 | 0 | 0 | X | 5 |

| Sheet B | 1 | 2 | 3 | 4 | 5 | 6 | 7 | 8 | Final |
| Martin Sesaker (NOR); Kim Eun-bi (KOR) | 1 | 0 | 4 | 0 | 2 | 2 | 0 | X | 9 |
| Amalia Rudström (SWE); Kevin Lehmann (GER) 🔨 | 0 | 1 | 0 | 1 | 0 | 0 | 1 | X | 3 |

| Sheet C | 1 | 2 | 3 | 4 | 5 | 6 | 7 | 8 | Final |
| Frederike Manner (GER); Derek Oryniak (CAN) | 0 | 0 | 0 | 1 | 0 | 0 | X | X | 1 |
| Yoo Min-hyeon (KOR); Mako Tamakuma (JPN) 🔨 | 3 | 2 | 3 | 0 | 5 | 1 | X | X | 14 |

==== Round of 16 ====
| Sheet A | 1 | 2 | 3 | 4 | 5 | 6 | 7 | 8 | Final |
| Corryn Brown (CAN); Martin Reichel (AUT) 🔨 | 1 | 1 | 1 | 2 | 0 | 1 | 1 | 0 | 7 |
| Kang Sue-yeon (KOR); Krystof Krupanský (CZE) | 0 | 0 | 0 | 0 | 2 | 0 | 0 | 2 | 4 |

| Sheet D | 1 | 2 | 3 | 4 | 5 | 6 | 7 | 8 | Final |
| Yang Ying (CHN); Thomas Howell (USA) | 0 | 3 | 0 | 0 | 0 | 1 | 0 | X | 4 |
| Martin Sesaker (NOR); Kim Eun-bi (KOR) 🔨 | 2 | 0 | 2 | 1 | 2 | 0 | 3 | X | 10 |

| Sheet B | 1 | 2 | 3 | 4 | 5 | 6 | 7 | 8 | Final |
| Yoo Min-hyeon (KOR); Mako Tamakuma (JPN) 🔨 | 2 | 0 | 3 | 1 | 1 | 0 | 2 | X | 9 |
| Amos Mosaner (ITA); Irena Brettbacher (AUT) | 0 | 1 | 0 | 0 | 0 | 3 | 0 | X | 4 |

==== Quarterfinals ====
| Sheet A | 1 | 2 | 3 | 4 | 5 | 6 | 7 | 8 | 9 | Final |
| Martin Sesaker (NOR); Kim Eun-bi (KOR) 🔨 | 0 | 3 | 0 | 1 | 0 | 0 | 1 | 1 | 1 | 7 |
| Anastasia Moskaleva (RUS); Tsukasa Horigome (JPN) | 1 | 0 | 2 | 0 | 1 | 2 | 0 | 0 | 0 | 6 |

| Sheet C | 1 | 2 | 3 | 4 | 5 | 6 | 7 | 8 | Final |
| Duncan Menzies (GBR); Taylor Anderson (USA) 🔨 | 1 | 0 | 0 | 1 | 0 | 1 | 1 | 0 | 4 |
| Yoo Min-hyeon (KOR); Mako Tamakuma (JPN) | 0 | 2 | 1 | 0 | 3 | 0 | 0 | 1 | 7 |

==== Semifinals ====
| Sheet D | 1 | 2 | 3 | 4 | 5 | 6 | 7 | 8 | Final |
| Martin Sesaker (NOR); Kim Eun-bi (KOR) 🔨 | 0 | 5 | 0 | 2 | 0 | 2 | 1 | 3 | 13 |
| Yoo Min-hyeon (KOR); Mako Tamakuma (JPN) | 2 | 0 | 1 | 0 | 3 | 0 | 0 | 0 | 6 |

==== Bronze medal game ====
| Sheet B | 1 | 2 | 3 | 4 | 5 | 6 | 7 | 8 | 9 | Final |
| Korey Dropkin (USA); Marina Verenich (RUS) 🔨 | 1 | 0 | 1 | 0 | 2 | 0 | 1 | 0 | 1 | 6 |
| Yoo Min-hyeon (KOR); Mako Tamakuma (JPN) | 0 | 1 | 0 | 1 | 0 | 1 | 0 | 2 | 0 | 5 |

==== Gold medal game ====
| Sheet C | 1 | 2 | 3 | 4 | 5 | 6 | 7 | 8 | Final |
| Michael Brunner (SUI); Nicole Muskatewitz (GER) 🔨 | 3 | 2 | 0 | 4 | 0 | 4 | X | X | 13 |
| Martin Sesaker (NOR); Kim Eun-bi (KOR) | 0 | 0 | 1 | 0 | 1 | 0 | X | X | 2 |

== Figure skating ==
South Korea qualified 1 athlete.

Boys

| Athlete(s) | Event | SP/OD | | FS/FD | | Total | |
| Athlete(s) | Event | Points | Rank | Points | Rank | Points | Rank |
|---|---|---|---|---|---|---|---|
| Lee June-hyoung | Singles | 50.93 | 7 | 110.06 | 4 | 160.99 | 4 |

Girls

| Athlete(s) | Event | SP/OD | | FS/FD | | Total | |
| Athlete(s) | Event | Points | Rank | Points | Rank | Points | Rank |
|---|---|---|---|---|---|---|---|
| Park So-youn | Singles | 48.37 | 5 | 88.23 | 4 | 136.60 | 4 |

Mixed

| Athletes | Event | Boys' | | | Girls' | | | Ice Dance | | | Total | |
| Athletes | Event | Score | Rank | Points | Score | Rank | Points | Score | Rank | Points | Points | Rank |
|---|---|---|---|---|---|---|---|---|---|---|---|---|
| Team 6 Alexander Lyan (KAZ); Park So-youn (KOR); Estelle Elizabeth/Romain Le Gac (FRA) | Team Trophy | 60.45 | 8 | 1 | 96.84 | 1 | 8 | 66.88 | 4 | 5 | 14 | 3rd place, bronze medalist(s) |
| Team 7 Lee June-hyoung (KOR); Micol Cristini (ITA); Victoria-Laura Lohmus/Andrei Davodov (EST) | Team Trophy | 109.30 | 3 | 6 | 65.60 | 6 | 3 | 45.60 | 6 | 3 | 12 | 7 |

== Freestyle skiing ==
South Korea qualified 1 athlete.

Half-pipe

| Athlete | Event | Qualifying | | Final | |
| Athlete | Event | Points | Rank | Points | Rank |
|---|---|---|---|---|---|
| Kim Kwang-jin | Boys' half-pipe | 58.50 | 10 Q | 67.75 | 8 |

== Ice hockey ==
South Korea qualified 2 athletes.

Boys

| Athlete(s) | Event | Qualification | | Grand final | |
| Athlete(s) | Event | Points | Rank | Points | Rank |
|---|---|---|---|---|---|
| Cho Ji-hyun | Individual skills | 11 | 10 | did not advance | |

Girls

| Athlete(s) | Event | Qualification | | Grand final | |
| Athlete(s) | Event | Points | Rank | Points | Rank |
|---|---|---|---|---|---|
| Lee Yeon-jeong | Individual skills | 2 | 13 | did not advance | |

== Short track speed skating ==
South Korea qualified 4 athletes.

Boys

| Athlete | Event | Quarterfinals | | Semifinals | | Finals | |
| Athlete | Event | Time | Rank | Time | Rank | Time | Rank |
|---|---|---|---|---|---|---|---|
| Lim Hyo-jun | Boys' 500 metres | 44.291 | 1 Q | 42.911 | 2 Q | 42.482 | 2nd place, silver medalist(s) |
| Lim Hyo-jun | Boys' 1000 metres | 1:32.445 | 1 Q | 1:29.442 | 1 Q | 1:29.284 | 1st place, gold medalist(s) |
| Su Min-yoon | Boys' 500 metres | 43.310 | 1 Q | 42.468 | 1 Q | 42.417 | 1st place, gold medalist(s) |
| Su Min-yoon | Boys' 1000 metres | 1:31.887 | 1 Q | 1:31.239 | 1 Q | 1:29.428 | 2nd place, silver medalist(s) |

Girls

| Athlete | Event | Quarterfinals | | Semifinals | | Finals | |
| Athlete | Event | Time | Rank | Time | Rank | Time | Rank |
|---|---|---|---|---|---|---|---|
| Park Jung-hyun | Girls' 500 metres | 1:00.289 | 4 qCD | 46.948 | 1 qC | 46.339 | 1 |
| Park Jung-hyun | Girls' 1000 metres | 1:36.331 | 1 Q | 1:33.823 | 1 Q | DSQ | |
| Shim Suk-hee | Girls' 500 metres | 44.929 | 1 Q | 44.444 | 1 Q | 44.122 | 1st place, gold medalist(s) |
| Shim Suk-hee | Girls' 1000 metres | 1:37.066 | 1 Q | 1:34.809 | 1 Q | 1:31.661 | 1st place, gold medalist(s) |

Mixed

| Athlete | Event | Semifinals | | Finals | |
| Athlete | Event | Time | Rank | Time | Rank |
|---|---|---|---|---|---|
| Team A Shim Suk-hee (KOR); Yoann Martinez (FRA); Melanie Brantner (AUT); Denis Ayrapetyan (RUS) | Mixed Team Relay | 4:21.668 | 2 Q | 4:26.352 | 3rd place, bronze medalist(s) |
| Team B Park Jung-hyun (KOR); Lu Xiucheng (CHN); Xu Aili (CHN); Jack Burrows (GBR) | Mixed Team Relay | 4:21.656 | 1 Q | 4:21.713 | 1st place, gold medalist(s) |
| Team G Dariya Goncharova (KAZ); Su Min-yoon (KOR); Arianna Sighel (ITA); Dominic Andermann (AUT) | Mixed Team Relay | 4:22.356 | 3 qB | PEN | |
| Team H Anna Gamorina (RUS); Lim Hyo-jun (KOR); Aafke Soet (NED); Michal Prokop (CZE) | Mixed Team Relay | 4:26.027 | 2 Q | PEN | |

== Skeleton ==
South Korea qualified 1 athlete.

Boys

| Athlete | Event | Final | | | |
| Athlete | Event | Run 1 | Run 2 | Total | Rank |
|---|---|---|---|---|---|
| Kim Ban-seok | Boys' individual | 1:01.34 | 59.08 | 2:00.42 | 12 |

== Snowboarding ==
South Korea qualified 2 athletes.

While formally listed on the team Jeong Hae-rim was not listed to compete in any events.

Boys

| Athlete | Event | Qualifying | | | Semifinal | | | Final | | |
| Athlete | Event | Run 1 | Run 2 | Rank | Run 1 | Run 2 | Rank | Run 1 | Run 2 | Rank |
|---|---|---|---|---|---|---|---|---|---|---|
| Na Myung-joo | Boys' halfpipe | 54.75 | 37.00 | 8 q | 65.00 | 45.00 | 7 | did not advance | | |

== Speed skating ==
South Korea qualified 4 athletes.

Boys

| Athlete | Event | Race 1 | Race 2 | Total | Rank |
|---|---|---|---|---|---|
| Park Dai-han | Boys' 500 m | 39.41 | 39.46 | 78.87 | 6 |
| Park Dai-han | Boys' mass start | | | 7:35.00 | 19 |
| Hyeok Jun-noh | Boys' 1500 m | | | 2:02.19 | 4 |
| Hyeok Jun-noh | Boys' 3000 m | | | 4:14.41 | 3rd place, bronze medalist(s) |
| Hyeok Jun-noh | Boys' mass start | | | 7:26.72 | 16 |

Girls

| Athlete | Event | Race 1 | Race 2 | Total | Rank |
|---|---|---|---|---|---|
| Jang Mi | Girls' 500 m | 40.88 | 40.80 | 81.68 | 1st place, gold medalist(s) |
| Jang Mi | Girls' 1500 m | | | 2:08.17 | 1st place, gold medalist(s) |
| Jang Mi | Girls' mass start | | | 6:07.44 | 9 |
| Su Ji-jang | Girls' 3000 m | | | 4:42.72 | 3rd place, bronze medalist(s) |
| Su Ji-jang | Girls' mass start | | | 6:01.13 | 2nd place, silver medalist(s) |

== See also ==
- South Korea at the 2012 Summer Olympics
