= 2012 Winter Youth Olympics medal table =

The 2012 Winter Youth Olympics medal table is a list of National Olympic Committees (NOCs) ranked by the number of gold medals won by their athletes during the 2012 Winter Youth Olympics, held in Innsbruck, Austria, from January 13 to January 22, 2012. Approximately 1,059 athletes from 70 NOCs participated in 63 events in 15 sports.

Andorra and Monaco won their first ever Olympic medal, while Morocco won its first ever Winter Olympic event medal (also in the process winning Africa's first ever medal at a Winter sport competition).

== Medal table ==
The ranking in this table is based on information provided by the International Olympic Committee (IOC) and is consistent with IOC convention in its published medal tables. By default, the table is ordered by the number of gold medals the athletes from a nation have won (in this context, a "nation" is an entity represented by a National Olympic Committee). The number of silver medals is taken into consideration next and then the number of bronze medals. If nations are still tied, equal ranking is given and they are listed alphabetically.

In a number of events, there were teams in which athletes from different nations competed together. Medals won by these teams are included in the table as medals awarded to a mixed-NOCs team. There were eight events composed entirely of mixed-NOCs teams. As such all medals in those events – 3 golds, 3 silvers and 3 bronzes – were swept by mixed-NOCs teams. This mixed-NOCs listing is not given a ranking.

* Host nation (Austria)

| Rank | Nation | Gold | Silver | Bronze | Total |
|---|---|---|---|---|---|
| 1 | Germany | 8 | 7 | 2 | 17 |
| 2 | China | 7 | 4 | 4 | 15 |
| 3 | Austria* | 6 | 4 | 3 | 13 |
| 4 | South Korea | 6 | 3 | 2 | 11 |
| 5 | Russia | 5 | 4 | 7 | 16 |
| 6 | Netherlands | 4 | 1 | 2 | 7 |
| – | Mixed-NOCs | 3 | 3 | 3 | 9 |
| 7 | Switzerland | 3 | 0 | 5 | 8 |
| 8 | Japan | 2 | 5 | 9 | 16 |
| 9 | Norway | 2 | 5 | 2 | 9 |
| 10 | United States | 2 | 3 | 3 | 8 |
| 11 | France | 2 | 2 | 5 | 9 |
| 12 | Italy | 2 | 2 | 1 | 5 |
| 13 | Finland | 2 | 2 | 0 | 4 |
| 13 | Sweden | 2 | 2 | 0 | 4 |
| 15 | Canada | 2 | 1 | 6 | 9 |
| 16 | Slovenia | 1 | 4 | 2 | 7 |
| 17 | Latvia | 1 | 1 | 1 | 3 |
| 18 | Czech Republic | 1 | 1 | 0 | 2 |
| 19 | Morocco | 1 | 0 | 0 | 1 |
| 19 | Slovakia | 1 | 0 | 0 | 1 |
| 21 | Estonia | 0 | 2 | 0 | 2 |
| 21 | Hungary | 0 | 2 | 0 | 2 |
| 23 | Kazakhstan | 0 | 1 | 2 | 3 |
| 24 | Belarus | 0 | 1 | 0 | 1 |
| 24 | Belgium | 0 | 1 | 0 | 1 |
| 24 | Great Britain | 0 | 1 | 0 | 1 |
| 24 | Ukraine | 0 | 1 | 0 | 1 |
| 28 | Australia | 0 | 0 | 2 | 2 |
| 29 | Andorra | 0 | 0 | 1 | 1 |
| 29 | Monaco | 0 | 0 | 1 | 1 |
| Totals (30 entries) | | 63 | 63 | 63 | 189 |

Source: IOC
