= Elisabeth Gram =

Austrian freestyle skier

Personal information
- Born: 17 April 1996 (age 30) Zams, Austria
- Height: 1.66 m (5 ft 5 in)

Sport
- Country: Austria
- Sport: Freestyle skiing
- Event: Halfpipe

Elisabeth Gram (born 17 April 1996) is an Austrian freestyle skier. She competed in the 2018 Winter Olympics in the women's halfpipe.
