= Hungary at the 2012 Winter Youth Olympics =

- IOC code: HUN
- NOC: Hungarian Olympic Committee
- Website: www.olympic-hun.org

in Innsbruck
- Competitors: 9 in 6 sports
- Flag bearer: David Panyik
- Medals Ranked 21st: Gold 0 Silver 2 Bronze 0 Total 2

Winter Youth Olympics appearances (overview)
- 2012; 2016; 2020; 2024

Hungary competed at the 2012 Winter Youth Olympics in Innsbruck, Austria. The Hungarian team consisted of 9 athletes in 6 different sports.

== Medalists ==
Medal	Name	Sport	Event	Date
Silver	Attila Kovacs	Ice hockey	Boys' individual skills	19 Jan
Silver	Fanni Gasparics	Ice hockey	Girls' individual skills	19 Jan

== Alpine skiing ==
Hungary qualified one boy and girl in alpine skiing.

Boy

Athlete	Event	Final			
Athlete	Event	Run 1	Run 2	Total	Rank
Marton Kekesi	Slalom	44.57	41.99	1:26.56	21
Marton Kekesi	Giant slalom	1:02.15	57.76	1:59.91	21
Marton Kekesi	Super-G			1:11.70	34
Marton Kekesi	Combined	1:09.58	41.43	1:51.01	24

Girl

Athlete	Event	Final			
Athlete	Event	Run 1	Run 2	Total	Rank
Zsuzsanna Ury	Slalom	51.11	46.79	1:37.90	23
Zsuzsanna Ury	Giant slalom	1:06.85	1:09.02	2:15.87	33
Zsuzsanna Ury	Super-G			1:14.36	29
Zsuzsanna Ury	Combined	DNF			

== Biathlon ==
Hungary qualified one boy.

Boy

Athlete	Event	Final		
Athlete	Event	Time	Misses	Rank
David Panyik	Sprint	24:25.9	5	48
David Panyik	Pursuit	39:35.7	10	46

== Cross country skiing ==
Hungary qualified one boy.

Boy

Athlete	Event	Final	
Athlete	Event	Time	Rank
Zeno Bodnar	10km classical	37:22.3	43

Sprint

Athlete	Event	Qualification		Quarterfinal		Semifinal		Final	
Athlete	Event	Total	Rank	Total	Rank	Total	Rank	Total	Rank
Zeno Bodnar	Boys' sprint	1:53.69	34	did not advance					

== Ice hockey ==
Hungary qualified one boy and girl to compete in the skills challenge competition.

Boy

Athlete(s)	Event	Qualification		Grand final	
Athlete(s)	Event	Points	Rank	Points	Rank
Attila Kovacs	Individual skills	26	3 Q	22	Silver medal

Girl

Athlete(s)	Event	Qualification		Grand final	
Athlete(s)	Event	Points	Rank	Points	Rank
Fanni Gasparics	Individual skills	24	3 Q	19	Silver medal

== Short track speed skating ==
Hungary qualified one male and one female short track speed skater.

Boy

Athlete	Event	Quarterfinals		Semifinals		Finals	
Athlete	Event	Time	Rank	Time	Rank	Time	Rank
Tamas Farkas	Boys' 500 metres	46.037	3 qCD	45.777	2 qC	46.035	1
Tamas Farkas	Boys' 1000 metres	1:33.101	4 qCD	1:55.852	3 qD	1:34.395	1

Girl

Athlete	Event	Quarterfinals		Semifinals		Finals	
Athlete	Event	Time	Rank	Time	Rank	Time	Rank
Timea Toth	Girls' 500 metres	48.502	3 qCD	48.725	2 qC	48.743	3
Timea Toth	Girls' 1000 metres	DNF		did not advance			

Mixed team relay

Athlete	Event	Semifinals		Finals	
Athlete	Event	Time	Rank	Time	Rank
Nicole Martinelli (ITA); Milan Grugni (ITA); Tamas Farkas (HUN); Timea Toth (HUN)	Mixed team relay	4:28.026	3 qB	4:29.686	2

== Ski jumping ==
Hungary qualified one boy in ski jumping.

Boy

Athlete	Event	1st Jump		2nd Jump		Overall	
Athlete	Event	Distance	Points	Distance	Points	Points	Rank
Akos Szilagyi	Boys' individual	60.5m	90.0	60.0m	87.8	177.8	20

== See also ==
- Hungary at the 2012 Summer Olympics
