= France at the 2012 Winter Youth Olympics =

- IOC code: FRA
- NOC: French Olympic Committee
- Website: franceolympique.com

in Innsbruck
- Competitors: 29 in 10 sports
- Flag bearer: Estelle Alphand
- Medals Ranked 11th: Gold 2 Silver 2 Bronze 5 Total 9

Winter Youth Olympics appearances
- 2012; 2016; 2020; 2024

France competed at the 2012 Winter Youth Olympics in Innsbruck, Austria. The French team consisted of 29 athletes competing in 10 different sports.

== Medalists ==
Medal	Name	Sport	Event	Date
Gold	Estelle Alphand	Alpine skiing	Girls' super-G	14 Jan
Gold	Clara Direz	Alpine skiing	Girls' giant slalom	18 Jan
Silver	Estelle Alphand	Alpine skiing	Girls' combined	15 Jan
Silver	Estelle Alphand	Alpine skiing	Girls' giant slalom	18 Jan
Bronze	Aristide Begue	Biathlon	Boys' sprint	15 Jan
Bronze	Marine Tripier Mondancin	Freestyle skiing	Girls' halfpipe	15 Jan
Bronze	Lucile Lefevre	Snowboarding	Girls' halfpipe	15 Jan
Bronze	Estelle Alphand; Victor Schuller; Clara Direz; Leny Herpin	Alpine skiing	Parallel mixed team	17 Jan
Bronze	Aristide Begue; Fabien Claude; Léa Ducordeau; Chloé Chevalier	Biathlon	Mixed relay	19 Jan

== Alpine skiing ==
Boys

Athlete	Event	Final			
Athlete	Event	Run 1	Run 2	Total	Rank
Leny Herpin	Slalom	DNF			
Leny Herpin	Giant slalom	DNF			
Leny Herpin	Super-G			DNF	
Leny Herpin	Combined	1:05.10	37.15	1:42.25	5
Victor Schuller	Slalom	43.21	40.52	1:23.73	15
Victor Schuller	Giant slalom	57.35	DNF		
Victor Schuller	Super-G			1:04.81	4
Victor Schuller	Combined	1:04.65	39.00	1:43.65	12

Girls

Athlete	Event	Final			
Athlete	Event	Run 1	Run 2	Total	Rank
Estelle Alphand	Slalom	42.76	39.46	1:22.22	6
Estelle Alphand	Giant slalom	57.69	58.65	1:56.34	2nd place, silver medalist(s)
Estelle Alphand	Super-G			1:05.78	1st place, gold medalist(s)
Estelle Alphand	Combined	1:04.74	36.67	1:41.41	2nd place, silver medalist(s)
Clara Direz	Slalom	DNF			
Clara Direz	Giant slalom	57.58	58.55	1:56.13	1st place, gold medalist(s)
Clara Direz	Super-G			1:06.09	4
Clara Direz	Combined	1:05.64	36.67	1:42.31	6

Team

Athlete	Event	Quarterfinals	Semifinals	Final	Rank
Estelle Alphand; Victor Schuller; Clara Direz; Leny Herpin	Parallel mixed team	Slovenia; W 2-2	Austria; L 2-2	Italy; W 3-1	3rd place, bronze medalist(s)

== Biathlon ==
Boys

Athlete	Event	Final		
Athlete	Event	Time	Misses	Rank
Aristide Begue	Sprint	19:48.5	1	3rd place, bronze medalist(s)
Aristide Begue	Pursuit	30:22.2	7	8
Fabien Claude	Sprint	21:05.9	4	16
Fabien Claude	Pursuit	31:06.2	6	11

Girls

Athlete	Event	Final		
Athlete	Event	Time	Misses	Rank
Chloé Chevalier	Sprint	18:55.8	3	12
Chloé Chevalier	Pursuit	31:17.6	7	15
Lea Ducordeau	Sprint	19:13.6	2	15
Lea Ducordeau	Pursuit	30:59.2	5	13

Mixed

Athlete	Event	Final		
Athlete	Event	Time	Misses	Rank
Lea Ducordeau; Chloé Chevalier; Fabien Claude; Aristide Begue	Mixed relay	1:13:27.8	1+12	3rd place, bronze medalist(s)
Lea Ducordeau; Constance Vulliet; Fabien Claude; Thomas Chambellant	Cross-Country-Biathlon Mixed Relay	1:06:01.9	0+5	5

== Cross country skiing ==
Boys

Athlete	Event	Final	
Athlete	Event	Time	Rank
Thomas Chambellant	10km classical	31:55.0	21
Richard Jouve	10km classical	32:01.8	23

Girls

Athlete	Event	Final	
Athlete	Event	Time	Rank
Alison Perrillat-Amede	5km classical	17:41.7	31
Constance Vulliet	5km classical	17:15.0	27

Sprint

Athlete	Event	Qualification		Quarterfinal		Semifinal		Final	
Athlete	Event	Total	Rank	Total	Rank	Total	Rank	Total	Rank
Thomas Chambellant	Boys' sprint	1:49.45	24 Q	1:51.7	4	did not advance			
Richard Jouve	Boys' sprint	1:50.07	28 Q	1:47.5	5	did not advance			
Alison Perrillat-Amede	Girls' sprint	2:13.27	33	did not advance					
Constance Vulliet	Girls' sprint	2:10.67	28 Q	2:13.5	6	did not advance			

Mixed

Athlete	Event	Final		
Athlete	Event	Time	Misses	Rank
Lea Ducordeau; Constance Vulliet; Fabien Claude; Thomas Chambellant	Cross-Country-Biathlon Mixed Relay	1:06:01.9	0+5	5

== Figure skating ==
Boys

Athlete(s)	Event	SP/OD		FS/FD		Total	
Athlete(s)	Event	Points	Rank	Points	Rank	Points	Rank
Timofei Novaikin	Singles	52.47	5	94.76	9	147.23	8

Girls

Athlete(s)	Event	SP/OD		FS/FD		Total	
Athlete(s)	Event	Points	Rank	Points	Rank	Points	Rank
Anais Ventard	Singles	49.85	4	86.23	6	136.08	5

Pairs

Athlete(s)	Event	SP/OD		FS/FD		Total	
Athlete(s)	Event	Points	Rank	Points	Rank	Points	Rank
Estelle Elizabeth; Romain Le Gac	Ice Dancing	42.60	6	63.82	5	106.42	5

Mixed

Athletes	Event	Boys'			Girls'			Ice Dance			Total	
Athletes	Event	Score	Rank	Points	Score	Rank	Points	Score	Rank	Points	Points	Rank
Team 3 Carlo Vittorio Palermo (ITA); Anais Ventard (FRA); Jana Cejkova/Alexandr Sinicyn (CZE)	Team Trophy	75.71	7	2	76.09	4	5	54.72	5	4	11	8
Team 6 Alexander Lyan (KAZ); Park So-youn (KOR); Estelle Elizabeth/Romain Le Gac (FRA)	Team Trophy	60.45	8	1	96.84	1	8	66.88	4	5	14	3rd place, bronze medalist(s)
Team 8 Timofei Novaikin (FRA); Sindra Kriisa (EST); Aleksandra Nazarova/Maxim Nikitin (UKR)	Team Trophy	99.56	4	5	58.52	8	1	78.44	2	7	13	4

== Freestyle skiing ==
Ski Cross

Athlete	Event	Qualifying		1/4 finals	Semifinals	Final
Athlete	Event	Time	Rank	Rank	Rank	Rank
Bastien Girard	Boys' ski cross	59.27	11	Cancelled		
Emma Vorger	Girls' ski cross	1:01.87	9	Cancelled		

Ski Half-Pipe

Athlete	Event	Qualifying		Final	
Athlete	Event	Points	Rank	Points	Rank
Cesar Fabre	Boys' ski half-pipe	64.00	7 Q	79.25	5
Marine Tripier Mondancin	Girls' ski half-pipe	81.00	2 Q	69.50	3rd place, bronze medalist(s)

== Ice hockey ==
Boys

Athlete(s)	Event	Qualification		Grand final	
Athlete(s)	Event	Points	Rank	Points	Rank
Thibaut Colombin	Individual skills	5	14	did not advance	

Girls

Athlete(s)	Event	Qualification		Grand final	
Athlete(s)	Event	Points	Rank	Points	Rank
Morgane Rihet	Individual skills	17	6 Q	16	6

== Nordic combined ==
Boys

Athlete	Event	Ski jumping		Cross-country		Final	
Athlete	Event	Points	Rank	Deficit	Ski Time	Total Time	Rank
Tom Balland	Boys' individual	104.7	14	2:11	28:52.7	31:03.7	12

== Short track speed skating ==
Boys

Athlete	Event	Quarterfinals		Semifinals		Finals	
Athlete	Event	Time	Rank	Time	Rank	Time	Rank
Yoann Martinez	Boys' 500 metres	PEN		did not advance			
Yoann Martinez	Boys' 1000 metres	1:33.762	2 Q	1:32.564	3 qB	1:40.840	2

Mixed

Athlete	Event	Semifinals		Finals	
Athlete	Event	Time	Rank	Time	Rank
Team A Shim Suk-hee (KOR); Yoann Martinez (FRA); Melanie Brantner (AUT); Denis Ayrapetyan (RUS)	Mixed Team Relay	4:21.668	2 Q	4:26.352	3rd place, bronze medalist(s)

== Ski jumping ==
Boys

Athlete	Event	1st Jump		2nd Jump		Overall	
Athlete	Event	Distance	Points	Distance	Points	Points	Rank
Arthur Royer	Boys' individual	66.5m	105.9	61.5m	93.9	199.8	15

Girls

Athlete	Event	1st Jump		2nd Jump		Overall	
Athlete	Event	Distance	Points	Distance	Points	Points	Rank
Lea Lemare	Girls' individual	67.0m	108.6	70.5m	117.5	226.1	4

Team w/Nordic Combined

Athlete	Event	1st Round	2nd Round	Total	Rank
Lea Lemare; Tom Balland; Arthur Royer	Mixed Team	227.2	283.3	510.5	9

== Snowboarding ==
Boys

Athlete	Event	Qualifying			Semifinal			Final		
Athlete	Event	Run 1	Run 2	Rank	Run 1	Run 2	Rank	Run 1	Run 2	Rank
Victor Habermacher	Boys' halfpipe	52.50	29.00	9 q	36.35	35.75	11	did not advance		
Victor Habermacher	Boys' slopestyle	DNS						did not advance		
Yannis Tourki	Boys' halfpipe	62.50	39.00	6 q	70.50	71.25	4 Q	63.00	57.25	9
Yannis Tourki	Boys' slopestyle	38.00	35.25	13				did not advance		

Girls

Athlete	Event	Qualifying			Semifinal			Final		
Athlete	Event	Run 1	Run 2	Rank	Run 1	Run 2	Rank	Run 1	Run 2	Rank
Lucile Lefevre	Girls' halfpipe	70.75	75.75	3 Q				82.25	29.75	3rd place, bronze medalist(s)
Lucile Lefevre	Girls' slopestyle	36.75	69.25	8 Q				36.25	42.25	9

== See also ==
- France at the 2012 Summer Olympics
