= Kei Saito =

Japanese short track speed skater (born 1996)

Personal information
- Native name: 齋藤慧
- National team: Japan
- Citizenship: Japan
- Born: February 20, 1996 (age 30) Japan
- Education: Kanagawa University
- Occupations: Short-track speed skater Student
- Height: 161 cm (5 ft 3 in)
- Weight: 55 kg (121 lb)

Sport
- Country: Japan
- Sport: Speed skating
- Position: Reserve
- Short-track: Men's 500 metre Men's 1,000 metre Men's 1,500 metre Men's 5,000 metre relay
- Coached by: Jonathan Guilmette; Saburo Imai
- Retired: 2018

Kei Saito (齋藤慧, Saitō Kei) is a Japanese former short-track speed skater.

At the 2018 Winter Olympics, Saito tested positive for acetazolamide and was provisionally suspended and withdrawn before competing. In 2019 he was issued with a reprimand as he "bore no significant and only a light degree of fault" and received no sanction.
