= Thomas Hong =

American short-track speed skater

Personal information
- Full name: Thomas Insuk Hong
- Nationality: American
- Born: July 2, 1997 (age 29) Seoul, South Korea
- Height: 1.73 m (5 ft 8 in)
- Weight: 64 kg (141 lb)

Sport
- Country: United States
- Sport: Short track speed skating
Medal record
Men's short-track speed skating
Representing the United States
World Junior Championships
Silver medal – second place	2017 Innsbruck	500 m
Bronze medal – third place	2017 Innsbruck	3000 m relay

Thomas Insuk Hong (born July 2, 1997) is an American short track speed skater. He competed in the 2018 Winter Olympics.

== Early life and education ==
Hong was born in Seoul, South Korea to parents Hang Jung and DooPyeo Hong. Hong immigrated to the United States as a child. He was raised in Laurel, Maryland and graduated from Atholton High School. He currently attends University of Maryland, College Park.

Hong speaks Korean and English.
