= Xu Hongzhi =

Chinese short track speed skater

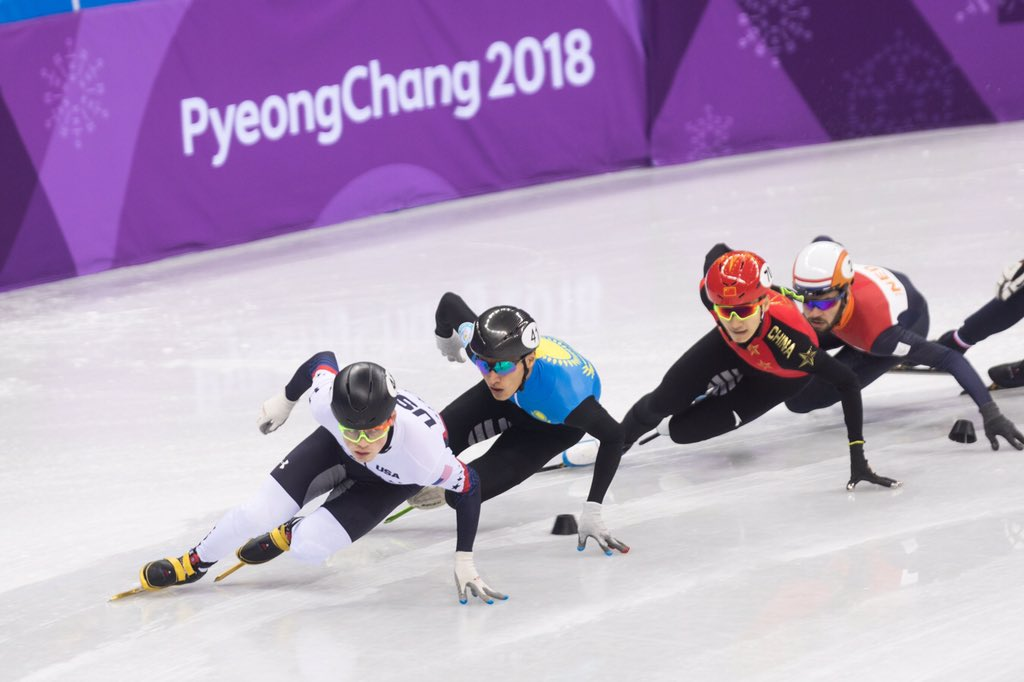

Personal information
- Nationality: Chinese
- Born: 26 September 1996 (age 29) Jiamusi, Heilongjiang, China
- Height: 1.75 m (5 ft 9 in)
- Weight: 65 kg (143 lb)

Sport
- Country: China
- Sport: Short track speed skating
- Event: 3000 m
- Club: People's Liberation Army
Medal record
Men's short-track speed skating
Representing China
Olympic Games
| Silver medal – second place | 2018 Pyeongchang | 5000 m relay |
World Championships
| Gold medal – first place | 2015 Moscow | 5000 m relay |
| Gold medal – first place | 2016 Seoul | 5000 m relay |
| Silver medal – second place | 2017 Rotterdam | 5000 m relay |
| Silver medal – second place | 2019 Sofia | 5000 m relay |
Asian Games
| Gold medal – first place | 2017 Sapporo | 5000 m relay |
Youth Olympic Games
| Bronze medal – third place | 2012 Innsbruck | 500 m |
| Bronze medal – third place | 2012 Innsbruck | 1000 m |
Representing Mixed-NOCs
Youth Olympic Games
| Silver medal – second place | 2012 Innsbruck | Mixed team relay |

Xu Hongzhi
- Simplified Chinese: 许宏志
- Traditional Chinese: 許宏志
Transcriptions
Standard Mandarin
- Hanyu Pinyin: Xǔ Hóngzhì
- IPA: [ɕỳ xʊ̌ŋ ʈʂɻ̩̂]

Xu Hongzhi (born 26 September 1996) is a Chinese short track speed skater. He competed in the 2018 Winter Olympics.
