= Mariya Dolgopolova =

Ukrainian speed skater (born 1997)

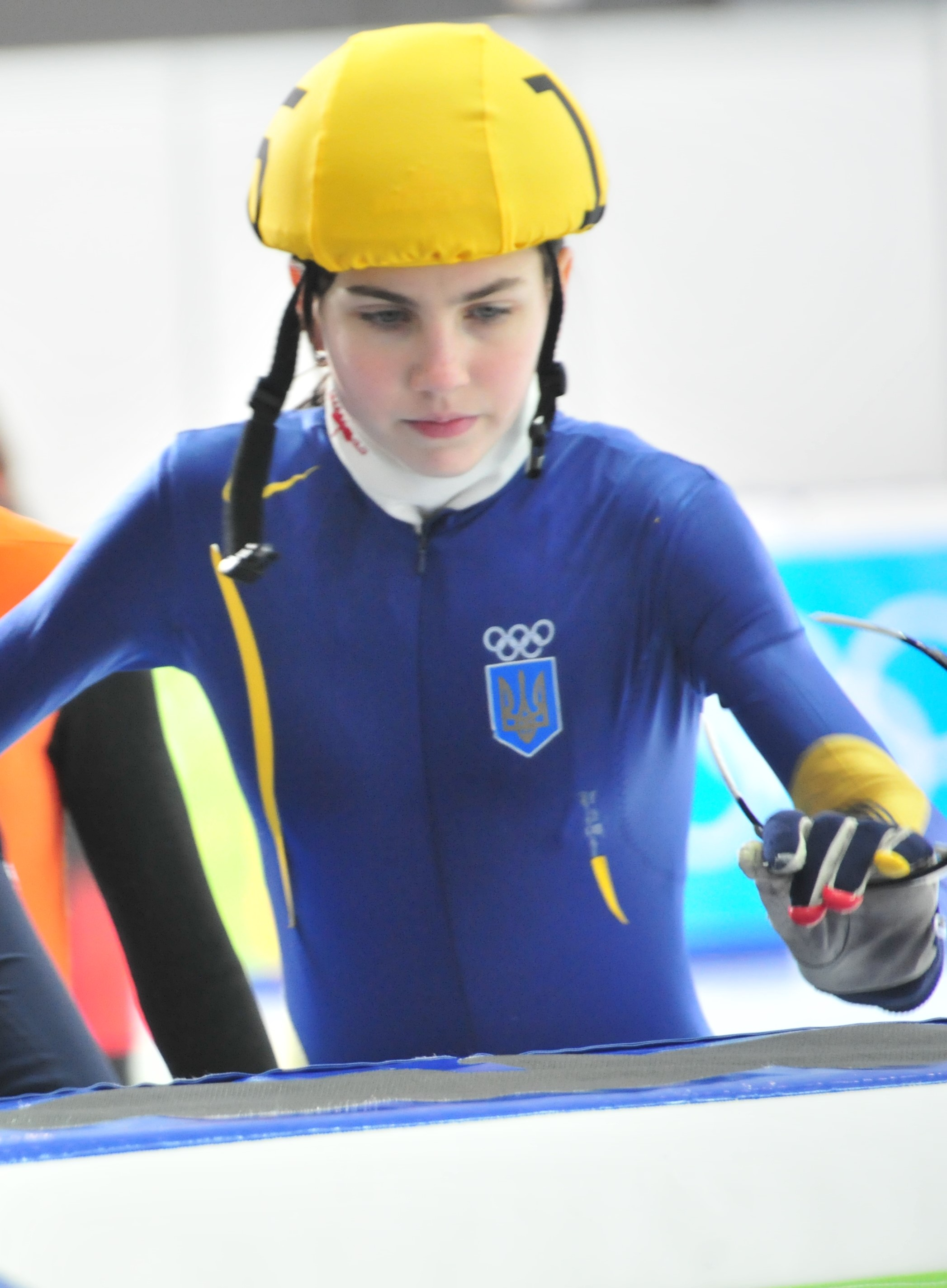
- Dolgopolova competing at the 2012 WYOG

Personal information
- Born: March 2, 1997 (age 29) Kharkiv, Ukraine

Sport
- Country: Ukraine
- Sport: Speed skating
Medal record
Women's short track speed skating
Representing Mixed-NOCs
Winter Youth Olympics
Silver medal – second place	2012 Innsbruck	Mixed team relay

Mariya Dolgopolova (born March 2, 1997 in Kharkiv) is a Ukrainian short track speed skater. She won silver at the 2012 Winter Youth Olympics. She represented Ukraine at the 2016, 2021, and 2022 World Championships as well as in multiple European championships, the most recent being in 2023.

She began training in 2009 in Kharkiv, Ukraine. A friend invited her to try the sport. She enjoys it because of its speed and close contact.

Dolgopolova competed at the 2012 Winter Youth Olympics for Ukraine. In the event, she was 7th in 500 m event, didn't finish in 1000 m and won silver in mixed team relay. Later she also competed at the 2013 European Youth Olympic Winter Festival in Brașov and 2015 Winter Universiade in Granada.

As of 2021, she worked in Kharkiv State Academy of Physical Culture.
