= Denis Ayrapetyan =

Russian speed skater (born 1997)

Personal information
- Full name: Denis Eduardovich Ayrapetyan
- Nationality: Russian
- Born: 17 January 1997 (age 29) Penza, Russia

Sport
- Country: Uzbekistan
- Sport: Short track speed skating
Medal record
Men's short-track speed skating
Representing Russia
European Championships
Gold medal – first place	2020 Debrecen	5000 m relay
Silver medal – second place	2017 Torino	5000 m relay
Silver medal – second place	2018 Dresden	5000 m relay
Silver medal – second place	2021 Gdańsk	1500 m
Bronze medal – third place	2019 Dordrecht	1000 m
Bronze medal – third place	2019 Dordrecht	5000 m relay
Bronze medal – third place	2021 Gdańsk	5000 m relay
Military World Games
Bronze medal – third place	2017 Sochi	500 m
World Junior Championships
Bronze medal – third place	2016 Sofia	3000 m relay
Representing Mixed-NOCs
Youth Olympic Games
Bronze medal – third place	2012 Innsbruck	Mixed team relay

Denis Eduardovich Ayrapetyan (Russian: Денис Эдуардович Айрапетян; born 17 January 1997) is a Russian short track speed skater representing Uzbekistan. He is a two-times European bronze medalist as part of the Russian relay team.
