= Alpine skiing at the 2012 Winter Youth Olympics =

Alpine Skiing at the I Winter Youth Olympic Games
- Venue: Olympia Run Patscherkofel; Igls, Innsbruck
- Dates: 14–22 January
- Competitors: 120 from 63 nations

Alpine Skiing at the 2012 Winter Youth Olympics was held at the Olympia Run Patscherkofel in Igls, Innsbruck, Austria from 14 to 22 January. The difference in the Youth Olympic program for alpine skiing compared to the Winter Olympics was that there were no downhill for both genders, and an inclusion of a team event.

== Medal summary ==
=== Medal table ===
* Host nation (Austria)

Rank	Nation	Gold	Silver	Bronze	Total
1	Austria*	3	0	2	5
2	France	2	2	1	5
3	Sweden	1	1	0	2
4	Switzerland	1	0	3	4
5	Morocco	1	0	0	1
5	Slovakia	1	0	0	1
7	Norway	0	2	0	2
8	Belgium	0	1	0	1
8	Canada	0	1	0	1
8	Italy	0	1	0	1
8	Slovenia	0	1	0	1
12	Andorra	0	0	1	1
12	Netherlands	0	0	1	1
12	Russia	0	0	1	1
Totals (14 entries)		9	9	9	27

=== Events ===
==== Boys' events ====
Event	Gold		Silver		Bronze	
Boys' super-G	Adam Lamhamedi; Morocco	1:04.45	Fredrik Bauer; Sweden	1:04.57	Joan Verdú Sánchez; Andorra	1:04.65
Boys' giant slalom	Marco Schwarz; Austria	1:51.70	Hannes Zingerle; Italy	1:52.10	Sandro Simonet; Switzerland	1:52.33
Boys' slalom	Sandro Simonet; Switzerland	1:18.36	Dries Van den Broecke; Belgium	1:20.26	Mathias Elmar Graf; Austria	1:20.35
Boys' combined	Marco Schwarz; Austria	1:40.45	Miha Hrobat; Slovenia	1:41.12	Sandro Simonet; Switzerland	1.41:45

==== Girls' events ====
Event	Gold		Silver		Bronze	
Girls' super-G	Estelle Alphand; France	1:05.78	Nora Grieg Christensen; Norway	1:05.79	Christina Ager; Austria	1:06.06
Girls' giant slalom	Clara Direz; France	1:56.13	Estelle Alphand; France	1:56.34	Jasmina Suter; Switzerland	1:56.45
Girls' slalom	Petra Vlhová; Slovakia	1:19.76	Roni Remme; Canada	1:21.25	Ekaterina Tkachenko; Russia	1:21.62
Girls' combined	Magdalena Fjällström; Sweden	1:40.82	Estelle Alphand; France	1:41.41	Adriana Jelinkova; Netherlands	1:42.21

==== Mixed events ====
Event	Gold	Silver	Bronze
Parallel mixed team	Austria; Martina Rettenwender; Marco Schwarz; Christina Ager; Mathias Elmar Graf	Norway; Nora Grieg Christensen; Martin Fjeldberg; Mina Fürst Holtmann; Marcus Monsen	France; Estelle Alphand; Victor Schuller; Clara Direz; Leny Herpin

=== Multi-medalists ===
Athletes who have won at least two medals.

Rank	Nation	Gold	Silver	Bronze	Total
1	Marco Schwarz (AUT)	3	0	0	3
2	Estelle Alphand (FRA)	1	2	1	4
3	Sandro Simonet (SUI)	1	0	2	3
4	Christina Ager (AUT)	1	0	1	2
4	Mathias Elmar Graf (AUT)	1	0	1	2
4	Clara Direz (FRA)	1	0	1	2
7	Nora Grieg Christensen (NOR)	0	2	0	2

== Qualification system ==
Each nation could send a maximum of 4 athletes (2 boys and 2 girls). The top 7 teams at the 2011 Junior Alpine World Ski Championships in Crans-Montana, Switzerland, plus the hosts Austria were allowed to send the maximum of 4 athletes. The remaining spots were awarded to nations who score points in the Marc Holder Trophy at the said championships. Any remaining quota spots were distributed to nations not already qualified, with a maximum of one boy or girl from one nation. The quota limit was 115, but with reallocation each gender gets one more spot. The updated quota spots were released on December 12, 2011 and are subject to change.

=== Qualification summary ===
NOC	Boys	Girls	Total
Andorra	1	1	2
Argentina	1	1	2
Australia	1	1	2
Austria	2	2	4
Belarus		1	1
Belgium	1		1
Bosnia and Herzegovina	1	1	2
Brazil	1	1	2
Bulgaria	1	1	2
Canada	2	2	4
Cayman Islands	1		1
Chile	1	1	2
Croatia	1	1	2
Cyprus	1		1
Czech Republic	1	1	2
Denmark	1	1	2
Eritrea	1		1
Estonia	1	1	2
Finland	1	1	2
France	2	2	4
Georgia	1	1	2
Germany	2	2	4
Great Britain	1	1	2
Greece	1	1	2
Hungary	1	1	2
Iceland	1	1	2
India		1	1
Iran	1	1	2
Ireland		1	1
Italy	2	2	4
Japan	1	1	2
Kazakhstan	1	1	2
Latvia	1	1	2
Lebanon	1	1	2
Liechtenstein	1		1
Lithuania	1	1	2
Luxembourg		1	1
Macedonia	1		1
Morocco	1		1
Monaco	1		1
Montenegro		1	1
Nepal	1		1
Netherlands	1	1	2
New Zealand	1	1	2
Norway	2	2	4
Peru		1	1
Philippines	1		1
Poland	1	1	2
Romania	1		1
Russia	1	1	2
San Marino	1		1
Serbia	1		1
Slovakia	1	1	2
Slovenia	2	2	4
South Africa	1		1
South Korea	1	1	2
Spain	1	1	2
Sweden	1	1	2
Switzerland	2	2	4
Chinese Taipei	1		1
Turkey	1	1	2
Ukraine	1	1	2
United States	1	1	2
Uzbekistan	1		1
Total athletes	66	56	122
Total NOCs	58	48	64
