= Alpine skiing at the 2012 Winter Youth Olympics – Boys' giant slalom =

Boys' giant slalom at the I Winter Youth Olympic Games
- Venue: Patscherkofel
- Date: January 19
- Competitors: 64 from 56 nations

Medalists
1st place, gold medalist(s)		Marco Schwarz	Austria
2nd place, silver medalist(s)		Hannes Zingerle	Italy
3rd place, bronze medalist(s)		Sandro Simonet	Switzerland

The boys' giant slalom competition of the alpine skiing events at the 2012 Winter Youth Olympics in Innsbruck, Austria, was held on January 19, at the Patscherkofel. 64 athletes from 56 different countries took part in this event.

== Results ==
Rank	Bib	Name	Country	Run 1	Run 2	Total	Difference
1st place, gold medalist(s)	3	Marco Schwarz	Austria	57.31	54.39	1:51.70	
2nd place, silver medalist(s)	11	Hannes Zingerle	Italy	57.54	54.56	1:52.10	+0.40
3rd place, bronze medalist(s)	12	Sandro Simonet	Switzerland	57.46	54.87	1:52.33	+0.63
4	4	Martin Fjeldberg	Norway	57.62	55.27	1:52.89	+1.19
5	5	Marcus Monsen	Norway	58.30	55.03	1:53.33	+1.63
6	20	Istok Rodeš	Croatia	57.82	56.64	1:54.46	+2.76
7	8	Seiya Hiroshima	Japan	59.09	55.67	1:54.76	+3.06
8	27	Nikolaus Ertl	Germany	1:00.43	54.70	1:55.13	+3.43
9	23	Tõnis Luik	Estonia	59.72	55.80	1:55.52	+3.82
10	19	Ian Gut	Switzerland	1:00.15	55.39	1:55.54	+3.84
11	30	Alex Leever	United States	59.89	56.09	1:55.98	+4.28
12	33	Artem Pak	Russia	1:00.50	55.59	1:56.09	+4.39
13	38	Miks Zvejnieks	Latvia	1:00.31	56.16	1:56.47	+4.77
14	36	Harry Izard-Price	New Zealand	1:00.76	56.31	1:57.07	+5.37
15	25	Andrzej Dziedzic	Poland	1:00.76	56.55	1:57.31	+5.61
16	34	Lambert Quezel	Canada	1:00.75	56.66	1:57.41	+5.71
17	9	Štefan Hadalin	Slovenia	59.27	58.21	1:57.48	+5.78
18	46	Manuel Hug	Liechtenstein	1:00.44	57.16	1:57.60	+5.90
19	37	Strahinja Stanišić	Serbia	1:01.85	57.15	1:59.00	+7.30
20	41	Nikoloz Kozanashvili	Georgia	1:01.77	57.98	1:59.75	+8.05
21	43	Márton Kékesi	Hungary	1:02.15	57.76	1:59.91	+8.21
22	42	Martin Štěpán	Czech Republic	1:01.25	59.02	2:00.27	+8.57
23	49	Mihai Andrei Centiu	Romania	1:02.69	58.39	2:01.08	+9.38
23	18	Dries Van den Broecke	Belgium	1:05.32	55.76	2:01.08	+9.38
25	22	Juho Sattanen	Finland	59.12	1:01.98	2:01.10	+9.40
26	45	Ruslan Sabitov	Kazakhstan	1:03.52	58.05	2:01.57	+9.87
27	47	Frederik Munck Bigom	Denmark	1:03.07	58.87	2:01.94	+10.24
28	52	Dmytro Mytsak	Ukraine	1:03.03	59.88	2:02.91	+11.21
29	51	Rokas Zaveckas	Lithuania	1:03.30	59.96	2:03.26	+11.56
30	57	Alexandre Mohbat	Lebanon	1:04.26	1:00.21	2:04.47	+12.77
31	48	Marjan Nashoku	Macedonia	1:03.84	1:01.46	2:05.30	+13.60
32	64	Tobias Macedo	Brazil	1:06.51	1:01.06	2:07.57	+15.87
33	54	Bryan Pelassy	Monaco	1:06.17	1:01.56	2:07.73	+16.03
34	56	Nima Baha	Iran	1:06.73	1:03.86	2:10.59	+18.89
35	60	Sive Speelman	South Africa	1:08.96	1:03.25	2:12.21	+20.51
36	59	Vincenzo Michelotti	San Marino	1:11.34	1:01.44	2:12.78	+21.08
37	58	Abel Tesfamariam	Philippines	1:10.20	1:04.13	2:14.33	+22.63
38	63	Wu Meng-che	Chinese Taipei	1:36.28	1:30.81	3:07.09	+1:15.39
39	62	Bibash Lama	Nepal	1:42.29	1:31.39	3:13.68	+1:21.98
	6	Miha Hrobat	Slovenia	56.95	DSQ		
	2	Victor Schuller	France	57.35	DNF		
	1	Sebastian Echeverría	Chile	58.13	DNF		
	24	Mathias Elmar Graf	Austria	58.34	DNF		
	28	Adria Bertran	Spain	59.94	DNF		
	31	Ramiro Fregonese	Argentina	1:00.48	DNF		
	35	Roman Murin	Slovakia	1:00.67	DNF		
	53	Dinos Lefkaritis	Cyprus	1:06.71	DNF		
	16	Massimiliano Valcareggi	Greece	1:14.65	DNF		
	7	Joan Verdú Sánchez	Andorra	DNF			
	10	Leny Herpin	France	DNF			
	13	Fredrik Bauer	Sweden	DNF			
	14	Adam Lamhamedi	Morocco	DNF			
	15	Lucas Krahnert	Germany	DNF			
	17	Davide Da Villa	Italy	DNF			
	21	Martin Grasic	Canada	DNF			
	26	Kim Dong-woo	South Korea	DNF			
	29	Jakob Helgi Bjarnason	Iceland	DNF			
	32	Harry Laidlaw	Australia	DNF			
	39	Georgi Nushev	Bulgaria	DNF			
	40	Marko Šljivić	Bosnia and Herzegovina	DNF			
	44	Paul Henderson	Great Britain	DNF			
	50	Shannon-Ogbnai Abeda	Eritrea	DNF			
	39	Arkadiy Semenchenko	Uzbekistan	DNF			
	61	Mustafa Topaloğlu	Turkey	DSQ			
