= Alpine skiing at the 2012 Winter Youth Olympics – Boys' combined =

Boys' combined at the I Winter Youth Olympic Games
- Venue: Patscherkofel
- Date: January 15
- Competitors: 54 from 46 nations
- Winning time: 1:40.45

Medalists
1st place, gold medalist(s)		Marco Schwarz	Austria
2nd place, silver medalist(s)		Miha Hrobat	Slovenia
3rd place, bronze medalist(s)		Sandro Simonet	Switzerland

The boys' combined competition of the alpine skiing events at the 2012 Winter Youth Olympics in Innsbruck, Austria, was held on January 15, at the Patscherkofel. 54 athletes from 46 countries took part in this event.

== Results ==
The race was started at 11:15.

Rank	Bib	Name	Country	Super-G	Rank	Slalom	Rank	Total	Difference
1st place, gold medalist(s)	11	Marco Schwarz	Austria	1:03.32	1	37.13	2	1:40.45	
2nd place, silver medalist(s)	23	Miha Hrobat	Slovenia	1:03.39	2	37.73	6	1:41.12	+0.67
3rd place, bronze medalist(s)	40	Sandro Simonet	Switzerland	1:04.33	9	37.12	1	1:41.45	+1.00
4	1	Marcus Monsen	Norway	1:04.19	8	38.02	8	1:42.21	+1.76
5	5	Leny Herpin	France	1:05.10	14	37.15	3	1:42.25	+1.80
6	18	Fredrik Bauer	Sweden	1:04.08	6	38.58	13	1:42.66	+2.21
7	13	Štefan Hadalin	Slovenia	1:04.64	11	38.03	9	1:42.67	+2.22
7	43	Mathias Elmar Graf	Austria	1:04.16	7	38.51	12	1:42.67	+2.22
9	41	Istok Rodeš	Croatia	1:05.51	19	37.70	5	1:43.21	+2.76
10	25	Alex Leever	United States	1:05.98	25	37.36	4	1:43.34	+2.89
11	33	Seiya Hiroshima	Japan	1:05.54	20	37.86	7	1:43.40	+2.95
12	10	Victor Schuller	France	1:04.65	12	39.00	16	1:43.65	+3.20
13	17	Martin Štěpán	Czech Republic	1:06.04	26	38.08	10	1:44.12	+3.67
14	4	Nikolaus Ertl	Germany	1:05.64	21	38.98	15	1:44.62	+4.17
15	6	Kim Dong-Woo	South Korea	1:06.38	28	38.31	11	1:44.69	+4.24
16	44	Ramiro Fregonese	Argentina	1:06.72	33	38.89	14	1:45.61	+5.16
17	47	Manuel Hug	Liechtenstein	1:06.52	29	39.27	17	1:45.79	+5.34
18	45	Lambert Quezel	Canada	1:05.96	24	40.23	21	1:46.19	+5.74
19	19	Georgi Nushev	Bulgaria	1:06.78	34	39.50	19	1:46.28	+5.83
20	8	Martin Grasic	Canada	1:06.88	35	39.49	18	1:46.37	+5.92
21	31	Sebastian Echeverria	Chile	1:06.61	31	40.12	20	1:46.73	+6.28
22	16	Harry Izard-Price	New Zealand	1:07.66	38	40.62	22	1:48.28	+7.83
23	12	Lucas Krahnert	Germany	1:03.96	4	45.85	29	1:49.81	+9.36
24	39	Márton Kékesi	Hungary	1:09.58	43	41.43	23	1:51.01	+10.56
25	35	Mihai Andrei Centiu	Romania	1:08.17	40	43.89	27	1:52.06	+11.61
26	22	Dmytro Mytsak	Ukraine	1:08.35	41	43.83	26	1:52.18	+11.73
27	48	Frederik Munck Bigom	Denmark	1:08.69	42	43.59	25	1:52.28	+11.83
28	49	Rokas Zaveckas	Lithuania	1:10.40	44	42.08	24	1:52.48	+12.03
29	52	Alexandre Mohbat	Lebanon	1:10.52	45	47.46	31	1:57.98	+17.53
30	50	Bryan Pelassy	Monaco	1:13.58	46	45.16	28	1:58.74	+18.29
31	51	Nima Baha	Iran	1:16.00	49	45.93	30	2:01.93	+21.48
32	54	Mustafa Topaloglu	Turkey	1:14.99	48	47.66	32	2:02.65	+22.20
33	53	Sive Speelman	South Africa	1:18.22	50	58.10	33	2:16.32	+35.87
	2	Roman Murin	Slovakia	1:05.37	16	DNF			
	3	Hannes Zingerle	Italy	1:03.97	5	DNF			
	9	Martin Fjeldberg	Norway	1:03.44	3	DNF			
	14	Davide de Villa	Italy	1:04.65	12	DNF			
	15	Artem Pak	Russia	1:06.56	30	DNF			
	20	Joan Verdú Sánchez	Andorra	1:04.58	10	DNF			
	21	Andrzej Dziedzic	Poland	1:05.69	22	DNF			
	26	Ian Gut	Switzerland	1:05.47	18	DNF			
	27	Massimiliano Valcareggi	Greece	1:05.42	17	DNF			
	28	Adria Bertran	Spain	1:06.88	35	DNF			
	29	Jakob Helgi Bjarnason	Iceland	1:05.34	15	DNF			
	30	Paul Henderson	Great Britain	1:05.89	23	DNF			
	32	Ruslan Sabitov	Kazakhstan	1:07.74	39	DNF			
	34	Juho Sattanen	Finland	1:06.08	27	DNF			
	37	Harry Laidlaw	Australia	1:06.69	32	DNF			
	38	Arkadiy Semenchenko	Uzbekistan	1:14.30	47	DNF			
	42	Tõnis Luik	Estonia	1:06.98	37	DSQ			
	7	Dries Van den Broecke	Belgium	DNF					
	24	Adam Lamhamedi	Morocco	DNF					
	36	Shannon-Ogbnai Abeda	Eritrea	DNF					
	46	Miks Zvejnieks	Latvia	DNF					
