= Freestyle skiing at the 2012 Winter Youth Olympics =

Freestyle skiing at the I Winter Youth Olympic Games
- Venue: Nordkette Innsbruck and Kuhtai; Igls, Innsbruck
- Dates: 17–22 January
- Competitors: 51 from 22 nations

Freestyle Skiing at the 2012 Winter Youth Olympics was held at the Nordkette Innsbruck and Kuhtai in Igls, Innsbruck, Austria from 17 January to 22 January. The difference in the Youth Olympic program for freestyle skiing compared to the Winter Olympics was that there were no aerials or moguls competition for both genders, and an inclusion of a ski half-pipe for both genders.

== Medal summary ==
=== Medal table ===
* Host nation (Austria)

Rank	Nation	Gold	Silver	Bronze	Total
1	Austria*	2	0	0	2
2	Finland	1	1	0	2
3	Switzerland	1	0	1	2
4	Czech Republic	0	1	0	1
4	Germany	0	1	0	1
4	Norway	0	1	0	1
7	Canada	0	0	1	1
7	France	0	0	1	1
7	United States	0	0	1	1
Totals (9 entries)		4	4	4	12

=== Events ===
Event	Gold		Silver		Bronze	
Boys' halfpipe	Kai Mahler; Switzerland	95.00	Lauri Kivari; Finland	90.00	Aaron Blunck; United States	87.50
Boys' ski cross	Niki Lehikoinen; Finland	56.15	Marzellus Renn; Germany	56.96	Matty Herauf; Canada	57.34
Girls' halfpipe	Elisabeth Gram; Austria	84.75	Tiril Sjastad Christiansen; Norway	79.25	Marine Tripier Mondancin; France	69.50
Girls' ski cross	Michaela Heider; Austria	58.38	Veronika Čamková; Czech Republic	58.63	Emilie Benz; Switzerland	58.82

== Qualification System ==
=== Qualification summary ===
NOC	Boys'		Girls'		Total
NOC	Ski cross	Half-pipe	Ski cross	Half-pipe	Total
Andorra		1			1
Argentina	1		1		2
Australia	1		1		2
Austria	1	1	1	1	4
Canada	1	1	1	1	4
Chile	1		1		2
Czech Republic	1		1		2
Finland	1	1		1	3
France	1	1	1	1	4
Germany	1	1	1		3
Great Britain		1		1	2
Italy	1				1
Japan	1			1	2
Kazakhstan	1				1
New Zealand	1	1		1	3
Norway	1	1		1	3
Russia	1		1		2
Slovenia				1	1
Sweden	1		1		2
Switzerland	1	1	1	1	4
United States	1	1	1	1	4
Total: 21 NOCs	17	13	12	11	53
