= Alpine skiing at the 2012 Winter Youth Olympics – Boys' super-G =

Boys' super-G at the I Winter Youth Olympic Games
- Venue: Patscherkofel
- Date: January 14
- Competitors: 55 from 47 nations
- Winning time: 1:04.45

Medalists
| 1st place, gold medalist(s) | | Adam Lamhamedi | Morocco |
| 2nd place, silver medalist(s) | | Fredrik Bauer | Sweden |
| 3rd place, bronze medalist(s) | | Joan Verdú Sánchez | Andorra |

The boys' super-G competition of the alpine skiing events at the 2012 Winter Youth Olympics in Innsbruck, Austria, was held on January 14, at Patscherkofel. 55 athletes from 47 different countries took part in this event.

== Results ==
The race was started at 12:30.

| Rank | Bib | Name | Country | Time | Difference |
|---|---|---|---|---|---|
| 1st place, gold medalist(s) | 13 | Adam Lamhamedi | Morocco | 1:04.45 | |
| 2nd place, silver medalist(s) | 14 | Fredrik Bauer | Sweden | 1:04.57 | +0.12 |
| 3rd place, bronze medalist(s) | 2 | Joan Verdú Sánchez | Andorra | 1:04.65 | +0.20 |
| 4 | 8 | Victor Schuller | France | 1:04.81 | +0.36 |
| 5 | 3 | Lucas Krahnert | Germany | 1:04.84 | +0.39 |
| 6 | 12 | Marcus Monsen | Norway | 1:04.97 | +0.52 |
| 7 | 19 | Davide Da Villa | Italy | 1:05.53 | +1.08 |
| 8 | 20 | Massimiliano Valcareggi | Greece | 1:05.55 | +1.10 |
| 9 | 9 | Hannes Zingerle | Italy | 1:05.57 | +1.12 |
| 10 | 44 | Mathias Elmar Graf | Austria | 1:05.62 | +1.17 |
| 11 | 41 | Sandro Simonet | Switzerland | 1:05.71 | +1.26 |
| 12 | 30 | Seiya Hiroshima | Japan | 1:06.00 | +1.55 |
| 13 | 18 | Ian Gut | Switzerland | 1:06.06 | +1.61 |
| 14 | 22 | Martin Štěpán | Czech Republic | 1:06.24 | +1.79 |
| 15 | 10 | Artem Pak | Russia | 1:06.27 | +1.82 |
| 16 | 17 | Alex Leever | United States | 1:06.33 | +1.88 |
| 17 | 26 | Paul Henderson | Great Britain | 1:06.97 | +2.52 |
| 18 | 27 | Roman Murin | Slovakia | 1:07.01 | +2.56 |
| 19 | 23 | Jakob Helgi Bjarnason | Iceland | 1:07.07 | +2.62 |
| 20 | 46 | Lambert Quezel | Canada | 1:07.40 | +2.95 |
| 21 | 28 | Sebastian Echeverría | Chile | 1:07.59 | +3.14 |
| 22 | 24 | Kim Dong-woo | South Korea | 1:07.65 | +3.20 |
| 23 | 35 | Andrzej Dziedzic | Poland | 1:07.98 | +3.53 |
| 24 | 21 | Adria Bertran | Spain | 1:08.21 | +3.76 |
| 25 | 45 | Ramiro Fregonese | Argentina | 1:08.48 | +4.03 |
| 26 | 31 | Juho Sattanen | Finland | 1:08.86 | +4.41 |
| 27 | 33 | Dmytro Mytsak | Ukraine | 1:08.89 | +4.44 |
| 28 | 43 | Tõnis Luik | Estonia | 1:09.00 | +4.55 |
| 29 | 34 | Georgi Nushev | Bulgaria | 1:09.11 | +4.66 |
| 30 | 32 | Mihai Andrei Centiu | Romania | 1:09.42 | +4.97 |
| 31 | 25 | Harry Izard-Price | New Zealand | 1:09.52 | +5.07 |
| 32 | 47 | Miks Zvejnieks | Latvia | 1:09.99 | +5.54 |
| 33 | 29 | Ruslan Sabitov | Kazakhstan | 1:10.32 | +5.87 |
| 34 | 40 | Márton Kékesi | Hungary | 1:11.70 | +7.25 |
| 35 | 50 | Rokas Zaveckas | Lithuania | 1:12.29 | +7.84 |
| 36 | 53 | Alexandre Mohbat | Lebanon | 1:14.42 | +9.97 |
| 37 | 55 | Mustafa Topaloğlu | Turkey | 1:15.64 | +11.19 |
| 38 | 51 | Bryan Pelassy | Monaco | 1:16.51 | +12.06 |
| 39 | 52 | Nima Baha | Iran | 1:17.43 | +12.98 |
| 40 | 38 | Arkadiy Semenchenko | Uzbekistan | 1:17.50 | +13.05 |
| 41 | 54 | Sive Speelman | South Africa | 1:18.31 | +13.86 |
| | 1 | Martin Grasic | Canada | DNF | |
| | 4 | Miha Hrobat | Slovenia | DNF | |
| | 5 | Leny Herpin | France | DNF | |
| | 6 | Martin Fjeldberg | Norway | DNF | |
| | 7 | Marco Schwarz | Austria | DNF | |
| | 11 | Štefan Hadalin | Slovenia | DNF | |
| | 16 | Dries Van den Broecke | Belgium | DNF | |
| | 36 | Shannon-Ogbnai Abeda | Eritrea | DNF | |
| | 42 | Istok Rodeš | Croatia | DNF | |
| | 48 | Manuel Hug | Liechtenstein | DNF | |
| | 49 | Frederik Munck Bigom | Denmark | DNF | |
| | 15 | Nikolaus Ertl | Germany | DSQ | |
| | 37 | Harry Laidlaw | Australia | DSQ | |
| | 39 | Marjan Nasoku | Macedonia | DSQ | |
