= Nordic combined at the 2012 Winter Youth Olympics =

Nordic combined at the I Winter Youth Olympic Games
- Venue: Seefeld Arena; Igls, Seefeld
- Dates: 14, 16 January
- Competitors: 17 from 17 nations

Nordic combined at the 2012 Youth Winter Olympics was held at the Olympic Ski Jump at the Seefeld Arena in Seefeld, Austria on 14 and 16 January. The program consisted of just one event, however there was a mixed relay with Ski jumping athletes.

== Medal summary ==
=== Medal table ===
Rank	Nation	Gold	Silver	Bronze	Total
1	Czech Republic	1	0	0	1
2	Finland	0	1	0	1
3	Japan	0	0	1	1
Totals (3 entries)		1	1	1	3

=== Event ===
Event	Gold		Silver		Bronze	
Individual	Tomas Portyk; Czech Republic	26:31.4	Ilkka Herola; Finland	26:34.2	Go Yamamoto; Japan	26:39.9

== Qualification ==
20 athletes will qualify. Austria as the host nation is guaranteed one place, as are the six nations who scored points in the Marc Holder Trophy at the 2011 FIS Nordic Junior Ski Championship. The 14 remaining places were to have been distributed to countries in finishing order at the individual 5 km event at the 2011 FIS Nordic Junior Ski Championship, however, four places were unused and will be given as universality places. The maximum quota is one athlete per nation.

After the final reallocation only 17 countries were available for spots.

Event	Date	Location	Vacancies	Qualified
Host Nation	-	-	1	Austria
Marc Holder Trophy at the 2011 FIS Nordic Junior Ski Championship	January 27–30, 2011	(Estonia) Otepää	4	Germany; Slovenia; Norway; Italy
2011 FIS Nordic Junior Ski Championship	January 27–30, 2011	(Estonia) Otepää	12	Estonia; Poland; Japan; Finland; United States; Russia; France; Switzerland; Czech Republic; Canada; Ukraine; Belarus
Universality Places	-	-	~~3~~	NOT USED
TOTAL			17	
