= Skeleton at the 2012 Winter Youth Olympics =

Skeleton at the I Winter Youth Olympic Games
- Venue: Olympic Sliding Centre Innsbruck; Igls
- Dates: 21 January
- Competitors: 28 from 15 nations

Skeleton at the 2012 Winter Youth Olympics was held at the Olympic Sliding Centre Innsbruck in Igls, Innsbruck, Austria on 21 January. The competition had a boys' and a girls' event.

== Qualification System ==
Each nation can send a maximum of 4 athletes (2 boys and 2 girls). The FIBT ranking will be used to allocate places to NOC's. Participation, for each of the men's and women's competitions, is limited to a total of 15 athletes, including the host nation. The NOC quotas are based on the updated FIBT ranking. Qualification is achieved by the results of athletes, who gain a qualification place for their NOC. Male and female athletes of non represented continents may also participate, with 1 male and 1 female athlete, provided that the maximum quota of 15 men and 15 women is not yet filled

== Medal summary ==
=== Medal table ===
* Host nation (Austria)

Rank	Nation	Gold	Silver	Bronze	Total
1	Germany	2	0	0	2
2	Austria*	0	2	0	2
3	Canada	0	0	2	2
Totals (3 entries)		2	2	2	6

=== Events ===
Event	Gold		Silver		Bronze	
Boys'	Sebastian Berneker; Germany	1:52.73	Stefan Geisler; Austria	1:54.70	Corey Gillies; Canada	1:55.82
Girls'	Jacqueline Lölling; Germany	57.43	Carina Mair; Austria	58.40	Carli Brockway; Canada	58.48

== Qualification system ==
Each nation could send a maximum of 4 athletes (2 boys and 2 girls). The FIBT ranking were used to allocate places to NOC's. Participation, for each of the men's and women's competitions, was limited to a total of 15 athletes, including the host nation. The NOC quotas were based on the updated FIBT ranking which was released by FIBT at a later time. Qualification was achieved by the results of athletes, who gained a qualification place for their NOC.

=== Boys' ===
The FIBT did not release a final list of qualified teams, this is just a list of teams in alphabetical order according to qualification system.

Event	Vacancies	Qualified
Europe/Africa	7	Germany; Italy; Latvia; Romania; Russia; Spain; Switzerland
Americas	~~4~~ 3	Canada; Mexico; United States
Asia/Oceania	3	Japan; Japan; South Korea
Host	1	Austria
TOTAL	14	

=== Girls' ===
The FIBT did not release a final list of qualified teams, this is just a list of teams in alphabetical order according to qualification system.

Event	Vacancies	Qualified
Europe/Africa	9	Germany; Germany; Italy; Netherlands; Romania; Romania; Russia; Russia; Slovenia
Americas	~~4~~ 3	Canada; United States; United States
Asia/Oceania	~~3~~ 1	Japan
Host	1	Austria
TOTAL	14	

=== Qualification summary ===
NOC	Boys'	Girls'	Total
Austria	1	1	2
Canada	1	1	2
Germany	1	2	3
Italy	1	1	2
Japan	2	1	3
Latvia	1		1
Mexico	1		1
Netherlands		1	1
Romania	1	2	3
Russia	1	2	3
Slovenia		1	1
Spain	1		1
Switzerland	1		1
South Korea	1		1
United States	1	2	3
Total athletes	14	14	28
Total NOCs	13	10	15
