= Skeleton at the Winter Youth Olympics =

- Governing body: IBSF
- Events: 2 (men: 1; women: 1; mixed: 0)

Games
- 2012; 2016; 2020; 2024

Skeleton was inducted at the Youth Olympic Games at the inaugural edition in 2012.

A total of two events are held, one event each for boys and girls, matching their Winter Olympics counterpart.

== Medalists summary ==
=== Men's ===
Events	Gold	Silver	Bronze
2012 Innsbruck	Sebastian Berneker; Germany	Stefan Richard Geisler; Austria	Corey Gillies; Canada
2016 Lillehammer	Evgenii Rukosuev; Russia	Alexander Hestengen; Norway	Robin Schneider; Germany
2020 Lausanne	Lukas Nydegger; Germany	Elvis Veinbergs; Latvia	Livio Summermatter; Switzerland
2024 Gangwon	Emīls Indriksons; Latvia	Yaroslav Lavreniuk; Ukraine	Shin Yeon-su; South Korea

=== Women's ===
Events	Gold	Silver	Bronze
2012 Innsbruck	Jacqueline Lölling; Germany	Carina Mair; Austria	Carli Brockway; Canada
2016 Lillehammer	Ashleigh Fay Pittaway; Great Britain	Hannah Neise; Germany	Agathe Bessard; France
2020 Lausanne	Anastasiia Tsyganova; Russia	Josefa Schellmoser; Germany	Sissi Schrödl; Germany
2024 Gangwon	Maria Votz; Germany	Dārta Neimane; Latvia	Laura Lēģere; Latvia

== Medal table ==
As of the 2024 Winter Youth Olympics.

Rank	Nation	Gold	Silver	Bronze	Total
1	Germany	4	2	2	8
2	Russia	2	0	0	2
3	Latvia	1	2	1	4
4	Great Britain	1	0	0	1
5	Austria	0	2	0	2
6	Norway	0	1	0	1
6	Ukraine	0	1	0	1
8	Canada	0	0	2	2
9	France	0	0	1	1
9	South Korea	0	0	1	1
9	Switzerland	0	0	1	1
Totals (11 entries)		8	8	8	24

== See also ==
- Skeleton at the Winter Olympics
