= Snowboarding at the 2012 Winter Youth Olympics – Girls' halfpipe =

Girls' halfpipe at the I Winter Youth Olympic Games
- Venue: Kühtai
- Date: 14–15 January
- Competitors: 16 from 13 nations
- Winning points: 96.25

Medalists
| 1st place, gold medalist(s) | | Hikaru Ōe | Japan |
| 2nd place, silver medalist(s) | | Arielle Gold | United States |
| 3rd place, bronze medalist(s) | | Lucile Lefevre | France |

The girls' halfpipe competition of the snowboarding events at the 2012 Winter Youth Olympics in Innsbruck, Austria, was held between January 14 and 15, at Kühtai. 16 athletes from 13 countries took part in this event.

== Results ==
=== Qualification ===
The qualification was started on 14 January at 11:30. The three best snowboarders qualified for the final (QF) and the six snowboarders qualified for the semifinal (QSF).

| Rank | Bib | Name | Country | Run 1 | Run 2 | Best | Notes |
|---|---|---|---|---|---|---|---|
| 1 | 6 | Arielle Gold | United States | 88.50 | 27.00 | 88.50 | QF |
| 2 | 1 | Hikaru Ōe | Japan | 82.00 | 78.00 | 82.00 | QF |
| 3 | 2 | Lucile Lefevre | France | 70.75 | 75.75 | 75.75 | QF |
| 4 | 8 | Alexandra Fitch | Australia | 61.25 | 67.00 | 67.00 | QSF |
| 5 | 16 | Quincy Korte-King | Canada | 57.00 | 59.00 | 59.00 | QSF |
| 6 | 11 | Maria Maiocco | Italy | 28.50 | 58.25 | 58.25 | QSF |
| 7 | 17 | Audrey McManiman | Canada | 51.50 | 37.00 | 51.50 | QSF |
| 8 | 12 | Indigo Monk | United States | 45.00 | 46.75 | 46.75 | QSF |
| 9 | 14 | Diana Augustinová | Czech Republic | 41.00 | 43.25 | 43.25 | QSF |
| 10 | 7 | Celia Petrig | Switzerland | 31.50 | 41.75 | 41.75 | |
| 11 | 4 | Sara Eguibar | Spain | 35.50 | 31.25 | 35.50 | |
| 12 | 10 | Emma Kanko | Finland | 16.00 | 26.00 | 26.00 | |
| 13 | 13 | Hanna Ehtonen | Finland | 18.75 | 21.75 | 21.75 | |
| 14 | 15 | Maeva Estevez | Andorra | 15.00 | 11.75 | 15.00 | |
| 15 | 3 | Johanna Sternat | Austria | 10.25 | DNS | 10.25 | |
| 16 | 5 | Paulina Berislavić | Croatia | 8.75 | 5.75 | 8.75 | |
| | 9 | Ekaterina Prusakova | Russia | Did not start | | | |

=== Semifinal ===
The semifinal was started on 15 January at 09:30. The three best snowboarderst qualified for the final (QF).

| Rank | Bib | Name | Country | Run 1 | Run 2 | Best | Notes |
|---|---|---|---|---|---|---|---|
| 1 | 8 | Alexandra Fitch | Australia | 82.00 | 87.50 | 87.50 | QF |
| 2 | 11 | Maria Maiocco | Italy | 74.25 | 83.75 | 83.75 | QF |
| 3 | 16 | Quincy Korte-King | Canada | 48.25 | 71.75 | 71.75 | QF |
| 4 | 17 | Audrey McManiman | Canada | 64.25 | 34.00 | 64.25 | |
| 5 | 12 | Indigo Monk | United States | 59.25 | 54.50 | 59.25 | |
| 6 | 14 | Diana Augustinová | Czech Republic | 47.75 | 43.75 | 47.75 | |

=== Final ===
The final was started on 15 January at 12:00.

| Rank | Bib | Name | Country | Run 1 | Run 2 | Best |
|---|---|---|---|---|---|---|
| 1st place, gold medalist(s) | 1 | Hikaru Ōe | Japan | 95.75 | 96.25 | 96.25 |
| 2nd place, silver medalist(s) | 6 | Arielle Gold | United States | 90.00 | 86.50 | 90.00 |
| 3rd place, bronze medalist(s) | 2 | Lucile Lefevre | France | 82.25 | 29.75 | 82.25 |
| 4 | 8 | Alexandra Fitch | Australia | 75.25 | 60.75 | 75.25 |
| 5 | 16 | Quincy Korte-King | Canada | 61.25 | 69.75 | 69.75 |
| 6 | 11 | Maria Maiocco | Italy | 69.00 | 44.25 | 69.00 |
