= Morocco at the 2012 Winter Youth Olympics =

- IOC code: MAR
- NOC: Moroccan Olympic Committee; Arabic: اللجنة الأولمبية الوطنية المغربية
- Website: www.marocolympique.org (in French)

in Innsbruck
- Competitors: 1 in 1 sport
- Flag bearer: Adam Lamhamedi
- Medals Ranked 19th: Gold 1 Silver 0 Bronze 0 Total 1

Winter Youth Olympics appearances (overview)
- 2012; 2016; 2020; 2024

Morocco competed at the 2012 Winter Youth Olympics in Innsbruck, Austria. The Moroccan team was made up of one athlete, a Canadian born alpine skier.

== Medalists ==
Medal	Name	Sport	Event	Date
Gold	Adam Lamhamedi	Alpine skiing	Boys' super-G	14 Jan

== Alpine skiing ==
Morocco has qualified one boy in alpine skiing.

Boy

Athlete	Event	Final			
Athlete	Event	Run 1	Run 2	Total	Rank
Adam Lamhamedi	Slalom	48.14	DNF		
Adam Lamhamedi	Giant slalom	DNF			
Adam Lamhamedi	Super-G			1:04.45	1st place, gold medalist(s)
Adam Lamhamedi	Combined	DNF			

== See also ==
- Morocco at the 2012 Summer Olympics
