= Freestyle skiing at the 2012 Winter Youth Olympics – Girls' ski cross =

Girls' ski cross at the I Winter Youth Olympic Games
- Venue: Kühtai
- Date: 19 January
- Competitors: 12 from 12 nations
- Winning time: 58.38

Medalists
1st place, gold medalist(s)		Michaela Heider	Austria
2nd place, silver medalist(s)		Veronika Čamková	Czech Republic
3rd place, bronze medalist(s)		Émilie Benz	Switzerland

The girls' ski cross event in freestyle skiing at the 2012 Winter Youth Olympics in Innsbruck, Austria, was held on 19 January at Kühtai. 12 athletes from 12 countries took part in this event. The final was canceled due to weather conditions. The final result was adopted based on the results of the qualification.

== Results ==
=== Qualification ===
The qualification was held on 19 January at 14:00.

Rank	Bib	Name	Country	Run 1	Notes
1st place, gold medalist(s)	12	Michaela Heider	Austria	58.38	
2nd place, silver medalist(s)	5	Veronika Čamková	Czech Republic	58.63	
3rd place, bronze medalist(s)	8	Émilie Benz	Switzerland	58.82	
4	7	India Sherret	Canada	1:00.21	
5	3	Claudia Leggett	Australia	1:00.30	
6	1	Katharina Tordi	Germany	1:00.82	
7	10	Manuela Roncallo	Argentina	1:01.67	
8	6	Ksenia Maksimova	Russia	1:01.82	
9	2	Emma Vorger	France	1:01.87	
10	9	Lesley Wilson	United States	1:02.64	
11	4	Elisa Guerrero	Chile	1:03.72	
12	11	Malou Peterson	Sweden	1:10.15	
