= Iran at the 2012 Winter Youth Olympics =

- IOC code: IRI
- NOC: National Olympic Committee of the Islamic Republic of Iran

in Innsbruck
- Competitors: 3 in 1 sport
- Flag bearer: Yaghoub Kiashemshaki
- Medals Ranked —th: Gold 0 Silver 0 Bronze 0 Total 0

Winter Youth Olympics appearances (overview)
- 2012; 2016; 2020; 2024

Iran competed at the 2012 Winter Youth Olympics in Innsbruck, Austria. Three athletes represented Iran in the 2012 Youth Olympics, two in alpine skiing and one in cross-country skiing. Yaghoub Kiashemshaki was the flagbearer for Iran in the opening ceremony.

== Competitors ==
Sport	Boys	Girls	Total
Skiing, Alpine	1	1	2
Skiing, Cross-country	1		1
Total	2	1	3

== Results by event ==
=== Skiing ===
==== Alpine ====
Boys

Athlete	Event	Run 1	Run 2	Total	Rank
Nima Baha	Slalom	49.04	48.76	1:37.80	30
Nima Baha	Giant slalom	1:06.73	1:03.86	2:10.59	34
Nima Baha	Super-G	1:17.43			39
Nima Baha	Super combined	1:16.00	45.93	2:01.93	31

Girls

Athlete	Event	Run 1	Run 2	Total	Rank
Hadis Ahmadi	Giant slalom	DNS	—	—	—
Hadis Ahmadi	Super-G	1:28.41			32
Hadis Ahmadi	Super combined	1:24.82	50.15	2:14.97	30

==== Cross-country ====
Boys

Athlete	Event	Qualification		Quarterfinal			Semifinal			Final		Rank
Athlete	Event	Time	Rank	Heat	Time	Rank	Heat	Time	Rank	Time	Rank	Rank
Yaghoub Kiashemshaki	Sprint free	2:10.72	49	Did not advance								49

Athlete	Event	Time	Rank
Yaghoub Kiashemshaki	10 km classical	37:14.4	41
