= Snowboarding at the 2012 Winter Youth Olympics – Girls' slopestyle =

Girls' slopestyle at the I Winter Youth Olympic Games
- Venue: Kühtai
- Date: 19 January
- Competitors: 13 from 10 nations
- Winning points: 84.25

Medalists
1st place, gold medalist(s)		Audrey McManiman	Canada
2nd place, silver medalist(s)		Arielle Gold	United States
3rd place, bronze medalist(s)		Alexandra Fitch	Australia

The girls' slopestyle competition of the snowboarding events at the 2012 Winter Youth Olympics in Innsbruck, Austria, was held January 19, at Kühtai. 28 athletes from 18 countries took part in this event.

== Results ==
=== Qualification ===
The qualification was started on 19 January at 11:00. The nine best snowboarders qualified for the final.

Rank	Bib	Name	Country	Run 1	Run 2	Best	Notes
1	11	Audrey McManiman	Canada	83.00	30.00	83.00	QF
2	13	Celia Petrig	Switzerland	79.50	32.75	79.50	QF
3	3	Alexandra Fitch	Australia	59.25	77.75	77.75	QF
4	12	Arielle Gold	United States	77.50	72.50	77.50	QF
5	4	Indigo Monk	United States	65.75	77.25	77.25	QF
6	8	Quincy Korte-King	Canada	75.75	66.00	75.75	QF
7	15	Maria Maiocco	Italy	55.25	74.75	74.75	QF
8	2	Lucile Lefevre	France	36.75	69.25	69.25	QF
9	5	Birgit Rofner	Austria	59.75	52.75	59.75	QF
10	9	Emma Kanko	Finland	55.00	27.75	55.00	
11	1	Johanna Sternat	Austria	53.50	51.50	53.50	
12	14	Diana Augustinová	Czech Republic	48.50	47.00	48.50	
13	7	Paulina Berislavić	Croatia	10.25	19.50	19.50	
	6	Maeva Estevez	Andorra	Did not start			
	10	Hanna Ehtonen	Finland	Did not start			

=== Final ===
The final was started on 19 January at 12:30.

Rank	Bib	Name	Country	Run 1	Run 2	Best
1st place, gold medalist(s)	11	Audrey McManiman	Canada	84.25	62.75	84.25
2nd place, silver medalist(s)	12	Arielle Gold	United States	71.75	69.00	71.75
3rd place, bronze medalist(s)	3	Alexandra Fitch	Australia	69.75	42.50	69.75
4	13	Celia Petrig	Switzerland	62.00	40.75	62.00
5	4	Indigo Monk	United States	55.00	50.00	55.00
6	15	Maria Maiocco	Italy	47.25	54.25	54.25
7	8	Quincy Korte-King	Canada	49.00	51.50	51.50
8	5	Birgit Rofner	Austria	33.50	49.50	49.50
9	2	Lucile Lefevre	France	36.25	42.25	42.25
