= Freestyle skiing at the 2012 Winter Youth Olympics – Boys' ski cross =

Boys' ski cross at the I Winter Youth Olympic Games
- Venue: Kühtai
- Dates: 19 January
- Competitors: 18 from 17 nations
- Winning time: 56.15

Medalists
1st place, gold medalist(s)		Niki Lehikoinen	Finland
2nd place, silver medalist(s)		Marzellus Renn	Germany
3rd place, bronze medalist(s)		Matty Herauf	Canada

The boys' ski cross event in freestyle skiing at the 2012 Winter Youth Olympics in Innsbruck, Austria, was held on 19 January at Kühtai. 18 athletes from 17 different countries took part in this event. The final was canceled due to weather conditions. The final result was adopted based on the results of the qualification

== Results ==
=== Qualification ===
The qualification was held on 19 January at 14:00.

Rank	Bib	Name	Country	Run 1	Notes
1st place, gold medalist(s)	8	Niki Lehikoinen	Finland	56.15	
2nd place, silver medalist(s)	14	Marzellus Renn	Germany	56.96	
3rd place, bronze medalist(s)	4	Matty Herauf	Canada	57.34	
4	9	Harry Laidlaw	Australia	57.43	
5	16	Marius Bø Vangsnes	Norway	57.73	
6	1	Michael Schatz	Austria	57.76	
7	11	Maxim Vlasenko	Russia	57.88	
8	15	Patrick Renner	Italy	58.36	
9	2	Axel Frost	Sweden	58.59	
10	3	Thomas Rivara	Argentina	59.00	
11	7	Bastien Girard	France	59.27	
12	6	Vincent Gentet	Switzerland	59.45	
13	10	Juan Pablo Casas	Chile	59.46	
14	5	Jack Millar	Australia	59.46	
15	18	Václav Klemš	Czech Republic	59.61	
16	13	Yuki Nakagawa	Japan	1:00.27	
17	12	Alon Mullayev	Kazakhstan	1:00.82	
18	17	Sam Andrews	New Zealand	1:02.74	
