= Skeleton at the 2012 Winter Youth Olympics – Boys' =

Boys at the I Winter Youth Olympic Games
- Venue: Olympic Sliding Centre Innsbruck
- Date: January 21
- Competitors: 14 from 13 nations
- Winning time: 1:52.73

Medalists
1st place, gold medalist(s)		Sebastian Berneker	Germany
2nd place, silver medalist(s)		Stefan Geisler	Austria
3rd place, bronze medalist(s)		Corey Gillies	Canada

The boys competition of the skeleton events at the 2012 Winter Youth Olympics in Innsbruck, Austria, was held on January 21, at the Olympic Sliding Centre Innsbruck. 14 athletes from 13 countries took part in this event.

== Results ==
Rank	Bib	Athletes	Country	Run 1	Run 2	Total	Behind
1st place, gold medalist(s)	4	Sebastian Berneker	Germany	56.20	56.53	1:52.73	–
2nd place, silver medalist(s)	6	Stefan Geisler	Austria	57.11	57.59	1:54.70	+1.97
3rd place, bronze medalist(s)	12	Corey Gillies	Canada	58.35	57.47	1:55.82	+3.09
4	1	Cosmin Chioibaşu	Romania	57.97	57.89	1:55.86	+3.13
5	13	Sacha Berger	Switzerland	59.02	58.66	1:57.68	+4.95
6	9	Valeriy Myshaev	Russia	58.26	59.45	1:57.71	+4.98
7	3	Anthony Herringshaw	United States	59.00	59.16	1:58.16	+5.43
8	11	Dāvis Dreimanis	Latvia	59.22	59.24	1:58.46	+5.73
9	14	Dan Sato	Japan	59.55	59.34	1:58.89	+6.16
10	7	Hiroki Nokura	Japan	59.92	59.80	1:59.72	+6.99
11	5	Ferdinando Mulassano	Italy	59.86	59.94	1:59.80	+7.07
12	8	Kim Ban-seok	South Korea	1:01.34	59.08	2:00.42	+7.69
13	2	Marc Alcaraz	Spain	1:00.98	1:01.40	2:02.38	+9.65
14	10	Josué Montiel	Mexico	1:01.85	1:02.52	2:04.37	+11.64
