= Ilya Nekolenko =

Russian ice hockey player

- Born: July 31, 1993 (age 32) Moscow, Russia
- Height: 6 ft 5 in (196 cm)
- Weight: 220 lb (100 kg; 15 st 10 lb)
- Position: Defence
- Shot: Left
- Played for: Atlant Moscow Oblast; HC Spartak Moscow; Severstal Cherepovets; Metallurg Novokuznetsk; HC Sibir Novosibirsk; HC Ugra; HC Neftekhimik Nizhnekamsk; Reading Royals; Newfoundland Growlers; KRS-BSU; Dizel Penza
- NHL draft: Undrafted
- Playing career: 2013–2020

Ilya Nekolenko (born July 31, 1993) is a Russian former professional ice hockey defenceman. He most notably played in the Kontinental Hockey League (KHL).

== Playing career ==
Nekolenko made his Kontinental Hockey League debut playing with Atlant Moscow Oblast during the 2012–13 KHL season. In 2013, Nekolenko was traded to HC Spartak Moscow and split the season between the KHL and MHL, winning the MHL Championship. He was then moved to Severstal Cherepovets before signing a one-year contract with Croatian-based entrant club, KHL Medveščak Zagreb on June 17, 2015. He was later released from his contract without featuring with Zagreb to sign a new one-year contract with Metallurg Novokuznetsk on July 31, 2015. In 2016, Nekolenko was called up to the Russian National Team and signed a two-year deal with Sibir Novosibirsk. Nekolenko's time in Siberia was marred by a five-game suspension for throwing a puck at a referee. Before the start of the 2017 season, Nekolenko was traded to HC Yugra in exchange for Alexander Makarov. Just 3 months later, Nekolenko's contract was terminated as he fell out of favour with the new coach. He was picked up by Neftekhimik Nizhnekamsk, where he appeared in one playoff game.

After six seasons in his native country Russia in the KHL, Nekolenko opted to pursue a North American career, signing a one-year contract for the 2018–19 season with the Reading Royals in the ECHL on September 4, 2018. After making 3 appearances with the Royals for 1 assist, Nekolenko was placed on waivers and claimed by the Newfoundland Growlers on November 12, 2018. Nekolenko played 18 games with the Growlers, but was scratched for the entirety of their playoff run on their way to winning the Kelly Cup.

Nekolenko, alongside Growlers teammate Semyon Babintsev, were inaugural members of ORG Beijing. Nekolenko later left the club for Dizel Penza, where he finished the season.

== Personal ==
His younger brother, Arkhip (born March 11, 1996), was drafted in the first round, 20th overall, by Spartak Moscow in the 2013 KHL Junior Draft.
