= Mexico at the 2012 Winter Youth Olympics =

- IOC code: MEX
- NOC: Comité Olímpico Mexicano

in Innsbruck
- Competitors: 1 in 1 sport
- Flag bearer: Joshua Montiel Santander
- Medals: Gold 0 Silver 0 Bronze 0 Total 0

Winter Youth Olympics appearances (overview)
- 2012; 2016; 2020; 2024

Mexico competed at the 2012 Winter Youth Olympics in Innsbruck, Austria. The Mexican team was made up of one skeleton athlete and two officials. The chef de mission of the team was Carlos Pruneda.

== Skeleton ==
Mexico qualified one boy in skeleton. Santander was born in the state of Utah.

Boy

Athlete	Event	Final			
Athlete	Event	Run 1	Run 2	Total	Rank
Joshua Montiel Santander	Boys' individual	1:01.85	1:02.52	2:04.37	14

== See also ==
- Mexico at the 2012 Summer Olympics
