= Serbia at the 2012 Winter Youth Olympics =

- IOC code: SRB
- NOC: Olympic Committee of Serbia
- Website: www.oks.org.rs

in Innsbruck
- Competitors: 2 in 2 sports
- Flag bearer: Dženis Avdić
- Medals: Gold 0 Silver 0 Bronze 0 Total 0

Winter Youth Olympics appearances
- 2012; 2016; 2020; 2024

Serbia competed at the 2012 Winter Youth Olympics in Innsbruck, Austria. The Serbian team was made up of two athletes competing in two different sports. It did not win any medals.

== Alpine skiing ==
Serbia qualified one boy in alpine skiing.

Boy

Athlete	Event	Final			
Athlete	Event	Run 1	Run 2	Total	Rank
Strahinja Stanišić	Slalom	DSQ			
Strahinja Stanišić	Giant slalom	1:01.85	57.15	1:59.00	19

== Biathlon ==
Serbia qualified one boy.

Boy

Athlete	Event	Final		
Athlete	Event	Time	Misses	Rank
Dženis Avdić	Sprint	24:18.5	7	47
Dženis Avdić	Pursuit	38:37.7	9	45

== See also ==
- Serbia at the 2012 Summer Olympics
