= Eritrea at the 2012 Winter Youth Olympics =

- IOC code: ERI
- NOC: Eritrean National Olympic Committee

in Innsbruck
- Competitors: 1 in 1 sport
- Flag bearer: Shannon Abeda
- Medals: Gold 0 Silver 0 Bronze 0 Total 0

Winter Youth Olympics appearances
- 2012; 2016–2024

Eritrea competed at the 2012 Winter Youth Olympics in Innsbruck, Austria. The Eritrean team was made up of one athlete, a Canadian born alpine skier. This marked Eritrea's debut at a Winter Olympics.

== Alpine skiing ==
Eritrea qualified one boy in alpine skiing.

Boy

Athlete	Event	Final			
Athlete	Event	Run 1	Run 2	Total	Rank
Shannon Abeda	Slalom	46.14	DNF		
Shannon Abeda	Giant slalom	DNF			
Shannon Abeda	Super-G			DNF	
Shannon Abeda	Combined	DNF			

== See also ==
- Eritrea at the 2012 Summer Olympics
