= Czech Republic at the 2012 Winter Youth Olympics =

- IOC code: CZE
- NOC: Czech Olympic Committee
- Website: www.olympic.cz

in Innsbruck
- Competitors: 24 in 11 sports
- Flag bearer: Petr Knop
- Medals Ranked 18th: Gold 1 Silver 1 Bronze 0 Total 2

Winter Youth Olympics appearances (overview)
- 2012; 2016; 2020; 2024

The Czech Republic competed at the 2012 Winter Youth Olympics in Innsbruck, Austria. The Czech team consisted of 24 athletes competing in 11 different sports.

== Medalists ==
Medal	Name	Sport	Event	Date
Gold	Tomas Portyk	Nordic combined	Individual	15 Jan
Silver	Veronika Camkova	Freestyle Skiing	Girls' ski cross	21 Jan

== Alpine skiing ==
Boys

Athlete	Event	Final			
Athlete	Event	Run 1	Run 2	Total	Rank
Martin Stepan	Slalom	44.12	40.86	1:224.98	19
Martin Stepan	Giant slalom	1:01.25	59.02	2:00.27	22
Martin Stepan	Super-G			1:06.24	14
Martin Stepan	Combined	1:06.04	38.08	1:44.12	13

Girls

Athlete	Event	Final			
Athlete	Event	Run 1	Run 2	Total	Rank
Dominika Drozdikova	Slalom	45.79	40.59	1:26.38	10
Dominika Drozdikova	Giant slalom	59.97	1:00.84	2:00.81	16
Dominika Drozdikova	Super-G			1:08.47	18
Dominika Drozdikova	Combined	1:08.30	DNF		

== Biathlon ==
The Czech Republic has qualified a full biathlon team of 2 boys and 2 girls.

Boys

Athlete	Event	Final		
Athlete	Event	Time	Misses	Rank
Ondrej Hosek	Sprint	21:55.5	3	23
Ondrej Hosek	Pursuit	33:09.6	7	22
Adam Václavík	Sprint	20:32.5	1	8
Adam Václavík	Pursuit	31:07.2	8	12

Girls

Athlete	Event	Final		
Athlete	Event	Time	Misses	Rank
Erika Jislova	Sprint	19:18.4	1	16
Erika Jislova	Pursuit	34:04.7	7	28
Jessica Jislová	Sprint	18:19.5	0	6
Jessica Jislová	Pursuit	29:10.2	2	7

Mixed

Athlete	Event	Final		
Athlete	Event	Time	Misses	Rank
Erika Jislova; Jessica Jislová; Adam Václavík; Ondrej Hosek	Mixed relay	1:17:11.5	1+15	7
Jessica Jislová; Petra Hyncicova; Adam Václavík; Petr Knop	Cross-Country-Biathlon Mixed Relay	1:07:34.5	3+8	12

== Cross country skiing ==
The Czech Republic has qualified a team of 1 boy and 1 girl.

Boy

Athlete	Event	Final	
Athlete	Event	Time	Rank
Petr Knop	10km classical	30:44.8	9

Girl

Athlete	Event	Final	
Athlete	Event	Time	Rank
Petra Hyncicova	5km classical	17:38.6	30

Sprint

Athlete	Event	Qualification		Quarterfinal		Semifinal		Final	
Athlete	Event	Total	Rank	Total	Rank	Total	Rank	Total	Rank
Petr Knop	Boys' sprint	1:50.18	29 Q	1:50.6	3	did not advance			
Petra Hyncicova	Girls' sprint	2:02.58	17 Q	2:01.9	1 Q	2:01.2	5	did not advance	

Mixed

Athlete	Event	Final		
Athlete	Event	Time	Misses	Rank
Jessica Jislová; Petra Hynčicová; Adam Václavík; Petr Knop	Cross-Country-Biathlon Mixed Relay	1:07:34.5	3+8	12

== Curling ==
The Czech Republic has qualified a mixed team.

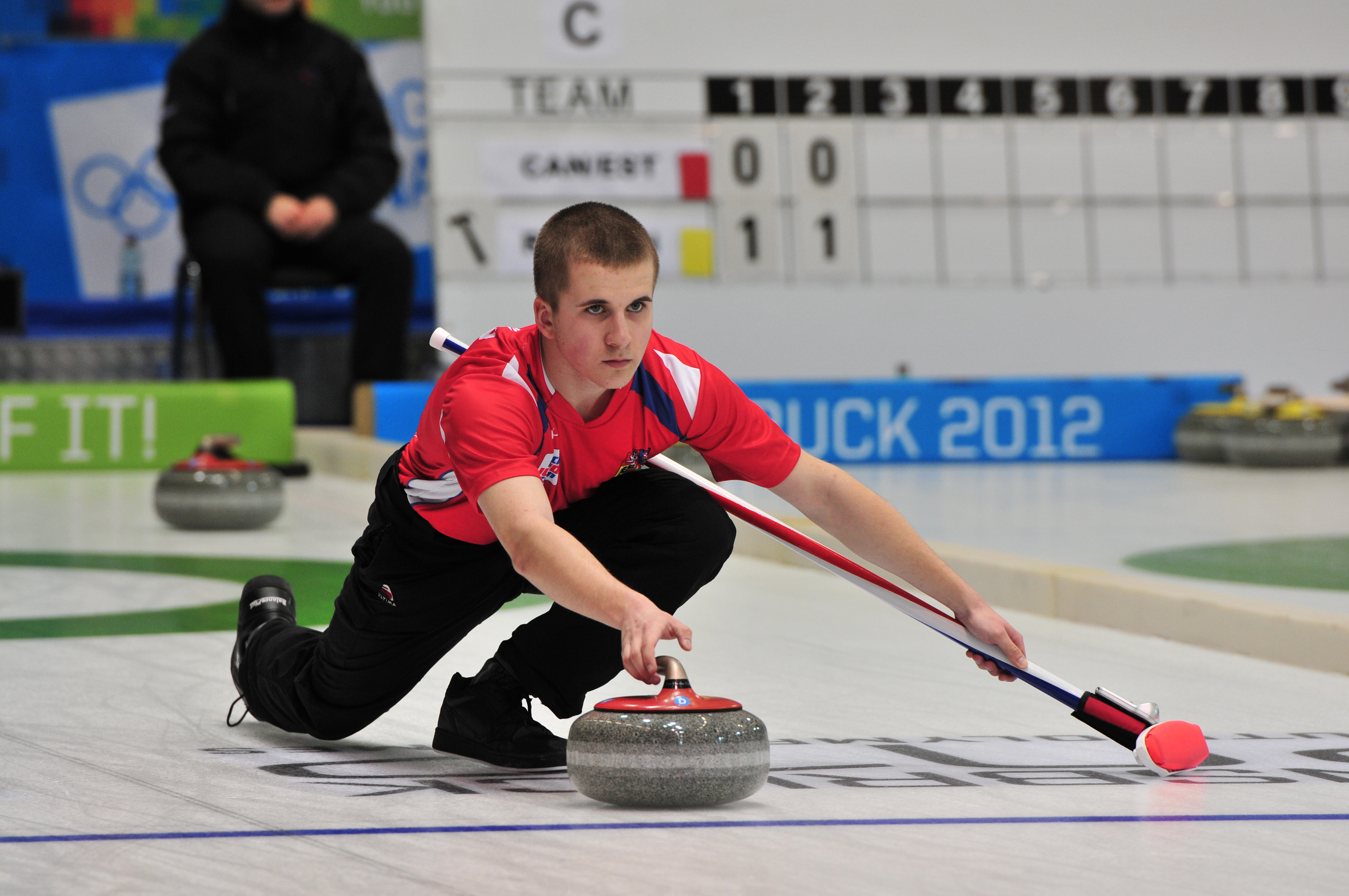
Marek Černovský

Mixed team

- Skip: Marek Černovský
- Third: Alžběta Baudyšová
- Second: Krystof Krupanský
- Lead: Zuzana Hrůzová

=== Mixed Team ===
Final Round Robin Standings

Blue Group	Skip	W	L
United States	Korey Dropkin	7	0
Switzerland	Michael Brunner	6	1
Czech Republic	Marek Černovský	4	3
China	Bai Yang	3	4
Norway	Markus Skogvold	3	4
South Korea	Kang Sue-yeon	2	5
New Zealand	Luke Steele	2	5
Estonia	Robert-Kent Päll	1	6

==== Round Robin Results ====
Draw 1

Sheet A	1	2	3	4	5	6	7	8	Final
South Korea (Kang)	0	0	2	1	0	0	0	X	3
Czech Republic (Černovský)	1	0	0	0	2	0	3	X	6

Draw 2

Sheet D	1	2	3	4	5	6	7	8	Final
Czech Republic (Černovský)	0	2	0	2	0	3	2	X	9
Estonia (Päll)	2	0	1	0	1	0	0	X	4

Draw 3

Sheet B	1	2	3	4	5	6	7	8	Final
Norway (Skogvold)	3	0	1	0	0	0	1	0	5
Czech Republic (Černovský)	0	2	0	0	1	2	0	3	8

Draw 4

Sheet C	1	2	3	4	5	6	7	8	Final
Czech Republic (Černovský)	0	1	0	0	3	0	1	0	5
China (Bai)	1	0	2	0	0	2	0	1	6

Draw 5

Sheet B	1	2	3	4	5	6	7	8	Final
Czech Republic (Černovský)	0	0	0	0	1	0	X	X	1
United States (Dropkin)	2	4	2	2	0	1	X	X	11

Draw 6

Sheet A	1	2	3	4	5	6	7	8	Final
Czech Republic (Černovský)	0	2	2	0	3	0	2	X	9
New Zealand (Steele)	1	0	0	2	0	1	0	X	4

Draw 7

Sheet D	1	2	3	4	5	6	7	8	Final
Switzerland (Brunner)	0	1	4	0	2	0	1	X	8
Czech Republic (Černovský)	0	0	0	1	0	3	0	X	4

==== Quarterfinals ====
Sheet A	1	2	3	4	5	6	7	8	Final
Canada (Scoffin)	2	0	1	0	0	2	1	0	7
Czech Republic (Černovský)	0	2	0	3	2	0	0	0	6

=== Mixed doubles ===
==== Round of 32 ====
Sheet D	1	2	3	4	5	6	7	8	Final
Mikhail Vaskov (RUS); Zuzana Hrůzová (CZE)	0	5	1	1	1	1	1	X	10
Marie Turmann (EST); Alessandro Zoppi (ITA)	3	0	0	0	0	0	0	X	3

Sheet D	1	2	3	4	5	6	7	8	Final
Kang Sue-yeon (KOR); Krystof Krupanský (CZE)	3	1	0	3	0	2	1	X	10
Daniel Rothballer (GER); Arianna Losano (ITA)	0	0	2	0	3	0	0	X	5

Sheet D	1	2	3	4	5	6	7	8	Final
Marek Černovský (CZE); Rachel Hannen (GBR)	0	2	1	2	0	0	2	1	8
Denise Pimpini (ITA); David Weyer (NZL)	2	0	0	0	2	1	0	0	5

Sheet D	1	2	3	4	5	6	7	8	Final
Alžběta Baudyšová (CZE); Bai Yang (CHN)	0	0	0	5	1	0	3	0	9
Amos Mosaner (ITA); Irena Brettbacher (AUT)	1	1	1	0	0	4	0	3	10

==== Round of 16 ====
Sheet A	1	2	3	4	5	6	7	8	Final
Corryn Brown (CAN); Martin Reichel (AUT)	1	1	1	2	0	1	1	0	7
Kang Sue-yeon (KOR); Krystof Krupanský (CZE)	0	0	0	0	2	0	0	2	4

Sheet B	1	2	3	4	5	6	7	8	Final
Anastasia Moskaleva (RUS); Tsukasa Horigome (JPN)	1	0	2	2	1	1	X	X	7
Marek Černovský (CZE); Rachel Hannen (GBR)	0	1	0	0	0	0	X	X	1

Sheet A	1	2	3	4	5	6	7	8	Final
Thomas Scoffin (CAN); Kelsi Heath (NZL)	0	1	0	1	1	0	2	0	5
Mikhail Vaskov (RUS); Zuzana Hrůzová (CZE)	2	0	1	0	0	1	0	2	6

==== Quarterfinals ====
Sheet B	1	2	3	4	5	6	7	8	Final
Michael Brunner (SUI); Nicole Muskatewitz (GER)	0	0	1	2	1	0	3	1	8
Mikhail Vaskov (RUS); Zuzana Hrůzová (CZE)	1	1	0	0	0	1	0	0	3

== Figure skating ==
The Czech Republic has qualified an ice dance pair

Athlete	Event	SP/OD		FS/FD		Total	Rank
Athlete	Event	Points	Rank	Points	Rank	Total	Rank
Alexander Sinicyn; Jana Cejkova	Ice dancing	37.38	8	55.34	7	92.72	7

Mixed

Athletes	Event	Boys'			Girls'			Ice Dance			Total	
Athletes	Event	Score	Rank	Points	Score	Rank	Points	Score	Rank	Points	Points	Rank
Team 3 Carlo Vittorio Palermo (ITA); Anais Ventard (FRA); Jana Cejkova/Alexandr Sinicyn (CZE)	Team Trophy	75.71	7	2	76.09	4	5	54.72	5	4	11	8

== Freestyle skiing ==
The Czech Republic has qualified a full team of 1 boy and 1 girl.

Ski Cross

Athlete	Event	Qualifying		1/4 finals	Semifinals	Final
Athlete	Event	Time	Rank	Rank	Rank	Rank
Vaclav Klems	Boys' ski cross	59.61	15	Cancelled		
Veronika Camkova	Girls' ski cross	58.63	2nd place, silver medalist(s)	Cancelled		

== Luge ==
The Czech Republic has qualified one girl

Girl

Athlete	Event	Run 1	Run 2	Total	Rank
Vendula Kotenova	Girls' singles	40.809	40.857	1:21.666	10

== Nordic combined ==
The Czech Republic has qualified one athlete in Nordic combined.

Boy

Athlete	Event	Ski jumping		Cross-country		Final	
Athlete	Event	Points	Rank	Deficit	Ski Time	Total Time	Rank
Tomas Portyk	Boys' individual	129.8	5	0:31	26:00.4	26:31.4	1st place, gold medalist(s)

== Short track speed skating ==
The Czech Republic has qualified one boy.

Boy

Athlete	Event	Quarterfinals		Semifinals		Finals	
Athlete	Event	Time	Rank	Time	Rank	Time	Rank
Michal Prokop	Boys' 500 metres	1:03.050	4 qCD	48.148	3 qD	-	1
Michal Prokop	Boys' 1000 metres	1:36.489	3 qCD	1:38.044	3 qD	1:36.324	2

Mixed

Athlete	Event	Semifinals		Finals	
Athlete	Event	Time	Rank	Time	Rank
Team H Anna Gamorina (RUS); Hyo Jun Lim (KOR); Aafke Soet (NED); Michal Prokop (CZE)	Mixed Team Relay	4:26.027	2 Q	PEN	

== Ski jumping ==
The Czech Republic has qualified one boy and girl in ski jumping.

Boy

Athlete	Event	1st Jump		2nd Jump		Overall	
Athlete	Event	Distance	Points	Distance	Points	Points	Rank
Tomas Friedrich	Boys' individual	74.0m	127.9	70.5m	118.5	246.4	6

Girl

Athlete	Event	1st Jump		2nd Jump		Overall	
Athlete	Event	Distance	Points	Distance	Points	Points	Rank
Natalie Dejmkova	Girls' individual	64.5m	99.1	63.5m	97.2	196.3	6

Team w/Nordic Combined

Athlete	Event	1st Round	2nd Round	Total	Rank
Natalie Dejmkova; Tomas Portyk; Tomas Friedrich	Mixed Team	239.3	298.2	537.5	8

== Snowboarding ==
The Czech Republic has qualified one boy and girl in snowboarding.

Boy

Athlete	Event	Qualifying			Semifinal			Final		
Athlete	Event	Run 1	Run 2	Rank	Run 1	Run 2	Rank	Run 1	Run 2	Rank
Ondrej Porkert	Boys' halfpipe	41.50	47.50	11	did not advance					
Ondrej Porkert	Boys' slopestyle	46.00	69.50	6 Q				24.25	75.50	8

Girl

Athlete	Event	Qualifying			Semifinal			Final		
Athlete	Event	Run 1	Run 2	Rank	Run 1	Run 2	Rank	Run 1	Run 2	Rank
Diana Augustinova	Girls' halfpipe	41.00	43.25	9 q	47.75	43.75	6	did not advance		
Diana Augustinova	Girls' slopestyle	48.50	47.00	12				did not advance		

== Speed skating ==
The Czech Republic has qualified one girl in speed skating.

Girl

Athlete	Event	Race 1	Race 2	Total	Rank
Nikola Zdráhalová	Girls' 500 m	44.97	44.86	89.83	8

== See also ==
- Czech Republic at the 2012 Summer Olympics
