= Canada at the 2012 Winter Youth Olympics =

- IOC code: CAN
- NOC: Canadian Olympic Committee
- Website: www.olympic.ca (in English and French)

in Innsbruck
- Competitors: 52 in 12 sports
- Flag bearer: Corryn Brown
- Medals Ranked 15th: Gold 2 Silver 1 Bronze 6 Total 9

Winter Youth Olympics appearances
- 2012; 2016; 2020; 2024

Canada competed at the 2012 Winter Youth Olympics in Innsbruck. Beckie Scott was named as the chef de mission.

Canada did not send any speed skaters (long and short track), along with figure skaters after the governing body for the sport in the country (Speed Skating Canada and Skate Canada, respectively) deemed the event "not developmentally appropriate".

== Medallists ==
Medal	Name	Sport	Event	Date
Gold	Michael Ciccarelli	Snowboarding	Boys' Slopestyle	19 Jan
Gold	Audrey McManiman	Snowboarding	Girls' Slopestyle	19 Jan
Silver	Roni Remme	Alpine Skiing	Girls' slalom	20 Jan
Bronze	Thomas Scoffin; Corryn Brown; Derek Oryniak; Emily Gray	Curling	Mixed Team	18 Jan
Bronze	Matt Herauf	Freestyle Skiing	Boys' ski cross	21 Jan
Bronze	Canada	Ice hockey	Boys	21 Jan
Bronze	Corey Gillies	Skeleton	Boys' Skeleton	21 Jan
Bronze	Carli Brockway	Skeleton	Girls' Skeleton	21 Jan
Bronze	Taylor Henrich; Nathaniel Mah; Dusty Korek	Ski Jumping	Mixed Team	21 Jan

== Alpine skiing ==
Canada had qualified a full team of two boys and two girls. The team was announced on June 22, 2011.

Boys
Athlete	Event	Final			
Athlete	Event	Run 1	Run 2	Total	Rank
Martin Grasic	Slalom	41.57	40.75	1:22.32	10
Martin Grasic	Giant slalom	DNF			
Martin Grasic	Super-G			DNF	
Martin Grasic	Combined	1:06.88	39.49	1:46.37	20
Lambert Quezel	Slalom	DNF			
Lambert Quezel	Giant slalom	1:00.75	56.66	1:57.41	16
Lambert Quezel	Super-G			1:07.40	20
Lambert Quezel	Combined	1:05.96	40.23	1:46.19	18

Girls
Athlete	Event	Final			
Athlete	Event	Run 1	Run 2	Total	Rank
Roni Remme	Slalom	42.05	39.20	1:21.25	2nd place, silver medalist(s)
Roni Remme	Giant slalom	1:00.04	1:00.03	2:00.07	15
Roni Remme	Super-G			DNF	
Roni Remme	Combined	1:06.37	36.89	1:43.26	9
Mikaela Tommy	Slalom	DNF			
Mikaela Tommy	Giant slalom	57.69	DNF		
Mikaela Tommy	Super-G			1:07.06	11
Mikaela Tommy	Combined	DNF			

Team
Athlete	Event	Quarterfinals	Semifinals	Final	Rank
Mikaela Tommy; Martin Grasic; Roni Remme; Lambert Quezel	Parallel mixed team	Austria; L 0-4	did not advance|		

== Biathlon ==
Canada had qualified a full biathlon team of 2 boys and 2 girls. Canada's roster was announced on April 19, 2011.

Boys
Athlete	Event	Final		
Athlete	Event	Time	Misses	Rank
Stuart Harden	Sprint	19:51.3	0	4
Stuart Harden	Pursuit	30:05.7	1	7
Aidan Millar	Sprint	23:23.1	7	43
Aidan Millar	Pursuit	34:.16.5	5	32

Girls
Athlete	Event	Final		
Athlete	Event	Time	Misses	Rank
Sarah Beaudry	Sprint	19:49.9	4	22
Sarah Beaudry	Pursuit	31:05.4	2	14
Danielle Vrielink	Sprint	18:45.9	1	9
Danielle Vrielink	Pursuit	30:34.8	2	11

Mixed
Athlete	Event	Final		
Athlete	Event	Time	Misses	Rank
Sarah Beaudry; Danielle Vrielink; Aidan Millar; Stuart Harden	Mixed relay	1:17:29.7	5+13	9
Danielle Vrielink; Maya Macisaac-Jones; Stuart Harden; Matthew Saurette	Cross-Country-Biathlon Mixed Relay	1:08:10.9	0+4	13

== Bobsleigh ==
Canada had qualified one boy and one girl sled.

Boys
Athlete	Event	Final			
Athlete	Event	Run 1	Run 2	Total	Rank
Payton Berezowski; Clay Sparks	Two-Boys	55.26	55.28	1:50.54	9

Girls
Athlete	Event	Final			
Athlete	Event	Run 1	Run 2	Total	Rank
Mercedes Miller; Casey Froese	Two-Girls	57.29	57.29	1:54.58	7

== Cross country skiing ==
Canada had qualified a team of 1 boy and 1 girl.

Boy
Athlete	Event	Final	
Athlete	Event	Time	Rank
Matthew Saurette	10km classical	32:55.8	29

Girl
Athlete	Event	Final	
Athlete	Event	Time	Rank
Maya Macisaac-Jones	5km classical	16:31.0	17

Sprint
Athlete	Event	Qualification		Quarterfinal		Semifinal		Final	
Athlete	Event	Total	Rank	Total	Rank	Total	Rank	Total	Rank
Matthew Saurette	Boys' sprint	1:49.26	23 Q	1:48.4	6	did not advance			
Maya Macisaac-Jones	Girls' sprint	2:01.99	15 Q	2:01.3	1 Q	2:02.4	4	did not advance	

Mixed
Athlete	Event	Final		
Athlete	Event	Time	Misses	Rank
Danielle Vrielink; Maya Macisaac-Jones; Stuart Harden; Matthew Saurette	Cross-Country-Biathlon Mixed Relay	1:08:10.9	0+4	13

== Curling ==
Canada had qualified a mixed curling team of 2 boys and 2 girls. Canada's roster was announced on April 8, 2011.

Skip: Thomas Scoffin
Third: Corryn Brown
Second: Derek Oryniak
Lead: Emily Gray

The mixed team event took place 14–18 January, while the mixed doubles tournament took place 20–22 January.

=== Mixed team ===
Final Round Robin Standings

Red Group	Skip	W	L
Sweden	Rasmus Wranå	6	1
Canada	Thomas Scoffin	5	2
Japan	Shingo Usui	4	3
Italy	Amos Mosaner	4	3
Great Britain	Duncan Menzies	3	4
Russia	Mikhail Vaskov	3	4
Austria	Mathias Genner	2	5
Germany	Daniel Rothballer	1	6

==== Round-robin results ====
Draw 1

Sheet C	1	2	3	4	5	6	7	8	Final
Germany (Rothballer) 🔨	2	1	0	0	0	0	1	0	4
Canada (Scoffin)	0	0	2	1	0	2	0	1	6

Draw 2

Sheet A	1	2	3	4	5	6	7	8	Final
Austria (Genner)	0	0	0	1	0	3	0	2	6
Canada (Scoffin) 🔨	0	3	0	0	1	0	1	0	5

Draw 3

Sheet C	1	2	3	4	5	6	7	8	Final
Canada (Scoffin) 🔨	0	1	0	0	1	1	3	X	6
Italy (Mosaner)	0	0	0	0	0	0	0	X	0

Draw 4

Sheet D	1	2	3	4	5	6	7	8	Final
Canada (Scoffin) 🔨	1	2	0	4	0	1	X	X	8
Great Britain (Menzies)	0	0	0	0	2	0	X	X	2

Draw 5

Sheet B	1	2	3	4	5	6	7	8	Final
Russia (Vaskov) 🔨	0	0	0	0	1	0	X	X	1
Canada (Scoffin)	1	2	2	1	0	1	X	X	7

Draw 6

Sheet D	1	2	3	4	5	6	7	8	9	Final
Sweden (Wranå) 🔨	0	1	0	0	2	0	2	0	1	6
Canada (Scoffin)	1	0	1	0	0	1	0	2	0	5

Draw 7

Sheet A	1	2	3	4	5	6	7	8	Final
Canada (Scoffin) 🔨	3	0	0	0	4	0	2	X	9
Japan (Usui)	0	1	0	1	0	2	0	X	4

==== Quarterfinals ====
Sheet A	1	2	3	4	5	6	7	8	Final
Canada (Scoffin)	2	0	1	0	0	2	1	0	7
Czech Republic (Černovský) 🔨	0	2	0	3	2	0	0	0	6

==== Semifinals ====
Sheet D	1	2	3	4	5	6	7	8	Final
Canada (Scoffin)	0	1	0	0	1	0	0	X	2
Italy (Mosaner) 🔨	2	0	1	3	0	1	1	X	8

==== Bronze-medal game ====
Sheet B	1	2	3	4	5	6	7	8	Final
Canada (Scoffin)	1	0	2	0	1	1	0	1	6
Sweden (Wranå) 🔨	0	1	0	3	0	0	0	0	4

Final rank: (bronze)

=== Mixed doubles ===
==== Round of 32 ====
Sheet C	1	2	3	4	5	6	7	8	Final
Thomas Scoffin (CAN); Kelsi Heath (NZL)	0	0	4	1	1	0	3	X	9
Mizuki Kitaguchi (JPN); Thomas Muirhead (GBR) 🔨	1	2	0	0	0	2	0	X	5

Sheet C	1	2	3	4	5	6	7	8	Final
Corryn Brown (CAN); Martin Reichel (AUT) 🔨	1	0	0	3	0	1	1	0	6
Shingo Usui (JPN); Cao Ying (CHN)	0	1	1	0	1	0	0	1	4

Sheet C	1	2	3	4	5	6	7	8	Final
Robert-Kent Päll (EST); Emily Gray (CAN)	0	0	0	2	0	0	0	X	2
Anastasia Moskaleva (RUS); Tsukasa Horigome (JPN) 🔨	1	1	3	0	1	1	1	X	8

Sheet C	1	2	3	4	5	6	7	8	Final
Frederike Manner (GER); Derek Oryniak (CAN)	0	0	0	1	0	0	X	X	1
Yoo Min-hyeon (KOR); Mako Tamakuma (JPN) 🔨	3	2	3	0	5	1	X	X	14

==== Round of 16 ====
Sheet A	1	2	3	4	5	6	7	8	Final
Corryn Brown (CAN); Martin Reichel (AUT) 🔨	1	1	1	2	0	1	1	0	7
Kang Sue-yeon (KOR); Krystof Krupanský (CZE)	0	0	0	0	2	0	0	2	4

Sheet A	1	2	3	4	5	6	7	8	Final
Thomas Scoffin (CAN); Kelsi Heath (NZL)	0	1	0	1	1	0	2	0	5
Mikhail Vaskov (RUS); Zuzana Hrůzová (CZE) 🔨	2	0	1	0	0	1	0	2	6

==== Quarterfinals ====
Sheet D	1	2	3	4	5	6	7	8	Final
Korey Dropkin (USA); Marina Verenich (RUS)	1	2	2	0	4	0	0	X	9
Corryn Brown (CAN); Martin Reichel (AUT) 🔨	0	0	0	1	0	1	1	X	3

== Figure skating ==
Canada had qualified an ice dancing team, a pair, and 2 boys' singles skaters. However, on January 4, 2012, it was announced that, due to a scheduling conflict with the Canadian nationals (held in Moncton, NB), Canada would not send figure skaters after all.

== Freestyle skiing ==
Canada had qualified a full freestyle skiing team of 4 athletes.

Half-pipe
Athlete	Event	Qualification		Final	
Athlete	Event	Time	Rank	Time	Rank
Aaron MacKay	Boys' halfpipe	72.25	5 Q	76.50	6
Shannon Gunning	Girls' halfpipe	64.00	4 Q	62.00	4

Ski cross
Athlete	Event	Qualifying		1/4 finals	Semifinals	Final
Athlete	Event	Time	Rank	Rank	Rank	Rank
Matt Herauf	Boys' ski cross	57.34	3rd place, bronze medalist(s)	Cancelled		
India Sherret	Girls' ski cross	1:00.21	4	Cancelled		

== Ice hockey ==
Canada would enter a boys team and it consisted of 17 athletes.

The co-coaches were announced October 14, 2011, and would be Jim Hulton and Curtis Hunt.

The players were announced October 21, 2011, and were selected through a process that involved a random draw from a list of 39 names established by Hockey Canada's thirteen branches, with each branch guaranteed at least one representative (Ontario, Québec and Alberta were guaranteed one extra representative each). The players selected are as follows.

Goaltenders:

- Keven Bouchard (QC)
- Sam Walsh (PEI)

Defence:

- Josh Carrick (ON)
- Jarrett Crossman (NB)
- Joe Hicketts (BC)
- Brycen Martin (AB)
- Brendan Nickerson (NS)
- Ryan Pilon (SK)

Forwards:

- Adam Brooks (MB)
- Ryan Burton (ON)
- Eric Cornel (ON)
- Reid Duke (AB)
- Reid Gardiner (SK)
- Ryan Gropp (BC)
- Nicolas Hébert (QC)
- Garrett James (ON)
- Nathan Yetman (NL)

Legend
Advance to the semifinals

Group A

Legend
Teams to Playoffs

Team	GP	W	OTW	OTL	L	GF	GA	Diff	PTS
Russia	4	3	0	0	1	25	9	+16	9
Canada	4	2	1	0	1	20	7	+13	8
Finland	4	2	0	1	1	13	11	+2	7
United States	4	2	0	0	2	14	18	–4	6
Austria	4	0	0	0	4	3	30	–27	0

January 13, 2012; 14:45	Russia	4–3 (2–1, 2–1, 0–1)	Canada	Tyrolean Ice Arena; Attendance: 932

Game reference

Sergey Korobov
Goalies
Keven Bouchard
Referee:
(Sweden) Andreas Harnebring
Linesmen:
(Sweden) Daniel Persson
(Austria) Martin Smeibidlo

A. Protapovich (E. Tsvetkov) – 5:08	1–0
	1–1	5:33 – R. Pilon (J. Hicketts, R. Gardiner)
E. Tsvetkov – 11:56	2–1
M. Lazarev (I. Nikolishin) (SH) – 18:58	3–1
	3–2	21:37 – A. Brooks (J. Carrick)
D. Vovchenko (I. Nikolishin) – 26:38	4–2
	4–3	42:05 – R. Gardiner (J. Hicketts)

2 min
Penalties
4 min
29
Shots
23

January 15, 2012; 18:00	Canada	5–1 (1–0, 2–1, 2–0)	United States	Tyrolean Ice Arena; Attendance: 2,575

Keven Bouchard
Goalies
Logan Halladay
Referee:
(Germany) Simon Aicher
Linesmen:
(Belarus) Andrei Haurylenka
(Slovenia) Tilen Pahor

E. Cornel – 3:58	1–0
R. Gropp (E. Cornel) – 16:30	2–0
	2–1	17:39 – B. Clarke (J. Jacobs)
R. Duke (A. Brooks, R. Pilon) – 28:54	3–1
A. Brooks (B. Martin, R. Gardiner) (PP) – 43:21	4–1
R. Gropp (R. Gardiner, E. Cornel) (PP) – 44:06	5–1

2 min
Penalties
12 min
27
Shots
16

January 17, 2012; 11:15	Austria	0–9 (0–4, 0–2, 0–3)	Canada	Tyrolean Ice Arena; Attendance: 749

Stefan Müller
Goalies
Sam Walsh
Referee:
(Norway) Stian Halm
Linesmen:
(Belarus) Andrei Haurylenka
(Germany) Benjamin Hoppe

0–1	0:40 – A. Brooks (N. Hébert, B. Martin)
0–2	2:16 – R. Burton (N. Yetman, J. Crossman)
0–3	6:15 – R. Gropp (E. Cornel) (PP)
0–4	12:07 – E. Cornel (R. Gropp)
0–5	16:42 – R. Gardiner (R. Gropp)
0–6	24:35 – G. James
0–7	38:31 – R. Duke (B. Martin, A. Brooks) (PP)
0–8	40:14 – R. Pilon
0–9	41:24 – R. Duke (B. Martin, J. Carrick)

10 min
Penalties
6 min
16
Shots
44

January 18, 2012; 11:45	Canada	3–2 GWS (0–0, 2–1, 0–1) (OT: 0–0) (SO: 2–1)	Finland	Tyrolean Ice Arena; Attendance: 1,261

Keven Bouchard
Goalies
Kaapo Kahkonen
Referee:
(Sweden) Andreas Harnebring
Linesmen:
(Belarus) Andrei Haurylenka
(Austria) Martin Smeibidlo

A. Brooks (R. Duke) – 15:11	1–0
	1–1	21:05 – J. Kiviranta (M. Pitkanen)
E. Cornel (R. Gropp, J. Hicketts) – 22:01	2–1
	2–2	36:42 – J. Kiviranta (M. Pitkanen, O. Nieminen)

E. Cornel (miss)
R. Gropp
R. Gardiner
Shootout
(miss) J. Kiviranta
K. Kapanen
(miss) M. Honkanen
6 min
Penalties
8 min
27
Shots
25

=== Semifinals ===
January 20, 2012; 18:45	Canada	1–2 (1–1, 0–0, 0–1)	Finland	Tyrolean Ice Arena; Attendance: 1,426

Keven Bouchard
Goalies
Kaapo Kahkonen
Referee:
(Germany) Simon Aicher
Linesmen:
(Germany) Benjamin Hoppe
(Slovenia) Tilen Pahor

J. Carrick (R. Gardiner, E. Cornel) (PP) – 4:17	1–0
	1–1	11:29 – O. Nieminen (J. Kiviranta, M. Pitkanen)
	1–2	40:26 – E. Sopanen (O. Nieminen, M. Pitkanen) (PP)

8 min
Penalties
10 min
17
Shots
19

=== Bronze-medal game ===
January 21, 2012; 14:45	Canada	7 – 5 (3–1, 4–1, 0–3)	United States	Tyrolean Ice Arena; Attendance: 1,592

Keven Bouchard
Goalies
Logan Halladay
Referee:
(Norway) Stian Halm
Linesmen:
(Germany) Benjamin Hoppe
(Austria) Martin Smeibidlo

E. Cornel (R. Gardiner, J. Hicketts) (PP) – 4:19	1–0
R. Pilon (R. Gardiner, E. Cornel) – 6:58	2–0
R. Gropp (R. Gardiner, R. Pilon) (PP) – 13:22	3–0
	3–1	14:53 – N. Billitier (A. Baughman)
	3–2	19:40 – R. MacInnis (J. Eichel)
A. Brooks (R. Duke, B. Martin) – 21:27	4–2
R. Gardiner (J. Hicketts) – 22:35	5–2
R. Gropp – 23:10	6–2
R. Gropp (R. Gardiner) – 25:40	7–2
	7–3	31:44 – J. Eichel (N. Schmaltz)
	7–4	38:54 – N. Magyar (J. Jacobs, J. Wegwerth)
	7–5	40:10 – N. Schmaltz (R. MacInnis, M. Godbout) (PP)

8 min
Penalties
12 min
19
Shots
40

Final rank: (bronze)

== Luge ==
Canada had qualified a team of two boys and one girl.

Boys
Athlete	Event	Run 1	Run 2	Total	Rank
John Fenell	Boys' singles	40.162	40.029	1:20.191	7
Mitchel Malyk	Boys' singles	40.096	39.947	1:20.043	5

Girls
Athlete	Event	Run 1	Run 2	Total	Rank
Tara Disturnal	Girls' singles	40.793	40.903	1:21.696	11

== Nordic combined ==
Canada had qualified one boy athlete.

Boy
Athlete	Event	Ski jumping		Cross-country		Final	
Athlete	Event	Points	Rank	Deficit	Ski Time	Total Time	Rank
Nathaniel Mah	Boys' individual	122.6	9	1:00	28:35.0	29:35.0	11

== Skeleton ==
Canada had qualified one boy and one girl in skeleton.

Boy
Athlete	Event	Final			
Athlete	Event	Run 1	Run 2	Total	Rank
Corey Gillies	Boys' individual	58.35	57.47	1:55.82	3rd place, bronze medalist(s)

Girl
Athlete	Event	Final			
Athlete	Event	Run 1	Run 2	Total	Rank
Carli Brockway	Girls' individual	CAN	58.48	58.48	3rd place, bronze medalist(s)

== Ski jumping ==
Canada had qualified one boy and one girl athlete.

Boys
Athlete	Event	1st Jump		2nd Jump		Overall	
Athlete	Event	Distance	Points	Distance	Points	Points	Rank
Dusty Korek	Boys' individual	72.5m	123.8	70.5m	117.0	240.8	8

Girls
Athlete	Event	1st Jump		2nd Jump		Overall	
Athlete	Event	Distance	Points	Distance	Points	Points	Rank
Taylor Henrich	Girls' individual	64.0m	99.4	66.0m	105.2	204.6	5

Team w/Nordic Combined
Athlete	Event	1st Round	2nd Round	Total	Rank
Taylor Henrich; Nathaniel Mah; Dusty Korek	Mixed Team	277.1	309.9	587.0	3rd place, bronze medalist(s)

== Snowboarding ==
Canada had qualified a full team of 4 athletes (2 boys and 2 girls).

Men
Athlete	Event	Qualifying			Semifinal			Final		
Athlete	Event	Run 1	Run 2	Rank	Run 1	Run 2	Rank	Run 1	Run 2	Rank
Michael Ciccarelli	Boys' halfpipe	53.25	78.75	4 q	84.75	77.25	1 Q	74.50	84.00	4
Michael Ciccarelli	Boys' slopestyle	86.50	90.75	1 Q				85.75	94.25	1st place, gold medalist(s)
Tyler Nicholson	Boys' slopestyle	55.75	82.75	3 Q				44.25	84.00	6

Women
Athlete	Event	Qualifying			Semifinal			Final		
Athlete	Event	Run 1	Run 2	Rank	Run 1	Run 2	Rank	Run 1	Run 2	Rank
Audrey McManiman	Girls' halfpipe	51.50	37.00	7 q	64.25	34.00	4	did not advance		
Audrey McManiman	Girls' slopestyle	83.00	30.00	1 Q				84.25	62.75	1st place, gold medalist(s)
Quincy Korte-King	Girls' halfpipe	57.00	59.00	5 q	48.25	71.75	3 Q	61.25	69.75	5
Quincy Korte-King	Girls' slopestyle	75.75	66.00	6 Q				49.00	51.50	7

== See also ==
- Canada at the 2012 Summer Olympics
