= Uzbekistan at the 2012 Winter Youth Olympics =

- IOC code: UZB
- NOC: National Olympic Committee of the Republic of Uzbekistan

in Innsbruck
- Competitors: 1 in 1 sport
- Flag bearer: Arkadiy Semenchenko
- Medals: Gold 0 Silver 0 Bronze 0 Total 0

Winter Youth Olympics appearances (overview)
- 2012; 2016; 2020; 2024

Uzbekistan competed at the 2012 Winter Youth Olympics in Innsbruck, Austria. The Uzbek team consisted of one athlete an alpine skier.

== Alpine skiing ==
Uzbekistan qualified 1 athlete.

Men

Athlete	Event	Final			
Athlete	Event	Run 1	Run 2	Total	Rank
Arkadiy Semenchenko	Slalom	54.44	49.94	1:44.38	31
Arkadiy Semenchenko	Giant slalom	DNF			
Arkadiy Semenchenko	Super-G			1:17.50	40
Arkadiy Semenchenko	Combined	1:14.30	DNF		

== See also ==
- Uzbekistan at the 2012 Summer Olympics
