= Andorra at the 2012 Winter Youth Olympics =

- IOC code: AND
- NOC: Andorran Olympic Committee
- Website: www.coa.ad

in Innsbruck
- Competitors: 4 in 3 sports
- Flag bearer: Sara Ramentol
- Medals Ranked 29th: Gold 0 Silver 0 Bronze 1 Total 1

Winter Youth Olympics appearances (overview)
- 2012; 2016; 2020; 2024

Andorra competed at the 2012 Winter Youth Olympics in Innsbruck, Austria. The Andorran team consisted of 4 athletes competing in 3 sports.

== Medalists ==
Medal	Name	Sport	Event	Date
Bronze	Joan Verdu Sanchez	Alpine skiing	Boys' super-G	14 Jan

== Alpine skiing ==
Andorra qualified one boy and girl in alpine skiing.

=== Boy ===
Athlete	Event	Final			
Athlete	Event	Run 1	Run 2	Total	Rank
Joan Verdu Sanchez	Slalom	41.27	40.06	1:21.33	8
Joan Verdu Sanchez	Giant slalom	DNF			
Joan Verdu Sanchez	Super-G			1:04.65	3rd place, bronze medalist(s)
Joan Verdu Sanchez	Combined	1:04.58	DNF		

=== Girls ===
Athlete	Event	Final			
Athlete	Event	Run 1	Run 2	Total	Rank
Sara Ramentol	Slalom	DNF			
Sara Ramentol	Giant slalom	DSQ			
Sara Ramentol	Super-G			1:07.96	16
Sara Ramentol	Combined	1:08.53	40.75	1:49.28	21

== Freestyle skiing ==
Andorra qualified one boy in freestyle skiing.

Ski Half-Pipe

Athlete	Event	Qualifying		Final	
Athlete	Event	Points	Rank	Points	Rank
Ian Serra Carrillo	Boys' ski half-pipe	40.50	13	did not advance	

== Snowboarding ==
Andorra qualified one girl in snowboarding.

Girl

Athlete	Event	Qualifying			Semifinal			Final		
Athlete	Event	Run 1	Run 2	Rank	Run 1	Run 2	Rank	Run 1	Run 2	Rank
Maeva Estevez	Girls' halfpipe	15.00	11.75	14	did not advance					
Maeva Estevez	Girls' slopestyle	DNS						did not advance		

== See also ==
- Andorra at the 2012 Summer Olympics
