= Switzerland at the 2012 Winter Youth Olympics =

- IOC code: SUI
- NOC: Swiss Olympic Association
- Website: www.swissolympic.ch

in Innsbruck
- Competitors: 26 in 11 sports
- Flag bearer: Jasmina Suter
- Medals Ranked 7th: Gold 3 Silver 0 Bronze 5 Total 8

Winter Youth Olympics appearances
- 2012; 2016; 2020; 2024

Switzerland competed at the 2012 Winter Youth Olympics in Innsbruck, Austria.

== Medalists ==
Medal	Name	Sport	Event	Date
Gold	Kai Mahler	Freestyle skiing	Boys' halfpipe	15 Jan
Gold	Michael Brunner; Elena Stern; Romano Meier; Lisa Gisler	Curling	Mixed Team	18 Jan
Gold	Sandro Simonet	Alpine Skiing	Boys' slalom	21 Jan
Bronze	Sandro Simonet	Alpine Skiing	Boys' combined	15 Jan
Bronze	Jasmina Suter	Alpine Skiing	Girls' giant slalom	18 Jan
Bronze	Sandro Simonet	Alpine skiing	Boys' giant slalom	19 Jan
Bronze	David Habluetzel	Snowboarding	Boys' Slopestyle	19 Jan
Bronze	Emilie Benz	Freestyle Skiing	Girls' ski cross	21 Jan

== Alpine skiing ==
Switzerland qualified 4 athletes.

Boys

Athlete	Event	Final			
Athlete	Event	Run 1	Run 2	Total	Rank
Ian Gut	Slalom	46.96	DNF		
Ian Gut	Giant slalom	1:00.15	55.39	1:55.54	10
Ian Gut	Super-G			1:06.06	13
Ian Gut	Combined	1:05.47	DNF		
Sandro Simonet	Slalom	38.62	39.74	1:18.36	1st place, gold medalist(s)
Sandro Simonet	Giant slalom	57.46	54.87	1:52.33	3rd place, bronze medalist(s)
Sandro Simonet	Super-G			1:05.71	11
Sandro Simonet	Combined	1:04.33	37.12	1:41.45	3rd place, bronze medalist(s)

Girls

Athlete	Event	Final			
Athlete	Event	Run 1	Run 2	Total	Rank
Luana Fluetsch	Slalom	41.61	DNF		
Luana Fluetsch	Giant slalom	58.70	59.71	1:58.41	8
Luana Fluetsch	Super-G			1:06.99	10
Luana Fluetsch	Combined	1:06.01	36.53	1:42.54	7
Jasmina Suter	Slalom	42.38	39.26	1:21.64	4
Jasmina Suter	Giant slalom	57.74	58.71	1:56.45	3rd place, bronze medalist(s)
Jasmina Suter	Super-G			DNF	
Jasmina Suter	Combined	1:05.84	DNF		

Team

Athlete	Event	Quarterfinals	Semifinals	Final	Rank
Jasmina Suter; Ian Gut; Luana Fluetsch; Sandro Simonet	Parallel mixed team	Norway; L 1-2	did not advance		5

== Biathlon ==
Switzerland qualified 3 athletes.

Boys

Athlete	Event	Final		
Athlete	Event	Time	Misses	Rank
Jules Cuenot	Sprint	21:18.4	4	18
Jules Cuenot	Pursuit	32:15.3	8	18
Kenneth Schöpfer	Sprint	22:14.2	4	26
Kenneth Schöpfer	Pursuit	32:01.5	3	17

Girls

Athlete	Event	Final		
Athlete	Event	Time	Misses	Rank
Aita Gasparin	Sprint	19:33.4	3	20
Aita Gasparin	Pursuit	31:32.1	4	16

Mixed

Athlete	Event	Final		
Athlete	Event	Time	Misses	Rank
Aita Gasparin; Nadine Fähndrich; Kenneth Schöpfer; Jason Rüesch	Cross-Country-Biathlon Mixed Relay	1:05:36.0	0+5	4

== Cross-country skiing ==
Switzerland qualified 2 athletes.

Boys

Athlete	Event	Final	
Athlete	Event	Time	Rank
Jason Rüesch	10km classical	31:10.4	11

Girls

Athlete	Event	Final	
Athlete	Event	Time	Rank
Nadine Fähndrich	5km classical	15:56.6	10

Sprint

Athlete	Event	Qualification		Quarterfinal		Semifinal		Final	
Athlete	Event	Total	Rank	Total	Rank	Total	Rank	Total	Rank
Jason Rüesch	Boys' sprint	1:45.81	8 Q	1:46.1	2 Q	1:58.2	5	did not advance	
Nadine Fähndrich	Girls' sprint	2:00.01	6 Q	2:01.7	2 Q	2:01.1	4	did not advance	

Mixed

Athlete	Event	Final		
Athlete	Event	Time	Misses	Rank
Aita Gasparin; Nadine Fähndrich; Kenneth Schöpfer; Jason Rüesch	Cross-Country-Biathlon Mixed Relay	1:05:36.0	0+5	4

== Curling ==
Switzerland qualified 1 team.

Roster

- Skip: Michael Brunner
- Third: Elena Stern
- Second: Romano Meier
- Lead: Lisa Gisler

=== Mixed Team ===
Final Round Robin Standings

Blue Group	Skip	W	L
United States	Korey Dropkin	7	0
Switzerland	Michael Brunner	6	1
Czech Republic	Marek Černovský	4	3
China	Bai Yang	3	4
Norway	Markus Skogvold	3	4
South Korea	Kang Sue-yeon	2	5
New Zealand	Luke Steele	2	5
Estonia	Robert-Kent Päll	1	6

==== Round-robin results ====
Draw 1

Sheet B	1	2	3	4	5	6	7	8	Final
Switzerland (Brunner)	1	1	0	1	0	2	1	X	6
New Zealand (Steele) 🔨	0	0	1	0	1	0	0	X	2

Draw 2

Sheet C	1	2	3	4	5	6	7	8	Final
Norway (Skogvold)	0	0	2	0	0	0	X	X	2
Switzerland (Brunner) 🔨	2	1	0	3	1	1	X	X	8

Draw 3

Sheet A	1	2	3	4	5	6	7	8	Final
Switzerland (Brunner) 🔨	1	3	3	3	2	0	X	X	12
Estonia (Päll)	0	0	0	0	0	1	X	X	1

Draw 4

Sheet D	1	2	3	4	5	6	7	8	Final
United States (Dropkin) 🔨	2	0	1	0	0	2	0	1	6
Switzerland (Brunner)	0	2	0	1	0	0	1	0	4

Draw 5

Sheet A	1	2	3	4	5	6	7	8	Final
China (Bai) 🔨	1	0	0	1	0	1	0	X	3
Switzerland (Brunner)	0	1	1	0	1	0	4	X	7

Draw 6

Sheet B	1	2	3	4	5	6	7	8	Final
South Korea (Kang)	0	0	0	1	0	1	0	X	2
Switzerland (Brunner) 🔨	1	0	1	0	3	0	1	X	6

Draw 7

Sheet D	1	2	3	4	5	6	7	8	Final
Switzerland (Brunner) 🔨	0	1	4	0	2	0	1	X	8
Czech Republic (Černovský)	0	0	0	1	0	3	0	X	4

==== Quarterfinals ====
Sheet D	1	2	3	4	5	6	7	8	Final
Japan (Usui)	0	0	1	1	0	0	1	0	3
Switzerland (Brunner) 🔨	0	0	0	0	0	3	0	1	4

==== Semifinals ====
Sheet A	1	2	3	4	5	6	7	8	Final
Sweden (Wranå)	0	1	0	2	0	1	X	X	4
Switzerland (Brunner) 🔨	3	0	2	0	5	0	X	X	10

==== Gold Medal Game ====
Sheet C	1	2	3	4	5	6	7	8	Final
Italy (Mosaner)	0	1	0	2	0	1	0	X	4
Switzerland (Brunner) 🔨	2	0	2	0	1	0	1	X	6

=== Mixed doubles ===
==== Round of 32 ====
Sheet A	1	2	3	4	5	6	7	8	Final
Michael Brunner (SUI); Nicole Muskatewitz (GER) 🔨	0	2	0	2	0	2	1	1	8
Sarah Anderson (USA); Go Ke-on (KOR)	1	0	4	0	1	0	0	0	6

Sheet A	1	2	3	4	5	6	7	8	Final
Elena Stern (SUI); Sander Rõuk (EST) 🔨	2	0	0	0	1	0	X	X	3
Korey Dropkin (USA); Marina Verenich (RUS)	0	2	1	4	0	6	X	X	13

Sheet A	1	2	3	4	5	6	7	8	Final
Mathias Genner (AUT); Lisa Gisler (SUI)	0	0	0	1	0	1	0	X	2
Yang Ying (CHN); Thomas Howell (USA) 🔨	3	1	2	0	3	0	1	X	10

Sheet A	1	2	3	4	5	6	7	8	9	Final
Eleanor Adviento (NZL); Romano Meier (SUI) 🔨	2	0	1	0	1	0	3	0	0	7
Duncan Menzies (GBR); Taylor Anderson (USA)	0	1	0	2	0	2	0	2	1	8

==== Round of 16 ====
Sheet C	1	2	3	4	5	6	7	8	Final
Michael Brunner (SUI); Nicole Muskatewitz (GER) 🔨	1	1	1	1	1	0	1	X	6
Wang Jinbo (CHN); Ina Roll Backe (NOR)	0	0	0	0	0	1	0	X	1

==== Quarterfinals ====
Sheet B	1	2	3	4	5	6	7	8	Final
Michael Brunner (SUI); Nicole Muskatewitz (GER)	0	0	1	2	1	0	3	1	8
Mikhail Vaskov (RUS); Zuzana Hrůzová (CZE) 🔨	1	1	0	0	0	1	0	0	3

==== Semifinals ====
Sheet A	1	2	3	4	5	6	7	8	Final
Michael Brunner (SUI); Nicole Muskatewitz (GER)	1	1	0	2	0	3	0	X	7
Korey Dropkin (USA); Marina Verenich (RUS) 🔨	0	0	1	0	1	0	1	X	3

==== Gold Medal Game ====
Sheet C	1	2	3	4	5	6	7	8	Final
Michael Brunner (SUI); Nicole Muskatewitz (GER) 🔨	3	2	0	4	0	4	X	X	13
Martin Sesaker (NOR); Kim Eun-bi (KOR)	0	0	1	0	1	0	X	X	2

== Figure skating ==
Switzerland qualified 2 athletes.

Boys

Athlete(s)	Event	SP/OD		FS/FD		Total	
Athlete(s)	Event	Points	Rank	Points	Rank	Points	Rank
Nicola Todeschini	Singles	44.02	9	84.96	11	128.98	10

Girls

Athlete(s)	Event	SP/OD		FS/FD		Total	
Athlete(s)	Event	Points	Rank	Points	Rank	Points	Rank
Tina Stuerzinger	Singles	40.63	8	72.92	8	113.55	8

Mixed

Athletes	Event	Boys'			Girls'			Ice Dance			Total	
Athletes	Event	Score	Rank	Points	Score	Rank	Points	Score	Rank	Points	Points	Rank
Team 1 Feodosi Efremenkov (RUS); Tina Stuerzinger (SUI); Millie Paterson/Edward Carstairs (GBR)	Team Trophy	117.13	1	8	73.46	5	4	44.02	8	1	13	5

== Freestyle skiing ==
Switzerland qualified 4 athletes.

Ski Cross

Athlete	Event	Qualifying		1/4 finals	Semifinals	Final
Athlete	Event	Time	Rank	Rank	Rank	Rank
Vincent Gentet	Boys' ski cross	59.45	12	Cancelled		
Emilie Benz	Girls' ski cross	58.82	3rd place, bronze medalist(s)	Cancelled		

Ski Half-Pipe

Athlete	Event	Qualifying		Final	
Athlete	Event	Points	Rank	Points	Rank
Kai Mahler	Boys' ski half-pipe	76.50	2 Q	95.00	1st place, gold medalist(s)
Alexia Bonelli	Girls' ski half-pipe	53.50	6 Q	47.75	6

== Luge ==
Switzerland qualified 1 athlete.

Boys

Athlete	Event	Final			
Athlete	Event	Run 1	Run 2	Total	Rank
Chritian Maag	Boys' singles	40.130	40.074	1:20.204	8

== Nordic combined ==
Switzerland qualified 1 athlete.

Boys

Athlete	Event	Ski jumping		Cross-country		Final	
Athlete	Event	Points	Rank	Deficit	Ski Time	Total Time	Rank
Jan Kirchhofer	Boys' individual	125.7	7	0:47	27:52.8	28:39.8	9

== Skeleton ==
Switzerland qualified 1 athlete.

Boys

Athlete	Event	Final			
Athlete	Event	Run 1	Run 2	Total	Rank
Sacha Berger	Boys' individual	59.02	58.66	1:57.68	5

== Ski jumping ==
Switzerland qualified 1 athlete.

Boys

Athlete	Event	1st Jump		2nd Jump		Overall	
Athlete	Event	Distance	Points	Distance	Points	Points	Rank
Killian Peier	Boys' individual	71.5m	119.9	70.5m	117.0	236.9	9

== Snowboarding ==
Switzerland qualified 2 athletes.

Boys

Athlete	Event	Qualifying			Semifinal			Final		
Athlete	Event	Run 1	Run 2	Rank	Run 1	Run 2	Rank	Run 1	Run 2	Rank
Lucas Baume	Boys' halfpipe	31.75	62.25	6 q	DNS	DNS	-	did not advance		
Lucas Baume	Boys' slopestyle	79.25	29.25	3 Q				51.25	57.25	10
David Habluetzel	Boys' halfpipe	78.25	82.75	3 Q				49.00	80.25	5
David Habluetzel	Boys' slopestyle	75.00	68.75	4 Q				57.75	87.50	3rd place, bronze medalist(s)

Girls

Athlete	Event	Qualifying			Semifinal			Final		
Athlete	Event	Run 1	Run 2	Rank	Run 1	Run 2	Rank	Run 1	Run 2	Rank
Celia Petrig	Girls' halfpipe	31.50	41.75	10	did not advance					
Celia Petrig	Girls' slopestyle	79.50	32.75	2 Q				62.00	40.75	4

== See also ==
- Switzerland at the 2012 Summer Olympics
