= Russia at the 2012 Winter Youth Olympics =

- IOC code: RUS
- NOC: Russian Olympic Committee
- Website: www.olympic.ru (in Russian and English)

in Innsbruck
- Competitors: 67 in 15 sports
- Flag bearer: Sergey Mozgov
- Medals Ranked 5th: Gold 5 Silver 4 Bronze 7 Total 16

Winter Youth Olympics appearances (overview)
- 2012; 2016; 2020; 2024

Russia competed at the 2012 Winter Youth Olympics in Innsbruck, Austria.

== Medalists ==
Medal	Name	Sport	Event	Date
Gold	Uliana Kaysheva	Biathlon	Girls' Pursuit	16 January
Gold	Anastasia Sedova	Cross-country skiing	Girls' 5 kilometre classical	17 January
Gold	Alexander Selyaninov	Cross-country skiing	Boys' 10 kilometre classical	17 January
Gold	Anna Yanovskaya; Sergey Mozgov	Figure skating	Ice dancing	17 January
Gold	Elizaveta Tuktamysheva	Figure skating	Girls' singles	17 January
Silver	Lina Fedorova; Maxim Miroshkin	Figure skating	Pair Skating	16 January
Silver	Adelina Sotnikova	Figure skating	Girls' singles	17 January
Silver	Uliana Kaysheva; Anastasia Sedova; Alexander Selyaninov; Ivan Galushkin	Cross-country skiing Biathlon	Cross-country / Biathlon mixed relay	21 January
Silver	Russian team	Ice hockey	Boys' tournament	22 January
Bronze	Uliana Kaysheva	Biathlon	Girls' sprint	15 January
Bronze	Feodosi Efremenkov	Figure skating	Boys' singles	16 January
Bronze	Anastasia Dolidze; Vadim Ivanov	Figure skating	Pair Skating	16 January
Bronze	Maria Simonova; Dmitri Dragun	Figure skating	Ice dancing	17 January
Bronze	Alexander Selyaninov	Cross-country skiing	Boys' sprint	19 January
Bronze	Ekaterina Tkachenko	Alpine skiing	Girls' slalom	20 January
Bronze	Vasiliy Pudushkin	Speed skating	Boys' mass start	20 January

Medals by sport
Sport	1st place, gold medalist(s)	2nd place, silver medalist(s)	3rd place, bronze medalist(s)	Total
Figure skating	2	2	3	7
Cross-country skiing	2	0	1	3
Biathlon	1	0	1	2
Ice hockey	0	1	0	1
Mixed sports	0	1	0	1
Alpine skiing	0	0	1	1
Speed skating	0	0	1	1
Total	5	4	7	16

Medals by date
Day	Date	1st place, gold medalist(s)	2nd place, silver medalist(s)	3rd place, bronze medalist(s)	Total
Day 1	14 January	0	0	0	6
Day 2	15 January	0	0	1	1
Day 3	16 January	1	1	2	4
Day 4	17 January	4	1	1	6
Day 5	18 January	0	0	0	0
Day 6	19 January	0	0	1	1
Day 7	20 January	0	0	2	2
Day 8	21 January	0	1	0	1
Day 9	22 January	0	1	0	1
Total		5	4	7	16

== Alpine skiing ==
Russia qualified 2 athletes.

Boys

Athlete	Event	Final			
Athlete	Event	Run 1	Run 2	Total	Rank
Artem Pak	Slalom	44.70	41.31	1:26.01	20
Artem Pak	Giant slalom	1:00.50	55.59	1:56.09	12
Artem Pak	Super-G			1:06.27	15
Artem Pak	Combined	1:06.56	DNF		

Girls

Athlete	Event	Final			
Athlete	Event	Run 1	Run 2	Total	Rank
Ekaterina Tkachenko	Slalom	42.39	39.23	1.21.62	3rd place, bronze medalist(s)
Ekaterina Tkachenko	Giant slalom	58.61	59.41	1:58.02	7
Ekaterina Tkachenko	Super-G			1:07.39	14
Ekaterina Tkachenko	Combined	1:05.88	37.21	1:43.09	8

== Biathlon ==
Russia qualified 4 athletes.

Boys

Athlete	Event	Final		
Athlete	Event	Time	Misses	Rank
Ivan Galushkin	Sprint	22:41.4	5	40
Ivan Galushkin	Pursuit	33:27.3	7	25
Aleksei Kuznetcov	Sprint	22:14.1	4	25
Aleksei Kuznetcov	Pursuit	35:22.6	10	37

Girls

Athlete	Event	Final		
Athlete	Event	Time	Misses	Rank
Natalya Gerbulova	Sprint	18:14.5	1	5
Natalya Gerbulova	Pursuit	29:46.3	5	9
Uliana Kaysheva	Sprint	18:00.9	2	3rd place, bronze medalist(s)
Uliana Kaysheva	Pursuit	26:01.3	0	1st place, gold medalist(s)

Mixed

Athlete	Event	Final		
Athlete	Event	Time	Misses	Rank
Uliana Kaysheva; Natalya Gerbulova; Aleksei Kuznetcov; Ivan Galushkin	Mixed relay	DSQ		

== Bobsleigh ==
Russia qualified 2 athletes.

Boys

Athlete	Event	Final			
Athlete	Event	Run 1	Run 2	Total	Rank
Kirill Chigvinysev; Ivan Tarasov	Two-Boys	55.00	54.95	1:49.95	8

== Cross-country skiing ==
Russia qualified 4 athletes.

Boys

Athlete	Event	Final	
Athlete	Event	Time	Rank
Nikita Khabarov	10km classical	31:31.2	18
Alexander Selyaninov	10km classical	29:28.8	1st place, gold medalist(s)

Girls

Athlete	Event	Final	
Athlete	Event	Time	Rank
Anastasia Sedova	5km classical	14:18.0	1st place, gold medalist(s)
Alisa Zhambalova	5km classical	15:15.8	5

Sprint

Athlete	Event	Qualification		Quarterfinal		Semifinal		Final	
Athlete	Event	Total	Rank	Total	Rank	Total	Rank	Total	Rank
Nikita Khabarov	Boys' sprint	1:43.52	2 Q	1:51.9	5	did not advance			
Alexander Selyaninov	Boys' sprint	1:43.93	4 Q	1:49.5	2 Q	1:46.8	3 Q	1:45.1	3rd place, bronze medalist(s)
Anastasia Sedova	Girls' sprint	2:01.72	13 Q	2:01.5	3	did not advance			
Alisa Zhambalova	Girls' sprint	2:03.08	18 Q	2:03.0	4	did not advance			

== Curling ==
Russia qualified a team.

Roster

- Skip: Mikhail Vaskov
- Third: Anastasia Moskaleva
- Second: Alexandr Korshunov
- Lead: Marina Verenich

=== Mixed team ===
Final Round Robin Standings

Red Group	Skip	W	L
Sweden	Rasmus Wranå	6	1
Canada	Thomas Scoffin	5	2
Japan	Shingo Usui	4	3
Italy	Amos Mosaner	4	3
Great Britain	Duncan Menzies	3	4
Russia	Mikhail Vaskov	3	4
Austria	Mathias Genner	2	5
Germany	Daniel Rothballer	1	6

Round robin

Draw 1

Sheet A	1	2	3	4	5	6	7	8	Final
Italy (Mosaner)	1	0	3	0	0	3	0	X	7
Russia (Vaskov) 🔨	0	1	0	1	0	0	1	X	3

Draw 2

Sheet D	1	2	3	4	5	6	7	8	Final
Russia (Vaskov) 🔨	0	1	0	3	1	0	1	0	6
Germany (Rothballer)	0	0	2	0	0	1	0	1	4

Draw 3

Sheet B	1	2	3	4	5	6	7	8	Final
Sweden (Wranå) 🔨	1	0	1	0	1	1	0	1	5
Russia (Vaskov)	0	1	0	1	0	0	1	0	3

Draw 4

Sheet C	1	2	3	4	5	6	7	8	Final
Russia (Vaskov)	0	0	2	0	1	0	1	2	6
Japan (Usui) 🔨	0	1	0	3	0	1	0	0	5

Draw 5

Sheet B	1	2	3	4	5	6	7	8	Final
Russia (Vaskov) 🔨	0	0	0	0	1	0	X	X	1
Canada (Scoffin)	1	2	2	1	0	1	X	X	7

Draw 6

Sheet A	1	2	3	4	5	6	7	8	Final
Russia (Vaskov) 🔨	4	0	0	2	0	0	0	2	8
Austria (Genner)	0	1	1	0	1	1	1	0	5

Draw 7

Sheet D	1	2	3	4	5	6	7	8	Final
Great Britain (Menzies) 🔨	0	1	0	2	1	0	2	X	6
Russia (Vaskov)	1	0	1	0	0	1	0	X	3

=== Mixed doubles ===
Round of 32

Sheet D	1	2	3	4	5	6	7	8	Final
Mikhail Vaskov (RUS); Zuzana Hrůzová (CZE) 🔨	0	5	1	1	1	1	1	X	10
Marie Turmann (EST); Alessandro Zoppi (ITA)	3	0	0	0	0	0	0	X	3

Sheet A	1	2	3	4	5	6	7	8	Final
Elena Stern (SUI); Sander Rõuk (EST) 🔨	2	0	0	0	1	0	X	X	3
Korey Dropkin (USA); Marina Verenich (RUS)	0	2	1	4	0	6	X	X	13

Sheet C	1	2	3	4	5	6	7	8	Final
Robert-Kent Päll (EST); Emily Gray (CAN)	0	0	0	2	0	0	0	X	2
Anastasia Moskaleva (RUS); Tsukasa Horigome (JPN) 🔨	1	1	3	0	1	1	1	X	8

Sheet B	1	2	3	4	5	6	7	8	Final
Stine Haalien (NOR); Alexandr Korshunov (RUS) 🔨	0	0	0	0	1	0	0	X	1
Rasmus Wranå (SWE); Kerli Zirk (EST)	1	3	1	1	0	1	1	X	8

Round of 16

Sheet B	1	2	3	4	5	6	7	8	Final
Anastasia Moskaleva (RUS); Tsukasa Horigome (JPN) 🔨	1	0	2	2	1	1	X	X	7
Marek Černovský (CZE); Rachel Hannen (GBR)	0	1	0	0	0	0	X	X	1

Sheet C	1	2	3	4	5	6	7	8	Final
Korey Dropkin (USA); Marina Verenich (RUS) 🔨	1	0	5	0	1	2	1	X	10
Luke Steele (NZL); Johanna Heldin (SWE)	0	1	0	2	0	0	0	X	3

Sheet A	1	2	3	4	5	6	7	8	Final
Thomas Scoffin (CAN); Kelsi Heath (NZL)	0	1	0	1	1	0	2	0	5
Mikhail Vaskov (RUS); Zuzana Hrůzová (CZE) 🔨	2	0	1	0	0	1	0	2	6

Quarterfinals

Sheet A	1	2	3	4	5	6	7	8	9	Final
Martin Sesaker (NOR); Kim Eun-bi (KOR) 🔨	0	3	0	1	0	0	1	1	1	7
Anastasia Moskaleva (RUS); Tsukasa Horigome (JPN)	1	0	2	0	1	2	0	0	0	6

Sheet B	1	2	3	4	5	6	7	8	Final
Michael Brunner (SUI); Nicole Muskatewitz (GER)	0	0	1	2	1	0	3	1	8
Mikhail Vaskov (RUS); Zuzana Hrůzová (CZE) 🔨	1	1	0	0	0	1	0	0	3

Sheet D	1	2	3	4	5	6	7	8	Final
Korey Dropkin (USA); Marina Verenich (RUS)	1	2	2	0	4	0	0	X	9
Corryn Brown (CAN); Martin Reichel (AUT) 🔨	0	0	0	1	0	1	1	X	3

Semifinals

Sheet A	1	2	3	4	5	6	7	8	Final
Michael Brunner (SUI); Nicole Muskatewitz (GER)	1	1	0	2	0	3	0	X	7
Korey Dropkin (USA); Marina Verenich (RUS) 🔨	0	0	1	0	1	0	1	X	3

Bronze Medal Game

Sheet B	1	2	3	4	5	6	7	8	9	Final
Korey Dropkin (USA); Marina Verenich (RUS) 🔨	1	0	1	0	2	0	1	0	1	6
Yoo Min-hyeon (KOR); Mako Tamakuma (JPN)	0	1	0	1	0	1	0	2	0	5

== Figure skating ==
Russia qualified 11 athletes.

Boys

Athlete(s)	Event	SP		FS		Total	
Athlete(s)	Event	Points	Rank	Points	Rank	Points	Rank
Feodosi Efremenkov	Singles	54.70	2	108.76	5	163.46	3rd place, bronze medalist(s)

Girls

Athlete(s)	Event	SP		FS		Total	
Athlete(s)	Event	Points	Rank	Points	Rank	Points	Rank
Adelina Sotnikova	Singles	59.44	2	99.64	3	159.08	2nd place, silver medalist(s)
Elizaveta Tuktamisheva	Singles	61.83	1	111.27	1	173.10	1st place, gold medalist(s)

Pairs

Athlete(s)	Event	SP/OD		FS/FD		Total	
Athlete(s)	Event	Points	Rank	Points	Rank	Points	Rank
Anastasia Dolidze; Vadim Ivanov	Pair Skating	38.75	3	73.97	3	112.72	3rd place, bronze medalist(s)
Lina Fedorova; Maxim Miroshkin	Pair Skating	49.32	2	84.87	2	134.19	2nd place, silver medalist(s)
Maria Simonova; Dmitri Dragun	Ice Dancing	54.11	3	71.11	3	125.22	3rd place, bronze medalist(s)
Anna Yanovskaia; Sergey Mozgov	Ice Dancing	60.19	1	86.77	1	146.96	1st place, gold medalist(s)

Mixed

Athletes	Event	Boys'			Girls'			Ice Dance			Total	
Athletes	Event	Score	Rank	Points	Score	Rank	Points	Score	Rank	Points	Points	Rank
Team 1 Feodosi Efremenkov (RUS); Tina Stuerzinger (SUI); Millie Paterson/Edward Carstairs (GBR)	Team Trophy	117.13	1	8	73.46	5	4	44.02	8	1	13	5
Team 2 Yaroslav Paniot (UKR); Eveliina Viljanen (FIN); Maria Simonova/Dmitri Dragun (RUS)	Team Trophy	85.06	5	4	76.27	3	6	76.02	3	6	16	2nd place, silver medalist(s)
Team 5 Tino Olenius (FIN); Myrtel Saldeen Olofsson (SWE); Anna Yanovskaya/Sergey Mozgov (RUS)	Team Trophy	82.50	6	3	64.16	7	2	84.55	1	8	13	6

== Freestyle skiing ==
Russia qualified 2 athletes.

Ski Cross

Athlete	Event	Qualifying		1/4 finals	Semifinals	Final
Athlete	Event	Time	Rank	Rank	Rank	Rank
Maxim Vlasenko	Boys' ski cross	57.88	7	Cancelled		
Ksenia Maksimova	Girls' ski cross	1:01.82	8	Cancelled		

== Ice hockey ==
Russia qualified a boys' team.

Roster

- Stanislav Kondratyev
- Sergey Korobov
- Maxim Lazarev
- Alexander Mikulovich
- Eduard Nasybullin
- Arkhip Nekolenko
- Ivan Nikolishin
- Egor Orlov
- Rostislav Osipov
- Alexander Protapovich
- Dmitry Sergeev
- Evgeny Svechnikov
- Andrey Svetlakov
- Maxim Tretyak
- Egor Tsvetkov
- Daniil Vovchenko
- Ilia Zinovev

Preliminary round

Pos	Team	Pld	W	OTW	OTL	L	GF	GA	GD	Pts	Qualification
1	Russia	4	3	0	0	1	25	9	+16	9	Semifinals
2	Canada	4	2	1	0	1	20	7	+13	8	Semifinals
3	Finland	4	2	0	1	1	13	11	+2	7	Semifinals
4	United States	4	2	0	0	2	14	18	−4	6	Semifinals
5	Austria (H)	4	0	0	0	4	3	30	−27	0	

Source: IIHF
Rules for classification: 1) points; 2) head-to-head points; 3) head-to-head goal difference; 4) head-to-head number of goals scored; 5) result against closest best-ranked team outside tied teams; 6) result against second-best ranked team outside tied teams.
(H) Host

13 January; 14:45	Russia	4–3 (2–1, 2–1, 0–1)	Canada	Tyrolean Ice Arena; Attendance: 932

Game reference

Sergey Korobov
Goalies
Keven Bouchard
Referee:
(Sweden) Andreas Harnebring
Linesmen:
(Sweden) Daniel Persson
(Austria) Martin Smeibidlo

Protapovich (Tsvetkov) – 05:08	1–0
	1–1	05:33 – Pilon (Hicketts, Gardiner)
Tsvetkov – 11:56	2–1
Lazarev (Nikolishin) (SH) – 18:58	3–1
	3–2	21:37 – Brooks (Carrick)
Vovchenko (Nikolishin) – 26:38	4–2
	4–3	42:05 – Gardiner (Hicketts)

2 min
Penalties
4 min
23
Shots
29

15 January; 13:30	Finland	4–3 (0–2, 3–0, 1–1)	Russia	Tyrolean Ice Arena; Attendance: 783

Game reference

Kaapo Kähkönen
Goalies
Maxim Tretiak
Referee:
(Norway) Stian Halm
Linesmen:
(Germany) Benjamin Hoppe
(Austria) Martin Smeibidlo

	0–1	03:32 – Sergeev (PP)
	0–2	14:56 – Nikolishin (Nasybullin, Lazarev) (PP2)
Honkanen (PS) – 25:04	1–2
Kapanen (Tuulola, Sopanen) (PP) – 27:08	2–2
Hopponen (Kapanen, Honkanen) (PP) – 29:33	3–2
Kapanen – 30:41	4–2
	4–3	35:31 – Nikolishin (Lazarev, Svechnikov)

22 min
Penalties
10 min
21
Shots
32

16 January; 12:45	Russia	11–1 (0–1, 4–0, 7–0)	Austria	Tyrolean Ice Arena; Attendance: 1,274

Game reference

Sergey Korobov
Maxim Tretiak
Goalies
Thomas Stroj
Referee:
(Sweden) Andreas Harnebring
Linesmen:
(Slovenia) Tilen Pahor
(Sweden) Daniel Persson

	0–1	12:30 – Gaffal (Kraus) (PP)
Kondratyev (Vovchenko, Tsvetkov) – 16:13	1–1
Svetlakov (Vovchenko) – 19:33	2–1
Nikolishin (Nekolenko) – 25:51	3–1
Protapovich (Lazarev) (PP) – 27:55	4–1
Zinovev (PP) – 31:23	5–1
Svechnikov (Protapovich) – 33:22	6–1
Nikolishin (Zinovev) – 33:32	7–1
Protapovich (Lazarev, Orlov) (PP) – 35:34	8–1
Mikulovich (Nikolishin, Sergeev) – 40:04	9–1
Svechnikov (Lazarev, Nasybullin) (PP) – 42:41	10–1
Nikolishin (Zinovev, Nekolenko) – 43:52	11–1

8 min
Penalties
16 min
53
Shots
12

18 January; 16:15	United States	1–7 (0–2, 0–3, 1–2)	Russia	Tyrolean Ice Arena; Attendance: 2,124

Game reference

Edwin Minney
Logan Halladay
Goalies
Sergey Korobov
Referee:
(Germany) Simon Aicher
Linesmen:
(Germany) Benjamin Hoppe
(Sweden) Daniel Persson

	0–1	01:43 – Orlov (Svechnikov, Protapovich (PP)
	0–2	06:47 – Mikulovich (Nikolishin, Sergeev) (PP)
	0–3	16:24 – Kondratyev (Svetlakov)
	0–4	19:32 – Svechnikov (Lazarev, Protapovich) (PP)
	0–5	21:58 – Lazarev (Svechnikov)
Fiegl (MacInnis, Wegwerth) – 38:17	1–5
	1–6	40:30 – Lazarev (Svechnikov)
	1–7	43:32 – Nasybullin (Orlov, Protapovich) (PP)

16 min
Penalties
4 min
15
Shots
30

Semifinal

20 January; 14:15	Russia	5–2 (1–0, 1–0, 3–2)	United States	Tyrolean Ice Arena; Attendance: 1,632

Game reference

Sergey Korobov
Goalies
Logan Halladay
Referee:
(Sweden) Andreas Harnebring
Linesmen:
(Belarus) Andrei Haurylenka
(Sweden) Daniel Persson

Orlov (Nasybullin, Protapovich) (PP) – 02:06	1–0
Nikolishin (Nekolenko) – 28:01	2–0
Zinovev (Mikulovich, Nikolishin) – 31:03	3–0
Nekolenko (Nikolishin, Sergeev) – 32:49	4–0
	4–1	40:06 – Wegwerth (Eichel)
	4–2	41:22 – Eichel (Glover) (PP, EA)
Svechnikov (ENG) – 44:37	5–2

14 min
Penalties
8 min
16
Shots
32

Gold medal game

22 January; 12:15	(silver) Russia	1–2 GWS (1–0, 0–0, 0–1) (OT: 0–0) (SO: 0–1)	Finland	Tyrolean Ice Arena; Attendance: 3,008

Game reference
Sergey Korobov	Goalies	Kaapo Kähkönen	Referee: (Germany) Simon Aicher; Linesmen: (Belarus) Andrei Haurylenka (Sweden) Daniel Persson
Zinovev – 08:35 / 1–0; / 1–1 / 43:58 – Hopponen (EA)			Referee: (Germany) Simon Aicher; Linesmen: (Belarus) Andrei Haurylenka (Sweden) Daniel Persson
Lazarev (miss); Nikolishin (miss)	Shootout	Honkanen; Kapanen	Referee: (Germany) Simon Aicher; Linesmen: (Belarus) Andrei Haurylenka (Sweden) Daniel Persson
24 min	Penalties	26 min	Referee: (Germany) Simon Aicher; Linesmen: (Belarus) Andrei Haurylenka (Sweden) Daniel Persson
28	Shots	25	Referee: (Germany) Simon Aicher; Linesmen: (Belarus) Andrei Haurylenka (Sweden) Daniel Persson

== Luge ==
Russia qualified 6 athletes.

Boys

Athlete	Event	Final			
Athlete	Event	Run 1	Run 2	Total	Rank
Maksim Aravin	Boys' singles	40.203	40.148	1:20.351	13
Alexander Stepichev	Boys' singles	40.111	40.217	1:20.328	11
Yury Kalinin; Sergey Belyaev	Boys' doubles	43.000	42.946	1:25.946	4

Girls

Athlete	Event	Final			
Athlete	Event	Run 1	Run 2	Total	Rank
Victoria Demchenko	Girls' singles	43.006	40.478	1:23.484	20
Ekaterina Katnikova	Girls' singles	40.441	40.502	1:20.943	7

Team

Athlete	Event	Final				
Athlete	Event	Boys'	Girls'	Doubles	Total	Rank
Victoria Demchenko; Alexander Stepichev; Yury Kalinin; Sergey Belyaev	Mixed Team Relay	45.336	46.911	47.434	2:19.681	4

== Mixed sports ==
Mixed

Athlete	Event	Final		
Athlete	Event	Time	Misses	Rank
Uliana Kaysheva; Anastasia Sedova; Ivan Galushkin; Alexander Selyaninov	Cross-Country-Biathlon Mixed Relay	1:05:22.5	2+9	2nd place, silver medalist(s)

== Nordic combined ==
Russia qualified 1 athlete.

Boys

Athlete	Event	Ski jumping		Cross-country		Final	
Athlete	Event	Points	Rank	Deficit	Ski Time	Total Time	Rank
Roman Terekhin	Boys' individual	85.2	15	3:29	28:56.5	32:25.5	14

== Short track ==
Russia qualified 2 athletes.

Boys

Athlete	Event	Quarterfinals		Semifinals		Finals	
Athlete	Event	Time	Rank	Time	Rank	Time	Rank
Denis Ayrapetyan	Boys' 500 metres	45.836	2 Q	45.025	3 qB	45.902	2
Denis Ayrapetyan	Boys' 1000 metres	1:47.810	3 qCD	1:33.689	2 qC	PEN	

Girls

Athlete	Event	Quarterfinals		Semifinals		Finals	
Athlete	Event	Time	Rank	Time	Rank	Time	Rank
Anna Gamorina	Girls' 500 metres	46.382	2 Q	1:07.177	4 qB	PEN	
Anna Gamorina	Girls' 1000 metres	1:50.594	3 qCD	1:44.645	1 qC	1:38.042	1

Mixed

Athlete	Event	Semifinals		Finals	
Athlete	Event	Time	Rank	Time	Rank
Team A Shim Suk-hee (KOR); Yoann Martinez (FRA); Melanie Brantner (AUT); Denis Ayrapetyan (RUS)	Mixed Team Relay	4:21.668	2 Q	4:26.352	3rd place, bronze medalist(s)
Team H Anna Gamorina (RUS); Hyo Jun Lim (KOR); Aafke Soet (NED); Michal Prokop (CZE)	Mixed Team Relay	4:26.027	2 Q	PEN	

== Skeleton ==
Russia qualified 3 athletes.

Boys

Athlete	Event	Final			
Athlete	Event	Run 1	Run 2	Total	Rank
Valeriy Myshaev	Boys' individual	58.26	59.45	1:57.71	6

Girls

Athlete	Event	Final			
Athlete	Event	Run 1	Run 2	Total	Rank
Anastasia Shlapak	Girls' individual	CAN	58.73	58.73	4
Elizaveta Zubkova	Girls' individual	CAN	59.28	59.28	6

== Ski jumping ==
Russia qualified 2 athletes.

Boys

Athlete	Event	1st Jump		2nd Jump		Overall	
Athlete	Event	Distance	Points	Distance	Points	Points	Rank
Yury Samsonov	Boys' individual	63.5m	96.7	60.5m	90.0	186.7	18

Girls

Athlete	Event	1st Jump		2nd Jump		Overall	
Athlete	Event	Distance	Points	Distance	Points	Points	Rank
Anastasia Veshchikova	Girls' individual	58.0m	83.5	59.0m	86.4	169.9	10

Team w/Nordic Combined

Athlete	Event	1st Round	2nd Round	Total	Rank
Anastasia Veshchikova; Roman Terekhin; Yury Samsonov	Mixed Team	180.5	178.1	358.6	13

== Snowboarding ==
Russia qualified 3 athletes.

Boys

Athlete	Event	Qualifying			Semifinal			Final		
Athlete	Event	Run 1	Run 2	Rank	Run 1	Run 2	Rank	Run 1	Run 2	Rank
Nikita Avtaneev	Boys' halfpipe	66.00	72.50	3 Q				74.25	70.25	7
Ivan Kardonov	Boys' halfpipe	54.00	54.50	9 q	55.35	57.50	9	did not advance		
Ivan Kardonov	Boys' slopestyle	33.75	34.50	14				did not advance		

Girls

Athlete	Event	Qualifying			Semifinal			Final		
Athlete	Event	Run 1	Run 2	Rank	Run 1	Run 2	Rank	Run 1	Run 2	Rank
Ekaterina Prusakova	Girls' halfpipe	DNS			did not advance					

== Speed skating ==
Russia qualified 4 athletes.

Boys

Athlete	Event	Race 1	Race 2	Total	Rank
Vasiliy Pudushkin	Boys' 500 m	38.92	39.16	78.08	4
Vasiliy Pudushkin	Boys' 1500 m			2:03.08	8
Vasiliy Pudushkin	Boys' Mass Start			7:12.83	3rd place, bronze medalist(s)
Mikhail Kazelin	Boys' 1500 m			2:03.42	10
Mikhail Kazelin	Boys' 3000 m			4:19.25	6
Mikhail Kazelin	Boys' Mass Start			7:14.42	7

Girls

Athlete	Event	Race 1	Race 2	Total	Rank
Marina Salnikova	Girls' 500 m	82.08	43.34	125.42	15
Marina Salnikova	Girls' 1500 m			2:14.53	6
Marina Salnikova	Girls' Mass Start			6:07.63	10
Elizaveta Kazelina	Girls' 1500 m			2:12.90	5
Elizaveta Kazelina	Girls' 3000 m			4:44.45	4
Elizaveta Kazelina	Girls' Mass Start			6:01.47	4

== See also ==
- Russia at the 2012 Summer Olympics
