= Audrey McManiman =

Canadian snowboarder (born 1995)

Personal information
- Born: 24 January 1995 (age 31) Saint-Ambroise-de-Kildare, Quebec, Canada

Sport
- Country: Canada
- Sport: Snowboarding
- Event(s): Snowboard cross, halfpipe (former), slopestyle (former)
Medal record
Winter Universiade
Bronze medal – third place	2019 Krasnoyarsk	Snowboard cross
Winter Youth Olympics
Gold medal – first place	2012 Innsbruck	Slopestyle

Audrey McManiman (born 24 January 1995) is a Canadian snowboarder who competes internationally in the snowboard cross discipline, and formerly in the freestyle events.

== Career ==
=== Freestyle ===
McManiman made her debut for Canada at the inaugural Winter Youth Olympics in 2012. McManiman won the gold medal in the slopestyle event. MacManiman would compete in a few World Cup events between 2012 and 2015, topped off by competing at the 2015 World Championships. In January 2016, McManiman had a serious crash in training and after recovery switched her focus to competing in the snowboard cross discipline.

=== Snowboard cross ===
At the 2019 Winter Universiade in Krasnoyarsk, McManiman won bronze in the women's snowboard cross event.

In January 2022, McManiman was named to Canada's 2022 Olympic team in the snowboard cross event.
