= Argentina at the 2012 Winter Youth Olympics =

- IOC code: ARG
- NOC: Comité Olímpico Argentino
- Website: www.coarg.org.ar (in Spanish)

in Innsbruck
- Competitors: 5 in 3 sports
- Flag bearer: Ramiro Fregonese
- Medals: Gold 0 Silver 0 Bronze 0 Total 0

Winter Youth Olympics appearances (overview)
- 2012; 2016; 2020; 2024

Argentina competed at the 2012 Winter Youth Olympics in Innsbruck, Austria. The Argentine team was made up of five athletes in three sports.

== Alpine skiing ==
Argentina qualified a team of one boys and one girl.

=== Boys ===
Athlete	Event	Final			
Athlete	Event	Run 1	Run 2	Total	Rank
Ramiro Fregonese	Giant slalom	1:00.48	DNF		
Ramiro Fregonese	Super-G			1:08.48	25
Ramiro Fregonese	Combined	1:06.72	38.89	1:45.61	16

=== Girls ===
Athlete	Event	Final			
Athlete	Event	Run 1	Run 2	Total	Rank
Delfina Costantini	Slalom	DNF			
Delfina Costantini	Giant slalom	1:00.96	DNF		
Delfina Costantini	Super-G			1:10.50	22
Delfina Costantini	Combined	1:09.26	39.83	1:49.09	20

== Cross country skiing ==
Argentina qualified one boy in cross country skiing.

=== Boys ===
Athlete	Event	Final	
Athlete	Event	Time	Rank
Alejo Hlopec	10 km classical	40:33.8	47

=== Sprint ===
Athlete	Event	Qualification		Quarterfinal		Semifinal		Final	
Athlete	Event	Total	Rank	Total	Rank	Total	Rank	Total	Rank
Alejo Hlopec	Boys' sprint	2:09.30	47	did not advance					

== Freestyle skiing ==
Argentina qualified one boy and one girl for the ski cross events.

=== Ski Cross ===
Boy

Athlete	Event	Qualifying		1/4 finals	Semifinals	Final
Athlete	Event	Time	Rank	Rank	Rank	Rank
Thomas Rivara	Boys' ski cross	59.00	10	Cancelled		

Girl

Athlete	Event	Qualifying		1/4 finals	Semifinals	Final
Athlete	Event	Time	Rank	Rank	Rank	Rank
Manuela Roncallo	Girls' ski cross	1:01.67	7	Cancelled		

== See also ==
- Argentina at the 2012 Summer Olympics
