= Chile at the 2012 Winter Youth Olympics =

- IOC code: CHI
- NOC: Chilean Olympic Committee
- Website: www.coc.org.co (in Spanish)

in Innsbruck
- Competitors: 5 in 3 sports
- Flag bearer: Sebastian Echeverría
- Medals: Gold 0 Silver 0 Bronze 0 Total 0

Winter Youth Olympics appearances
- 2012; 2016; 2020; 2024

Chile competed at the 2012 Winter Youth Olympics in Innsbruck, Austria. The Chilean team consisted of 5 athletes competed in 3 different sports.

== Alpine skiing ==
Chile qualified one boy and girl in alpine skiing.

Boy

Athlete	Event	Final			
Athlete	Event	Run 1	Run 2	Total	Rank
Sebastian Echeverría	Slalom	43.52	DNF		
Sebastian Echeverría	Giant slalom	58.13	DNF		
Sebastian Echeverría	Super-G			1:07.59	21
Sebastian Echeverría	Combined	1:06.61	40.12	1:46.73	21

Girl

Athlete	Event	Final			
Athlete	Event	Run 1	Run 2	Total	Rank
Macarena Montesinos	Slalom	DNF			
Macarena Montesinos	Giant slalom	1:03.67	DNF		

== Freestyle skiing ==
=== Ski cross ===
Chile qualified one boy and girl in the ski cross competitions.

Boy

Athlete	Event	Qualifying		1/4 finals	Semifinals	Final
Athlete	Event	Time	Rank	Rank	Rank	Rank
Juan Pablo Casas-Cordero	Boys' ski cross	59.46	13	Cancelled		

Girl

Athlete	Event	Qualifying		1/4 finals	Semifinals	Final
Athlete	Event	Time	Rank	Rank	Rank	Rank
Elisa Guerrero	Girls' ski cross	1:03.82	11	Cancelled		

== Snowboarding ==
Chile qualified one boy in snowboarding.

Boy

Athlete	Event	Qualifying			Semifinal			Final		
Athlete	Event	Run 1	Run 2	Rank	Run 1	Run 2	Rank	Run 1	Run 2	Rank
Andre Escobar	Boys' slopestyle	43.75	66.75	8 Q				32.75	60.00	9

== See also ==
- Chile at the 2012 Summer Olympics
