= Kim Dong-woo (skier) =

South Korean alpine skier (born 1995)

Kim Dong-woo OLY
Personal information
- Nationality: South Korean
- Born: 1 June 1995 (age 31) South Korea
- Education: Korea National Sport University

Sport
- Country: South Korea
- Sport: Alpine skiing
- Coached by: Shin Bok-soo

Korean name
- Hangul: 김동우
- RR: Gim Dongu
- MR: Kim Tongu

Kim Dong-woo (born 1 June 1995) is a South Korean alpine skier. Kim competed at the 2018 Winter Olympics for South Korea.
