= Rokas Zaveckas =

Lithuanian alpine skier (born 1996)

Personal information
- Born: 15 April 1996 (age 30) Vilnius, Lithuania
- Height: 1.82 m (6 ft 0 in)
- Weight: 81 kg (179 lb)

Rokas Zaveckas (born 15 April 1996 in Vilnius, Lithuania) is a Lithuanian alpine and freestyle skier.

In 2012 he competed at 2012 Winter Youth Olympics: 24th in slalom, 28th in super combined, 29th in giant slalom and 35th in Super-G.

In 2014 Zaveckas was selected to represent Lithuania in 2014 Winter Olympic Games.

In 2023 Zaveckas become first Lithuanian to compete at the FIS Freestyle Ski World Championships 2023.
