= Dmytro Mytsak =

Ukrainian alpine skier (born 1995)

Personal information
- Born: 8 November 1995 (age 30) Boryslav, Ukraine
Medal record
Alpine skiing
Representing Ukraine

Dmytro Mytsak (born 8 November 1995) is an alpine skier from Ukraine. He competed for Ukraine at the 2014 Winter Olympics in the alpine skiing events.
