= Adam Lamhamedi =

Moroccan-Canadian alpine skier

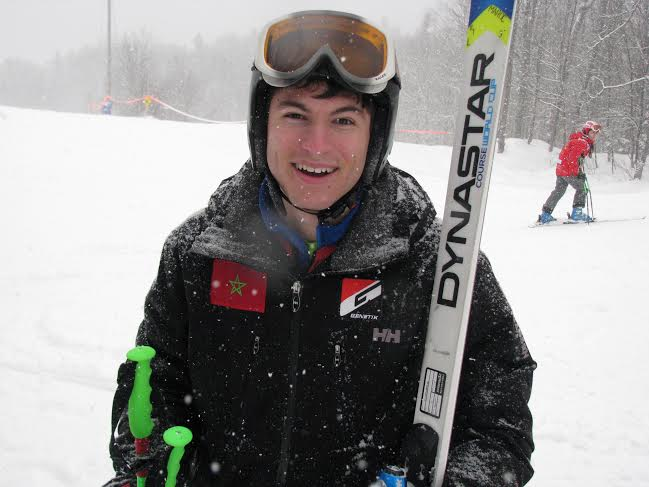

Personal information
- Born: 22 April 1995 (age 31) Quebec City, Quebec, Canada
Medal record
Alpine skiing
Representing Morocco
Winter Youth Olympic Games
Gold medal – first place	2012 Innsbruck	Super-G

Adam Lamhamedi (born 22 April 1995 in Quebec City, Quebec) is a Moroccan-Canadian alpine skier who has competed since 2010 on the FIS circuit. Lamhamedi was born in Canada, and competed for Morocco at the 2014 Winter Olympics in Sochi, Russia.

== Early life ==
Adam Lamhamedi was born on 22 April 1995 in Quebec City to a Moroccan father and a Canadian mother. He began skiing in childhood, winning his first competition at the age of eight. In 2011, he made the decision to compete on behalf of his father's country rather than Canada, both internationally and locally on the provincial ski circuit in Quebec.

== Skiing career ==
Lamhamedi's decision to represent Morocco instead of Canada meant that rather than needing good results in the provincial competitions to qualify internationally, he instead competes directly on behalf of the African nation since 2010. This included his selection for the inaugural Winter Youth Olympics in Innsbruck, Austria, where he was the gold medallist in the first ever boy's super-G competition. This made Lamhamedi the first person representing an African nation to win a medal at Winter Olympic Games of any type. During the course of that year, he was ranked first in Canada for giant slalom and second in slalom.

In the following ski season, he secured enough points to qualify for the 2014 Winter Olympics in Sochi, Russia. He was selected as one of the two person delegation, with his brother Sami also attending the Games as a substitute. He finished in 47th position in the men's giant slalom, but did not finish in the slalom.

Olympic Games
Preceded by Wiam Dislam	Flag Bearer for Morocco; Sochi 2014	Succeeded by Abdelkebir Ouaddar
