= Sandro Simonet =

Swiss alpine skier (born 1995)

Personal information
- Born: 5 July 1995 (age 31)
- Height: 1.93 m (6 ft 4 in)
- Website: sandrosimonet.ch

Skiing career
- Sport: Alpine skiing
- Club: Lenzerheide-Valbella
- Disciplines: Slalom, Combined
- World Cup debut: 13 November 2016 (age 21)

Olympics
- Teams: 0

World Championships
- Teams: 2 − (2019, 2021)
- Medals: 1 (team) (1 gold)

World Cup
- Seasons: 5 − (2017–2021)
- Wins: 0
- Podiums: 1 – (1 SL)
- Overall titles: 0 – (83rd in 2019)
- Discipline titles: 0 – (19th in AC, 2019)
Medal record
Men's alpine skiing
Representing Switzerland
World Championships
Gold medal – first place	2019 Åre	Team event
Junior World Championships
Gold medal – first place	2017 Åre	Slalom

Sandro Simonet (born 5 July 1995) is a Swiss World Cup alpine ski racer and competes primarily in slalom. He made his World Cup debut in November 2016 and gained his first podium in January 2021, a third place in slalom at Chamonix, France.

Simonet has competed at two World Championships, and won a gold medal in the team event in 2019.

== World Cup results ==
=== Season standings ===
Season	Age	Overall	Slalom	Giant slalom	Super-G	Downhill	Combined
2017	21	156	60	—	—	—	—
2018	22	105	35	—	—	—	—
2019	23	83	36	—	—	—	19
2020	24	102	36	—	—	—	—
2021	25	71	27	—	—	—	—

Standings through 1 March 2021

=== Race podiums ===
- 1 podium – (1 SL); 2 top tens

Season	Date	Location	Discipline	Position
2021	31 Jan 2021	Chamonix, France	Slalom	3rd

== World Championship results ==
Year	Age	Slalom	Giant slalom	Super-G	Downhill	Combined	Parallel	Team event
2019	23	—	—	—	—	26	-->data-sort-value="" style="background: var(--background-color-interactive, #ececec); color: var(--color-base, inherit); vertical-align: middle; text-align: center; " class="table-na" | —N/a	1
2021	25	—	—	—	—	—	—	4
