= Finland at the 2012 Winter Youth Olympics =

- IOC code: FIN
- NOC: Finnish Olympic Committee
- Website: www.noc.fi

in Innsbruck
- Competitors: 42 in 10 sports
- Flag bearer: Katri Lylynperä
- Medals Ranked 13th: Gold 2 Silver 2 Bronze 0 Total 4

Winter Youth Olympics appearances
- 2012; 2016; 2020; 2024

Finland competed at the 2012 Winter Youth Olympics in Innsbruck, Austria. The Finnish team consisted of 42 athletes competing in 10 different sports.

== Medalists ==
Medal	Name	Sport	Event	Date
Gold	Niki Lehikoinen	Freestyle Skiing	Boys' ski cross	21 Jan
Gold	Finland Boy's U16 ice hockey team: Juuso Kannel; Markus Haapanen; Jaakko Hälli; Joni Tuulola; Jere Rouhiainen; Eetu Sopanen; Otto Tolvanen; Waltteri Hopponen; Manu Honkanen; Antti Kauppinen; Kasperi Kapanen; Miikka Pitkänen; Joel Kiviranta; Alex Levanen; Otto Nieminen; Jonne Yliniemi; Kaapo Kähkönen	Ice hockey	Boys' competition	22 Jan
Silver	Lauri Kivari	Freestyle skiing	Boys' halfpipe	15 Jan
Silver	Ilkka Herola	Nordic combined	Individual	15 Jan

== Alpine skiing ==
Boys

Athlete	Event	Final			
Athlete	Event	Run 1	Run 2	Total	Rank
Juho Sattanen	Slalom	41.75	41.38	1:23.13	12
Juho Sattanen	Giant slalom	59.12	1:01.98	2:01.10	25
Juho Sattanen	Super-G			1:08.86	26
Juho Sattanen	Combined	1:06.08	DNF		

Girls

Athlete	Event	Final			
Athlete	Event	Run 1	Run 2	Total	Rank
Olivia Schoultz	Slalom	46.09	41.86	1:27.95	13
Olivia Schoultz	Giant slalom	1:02.51	1:02.37	2:04.88	25
Olivia Schoultz	Super-G			1:10.27	21
Olivia Schoultz	Combined	1:11.82	41.14	1:52.96	24

== Biathlon ==
Boys

Athlete	Event	Final		
Athlete	Event	Time	Misses	Rank
Heikki Laitinen	Sprint	22:14.3	2	27
Heikki Laitinen	Pursuit	33:30.0	4	28
Antti Repo	Sprint	22:30.0	5	36
Antti Repo	Pursuit	33:51.0	6	30

Girls

Athlete	Event	Final		
Athlete	Event	Time	Misses	Rank
Jenny Ingman	Sprint	20:24.6	3	30
Jenny Ingman	Pursuit	33:42.2	5	24
Erika Janka	Sprint	20:28.8	1	31
Erika Janka	Pursuit	35.11.0	8	36

Mixed

Athlete	Event	Final		
Athlete	Event	Time	Misses	Rank
Jenny Ingman; Erika Janka; Heikki Laitinen; Antti Repo	Mixed relay	1:20:54.2	4+19	16
Jenny Ingman; Katri Lylynperä; Antti Repo; Joonas Sarkkinen	Cross-Country-Biathlon Mixed Relay	1:12:28.6	5+10	19

== Cross country skiing ==
Boys

Athlete	Event	Final	
Athlete	Event	Time	Rank
Joona Joensuu	10km classical	32:24.3	25
Joonas Sarkkinen	10km classical	30:21.7	5

Girls

Athlete	Event	Final	
Athlete	Event	Time	Rank
Katri Lylynperä	5km classical	16:18.9	14
Leena Nurmi	5km classical	16:34.6	18

Sprint

Athlete	Event	Qualification		Quarterfinal		Semifinal		Final	
Athlete	Event	Total	Rank	Total	Rank	Total	Rank	Total	Rank
Joona Joensuu	Boys' sprint	1:46.44	10 Q	1:49.4	4	did not advance			
Joonas Sarkkinen	Boys' sprint	1:47.75	19 Q	1:51.6	4	did not advance			
Katri Lylynperä	Girls' sprint	2:01.21	10 Q	1:59.4	2 Q	1:57.8	2 Q	1:58.9	5
Leena Nurmi	Girls' sprint	2:01.57	12 Q	2:00.7	4 Q	2:03.3	5	did not advance	

Mixed

Athlete	Event	Final		
Athlete	Event	Time	Misses	Rank
Jenny Ingman; Katri Lylynperä; Antti Repo; Joonas Sarkkinen	Cross-Country-Biathlon Mixed Relay	1:12:28.6	5+10	19

== Figure skating ==
Boys

Athlete(s)	Event	SP/OD		FS/FD		Total	
Athlete(s)	Event	Points	Rank	Points	Rank	Points	Rank
Tino Olenius	Singles	46.03	8	81.09	12	127.12	11

Girls

Athlete(s)	Event	SP/OD		FS/FD		Total	
Athlete(s)	Event	Points	Rank	Points	Rank	Points	Rank
Eveliina Viljanen	Singles	29.73	16	71.37	10	101.10	12

Mixed

Athletes	Event	Boys'			Girls'			Ice Dance			Total	
Athletes	Event	Score	Rank	Points	Score	Rank	Points	Score	Rank	Points	Points	Rank
Team 2 Yaroslav Paniot (UKR); Eveliina Viljanen (FIN); Maria Simonova/Dmitri Dragun (RUS)	Team Trophy	85.06	5	4	76.27	3	6	76.02	3	6	16	2nd place, silver medalist(s)
Team 5 Tino Olenius (FIN); Myrtel Saldeen Olofsson (SWE); Anna Yanovskaya/Sergey Mozgov (RUS)	Team Trophy	82.50	6	3	64.16	7	2	84.55	1	8	13	6

== Freestyle skiing ==
While formally listed to compete Wilma Löfgren was not registered in any events.

Ski Cross

Athlete	Event	Qualifying		1/4 finals	Semifinals	Final
Athlete	Event	Time	Rank	Rank	Rank	Rank
Niki Lehikoinen	Boys' ski cross	56.15	1st place, gold medalist(s)	Cancelled		

Ski Half-Pipe

Athlete	Event	Qualifying		Final	
Athlete	Event	Points	Rank	Points	Rank
Lauri Kivari	Boys' ski half-pipe	75.50	4 Q	90.00	2nd place, silver medalist(s)

== Ice hockey ==
Boys

- Markus Haapanen
- Jaakko Hälli
- Manu Honkanen
- Waltteri Hopponen
- Kaapo Kähkönen
- Juuso Kannel
- Kasperi Kapanen
- Antti Kauppinen
- Joel Kiviranta
- Alex Levanen
- Otto Nieminen
- Miikka Pitkänen
- Jere Rouhiainen
- Eetu Sopanen
- Otto Tolvanen
- Joni Tuulola
- Jonne Yliniemi

Legend
Advance to the Semifinals

Group A

Legend
Teams to Playoffs

Team	GP	W	OTW	OTL	L	GF	GA	Diff	PTS
Russia	4	3	0	0	1	25	9	+16	9
Canada	4	2	1	0	1	20	7	+13	8
Finland	4	2	0	1	1	13	11	+2	7
United States	4	2	0	0	2	14	18	–4	6
Austria	4	0	0	0	4	3	30	–27	0

January 13, 2012; 10:15	Austria	0–3 (0–0, 0–0, 0–3)	Finland	Tyrolean Ice Arena; Attendance: 520

Game reference

Thomas Stroj
Goalies
Juuso Kannel
Referee:
(Germany) Simon Aicher
Linesmen:
(Belarus) Andrei Haurylenka
(Germany) Benjamin Hoppe

0–1	30:22 – K. Kapanen (W. Hopponen)
0–2	32:05 – W. Hopponen (M. Honkanen, K. Kapanen)
0–3	44:40 – J. Kiviranta (E. Sopanen, J. Kannel) (SH) (ENG)

10 min
Penalties
2 min
8
Shots
44

January 15, 2012; 13:30	Finland	4–3 (0–2, 3–0, 1–1)	Russia	Tyrolean Ice Arena; Attendance: 783

Game reference

Kaapo Kahkonen
Goalies
Maxim Tretyak
Referee:
(Norway) Stian Halm
Linesmen:
(Germany) Benjamin Hoppe
(Austria) Martin Smeibidlo

	0–1	3:32 – D. Sergeev (PP)
	0–2	14:56 – I. Nikolishin (E. Nasybullin, M. Lazarev) (PP2)
M. Honkanen (PS) – 25:04	1–2
K. Kapanen (J. Tuulola, E. Sopanen) (PP) – 27:08	2–2
W. Hopponen (K. Kapanen, M. Honkanen) (PP) – 29:33	3–2
K. Kapanen – 30:41	4–2
	4–3	35:31 – I. Nikolishin (M. Lazarev, E. Svechnikov)

22 min
Penalties
10 min
21
Shots
32

January 17, 2012; 15:45	Finland	4–5 (1–0, 2–3, 1–2)	United States	Tyrolean Ice Arena; Attendance: 1,824

Game reference

Juuso Kannel
Goalies
Edwin Minney
Referee:
(Latvia) Andris Ansons
Linesmen:
(Slovenia) Tilen Pahor
(Austria) Martin Smeibidlo

J. Kiviranta (W. Hopponen, J. Tuulola) – 12:16	1–0
	1–1	16:31 – A. Baughman (N. Schmaltz)
J. Tuulola (J. Kiviranta, M. Pitkanen) – 19:45	2–1
	2–2	23:10 – J. Glover (R. Bliss) (PP)
A. Kauppinen (W. Hopponen, A. Levanen) – 24:36	3–2
	3–3	27:47 – B. Clarke (K. Kerr)
	3–4	31:01 – N. Schmaltz (R. Bliss, J. Fiegl)
	3–5	32:15 – R. MacInnis (S. Gersich, N. Magyar)
K. Kapanen (M. Haapanen) – 41:45	4–5

10 min
Penalties
26 min
29
Shots
32

January 18, 2012; 11:45	Canada	3–2 GWS (0–0, 2–1, 0–1) (OT: 0–0) (SO: 2–1)	Finland	Tyrolean Ice Arena; Attendance: 1,261

Game reference

Keven Bouchard
Goalies
Kaapo Kahkonen
Referee:
(Sweden) Andreas Harnebring
Linesmen:
(Belarus) Andrei Haurylenka
(Austria) Martin Smeibidlo

A. Brooks (R. Duke) – 15:11	1–0
	1–1	21:05 – J. Kiviranta (M. Pitkanen)
E. Cornel (R. Gropp, J. Hicketts) – 22:01	2–1
	2–2	36:42 – J. Kiviranta (M. Pitkanen, O. Nieminen)

E. Cornel (miss)
R. Gropp
R. Gardiner
Shootout
(miss) J. Kiviranta
K. Kapanen
(miss) M. Honkanen
6 min
Penalties
8 min
27
Shots
25

=== Semifinals ===
January 20, 2012; 18:45	Canada	1–2 (1–1, 0–0, 0–1)	Finland	Tyrolean Ice Arena; Attendance: 1,426

Game reference

Keven Bouchard
Goalies
Kaapo Kahkonen
Referee:
(Germany) Simon Aicher
Linesmen:
(Germany) Benjamin Hoppe
(Slovenia) Tilen Pahor

J. Carrick (R. Gardiner, E. Cornel) (PP) – 4:17	1–0
	1–1	11:29 – O. Nieminen (J. Kiviranta, M. Pitkanen)
	1–2	40:26 – E. Sopanen (O. Nieminen, M. Pitkanen) (PP)

8 min
Penalties
10 min
17
Shots
19

=== Gold medal game ===
January 22, 2012; 12:15	Russia	1–2 GWS (1–0, 0–0, 0–1) (OT 0–0) (SO: 0–1)	Finland	Tyrolean Ice Arena; Attendance: 3,008

Game reference
Sergey Korobov	Goalies	Kaapo Kähkönen	Referee: (Germany) Simon Aicher; Linesmen: (Belarus) Andrei Haurylenka (Sweden) Daniel Persson
I. Zinovev - 8:35 / 1-0; / 1–1 / 43:58 - W. Hopponen			Referee: (Germany) Simon Aicher; Linesmen: (Belarus) Andrei Haurylenka (Sweden) Daniel Persson
M. Lazarev; I. Nikolishin	Shootout	M. Honkanen; K. Kapanen	Referee: (Germany) Simon Aicher; Linesmen: (Belarus) Andrei Haurylenka (Sweden) Daniel Persson
24 min	Penalties	26 min	Referee: (Germany) Simon Aicher; Linesmen: (Belarus) Andrei Haurylenka (Sweden) Daniel Persson
28	Shots	25	Referee: (Germany) Simon Aicher; Linesmen: (Belarus) Andrei Haurylenka (Sweden) Daniel Persson

Final rank: (gold)

== Nordic combined ==
Boys

Athlete	Event	Ski jumping		Cross-country		Final	
Athlete	Event	Points	Rank	Deficit	Ski Time	Total Time	Rank
Ilkka Herola	Boys' individual	130.2	4	0:29	26:05.2	26:34.2	2nd place, silver medalist(s)

== Ski jumping ==
Boys

Athlete	Event	1st Jump		2nd Jump		Overall	
Athlete	Event	Distance	Points	Distance	Points	Points	Rank
Miika Ylipulli	Boys' individual	73.0m	124.5	72.5m	122.3	246.8	5

Girls

Athlete	Event	1st Jump		2nd Jump		Overall	
Athlete	Event	Distance	Points	Distance	Points	Points	Rank
Jenny Rautionaho	Girls' individual	62.5m	96.3	63.5m	98.7	195.0	7

Team w/Nordic Combined

Athlete	Event	1st Round	2nd Round	Total	Rank
Jenny Rautionaho; Ilkka Herola; Miika Ylipulli	Mixed Team	276.2	302.1	578.3	4

== Speed skating ==
Boys

Athlete	Event	Race 1	Race 2	Total	Rank
Lasse Ahonen	Boys' 500 m	42.59	42.16	84.75	15
Tuomas Rahnasto	Boys' 500 m	41.59	41.21	82.80	12
Tuomas Rahnasto	Boys' 3000 m			4:44.44	15
Tuomas Rahnasto	Boys' Mass Start			LAP	

== Snowboarding ==
Boys

Athlete	Event	Qualifying			Semifinal			Final		
Athlete	Event	Run 1	Run 2	Rank	Run 1	Run 2	Rank	Run 1	Run 2	Rank
Kalle Järvilehto	Boys' halfpipe	51.25	53.75	8 q	54.00	37.50	10	did not advance		
Kalle Järvilehto	Boys' slopestyle	69.00	43.50	7 Q				32.00	56.00	11
Tuomas Pohjonen	Boys' halfpipe	47.25	45.00	12	did not advance					
Tuomas Pohjonen	Boys' slopestyle	74.00	76.25	4 Q				80.25	46.50	7

Girls

Athlete	Event	Qualifying			Semifinal			Final		
Athlete	Event	Run 1	Run 2	Rank	Run 1	Run 2	Rank	Run 1	Run 2	Rank
Hanna Ehtonen	Girls' halfpipe	18.75	21.75	13	did not advance					
Hanna Ehtonen	Girls' slopestyle	DNS						did not advance		
Emma Kanko	Girls' halfpipe	16.00	26.00	12	did not advance					
Emma Kanko	Girls' slopestyle	55.00	27.75	10				did not advance		

== See also ==
- Finland at the 2012 Summer Olympics
