= Ice hockey at the 2012 Winter Youth Olympics – Boys' team rosters =

These were the team rosters of the nations participating in the Boys' ice hockey tournament of the 2012 Winter Youth Olympics. Each team was permitted a roster of 15 skaters and 2 goaltenders.

== Austria ==
The following is the Austrian roster for the Boys' ice hockey tournament at the 2012 Winter Youth Olympics.

Head coach: Kurt Harand

No.	Pos.	Name	Height	Weight	Birthdate	Team
2	F	Manuel Rosenlechner	1.76 m (5 ft 9 in)	80 kg (180 lb)	1 February 1996 (aged 15)	(Austria) Red Bull Salzburg
4	F	Mario Huber	1.86 m (6 ft 1 in)	95 kg (209 lb)	8 August 1996 (aged 15)	(Austria) TWK Innsbruck
6	F	Stefan Gaffal	1.73 m (5 ft 8 in)	58 kg (128 lb)	24 November 1996 (aged 15)	(Austria) Liwest Black Wings Linz
7	D	Fabian Kau	1.85 m (6 ft 1 in)	80 kg (180 lb)	2 February 1996 (aged 15)	(Austria) KAC
8	F	Nikolaus Kraus	1.77 m (5 ft 10 in)	73 kg (161 lb)	21 November 1996 (aged 15)	Lower Austria Stars
11	D	Tobias Oberauer	1.81 m (5 ft 11 in)	79 kg (174 lb)	11 October 1996 (aged 15)	(Austria) KAC
12	D	Erik Kirchschläger	1.72 m (5 ft 8 in)	61 kg (134 lb)	4 February 1996 (aged 15)	(Austria) Liwest Black Wings Linz
14	F	Stefan Trost	1.78 m (5 ft 10 in)	68 kg (150 lb)	28 April 1996 (aged 15)	(Austria) Moser Medical Graz99ers
15	F	Nikolaus Zierer	1.81 m (5 ft 11 in)	73 kg (161 lb)	5 January 1996 (aged 16)	(Austria) Moser Medical Graz99ers
16	F	Dominic Zwerger	1.83 m (6 ft 0 in)	79 kg (174 lb)	16 July 1996 (aged 15)	(Austria) Dornbirn
17	D	Lukas Telsnig	1.77 m (5 ft 10 in)	75 kg (165 lb)	28 February 1996 (aged 15)	(Austria) KAC
18	D	Mathias Hagen	1.75 m (5 ft 9 in)	73 kg (161 lb)	23 January 1996 (aged 15)	(Switzerland) SC Rheintal
19	D	Felix Urstöger	1.82 m (6 ft 0 in)	66 kg (146 lb)	5 June 1996 (aged 15)	(Austria) Liwest Black Wings Linz
20	F	Sandro Seifried	1.72 m (5 ft 8 in)	72 kg (159 lb)	1 November 1996 (aged 15)	(Austria) KAC
23	F	Daniel Jakubitzka	1.68 m (5 ft 6 in)	63 kg (139 lb)	17 June 1996 (aged 15)	(Austria) Red Bull Salzburg
29	GK	Thomas Stroj	1.83 m (6 ft 0 in)	69 kg (152 lb)	9 April 1996 (aged 15)	(Austria) VSV
30	GK	Stefan Müller	1.78 m (5 ft 10 in)	78 kg (172 lb)	2 May 1996 (aged 15)	(Switzerland) Pikes EHC Oberthurgau

== Canada ==
The following is the Canadian roster for the Boys' ice hockey tournament at the 2012 Winter Youth Olympics.

Head coach: Curtis Hunt

No.	Pos.	Name	Height	Weight	Birthdate	Team
3	D	Ryan Pilon	1.87 m (6 ft 2 in)	79 kg (174 lb)	10 October 1996 (aged 15)	(Canada) Beardy's Blackhawks
4	D	Josh Carrick	1.77 m (5 ft 10 in)	72 kg (159 lb)	24 January 1996 (aged 15)	(Canada) Toronto Red Wings
6	D	Brendan Nickerson	1.87 m (6 ft 2 in)	81 kg (179 lb)	23 April 1996 (aged 15)	(Canada) South Shore
7	F	Ryan Burton	1.72 m (5 ft 8 in)	65 kg (143 lb)	7 February 1996 (aged 15)	(Canada) Thunder Bay
8	F	Ryan Gropp	1.87 m (6 ft 2 in)	71 kg (157 lb)	16 September 1996 (aged 15)	(Canada) Okanagan Hockey Academy
12	F	Eric Cornel	1.85 m (6 ft 1 in)	74 kg (163 lb)	11 April 1996 (aged 15)	Upper Canada Cyclones
14	F	Garrett James	1.88 m (6 ft 2 in)	83 kg (183 lb)	6 January 1996 (aged 16)	(Canada) Huron-Perth Lakers
15	F	Reid Gardiner	1.80 m (5 ft 11 in)	79 kg (174 lb)	19 January 1996 (aged 15)	(Canada) Saskatoon Contacts
16	F	Reid Duke	1.77 m (5 ft 10 in)	72 kg (159 lb)	28 January 1996 (aged 15)	(Canada) Calgary Royals
17	D	Brycen Martin	1.85 m (6 ft 1 in)	72 kg (159 lb)	9 May 1996 (aged 15)	(Canada) Calgary Buffaloes
18	D	Jarrett Crossman	1.75 m (5 ft 9 in)	81 kg (179 lb)	17 March 1996 (aged 15)	(Canada) Moncton Flyers
22	F	Nicolas Hébert	1.77 m (5 ft 10 in)	80 kg (180 lb)	3 February 1996 (aged 15)	(Canada) Séminaire St-François Blizzard
24	F	Adam Brooks	1.77 m (5 ft 10 in)	65 kg (143 lb)	6 May 1996 (aged 15)	(Canada) Winnipeg Thrashers
26	F	Nathan Yetman	1.85 m (6 ft 1 in)	84 kg (185 lb)	18 April 1996 (aged 15)	(Canada) St. John's Maple Leafs
27	D	Joe Hicketts	1.67 m (5 ft 6 in)	76 kg (168 lb)	4 May 1996 (aged 15)	(Canada) Okanagan Hockey Academy
29	GK	Keven Bouchard	1.85 m (6 ft 1 in)	96 kg (212 lb)	19 April 1996 (aged 15)	(Canada) Jonquière Élites
30	GK	Sam Walsh	1.87 m (6 ft 2 in)	83 kg (183 lb)	7 March 1996 (aged 15)	(Canada) Charlottetown Islanders

== Finland ==
The following is the Finnish roster for the Boys' ice hockey tournament at the 2012 Winter Youth Olympics.

Head coach: Tomi Lämsä

No.	Pos.	Name	Height	Weight	Birthdate	Team
1	GK	Juuso Kannel	1.86 m (6 ft 1 in)	73 kg (161 lb)	12 May 1996 (aged 15)	(Finland) HPK
2	D	Markus Haapanen	1.77 m (5 ft 10 in)	77 kg (170 lb)	28 January 1996 (aged 15)	(Finland) HPK
3	D	Jaakko Hälli	1.81 m (5 ft 11 in)	77 kg (170 lb)	13 February 1996 (aged 15)	(Finland) Tappara
4	D	Joni Tuulola	1.85 m (6 ft 1 in)	78 kg (172 lb)	1 January 1996 (aged 16)	(Finland) HPK
5	D	Jere Rouhiainen	1.80 m (5 ft 11 in)	70 kg (150 lb)	16 January 1996 (aged 15)	(Finland) Tappara
7	D	Eetu Sopanen	1.91 m (6 ft 3 in)	92 kg (203 lb)	24 April 1996 (aged 15)	(Finland) Lahti Pelicans
9	D	Otto Tolvanen	1.84 m (6 ft 0 in)	75 kg (165 lb)	4 April 1996 (aged 15)	
12	F	Waltteri Hopponen	1.84 m (6 ft 0 in)	74 kg (163 lb)	4 February 1996 (aged 15)	(Finland) Espoo Blues
13	F	Manu Honkanen	1.78 m (5 ft 10 in)	70 kg (150 lb)	29 April 1996 (aged 15)	(Finland) HC TPS
14	F	Antti Kauppinen	1.79 m (5 ft 10 in)	77 kg (170 lb)	2 April 1996 (aged 15)	(Finland) HIFK
16	F	Kasperi Kapanen	1.73 m (5 ft 8 in)	68 kg (150 lb)	23 July 1996 (aged 15)	(Finland) KalPa
18	F	Miikka Pitkänen	1.72 m (5 ft 8 in)	60 kg (130 lb)	27 April 1996 (aged 15)	(Finland) KalPa
19	F	Joel Kiviranta	1.76 m (5 ft 9 in)	68 kg (150 lb)	23 March 1996 (aged 15)	(Finland) Jokerit
20	F	Alex Levanen	1.77 m (5 ft 10 in)	76 kg (168 lb)	12 June 1996 (aged 15)	(Finland) Espoo Blues
21	F	Otto Nieminen	1.74 m (5 ft 9 in)	74 kg (163 lb)	8 May 1996 (aged 15)	(Finland) HC TPS
22	F	Jonne Yliniemi	1.73 m (5 ft 8 in)	73 kg (161 lb)	14 February 1996 (aged 15)	(Finland) Lahti Pelicans
30	GK	Kaapo Kähkönen	1.86 m (6 ft 1 in)	81 kg (179 lb)	16 August 1996 (aged 15)	(Finland) Espoo Blues

== Russia ==
The following is the Russian roster for the Boys' ice hockey tournament at the 2012 Winter Youth Olympics.

Head coach: Pavel Baulin

No.	Pos.	Name	Height	Weight	Birthdate	Team
1	GK	Sergey Korobov	1.86 m (6 ft 1 in)	81 kg (179 lb)	3 April 1996 (aged 15)	(Russia) SKA-Neva
3	D	Rostislav Osipov	1.80 m (5 ft 11 in)	79 kg (174 lb)	4 January 1996 (aged 16)	(Russia) Ak Bars Kazan
5	D	Egor Orlov	1.83 m (6 ft 0 in)	73 kg (161 lb)	20 July 1996 (aged 15)	(Russia) Dynamo Moscow
7	F	Evgeny Svechnikov	1.83 m (6 ft 0 in)	75 kg (165 lb)	31 October 1996 (aged 15)	(Russia) Ak Bars Kazan
10	F	Ilya Zinovyev	1.78 m (5 ft 10 in)	80 kg (180 lb)	15 March 1996 (aged 15)	(Russia) Traktor Chelyabinsk
11	F	Ivan Nikolishin	1.72 m (5 ft 8 in)	67 kg (148 lb)	12 April 1996 (aged 15)	(Russia) CSKA Moscow
14	F	Daniil Vovchenko	1.73 m (5 ft 8 in)	60 kg (130 lb)	4 April 1996 (aged 15)	(Russia) Severstal Cherepovets
17	F	Arkhip Nekolenko	1.85 m (6 ft 1 in)	72 kg (159 lb)	11 March 1996 (aged 16)	(Russia) Krylya Sovetov Moscow
18	D	Eduard Nasybullin	1.74 m (5 ft 9 in)	65 kg (143 lb)	18 February 1996 (aged 15)	(Russia) Ak Bars Kazan
19	F	Stanislav Kondratyev	1.76 m (5 ft 9 in)	78 kg (172 lb)	14 February 1996 (aged 15)	(Russia) CSKA Moscow
20	GK	Maxim Tretyak	1.87 m (6 ft 2 in)	92 kg (203 lb)	22 October 1996 (aged 15)	(Russia) CSKA Moscow
21	F	Andrei Svetlakov	1.79 m (5 ft 10 in)	77 kg (170 lb)	6 April 1996 (aged 15)	(Russia) CSKA Moscow
23	F	Maxim Lazarev	1.76 m (5 ft 9 in)	67 kg (148 lb)	29 January 1996 (aged 15)	(Russia) Ak Bars Kazan
24	D	Yegor Tsvetkov	1.79 m (5 ft 10 in)	78 kg (172 lb)	2 February 1996 (aged 15)	(Russia) Lokomotiv Yaroslavl
25	F	Alexander Protapovich	1.85 m (6 ft 1 in)	78 kg (172 lb)	16 August 1996 (aged 15)	(Russia) Ak Bars Kazan
27	D	Dmitri Sergeyev	1.84 m (6 ft 0 in)	78 kg (172 lb)	26 March 1996 (aged 15)	(Russia) Traktor Chelyabinsk
28	D	Alexander Mikulovich	1.90 m (6 ft 3 in)	81 kg (179 lb)	1 July 1996 (aged 15)	(Russia) Traktor Chelyabinsk

== United States ==
The following is the American roster for the Boys' ice hockey tournament at the 2012 Winter Youth Olympics.

Head coach: Ben Smith

No.	Pos.	Name	Height	Weight	Birthdate	Team
1	GK	Edwin Minney	1.96 m (6 ft 5 in)	88 kg (194 lb)	29 March 1996 (aged 15)	(United States) DC Capitals
2	D	Nathan Billitier	1.80 m (5 ft 11 in)	82 kg (181 lb)	20 May 1996 (aged 15)	(United States) Rochester Stars
3	D	Adam Baughman	1.88 m (6 ft 2 in)	79 kg (174 lb)	3 January 1996 (aged 16)	(United States) Chicago Mission
4	D	Ryan Bliss	1.85 m (6 ft 1 in)	84 kg (185 lb)	22 June 1996 (aged 15)	(United States) St. Paul's School
5	D	Jack Glover	1.88 m (6 ft 2 in)	77 kg (170 lb)	17 May 1996 (aged 15)	(United States) Benilde-St. Margaret's School
6	D	Josh Jacobs	1.85 m (6 ft 1 in)	78 kg (172 lb)	15 February 1996 (aged 15)	(United States) DC Capitals
8	D	Kevin Kerr	1.80 m (5 ft 11 in)	70 kg (150 lb)	9 February 1996 (aged 15)	(United States) Team Comcast
9	F	Shane Gersich	1.80 m (5 ft 11 in)	74 kg (163 lb)	10 July 1996 (aged 15)	(United States) Holy Family Catholic
10	F	Blake Clarke	1.83 m (6 ft 0 in)	91 kg (201 lb)	24 January 1996 (aged 15)	(United States) Fargo Force
11	F	Jared Fiegl	1.83 m (6 ft 0 in)	86 kg (190 lb)	23 January 1996 (aged 15)	(United States) Colorado Rampage
12	F	Jack Eichel	1.83 m (6 ft 0 in)	91 kg (201 lb)	28 October 1996 (aged 15)	(United States) Boston Junior Bruins
14	F	Ryan MacInnis	1.91 m (6 ft 3 in)	77 kg (170 lb)	14 February 1996 (aged 15)	(United States) St. Louis Amateur Blues
15	F	Nicholas Magyar	1.88 m (6 ft 2 in)	79 kg (174 lb)	29 May 1996 (aged 15)	(United States) Cleveland Barons
16	F	Nick Schmaltz	1.80 m (5 ft 11 in)	75 kg (165 lb)	23 February 1996 (aged 15)	(United States) Chicago Mission
17	F	Joe Wegwerth	1.88 m (6 ft 2 in)	86 kg (190 lb)	16 June 1996 (aged 15)	(United States) Brewster Bulldogs
18	F	Marcel Godbout	1.79 m (5 ft 10 in)	82 kg (181 lb)	4 June 1996 (aged 15)	(United States) Shattuck-Saint Mary's
30	GK	Logan Halladay	1.85 m (6 ft 1 in)	79 kg (174 lb)	17 August 1996 (aged 15)	(United States) Carolina Jr. Hurricanes
