= Ice hockey at the 2012 Winter Youth Olympics – Boys' tournament =

2012 Winter Youth Olympics – Boys' tournament
Tournament details
- Host country: Austria
- Venue: 1 (in 1 host city)
- Dates: 13–22 January
- Teams: 5

Final positions
- Champions: Finland (1st title)
- Runners-up: Russia
- Third place: Canada
- Fourth place: United States

Tournament statistics
- Games played: 14
- Goals scored: 100 (7.14 per game)
- Attendance: 20,880 (1,491 per game)
- Scoring leader: (Russia) Ivan Nikolishin (12 points)

The boys' ice hockey tournament at the 2012 Winter Youth Olympics was held from 13 to 22 January at the Tyrolean Ice Arena in Innsbruck, Austria.

Teams from five national hockey associations competed, in one single preliminary round group. The tournament consisted of 14 games: 10 in the preliminary round (teams played all other teams); 2 semifinal games; 1 bronze medal game; and 1 gold medal game.

All games were played in three 15-minute periods, as opposed to the traditional 20-minute periods.

== Qualification ==
The top eight teams in the 2011 IIHF World Ranking will choose which tournament (either boys' or girls') they want to compete in. First priority is given to higher ranked nations.

== Rosters ==
Each country is allowed to enter 17 athletes each.

== Preliminary round ==
All times are local (UTC+1).

Pos	Team	Pld	W	OTW	OTL	L	GF	GA	GD	Pts	Qualification
1	Russia	4	3	0	0	1	25	9	+16	9	Semifinals
2	Canada	4	2	1	0	1	20	7	+13	8	Semifinals
3	Finland	4	2	0	1	1	13	11	+2	7	Semifinals
4	United States	4	2	0	0	2	14	18	−4	6	Semifinals
5	Austria (H)	4	0	0	0	4	3	30	−27	0	

Source: IIHF
Rules for classification: 1) points; 2) head-to-head points; 3) head-to-head goal difference; 4) head-to-head number of goals scored; 5) result against closest best-ranked team outside tied teams; 6) result against second-best ranked team outside tied teams.
(H) Host

13 January 2012; 10:15	Austria	0–3 (0–0, 0–0, 0–3)	Finland	Tyrolean Ice Arena; Attendance: 520

Game reference

Thomas Stroj
Goalies
Juuso Kannel
Referee:
(Germany) Simon Acher
Linesmen:
(Belarus) Andrei Haurylenka
(Germany) Benjamin Hoppe

0–1	30:22 − Kapanen (Hopponen)
0–2	32:05 − Hopponen (Honkanen, Kapanen)
0–3	44:40 − Kiviranta (Sopanen, Kannel) (SH, ENG)

10 min
Penalties
2 min
8
Shots
43

13 January 2012; 14:45	Russia	4–3 (2–1, 2–1, 0–1)	Canada	Tyrolean Ice Arena; Attendance: 932

Game reference

Sergey Korobov
Goalies
Keven Bouchard
Referee:
(Sweden) Andreas Harnebring
Linesmen:
(Sweden) Daniel Persson
(Austria) Martin Smeibidlo

Protapovich (Tsvetkov) – 05:08	1–0
	1–1	05:33 – Pilon (Hicketts, Gardiner)
Tsvetkov – 11:56	2–1
Lazarev (Nikolishin) (SH) – 18:58	3–1
	3–2	21:37 – Brooks (Carrick)
Vovchenko (Nikolishin) – 26:38	4–2
	4–3	42:05 – Gardiner (Hicketts)

2 min
Penalties
4 min
23
Shots
29

14 January 2012; 12:30	United States	7–2 (4–0, 1–1, 2–1)	Austria	Tyrolean Ice Arena; Attendance: 1,180

Game reference

Edwin Minney
Goalies
Stefan Müller
Referee:
(Latvia) Andris Ansons
Linesmen:
(Slovenia) Tilen Pahor
(Sweden) Daniel Persson

Gersich (Godbout, Schmaltz) – 00:47	1–0
Wegwerth (Eichel, Clarke) – 01:13	2–0
MacInnis (Magyar, Baughman) (PP) – 09:02	3–0
Gersich (Eichel) (PP) – 12:03	4–0
	4–1	20:40 – Huber
Gersich (Billitier) – 23:37	5–1
	5–2	30:44 – Gaffal (Kraus, Huber)
MacInnis (Godbout, Jacobs) (SH) – 41:06	6–2
Godbout (Schmaltz) (SH) – 41:24	7–2

14 min
Penalties
10 min
42
Shots
16

15 January 2012; 13:30	Finland	4–3 (0–2, 3–0, 1–1)	Russia	Tyrolean Ice Arena; Attendance: 783

Game reference

Kaapo Kähkönen
Goalies
Maxim Tretiak
Referee:
(Norway) Stian Halm
Linesmen:
(Germany) Benjamin Hoppe
(Austria) Martin Smeibidlo

	0–1	03:32 – Sergeev (PP)
	0–2	14:56 – Nikolishin (Nasybullin, Lazarev) (PP2)
Honkanen (PS) – 25:04	1–2
Kapanen (Tuulola, Sopanen) (PP) – 27:08	2–2
Hopponen (Kapanen, Honkanen) (PP) – 29:33	3–2
Kapanen – 30:41	4–2
	4–3	35:31 – Nikolishin (Lazarev, Svechnikov)

22 min
Penalties
10 min
21
Shots
32

15 January 2012; 18:00	Canada	5–1 (1–0, 2–1, 2–0)	United States	Tyrolean Ice Arena; Attendance: 2,575

Game reference

Kevin Bouchard
Goalies
Edwin Minney
Logan Halladay
Referee:
(Germany) Simon Aicher
Linesmen:
(Belarus) Andrei Haurylenka
(Slovenia) Tilen Pahor

Cornel – 03:58	1–0
Gropp (Cornel) – 16:30	2–0
	2–1	17:39 – Clarke (Jacobs)
Duke (Brooks, Pilon) – 28:54	3–1
Brooks (Martin, Gardiner) (PP) – 43:21	4–1
Gropp (Cornel, Gardiner) (PP) – 44:06	5–1

2 min
Penalties
10 min
27
Shots
16

16 January 2012; 12:45	Russia	11–1 (0–1, 4–0, 7–0)	Austria	Tyrolean Ice Arena; Attendance: 1,274

Game reference

Sergey Korobov
Maxim Tretiak
Goalies
Thomas Stroj
Referee:
(Sweden) Andreas Harnebring
Linesmen:
(Slovenia) Tilen Pahor
(Sweden) Daniel Persson

	0–1	12:30 – Gaffal (Kraus) (PP)
Kondratyev (Vovchenko, Tsvetkov) – 16:13	1–1
Svetlakov (Vovchenko) – 19:33	2–1
Nikolishin (Nekolenko) – 25:51	3–1
Protapovich (Lazarev) (PP) – 27:55	4–1
Zinovev (PP) – 31:23	5–1
Svechnikov (Protapovich) – 33:22	6–1
Nikolishin (Zinovev) – 33:32	7–1
Protapovich (Lazarev, Orlov) (PP) – 35:34	8–1
Mikulovich (Nikolishin, Sergeev) – 40:04	9–1
Svechnikov (Lazarev, Nasybullin) (PP) – 42:41	10–1
Nikolishin (Zinovev, Nekolenko) – 43:52	11–1

8 min
Penalties
16 min
53
Shots
12

17 January 2012; 11:15	Austria	0–9 (0–4, 0–2, 0–3)	Canada	Tyrolean Ice Arena; Attendance: 749

Game reference

Stefan Müller
Goalies
Sam Walsh
Referee:
(Norway) Stian Halm
Linesmen:
(Belarus) Andrei Haurylenka
(Germany) Benjamin Hoppe

0–1	00:40 – Brooks (Hébert, Martin)
0–2	02:16 – Burton (Yetman, Crossman)
0–3	06:15 – Gropp (Cornel) (PP)
0–4	12:07 – Cornel (Gropp)
0–5	16:42 – Gardiner (Gropp)
0–6	24:35 – James
0–7	38:31 – Duke (Martin, Brooks) (PP)
0–8	40:14 – Pilon
0–9	41:24 – Duke (Martin, Carrick)

10 min
Penalties
6 min
16
Shots
44

17 January 2012; 15:45	Finland	4–5 (1–0, 2–3, 1–2)	United States	Tyrolean Ice Arena; Attendance: 1,824

Game reference

Jusso Kannel
Goalies
Edwin Minney
Referee:
(Latvia) Andris Ansons
Linesmen:
(Slovenia) Tilen Pahor
(Austria) Martin Smeibidlo

Kiviranta (Hopponen, Tuulola) – 12:16	1–0
	1–1	16:31 – Baughman (Schmaltz)
Tuulola (Kiviranta, Pitkänen) – 19:45	2–1
	2–2	23:10 – Glover (Bliss) (PP)
Kauppinen (Hopponen, Levänen) – 24:36	3–2
	3–3	27:47 – Clarke (Kerr)
	3–4	31:01 – Schmaltz (Bliss, Fiegl)
	3–5	32:15 – MacInnis (Gersich, Magyar)
Kapanen (Haapanen) – 41:45	4–5

10 min
Penalties
26 min
29
Shots
32

18 January 2012; 11:45	Canada	3–2 GWS (0–0, 2–1, 0–1) (OT: 0–0) (SO: 1–0)	Finland	Tyrolean Ice Arena; Attendance: 1,261

Game reference

Kevin Bouchard
Goalies
Kaapo Kähkönen
Referee:
(Sweden) Andreas Harnebring
Linesmen:
(Belarus) Andrei Haurylenka
(Austria) Martin Smeibidlo

Brooks (Duke) – 15:11	1–0
	1–1	21:05 – Kiviranta (Pitkänen)
Cornel (Gropp, Hicketts) – 22:01	2–1
	2–2	36:42 – Kiviranta (Pitkänen, Nieminen)

Cornel (miss)
Gropp
Gardiner
Shootout
(miss) Kiviranta
Kapanen
(miss) Honkanen
6 min
Penalties
8 min
27
Shots
25

18 January 2012; 16:15	United States	1–7 (0–2, 0–3, 1–2)	Russia	Tyrolean Ice Arena; Attendance: 2,124

Game reference

Edwin Minney
Logan Halladay
Goalies
Sergey Korobov
Referee:
(Germany) Simon Aicher
Linesmen:
(Germany) Benjamin Hoppe
(Sweden) Daniel Persson

	0–1	01:43 – Orlov (Svechnikov, Protapovich (PP)
	0–2	06:47 – Mikulovich (Nikolishin, Sergeev) (PP)
	0–3	16:24 – Kondratyev (Svetlakov)
	0–4	19:32 – Svechnikov (Lazarev, Protapovich) (PP)
	0–5	21:58 – Lazarev (Svechnikov)
Fiegl (MacInnis, Wegwerth) – 38:17	1–5
	1–6	40:30 – Lazarev (Svechnikov)
	1–7	43:32 – Nasybullin (Orlov, Protapovich) (PP)

16 min
Penalties
4 min
15
Shots
30

== Playoffs ==
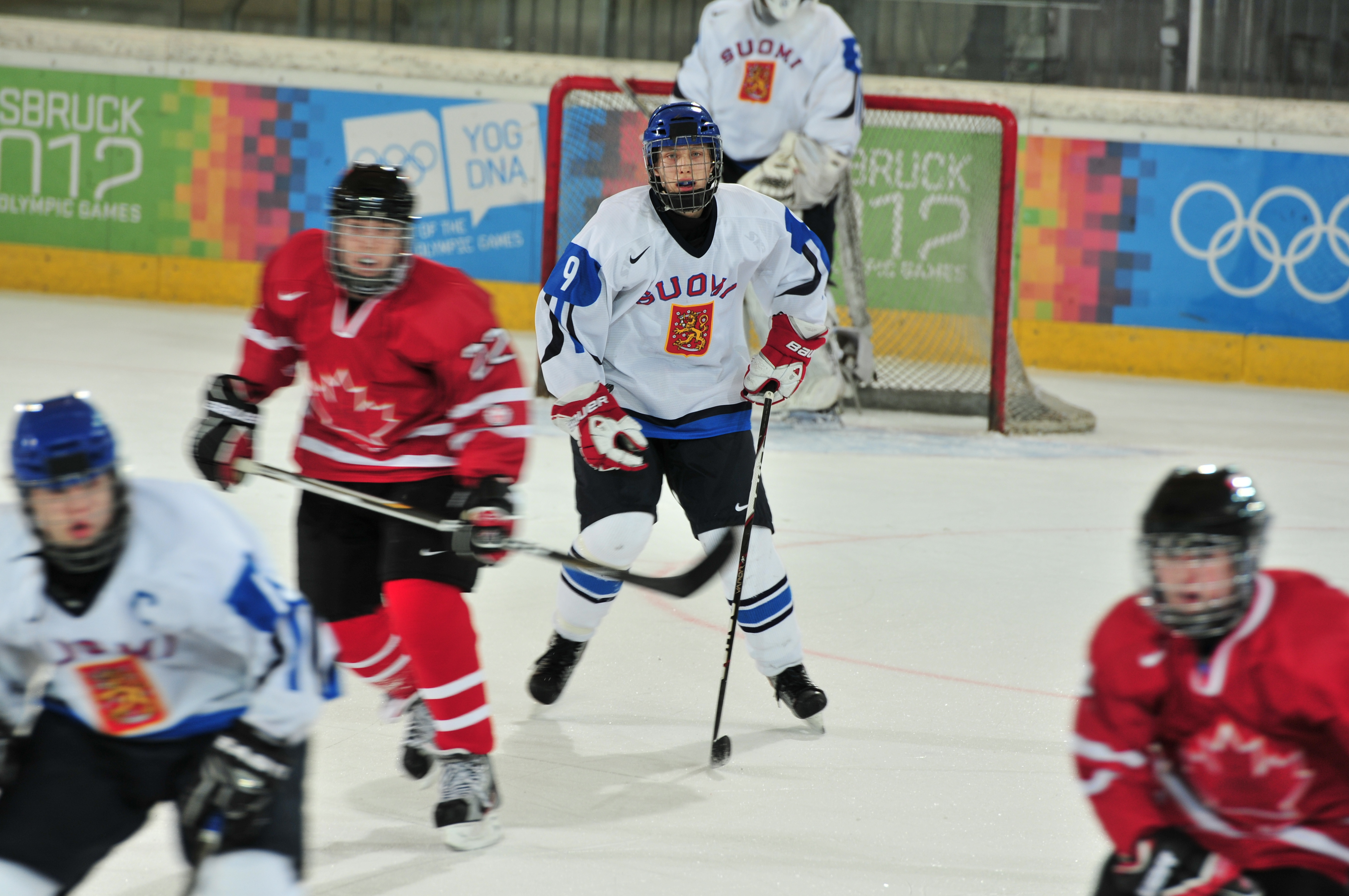
Canada against Finland

Semifinals
1	Russia	5
4	United States	2
2	Canada	1
3	Finland	2

Gold medal game
1	Russia	1
3	Finland (GWS)	2
Bronze medal game
2	Canada	7
4	United States	5

=== Semifinals ===
20 January 2012; 14:15	Russia	5–2 (1–0, 1–0, 3–2)	United States	Tyrolean Ice Arena; Attendance: 1,632

Game reference

Sergey Korobov
Goalies
Logan Halladay
Referee:
(Sweden) Andreas Harnebring
Linesmen:
(Belarus) Andrei Haurylenka
(Sweden) Daniel Persson

Orlov (Nasybullin, Protapovich) (PP) – 02:06	1–0
Nikolishin (Nekolenko) – 28:01	2–0
Zinovev (Mikulovich, Nikolishin) – 31:03	3–0
Nekolenko (Nikolishin, Sergeev) – 32:49	4–0
	4–1	40:06 – Wegwerth (Eichel)
	4–2	41:22 – Eichel (Glover) (PP, EA)
Svechnikov (ENG) – 44:37	5–2

14 min
Penalties
8 min
16
Shots
32

20 January 2012; 18:45	Canada	1–2 (1–1, 0–0, 0–1)	Finland	Tyrolean Ice Arena; Attendance: 1,426

Game reference

Keven Bouchard
Goalies
Kaapo Kähkönen
Referee:
(Germany) Simon Aicher
Linesmen:
(Germany) Benjamin Hoppe
(Slovenia) Tilen Pahor

Carrick (Gardiner, Cornel) (PP) – 04:17	1–0
	1–1	11:29 – Nieminen (Kiviranta, Pitkänen)
	1–2	40:26 – Sopanen (Nieminen, Pitkänen) (PP)

8 min
Penalties
10 min
17
Shots
19

=== Bronze medal game ===
21 January 2012; 14:45	Canada	7–5 (3–1, 4–1, 0–3)	United States	Tyrolean Ice Arena; Attendance: 1,592

Game reference

Keven Bouchard
Goalies
Logan Halladay
Referee:
(Norway) Stian Halm
Linesmen:
(Germany) Benjamin Hoppe
(Austria) Martin Smeibidlo

Cornel (Gardiner, Hicketts) (PP) – 04:19	1–0
Pilon (Gardiner, Cornel) – 06:58	2–0
Gropp (Gardiner, Pilon) (PP) – 13:22	3–0
	3–1	14:53 – Billitier (Baughman)
	3–2	19:40 – MacInnis (Eichel)
Brooks (Duke, Martin) – 21:27	4–2
Gardiner (Hicketts) – 22:35	5–2
Gropp – 23:10	6–2
Gropp (Gardiner) – 25:40	7–2
	7–3	31:44 – Eichel (Schmaltz)
	7–4	38:54 – Magyar (Jacobs, Wegwerth)
	7–5	40:10 – Schmaltz (MacInnis, Godbout) (PP)

8 min
Penalties
12 min
19
Shots
40

=== Gold medal game ===
22 January 2012; 12:15	Russia	1–2 GWS (1–0, 0–0, 0–1) (OT: 0–0) (SO: 0–1)	Finland	Tyrolean Ice Arena; Attendance: 3,008

Game reference
Sergey Korobov	Goalies	Kaapo Kähkönen	Referee: (Germany) Simon Aicher; Linesmen: (Belarus) Andrei Haurylenka (Sweden) Daniel Persson
Zinovev – 08:35 / 1–0; / 1–1 / 43:58 – Hopponen (EA)			Referee: (Germany) Simon Aicher; Linesmen: (Belarus) Andrei Haurylenka (Sweden) Daniel Persson
Lazarev (miss); Nikolishin (miss)	Shootout	Honkanen; Kapanen	Referee: (Germany) Simon Aicher; Linesmen: (Belarus) Andrei Haurylenka (Sweden) Daniel Persson
24 min	Penalties	26 min	Referee: (Germany) Simon Aicher; Linesmen: (Belarus) Andrei Haurylenka (Sweden) Daniel Persson
28	Shots	25	Referee: (Germany) Simon Aicher; Linesmen: (Belarus) Andrei Haurylenka (Sweden) Daniel Persson
