= Tyrolean Ice Arena =

Indoor arena in Innsbruck, Austria

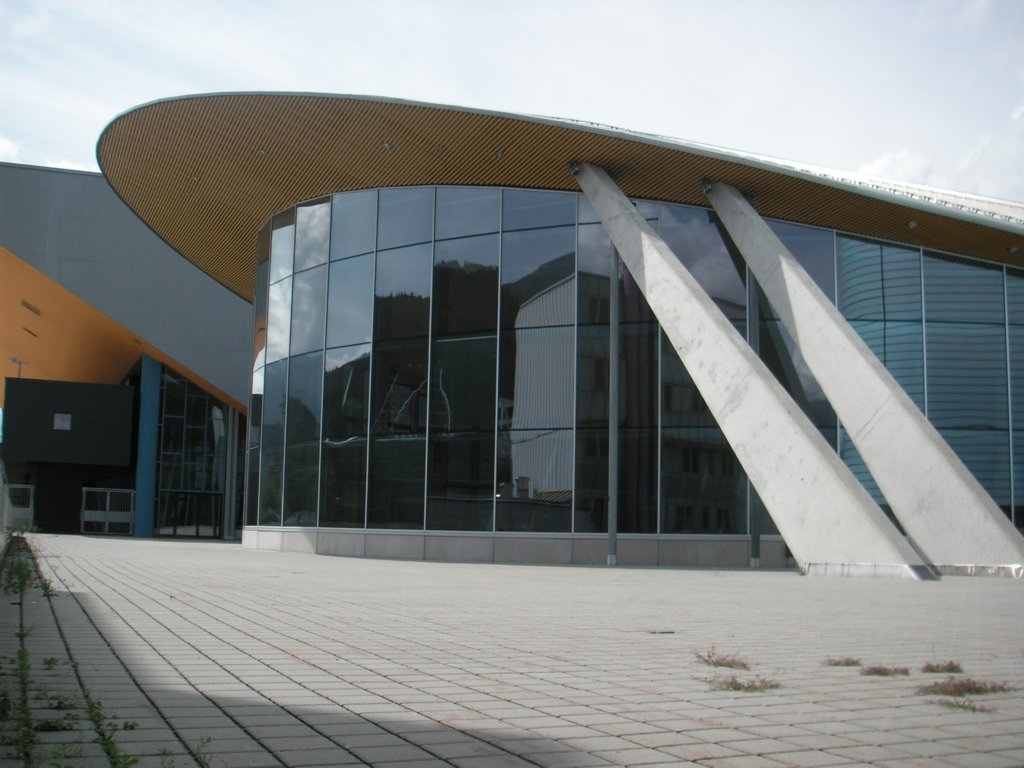
- Interactive map of Tyrolean Ice Arena
- Former names: Tiroler Wasserkraft Arena
- Location: Olympiastraße 10, 6020 Innsbruck
- Capacity: 3,500 (ice hockey)

Construction
- Opened: 2005
- Architects: Rang & Volz

Tenant
- HC TWK Innsbruck (EBEL)

Tyrolean Ice Arena, also known as TIWAG Arena, is an indoor sporting arena located in Innsbruck, Austria. The arena originally had a capacity of 3,000 people and was opened in 2005 for the 2005 World Ice Hockey Championships. It is adjoined to the larger Olympiahalle which was inaugurated in 1963.

The Olympiahalle was renovated for the ice hockey tournament at the same time as the new venue was built and are part of OlympiaWorld Innsbruck, a consortium that is responsible for maintaining venues that hosted both the 1964 and 1976 Winter Olympics.

It is currently the home arena of HC TWK Innsbruck who play in the Austrian Hockey League. In the 2022/23 season, the arena was expanded to more than 3,500 seats for the team's home games. This capacity expansion was achieved through additional stands installed behind the north stand.

== See also ==
- OlympiaWorld Innsbruck
- List of indoor arenas in Austria
