= Joe Hicketts =

Canadian ice hockey player (born 1996)

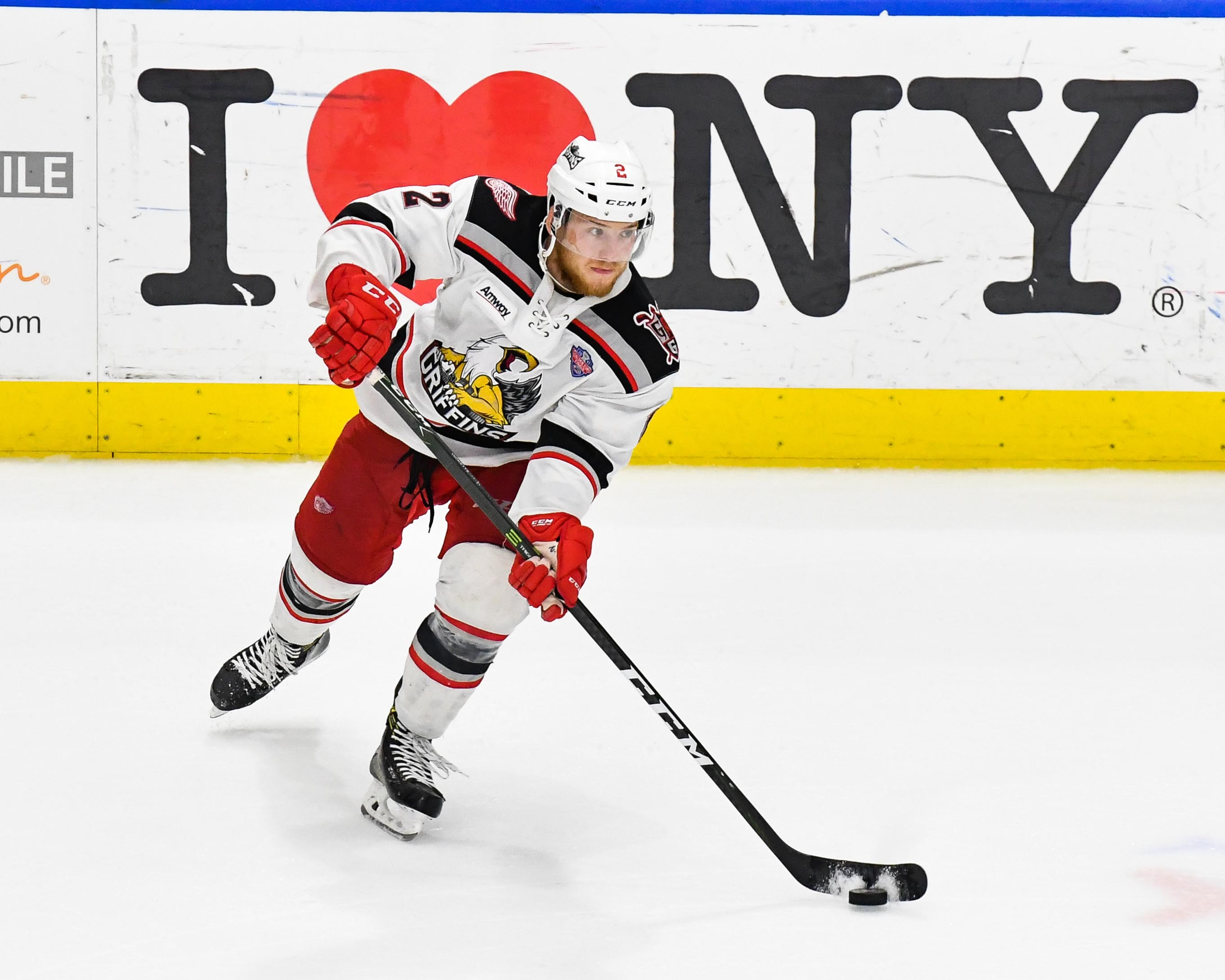
- Hicketts with the Grand Rapids Griffins
- Born: May 4, 1996 (age 30) Kamloops, British Columbia, Canada
- Height: 5 ft 8 in (173 cm)
- Weight: 180 lb (82 kg; 12 st 12 lb)
- Position: Defence
- Shoots: Left
- NHL team (P) Cur. team Former teams: Los Angeles Kings; Ontario Reign (AHL); Detroit Red Wings
- NHL draft: Undrafted
- Playing career: 2016–present

Joseph Hicketts (born May 4, 1996) is a Canadian professional ice hockey defenceman for the Ontario Reign of the American Hockey League (AHL) while under contract to the Los Angeles Kings of the National Hockey League (NHL).

== Playing career ==
=== Junior ===
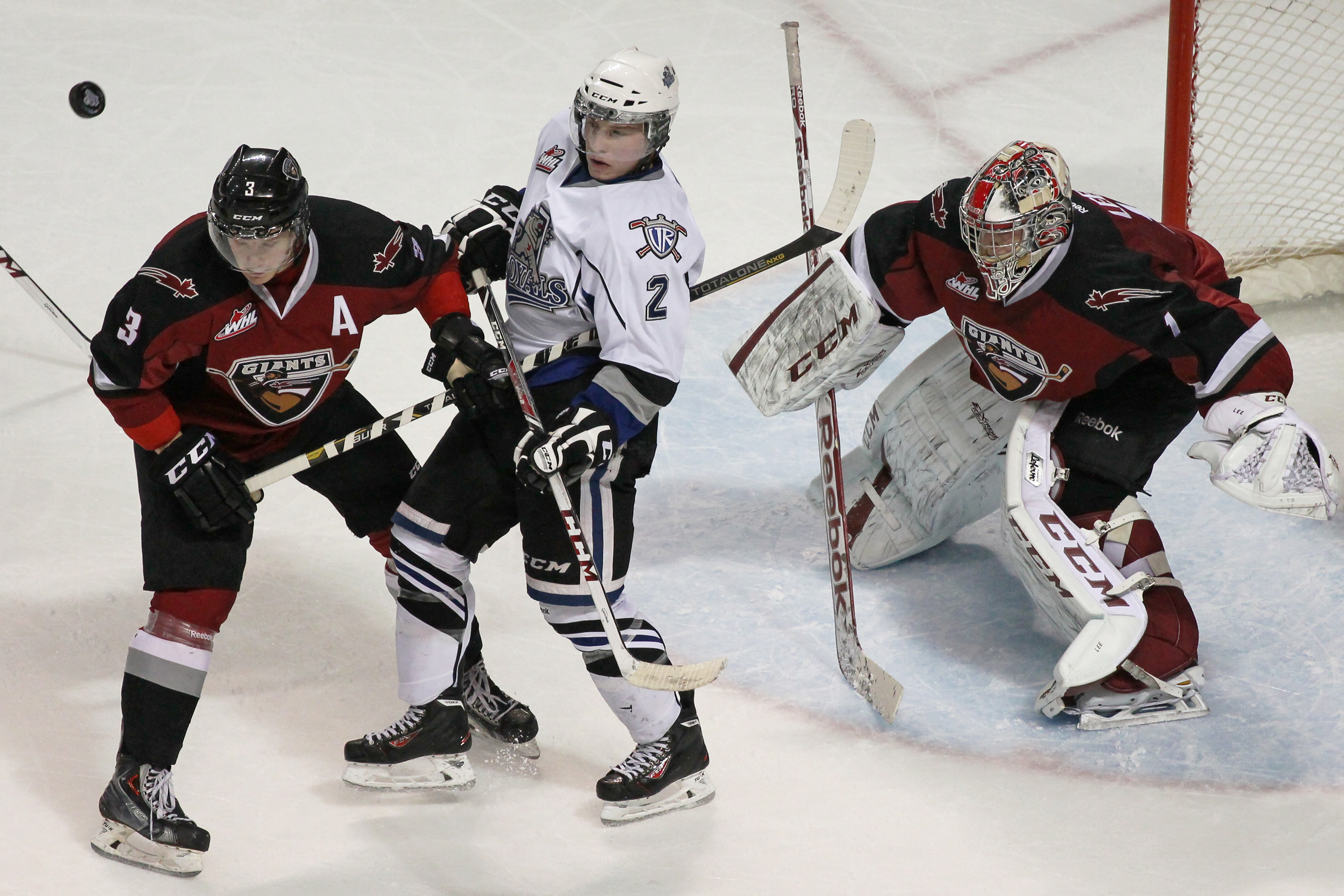
Hicketts (middle) battles Brett Kulak (left) during the 2013–14 WHL season with the Victoria Royals.

Hicketts was drafted 12th overall by the Victoria Royals in the 2011 WHL Bantam Draft after spending the 2010–11 season with the Kamloops Bantam AAA Jardine Blazers where he scored eighteen goals and 41 assists in 51 games played. Hicketts spent the 2011–12 season at the Okanagan Hockey Academy in Penticton, British Columbia.

During the 2012–13 season, Hicketts played in 67 of 72 regular season games for the Royals, where he recorded six goals and 18 assists in his first season.

During the 2013–14 season, Hicketts was an assistant captain for the Royals in his second season. Hicketts recorded six goals and 18 assists in 36 regular season games for the Royals, before missing three months after undergoing surgery for an upper-body injury in October 2013.

Hicketts was undrafted in the 2014 NHL entry draft, but was invited to attend the Detroit Red Wings Development Camp the following week. He was subsequently named to the Red Wings roster for the 2014 NHL Prospects Tournament in Traverse City, Michigan in September, after which he was invited to the Red Wings main training camp. On September 24, 2014, one day after the end of training camp, Hicketts was signed as a free agent by the Red Wings to a three-year, $1.9 million entry-level contract. Having not played in any preseason games, Hicketts was assigned to the Victoria Royals on October 2, 2014. Hicketts spent the majority of the 2014–15 season with the Victoria Royals of the WHL, where he ranked second among WHL defensemen in scoring with 12 goals and 52 assists in 62 games. Following an outstanding season with the Royals, Hicketts was named to the 2014–15 WHL Western Conference Second All-Star Team. On April 23, 2015, Hicketts was reassigned to the Grand Rapids Griffins of the American Hockey League.

The following season, Hicketts again participated in the Red Wings Development Camp, the 2015 NHL Prospects Tournament in Traverse City, as well as the Red Wings main training camp. After a few days of training camp, Hicketts was among the first wave of Red Wings cuts when he was assigned to the Victoria Royals on September 21, 2015. During the 2015–16 season, Hicketts recorded eight goals, and 53 assists in 59 games. He finished the season tied for second in the WHL for assists by a defenceman, with 53, and seventh in scoring, with 61 points. Earlier this season, Hicketts set the Royals' all-time franchise record for most career points by a defenceman (173) and powerplay assists (70). Following an outstanding season, Hicketts was named to the 2015–16 WHL Western Conference First All-Star Team, and was named the Western Conference Top Defenceman, and Western Conference Player of the Year. He was also nominated for the WHL's Four Broncos Memorial Trophy, as the league's player of the year. Later in the season, after the Victoria Royals were eliminated from the 2016 WHL playoffs, Hicketts was assigned to the Grand Rapids Griffins of the American Hockey League (AHL) for their 2016 Calder Cup playoffs run.

=== Professional ===
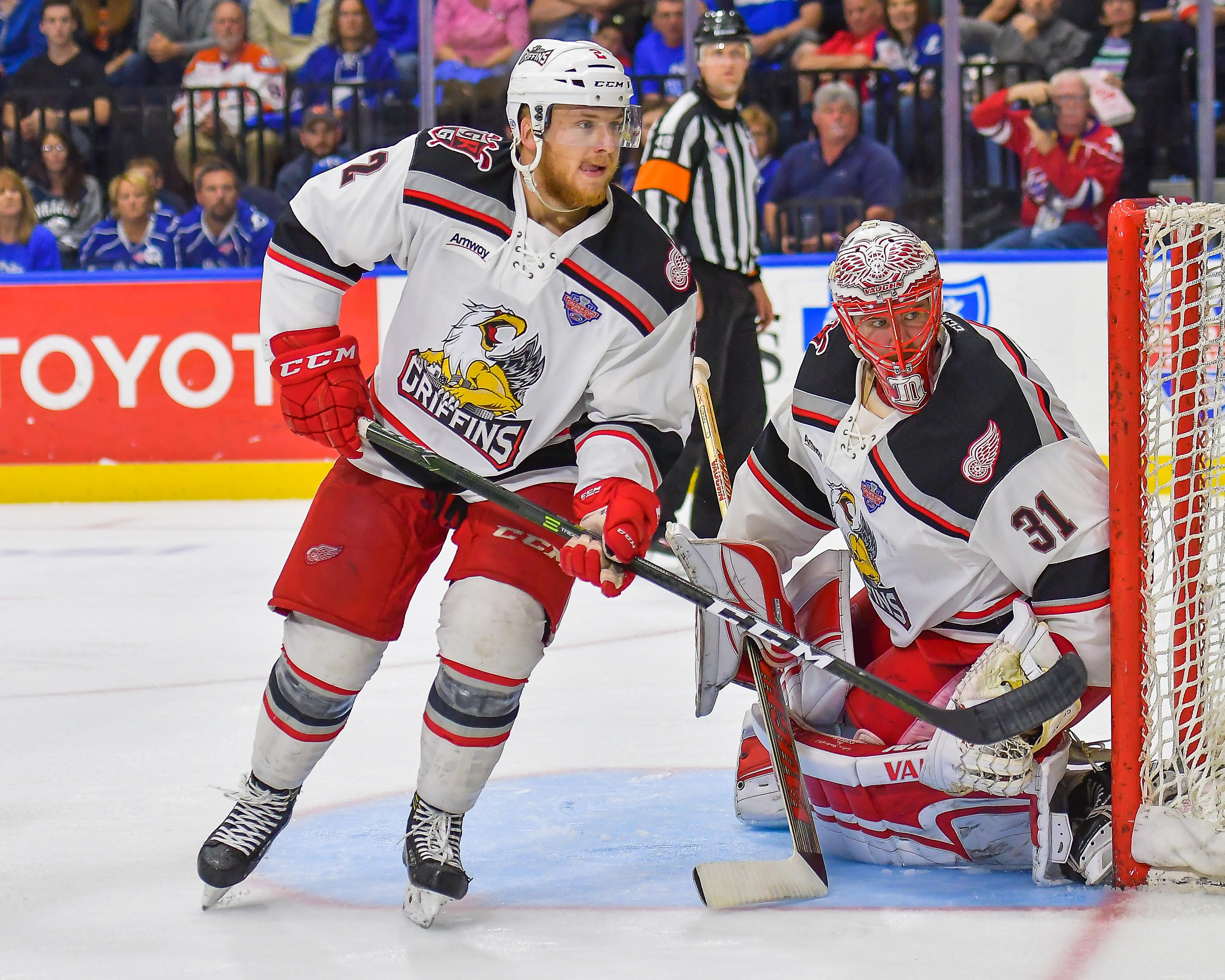
Hicketts (left) with the Grand Rapids Griffins during the 2017 Calder Cup playoffs.

Hicketts began his first professional season by once again participating in Detroit Red Wings training camp. On October 8, 2016, Hicketts was assigned to the Grand Rapids Griffins. On January 21, 2018, Hicketts was recalled by the Red Wings. He made his NHL debut the next night in a game against the New Jersey Devils, logging 15:13 of ice time, along with 4:22 on the penalty kill. On January 23, he was returned to the Griffins. On March 26, 2018, Hicketts was again recalled by the Red Wings. Prior to being recalled he recorded three goals and seven assists in 63 games for the Griffins. Hicketts recorded his first two NHL points by assisting on Frans Nielsen and Darren Helm's goals on March 27, 2018, in a 5–2 win over the Pittsburgh Penguins. On April 4, Hicketts was assigned to the Griffins. He appeared in five games for the Red Wings, posting three assists, a plus-five rating, two penalty minutes, two shots on goal, nine hits and 12 blocked shots. Hicketts began the 2018–19 season with the Red Wings. On October 31, 2018, Hicketts was assigned to the Grand Rapids Griffins. He appeared in eight games for the Red Wings, averaging 17:06 of ice time per game and ranking second among team defensemen with 15 hits. On April 1, 2019, Hicketts was recalled from the Griffins under emergency conditions. Prior to being recalled, he led the team in defensemen scoring with three goals and 24 assists in 61 games. Hicketts appeared in 11 games for the Red Wings during the season. On April 7, he was re-assigned to the Griffins.

On July 17, 2019, the Red Wings re-signed Hicketts to a two-year contract. On January 12, 2021, the Red Wings assigned Hicketts to the Grand Rapids Griffins.

On July 28, 2021, as a free agent, Hicketts signed a two-year, two-way contract with the Minnesota Wild. He played the entirety of his contract with the Wild assigned to AHL affiliate, the Iowa Wild.

As a free agent from the Wild at the conclusion of his contract, Hicketts was signed to a one-year, two-way contract with the Los Angeles Kings on July 2, 2023.

On March 20, 2025, the Kings signed Hicketts to a two-year, two-way contract extension with an average annual value of $775,000.

== International play ==
Medal record

ice hockey

Representing Canada

Youth Olympic Games
Bronze medal – third place	2012 Innsbruck	

Ivan Hlinka Memorial Tournament
Gold medal – first place	2013 Czech Republic/Slovakia	

IIHF World U18 Championship
Bronze medal – third place	2014 Finland	

IIHF World U20 Championship
Gold medal – first place	2015 Canada	

Hicketts captained Canada's Winter Youth Olympic team to bronze in 2012, and captained Team Pacific at the 2013 World U-17 Hockey Challenge. Hicketts represented Canada at the 2014 IIHF World U18 Championships, where he recorded one goal and three assists in seven games, and won a bronze medal. Hicketts also represented Canada at the 2015 World Junior Ice Hockey Championship, where he recorded three assists in seven games, and won a gold medal. Hicketts represented Canada at the 2016 World Junior Ice Hockey Championships, where he recorded one goal and two assists in five games, and finished in sixth place.

== Career statistics ==
=== Regular season and playoffs ===
			Regular season					Playoffs
Season	Team	League	GP	G	A	Pts	PIM	GP	G	A	Pts	PIM
2012–13	Victoria Royals	WHL	67	6	18	24	45	6	0	1	1	2
2013–14	Victoria Royals	WHL	36	6	18	24	12	9	0	2	2	9
2014–15	Victoria Royals	WHL	62	12	52	64	48	10	0	5	5	10
2015–16	Victoria Royals	WHL	59	8	53	61	44	6	1	6	7	8
2016–17	Grand Rapids Griffins	AHL	73	7	27	34	40	19	1	7	8	8
2017–18	Grand Rapids Griffins	AHL	67	3	9	12	32	5	0	2	2	2
2017–18	Detroit Red Wings	NHL	5	0	3	3	2	—	—	—	—	—
2018–19	Detroit Red Wings	NHL	11	0	0	0	0	—	—	—	—	—
2018–19	Grand Rapids Griffins	AHL	64	3	24	27	67	5	0	1	1	8
2019–20	Grand Rapids Griffins	AHL	50	2	25	27	18	—	—	—	—	—
2019–20	Detroit Red Wings	NHL	6	0	2	2	2	—	—	—	—	—
2020–21	Grand Rapids Griffins	AHL	32	1	17	18	19	—	—	—	—	—
2021–22	Iowa Wild	AHL	61	12	19	31	35	—	—	—	—	—
2022–23	Iowa Wild	AHL	72	6	42	48	69	2	0	1	1	2
2023–24	Ontario Reign	AHL	30	1	19	20	10	8	1	5	6	4
2024–25	Ontario Reign	AHL	62	3	24	27	47	2	0	0	0	2
2025–26	Ontario Reign	AHL	67	4	17	21	61	5	0	3	3	4
NHL totals			22	0	5	5	4	—	—	—	—	—

=== International ===
Year	Team	Event	Result	GP	G	A	Pts	PIM
2012	Canada	YOG	3rd place, bronze medalist(s)	6	0	5	5	2
2013	Canada Pacific	U17	5th	5	1	5	6	2
2013	Canada	IH18	1st place, gold medalist(s)	5	0	2	2	8
2014	Canada	U18	3rd place, bronze medalist(s)	7	1	3	4	10
2015	Canada	WJC	1st place, gold medalist(s)	7	0	3	3	2
2016	Canada	WJC	6th	5	1	2	3	4
Junior totals				35	3	20	23	28

== Awards and honours ==
Award	Year
WHL
Western Conference Second All-Star Team	2015
Western Conference First All-Star Team	2016
AHL
Calder Cup	2017
