= Otto Nieminen =

Finnish ice hockey player

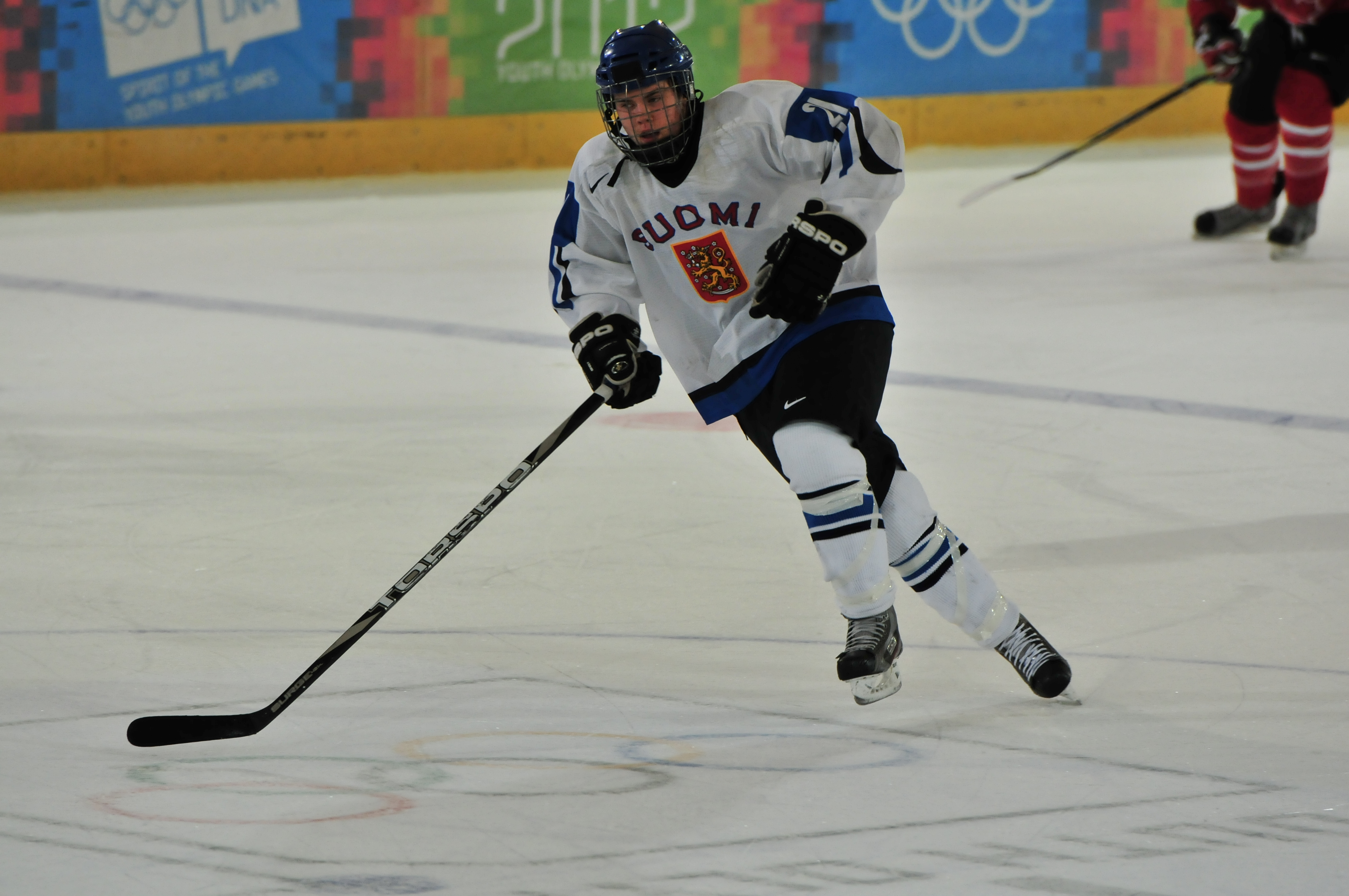
- Otto Nieminen
- Born: 8 May 1996 (age 30) Somero, Finland
- Height: 5 ft 9 in (175 cm)
- Weight: 176 lb (80 kg; 12 st 8 lb)
- Position: Right wing
- Shoots: Left
- EIHL team Former teams: Dundee Stars; HC TPS; SaPKo; TUTO Hockey; Lahti Pelicans; FPS; HK Spišská Nová Ves; Odense Bulldogs; Nottingham Panthers
- NHL draft: Undrafted
- Playing career: 2014–present

Otto Nieminen (born 8 May 1996) is a Finnish ice hockey player. He is currently signed to UK Elite Ice Hockey League (EIHL) side Dundee Stars.

Nieminen made his Liiga debut playing with HC TPS during the 2014–15 season.

== Career statistics ==
=== Regular season and playoffs ===
			Regular season					Playoffs
Season	Team	League	GP	G	A	Pts	PIM	GP	G	A	Pts	PIM
