= Miikka Pitkänen =

Finnish ice hockey player

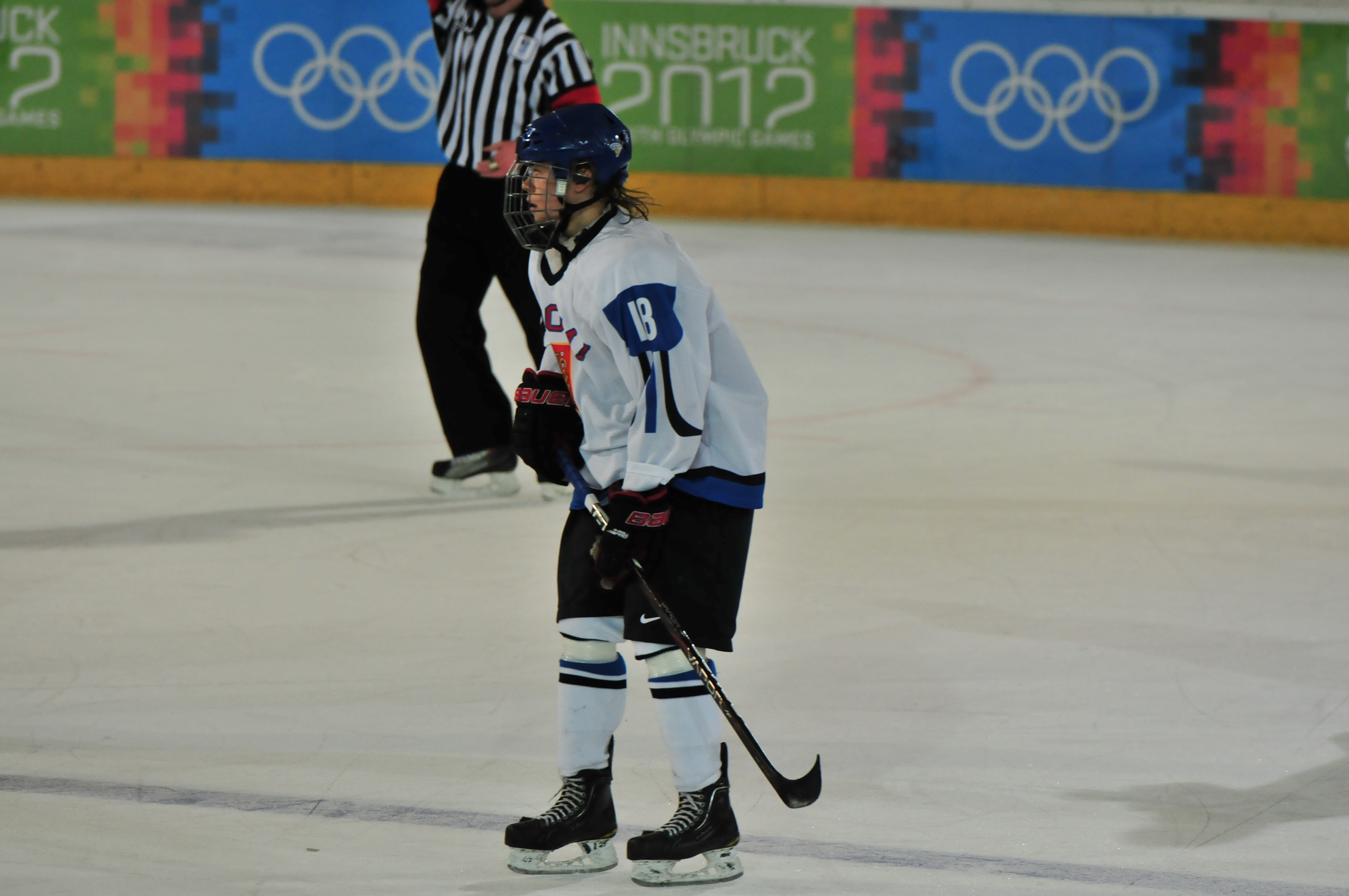
- Born: 27 April 1996 (age 30) Kuopio, Finland
- Height: 5 ft 10 in (178 cm)
- Weight: 171 lb (78 kg; 12 st 3 lb)
- Position: Forward
- Shoots: Left
- EIHL team Former teams: Nottingham Panthers; KalPa; KooKoo; Mikkelin Jukurit; Södertälje SK; Nybro Vikings
- NHL draft: Undrafted
- Playing career: 2013–present

Miikka Pitkänen (born 27 April 1996) is a Finnish ice hockey player. He is currently playing with the Nottingham Panthers in the British Elite Ice Hockey League (EIHL).

Pitkänen made his Liiga debut playing with KalPa during the 2013–14 season.

== Personal life ==
He is married to Swedish footballer Maja Göthberg.
