= Waltteri Hopponen =

Finnish ice hockey player

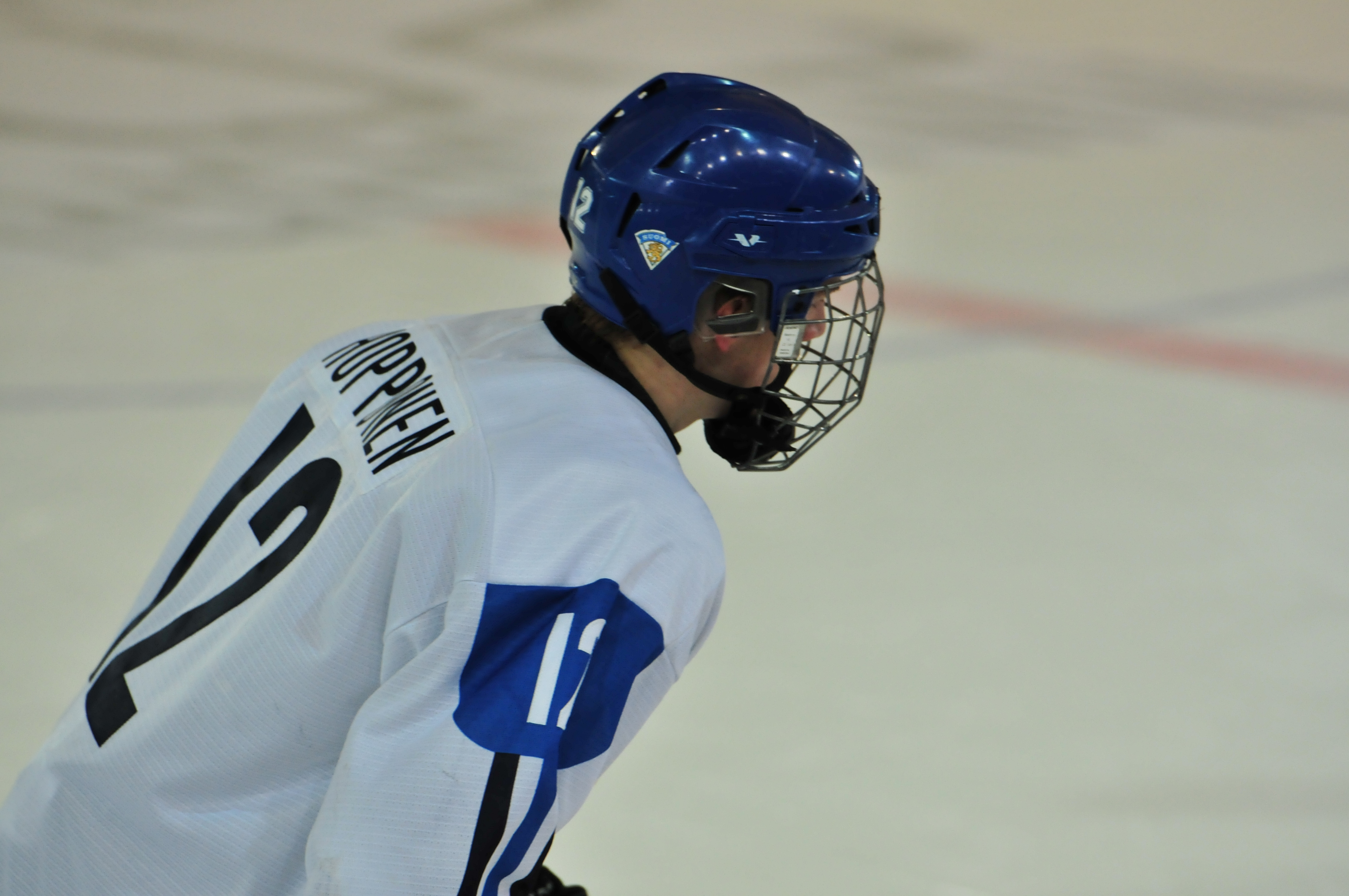
- Born: 4 February 1996 (age 30) Helsinki, Finland
- Height: 187 cm (6 ft 2 in)
- Weight: 89 kg (196 lb; 14 st 0 lb)
- Position: Forward
- Shot: Left
- Played for: HPK
- NHL draft: Undrafted
- Playing career: 2015–2024

Waltteri Hopponen (born 4 February 1996) is a Finnish former ice hockey forward who played for HPK.

== Career statistics ==
=== Regular season and playoffs ===
			Regular season					Playoffs
Season	Team	League	GP	G	A	Pts	PIM	GP	G	A	Pts	PIM
2012–13	Espoo Blues U20	U20 SM-liiga	18	5	3	8	14	—	—	—	—	—
2013–14	Everett Silvertips	WHL	1	0	0	0	2	—	—	—	—	—
2013–14	Sioux City Musketeers	USHL	54	17	14	31	36	3	0	0	0	0
2014–15	Sioux City Musketeers	USHL	28	2	8	10	59	—	—	—	—	—
2014–15	Lincoln Stars	USHL	31	4	14	18	20	—	—	—	—	—
2015–16	HPK U20	U20 SM-liiga	7	7	2	9	4	8	1	2	3	2
2015–16	HPK	Liiga	52	5	9	14	8	—	—	—	—	—
2016–17	HPK U20	U20 SM-liiga	5	3	5	8	2	2	0	1	1	10
2016–17	HPK	Liiga	21	0	1	1	8	—	—	—	—	—
2016–17	LeKi	Mestis	23	6	8	14	12	—	—	—	—	—
2017–18	Espoo United	Mestis	46	5	14	19	42	—	—	—	—	—
2018–19	Peliitat Heinola	Mestis	42	4	9	13	63	4	0	1	1	2
2019–20	Kiekko-Espoo	Suomi-sarja	3	1	6	7	0	—	—	—	—	—
2020–21	TUTO Hockey	Mestis	18	1	6	7	6	—	—	—	—	—
2022–23	Jäähonka	2. Divisioona	20	10	25	35	10	7	4	11	15	16
2023–24	Jäähonka	2. Divisioona	19	8	26	34	49	7	7	2	9	0
Liiga totals			73	5	10	15	16	—	—	—	—	—

=== International ===
Year	Team	Event	GP	G	A	Pts	PIM
2013	Finland U17	WHC-17	5	1	2	3	6
2013	Finland U18	IH18	4	2	0	2	0
2014	Finland U18	WJC-18	5	0	2	2	0
Junior totals			14	3	4	7	6
