= Manu Honkanen =

Finnish ice hockey player

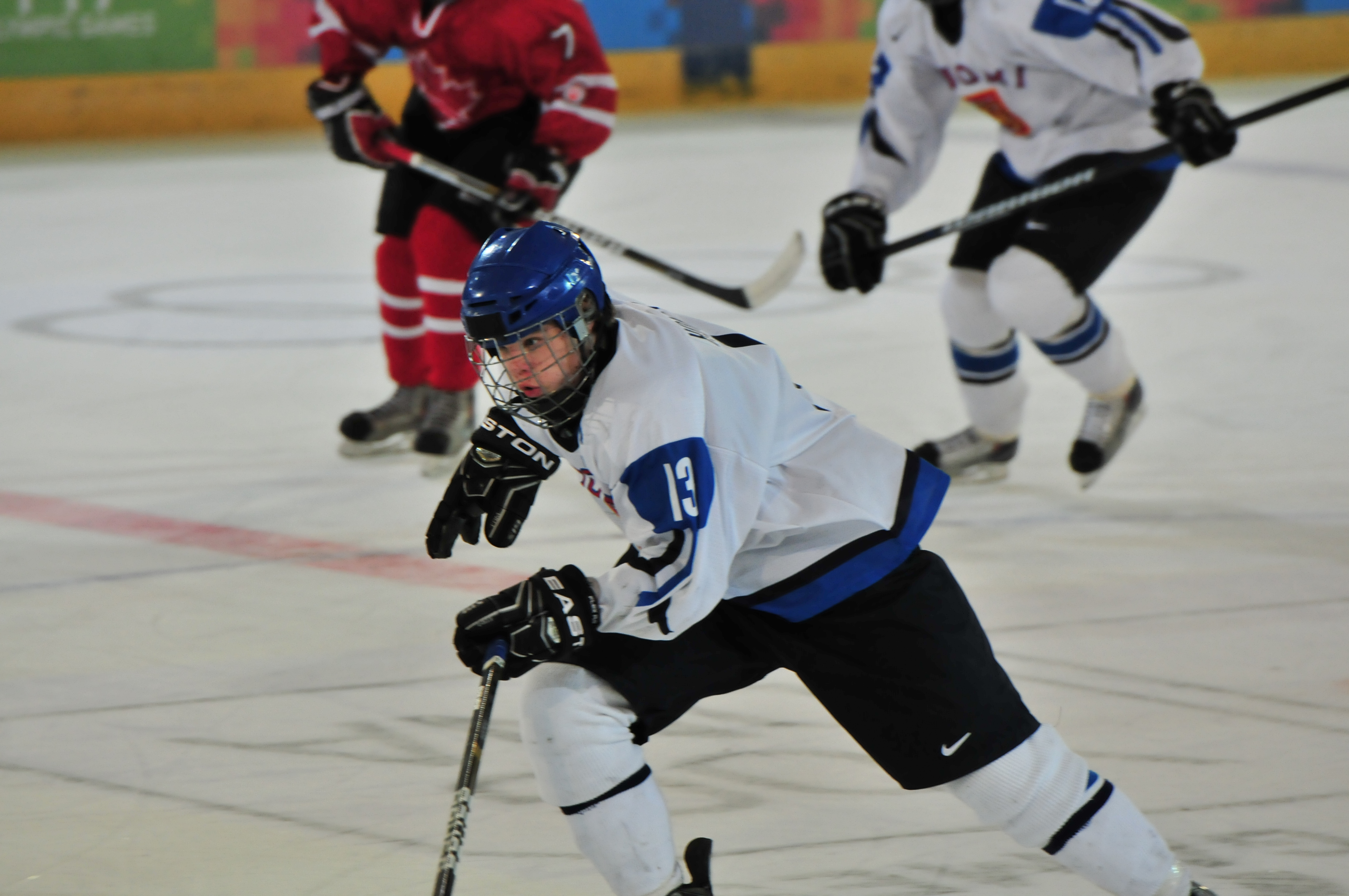
- Born: 29 April 1996 (age 30) Turku, Finland
- Height: 5 ft 11 in (180 cm)
- Weight: 185 lb (84 kg; 13 st 3 lb)
- Position: Forward
- Shoots: Right
- Liiga team Former teams: Tappara; TPS
- Playing career: 2013–present

Manu Honkanen (born 29 April 1996) is a Finnish ice hockey player. He is currently playing with Tappara in the Finnish Liiga.

Honkanen made his Liiga debut playing with HC TPS during the 2013–14 Liiga season.
