= Kaapo Kähkönen =

Finnish ice hockey player (born 1996)

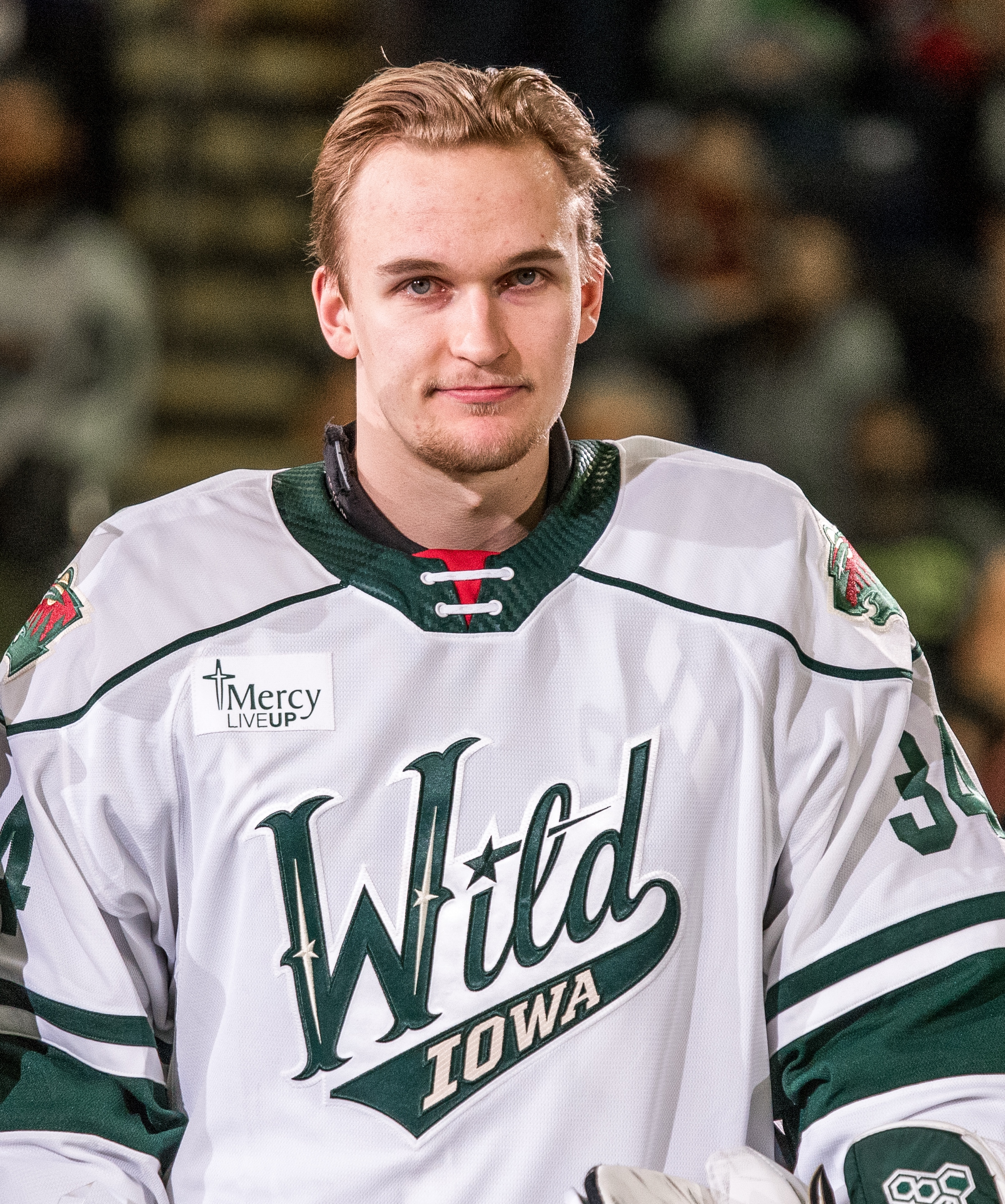
- Kähkönen with the Iowa Wild in 2019
- Born: 16 August 1996 (age 29) Helsinki, Finland
- Height: 6 ft 2 in (188 cm)
- Weight: 217 lb (98 kg; 15 st 7 lb)
- Position: Goaltender
- Catches: Left
- NHL team (P) Cur. team Former teams: Montreal Canadiens; Laval Rocket (AHL); Espoo Blues; Lukko; Minnesota Wild; San Jose Sharks; New Jersey Devils; Colorado Avalanche
- NHL draft: 109th overall, 2014; Minnesota Wild
- Playing career: 2015–present

Kaapo Kähkönen (born 16 August 1996) is a Finnish professional ice hockey goaltender for the Laval Rocket of the American Hockey League (AHL) while under contract to the Montreal Canadiens of the National Hockey League (NHL). He was selected in the fourth round, 109th overall, by the Minnesota Wild in the 2014 NHL entry draft. Kähkönen has also previously played for the San Jose Sharks, New Jersey Devils, and Colorado Avalanche.

== Playing career ==
=== Finland ===
Kähkönen played as a youth in his homeland within the Espoo Blues organization. He made his professional debut on loan to TUTO Hockey of the Mestis in the 2014–15 season before returning to make his Liiga debut with the Blues during the following 2015–16 season.

On 13 April 2016, Kähkönen left the Blues in order to be exposed to more playing time. He agreed to a two-year contract with Lukko.

In the 2017–18 season, Kähkönen produced career best markers in leading the Liiga in games played, minutes and shutouts.

=== North America ===
Upon completion of his two-year pact with Lukko, Kähkönen agreed to a two-year, entry-level contract with his draft club, the Minnesota Wild, on 16 May 2018. In his second year in North America, during the 2019–20 season, Kähkönen was recalled by Minnesota from American Hockey League (AHL) affiliate, the Iowa Wild, on 20 November 2019. After serving as backup for two games, he became just the fourth Minnesota Wild goaltender to be given a start for his NHL debut against the New Jersey Devils at the Prudential Center on 26 November 2019. He made 32 saves, recording his first career victory in a 3–2 win over the Devils. Kähkönen officially conceded his first goal against to Devils' rookie Jesper Boqvist, despite the NHL later admitting error from an incorrect ruling in a coach's challenge review from the Wild.

In the 2020–21 season, Kähkönen became a full-time NHL player, serving as the backup to Cam Talbot. Between 18 February and 16 March 2021, he won nine consecutive games while being a starter, putting up a .947 save percentage and getting two shutouts during the winning streak.

During the 2021–22 season, on 21 March 2022, Kähkönen was dealt at the NHL trade deadline to the San Jose Sharks, in exchange for defenceman Jacob Middleton and a 2022 fifth-round draft selection. As a restricted free agent in the following off-season, Kähkönen was re-signed to a two-year, $5.5 million contract extension with the Sharks on 18 July 2022.

On 8 March 2024, Kähkönen was traded by the Sharks to the New Jersey Devils for Vítek Vaněček and a 2025 seventh-round pick. After backstopping the lowly Sharks, he finished the campaign with an improved .923 save percentage and a 2.51 goals against average (GAA) in six appearances in New Jersey.

On 1 July 2024, Kähkönen signed a one-year, $1 million contract with the Winnipeg Jets. After attending Winnipeg's training camp and preseason, Kähkönen lost out on the backup job to fellow netminder Eric Comrie and was subsequently placed on waivers by the Jets at the commencement of the 2024–25 season. On 11 October, he was claimed off waivers by the Colorado Avalanche. After a lengthy immigration process, in order to regain match fitness, Kähkönen was assigned on a conditioning assignment to Avalanche's AHL affiliate, the Colorado Eagles, on 24 October. He featured in a pair of games with the Eagles, posting a .919 save percentage before returning to the Avalanche on 29 October. Without adding to his debut game with the Avalanche, Kähkönen was placed back on waivers to make room on the roster for the previously suspended Valeri Nichushkin, and was re-claimed by the Winnipeg Jets on 12 November. On 5 March 2025, Kähkönen was subsequently traded to the Florida Panthers, in exchange for Chris Driedger. He did not remain in Florida, and, while the Panthers claimed their second consecutive Stanley Cup victory, he instead joined their AHL affiliate, the Charlotte Checkers, leading the team to the 2025 Calder Cup Finals.

Entering the offseason as an unrestricted free agent, Kähkönen agreed to a one-year contract with the Montreal Canadiens on 1 July 2025.

== International play ==
Medal record

Men's ice hockey

Representing Finland

World Junior Championships
Gold medal – first place	2016 Helsinki	

World U18 Championships
Bronze medal – third place	2013 Sochi	

Kähkönen represented Finland junior team at the 2015 and 2016 World Junior Championships, where the team won gold. In the 2015 tournament, he was the team's third goaltender behind Juuse Saros and Ville Husso, and did not receive any playing time. In 2016, Kähkönen started the tournament as the second goaltender option behind Veini Vehviläinen, but ended up playing more as the tournament progressed. Ultimately Kähkönen who led the team to its fourth gold medal, after being substituted for Vehviläinen against Canada junior team in the second period of the quarterfinals. Kähkönen made 21 saves in a 2–1 win against Sweden junior team in the semifinals, before helping his team beat Russia junior team 4–3 in the gold medal game in overtime, making 22 saves.

== Career statistics ==
=== Regular season and playoffs ===
			Regular season									Playoffs
Season	Team	League	GP	W	L	OT	MIN	GA	SO	GAA	SV%	GP	W	L	MIN	GA	SO	GAA	SV%
2012–13	Espoo Blues	Jr. A	28	—	—	—	1,676	68	4	2.43	.917	12	—	—	628	28	2	2.68	.901
2013–14	Espoo Blues	Jr. A	38	—	—	—	2,279	91	3	2.39	.911	10	—	—	599	21	0	2.10	.915
2014–15	TuTo	Mestis	47	—	—	—	—	92	—	2.11	.925	13	—	—	—	—	—	1.95	.934
2015–16	Espoo Blues	Liiga	27	6	15	5	1,581	71	1	2.69	.908	—	—	—	—	—	—	—	—
2015–16	TuTo	Mestis	1	0	0	0	28	0	0	0.00	1.000	6	—	—	—	18	—	3.03	.885
2016–17	Lukko	Liiga	34	12	12	10	2,020	87	2	2.58	.921	—	—	—	—	—	—	—	—
2017–18	Lukko	Liiga	56	20	23	12	3,275	120	6	2.20	.920	2	0	2	126	5	0	2.38	.921
2018–19	Iowa Wild	AHL	39	17	14	8	2,373	110	6	2.78	.908	—	—	—	—	—	—	—	—
2019–20	Iowa Wild	AHL	34	25	6	3	2,058	71	7	2.07	.927	—	—	—	—	—	—	—	—
2019–20	Minnesota Wild	NHL	5	3	1	1	305	15	0	2.96	.913	—	—	—	—	—	—	—	—
2020–21	Minnesota Wild	NHL	24	16	8	0	1,414	68	2	2.88	.902	—	—	—	—	—	—	—	—
2021–22	Minnesota Wild	NHL	25	12	8	3	1,381	66	0	2.87	.910	—	—	—	—	—	—	—	—
2021–22	San Jose Sharks	NHL	11	2	6	1	566	27	0	2.86	.916	—	—	—	—	—	—	—	—
2022–23	San Jose Sharks	NHL	37	9	20	7	2,107	135	1	3.85	.883	—	—	—	—	—	—	—	—
2023–24	San Jose Sharks	NHL	31	6	20	3	1,651	105	0	3.81	.895	—	—	—	—	—	—	—	—
2023–24	New Jersey Devils	NHL	6	1	4	0	263	11	1	2.51	.923	—	—	—	—	—	—	—	—
2024–25	Colorado Eagles	AHL	2	0	2	0	117	5	0	2.57	.919	—	—	—	—	—	—	—	—
2024–25	Colorado Avalanche	NHL	1	0	1	0	58	4	0	4.12	.800	—	—	—	—	—	—	—	—
2024–25	Manitoba Moose	AHL	22	6	14	1	1,202	66	1	3.29	.885	—	—	—	—	—	—	—	—
2024–25	Charlotte Checkers	AHL	12	8	4	0	705	27	0	2.30	.906	18	12	6	1,128	41	1	2.18	.906
2025–26	Laval Rocket	AHL	38	21	9	7	2,244	102	0	2.73	.895	5	2	3	257	13	1	3.03	.871
Liiga totals			117	38	50	27	6,876	278	9	2.43	.918	2	0	2	126	5	0	2.38	.921
NHL totals			140	49	68	15	7,744	431	4	3.34	.898	—	—	—	—	—	—	—	—

=== International ===
Year	Team	Event	Result	GP	W	L	T	MIN	GA	SO	GAA	SV%
2013	Finland	U17	7th	4	1	3	0	241	18	0	4.48	.858
2013	Finland	U18	3rd place, bronze medalist(s)	—	—	—	—	—	—	—	—	—
2013	Finland	IH18	5th	3	2	1	0	174	10	0	3.45	.881
2014	Finland	U18	6th	5	2	3	0	269	15	0	3.37	.886
2016	Finland	WJC	1st place, gold medalist(s)	4	4	0	0	214	9	0	2.52	.909
Junior totals				17	9	7	0	898	52	0	—	—

== Awards and honours ==
Award	Year	Ref
Mestis
Best Goaltender	2015	
First All-Star Team	2015	
Rookie of the Year	2015	
AHL
All-Star Game	2019	
First All-Star Team	2020	
Aldege "Baz" Bastien Memorial Award	2020	

Awards and achievements
Preceded by Alex Nedeljkovic	Aldege "Baz" Bastien Memorial Award; 2019–20	Succeeded by Logan Thompson
