= Eetu Sopanen =

Finnish ice hockey player

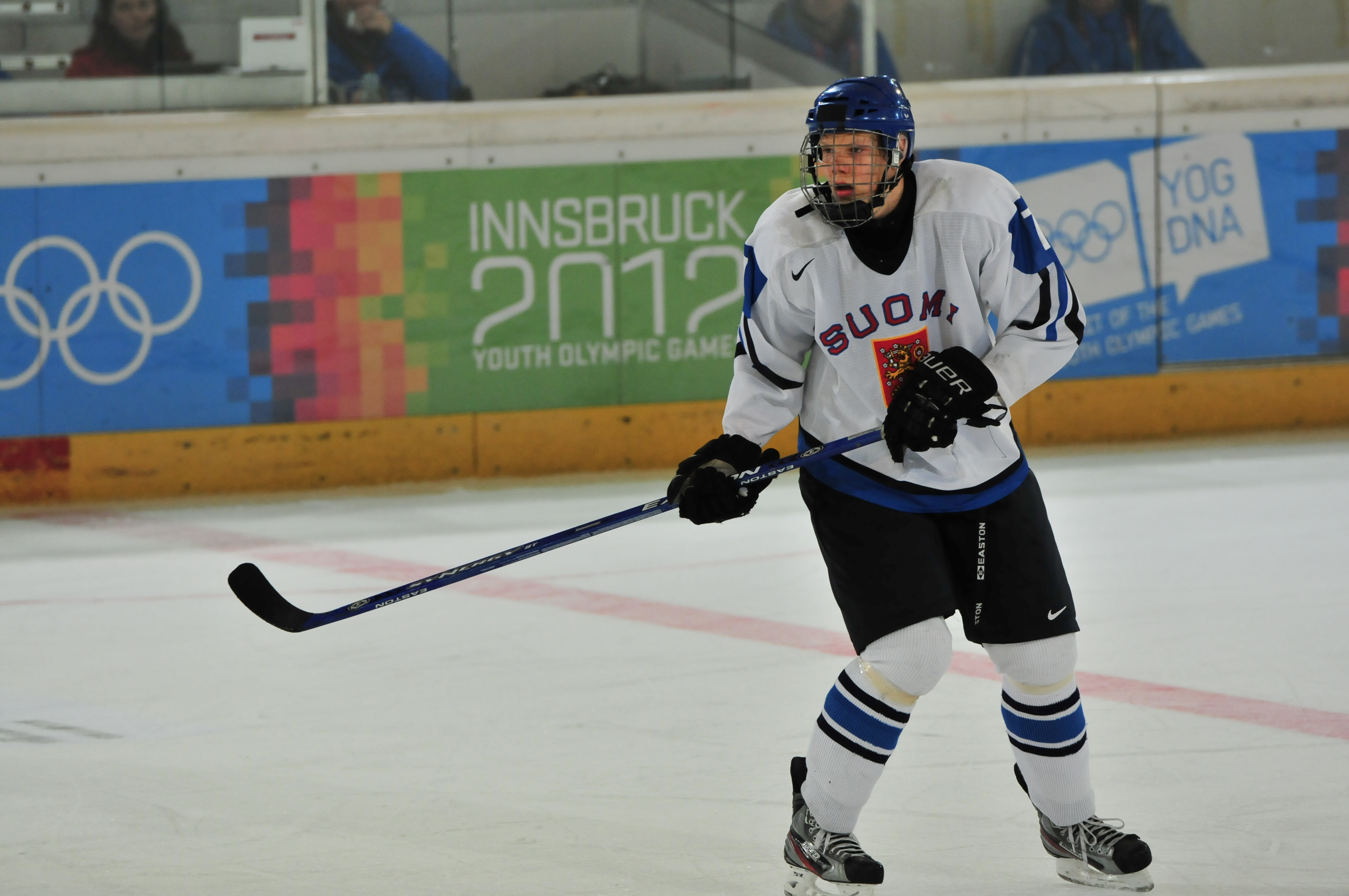
- Eetu Sopanen at the Youth Winter Olympics
- Born: 24 April 1996 (age 30) Kouvola, Finland
- Height: 6 ft 5 in (196 cm)
- Weight: 225 lb (102 kg; 16 st 1 lb)
- Position: Defence
- Shot: Right
- Played for: Lahti Pelicans; KalPa
- NHL draft: Undrafted
- Playing career: 2014–2016

Eetu Sopanen (born 24 April 1996) is a Finnish former ice hockey defenceman. He last played with KalPa in the Finnish Liiga. He was part of Finland's gold medal-winning U20 team at the 2016 World Junior Ice Hockey Championships, however he only got to play three games before suffering a knee injury.

Sopanen made his Liiga debut playing with Lahti Pelicans during the 2014–15 Liiga season. He moved to KalPa for the 2016–17 Liiga season. During a Liiga game between KalPa and SaiPa, Sopanen suffered an injury, falling and hitting his head on his teammate's foot, which forced him to end his career at the age of 20.
