= Adam Brooks (ice hockey) =

Canadian ice hockey player (born 1996)

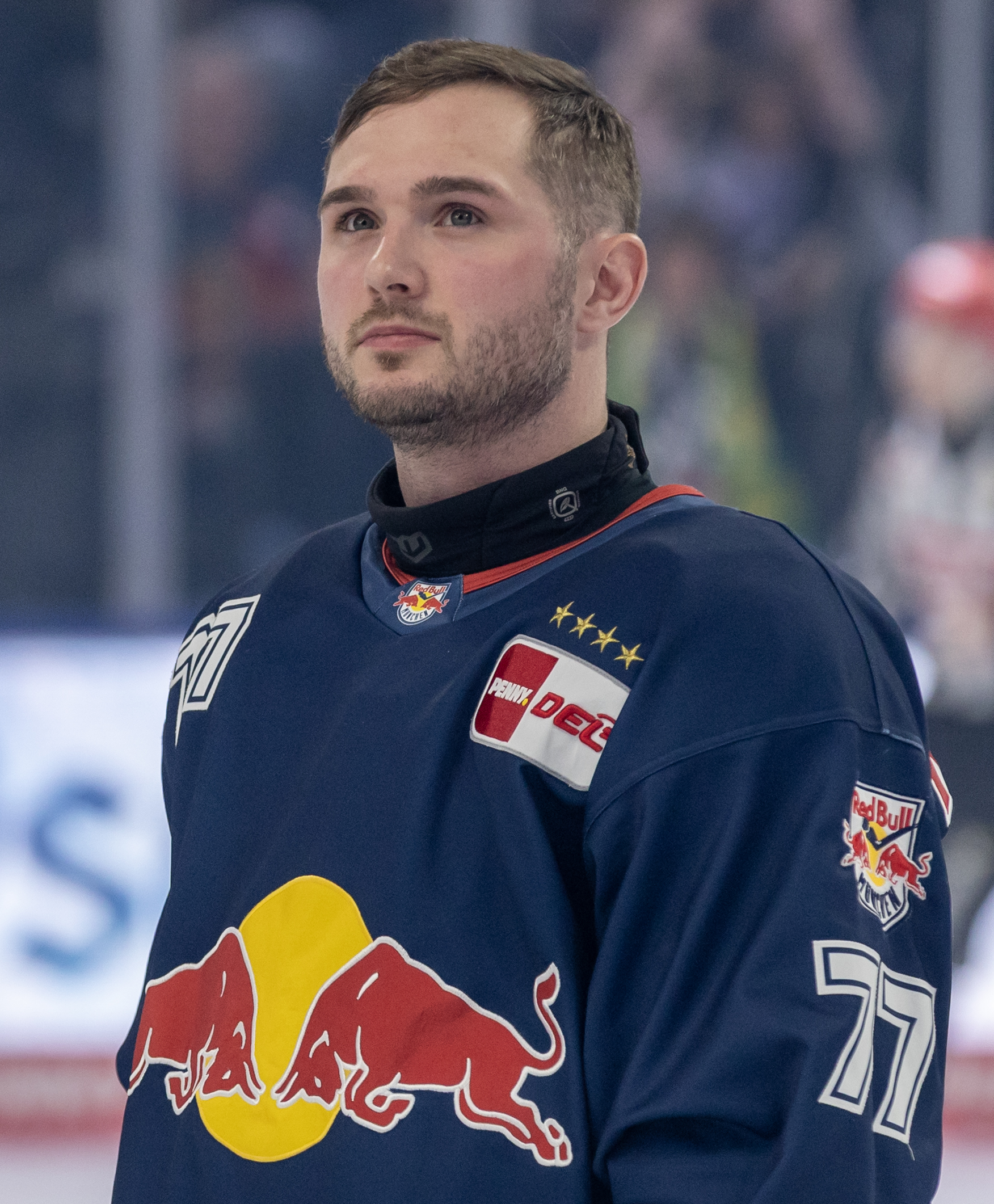
- Brooks with EHC Red Bull München in 2025
- Born: May 6, 1996 (age 30) Winnipeg, Manitoba, Canada
- Height: 5 ft 11 in (180 cm)
- Weight: 176 lb (80 kg; 12 st 8 lb)
- Position: Centre
- Shoots: Left
- DEL team Former teams: EHC München; Toronto Maple Leafs; Montreal Canadiens; Vegas Golden Knights; Winnipeg Jets
- NHL draft: 92nd overall, 2016; Toronto Maple Leafs
- Playing career: 2017–present

Adam Brooks (born May 6, 1996) is a Canadian professional ice hockey centre who is currently playing for EHC Red Bull München of the Deutsche Eishockey Liga (DEL). He was selected in the fourth round, 92nd overall, by the Toronto Maple Leafs of the National Hockey League (NHL) in the 2016 NHL entry draft. Brooks has also previously played for the Montreal Canadiens, Vegas Golden Knights, and Winnipeg Jets.

== Playing career ==
=== Amateur ===
While playing AAA hockey for the Winnipeg Hawks, both Brooks and his older brother Brett attended West Kildonan Collegiate. Brooks ended the season being named AAA Impact Player of the Year and MVP.

Brooks was selected 25th overall by the Regina Pats in the 2011 Western Hockey League (WHL) draft after recording 111 points with the Winnipeg Hawks. He signed with the Pats on August 24, 2011, but was reassigned to the Winnipeg Thrashers in the Manitoba U-18 'AAA' Hockey League. While with the Thrashers, Brooks was selected to play for Team Canada at the 2012 Winter Youth Olympics in Innsbruck Austria. At the conclusion of the 2011–12 season, Brooks recorded 41 points in 37 games, and appeared in the Western Canada Under-16 Challenge.

After only recording 11 points during the 2013–14 season, Brooks was passed over in his first year of eligibility for the NHL entry draft. Prior to the beginning of the new season, the Pats hired Dave Struch and Brooks excelled that season, recording 62 points in 64 games. Despite going undrafted again, Brooks partook in the New York Rangers rookie camp.

His success continued into the following season where Brooks lead the league with 82 assists and 120 points, which earned him the Bob Clarke Trophy. This also earned him a 72nd final ranking from the NHL Central Scouting Bureau amongst North American skaters. By the time the 2016 NHL entry draft came around, Brooks was drafted 92nd overall by the Toronto Maple Leafs. Brooks was named team captain of the Pats to start his final junior year in the 2016–17 WHL season. Although the Pats qualified for the playoffs, Brooks injured his knee in Game 2 of an Eastern Conference semi-final and was out for the rest of the series. At the conclusion of his junior career, Brooks ranked third all-time in regular-season games played with 317, 10th in career points with 335, and sixth in assists with 216. He was also named to the WHL First All-Star team.

=== Professional ===
On June 29, 2017, Brooks was signed to a three-year, entry-level contract with the Toronto Maple Leafs. After attending the Leafs training camp, Brooks was reassigned to their American Hockey League (AHL) affiliate, the Toronto Marlies, to begin the 2017–18 season. Brooks played on a line with Ben Smith and Colin Greening, whom helped him record his first career AHL point in a 4–0 win over the Charlotte Checkers. He later scored his first career AHL goal in a 5–1 win over the Belleville Senators on December 31, 2017. Brooks finished his rookie campaign with the Marlies recording 19 points in 57 regular AHL games, and six points in 20 playoff games to help lead the Marlies to their first Calder Cup in franchise history.

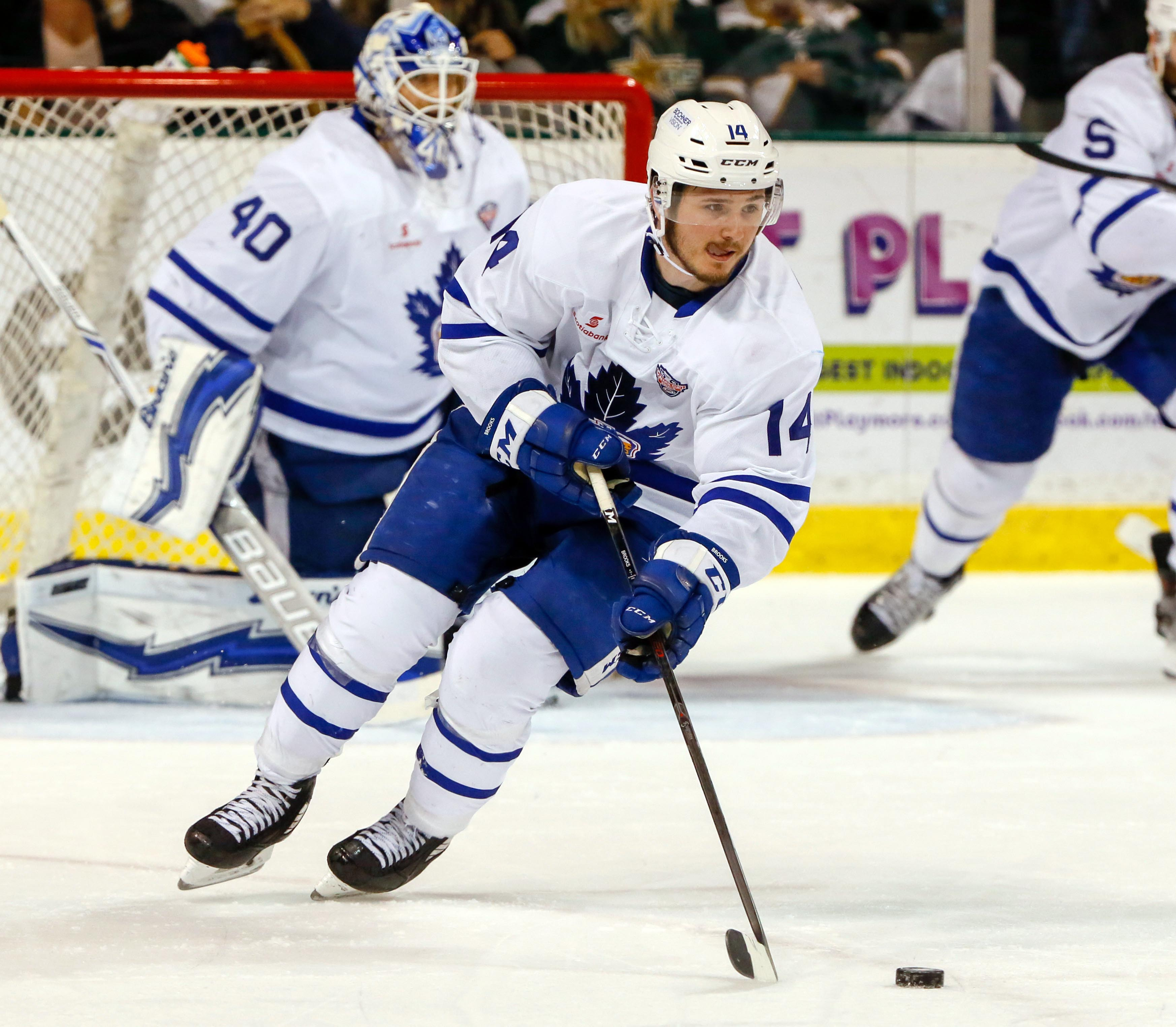
Brooks with the Toronto Marlies in 2018

After attending the Leafs training camp, Brooks was reassigned to the Marlies for the 2018–19 AHL season. The Marlies qualified for the 2019 Calder Cup playoffs, where Brooks recorded a hat trick to sweep the Marlies past the Rochester Americans. Brooks played his first NHL game against the New York Rangers on December 28, 2019. Brooks finished the season with 3 points in 7 games with the Maple Leafs and 9 goals and 20 points in 29 games for the Marlies. He re-signed with the Maple Leafs to a two-year, two-way contract in May 2020. On January 22, 2021, Brooks scored his first NHL goal with the Maple Leafs on Mikko Koskinen of the Edmonton Oilers. He finished the season with 5 points in 11 games with the Maple Leafs.

On October 10, 2021, prior to the 2021–22 season, Brooks was placed on waivers by the Maple Leafs as part of pre-season roster cuts. He was subsequently claimed by the Montreal Canadiens the following day. He appeared in four games with the Canadiens. Brooks was placed back on waivers by Montreal on November 16, 2021; the following day, he was claimed by the Vegas Golden Knights. Brooks played in seven games for the Golden Knights, scoring two goals. On February 15, 2022, Brooks was placed on waivers by the Golden Knights, and subsequently re-claimed by Toronto the next day. However, on February 17, Toronto placed Brooks on waivers again; the following day, he was claimed by the Winnipeg Jets. He finished the season with 14 games played for the Jets.

On July 13, 2022, Brooks was signed as a free agent to a two-year, two-way contract with the Philadelphia Flyers.

On July 15, 2024, Brooks signed with EHC Red Bull München of the Deutsche Eishockey Liga.

== Career statistics ==
=== Regular season and playoffs ===
			Regular season					Playoffs
Season	Team	League	GP	G	A	Pts	PIM	GP	G	A	Pts	PIM
2011–12	Winnipeg Thrashers	MMHL	37	17	24	41	6	7	1	3	4	0
2012–13	Regina Pats	WHL	55	4	8	12	13	—	—	—	—	—
2013–14	Regina Pats	WHL	60	4	7	11	24	4	0	1	1	0
2014–15	Regina Pats	WHL	64	30	32	62	18	9	4	3	7	6
2015–16	Regina Pats	WHL	72	38	82	120	30	12	7	16	23	6
2016–17	Regina Pats	WHL	66	43	87	130	61	17	5	13	18	12
2017–18	Toronto Marlies	AHL	57	8	11	19	2	20	2	4	6	4
2018–19	Toronto Marlies	AHL	61	21	19	40	28	13	6	2	8	6
2019–20	Toronto Marlies	AHL	29	9	11	20	19	—	—	—	—	—
2019–20	Toronto Maple Leafs	NHL	7	0	3	3	0	—	—	—	—	—
2020–21	Toronto Maple Leafs	NHL	11	4	1	5	0	2	0	0	0	2
2020–21	Toronto Marlies	AHL	17	4	9	13	6	—	—	—	—	—
2021–22	Montreal Canadiens	NHL	4	0	1	1	0	—	—	—	—	—
2021–22	Vegas Golden Knights	NHL	7	2	0	2	2	—	—	—	—	—
2021–22	Henderson Silver Knights	AHL	5	0	3	3	0	—	—	—	—	—
2021–22	Winnipeg Jets	NHL	14	0	0	0	0	—	—	—	—	—
2022–23	Lehigh Valley Phantoms	AHL	54	10	25	35	31	3	1	2	3	2
2023–24	Lehigh Valley Phantoms	AHL	47	13	12	25	12	6	1	2	3	0
2024–25	EHC München	DEL	27	10	11	21	10	6	1	0	1	4
NHL totals			43	6	5	11	2	2	0	0	0	2

=== International ===
Year	Team	Event	Result	GP	G	A	Pts	PIM
2013	Canada Western	U17	9th	5	1	0	1	2
Junior totals				5	1	0	1	2

== Awards and honours ==
Award or Honour	Year
WHL
First All-Star Team (East)	2016
Bob Clarke Trophy	2016
WHL First All-Star Team	2017
AHL
Calder Cup (Toronto Marlies)	2018
