= Shane Gersich =

American ice hockey player (born 1996)

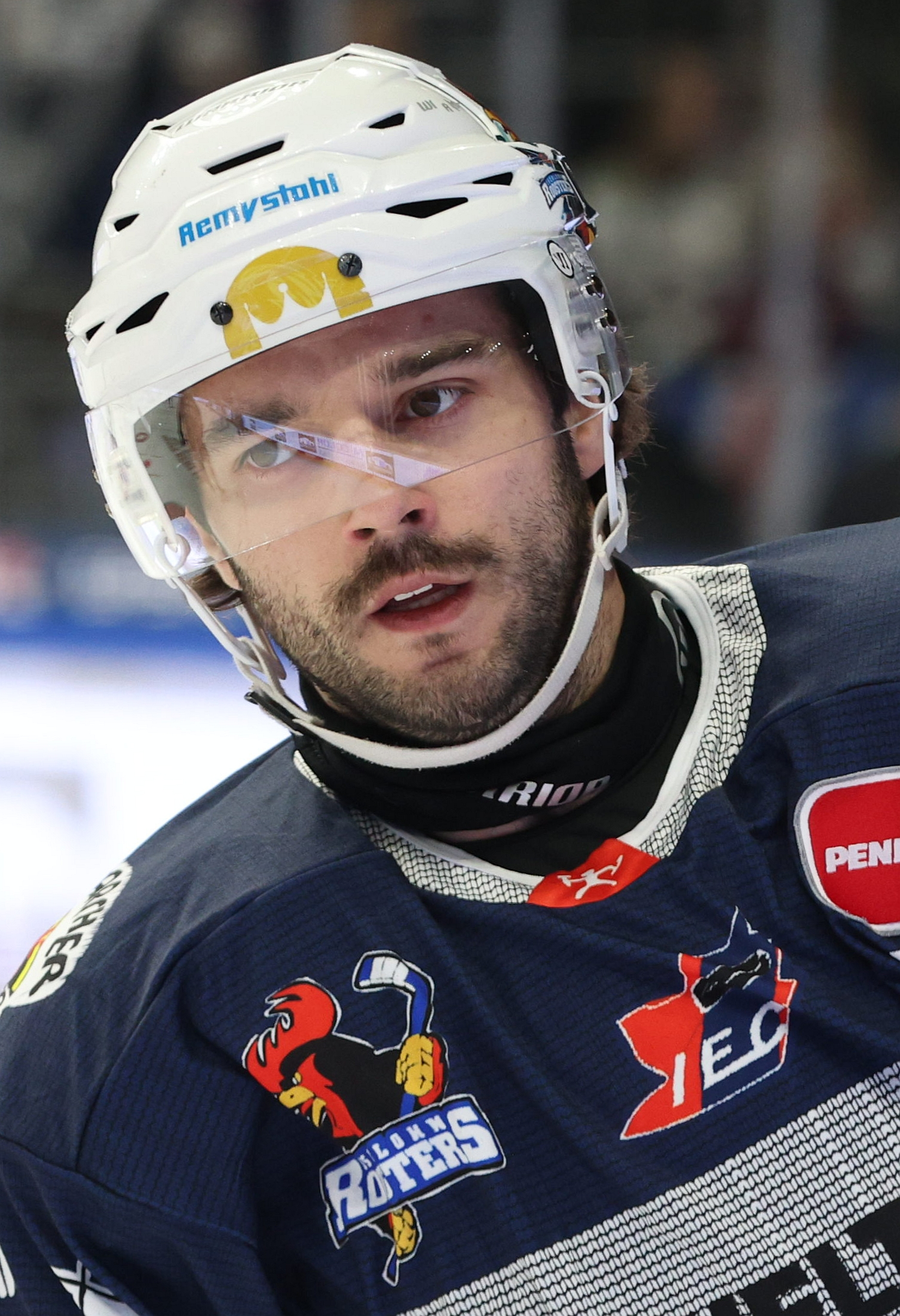
- Gersich with the Iserlohn Roosters in 2024
- Born: July 10, 1996 (age 30) Chaska, Minnesota, U.S.
- Height: 5 ft 11 in (180 cm)
- Weight: 185 lb (84 kg; 13 st 3 lb)
- Position: Left wing
- Shoots: Left
- ICEHL team Former teams: HC Bolzano; Washington Capitals; Hershey Bears; Västerås IK; Iserlohn Roosters
- NHL draft: 134th overall, 2014; Washington Capitals
- Playing career: 2018–present

Shane Gersich (born July 10, 1996) is an American professional ice hockey winger who currently plays for HC Bolzano of the ICE Hockey League (ICEHL). Gersich was selected 134th overall by the Washington Capitals at the 2014 NHL entry draft.

== Early life ==
Gersich was born on July 10, 1996, in Chaska, Minnesota, to parents Frank and Sharlene. He was born into a hockey playing family, as his uncles Neal, Aaron, and Paul Broten all played in the National Hockey League (NHL).

== Playing career ==
=== Amateur ===
Gersich attended Holy Family Catholic High in Minnesota before moving to the United States Hockey League with the Omaha Lancers and the U.S. National Team Development Program (NTDP). He was recruited to enrol at Holy Family Catholic in the eighth grade by coach Noel Rahn with the aim of leading the fledgeling program rather than joining an established one. As an eighth grader, Gersich tallied 16 goals and 23 assists through the 2010–11 Minnesota State High School League regular season. Due to the hockey teams' success, Holy Family Catholic opted to move from Class 1A to 2A for the 2011–12 season. He was also selected to represent Team USA at the inaugural Winter Youth Olympic Games. As a freshman at Holy Family Catholic, Gersich accumulated 30 goals and 30 assists and was subsequently offered an opportunity to play with the USA Hockey National Team Development Program for the 2012–13 season. However, he turned down the offer and was drafted first overall by the Omaha Lancers in the 2012 United States Hockey League Futures Draft. During the summer following the draft, Gersich again represented Team USA at the international level to help them win gold at the U-17 Five Nations tournament. Although he injured his shoulder during the tournament, Gersich skated with Team Southwest in the Upper Midwest High School Elite Hockey League but sat out the final several weeks of the season.

Gersich returned to Holy Family Catholic for his sophomore year in the 2012–13 season. By December 2012, he shared the scoring lead with six goals and nine assists for 15 points through seven games. As such, he was recruited by numerous Division 1 programs before committing to a collegiate career with the University of North Dakota of the National Collegiate Hockey Conference (NCHC). He finished the season with 28 assists and 34 assists for 62 points through 24 games. During the season, Gersich also played six games with the Omaha Lancers where he recorded one goal before choosing to join the NTDP for the 2013–14 season. Following this, he was also invited to participate in the second annual CCM/USA Hockey All-American Prospects Game.

Upon joining the NTDP, Gersich continued to flourish and quickly accumulated 14 goals and 27 points by March 2014. He credited his easy transition to the coaching of Danton Cole and John Gruden. Upon graduating from the University of Nebraska High School, Gersich was drafted in the fifth round, 134th overall, by the Washington Capitals in the 2014 NHL entry draft. Following the draft, he spent the entirety of the 2014–15 season with the Omaha Lancers, where he quickly flourished. By February 2015, Gersich led the team with 24 goals in 39 games, to rank sixth in the USHL.

=== Collegiate ===
Following his first full season with the Lancers, Gersich began his collegiate career with the North Dakota Fighting Hawks men's ice hockey team while majoring in communication. Upon joining the team, Gersich made an immediate impact during their exhibition games as he scored twice in 12 seconds to earn the Fighting Hawks a win over Manitoba. He then scored his first collegiate goal in the team's home opener against Lake Superior State. As his freshman season continued, Gersich ranked third among UND freshmen with nine goals through 37 games as he helped lead the team the national championship.

=== Professional ===
Following his junior season with the Fighting Hawks in 2017–18, Gersich signed a two-year, entry-level contract with the Washington Capitals on March 23, 2018. He immediately joined the Capitals roster for the remainder of the season and made his professional debut, going scoreless, in a 3–2 overtime victory over the New York Rangers on March 28, 2018. Despite going scoreless in his debut, Gersich earned his first NHL point in his third NHL game on April 7, in a 5–3 win over the New Jersey Devils. After Tom Wilson was suspended in the second round of the 2018 Stanley Cup playoffs, Gersich played in Games 4 and 5 against the Pittsburgh Penguins en route to the Capitals winning the Stanley Cup.

Following their Stanley Cup run, the Capitals re-signed Gersich to a one-year, two-way contract with a cap hit of $700,000.

Out of contract with the Capitals following the 2021–22 season, Gersich opted to remain within the organization in signing a one-year AHL contract with the Hershey Bears on August 25, 2022. In the 2022–23 season, Gersich added 9 goals and 23 points through 53 regular season games. He featured in 6 postseason games with the Bears to help the club claim their 12th Calder Cup Championship.

Following five seasons with the Bears, Gersich signed his first contract abroad in agreeing to a one-year deal with Swedish second tier club, Västerås IK of the HockeyAllsvenskan, on June 23, 2023.

== Career statistics ==
=== Regular season and playoffs ===
			Regular season					Playoffs
Season	Team	League	GP	G	A	Pts	PIM	GP	G	A	Pts	PIM
2010–11	Holy Family Catholic	USHS	23	16	23	39	20	2	0	2	2	0
2011–12	Holy Family Catholic	USHS	20	30	30	60	21	1	0	0	0	0
2012–13	Holy Family Catholic	USHS	24	28	34	62	35	1	0	0	0	2
2012–13	Omaha Lancers	USHL	6	1	0	1	19	—	—	—	—	—
2013–14	U.S. National Development Team	USHL	26	8	8	16	4	—	—	—	—	—
2014–15	Omaha Lancers	USHL	52	27	23	50	32	3	1	1	2	0
2015–16	U. of North Dakota	NCHC	37	9	2	11	16	—	—	—	—	—
2016–17	U. of North Dakota	NCHC	40	21	16	37	20	—	—	—	—	—
2017–18	U. of North Dakota	NCHC	40	13	16	29	18	—	—	—	—	—
2017–18	Washington Capitals	NHL	3	0	1	1	0	2	0	0	0	0
2018–19	Hershey Bears	AHL	66	8	16	24	57	9	1	2	3	6
2019–20	Hershey Bears	AHL	54	10	8	18	24	—	—	—	—	—
2020–21	Hershey Bears	AHL	33	6	8	14	39	—	—	—	—	—
2021–22	Hershey Bears	AHL	71	14	20	34	60	—	—	—	—	—
2022–23	Hershey Bears	AHL	53	9	14	23	16	6	1	0	1	0
2023–24	Västerås IK	Allsv	48	19	13	32	10	—	—	—	—	—
2024–25	Iserlohn Roosters	DEL	51	16	21	37	38	—	—	—	—	—
NHL totals			3	0	1	1	0	2	0	0	0	0

=== International ===
Year	Team	Event	Result	GP	G	A	Pts	PIM
2012	United States	U16		6	3	1	4	6
2014	United States	U18	1st place, gold medalist(s)	7	0	0	0	2
Junior totals				13	3	1	4	8

== Awards and honors ==
Award	Year
College
NCHC Honorable Mention All-Star Team	2017
AHL
Calder Cup	2023
