= Markus Haapanen =

Finnish ice hockey player

- Born: 28 January 1996 (age 30) Hämeenlinna, Finland
- Height: 5 ft 10 in (178 cm)
- Weight: 179 lb (81 kg; 12 st 11 lb)
- Position: Defence
- Shoots: Left
- Hockeytvåan team Former teams: GKS Hockey; HPK
- NHL draft: Undrafted
- Playing career: 2014–present

Markus Haapanen (born 28 January 1996) is a Finnish ice hockey defenceman. He is currently playing with GKS Hockey in the Hockeytvåan, the fourth-tier league in Sweden.

Haapanen made his Liiga debut playing with HPK during the 2014–15 Liiga season and went on to play in nine regular season games for the team.
