= Joel Kiviranta =

Finnish ice hockey player (born 1996)

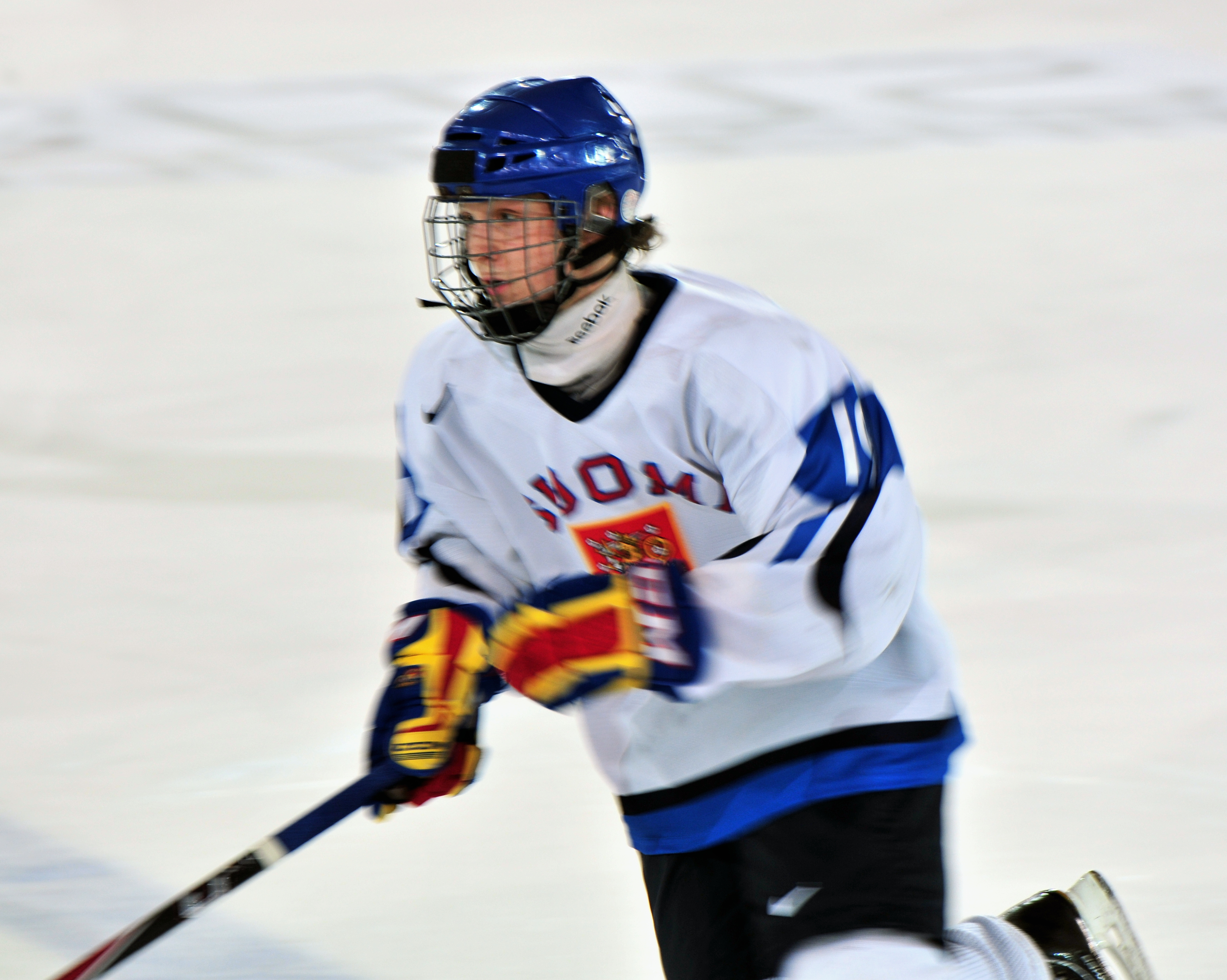
- Kiviranta with Finland in 2012
- Born: March 23, 1996 (age 30) Vantaa, Finland
- Height: 5 ft 11 in (180 cm)
- Weight: 185 lb (84 kg; 13 st 3 lb)
- Position: Forward
- Shoots: Left
- NHL team Former teams: Dallas Stars; Jokerit; Vaasan Sport; Colorado Avalanche
- National team: Finland
- NHL draft: Undrafted
- Playing career: 2013–present

Joel Kiviranta (born March 23, 1996) is a Finnish professional ice hockey player who is a forward for the Dallas Stars of the National Hockey League (NHL).

== Playing career ==
On 12 November 2013, Kiviranta made his Liiga debut playing with Jokerit against the Espoo Blues during the 2013–14 Liiga season.

In the 2018–19 Liiga season, his fifth year with Vaasan Sport, Kiviranta tallied 31 points in 48 games. His 16 goals were third on the team however he was unable to propel Sport to the post-season.

Undrafted, Kiviranta used his NHL-out clause with Sport to sign a two-year, entry-level contract with the Dallas Stars on 1 June 2019. His first NHL goal was an even-strength goal against the New Jersey Devils on 1 February 2020, against the goaltender Louis Domingue to give the Dallas Stars a 2–1 lead, and they went on to win the game in overtime 3–2.

On 4 September 2020, Kiviranta, who was called up as a Black Ace for the Stars, substituted in for injured Stars forward Andrew Cogliano in the seventh and decisive game of the Second Round of the 2020 Stanley Cup playoffs against the Colorado Avalanche. He helped send the Stars into the Conference Finals by scoring a hat-trick, including the game-winning overtime goal.

On 31 July 2021, the Stars re-signed Kiviranta to a two-year, $2.1 million contract extension.

On 28 August 2023, Kiviranta agreed to a professional tryout with the Avalanche to attend their 2023 training camp. He was released from the agreement on 5 October, but was invited to attend the training camp of the Avalanche's American Hockey League (AHL) affiliate, the Colorado Eagles. On 11 October, the Eagles signed Kiviranta to a one-year contract. He began the 2023–24 season with six points in ten games. On 12 November, the Avalanche signed Kiviranta to a one-year, two-way contract worth $775,000. He made his debut for the team on 15 November, recording one goal and two assists in an 8–2 win over the Anaheim Ducks. Despite the initial offensive outburst, Kiviranta settled into a fourth-line utility role, and continued with the Avalanche for the remainder of the season, finishing with 3 goals and 9 points through 56 regular season appearances. In the playoffs, Kiviranta was originally slated to be a healthy scratch, however was inserted into the lineup through injury to Jonathan Drouin. Known to elevate his game in the post-season, he added a goal and assist through the first-round series win over the Winnipeg Jets. He finished with 8 appearances as the Avalanche fell to his former club, the Dallas Stars, in the second round.

As a pending free agent, Kiviranta was re-signed by the Avalanche to a one-year, $775,000 contract for the 2024–25 season on 1 July 2024. He suited up in 79 regular-season games and set career highs with 16 goals and 23 points while and notching his first two career game-winning goals. Kiviranta also registered his first three career multi-goal performances, two of which took place in the month of December. Among them was Kiviranta's first career regular-season hat trick in a 5–2 victory against the Seattle Kraken on 22 December 2024.

Kiviranta made his 100th regular season appearance with the Avalanche on 11 January 2025, and in the post-season he registered 1 assist through 7 games in suffering a playoff exit to his former club, the Dallas Stars, for the second consecutive season.

Having completed his contract, Kiviranta was un-signed after a month into free-agency before opting to return for a third year with the Avalanche in re-signing to a one-year, $1.25 million contract for the 2025–26 season on 8 August 2025.

On 1 July 2026, Kiviranta left the Avalanche as a free agent and returned to the Dallas Stars for the 2026–27 season in agreeing to a one-year, $1 million contract.

== International play ==
Medal record

Ice hockey

Representing Finland

Olympic Games
| Bronze medal – third place | 2026 Milano Cortina | |

World Championships
| Gold medal – first place | 2019 Slovakia | |

Kiviranta was selected to make his senior international debut with Finland at the 2019 IIHF World Championship held in Bratislava, Slovakia. He finished with 2 goals and 3 points in 9 games to help Finland claim the gold medal in a victory over Canada on May 26, 2019.

He represented Finland at the 2026 Winter Olympics and won a bronze medal.

== Career statistics ==
=== Regular season and playoffs ===
| | | | Regular season | | | | | Playoffs |
| Season | Team | League | GP | G | A | Pts | PIM | GP | G | A | Pts | PIM |
|---|---|---|---|---|---|---|---|---|---|---|---|---|
| 2011–12 | Jokerit | FIN U18 | 10 | 2 | 4 | 6 | 0 | 4 | 2 | 0 | 2 | 2 |
| 2011–12 | Jokerit | FIN U20 | 20 | 4 | 1 | 5 | 4 | — | — | — | — | — |
| 2012–13 | Jokerit | FIN U18 | 1 | 1 | 0 | 1 | 2 | 10 | 4 | 2 | 6 | 2 |
| 2012–13 | Jokerit | FIN U20 | 40 | 7 | 13 | 20 | 35 | — | — | — | — | — |
| 2013–14 | Jokerit | FIN U18 | 2 | 1 | 2 | 3 | 0 | 9 | 2 | 6 | 8 | 12 |
| 2013–14 | Jokerit | FIN U20 | 38 | 18 | 19 | 37 | 40 | 4 | 0 | 0 | 0 | 0 |
| 2013–14 | Jokerit | Liiga | 1 | 0 | 0 | 0 | 2 | — | — | — | — | — |
| 2014–15 | Sport | FIN U20 | 6 | 5 | 0 | 5 | 6 | — | — | — | — | — |
| 2014–15 | Sport | Liiga | 47 | 8 | 5 | 13 | 10 | — | — | — | — | — |
| 2015–16 | Sport | FIN U20 | 1 | 1 | 1 | 2 | 0 | — | — | — | — | — |
| 2015–16 | Sport | Liiga | 48 | 6 | 6 | 12 | 22 | 2 | 0 | 0 | 0 | 0 |
| 2015–16 | Hermes | Mestis | 1 | 0 | 1 | 1 | 2 | — | — | — | — | — |
| 2016–17 | Sport | Liiga | 58 | 11 | 10 | 21 | 20 | — | — | — | — | — |
| 2017–18 | Sport | Liiga | 59 | 19 | 18 | 37 | 24 | — | — | — | — | — |
| 2018–19 | Sport | Liiga | 48 | 16 | 15 | 31 | 18 | — | — | — | — | — |
| 2019–20 | Texas Stars | AHL | 48 | 12 | 11 | 23 | 25 | — | — | — | — | — |
| 2019–20 | Dallas Stars | NHL | 11 | 1 | 0 | 1 | 4 | 14 | 5 | 1 | 6 | 4 |
| 2020–21 | Dallas Stars | NHL | 26 | 6 | 5 | 11 | 6 | — | — | — | — | — |
| 2021–22 | Dallas Stars | NHL | 56 | 1 | 6 | 7 | 10 | 7 | 0 | 1 | 1 | 4 |
| 2022–23 | Dallas Stars | NHL | 70 | 8 | 1 | 9 | 40 | 15 | 1 | 4 | 5 | 2 |
| 2023–24 | Colorado Eagles | AHL | 10 | 2 | 4 | 6 | 8 | — | — | — | — | — |
| 2023–24 | Colorado Avalanche | NHL | 56 | 3 | 6 | 9 | 12 | 8 | 1 | 1 | 2 | 4 |
| 2024–25 | Colorado Avalanche | NHL | 79 | 16 | 7 | 23 | 20 | 7 | 0 | 0 | 0 | 2 |
| 2025–26 | Colorado Avalanche | NHL | 51 | 3 | 6 | 9 | 8 | 5 | 0 | 0 | 0 | 0 |
| Liiga totals | | | 261 | 60 | 54 | 114 | 96 | 2 | 0 | 0 | 0 | 0 |
| NHL totals | | | 349 | 38 | 31 | 69 | 100 | 56 | 7 | 7 | 14 | 16 |

=== International ===
| Year | Team | Event | Result | GP | G | A | Pts | PIM |
|---|---|---|---|---|---|---|---|---|
| 2012 | Finland | IH18 | 2nd place, silver medalist(s) | 5 | 0 | 0 | 0 | 0 |
| 2013 | Finland | U17 | 7th | 5 | 2 | 2 | 4 | 0 |
| 2013 | Finland | WJC18 | 3rd place, bronze medalist(s) | 7 | 0 | 0 | 0 | 0 |
| 2013 | Finland | IH18 | 5th | 4 | 2 | 1 | 3 | 4 |
| 2014 | Finland | WJC18 | 6th | 5 | 1 | 0 | 1 | 18 |
| 2019 | Finland | WC | 1st place, gold medalist(s) | 9 | 2 | 1 | 3 | 0 |
| 2026 | Finland | OG | 3rd place, bronze medalist(s) | 5 | 2 | 0 | 2 | 0 |
| Junior totals | | | | 26 | 5 | 3 | 8 | 22 |
| Senior totals | | | | 14 | 4 | 1 | 5 | 0 |
