= Figure skating at the 2012 Winter Youth Olympics – Team trophy =

Team Mixed NOC at the I Winter Youth Olympic Games
- Venue: Olympiahalle
- Dates: January 15; January 17
- Competitors: 16 from 15 nations

The mixed NOC team figure skating competition of the 2012 Winter Youth Olympics was held at the Olympiahalle in Innsbruck. The eight teams were composed of one men's single skater, one ladies' single skater, and one ice dancing duo, each performing a free program or free dance. Pairs were not included due to the low number of entries (five pairs total).

== Teams ==
The skaters who took part the team trophy was determined by draw. The result of the draw was that none of the ladies' medalists, Elizaveta Tuktamysheva, Adelina Sotnikova and Li Zijun, could take part in this competition.

Mixed NOC teams
Team name	Members	Event
Team 1 TM1	(Russia) Feodosi Efremenkov (Switzerland) Tina Stuerzinger (United Kingdom) Millie Paterson / Edward Carstairs	Men; Ladies; Ice dancing
Team 2 TM2	(Ukraine) Yaroslav Paniot (Finland) Eveliina Viljanen (Russia) Maria Simonova / Dmitri Dragun	Men; Ladies; Ice dancing
Team 3 TM3	(Italy) Carlo Vittorio Palermo (France) Anais Ventard (Czech Republic) Jana Čejková / Alexandr Sinicyn	Men; Ladies; Ice dancing
Team 4 TM4	(Japan) Shoma Uno (United States) Jordan Bauth (Belarus) Eugenia Tkachenka / Yuri Hulitski	Men; Ladies; Ice dancing
Team 5 TM5	(Finland) Tino Olenius (Sweden) Myrtel Saldeen Olofsson (Russia) Anna Yanovskaya / Sergey Mozgov	Men; Ladies; Ice dancing
Team 6 TM6	(Kazakhstan) Alexander Lyan (South Korea) Park So-youn (France) Estelle Elizabeth / Romain Le Gac	Men; Ladies; Ice dancing
Team 7 TM7	(South Korea) Lee June-hyoung (Italy) Micol Cristini (Estonia) Victoria-Laura Lõhmus / Andrei Davõdov	Men; Ladies; Ice dancing
Team 8 TM8	(France) Timofei Novaikin (Estonia) Sindra Kriisa (Ukraine) Oleksandra Nazarova / Maxim Nikitin	Men; Ladies; Ice dancing

== Results ==
Due to a tie between the two top ranked teams, a tie breaking procedure was used, taking into consideration the two best places of the concerned teams in different categories. The highest total points from the two best places prevailed and the respective placings was recorded accordingly. In the case of the ties for 4th rank by overall points, the three best places in different categories was considered and the highest total scores from the three best places prevailed and the respective placings was recorded accordingly.

Pl.	Name	Men	Ladies	Ice dance	Total scores	Total points
1	Team 4 TM4	7	7	2	234.92	16
2	Team 2 TM2	4	6	6	237.35	16
3	Team 6 TM6	1	8	5	224.17	14
4	Team 8 TM8	5	1	7	236.52	13
5	Team 1 TM1	8	4	1	234.61	13
6	Team 5 TM5	3	2	8	231.21	13
7	Team 7 TM7	6	3	3	220.50	12
8	Team 3 TM3	2	5	4	206.52	11

== Detailed results ==
=== Men ===
Rank	Name	Nation	FS	Points	Team name
1	Feodosi Efremenkov	Russia	117.13	8	Team 1 TM1
2	Shoma Uno	Japan	112.72	7	Team 4 TM4
3	Lee June-hyoung	South Korea	109.30	6	Team 7 TM7
4	Timofei Novaikin	France	99.56	5	Team 8 TM8
5	Yaroslav Paniot	Ukraine	85.06	4	Team 2 TM2
6	Tino Olenius	Finland	82.50	3	Team 5 TM5
7	Carlo Vittorio Palermo	Italy	75.71	2	Team 3 TM3
8	Alexander Lyan	Kazakhstan	60.45	1	Team 6 TM6

=== Ladies ===
Rank	Name	Nation	FS	Points	Team name
1	Park So-youn	South Korea	96.84	8	Team 6 TM6
2	Jordan Bauth	United States	77.84	7	Team 4 TM4
3	Eveliina Viljanen	Finland	76.27	6	Team 2 TM2
4	Anais Ventard	France	76.09	5	Team 3 TM3
5	Tina Stuerzinger	Switzerland	73.46	4	Team 1 TM1
6	Micol Cristini	Italy	65.60	3	Team 7 TM7
7	Myrtel Saldeen Olofsson	Sweden	64.16	2	Team 5 TM5
8	Sindra Kriisa	Estonia	58.52	1	Team 8 TM8

=== Ice dancing ===
Rank	Name	Nation	FD	Points	Team name
1	Anna Yanovskaya / Sergey Mozgov	Russia	84.55	8	Team 5 TM5
2	Oleksandra Nazarova / Maxim Nikitin	Ukraine	78.44	7	Team 8 TM8
3	Maria Simonova / Dmitri Dragun	Russia	76.02	6	Team 2 TM2
4	Estelle Elizabeth / Romain Le Gac	France	66.88	5	Team 6 TM6
5	Jana Čejková / Alexandr Sinicyn	Czech Republic	54.72	4	Team 3 TM3
6	Victoria-Laura Lõhmus / Andrei Davõdov	Estonia	45.60	3	Team 7 TM7
7	Eugenia Tkachenka / Yuri Hulitski	Belarus	44.36	2	Team 4 TM4
8	Millie Paterson / Edward Carstairs	United Kingdom	44.02	1	Team 1 TM1
