= Figure skating at the 2012 Winter Youth Olympics – Ice dancing =

Ice dancing at the I Winter Youth Olympic Games
- Venue: Olympiahalle
- Dates: January 15; January 17
- Competitors: 24 from 11 nations

The ice dancing competition of the 2012 Winter Youth Olympics was held at the Olympiahalle in Innsbruck on January 15 (short dance) and January 17 (free dance), 2012.

== Results ==
=== Short dance results ===
Pl.	Name	Nation	TSS	TES	PCS	SS	TR	PE	CH	IN	Ded	StN
1	Anna Yanovskaya / Sergey Mozgov	Russia	60.19	33.79	26.40	6.75	6.46	6.64	6.75	6.43	0.00	1
2	Oleksandra Nazarova / Maxim Nikitin	Ukraine	57.44	33.36	24.08	6.04	5.82	6.18	6.11	5.96	0.00	11
3	Maria Simonova / Dmitri Dragun	Russia	54.11	29.57	24.54	6.18	5.82	6.25	6.21	6.18	0.00	7
4	Rachel Parsons / Michael Parsons	United States	44.69	25.49	20.20	5.25	4.89	5.07	5.04	5.00	1.00	4
5	Karina Uzurova / Ilias Ali	Kazakhstan	43.71	26.29	18.42	4.82	4.43	4.86	4.71	4.29	1.00	5
6	Estelle Elizabeth / Romain Le Gac	France	42.60	24.42	20.18	5.14	4.82	5.00	5.11	5.11	2.00	8
7	Jasmine Tessari / Stefano Colafato	Italy	38.00	23.36	14.64	3.86	3.46	3.61	3.82	3.54	0.00	3
8	Jana Čejková / Alexandr Sinicyn	Czech Republic	37.38	20.00	17.38	4.50	4.14	4.39	4.54	4.18	0.00	9
9	Christine Smith / Simon Eisenbauer	Austria	32.22	19.93	12.29	3.11	2.86	3.32	3.32	2.82	0.00	12
10	Eugenia Tkachenka / Yuri Hulitski	Belarus	31.90	20.22	11.68	3.07	2.75	3.07	3.21	2.57	0.00	2
11	Millie Paterson / Edward Carstairs	Great Britain	30.70	16.43	14.27	3.64	3.36	3.68	3.71	3.46	0.00	10
12	Victoria-Laura Lõhmus / Andrei Davõdov	Estonia	26.67	13.36	13.31	3.46	3.14	3.39	3.54	3.14	0.00	6

=== Free dance results ===
Pl.	Name	Nation	TSS	TES	PCS	SS	TR	PE	CH	IN	Ded	StN
1	Anna Yanovskaya / Sergey Mozgov	Russia	86.77	42.78	43.99	7.39	7.04	7.54	7.43	7.46	0.00	9
2	Oleksandra Nazarova / Maxim Nikitin	Ukraine	74.24	35.70	38.54	6.54	6.14	6.61	6.50	6.50	0.00	11
3	Maria Simonova / Dmitri Dragun	Russia	71.11	33.50	37.61	6.39	6.11	6.32	6.36	6.25	0.00	12
4	Rachel Parsons / Michael Parsons	United States	69.53	35.21	35.32	6.00	5.61	5.93	6.07	6.00	1.00	10
5	Estelle Elizabeth / Romain Le Gac	France	63.82	32.63	31.19	5.25	4.89	5.39	5.39	5.29	0.00	5
6	Karina Uzurova / Ilias Ali	Kazakhstan	59.06	31.00	29.06	4.96	4.57	5.00	4.93	4.93	1.00	7
7	Jana Čejková / Alexandr Sinicyn	Czech Republic	55.34	27.00	28.34	4.82	4.50	4.89	4.79	4.75	0.00	6
8	Jasmine Tessari / Stefano Colafato	Italy	50.15	26.21	24.94	4.21	3.96	4.18	4.32	4.25	1.00	8
9	Christine Smith / Simon Eisenbauer	Austria	46.04	26.00	20.04	3.43	3.18	3.46	3.43	3.29	0.00	3
10	Victoria-Laura Lõhmus / Andrei Davõdov	Estonia	44.11	25.42	20.69	3.54	3.29	3.50	3.54	3.46	2.00	4
11	Eugenia Tkachenka / Yuri Hulitski	Belarus	42.66	22.71	19.95	3.43	3.11	3.43	3.50	3.29	0.00	2
12	Millie Paterson / Edward Carstairs	Great Britain	40.35	18.55	21.80	3.64	3.43	3.75	3.82	3.68	0.00	1

=== Overall results ===
Pl.	Name	Nation	Total points	SD	FD
1	Anna Yanovskaya / Sergey Mozgov	Russia	146.96	60.19	86.77
2	Oleksandra Nazarova / Maxim Nikitin	Ukraine	131.68	57.44	74.24
3	Maria Simonova / Dmitri Dragun	Russia	125.22	54.11	71.11
4	Rachel Parsons / Michael Parsons	United States	114.22	44.69	69.53
5	Estelle Elizabeth / Romain Le Gac	France	106.42	42.60	63.82
6	Karina Uzurova / Ilias Ali	Kazakhstan	102.77	43.71	59.06
7	Jana Čejková / Alexandr Sinicyn	Czech Republic	92.72	37.38	55.34
8	Jasmine Tessari / Stefano Colafato	Italy	88.15	38.00	50.15
9	Christine Smith / Simon Eisenbauer	Austria	78.26	32.22	46.04
10	Eugenia Tkachenka / Yuri Hulitski	Belarus	74.56	31.90	42.66
11	Millie Paterson / Edward Carstairs	Great Britain	71.05	30.70	40.35
12	Victoria-Laura Lõhmus / Andrei Davõdov	Estonia	70.78	26.67	44.11
