= Park So-yeon =

Park So-yeon, Park So-youn or Pak So-yŏn may refer to:

- Park So-yeon (singer) (born 1987), South Korean idol, singer, actress, member of T-ara
- Park So-youn (figure skater) (born 1997), South Korean figure skater

== See also ==
- Park Si-yeon (born Park Mi-seon, 1979), South Korean actress
