= Figure skating at the 2012 Winter Youth Olympics =

Figure Skating at the I Winter Youth Olympic Games
- Venue: OlympiaWorld Innsbruck
- Dates: 14–22 January
- Competitors: 66 from 21 nations

Figure skating at the 2012 Winter Youth Olympics took place at the OlympiaWorld venue in Innsbruck, Austria.

Unique to the Youth Olympic Games was a mixed NOC team trophy competition.

== Medal summary ==
=== Medal table ===
Rank	Nation	Gold	Silver	Bronze	Total
1	Russia	2	2	3	7
2	China	2	0	1	3
–	Mixed-NOCs	1	1	1	3
3	Japan	0	1	0	1
3	Ukraine	0	1	0	1
Totals (4 entries)		5	5	5	15

=== Events ===
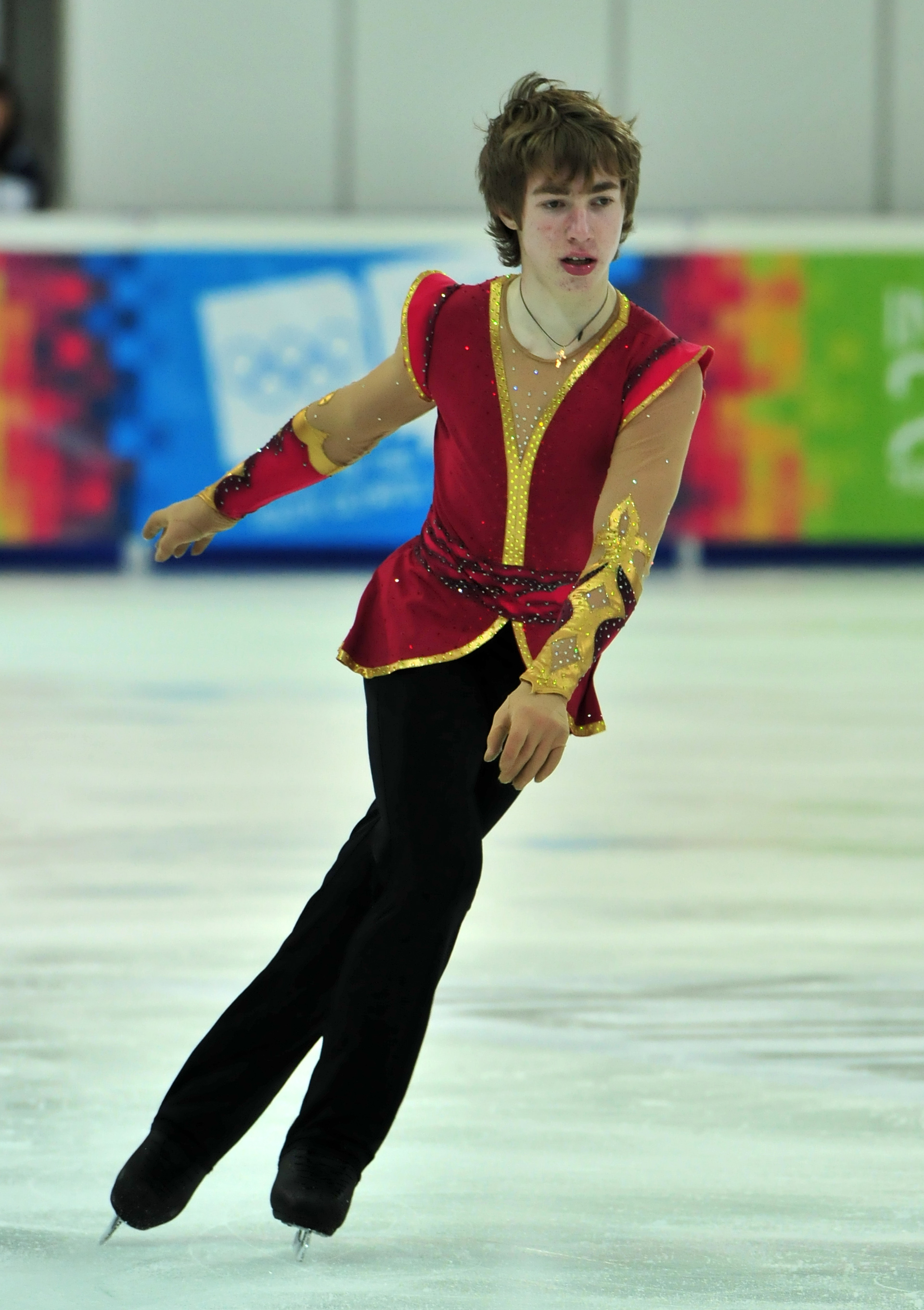
Feodosiy Efremenkov

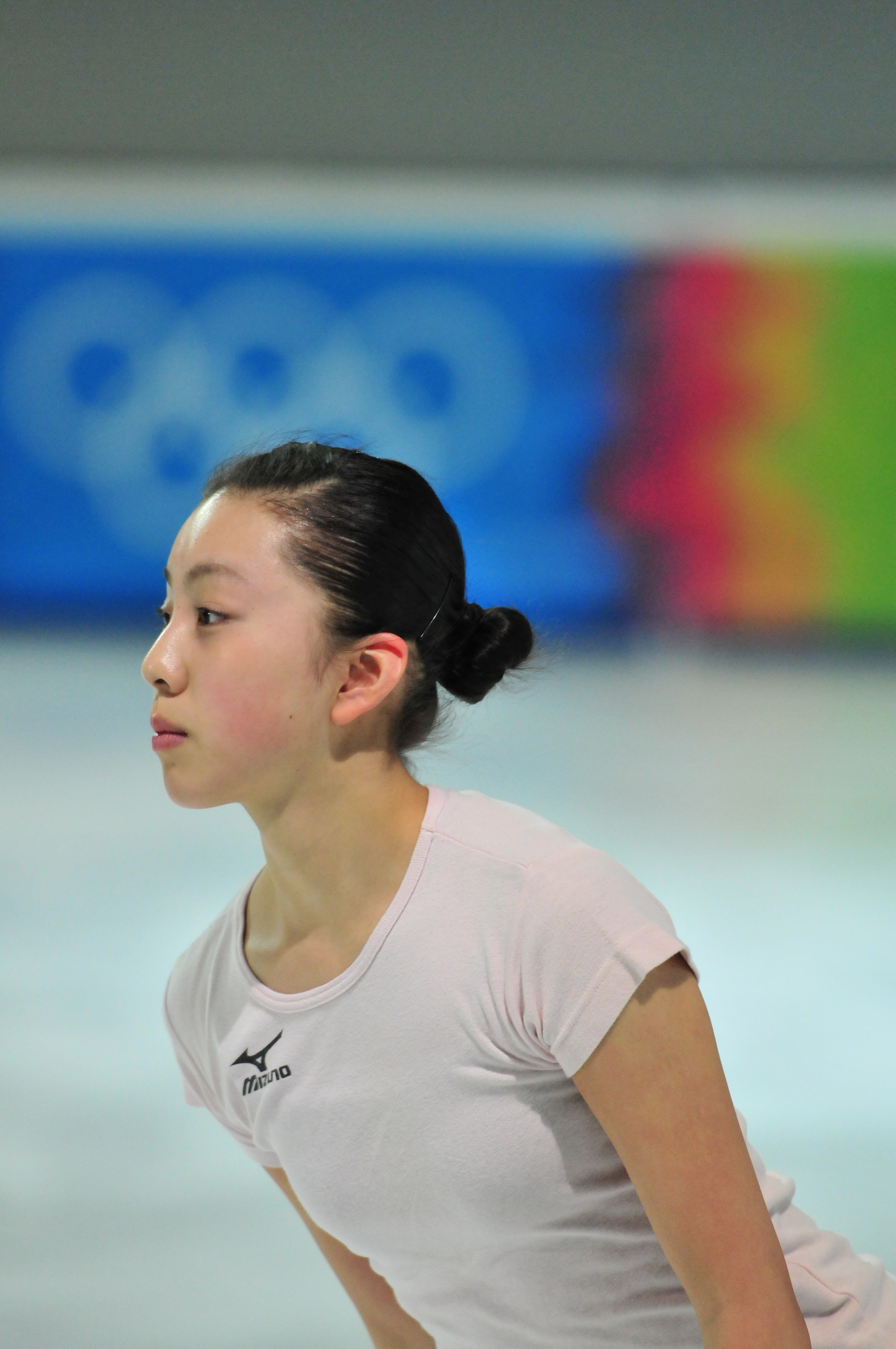
Risa Shoji

Discipline	Gold	Silver	Bronze
Boys' singles	Yan Han; China	Shoma Uno; Japan	Feodosiy Efremenkov; Russia
Girls' singles	Elizaveta Tuktamysheva; Russia	Adelina Sotnikova; Russia	Li Zijun; China
Pair skating	Yu Xiaoyu / Jin Yang; China	Lina Fedorova / Maxim Miroshkin; Russia	Anastasia Dolidze / Vadim Ivanov; Russia
Ice dancing	Anna Yanovskaya / Sergey Mozgov; Russia	Oleksandra Nazarova / Maxim Nikitin; Ukraine	Maria Simonova / Dmitri Dragun; Russia
Mixed NOC team	Shoma Uno (JPN); Jordan Bauth (USA); Eugenia Tkachenka / Yuri Hulitski (BLR)	Yaroslav Paniot (UKR); Eveliina Viljanen (FIN); Maria Simonova / Dmitri Dragun (RUS)	Alexander Lyan (KAZ); Park So-youn (KOR); Estelle Elizabeth / Romain Le Gac (FRA)

== Eligibility ==
To be eligible for the 2012 Youth Olympic Games, athletes must have been born between 1 January 1996 and 31 December 1997.

Exception: Male skaters in pairs and ice dance may have been born between 1 January 1994 and 31 December 1997.

== Qualification system ==
The overall quota for the figure skating competition was 76 total skaters, consisting of 38 men and 38 ladies. There were 16 skaters in each of the single skating disciplines (men's and ladies'), 10 pair skating teams, and 12 ice dancing team. The maximum number of entries that qualified by a National Olympic Committee was 2 per event, making 12 (6 men, 6 ladies) the maximum number of entries that a country could qualify.

If a country placed a skater in the first, second or third position in a 2011 World Junior Figure Skating Championships discipline they qualified for two spots in that discipline at the Youth Olympics. All other nations could enter one athlete until a quota spot of 12 for each single event, 7 for pairs and 9 for ice dancing, was reached. There were further four spots for each single event and three spots for pairs/ice dancing at the 2011–12 ISU Junior Grand Prix.
