= Estelle Elizabeth =

French ice dancer

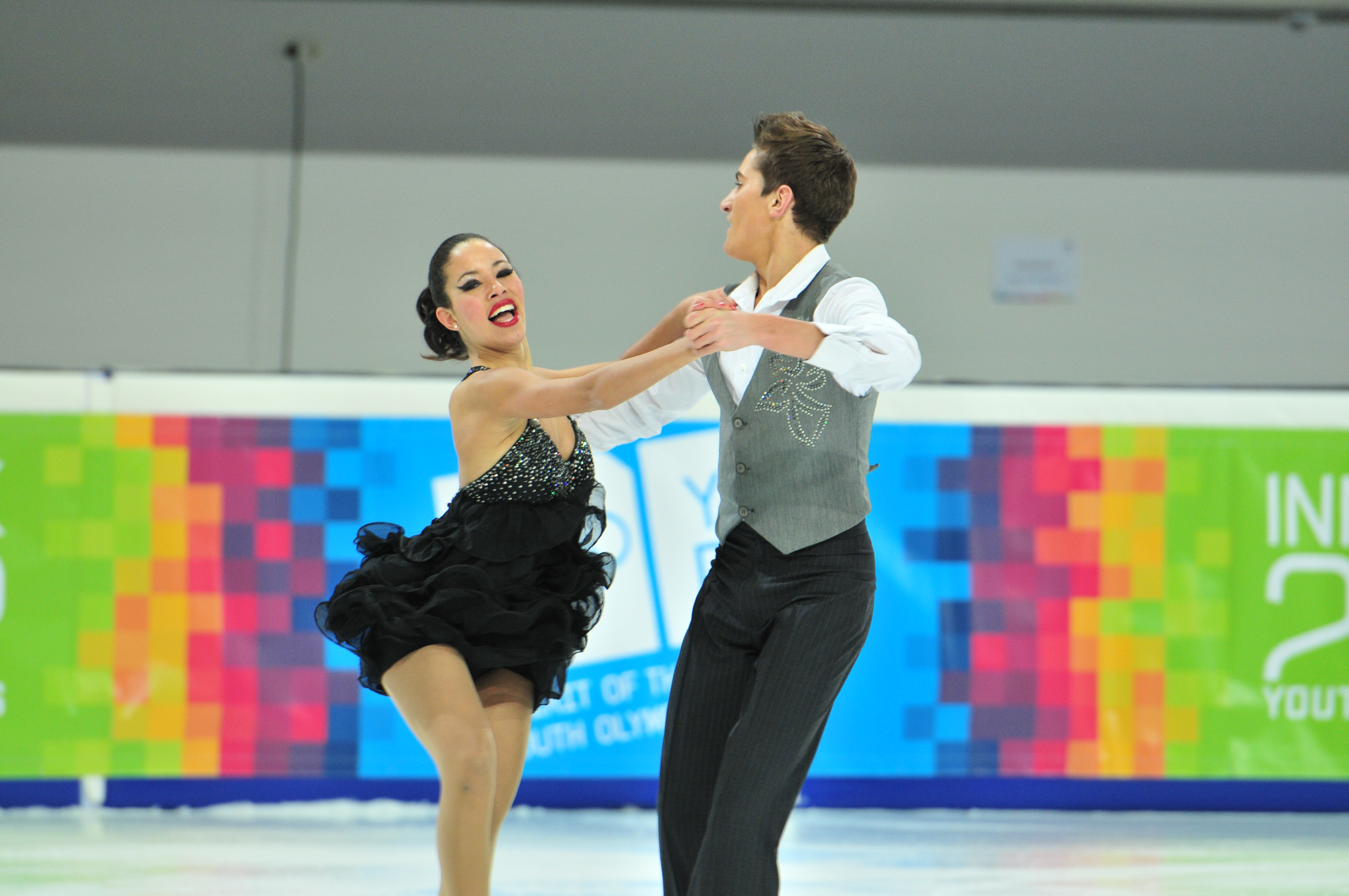
- Elizabeth and Le Gac at the 2012 Winter Youth Olympics

Personal information
- Born: 29 June 1996 (age 30) Châlons-en-Champagne, France
- Home town: Lyon, France
- Height: 1.56 m (5 ft 1 1/2 in)

Figure skating career
- Country: France
- Discipline: Pair skating
- Partner: Romain Le Gac
- Began skating: 2000

Medal record
Winter Youth Olympics
Bronze medal – third place	2012 Innsbruck	Pairs

Estelle Elizabeth (born 29 June 1996) is a French ice dancer. She and former partner Romain Le Gac represented France at the 2012 Winter Youth Olympics and at two World Junior Championships, achieving their best result, 11th, in 2014.

== Career ==
Elizabeth debuted on the junior international level with Romain Le Gac in the 2010–11 season. In January 2012, they represented France at the Winter Youth Olympics in Innsbruck, Austria, placing 6th in the short dance, 5th in the free dance, and 5th overall. They won bronze in the team event.

Elizabeth/Le Gac finished 15th at the 2013 World Junior Championships in Milan after ranking 13th in the short and 18th in the free dance. They placed 11th in both segments and 11th overall at the 2014 World Junior Championships in Sofia, Bulgaria. They were coached by Muriel Boucher-Zazoui, Romain Haguenauer, and Olivier Schoenfelder in Lyon. Their partnership ended by July 2014.

== Programs ==
(with Le Gac)

Season	Short dance	Free dance
2013–2014	Maddest Kind of Love; King of Swing by Big Bad Voodoo Daddy	Bamboleo; Habla Me; Volare all by Gipsy Kings
2012–2013	Madness; Uprising by Muse; Les Uns Contre Les Autres by Fabienne Thibeault; Pumpkin and Honey Bunny by Dick Dale & The Del-Tones	Je m'voyais deja; La Bohème by Charles Aznavour
2011–2012	Sway performed by The Puppini Sisters; Sway performed by The Pussycat Dolls	Stephane; Do You Know what It Means to Miss New Orleans; Minor Swing by Claude Bolling, Stephane Grappelli

== Competitive highlights ==
=== Pair skating with Romain Le Gac ===
Competition placements at junior level
Season	2010–11	2011–12	2012–13	2013–14
Winter Youth Olympics		5th		
Winter Youth Olympics (Team event)		3rd		
World Junior Championships			15th	11th
French Championships		1st	2nd	1st
JGP Austria		9th		
JGP Belarus				7th
JGP France			10th	
JGP Italy		8th		
JGP Latvia				5th
JGP Turkey			10th	
Ice Challenge				2nd
Master's de Patinage	2nd	3rd	2nd	1st
Pavel Roman Memorial		12th		
Santa Claus Cup		5th		
Trophy of Lyon	9th	3rd	2nd	
