= Eugenia Tkachenka =

Belarusian ice dancer

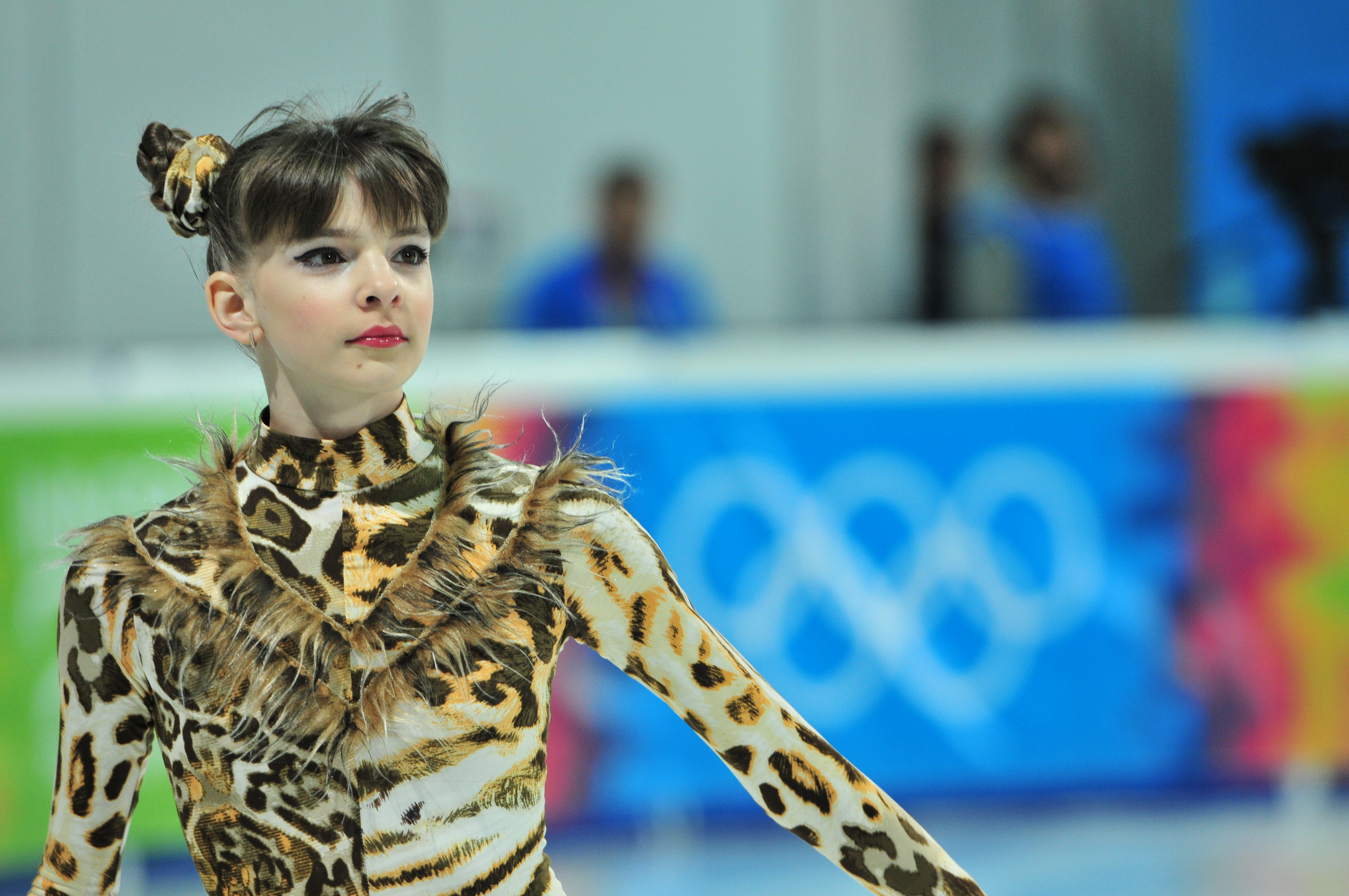
- Tkachenka at the 2012 Winter Youth Olympics

Personal information
- Born: 24 December 1997 (age 28) Minsk, Belarus
- Height: 1.70 m (5 ft 7 in)

Figure skating career
- Country: Belarus
- Coach: Tatiana Beliaeva
- Skating club: RCOP
- Began skating: 2001
Medal record
Representing Mixed-NOCs
Winter Youth Olympics
Gold medal – first place	2012 Innsbruck	Team

Eugenia Siarheyeuna Tkachenka (born 24 December 1997) is a Belarusian competitive ice dancer. With former partner Yuri Hulitski, she placed 10th at the 2012 Winter Youth Olympics and 17th at the 2015 World Junior Championships in Tallinn, Estonia.

== Programs ==
(with Hulitski)

Season	Short dance	Free dance
2014–15	Samba: Rolling in the Deep; Rhumba: Set Fire to the Rain; Samba: Rolling in the Deep by Adele	The Great Gatsby
2013–14	Quickstep: La Vie en rose	
2011–12	Cha Cha: A Night Like This by Caro Emerald; Samba: Selection by Black Eyed Peas	Cats by Andrew Lloyd Webber

== Competitive highlights ==
JGP: Junior Grand Prix

With Hulitski

International
Event	10–11	11–12	12–13	13–14	14–15
Junior Worlds					17th
Youth Olympics		10th			
JGP Belarus				12th	
JGP France					9th
JGP Germany			12th		11th
JGP Latvia		18th			
JGP Poland				13th	
JGP Slovenia			16th		
Ice Star			4th J	7th J	2nd J
Tallinn Trophy					1st J
Toruń Cup				7th J	
Volvo Open Cup			4th J		5th J
National
Belarusian				2nd J	2nd J
Team events
Youth Olympics		1st T 7th P			
J: Junior level T: Team result; P: Personal result. Medals awarded for team result only.
