= Maksym Nikitin =

Ukrainian ice dancer

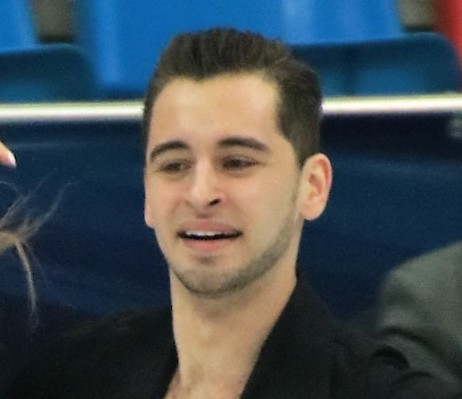
- Nikitin at the 2018 European Championships

Personal information
- Native name: Максим Костянтинович Нікітін
- Full name: Maksym Kostiantynovych Nikitin
- Born: 5 October 1994 (age 32) Kharkiv, Ukraine
- Height: 1.78 m (5 ft 10 in)

Figure skating career
- Country: Ukraine
- Discipline: Ice dance
- Partner: Oleksandra Nazarova
- Began skating: 1998
- Retired: 13 August 2022
Medal record
Representing Ukraine
Figure skating: Ice dance
World Junior Championships
Bronze medal – third place	2015 Tallinn	Ice dance
Winter Youth Olympics
Silver medal – second place	2012 Innsbruck	Ice dance

Maksym Kostiantynovych Nikitin (Ukrainian: Максим Костянтинович Нікітін; born 5 October 1994) is a Ukrainian retired ice dancer. With his skating partner, Oleksandra Nazarova, he is the 2015 World Junior bronze medalist and 2012 Youth Olympic silver medalist. On the senior level, they are the 2017 Winter Universiade champions, 2014 CS Warsaw Cup silver medalists, 2016 Cup of Nice bronze medalists, and six-time Ukrainian national champions (2015, 2017, 2018, 2020–2022). Nazorova/Nikitin have represented Ukraine at the 2018 and 2022 Winter Olympics.

== Personal life ==
Maxim Nikitin was born on 5 October 1994 in Kharkiv, Ukraine. Around 2012, he enrolled at the Kharkiv State Academy of Physical Culture, where he is a correspondence student.

== Career ==
=== Early career ===
Nikitin was a recreational single skater in his early years. Around 2004, Halyna Churilova encouraged him and Oleksandra Nazarova, also a single skater from Kharkiv, to form an ice dancing partnership.

Nazarova/Nikitin debuted on the ISU Junior Grand Prix series in 2010. They placed eleventh in Graz, Austria and seventh in Sheffield, England. Churilova coached the team in their hometown.

In the 2011–2012 season, they made no appearances on the JGP series but were sent to the Youth Olympics in January 2012 in Innsbruck, Austria. They won the silver medal behind Russia's Yanovskaya/Mozgov.

=== 2012–2013 season ===
Nazarova/Nikitin placed fifth at both of their 2012 JGP events and were assigned to their first World Junior Championships. At the latter competition, held in late February and early March 2013 in Milan, Italy, the duo placed twelfth in the short dance, ninth in the free dance, and eleventh overall. After the event, Churilova advised them to join Russian coach Alexander Zhulin. They relocated to Moscow to train with Zhulin and Oleg Volkov.

=== 2013–2014 season ===
Nazarova/Nikitin won silver at both of their 2013 JGP assignments and qualified for the JGP Final. They placed fifth at the Final, held in December 2013 in Fukuoka, Japan. In March 2014, they finished fifth at the World Junior Championships in Sofia, Bulgaria, having ranked seventh in the short dance and fourth in the free dance.

=== 2014–2015 season: Senior debut ===
Nazarova/Nikitin continued training in Moscow in the 2014–2015 season. At the Junior Grand Prix event in Courchevel, France, they ranked fifth in the short dance and third in the free dance. The duo finished fourth overall, 0.54 shy of third place. They won the bronze medal at their next JGP event, in Tallinn, Estonia, after placing sixth in the short and third in the free dance.

Making their senior international debut, Nazarova/Nikitin won the silver medal at the Warsaw Cup, a Challenger Series event in November 2014. After winning the Ukrainian senior national title, they were named in Ukraine's team to the European Championships, held in late January 2015 in Stockholm, Sweden. Ranked twelfth in the short dance and eleventh in the free dance, the two finished eleventh overall.

In early March, the two competed at the 2015 World Junior Championships in Tallinn, Estonia. They were awarded the bronze medal after placing fifth in the short dance, second in the free dance, and third overall behind Yanovskaya/Mozgov of Russia and McNamara/Carpenter of the United States. It was Ukraine's first podium finish at the event since 2000. At the end of the same month, Nazarova/Nikitin competed on the senior level at the 2015 World Championships in Shanghai, China; they ranked seventeenth in both segments and overall.

=== 2015–2016 season ===
Making their Grand Prix debut, Nazarova/Nikitin finished seventh at the 2015 Skate America. They withdrew from the Ukrainian Championships due to Nazarova's knee injury. The duo returned to competition in late March 2016 at the World Championships in Boston. Ranked 20th in the short dance, they narrowly qualified for the free dance, where they placed 18th, resulting in a final placement of nineteenth.

Deciding to change coaches, Nazarova/Nikitin joined Igor Shpilband and Fabian Bourzat in Novi, Michigan in late June 2016.

=== 2016–2017 season ===
Nazarova/Nikitin opened their season with a bronze medal at the International Cup of Nice. They finished seventh at their Grand Prix assignment, the 2016 Trophée de France, and ninth at the 2017 European Championships in Ostrava, Czech Republic.

In February, they received the gold medal at the 2017 Winter Universiade in Almaty, Kazakhstan. In March, they placed fifteenth at the 2017 World Championships in Helsinki, Finland. Due to their result, Ukraine qualified a spot in the ice dancing event at the 2018 Winter Olympics in Pyeongchang, South Korea.

=== 2017–2018 season: Pyeongchang Olympics ===
Nazarova/Nikitin won the bronze medal at the 2017 CS Lombardia Trophy and the 2017 CS Warsaw Cup and placed fourth at the 2017 CS Ice Star. They placed sixth at their lone Grand Prix assignment for the year, 2017 NHK Trophy. They placed eleventh at the European Championships before competing at their first Winter Olympics in Pyeongchang, South Korea, where they placed a surprising twenty-first. They concluded with the 2018 World Championships, placing fifteenth.

After this season ended, they left Igor Shpilband in Novi, Michigan, and began training only under Fabian Bourzat in France.

=== 2018–2019 season ===
The new season began at the 2018 CS Nebelhorn Trophy, where they struggled, placing ninth. Assigned to two Grand Prix events, they placed eighth at Skate America and ninth at NHK Trophy. They did not finish at the Ukrainian Championships. Due to injury, They withdrew from European Championships, with Popova/Byelikov winning the former and attending the latter as the Ukrainian competitor. At the 2019 World Championships, Nazarova/Nikitin placed twentieth.

=== 2019–2020 season ===
Nazarova/Nikitin began the season at the 2019 CS Lombardia Trophy, where they placed fourth in both programs to win the bronze medal overall. They went on to win the bronze medal at the 2019 CS Ice Star, where they set a personal best in the Rhythm Dance and overall score.

Between 2019 CS Ice Star and the 2019 Bosphorus Cup, Nazarova/Nikitin announced that they had ended their partnership with Fabian Bourzat. They returned to Kharkiv to train under Halyna Churilova and occasionally under Alexander Zhulin.

They went on to win two other international events and a silver medal at the 2019 Bosphorus Cup. Later that year, they won the Ukraine Championships. National champions again, Nazarova/Nikitin finished the season at the 2020 European Championships, where they placed tenth. They had been assigned to compete at the World Championships in Montreal, but these were cancelled as a result of the coronavirus pandemic.

=== 2020–2021 season ===
Nazarova/Nikitin debuted at the 2020 CS Budapest Trophy, winning the gold medal. They competed on the Grand Prix at the 2020 Rostelecom Cup, placing sixth. They placed twentieth at the 2021 World Championships in Stockholm. Their World result qualified for a berth for a Ukrainian dance team at the 2022 Winter Olympics.

=== 2021–2022 season: Beijing Olympics ===
Beginning the season on the Challenger series, Nazarova/Nikitin won the silver medal at the 2021 CS Denis Ten Memorial Challenge. On the Grand Prix, they were eighth at the 2021 NHK Trophy. After winning the Viktor Petrenko Cup, Nazarova/Nikitin won their sixth Ukrainian national title, and were named to their second Ukrainian Olympic team. Competing first at the 2022 European Championships, they finished tenth.

Nazorova/Nikitin began the 2022 Winter Olympics as the Ukrainian entries to the rhythm dance segment of the Olympic team event. They finished ninth of ten teams. In the dance event, they finished twentieth in the rhythm dance and were the last team to qualify for the free dance. Eighteenth in the free dance, they remained twentieth overall.

Following the Olympics, Nazarova and Nikitin returned to their homes in Kharkiv, which shortly afterward became a central point of conflict when Vladimir Putin launched an invasion of Ukraine. The invasion severed their relations with Russian coach Alexander Zhulin, with whom they had trained with from 2013 to 2016 and again from 2019 onward. They both expressed anger at Zhulin and former training partners Victoria Sinitsina and Nikita Katsalapov, who had appeared at a rally in support of the Russian invasion, saying, "we were such big friends with Vika and Nikita. It was so difficult to see how they are supporting their President who is killing our Ukrainian people." After weeks in the city while under bombardment, they evacuated to the Polish city of Toruń to resume training. They received considerable support from skaters in other European and North American countries, notably entreaties from French Olympic champion Gabriella Papadakis that they attend the 2022 World Championships in Montpellier despite their training disruptions.

Nazarova and Nikitin sought assistance from Canadian music editor Hugo Chouinard in revamping their rhythm dance, as they did not want to skate to happy music under the circumstances. The new program made use of Ukrainian singer Jamala's song "1944" about the persecution of Crimean Tatars by the order of Joseph Stalin, and a remix of the folk song "Oi u luzi chervona kalyna" which had become an anthem of resistance to the invasion. Nazarova and Nikitin took to the ice wearing the Ukrainian national colours and received a huge ovation from the crowd for the rhythm dance segment, where they placed sixteenth. They opted to withdraw from the free dance, saying that they had not had time to change that program and "we consider it inappropriate to dance it while people are dying and hiding in basements in our country."

== Programs ==
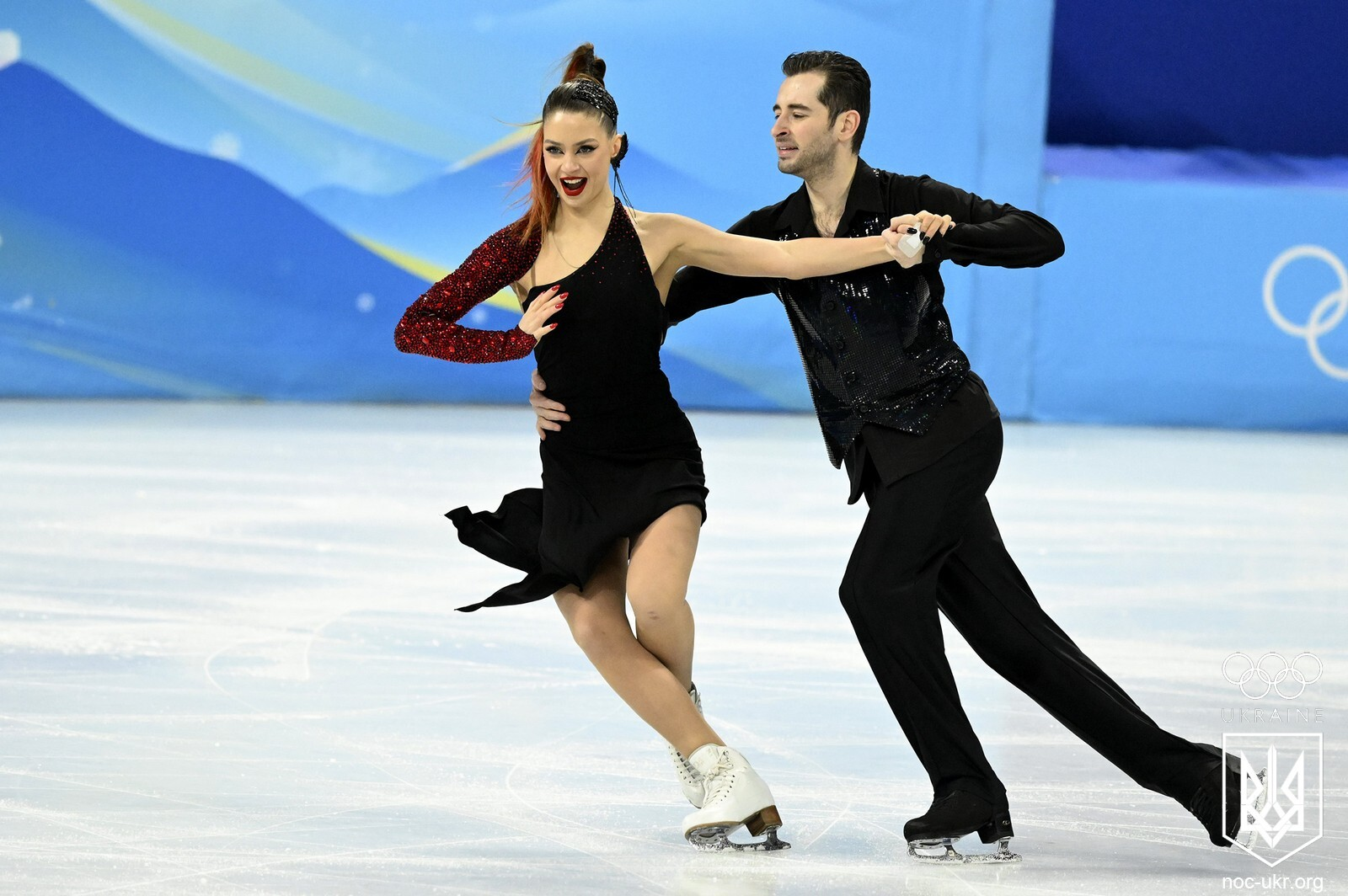
Nazarova and Nikitin at the 2022 Winter Olympics

(with Nazarova)

Season	Short dance	Free dance	Exhibition
2021–2022	Blues: 1944 by Jamala; Swing: Oi u luzi chervona kalyna by The Kiffness, Andriy Khlyvniuk; Blues: Hit the Road Jack by Percy Mayfield performed by Mariana, Dondi, Iggy choreo. by Sergei Petukhov	Rivederti by Mario Biondi; Backstage Romance (from Moulin Rouge!) performed by Ricky Rojas, Robyn Hurder choreo. by Sergei Petukhov	Les Yeux Noirs (Dark Eyes) by PomplamooseMusic
2019–2021	Quickstep: Overture; Blues: Overture (from 42nd Street) by Harry Warren, Al Dubin choreo. by Sergei Petukhov	Prima Donna; Après la Pluie; Steppe by René Aubry choreo. by Sergei Petukhov	Moonlight Night by Oleg Vynnyk
2018–2019	Tango: Cell Block Tango; Foxtrot: Overture; Foxtrot: All That Jazz (from Chicago) by John Kander & Fred Ebb	The Nightclub-Dance Suite; At the Millionaire's Home (from City Lights) by Charlie Chaplin; The Adventurer by Charlie Chaplin & Carl Davis; Titine (from Modern Times) by Charlie Chaplin	
2017–2018	Rhumba: Chivirico (from Wanted) by Pérez Prado; Mambo: Cu-cu-rru-cu-cu-paloma (from Mambo No. 5) by Pérez Prado, Rosemary Clooney; Mambo: La Pantera Mambo (The Pink Panther Theme) by Henry Mancini	Hoist the Colours (from Pirates of the Caribbean: At World's End); Jack Sparrow; Wheel of Fortune (from Pirates of the Caribbean: Dead Man's Chest) by Hans Zimmer; Tune of Pirates by Antony Larsson, Tony Brown	
2016–2017	Blues: Only You (And You Alone) by Buck Ram performed by The Platters; Swing: Tutti Frutti by Little Richard	Droit de cité by Raphaël Beau (from Micmacs); Sur le mesure by Hugues Le Bars; Diabolique by Raphaël Beau (from Micmacs)	
2015–2016	Waltz: The Blue Danube by Johann Strauss II; March: Radetzky March by Johann Strauss I	Fantasia No. 3 in D minor by Wolfgang Amadeus Mozart	
2014–2015	Senior level: Flamenco: Street Dance by Didulia; Paso Doble; Junior level: Samba Vocalizado by Luciano Perrone; Rhumba: Perfidia by John Altman; Samba Vocalizado by Luciano Perrone	Escalier by Hugues Le Bars; Air by Johann Sebastian Bach; Tango Tchack by Hugues Le Bars	Jalousie 'Tango Tzigane' by Jacob Gade
2013–2014	Man With the Hex performed by The Atomic Fireballs; Mack the Knife by Kurt Weill	Cabaret by Fred Ebb, John Kander	Love the Way You Lie by Eminem ft. Rihanna
2012–2013	Gotta Broken Heart by Walter Trout; Swing Set	Gopher Mambo; Habanera; Malambo	
2011–2012	Cha Cha: Chilly Cha Cha by Jessica Jay; Samba: Mujer Latina by Thalía	Lacrymosa by Evanescence	
2010–2011	Padam, padam... by Édith Piaf; Tango of Love performed by Edvin Marton	Swing performed by Diablo Swing Orchestra; O'Clock Blues by Eric Clapton; Swing Set by Jurassic 5	
2009–2010	Ukrainian folk dance	Hi-De-Ho by K7; This Business of Love; Hey Pachuco	
2007–2008		Caravan	

== Competitive highlights ==
GP: Grand Prix; CS: Challenger Series; JGP: Junior Grand Prix

With Nazarova

International
Event	10–11	11–12	12–13	13–14	14–15	15–16	16–17	17–18	18–19	19–20	20–21	21–22
Olympics								21st				20th
Worlds					17th	19th	15th	15th	20th	C	20th	WD
Europeans					11th		9th	11th		10th		10th
GP France							7th					
GP NHK Trophy								6th	9th			8th
GP Rostelecom											6th	
GP Skate America						7th			8th			
CS Budapest											1st	
CS Denis Ten MC												2nd
CS Golden Spin					4th		6th					
CS Ice Star								4th		3rd		
CS Lombardia								3rd		3rd		
CS Nebelhorn									9th			
CS Tallinn Trophy						6th						
CS U.S. Classic						4th						
CS Warsaw Cup					2nd			3rd				
Bosphorus Cup										2nd		
Cup of Nice							3rd	5th				
Ice Star							1st					
LuMi Dance Trophy											1st	
Mezzaluna Cup										1st		
Open Ice Mall									1st			
Pavel Roman								1st		1st		
Santa Claus Cup								1st				
Universiade							1st					
Victor Petrenko Cup												1st
International: Junior
Junior Worlds			11th	5th	3rd							
Youth Olympics		2nd										
JGP Final				5th								
JGP Austria	11th		5th									
JGP Croatia			5th									
JGP Czech Rep.					4th							
JGP Estonia				2nd	3rd							
JGP Poland				2nd								
JGP U.K.	7th											
Volvo Open				2nd								
Istanbul Cup		5th										
NRW Trophy	10th	5th	7th									
Santa Cup		8th	1st									
National
Ukrainian Champ.			1st J		1st	WD	1st	1st		1st	1st	1st
Team events
Olympics												10th T 9th P
TBD = Assigned; WD = Withdrew; C = Event cancelled Levels: N = Novice; J = Junior
