= Figure skating at the Winter Youth Olympics =

- Governing body: ISU
- Events: 5 (men: 1; womens: 1; mixed: 3)

Games
- 2012; 2016; 2020; 2024

Figure skating is one of the sports featured at the Winter Youth Olympics. Medals are awarded in men's singles, women's singles, pair skating, and ice dance, as well as a team event. Figure skating was part of the inaugural Winter Youth Olympics, held in January 2012 in Innsbruck, Austria.

== Medal summary ==
=== Men's singles ===
Year	Location	Gold	Silver	Bronze	Ref.
2012	(Austria) Innsbruck	(China) Yan Han	(Japan) Shoma Uno	(Russia) Feodosiy Efremenkov	
2016	(Norway) Lillehammer	(Japan) Sōta Yamamoto	(Latvia) Deniss Vasiļjevs	(Russia) Dmitri Aliev	
2020	(Switzerland) Lausanne	(Japan) Yuma Kagiyama	(Russia) Andrei Mozalev	(Russia) Daniil Samsonov	
2024	(South Korea) Gangneung	(South Korea) Kim Hyun-gyeom	(Slovakia) Adam Hagara	(New Zealand) Yanhao Li	

=== Women's singles ===
Year	Location	Gold	Silver	Bronze	Ref.
2012	(Austria) Innsbruck	(Russia) Elizaveta Tuktamysheva	(Russia) Adelina Sotnikova	(China) Li Zijun	
2016	(Norway) Lillehammer	(Russia) Polina Tsurskaya	(Russia) Maria Sotskova	(Kazakhstan) Elizabet Tursynbayeva	
2020	(Switzerland) Lausanne	(South Korea) You Young	(Russia) Ksenia Sinitsyna	(Russia) Anna Frolova	
2024	(South Korea) Gangneung	(Japan) Mao Shimada	(South Korea) Shin Ji-a	(Japan) Yo Takagi	

=== Pairs ===
Year	Location	Gold	Silver	Bronze	Ref.
2012	(Austria) Innsbruck	(China); Yu Xiaoyu; Jin Yang	(Russia); Lina Fedorova; Maxim Miroshkin	(Russia); Anastasia Dolidze; Vadim Ivanov	
2016	(Norway) Lillehammer	(Russia); Ekaterina Borisova; Dmitry Sopot	(Czech Republic); Anna Dušková; Martin Bidař	(Russia); Alina Ustimkina; Nikita Volodin	
2020	(Switzerland) Lausanne	(Russia); Apollinariia Panfilova; Dmitry Rylov	(Russia); Diana Mukhametzianova; Ilya Mironov	(Georgia (country)); Alina Butaeva; Luka Berulava	
2024	(South Korea) Gangneung	(Canada); Annika Behnke; Kole Sauve	(United States); Cayla Smith; Jared McPike	(Spain); Carolina Shan Campillo; Pau Vilella	

=== Ice dance ===
Year	Location	Gold	Silver	Bronze	Ref.
2012	(Austria) Innsbruck	(Russia); Anna Yanovskaya; Sergey Mozgov	(Ukraine); Oleksandra Nazarova; Maxim Nikitin	(Russia); Maria Simonova; Dmitri Dragun	
2016	(Norway) Lillehammer	(Russia); Anastasia Shpilevaya; Grigory Smirnov	(United States); Chloe Lewis; Logan Bye	(Russia); Anastasia Skoptsova; Kirill Aleshin	
2020	(Switzerland) Lausanne	(Russia); Irina Khavronina; Dario Chirizano	(Russia); Sofya Tyutyunina; Alexander Shustitskiy	(United States); Katarina Wolfkostin; Jeffrey Chen	
2024	(South Korea) Gangneung	(France); Ambre Perrier-Gianesini; Samuel Blanc-Klaperman	(United States); Olivia Ilin; Dylan Cain	(United Kingdom); Ashlie Slatter; Atl Ongay-Perez	

=== Team event ===
Year	Location	Gold	Silver	Bronze	Ref.
2024	(South Korea) Gangneung	(South Korea); Kim Hyun-gyeom	(United States); Jacob Sanchez	(Canada); David Li	
2024	(South Korea) Gangneung	(South Korea); Shin Ji-a	(United States); Sherry Zhang	(Canada); Kaiya Ruiter	
2024	(South Korea) Gangneung	(South Korea); Kim Jin-ny; Lee Na-mu	(United States); Cayla Smith; Jared McPike	(Canada); Annika Behnke; Kole Sauve	
2024	(South Korea) Gangneung	(South Korea); Kim Jin-ny; Lee Na-mu	(United States); Olivia Ilin; Dylan Cain	(Canada); Audra Gans; Michael Boutsan	

=== Mixed NOC team medalists ===
Teams made up of athletes representing different National Olympic Committees (NOCs), called mixed-NOCs teams, participate in the Winter Youth Olympics. These teams participate in events composed entirely of mixed-NOCs teams. The first edition did not include pairs due to the low number of entries.

Year	Location	Gold	Silver	Bronze	Ref.
2012	(Austria) Innsbruck	(Japan); Shoma Uno	(Ukraine); Yaroslav Paniot	(Kazakhstan); Alexander Lyan	
2012	(Austria) Innsbruck	(United States); Jordan Bauth	(Finland); Eveliina Viljanen	(South Korea); Park So-youn	
2012	(Austria) Innsbruck	(Belarus); Eugenia Tkachenka; Yuri Hulitski	(Russia); Maria Simonova; Dmitri Dragun	(France); Estelle Elizabeth; Romain Le Gac	
2016	(Norway) Lillehammer	(Russia); Dmitri Aliev	(Ukraine); Ivan Shmuratko	(Latvia); Deniss Vasiļjevs	
2016	(Norway) Lillehammer	(China); Li Xiangning	(Latvia); Diāna Ņikitina	(Hungary); Fruzsina Medgyesi	
2016	(Norway) Lillehammer	(United States); Sarah Rose; Joseph Goodpaster	(Czech Republic); Anna Dušková; Martin Bidař	(China); Gao Yumeng; Li Bowen	
2016	(Norway) Lillehammer	(Russia); Anastasia Skoptsova; Kirill Aleshin	(France); Julia Wagret; Mathieu Couyras	(Canada); Marjorie Lajoie; Zachary Lagha	
2020	(Switzerland) Lausanne	(Estonia); Arlet Levandi	(Japan); Yuma Kagiyama	(Russia); Andrei Mozalev	
2020	(Switzerland) Lausanne	(Russia); Ksenia Sinitsyna	(United States); Kate Wang	(Hungary); Regina Schermann	
2020	(Switzerland) Lausanne	(Georgia (country)); Alina Butaeva; Luka Berulava	(United States); Cate Fleming; Jedidah Isbell	(Ukraine); Sofiia Nesterova; Artem Darenskyi	
2020	(Switzerland) Lausanne	(Japan); Utana Yoshida; Shingo Nishiyama	(Russia); Sofya Tyutyunina; Alexander Shustitskiy	(Canada); Natalie D'Alessandro; Bruce Waddell	

== Medal table ==
As of the 2024 Winter Youth Olympics.

Rank	Nation	Gold	Silver	Bronze	Total
1	Russia	7	7	8	22
2	Japan	3	1	1	5
3	South Korea	3	1	0	4
4	China	2	0	1	3
5	Canada	1	0	1	2
6	France	1	0	0	1
7	United States	0	4	1	5
8	Czech Republic	0	1	0	1
8	Latvia	0	1	0	1
8	Slovakia	0	1	0	1
8	Ukraine	0	1	0	1
12	Georgia	0	0	1	1
12	Great Britain	0	0	1	1
12	Kazakhstan	0	0	1	1
12	New Zealand	0	0	1	1
12	Spain	0	0	1	1
Totals (16 entries)		17	17	17	51

== See also ==
- Figure skating at the Olympic Games
