= Sergey Mozgov =

Russian ice dancer (born 1995)

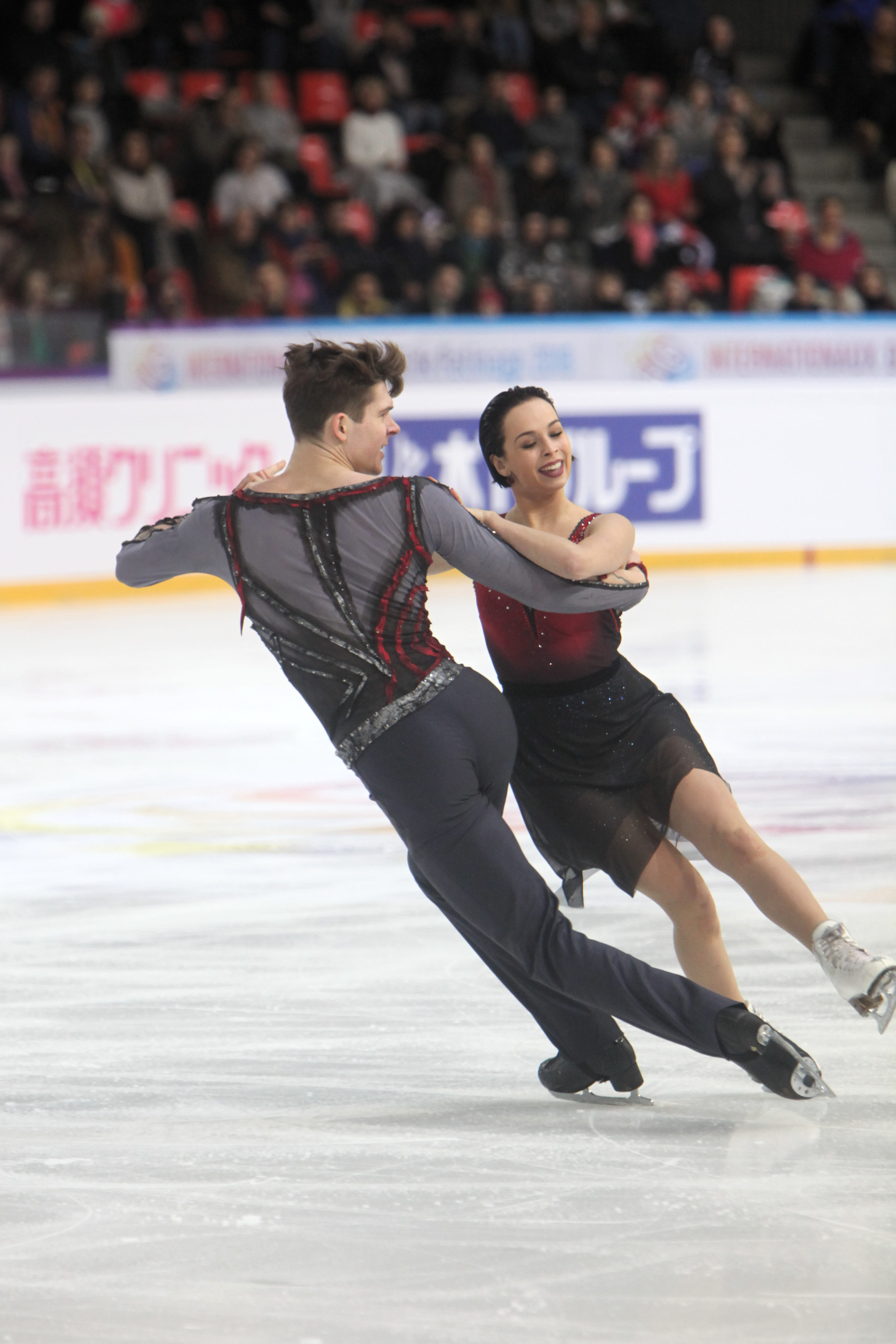
- Betina Popova and Sergey Mozgov at 2018 Internationaux de France

Personal information
- Native name: Серге́й Александрович Мозгов
- Full name: Sergey Alexandrovich Mozgov
- Other names: Sergei Mozgov
- Born: 10 March 1995 (age 31) Moscow, Russia
- Home town: Moscow, Russia
- Height: 1.88 m (6 ft 2 in)

Figure skating career
- Country: Russia
- Partner: Betina Popova
- Coach: Anjelika Krylova, Oleg Volkov
- Skating club: Sport School No. 2
- Began skating: 1999
- Retired: February 14, 2020
Medal record
Figure skating: Ice dancing
Representing Russia (with Popova)
Winter Universiade
Gold medal – first place	2019 Krasnoyarsk	Ice dancing
Representing Russia (with Yanovskaya)
Winter Youth Olympics
Gold medal – first place	2012 Innsbruck	Ice dancing
World Junior Championships
Gold medal – first place	2015 Tallinn	Ice dancing
Silver medal – second place	2014 Sofia	Ice dancing
Junior Grand Prix Final
Gold medal – first place	2013–14 Fukuoka	Ice dancing
Gold medal – first place	2014–15 Barcelona	Ice dancing
Silver medal – second place	2011–12 Quebec	Ice dancing

Sergey Alexandrovich Mozgov (Russian: Серге́й Александрович Мозгов; born 10 March 1995) is a Russian retired competitive ice dancer. With former partner Betina Popova, he is the 2017 CS Warsaw Cup champion. With former partner Anna Yanovskaya, he was the 2015 World Junior champion, two-time (2013, 2014) JGP Final champion, the 2012 Youth Olympics champion, the 2014 World Junior silver medalist, and the 2015 Russian junior national champion.

== Early career ==
Mozgov began skating in 1999. His parents introduced him to skating to improve his health. Early in his career, he competed with Sabina Adigamova.

Mozgov and Evgenia Kosigina made their international debut in the 2008–09 season. The following season, they received a Junior Grand Prix (JGP) assignment in Hungary, where they placed fifth. He ended their partnership after they finished 12th at the 2010 Russian Junior Championships.

In the 2010–11 season, Mozgov competed with Tatiana Baturintseva. They received no JGP assignments and parted ways after placing 9th at the 2011 Russian Junior Championships.

== Partnership with Yanovskaya ==
Mozgov teamed up with Anna Yanovskaya in 2011. They were coached mainly by Svetlana Alexeeva at the Medvedkovo rink in Moscow.

=== 2011–12 season: First season together ===
Yanovskaya/Mozgov won the bronze medal at their first Junior Grand Prix event, in Gdańsk, Poland, and then gold in Tallinn, Estonia. Their placements qualified them for the Junior Grand Prix Final, where they placed second in the short dance, third in the free, and took the silver medal ahead of Alexandra Stepanova / Ivan Bukin. After winning the gold medal at the 2012 Winter Youth Olympics, they placed fourth at the 2012 Russian Junior Championships. At the 2012 World Junior Championships, they were third in the short dance. During the free dance the referee stopped their music because Mozgov's left bootstrap had come loose. Yanovskaya/Mozgov finished fourth overall behind American ice dancers Alexandra Aldridge / Daniel Eaton who moved up the rankings and took the bronze medal.

=== 2012–13 season ===
In 2012–13, Yanovskaya/Mozgov won a pair of silver medals at JGP events in Austria and Slovenia and qualified for the JGP Final in Sochi, Russia, where they finished fourth. They won the bronze medal at the 2013 Russian Junior Championships.

=== 2013–14 season: First JGP Final title ===
In 2013–14, Yanovskaya/Mozgov began their season by taking gold at the 2013 JGP Slovakia in Košice. They won another gold at the 2013 JGP Estonia, qualifying them for their third JGP Final in Fukuoka, Japan. Setting personal bests, Yanovskaya/Mozgov placed first in both segments at the final and won the gold medal ahead of Kaitlin Hawayek / Jean-Luc Baker. After placing second to Stepanova/Bukin at the 2014 Russian Junior Championships, they took the silver medal at the 2014 World Junior Championships in Sofia, finishing second to Hawayek/Baker.

=== 2014–15 season: World Junior title ===
Yanovskaya/Mozgov decided to remain in the junior ranks in the 2014–15 season. In addition to Moscow, they also trained in Liepāja in the summer. Mozgov recovered from a knee injury early in the season. In the 2014–15 JGP series, the duo won gold medals in Estonia and Croatia, earning qualification to their fourth JGP Final. At the event, held in December in Barcelona, they outscored Alla Loboda / Pavel Drozd for the gold and stood atop the podium for the second consecutive year. In March, they competed at the 2016 World Junior Championships in Tallinn, Estonia. Ranked first in both segments, they were awarded the gold medal ahead of Lorraine McNamara / Quinn Carpenter.

=== 2015–16 season: Senior debut and split ===
Although still age-eligible for junior events in the 2015–16 season, Yanovskaya/Mozgov decided to move up to the senior ranks. Debuting on the Grand Prix, they placed sixth at the 2015 Skate America and 2015 Trophée Éric Bompard. In December, they finished sixth at the 2016 Russian Championships in Yekaterinburg. On 2 May 2016, the Russian media reported that their partnership had ended.

== Partnership with Popova ==
According to the Russian media, Mozgov has teamed up with Betina Popova.

Popova/Mozgov made their international debut at the 2016 CS Golden Spin of Zagreb where they placed fifth.

=== 2017–18 season ===
In 2017–18 season they competed at three ISU Challenger Series competitions. They won the gold medal at the 2017 CS Warsaw Cup with a personal best score of 164.07 points. They also won the bronze medal at the 2017 CS Ondrej Nepela Trophy. At the 2017 CS Finlandia Trophy they placed fifth.

In October 2017 they made their Grand Prix debut at the 2017 Rostelecom Cup where they placed sixth. In December 2017 they competed at the 2018 Russian Championships where they placed fourth after placing fifth in the short dance and third in the free dance.

In May 2018 Anjelika Krylova and Oleg Volkov became their new coaches.

=== 2018–19 season ===
Popova/Mozgov started their season in mid September at the 2018 CS Ondrej Nepela Trophy where they won the bronze medal with a personal best score of 170.47 points. In early November they placed seventh at the 2018 Grand Prix of Helsinki. Three weeks later they finished eighth at the 2018 Internationaux de France. In early December they won their second Challenger Series bronze medal of the season at the 2018 CS Golden Spin of Zagreb.

They placed fourth at the Russian Championships for the second consecutive year.

In March, Popova/Mozgov have participated in the 2019 Winter Universiade in Krasnoyarsk Russia. They finished first in the short and second in the free, earning the gold medal with a total of 183.01 points.

=== 2019–20 season ===
Popova/Mozgov took time off to heal injuries following their Universiade victory, and then resumed training for the new season. The two selected "Bohemian Rhapsody" as their free dance music, believing it would be a new sort of material for them. They placed fourth at the 2019 CS Ondrej Nepela Memorial and then won the bronze medal at the 2019 CS Finlandia Trophy. Given one Grand Prix assignment, they placed eighth at the 2019 Skate Canada International.

Popova/Mozgov announced their retirement from competition on February 14, 2020. Mozgov indicated that he might seek a coaching career.

== Programs ==
=== With Popova ===
Season	Rhythm dance	Free dance	Exhibition
2019–2020	Willkommen; Money Money; Mein Herr (from Cabaret) by John Kander & Fred Ebb	Bohemian Rhapsody by Queen	Nevesta by Mummly Troll
2018–2019	Tango: Volver by Maxime Rodriguez	The Master and Margarita by Igor Kornelyuk	Power Rangers soundtrack; Hafanana by Afric Simone
	Short dance		
2017–2018	Cha Cha; Rhumba: Formidable by Stromae; Samba: Batacuda Mixes performed by D.J. Dero	Carmen Suite by Georges Bizet	
2016–2017	Dream a Little Dream of Me; Rock n Roll	Going to the Run by Golden Earring; Black Betty	

=== With Yanovskaya ===
Season	Short dance	Free dance	Exhibition
2015–2016	March: Ribellione by Ennio Morricone; Waltz: My Sweet and Tender Beast by Eugen Doga	The Great Gatsby; Young and Beautiful by Lana Del Rey; A Little Party Never Killed Nobody by Fergie, Q-Tip, GoonRock	
2014–2015	Samba: Shiki Boom Boom; Rhumba: La Playa by Chayanne; Samba: Cocorito	Argentine tango: Tango de Besame by Roni Benise; El Dia Despues by Carlos Libedinsky; Besos by Beata Soderberg	Crazy in Love performed by Kadebostany
2013–2014	Puttin' On the Ritz by Irving Berlin; Fever	Il Mirto E La Rosa by Alessandro Safina	Behind Blue Eyes by Limp Bizkit
2012–2013	Why Don't You Do Right? by Amy Irving; Land of a Thousand Dances by Wilson Pickett	Maktub (from O Clone); Inta Eih by Nancy Ajram; Ya habibi yalla by Ishtar and the Gipsy Kings	Still by Emin
2011–2012	Una Notte a Napoli by Pink Martini; Another Cha Cha	Mala Luna by Gino Vannelli	Still by Emin

== Competitive highlights ==
GP: Grand Prix; CS: Challenger Series; JGP: Junior Grand Prix

=== With Popova ===
International
Event	16–17	17–18	18–19	19–20
GP Finland			7th	
GP France			8th	
GP Rostelecom Cup		6th		
GP Skate Canada				8th
CS Finlandia Trophy		5th		3rd
CS Golden Spin	5th		3rd	
CS Nepela Trophy		3rd	3rd	4th
CS Warsaw Cup		1st		
Volvo Open Cup			1st	
Universiade			1st	
National
Russian Champ.		4th	4th	
TBD = Assigned; WD = Withdrew

=== With Yanovskaya ===
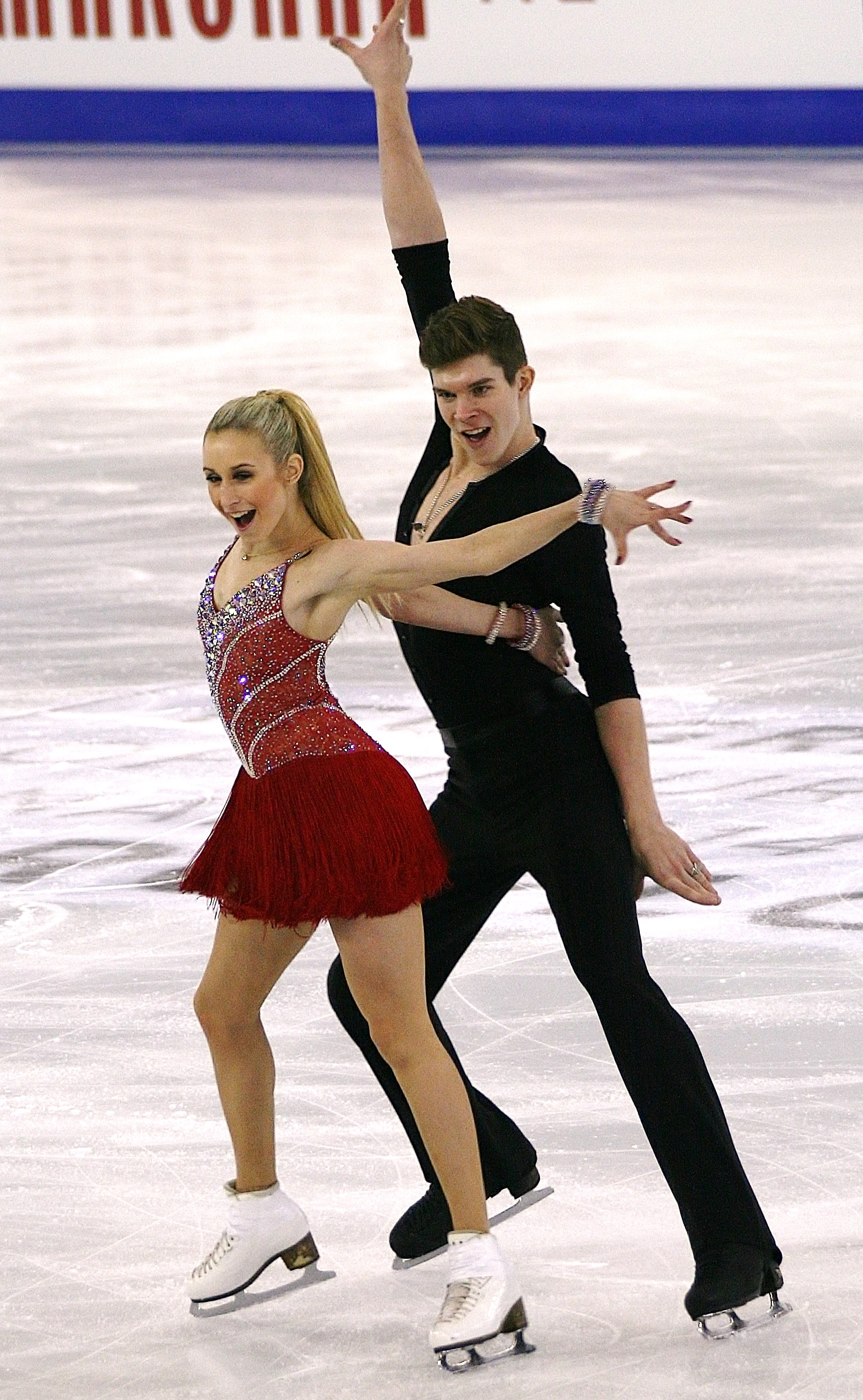
Yanovskaya/Mozgov at the 2014–15 Junior Grand Prix Final

International
Event	11–12	12–13	13–14	14–15	15–16
GP Bompard					6th
GP Skate America					6th
International: Junior
Junior Worlds	4th		2nd	1st	
Youth Olympics	1st				
JGP Final	2nd	4th	1st	1st	
JGP Austria		2nd			
JGP Croatia				1st	
JGP Estonia	1st		1st	1st	
JGP Poland	3rd				
JGP Slovakia			1st		
JGP Slovenia		2nd			
Ice Star			1st J		
Volvo Open Cup		1st J	1st J		
National
Russian Champ.					6th
Russian Jr. Champ.	4th	3rd	2nd	1st	
Team events
Youth Olympics	6th 1st P				
J = Junior level

=== With Baturintseva ===
International
Event	2010–11
Pavel Roman Memorial	3rd J
NRW Trophy	2nd J
Bavarian Open	2nd J
National
Russian Junior Championships	9th
J = Junior level

=== With Kosigina ===
International
Event	2008–09	2009–10
JGP Hungary		5th
NRW Trophy	5th J	
National
Russian Junior Champ.	11th	12th
J = Junior level

== Detailed results ==
Small medals for short and free programs awarded only at ISU Championships. At team events, medals awarded for team results only.

=== With Popova ===
2019–20 season
Date	Event	RD	FD	Total
25–27 October 2019	2019 Skate Canada	6; 71.44	8; 102.10	8; 173.54
11–13 October 2019	2019 CS Finlandia Trophy	2; 72.11	3; 103.13	3; 175.24
19–21 September 2019	2019 CS Ondrej Nepela Memorial	4; 73.30	5; 100.82	4; 174.12
2018–19 season
Date	Event	RD	FD	Total
7–9 March 2019	2019 Winter Universiade	1; 71.46	2; 111.55	1; 183.01
19–23 December 2018	2019 Russian Championships	5; 69.62	4; 107.31	4; 176.93
5–8 December 2018	2018 CS Golden Spin of Zagreb	5; 62.84	3; 102.89	3; 165.73
23–25 November 2018	2018 Internationaux de France	8; 63.64	7; 99.54	8; 163.18
6–11 November 2018	2018 Volvo Open Cup	1; 64.31	1; 104.16	1; 168.47
2–4 November 2018	2018 Grand Prix of Helsinki	7; 62.35	8; 95.21	7; 157.56
19–22 September 2018	2018 CS Ondrej Nepela Trophy	3; 67.65	3; 102.82	3; 170.47
2017–18 season
Date	Event	SD	FD	Total
21–24 December 2017	2018 Russian Championships	5; 63.27	3; 104.43	4; 167.70
16–19 November 2017	2017 CS Warsaw Cup	1; 64.38	1; 99.69	1; 164.07
20–22 October 2017	2017 Rostelecom Cup	6; 64.14	6; 99.88	6; 164.02
6–8 October 2017	2017 CS Finlandia Trophy	7; 57.36	3; 94.92	5; 152.28
21–23 September 2017	2017 CS Ondrej Nepela Trophy	3; 60.98	2; 100.94	3; 161.92
2016–17 season
Date	Event	SD	FD	Total
7–10 December 2016	2016 CS Golden Spin of Zagreb	4; 60.70	5; 94.52	5; 155.22

=== With Yanovskaya ===
2015–16 season
Date	Event	SD	FD	Total
24–27 December 2015	2016 Russian Championships	6; 57.92	6; 81.94	6; 139.86
13–15 November 2015	2015 ISU Grand Prix Trophée Éric Bompard	6; 52.88	Cancelled	6; 52.88
23–25 October 2015	2015 ISU Grand Prix Skate America	5; 53.35	6; 87.57	6; 140.92

2014–15 season
Date	Event	Level	SD	FD	Total
2–8 March 2015	2015 World Junior Championships	Junior	1; 62.22	1; 93.70	1; 155.92
4–7 February 2015	2015 Russian Junior Championships	Junior	1; 65.24	1; 98.35	1; 163.59
11–14 December 2014	2014–15 JGP Final	Junior	1; 59.12	1; 89.46	1; 148.58
8–12 October 2014	2014 JGP Croatia	Junior	1; 56.79	1; 88.55	1; 145.34
24–28 September 2014	2014 JGP Estonia	Junior	2; 59.56	1; 92.44	1; 152.00
2013–14 season
Date	Event	Level	SD	FD	Total
10–16 March 2014	2014 World Junior Championships	Junior	2; 63.80	1; 91.36	2; 155.16
22–25 January 2014	2014 Russian Junior Championships	Junior	2; 64.79	2; 86.96	2; 151.75
5–8 December 2013	2013–14 JGP Final	Junior	1; 63.71	1; 88.77	1; 152.48
10–12 October 2013	2013 JGP Estonia	Junior	1; 61.79	1; 88.19	1; 149.98
12–14 September 2013	2013 JGP Slovakia	Junior	1; 59.06	1; 84.33	1; 143.39
2012–13 season
Date	Event	Level	SD	FD	Total
31 January – 3 February 2013	2013 Russian Junior Championships	Junior	4; 55.15	1; 87.73	3; 142.88
6–9 December 2012	2012–13 JGP Final	Junior	3; 53.03	4; 76.28	4; 129.31
2011–12 season
Date	Event	Level	SD	FD	Total
2–3 March 2012	2012 World Junior Championships	Junior	3; 58.89	4; 81.74	4; 140.63
5–7 February 2012	2012 Russian Junior Championships	Junior	4; 55.47	3; 80.94	4; 136.41
13–22 January 2012	2012 Winter Youth Olympics - team event	Junior		1; 84.55	6
13–22 January 2012	2012 Winter Youth Olympics	Junior	1; 60.19	1; 86.77	1; 146.96
8–11 December 2011	2011–12 JGP Final	Junior	2; 56.22	3; 80.39	2; 136.61
