= Park So-youn (figure skater) =

South Korean figure skater (born 1997)

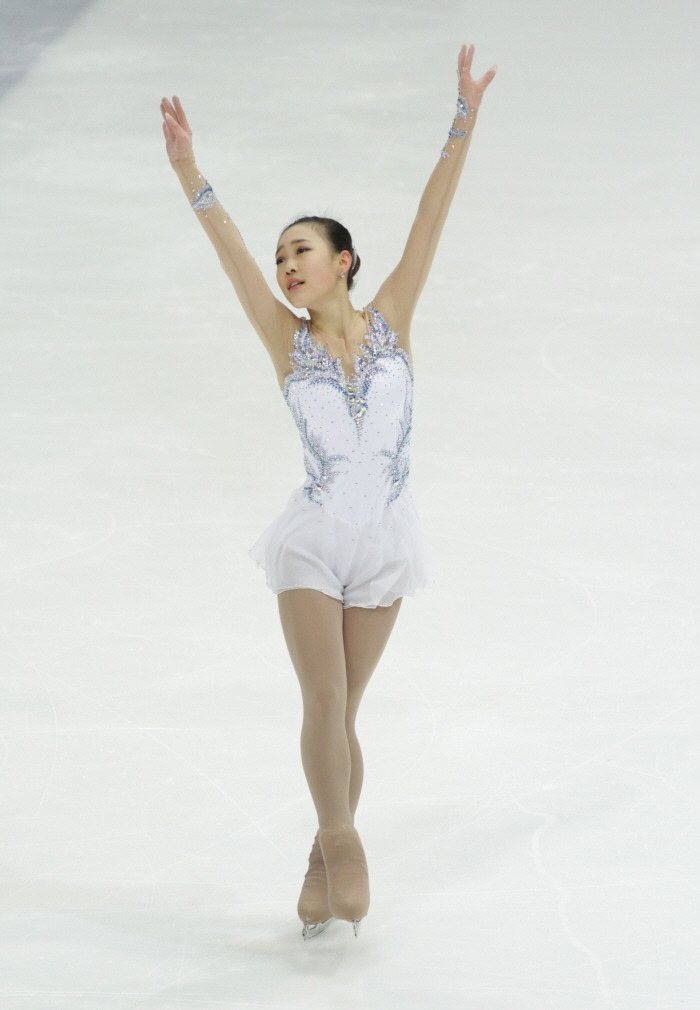
- Park at the 2014 South Korean Nationals

Personal information
- Native name: 박소연
- Other names: Park So-yeon
- Born: October 24, 1997 (age 29) Naju, South Jeolla Province, South Korea
- Home town: Seoul, South Korea
- Height: 1.60 m (5 ft 3 in)

Figure skating career
- Country: South Korea
- Coach: Chi Hyun-jung
- Began skating: 2004
- Retired: June 11, 2019
Medal record
Ladies' Figure skating
South Korean Championships
Gold medal – first place	2015 Seoul	Women's singles
Silver medal – second place	2011 Seoul	Women's singles
Silver medal – second place	2012 Seoul	Women's singles
Silver medal – second place	2013 Seoul	Women's singles
Silver medal – second place	2014 Goyang	Women's singles
Bronze medal – third place	2010 Seoul	Women's singles
Representing Mixed-NOCs
Winter Youth Olympics
Bronze medal – third place	2012 Innsbruck	Team

- Park So-youn
- Hangul: 박소연
- RR: Bak Soyeon
- MR: Pak Soyŏn

Park So-youn (Korean: 박소연; born October 24, 1997) is a former South Korean competitive figure skater. She is the 2012 Asian Open Figure Skating Trophy champion, the 2014 Asian Open Figure Skating Trophy bronze medalist, the 2015 South Korean national champion, and a three-time South Korean national silver medalist (2012–2014).

On the junior level, she is the 2012 Youth Olympic team event bronze medalist, the 2012 JGP Turkey silver medalist, and the 2011 Asian Open Figure Skating Trophy silver medalist.

She placed 4th at the 2012 Winter Youth Olympics and 21st at the 2014 Winter Olympics.

== Personal life ==
Park was born on October 24, 1997 in Naju, South Jeolla Province, South Korea. She studied at Dankook University's Department of International Sports Studies.

In February 2025, Park married former Uzbekistani men's singles competitive figure skater, Misha Ge.

== Career ==
=== Early years and junior career ===
Park began skating when she was eight years old, in the first grade of elementary school. In 2009, she became the youngest Korean national team member, aged 13. She began competing on the ISU Junior Grand Prix series in 2011.

In the 2012–13 season, Park won gold on the senior level at the Asian Trophy and a silver medal at a JGP event in Turkey. She then won her third national silver medal and was sent to her first World Junior Championships, where she placed 12th. In 2013, Park said her goal was to compete at the 2018 Winter Olympics in Pyeongchang.

=== 2013–14 season: Senior international debut ===
In August, at South Korea Trials for Junior Grand Prix, she placed 1st in the short program and 8th in the free skate, which resulted in 5th place overall. She was not selected to compete at the 2013–14 ISU Junior Grand Prix. She changed her free program for the Korean Nationals. At the 2014 South Korean Championships, she won the silver medal, 49.69 points behind Kim Yuna.

Park made her senior international debut at the 2014 Four Continents Championships. She placed 8th in the short program and 9th in the free skating, finished 9th with the combined total of 162.71. She was selected to represent her country at the 2014 Winter Olympics with her national teammates, Kim Yuna and Kim Hae-jin. She was 23rd after the short program, barely advancing to the free skate. After the free skate, she placed 21st overall. At the 2014 World Championships, she had a clean free program and placed 9th overall. She scored 176.71 points, setting personal bests in all three segments.

=== 2014–15 season: First national title ===
Park made her Grand Prix debut at the 2014 Skate America. She placed 5th in both segments and 5th overall. At the 2014 Rostelecom Cup, she placed 7th in the short program, 4th in the free skate and 5th overall.

At the 2015 South Korean Championships, Park won both the short program and free skate to take her first national title. At the 2015 Four Continents she placed 10th in the short program, 9th in the free skate, and 9th overall.

At the 2015 World Championships, Park placed 15th in the short program, 9th in the free skate, and 12th overall. Her placement helped earn two spots for South Korea in the ladies event for the 2016 World Championships.

=== 2015–16 season ===
Park received two 2015–16 Grand Prix assignments. She began her season by finishing 4th at 2015 Finlandia Trophy. Turning to the Grand Prix series, she placed 9th at 2015 Skate America and 8th at 2015 Cup of China.

Park then went on to finish 5th at the 2016 South Korean Championships, but was still named for the 2016 Four Continents and World teams since three of the four skaters that finished ahead of her were ineligible for the senior level. At Four Continents, she skated a personal best short program with a score of 62.49 points, placing in the top five in the short program and beating her season's best by 8.71 points. She went on to score 116.43 points in the free skate and a total score of 178.92 points placing fourth overall. Her total score was a personal best and beat her season's best by 14.64 points.

She finished her season with an eighteenth place finish at the 2016 World Championships.

=== 2016–17 season ===
Park began her season with a fourth place finish at the 2016 Asian Open. She then competed on the Challenger Series, finishing fifth at the 2016 Lombardia Trophy and fourth at the 2016 Nebelhorn Trophy.

Park placed 8th at the 2016 Skate America and then 5th at the 2016 Trophée de France. She fractured her left ankle during a training session on December 13, 2016, which caused her to withdraw from the 2017 South Korean Championships, 2017 Winter Universiade and the 2017 Asian Winter Games.

=== 2017–18 season ===
Park had to undergo four surgeries while recovering from the ankle injury from the previous season. She participated in all three stages of the national selection process for the 2018 Winter Olympic Games, but could not get hold of a ticket.

Park finished in twelfth place at her lone Grand Prix assignment, the 2017 NHK Trophy. She finished in fifth at the 2018 South Korean Championships. She was named to the 2018 Four Continents Championships, where she placed twelfth in the short program and ninth in the free skate to finish in eleventh overall.

=== 2018–19 season ===
Park began her season at the 2018 Alpen Trophy, where finished eighth overall. She placed 4th at the 2019 South Korean Championships and was subsequently assigned to the 2019 Winter Universiade, where she placed tenth in the short program but fourth in the free skate to finish in fifth overall.

She participated in All That Skate 2019, then announced her retirement from competition. She joined the cast for a Cirque du Soleil show.

== Skating technique ==
Park can land 3S-3T and 2A-3T combinations.

== Programs ==
Season	Short program	Free skating	Exhibition
2018–2019	The Man with the Golden Arm by Billy May choreo. by Cindy Stuart	Titanic by James Horner choreo. by Cindy Stuart	7 Rings / Problem by Ariana Grande choreo. by Shin Yea-ji; Amazing Grace performed by Hayley Westenra choreo. by Cindy Stuart
2017–2018	Black Swan by Clint Mansell choreo. by Cindy Stuart	En Aranjuez con mi amor by Joaquín Rodrigo performed by Nana Mouskouri choreo. by David Wilson	This Is Me by Benj Pasek and Justin Paul
2016–2017	The Man with the Golden Arm by Billy May choreo. by Cindy Stuart	En Aranjuez con mi amor by Joaquín Rodrigo performed by Nana Mouskouri choreo. by David Wilson	Amazing Grace performed by Hayley Westenra choreo. by Cindy Stuart
2015–2016	Black Orpheus by Luiz Bonfá choreo. by Cindy Stuart	Romeo & Juliet by Abel Korzeniowski choreo. by David Wilson; The Red Violin by John Corigliano choreo. by Cindy Stuart	Dear Future Husband by Meghan Trainor choreo. by Cindy Stuart
2014–2015	Introduction and Rondo Capriccioso by Camille Saint-Saëns choreo. by David Wilson	Romeo & Juliet by Abel Korzeniowski choreo. by David Wilson	I Dreamed a Dream by Idina Menzel (from Glee) choreo. by Cindy Stuart
2013–2014	The Swan (from The Carnival of the Animals) by Camille Saint-Saëns choreo. by Cindy Stuart	Rhapsody on a Theme of Paganini by Sergei Rachmaninoff choreo. by Cindy Stuart; As you like it by Patrick Doyle; Spirited Away by Joe Hisaishi choreo. by Cindy Stuart	I Dreamed a Dream by Idina Menzel (from Glee) choreo. by Cindy Stuart
2012–2013	Piano Trio In A Minor II : Pantoum by Maurice Ravel	West Side Story by Leonard Bernstein	Poème by Secret Garden
2011–2012	Poème by Secret Garden	Elizabeth: The Golden Age by Craig Armstrong	They Can't Take That Away from Me sung by Peggy Lee by George Gershwin
2010–2011	Csárdás by Vittorio Monti	Malaguena by Ernesto Lecuona	Roxie (from Chicago) by John Kander
2009–2010	Carousel Waltz (from Carousel) by Richard Rodgers	Yentl by Michel Legrand	Once Upon a December (from Anastasia) by Stephen Flaherty
2008–2009	Kalinka by Ivan Larionov	It Ain't Necessarily So by George Gershwin	So long, Farewell (from The Sound of Music) by Richard Rodgers
2007–2008	The Swan (from The Carnival of the Animals) by Camille Saint-Saëns	Aragonaise (from Carmen) by Georges Bizet	

== Competitive highlights ==
=== 2011–12 to present ===
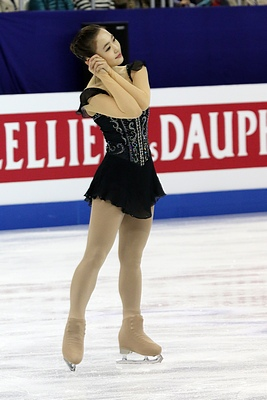
Park at the 2015 World Figure Skating Championships.

GP: Grand Prix; CS: Challenger Series; JGP: Junior Grand Prix

International
Event	11–12	12–13	13–14	14–15	15–16	16–17	17–18	18–19
Olympics			21st					
Worlds			9th	12th	18th			
Four Continents			9th	9th	4th	WD	11th	
GP Skate America				5th	9th	8th		
GP Cup of China					8th			
GP France						5th		
GP Rostelecom				5th			WD	
GP NHK Trophy							12th	
CS Alpen Trophy								8th
CS Finlandia					4th			
CS Lombardia						5th		
CS Nebelhorn						4th		
Asian Games						WD		
Asian Trophy		1st		3rd		4th		
Winter Universiade						WD		5th
International: Junior
Youth Olympics	4th							
Junior Worlds		12th						
JGP Austria	6th							
JGP Italy	4th							
JGP Turkey		2nd						
JGP U.S.		6th						
Asian Trophy	2nd							
National
South Korean Champ.	2nd	2nd	2nd	1st	5th	WD	5th	4th
Team events
Youth Olympics	3rd T 1st P							
TBD = Assigned, WD = Withdrew; Levels: J = Junior; T = Team result; P = Personal result; Medals awarded for team result only.

=== 2008–09 to 2010–11 : Pre-junior international debut ===
International: Novice
Event	2008–09	2009–10	2010–11
Children's Games			2nd N
NZ Winter Games		1st N	
National
South Korea	2nd J	3rd	2nd
Levels: J = Junior; N = Novice;

== Detailed results ==
=== Senior level ===
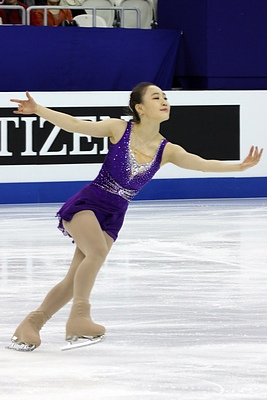
Park at the 2015 World Figure Skating Championships.

**2018–19 season**
Date	Event	SP	FS	Total
March 6–9, 2019	2019 Winter Universiade	10; 52.71	4; 122.95	5; 175.66
January 11–13, 2019	2019 South Korean Championships	5; 62.07	5; 114.67	4; 176.74
November 14–17, 2018	2018 CS Inge Solar Memorial - Alpen Trophy	3; 58.94	9; 94.00	8; 152.94
**2017–18 season**
Date	Event	SP	FS	Total
January 22–28, 2018	2018 Four Continents Championships	12; 53.05	9; 106.43	11; 159.48
January 5–7, 2018	2018 South Korean Championships	5; 62.74	6; 113.83	5; 176.57
November 10–12, 2017	2017 NHK Trophy	11; 51.54	12; 84.25	12; 135.79
**2016–17 season**
Date	Event	SP	FS	Total
November 11–13, 2016	2016 Trophée de France	6; **64.89**	4; **120.30**	5; **185.19**
October 21–23, 2016	2016 Skate America	7; 58.16	8; 103.20	8; 161.36
September 22–24, 2016	2016 CS Nebelhorn Trophy	5; 55.71	4; 106.24	4; 161.95
September 8–11, 2016	2016 CS Lombardia Trophy	4; 56.93	5; 99.92	5; 156.85
August 4–7, 2016	2016 Asian Figure Skating Trophy	3; 48.02	4; 80.93	4; 128.95
**2015–16 season**
Date	Event	SP	FS	Total
March 28– April, 2016	2016 World Championships	22; 52.27	18; 101.97	18; 154.24
February 16–21, 2016	2016 Four Continents Championships	5; 62.49	7; 116.43	4; 178.92
January 8–10, 2016	2016 South Korean Championships	6; 55.34	6; 105.73	5; 161.07
November 6–8, 2015	2015 Cup of China	10; 52.47	6; 111.81	8; 164.28
October 23–25, 2015	2015 Skate America	10; 53.78	9; 105.88	9; 159.66
October 9–11, 2015	2015 CS Finlandia Trophy	6; 51.51	3; 108.42	4; 159.93
**2014–15 season**
Date	Event	SP	FS	Total
March 23–29, 2015	2015 World Championships	15; 53.95	9; 106.80	12; 160.75
February 9–15, 2015	2015 Four Continents Championships	10; 53.47	9; 110.28	9; 163.75
January 5–9, 2015	2015 South Korean Championships	1; 60.40	1; 113.99	1; 174.39
November 14–16, 2014	2014 Rostelecom Cup	7; 53.71	4; 109.53	5; 163.24
October 24–26, 2014	2014 Skate America	5; 55.74	5; 114.69	5; 170.43
August 6–10, 2014	2014 Asian Figure Skating Trophy	5; 49.20	1; 111.29	3; 160.49
**2013–14 season**
Date	Event	SP	FS	Total
March 24–30, 2014	2014 World Championships	13; 57.22	9; 119.39	9; 176.61
February 6–22, 2014	2014 Winter Olympics	23; 49.14	19; 93.83	21; 142.97
January 20–26, 2014	2014 Four Continents Championships	8; 55.91	9; 106.80	9; 162.71
January 1–5, 2014	2014 South Korean Championships	5; 52.31	2; 125.86	2; 178.17

=== Junior level ===
At team events, medals awarded for team results only.

**2012–13 season**
Date	Event	Level	SP	FS	Total
February 25 – March 3, 2013	2013 World Junior Championships	Junior	14; 47.24	12; 88.18	12; 135.42
January 2–6, 2013	2013 South Korean Championships	Senior	3; 53.20	2; 108.68	2; 161.88
September 19–22, 2012	2012 JGP Turkey	Junior	1; 51.45	3; 93.32	2; 144.77
August 29 – September 1, 2012	2012 JGP USA	Junior	2; 52.33	7; 85.04	6; 137.37
August 8–12, 2012	2012 Asian Figure Skating Trophy	Senior	1; 49.67	1; 86.46	1; 136.13
**2011–12 season**
Date	Event	Level	SP	FS	Total
January 14–22, 2012	2012 Winter Youth Olympic Games – Team	Junior	–	1; 96.84	3
January 14–22, 2012	2012 Winter Youth Olympic Games	Junior	5; 48.37	4; 88.23	4; 136.60
January 4–8, 2012	2012 South Korean Championships	Senior	2; 51.43	3; 93.16	2; 144.59
October 5–8, 2011	2011 JGP Italy	Junior	4; 49.06	4; 95.65	4; 144.71
September 28 – October 1, 2011	2011 JGP Austria	Junior	8; 46.27	6; 84.92	6; 131.19
August 23–26, 2011	2011 Asian Figure Skating Trophy	Junior	3; 43.40	2; 82.30	2; 125.70

**2010–11 season**
Date	Event	Level	SP	FS	Total
January 27–30, 2011	2011 International Children's Winter Games	Novice	1; 39.33	5; 49.09	2; 88.42
January 12–16, 2011	2011 South Korean Championships	Senior	2; 48.82	2; 93.47	2; 142.29
**2009–10 season**
Date	Event	Level	SP	FS	Total
January 7–10, 2010	2010 South Korean Championships	Senior	4; 42.78	3; 84.99	3; 127.77
August 28–30, 2009	2009 New Zealand Winter Games	Novice	1; 44.50	1; 62.93	1; 107.43
**2008–09 season**
Date	Event	Level	SP	FS	Total
January 7–10, 2009	2009 South Korean Championships	Junior	2; 37.18	2; 65.85	2; 103.03

- ISU personal bests highlighted in **bold**.
