= Maria Simonova =

Russian ice dancer

Personal information
- Full name: Maria Andreyevna Simonova
- Born: 7 January 1996 (age 30) Tolyatti, Russia
- Home town: Tolyatti, Russia
- Height: 1.66 m (5 ft 5 1/2 in)

Figure skating career
- Country: Russia
- Partner: Dmitri Dragun
- Coach: Oleg Sudakov
- Skating club: Lokomotiv
- Began skating: 2002
Medal record
Figure skating: Ice dancing
Representing Russia
Winter Youth Olympics
| Bronze medal – third place | 2012 Innsbruck | Ice dancing |
Representing Mixed-NOCs
Winter Youth Olympics
| Silver medal – second place | 2012 Innsbruck | Team |

Maria Andreyevna Simonova (Russian: Мария Андреевна Симонова; born 7 January 1996) is a Russian ice dancer. With partner Dmitri Dragun, she is the 2012 Youth Olympics bronze medalist.

== Programs ==
(with Dragun)

| Season | Short dance | Free dance |
|---|---|---|
| 2012–2013 | Blues: Swing: | The Nightmare Before Christmas by Danny Elfman |
| 2011–2012 | Sway | Peer Gynt by Edvard Grieg: Morning Mood; In the Hall of the Mountain King |

== Competitive highlights ==
(with Dragun)

International
| Event | 2010–11 | 2011–12 | 2012–13 |
|---|---|---|---|
| Youth Olympics | | 3rd | |
| JGP Austria | | | 8th |
| JGP Romania | | 6th | |
| NRW Trophy | | | 4th J. |
National
| Russian Junior Champ. | 8th | 7th | 8th |
Team events
| Youth Olympics | | 2nd T (3rd P) | |
JGP = Junior Grand Prix; J. = Junior level T = Team result; P = Personal result; Medals awarded for team result only.
