= Anna Yanovskaya =

Russian ice dancer (born 1996)

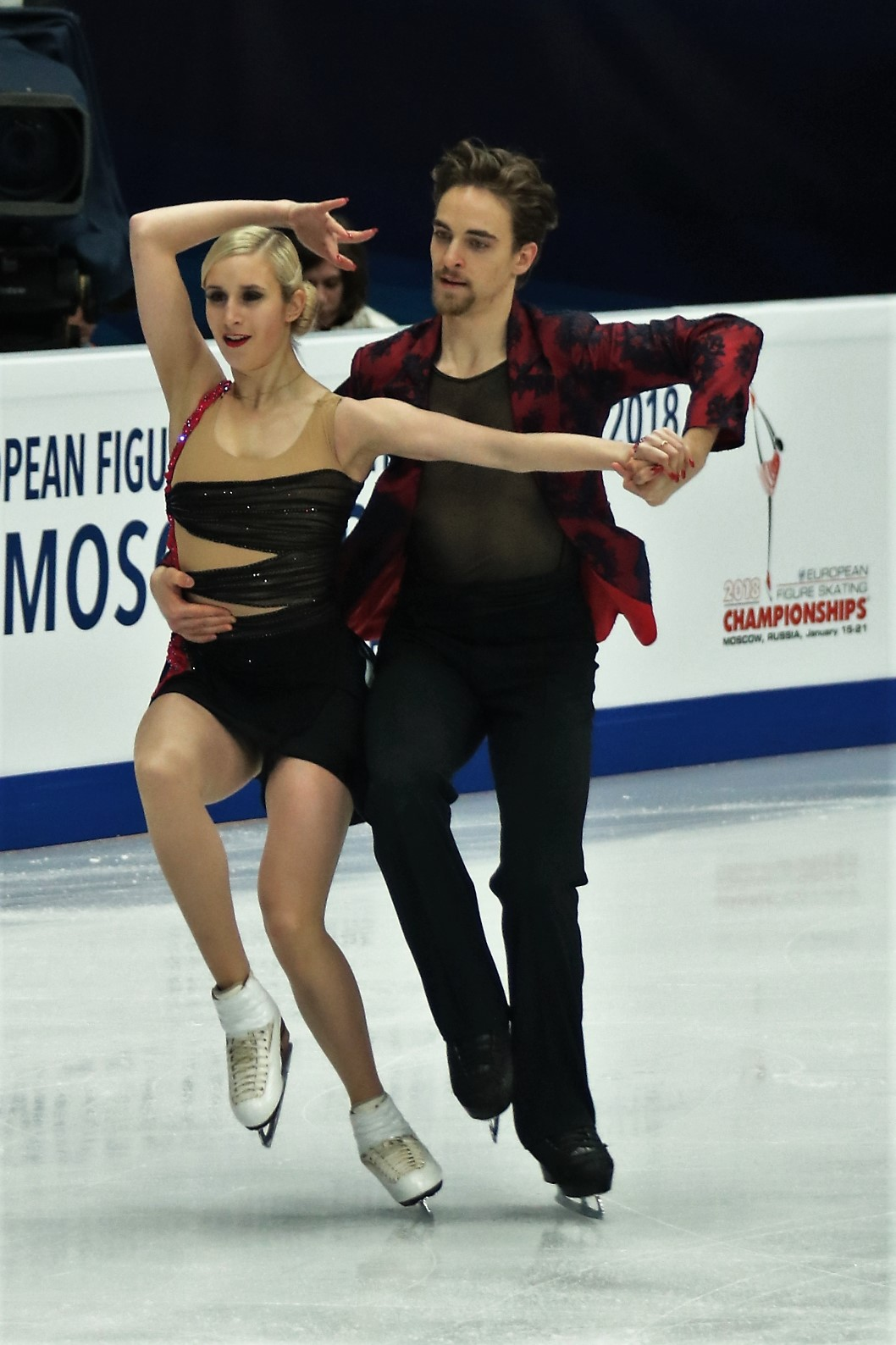
- Yanovskaya/Lukács in 2018

Personal information
- Native name: Анна Святославовна Яновская
- Full name: Anna Sviatoslavovna Yanovskaya
- Other names: Anna Yanovskaia
- Born: 23 November 1996 (age 29) Dubai, United Arab Emirates
- Home town: Moscow, Russia
- Height: 1.71 m (5 ft 7 1/2 in)

Figure skating career
- Country: Hungary
- Partner: Ádám Lukács
- Coach: Irina Zhuk
- Skating club: Blue Bird FSC
- Began skating: 2000
Medal record
Representing Russia
Figure skating: Ice dancing
Winter Youth Olympics
| Gold medal – first place | 2012 Innsbruck | Ice dancing |
World Junior Championships
| Gold medal – first place | 2015 Tallinn | Ice dancing |
| Silver medal – second place | 2014 Sofia | Ice dancing |
Junior Grand Prix Final
| Gold medal – first place | 2013–14 Fukuoka | Ice dancing |
| Gold medal – first place | 2014–15 Barcelona | Ice dancing |
| Silver medal – second place | 2011–12 Quebec | Ice dancing |

Anna Sviatoslavovna Yanovskaya (Russian: Анна Святославовна Яновская; born 23 November 1996) is a Russian ice dancer. Competing for Hungary with Ádám Lukács, she is a three-time Hungarian national champion (2018–19, 2021) and has competed in the final segment at three ISU Championships.

With her former skating partner, Sergey Mozgov, she is the 2015 World Junior champion, two-time (2013, 2014) JGP Final champion, the 2012 Youth Olympics champion, the 2014 World Junior silver medalist, and the 2015 Russian junior national champion.

== Early career ==
Yanovskaya began skating at age four, having become interested after watching it on television. Early in her career, she competed with Filipp Dolzhansky. She teamed up with Egor Kosheev in 2008 and skated with him until the end of the 2010–11 season. Their partnership ended when she grew too tall for him.

== Partnership with Mozgov ==
Yanovskaya teamed up with Sergey Mozgov in 2011. They were coached mainly by Svetlana Alexeeva at the Medvedkovo rink in Moscow.

=== 2011–12 season: First season together ===
Yanovskaya/Mozgov won the bronze medal at their first Junior Grand Prix event, in Gdańsk, Poland, and then gold in Tallinn, Estonia. Their placements qualified them for the Junior Grand Prix Final, where they placed second in the short dance, third in the free, and took the silver medal ahead of Alexandra Stepanova / Ivan Bukin. After winning the gold medal at the 2012 Winter Youth Olympics, they placed fourth at the 2012 Russian Junior Championships. At the 2012 World Junior Championships, they were third in the short dance. During the free dance the referee stopped their music because Mozgov's left bootstrap had come loose. Yanovskaya/Mozgov finished fourth overall behind American ice dancers Alexandra Aldridge / Daniel Eaton who moved up the rankings and took the bronze medal.

=== 2012–13 season ===
In 2012–13, Yanovskaya/Mozgov won a pair of silver medals at JGP events in Austria and Slovenia and qualified for the JGP Final in Sochi, Russia, where they finished fourth. They won the bronze medal at the 2013 Russian Junior Championships.

=== 2013–14 season: First JGP Final title ===
In 2013–14, Yanovskaya/Mozgov began their season by taking gold at the 2013 JGP Slovakia in Košice. They won another gold at the 2013 JGP Estonia, qualifying them for their third JGP Final in Fukuoka, Japan. Setting personal bests, Yanovskaya/Mozgov placed first in both segments at the final and won the gold medal ahead of Kaitlin Hawayek / Jean-Luc Baker. After placing second to Stepanova/Bukin at the 2014 Russian Junior Championships, they took the silver medal at the 2014 World Junior Championships in Sofia, finishing second to Hawayek/Baker.

=== 2014–15 season: World Junior title ===
Yanovskaya/Mozgov decided to remain in the junior ranks in the 2014–15 season. In addition to Moscow, they also trained in Liepāja in the summer. Mozgov recovered from a knee injury early in the season. In the 2014–15 JGP series, the duo won gold medals in Estonia and Croatia, earning qualification to their fourth JGP Final. At the event, held in December in Barcelona, they outscored Alla Loboda / Pavel Drozd for the gold and stood atop the podium for the second consecutive year. In March, they competed at the 2016 World Junior Championships in Tallinn, Estonia. Ranked first in both segments, they were awarded the gold medal ahead of Lorraine McNamara / Quinn Carpenter.

=== 2015–16 season: Senior debut and split ===
Although still age-eligible for junior events in the 2015–16 season, the duo decided to move up to the senior ranks. Yanovskaya injured her back and chin due to a fall on a lift during the summer but recovered "fully and quickly". Debuting on the Grand Prix, Yanovskaya/Mozgov placed sixth at the 2015 Skate America and 2015 Trophée Éric Bompard. In December, they finished sixth at the 2016 Russian Championships in Yekaterinburg.

Mozgov ended the partnership on 4 April 2016. In May 2016, Yanovskaya said that she was searching for a new partner.

== Later partnerships ==
On 16 June 2016, Irina Zhuk reported that Yanovskaya had formed a partnership with Ivan Gurianov, with the duo to be coached by Zhuk. They never competed together.

In December 2016, Yanovskaya teamed up with Ádám Lukács to compete for Hungary. Making their competitive debut, the duo placed 12th at the Bavarian Open in February 2017.

== Programs ==
=== With Lukacs ===
| Season | Short dance | Free dance |
|---|---|---|
| 2021–2022 | Blues: Come Together; Hip Hop: Smooth Criminal by Michael Jackson | Hymne à l'amour performed by Patricia Kaas |
| 2020–2021 | Grease | Hymne à l'amour performed by Patricia Kaas |
| 2018–2019 | Flamenco: Tango: Armi | Selection of Music by Yellow |
| 2017–2018 | Whatever Happens by Michael Jackson; Limbo by Daddy Yankee | The Phantom of the Opera by Andrew Lloyd Webber |
| 2016–2017 | Why Don't You Do Right?; Jumping Jack performed by Big Bad Voodoo Daddy | The Phantom of the Opera by Andrew Lloyd Webber |

=== With Mozgov ===
| Season | Short dance | Free dance | Exhibition |
|---|---|---|---|
| 2015–2016 | March: Ribellione by Ennio Morricone; Waltz: My Sweet and Tender Beast by Eugen Doga | The Great Gatsby; Young and Beautiful by Lana Del Rey; A Little Party Never Killed Nobody by Fergie, Q-Tip, GoonRock | |
| 2014–2015 | Samba: Shiki Boom Boom; Rhumba: La Playa by Chayanne; Samba: Cocorito | Argentine tango: Tango de Besame by Roni Benise; El Dia Despues by Carlos Libedinsky; Besos by Beata Soderberg | Crazy in Love performed by Kadebostany |
| 2013–2014 | Puttin' On the Ritz by Irving Berlin; Fever | Il Mirto E La Rosa by Alessandro Safina | Behind Blue Eyes by Limp Bizkit |
| 2012–2013 | Why Don't You Do Right? by Amy Irving; Land of a Thousand Dances by Wilson Pickett | Maktub (from O Clone); Inta Eih by Nancy Ajram; Ya habibi yalla by Ishtar and the Gipsy Kings | Still by Emin |
| 2011–2012 | Una Notte a Napoli by Pink Martini; Another Cha Cha | Mala Luna by Gino Vannelli | Still by Emin |

== Competitive highlights ==
GP: Grand Prix; CS Challenger Series; JGP: Junior Grand Prix

=== With Lukács for Hungary ===
International
| Event | 16–17 | 17–18 | 18–19 | 19–20 | 20–21 | 21–22 |
|---|---|---|---|---|---|---|
| World Champ. | | 27th | 19th | | 23rd | |
| European Champ. | | 14th | 19th | | | |
| GP Rostelecom Cup | | | 7th | | 8th | |
| CS Finlandia Trophy | | | 8th | | | |
| CS Golden Spin | | | 5th | | | |
| CS Ice Star | | 7th | | | | |
| CS Lombardia Trophy | | | | | | 10th |
| CS Nebelhorn Trophy | | 12th | | | | 6th |
| Bavarian Open | 12th | | 5th | | | |
| Challenge Cup | | | | | 2nd | |
| Volvo Open | | 3rd | 6th | | | |
| Santa Claus Cup | | 2nd | | | WD | |
| Halloween Cup | | | 1st | | | |
National
| Hungarian Champs | | | 1st | 1st | | |
WD = Withdrew; TBD = Assigned

=== With Mozgov for Russia ===
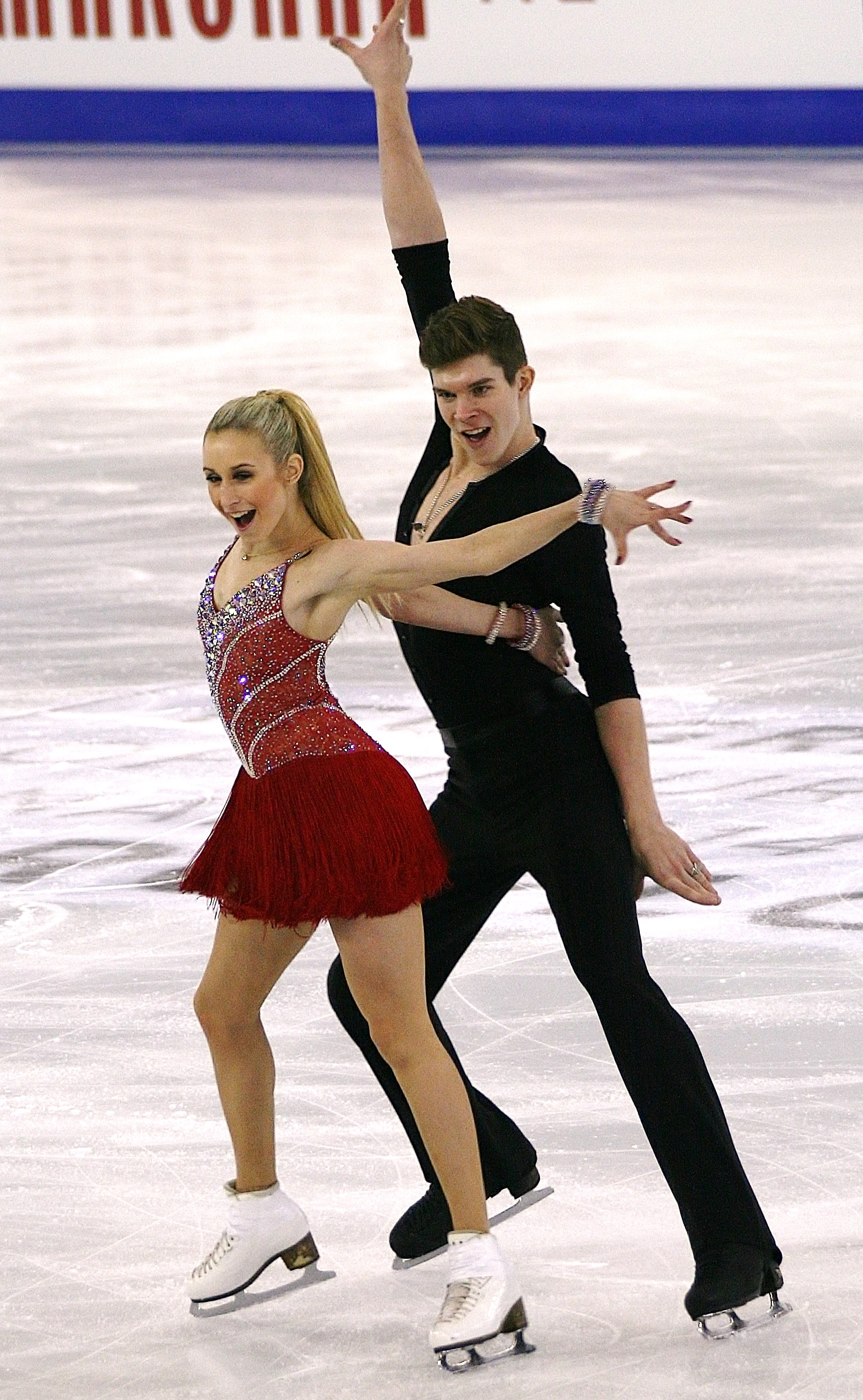
Yanovskaya/Mozgov at the 2014–15 Junior Grand Prix Final

International
| Event | 11–12 | 12–13 | 13–14 | 14–15 | 15–16 |
|---|---|---|---|---|---|
| GP Bompard | | | | | 6th |
| GP Skate America | | | | | 6th |
International: Junior
| Junior Worlds | 4th | | 2nd | 1st | |
| Youth Olympics | 1st | | | | |
| JGP Final | 2nd | 4th | 1st | 1st | |
| JGP Austria | | 2nd | | | |
| JGP Croatia | | | | 1st | |
| JGP Estonia | 1st | | 1st | 1st | |
| JGP Poland | 3rd | | | | |
| JGP Slovakia | | | 1st | | |
| JGP Slovenia | | 2nd | | | |
| Ice Star | | | 1st J | | |
| Volvo Open Cup | | 1st J | 1st J | | |
National
| Russian | | | | | 6th |
| Russian Junior | 4th | 3rd | 2nd | 1st | |
Team events
| Youth Olympics | 6th 1st P | | | | |
J = Junior level

=== With Kosheev for Russia ===
National
| Event | 2009–10 | 2010–11 |
|---|---|---|
| Russian Junior Championships | 13th | 7th |

== Detailed results ==
Small medals for short and free programs awarded only at ISU Championships. At team events, medals awarded for team results only.

=== With Mozgov ===
2015–16 season
| Date | Event | SD | FD | Total |
| 24–27 December 2015 | 2016 Russian Championships | 6; 57.92 | 6; 81.94 | 6; 139.86 |
| 13–15 November 2015 | 2015 ISU Grand Prix Trophée Éric Bompard | 6; 52.88 | Cancelled | 6; 52.88 |
| 23–25 October 2015 | 2015 ISU Grand Prix Skate America | 5; 53.35 | 6; 87.57 | 6; 140.92 |

2014–15 season
| Date | Event | Level | SD | FD | Total |
| 2–8 March 2015 | 2015 World Junior Championships | Junior | 1; 62.22 | 1; 93.70 | 1; 155.92 |
| 4–7 February 2015 | 2015 Russian Junior Championships | Junior | 1; 65.24 | 1; 98.35 | 1; 163.59 |
| 11–14 December 2014 | 2014–15 JGP Final | Junior | 1; 59.12 | 1; 89.46 | 1; 148.58 |
| 8–12 October 2014 | 2014 JGP Croatia | Junior | 1; 56.79 | 1; 88.55 | 1; 145.34 |
| 24–28 September 2014 | 2014 JGP Estonia | Junior | 2; 59.56 | 1; 92.44 | 1; 152.00 |
2013–14 season
| Date | Event | Level | SD | FD | Total |
| 10–16 March 2014 | 2014 World Junior Championships | Junior | 2; 63.80 | 1; 91.36 | 2; 155.16 |
| 22–25 January 2014 | 2014 Russian Junior Championships | Junior | 2; 64.79 | 2; 86.96 | 2; 151.75 |
| 5–8 December 2013 | 2013–14 JGP Final | Junior | 1; 63.71 | 1; 88.77 | 1; 152.48 |
| 10–12 October 2013 | 2013 JGP Estonia | Junior | 1; 61.79 | 1; 88.19 | 1; 149.98 |
| 12–14 September 2013 | 2013 JGP Slovakia | Junior | 1; 59.06 | 1; 84.33 | 1; 143.39 |
2012–13 season
| Date | Event | Level | SD | FD | Total |
| 31 January – 3 February 2013 | 2013 Russian Junior Championships | Junior | 4; 55.15 | 1; 87.73 | 3; 142.88 |
| 6–9 December 2012 | 2012–13 JGP Final | Junior | 3; 53.03 | 4; 76.28 | 4; 129.31 |
2011–12 season
| Date | Event | Level | SD | FD | Total |
| 2–3 March 2012 | 2012 World Junior Championships | Junior | 3; 58.89 | 4; 81.74 | 4; 140.63 |
| 5–7 February 2012 | 2012 Russian Junior Championships | Junior | 4; 55.47 | 3; 80.94 | 4; 136.41 |
| 13–22 January 2012 | 2012 Winter Youth Olympics - team event | Junior | | 1; 84.55 | 6 |
| 13–22 January 2012 | 2012 Winter Youth Olympics | Junior | 1; 60.19 | 1; 86.77 | 1; 146.96 |
| 8–11 December 2011 | 2011–12 JGP Final | Junior | 2; 56.22 | 3; 80.39 | 2; 136.61 |
