= Feodosiy Efremenkov =

Russian figure skater

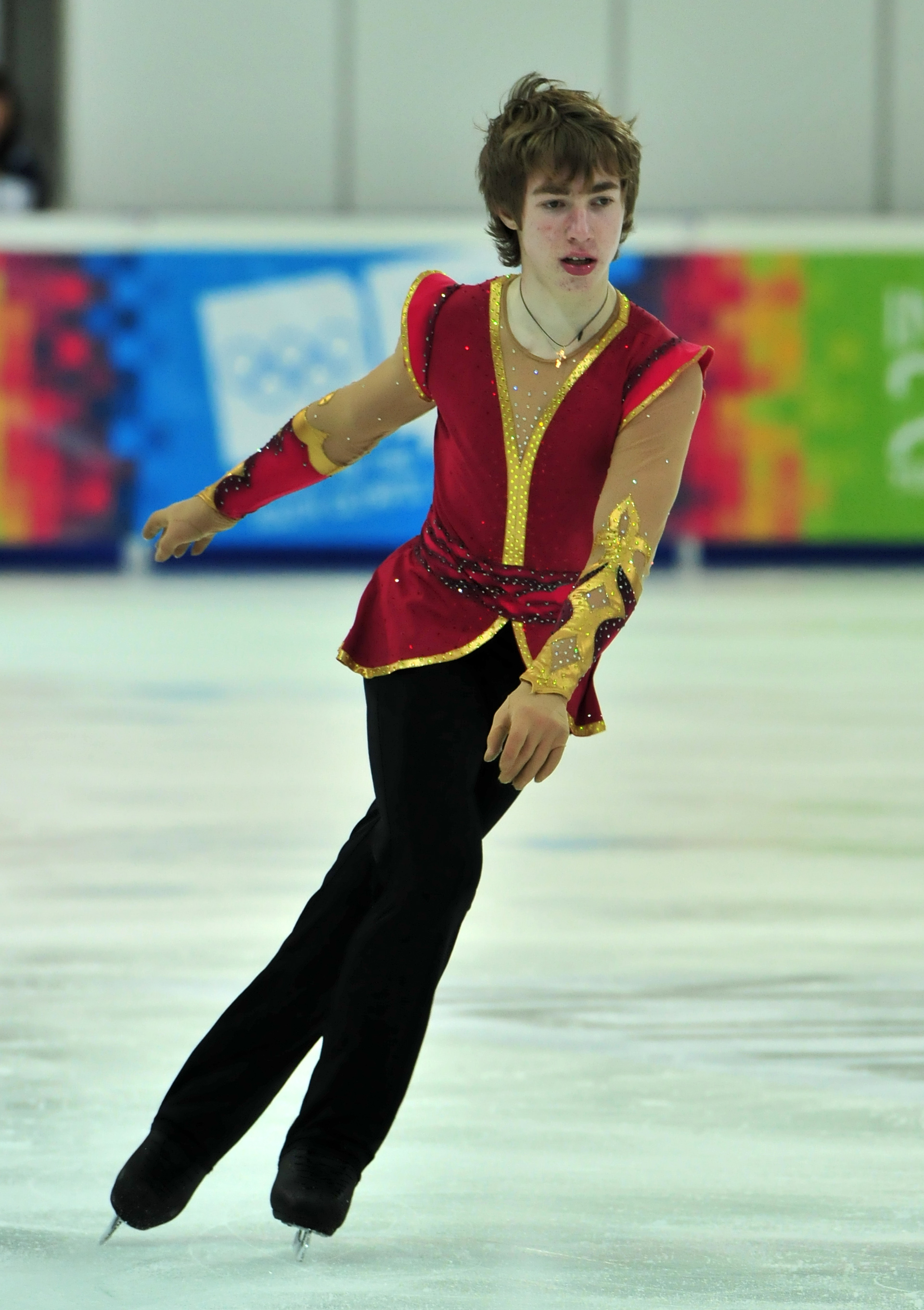
- Feodosiy Efremenkov at the 2012 Winter Youth Olympics

Personal information
- Full name: Feodosiy Yuryevich Efremenkov
- Born: 19 March 1996 (age 30) Klin, Russia
- Home town: Moscow, Russia
- Height: 1.66 m (5 ft 5 1/2 in)

Figure skating career
- Country: Russia
- Skating club: Iunost Moskvy
- Began skating: 2004
Medal record
Representing Russia
Figure skating: Men's singles
Winter Youth Olympics
Bronze medal – third place	2012 Innsbruck	Men's singles

Feodosiy Yuryevich Efremenkov (Russian: Феодосий Юрьевич Ефременков; born 19 March 1996) is a Russian former competitive figure skater. He was born in Klin, and is the 2012 Winter Youth Olympics bronze medalist.

== Programs ==
Season	Short program	Free skating
2011–2012	Quixote by Bond	Sinbad: Legend of the Seven Seas by Harry Gregson-Williams

== Competitive highlights ==
JGP: Junior Grand Prix

International
Event	08–09	09–10	10–11	11–12	12–13
Youth Olympics				3rd	
JGP Austria					9th
JGP Latvia				11th	
NRW Trophy					2nd J.
National
Russian Champ.			16th	15th	17th
Russian Jr. Champ.	17th	11th	13th	4th	10th
Team events
Youth Olympics				5th T (1st P)	
J. = Junior level
