= Yuri Hulitski =

Belarusian ice dancer

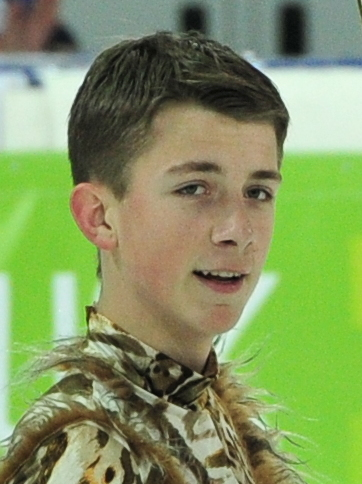
- Hulitski at the 2012 Winter Youth Olympics

Personal information
- Native name: Юрый Чэслававіч Гуліцкі (Belarusian)
- Full name: Yuri Cheslavavich Hulitski
- Other names: Gulitski/Gulicki
- Born: 18 April 1996 (age 30) Minsk, Belarus
- Height: 1.83 m (6 ft 0 in)

Figure skating career
- Country: Belarus
- Coach: Alexander Zhulin, Alexei Sitnikov, Tatiana Beliaeva
- Skating club: RCOP Minsk
- Began skating: 2000
- Retired: July 23, 2020

Yuri Cheslavavich Hulitski (Belarusian: Юрый Чэслававіч Гуліцкі; born 18 April 1996) is a retired Belarusian competitive ice dancer. With Anna Kublikova, he is the 2018 Open d'Andorra silver medalist and the 2019 Belarusian national champion. He has competed in the final segment at three ISU Championships.

== Career ==
Hulitski began learning to skate in 2000. He competed at least five seasons with Eugenia Tkachenka. At the 2012 Winter Youth Olympics, the two placed 10th in the individual ice dancing event and won gold in the team event. At the 2015 World Junior Championships in Tallinn, Estonia, they qualified to the free dance and finished 17th overall.

Hulitski and Russia's Maria Oleynik made their international debut in August 2015. Their final event together was the 2016 World Junior Championships, held in March in Debrecen, Hungary. They placed 16th in the short dance, 18th in the free dance, and 17th overall.

Hulitski and Kristsina Kaunatskaia from Belarus debuted their partnership in September 2016, at the ISU Junior Grand Prix in Japan. After another JGP event, in Germany, they switched to the senior ranks, taking silver at the Belarusian Championships in December. In February, they placed 14th at the 2017 Winter Universiade, their final competition together.

Hulitski then teamed up with Russia's Anna Kublikova. Making their international debut, they placed 12th at the 2017 CS Minsk-Arena Ice Star in October. In December 2018, they took silver at the Open d'Andorra. In January, they competed at the 2019 European Championships in Minsk, Belarus. They qualified to the free dance and finished 18th overall. They placed 22nd at the 2019 World Championships in Saitama, Japan.

In August 2019, the pair split as Kublikova retired.

== Programs ==
=== With Kaunatskaia ===
Season	Short dance	Free dance
2016–2017	Blues: Innuendo; Swing: Crazy Little Thing Called Love by Queen	Mgzavrbi Tango

=== With Oleynik ===
Season	Short dance	Free dance
2015–2016	Waltz: Until... by Sting; Foxtrot: Miss Kiss Kiss Bang by Alex Swings Oscar Sings	Mozart, l'opéra rock

=== With Tkachenka ===
Season	Short dance	Free dance
2014–2015	Samba: Rolling in the Deep; Rhumba: Set Fire to the Rain; Samba: Rolling in the Deep by Adele	The Great Gatsby
2013–14	Quickstep: La Vie en rose	
2011–2012	Cha Cha: A Night Like This by Caro Emerald; Samba: Selection by Black Eyed Peas	Cats by Andrew Lloyd Webber

== Competitive highlights ==
CS: Challenger Series; JGP: Junior Grand Prix

=== With Kublikova ===
International
Event	2017–18	2018–19
World Champ.		22nd
European Champ.		18th
CS Golden Spin	16th	11th
CS Ice Star	12th	
CS Ondrej Nepela		11th
CS Warsaw Cup	11th	
Ice Star		4th
Open d'Andorra		2nd
Open Ice Mall Cup		7th
Toruń Cup		4th
Volvo Open Cup	7th	
National
Belarusian Champ.	2nd	1st

=== With Kaunatskaia ===
International
Event	2016–17
Winter Universiade	14th
International: Junior
JGP Germany	10th
JGP Japan	9th
National
Belarusian Championships	2nd
J = Junior level

=== With Oleynik ===
International
Event	2015–16
World Junior Championships	17th
JGP Latvia	10th
JGP Spain	9th
Ice Star	2nd J
Santa Claus Cup	5th J
Toruń Cup	2nd J
National
Belarusian Championships	1st J
J = Junior level

=== With Tkachenka ===
International
Event	10–11	11–12	12–13	13–14	14–15
Junior Worlds					17th
Youth Olympics		10th			
JGP Belarus				12th	
JGP France					9th
JGP Germany			12th		11th
JGP Latvia		18th			
JGP Poland				13th	
JGP Slovenia			16th		
Ice Star			4th J	7th J	2nd J
Tallinn Trophy					1st J
Toruń Cup				7th J	
Volvo Open Cup			4th J		5th J
National
Belarusian Champ.				2nd J	2nd J
Team events
Youth Olympics		1st T 7th P			
J = Junior level T = Team result; P = Personal result. Medals awarded for team result only.
