= 2024–25 in skiing =

This topic lists the snow ski sports for the 2024–25 season.

== Alpine skiing ==
=== Continental & World Championships/Games ===
- February 4 – 16: FIS Alpine World Ski Championships 2025 in (Austria) Saalbach
- February 8 – 9: 2025 Asian Winter Games in (China) Harbin
- February 25 – March 6: World Junior Alpine Skiing Championships 2025 in (Italy) Tarvisio

=== 2024–25 FIS Alpine Ski World Cup ===
- October 26 – 27: WC #1 in (Austria) Sölden
  - Women's Giant slalom winner: (Italy) Federica Brignone
  - Men's Giant slalom winner: (Norway) Alexander Steen Olsen
- November 16 – 17: WC #2 in (Finland) Levi
  - Women's Slalom winner: (United States) Mikaela Shiffrin
  - Men's Slalom winner: (France) Clément Noël
- November 23 – 24: WC #3 in (Austria) Gurgl
  - Women's Slalom winner: (United States) Mikaela Shiffrin
  - Men's Slalom winner: (France) Clément Noël
- November 30 – December 1: WC #4 in (United States) Killington
  - Women's Giant Slalom winner: (Sweden) Sara Hector
  - Women's Slalom winner: (Switzerland) Camille Rast
- December 6 – 8: WC #5 in (United States) Beaver Creek
  - Men's Downhill winner: (Switzerland) Justin Murisier
  - Men's Super-G winner: (Switzerland) Marco Odermatt
  - Men's Giant slalom winner: (Switzerland) Thomas Tumler
- December 7 – 8: WC #6 in (Canada) Tremblant
  - Event was cancelled.
- December 14 – 15: WC #7 in (United States) Beaver Creek
  - Women's Downhill winner: (Austria) Cornelia Hütter
  - Women's Super-G slalom winner: (Italy) Sofia Goggia
- December 14 – 15: WC #8 in (France) Val-d'Isère
  - Men's Giant slalom winner: (Switzerland) Marco Odermatt
  - Men's Slalom winner: (Norway) Henrik Kristoffersen
- December 20 – 21: WC #9 in (Italy) Val Gardena
  - Men's Super-G winner: (Italy) Mattia Casse
  - Men's Downhill winner: (Switzerland) Marco Odermatt
- December 21 – 22: WC #10 in (Switzerland) St. Moritz
  - Women's Super-G winner: (Austria) Cornelia Hütter
  - Second Women's Super-G was cancelled.
- December 22 – 23: WC #11 in (Italy) Alta Badia
  - Men's Giant slalom winner: (Switzerland) Marco Odermatt
  - Men's Slalom winner: (Norway) Timon Haugan
- December 28 – 29: WC #12 in (Italy) Bormio
  - Men's Downhill winner: (Switzerland) Alexis Monney
  - Men's Super-G winner: (Norway) Fredrik Møller
- December 28 – 29: WC #13 in (Austria) Semmering
  - Women's Giant slalom winner: (Italy) Federica Brignone
  - Women's Slalom winner: (Croatia) Zrinka Ljutić
- January 4 – 5: WC #14 in (Slovenia) Kranjska Gora
- January 8: WC #15 in (Italy) Madonna di Campiglio
- January 11 – 12: WC #16 in (Austria) St. Anton
- January 11 – 12: WC #17 in (Switzerland) Adelboden
- January 14: WC #18 in (Austria) Flachau
- January 17 – 19: WC #19 in (Switzerland) Wengen
- January 18 – 19: WC #20 in (Italy) Cortina d'Ampezzo
- January 21: WC #21 in (Italy) Kronplatz
- January 24 – 26: WC #22 in (Austria) Kitzbühel
- January 25 – 26: WC #23 in (Germany) Garmisch-Partenkirchen
- January 28 – 29: WC #24 in (Austria) Schladming
- January 30: WC #25 in (France) Courchevel
- February 2: WC #26 in (Germany) Garmisch-Partenkirchen
- February 22 – 23: WC #27 in (Switzerland) Crans-Montana
- February 22 – 23: WC #28 in (Italy) Sestriere
- February 28 – March 2: WC #29 in (Norway) Kvitfjell
- March 1 – 2: WC #30 in (Slovenia) Kranjska Gora
- March 8 – 9: WC #31 in (Norway) Kvitfjell
- March 8 – 9: WC #32 in (Sweden) Åre ski resort
- March 14 – 15: WC #33 in (Italy) La Thuile
- March 15 – 16: WC #34 in (Norway) Hafjell
- March 22 – 27: WC #35 in (United States) Sun Valley

=== 2024–25 FIS Alpine Skiing Continental Cup ===
==== 2025 FIS Alpine Ski Australia-New Zealand Cup ====
- August 27 – 31: ANC #1 at (New Zealand) Coronet Peak
  - Both men's, and one women's giant slaloms events were cancelled
  - Women's Giant Slalom winner: (New Zealand) Alice Robinson
  - Men's Slalom winners: (Switzerland) Reto Mächler (#1) / (Belgium) Sam Maes (#2)
  - Women's Slalom winners: (New Zealand) Piera Hudson (#1) / (Switzerland) Janine Maechler (#2)
- September 3 – 6: ANC #2 in (Australia) Thredbo
  - Event was cancelled
- Overall winners: (Belgium) Sam Maes (m) / (Switzerland) Janine Maechler (w)

==== 2024–25 FIS Alpine Ski Europa Cup ====
- November 23 – 24: EC #1 in (Finland) Levi
  - Men's Slalom winners: (Italy) Tommaso Saccardi (#1) / (Norway) Oscar Andreas Sandvik (#2)
- December 2 – 3: EC #2 in (Switzerland) Zinal
  - Women's Giant slalom winners: (Austria) Viktoria Bürgler (#1) / (Switzerland) Delphine Darbellay (#2)
- December 5 – 6: EC #3 in (Switzerland) Zinal
  - Men's Giant slalom winners: (Switzerland) Lenz Haechler (2 times)
- December 7 – 8: EC #4 in (Austria) Mayrhofen
  - Women's Giant slalom winner: (Austria) Victoria Olivier
  - Women's Slalom was cancelled.
- December 11 – 13: EC #5 in (Italy) Santa Caterina
  - Men's Downhill winners: (Austria) Felix Hacker (2 times)
  - Men's Super-G winner: (Austria) Vincent Wieser
- December 13 – 14: EC #6 in (Switzerland) St. Moritz
  - Women's Downhill winners: (Austria) Nadine Fest (#1) / (Austria) Carmen Spielberger (#2)
- December 15: EC #7 in (Italy) Val di Fassa
  - Men's Slalom winner: (Sweden) Gustaw Wissting
- December 16: EC #8 in (Italy) Obereggen
  - Men's Slalom winner: (France) Antoine Azzolin
- December 16 – 17: EC #9 in (Switzerland) Zinal
  - Women's Super-G winners: (Italy) Asja Zenere (#1) / (Switzerland) Malorie Blanc (#2)
- December 19 – 20: EC #10 in (France) Valloire
  - Events were cancelled.
- December 19 – 20: EC #11 in (Italy) Ahrntal
  - Women's Slalom winners: (Italy) Marta Rossetti (#1) / (Sweden) Estelle Alphand (#2)
- January 7 – 8: EC #12 in (Switzerland) Les Diablerets
- January 10 – 11: EC #13 in (Switzerland) Wengen
- January 10 – 11: EC #14 in (France) Puy-Saint-Vincent
- January 15 – 17: EC #15 in (Austria) Zauchensee
- January 16 – 17: EC #16 in (Austria) TBC
- January 19: EC #17 in (Germany) Berchtesgaden
- January 19 – 20: EC #18 in (Austria) Zell am See
- January 21 – 22: EC #19 in (Austria) Reiteralm
- January 24 – 25: EC #20 in (Austria) Turnau
- January 29 – 31: EC #21 in (Italy) Tarvisio
- January 30 – February 1: EC #22 in (France) Orcières-Merlette 1850
- February 3 – 4: EC #23 in (Andorra) Soldeu
- February 3 – 4: EC #24 in (Czech Republic) Špindlerův Mlýn
- February 6 – 7: EC #25 in (Spain) Baqueira
- February 9 – 10: EC #26 in (Germany) Oberjoch
- February 12 – 13: EC #27 in (Switzerland) Crans-Montana
- February 13 – 14: EC #28 in (Italy) Bardonecchia
- February 19 – 20: EC #29 in (Italy) Sarntal
- February 21 – 22: EC #30 in (Bosnia and Herzegovina) Bjelasnica
- March 16 – 17: EC #31 in (Norway) Kvitfjell
- March 19 – 20: EC #32 in (Norway) Norefjell
- March 19 – 20: EC #33 in (Norway) Ål
- March 22 – 23: EC #34 in (Norway) Oppdal

==== 2024–25 FIS Alpine Skiing Far East Cup ====
- December 10 – 13: FEC #1 at (China) Wanglong Ski Resort
  - Men's Giant slalom winners: (Norway) Noah Sjøvik Røsjorde (#1) / (Norway) Mikael Oscar Holter (#2)
  - Women's Giant slalom winners: (Japan) Maharu Yokouchi (#1) / (Japan) Miki Ishibashi (#2)
  - Men's Slalom winners: (South Korea) Jung Dong-hyun (2 times)
  - Women's Slalom winners: (Japan) Eren Watanabe (#1) / (Japan) Arata Wakatsuki (#2)
- January 31 – February 7: FEC #2 at (South Korea) Alpensia Resort
- February 3 – 4: FEC #3 at (South Korea) Yongpyong
- February 25 – 28: FEC #4 in (Japan) Sugadairakohgen
- March 5 – 7: FEC #5 in (Japan) Hakuba

==== 2024–25 FIS Alpine Skiing Nor-Am Cup ====
- November 16 – 21: NAC #1 in (United States) Copper Mountain
  - Events were cancelled.
- November 18 – 21: NAC #2 in (United States) Aspen
  - Events were cancelled.
- December 10 – 15: NAC #3 at (Canada) Panorama Resort
  - Men's Super-G winners: (Canada) Brodie Seger (#1) / (Canada) Raphaël Lessard (#2)
  - Women's Super-G winners: (United States) Bobbi Jo Griffin (#1) / (United States) Dasha Romanov (#2)
  - Men's Giant slalom winners: (Canada) Liam Wallace (#1) / (United States) Isaiah Nelson (#2)
  - Women's Slalom winners: (Canada) Amelia Smart (2 times)
  - Men's Slalom winners: (United States) Stanley Buzek (#1) / (Canada) Jesse Kertesz-Knight (#2)
  - Women's Giant slalom winners: (Australia) Madison Hoffman (#1) / (Sweden) Hanna Aronsson Elfman (#2)
- January 27 – 30: NAC #4 in (Canada) Lake Louise
- January 27 – 30: NAC #5 in (Canada) Norquay
- February 3 – 6: NAC #6 in (Canada) Kimberley
- March 10 – 20: NAC #7 in (United States) Sugarloaf
- March 17 – 20: NAC #8 at (United States) Burke Mountain

==== 2024–25 FIS Alpine Skiing South American Cup ====
- August 4 – 5: SAC #1 at (Argentina) Chapelco
  - Men's Giant Slalom winners: (Italy) Gian Maria Illariuzzi (#1) / (Argentina) Tiziano Gravier (#2)
  - Women's Giant Slalom winners: (United Kingdom) Giselle Gorringe (#1) / (Switzerland) Lindy Etzensperger (#2)
- August 8 – 11: SAC #2 at (Argentina) Cerro Catedral
  - Men's Slalom winners: (France) Jérémie Lagier (#1) / (Hungary) Richard Leitgeb (#2)
  - Women's Slalom winners: (United Kingdom) Giselle Gorringe (#1) / (Argentina) Francesca Baruzzi (#2)
  - Giant Slalom winners: (Argentina) Tiziano Gravier (m) / (Argentina) Francesca Baruzzi (w)
- August 31: SAC #3 at (Chile) El Colorado
  - Giant Slalom winners: (Argentina) Tiziano Gravier (m) / (Sweden) Estelle Alphand (w)
- September 1: SAC #4 in (Chile) La Parva
  - Slalom winners: (France) Thomas Lardon (m) / (Andorra) Carla Mijares Ruf (w)
- September 4 – 5: SAC #5 in (Chile) La Parva
  - Men's Downhill winners: (Austria) Lukas Feurstein (2 times)
  - Women's Downhill winners: (United States) Haley Cutler (#1) / (United States) Bobbi Jo Griffin (#2)
  - Men's Super G winners: (Czech Republic) Jan Zabystřan (#1) / (Germany) Felix Roesle (#2)
  - Women's Super G winners: (Andorra) Jordina Caminal Santure (#1) / (United States) Haley Cutler (#2)
- September 10 – 13: SAC #6 at (Argentina) Cerro Castor
  - Men's Giant Slalom winners: (Italy) Luca De Aliprandini (#1) / (Austria) Patrick Feurstein (#2)
  - Women's Giant Slalom winners: (Italy) Asja Zenere (#1) / (Argentina) Francesca Baruzzi (#2)
  - Men's Slalom winners: (Spain) Juan del Campo (#1) / (France) Victor Muffat-Jeandet (#2)
  - Women's Slalom winners: (Italy) Martina Peterlini (#1) / (Argentina) Francesca Baruzzi (#2)
- September 25 – 27: SAC #7 at (Chile) Corralco
  - Men's Downhill winners: (Italy) Mattia Cason (2 times)
  - Women's Downhill winners: (Czech Republic) Tereza Nová (2 times)
  - Men's Super G winners: (Finland) Jaakko Tapanainen (#1) / (United States) Tristan Lane (#2)
  - Women's Super G winners: (United Kingdom) Giselle Gorringe (#1) / (Andorra) Jordina Caminal (#2)
- March 29 – 30: SAC #8 at (Kosovo) Brezovica

== Biathlon ==
=== Continental & World Championships/Games ===
- August 22 – 25, 2024: Summer Biathlon World Championships 2024 in (Estonia) Otepää
  - 7.5 km Super Sprint winners: (Ukraine) Dmytro Pidruchnyi (m) / (Slovakia) Paulína Bátovská Fialková (w)
  - 7.5/6 km Sprint winners: (Czech Republic) Jakub Štvrtecký (m) / (Czech Republic) Tereza Voborníková (w)
  - Gala Mass Start winners: (Estonia) Rene Zahkna (m) / (Latvia) Baiba Bendika (w)
- January 22 – 26: 2025 IBU Junior Open European Championships in (Germany) Altenberg
- January 29 – February 2: 2025 IBU Open European Championships in (Italy) Martell
- February 11 – 14: 2025 Asian Winter Games in (China) Harbin
- February 12 – 23: Biathlon World Championships 2025 in (Switzerland) Lenzerheide
- February 26 – March 5: Biathlon Junior World Championships 2025 in (Sweden) Östersund

=== 2024–25 Biathlon World Cup ===
- November 30 – December 8: WC #1 in (Finland) Kontiolahti
  - Short individual winners: (Norway) Endre Strømsheim (m) / (France) Lou Jeanmonnot (f)
  - Sprint winners: (France) Émilien Jacquelin (m) / (Czech Republic) Markéta Davidová (f)
  - Mass start winners: (France) Éric Perrot (m) / (Sweden) Elvira Öberg (f)
  - Relay winners: France (m) / Sweden (f)
  - Mixed relay winners: Sweden (6 km + 7.5 km) / Norway (4 x 6 km)
- December 13 – 15: WC #2 in (Austria) Hochfilzen
  - Sprint winners: (Norway) Johannes Thingnes Bø (m) / (Germany) Franziska Preuß (f)
  - Pursuit winners: (Norway) Johannes Thingnes Bø (m) / (France) Lou Jeanmonnot (f)
  - Relay winners: France (m) / Germany (f)
- December 19 – 22: WC #3 in (France) Annecy–Le Grand-Bornand
  - Sprint winners: (Norway) Martin Uldal (m) / (France) Justine Braisaz-Bouchet (f)
  - Pursuit winners: (Norway) Johannes Thingnes Bø (m) / (Germany) Franziska Preuß (f)
  - Mass start winners: (Norway) Tarjei Bø (m) / (Germany) Selina Grotian (f)
- January 9 – 12: WC #4 in (Germany) Oberhof
- January 15 – 19: WC #5 in (Germany) Ruhpolding
- January 23 – 26: WC #6 in (Italy) Antholz-Anterselva
- March 6 – 9: WC #7 in (Czech Republic) Nové Město na Moravě
- March 13 – 16: WC #8 in (Slovenia) Pokljuka
- March 21 – 23: WC #9 in (Norway) Oslo Holmenkollen

=== 2024–25 Biathlon IBU Cup ===
- November 28 – December 1: IC #1 in (Sweden) Idre Fjäll
  - Sprint #1 winners: (Norway) Sverre Dahlen Aspenes (m) / (France) Paula Botet (f)
  - Sprint #2 winners: (Norway) Isak Frey (m) / (Norway) Ida Lien (f)
  - Pursuit winners: (Norway) Isak Frey (m) / (Norway) Ida Lien (f)
- December 4 – 7: IC #2 in (Norway) Sjusjøen
  - Individual winners: (Norway) Isak Frey (m) / (France) Camille Bened (f)
  - Sprint winners: (Norway) Martin Uldal (m) / (France) Paula Botet (f)
  - Pursuit winners: (Norway) Martin Uldal (m) / (Germany) Marlene Fichtner (f)
- December 19 – 22: IC #3 in (Austria) Obertilliach
  - Sprint winners: (Norway) Johannes Dale-Skjevdal (m) / (Italy) Ilaria Scattolo (f)
  - Mass start winners: (Norway) Johan-Olav Botn (m) / (Germany) Stefanie Scherer (f)
- January 9 – 12: IC #4 in (Germany) Arber
- January 15 – 18: IC #5 in (Slovakia) Brezno Osrblie
- February 5 – 8: IC #6 in (Italy) Ridnaun-Val Ridanna
- March 6 – 9: IC #7 in (Estonia) Otepää
- March 12 – 15: IC #8 in (Estonia) Otepää

=== 2024–25 Biathlon IBU Junior Cup ===
- December 12 – 15: IJC #1 in (Italy) Ridnaun-Val Ridanna
  - Individual winners: (Germany) Linus Kesper (m) / (Germany) Charlotte Gallbronner (f)
  - Sprint #1 winners: (Germany) Elias Seidl (m) / (France) Violette Bony (f)
  - Sprint #2 winners: (Czech Republic) David Eliáš (m) / (Italy) Carlotta Gautero (f)
- December 18 – 21: IJC #2 in (Switzerland) Goms
  - Sprint winners: (Croatia) Matija Legović (m) / (France) Anaëlle Bondoux (f)
  - Mass start winners: (Italy) Felix Ratschiller (m) / (France) Anaëlle Bondoux (f)
  - Mixed relay winners: France (4 x 6 km) / France (6 km + 7.5 km)
- January 16 – 19: IJC #3 in (Poland) Jakuszyce

== Cross-country skiing ==
=== Continental & World Championships/Games ===
- February 3 – 9: 2025 Nordic Junior World Ski Championships in (Italy) Schilpario
- February 8 – 13: 2025 Asian Winter Games in (China) Harbin
- February 26 – March 9: FIS Nordic World Ski Championships 2025 in (Norway) Trondheim

=== 2024–25 FIS Cross-Country World Cup ===
- November 29 – December 1: WC #1 in (Finland) Ruka
  - 10 km C winners: (Finland) Iivo Niskanen (m) / (Sweden) Frida Karlsson (w)
  - Sprint C winners: (Norway) Johannes Høsflot Klæbo (m) / (Sweden) Johanna Hagström (w)
  - 20 km F MSS winners: (Norway) Harald Østberg Amundsen (m) / (United States) Jessie Diggins (w)
- December 6 – 8: WC #2 in (Norway) Lillehammer
  - 10 km F winners: (Norway) Martin Løwstrøm Nyenget (m) / (Norway) Therese Johaug (w)
  - Sprint F winners: (Norway) Johannes Høsflot Klæbo (m) / (Sweden) Jonna Sundling (w)
  - 20 km skiathlon winners: (Norway) Harald Østberg Amundsen (m) / (Norway) Therese Johaug (w)
- December 13 – 15: WC #3 in (Switzerland) Davos
  - Sprint F winners: (Norway) Johannes Høsflot Klæbo (m) / (Sweden) Jonna Sundling (w)
  - 20 km C winners: (Norway) Martin Løwstrøm Nyenget (m) / (Norway) Astrid Øyre Slind (w)
- December 28 – January 1: WC #4 in (Italy) Toblach
  - Sprint F winners: (Norway) Johannes Høsflot Klæbo (m) / (United States) Jessie Diggins (w)
  - 15 km C MSS winners: (Norway) Johannes Høsflot Klæbo (m) / (United States) Jessie Diggins (w)
  - 20 km F winners: (Norway) Harald Østberg Amundsen (m)
- January 3 – 5: WC #5 in (Italy) Val di Fiemme
- January 17 – 19: WC #6 in (France) Les Rousses
- January 24 – 26: WC #7 in (Switzerland) Engadin
- January 31 – February 2: WC #8 in (Czech Republic) Nové Město
- February 14 – 16: WC #9 in (Sweden) Falun
- March 15 – 16: WC #10 in (Norway) Oslo
- March 19: WC #11 in (Estonia) Tallinn
- March 21 – 23: WC #12 in (Finland) Lahti

=== 2024–25 FIS Cross-Country Continental Cup ===
==== 2024–25 FIS Cross-Country Australia/New Zealand Cup ====
- July 27 – 28: ANC #1 at (Australia) Falls Creek
  - Sprint C winners: (Australia) Jayden Spring (m) / (Australia) Rosie Fordham (w)
  - 15 km Individual F winners: (Australia) Phillip Bellingham (m) / (Australia) Rosie Fordham (w)
- August 17 – 18: ANC #2 at (Australia) Perisher
  - Sprint F winners: (Germany) Christian Winker (m) / (Australia) Rosie Fordham (w)
  - 10 km F winners: (Germany) Christian Winker (m) / (Australia) Rosie Fordham (w)
- Overall winners: (Australia) Phillip Bellingham (m) / (Australia) Rosie Fordham (w)

==== 2024–25 FIS Cross-Country Balkan Cup ====
- January 11 – 12: BC #1 in (North Macedonia) Mavrovo
- January 18 – 19: BC #2 in (Serbia) Zlatibor
- January 25 – 26: BC #3 in (Croatia) Ravna Gora
- February 1 – 2: BC #4 in (Greece) Metsovo
- February 19 – 20: BC #5 in (Bosnia and Herzegovina) Dvorišta–Pale
- March 15 – 16: BC #6 in (Bulgaria) Bansko
- March 22 – 23: BC #7 in (Romania) Fundata

==== 2024–25 FIS Cross-Country Eastern Europe Cup ====
- November 21 – 23: EEC #1 in (Kazakhstan) Shchuchinsk
  - Sprint C winners: (Kazakhstan) Svyatoslav Matassov (m) / (Kazakhstan) Tamara Ebel (f)
  - 10 km C winners: (Kazakhstan) Vitaliy Pukhkalo (m) / (Kazakhstan) Tamara Ebel (f)
  - 10 km F winners: (Kazakhstan) Vitaliy Pukhkalo (m) / (Kazakhstan) Laura Kinybaeyeva (f)
- December 21 – 24: EEC #2 in (Kazakhstan) Shchuchinsk
  - Sprint C winners: (Kazakhstan) Konstantin Bortsov (m) / (Kazakhstan) Nadezhda Stepashkina (f)
  - 20 km C MSS winners: (Kazakhstan) Vladislav Kovalyov (m) / (Kazakhstan) Kseniya Shalygina (f)
  - 10 km F winners: (Kazakhstan) Vitaliy Pukhkalo (m) / (Kazakhstan) Nadezhda Stepashkina (f)
- January 16 – 20: EEC #3 in (Kazakhstan) Shchuchinsk

==== 2024–25 FIS Cross-Country Far East Cup ====
- December 16 – 17: FEC #1 in (South Korea) Alpensia
  - Men's 10 km C winner: (Japan) Takatsugu Uda
  - Women's 5 km C winner: (Japan) Hikari Miyazaki
  - Men's 10 km F winner: (Japan) Daito Yamazaki
  - Women's 5 km F winner: (South Korea) Han Da-som
- December 25 – 27: FEC #2 in (Japan) Otoineppu
  - 10 km C winners: (Japan) Takatsugu Uda (m) / (Japan) Masae Tsuchiya (f)
  - 10 km F winners: (Japan) Takatsugu Uda (m) / (Japan) Masae Tsuchiya (f)
- January 11: FEC #3 in (Japan) Sapporo Shirahatayama
- January 12: FEC #4 in (Japan) Sapporo Shirahatayama
- January 13: FEC #5 in (Japan) Sapporo Shirahatayama
- January 24 – 25: FEC #6 in (South Korea) Alpensia
- February 7 – 9: FEC #7 in (Japan) Shiramine
- February 27 – March 2: FEC #8 in (Japan) Sapporo Shirahatayama

==== 2024–25 FIS Cross-Country FESA Cup ====
- December 6 – 8: FESA #1 in (Italy) Schlinig
  - Sprint F winners: (Italy) Giovanni Ticco (m) / (Italy) Federica Cassol (f)
  - 10 km C winners: (France) Sabin Coupat (m) / (Andorra) Gina Del Rio (f)
  - Men's 15 km F winner: (France) Clément Parisse
  - Women's 10 km F winner: (Italy) Maria Gismondi
- December 21 – 22: FESA #2 in (Austria) Sankt Ulrich am Pillersee
  - Sprint C winners: (Italy) Simone Mocellini (m) / (Germany) Verena Veit (f)
  - 10 km F winners: (Italy) Lorenzo Romano (m) / (Germany) Anna-Maria Dietze (f)
- January 4 – 5: FESA #3 in (Germany) Sparkassen-Skiarena Oberwiesenthal
- January 17 – 19: FESA #4 in (Italy) Falcade
- March 8 – 9: FESA #5 in (Slovenia) Planica
- March 14 – 16: FESA #6 in (France) Prémanon

==== 2024–25 FIS Cross-Country Scandinavian Cup ====
- December 13 – 15: SC #1 in (Norway) Lillehammer
  - Sprint C winners: (Norway) Ansgar Evensen (m) / (Finland) Amanda Saari (f)
  - 20 km C MSS winners: (Norway) Mattis Stenshagen (m) / (Norway) Helene Marie Fossesholm (f)
  - 10 km F winners: (Norway) Iver Tildheim Andersen (m) / (United States) Sophia Laukli (f)
- January 3 – 5: SC #2 in (Sweden) Gällivare
- February 28 – March 2: SC #3 in (Latvia) Madona

==== 2024–25 FIS Cross-Country Slavic Cup ====
- December 14 – 15: SC #1 in (Slovakia) Štrbské pleso
  - Sprint C winners: (Poland) Kamil Bury (m) / (Poland) Monika Skinder (f)
  - 10 km F winners: (Poland) Dominik Bury (m) / (Poland) Andżelika Szyszka (f)
- March 8 – 9: SC #2 in (Slovakia) Kremnica–Skalka

==== 2024–25 FIS Cross-Country South American Cup ====
- August 31 – September 2: SAC #1 at (Argentina) Cerro Catedral
  - Sprint C winners: (Argentina) Franco Dal Farra (m) / (Argentina) Maira Sofia Fernandez Righi (w)
  - 10 km/5 km F winners: (Argentina) Franco Dal Farra (m) / (Argentina) Nahiara Díaz González (w)
  - 10 km/5 km C events were cancelled
- September 11 – 12: SAC #2 (Chile) Corralco
  - 10 km/7.5 km F winners: (Argentina) Franco Dal Farra (m) / (Argentina) Agustina Groetzner (w)
  - 1.3 km Sprint F winners: (Argentina) Franco Dal Farra (m) / (Argentina) Nahiara Díaz González (w)

==== 2024–25 FIS Cross-Country US Super Tour ====
- December 12 – 17: UST #1 in (United States) Cable
  - Sprint F winners: (United States) Luke Jager (m) / (United States) Anabel Needham (f)
  - Sprint C winners: (United States) Graham Houtsma (m) / (Sweden) Erica Laven (f)
  - 10 km F winners: (United States) John Steel Hagenbuch (m) / (Sweden) Erica Laven (f)
  - 20 km C MSS winners: (United States) Luke Jager (m) / (Sweden) Erica Laven (f)
- January 2 – 7: UST #2 in (United States) Kincaid
- January 24 – 26: UST #3 in (United States) Bozeman
- February 22: UST #4 in (United States) Cable–Hayward
- March 26 – 30: UST #5 in (United States) Lake Placid

== Grass skiing ==
=== World Championships ===
- July 24 – 27: FIS Grass Skiing Junior World Championships 2023/2024 in (Czech Republic) Orlické Záhoří
  - Slalom winners: (Italy) Andrea Iori (m) / (Czech Republic) Eliška Rejchrtová (w)
  - Giant Slalom winners: (Italy) Andrea Iori (m) / (Austria) Emma Eberhardt (w)
  - Super G winners: (Italy) Andrea Iori (m) / (Italy) Nicole Mastalli (w)
  - Super Combined winners: (Italy) Andrea Iori (m) / (Czech Republic) Eliška Rejchrtová (w)

=== 2024–25 FIS Grass Skiing World Cup ===
- June 8: WC #1 in (Sweden) Vrinnevibacken Norrköping
  - Slalom winners: (Czech Republic) Martin Barták (m) / (Austria) Emma Eberhardt (w)
- June 28 – 30: WC #2 in (Czech Republic) Předklášteří
  - Slalom winners: (Italy) Lorenzo Dante Marco Gritti (m) / (Czech Republic) Eliška Rejchrtová (w)
  - Men's Giant Slalom winners: (Italy) Andrea Iori (#1) / (Czech Republic) Martin Barták (#2)
  - Women's Giant Slalom winners: (Czech Republic) Eliška Rejchrtová (#1) / (Austria) Lara Teynor (#2)
- August 24 – 25: WC #3 in (Italy) Tambre
  - Men's Super G winners: (Czech Republic) Aleš Knor (#1) / (Italy) Andrea Iori (#2)
  - Women's Super G winners: (Czech Republic) Eliška Rejchrtová (#1) / (Czech Republic) Šárka Abrahamová (#2)
- September 6 – 8: WC #4 in (Austria) Rettenbach
  - Super G winners: (Italy) Lorenzo Dante Marco Gritti (m) / (Czech Republic) Šárka Abrahamová (w)
  - Giant Slalom winners: Lorenzo Dante Marco Gritti (m) / (Austria) Lara Teynor (w)
  - Slalom winners: (Switzerland) Mirko Hueppi (m) / (Austria) Lara Teynor (w)
- Overall winners: (Italy) Andrea Iori (m) / (Czech Republic) Eliška Rejchrtová (w)

=== 2024–25 FIS Grass Skiing Junior Cup ===
- May 24 – 26: JUC #1 in (Germany) Neudorf
  - Slalom winners: (Italy) Andrea Iori (m) / (Czech Republic) Eliška Rejchrtová (w)
  - Giant Slalom winners: (Italy) Andrea Iori (m) / (Austria) Lara Teynor (w)
  - Super G winners: (Czech Republic) Aleš Knor (m) / (Czech Republic) Eliška Rejchrtová (w)
- June 7 – 9: JUC #2 in (Sweden) Vrinnevibacken Norrköping
  - Men's Slalom winners: (Italy) Nathan Seganti (#1) / (Italy) Andrea Iori (#2)
  - Women's Slalom winners: (Austria) Lara Teynor (2 times)
- June 14 – 16: JUC #3 in (Austria) Schwarzenbach
  - Slalom winners: (Italy) Andrea Iori (m) / (Austria) Lara Teynor (w)
  - Giant Slalom winners: (Italy) Andrea Iori (m) / (Austria) Lara Teynor (w)
  - Super G winners: (Italy) Andrea Iori (m) / (Austria) Emma Eberhardt (w)
- July 6 – 7: JUC #4 in (Slovakia) Jasenská Dolina
  - Slalom winners: (Italy) Alex Galler (m) / (Austria) Emma Eberhardt (w)
  - Giant Slalom winners: (Italy) Andrea Iori (m) / (Austria) Emma Eberhardt (w)
- August 24 – 25: JUC #5 in (Italy) Tambre
  - Super G winners: (Czech Republic) Aleš Knor (m) / (Czech Republic) Aneta Koryntová (w)
- August 31 – September 1: JUC #6 in (Italy) Pellegrino Parmense
  - Giant Slalom winners: (Italy) Andrea Iori (m) / (Austria) Emma Eberhardt (w)
  - Slalom winners: (Austria) Valentin Lemp-Pfannenstill (m) / (Austria) Lara Teynor (w)
- September 13 – 15: JUC #7 in (Italy) Sauris
  - Giant Slalom winners: (Italy) Andrea Iori (m) / (Austria) Lara Teynor (w)
  - Slalom winners: (Italy) Nathan Seganti (m) / (Austria) Emma Eberhardt (w)
  - Super G winners: (Czech Republic) Aleš Knor (m) / (Czech Republic) Eliška Rejchrtová (w)
- Overall winners: (Italy) Andrea Iori (m) / (Austria) Lara Teynor (w)

== Freestyle skiing ==
=== Continental & World Championships/Games ===
- January 7 – 11: 2025 FIS Freestyle Ski and Snowboarding Junior World Championships in (Kazakhstan) Almaty
- February 7 – 13: 2025 Asian Winter Games in (China) Harbin
- March 16 – 30: FIS Freestyle Ski and Snowboarding World Championships 2025 in (Switzerland) Engadin

=== 2024–25 FIS Freestyle Ski World Cup ===
- September 9: WC #1 in (New Zealand) Cardrona
  - Freeski Halfpipe winners: (Canada) Brendan Mackay (m) / (China) Eileen Gu (w)
- October 18: WC #2 in (Switzerland) Chur
  - Freeski Big Air winners: (Austria) Matěj Švancer (m) / (Switzerland) Mathilde Gremaud (w)
- November 22 – 23: WC #3 in (Austria) Stubai
  - Freeski Slopestyle winners: (United States) Colby Stevenson (m) / (France) Tess Ledeux (w)
- November 29 – December 1: WC #4 in (China) Beijing
  - Freeski Big Air winners: (Norway) Tormod Frostad (m) / (France) Tess Ledeux (w)
- November 30: WC #5 in (Finland) Ruka
  - Moguls winners: (Canada) Mikaël Kingsbury (m) / (France) Perrine Laffont (w)
- December 5 – 7: WC #6 in (China) Secret Garden
  - Freeski Halfpipe winners: (United States) Nick Goepper (m) / (China) Eileen Gu (w)
- December 6 – 7: WC #7 in (Sweden) Idre Fjäll
  - Moguls winners: (Canada) Mikaël Kingsbury (m) / (Australia) Jakara Anthony (w)
  - Dual Moguls events were cancelled.
- December 10 – 14: WC #8 in (France) Val Thorens
  - Skicross #1 winners: (Italy) Simone Deromedis (m) / (Canada) Marielle Thompson (w)
  - Skicross #2 winners: (Switzerland) Alex Fiva (m) / (Canada) India Sherret (w)
- December 13 – 14: WC #9 in (France) Alpe d'Huez
  - Events were cancelled.
- December 16 – 17: WC #10 in (Switzerland) Arosa
  - Skicross winners: (Canada) Reece Howden (m) / (Canada) Marielle Thompson (w)
- December 19 – 21: WC #11 in (Italy) Innichen
  - Skicross #1 winners: (Germany) Florian Wilmsmann (m) / (Germany) Daniela Maier (w)
  - Skicross #2 winners: (Canada) Reece Howden (m) / (Germany) Daniela Maier (w)
- December 19 – 21: WC #12 in (United States) Copper
  - Freeski Halfpipe winners: (United States) Alex Ferreira (m) / (China) Eileen Gu (w)
- December 20 – 21: WC #13 in (Georgia (country)) Bakuriani
  - Moguls winners: (France) Benjamin Cavet (m) / (United States) Olivia Giaccio (w)
  - Dual Moguls winners: (Sweden) Walter Wallberg (m) / (United States) Jaelin Kauf (w)
- January 3 – 4: WC #14 in (Austria) Klagenfurt
- January 9 – 10: WC #15 in (Austria) Kreischberg
- January 14 – 17: WC #16 in (Austria) Reiteralm
- January 14 – 17: WC #17 in (Switzerland) Laax
- January 18 – 19: WC #18 in (United States) Lake Placid
- January 21 – 24: WC #19 in (Italy) Alleghe
- January 24 – 25: WC #20 in (United States) Waterville
- January 25 – 26: WC #21 in (Canada) Lac-Beauport
- January 30 – February 2: WC #22 in (Switzerland) Veysonnaz
- January 30 – February 6: WC #23 in (United States) Aspen
- January 31 – February 1: WC #24 in (Canada) Val Saint-Côme
- February 6 – 8: WC #25 in (United States) Deer Valley
- February 6 – 9: WC #26 in (Italy) San Pellegrino
- February 14 – 16: WC #27 in (Canada) Calgary
- February 20 – 22: WC #28 in (Canada) Stoneham
- February 21 – 24: WC #29 in (China) Beidahu
- February 28 – March 2: WC #30 in (Kazakhstan) Almaty
- February 28 – March 2: WC #31 in (Georgia (country)) Gudauri
- March 6 – 7: WC #32 in (Italy) Livigno
- March 11 – 13: WC #33 in (Italy) Livigno
- March 11 – 14: WC #34 in (France) Tignes
- March 12 – 15: WC #35 in (Canada) Craigleith
- March 28 – 30: WC #36 in (Sweden) Idre Fjäll

=== 2024–25 FIS Freestyle skiing Continental Cup ===
==== 2024–25 FIS Freestyle skiing Asian Cup ====
- January 7: AC #1 in (China) Beida Lake Ski Resort
- February 13 – 14: AC #2 in (South Korea) O2 Resort
- February 17: AC #3 in (South Korea) Phoenix Pyeongchang
- February 23 – 24: AC #4 in (Japan) Oze-Tokura
- February 24 – 25: AC #5 in (Japan) Oze-Tokura
- March 1 – 2: AC #6 in (Japan) Sapporo Bankei
- March 7 – 9: AC #7 at (Japan) Taira Ski Resort

==== 2024–25 FIS Freestyle skiing Australian and New Zealand Cup ====
- August 14 – 16: ANC #1 at (Australia) Hotham
  - Men's Ski Cross winners: (Australia) Liam Michael (2 times)
  - Women's Ski Cross winners: (China) Li Wenwen (2 times)
  - Ski Cross #3 was cancelled
- August 17 – 18: ANC #2 at (New Zealand) The Remarkables
  - Slopestyle winners: (Australia) Kai Martin (m) / (China) Han Linshan (w)
- August 27 – 28: ANC #3 at (Australia) Perisher
  - Men's Moguls winners: (Japan) Ikkei Fujimura (2 times)
  - Women's Moguls winners: (Japan) Haruka Ihara (#1) / (Australia) Charlotte Wilson (#2)
- August 31: ANC #4 at (Australia) Mount Buller
  - Event was cancelled
- September 5: ANC #5 in (New Zealand) Cardrona
  - Slopestyle winners: (Italy) Miro Tabanelli (m) / (Italy) Flora Tabanelli (w)
- September 30 – October 2: ANC #6 in (New Zealand) Cardrona
  - Big Air winners: (New Zealand) Lucas Ball (m) / (New Zealand) Madeleine Disbrowe (w)
  - Halfpipe winners: (New Zealand) Finley Melville Ives (m) / (Australia) Indra Brown (w)
  - Slopestyle was cancelled

==== 2024–25 FIS Freestyle skiing European Cup ====
- December 4 – 6: EC #1 in (Netherlands) The Hague
  - Freeski Rail winners: (Netherlands) Mats Bjørndal (m) / (Spain) María Esteban Una (w)
- December 13 – 14: EC #2 in (Finland) Ruka
  - Aerials #1 winners: (Switzerland) Noé Roth (m) / (Australia) Laura Peel (w)
  - Aerials #2 winners: (Canada) Alexandre Duchaine (m) / (Australia) Laura Peel (w)
- December 17 – 18: EC #3 in (Sweden) Idre Fjäll
  - Ski cross #1 winners: (Germany) Kilian Himmelsbach (m) / (Germany) Leonie Bachl-Staudinger (w)
  - Ski cross #2 event was cancelled.
- December 20 – 21: EC #4 in (Switzerland) Airolo
  - Events were cancelled.
- January 8 – 9: EC #5 in (Italy) Prato Nevoso
- January 16 – 19: EC #6 in (Switzerland) Lenk
- January 17 – 18: EC #7 in (Italy) Seiser Alm
- January 21 – 24: EC #8 in (France) Font Romeu
- January 24 – 25: EC #9 in (Austria) Reiteralm
- January 25 – 26: EC #10 in (Sweden) Duved
- January 30 – 31: EC #11 in (Czech Republic) Deštné v Orlických horách
  - Events were cancelled.
- February 1 – 2: EC #12 in (Germany) Grasgehren
- February 1 – 2: EC #13 in (Finland) Jyväskylä
- February 3 – 6: EC #14 in (France) La Clusaz
- February 5 – 7: EC #15 in (France) Les Contamines
- February 6 – 7: EC #16 in (Sweden) Stockholm
- February 8 – 9: EC #17 in (Estonia) Munaka
- February 13 – 14: EC #18 in (Switzerland) Davos
- February 15 – 16: EC #19 in (Italy) Val di Fassa
- February 22 – 23: EC #20 in (Poland) Kotelnica
- February 22 – 23: EC #21 in (Austria) Montafon/Golm
- February 28 – March 1: EC #22 in (Slovakia) Donovaly
  - Events were cancelled.
- March 1 – 2: EC #23 in (Czech Republic) Plešivec
- March 6 – 7: EC #24 in (Czech Republic) Bílá
- March 7 – 8: EC #25 in (Italy) Val di Fassa
- March 8: EC #26 in (Poland) Szczyrk
- March 12 – 16: EC #27 in (Switzerland) Laax
- March 18 – 19: EC #28 in (Austria) Reiteralm
- March 20 – 22: EC #29 in (Austria) St. Anton
- April 1: EC #30 in (Austria) Kitzsteinhorn
  - Events were cancelled.
- April 4 – 5: EC #31 in (Norway) Trysil
- April 5 – 6: EC #32 in (Switzerland) Airolo
- April 7 – 13: EC #33 in (Switzerland) Corvatsch

==== 2024–25 FIS Freestyle skiing Nor-Am Cup ====
- December 12 – 15: NAC #1 in (Canada) Nakiska
- January 14 – 15: NAC #2 at (United States) Copper Mountain
- February 9 – 10: NAC #3 in (United States) Aspen
- February 12 – 13: NAC #4 in (United States) Deer Valley
- February 14 – 15: NAC #5 at (United States) Utah Olympic Park
- February 22 – 23: NAC #6 at (Canada) Apex Mountain
- February 22 – 23: NAC #7 in (Canada) Lac-Beauport
- February 27 – March 1: NAC #8 in (Canada) Stoneham-et-Tewkesbury
- March 1 – 2: NAC #9 at (United States) Stratton Mountain Resort
- March 6 – 8: NAC #10 at Canada Olympic Park
- March 7 – 8: NAC #11 in (Canada) Val St. Come
- March 17 – 19: NAC #12 at (United States) Mammoth Mountain
- March 27 – 30: NAC #3 in (Canada) Nakiska

==== 2024–25 FIS Freestyle skiing South American Cup ====
- July 28 – August 2: SAC #1 in (Chile) Valle Nevado
  - Men's Slopestyle winners: (United States) Luke Votaw (2 times)
  - Women's Slopestyle winners: (Chile) Javiera Rojas (2 times)
  - Men's Big Air winners: (Chile) Francisco Salas (#1) / (Argentina) Cristobal Colombo (#2)
  - Women's Big Air winners: (Chile) Javiera Rojas (#1) / (Chile) Dominique Ohaco (#2)
- August 17 – 18: SAC #2 at (Argentina) Cerro Catedral
  - Men's Slopestyle winners: (Japan) Manatsu Sato (2 times)
  - Women's Slopestyle winners: (Japan) Kanon Kondo (#1) / (Chile) Dominique Ohaco (#2)
- September 20 – 22: SAC #3 at (Argentina) Cerro Catedral
  - Event cancelled
- September 29 – 30: SAC #4 in (Chile) Corralco
  - Men's Ski Cross winners: (France) Alexis Jay (#1) / (France) Eliott Piccard (#2)
  - Women's Ski Cross winners: (France) Anouck Errard (#1) / (France) Marielle Berger Sabbatel (#2)

== Nordic combined ==
=== Continental & World Championships/Games ===
- February 11 – 16: 2025 Nordic Junior World Ski Championships in (United States) Lake Placid
- February 26 – March 9: FIS Nordic World Ski Championships 2025 in (Norway) Trondheim

=== 2024–25 FIS Nordic Combined World Cup ===
- November 28 – December 1: WC #1 in (Finland) Ruka
- December 6 – 7: WC #2 in (Norway) Lillehammer
- December 19 – 21: WC #3 in (Austria) Ramsau
- January 17 – 19: WC #4 in (Germany) Schonach
- January 24 – 26: WC #5 in (Japan) Hakuba
- January 30 – February 2: WC #6 in (Austria) Seefeld
- February 6 – 9: WC #7 in (Estonia) Otepää
- March 14 – 16: WC #8 in (Norway) Oslo
- March 21 – 23: WC #9 in (Finland) Lahti

=== 2024–25 FIS Nordic combined Continental Cup ===
- December 13 – 15: COC #1 in (Finland) Ruka
- January 11 – 12: COC #2 in (Germany) Klingenthal
- January 17 – 19: COC #3 in (Austria) Eisenerz
- January 24 – 26: COC #4 in (Germany) Schonach
- January 31 – February 2: COC #5 in (Norway) Lillehammer
- March 15 – 17: COC #6 in (Finland) Lahti

=== 2024–25 FIS Nordic combined Grand Prix ===
- August 24 – 25: GP #1 in (Austria) Tschagguns
  - Team Normal Hill winners: Slovenia I (mixed)
  - Gundersen Normal Hill winners: (Norway) Einar Lurås Oftebro (m) / (Germany) Jenny Nowak (w)
- August 28: GP #2 in (Germany) Oberstdorf
  - Compact Large Hill winners: (Germany) Johannes Rydzek (m) / (Norway) Ida Marie Hagen (w)
- August 31 – September 1: GP #3 in (France) Chaux-Neuve
  - Men's Compact Large Hill cancelled
  - Gundersen Large Hill winners: (Germany) Johannes Rydzek (m) / (Germany) Jenny Nowak (w)
  - Women's Compact Large Hill winner: (Germany) Nathalie Armbruster
- Overall winners: (France) Laurent Muhlethaler (m) / (Germany) Jenny Nowak (w)

=== 2024–25 FIS Nordic combined Alpen Cup ===
- August 17 – 18: FESA #1 in (Germany) Bischofsgrün
  - Event cancelled
- September 7 – 8: FESA #2 in (Austria) Villach
  - Men's Gundersen Normal Hill winners: (Austria) Andreas Gfrerer (2 times)
  - Women's Gundersen Normal Hill winners: (Slovenia) Tia Malovrh (2 times)
- September 28 – 29: FESA #3 in (Czech Republic) Liberec–Ještěd
  - Men's Gundersen Normal Hill winners: (France) Lubin Martin (#1) / (Austria) Andreas Gfrerer (#2)
  - Women's Gundersen Normal Hill winners: (Slovenia) Tia Malovrh (2 times)
- October 18 – 20: FESA #4 in (Slovenia) Velenje
- October 26 – 27: FESA #5 in (Germany) Oberwiesenthal
- December 21 – 22: FESA #6 in (Austria) Seefeld
- January 11 – 12: FESA #7 in (France) Chaux-Neuve
- March 8 – 9: FESA #8 in (Germany) Oberhof

== Roller skiing ==
=== World Championships ===
- September 12 – 15: 2024 FIS Roller Skiing World Championships in (Italy) Ziano di Fiemme
  - 15 km Mass Start F winners: (Latvia) Raimo Vīgants (m) / (Sweden) Linn Sömskar (w)
  - Sprint F winners: (Italy) Emanuele Becchis (m) / (Italy) Alba Mortagna (w)
  - Team Sprint F winners:
  - 15 km Mass Start C winners: (Spain) Imanol Rojo (m) / (Sweden) Linn Sömskar (w)

=== Junior World Championships ===
- September 12 – 15: 2024 FIS Roller Skiing World Championships in (Italy) Ziano di Fiemme
  - 10 km Mass Start F winners: (Sweden) Jonatan Lindberg (m) / (Italy) Anna Maria Ghiddi (w)
  - Sprint F winners: (Mongolia) Khuslen Ariunjargal (m) / (Italy) Anna Maria Ghiddi (w)
  - Team Sprint F winners:
  - 13 km Mass Start C winners: (Germany) Tilman Hartlieb (m) / (Sweden) Mira Göransson (w)

=== 2024–25 FIS Roller Skiing World Cup ===
- July 17 – 21: WC #1 in Madona
  - 15 km/10 km F winners: (Italy) Matteo Tanel (m) / (Sweden) Linn Sömskar (w)
  - Team Sprint C winners: Latvia I (m) / Sweden I (w)
  - Sprint F winners: (Italy) Emanuele Becchis (m) / (Sweden) Linn Sömskar (w)
  - 20 km Mass Start F winners: (Latvia) Raimo Vīgants (m) / (Sweden) Linn Sömskar (w)
- August 14 – 18: WC #2 in (Kazakhstan) Shchuchinsk
  - Sprint F winners: (Italy) Emanuele Becchis (m) / (Sweden) Jackline Lockner (w)
  - Team Sprint F winners: Sweden I (mixed)
  - 10 km C winners: (Italy) Matteo Tanel (m) / (Sweden) Linn Sömskar (w)
  - 20 km/16 km Mass Start F winners: (Latvia) Raimo Vīgants (m) / (Sweden) Linn Sömskar (w)
- Overall winners: (Latvia) Raimo Vīgants (m) / (Sweden) Linn Sömskar (w)

=== 2024–25 FIS Roller Skiing Junior World Cup ===
- July 17 – 21: JWC #1 in (Latvia) Madona
  - 10 km/7.5 km F Winners: (Sweden) Jonathan Lindberg (m) / (Italy) Anna Maria Ghiddi (w)
  - Team Sprint C winners: Sweden (m) / Italy (w)
  - Sprint F winners: (Sweden) Ville Jutterdal (m) / (Latvia) Linda Kaparkalēja (w)
  - 20 km /15 km Mass Start F winners: (Sweden) Jonathan Lindberg (m) / (Sweden) Johanna Holmberg (w)
- August 14 – 18: JWC #2 in Shchuchinsk
  - Sprint F winners: (Italy) Davide Piccinini (m) / (Italy) Anna Maria Ghiddi (w)
  - Team Sprint F winners: Kazakhstan I (mixed)
  - 10 km C winners: (Kazakhstan) Amirgali Muratbekov (m) / (Sweden) Johanna Holmberg (w)
  - 20 km/16 km Mass Start F winners: (Kazakhstan) Amirgali Muratbekov (m) / (Sweden) Johanna Holmberg (w)
- Overall winners: (Italy) Stefano Epis (m) / (Sweden) Johanna Holmberg (w)

== Ski jumping ==
=== Continental & World Championships/Games ===
- February 11 – 16: 2025 Nordic Junior World Ski Championships in (United States) Lake Placid
- February 26 – March 9: FIS Nordic World Ski Championships 2025 in (Norway) Trondheim

=== 2024–25 FIS Ski Jumping World Cup ===
- November 22 – 24: WC #1 in (Norway) Lillehammer
- November 29 – December 1: WC #2 in (Finland) Ruka
- December 6 – 8: WC #3 in (Poland) Wisła
- December 13 – 15: WC #4 in (Germany) Titisee-Neustadt
- December 13 – 15: WC #5 in (China) Zhangjiakou
- December 20 – 22: WC #6 in (Switzerland) Engelberg
- December 28 – 29: WC #7 in (Germany) Oberstdorf
- December 30 – January 1: WC #8 in (Germany) Garmisch-Partenkirchen
- December 31 – January 1: WC #9 in (Germany) Oberstdorf
- January 3 – 4: WC #10 in (Austria) Innsbruck
- January 4 – 6: WC #11 in (Austria) Villach
- January 5 – 6: WC #12 in (Austria) Bischofshofen
- January 17 – 19: WC #13 in (Japan) Sapporo
- January 18 – 19: WC #14 in (Poland) Zakopane
- January 23 – 26: WC #15 in (Japan) Zao
- January 24 – 26: WC #16 in (Germany) Oberstdorf
- January 31 – February 2: WC #17 in (Germany) Willingen
- February 6 – 9: WC #18 in (United States) Lake Placid
- February 14 – 16: WC #19 in (Japan) Sapporo
- February 14 – 16: WC #20 in (Slovenia) Ljubno
- February 21 – 23: WC #21 in (Austria) Hinzenbach
- March 12 – 13: WC #22 in (Norway) Oslo
- March 14 – 16: WC #23 in (Norway) Vikersund
- March 19 – 23: WC #24 in (Finland) Lahti
- March 27 – 30: WC #25 in (Slovenia) Planica

=== 2024–25 FIS Ski Jumping Continental Cup ===
Summer

- August 10 – 11: COC #1 in (Germany) Hinterzarten
  - Normal Hill winners: (Austria) Clemens Aigner (2 times)
- September 14 – 15: COC #2 in (Norway) Trondheim
  - Large Hill winners: (Austria) Manuel Fettner (2 times)
- September 21 – 22: COC #3 in (Austria) Stams
  - Large Hill winners: (Austria) Clemens Aigner (2 times)
- September 28 – 29: COC #4 in (Germany) Klingenthal
  - Large Hill winners: (Norway) Fredrik Villumstad (#1) / (Austria) Manuel Fettner (#2)

Winter

- December 7 – 8: COC #1 in (China) Zhangjiakou
- December 14 – 15: COC #2 in (Finland) Ruka
- December 27 – 28: COC #3 in (Switzerland) Engelberg
- January 11 – 12: COC #4 in (Germany) Klingenthal
- January 18 – 19: COC #5 in (Austria) Bischofshofen
- January 25: COC #6 in (Japan) Sapporo
- January 26: COC #7 in (Japan) Sapporo
- February 1 – 2: COC #8 in (Norway) Lillehammer
- February 22 – 23: COC #9 in (United States) Iron Mountain
- March 8 – 9: COC #10 in (Slovenia) Kranj
- March 15 – 16: COC #11 in (Finland) Lahti
- March 22 – 23: COC #12 in (Poland) Zakopane

=== 2024 FIS Ski Jumping Grand Prix ===
- August 13 – 14: GP #1 in (France) Courchevel
  - Men's Large Hill winners: (Austria) Stefan Kraft (2 times)
  - Women's Large Hill winners: (Slovenia) Ema Klinec (#1) / (Japan) Sara Takanashi (#2)
- September 14 – 15: GP #2 in (Poland) Wisła
  - Men's Large Hill winners: (Norway) Marius Lindvik (2 times)
  - Women's events cancelled
- September 21 – 22: GP #3 in (Romania) Râșnov
  - Men's Normal Hill winners: (Poland) Paweł Wąsek (2 times)
  - Women's Normal Hill winners: (Italy) Lara Malsiner (2 times)
- September 28 – 29: GP #4 in (Austria) Hinzenbach
  - Men's Normal Hill winners: (Austria) Daniel Tschofenig (#1) / (Germany) Andreas Wellinger (#2)
- October 5 – 6: GP #5 in Klingenthal
  - Large Hill winners: (Norway) Marius Lindvik (m) / Katharina Schmid (w) / Germany (mixed team)
- Overall winners: (Poland) Paweł Wąsek (m) / (Italy) Lara Malsiner (w)

=== 2024–25 FIS Ski Jumping Inter-Continental Cup ===
Summer

- August 10 – 11: ICOC #1 in (Germany) Hinterzarten
  - Normal Hill winners: (Germany) Selina Freitag (#1) / (Germany) Katharina Schmid (#2)
- September 14 – 15: ICOC #2 in (Norway) Trondheim
  - Normal Hill winners: (Germany) Katharina Schmid (2 times)
- September 21 – 22: ICOC #3 in (Austria) Stams
  - Large Hill winners: (France) Joséphine Pagnier (2 times)
- September 28 – 29: ICOC #4 in (Switzerland) Einsiedeln
  - Large Hill winners: (Slovenia) Maja Kovacic (#1) / (Switzerland) Sina Arnet (#2)
- October 5 – 6: ICOC #5 in (Estonia) Otepää
  - Normal Hill winners: (Finland) Heta Hirvonen (#1) / (Norway) Ingvild Midtskogen (#2)

Winter

- December 7 – 8: ICOC #1 in (China) Zhangjiakou
- December 13 – 14: ICOC #2 in (Norway) Notodden
- January 4 – 5: ICOC #3 in (Sweden) Falun
- January 17 – 18: ICOC #4 in (Austria) Bischofshofen
- February 8 – 9: ICOC #5 in (Austria) Villach
- March 1 – 2: ICOC #6 in (Germany) Oberhof
- March 14 – 15: ICOC #7 in (Finland) Lahti

=== 2024–25 FIS Cup ===
- August 9 – 10: FC #1 in (Germany) Hinterzarten
  - Winners: (Austria) Hannes Landerer (2 times)
- August 23 – 24: FC #2 in (Czech Republic) Frenštát pod Radhoštěm
  - Winners: (Austria) Julijan Smid (#1) / (Austria) André Fussenegger (#2)
- August 31 – September 1: FC #3 in (Poland) Szczyrk
  - Winners: (Austria) Niklas Bachlinger (#1) / (Austria) Raffael Zimmermann (#2)
- September 7 – 8: FC #4 in (Slovenia) Kranj
  - Winners: (Austria) Julijan Smid (#1) / (Austria) Stefan Rainer (#2)
- September 14 – 15: FC #5 in (Austria) Villach
  - Winners: (Austria) Marco Wörgötter (#1) / (Austria) Ulrich Wohlgenannt (#2)
- September 28 – 29: FC #6 in (Switzerland) Einsiedeln
  - Winners: (Austria) Ulrich Wohlgenannt (#1) / (Austria) Stefan Rainer (#2)
- October 4 – 6: FC #7 in (Estonia) Otepää
  - Winners: (Germany) Martin Hamann (2 times) / (Austria) Niki Humml (#3)
- December 7 – 8: FC #8 in (Switzerland) Kandersteg
- December 13 – 14: FC #9 in (Norway) Notodden
- February 1 – 2: FC #10 in (Poland) Szczyrk

=== 2024–25 FIS Ski Jumping Alpen Cup ===
- August 9 – 10: FESA #1 in (Germany) Pöhla
  - Women's Medium Hill winners: (Germany) Lara Sophie Legenmajer (2 times)
- September 14 – 15: FESA #2 in (Germany) Hinterzarten
  - Men's Normal Hill winners: (Austria) Simon Steinberger (#1) / (Slovenia) Žiga Jančar (#2)
  - Women's Normal Hill winners: (Slovenia) Jerica Jesenko (#1) / (Germany) Julina Kreibich (#2)
- September 27 – 28: FESA #3 in (Czech Republic) Ještěd
  - Men's Normal Hill winners: (Austria) Johannes Pölz (#1) / (Czech Republic) David Rygl (#2)
  - Women's Normal Hill winners: (Czech Republic) Anežka Indráčková (2 times)
- October 18 – 20: FESA #4 in (Slovenia) Velenje
- October 26 – 27: FESA #5 in (Germany) Oberwiesenthal
- December 20 – 21: FESA #6 in (Austria) Seefeld
- January 11 – 12: FESA #7 in (France) Chaux-Neuve
- March 7 – 8: FESA #8 in (Germany) Oberhof

== Ski mountaineering ==
=== Continental & World Championships/Games ===
- February 9 – 13: 2025 Asian Winter Games in (China) Harbin
- March 2 – 9: 2025 World Championship of Ski Mountaineering in (Switzerland) Morgins

=== 2024–25 ISMF Ski Mountaineering World Cup ===
- December 12 – 15: WC #1 in (France) Courchevel
- January 11 – 12: WC #2 in (Azerbaijan) Shahdag
- January 25 – 26: WC #3 in (Andorra) Arinsal–La Massana
- February 1 – 2: WC #4 in (Spain) Boí Taüll
- February 21 – 23: WC #5 in (Italy) Bormio
- March 14 – 15: WC #6 in (Austria) Schladming
- March 20 – 22: WC #7 in (Italy) Val Martello
- April 4 – 5: WC #8 in (Switzerland) Villars-sur-Ollon
- April 10 – 13: WC #9 in (Norway) Tromsø

=== 2024–25 ISMF Youth World Cup ===
- December 21 – 22: WC #1 in (Italy) Saint-Rhémy-en-Bosses
- January 25 – 26: WC #2 in (Italy) Forni di Sopra
- February 8 – 9: WC #3 in (Slovakia) Malinô Brdo
- March 26 – 30: WC #4 (Finals) in (France) Puy-Saint-Vincent

== Snowboarding ==
=== Continental & World Championships/Games ===
- February 7 – 13: 2025 Asian Winter Games in (China) Harbin
- March 16 – 30: FIS Freestyle Ski and Snowboarding World Championships 2025 in (Switzerland) Engadin

=== 2024–25 FIS Snowboard World Cup ===
- September 2: WC #1 in (New Zealand) Cardrona
  - Slopestyle winners: (Canada) Cameron Spalding (m) / (Japan) Kokomo Murase (w)
- October 19: WC #2 in (Switzerland) Chur
- November 30 – December 1: in WC #3 in (China) Beijing
- November 30 – December 1: in WC #4 in (China) Mylin Valley
- December 6 – 8: WC #5 in (China) Secret Garden
- December 7 – 8: WC #6 in (China) Yanqing
- December 12: WC #7 in (Italy) Carezza
- December 13 – 15: WC #8 in (Italy) Cervinia
- December 14: WC #9 in (Italy) Cortina d'Ampezzo
- December 18 – 20: WC #10 in (United States) Copper
- December 21: WC #11 in (Switzerland) Davos
- January 3 – 5: WC #12 in (Austria) Klagenfurt
- January 9 – 11: WC #13 in (Austria) Kreischberg
- January 11: WC #14 in (Switzerland) Scuol
- January 14 – 15: WC #15 in (Austria) Bad Gastein
- January 15 – 18: WC #16 in (Switzerland) Laax
- January 17 – 19: WC #17 in (Georgia (country)) Gudauri
- January 18 – 19: WC #18 in (Bulgaria) Bansko
- January 23 – 25: WC #19 in (Czech Republic) Dolní Morava
- January 25: WC #20 in (Slovenia) Rogla
- January 30 – February 6: WC #21 in (United States) Aspen
- February 8 – 9: WC #22 in (Canada) Val Saint-Côme
- February 14 – 15: WC #23 in (Italy) Cortina d'Ampezzo
- February 19 – 23: WC #24 in (Canada) Calgary
- March 1 – 2: WC #25 in (Poland) Krynica
- March 7 – 9: WC #26 in (Italy) Livigno
- March 12 – 14: WC #27 in (Italy) Livigno
- March 14 – 16: WC #28 in (Spain)
- March 15 – 16: WC #29 in (Germany) Winterberg
- March 20 – 22: WC #30 in (Austria) Montafon
- April 4 – 6: WC #31 in (Canada) Mont-Sainte-Anne

=== 2024–25 FIS Snowboarding Asian Cup ===
- December 30 – 31: AC #1 at (China) Galaxy Ski Resort

=== 2024–25 FIS Snowboarding European Cup ===
- November 26 – 27: EC #1 in (Austria) Pitztal
- December 14 – 15: EC #2 in (Germany) Götschen
- December 18 – 19: EC #3 in (Czech Republic) Moninec
- December 21 – 22: EC #4 in (Poland) Suche
- January 4 – 5: EC #5 in (France) Font-Romeu
- January 10 – 11: EC #6 in (Italy) Prato Nevoso
- January 10 – 11: EC #7 in (Italy) Folgaria
- January 11 – 12: EC #8 in (Austria) Montafon
- January 21 – 22: EC #9 in (Bulgaria) Bansko
- January 24 – 25: EC #10 in (France) Puy-Saint-Vincent
- January 25 – 26: EC #11 in (Austria) Simonhohe
- January 29 – 31: EC #12 in (Czech Republic) Deštné v Orlických horách
- January 31 – February 1: EC #13 in (France) St. Lary
- February 1 – 2: EC #14 in (Italy) Ratschings
- February 8 – 9: EC #15 in (Estonia) Munaka
- February 13 – 14: EC #16 in (Italy) San Pellegrino
- February 14: EC #17 in (Switzerland) Davos
- February 22 – 23: EC #18 in (Poland) Kotelnica
- February 25 – 26: EC #19 in (Germany) Grasgehren
- February 28 – March 1: EC #20 in (Slovakia) Donovaly
- March 8 – 9: EC #21 in (Austria) Gargellen
- March 13 – 14: EC #22 in (Switzerland) Lenk
- March 15 – 16: EC #23 in (Switzerland) Davos
- March 20 – 21: EC #24 in (Austria) St. Anton
- March 29 – 30: EC #25 in (France) Orcières
- April 1 – 5: EC #26 in (Austria) Kitzsteinhorn
- April 7 – 13: EC #27 in (Switzerland) Corvatsch

=== 2024–25 FIS Snowboarding Nor-Am Cup ===
- January 3 – 4: NAC #1 in (Canada) Val Saint-Côme
- January 4 – 5: NAC #2 in (Canada) Sun Peaks
- January 12 – 13: NAC #3 in (United States) Copper Mountain
- February 2 – 5: NAC #4 in (United States) Steamboat Ski Resort
- February 5 – 6: NAC #5 at (Canada) Toronto Ski Club
- February 9 – 12: NAC #6 at (United States) Sunday River
- February 11 – 12: NAC #7 in (United States) Aspen
- February 19 – 20: NAC #8 in (Canada) Val Saint-Côme
- February 23 – 27: NAC #9 at Canada Olympic Park
- February 24 – 25: NAC #10 at (United States) Holiday Valley
- February 27 – March 2: NAC #11 at (United States) Gore Mountain
- March 4 – 5: NAC #12 in (Canada) Stoneham
- March 6 – 7: NAC #13 at (Canada) Horseshoe Resort
- March 9 – 10: NAC #14 at (Canada) Horseshoe Resort
- March 19 – 21: NAC #15 at (United States) Mammoth Mountain
- April 12 – 13: NAC #16 at (Canada) Mont-Sainte-Anne

=== 2024–25 FIS Snowboarding South American Cup ===
- July 29 – August 2: SAC #1 in (Chile) Valle Nevado
  - Men's Slopestyle winners: (Argentina) Federico Chiaradio de la Iglesia (#1) / (Chile) Alvaro Yañez (#2)
  - Women's Slopestyle winners: (Chile) Antonia Yañez (2 times)
  - Men's Big Air winners: (Argentina) Federico Chiaradio de la Iglesia (#1) / (Argentina) Valentín Moreno (#2)
  - Women's Big Air winners: (Chile) Antonia Yañez (2 times)
- August 17 – 18: SAC #2 in (Argentina) Cerro Catedral
  - Men's Slopestyle winners: (Argentina) Valentín Moreno (#1) / (Chile) Alvaro Yañez (#2)
  - Women's Slopestyle winners: (Chile) Antonia Yañez (2 times)
- August 27 – 28: SAC #3 in (Chile) Corralco
  - Men's Snowboard Cross winners: (United States) Theo McLemore (#1) / (Brazil) Noah Bethônico (#2)
  - Women's Snowboard Cross winners: (China) Chuyuan Pang (#1) / (China) Yongqinglamu (#2)
- September 20 – 22: SAC #4 in (Argentina) Cerro Catedral
  - Event cancelled
- October 3: SAC #5 in (Chile) Corralco
  - Men's Snowboard Cross winners: (France) Loan Bozzolo (#1) / (France) Merlin Surget (#2)
  - Women's Snowboard Cross winners: (France) Léa Casta (#1) / (France) Manon Petit-Lenoir (#2)

=== 2024 FIS Snowboarding Australian and New Zealand Cup ===
- August 14 – 18: ANC #1 in (Australia) Mount Hotham
  - Men's Snowboard Cross winners: (Australia) Cameron Bolton (#1 & #2) / (Australia) Matthew Thomas (#3)
  - Women's Snowboard Cross winners: (Australia) Mia Clift (#1) / (Switzerland) Sophie Hediger (#2) / (Australia) Josie Baff (#3)
- August 17 – 18: ANC #2 in (New Zealand) The Remarkables
  - Slopestyle winners: (New Zealand) Rocco Jamieson (m) / (Australia) Ally Hickman (w)
- August 26 – 28: ANC #3 in (New Zealand) Cardrona
- September 30 – October 4: ANC #4 in (New Zealand) Cardrona

== Speed skiing ==
=== 2025 Speed Skiing World Cup ===
- January 27 – 31: WC #2 in (France) Vars
- February 10 – 13: WC #2 in (Spain) Formigal
- April 2 – 5: WC #3 in (Andorra) Grau Roig

== Telemark skiing ==
=== World Championships ===
- March 17 – 23: 2025 World Telemarking Championships in (France) Les Contamines-Montjoie

=== 2024–25 FIS Telemark Skiing World Cup ===
- December 19 – 21: WC #1 in (Italy) Pinzolo
- January 14 – 16: WC #2 in (Italy) Carezza
- January 24 – 25: WC #3 in (Switzerland) Melchsee-Frutt
- February 7 – 8: WC #4 in (Sweden) Trillevallen
- February 14 – 16: WC #5 in (Norway) Ål
- March 6 – 8: WC #6 in (Slovenia) Krvavec
