= 2024 IBU Junior Open European Championships =

- Host city: Jakuszyce, Poland
- Dates: 8–11 February
- Events: 6

The 9th IBU Junior Open European Championships were held from 8 to 11 February 2024 in Jakuszyce, Poland.

== Schedule ==
All times are local (UTC+1).

Date	Time	Event
8 February	10:30	Women's 12.5 km individual
8 February	14:00	Men's 15 km individual
10 February	10:30	Women's 7.5 km sprint
10 February	14:00	Men's 10 km sprint
11 February	10:10	Women's 9 km mass start 60
11 February	12:00	Men's 12 km mass start 60

== Medal summary ==
=== Medal table ===
* Host nation (Poland)

Rank	Nation	Gold	Silver	Bronze	Total
1	Austria	3	1	2	6
2	Finland	1	2	0	3
3	Croatia	1	0	0	1
3	Mongolia	1	0	0	1
5	Czech Republic	0	1	1	2
6	Poland*	0	1	0	1
6	Ukraine	0	1	0	1
8	Estonia	0	0	2	2
9	Slovakia	0	0	1	1
Totals (9 entries)		6	6	6	18

=== Men ===
Event	Gold		Silver		Bronze	
15 km individual details	Enkhbatyn Enkhsaikhan; Mongolia	44:34.8 (0+0+0+0)	Kalle Loukkaanhuhta; Finland	44:36.4 (0+0+0+0)	Jakob Kulbin; Estonia	44:54.8 (0+1+0+1)
10 km sprint details	Arttu Heikkinen; Finland	32:16.3 (0+1)	Marcin Zawół; Poland	32:45.6 (1+1)	Jakob Kulbin; Estonia	33:04.7 (1+0)
12 km mass start 60 details	Matija Legović; Croatia	39:13.6 (0+2+1+1)	Vitalii Mandzyn; Ukraine	39:33.3 (1+0+2+0)	Lukas Haslinger; Austria	39:54.6 (2+1+0+0)

=== Women ===
Event	Gold		Silver		Bronze	
12.5 km individual details	Anna Andexer; Austria	39:56.1 (0+0+0+0)	Leonie Pitzer; Austria	43:07.2 (1+1+0+0)	Heda Mikolášová; Czech Republic	43:35.6 (0+0+1+0)
7.5 km sprint details	Lara Wagner; Austria	26:52.1 (0+1)	Sonja Leinamo; Finland	27:08.0 (1+0)	Anna Andexer; Austria	27:14.1 (1+2)
9 km mass start 60 details	Anna Andexer; Austria	28:46.3 (1+0+0+2)	Svatava Mikysková; Czech Republic	29:11.2 (0+1+0+0)	Ema Kapustová; Slovakia	29:32.4 (0+1+0+2)

=== Mixed ===
Event	Gold	Silver	Bronze
6 km W + 7.5 km M single relay	Cancelled due to weather conditions		
4 × 7.5 km M+W relay	Cancelled due to weather conditions		
