= Jakob Kulbin =

Estonian biathlete (born 2005)

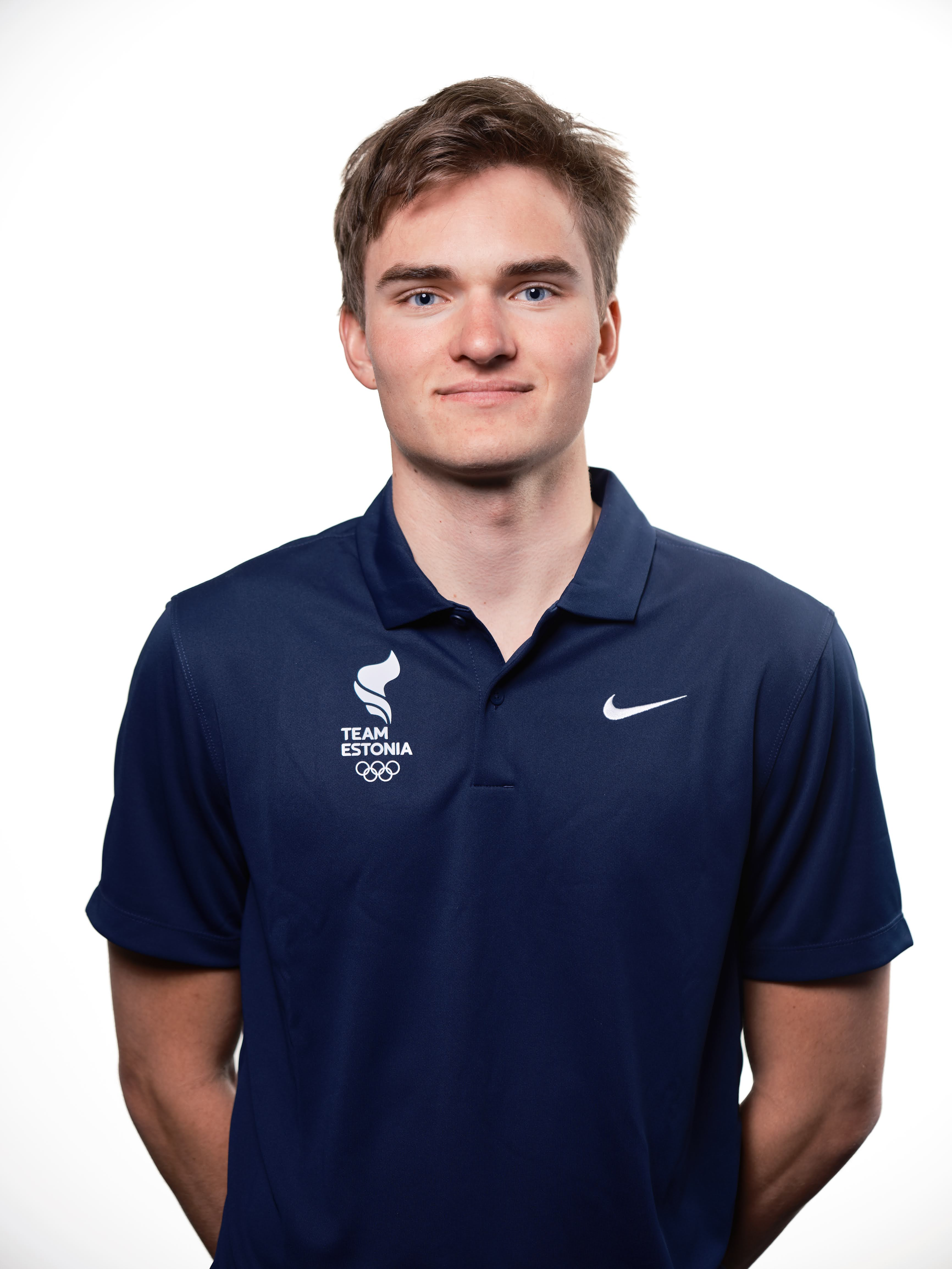
- Jakob Kulbin (2025)

Personal information
- Nationality: Estonian
- Born: 20 July 2005 (age 20) Tallinn, Estonia
- Years active: 2024-

Sport
- Country: Estonia
- Sport: Biathlon
Medal record
Men's biathlon
Representing Estonia
Junior World Championships
Silver medal – second place	2026 Arber	Mass Start 60
Bronze medal – third place	2026 Arber	Individual
Youth World Championships
Gold medal – first place	2022 Soldier Hollow	Sprint
Silver medal – second place	2024 Otepää	Mass Start 60
Junior European Championships
Bronze medal – third place	2024 Jakuszyce	Sprint
Bronze medal – third place	2024 Jakuszyce	Individual

Jakob Kulbin (born 20 July 2005) is an Estonian biathlete. He made his Biathlon World Cup debut in 2024. He is youth world champion in the sprint race and silver medalist in the mass start.

== Career ==
Jakob Kulbin first competed at the Youth World Championships in 2021, finishing eighth in the relay and 28th in the pursuit. The following winter, he participated in several Junior Cup races and returned to the Youth World Championships. There, the then 16-year-old Estonian surprisingly won the gold medal in the sprint, becoming the youngest youth world champion in biathlon history. He narrowly missed another medal in the relay, finishing fourth alongside Mark-Markos Kehva and Mehis Udam.

In the 2022/23 winter season, Kulbin competed in only a few races but won an individual Junior Cup event at the start of the season in Obertilliach. In January 2024, he made his IBU Cup debut in Ridnaun, immediately scoring points with a 16th-place finish in the sprint. Subsequently, he was given the opportunity to compete in his first World Cup relay in Antholz, finishing 13th with teammates Tuuli Tomingas, Regina Ermits, and Kristo Siimer. At the 2024 World Championships and the Soldier Hollow World Cup, he also competed in the men's relay. At the latter venue, he ran his first World Cup sprint, finishing 48th and coming very close to scoring points.

Kulbin also impressed at the junior level: at the Youth World Championships, he won silver in the mass start behind Kasper Kalkenberg, and at the Youth European Championships 2024, he won bronze in the individual and sprint events. However, a silver medal he initially won in the mass start was later revoked due to a reloading error.

Kulbin started the 2024/25 season in the IBU Cup and, after two top-30 finishes, was nominated for the World Cup team in mid-December. In Hochfilzen, he, along with Rene Zahkna, Mark-Markos Kehva, and Mehis Udam, finished tenth in the relay, marking Estonia's best men's relay result since January 2016. The following week in Le Grand-Bornand, he missed scoring points in the pursuit by just over two seconds, finishing 42nd. The Estonian men also achieved a top-10 finish in the relay in Ruhpolding. In February 2025, Kulbin competed again at the World Championships, finishing 32nd in the individual event with 18 hits.

At the Junior World Championships 2025, he narrowly missed a medal in the individual event, finishing fourth by just over two seconds. At the Military World Games, he won bronze in the sprint behind Éric Perrot and Joscha Burkhalter.

== Biathlon results ==
All results are sourced from the International Biathlon Union.

=== Olympic Games ===
0 medals

Event	Individual	Sprint	Pursuit	Mass start	Relay	Mixed relay
(Italy) 2026 Milano Cortina	87th	74th	—	—	13th	—

=== World Championships ===
0 medals

Event	Individual	Sprint	Pursuit	Mass start	Relay	Mixed relay	Single mixed relay
(Czech Republic) 2024 Nove Mesto	—	—	—	—	17th	—	—
(Switzerland) 2025 Lenzerheide	32nd	58th	DNF	—	11th	—	—

=== World Cup ===
Season	Age	Overall			Individual		Sprint		Pursuit		Mass start	
Season	Age	Races	Points	Position	Points	Position	Points	Position	Points	Position	Points	Position
2023–24	18	3/21	Didn't earn World Cup points									
2024–25	19	6/21	Didn't earn World Cup points									
2025–26	20	1/21	29	12th	29	12th	0	-	0	-	0	-

=== Youth and Junior World Championships ===
2 medals (1 gold, 1 silver)

Year	Age	Individual	Sprint	Pursuit	Mass Start	Relay	Mixed relay
(Austria) 2021 Obertilliach	15	36th	45th	28th	N/A	8th	N/A
(United States) 2022 Soldier Hollow	16	13th	Gold	21st	N/A	4th	N/A
(Kazakhstan) 2023 Shchuchinsk	17	27th	—	—	N/A	15th	—
(Estonia) 2024 Otepää	18	—	5th	N/A	Silver	9th	—
(Sweden) 2025 Östersund	19	4th	35th	N/A	16th	11th	—
(Germany) 2026 Arber	20	Bronze	9th	N/A	Silver	8th	12th
