= Biathlon at the 2024 Winter Youth Olympics – Mixed relay =

Mixed relay at the IV Winter Youth Olympic Games
- Venue: Alpensia Biathlon Centre
- Date: 24 January 2024
- Competitors: 104 from 26 nations
- Winning time: 1:15:12.4

Medalists
1st place, gold medalist(s)		Nayeli Mariotti Cavagnet; Carlotta Gautero; Hannes Bacher; Michel Deval	Italy
2nd place, silver medalist(s)		Alice Dusserre; Louise Roguet; Flavio Guy; Antonin Guy	France
3rd place, bronze medalist(s)		Heda Mikolášová; Ilona Plecháčová; Jakub Neuhäuser; Lukáš Kulhánek	Czech Republic

The mixed 4×6 km relay biathlon competition at the 2024 Winter Youth Olympics was held on 24 January 2024 at the Alpensia Biathlon Centre.

== Results ==
The race started at 10:30 and ended at 11:59.

Rank	Bib	Country	Time	Misses (Note: For every shooting bout, three spare rounds were available to use. Any additional misses would be penalised with a lap of a 150 m loop. Numbers before the plus signs refer to the number of laps taken, numbers after the plus signs refer to the number of spare rounds used.)		Deficit
Rank	Bib	Country	Time	P	S	Deficit
1st place, gold medalist(s)	1	Italy; Nayeli Mariotti Cavagnet; Carlotta Gautero; Hannes Bacher; Michel Deval	1:15:12.4; 19:00.3; 19:14.9; 18:43.7; 18:13.5	1+4; 0+0; 0+0; 1+3; 0+1	2+7; 0+1; 0+2; 2+3; 0+1	
2nd place, silver medalist(s)	2	France; Alice Dusserre; Louise Roguet; Flavio Guy; Antonin Guy	1:16:25.4; 20:20.4; 21:32.2; 17:34.3; 16:58.5	0+5; 0+1; 0+2; 0+2; 0+0	2+8; 0+1; 1+3; 1+3; 0+1	+1:13.0
3rd place, bronze medalist(s)	3	Czech Republic; Heda Mikolášová; Ilona Plecháčová; Jakub Neuhäuser; Lukáš Kulhánek	1:18:23.4; 19:15.8; 19:24.0; 19:37.0; 20:06.6	2+8; 0+2; 0+0; 1+3; 1+3	3+8; 0+1; 0+1; 1+3; 2+3	+3:11.0
4	4	Norway; Sara Tronrud; Julie Kvelvane; Sigurd Lehn; Tov Røysland	1:18:50.3; 20:49.4; 20:56.5; 20:27.1; 16:37.3	2+6; 0+0; 2+3; 0+3; 0+0	3+7; 0+0; 0+3; 3+3; 0+1	+3:37.9
5	6	Germany; Marie Keudel; Hanna Beck; Lukas Tannheimer; Björn Hederich	1:20:10.4; 20:20.0; 21:05.3; 19:18.0; 19:27.1	2+7; 0+1; 0+0; 0+3; 2+3	1+7; 0+1; 0+2; 1+3; 0+1	+4:58.0
6	16	Canada; Flora Csonka; Cheyenne Tirschmann; Luke Hulshof; Justin Konoff	1:21:55.5; 22:04.9; 22:34.4; 19:17.9; 17:58.3	0+8; 0+1; 0+2; 0+3; 0+2	4+11; 0+2; 1+3; 3+3; 0+3	+6:43.1
7	9	Austria; Anna-Lena Wolf; Lilly Fuchs; Simon Grasberger; Matthäus Schönaigner	1:22:25.9; 22:31.7; 23:08.3; 17:57.5; 18:48.4	1+8; 0+3; 0+0; 0+2; 1+3	2+8; 0+1; 1+3; 0+1; 1+3	+7:13.5
8	14	Sweden; Maya Rennermalm; Anine Karlsson; Anton Modigs; Olle Gedda	1:22:53.3; 22:15.6; 24:04.3; 19:03.1; 17:30.3	3+5; 0+0; 3+3; 0+2; 0+0	1+11; 0+3; 0+3; 1+3; 0+2	+7:40.9
9	7	Ukraine; Valeriia Sheihas; Polina Putsko; Dmytro Kriukov; Oleksandr Bilanenko	1:23:24.2; 21:02.2; 23:35.7; 20:40.1; 18:06.2	2+7; 0+1; 2+3; 0+2; 0+1	3+8; 0+2; 0+1; 3+3; 0+2	+8:11.8
10	5	Poland; Majka Germata; Amelia Liszka; Igor Kusztal; Grzegorz Galica	1:23:47.8; 24:09.9; 20:49.7; 21:01.9; 17:46.3	1+6; 0+0; 0+0; 1+3; 0+3	5+9; 3+3; 0+0; 2+3; 0+3	+8:35.4
11	8	Kazakhstan; Alema Karabayeva; Evelina Mezentseva; Anton Redkin; Kirill Zotov	1:23:56.5; 22:17.2; 22:43.2; 19:00.5; 19:55.6	3+6; 0+0; 1+3; 0+0; 2+3	0+9; 0+3; 0+3; 0+2; 0+1	+8:44.1
12	15	Estonia; Laureen Simberg; Kätrin Kärsna; Oskar Orupõld; Daniel Varikov	1:24:52.7; 22:57.3; 21:52.5; 20:27.8; 19:35.1	0+4; 0+1; 0+1; 0+1; 0+1	4+10; 0+3; 0+1; 2+2; 2+3	+9:40.3
13	11	Finland; Eveliina Hakala; Ilona Rantakömi; Eemil Koskinen; Kaapo Saarinen	1:25:59.0; 22:06.9; 23:34.6; 21:13.0; 19:04.5	5+12; 1+3; 2+3; 1+3; 1+3	5+10; 1+3; 0+2; 4+3; 0+2	+10:46.6
14	13	Bulgaria; Irina Georgieva; Raya Adzhamova; Veselin Belchinski; Georgi Dzhorgov	1:26:19.3; 23:55.4; 24:00.0; 19:31.5; 18:52.4	4+12; 2+3; 1+3; 1+3; 0+3	2+11; 1+3; 1+3; 0+2; 0+3	+11:06.9
15	23	South Korea; Kim Hye-won; Kim Min-ji; Cho Na-dan; Park Min-yong	1:26:20.3; 22:02.6; 24:16.6; 19:50.3; 20:10.8	2+10; 1+3; 0+2; 1+3; 0+2	2+6; 0+0; 1+3; 0+0; 1+3	+11:07.9
16	10	Slovenia; Ela Sever; Ajda Špitalar; Jaka Pilar; Nejc Einhauer	1:31:35.8; 20:06.6; 27:12.8; 20:43.2; 23:33.2	7+8; 0+0; 5+3; 2+3; 0+2	7+11; 1+3; 3+3; 2+3; 1+2	+16:23.4
17	21	Australia; Bridget Harvey; Alessandra Sydun-West; Phoenix Sparke; Edward Woodhouse-Bedak	Lapped; 24:12.7; 25:05.2	0+1; 1+3; 1+3	0+1; 0+3; 3+3	
18	22	Lithuania; Emilija Mincevič; Rusnė Motiejūnaitė; Juozas Augustinavičius; Daniel Buchovskij	Lapped; 22:35.5; 25:32.5	0+0; 0+1; 0+3	0+1; 0+2; 4+3	
19	20	Romania; Krisztina Silló; Paula Morozan-Irinaru; Horia Urs; Dragoș Bărbieru	Lapped; 23:47.1; 26:39.6	0+3; 0+0; 0+2	1+3; 1+3; 1+3	
20	25	Croatia; Ema Sobol; Leona Pelko; Filip Crnić; Matija Naglić	Lapped; 22:19.1; 27:12.0	0+2; 0+1; 0+3	0+3; 2+3; 3+3	
21	26	Mongolia; Erdenetungalag Khash-Erdene; Nyamsuren Demuul; Sukhbat Borkhuu; Amarsanaa Turtogtokh	Lapped; 26:32.4	1+3; 1+3	2+3; 0+1	
22	24	Greece; Maria Tsiarka; Lydia Tsiatsiou; Ioannis Anastasiadis; Antonios Prodromidis	Lapped; 27:29.8	3+3; 1+3	0+3; 0+1	
	12	Switzerland; Molly Kafka; Lena Baumann; Björn Niederhauser; Levin Kunz	Disqualified			
	19	Slovakia; Michaela Straková; Alžbeta Garguláková; Markus Sklenárik; Michal Adamov	Disqualified			
	17	United States; Alexandria Taylor; Molly Maybach; Noa Kam-Magruder; John Lohuis	Did not finish			
	18	Latvia; Keita Kolna; Madara Veckalniņa; Valters Bresme; Adrians Šņoriņšš	Did not start			
