= Ilona Plecháčová =

Czech biathlete (born 2006)

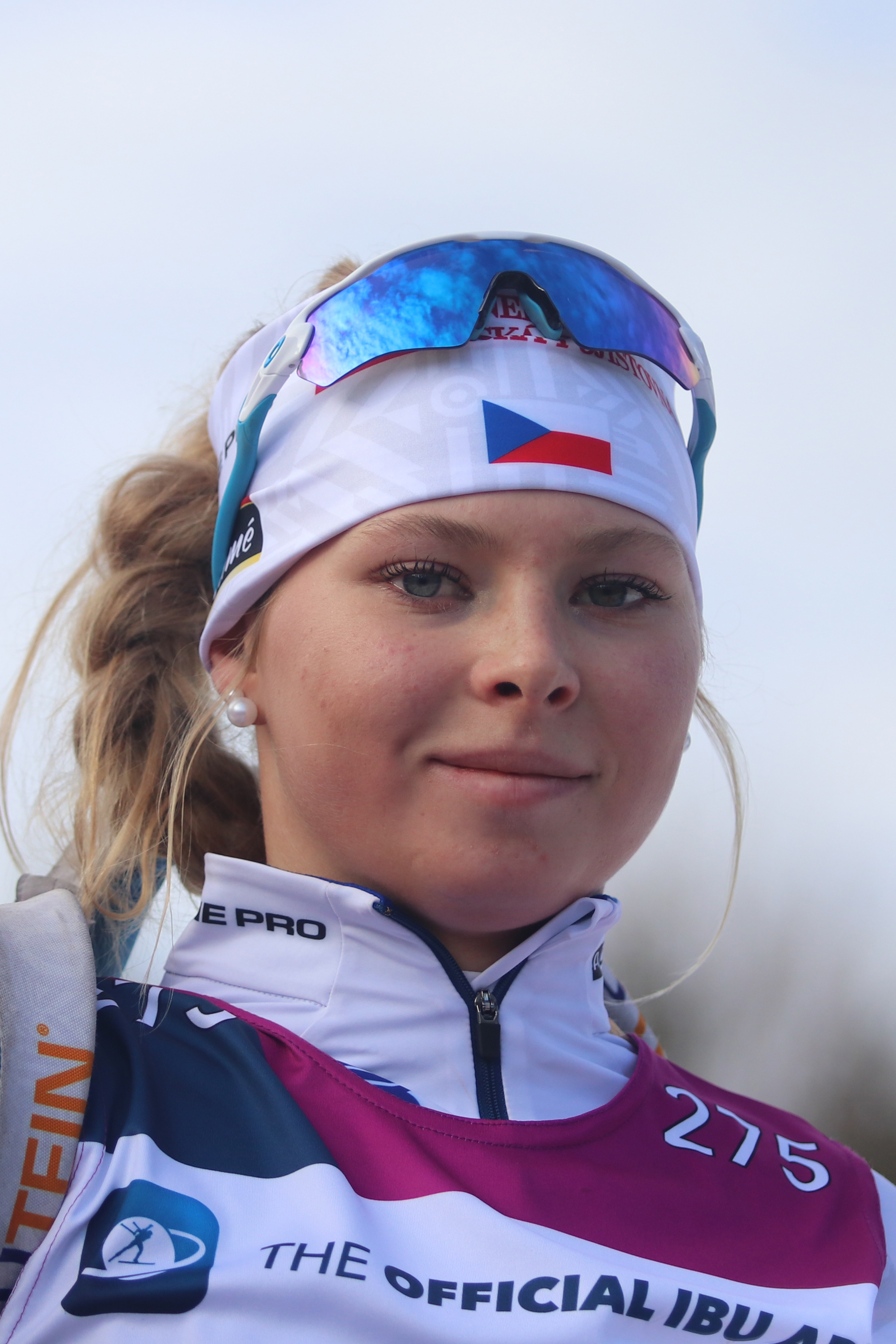

Personal information
- Born: 26 December 2006 (age 19) Jilemnice, Czech Republic

Sport
- Country: Czech Republic

Professional information
- Sport: Biathlon
- World Cup debut: 2025
Medal record
Women's biathlon
Representing Czech Republic
Youth Olympic Games
Gold medal – first place	2024 Gangwon	10 km Individual
Bronze medal – third place	2024 Gangwon	Mixed Relay
Youth World Championships
Gold medal – first place	2025 Östersund	10 km Individual
Silver medal – second place	2024 Otepää	10 km Individual
Bronze medal – third place	2025 Östersund	6 km sprint
Bronze medal – third place	2025 Östersund	9 km mass start
Bronze medal – third place	2024 Otepää	3 × 6 km relay
Bronze medal – third place	2024 Otepää	4 × 6 km mixed relay
European Youth Olympic Winter Festival
Bronze medal – third place	2023 Forni Avoltri	Sprint

Ilona Plecháčová (Czech pronunciation: [ˈɪlona ˈplɛxaːtʃovaː]; born 26 December 2006) is a Czech biathlete. She was the Youth Olympic Champion at the 2024 Gangwon Olympics in the 10 km individual event. She went on to become the 10 km individual Youth World Champion at the 2025 Junior World Championships in Östersund.

== Biathlon results ==
All results are sourced from the International Biathlon Union.

=== World Championships ===
Event	Individual	Sprint	Pursuit	Mass start	Relay	Mixed relay	Single mixed relay
(Switzerland) 2025 Lenzerheide	—	—	—	—	12th	—	—

=== Youth and Junior World Championships ===
6 medals

Year	Age	Individual	Sprint	Mass Start 60	Relay	Mixed Relay
(Estonia) 2024 Otepää	17	Silver	28th	10th	Bronze	Bronze
(Sweden) 2025 Östersund	18	Gold	Bronze	Bronze	11th	5th
(Germany) 2026 Arber	19	12th	10th	19th	5th	4th
