= Heda Mikolášová =

Czech biathlete (born 2006)

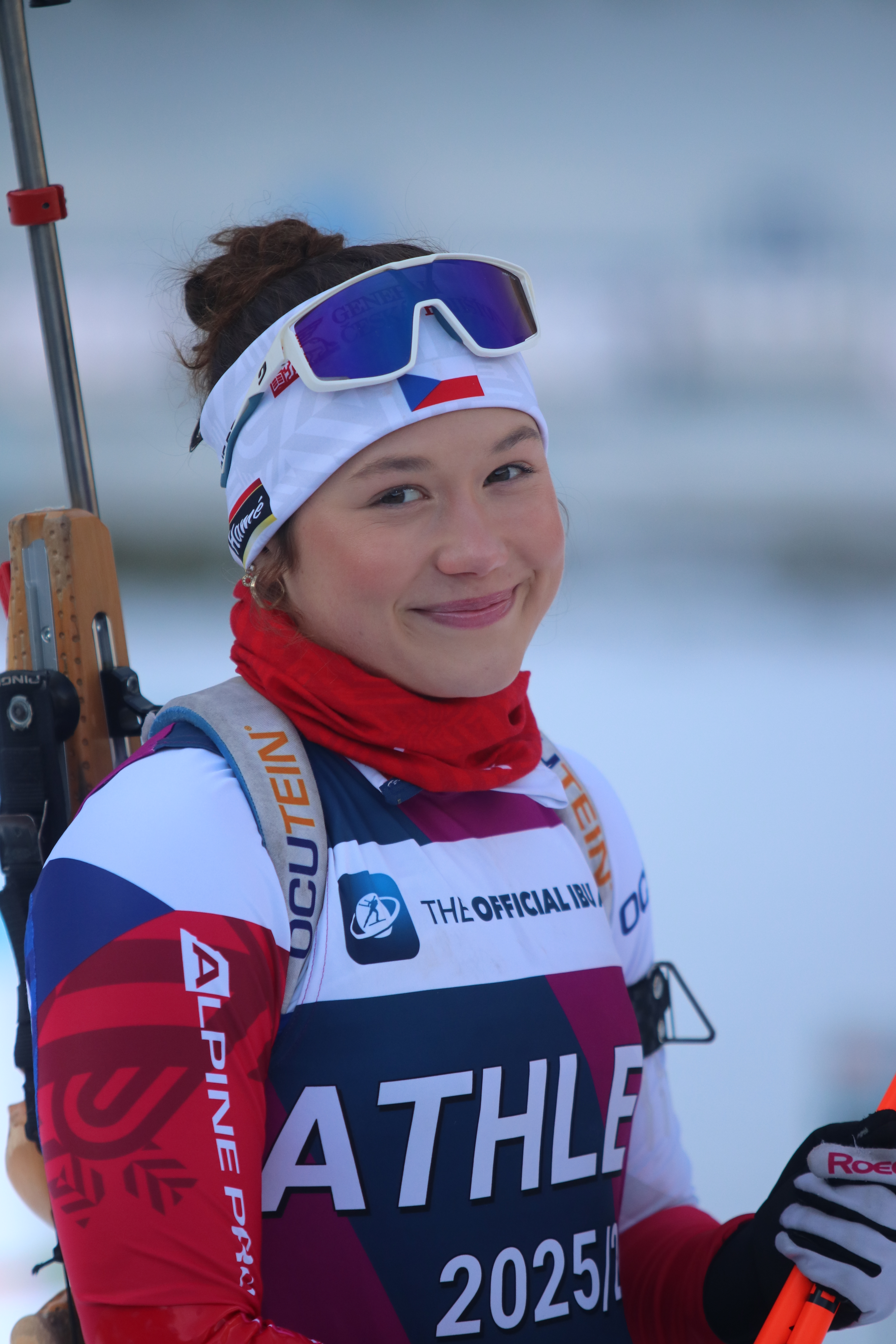

Personal information
- Born: 17 February 2006 (age 20) Brno, Czech Republic

Sport
- Sport: Biathlon
Medal record
Women's biathlon
Representing Czech Republic
Youth Olympic Games
Bronze medal – third place	2024 Gangwon	Mixed Relay
Youth World Championships
Bronze medal – third place	2024 Otepää	3 × 6 km relay
Bronze medal – third place	2024 Otepää	4 × 6 km mixed relay

Heda Mikolášová (born 17 February 2006 in Brno) is a Czech biathlete who has made several appearances in World Cup races.

She first competed in the lower-tier biathlon competition, the IBU Cup, in December 2024 in a sprint race in Obertilliach, Austria. She made her World Cup debut in a relay race in January 2025 in Ruhpolding, Germany. Her first individual start came in March 2025 in a sprint race in Oslo, Norway.

== Biathlon results ==
All results are sourced from the International Biathlon Union.

=== Youth and Junior World Championships ===
6 medals

Year	Age	Individual	Sprint	Mass Start 60	Relay	Mixed Relay
(Estonia) 2024 Otepää	18	7th	9th	24th	Bronze	Bronze
(Sweden) 2025 Östersund	19	23rd	12th	18th	11th	5th
(Germany) 2026 Arber	20	7th	14th	25th	5th	4th
