= Anna Andexer =

Austrian biathlete (born 2003)

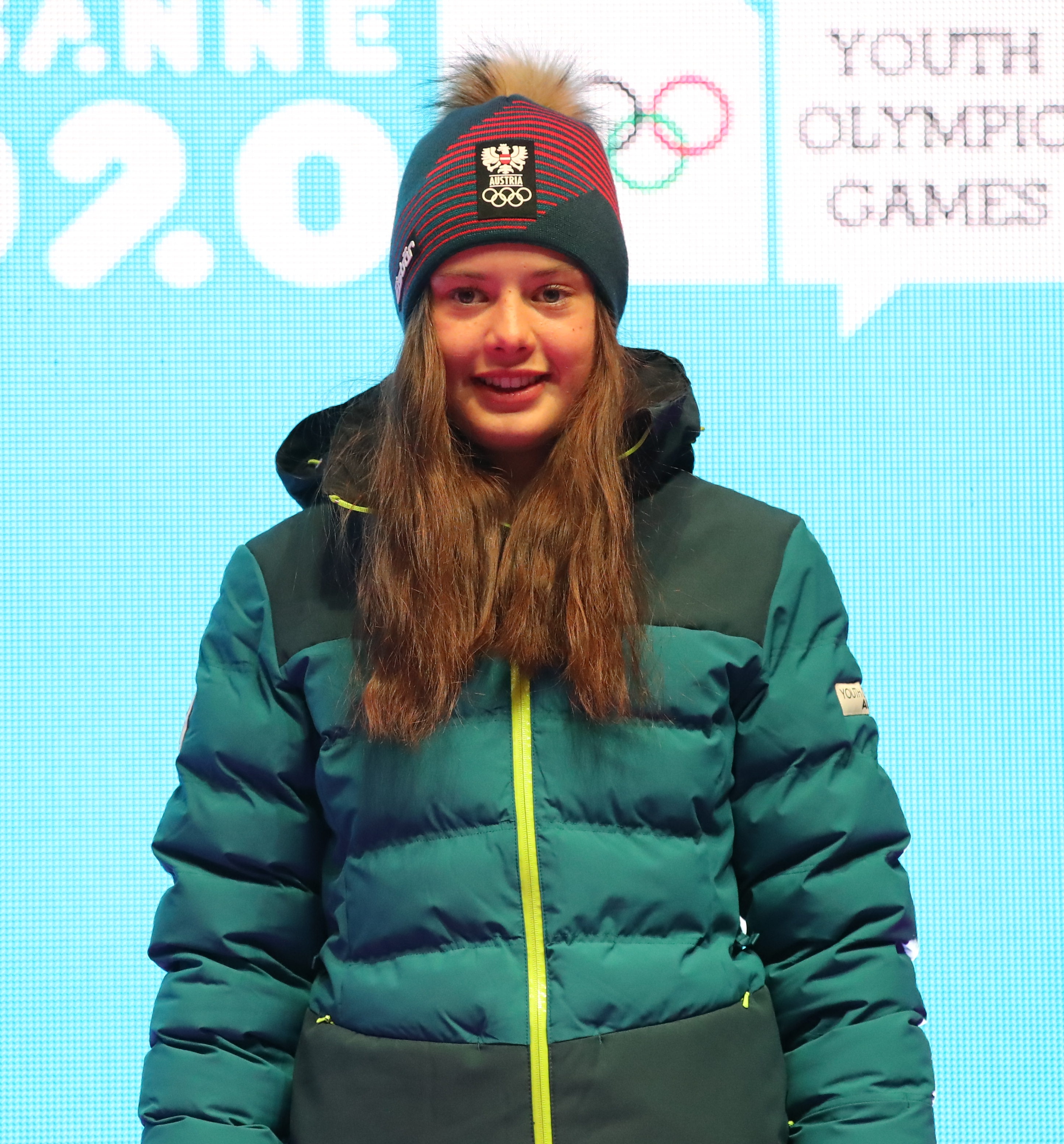
- Andexer in 2020

Personal information
- Nationality: Austrian
- Born: 26 January 2003 (age 23) Schwarzach im Pongau, Austria

Sport
- Country: Austria
- Sport: Biathlon
Medal record
Women's biathlon
Representing Austria
Youth Olympic Games
Bronze medal – third place	2020 Lausanne	Sprint
Junior World Championships
Gold medal – first place	2025 Östersund	7.5 km sprint
Bronze medal – third place	2024 Otepää	Mixed relay
Bronze medal – third place	2025 Östersund	Mixed relay

Anna Andexer (born 26 January 2003) is an Austrian biathlete. She won a bronze medal in the sprint at the 2020 Youth Olympic Games.

== Career ==
Andexer took part in her first international races at the 2020 Biathlon Junior World Championships in Switzerland. She only took part in the relay race there and finished in eighth place together with Kristina Oberthaler, Lisa Osl and Lara Wagner. This was followed by further starts in the youth and junior categories. Andexer won her first race in December 2022 at the IBU Junior Cup in Martell. The following season, she won three races in a row at the IBU Junior Cup in Ridnaun and was then allowed to compete in the IBU Cup. There, too, she finished second in the IBU Cup pursuit race in Martello and achieved a podium position for the first time. At the 2024 European Junior Biathlon Championships, she won the individual and the mass start, finishing third in the sprint behind her team-mate Lara Wagner and Sonja Leinamo from Finland. Shortly afterwards, she only won a medal in the mixed relay at the 2024 Biathlon Junior World Championships. The Austrian team with Oliver Lienbacher, Fabian Müllauer, Lara Wagner and Anna Andexer won bronze. In the individual races, Andexer achieved a top 10 finish in every competition.

== Biathlon results ==
All results are sourced from the International Biathlon Union.

=== Olympic Games ===
0 medals

Event	Individual	Sprint	Pursuit	Mass start	Relay	Mixed relay
(Italy) 2026 Milano Cortina	62nd	9th	21st	9th	15th	—

=== World Championships ===
0 medals

Event	Individual	Sprint	Pursuit	Mass start	Relay	Mixed relay	Single mixed relay
(Switzerland) 2025 Lenzerheide	56th	58th	44th	—	4th	—	—

=== Youth and Junior World Championships ===
3 medal (1 gold, 2 bronze)

Year	Age	Individual	Sprint	Pursuit	Mass Start	Relay	Mixed relay
(Switzerland) 2020 Lenzerheide	17	—	—	—	N/A	8th	N/A
(Austria) 2021 Obertilliach	18	14th	14th	16th	N/A	5th	N/A
(United States) 2022 Soldier Hollow	19	7th	10th	10th	N/A	9th	N/A
(Kazakhstan) 2023 Shchuchinsk	20	31st	13th	6th	N/A	7th	—
(Estonia) 2024 Otepää	21	6th	8th	N/A	7th	5th	Bronze
(Sweden) 2025 Östersund	22	15th	Gold	N/A	17th	6th	Bronze
