= Biathlon at the 2023 European Youth Olympic Winter Festival =

- Venue: International Biathlon Centre “Carnia Arena”
- Date: 24–28 January
- Website: eyof2023.it

Biathlon at the 2023 European Youth Olympic Winter Festival was held from 24 to 28 January at International Biathlon Centre “Carnia Arena” in Forni Avoltri, Italy.

== Medal summary ==
=== Medal table ===
* Host nation (Italy)

Rank	Nation	Gold	Silver	Bronze	Total
1	Slovenia (SLO)	2	0	0	2
2	France (FRA)	1	2	2	5
3	Germany (GER)	1	1	0	2
4	Ukraine (UKR)	1	0	1	2
5	Poland (POL)	0	1	0	1
5	Slovakia (SVK)	0	1	0	1
7	Czech Republic (CZE)	0	0	1	1
7	Italy (ITA)*	0	0	1	1
Totals (8 entries)		5	5	5	15

=== Boys' events ===
Event	Gold		Silver		Bronze	
7.5 km sprint	Pavel Trojer; Slovenia	20:38.7 (0+1)	Jakub Potoniec; Poland	21:00.0 (0+0)	Judicaël Perrillat Bottonet; France	21:12.1 (0+1)
12.5 km individual	Pavel Trojer; Slovenia	34:52.2 (1+0+0+0)	Michal Adamov; Slovakia	36:23.6 (2+0+0+0)	Guillaume Poirot; France	36:32.7 (0+1+0+1)

=== Girls' events ===
Event	Gold		Silver		Bronze	
6 km sprint	Oleksandra Merkushyna; Ukraine	19:19.1 (0+1)	Lola Bugeaut; France	20:03.3 (0+0)	Ilona Plecháčová; Czech Republic	20:06.4 (0+1)
10 km individual	Julia Tannheimer; Germany	34:02.3 (1+1+0+1)	Voldiya Galmace Paulin; France	34:12.1 (1+0+0+0)	Oleksandra Merkushyna; Ukraine	35:11.2 (2+1+1+0)

=== Mixed event ===
Event	Gold		Silver		Bronze	
Mixed relay	France; Lola Bugeaut; Voldiya Galmace Paulin; Judicaël Perrillat Bottonet; Guillaume Poirot	1:17:11.3	Germany; Alma Siegismund; Julia Tannheimer; Noah Schüttler; David Schmutz	1:17:12.5	Italy; Fabiola Miraglio Mellano; Carlotta Gautero; Nicola Giordano; Michele Carollo	1:17:34.3
