= Oleksandra Merkushyna =

Ukrainian biathlete (born 2005)

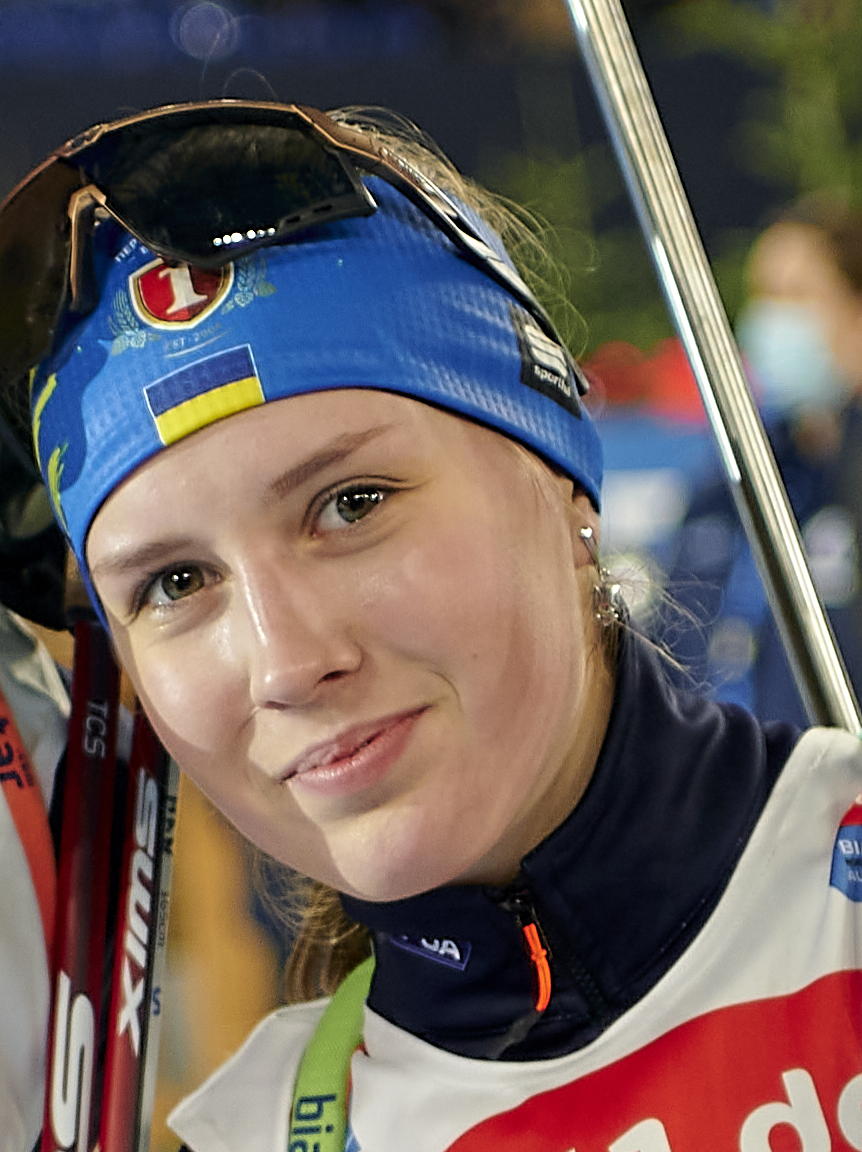
- Merkushyna in 2022

Personal information
- Nationality: Ukrainian
- Born: 14 January 2005 (age 21) Pidhorodne, Ternopil Oblast, Ukraine

Sport
- Country: Ukraine
- Sport: Biathlon
Medal record
Women's biathlon
Representing Ukraine
Winter Universiade
| Gold medal – first place | 2025 Turin | Mixed relay |
| Silver medal – second place | 2025 Turin | Mass Start 60 |
Junior World Championships
| Gold medal – first place | 2026 Arber | Mass Start 60 |
| Silver medal – second place | 2026 Arber | Individual |
| Bronze medal – third place | 2025 Östersund | Mass Start 60 |
| Bronze medal – third place | 2026 Arber | 4 × 6 km relay |
Youth World Championships
| Gold medal – first place | 2024 Otepää | Mass Start 60 |
| Bronze medal – third place | 2023 Shchuchinsk | Individual |
| Bronze medal – third place | 2023 Shchuchinsk | Mixed Relay |
Junior European Championships
| Bronze medal – third place | 2023 Madona | Mixed relay |
European Youth Olympic Winter Festival
| Gold medal – first place | 2023 Forni Avoltri | Sprint |
| Bronze medal – third place | 2023 Forni Avoltri | Individual |

Oleksandra Olehivna Merkushyna (Ukrainian: Олександра Олегівна Меркушина; born 14 January 2005) is a Ukrainian biathlete. She made her Biathlon World Cup debut in 2022.

== Career ==
In December 2019, at the age of 14, she won the Ukrainian Senior Biathlon Championship and became the youngest biathlete to ever win it. In 2022, Merkushyna was included in the reserve national team to prepare for the 2022/23 biathlon season. In July 2022, she became the champion of Ukraine in the superprint at the Summer Biathlon Junior Championships. At the 2022 Summer Biathlon Junior World Championships in Ruhpolding, she finished fifth in the sprint 57 seconds behind the winner, Germany's Selina Grotian.

In December 2022, she was called up for the first time to the main Ukrainian team for the World Cup stage in Hochfilzen. 17-year-old Oleksandra Merkushyna competed in the sprint and finished her debut race in 72nd place. At the end of 2022, she performed with Vitalii Mandzyn at the World Team Challenge, where they took 3rd place. On 19 January 2023, at the World Cup stage in Antholz-Anterselva, she qualified for the pursuit race for the first time, finishing 44th in the sprint. In preparation for the 2023 European Youth Olympic Winter Festival, she did not start in the pursuit race. As part of this competition, Merkushina won gold in the sprint and bronze in the individual race.

In February 2023, at the IBU Junior Cup in Haanja, she took third place in the relay together with Olena Horodna, Daryna Chalyk and Yuliya Horodna. Another podium in the IBU Junior Cup was followed by a bronze medal with Stepan Kinash, Vitalii Mandzyn and Daryna Chalyk at the 2023 European Junior Championships. At the World Junior Championships in Shchuchinsk she won two bronze medals in the individual race and in the mixed medley relay together with Olena Horodna, Bohdan Borkovskyi and Mykhailo Khmil.

On 15 December 2023, she won the mixed relay at the IBU Junior Cup in Ridnaun together with Stepan Kinash, Vladyslav Chykhar and Olena Horodna. In February 2024, Oleksandra won the gold medal in the Mass Start 60 at the World Junior Championships in Otepää.

== Personal life ==
Oleksandra's mother, Iryna Merkushyna, was also a biathlete and took part in World Cup competitions as part of the Ukrainian national team in the 1990s, finishing her career in 2004. Her father is a biathlon coach. Her older sister Anastasiya is also a biathlete.

== Biathlon results ==
All results are sourced from the International Biathlon Union.

=== Olympic Games ===
0 medal

| Event | Individual | Sprint | Pursuit | Mass start | Relay | Mixed relay |
|---|---|---|---|---|---|---|
| (Italy) 2026 Milano Cortina | 17th | 42nd | 48th | — | 9th | 8th |

=== World Cup ===
==== Overall standings ====
| Season | Age | Overall | | | Individual | | Sprint | | Pursuit | | Mass start | |
| Season | Age | Races | Points | Position | Points | Position | Points | Position | Points | Position | Points | Position |
|---|---|---|---|---|---|---|---|---|---|---|---|---|
| 2022–23 | 18 | 2/20 | Didn't earn World Cup points | | | | | | | | | |
| 2024–25 | 20 | 8/21 | 8 | 91st | 8 | 57th | — | — | — | — | — | — |

=== Youth and Junior World Championships ===
4 medal (1 gold, 3 bronze)

| Year | Age | Individual | Sprint | Pursuit | Mass Start | Relay | Mixed relay |
|---|---|---|---|---|---|---|---|
| (Austria) 2021 Obertilliach | 16 | DNF | 16th | 15th | N/A | 10th | N/A |
| (Kazakhstan) 2023 Shchuchinsk | 18 | Bronze | 18th | 10th | N/A | 4th | Bronze |
| (Estonia) 2024 Otepää | 19 | 21st | 11th | N/A | Gold | 11th | 8th |
| (Sweden) 2025 Östersund | 20 | 9th | 15th | N/A | Bronze | 4th | 5th |
| (Germany) 2026 Arber | 21 | Silver | 4th | N/A | Gold | Bronze | — |
