= Biathlon Junior World Championships 2024 =

Biathlon event in Estonia

2024 IBU Youth & Junior World Championships
- Host city: Otepää, Estonia
- Dates: 23 February – 2 March
- Main venue: Tehvandi Sports Center
- Events: 18

The 2024 Biathlon Junior World Championships were held from 23 February to 2 March 2024 in Otepää, Estonia.

== Schedule ==
All times are local (UTC+2).

Date	Time	Event
23 February	10:30	Youth 4 × 6 km M+W mixed relay
23 February	14:00	Junior 4 × 6 km M+W mixed relay
24 February	10:30	Youth Men's 12.5 km individual
24 February	14:00	Youth Women's 10 km individual
25 February	10:30	Junior Men's 15 km individual
25 February	14:00	Junior Women's 12.5 km individual
27 February	10:30	Youth Men's 7.5 km sprint
27 February	14:00	Youth Women's 6 km sprint
28 February	10:30	Junior Men's 10 km sprint
28 February	14:00	Junior Women's 7.5 km sprint
29 February	10:00	Youth Men's 12 km mass start 60
29 February	11:00	Youth Women's 9 km mass start 60
29 February	13:20	Junior Men's 12 km mass start 60
29 February	14:20	Junior Women's 9 km mass start 60
1 March	10:30	Youth Men's 3 × 7.5 km relay
1 March	13:30	Youth Women's 3 × 6 km relay
2 March	09:45	Junior Men's 4 × 7.5 km relay
2 March	12:40	Junior Women's 4 × 6 km relay

== Medal summary ==
=== Medal table ===
* Host nation (Estonia)

Rank	Nation	Gold	Silver	Bronze	Total
1	Norway	8	4	2	14
2	Germany	5	2	2	9
3	France	2	4	4	10
4	Sweden	2	0	0	2
5	Ukraine	1	1	0	2
6	Slovakia	0	2	0	2
7	Czech Republic	0	1	2	3
7	Italy	0	1	2	3
9	Poland	0	1	1	2
10	Croatia	0	1	0	1
10	Estonia*	0	1	0	1
12	Slovenia	0	0	2	2
13	Austria	0	0	1	1
13	Bulgaria	0	0	1	1
13	Finland	0	0	1	1
Totals (15 entries)		18	18	18	54

=== Junior events ===
==== Men ====
Event	Gold		Silver		Bronze	
15 km individual	Leonhard Pfund; Germany	39:51.3 (0+0+0+1)	Valentin Lejeune; France	40:04.1 (0+0+0+0)	Jan Guńka; Poland	40:06.6 (1+0+0+0)
10 km sprint	Isak Frey; Norway	24:01.8 (1+1)	Jan Guńka; Poland	24:12.4 (0+0)	Linus Kesper; Germany	24:27.6 (0+1)
12 km mass start 60	Sivert Gerhardsen; Norway	32:44.6 (0+0+0+0)	Isak Frey; Norway	33:11.7 (1+1+0+0)	Tobias Alm; Norway	33:17.7 (0+0+0+1)
4 × 7.5 km relay	Norway Tobias Alm; Sivert Gerhardsen; Ole Suhrke; Isak Frey	1:25:03.1 (0+1) (1+3) (0+1) (0+0) (0+1) (2+3) (0+3) (0+0)	Ukraine Stepan Kinash; Bohdan Borkovskyi; Serhii Suprun; Vitalii Mandzyn	1:25:59.6 (0+1) (0+0) (0+2) (0+3) (0+1) (0+0) (0+2) (0+2)	France Valentin Lejeune; Axel Garnier; Théo Guiraud-Poillot; Jacques Jefferies	1:26:09.1 (0+0) (0+2) (0+2) (0+0) (0+0) (0+1) (0+2) (1+3)

==== Women ====
Event	Gold		Silver		Bronze	
12.5 km individual	Julia Tannheimer; Germany	42:14.0 (0+0+0+1)	Ema Kapustová; Slovakia	43:37.9 (0+0+0+0)	Lena Repinc; Slovenia	44:01.1 (0+0+0+0)
7.5 km sprint	Sara Andersson; Sweden	21:12.6 (0+1)	Julia Tannheimer; Germany	21:21.6 (1+0)	Valentina Dimitrova; Bulgaria	21:26.4 (0+0)
9 km mass start 60	Julia Kink; Germany	29:19.8 (0+1+1+0)	Ema Kapustová; Slovakia	29:20.6 (1+1+0+0)	Fany Bertrand; France	29:26.4 (0+1+0+0)
4 × 6 km relay	Germany Alina Nußbicker; Julia Tannheimer; Julia Kink; Marlene Fichtner	1:16:46.7 (0+2) (0+1) (0+1) (0+0) (0+1) (0+0) (0+0) (0+1)	Norway Ann Kristin Aaland; Gro Randby; Guro Femsteinevik; Maren Brännare-Gran	1:17:14.4 (0+1) (0+0) (0+3) (0+2) (0+1) (0+0) (0+2) (0+2)	France Léonie Jeannier; Fany Bertrand; Célia Henaff; Lisa Siberchicot	1:17:42.1 (0+0) (0+1) (0+0) (0+0) (0+1) (0+1) (0+1) (0+0)

==== Mixed ====
Event	Gold		Silver		Bronze	
4 × 6 km M+W relay	Norway Sivert Gerhardsen; Isak Frey; Maren Brännare-Gran; Gro Randby	1:22:33.7 (0+1) (0+2) (0+1) (0+0) (0+1) (0+2) (0+1) (2+3)	Germany Leonhard Pfund; Linus Kesper; Julia Tannheimer; Marlene Fichtner	1:22:47.0 (1+3) (0+3) (0+0) (1+3) (0+1) (1+3) (0+1) (0+2)	Austria Oliver Lienbacher; Fabian Müllauer; Lara Wagner; Anna Andexer	1:23:10.2 (0+1) (0+3) (0+0) (1+3) (0+2) (1+3) (0+2) (0+1)

=== Youth events ===
==== Men ====
Event	Gold		Silver		Bronze	
12.5 km individual	Antonin Guy; France	39:39.2 (0+0+0+1)	Kasper Kalkenberg; Norway	39:48.3 (0+1+1+0)	Pavel Trojer; Slovenia	40:27.0 (0+1+0+0)
7.5 km sprint	Kasper Kalkenberg; Norway	18:48.1 (0+0)	Matija Legović; Croatia	19:18.2 (0+1)	Jimi Klemettinen; Finland	19:52.5 (0+1)
12 km mass start 60	Kasper Kalkenberg; Norway	31:36.4 (0+0+0+0)	Jakob Kulbin; Estonia	32:13.8 (0+0+0+0)	Oliver Alm; Norway	32:15.2 (1+0+1+0)
3 × 7.5 km relay	Norway Isak Skogrand; Oliver Alm; Kasper Kalkenberg	1:01:30.7 (0+0) (0+2) (0+0) (0+1) (0+0) (0+3)	France Léo Carlier; Jérémie Bouchex-Bellomie; Antonin Guy	1:03:17.1 (0+0) (0+0) (0+1) (0+2) (0+3) (0+2)	Italy Michele Carollo; Davide Cola; Nicola Giordano	1:03:40.8 (0+1) (0+0) (0+0) (0+0) (2+3) (0+2)

==== Women ====
Event	Gold		Silver		Bronze	
10 km individual	Alma Siegismund; Germany	38:33.4 (0+1+0+0)	Ilona Plecháčová; Czech Republic	39:13.7 (0+2+0+0)	Voldiya Galmace-Paulin; France	39:18.1 (0+1+1+3)
6 km sprint	Elsa Tänglander; Sweden	18:55.9 (0+1)	Voldiya Galmace-Paulin; France	19:08.4 (1+1)	Melina Gaupp; Germany	19:16.1 (0+1)
9 km mass start 60	Oleksandra Merkushyna; Ukraine	28:17.2 (1+1+0+0)	Lola Bugeaud; France	28:19.1 (1+0+0+0)	Carlotta Gautero; Italy	28:28.3 (1+1+0+0)
3 × 6 km relay	Norway Agathe Brathagen; Anna Torjussen; Silje Berg-Knutsen	1:01:42.2 (0+1) (0+2) (0+0) (0+0) (0+3) (0+1)	Italy Fabiola Miraglio Mellano; Nayeli Mariotti Cavagnet; Carlotta Gautero	1:01:48.2 (0+2) (0+2) (0+1) (0+1) (0+0) (0+0)	Czech Republic Agáta Moskvová; Ilona Plecháčová; Heda Mikolášová	1:02:24.8 (0+0) (0+2) (0+1) (0+1) (0+2) (0+2)

==== Mixed ====
Event	Gold		Silver		Bronze	
4 × 6 km M+W relay	France Léo Carlier; Antonin Guy; Voldiya Galmace-Paulin; Alice Dusserre	1:26:04.9 (0+0) (0+1) (0+0) (0+0) (1+3) (0+1) (0+2) (0+2)	Norway Oliver Alm; Kasper Kalkenberg; Silje Berg-Knutsen; Agathe Brathagen	1:27:55.9 (0+0) (2+3) (0+2) (0+2) (0+1) (0+2) (0+1) (0+0)	Czech Republic Vladimír Kocmánek; David Eliáš; Ilona Plecháčová; Heda Mikolášová	1:28:42.4 (0+0) (0+1) (0+0) (0+3) (0+0) (1+3) (0+3) (0+3)
