= Carlotta Gautero =

Italian biathlete (born 2006)

Personal information
- Born: 20 January 2006 (age 20) Cuneo, Italy

Sport
- Country: Italy

Professional information
- Sport: Biathlon
Medal record
Women's biathlon
Representing Italy
Youth Olympic Games
Gold medal – first place	2024 Gangwon	6 km Sprint
Gold medal – first place	2024 Gangwon	Mixed Relay
Youth World Championships
Silver medal – second place	2025 Östersund	10 km Individual
Silver medal – second place	2024 Otepää	3 × 6 km relay
Silver medal – second place	2023 Shchuchinsk	3 × 6 km relay
Bronze medal – third place	2025 Östersund	3 × 6 km relay
Bronze medal – third place	2024 Otepää	9 km mass start
European Youth Olympic Winter Festival
Bronze medal – third place	2023 Forni Avoltri	Mixed Relay

Carlotta Gautero (born 20 January 2006) is an Italian biathlete. She was the Youth Olympic Champion at the 2024 Gangwon Olympics in the 6 km sprint event and was part of the gold medal-winning Italian team in the mixed relay. She also has won 5 medals from the Biathlon Youth Championships including a mass start bronze in 2024 and an individual silver in 2025.

== Biathlon results ==
All results are sourced from the International Biathlon Union.

=== Youth and Junior World Championships ===
5 medals

Year	Age	Individual	Sprint	Pursuit	Mass Start 60	Relay	Mixed Relay
(Kazakhstan) 2023 Shchuchinsk	17	4th	19th	33rd	—	Silver	—
(Estonia) 2024 Otepää	18	19th	4th	—	Bronze	Silver	5th
(Sweden) 2025 Östersund	19	Silver	56th	—	9th	Bronze	13th
(Germany) 2026 Arber	20	9th	24th	—	5th	8th	6th
