= Matija Legović =

Croatian biathlete (born 2005)

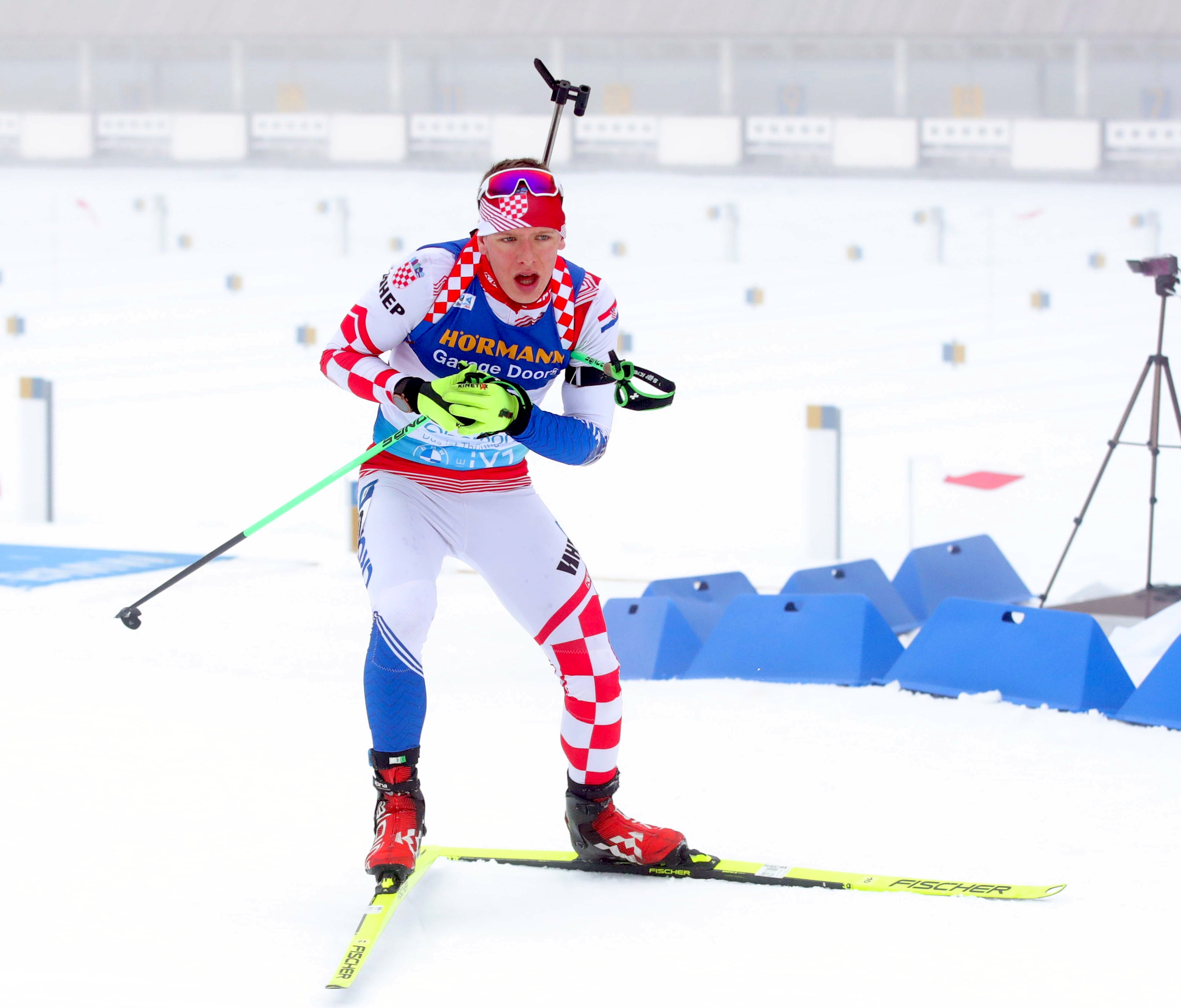
- Legović in 2023

Personal information
- Nationality: Croatian
- Born: 15 November 2005 (age 20) Rijeka, Croatia

Sport
- Country: Croatia
- Sport: Biathlon
Medal record
Men's biathlon
Representing Croatia
Youth World Championships
Silver medal – second place	2023 Shchuchinsk	7.5 km sprint
Silver medal – second place	2024 Otepää	7.5 km sprint
Bronze medal – third place	2023 Shchuchinsk	12.5 km individual

Matija Legović (born 15 November 2005) is a Croatian biathlete. He has competed in the Biathlon World Cup since 2023. He is a three-time medalist at Youth World Championships.

== Career ==
Matija Legović gained his first international experience in biathlon without prior races in the youth category at the age of 15 in early 2021 at the IBU Cup races in Arber. However, he finished outside the top 100 athletes in all races. His first Youth World Championships were not very successful, primarily due to many shooting misses. Laterr, he achieved an eighth-place finish over 10 kilometers in the cross-country Balkan Cup in February. After a season in the Junior Cup, the Croatian athlete competed again in the Youth World Championships, securing the 19th position in the individual event despite four shooting misses.

A significant improvement in both disciplines occurred in the summer of 2022 when Legović earned his first top-10 placement in the Junior World Championship in supersprint in summer biathlon. At the beginning of the 2022/23 winter season, he immediately earned ranking points by finishing 36th in the IBU Cup sprint in Idre. He notably improved this result throughout the winter with a 21st and 17th place. In Martell, he achieved his first podium finish in the Junior Cup. Subsequently, Legović was allowed to compete in the World Cup for the first time after the turn of the year. As the first World Cup athlete born in 2005, he completed the sprint race in Pokljuka in 73rd place out of 92 starters with two shooting errors.

During the 2023 World Championships, Legović surprised by finishing 48th in the sprint, earning a spot in his first pursuit race at the World Cup level. However, due to the ongoing Youth World Championships, he did not participate in the pursuit race. At the Junior World Championships, the 17-year-old secured his first medals with bronze in the individual event and silver in the sprint. In the pursuit, he dropped to 5th place after five misses in the standing position. In the Summer Biathlon Junior World Championships, he won the bronze medal in the Supersprint and convincingly took the Pursuit race, securing his first title in an IBU competition.

== Personal life ==
Legović comes from Brod Moravice, near the Slovenian border. His mother, Ivana, is the chairwoman of the local ski club, which he joined at the age of four. Legović has a younger sister.

== Biathlon results ==
All results are sourced from the International Biathlon Union.

=== Olympic Games ===
0 medals

Event	Individual	Sprint	Pursuit	Mass start	Relay	Mixed relay
(Italy) 2026 Milano Cortina	72nd	59th	LAP	—	—	—

=== World Championships ===
Event	Individual	Sprint	Pursuit	Mass start	Relay	Mixed relay	Single Mixed relay
(Germany) 2023 Oberhof	—	48th	DNS	—	—	—	—
(Switzerland) 2025 Lenzerheide	—	45th	LAP	—	—	—	—

=== Youth and Junior World Championships ===
3 medals (2 silver, 1 bronze)

Year	Age	Individual	Sprint	Pursuit	Relay	Mass Start 60
(Austria) 2021 Obertilliach	15	85th	55th	46th	19th	no competition
(United States) 2022 Soldier Hollow	16	19th	47th	49th	—	no competition
(Kazakhstan) 2023 Shchuchinsk	17	Bronze	Silver	5th	—	no competition
(Estonia) 2024 Otepaa	18	5th	Silver	no competition	—	15th
(Sweden) 2025 Östersund	19	6th	5th	no competition	—	7th
