= Grzegorz Galica =

Polish biathlete (born 2007)

Personal information
- Born: 13 March 2007 (age 19) Zakopane, Poland

Sport
- Country: Poland

Professional information
- Sport: Biathlon
- World Cup debut: 2025

Olympic Games
- Teams: 1 (2026)
Medal record
Men's biathlon
Representing Poland
Junior World Championships
Gold medal – first place	2026 Arber	Sprint
Bronze medal – third place	2025 Östersund	4 × 7.5 km relay
Youth World Championships
Silver medal – second place	2025 Östersund	Individual

Grzegorz Galica (born 13 March 2007) is a Polish biathlete. He represented Poland at the 2026 Olympics in the Individual, Sprint, Pursuit, and Men's relay events. He was part of the bronze medal-winning Polish team at the Biathlon Junior World Championships 2025. He was also the 2025 European Junior Champion in the Mass Start 60 in Altenberg.

== Biathlon results ==
All results are sourced from the International Biathlon Union.

=== Olympic Games ===
Event	Individual	Sprint	Pursuit	Mass start	Relay	Mixed relay
(Italy) 2026 Milano Cortina	33rd	37th	40th	—	11th	—

=== Youth and Junior World Championships ===
2 medals

Year	Age	Individual	Sprint	Mass Start 60	Relay	Mixed relay
(Kazakhstan) 2023 Shchuchinsk	15	47th	66th	—	—	—
(Estonia) 2024 Otepää	16	7th	6th	7th	4th	7th
(Sweden) 2025 Östersund	17	Silver	5th	4th	Bronze	7th
(Germany) 2026 Arber	19	31st	Gold	13th	7th	—
