= 2025 IBU Junior Open European Championships =

Biathlon competition in Altenberg, Germany

- Host city: Altenberg, Germany
- Dates: 22–26 January
- Events: 8

The 10th IBU Junior Open European Championships took place from 22 to 26 January 2025 in Altenberg, Germany. For the first time in the competition’s history, Greenland reached the podium when Sondre Slettemark claimed a silver medal in the mass start 60.

Bulgaria earned its second-ever gold medal at the Junior European Championships, secured by Valentina Dimitrova in the individual race. Poland won three gold medals through Grzegorz Galica and one bronze, finishing first in the overall standings of the 2025 Championships.

== Schedule ==
All times are local (UTC+1).

Date	Time	Event
22 January	10:30	Men's 15 km individual
22 January	14:30	Women's 12.5 km individual
24 January	10:45	Mixed Relay
24 January	14:00	Single Mixed Relay
25 January	10:30	Men's 10 km sprint
25 January	14:15	Women's 7.5 km sprint
26 January	10:45	Men's 12 km mass start 60
26 January	13:30	Women's 9 km mass start 60

== Medal summary ==
=== Medal table ===
* Host nation (Germany)

Rank	Nation	Gold	Silver	Bronze	Total
1	Poland	3	0	1	4
2	Germany*	2	1	1	4
3	France	1	4	2	7
4	Czech Republic	1	0	1	2
5	Bulgaria	1	0	0	1
6	Italy	0	1	2	3
7	Finland	0	1	0	1
7	Greenland	0	1	0	1
9	Slovakia	0	0	1	1
Totals (9 entries)		8	8	8	24

=== Men ===
Event	Gold		Silver		Bronze	
15 km individual details	Grzegorz Galica; Poland	41:35.7 (1+1+0+0)	Antonin Delsol; France	42:13.9 (2+0+0+0)	Arthur Iskhakov; Slovakia	42:26.1 (0+0+0+1)
10 km sprint details	Fabian Kaskel; Germany	27:42.3 (0+0)	Elias Seidl; Germany	27:44.5 (1+0)	Camille Grataloup-Manissolle; France	27:56.2 (0+1)
12 km mass start 60 details	Grzegorz Galica; Poland	35:02.4 (1+0+2+0)	Sondre Slettemark; Greenland	35:11.1 (1+0+0+1)	Martin Botet; France	35:15.2 (1+0+1+0)

=== Women ===
Event	Gold		Silver		Bronze	
12.5 km individual details	Valentina Dimitrova; Bulgaria	41:12.5 (1+1+0+0)	Eveliina Hakala; Finland	41:16.2 (0+0+0+0)	Amelia Liszka; Poland	42:07.5 (0+0+0+1)
7.5 km sprint details	Anaëlle Bondoux; France	24:17.3 (1+0)	Coralie Perrin; France	24:19.9 (0+0)	Charlotte Gallbronner; Germany	24:32.0 (0+0)
9 km mass start 60 details	Kateřina Pavlů; Czech Republic	30:05.6 (0+1+1+0)	Fabiana Carpella; Italy	30:19.0 (1+0+1+0)	Sara Scattolo; Italy	30:28.5 (0+1+0+2)

=== Mixed ===
Event	Gold		Silver		Bronze	
6 km M + 7.5 km W single relay	Germany Linus Kesper; Charlotte Gallbronner	40:47.0 (0+0) (0+1) (0+0) (0+1) (0+1) (1+3) (0+1) (0+0)	France Léo Carlier; Célia Henaff	40:47.2 (0+2) (0+0) (0+1) (0+0) (0+1) (0+0) (0+1) (1+3)	Czech Republic David Eliáš; Kateřina Pavlů	42:03.7 (0+3) (0+2) (0+1) (0+2) (1+3) (0+1) (0+3) (0+1)
4 × 6 km M+W relay details	Poland Jakub Potoniec; Grzegorz Galica; Anna Nędza-Kubiniec; Barbara Skrobiszewska	1:15:20.9 (0+0) (0+2) (0+1) (0+0) (0+2) (0+0) (0+1) (0+0)	France Camille Grataloup-Manissolle; Antonin Delsol; Lola Bugeaud; Louise Roguet	1:16:02.8 (0+1) (0+1) (0+2) (0+1) (0+0) (0+2) (0+0) (0+1)	Italy Davide Compagnoni; Felix Ratschiller; Fabiana Carpella; Sara Scattolo	1:16:25.4 (0+0) (0+2) (0+0) (0+0) (0+0) (0+0) (0+1) (2+3)

== See also ==
- 2024 IBU Open European Championships
- 2025 IBU Open European Championships
