= Biathlon Junior World Championships 2025 =

Biathlon event in Sweden

2025 IBU Youth & Junior World Championships
- Host city: Östersund, Sweden
- Dates: 24 February – 5 March
- Main venue: Östersund Ski Stadium
- Participation: 456 athletes from 40 nations
- Events: 18

The 2025 Biathlon Junior World Championships were held from 24 February to 5 March 2025 in Östersund, Sweden.

== Medal summary ==
=== Medal table ===
* Host nation (Sweden)

Rank	Nation	Gold	Silver	Bronze	Total
1	France	6	6	4	16
2	Norway	6	2	2	10
3	Germany	3	5	0	8
4	Sweden*	1	1	0	2
5	Czech Republic	1	0	5	6
6	Austria	1	0	1	2
7	Italy	0	1	2	3
8	Poland	0	1	1	2
9	Finland	0	1	0	1
9	Slovakia	0	1	0	1
11	Slovenia	0	0	1	1
11	Switzerland	0	0	1	1
11	Ukraine	0	0	1	1
Totals (13 entries)		18	18	18	54

=== Junior events ===
==== Men ====
Event	Gold		Silver		Bronze	
15 km individual details	Sivert Gerhardsen; Norway	36:54.5 (0+0+0+0)	Kasper Kalkenberg; Norway	38:17.1 (0+0+0+1)	James Pacal; Switzerland	38:29.6 (0+0+0+0)
10 km sprint details	Håvard Tosterud; Norway	26:33.6 (0+0)	Jakub Borguľa; Slovakia	27:07.0 (0+0)	Petr Hák; Czech Republic	27:11.0 (0+0)
12 km mass start 60 details	Kasper Kalkenberg; Norway	35:20.9 (1+2+0+2)	Jimi Klemettinen; Finland	35:27.4 (0+1+1+1)	Petr Hák; Czech Republic	35:53.8 (1+0+2+2)
4 × 7.5 km relay details	Norway Andreas Aas; Sivert Gerhardsen; Håvard Tosterud; Kasper Kalkenberg	1:20:43.0 (0+3) (0+2) (0+0) (0+1) (0+0) (0+0) (0+2) (0+2)	Germany Linus Kesper; Fabian Kaskel; Elias Seidl; Leonhard Pfund	1:21:02.5 (0+1) (0+0) (0+0) (0+0) (0+0) (0+3) (0+1) (0+1)	Poland Jakub Potoniec; Grzegorz Galica; Konrad Badacz; Fabian Suchodolski	1:22:35.2 (0+2) (0+3) (0+1) (0+1) (0+1) (0+3) (0+1) (0+3)

==== Women ====
Event	Gold		Silver		Bronze	
12.5 km individual details	Célia Henaff; France	34:05.0 (0+0+0+0)	Amandine Mengin; France	34:27.5 (0+0+0+1)	Fabiana Carpella; Italy	35:10.6 (0+0+0+1)
7.5 km sprint details	Anna Andexer; Austria	22:22.0 (0+1)	Sara Andersson; Sweden	22:30.9 (0+1)	Amandine Mengin; France	22:52.7 (0+1)
9 km mass start 60 details	Sara Andersson; Sweden	28:33.0 (2+0+2+0)	Anaëlle Bondoux; France	28:45.5 (2+0+0+0)	Oleksandra Merkushyna; Ukraine	28:50.2 (2+0+0+1)
4 × 6 km relay details	France Célia Henaff; Voldiya Galmace-Paulin; Anaëlle Bondoux; Amandine Mengin	1:15:12.4 (0+3) (0+1) (0+0) (0+1) (0+0) (0+3) (0+3) (0+2)	Germany Charlotte Gallbronner; Lea Zimmermann; Alma Siegismund; Lotta De Buhr	1:16:19.2 (0+0) (1+3) (0+0) (0+0) (0+2) (1+3) (0+2) (0+3)	Norway Ann Kristin Aaland; Siri Skar; Guro Ytterhus; Silje Berg-Knutsen	1:16:31.6 (0+1) (0+1) (0+0) (0+2) (0+1) (2+3) (0+1) (1+3)

==== Mixed ====
Event	Gold		Silver		Bronze	
4 × 6 km W+M relay details	Germany Alma Siegismund; Lotta De Buhr; Fabian Kaskel; Linus Kesper	1:12:01.2 (0+2) (0+1) (0+1) (0+1) (0+1) (0+1) (0+1) (0+1)	France Voldiya Galmace Paulin; Amandine Mengin; Gaëtan Paturel; Edgar Geny	1:12:18.1 (1+3) (0+1) (0+1) (0+0) (3+3) (0+2) (0+1) (0+2)	Austria Wilma Anhaus; Anna Andexer; Thomas Marchl; Fabian Müllauer	1:12:19.7 (0+0) (0+3) (0+0) (0+0) (0+2) (0+1) (0+1) (0+3)

=== Youth events ===
==== Men ====
Event	Gold		Silver		Bronze	
12.5 km individual details	Antonin Guy; France	33:51.9 (0+0+0+1)	Grzegorz Galica; Poland	33:56.4 (0+1+0+1)	Léo Carlier; France	34:01.3 (2+0+0+0)
7.5 km sprint details	Lukas Tannheimer; Germany	18:56.3 (0+1)	Léo Carlier; France	19:11.1 (0+1)	Tov Røysland; Norway	19:13.4 (0+0)
12 km mass start 60 details	Léo Carlier; France	35:52.2 (2+0+1+1)	Flavio Guy; France	36:12.6 (0+0+3+3)	Camille Grataloup-Manissolle; France	36:25.5 (1+1+2+2)
3 × 7.5 km relay details	France Camille Grataloup-Manissolle; Antonin Guy; Léo Carlier	1:02:04.1 (0+0) (0+3) (0+0) (0+1) (0+0) (0+2)	Germany Luca Anding; Lukas Tannheimer; Korbi Kübler	1:02:39.7 (0+0) (0+2) (0+1) (0+3) (0+0) (0+2)	Czech Republic Jakub Bouška; František Jelínek; Michael Málek	1:04:29.1 (0+1) (0+3) (0+1) (0+3) (0+1) (0+0)

==== Women ====
Event	Gold		Silver		Bronze	
10 km individual details	Ilona Plecháčová; Czech Republic	34:16.5 (1+1+1+0)	Carlotta Gautero; Italy	35:04.0 (0+0+0+2)	Manca Caserman; Slovenia	35:11.4 (0+1+1+1)
6 km sprint details	Martine Skog; Norway	19:07.1 (0+0)	Louise Roguet; France	19:24.6 (1+0)	Ilona Plecháčová; Czech Republic	19:32.9 (1+1)
9 km mass start 60 details	Louise Roguet; France	27:39.1 (0+1+0+1)	Lena Siegmund; Germany	27:47.9 (1+0+0+0)	Ilona Plecháčová; Czech Republic	27:48.3 (1+2+0+0)
3 × 6 km relay details	Germany Melina Gaupp; Sydney Wüstling; Lena Siegmund	1:03:24.2 (1+3) (0+1) (0+0) (0+1) (0+1) (0+1)	Norway Sara Tronrud; Bjørg Eide; Martine Skog	1:03:45.0 (0+1) (0+3) (0+1) (0+1) (0+0) (0+3)	Italy Nayeli Mariotti Cavagnet; Gaia Condolo; Carlotta Gautero	1:04:01.5 (0+0) (0+2) (0+0) (0+1) (0+0) (0+3)

==== Mixed ====
Event	Gold		Silver		Bronze	
4 × 6 km W+M relay	Norway Martine Skog; Bjørg Eide; Tov Røysland; Leo Gundersen	1:13:44.4 (0+1) (0+1) (0+0) (0+2) (0+2) (0+1) (0+0) (0+2)	Germany Lena Siegmund; Melina Gaupp; Lukas Tannheimer; Korbi Kübler	1:14:10.3 (0+1) (0+1) (0+1) (2+3) (0+0) (1+3) (0+0) (0+1)	France Louise Roguet; Lola Bugeaud; Camille Grataloup-Manissolle; Léo Carlier	1:14:34.1 (0+3) (0+1) (0+0) (0+2) (0+2) (0+1) (0+2) (0+1)

== See also ==
- 2024–25 Biathlon World Cup
- 2024–25 Biathlon IBU Cup
- 2025 Biathlon World Championships
- 2025 IBU Open European Championships
- 2025 IBU Junior Open European Championships
