= Judo at the 2004 Summer Olympics – Men's 100 kg =

Men's 100 kg at the Games of the XXVIII Olympiad
- Venue: Ano Liossia Olympic Hall
- Dates: 19 August 2004
- Competitors: 33 from 33 nations
- Winning score: 0101

Medalists
1st place, gold medalist(s)		Ihar Makarau	Belarus
2nd place, silver medalist(s)		Jang Sung-ho	South Korea
3rd place, bronze medalist(s)		Michael Jurack	Germany
3rd place, bronze medalist(s)		Ariel Ze'evi	Israel

Men's 100 kg competition in judo at the 2004 Summer Olympics was held on August 19 at the Ano Liossia Olympic Hall.

This event was the second-heaviest of the men's judo weight classes, limiting competitors to a maximum of 100 kilograms of body mass. Like all other judo events, bouts lasted five minutes. If the bout was still tied at the end, it was extended for another five-minute, sudden-death period; if neither judoka scored during that period, the match is decided by the judges. The tournament bracket consisted of a single-elimination contest culminating in a gold medal match. There was also a repechage to determine the winners of the two bronze medals. Each judoka who had lost to a semifinalist competed in the repechage. The two judokas who lost in the semifinals faced the winner of the opposite half of the bracket's repechage in bronze medal bouts.

== Schedule ==
All times are Greece Standard Time (UTC+2)

Date	Time	Round
Thursday, 19 August 2004	10:30; 13:00; 17:00	Preliminaries; Repechage; Final

== Qualifying athletes ==
Mat	Athlete	Country
1	Kosei Inoue	Japan
1	Amel Mekić	Bosnia and Herzegovina
1	Antal Kovács	Hungary
1	Martin Kelly	Australia
1	Barry Kirk Jackman	Barbados
1	Movlud Miraliyev	Azerbaijan
1	Elco van der Geest	Netherlands
1	Bassel El Gharbawy	Egypt
1	Andrés Loforte	Argentina
1	Ramón Ayala	Puerto Rico
1	Sami Belgroun	Algeria
1	Batjargalyn Odkhüü	Mongolia
1	Iveri Jikurauli	Georgia
1	Timo Peltola	Finland
1	José Vásquez	Dominican Republic
1	Ihar Makarau	Belarus
1	Askhat Zhitkeyev	Kazakhstan
2	Jang Sung-ho	South Korea
2	Franck Moussima	Cameroon
2	Yhya Hasaba	Syria
2	Rhadi Ferguson	United States
2	Mário Sabino	Brazil
2	Ariel Ze'evi	Israel
2	Michele Monti	Italy
2	Nicolas Gill	Canada
2	Ghislain Lemaire	France
2	Zoltán Pálkovács	Slovakia
2	Dmitry Maksimov	Russia
2	Masoud Khosravinejad	Iran
2	Vitaliy Bubon	Ukraine
2	Oreidis Despaigne	Cuba
2	Vasileios Iliadis	Greece
2	Michael Jurack	Germany

== Tournament results ==
=== Final ===
Final
1	Ihar Makarau (BLR)	0101
2	Jang Sung-ho (KOR)	0020

=== Mat 1 ===
Round of 64
Kosei Inoue (JPN)	1010
Amel Mekić (BIH)	0000

Round of 32
Kosei Inoue (JPN)	0002
Antal Kovács (HUN)	0001
Martin Kelly (AUS)	1101
Barry Kirk Jackman (BAR)	0010
Movlud Miraliyev (AZE)	0001
Elco van der Geest (NED)	1011
Bassel El Gharbawy (EGY)	0002
Andrés Loforte (ARG)	0001
Ramón Ayala (PUR)	0000
Sami Belgroun (ALG)	1010
Batjargalyn Odkhüü (MGL)	0000
Iveri Jikurauli (GEO)	1000
Timo Peltola (FIN)	1001
José Vásquez (DOM)	0001
Ihar Makarau (BLR)	1010
Askhat Zhitkeyev (KAZ)	0010

Round of 16
Kosei Inoue (JPN)	1000
Martin Kelly (AUS)	0000
Elco van der Geest (NED)	1000
Bassel El Gharbawy (EGY)	0000
Sami Belgroun (ALG)	0001
Iveri Jikurauli (GEO)	1010
Timo Peltola (FIN)	0000
Ihar Makarau (BLR)	0200

Quarterfinals
Kosei Inoue (JPN)	0010
Elco van der Geest (NED)	1020
Iveri Jikurauli (GEO)	0001
Ihar Makarau (BLR)	0011

Semifinals
Elco van der Geest (NED)	0001
Ihar Makarau (BLR)	0011

=== Mat 2 ===
Round of 64

Round of 32
Jang Sung-ho (KOR)	1000
Franck Moussima (CMR)	0000
Yhya Hasaba (SYR)	0001
Rhadi Ferguson (USA)	1110
Mário Sabino (BRA)	0100
Ariel Ze'evi (ISR)	1010
Michele Monti (ITA)	1003
Nicolas Gill (CAN)	0001
Ghislain Lemaire (FRA)	1000
Zoltán Pálkovács (SVK)	0000
Dmitry Maksimov (RUS)	0100
Masoud Khosravinejad (IRI)	0001
Vitaliy Bubon (UKR)	0010
Oreidis Despaigne (CUB)	0100
Vasileios Iliadis (GRE)	0000
Michael Jurack (GER)	1000

Round of 16
Jang Sung-ho (KOR)	0011
Rhadi Ferguson (USA)	0010
Ariel Ze'evi (ISR)	1011
Michele Monti (ITA)	0111
Ghislain Lemaire (FRA)	1001
Dmitry Maksimov (RUS)	0000
Oreidis Despaigne (CUB)	0000
Michael Jurack (GER)	1001

Quarterfinals
Jang Sung-ho (KOR)	1002
Ariel Ze'evi (ISR)	0110
Ghislain Lemaire (FRA)	0012
Michael Jurack (GER)	0020

Semifinals
Jang Sung-ho (KOR)	1001
Michael Jurack (GER)	0000

== Repechage ==
First round
Movlud Miraliyev (AZE)	1010
Bassel El Gharbawy (EGY)	0000
Askhat Zhitkeyev (KAZ)	0221
Timo Peltola (FIN)	0001
Franck Moussima (CMR)	0011
Rhadi Ferguson (USA)	0001
Vasileios Iliadis (GRE)	0010
Oreidis Despaigne (CUB)	1000

Second round
Kosei Inoue (JPN)	0000
Movlud Miraliyev (AZE)	1011
Iveri Jikurauli (GEO)	0000
Askhat Zhitkeyev (KAZ)	1000
Ariel Ze'evi (ISR)	0210
Franck Moussima (CMR)	0000
Ghislain Lemaire (FRA)	0221
Oreidis Despaigne (CUB)	0000

Third round
Movlud Miraliyev (AZE)	0021
Askhat Zhitkeyev (KAZ)	0001
Ariel Ze'evi (ISR)	1001
Ghislain Lemaire (FRA)	0000

Bronze medal finals
Michael Jurack (GER)	1030
Movlud Miraliyev (AZE)	0001
Elco van der Geest (NED)	0001
Ariel Ze'evi (ISR)	1002
