= Bosnia and Herzegovina at the 2008 Summer Olympics =

- IOC code: BIH
- NOC: Olympic Committee of Bosnia and Herzegovina
- Website: www.okbih.ba (in Bosnian, Serbian, and Croatian)

in Beijing
- Competitors: 5 in 4 sports
- Flag bearer: Amel Mekić
- Medals: Gold 0 Silver 0 Bronze 0 Total 0

Summer Olympics appearances (overview)
- 1992; 1996; 2000; 2004; 2008; 2012; 2016; 2020; 2024; 2028

Other related appearances
- Yugoslavia (1920–1992 W)

Bosnia and Herzegovina, represented by the Olympic Committee of Bosnia and Herzegovina (BiH OK), sent a team to compete in the 2008 Summer Olympics in Beijing, China. The team consisted of 5 competitors.

== Athletics ==
Key

- Note–Ranks given for track events are within the athlete's heat only
- Q = Qualified for the next round
- q = Qualified for the next round as a fastest loser or, in field events, by position without achieving the qualifying target
- NR = National record
- N/A = Round not applicable for the event
- Bye = Athlete not required to compete in round

Men
Track & road events

Athlete	Event	Qualification		Final	
Athlete	Event	Distance	Position	Distance	Position
Hamza Alić	Shot put	19.87	17	Did not advance	

Women
Track & road events

Athlete	Event	Final	
Athlete	Event	Result	Rank
Lucija Kimani	Marathon	2:35:47 NR	42

== Judo ==
Men

Athlete	Event	Round of 32	Round of 16	Quarterfinals	Semifinals	Repechage 1	Repechage 2	Repechage 3	Final / BM	
Athlete	Event	Opposition Result	Opposition Result	Opposition Result	Opposition Result	Opposition Result	Opposition Result	Opposition Result	Opposition Result	Rank
Amel Mekić	Men's −100 kg	Volmar (USA); W 0200–0000	Zhitkeyev (KAZ); L 0001–1010	Did not advance		Al-Enezi (KUW); W 1100–0001	Hadfi (HUN); L 0011–1001	Did not advance		

== Shooting ==
Men

Athlete	Event	Qualification		Final	
Athlete	Event	Points	Rank	Points	Rank
Nedžad Fazlija	10 m air rifle	588	35	Did not advance	
Nedžad Fazlija	50 m rifle prone	586	45	Did not advance	
Nedžad Fazlija	50 m rifle 3 positions	1148	43	Did not advance	

== Swimming ==
Men

Athlete	Event	Heat		Semifinal		Final	
Athlete	Event	Time	Rank	Time	Rank	Time	Rank
Nedim Nišić	100 m butterfly	57.16	64	Did not advance			
