= Movlud Miraliyev =

Azerbaijani Olympic judoka

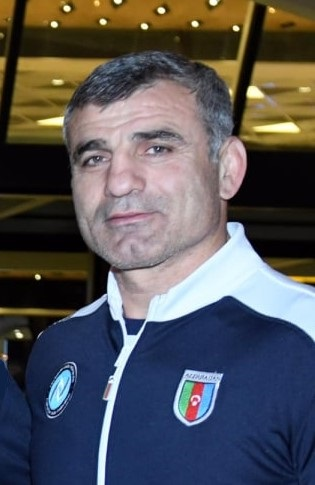

Personal information
- Born: 27 February 1974 (age 52) Kitob, Kashkadarya Region, Uzbek SSR, USSR
- Occupation: Judoka

Sport
- Country: Azerbaijan
- Sport: Judo
- Weight class: –100 kg, +100 kg

Achievements and titles
- Olympic Games: (bronze) (2008)
- World Champ.: (bronze) (2003)
- European Champ.: 7th (2007)
Medal record
Men's judo
Representing Azerbaijan
Olympic Games
Bronze medal – third place	2008 Beijing	‍–‍100 kg
World Championships
Bronze medal – third place	2003 Osaka	Open

Profile at external databases
- IJF: 1767
- JudoInside.com: 8499
- Updated on 30 May 2023

Movlud Miraliyev (born 27 February 1974 in Kitob, Qashqadaryo Province, Uzbekistan) is an Azerbaijani retired judoka of Turkish Meskhetian origin.

Miraliyev finished in joint fifth place in the half-heavyweight (100 kg) division at the 2004 Summer Olympics, having lost the bronze medal match to Michael Jurack of Germany, however, he defeated Olympic Champion and three-time World Champion Kosei Inoue ura nage in the 3-th match. He won the Bronze Medal match against Przemysław Matyjaszek of Poland at the 2008 Summer Olympics.

== 2008 Olympic Games in Beijing ==
After the defeat at the Bronze Medal match against Michael Jurack of Germany at the 2004 Olympics in Athens, Miraliyev decides to return to the Olympics one more time. On the second match on mat 2 for the men under 100 kg, Miraliyev defeated Hassane Azzoun of Algeria by ippon. In the round of 16, the Azerbaijani fought against Levan Zhorzholiani of Georgia and won by Kata-gatame allowing him to step into the quarterfinals. In the quarterfinals, he came up against Daniel Brata of Romania and won by earning a wazari using the Kata Guruma. After that victory, he advances to the semifinal one step closer to the finals. At the semifinals, it comes to him against Naidangiin Tüvshinbayar of Mongolia who defeated the top judokas such as Olympic champion Keiji Suzuki of Japan. Throughout the round, no points have been scored. During the golden score round, the Mongolian scored a yuko which ended the match. Nevertheless, Miraliyev has a chance of winning a medal though it's not gold or silver. At the bronze medal match, it's the Azerbaijani judoka against Przemysław Matyjaszek of Poland. About 5 seconds before the time ran out, Miraliyev scored a wazari. At the end, Movlud Miraliyev won the Bronze Medal Match under -100 kg. He's the second judoka of Azerbaijan who won an Olympic medal after Elnur Mammadli.

Miraliyev retired from sports after the 2008 Olympics.

In 2016 he became the assistant of Zayzenbaher, head coach of Azerbaijani national judo team.

== Achievements ==
Year	Tournament	Place	Weight class
2008	Olympic Games	3rd	Half heavyweight (100 kg)
2007	World Judo Championships	7th	Open class
2007	European Judo Championships	7th	Half heavyweight (100 kg)
2004	Olympic Games	5th	Half heavyweight (100 kg)
2003	World Judo Championships	3rd	Open class
2026	World Judo Championships	1	Half heavyweight (100 kg)
