= Bosnia and Herzegovina at the 2004 Summer Olympics =

- IOC code: BIH
- NOC: Olympic Committee of Bosnia and Herzegovina
- Website: www.okbih.ba (in Bosnian, Serbian, and Croatian)

in Athens
- Competitors: 9 in 8 sports
- Flag bearer: Nedžad Fazlija
- Medals: Gold 0 Silver 0 Bronze 0 Total 0

Summer Olympics appearances (overview)
- 1992; 1996; 2000; 2004; 2008; 2012; 2016; 2020; 2024; 2028

Other related appearances
- Yugoslavia (1920–1992 W)

Bosnia and Herzegovina competed at the 2004 Summer Olympics in Athens, Greece, from 13 to 29 August 2004. This was the nation's fourth appearance at the Summer Olympics since the post-Yugoslav era.

== Athletics ==
Bosnian athletes have so far achieved qualifying standards in the following athletics events (up to a maximum of three athletes in each event at the 'A' Standard, and 1 at the 'B' Standard).

Key

- Note–Ranks given for track events are within the athlete's heat only
- Q = Qualified for the next round
- q = Qualified for the next round as a fastest loser or, in field events, by position without achieving the qualifying target
- NR = National record
- N/A = Round not applicable for the event
- Bye = Athlete not required to compete in round

Men

| Athlete | Event | Heat | | Semifinal | | Final | |
| Athlete | Event | Result | Rank | Result | Rank | Result | Rank |
|---|---|---|---|---|---|---|---|
| Jasmin Salihović | 800 m | 1:49.59 | 7 | did not advance | | | |

Women

| Athlete | Event | Heat | | Semifinal | | Final | |
| Athlete | Event | Result | Rank | Result | Rank | Result | Rank |
|---|---|---|---|---|---|---|---|
| Jasminka Guber | 1500 m | 4:17.75 | 11 | did not advance | | | |

== Canoeing ==
=== Slalom ===
Men

| Athlete | Event | Preliminary | | | | | | Semifinal | | Final | | | |
| Athlete | Event | Run 1 | Rank | Run 2 | Rank | Total | Rank | Time | Rank | Time | Rank | Total | Rank |
|---|---|---|---|---|---|---|---|---|---|---|---|---|---|
| Emir Šarganović | K-1 | 111.26 | 23 | 105.04 | 23 | 216.30 | 23 | did not advance | | | | | |

== Judo ==
Men

| Athlete | Event | Preliminary | Round of 32 | Round of 16 | Quarterfinals | Semifinals | Repechage 1 | Repechage 2 | Repechage 3 | Final / BM |
| Athlete | Event | Opposition Result | Opposition Result | Opposition Result | Opposition Result | Opposition Result | Opposition Result | Opposition Result | Opposition Result | Rank |
|---|---|---|---|---|---|---|---|---|---|---|
| Amel Mekić | Men's −100 kg | Inoue (JPN); L 0000–1010 | did not advance | | | | | | | |

== Shooting ==
Men

| Athlete | Event | Qualification | | Final | |
| Athlete | Event | Points | Rank | Points | Rank |
|---|---|---|---|---|---|
| Nedžad Fazlija | 10 m air rifle | 587 | =35 | did not advance | |
| Nedžad Fazlija | 50 m rifle prone | 585 | 44 | did not advance | |
| Nedžad Fazlija | 50 m rifle 3 positions | 1144 | =33 | did not advance | |

== Swimming ==
Men

| Athlete | Event | Heat | | Semifinal | | Final | |
| Athlete | Event | Time | Rank | Time | Rank | Time | Rank |
|---|---|---|---|---|---|---|---|
| Željko Panić | 100 m freestyle | 52.75 | 55 | did not advance | | | |

== Table tennis ==
Men

| Athlete | Event | Round 1 | Round 2 | Round 3 | Quarterfinals | Semifinals | Final / BM | |
| Athlete | Event | Opposition Result | Opposition Result | Opposition Result | Opposition Result | Opposition Result | Opposition Result | Rank |
|---|---|---|---|---|---|---|---|---|
| Srđan Miličević | Men's singles | Lavale (AUS); W 4–2 | Primorac (CRO); L 1–4 | did not advance | | | | |

== Taekwondo ==
Men

| Athlete | Event | Round of 16 | Quarterfinals | Semifinals | Repechage 1 | Repechage 2 | Final / BM | |
| Athlete | Event | Opposition Result | Opposition Result | Opposition Result | Opposition Result | Opposition Result | Opposition Result | Rank |
|---|---|---|---|---|---|---|---|---|
| Zoran Prerad | Men's +80 kg | García (ESP); L 2–13 | did not advance | | | | | |

== Tennis ==
Women

| Athlete | Event | Round of 64 | Round of 32 | Round of 16 | Quarterfinals | Semifinals | Final / BM | |
| Athlete | Event | Opposition Score | Opposition Score | Opposition Score | Opposition Score | Opposition Score | Opposition Score | Rank |
|---|---|---|---|---|---|---|---|---|
| Mervana Jugić-Salkić | Women's singles | Camerin (ITA); L 3–6, 4–6 | did not advance | | | | | |

== See also ==
- Bosnia and Herzegovina at the 2005 Mediterranean Games
