= Bosnia and Herzegovina at the 2016 Winter Youth Olympics =

- IOC code: BIH
- NOC: Olympic Committee of Bosnia and Herzegovina
- Website: www.okbih.ba

in Lillehammer
- Competitors: 5 in 3 sports
- Medals: Gold 0 Silver 0 Bronze 0 Total 0

Winter Youth Olympics appearances (overview)
- 2012; 2016; 2020; 2024

Bosnia and Herzegovina competed at the 2016 Winter Youth Olympics in Lillehammer, Norway from 12 to 21 February 2016. Five of its athletes participated in three sports but could not win any medals.

== Alpine skiing ==
Girls

Athlete	Event	Run 1		Run 2		Total	
Athlete	Event	Time	Rank	Time	Rank	Time	Rank
Elvedina Muzaferija	Slalom	59.13	21	DNS		DNF	
Elvedina Muzaferija	Giant slalom	1:24.58	23	did not finish			
Elvedina Muzaferija	Super-G	—				1:17.56	25
Elvedina Muzaferija	Combined	1:18.45	22	45.08	13	2:03.53	16

== Biathlon ==
Boys

Athlete	Event	Time	Misses	Rank
Boris Škipina	Sprint	24:13.4	5	47
Boris Škipina	Pursuit	43:51.0	11	49

Girls

Athlete	Event	Time	Misses	Rank
Teodora Đukić	Sprint	25:04.4	4	48
Teodora Đukić	Pursuit	42:28.9	11	48

== Cross-country skiing ==
Boys

Athlete	Event	Qualification		Quarterfinal		Semifinal		Final	
Athlete	Event	Time	Rank	Time	Rank	Time	Rank	Time	Rank
Milos Čolić	10 km freestyle	—						26:48.2	35
Milos Čolić	Classical sprint	3:47.93	46	did not advance					
Milos Čolić	Cross-country cross	3:30.11	37	—		did not advance			

Girls

Athlete	Event	Qualification		Quarterfinal		Semifinal		Final	
Athlete	Event	Time	Rank	Time	Rank	Time	Rank	Time	Rank
Katarina Bogdanović	5 km freestyle	—						15:51.1	37
Katarina Bogdanović	Classical sprint	4:25.53	40	did not advance					
Katarina Bogdanović	Cross-country cross	4:17.15	39	—		did not advance			

== See also ==
- Bosnia and Herzegovina at the 2016 Summer Olympics
