= Bosnia and Herzegovina at the 2012 Summer Olympics =

- IOC code: BIH
- NOC: Olympic Committee of Bosnia and Herzegovina
- Website: www.okbih.ba (in Bosnian, Serbian, and Croatian)

in London
- Competitors: 6 in 4 sports
- Flag bearers: Amel Mekić (opening); Kemal Mešić (closing)
- Medals: Gold 0 Silver 0 Bronze 0 Total 0

Summer Olympics appearances (overview)
- 1992; 1996; 2000; 2004; 2008; 2012; 2016; 2020; 2024

Other related appearances
- Yugoslavia (1920–1992 W)

Bosnia and Herzegovina competed at the 2012 Summer Olympics in London, United Kingdom from 27 July to 12 August 2012. This was the nation's sixth appearance at the Summer Olympics.

Olympic Committee of Bosnia and Herzegovina (OKBIH) sent a total of 6 athletes to the Games, 4 men and 2 women, to compete only in athletics, judo, shooting, and swimming. Bosnian athletes included Kenyan-born marathon runner Lucija Kimani, and rifle shooter Nedžad Fazlija, who participated at his fifth Olympic games without winning an Olympic medal. Heavyweight judoka Amel Mekić became the nation's flag bearer for the second time at the opening ceremony. Bosnia and Herzegovina, however, has yet to win its first Olympic medal as an independent nation.

== Athletics ==
Bosnian and Herzegovinian athletes have so far achieved qualifying standards in the following athletics events (up to a maximum of 3 athletes in each event at the 'A' Standard, and 1 at the 'B' Standard):

Key

- Note – Ranks given for track events are within the athlete's heat only
- Q = Qualified for the next round
- q = Qualified for the next round as a fastest loser or, in field events, by position without achieving the qualifying target
- NR = National record
- N/A = Round not applicable for the event
- Bye = Athlete not required to compete in round

Men

Athlete	Event	Qualification		Final	
Athlete	Event	Distance	Position	Distance	Position
Kemal Mešić	Shot put	19.60	24	Did not advance	

Women

Athlete	Event	Final	
Athlete	Event	Result	Rank
Lucija Kimani	Marathon	DNF	

== Judo ==
Men

Athlete	Event	Round of 32	Round of 16	Quarterfinals	Semifinals	Repechage	Final / BM	
Athlete	Event	Opposition Result	Opposition Result	Opposition Result	Opposition Result	Opposition Result	Opposition Result	Rank
Amel Mekić	Men's −100 kg	Hwang H-t (KOR); L 0002–0021	Did not advance					

== Shooting ==
Men

Athlete	Event	Qualification		Final	
Athlete	Event	Points	Rank	Points	Rank
Nedžad Fazlija	10 m air rifle	585	44	Did not advance	
Nedžad Fazlija	50 m rifle 3 positions	1149	38	Did not advance	
Nedžad Fazlija	50 m rifle prone	587	45	Did not advance	

== Swimming ==
Bosnian and Herzegovinian swimmers have so far achieved qualifying standards in the following events (up to a maximum of 2 swimmers in each event at the Olympic Qualifying Time (OQT), and 1 at the Olympic Selection Time (OST)):

Men

Athlete	Event	Heat		Semifinal		Final	
Athlete	Event	Time	Rank	Time	Rank	Time	Rank
Ensar Hajder	200 m individual medley	2:05.70	36	Did not advance			

Women

Athlete	Event	Heat		Semifinal		Final	
Athlete	Event	Time	Rank	Time	Rank	Time	Rank
Ivana Ninković	100 m breaststroke	1:14.04	41	Did not advance			

== See also ==
- Bosnia and Herzegovina at the 2012 Winter Youth Olympics
