= Bosnia and Herzegovina at the 2020 Winter Youth Olympics =

- IOC code: BIH
- NOC: Olympic Committee of Bosnia and Herzegovina
- Website: www.okbih.ba

in Lausanne
- Competitors: 9 in 4 sports
- Medals: Gold 0 Silver 0 Bronze 0 Total 0

Winter Youth Olympics appearances (overview)
- 2012; 2016; 2020; 2024

Bosnia and Herzegovina competed at the 2020 Winter Youth Olympics in Lausanne, Switzerland from 9 to 22 January 2020. Nine of its athletes participated in four sports but could not win any medals.

== Alpine skiing ==
Boys

Athlete	Event	Run 1		Run 2		Total	
Athlete	Event	Time	Rank	Time	Rank	Time	Rank
Alen Bičakčić	Giant slalom	1:15.09	51	1:14.06	45	2:29.15	46
Alen Bičakčić	Slalom	45.15	44	DNF			

Girls

Athlete	Event	Run 1		Run 2		Total	
Athlete	Event	Time	Rank	Time	Rank	Time	Rank
Esma Alić	Giant slalom	1:13.74	44	DNF			
Esma Alić	Slalom	DNF					

== Biathlon ==
Boys

Athlete	Event	Time	Misses	Rank
Uroš Lalović	Sprint	24:11.4	4 (1+3)	79
Uroš Lalović	Individual	45:37.6	10 (3+4+2+1)	90
Davor Škipina	Sprint	25:11.0	6 (3+3)	86
Davor Škipina	Individual	49:45.8	15 (3+4+2+1)	95
Aleksa Vuković	Sprint	DNF		
Aleksa Vuković	Individual	38:11.0	3 (2+0+1+0)	26

== Cross-country skiing ==
Boys

Athlete	Event	Qualification		Quarterfinal		Semifinal		Final	
Athlete	Event	Time	Rank	Time	Rank	Time	Rank	Time	Rank
Đorđe Santrač	10 km classic	—						36:17.3	74
Đorđe Santrač	Free sprint	4:06.17	75	did not advance					
Đorđe Santrač	Cross-country cross	5:12.98	71	—		did not advance			

Girls

Athlete	Event	Qualification		Quarterfinal		Semifinal		Final	
Athlete	Event	Time	Rank	Time	Rank	Time	Rank	Time	Rank
Vesna Pantić	5 km classic	—						24:02.5	75
Vesna Pantić	Free sprint	4:14.42	81	did not advance					
Vesna Pantić	Cross-country cross	7:51.94	79	—		did not advance			
Sara Plakalović	5 km classic	—						20:45.4	69
Sara Plakalović	Free sprint	3:26.64	66	did not advance					
Sara Plakalović	Cross-country cross	6:02.45	60	—		did not advance			

== Luge ==
Boys

Athlete	Event	Run 1		Run 2		Total	
Athlete	Event	Time	Rank	Time	Rank	Time	Rank
Hamza Pleho	Singles	56.334	22	56.303	18	1:52.637	21

== See also ==
- Bosnia and Herzegovina at the 2020 Summer Olympics
