= Bosnia and Herzegovina at the 1992 Summer Olympics =

- IOC code: BIH (BSH used at these Games)
- NOC: Olympic Committee of Bosnia and Herzegovina

in Barcelona
- Competitors: 10 in 6 sports
- Flag bearer: Zlatan Saračević
- Medals: Gold 0 Silver 0 Bronze 0 Total 0

Summer Olympics appearances (overview)
- 1992; 1996; 2000; 2004; 2008; 2012; 2016; 2020; 2024

Other related appearances
- Yugoslavia (1920–1992 W)

Bosnia and Herzegovina competed in the Summer Olympic Games as an independent nation for the first time at the 1992 Summer Olympics in Barcelona, Spain. Previously, Bosnian and Herzegovinian athletes competed for Yugoslavia at the Olympic Games.

== Competitors ==
The following is the list of number of competitors in the Games.

Sport	Men	Women	Total
Athletics	2	2	4
Canoeing	1	0	1
Judo	1	0	1
Shooting	0	1	1
Swimming	1	1	2
Weightlifting	1	–	1
Total	6	4	10

== Athletics ==
Men
Field events

Athlete	Event	Qualification		Final	
Athlete	Event	Distance	Position	Distance	Position
Zlatan Saračević	Shot put	16.38	24	did not advance	
Dragan Mustapić	Discus throw	48.80	29	did not advance	

Women
Track and Road Events

Athlete	Event	Round 1		Round 2		Semifinal		Final	
Athlete	Event	Result	Rank	Result	Rank	Result	Rank	Result	Rank
Mirsada Burić	3000 m	10:03.34	33	—N/a		did not advance			
Kada Delić	10 km walk	—N/a						55:24	38

== Canoeing ==
Sprint
Men

Athlete	Event	Heats		Repechages		Semifinals		Final	
Athlete	Event	Time	Rank	Time	Rank	Time	Rank	Time	Rank
Aleksandar Đurić	C-1 500 m	2:07.12	7 R	2:04.68	5	did not advance			

== Judo ==
Men

Athlete	Event	Qualification		Final	
Athlete	Event	Distance	Position	Distance	Position
Vlado Paradžik	Men's 60 kg				23

== Shooting ==
Women

Athlete	Event	Qualification		Final	
Athlete	Event	Distance	Position	Distance	Position
Mirjana Horvat	Women's 10 metre air rifle	393	6	491.6	8
Mirjana Horvat	Women's 50 metre rifle three positions	576	17	did not advance	

== Swimming ==
Men

Athlete	Event	Qualification		Final	
Athlete	Event	Distance	Position	Distance	Position
Janko Gojković	Men's 100 metre butterfly	56.81	44	did not advance	
Janko Gojković	Men's 200 metre butterfly	2:09.08	27	did not advance	

Women

Athlete	Event	Qualification		Final	
Athlete	Event	Distance	Position	Distance	Position
Anja Margetić	Women's 100 metre butterfly	1:06.26	44	did not advance	
Anja Margetić	Women's 200 metre butterfly	2:21.56	27	did not advance	

== Weightlifting ==
Men

Athlete	Event	Snatch		Clean & Jerk		Total	Rank
Athlete	Event	Result	Rank	Result	Rank	Total	Rank
Mehmed Skender	Men's 110 kg	140.0	23	180.0	20	320.0	20
