= Dmitry Maksimov =

Dmitry Maksimov may refer to:

- Dmitry Maksimov (runner) (born 1977), Russian long-distance runner
- Dmitry Maksimov (judoka) (born 1978), Russian judoka
