= Bosnia and Herzegovina at the Youth Olympics =

Performance of Bosnia and Herzegovina at the Youth Olympic Games

- IOC code: BIH
- NOC: Olympic Committee of Bosnia and Herzegovina
- Website: www.okbih.ba (in Bosnian)
- Medals Ranked 104th: Gold 0 Silver 1 Bronze 1 Total 2

Summer appearances
- 2010; 2014; 2018; 2026

Winter appearances
- 2012; 2016; 2020; 2024

Bosnia and Herzegovina has participated at the Youth Olympic Games in every edition since the inaugural 2010 Games and every edition after that.

== Medal tables ==
=== Medals by Summer Games ===
| Games | Athletes | Gold | Silver | Bronze | Total | Rank |
|---|---|---|---|---|---|---|
| 2010 Singapore | 5 | 0 | 0 | 1 | 1 | 84 |
| (China) 2014 Nanjing | 6 | 0 | 1 | 0 | 1 | 70 |
| (Argentina) 2018 Buenos Aires | 6 | 0 | 0 | 0 | 0 | - |
| (Senegal) 2026 Dakar | | | | | | |
| Total | | 0 | 1 | 1 | 2 | 94 |

=== Medals by Winter Games ===
| Games | Athletes | Gold | Silver | Bronze | Total | Rank |
|---|---|---|---|---|---|---|
| (Austria) 2012 Innsbruck | 4 | 0 | 0 | 0 | 0 | - |
| (Norway) 2016 Lillehammer | 5 | 0 | 0 | 0 | 0 | - |
| (Switzerland) 2020 Lausanne | 9 | 0 | 0 | 0 | 0 | - |
| (South Korea) 2024 Gangwon | 6 | 0 | 0 | 0 | 0 | - |
| Total | | 0 | 0 | 0 | 0 | - |

=== Medals by summer sport ===
| Sport | Gold | Silver | Bronze | Total |
|---|---|---|---|---|
| Judo | 0 | 1 | 0 | 1 |
| Tennis | 0 | 0 | 1 | 1 |
| Totals (2 entries) | 0 | 1 | 1 | 2 |

== List of medalists ==
=== Summer Games ===
| Medal | Name | Games | Sport | Event |
|---|---|---|---|---|
| Bronze | Damir Džumhur | 2010 Singapore | Tennis | Boys' singles |
| Silver | Aleksandra Samardžić | (China) 2014 Nanjing | Judo | Girls' 78 kg |

=== Summer Games medalists as part of Mixed-NOCs Team ===
| Medal | Name | Games | Sport | Event |
|---|---|---|---|---|
| Bronze | Eldin Omerović | 2010 Singapore | Judo | Mixed team |

== Flag bearers ==
| # | Games | Season | Flag bearer | Sport |
|---|---|---|---|---|
| 6 | 2020 Lausanne | Winter | Esma Alić; Hamza Pleho | Alpine skiing Luge |
| 5 | 2018 Buenos Aires | Summer | Emina Pašukan | Swimming |
| 4 | 2016 Lillehammer | Winter | | |
| 3 | 2014 Nanjing | Summer | Aleksandra Samardžić | Judo |
| 2 | 2012 Innsbruck | Winter | Kerim Catal | Luge |
| 1 | 2010 Singapore | Summer | Damir Džumhur | Tennis |

== See also ==
- Bosnia and Herzegovina at the Olympics
- Bosnia and Herzegovina at the Paralympics
