= Željko Petrović (runner) =

Bosnian long-distance runner (born 1969)

Personal information
- Nationality: Bosnian
- Born: 13 September 1969 (age 56) Prnjavor, Yugoslavia

Sport
- Sport: Long-distance running
- Event: Marathon

Achievements and titles
- Personal best: Marathon: 2:17:13

Željko Petrović (born 13 September 1969) is a Bosnian former long-distance runner. He competed for Bosnia and Herzegovina in the men's marathon at the 2000 Summer Olympics.

== Running career ==
Petrović began running in fifth grade of elementary school in the village of Banja Kulaši near Prnjavor. His parents would buy him large shoes in order to save money that would otherwise be spent changing shoe sizes over time. He was first scouted by coach Mladen Pavljak, who insisted on bringing Petrović to train in an organized program in Celje. However, after the start of the Yugoslav Wars, Petrović returned to Bosnia, where he continued running in Banja Luka and in Prnjavor during the Bosnian War.

Petrović and fellow countryman Đuro Kodžo both fulfilled the Olympic "B" standard at the 1999 Celje Marathon in Celje, Slovenia, with Petrović finishing in a time of 2:17:13.^{1} Although Petrović qualified for the 2000 Summer Olympics, Bosnia and Herzegovina was one of up to six countries which did not vaccinate their distance runners ahead of the marathon, and Petrović suffered from a 39 °C fever just two days before his race. His doctor recommended not to race, but Petrović insisted on racing at the Olympics, and finished in 76th place out of 81 finishers in the men's marathon at the 2000 Summer Olympics.

== Notes ==
- ^1 Result is formatted in hours:minutes:seconds
