= Bosnia and Herzegovina at the 2000 Summer Olympics =

- IOC code: BIH
- NOC: Olympic Committee of Bosnia and Herzegovina
- Website: www.okbih.ba (in Bosnian, Serbian, and Croatian)

in Sydney
- Competitors: 9 in 4 sports
- Flag bearer: Elvir Krehmić
- Medals: Gold 0 Silver 0 Bronze 0 Total 0

Summer Olympics appearances (overview)
- 1992; 1996; 2000; 2004; 2008; 2012; 2016; 2020; 2024; 2028

Other related appearances
- Yugoslavia (1920–1992 W)

Bosnia and Herzegovina competed at the 2000 Summer Olympics in Sydney, Australia.

== Athletics ==
Men
Track and Road Events

Athlete	Event	Final	
Athlete	Event	Result	Rank
Đuro Kodžo	Marathon	2:39:14	78
Željko Petrović	Marathon	2:38:29	76

Field Events

Athlete	Event	Qualification		Final	
Athlete	Event	Distance	Position	Distance	Position
Elvir Krehmić	High jump	2.24	=14	Did not advance	

Women
Track and Road Events

Athlete	Event	Heat		Quarterfinal		Semifinal		Final	
Athlete	Event	Result	Rank	Result	Rank	Result	Rank	Result	Rank
Dijana Kojić	400 m	55.61	7	Did not advance					

== Judo ==
Women

Athlete	Event	Round of 32	Round of 16	Quarterfinals	Semifinals	Repechage 1	Repechage 2	Repechage 3	Final / BM	
Athlete	Event	Opposition Result	Opposition Result	Opposition Result	Opposition Result	Opposition Result	Opposition Result	Opposition Result	Opposition Result	Rank
Arijana Jaha	Women's 52 kg	Devi (IND); L	Did not advance							

== Shooting ==
Men

Athlete	Event	Qualification		Final	
Athlete	Event	Points	Rank	Points	Rank
Nedžad Fazlija	Men's 10 m air rifle	591	8 Q	692.7	6
Nedžad Fazlija	Men's 50 m rifle prone	590	34	Did not advance	
Nedžad Fazlija	Men's 50 m rifle 3 positions	1132	41	Did not advance	
Zoran Novaković	Men's Trap	109	=23	Did not advance	

== Swimming ==
Men

Athlete	Event	Heat		Semifinal		Final	
Athlete	Event	Time	Rank	Time	Rank	Time	Rank
Janko Gojković	Men's 100 m butterfly	55.55 NR	=39	Did not advance			
Željko Panić	Men's 100 m freestyle	52.40	49	Did not advance			
