= Bosnia and Herzegovina at the 2024 Summer Olympics =

- IOC code: BIH
- NOC: Olympic Committee of Bosnia and Herzegovina
- Website: www.okbih.ba (in Bosnian, Serbian, and Croatian)

in Paris, France 26 July 2024 – 11 August 2024
- Competitors: 5 (2 men and 3 women) in 3 sports
- Flag bearers (opening): Mesud Pezer & Larisa Cerić
- Flag bearer (closing): Lana Pudar
- Medals: Gold 0 Silver 0 Bronze 0 Total 0

Summer Olympics appearances (overview)
- 1992; 1996; 2000; 2004; 2008; 2012; 2016; 2020; 2024

Other related appearances
- Yugoslavia (1920–1992 W)

Bosnia and Herzegovina competed at the 2024 Summer Olympics in Paris from 26 July to 11 August 2024. It was the nation's ninth consecutive appearance at the Summer Olympics as an independent nation.

Larisa Cerić fell short of her very first Olympic medal in Women's +78 Judo in the Repechage round to Bronze medalist Kim Ha-yun of South Korea, whereas other athletes failed to secure an Olympic medal finish.

== Competitors ==
The following is the list of the number of Bosnia and Herzegovina's competitors in the Games.

Sport	Men	Women	Total
Athletics	1	0	1
Judo	0	2	2
Swimming	1	1	2
Total	2	3	5

== Athletics ==
Bosnian track and field athletes achieved the entry standards for Paris 2024 by world ranking, in the following events (a maximum of 3 athletes each):

Key

- Note–Ranks given for track events are within the athlete's heat only
- Q = Qualified for the next round
- q = Qualified for the next round as the fastest loser or, in field events, by position without achieving the qualifying target
- NR = National record
- N/A = Round not applicable for the event
- Bye = Athlete not required to compete in round

Field events

Athlete	Event	Qualification		Final	
Athlete	Event	Result	Rank	Result	Rank
Mesud Pezer	Men's shot put	19.03	26	Did not advance	

== Judo ==
Athlete	Event	Round of 32	Round of 16	Quarterfinals	Semifinals	Repechage	Final / BM	
Athlete	Event	Opposition Result	Opposition Result	Opposition Result	Opposition Result	Opposition Result	Opposition Result	Rank
Aleksandra Samardžić	Women's –70 kg	Olsen (DEN); W 10–00	Dijke (NED); L 00–10	Did not advance				
Larisa Cerić	Women's +78 kg	Andrews (NZL); W 10–00	Nunes (POR); W 10–00	Dicko (FRA); L 00–10	Bye	Kim (KOR); L 00–01	Did not advance	

== Swimming ==
Bosnian swimmers achieved the entry standards in the following events for Paris 2024 (a maximum of two swimmers under the Olympic Qualifying Time (OST) and potentially at the Olympic Consideration Time (OCT)):

Athlete	Event	Heat		Semifinal		Final	
Athlete	Event	Time	Rank	Time	Rank	Time	Rank
Jovan Lekić	Men's 400 m freestyle	3:57.90	30	—N/a		Did not advance	
Lana Pudar	Women's 100 m butterfly	57.97	17	Did not advance			
Lana Pudar	Women's 200 m butterfly	2:09.32	12 Q	2:08.74	12	Did not advance	

== See also ==
- Bosnia and Herzegovina at the 2024 Winter Youth Olympics
