= Yhya Hasaba =

Syrian Olympic judoka

Personal information
- Full name: Yhya Hasaba
- Nationality: Syria
- Born: 5 January 1974 (age 52) Damascus, Syria
- Height: 1.80 m (5 ft 11 in)
- Weight: 100 kg (220 lb)

Sport
- Sport: Judo
- Event: 100 kg

Yhya Hasaba (Arabic: يحيى حسابا; born January 5, 1974, in Damascus) is a Syrian judoka, who competed in the men's half-heavyweight category. Hasaba qualified as a lone judoka for the Syrian team in the men's half-heavyweight class (100 kg) at the 2004 Summer Olympics in Athens, by granting a tripartite invitation from the International Judo Federation. He lost his opening match to U.S. judoka Rhadi Ferguson, who pulled him off a perfectly timed scoop throw (sukui nage) for an ippon to close the five-minute bout.
