= Bosnia and Herzegovina at the 2012 Winter Youth Olympics =

- IOC code: BIH
- NOC: Olympic Committee of Bosnia and Herzegovina
- Website: www.okbih.ba

in Innsbruck
- Competitors: 4 in 3 sports
- Flag bearer: Kerim Catal
- Medals: Gold 0 Silver 0 Bronze 0 Total 0

Winter Youth Olympics appearances (overview)
- 2012; 2016; 2020; 2024

Bosnia and Herzegovina competed at the 2012 Winter Youth Olympics in Innsbruck, Austria. The Bosnia and Herzegovina team consisted of 4 athletes in 3 sports. It did not win any medals.

== Alpine skiing ==
Bosnia and Herzegovina qualified one boy and one girl.

Boy

Athlete	Event	Final			
Athlete	Event	Run 1	Run 2	Total	Rank
Marko Sljivic	Slalom	47.38	DNF		
Marko Sljivic	Giant slalom	DNF			

Girl

Athlete	Event	Final			
Athlete	Event	Run 1	Run 2	Total	Rank
Nada Zvizdic	Slalom	51.33	44.09	1:35.42	20
Nada Zvizdic	Giant slalom	1:06.88	1:07.66	2:14.54	31

== Cross country skiing ==
Bosnia and Herzegovina qualified one boy.

Boy

Athlete	Event	Final	
Athlete	Event	Time	Rank
Goran Kosarac	10km classical	35:49.1	39

Sprint

Athlete	Event	Qualification		Quarterfinal		Semifinal		Final	
Athlete	Event	Total	Rank	Total	Rank	Total	Rank	Total	Rank
Goran Kosarac	Boys' sprint	1:56.05	38	did not advance					

== Luge ==
Bosnia and Herzegovina qualified one boy.

Boy

Athlete	Event	Final			
Athlete	Event	Run 1	Run 2	Total	Rank
Kerim Catal	Boys' Singles	41.354	41.279	1:22.633	24

== See also ==
- Bosnia and Herzegovina at the 2012 Summer Olympics
