= Bosnia and Herzegovina at the 1996 Summer Olympics =

- IOC code: BIH
- NOC: Olympic Committee of Bosnia and Herzegovina
- Website: www.okbih.ba (in Bosnian, Serbian, and Croatian)

in Atlanta
- Competitors: 9 in 7 sports
- Flag bearers: Fahrudin Hodžić (opening); Islam Đugum (closing)
- Medals: Gold 0 Silver 0 Bronze 0 Total 0

Summer Olympics appearances (overview)
- 1992; 1996; 2000; 2004; 2008; 2012; 2016; 2020; 2024

Other related appearances
- Yugoslavia (1920–1992 W)

Bosnia and Herzegovina competed at the 1996 Summer Olympics in Atlanta, United States.

== Athletics ==
Men
Track and Road Events

Athlete	Event	Final	
Athlete	Event	Result	Rank
Islam Đugum	Marathon	2:47:38	107

Women
Track and Road Events

Athlete	Event	Final	
Athlete	Event	Result	Rank
Kada Delić	10 km walk	48:47	38

== Canoeing ==
Slalom
Men

Athlete	Event	Final					
Athlete	Event	Run 1	Rank	Run 2	Rank	Total	Rank
Samir Karabašić	Men's K-1	248.01	41	196.85	32	196.85	41

== Judo ==
Men

Athlete	Event	Round of 64	Round of 32	Round of 16	Quarterfinal	Semifinal	Repechage 1	Repechage 2	Repechage 3	Final / BM	
Athlete	Event	Opposition Result	Opposition Result	Opposition Result	Opposition Result	Opposition Result	Opposition Result	Opposition Result	Opposition Result	Opposition Result	Rank
Davor Vlaškovac	Men's 71 kg	Golban (MDA); L	did not advance								

== Shooting ==
Men

Athlete	Event	Qualification		Final	
Athlete	Event	Distance	Position	Distance	Position
Nedžad Fazlija	Men's 10 m air rifle	586	25	did not advance	
Nedžad Fazlija	Men's 50 m rifle prone	583	51	did not advance	
Nedžad Fazlija	Men's 50 m rifle three positions	1163	18	did not advance	

== Swimming ==
Men

Athlete	Event	Qualification		Final	
Athlete	Event	Distance	Position	Distance	Position
Janko Gojković	100 m freestyle	51.28	36	did not advance	
Janko Gojković	100 m butterfly	56.11	41	did not advance	

Women

Athlete	Event	Qualification		Final	
Athlete	Event	Distance	Position	Distance	Position
Dijana Kvesić	200 m backstroke	2:23.78	32	did not advance	

== Table tennis ==
Men

Athlete	Event	Group round		Round of 16	Quarterfinals	Semifinals	Bronze medal	Final	
Athlete	Event	Opposition Result	Rank	Opposition Result	Opposition Result	Opposition Result	Opposition Result	Opposition Result	Rank
Tarik Hodžić	Men's singles	Group L Dmitry Mazunov (RUS); L 0 – 2 Peter Karlsson (SWE); L 0 – 2 Jim Butler (USA); L 0 – 2	4	did not advance					

== Wrestling ==
Men's Greco-Roman

Athlete	Event	Round 1	Round 2	Round 3	Round 4	Round 5	Round 6	Final / BM	
Athlete	Event	Opposition Result	Opposition Result	Opposition Result	Opposition Result	Opposition Result	Opposition Result	Opposition Result	Rank
Fahrudin Hodžić	−90 kg	Vyacheslav Oliynyk (UKR); L 0–12	Doug Cox (CAN); W 5–2	Derrick Waldroup (USA); L 0-12	did not advance				17
