= Bosnia and Herzegovina at the 2024 Winter Youth Olympics =

- Flag of Bosnia and Herzegovina
- IOC code: BIH
- NOC: Olympic Committee of Bosnia and Herzegovina

in Gangwon, South Korea 19 January 2024 – 1 February 2024
- Competitors: 6 in 3 sports
- Flag bearer (opening): Boris Stanojević & Ina Likić
- Flag bearer (closing): TBD
- Medals: Gold 0 Silver 0 Bronze 0 Total 0

Winter Youth Olympics appearances (overview)
- 2012; 2016; 2020; 2024

Bosnia and Herzegovina is scheduled to compete at the 2024 Winter Youth Olympics in Gangwon, South Korea, from January 19 to February 1, 2024, This will be Bosnia and Herzegovina's fourth appearance at the Winter Youth Olympic Games, having competed at every Games since the inaugural edition in 2012.

The Bosnia and Herzegovina consisted of six athletes (three per gender) competing in three sports. Biathlete and cross-country skier Boris Stanojević and alpine skier Ina Likić were the country's flagbearers during the opening ceremony.

== Competitors ==
The following is the list of number of competitors (per gender) participating at the games per sport/discipline.

Sport	Men	Women	Total
Alpine skiing	1	1	2
Biathlon	2	0	2
Cross-country skiing	1	2	3
Total	3	3	6

- Boris Stanojević competed in both biathlon and cross-country skiing.

== Alpine skiing ==
Bosnia and Herzegovina qualified two alpine skiers (one per gender).

Men

Athlete	Event	Run 1		Run 2		Total	
Athlete	Event	Time	Rank	Time	Rank	Time	Rank
Noah Miljković	Super-G	—				56.59	31
Noah Miljković	Giant slalom	DNF					
Noah Miljković	Slalom	DNF					
Noah Miljković	Combined	58.46	41	DNF			

Women

Athlete	Event	Run 1		Run 2		Total	
Athlete	Event	Time	Rank	Time	Rank	Time	Rank
Ina Likić	Giant slalom	55.14	35	58.79	29	1:53.93	30
Ina Likić	Slalom	DNF					

== Biathlon ==
Bosnia and Herzegovina qualified two male biathletes. Boris Stanojević also competed in cross-country skiing.

Men

Athlete	Event	Time	Misses	Rank
Srđan Lalović	Sprint	25:49.5	3 (1+2)	71
Srđan Lalović	Individual	Did not finish		
Boris Stanojević	Sprint	27:09.2	3 (0+3)	80
Boris Stanojević	Individual	52:32.2	10 (2+3+3+2)	75

== Cross-country skiing ==
Bosnia and Herzegovina qualified three cross-country skiers (one man and two women). Boris Stanojević also competed in biathlon.

Men

Athlete	Event	Qualification		Quarterfinal		Semifinal		Final	
Athlete	Event	Time	Rank	Time	Rank	Time	Rank	Time	Rank
Boris Stanojević	7.5 km classical	—						24:48.8	61
Boris Stanojević	Sprint freestyle	3:26.17	51	Did not advance					

Women

Athlete	Event	Qualification		Quarterfinal		Semifinal		Final	
Athlete	Event	Time	Rank	Time	Rank	Time	Rank	Time	Rank
Teodora Delipara	7.5 km classical	—						33:55.9	68
Teodora Delipara	Sprint freestyle	4:32.63	64	Did not advance					
Melika Jažić	7.5 km classical	—						36:52.1	69
Melika Jažić	Sprint freestyle	4:41.69	67	Did not advance					

== See also ==
- Bosnia and Herzegovina at the 2024 Summer Olympics
