= Judo at the 2008 Summer Olympics – Men's 100 kg =

Men's 100 kg at the Games of the XXIX Olympiad
- Venue: Beijing Science and Technology University Gymnasium
- Dates: 14 August 2008
- Winning score: 0120

Medalists
1st place, gold medalist(s)		Naidangiin Tüvshinbayar	Mongolia
2nd place, silver medalist(s)		Askhat Zhitkeyev	Kazakhstan
3rd place, bronze medalist(s)		Movlud Miraliyev	Azerbaijan
3rd place, bronze medalist(s)		Henk Grol	Netherlands

The men's 100 kg judo competition at the 2008 Summer Olympics was held on August 14 at the Beijing Science and Technology University Gymnasium. Preliminary rounds started at 12:00 pm CST. Repechage finals, semifinals, bouts for bronze medals and the final were held at 8:00 pm CST.

This event was the second-heaviest of the men's judo weight classes, limiting competitors to a maximum of 100 kilograms of body mass. Like all other judo events, bouts lasted five minutes. If the bout was still tied at the end, it was extended for another five-minute, sudden-death period; if neither judoka scored during that period, the match is decided by the judges. The tournament bracket consisted of a single-elimination contest culminating in a gold medal match. There was also a repechage to determine the winners of the two bronze medals. Each judoka who had lost to a semifinalist competed in the repechage. The two judokas who lost in the semifinals faced the winner of the opposite half of the bracket's repechage in bronze medal bouts.

== Qualifying athletes ==
Mat	Athlete	Country
1	Luciano Corrêa	Brazil
1	Henk Grol	Netherlands
1	Frederic Demontfaucon	France
1	Arik Zeevi	Israel
1	Eduardo Costa	Argentina
1	Zoltan Palkovacs	Slovakia
1	Shao Ning	China
1	Przemysław Matyjaszek	Poland
1	Arturo Martínez	Mexico
1	Frank Moussima	Cameroon
1	Daniel Hadfi	Hungary
1	Mohamed Ben Saleh	Libya
1	Amel Mekic	Bosnia and Herzegovina
1	Adler Volmar	United States
1	Askhat Zhitkeyev	Kazakhstan
1	Talal Al-Enezi	Kuwait
2	Peter Cousins	Great Britain
2	Levan Zhorzholiani	Georgia
2	Movlud Miraliyev	Azerbaijan
2	Hassane Azzoun	Algeria
2	Keith Morgan	Canada
2	Teofilo Diek	Dominican Republic
2	Utkir Kurbanov	Uzbekistan
2	Daniel Brata	Romania
2	Ruslan Gasimov	Russia
2	Benjamin Behrla	Germany
2	Keiji Suzuki	Japan
2	Naidangiin Tüvshinbayar	Mongolia
2	Albenis Antonio Rosales	Venezuela
2	Jang Sung-ho	South Korea
2	Oreydis Despaigne	Cuba
2	Matt Celotti	Australia

== Tournament results ==
=== Final ===
Final
1	Askhat Zhitkeyev (KAZ)	0010
2	Naidangiin Tüvshinbayar (MGL)	0120

=== Mat 1 ===
First round
Luciano Corrêa (BRA)	0001
Henk Grol (NED)	0210
Frederic Demontfaucon (FRA)	0001
Arik Zeevi (ISR)	0010
Eduardo Costa (ARG)	0110
Zoltan Palkovacs (SVK)	0100
Shao Ning (CHN)	0000
Przemysław Matyjaszek (POL)	1101
Arturo Martínez (MEX)	0001
Frank Moussima (CMR)	0100
Daniel Hadfi (HUN)	1001
Mohamed Ben Saleh (LBA)	0000
Amel Mekic (BIH)	0200
Adler Volmar (USA)	0000
Askhat Zhitkeyev (KAZ)	1110
Talal Al-Enezi (KUW)	0000

Round of 16
Henk Grol (NED)	0010
Arik Zeevi (ISR)	0001
Eduardo Costa (ARG)	0000
Przemysław Matyjaszek (POL)	1001
Frank Moussima (CMR)	0010
Daniel Hadfi (HUN)	1002
Amel Mekic (BIH)	0010
Askhat Zhitkeyev (KAZ)	1001

Quarterfinals
Henk Grol (NED)	1000
Przemysław Matyjaszek (POL)	0000
Daniel Hadfi (HUN)	0100
Askhat Zhitkeyev (KAZ)	1111

Semifinals
Henk Grol (NED)	0100
Askhat Zhitkeyev (KAZ)	1010

=== Mat 2 ===
First round
Peter Cousins (GBR)	0000
Levan Zhorzholiani (GEO)	0010
Movlud Miraliyev (AZE)	1000
Hassane Azzoun (ALG)	0001
Keith Morgan (CAN)	1001
Teofilo Diek (DOM)	0000
Utkir Kurbanov (UZB)	0001
Daniel Brata (ROU)	1000
Ruslan Gasimov (RUS)	0001
Benjamin Behrla (GER)	1100
Keiji Suzuki (JPN)	0000
Naidangiin Tüvshinbayar (MGL)	1000
Albenis Antonio Rosales (VEN)	0001
Jang Sung-ho (KOR)	1010
Oreydis Despaigne (CUB)	0010
Matt Celotti (AUS)	0000

Round of 16
Levan Zhorzholiani (GEO)	0000
Movlud Miraliyev (AZE)	1010
Keith Morgan (CAN)	0000
Daniel Brata (ROU)	1000
Benjamin Behrla (GER)	0001
Naidangiin Tüvshinbayar (MGL)	0021
Jang Sung-ho (KOR)	0001
Oreydis Despaigne (CUB)	0000

Quarterfinals
Movlud Miraliyev (AZE)	0110
Daniel Brata (ROU)	0000
Naidangiin Tüvshinbayar (MGL)	0011
Jang Sung-ho (KOR)	0010

Semifinals
Movlud Miraliyev (AZE)	0000
Naidangiin Tüvshinbayar (MGL)	0010

=== Repechage ===
First round
Corrêa (BRA)	0011
Zeevi (ISR)	0001
Al-Enezi (KUW)	0001
Mekic (BIH)	1100
Azzoun (ALG)	0001
Zhorzholiani (GEO)	1001
Suzuki (JPN)	0000
Behrla (GER)	1000

Second round
Matyjaszek (POL)	1000
Corrêa (BRA)	0000
Hadfi (HUN)	1001
Mekic (BIH)	0011
Brata (ROU)	0000
Zhorzholiani (GEO)	1001
Jang (KOR)	1000
Behrla (GER)	0000

Third round
Matyjaszek (POL)	0011
Hadfi (HUN)	0010
Zhorzholiani (GEO)	0021
Jang (KOR)	0020

Bronze medal finals
Miraliyev (AZE)	0110
Matyjaszek (POL)	0001
Grol (NED)	0020
Zhorzholiani (GEO)	0000
