= Biathlon at the 2024 Winter Youth Olympics – Single mixed relay =

Single mixed relay at the IV Winter Youth Olympic Games
- Venue: Alpensia Biathlon Centre
- Date: 21 January 2024
- Competitors: 60 from 30 nations
- Winning time: 44:08.2

Medalists
| 1st place, gold medalist(s) | | Alice Dusserre; Antonin Guy | France |
| 2nd place, silver medalist(s) | | Marie Keudel; Korbi Kübler | Germany |
| 3rd place, bronze medalist(s) | | Eiril Nordbø; Storm Veitsle | Norway |

The single mixed relay biathlon competition at the 2024 Winter Youth Olympics was held on 21 January 2024 at the Alpensia Biathlon Centre.

== Results ==
The race started at 11:00 and ended at 11:56

| Rank | Bib | Country | Time | Misses (Note: For every shooting bout, three spare rounds were available to use. Any additional misses would be penalised with a lap of a 150 m loop. Numbers before the plus signs refer to the number of laps taken, numbers after the plus signs refer to the number of spare rounds used.) | | Deficit |
| Rank | Bib | Country | Time | P | S | Deficit |
|---|---|---|---|---|---|---|
| 1st place, gold medalist(s) | 1 | France; Alice Dusserre; Antonin Guy; Alice Dusserre; Antonin Guy | 44:08.2; 10:38.1; 9:56.7; 10:36.9; 12:56.5 | 0+2; 0+0; 0+2; 0+0; 0+0 | 0+3; 0+2; 0+0; 0+0; 0+1 | |
| 2nd place, silver medalist(s) | 8 | Germany; Marie Keudel; Korbi Kübler; Marie Keudel; Korbi Kübler | 44:58.2; 11:25.1; 9:34.4; 11:16.3; 12:42.4 | 0+0; 0+0; 0+0; 0+0; 0+0 | 0+6; 0+2; 0+1; 0+1; 0+2 | +50.0 |
| 3rd place, bronze medalist(s) | 9 | Norway; Eiril Nordbø; Storm Veitsle; Eiril Nordbø; Storm Veitsle | 44:58.5; 11:15.3; 10:10.6; 10:57.6; 12:35.0 | 0+3; 0+2; 0+0; 0+1; 0+0 | 1+6; 0+1; 1+3; 0+1; 0+1 | +50.3 |
| 4 | 4 | Switzerland; Molly Kafka; Levin Kunz; Molly Kafka; Levin Kunz | 45:31.7; 11:06.3; 9:59.3; 11:22.5; 13:03.6 | 0+2; 0+1; 0+0; 0+1; 0+0 | 0+5; 0+1; 0+2; 0+1; 0+1 | +1:23.5 |
| 5 | 2 | Italy; Nayeli Mariotti Cavagnet; Hannes Bacher; Nayeli Mariotti Cavagnet; Hannes Bacher | 45:46.4; 10:43.1; 10:29.7; 11:15.3; 13:18.3 | 0+5; 0+1; 0+2; 0+2; 0+0 | 3+9; 0+1; 1+3; 0+2; 2+3 | +1:38.2 |
| 6 | 6 | Ukraine; Iryna Shevchenko; Oleksandr Bilanenko; Iryna Shevchenko; Oleksandr Bilanenko | 46:41.6; 10:55.7; 10:26.6; 11:31.4; 13:47.9 | 2+9; 0+2; 2+3; 0+3; 0+1 | 1+6; 0+1; 0+0; 0+2; 1+3 | +2:33.4 |
| 7 | 12 | Estonia; Anlourdees Veerpalu; Frederik Välbe; Anlourdees Veerpalu; Frederik Välbe | 46:53.4; 11:11.8; 10:21.1; 11:38.0; 13:42.5 | 0+3; 0+1; 0+1; 0+1; 0+0 | 0+6; 0+1; 0+2; 0+2; 0+1 | +2:45.2 |
| 8 | 5 | Czech Republic; Valerie Křížová; Jakub Neuhauser; Valerie Křížová; Jakub Neuhauser | 47:13.8; 11:13.2; 10:45.3; 10:56.9; 14:18.4 | 0+6; 0+0; 0+1; 0+2; 0+3 | 1+10; 0+3; 0+3; 0+1; 1+3 | +3:05.6 |
| 9 | 16 | Slovenia; Ela Sever; Jaka Pilar; Ela Sever; Jaka Pilar | 47:13.8; 11:26.2; 10:10.2; 11:35.0; 14:02.4 | 2+11; 0+3; 0+2; 1+3; 1+3 | 0+8; 0+3; 0+1; 0+3; 0+1 | +3:05.6 |
| 10 | 7 | Kazakhstan; Alema Karabayeva; Ilyas Khassenov; Alema Karabayeva; Ilyas Khassenov | 47:31.0; 12:14.5; 10:09.7; 11:59.7; 13:07.1 | 0+2; 0+1; 0+1; 0+0; 0+0 | 0+5; 0+2; 0+2; 0+1; 0+0 | +3:22.8 |
| 11 | 11 | Poland; Amelia Liszka; Grzegorz Galica; Amelia Liszka; Grzegorz Galica | 47:36.0; 11:12.1; 11:26.8; 12:06.5; 12:50.6 | 3+6; 0+0; 3+3; 0+2; 0+1 | 2+10; 0+2; 2+3; 0+3; 0+2 | +3:27.8 |
| 12 | 14 | Austria; Rosaly Stollberger; Simon Grasberger; Rosaly Stollberger; Simon Grasberger | 47:52.7; 11:07.5; 10:23.3; 12:16.8; 14:05.1 | 2+8; 0+0; 0+2; 1+3; 1+3 | 1+6; 0+0; 1+3; 0+1; 0+2 | +3:44.5 |
| 13 | 13 | Bulgaria; Raya Adzhamova; Georgi Dzhorgov; Raya Adzhamova; Georgi Dzhorgov | 48:40.9; 12:29.9; 10:14.6; 11:44.8; 14:11.6 | 1+8; 0+3; 0+2; 0+0; 1+3 | 0+5; 0+3; 0+0; 0+2; 0+0 | +4:32.7 |
| 14 | 23 | Australia; Ava McCann; Phoenix Sparke; Ava McCann; Phoenix Sparke | 48:45.3; 11:49.2; 11:20.6; 12:23.9; 13:11.6 | 1+8; 0+2; 1+3; 0+1; 0+2 | 1+7; 0+1; 1+3; 0+3; 0+0 | +4:37.1 |
| 15 | 15 | Finland; Eveliina Hakala; Akseli Kirjavainen; Eveliina Hakala; Akseli Kirjavainen | 48:53.7; 11:25.5; 10:54.4; 11:47.7; 14:46.1 | 1+10; 0+2; 0+3; 0+2; 1+3 | 1+8; 0+0; 1+3; 0+3; 0+2 | +4:45.5 |
| 16 | 17 | Romania; Krisztina Silló; Horia Urs; Krisztina Silló; Horia Urs | 49:12.8; 13:23.5; 10:02.6; 12:28.6; 13:18.1 | 1+7; 1+3; 0+1; 0+2; 0+1 | 1+6; 1+3; 0+1; 0+2; 0+0 | +5:04.6 |
| 17 | 24 | Croatia; Ema Sobol; Filip Crnić; Ema Sobol; Filip Crnić | 49:33.6; 12:00.3; 10:46.4; 12:25.7; 14:21.2 | 1+8; 0+2; 0+0; 0+3; 1+3 | 2+8; 0+1; 2+3; 0+1; 0+3 | +5:25.4 |
| 18 | 3 | Sweden; Maya Rennermalm; Anton Modigs; Maya Rennermalm; Anton Modigs | 49:49.0; 12:07.3; 10:17.3; 13:16.9; 14:07.5 | 1+9; 0+1; 0+2; 1+3; 0+3 | 1+9; 0+2; 0+1; 0+3; 1+3 | +5:40.8 |
| 19 | 22 | South Korea; Kim Hye-won; Cho Na-dan; Kim Hye-won; Cho Na-dan | 50:06.5; 11:43.3; 11:47.0; 11:53.2; 14:43.0 | 0+3; 0+0; 0+1; 0+1; 0+1 | 1+7; 0+2; 1+3; 0+0; 0+2 | +5:58.3 |
| 20 | 10 | Canada; Cheyenne Tirschmann; Luke Hulshof; Cheyenne Tirschmann; Luke Hulshof | 51:51.8; 11:13.8; 12:27.5; 12:39.9; 15:30.6 | 9+10; 0+1; 5+3; 3+3; 1+3 | 4+8; 0+2; 2+3; 0+0; 2+3 | +7:43.6 |
| 21 | 20 | Lithuania; Emilija Mincevič; Juozas Augustinavičius; Emilija Mincevič; Juozas Augustinavičius | 52:06.8; 13:28.6; 10:23.1; 12:31.8; 15:43.3 | 1+6; 0+1; 0+1; 0+0; 1+3 | 5+7; 2+3; 0+1; 0+0; 3+3 | +7:58.6 |
| 22 | 28 | Serbia; Hanna Braun; Abdulkerim Hodžić; Hanna Braun; Abdulkerim Hodžić | 52:12.4; 12:10.8; 10:46.7; 12:35.3; 16:39.6 | 4+7; 0+1; 0+0; 0+3; 4+3 | 0+9; 0+3; 0+2; 0+1; 0+3 | +8:04.2 |
| 23 | 21 | Latvia; Madara Veckalniņa; Adrians Šņoriņš; Madara Veckalniņa; Adrians Šņoriņš | 52:51.2; 12:55.1; 11:16.4; 12:45.9; 15:53.8 | 4+9; 0+2; 0+3; 0+1; 4+3 | 2+9; 2+3; 0+2; 0+2; 0+2 | +8:43.0 |
| 24 | 29 | Hungary; Laura Bozóki; László Kúnos; Laura Bozóki; László Kúnos | 53:09.6; 12:27.5; 12:05.6; 12:38.6; 15:57.9 | 1+9; 0+2; 0+3; 0+1; 1+3 | 1+6; 0+1; 1+3; 0+1; 0+1 | +9:01.4 |
| 25 | 30 | Great Britain; Josie Clifford; Graham Benson; Josie Clifford; Graham Benson | 53:23.1; 12:12.5; 11:04.3; 13:50.0; 16:16.3 | 1+6; 0+0; 0+0; 0+3; 1+3 | 5+12; 0+3; 1+3; 1+3; 3+3 | +9:14.9 |
| 26 | 26 | Spain; Cristina Lanau; Rodrigo Azabal; Cristina Lanau; Rodrigo Azabal | 53:23.5; 13:19.4; 11:31.3; 14:59.8; 13:33.0 | 3+9; 0+0; 2+3; 1+3; 0+3 | 7+10; 2+3; 1+3; 4+3; 0+1 | +9:15.3 |
| 27 | 19 | Slovakia; Alžbeta Garguláková; Markus Sklenárik; Alžbeta Garguláková; Markus Sklenárik | 53:42.0; 18:00.2; 10:32.5; 11:40.6; 13:28.7 | 2+7; 2+2; 0+1; 0+2; 0+1 | 3+5; 3+1; 0+3; 0+1; 0+0 | +9:33.8 |
| 28 | 18 | United States; Emily Campbell; Elias Soule; Emily Campbell; Elias Soule | 54:10.8; 15:11.9; 10:52.5; 14:23.7; 13:42.7 | 5+10; 3+3; 0+2; 2+3; 0+2 | 1+5; 1+3; 0+0; 0+2; 0+0 | +10:02.6 |
| 29 | 27 | Moldova; Arina Rusu; Dinu Belevac; Arina Rusu; Dinu Belevac | 55:29.4; 12:56.1; 12:23.1; 13:49.5; 16:20.7 | 0+7; 0+2; 0+1; 0+1; 0+3 | 3+11; 0+2; 2+3; 1+3; 0+3 | +11:21.2 |
| 30 | 25 | Greece; Aikaterini Vaikou; Vasileios Rosenlis; Aikaterini Vaikou; Vasileios Rosenlis | LAP; 14:29.5; 13:24.5 | 1+3; 2+3; 2+3 | 0+3; 0+3; 0+3 | |
