= Talal Al-Enezi =

Kuwaiti judoka

Personal information
- Nationality: Kuwait
- Born: 28 December 1985 (age 40)
- Height: 1.80 m (5 ft 11 in)
- Weight: 94 kg (207 lb)

Sport
- Sport: Judo
- Event: 100 kg

Talal Al-Enezi (Arabic: طلال العنزي; born December 28, 1985) is a Kuwaiti judoka, who played for the half-heavyweight category. Al-Enezi represented Kuwait at the 2008 Summer Olympics in Beijing, where he competed for the men's half-heavyweight class (100 kg). He lost his first preliminary match by an ippon and a hane goshi (spring hip throw) to Kazakhstan's Askhat Zhitkeyev. Because his opponent advanced further into the final, Al-Enezi offered another shot for the bronze medal by entering the repechage rounds. He was defeated in his first match by Bosnia and Herzegovina's Amel Mekić, who successfully scored an ippon and a tani otoshi (valley drop), at three minutes and thirty-four seconds.
