= Barry Kirk Jackman =

American judoka

Personal information
- Full name: Barry Kirk Jackman
- Nationality: Barbadian
- Born: March 16, 1981 (age 45) Brooklyn, New York, U.S.
- Height: 1.96 m (6 ft 5 in)
- Weight: 99 kg (218 lb)

Sport
- Sport: Judo
- Event: 100 kg
- Club: Starrett Judo Club
- Coached by: Ian Waithers, Parnel Legros

Barry Kirk Jackman (born March 16, 1981, in Brooklyn, New York, United States) is a Barbadian judoka, who competed in the men's half-heavyweight category. He attained a seventh-place finish in the 100-kg division at the 2003 Pan American Games in Santo Domingo, Dominican Republic, and represented his nation Barbados at the 2004 Summer Olympics. Jackman is also a full-fledged member of Starrett Judo Club in Brooklyn, New York, and the Barbados Olympic squad, under head coach Ian Waithers.

Jackman qualified as a lone judoka for the Barbadian team in the men's half-heavyweight class (100 kg) at the 2004 Summer Olympics in Athens, by granting a tripartite invitation from the International Judo Federation. He lost his opening match to Australia's Martin Kelly, who performed an uki waza (floating drop) to crush him on the tatami for an ippon victory at one minute and forty-two seconds. Jackman won nine national judo championships.

Jackman frequently participated in cricket matches in Massachusetts after his judo career.
