= Nedim Nišić =

Bosnian American Olympic swimmer (born 1984)

Personal information
- Born: March 7, 1984 (age 42) Tuzla, SR Bosnia and Herzegovina

Sport
- Sport: Swimming
- Strokes: Backstroke, butterfly, medley
- College team: Cleveland State University

Nedim Nišić (born March 7, 1984) is a Bosnian American Olympic swimmer.

He was a member of Bosnian Olympic team at the 2008 Summer Olympics in Beijing, China. He graduated from Cleveland State University, in Cleveland, Ohio. He currently lives in Cleveland.

== Swimming career ==
=== High school ===
Nedim was a national team member at the 2003 Long Course World Championships, 2004 Long Course European Championships, 2003 Short Course European Championships and the 2005 Mediterranean Games. He was a multiple national qualifier and finalist and earned medalist honors at several international competitions. He was the best Bosnian swimmer during the years 2004–2008. He is still the owner of numerous records in Bosnia and Herzegovina.

=== College ===
Nedim quickly established himself as a top swimmer, making record times in his freshman year. He swam the third leg on the 400 medley and 800 free relay teams that placed first at the Horizon League Championships. He placed fourth in the 100 fly with a team-best time of 49.86 at the league meet and also placed fourth in the 200 fly with a time of 1:53.55. His posted team-best time in the 200 fly is 1:50.76 against UIC. He added the team's second-fastest times in the 200 IM with a time of 1:52.69 and the 400 IM at 4:11.67.

In this second year, Nedim recorded Cleveland State University's top-times in the 100 butterfly 49.64, the 200 butterfly 1:52.08 and the 100 backstroke 50.78. He finished second in the 100 butterfly, third in the 100 backstroke and eighth in the 200 butterfly at the Horizon League Championships. He swam the backstroke leg of the league championship 200 and 400 medley relay teams and claimed 10 individual wins during the season.

== Family ==
Nedim is the son of Muris and Aida Nišić. He has a brother, Emir, basketball player, former national Under 16 team member.
