= Parnel Legros =

Haitian judoka

Personal information
- Born: 11 November 1956 (age 70)
- Occupation: Judoka

Sport
- Sport: Judo

Profile at external databases
- JudoInside.com: 10649

Parnel Legros (also spelled Parnell, born 11 November 1956) is a former Olympic level judoka for the nation of Haiti.

== Martial arts ==
Legros competed in the 1992 Summer Olympics in Barcelona. He competed in the Half Heavyweight division (95 kg), finishing 21st.

== Coaching ==
From 1993 to 2002, 1500 students passed through his judo program at Starett City. Legros for a period ran the largest judo program in the northeast.

He won the Real Judo award for Coach of the Year in 2002. Legros received the Sloan Public Service Award from Mayor Rudy Giuliani as a result of his success with youth in judo. 100% of his judo students went on to college.

Legros has been a clinician for the USJF.

He was a speaker at the funeral of Rena Kanakogi.

Legros works as a gym teacher at Intermediate School 364. He was noted as a teacher who made an attempt to save the life of a student, who died after playing football.

== Notable students ==
- Barry Kirk Jackman
- Dariusz Mikolajczak - 2008 Olympic Trials Bronze Medalist.
- Harry St. Leger
- Garry St. Leger

== See also ==
- Haiti at the 1992 Summer Olympics
