= Zoltán Pálkovács =

Slovak judo fighter

Personal information
- Born: 6 August 1981
- Died: 25 September 2010 (aged 29)
- Occupation: Judoka

Sport
- Country: Slovakia
- Sport: Judo
- Weight class: –100 kg
- League: Austrian Bundesliga
- Team: Noricum Leibnitz

Achievements and titles
- Olympic Games: R32 (2004, 2008)
- World Champ.: 9th (2003, 2007)
- European Champ.: 5th (2002, 2004)
Medal record
Men's judo
Representing Slovakia
European Junior Championships
Silver medal – second place	1999 Rome	–100 kg
Bronze medal – third place	2000 Nicosia	–100 kg

Profile at external databases
- IJF: 2552
- JudoInside.com: 11168
- Updated on 17 February 2022

Zoltán Pálkovács (Slovak: [ˈzɔltaːm ˈpaːlkɔʋatʂ]; Hungarian: [ˈzoltaːn ˈpaːlkovaːt͡ʃ]; August 6, 1981 – September 25, 2010) was a Slovak judoka of Hungarian ethnicity. He was born in Rimavská Sobota. Zoltán died in a traffic accident in Vienna. He was in a car as a passenger, he was not driving.

== Achievements ==
Year	Tournament	Place	Weight class
2004	European Judo Championships	5th	Half heavyweight (100 kg)
2002	European Judo Championships	5th	Half heavyweight (100 kg)
