= Albenis Rosales =

Venezuelan judoka

Personal information
- Full name: Albenis Antonio Rosales
- Nationality: Venezuela
- Born: 18 March 1983 (age 43)
- Height: 1.70 m (5 ft 7 in)
- Weight: 100 kg (220 lb)

Sport
- Sport: Judo
- Event: 100 kg
Medal record
Men's judo
Representing Venezuela
Pan American Judo Championships
Bronze medal – third place	2008 Miami	100 kg

Albenis Antonio Rosales (born March 18, 1983) is a Venezuelan judoka, who played in the half-heavyweight category. He won a bronze medal for his division at the 2008 Pan American Judo Championships in Miami, Florida.

Rosales made his official debut for the 2008 Summer Olympics in Beijing, where he competed in the men's half-heavyweight class (100 kg). He lost his first preliminary match by an ippon and a tani otoshi (valley drop) to Olympic silver medalist Jang Sung-ho of South Korea.
