= Bosnia and Herzegovina at the 2020 Summer Olympics =

- IOC code: BIH
- NOC: Olympic Committee of Bosnia and Herzegovina
- Website: www.okbih.ba (in Bosnian, Serbian, and Croatian)

in Tokyo, Japan July 23, 2021 – August 8, 2021
- Competitors: 7 in 5 sports
- Flag bearers (opening): Larisa Cerić; Amel Tuka
- Flag bearer (closing): Amel Tuka
- Medals: Gold 0 Silver 0 Bronze 0 Total 0

Summer Olympics appearances (overview)
- 1992; 1996; 2000; 2004; 2008; 2012; 2016; 2020; 2024

Other related appearances
- Yugoslavia (1920–1992 W)

Bosnia and Herzegovina competed at the 2020 Summer Olympics in Tokyo. Originally scheduled to take place from 24 July to 9 August 2020, the Games were postponed to 23 July to 8 August 2021, because of the COVID-19 pandemic. It was the nation's eighth consecutive appearance at the Summer Olympics.

These were the most successful Olympic Games for Bosnia and Herzegovina thus far, who for the first time ever had more than one athlete place among the ten best in their categories, with Nedžad Husić finishing fifth, Amel Tuka finishing sixth, and Larisa Cerić finishing ninth. Also close to finishing in the top ten was Mesud Pezer, who placed eleventh. Despite these improvements, however, Bosnia and Herzegovina still failed to secure a single medal in the 2020 Summer Olympics.

== Competitors ==
The following is the list of number of Bosnia and Herzegovina's competitors in the Games.

Sport	Men	Women	Total
Athletics	2	0	2
Judo	0	1	1
Shooting	0	1	1
Swimming	1	1	2
Taekwondo	1	0	1
Total	4	3	7

== Athletics ==
Bosnian athletes further achieved the entry standards, either by qualifying time or by world ranking, in the following track and field events (up to a maximum of 3 athletes in each event):

Key

- Note–Ranks given for track events are within the athlete's heat only
- Q = Qualified for the next round
- q = Qualified for the next round as a fastest loser or, in field events, by position without achieving the qualifying target
- NR = National record
- N/A = Round not applicable for the event
- Bye = Athlete not required to compete in round

Track & road events

Athlete	Event	Heat		Semifinal		Final	
Athlete	Event	Result	Rank	Result	Rank	Result	Rank
Amel Tuka	Men's 800 m	1:45.48	2 Q	1:44.53	2 Q	1:45.98	6

Field events

Athlete	Event	Qualification		Final	
Athlete	Event	Distance	Position	Distance	Position
Mesud Pezer	Men's shot put	21.33	3 Q	20.08	11

== Judo ==
Bosnia and Herzegovina entered one female judoka into the Olympic tournament based on the International Judo Federation Olympics Individual Ranking.

Athlete	Event	Round of 32	Round of 16	Quarterfinals	Semifinals	Repechage	Final / BM	
Athlete	Event	Opposition Result	Opposition Result	Opposition Result	Opposition Result	Opposition Result	Opposition Result	Rank
Larisa Cerić	Women's +78 kg	Marenco (NCA); W 10–00	Kindzerska (AZE); L 00–10	Did not advance				

== Shooting ==
Bosnia and Herzegovina received an invitation from the ISSF to send a female air rifle shooter to the Olympics, based on her minimum qualifying score (MQS) attained on or before June 5, 2021.

Athlete	Event	Qualification		Final	
Athlete	Event	Points	Rank	Points	Rank
Tatjana Đekanović	Women's 10 m air rifle	613.2	47	Did not advance	

== Swimming ==
Bosnian swimmers further achieved qualifying standards in the following events (up to a maximum of 2 swimmers in each event at the Olympic Qualifying Time (OQT), and potentially 1 at the Olympic Selection Time (OST)):

Athlete	Event	Heat		Semifinal		Final	
Athlete	Event	Time	Rank	Time	Rank	Time	Rank
Emir Muratović	Men's 50 m freestyle	22.91	42	Did not advance			
Emir Muratović	Men's 100 m freestyle	50.43	45	Did not advance			
Lana Pudar	Women's 100 m butterfly	58.32	19	Did not advance			

== Taekwondo ==
Bosnia and Herzegovina entered one athlete into the taekwondo competition at the Games for the first time since 2004. Nedžad Husić secured a spot in the men's lightweight category (68 kg) with a top two finish at the 2021 European Qualification Tournament in Sofia, Bulgaria.

Athlete	Event	Round of 16	Quarterfinals	Semifinals	Repechage	Final / BM	
Athlete	Event	Opposition Result	Opposition Result	Opposition Result	Opposition Result	Opposition Result	Rank
Nedžad Husić	Men's −68 kg	Suzuki (JPN); W 22–2	Wael (EGY); W 8–7	Rashitov (UZB); L 5–28 PTG	Bye	Reçber (TUR); L 13–22	5

== See also ==
- Bosnia and Herzegovina at the 2020 Summer Paralympics
