= Bosnia and Herzegovina at the 2016 Summer Olympics =

- IOC code: BIH
- NOC: Olympic Committee of Bosnia and Herzegovina
- Website: www.okbih.ba (in Bosnian, Serbian, and Croatian)

in Rio de Janeiro
- Competitors: 11 in 5 sports
- Flag bearer: Amel Tuka (opening & closing)
- Medals: Gold 0 Silver 0 Bronze 0 Total 0

Summer Olympics appearances (overview)
- 1992; 1996; 2000; 2004; 2008; 2012; 2016; 2020; 2024

Other related appearances
- Yugoslavia (1920–1992 W)

Bosnia and Herzegovina competed at the 2016 Summer Olympics in Rio de Janeiro, Brazil, from 5 to 21 August 2016. This was the nation's seventh consecutive appearance at the Summer Olympics.

The Olympic Committee of Bosnia and Herzegovina (OKBIH) sent the nation's largest ever delegation to the Games. A total of 11 athletes, 7 men and 4 women, were selected to the team across five different sports (athletics, judo, shooting, swimming, and tennis).

== Athletics ==
Bosnian athletes have achieved qualifying standards in the following athletics events (up to a maximum of 3 athletes in each event):

Key

- Note–Ranks given for track events are within the athlete's heat only
- Q = Qualified for the next round
- q = Qualified for the next round as a fastest loser or, in field events, by position without achieving the qualifying target
- NR = National record
- N/A = Round not applicable for the event
- Bye = Athlete not required to compete in round

Men
Track & road events

Athlete	Event	Heat		Semifinal		Final	
Athlete	Event	Result	Rank	Result	Rank	Result	Rank
Amel Tuka	800 m	1:45.72	2 Q	1:45.24	4	Did not advance	

Field events

Athlete	Event	Qualification		Final	
Athlete	Event	Distance	Position	Distance	Position
Hamza Alić	Shot put	19.48	26	Did not advance	
Kemal Mešić	Shot put	18.78	30	Did not advance	
Mesud Pezer	Shot put	19.55	24	Did not advance	

Women
Track & road events

Athlete	Event	Final	
Athlete	Event	Result	Rank
Lucija Kimani	Marathon	2:58:22	116

== Judo ==
Bosnia & Herzegovina has qualified one judoka for the women's heavyweight category (+78 kg) at the Games. Larisa Cerić was ranked among the top 14 eligible judokas for women in the IJF World Ranking List of 30 May 2016.

Women

Athlete	Event	Round of 32	Round of 16	Quarterfinals	Semifinals	Repechage	Final / BM	
Athlete	Event	Opposition Result	Opposition Result	Opposition Result	Opposition Result	Opposition Result	Opposition Result	Rank
Larisa Cerić	+78 kg	Bye	Chikhrouhou (TUN); L 000–000 S	Did not advance				

== Shooting ==
Bosnia and Herzegovina has received an invitation from the Tripartite Commission to send a women's 10 m air rifle shooter to the Olympics.

Women

Athlete	Event	Qualification		Final	
Athlete	Event	Points	Rank	Points	Rank
Tatjana Đekanović	10 m air rifle	410.8	35	Did not advance	

Qualification Legend: Q = Qualify for the next round; q = Qualify for the bronze medal (shotgun)

== Swimming ==
Bosnia and Herzegovina has received a Universality invitation from FINA to send two swimmers (one male and one female) to the Olympics.

Men

Athlete	Event	Heat		Semifinal		Final	
Athlete	Event	Time	Rank	Time	Rank	Time	Rank
Mihajlo Čeprkalo	1500 m freestyle	15:31.62	37	—		Did not advance	

Women

Athlete	Event	Heat		Semifinal		Final	
Athlete	Event	Time	Rank	Time	Rank	Time	Rank
Amina Kajtaz	100 m butterfly	1:01.67	36	Did not advance			

== Tennis ==
Bosnia and Herzegovina has received an invitation from the Tripartite Commission to send 2010 Youth Olympic bronze medalist Damir Džumhur (world no. 87) in the men's singles into the Olympic tennis tournament, signifying the nation's return to the sport for the first time since 2004.

On 19 July 2016, Džumhur was confirmed as a direct entrant to the men's singles, due to the withdrawal of several tennis players from the Games. Hence, his invitation was transferred to fellow player Mirza Bašić (world no. 130).

Men

Athlete	Event	Round of 64	Round of 32	Round of 16	Quarterfinals	Semifinals	Final / BM	
Athlete	Event	Opposition Score	Opposition Score	Opposition Score	Opposition Score	Opposition Score	Opposition Score	Rank
Mirza Bašić	Men's singles	Mónaco (ARG); L 2–6, 2–6	Did not advance					
Damir Džumhur	Men's singles	Sela (ISR); L 4–6, 4–6	Did not advance					

== See also ==
- Bosnia and Herzegovina at the 2016 Summer Paralympics
