= Matt Celotti =

Australian Olympic judoka

Personal information
- Full name: Matthew Celotti
- Nationality: Australia
- Born: 9 July 1979 (age 47) Melbourne, Victoria, Australia
- Height: 1.85 m (6 ft 1 in)
- Weight: 103 kg (227 lb)

Sport
- Sport: Judo
- Event: 100 kg
- Club: Victorian Judo Academy

Matthew Celotti (born 9 July 1979 in Melbourne, Victoria) is an Australian judoka, who played for the half-heavyweight category. Started out his sporting career at the age of eight, Celotti had earned four titles in the same weight division (2000, 2001, 2003, and 2007) at the Australian Judo Championships.

Celotti represented Australia at the 2008 Summer Olympics in Beijing, where he competed for the men's half-heavyweight class (100 kg). He lost his first preliminary match to Cuba's Oreidis Despaigne, who successfully scored a yuko, and an ōuchi gari (big inner reap), at the end of the five-minute period. Shortly after the Olympics, Celotti immediately left Beijing for Melbourne to face criminal and assault charges of intentionally causing injury over an incident at Lower Plenty Hotel. The following year, he pleaded guilty to an unlawful assault, but avoided a jail term, after he was fined $1,200 to the Heidelberg Magistrates' Court.
