= Ramón Ayala (judoka) =

Puerto Rican Olympic judoka

Ramón Ayala OLY
Personal information
- Full name: Ramón Ayala
- Nationality: Puerto Rico
- Born: 15 August 1979 (age 46) San Juan, Puerto Rico
- Height: 1.88 m (6 ft 2 in)
- Weight: 99 kg (218 lb)

Sport
- Sport: Judo
- Event: 100 kg

Ramón Ayala (born August 15, 1979) is a Puerto Rican judoka who competed in the men's half-heavyweight category. He picked up two silver medals in the 100-kg division at the Pan American Championships (2001 and 2003), attained a fifth-place finish at the 2003 Pan American Games in Santo Domingo, Dominican Republic, and represented his nation Puerto Rico at the 2004 Summer Olympics.

Ayala qualified for the Puerto Rican squad in the men's half-heavyweight class (100 kg) at the 2004 Summer Olympics in Athens, by granting a tripartite invitation from the International Judo Federation. Ayala received a bye in the first round, before losing to his next opponent Sami Belgroun of Algeria by an ippon and an inner-thigh throw (uchi mata) three minutes and five seconds into his opening match.
