= Biathlon at the 2024 Winter Youth Olympics – Men's individual =

Men's individual at the IV Winter Youth Olympic Games
- Venue: Alpensia Biathlon Centre
- Date: 20 January 2024
- Competitors: 100 from 36 nations
- Winning time: 41:45.2

Medalists
1st place, gold medalist(s)		Antonin Guy	France
2nd place, silver medalist(s)		Storm Veitsle	Norway
3rd place, bronze medalist(s)		Markus Sklenárik	Slovakia

The men's 12.5 km individual biathlon competition at the 2024 Winter Youth Olympics will be held on 20 January 2024 at the Alpensia Biathlon Centre.

== Results ==
The race was started at 14:00.

Rank	Bib	Name	Country	Time	Penalties (P+S)	Deficit
1st place, gold medalist(s)	89	Antonin Guy	France	41:45.2	3 (1+1+0+1)	
2nd place, silver medalist(s)	25	Storm Veitsle	Norway	42:25.5	3 (2+0+1+0)	+40.3
3rd place, bronze medalist(s)	58	Markus Sklenárik	Slovakia	43:01.5	1 (1+0+0+0)	+1:16.3
4	55	Georgi Dzhorgov	Bulgaria	43:42.6	3 (1+1+1+0)	+1:57.4
5	59	Luke Hulshof	Canada	43:48.0	2 (0+0+0+2)	+2:02.8
6	91	Tov Røysland	Norway	43:51.8	4 (0+1+1+2)	+2:06.6
7	33	Björn Hederich	Germany	43:56.1	3 (0+1+0+2)	+2:10.9
8	3	Hannes Bacher	Italy	43:59.1	7 (2+3+1+1)	+2:13.9
9	49	Korbinian Kübler	Germany	44:13.5	5 (0+0+3+2)	+2:28.3
10	22	Michal Adamov	Slovakia	44:13.6	6 (0+3+0+3)	+2:28.4
11	97	Clément Pirès	France	44:14.4	5 (3+0+2+0)	+2:29.2
12	2	Frederik Välbe	Estonia	44:21.0	2 (1+1+0+0)	+2:35.8
13	90	Finn Zurnieden	Germany	44:39.8	4 (1+2+0+1)	+2:54.6
14	41	Camille Grataloup Manissolle	France	44:49.1	7 (0+2+2+3)	+3:03.9
15	30	Jaka Pilar	Slovenia	44:52.1	4 (2+0+2+0)	+3:06.9
16	61	Anton Modigs	Sweden	45:01.6	3 (1+0+0+2)	+3:16.4
17	64	Grzegorz Galica	Poland	45:30.8	8 (2+1+2+3)	+3:45.6
18	1	Filip Crnić	Croatia	45:34.9	6 (1+1+1+3)	+3:49.7
19	12	Dmytro Kriukov	Ukraine	45:36.6	4 (1+0+2+1)	+3:51.4
20	63	Cho Na-dan	South Korea	45:40.3	2 (1+0+1+0)	+3:55.1
21	19	Flavio Guy	France	45:48.2	9 (2+2+1+4)	+4:03.2
22	40	Ole Gebhardt	Norway	45:54.4	6 (1+0+3+2)	+4:09.2
23	80	Kirill Zotov	Kazakhstan	45:55.0	3 (1+1+0+1)	+4:09.8
24	37	Oleksandr Bilanenko	Ukraine	46:08.0	6 (2+1+1+2)	+4:22.8
25	23	Horia Urs	Romania	46:11.2	5 (0+3+0+2)	+4:26.0
26	86	Manuel Contoz	Italy	46:25.5	6 (2+3+1+0)	+4:40.3
27	69	Sebastián Belicaj	Slovakia	46:37.2	4 (0+3+1+0)	+4:52.0
28	78	Levin Kunz	Switzerland	46:47.0	6 (2+3+1+0)	+5:01.8
29	44	Michel Deval	Italy	46:50.2	6 (1+3+1+1)	+5:05.0
30	72	Simon Hechenberger	Austria	47:04.5	4 (0+1+2+1)	+5:19.3
31	47	Elias Soule	United States	47:23.7	5 (0+0+2+3)	+5:38.5
32	77	Veselin Belchinski	Bulgaria	47:31.4	6 (2+2+1+1)	+5:46.2
33	10	Juozas Augustinavičius	Lithuania	47:40.9	5 (1+1+2+1)	+5:55.7
34	6	Simon Grasberger	Austria	47:45.6	7 (1+3+0+3)	+6:00.4
35	68	John Lohuis	United States	47:55.6	6 (2+3+0+1)	+6:10.4
36	24	Akseli Kirjavainen	Finland	47:59.5	6 (0+3+0+3)	+6:14.3
37	4	František Jelínek	Czech Republic	48:01.4	6 (0+2+2+2)	+6:16.2
38	62	Dragoș Bărbieru	Romania	48:08.3	7 (2+1+1+3)	+6:23.1
39	54	Phoenix Sparke	Australia	48:13.5	8 (0+3+3+2)	+6:28.3
40	34	Adrians Šņoriņš	Latvia	48:14.9	6 (2+1+1+2)	+6:29.7
41	96	Matthäus Schönaigner	Austria	48:16.1	9 (4+2+2+1)	+6:30.9
42	17	Ilyas Khassenov	Kazakhstan	48:19.7	7 (2+0+1+4)	+6:34.5
43	70	Lukas Tannheimer	Germany	48:25.4	8 (1+1+4+2)	+6:40.2
44	28	Justin Konoff	Canada	48:26.3	7 (0+2+3+2)	+6:41.1
45	48	Jakub Neuhauser	Czech Republic	48:30.4	7 (1+2+1+3)	+6:45.2
46	20	Nikolay Nikolov	Bulgaria	48:32.2	9 (3+4+1+1)	+6:47.0
47	74	Sigurd Lehn	Norway	48:38.9	9 (1+4+0+4)	+6:53.7
48	7	Noa Kam-Magruder	United States	48:39.1	7 (1+2+1+3)	+6:53.9
49	95	Jan Dufek	Czech Republic	48:43.9	7 (3+2+2+0)	+6:58.7
50	53	Björn Niederhauser	Switzerland	48:45.4	6 (1+2+0+3)	+7:00.2
51	99	Arvid Trofast	Sweden	48:58.4	8 (0+4+2+2)	+7:13.2
52	52	Kaapo Saarinen	Finland	48:59.4	6 (2+3+0+1)	+7:14.2
53	67	Lukáš Kulhánek	Czech Republic	49:03.2	9 (0+5+0+4)	+7:18.0
54	94	Pablo Baselgia	Switzerland	49:12.8	7 (1+2+4+0)	+7:27.6
55	39	Rodrigo Azabal	Spain	49:31.8	11 (3+3+1+4)	+7:46.6
56	45	Magnus Steiner	Austria	49:37.9	9 (1+2+3+3)	+7:52.7
57	79	Ivan Steblyna	Ukraine	49:49.2	8 (3+3+2+0)	+8:04.0
58	16	Olle Gedda	Sweden	50:02.1	10 (0+4+3+3)	+8:16.9
59	13	Graham Benson	Great Britain	50:07.8	7 (3+0+3+1)	+8:22.6
60	65	Igor Kusztal	Poland	50:08.8	6 (3+0+1+2)	+8:23.6
61	71	Thijn Omblets	Sweden	50:11.6	6 (1+2+1+2)	+8:26.4
62	92	Eemil Koskinen	Finland	50:14.0	9 (3+3+2+1)	+8:28.8
63	98	Oleksandr Holik	Ukraine	50:18.2	6 (0+1+3+2)	+8:33.0
64	75	Valters Bresme	Latvia	50:39.8	8 (2+2+4+0)	+8:54.6
65	100	Antonio Pertile	Italy	50:48.1	8 (1+0+2+5)	+9:02.9
66	85	Arttu Remes	Finland	51:05.3	10 (3+2+2+3)	+9:20.1
67	27	Olivers Bresme	Latvia	51:27.8	9 (2+2+3+2)	+9:42.6
68	87	Park Min-yong	South Korea	51:37.9	8 (2+1+1+4)	+9:52.7
69	35	Daniel Buchovskij	Lithuania	51:38.7	9 (2+3+2+2)	+9:53.5
70	73	Dawson Ferguson	Canada	51:51.6	7 (3+1+1+2)	+10:06.4
71	81	Oskar Orupõld	Estonia	51:53.3	9 (1+5+3+0)	+10:08.1
72	51	Anton Redkin	Kazakhstan	52:00.3	9 (3+3+0+3)	+10:15.1
73	83	Nejc Einhauer	Slovenia	52:15.6	9 (4+1+2+2)	+10:30.4
74	43	Tom Smith	Great Britain	52:22.5	11 (4+3+1+3)	+10:37.3
75	31	Boris Stanojević	Bosnia and Herzegovina	52:32.2	10 (2+3+3+2)	+10:47.0
76	9	Sukhbat Borkhuu	Mongolia	52:40.1	11 (2+2+4+3)	+10:54.9
77	93	Michał Szułczyński	Poland	52:43.3	6 (1+1+1+3)	+10:58.1
78	84	Hunor Udvari	Romania	52:43.9	5 (0+2+1+2)	+10:58.7
79	26	Yanis Dumaz	Switzerland	53:12.0	12 (3+3+3+3)	+11:26.8
80	36	Temuujin Byambadorj	Mongolia	53:32.3	6 (0+2+2+2)	+11:47.1
81	88	Ignas Rakštelis	Lithuania	53:35.1	7 (2+3+1+1)	+11:49.9
82	21	Abdulkerim Hodžić	Serbia	54:05.0	8 (3+0+3+2)	+12:19.8
83	8	Dinu Belevac	Moldova	54:22.9	8 (4+1+1+2)	+12:37.7
84	11	Hwang Tae-ryeong	South Korea	54:35.2	8 (1+2+14)	+12:50.0
85	38	Ioannis Anastasiadis	Greece	55:34.9	9 (2+3+1+3)	+13:49.7
86	15	Vasileios Rosenlis	Greece	55.43.9	9 (1+3+4+1)	+13:58.7
87	5	Artur Saparbekov	Kyrgyzstan	55:44.1	9 (2+2+4+1)	+13:58.9
88	18	Edward Woodhouse-Bedak	Australia	55:54.2	12 (4+3+2+3)	+14:09.0
89	29	László Kúnos	Hungary	56:27.9	8 (3+1+1+3)	+14:42.7
90	14	Blagoja Najdenoski	North Macedonia	56:39.5	9 (2+2+4+1)	+14:54.3
91	42	Matija Naglić	Croatia	56:46.1	7 (1+4+1+1)	+15:00.9
92	76	Amarsanaa Turtogtokh	Mongolia	57:15.8	10 (5+2+2+1)	+15:30.6
93	32	Thanakorn Ngoeichai	Thailand	57:32.6	11 (3+3+3+2)	+15:47.4
94	60	Vladislav Maistrov	Moldova	58:40.7	7 (3+2+1+1)	+16:55.5
95	82	Matthew Wilby	Australia	58:46.2	6 (2+2+1+1)	+17:01.0
96	57	Baxter Pollard	New Zealand	1:05:01.7	16 (4+5+3+4)	+23:16.5
97	66	Antonios Prodromidis	Greece	1:07:43.2	14 (4+3+3+4)	+25:58.0
	46	Gregor Rupnik	Slovenia	Did not finish		
	56	Srđan Lalović	Bosnia and Herzegovina	Did not finish		
	50	Daniel Varikov	Estonia	Did not start		
