= Andrés Loforte =

Argentinian Olympic judoka

Personal information
- Full name: Andrés Alejandro Loforte
- Born: 25 July 1979 (age 46) Córdoba, Argentina
- Height: 1.85 m (6 ft 1 in)
- Weight: 100 kg (220 lb)

Sport
- Country: Argentina
- Sport: Judo
- Event: 100 kg

Andrés Alejandro Loforte (born 25 July 1979) is an Argentine judoka, who competed in the men's half-heavyweight category. He held a 2002 Argentine senior title for his own division, picked up a total of fourteen medals in his career, including three bronze from the Pan American Judo Championships, and also represented his nation Argentina at the 2004 Summer Olympics.

Loforte qualified for the Argentine squad in the men's half-heavyweight class (100 kg) at the 2004 Summer Olympics in Athens, by placing third and receiving a berth from the Pan American Championships in Margarita Island, Venezuela. He conceded with a koka score and a shido penalty, and succumbed to a kuchiki taoshi hold from Egypt's Bassel El Gharbawy during their opening match.
