= Arturo Martínez (judoka) =

Mexican judoka (born 1982)

Personal information
- Born: October 11, 1982 (age 42); Mexico City, Mexico

Sport
- Sport: Judo

Arturo Esteban Martínez Rivera (born October 11, 1982) is a male judoka from Mexico. He participated in the 2008 Summer Olympics.
