= Adler Volmar =

Olympic athlete and United States Navy sailor

Personal information
- Nationality: Haitian; American
- Born: March 5, 1977 (age 48); Miami, Florida, United States

Sport
- Country: United States
- Sport: Men's judo
- Coached by: Jhonny Prado, German Velazco

Adler Volmar (born March 5, 1977) is a Haitian-American fourth-degree black belt judoka. A dual citizen, he competed for Haiti at the 1996 Summer Olympics and for the United States at the 2008 Summer Olympics.

== Early life and career in Haiti ==
Volmar was born in Miami, Florida, on March 5, 1977, while his mother Yolette was visiting that city from her home in Cap-Haïtien, Haiti. Shortly after his birth, he and his mother returned to Haiti, where they lived a prosperous life. Volmar's father was a land owner and small businessman; the family ran a home improvement store. His father was also a veteran of the Haitian military and a former driver for dictator François Duvalier. Volmar's parents divorced by the time he was thirteen.

In 1990, after losing a fight at school, Volmar began taking self-defense lessons at the Union Judo Club in Cap-Haïtien under the tutelage of Leandre Innocent. He was an apt student and earned a black belt after only two years. At age seventeen, his mother sent him to live with his aunts in the United States because of political turmoil in Haiti. Because he was born in the United States, he held U.S. citizenship and was able to travel there at a time when other Haitians were being denied visas. He began competing in the United States and internationally.

Volmar competed for his home country, Haiti, at the 1996 Summer Olympics in Atlanta, Georgia. He was Haiti's flag bearer at the opening ceremony. Competing in the half-middleweight class (78 kg), he was given a bye in the first round and lost in the second round to Flávio Canto of Brazil.

== Career in the United States ==
While living with an aunt in Fort Lauderdale, Florida, in 1998, Volmar received a letter from the Selective Service System notifying him that he must register with the system. Not yet fluent in English, he misunderstood and thought that he was obligated to serve in the military. After speaking with a recruiter who told him of the military's sports programs, Volmar enlisted in the United States Navy. His military service offered an excuse to ask the Haitian sport authorities for release, freeing him to compete for the United States. Volmar was trained as a combat medic and taught classes in self-defense at Naval Station Newport in Rhode Island. After work, he would drive ninety-eight miles to train at a judo club run by Jimmy Pedro in Lawrence, Massachusetts.

Eventually, Volmar was admitted to the Navy's sports program and began competing again. He finished seventh at the January 2003 Jigoro Kano Cup in Japan and was hoping to qualify for the 2004 Summer Olympics, until tearing two ligaments in his right knee at a training camp in Poland. He healed enough to compete at the Olympic trials, but failed to qualify for the summer games. He left the Navy as a petty officer at the end of his term of service in 2006.

Volmar continued to train and participate in United States and international competitions. By January 2008, he was a member of the United States national judo team and was preparing for the 2008 Summer Olympic trials under coach German Velazco. Working out with teammate Anthony Turner that month, Volmar executed a throw which caused Turner to land on Volmar's left knee. With torn cartilage and two torn ligaments in his left knee, Volmar's chances to qualify for the Olympics were again in doubt. After surgery to repair the knee on February 5, he began vigorous rehabilitation to regain his strength. He started full training workouts two weeks before the June 13 trials and competed in El Salvador one week before the trials. Despite his injury, he was still expected to win the 100 kg (220 pound) weight class based on his performance throughout the previous year.

At the Olympic trials in Las Vegas, Nevada, Volmar lost his first fight to Brian Picklo. Because of Volmar's long-standing number one ranking, a rematch was granted. The two would compete in a best-of-three series, with the winner earning a spot on the Olympic team. Volmar won the first match and Picklo won the second in overtime. The third fight also went to overtime and ended with a throw by Picklo which Volmar countered. Both opponents thought they had won the final point. After reviewing video of the move, officials decided that the winning point should go to Volmar. As winner of the best-of-three series, he qualified for the United States Olympic team. He competed in the Beijing games in the 100 kg (220 pound) weight class, but was knocked out in the first round after a loss to Amel Mekić of Bosnia and Herzegovina.

Volmar lives in Coral Springs, Florida, with his wife Crystal and their three children.
