= Moldova at the 2024 Winter Youth Olympics =

- Flag of Moldova
- IOC code: MDA
- NOC: National Olympic Committee of the Republic of Moldova

in Gangwon, South Korea 19 January 2024 – 1 February 2024
- Competitors: 5 in 2 sports
- Flag bearers (opening): Dinu Belevac & Arina Rusu
- Flag bearer (closing): TBD
- Medals: Gold 0 Silver 0 Bronze 0 Total 0

Winter Youth Olympics appearances
- 2012; 2016; 2020; 2024

Moldova competed at the 2024 Winter Youth Olympics in Gangwon, South Korea, from January 19 to February 1, 2024. This was Moldova's fourth appearance at the Winter Youth Olympic Games, having competed at every Games since the inaugural edition in 2012.

The Moldovan team consisted of 5 athletes (3 men and 2 women) competing in 2 sports. Biathletes Dinu Belevac and Arina Rusu were the country's flagbearers during the opening ceremony.

== Competitors ==
The following is the list of number of competitors (per gender) participating at the games per sport/discipline.

Sport	Men	Women	Total
Biathlon	2	1	3
Cross-country skiing	1	1	2
Total	3	2	5

== Biathlon ==
Moldova qualified three biathletes (two men and one woman).

Men

Athlete	Event	Time	Misses	Rank
Dinu Belevac	Sprint	24:51.7	1 (0+1)	56
Dinu Belevac	Individual	54:22.9	8 (4+1+1+2)	83
Vladislav Maistrov	Sprint	28:57.5	4 (1+3)	90
Vladislav Maistrov	Individual	58:40.7	7 (3+2+1+1)	94

Women

Athlete	Event	Time	Misses	Rank
Arina Rusu	Sprint	27:29.8	5 (1+4)	75
Arina Rusu	Individual	47:08.8	5 (2+1+0+2)	69

Mixed

Athletes	Event	Time	Misses	Rank
Arina Rusu; Dinu Belevac	Single mixed relay	55:29.4	3+19	29

== Cross-country skiing ==
Moldova qualified two cross-country skiers (one per gender).

Men

Athlete	Event	Qualification		Quarterfinal		Semifinal		Final	
Athlete	Event	Time	Rank	Time	Rank	Time	Rank	Time	Rank
Mihail Carpov	7.5 km classical	—N/a						21:13.1	28
Mihail Carpov	Sprint freestyle	3:19.82	40	Did not advance					

Women

Athlete	Event	Qualification		Quarterfinal		Semifinal		Final	
Athlete	Event	Time	Rank	Time	Rank	Time	Rank	Time	Rank
Emilia Sainciuc	7.5 km classical	—N/a						40:46.7	75
Emilia Sainciuc	Sprint freestyle	4:44.19	70	Did not advance					

== See also ==
- Moldova at the 2024 Summer Olympics
