= Michael Jurack =

German judoka (born 1979)

Personal information
- Born: 14 February 1979 (age 47) Straubing, West Germany
- Occupation: Judoka

Sport
- Country: Germany
- Sport: Judo
- Weight class: –100 kg

Achievements and titles
- Olympic Games: (bronze) (2004)
- World Champ.: 7th (2003)
- European Champ.: 5th (2004)
Medal record
Men's judo
Representing Germany
Olympic Games
Bronze medal – third place	2004 Athens	‍–‍100 kg
World Juniors Championships
Bronze medal – third place	1998 Cali	‍–‍100 kg

Profile at external databases
- IJF: 53044
- JudoInside.com: 246
- Updated on 30 May 2023

Michael Jurack (born 14 February 1979 in Straubing) is a German judoka.

He won a bronze medal in the half-heavyweight (100 kg) division at the 2004 Summer Olympics.

== Achievements ==
Year	Tournament	Place	Weight class
2004	Olympic Games	3rd	Half heavyweight (100 kg)
2004	European Judo Championships	5th	Half heavyweight (100 kg)
2003	World Judo Championships	7th	Half heavyweight (100 kg)
