= Timo Peltola =

Finnish judoka

Personal information
- Born: 12 June 1972 (age 54)
- Occupation: Judoka

Sport
- Sport: Judo

Profile at external databases
- JudoInside.com: 2382

Timo Hannu Tapani Peltola (born 12 June 1972) is a Finnish judoka.

== Achievements ==
Year	Tournament	Place	Weight class
2001	European Judo Championships	5th	Half heavyweight (100 kg)
1998	European Judo Championships	7th	Half heavyweight (100 kg)
