= Daniel Brata =

Romanian judoka

Personal information
- Born: 29 February 1984 (age 42)
- Occupation: Judoka

Sport
- Country: Romania
- Sport: Judo
- Weight class: –100 kg

Achievements and titles
- Olympic Games: 9th (2008)
- World Champ.: R32 (2005, 2010)
- European Champ.: (bronze) (2005, 2009)
Medal record
Men's judo
Representing Romania
European Championships
Bronze medal – third place	2005 Rotterdam	–100 kg
Bronze medal – third place	2009 Tbilisi	–100 kg
IJF Grand Slam
Bronze medal – third place	2009 Paris	–100 kg
IJF Grand Prix
Bronze medal – third place	2009 Hamburg	–100 kg
Bronze medal – third place	2009 Abu Dhabi	–100 kg
Bronze medal – third place	2011 Baku	–100 kg
European U23 Championships
Bronze medal – third place	2004 Ljubljana	–90 kg

Profile at external databases
- IJF: 374
- JudoInside.com: 14244
- Updated on 16 November 2022

Daniel Brata (born 29 December 1984) is a Romanian judoka.

== Achievements ==
Year	Tournament	Place	Weight class
2009	European Judo Championships	3rd	Half heavyweight (100 kg)
2005	European Judo Championships	3rd	Half heavyweight (100 kg)
