= Przemysław Matyjaszek =

Polish judoka

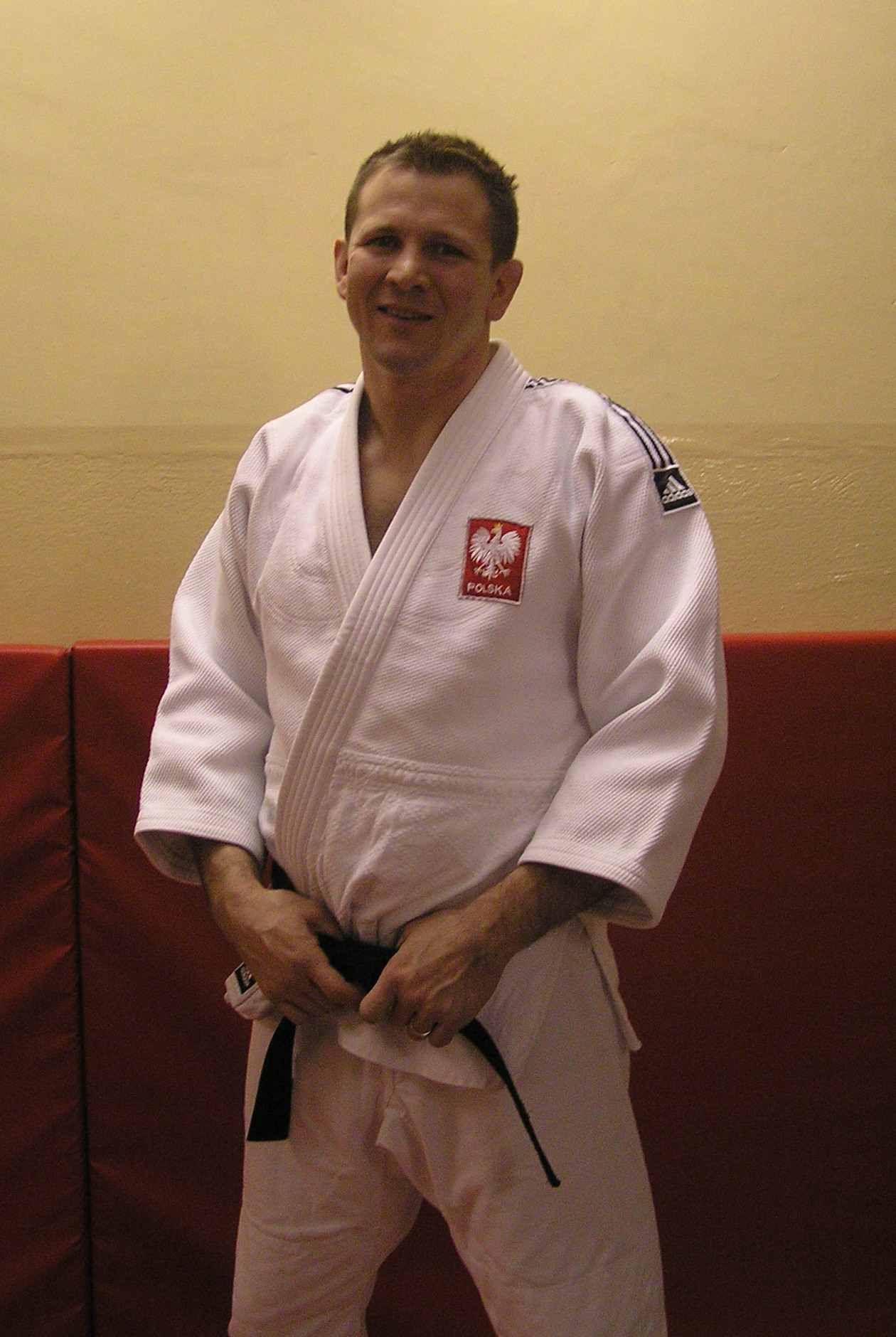
- Przemysław Matyjaszek, December 2012, Training at the UKS Dwójka Judo Tarnowskie Góry club

Personal information
- Born: 24 April 1978 (age 48) Ruda Śląska, Poland
- Occupation: Judoka

Sport
- Country: Poland
- Sport: Judo
- Weight class: –100 kg

Achievements and titles
- Olympic Games: 5th (2008)
- World Champ.: 13th (2001)
- European Champ.: (silver) (2008)
Medal record
Men's judo
Representing Poland
European Championships
Silver medal – second place	2008 Lisbon	–100 kg
Bronze medal – third place	2007 Warsaw	Open
World Juniors Championships
Silver medal – second place	1996 Porto	–86 kg
European Junior Championships
Bronze medal – third place	1997 Ljubljana	–86 kg

Profile at external databases
- IJF: 752
- JudoInside.com: 1142
- Updated on 16 November 2022

Przemysław Matyjaszek (born April 24, 1978, in Ruda Śląska) is a Polish judoka.

He competed at the Olympic Games in the 90 kg event in 2004 and in the 100 kg event in 2008.

== Achievements ==
Year	Tournament	Place	Weight class
2008	European Championships	2nd	Half heavyweight (100 kg)
2007	Jigoro Kano Cup	2nd	Half heavyweight (100 kg)
2007	European Open Championships	3rd	Open class
2005	World Championships	5th	Middleweight (90 kg)
2001	European Championships	5th	Middleweight (90 kg)
