= Markus Sklenárik =

Slovak biathlete (born 2007)

Personal information
- Born: 2 March 2007 (age 19) Revúca, Slovakia

Sport
- Country: Slovakia

Professional information
- Sport: Biathlon
Medal record
Men's biathlon
Representing Slovakia
Youth World Championships
Gold medal – first place	2026 Arber	Sprint
Youth Winter Olympics
Bronze medal – third place	2024 Gangwon	Individual

Markus Sklenárik (born 2 March 2007) is a Slovak biathlete. He won the Youth World Championships sprint event in 2026. He also was the bronze medalist in the men's individual event at the 2024 Youth Winter Olympics in Gangwon.

== Biathlon results ==
All results are sourced from the International Biathlon Union.

=== Youth and Junior World Championships ===
1 medal

Year	Age	Individual	Sprint	Mass Start	Relay	Mixed relay
(Estonia) 2024 Otepää	16	47th	42th	34th	13th	—
(Sweden) 2025 Östersund	17	57th	13th	54th	15th	22nd
(Germany) 2026 Arber	18	5th	Gold	29th	4th	5th
