= Đuro Kodžo =

Bosnian long-distance runner

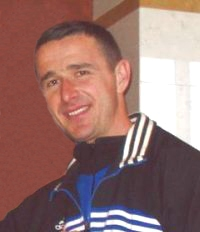
- Kodžo in 2007

Personal information
- Born: 12 May 1971 (age 55) Bjelajce, Yugoslavia

Sport
- Country: Bosnia and Herzegovina
- Sport: Long-distance running
- Event: Marathon

Achievements and titles
- Personal best(s): 5000m: 14:59.54; Marathon: 2:16:45

Đuro Kodžo (Serbian Cyrillic: Ђуро Коџо; born 12 May 1971) is a Bosnian retired long-distance runner who specialized in the marathon. He represented Bosnia and Herzegovina at the 2000 Summer Olympics and 2001 World Championships in Athletics. He holds a national record in the half-marathon discipline.

== Running career ==
Kodžo began training in Mrkonjić Grad with Atletski Klub "Petar Mrkonjić". By the end of his career, he would be named "Best Athlete of Mrkonjić Grad", a once-per-year recognition, on nine occasions. In the men's marathon at the 2000 Summer Olympics, Kodžo finished in 78th place out of 81 finishers in a time of 2:39:14 (hours:minutes:seconds). In the following year, he finished the men's marathon at the 2001 World Championships in Athletics in a personal-best time of 2:35:47. He also won the 2001 Podgorica Marathon in 2:30:11.

On 15 June 2003 he ran a personal best time of 1:05:45 in Rijeka's Run Reebok Trophy half marathon. However, the course was not approved for record keeping according to the Association of Road Racing Statisticians. Less than a year later, he ran 1:06:18 at the 2004 Belgrade Half Marathon, which was his best half marathon performance on a certified course.

On 5 October 2008 Kodžo ran his fastest marathon at the 2008 Zagreb Marathon, recording a personal-best time of 2:16:45. Kodžo qualified for the 2009 World Championships in Athletics for the marathon, but the selector for Bosnia and Herzegovina's Athletic Federation, Nebojša Matijević, refused to call up Kodžo from unclear reasons, resulting in a controversy.

== See also ==
- Bosnia and Herzegovina at the 2000 Summer Olympics
