= Vassilios Iliadis =

Greek judoka (born 1981)

Vassilios Iliadis (born 18 September 1981) is a Greek judoka and sambist.

== Achievements ==
Year	Tournament	Place	Weight class
2001	European Judo Championships	7th	Heavyweight (+100 kg)
2012	World Sambo Championships	2nd	Heavyweight (+100 kg)
