= Ariel Ze'evi =

Israeli judoka (born 1977)

Arik Ze'evi
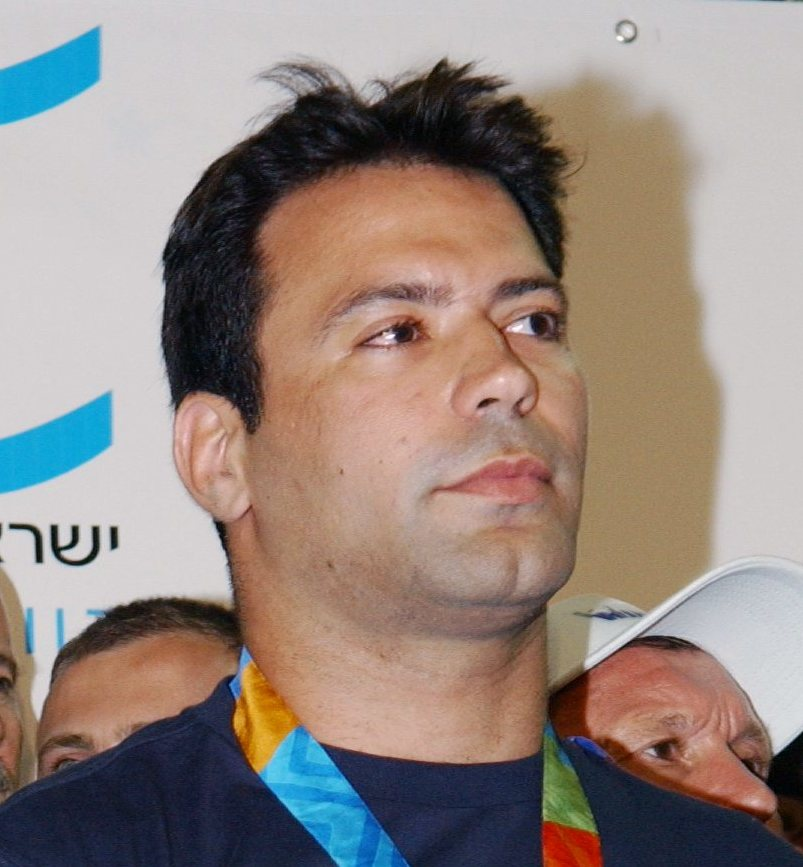
- Israeli Olympic bronze medalist Arik Ze'evi in 2004

Personal information
- Native name: אריאל "אריק" זאבי
- Nickname: Arik
- Born: 16 January 1977 (age 49)
- Occupation: Judo coach
- Website: www.arikzeevi.com

Sport
- Country: Israel
- Sport: Judo
- Weight class: ‍–‍100 kg
- Rank: 6th dan black belt

Achievements and titles
- Olympic Games: (bronze) (2004)
- World Champ.: (silver) (2001)
- European Champ.: (gold) (2001, 2003, 2004, 2012)
Medal record
Men's judo
Representing Israel
Olympic Games
Bronze medal – third place	2004 Athens	‍–‍100 kg
World Championships
Silver medal – second place	2001 Munich	Open
European Championships
Gold medal – first place	2001 Paris	‍–‍100 kg
Gold medal – first place	2003 Düsseldorf	‍–‍100 kg
Gold medal – first place	2004 Bucharest	‍–‍100 kg
Gold medal – first place	2012 Chelyabinsk	‍–‍100 kg
Silver medal – second place	2005 Rotterdam	‍–‍100 kg
Bronze medal – third place	1999 Bratislava	‍–‍100 kg
Bronze medal – third place	2007 Belgrade	‍–‍100 kg
Bronze medal – third place	2008 Lisbon	‍–‍100 kg
Bronze medal – third place	2010 Vienna	‍–‍100 kg
IJF Grand Slam
Gold medal – first place	2011 Moscow	‍–‍100 kg
Silver medal – second place	2010 Tokyo	‍–‍100 kg
IJF Grand Prix
Bronze medal – third place	2011 Baku	‍–‍100 kg
Bronze medal – third place	2011 Qingdao	‍–‍100 kg
European Junior Championships
Gold medal – first place	1995 Valladolid	‍–‍86 kg
Bronze medal – third place	1994 Lisbon	‍–‍86 kg
Maccabiah Games
Bronze medal – third place	1997 Maccabiah Games	‍–‍95 kg

Profile at external databases
- IJF: 847
- JudoInside.com: 2770
- Updated on 30 May 2023

Ze'evi interviews before the 2012 Olympic Games

Ariel "Arik" Ze'evi (Hebrew: אריאל "אריק" זאבי; born 16 January 1977) is an Israeli retired dan 6 black belt in judo. He had a long and successful career competing in half-heavyweight judo competitions. He won an Olympic bronze medal at the 2004 Summer Olympics in the men's 100 kg judo competition.

== Biography ==
Ze'evi is Jewish, and was born and raised in Bnei Brak, Israel, a predominantly Orthodox Jewish city in the Tel Aviv metropolitan area.

While growing up, he trained in the local judo club in his neighborhood, together with his older brother, Roni, who was also the club's first local gold medal pioneer after having finished first in the national Israeli Judo Championships. Ze'evi, heavily influenced by his brother and his accomplishment, began training intensively, and at the age of 15 won his first national competition in the adult class, becoming the country's youngest champion ever. Despite the lack of advanced training facilities, Ze'evi continued training in his local club and steadily closed the gap to world class level, and began competing abroad.

In his personal life, Ze'evi obtained a LLB degree from Reichman University (formerly Interdisciplinary Center Herzliya) in Herzliya.

He also hosted a sports television show for the Israeli Broadcasting Authority.

== Judo career ==
Ze'evi won a bronze medal in judo in the ‍–‍95 kg at the 1997 Maccabiah Games.

Ze'evi placed 5th competing for Israel at the 2000 Summer Olympics in the men's ‍–‍100 kg division, before winning a bronze medal representing Israel at the 2004 Summer Olympics in Athens 2004 in the men's ‍–‍100 kg division.

Ze'evi won European Championships gold in 2001, 2003, 2004 and 2012 and silve in 2005. He has also won four bronze medals in European Championships. Ze'evi also won the silver medal in the open category at the 2001 World Championships.

Ze'evi missed the 2005 World championships in Cairo due to a shoulder injury, and subsequently underwent surgery to repair the damage.

Representing Israel at the 2008 Summer Olympics in Beijing, Ze'evi failed to win a medal after losing his second match in the repechage bracket. Ze'evi told the Israeli media he does not want to end his career without a victory (probably hinting at the Judo World Championships in 2009).

According to the International Judo Federation's World Ranking List, as of April 2012, Ze'evi was ranked #8.

Ze'evi became a European champion for the fourth time in 2012, winning the competition in Chelyabinsk, Russia.

== Achievements ==
Year	Tournament	Result
1999	World Championships	5th
1999	European Championships	3rd
2000	Summer Olympics	5th
2001	European Championships	1st
2001	World Championships	2nd
2002	European Championships	5th
2003	European Championships	1st
2004	Olympic Qualification Championship	1st
2004	European Championships	1st
2004	Summer Olympics	3rd
2005	World Cup, Tallinn (Estonia)	3rd
2005	European Championships	2nd
2007	European Championships	3rd
2008	World Cup Tour, Prague (Czech Republic)	1st
2008	European Championships	3rd
2009	European Championships	5th
2010	European Championships	3rd
2010	Grand Slam Tokyo	2nd
2011	European Championships	7th
2011	Grand Slam Moscow	1st
2012	European Championships	1st

== See also ==
- List of select Jewish judokas
- List of Israelis
