= Dániel Hadfi =

Hungarian judoka (born 1982)

Personal information
- Born: 13 May 1982 (age 44)
- Occupation: Judoka

Sport
- Country: Hungary
- Sport: Judo
- Weight class: –100 kg

Achievements and titles
- World Champ.: (bronze) (2007)
- European Champ.: (gold) (2007)
Medal record
Men's judo
Representing Hungary
World Championships
Bronze medal – third place	2007 Rio de Janeiro	–100 kg
European Championships
Gold medal – first place	2007 Belgrade	–100 kg
Silver medal – second place	2006 Tampere	–100 kg
European U23 Championships
Gold medal – first place	2004 Ljubljana	–100 kg
World Juniors Championships
Bronze medal – third place	2000 Nabeul	–90 kg
European Junior Championships
Bronze medal – third place	2000 Nicosia	–90 kg

Profile at external databases
- IJF: 247
- JudoInside.com: 11166
- Updated on 17 February 2022

Dániel Hadfi (born 13 May 1982) is a Hungarian judoka.

== Achievements ==
Year	Tournament	Place	Weight class
2009	European Judo Championships	7th	Half heavyweight (100 kg)
2007	World Judo Championships	3rd	Half heavyweight (100 kg)
2007	European Judo Championships	1st	Half heavyweight (100 kg)
2006	European Judo Championships	2nd	Half heavyweight (100 kg)
2005	World Judo Championships	7th	Half heavyweight (100 kg)
