= Dmitry Maksimov (judoka) =

Russian judoka (born 1978)

Dmitry Valeriyevich Maksimov (Russian: Дмитрий Валерьевич Максимов; born 1 April 1978) is a Russian judoka.

== Achievements ==
Year	Tournament	Place	Weight class
2003	European Judo Championships	7th	Half heavyweight (100 kg)
