= Rhadi Ferguson =

American mixed martial arts fighter

- Born: Rhadi Bullard Ferguson; April 3, 1975 (age 51); Miami, Florida
- Nationality: American
- Height: 5 ft 8 in (1.73 m)
- Weight: 235 lb (107 kg; 16.8 st)
- Style: Brazilian Jiu-Jitsu, Judo, Wrestling, Boxing,
- Fighting out of: Coconut Creek, Florida, United States
- Team: Tampa Florida Judo
- Teacher: Jack Williams
- Rank: 5th Degree Black belt in Brazilian Jiu-Jitsu; 7th Degree Black belt in Judo
- Years active: 2004–2011

Mixed martial arts record
- Total: 3
- Wins: 3
- By knockout: 2
- By submission: 1
- Losses: 0

Other information
- University: Howard University; Capella University
- Spouse: Dr. Traci Thompson Ferguson (m. 2002–2019)
- Children: 2
- Website: http://www.rhadi.com/
- Mixed martial arts record from Sherdog

Rhadi Bullard Ferguson (born April 3, 1975) is an American former mixed martial artist and trainer, strength and conditioning coach, motivational speaker, and black belt in judo and Brazilian jiu-jitsu.

== Biography ==
Ferguson grew up in Miami, Florida in the United States where he began training in judo at the age of 6 under the tutelage of 9th degree red and white belt Jack Williams, until the age of 12. Ferguson had to quit judo for several years after his family had left Miami and moved to Rockville, Maryland and would not begin training again until after he finished college at age 22.

Ferguson is a 4 time national champion in judo. At the age of 29, Ferguson competed in judo at the 2004 Summer Olympics in Athens, Greece in the men's half-heavyweight division. He was previously an alternate in the 2000 Summer Olympics in Sydney, Australia.

Ferguson served as the Head Coach for the Bahamas Judo Federation from 2009 to 2011. During that time he served as the Head Coach at the 2009 World Judo Championships and the 2009 Cadet World Judo Championships. He then served in the position of Technical Advisor and served on the staff as an Assistant Coach in the 2018 World Judo Championships which was held in Nassau, Bahamas.

Ferguson was also the Assistant Coach for Team USA at the 2009 Grappling World Championships where Team USA Won the Gold in the team competition for men and women in Gi and No Gi.

In addition to Judo, Ferguson also holds a 5th degree black belt in Brazilian jiu-jitsu, and has competed in numerous jiu-jitsu and submission grappling tournaments. Ferguson was a member of American Top Team and received his Black Belt from Ricardo Liborio in 2006. During his competitive career, Ferguson who stands 5 ft 8 in and weighed 225 lb. had a reported 6% body fat.

Ferguson has coached many athletes including; Taraje Williams-Murray, Lloyd Irvin, Karo Parisyan, Cara Heads, Thiago Alves, Brandon Vera, Jeff Monson, Valerie Gotay, Marco González, Rashad Evans, Mo Lawal, and Bobby Lashley.

Ferguson appeared in Paper Line (2022) directed by Ryan Watson and filmed in Tampa, Florida. He most recently appeared again in Paper Made (2026).

== Education ==
Ferguson attended and graduated from Richard Montgomery High School in Rockville, Maryland in 1992. From 1992 to 1997 Ferguson attended Howard University in Washington, DC on a football scholarship and also was one of only a few students in the history of the school to play 3 sports (Football, Wrestling, and Track). Ferguson graduated with a bachelor's degree in mechanical engineering and later in 2002 received his Master of Arts in teaching with a 4.0 GPA from the university. In 2009, he received his Ph.D. in education with a 4.0 GPA from Capella University. While at Howard University he became a member of the Omega Psi Phi fraternity. Ferguson was inducted into the Howard University Athletic Hall of Fame as an individual in 2014, followed by an induction with his 1993 Black College National Championship Team in 2014, and lastly with his 1995 Conference wrestling team in 2023. He is currently the only 3-time Hall of Fame Inductee at Howard University and he is the only wrestler from an HBCU to compete at the Olympic Games.

== MMA career ==
Ferguson made his professional MMA debut in August 2010 and won his first two bout via TKO in the first round, and won by the same method in his second in 2011. He fought in the Light heavyweight division.

Ferguson made his Strikeforce debut at Strikeforce Challengers: Woodley vs. Saffiedine on January 7, 2011, competing in the light heavyweight division. He was originally scheduled to face Moldovan wrestler Ion Cherdivara, but visa issues forced him off the card with John Richard stepping in as a late replacement. Ferguson defeated Richard by submission (Kneebar) at 2:00 in round 3.

Ferguson retired from MMA with a record of 3-0 after his bout in Strikeforce.

== Personal life ==
Ferguson currently lives in South Florida and has two children with his ex-wife, Dr. Tracie Thompson, a board certified internal medicine doctor; son Rufus Alexander and daughter Rhadi Isabelle. Ferguson's cousin was a renowned street fighter, The Ultimate Fighter 10 cast member and UFC vet, Kevin "Kimbo Slice" Ferguson.

== Mixed martial arts record ==
Professional record breakdown
3 matches	3 wins	0 losses
By knockout	2	0
By submission	1	0

Res.	Record	Opponent	Method	Event	Date	Round	Time	Location	Notes
Win	3–0	John Richard	Submission (kneebar)	Strikeforce Challengers: Woodley vs. Saffiedine	January 7, 2011	2	2:00	Nashville, Tennessee, United States	
Win	2–0	Jeremy Boczulak	TKO (punches)	Gameness Fighting Championships	October 9, 2010	1	1:21	Nashville, Tennessee, United States	
Win	1–0	Darryell Perry II	TKO (punches)	Hybrid Fight League	August 21, 2010	1	0:07	Hopkinsville, Kentucky, United States	
