= Amel Mekić =

Bosnian judoka (born 1981)

Personal information
- Nationality: Bosnian
- Born: 21 September 1981 (age 44) Sarajevo, SR Bosnia and Herzegovina, SFR Yugoslavia
- Occupation: Judoka
- Height: 1.89 m (6 ft 2 1/2 in)

Sport
- Country: Bosnia and Herzegovina
- Sport: Judo
- Weight class: –100 kg

Achievements and titles
- Olympic Games: 9th (2008)
- World Champ.: 5th (2001, 2003, 2007)
- European Champ.: (gold) (2011)
Medal record
Men's judo
Representing Bosnia and Herzegovina
European Championships
Gold medal – first place	2011 Istanbul	–100 kg
European Junior Championships
Bronze medal – third place	2000 Nicosia	–90 kg
Summer Universiade
Bronze medal – third place	2003 Jeju	–100 kg
Mediterranean Games
Silver medal – second place	2013 Mersin	–100 kg
Bronze medal – third place	2005 Almería	–100 kg
Bronze medal – third place	2009 Pescara	–100 kg

Profile at external databases
- IJF: 28275
- JudoInside.com: 8356
- Updated on 17 February 2022

Amel Mekić (Cyrillic: Амел Мекић; born 21 September 1981) is a retired Bosnian judoka.

He won a gold medal at European Judo Championships in 2011, beating five opponents on a way, including two Olympic medalists Ariel Ze'evi and Henk Grol.

Mekić was part of the Bosnian Olympic team at the 2008 Summer Olympics (achieved 9th place after four fights) and at the 2012 Summer Olympics (lost in the first round). He was the Bosnian flag-bearer at both the 2008 and 2012 Summer Olympics.

Although he never won either an Olympic or a World medal, Mekić beat several Olympic and World medalists during his career, including Olympic champion Pawel Nastula, as well as World champions Frederic Demontfaucon, Dennis van der Geest and Luciano Corrêa.

== Achievements ==
Year	Tournament	Place	Weight class
2011	European Judo Championships	1st	Half heavyweight (100 kg)
2007	World Judo Championships	5th	Half heavyweight (100 kg)
2005	European Judo Championships	7th	Half heavyweight (100 kg)
2005	Mediterranean Games	3rd	Half heavyweight (100 kg)
2003	World Judo Championships	5th	Open class
2003	Universiade	3rd	Half heavyweight (100 kg)
2001	World Judo Championships	5th	Middleweight (90 kg)

== See also ==
- 2008 Summer Olympics national flag bearers
- 2012 Summer Olympics Parade of Nations

Olympic Games
Preceded by Nedžad Fazlija	Flagbearer for Bosnia and Herzegovina; Beijing 2008; London 2012	Succeeded by Amel Tuka
