= Olympic Committee of Bosnia and Herzegovina =

National Olympic Committee

- Country: Bosnia and Herzegovina
- [[|]]
- Code: BIH
- Created: 1992
- Recognized: 1993
- Continental Association: EOC
- Headquarters: Sarajevo, Bosnia and Herzegovina
- President: Izet Rađo
- Secretary General: Said Fazlagić
- Website: www.okbih.ba

The Olympic Committee of Bosnia and Herzegovina (Bosnian, Croatian and Serbian Latin: Olimpijski komitet Bosne i Hercegovine; Serbian Cyrillic: Олимпијски комитет Босне и Херцеговине; IOC Code: BIH) is a non-profit organization representing Bosnia and Herzegovina athletes in the International Olympic Committee. The committee organizes Bosnia's representatives at the Summer and Winter Olympic Games.

Members of the committee are 38 sports federations, which elect the Executive Council composed of the president and twelve members.

== History ==
The Olympic Committee of Bosnia and Herzegovina was founded on June 4, 1992. It grew out of the ZOI '84 organization, organizers of the 1984 Winter Olympics in Sarajevo. The committee maintains the Museum of the XIV Winter Olympiad. The first president of the committee was Stjepan Kljuić, with Izudin Filipović being the first secretary general. It became a full IOC and European Olympic Committee member in 1993.

Shortly after its foundation, the committee drafted the first athletes to participate under the Bosnian flag in the 1992 Summer Olympics in Barcelona.

== List of presidents ==
President	Term
Stjepan Kljuić	1992–1997
Bogić Bogićević	1997–2001
Ahmed Karabegović; Ljiljanko Naletilić; Zdravko Rađenović	2001–2002
Marijan Kvesić; Milanko Mučibabić; Nađa Avdibašić Vukadinović	2002–2007
Marijan Kvesić	2007–2008
Siniša Kisić	2008–2009
Izet Rađo	2009–2013
Siniša Kisić	2013–2014
Marijan Kvesić	2014–2017
Izet Rađo	2017–2018
Siniša Kisić	2018–2019
Izet Rađo	2019–2020
Marijan Kvesić	2020–2022
Milanko Mučibabić	2022–2023
Izet Rađo	2023–present

== Executive committee ==
- President: Izet Rađo
- Vice Presidents: Davor Komšić and Vico Zeljković
- Members: Suad Kaknjo, Nikola Stanković, Ivan Brkić, Tanja Karišik Košarac, Hamza Alić, Tomislav Cvitanušić, Slobodan Grahovac, Franjo Zadro, Kornelija Leko, Nihad Selimović

== Member federations ==
National Federations of Bosnia and Herzegovina are the organizations that coordinate all aspects of their individual sports. They are responsible for training, competition and development of their sports. There are currently 24 Olympic Summer and 6 Winter Sport Federations and eight Non-Olympic Sports Federations in Bosnia and Herzegovina.

=== Olympic Sport federations ===
National Federation	Summer or Winter	Headquarters
Athletic Federation of Bosnia and Herzegovina	Summer	Sarajevo
Badminton Association of Bosnia and Herzegovina	Summer	Banja Luka
Basketball Federation of Bosnia and Herzegovina	Summer	Sarajevo
Bob Association of Bosnia and Herzegovina	Winter	Sarajevo
Boxing Federation of Bosnia and Hеrzegovina	Summer	Sarajevo
Cycling Federation of Bosnia and Herzegovina	Summer	Banja Luka
Association of Equestrian Organisations of Bosnia and Herzegovina	Summer	Sarajevo
Football Association of Bosnia and Herzegovina	Summer	Sarajevo
Golf Association in Bosnia and Herzegovina	Summer	Sarajevo
Gymnastics Federation of Bosnia and Herzegovina	Summer	Sarajevo
Handball Federation of Bosnia and Herzegovina	Summer	Sarajevo
Bosnia and Herzegovina Ice Hockey Federation	Winter	Sarajevo
Canoe Federation of Bosnia and Herzegovina	Summer	Doboj
Ice Sports Federation of Bosnia and Herzegovina	Winter	Sarajevo
Judo Federation of Bosnia and Herzegovina	Summer	Sarajevo
Karate Federation of Bosnia and Herzegovina	Summer	Doboj
Luge Federation of Bosnia and Herzegovina	Winter	Sarajevo
Bosnia and Herzegovina Rowing Federation	Summer	Višegrad
Rugby Union of Bosnia and Herzegovina	Summer	Zenica
Shooting Federation of Bosnia and Herzegovina	Summer	Sarajevo
Skeleton Federation of Bosnia and Herzegovina	Winter	Sarajevo
Ski Federation of Bosnia and Herzegovina	Winter	Sarajevo
Swimming Association of Bosnia and Herzegovina	Summer	Laktaši
Table Tennis Federation of Bosnia-Herzegovina	Summer	Sarajevo
Taekwondo Federation of Bosnia and Herzegovina	Summer	Sarajevo
Tennis Association of Bosnia and Herzegovina	Summer	Sarajevo
Triathlon Association in Bosnia & Herzegovina	Summer	Sarajevo
Volleyball Federation of Bosnia and Herzegovina	Summer	Sarajevo
Water Polo Federation of Bosnia and Herzegovina	Summer	Sarajevo
Weightlifting Federation of Bosnia and Herzegovina	Summer	Sarajevo
Wrestling Federation of Bosnia and Herzegovina	Summer	Sarajevo

=== Non-Olympic Sport federations ===
National Federation	Headquarters
Aeronautical Federation of Bosnia and Herzegovina	Sarajevo
Bocce Federation of Bosnia and Herzegovina	Posušje
Cheerleading Federation of Bosnia and Herzegovina	Široki Brijeg
Chess Federation of Bosnia and Herzegovina	Sarajevo
Diving Association of Bosnia and Herzegovina	Sarajevo
Motorcycle Federation of Bosnia and Herzegovina	Kreševo
Special Olympics Bosnia and Herzegovina	Sarajevo
Sport Fishing Association of Bosnia and Herzegovina	Istočno Sarajevo

== See also ==
- Bosnia and Herzegovina at the Olympics
- National Olympic Committee
