= List of Bosnian and Herzegovinian records in athletics =

The following are the national records in athletics in Bosnia and Herzegovina maintained by the Athletic Federation of Bosnia and Herzegovina (Bosnian: Atletski savez Bosne i Hercegovine) (ASBIH).

== Outdoor ==
Key to tables: Awaiting ratification Record not kept by ASBIH Not ratified or later rescinded by ASBIH

=== Men ===
Event	Record	Athlete	Date	Meet	Place	Ref.
60 m	7.15 NWI	Sait Huseinbašić	7 May 2016		Zagreb, Croatia	
100 m	10.42 (+0.2 m/s)	Nedim Čović	1 July 2010	EA Classic Meet	Velenje, Slovenia	
100 m	10.2 h	Mladen Nikolić	14 May 1983		Belgrade, Yugoslavia	
100 m	10.34 (+0.7 m/s)	Mladen Nikolić	7 September 1984		Athens, Greece	
200 m	21.05 (+0.9 m/s)	Nedim Čović	6 June 2010	Bosnian Championships	Sarajevo, Bosnia and Herzegovina	
200 m	20.5 h	Mladen Nikolić	3 June 1984 (+1.2 m/s)		Belgrade, Yugoslavia	
200 m	20.74 (+1.2 m/s)	Mladen Nikolić	9 September 1984		Athens, Greece	
400 m	46.15	Amel Tuka	28 June 2019	Meeting of “Citta di Nembro”	Nembro, Italy	
600 m	1:15.21	Amel Tuka	8 May 2016	26. Internationales Läufermeeting	Pliezhausen, Germany	
800 m	1:42.51	Amel Tuka	17 July 2015	Herculis	Fontvieille, Monaco	
1500 m	3:39.83	Vinko Pokrajčić	22 July 1981		Bucharest, Romania	
Mile	3:58.41	Vinko Pokrajčić	7 June 1981		Karlovac, Yugoslavia	
3000 m	8:07.15	Vinko Pokrajčić	2 June 1981		Maribor, Yugoslavia	
5000 m	14:00.2 h	Bilko Kačar	13 April 1980		Nova Gorica, Yugoslavia	
10,000 m	29:29.8 h	Sead Kondo	7 June 1975		Sarajevo, Yugoslavia	
Half marathon	1:05:45	Đuro Kodžo	15 June 2003		Rijeka, Croatia	
Marathon	2:15:55	Sead Kondo	3 May 1975		Karl-Marx-Stadt, East Germany	
110 m hurdles	13.82 (+1.6 m/s)	Damir Haračić	19 June 2005		Istanbul, Turkey	
400 m hurdles	50.84	Dušan Milutinović	13 August 1989		Serres, Greece	
2000 m steeplechase	5:56.20	Belmin Mrkanović	2 July 2016	Balkan Youth Championships	Kruševac, Serbia	
3000 m steeplechase	8:31.0 h	Bilko Kačar	29 August 1981		Øvre Årdal, Norway	
High jump	2.31 m	Elvir Krehmić	7 July 1998		Zagreb, Croatia	
Pole vault	5.25 m	Arian Milicija	11 April 2025	Sun City Classic	El Paso, United States	
Long jump	7.63 m NWI	Milan Babić	11 June 1968		Celje, Yugoslavia	
Triple jump	16.05 m	Muamer Karajica	8 July 1979		Sarajevo, Yugoslavia	
Shot put	21.48 m	Mesud Pezer	13 August 2019		Växjö, Sweden	
Discus throw	63.50 m	Dragan Mustapić	6 May 1990		Gorizia, Italy	
Discus throw	65.29	Voislav Grubiša	8 June 2024	Prvenstvo Dalmacije za starije kategorije	Split, Croatia	
Hammer throw	65.42 m	Dražen Goić	9 June 1974		Sarajevo, Yugoslavia	
Javelin throw	81.63 m	Dejan Mileusnić	18 June 2016	National Championships	Zenica, Bosnia and Herzegovina	
Decathlon	6653 pts h (Note: not ratified by ASBIH but recognized by World Athletics)	Esad Vilić	16–17 September 1966		Sarajevo, Yugoslavia	
Decathlon	100m / Long jump / Shot put / High jump / 400m / 110m H / Discus / Pole vault / Javelin / 1500m; 11.6 / 6.65 m / 15.34 m / 1.73 m / 52.3 / 15.9 / 48.66 m / 3.50 m / 50.88 m / 5:09.1					
10 km walk	44:20:8	Vinko Galušić	15 May 1976		Sarajevo, Yugoslavia	
20 km walk (road)	1:28:52	Mićo Cvjetković	17 April 1988		Ruše, Yugoslavia	
50 km walk (road)						
4 × 100 m relay	41.19	Bosnia and Herzegovina; Edhem Vikalo; Hajrudin Vejzović; Rusmir Malkočević; Egon Savić	19 June 2021	European Team Championships	Limassol, Cyprus	
4 × 400 m relay	3:09.47	Bosnia and Herzegovina; Rusmir Malkočević; Semir Avdić; Abedin Mujezinović; Amel Tuka	26 June 2016	Balkan Championships	Pitești, Romania	

=== Women ===
Event	Record	Athlete	Date	Meet	Place	Ref.
60 m	8.00 NWI	Sara Mijanović	3 September 2023		Brno, Czech Republic	
100 m	12.06 (+1.2 m/s)	Nejra Bosnić	12 June 2021	Slovenian U23 Championships	Novo Mesto, Slovenia	
100 m	11.97 (+0.7 m/s)	Milica Pelemiš	7 August 2025	Serbia Athletics Meeting	Belgrade, Serbia	
200 m	24.42 (+0.1 m/s)	Ajla Reizbegović	3 August 2025	Bosnia & Herzegovina Championships	Zenica, Bosnia and Herzegovina	
300 m	40.06	Nika Popić	11 September 2024	Međunarodni Atletski Miting	Karlovac, Croatia	
400 m	54.28	Dijana Kojić	24 July 1999		Komotini, Greece	
800 m	2:03.02	Biba Kajan-Subašić	22 June 1985		Zagreb, Yugoslavia	
1500 m	4:12.19	Marica Mršić	14 June 1983		Nova Gorica, Yugoslavia	
3000 m	9:05.42	Marica Mršić	25 June 1983		İzmir, Turkey	
5000 m	15:53.45	Mirsada Burić	14 April 1995	Mt. SAC Relays	Walnut, United States	
10,000 m	34:03.23	Lucia Kimani	12 April 2008		Istanbul, Turkey	
10 km (road)	33:13	Lucia Kimani	28 June 2008		Brčko, Bosnia and Herzegovina	
Half marathon	1:12:55	Lucia Kimani	14 October 2007	World Road Running Championships	Udine, Italy	
Marathon	2:34:57	Lucia Kimani	9 October 2011		Zagreb, Croatia	
100 m hurdles	13.80 NWI	Emina Pilav	26 August 1973		Athens, Greece	
400 m hurdles	58.99	Gorana Cvijetić	4 July 2007		Sofia, Bulgaria	
400 m hurdles	58.95	Masa Garic	28 August 2024		Lima, Peru	
3000 m steeplechase	10:16.80	Biljana Cvijanović	28 June 2013	Mediterranean Games	Mersin, Turkey	
High jump	1.94 m	Amra Temim	15 August 1987		Varaždin, Yugoslavia	
Pole vault	2.82 m	Neira Hadžiahmetagić	16 September 2023		Sarajevo, Bosnia and Herzegovina	
Pole vault	2.90 m	Neira Hadžiahmetagić	8 July 2023	Bosnia & Herzegovina Championships	Sarajevo, Bosnia and Herzegovina	
Long jump	6.07 m NWI	Tanja Marković	8 August 2015		Sokolac, Bosnia and Herzegovina	
Triple jump	12.92 m NWI	Anđela Kovačević	3 July 2010		Sarajevo, Bosnia and Herzegovina	
Shot put	14.91 m	Katica Tošić-Šporer	17 September 1966		Sarajevo, Yugoslavia	
Discus throw	52.58 m	Kosa Stojković-Nikolić	17 July 1977		Bucharest, Romania	
Hammer throw	64.95 m	Stefani Vukajlović	19 April 2019		Durham, United States	
Javelin throw	55.69 m	Vanja Spaić	15 April 2022		Long Beach, United States	
Heptathlon	5312 pts	Mirsada Pekmezović	18–19 September 1981		Sarajevo, Yugoslavia	
Heptathlon	100m H / High jump / Shot put / 200m / Long jump / Javelin / 800m; 15.04 / 1.63 m / 12.12 m / 26.13 / 5.76 m / 42.20 m / 2:24.52					
20 km walk (road)	1:55:49	Meliha Mulahalilović	12 April 2008		Bucharest, Romania	
35 km walk (road)						
50 km walk (road)						
4 × 100 m relay	47.12	Bosnia and Herzegovina; Emina Đulić; Emina Omanović; Sara Mijanović; Ajla Reizbegović	24 June 2025	European Team Championships	Maribor, Slovenia	
4 × 400 m relay	3:47.73	SR Bosnia and Herzegovina; N. Šljivić; M. Cvjetinović; Jasmina Fočak; Marica Mršić	19 June 1983		Sarajevo, Yugoslavia	

=== Mixed ===
Event	Record	Athlete	Date	Meet	Place	Ref.
4 × 400 m relay	3:30.42	Bosnia and Herzegovina; Amel Tuka; Džana Suljić; Abedin Mujezinović; Maša Garić	25 June 2025	European Team Championships	Maribor, Slovenia	

== Indoor ==
=== Men ===
Event	Record	Athlete	Date	Meet	Place	Ref.
60 m	6.73	Edhem Vikalo	22 January 2023		Valencia, Spain	
200 m	22.14	Damir Redžepagić	28 January 2018		Belgrade, Serbia	
200 m	21.88	Bakir Music	15 January 2025		Belgrade, Serbia	
400 m	47.14	Amel Tuka	21 February 2018	Serbian Open	Belgrade, Serbia	
800 m	1:45.95	Amel Tuka	24 February 2021	Villa de Madrid Indoor Meeting	Madrid, Spain	
1000 m	2:29.91	Jovan Rosić	3 February 2024	Zagreb Open Championships	Zagreb, Croatia	
1500 m	3:46.2 h	Vinko Pokrajčić	25 February 1979	European Championships	Vienna, Austria	
1500 m	3:48.69	Dušan Babić	6 February 2015	Gugl Indoor Meeting	Linz, Austria	
Mile	4:19.05	Ermin Mujezinović	4 December 2010	Jay Carisellla Invitational	Roxbury, United States	
3000 m	8:03.66	Vinko Pokrajčić	11 February 1984		Turin, Italy	
60 m hurdles	7.96	Adnan Malkić	6 March 2009	European Championships	Turin, Italy	
High jump	2.29 m	Elvir Krehmić	13 February 1999		Piraeus, Greece	
Pole vault	5.15 m	Arian Milicija	21 February 2024	Memorial Josip Gasparac	Osijek, Croatia	
Long jump	7.51 m	Milan Babić	11 March 1967		Prague, Czechoslovakia	
Triple jump	15.55 m	Sedin Heco	28 December 2019		Belgrade, Serbia	
Shot put	21.42 m	Mesud Pezer	13 February 2024	Belgrade Indoor Meeting	Belgrade, Serbia	
Weight throw	9.16 m	Semir Kavaz	27 March 2014	World Masters Championships	Budapest, Hungary	
Heptathlon	4721 pts	Luka Ivicić	24–25 February 2024	Serbian Combined Championships	Belgrade, Serbia	
Heptathlon	60m / Long jump / Shot put / High jump / 60m H / Pole vault / 1000m; 7.64 / 5.83 m / 10.55 m / 1.88 m / 9.01 / 4.40 m / 2:45.54					
5000 m walk	20:55.3	Denis Erkić	31 January 1998		Berlin, Germany	
4 × 400 m relay	3:18.12	Bosnia and Herzegovina; Rusmir Malkocević; Stefan Cucović; Semir Avdić; Abedin Mujezinović	25 February 2017	Balkan Championships	Belgrade, Serbia	

=== Women ===
Event	Record	Athlete	Date	Meet	Place	Ref.
60 m	7.75	Ana Curcović	29 January 2022		Zagreb, Croatia	
60 m	7.67	Ajla Reizbegovic	27 January 2024		Hungary	
200 m	25.04	Ajla Reizbegović	7 February 2026	Majstrovstvá AZB	Vienna, Austria	
400 m	55.91	Jelena Gajić	24 February 2021		Belgrade, Serbia	
800 m	2:06.66	Jelena Gajić	7 February 2021		Belgrade, Serbia	
1500 m	4:21.72	Jasmina Fočak	16 February 1985		Genoa, Italy	
3000 m	9:26.08	Mirsada Burić	13 February 1991		Turin, Italy	
60 m hurdles	8.56	Emina Pilav	15 February 1975		Sofia, Bulgaria	
High jump	1.88 m	Samra Tanović-Bjelica	30 January 1986		Vienna, Austria	
Pole vault	2.53 m	Neira Hadžiahmetagić	21 February 2024		Osijek, Croatia	
Long jump	5.87 m	Emina Omanović	26 December 2021	Novogodišnji miting	Belgrade, Serbia	
Triple jump	12.11 m	Andjela Kovacević	12 February 2011		Zenica, Bosnia and Herzegovina	
Triple jump	13.72 m	Gorana Tešanović	23 January 2016		Zagreb, Croatia	
Shot put	14.79 m	Mediha Salkić	20 February 2021		Istanbul, Turkey	
Pentathlon	3820 pts	Mladena Petruseić	3 March 2018	Serbian Championships Combined Events	Belgrade, Serbia	
Pentathlon	60m H / High jump / Shot put / Long jump / 800m; 9.03 / 1.78 m / 11.88 m / 5.21 m / 2:29.97					
3000 m walk	14:14.25	Kada Delić-Selimović	11 March 1994	European Championships	Paris, France	
4 × 400 m relay	4:13.17	Bosnia and Herzegovina; Nika Popić; Jovana Zebić; Ema Kovač; Ema Mešković	4 February 2024	Balkan U20 Championships	Belgrade, Serbia	

== See also ==
- Bosnia and Herzegovina at the World Championships in Athletics
