= Driss Dacha =

Moroccan long-distance runner (born 1962)

Personal information
- Born: 29 December 1962 (age 63)

Sport
- Country: Morocco

Achievements and titles
- Personal bests: Half marathon: 1:02:28; Marathon: 2:11:43
Medal record
Men's athletics
Representing Morocco
World Marathon Majors
Silver medal – second place	1993 Berlin	Marathon

Driss Dacha (born 29 December 1962) is a Moroccan retired long-distance runner who won several marathons and was named to the 1989 World Marathon Cup team for his country. He was the runner-up at the 1993 Berlin Marathon.

== Professional career ==
Dacha has placed in the top four of more than 20 major races. He has won six marathons. A major victory in his career came on 26 September 1993 when he finished second at the Berlin Marathon in 2:11:43.

His professional career started in 1988 when he won the Marathon of Lyon. From 1987 to 1989, he ran four sub-2:20 marathons (twice in Reims Marathon, once at the French Riviera Marathon, and once at Marrakech Marathon).

The fast times locked him in for Morocco's World Marathon Cup team in 1989 along with Driss Lakkim, Nourredine Sobhi, and Rachid Tbahi. At Milan, Italy, they gathered in April with the best in the world to compete for individual and team places. Lakkim lead the team (he finished in 2:16:49 for 29th) as Ethiopian Metaferia Zeleke won. Dacha was off his faster paces and finished 74th. Two weeks before the race, he had run another marathon (the Brest Marathon in France) and had won in 2:23:51.

But he bounced back with a win at the 1989 Marathon de La Rochelle, which had been founded eight years earlier. Then at the Rome Marathon, he sped to a 2:16:54 personal best time in an eighth-place finish. A few months later he was 16th at the 1990 Paris Marathon in 2:17:16, not far behind Olympian Peter Daenens.

He finished sixth at the Marrakech Marathon that year, trained more, and then lowered his marathon PR to 2:14:51 in a second-place finish at the Lille Marathon in France. He returned to Paris and Marrakech, running 2:17 at both, then placed third at the 1991 Barcelona Marathon.

Wearing his trademark headband (this time a bandana folded down), he completed at the 1991 Grandma's Marathon. The race from Two Harbors, Minnesota, to Duluth along the North Shore of Lake Superior had clear skies and 60-degree weather for runners such as American Doug Kurtis, Brazilian Jose Cesar de Souza, Soviet Igor Braslavskiy, Swiss World Marathon Cup competitor Richard Umberg, and others. The lead pack split apart after mile 16, with De Souza in the lead. But Dacha dropped a 5:09 mile at mile 19 and fought through a side stitch to win and set a personal-record time (2:13:59).

He finished top-10 in several other road races throughout 1991 and 1992, including a tactical, lead-changing New Haven Road Race, the Los Angeles Marathon, and a third-place finish (for $10,000) at windy and cool Twin Cities Marathon in 2:13:03, a minute behind the neck-and-neck finish of Malcolm Norwood and Robert Kempainen.

On a hot and windy day in Cleveland, Dacha prepared to race against Don Janicki, Simon Naali, and others in an international field. The first-place prize for the 1992 Cleveland Marathon was $25,000 and an extra $10,000 was set aside for breaking the course record. Dacha took control of the race after the half-marathon mark on course-record-breaking pace, but questioned whether or not he would finish by mile 17. The Barcelona Olympics were coming up that summer and he didn't want to push too hard in the heat. But he did finish, winning in 2:14:40, just short of the record.

He did not run in the Olympics, however. Morocco only sent one runner to compete in the marathon, and that was Salah Qoqaïche, who finished sixth. Instead, Dacha ran the San Francisco Marathon in August, finishing in 2:17:30. He wore longer shorts and had a bottle problem that mixed up his race, though he still managed to stay ahead of Nivaldo Filho and Peter Renner. At the finish line, Dacha was 46 seconds behind Mexican winner Sergio Jimenez.

He finished out the year with another sub-2:14 race: The 1992 New York City Marathon. As apartheid sanctions were lifted for South African athletes, Willie Mtolo overcame a strange, rushed start to take the win and Dacha chased Italians Walter Durbano and Luca Barzaghi closely to finish eighth in 2:13:35.

Dacha went back to both San Francisco and Cleveland the next year. In Cleveland, he finished seventh in 2:17:22 as Don Janicki set a course record. But in San Francisco, he led an international field with runners such as Agapius Masong through the hilly course. Instead of pulling away early, Dacha ran a tactical race, waiting until Sunset Boulevard (mile 22), to surge, and he crossed the tape uncontested in 2:20:02.

The following month he was ready to run America's Finest City Half Marathon in San Diego and face off against the previous year's winner (and future US Half Marathon Champion), Alfredo Viguera. The race was going Dacha's way through the 10K mark (which he passed in 28:29) though Brian Abshire and another runner were still with him. Then a blister formed on his left foot, hindering him slightly. He took the lead, but Viguera showed up on his shoulder at mile 11. They ran together, sprinted together, and—amazingly—crossed the finish line together, passing through at a tied 1:04:33. One winner had to be decided, and race officials determined that Viguera edged Dacha by an inch as he dove for the finish-line tape. Dacha would take second place and use the incident as fuel for his upcoming major marathon.

The 1993 Berlin Marathon brought major contenders to Germany in late September. Dacha fended off Alfredo Shahanga of Tanzania and Czech Karel David before moving ahead of the 1992 winner (David Tsebe). The run brought him to the finish line in second place with a personal best time of 2:11:43. South African Xolile Yawa won.

In the 1995 Chicago Marathon, Dacha ran 2:12:05 to finish fourth behind German winner Eamonn Martin.

Dacha continued running competitively as he climbed the age categories, finishing in the top of many race results through the globe, including Las Vegas, Salt Lake City, Monaco, Long Beach, Tampa, Toronto and others. In 2005, Runner's World named him as a contender for Master's Runner of the Year. After passing his 50th birthday, Dacha was still clocking fast times in the Master's category.

== Achievements ==
Year	Competition	Venue	Position	Event	Notes
1988	Marathon de Lyon	Lyon, France	1st	Marathon	2:20:31
1989	IAAF World Marathon Cup	Milan, Italy	74th	Marathon	2:25:46
1989	Marathon de La Rochelle	La Rochelle, France	1st	Marathon	2:24:04
1991	Grandma's Marathon	Two Harbors to Duluth, United States	1st	Marathon	2:13:59
1992	Cleveland Marathon	Cleveland, United States	1st	Marathon	2:14:40
1993	San Francisco Marathon	San Francisco, United States	1st	Marathon	2:20:02
1993	Berlin Marathon	Berlin, Germany	2nd	Marathon	2:11:43
1995	America's Finest City Half Marathon	San Diego, United States	1st	Half marathon	1:05:11

== Personal life ==
Driss Dacha did not start running until he was 19. After high school, Dacha completed a physical education degree in Ireland. For a time, he was coached by fellow Moroccan Kahlid Skah. He coached runners through Toronto-based Marathon Dynamics coaching. He lived and trained in several locations, including Boulder, Colorado, and Flagstaff, Arizona, (with Salah Hissou for a time) before moving back to Morocco.
