= Mirsada =

Mirsada or Mersada is a Bosnian feminine given name that may refer to the following notable people:

- Mirsada Bajraktarević (1951–1976), Bosnian singer and songwriter
- Mersada Bećirspahić (born 1957), Bosnian basketball player
- Mirsada Burić (born 1970), Bosnian long-distance runner
