= Bosnia and Herzegovina at the 1999 World Championships in Athletics =

- WA code: BIH
- National federation: Athletic Federation of Bosnia and Herzegovina
- Website: www.asbih.org

in Seville, Spain
- Competitors: 2 (1 man, 1 woman) in 2 events
- Medals: Gold 0 Silver 0 Bronze 0 Total 0

World Championships in Athletics appearances (overview)
- 1993; 1995; 1997; 1999; 2001; 2003; 2005; 2007; 2009; 2011; 2013; 2015; 2017; 2019; 2022; 2023; 2025

Other related appearances
- Yugoslavia (1983–1991)

Bosnia and Herzegovina competed at the 1999 World Championships in Athletics from 20 – 29 August 1999.

== Results ==
=== Men ===
Field events

Athlete	Event	Qualification		Final	
Athlete	Event	Distance	Position	Distance	Position
Elvir Krehmić	High jump	2.20	22	Did not advance	

=== Women ===
Track and road events

Athlete	Event	Heat		Quarterfinal		Semifinal		Final	
Athlete	Event	Result	Rank	Result	Rank	Result	Rank	Result	Rank
Dijana Kojić	400 m	56.08	7	Did not advance					

== See also ==
- Bosnia and Herzegovina at the World Championships in Athletics
