= Bosnia and Herzegovina at the 1995 World Championships in Athletics =

- WA code: BIH
- National federation: Athletic Federation of Bosnia and Herzegovina

in Gothenburg, Sweden
- Competitors: 2 (1 man, 1 woman) in 2 events
- Medals: Gold 0 Silver 0 Bronze 0 Total 0

World Championships in Athletics appearances (overview)
- 1993; 1995; 1997; 1999; 2001; 2003; 2005; 2007; 2009; 2011; 2013; 2015; 2017; 2019; 2022; 2023; 2025

Other related appearances
- Yugoslavia (1983–1991)

Bosnia and Herzegovina competed at the 1995 World Championships in Athletics from 5 – 13 August 1995.

== Results ==
=== Men ===
Track and road events

Athlete	Event	Final	
Athlete	Event	Result	Rank
Islam Ðugum	Marathon	2:38:37	53

=== Women ===
Track and road events

Athlete	Event	Final	
Athlete	Event	Result	Rank
Kada Delić	10 km walk	47:43	39

== See also ==
- Bosnia and Herzegovina at the World Championships in Athletics
