= Bosnia and Herzegovina at the 2017 World Championships in Athletics =

- Flag of Bosnia and Herzegovina
- WA code: BIH
- National federation: Athletic Federation of Bosnia and Herzegovina
- Website: asbih.org

in London, United Kingdom 4–13 August 2017
- Competitors: 3 (3 men) in 2 events
- Medals: Gold 0 Silver 0 Bronze 0 Total 0

World Championships in Athletics appearances (overview)
- 1993; 1995; 1997; 1999; 2001; 2003; 2005; 2007; 2009; 2011; 2013; 2015; 2017; 2019; 2022; 2023; 2025

Other related appearances
- Yugoslavia (1983–1991)

Bosnia and Herzegovina competed at the 2017 World Championships in Athletics in London, United Kingdom, 4–13 August 2017.

== Results ==
=== Men ===
Track and road events

Athlete	Event	Heat		Semifinal		Final	
Athlete	Event	Result	Rank	Result	Rank	Result	Rank
Amel Tuka	800 metres	1:46.54	21	Did not advance			

Field events

Athlete	Event	Qualification		Final	
Athlete	Event	Distance	Position	Distance	Position
Hamza Alić	Shot put	18.95	32	Did not advance	
Mesud Pezer	Shot put	19.88	21	Did not advance	
