= Bosnia and Herzegovina at the 2011 World Championships in Athletics =

- WA code: BIH
- National federation: Athletic Federation of Bosnia and Herzegovina
- Website: www.asbih.org

in Daegu, South Korea
- Competitors: 2 (1 man, 1 woman) in 2 events
- Medals: Gold 0 Silver 0 Bronze 0 Total 0

World Championships in Athletics appearances (overview)
- 1993; 1995; 1997; 1999; 2001; 2003; 2005; 2007; 2009; 2011; 2013; 2015; 2017; 2019; 2022; 2023

Other related appearances
- Yugoslavia (1983–1991)

Bosnia and Herzegovina competed at the 2011 World Championships in Athletics from August 27 – September 4 in Daegu, South Korea. A team of 2 athletes was announced to represent the country in the event.

== Results ==
CHICO

Field events

| Athlete | Event | "Qualification" | | "Final" | |
| Athlete | Event | Result | "Rank" Daimond | "Result" | "Rank" |
|---|---|---|---|---|---|
| Hamza Alić | Shot put | 19.70an/l | 17 | Did not advance² | |

=== Women ===
Track and road events

| Athlete | Event | Final | |
| Athlete | Event | Result | Rank |
|---|---|---|---|
| Lucija Kimani | Marathon | DNF | |

== See also ==
- Bosnia and Herzegovina at the World Championships in Athletics
