= Bosnia and Herzegovina at the 2022 World Athletics Championships =

- Flag of Bosnia and Herzegovina
- WA code: BIH
- National federation: Athletic Federation of Bosnia and Herzegovina
- Website: asbih.org

in Eugene, United States 15 July 2022 – 24 July 2022
- Competitors: 1 (1 man)
- Medals: Gold 0 Silver 0 Bronze 0 Total 0

World Athletics Championships appearances (overview)
- 1993; 1995; 1997; 1999; 2001; 2003; 2005; 2007; 2009; 2011; 2013; 2015; 2017; 2019; 2022; 2023; 2025

Other related appearances
- Yugoslavia (1983–1991)

Bosnia and Herzegovina competed at the 2022 World Athletics Championships in Eugene, United States, from 15 to 24 July 2022. Bosnia and Herzegovina were represented by 1 athlete.

== Results ==
=== Men ===
Track and road events

Athlete	Event	Heat		Semi-final		Final	
Athlete	Event	Result	Rank	Result	Rank	Result	Rank
Abedin Mujezinović	800 metres	01:46.26 SB	18	Did not advance			
