= 1993 Berlin Marathon =

Berliner Marathon in 1993, Germany

20th Berlin Marathon
- Venue: Berlin, Germany
- Dates: 26 September 1993

Champions
- Men: Xolile Yawa (2:10:57)
- Women: Renata Kokowska (2:25:15)

The 1993 Berlin Marathon was the 20th running of the annual marathon race held in Berlin, Germany, held on 26 September 1993. South Africa's Xolile Yawa won the men's race in 2:10:57 hours, while the women's race was won by Poland's Renata Kokowska in 2:26:20.

== Results ==
=== Men ===
Position	Athlete	Nationality	Time
1	Xolile Yawa	South Africa	2:10:57
2	Driss Dacha	Morocco	2:11:43
3	David Tsebe	South Africa	2:12:07
4	Alfredo Shahanga	Tanzania	2:12:24
5	Karel David	Czech Republic	2:12:29
6	Andrzej Krzyścin	Poland	2:13:14
7	Mirosław Plawgo	Poland	2:13:47
8	Tendai Chimusasa	Zimbabwe	2:14:23
9	Gidamis Shahanga	Tanzania	2:14:45
10	Isaac Tshabalala	South Africa	2:15:01

=== Women ===
Position	Athlete	Nationality	Time
1	Renata Kokowska	Poland	2:26:20
2	Albertina Dias	Portugal	2:26:49
3	Małgorzata Sobańska	Poland	2:29:21
4	Tatyana Polovinskaya	Ukraine	2:29:29
5	Laura Fogli	Italy	2:31:16
6	Emma Scaunich	Italy	2:31:59
7	Aurica Buia	Romania	2:33:40
8	Kirsi Mattila	Finland	2:33:49
9	Cristina Costea	Romania	2:36:32
10	Sonja Oberem	Germany	2:38:02
