= Bosnia and Herzegovina at the 2013 World Championships in Athletics =

- WA code: BIH
- National federation: Athletic Federation of Bosnia and Herzegovina

in Moscow
- Competitors: 2 (2 men) in 1 event
- Medals: Gold 0 Silver 0 Bronze 0 Total 0

World Championships in Athletics appearances (overview)
- 1993; 1995; 1997; 1999; 2001; 2003; 2005; 2007; 2009; 2011; 2013; 2015; 2017; 2019; 2022; 2023; 2025

Other related appearances
- Yugoslavia (1983–1991)

Bosnia and Herzegovina competed at the 2013 World Championships in Athletics in Moscow, Russia, from 10 to 18 August 2013. Bosnia and Herzegovina were represented by 2 athletes.

== Results ==
=== Men ===
Field events

| Athlete | Event | Preliminaries | | Final | |
| Athlete | Event | Width Height | Rank | Width Height | Rank |
|---|---|---|---|---|---|
| Hamza Alić | Shot put | 19.18 | 19 | Did not advance | |
| Kemal Mešić | Shot put | 18.98 | 22 | Did not advance | |

== See also ==
- Bosnia and Herzegovina at the World Championships in Athletics
