= Letesenbet Gidey =

Ethiopian long-distance runner (born 1998)

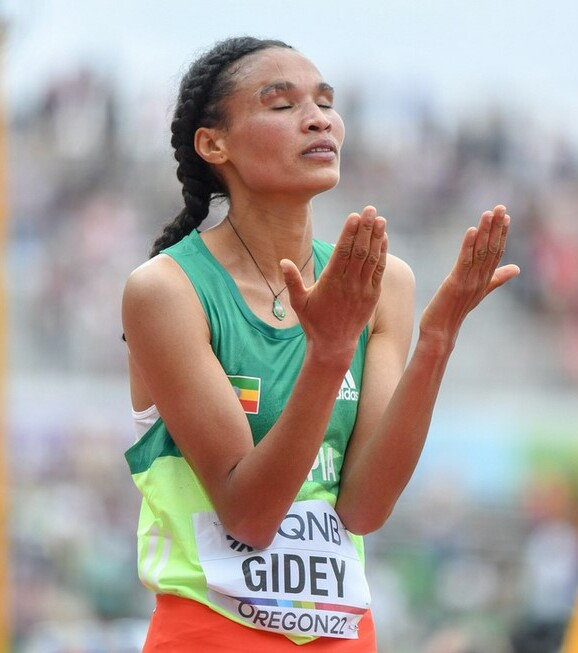
- Letesenbet at the 2022 World Championships in Eugene

Personal information
- Born: 20 March 1998 (age 28) Endameskel, Tigray Region, Ethiopia
- Height: 1.66 m (5 ft 5 in)
- Weight: 50 kg (110 lb)

Sport
- Country: Ethiopia
- Sport: Athletics
- Events: Track, road and cross-country long-distance running
- Team: NN Running Team

Achievements and titles
- Olympic finals: 2021 Tokyo; 10,000 m, Bronze
- World finals: 2017 London; 5000 m, 11th; 2019 Doha; 10,000 m, Silver; 2022 Eugene; 5000 m, 5th; 10,000 m, Gold; 2023 Budapest; 10,000 m, Silver
- Highest world ranking: 1st (10,000 m, 2023)
- Personal bests: 3000 m: 8:20.27 (Palo Alto 2019); 5000 m: 14:06.62 NR (Valencia 2020); 10,000 m: 29:01.03 NR (Hengelo 2021); Road; 10 km: 33:55 (Bengaluru 2019); 15 km: 44:20 WB (Nijmegen 2019); Half marathon: 1:02:52 WR (Valencia 2021); Marathon: 2:16:49 (Valencia 2022)
Medal record
Women's athletics
Representing Ethiopia
Olympic Games
Bronze medal – third place	2020 Tokyo	10,000 m
World Championships
Gold medal – first place	2022 Eugene	10,000 m
Silver medal – second place	2019 Doha	10,000 m
Silver medal – second place	2023 Budapest	10,000 m
World Cross Country Championships
Gold medal – first place	2015 Guiyang	Junior race
Gold medal – first place	2015 Guiyang	Junior team
Gold medal – first place	2017 Kampala	Junior race
Gold medal – first place	2017 Kampala	Junior team
Gold medal – first place	2019 Aarhus	Senior team
Bronze medal – third place	2019 Aarhus	Senior race
World Marathon Majors
Silver medal – second place	2023 New York	Marathon

Letesenbet Gidey (Tigrinya: ለተሰንበት ግደይ, born 20 March 1998) is an Ethiopian long-distance runner. In the 10,000 metres, she is the 2020 Tokyo Olympic bronze medallist, 2019 World silver medallist, and 2022 World champion. Her record of 29.01.03 is the second fastest time ever, only second to Kenyan rival Beatrice Chebet. Letesenbet is the first athlete ever, male or female, to hold the 5000m, 10000m, and half marathon world records simultaneously.

Letesenbet holds the current world record in the half marathon, which she set in October 2021. Remarkably, this was Letesenbet's first ever half marathon. Her record broke the previous mark by more than a minute. She also holds the world best in the 15 km road race, which was also an improvement of over a minute. Letesenbet became the first woman to break the 64 and 63-minute barriers in the half marathon and the 45-minute barrier in the 15 km. She recorded the fastest women's marathon debut in history at the 2022 Valencia Marathon, placing her seventh on the respective world all-time list with a time of 2.16.49.

At age 17, Letesenbet won the junior race at the 2015 World Cross Country Championships. She retained the title in 2017 to take a bronze medal in the senior race in 2019.

== Early life and background ==
Letesenbet Gidey was born in Endameskel in the Tigray Region of Ethiopia. She is the youngest of four siblings, having two brothers and a sister, and grew up on the family's farm.

She was expelled from school as a 13-year-old for refusing to run in physical education classes and was only allowed to return when she agreed to participate. She then won the 2,000 m / 3,000 m steeplechase double for the Tigray region at the Ethiopian Schools Championships in Shashemane in late 2012.

== Junior career ==
=== 2014 ===
On 14 June, 16-year-old Letesenbet ran the 5,000 metres at the Ethiopian Championships to finish third with a time of 16:19.30. Almaz Ayana won with a time of 16:11.40, and Kidsan Alema was second with 16:13.48.

=== 2015 ===
On 1 February, she won the junior 6 km race at the Jan Meda International Cross Country in Addis Ababa – Ethiopia's trials for the World Cross Country Championships – with a time of 20:30.

On 28 March, she competed in her first international race outside of Ethiopia at the World Cross Country Championships in Guiyang, China, claiming the world under-20 title on a 6.03 km course in a time of 19:48; together with her Ethiopian teammates Letesenbet also took the team title with a clean individual podium sweep. Just eight days after her 17 birthday, she was the youngest junior women's winner for 15 years.

On 21 June, she won the 5,000 m run in Bottrop, Germany, with a time of 15:39.83. The runner-up was Jana Groß-Hardt in 17:06.33. At first, Letesenbet was disqualified because she had stepped on a marking on the track, and Groß-Hardt stood at the top of the podium during the award ceremony. Letesenbet objected to this decision, reasoning that her misstep had not given her an unfair advantage, and as a result of her appeal, she was reinstated as the winner.

On 15 July, she ran the 3,000 m girls' race at the World U18 Championships in Cali, Colombia, finishing fourth with a time of 9:04.64.

=== 2016 ===
On 22 May, an 18-year-old Letesenbet took victory in the 5,000 metres at the FBK Games in Hengelo, Netherlands, in a time of 14:58.44. On 30 June, she won the event at a track meet in Barcelona with a time of 14:45.63, defeating multiple world record holder Genzebe Dibaba who dropped out after 3,600 m.

=== 2017 ===
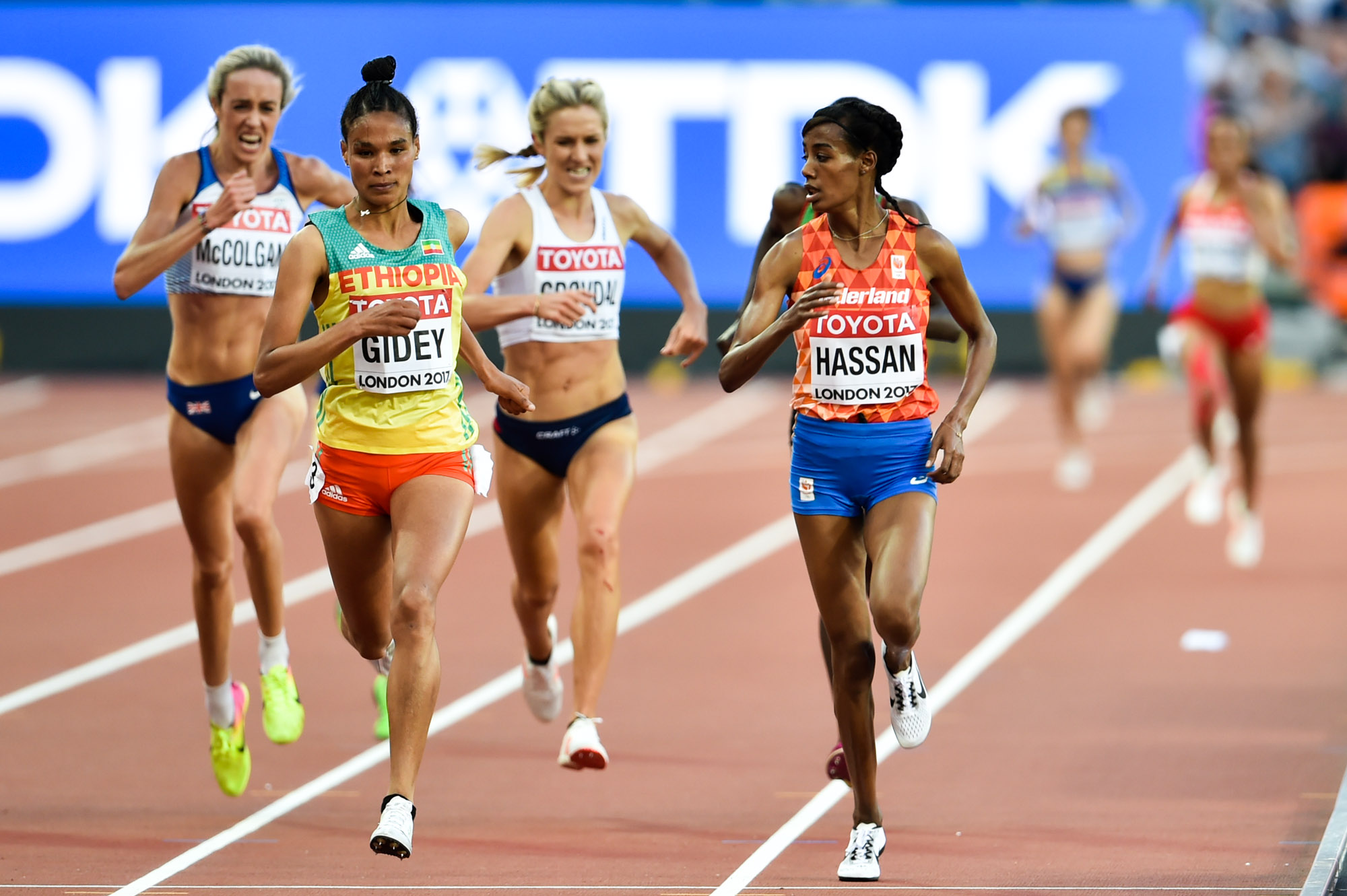
At age 19, Letesenbet (L in yellow) debuted in the World Athletics Championships at the 2017 edition in London, advancing to the 5000 m final.

She won the women's junior race at the Ethiopian Cross Country championships on 13 February in Addis Ababa.

On 26 March, she defended her junior title on a 6 km course at the World Cross Country Championship in Kampala, Uganda.

The then 19-year-old competed in the 5000 m event at the World Championships in London. She advanced to the finals and finished 11th of 14 starters, stopping the clock at 15:04.99. The race was won by Hellen Obiri in a time of 14:34.86, the silver medal went to Almaz Ayana, who ran 14:40.35, and Sifan Hassan was third in 14:42.74.

== Senior career ==
=== 2018 ===
In February, Letesenbet won the 6 km race at the sixth leg of the IAAF Cross Country Permit series taking place in San Vittore Olona, Italy. Her winning time was 18:14. On 26 May, she ran the 5,000 m at the Prefontaine Classic in Eugene, U.S. and placed second in a time of 14:30.29, beating Obiri in third in 14:35.03; Genzebe Dibaba won the race in 14:26.89.

=== 2019: World 10,000 m silver medallist ===
On 10 February, Letesenbet competed in the 10 km run at the Jan Meda Cross Country Championships in Addis Ababa, finishing second with a time of 35:55. The winner of the event was Dera Dida in 35:50.

At the World Cross Country Championships in Aarhus, Denmark, she participated in the senior race. The world 5000 m champion Hellen Obiri took the title on the extremely hilly 10.2 km course with a time of 36:14, Dida was the runner-up in 36:16, and Letesenbet earned the bronze medal by clocking 36:24.

She raced the 10,000 m at the Ethiopian Championships in Addis Ababa on 8 May, winning in a time of 32:10.2. On 19 May, Letesenbet ran the 10 km road race in Bengaluru, India. She placed second, with Agnes Tirop the winner and Senbere Teferi in third place. All three women finished at the same time at 33:55. At the Diamond League Prefontaine Classic meet in Stanford, California on 30 June, she took third place in the 3000 m race with a time of 8:20.27, a new African outdoor best. The winner was Sifan Hassan in 8:18.49, a European record, and Konstanze Klosterhalfen was second in 8:20.07. Seven of the top 15 runners ran personal bests. On 17 July, Letesenbet won the 10,000 m Ethiopian trials on the track in Hengelo, Netherlands in a time of 30:37.89.

At the Diamond League final in Brussels, Letesenbet finished second in the 5000 m with a time of 14:29.54. Hassan won the race in 14:26.26.

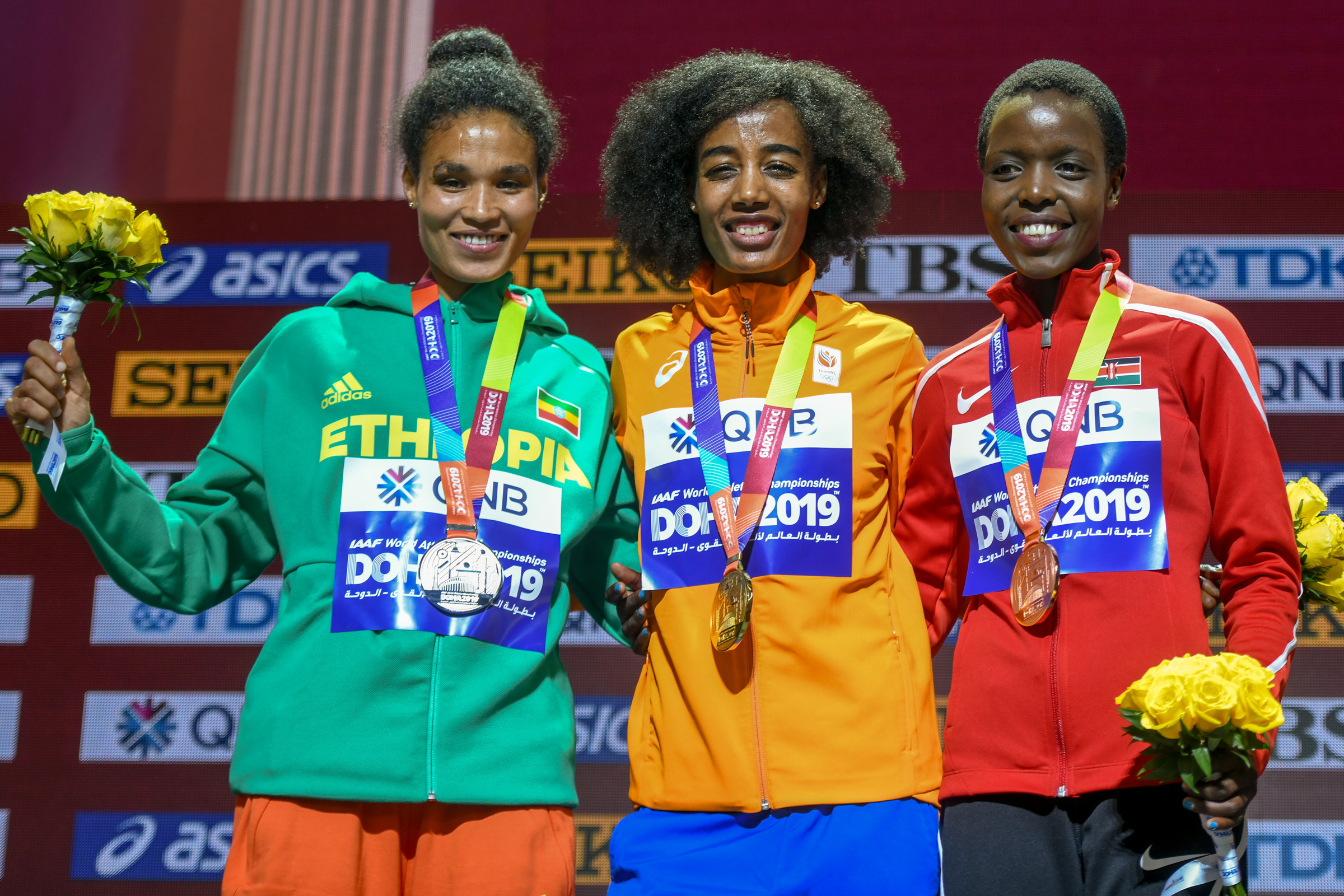
Letesenbet Gidey (L) with her silver on the women's 10,000 m podium at the 2019 World Championships in Doha; Sifan Hassan (C), Agnes Tirop (R).

On 28 September, Letesenbet took the silver medal in the 10,000 m at the World Championships held in Doha, Qatar, with a personal best of 30:21.23. Hassan won the race in a time of 30:17.33, a new Dutch national record, with Agnes Tirop third in 30:25.50.

==== World 15K run record ====
On 17 November 2019, Letesenbet set a new world record of 44m 20s in the 15 km road race at the Zevenheuvelenloop road race in Nijmegen, Netherlands, breaking the 2017 world record held by Joyciline Jepkosgei by one minute and 17 seconds, and becoming the first woman to run 15K under 45 minutes. Letesenbet ran the final 10K in 29:12, the fastest time ever recorded by a woman under any conditions (Almaz Ayana's track world record for 10,000 m was at the time at 29:17.45). Her average pace through 15K was 2:57 per kilometre. She lowered by more than 2 minutes Tirunesh Dibaba's 2009 world record set also at the Zevenheuvelenloop in 46:28, which was, in turn, a 27-second improvement on the former mark at the time. She received a prize of 50,000 euros for her world record.

=== 2020 ===
At the Monaco Diamond League meet on 14 August, Letesenbet was defeated in the 5000 m race by Hellen Obiri, who set a meeting record, 14:26.57 to 14:22.12.

==== World 5000 m record ====
On 7 October 2020, at the NN Valencia World Record Day meet, the 22-year-old broke Tirunesh Dibaba's 2008 record in the 5000 m taking more than 4 seconds off to stop the clock at 14:06.62.

Letesenbet's 5000m world record has since been broken by Faith Kipyegon of Kenya, in a time of 14:05.20, set in June 2023 at the Paris Diamond League. Letesenbet was in this race and finished second to Kipyegon in a season's best time of 14:07.94.

=== 2021: Tokyo Olympic 10,000 m bronze medallist ===
==== World 10,000 m record ====
On 6 June, Sifan Hassan set a 10,000 m world record of 29:06.82. Just two days later, on 8 June, Letesenbet broke Hassan's record at the Ethiopian trials on the same track by more than four seconds with a time of 29:01.03, running the last lap in one minute and three seconds. She was slightly behind the world record pace at the halfway point but began to accelerate after 7000 m. Her time for the second half of the race of 14:18 was the eighth-quickest women's 5000 m time ever run. She became the first woman to hold both the 5000 m and 10,000 m world records since Ingrid Kristiansen from 1986 to 1993.

Gidey's 10,000 m world record has since been broken by Beatrice Chebet of Kenya, who ran 28:54.14 at the 2024 Prefontaine Classic on 25 May.

Racing in the event at the delayed 2020 Tokyo Olympics in August, Letesenbet took the bronze medal, however. After the tactical race, she led on the final bend but was then outsprinted by both Hassan (29:55.32) and Bahrain's Kalkidan Gezahegne (29:56.18) to finish third in 30:01.72.

==== World half marathon record ====
On 24 October 2021, on her half marathon debut, Letesenbet finished in 62m 52s at the Valencia Half Marathon, becoming the first woman to run under 64 minutes (legally) and under 63 minutes, and improving upon previous Ruth Chepng'etich's world record by 70 seconds (52 s upon an unratified mark of Yalemzerf Yehualaw). She reached 10K in 29:45 – the third-fastest clocking in history and just seven seconds off the world record for the distance, and her 15K time was only nine seconds slower than her own world best. Letesenbet's 70-second improvement of the world record was the biggest drop in the women's half marathon since 1978.

=== 2022: World 10,000 m champion ===
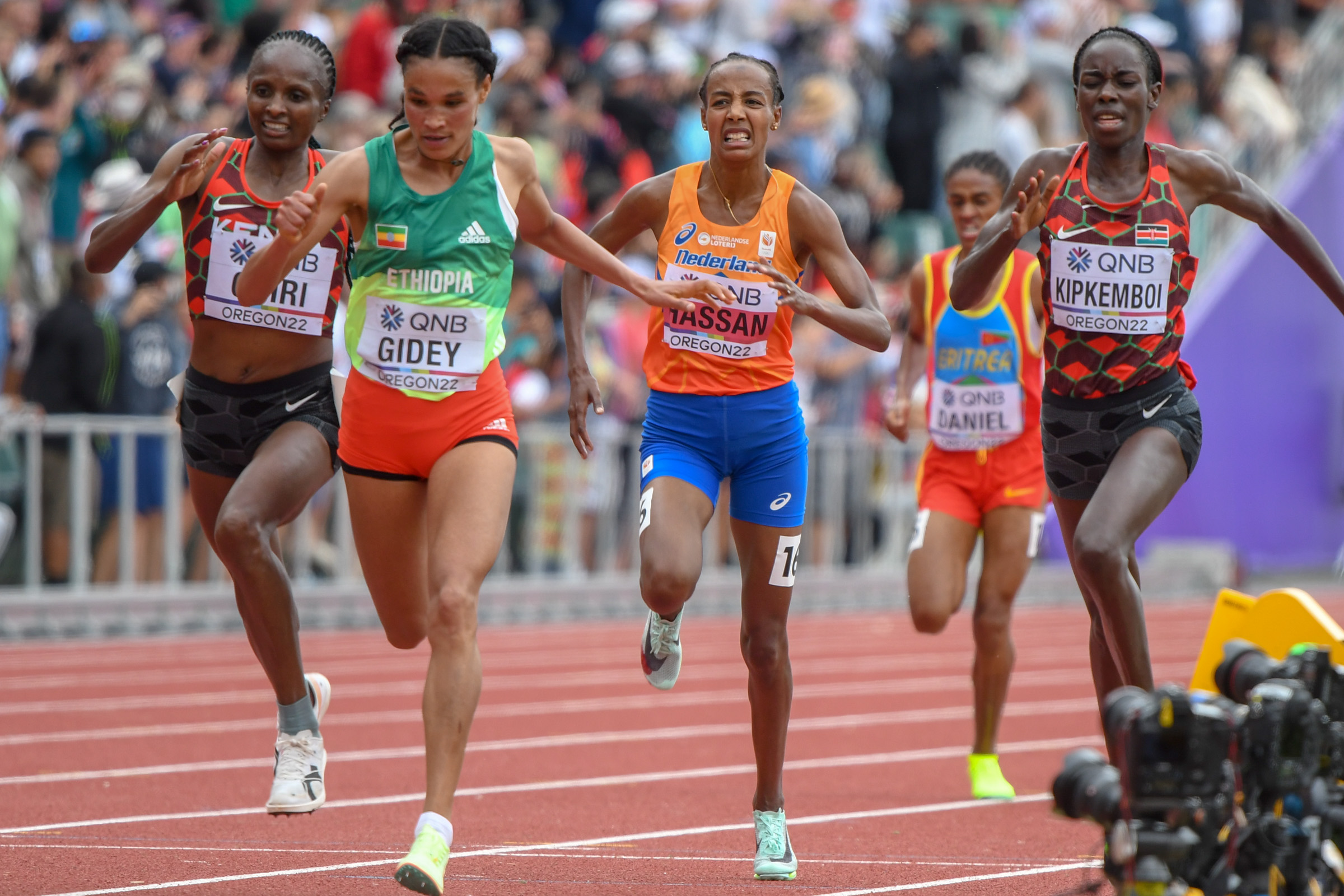
Letesenbet (2nd from the left in green) en route to the 10,000 m title at the 2022 World Athletics Championships in Eugene.

Letesenbet claimed her first senior global title and her first global track title at the World Championships in Eugene, Oregon, in July. She held off a twin Kenyan challenge in a nail-biting finish (the top 3 were only separated by 0.13 s) to win the 10,000 metres gold, achieving a world-leading time of 30:09.94 ahead of Hellen Obiri in 30:10.02 and Margaret Kipkemboi in 30:10.07. Seven days later, she also competed in the 5000 m event and finished fifth.

On her highly anticipated marathon debut at the Valencia Marathon in December, the 24-year-old was initially executing her negative split tactic and gradually accelerated to put herself on world record (2:14:04) pace at 33 km, but eventually faded over the final 7 km quite a bit. She finished second behind Amane Beriso with a time of 2:16:49, setting, however, a record for the fastest ever at the time women's marathon debut and placing sixth on the world all-time list.

=== 2023–present ===
Letesenbet started the year with a win at the Jan Meda Cross Country held in Sululta on 1 January, which doubled as Ethiopia's trial race for the February's World Cross Country Championships in Australia. At the event, she led but faded in the home straight to be overtaken by Beatrice Chebet just metres before the finish line. Letesenbet then stumbled and collapsed, and was eventually disqualified after requiring assistance. At the 2023 World Athletics Championships, Letesenbet won silver in the women's 10,000 metres. Later that year in November, she finished 2nd in the 2023 New York City Marathon, six seconds behind Hellen Obiri. In 2024, after racing one 5000m race at a Diamond League meeting in Suzhou, Letesenbet did not run at the Ethiopian 10,000 metres trial race and was not selected to the Ethiopian team for the 2024 Summer Olympics. In 2025 she gave birth to a son.

== Achievements ==
All information from World Athletics profile.

=== Personal bests ===
Surface	Event	Time (h:)m:s	Venue	Date	Notes
Track	1500 metres	4:11.11	Hérouville-Saint-Clair, France	15 June 2017	
Track	3000 metres	8:20.27	Stanford, CA, United States	30 June 2019	
Track	5000 metres	14:06.62	Valencia, Spain	7 October 2020	National Record
Track	10,000 metres	29:01.03	Hengelo, Netherlands	8 June 2021	National Record
Road	10K run	33:55	Bengaluru, India	19 May 2019	
Road	15K run	44:20	Nijmegen, Netherlands	17 November 2019	World best
Road	Half marathon	1:02:52	Valencia, Spain	24 October 2021	Mx World record
Road	Marathon	2:16:49	Valencia, Spain	4 December 2022	fastest women's debut, #6th of all time

=== International competitions ===
Year	Competition	Venue	Position	Event	Result	Notes
Representing Ethiopia
2015	World Cross Country Championships	Guiyang, China	1st	Junior race	19:48	
2015	World Cross Country Championships	Guiyang, China	1st	Junior team	11 pts	
2015	World Youth Championships	Cali, Colombia	4th	3000 m	9:04.64	PB
2017	World Cross Country Championships	Kampala, Uganda	1st	Junior race	18:34	
2017	World Cross Country Championships	Kampala, Uganda	1st	Junior team	19 pts	
2017	World Championships	London, United Kingdom	11th	5000 m	15:04.99	
2019	World Cross Country Championships	Aarhus, Denmark	3rd	Senior race	36:24	
2019	World Cross Country Championships	Aarhus, Denmark	1st	Senior team	21 pts	
2019	World Championships	Doha, Qatar	2nd	10,000 m	30:21.23	PB
2021	Olympic Games	Tokyo, Japan	3rd	10,000 m	30:01.72	
2022	World Championships	Eugene, OR, United States	5th	5000 m	14:47.98	
2022	World Championships	Eugene, OR, United States	1st	10,000 m	30:09.94	WL
2023	World Cross Country Championships	Bathurst, Australia	–	Senior race	DQ	
2023	World Championships	Budapest, Hungary	2nd	10,000 m	31:28.16	SB
Road races representing NN Running Team
2019	World 10K Bangalore	Bangalore, India	2nd	10 km	33:55	
2019	Zevenheuvelenloop	Nijmegen, Netherlands	1st	15 km	44:20	WB
2021	Valencia Half Marathon	Valencia, Spain	1st	Half marathon	1:02:52	WR
2022	Valencia Marathon	Valencia, Spain	2nd	Marathon	2:16:49	#6th of all time
2023	New York City Marathon	New York City	2nd	Marathon	2:27:29	

=== National championships ===
- Ethiopian Athletics Championships
  - 10,000 metres: 2019

Records
Preceded by (Ethiopia) Tirunesh Dibaba	Women's 5000 m World Record Holder; 7 October 2020 – 9 June 2023	Succeeded by (Kenya) Faith Kipyegon
Preceded by (Netherlands) Sifan Hassan	Women's 10,000 m World record holder 8 June 2021 – 25 May 2024	Succeeded by (Kenya) Beatrice Chebet
Preceded by (Kenya) Ruth Chepng'etich	Women's Half marathon World record holder 24 October 2021 – present	Succeeded by Incumbent
