= Bosnia and Herzegovina at the 2015 World Championships in Athletics =

- WA code: BIH
- National federation: Athletic Federation of Bosnia and Herzegovina

in Beijing
- Competitors: 3 (3 men) in 2 events
- Medals Ranked 32nd: Gold 0 Silver 0 Bronze 1 Total 1

World Championships in Athletics appearances (overview)
- 1993; 1995; 1997; 1999; 2001; 2003; 2005; 2007; 2009; 2011; 2013; 2015; 2017; 2019; 2022; 2023; 2025

Other related appearances
- Yugoslavia (1983–1991)

Bosnia and Herzegovina competed at the 2015 World Championships in Athletics in Beijing, China, from 22–30 August 2015.

== Medalists ==
Medal	Athlete	Event	Date
Bronze	Amel Tuka	Men's 800 metres	25 August

== Results ==
=== Men ===
Track and road events

Athlete	Event	Heat		Semifinal		Final	
Athlete	Event	Result	Rank	Result	Rank	Result	Rank
Amel Tuka	800 metres	1:46.12	5 Q	1.44.84	1 Q	1:46.30	3rd place, bronze medalist(s)

Field events

Athlete	Event	Qualification		Final	
Athlete	Event	Distance	Position	Distance	Position
Hamza Alić	Shot put	18.62	28	Did not advance	
Kemal Mešić	Shot put	DNS		Did not advance	

== See also ==
- Bosnia and Herzegovina at the World Championships in Athletics
