= Bosnia and Herzegovina at the 2005 World Championships in Athletics =

- WA code: BIH
- National federation: Athletic Federation of Bosnia and Herzegovina

in Helsinki, Finland
- Competitors: 1 (1 man)
- Medals: Gold 0 Silver 0 Bronze 0 Total 0

World Championships in Athletics appearances (overview)
- 1993; 1995; 1997; 1999; 2001; 2003; 2005; 2007; 2009; 2011; 2013; 2015; 2017; 2019; 2022; 2023; 2025

Other related appearances
- Yugoslavia (1983–1991)

Bosnia and Herzegovina competed at the 2005 World Championships in Athletics from 6 – 14 August 2005.

== Results ==
=== Men ===
Field Events

Athletes	Event	Qualification		Final	
Athletes	Event	Result	Rank	Result	Rank
Hamza Alić	Shot put	18.77	11	did not advance	

== See also ==
- Bosnia and Herzegovina at the World Championships in Athletics
