= Bosnia and Herzegovina at the 2003 World Championships in Athletics =

- WA code: BIH
- National federation: Athletic Federation of Bosnia and Herzegovina

in Paris, France
- Competitors: 1 (1 man)
- Medals: Gold 0 Silver 0 Bronze 0 Total 0

World Championships in Athletics appearances (overview)
- 1993; 1995; 1997; 1999; 2001; 2003; 2005; 2007; 2009; 2011; 2013; 2015; 2017; 2019; 2022; 2023; 2025

Other related appearances
- Yugoslavia (1983–1991)

Bosnia and Herzegovina competed at the 2003 World Championships in Athletics from 23 – 31 August 2003.

== Results ==
=== Men ===
Athlete	Event	Heat		Semifinal		Final	
Athlete	Event	Result	Rank	Result	Rank	Result	Rank
Jasmin Salihović	800 m	1:48.10	5	did not advance			

== See also ==
- Bosnia and Herzegovina at the World Championships in Athletics
