= Bosnia and Herzegovina at the World Athletics Championships =

- WA code: BIH
- National federation: Athletic Federation of Bosnia and Herzegovina
- Medals Ranked 86th: Gold 0 Silver 1 Bronze 1 Total 2

World Athletics Championships appearances (overview)
- 1993; 1995; 1997; 1999; 2001; 2003; 2005; 2007; 2009; 2011; 2013; 2015; 2017; 2019; 2022; 2023; 2025

Other related appearances
- Yugoslavia (1983–1991)

Bosnia and Herzegovina has participated in the World Athletics Championships since the early 1990s; after Bosnia and Herzegovina independence from the Socialist Federal Republic of Yugoslavia. Kada Delić was the first Bosnian athlete to appear at the World Championships in Athletics.

Their first ever medal was Bronze and was won by Amel Tuka in 2015 Beijing; in the Men's 800 metres discipline.

== Medalists ==
Medal	Name	Year	Event
Bronze	Amel Tuka	2015 Beijing	Men's 800 metres
Silver	Amel Tuka	2019 Doha	Men's 800 metres

=== By event ===
Event	Gold	Silver	Bronze	Total
800 metres	0	1	1	2
Totals (1 entries)	0	1	1	2

=== By gender ===
Gender	Gold	Silver	Bronze	Total
Men	0	1	1	2
Women	0	0	0	0

== Competitors by event ==
The following is a list of the total number of competitors by event in the World Championships.

Event	Men	Women	Total
10 kilometres race walk	0	2	2
400 metres	0	2	2
800 metres	7	0	7
High jump	3	0	3
Marathon	2	2	4
Shot put	14	0	14
Total	25	6	31

== See also ==
- Bosnian and Herzegovinian records in athletics
- Bosnia and Herzegovina at the Olympics
- Bosnia and Herzegovina at the Paralympics
