= National records in the 5000 metres =

The following table is an overview of national records in the 5000 metres.

== Outdoor ==
=== Men ===
Country	Time	Athlete	Date	Place	Ref.
Uganda	12:35.36	Joshua Cheptegei	14 August 2020	Monaco	R1
Ethiopia	12:36.73	Hagos Gebrhiwet	30 May 2024	Oslo	R1
Kenya	12:39.74	Daniel Komen	22 August 1997	Brussels	R1
Sweden	12:44.27	Andreas Almgren	15 June 2025	Stockholm	
Spain	12:45.01	Mohamed Katir	21 July 2023	Monaco	R1
Bahrain	12:45.70	Birhanu Balew	5 September 2026	Brussels	
Great Britain	12:46.59	George Mills	12 June 2025	Oslo	
Burundi	12:46.73	Egide Ntakarutimana	5 September 2026	Brussels	
United States	12:46.96	Grant Fisher	2 September 2022	R1 Brussels	
Canada	12:47.20	Mohammed Ahmed	10 July 2020	Portland	R1
Norway	12:48.45	Jakob Ingebrigtsen	10 June 2021	Florence	R1
Morocco	12:49.28	Brahim Lahlafi	25 August 2000	Brussels	R1
Belgium	12:49.71	Mohammed Mourhit	25 August 2000	Brussels	R1
Guatemala	12:50.58	Luis Grijalva	30 May 2024	Oslo	R1
Australia	12:50.82	Ky Robinson	10 June 2026	Oslo	
Algeria	12:50.86	Ali Saïdi-Sief	30 June 2000	Rome	R1
Switzerland	12:50.87	Dominic Lokinyomo Lobalu (Note: Lobalu represented South Sudan until 7 September 2023 and Switzerland starting on 10 May 2023.)	12 June 2025	Oslo	
France	12:51.59	Jimmy Gressier	20 June 2025	Paris	
Qatar	12:51.98	Saif Saeed Shaheen	14 July 2006	Rome	R1
South Sudan	12:52.15	Dominic Lokinyomo Lobalu	2 September 2022	Brussels	
Germany	12:53.63	Mohamed Abdilaahi	11 July 2025	Fontvieille	
Djibouti	12:56.12	Waberi Igueh Houssein	1 August 2026	Oordegem	
South Africa	12:56.67	Adriaan Wildschutt	30 May 2024	Oslo	R1
Eritrea	12:57.22	Habtom Samuel	23 May 2026	Los Angeles	
Mexico	12:58.57	Eduardo Herrera	24 May 2025	Los Angeles	
Saudi Arabia	12:58.58	Mukhlid Al-Otaibi	23 July 2005	Heusden-Zolder	R1
Uruguay	12:59.26	Santiago Catrofe	20 June 2025	Paris	
Turkey	13:00.31	Ali Kaya	4 June 2015	Rome	R1
Ireland	13:01.40	Brian Fay	15 July 2023	Heusden-Zolder	R1
Italy	13:02.26	Yemaneberhan Crippa	8 September 2020	Ostravo	R1
Netherlands	13:02.43	Mike Foppen	15 June 2025	Stockholm	
Portugal	13:02.86	António Pinto	12 August 1998	Zürich	R1
Tanzania	13:03.62	John Yuda Msuri	12 July 2002	Rome	R1
India	13:03:93	Gulveer Singh	23 May 2026	Los Angeles, USA	R1
New Zealand	13:04.33	Geordie Beamish	26 January 2024	Boston	R1
Japan	13:08.40	Suguru Osako	18 July 2015	Heusden-Zolder	R1
Scotland	13:08.61	Andrew Butchart	20 August 2016	Rio de Janeiro	
Azerbaijan	13:09.17	Hayle Ibrahimov	28 August 2014	Zürich	R1
Ukraine	13:10.78	Serhiy Lebid	6 September 2002	Berlin	R1
Rwanda	13:11.29	Mathias Ntawulikuri	9 June 1992	Rome	R1
Argentina	13:11.57	Federico Bruno	21 April 2023	Palo Alto	R1
Russia	13:11.95	Vladimir Nikitin	24 July 2021	Dolgoprudny	R1
Serbia	13:13.06	Elzan Bibić	9 August 2025	Oordegem	
Bulgaria	13:13.15	Evgeni Ignatov	31 August 1986	Stuttgart	R1
Austria	13:13.44	Günther Weidlinger	22 July 2005	London	R1
Tunisia	13:13.94	Féthi Baccouche	4 July 1987	Oslo	R1
Zimbabwe	13:14.50	Phillimon Hanneck	8 June 1994	Rome	R1
Denmark	13:14.98	Joel Ibler Lillesø	9 August 2025	Oordegem	
Romania	13:15.0 h	Ilie Floroiu	23 July 1978	Bucharest	R1
Thailand	13:15.67; 13:08.41 i	Kieran Tuntivate	15 July 2023; 12 February 2022	Heusden-Zolder; Boston	R2
Finland	13:16.3 h 13:16.02 X	Lasse Virén; Martti Vainio	14 September 1972; 28 June 1984	Helsinki; Oslo	R1
Israel	13:16.88	Tadesse Getahon	19 July 2025	Heusden-Zolder	
Estonia	13:17.20	Enn Sellik	28 June 1976	Podolsk	R2
Belarus	13:17.66	Aleksandr Fedotkin	10 July 1979	Budapest	R2
Poland	13:17.69	Bronisław Malinowski	5 July 1976	Stockholm	R1
Lithuania	13:17.9 h	Aleksandras Antipovas	9 June 1979	Sochi	R2
Slovakia	13:19.40	Róbert Štefko	1 June 1995	Saint Denis	R1
Brazil	13:19.43	Marílson dos Santos	8 June 2006	Kassel	R1
Iceland	13:20.34	Baldvin Magnússon	30 April 2024	Huelva	R1
Jamaica	13:20.39; 13:14.45 i	Kemoy Campbell	2 May 2015; 26 February 2017	Palo Alto; Boston	R2
Colombia	13:21.31	Gerard Giraldo	2 May 2019	Palo Alto	R1
Lesotho	13:21.68	Namakwe Nkhasi	26 June 2016	Durban	R1
Venezuela	13:22.30	Freddy González	3 July 2004	San Sebastián	R1
Somalia	13:22.38	Abdullahi Jama Mahamed	16 May 2025	Doha	
Peru	13:23.20	David Torrence (Note: David Torrence transferred his allegiance from the USA to Peru on 2 June 2016, so that his personal best of 13:16.53 of April 2012 is not a Peruvian record.)	17 August 2016	Rio de Janeiro	
Chile	13:23.68	Mauricio Díaz	14 July 2001	Heusden-Zolder	R1
Ecuador	13:23.72	Bayron Piedra	22 July 2012	Ninove	R1
Czech Republic	13:24.99	Jiří Sýkora	1 August 1980	Moscow	R2
China	13:25.14	Xia Fengyuan	23 October 1997	Shanghai	R1
Zambia	13:25.25	Obed Mutanya	18 August 2001	San Sebastián	R1
Hungary	13:26.96	Balázs Csillag	20 July 2002	Heusden-Zolder	R1
Sudan	13:27.09; 13:20.61 (Note: Sudanese-born Jamal Abdelmaji has represented the Athlete Refugee Team.)	Mohamed Yagoub; Jamal Abdelmaji Eisa Mohammed	23 June 2001; 22 June 2024	Solihull; Vienna	R1
Greece	13:28.59	Panagiotis Stroubakos	11 June 1995	Turku	R1
Malta	13:29.17; 13:24.05 i	Jordan Gusman (Note: Australian-born Gusman ran his personal best of 13:21.35 on 2 May 2019, a few weeks before he transferred his allegiance to Malta on 21 August 2019.)	3 July 2021; 12 February 2022	Heusden-Zolder; Boston	R2
Botswana	13:29.6 h	Matthews Motshwarateu	14 April 1978	Stellenbosch	R1
Georgia	13:30.88	Oleg Strizhakov (Note: Born in Tbilisi, Strizhakov represented Georgia until the collapse of the Soviet Union, after which he represented Russia. His personal best time 13:29.08 set in July 1993 is therefore not a Georgian record.)	23 June 1984	Kyiv	R2
Ghana	13:30.99	William Amponsah	27 March 2025	Raleigh	
Puerto Rico	13:31.69	Joseph Rosa	June 13, 2014	Eugene	R1
Cuba	13:32.35 (Note: World Athletics includes Medina's 13:32.35 without asterisks in their database, but listed his 13:44.8 as Cuba's national record in their 2022 statistics handbook.); 13:44.8 h	Luis Medina	21 May 1976; 21 June 1977	Cologne; Prague	R1; R2
Slovenia	13:32.8 h	Peter Svet	12 June 1974	Berlin	R2
Philippines	13:33.13	Yacine Guermali	9 June 2024	Portland	
Palestine	13:33.41	Mohammed Baket	19 July 1997	Hechtel-Eksel	R1
Kyrgyzstan	13:34.2 h	Vadim Mochalov	13 May 1976	Sochi	R2
Latvia	13:34.2 h	Juris Grustiņš	18 July 1971	Moscow	R2
Cyprus	13:34.29	Filippos Filippou	27 August 1983	Riccione	R1
Libya	13:34.99; 13:34.32 i	Ali Mabrouk El Zaidi; Mohamed Hrezi	5 August 2000; 12 February 2022	Heusden-Zolder; Boston	R2
Kazakhstan	13:35.64	Sergey Navolokin	22 August 1982	Podolsk	R2
Iran	13:35.71 (Note: Abootorabi represented his home country of Iran until 13 June 2022, when his allegiance was transferred to Sweden. World Athletics considers this time set on 21 May 2022 as Iran's national record, but the Athletic Federation of Iran neither this nor his indoor time of 13:38.88 set 12 March 2022 in Sollentuna. Abootorabi's personal best so far on the 5000 m of 13:30.05 in Heusden-Zolder was set on 2 July 2022 representing Sweden.); 13:50.08	Mohammadreza Abootorabi; Seyed Amir Zamanpour	21 May 2022; 18 May 2024	Stockholm; İzmir	R2
Dominica	13:35.86	Steve Agar	18 April 1998	Walnut	R1
Croatia	13:37.76	Dalibor Balgač	19 April 2003	Walnut	R1
Luxembourg	13:38.51	Justin Gloden	3 June 1983	Leuven	R1
Angola	13:40.12	Aurélio Miti	11 August 1995	Gothenburg	R2
Uzbekistan	13:41.0 h	Ashur Normuradov	19 August 1975	Podolsk	R2
South Korea	13:42.98	Baek Seung-ho	17 July 2010	Abashiri	R1
Eswatini	13:43.52	Sipho Dlamini	23 April 1994	Durban	R2
Costa Rica	13:44.99	Eric Quiros	27 May 2000	Victoria	R2
Namibia	13:46.91	Luketz Swartbooi	12 March 1994	Fullerton	R2
Chad	13:47.44	Onessime Rondouba	26 June 2024	Douala	R1
Moldova	13:47.6 h	Igor Braslavskiy	25 August 1983	Chişinău	R2
Congo DR	13:49.69	Patrick Tambwé	12 July 2001	Sotteville	R2
United Arab Emirates	13:49.74	Mohamed Ahmed Amer	4 December 1993	Manila	R2
Congo Republic	13:50.86	Alex Ngouari-Mouissi	6 July 2024	Maisons-Laffitte	R1
Armenia	13:53.0 h	Artashes Mikoyan	30 May 1976	Munich	R2
Egypt	13:53.03	Salem Mohamed Attiaallah	14 September 2022	Maadi	R1
Paraguay	13:53.20	Derlis Ayala	20 April 2018	Torrance	R1
Cape Verde	13:53.36	Samuel Freire	25 May 2024	Brussels	R1
North Korea	13:53.9 h	Ryu Ok-Hyon	13 May 1987	Pyongyang	R1
Chinese Taipei	13:54.42	Wu Wen-chien	10 October 2002	Busan	R2
North Macedonia	13:54.58	Dario Ivanovski	3 July 2022	Oran	R1
Turkmenistan	13:55.45	Marly Sopyev	6 July 1995	Saint Petersburg	R2
Bolivia	13:57.80 A	Vidal Basco	26 May 2019	Lima	R2
Haiti	13:58.44	Mark Allen	15 April 2016	Norwalk	
Bosnia and Herzegovina	14:00.2 h	Bilko Kačar	13 April 1980	Nova Gorica	R2
Bahamas	14:00.54 (Note: Ratified by the national federation but not by World Athletics, though they do list 14:00.54 as a personal best time for Williams); 14:33.99	O'Neil Williams; Gabriel Curtis	14 May 2011; 2 April 2021	Nassau; Gainesville	R2
Iraq	14:00.56	Mohammed Abdullah Mahal	5 June 2021	Bursa	R2
Indonesia	14:02.12	Agus Prayogo	23 July 2011	Rio de Janeiro	
Comoros	14:02.2 h	Mohamed Ahmed	7 June 1995	Marignane	R2
Panama	14:03.30	Didier Rodríguez	20 May 2026	Nerja	
Vietnam	14:04.82	Nguyễn Văn Lai	9 June 2015	Kallang	
Nepal	14:04.89; 14:01.19 X	Rajendra Bahadur Bhandari	25 August 2004; 25 August 2006	Athens; Colombo	
Andorra	14:05.16	Nahuel Carabaña	3 June 2023	Marsa	
Mauritania	14:05.58	Mohamed Elbendir Kathari	28 May 2005	Avilés	R2
Malaysia	14:06.84	Ramachandran Murusamy	5 August 1994	Troisdorf	R2
Guyana	14:07.08	Cleveland Forde	10 November 2006	Buenos Aires	R2
Dominican Republic	14:07.38; 14:01.05 # (Note: Time not accepted due to illegal pacing)	Alvaro Abreu	21 May 2021; 17 April 2021	New York City; San Juan	R2
Tajikistan	14:07.44	Sergey Davidov	20 June 1983	Moscow	R2
Jordan	14:07.46	Awad Al-Hasini	16 October 1994	Hiroshima	R2
Madagascar	14:07.50	Fulgence Rakotondrasoa	17 June 2006	Rabat	R2
Malawi	14:08.0 hA	Rodwell Kamwendo	1 July 2000	Harare	R2
Cayman Islands	14:08.09	Jon Rankin	11 March 2011	Los Angeles	
Pakistan	14:08.4 h	Muhammad Younis	22 July 1977	Troisdorf	R2
Mauritius	14:08.90	Mike Félicité	15 June 1994	Saint-Maur-des-Fossés	R2
New Caledonia	14:09.2	Alain Lazare	23 May 1987	Nouméa	
U.S. Virgin Islands	14:10.83; 14:06.17 i	Eduardo Garcia	28 April 2016; 12 February 2016	Philadelphia; Ames	R2
Gambia	14:11.13	Nfamara Njie	18 October 2020	Modena	R2
Myanmar	14:11.28	Gopal Thein Win	4 December 1993	Manila	R2
Trinidad and Tobago	14:12.01	Ronnie Holassie	20 June 1999	Port of Spain	R2
Albania	14:12.6	Isuf Curri	31 May 1990	Elbasan	
Mongolia	14:12.86	Ser-Od Bat-Ochir	3 April 2021	Toyota	R2
Lebanon	14:13.13	Zayed el Sayed	28 November 2024	Melbourne	
Oman	14:14.06	Qais Salim Al-Mahrooqi	25 June 2011	Casablanca	R2
Nigeria	14:15.50	Timon Gunem	19 June 1993	Lagos	R2
Kuwait	14:16.26	Abdulrahman Al-Kandary	18 May 2022	Kuwait City	
Kosovo	14:18.0 h #	Ismet Rushiti	8 April 1982	Vukovar	R2
Central African Republic	14:18.3 h	Christian Yago	19 June 1996	Saint-Maur-des-Fossés	R2
Aruba	14:18.31	Kimball Reynierse	8 May 1986	Leiden	R2
Gibraltar	14:18.4 h	John Charvetto	31 August 1978	Prague	R2
Cameroon	14:18.4 h	Adamou Aboubakar	15 July 1995	Yaoundé	R2
Equatorial Guinea	14:18.46	Benjamín Enzema	23 June 2018	Blois	R2
Sri Lanka	14:08.5 h	Kathan A. Chandradas	20 February 2004	Colombo	R2
Barbados	14:20.2 h	Leo Garnes	5 June 1992	Bridgetown	R2
El Salvador	14:20.69; 14:18.01 i	Carlos Santos	19 May 2023; 28 January 2022	New York; New York	R2
Sierra Leone	14:20.9 h	Hilton Gooding	22 March 1985	Freetown	R2
Niger	14:21.4 h	Inni Aboubacar	6 July 1983	Saint-Maur-des-Fossés	R2
Mozambique	14:21.53	Flavio Sehohle	28 May 2021	Durban	R2
Seychelles	14:22.30 A	Simon Labiche	23 May 2003	Nairobi	R2
Fiji	14:22.50	Yeshnil Karan	5 March 2025	Box Hill	
Belize	14:22.93	Patrick Fuller	22 April 2005	Eugene	R2
Syria	14:23.04	Salah Moustapha Habib	14 June 1990	Algiers	R2
Mali	14:23.2 h	Youssouf Diallo	20 July 1997	Cotonou	R2
Bermuda	14:23.35; 14:16.67 i	Lamont Marshall	24 March 2017; 26 January 2019	Raleigh; Boston	R2
Cambodia	14:24.71	Hem Bunting	7 December 2007	Nakhon Ratchasima	
Saint Lucia	14:25.20	Zepherinus Joseph	20 July 2001	Ottawa	R2
Yemen	14:26.38	Mohamed Aziz	20 April 2018	Stanford	R2
Ivory Coast	14:28.6 h	Pierre Kouabénan	23 April 1988	Abidjan	R2
Montenegro	14:29.43	Osman Erović	10 May 1987	Nova Gorica	R2
Burkina Faso	14:29.58	Abdifatah Mohamed Nour	17 March 2023	Djibouti	
Senegal	14:29.7 h	Moussa Bâ	4 April 1991	Dakar	R2
Saint Vincent and the Grenadines	14:31.5 h	Pamenos Ballantyne	14 June 1998	London	R2
Timor-Leste	14:35.17	Aries José Pariera	22 August 1997	Jakarta	R2
Hong Kong	14:35.37	Wesley Chan Wai Chung	30 November 2024	Yokohama	
Monaco	14:48.2 h 14:39.0 # (Note: Battaglia's personal best of 14:39.0 was achieved in a training trial and is not accepted as a national record.)	Emile Battaglia	13 June 1948; 11 August 1946	Marseille; Monaco	
Guam	14:39.84	Neil Weare	19 April 2002	Claremont	
Togo	14:41.37	Moipah Kombate	21 July 2019	Niamey	
French Polynesia	14:41.6 h	Pascal Adams	31 July 1988	Saint-Maur-des-Fossés	
Papua New Guinea	14:43.4 h	John Kokinai	10 September 1972	Rabaul	
San Marino	14:43.5 h	Gian Luigi Macina	4 July 1996	Bologna	R2
Honduras	14:43.87	Ramón Romero	14 April 2022	Azusa	
Singapore	14:44.21	Soh Rui Yong	17 July 2021	Singapore	R2
Guinea	14:45.03	Alkhassane Kaké Makanéra	23 May 2021	Tours	R2
Nicaragua	14:46.5 h	William Aguirre	9 February 1989	Havana	R2
Bangladesh	14:47.19	Mohamed Eliysuddin	21 December 1995	Madras	R2
Benin	14:49.1 h	Imorou Zato	31 May 1998	Niamey	R2
Netherlands Antilles	14:49.6 h	Ronald Mercelina	3 March 1970	Panama City	R2
Suriname	14:50.22	Johnny Morgenthaler	10 July 2010	Heusden-Zolder	
Gabon	14:53.36	Jean-Marc Léandro	7 June 2008	Cannes	R2
Grenada	14:58.23	Maurice Williams	20 April 1981	Nassau	R2
Liechtenstein	15:07.8 h	Hugo Walser	27 May 1965	Aarau	R2
Vanuatu	15:08.1 h	Tawai Keiruan	25 July 1997	Port Vila	R2
Laos	15:10.2 h	Kainchanh	6 November 2000	Vientiane	R2
São Tomé and Príncipe	15:10.2 h	Gil Quintas	4 August 2013	Folha Fede	R2
Antigua and Barbuda	15:13.4 h (Note: Antiguan William Richards seemed to have set a time of 14:41.39 on 17 June 2000 in Port of Spain, but he was one lap short.)	Dale Jones	11 July 1988	Bridgetown	R2
Bhutan	15:16.84 A	Gawa Zangpo (Note: A time of 14:33.43 run in April 2019 in Doha, which is still listed in the World Athletics database as a national record, is labeled as "one lap short" in their 2022 Statistics Handbook)	6 December 2019	Kathmandu	R2
British Virgin Islands	15:22.0 h	Anderson Legair	12 April 1997	Knoxville	R2
Liberia	15:28.5 h	Faraj Anis	14 May 2017	Conakry	
Brunei	15:28.9 h	B.J.R. Keneenthep	15 July 1973	Bandar Seri Begawan	R2
Maldives	15:30.27	Hussain Fazeel Haroon	24 April 2019	Doha	R2
Macau	15:33.41 (Note: By World Athletics source; 15:23.00 by federation source)	Lei Hong Wa	31 May 1992	Banciao	R2
Solomon Islands	15:33.8 h	Chris Votu	27 April 2003	Lae	
Samoa	15:42.62	Aunese Curreen	6 September 2007	Apia	
Guinea-Bissau	15:45.45	Mussa Djau	19 June 2013	Beja	R2
Wallis and Futuna	15:49.8 h	Angélo Pétélo	7 November 1987	Nouméa	
Afghanistan	15:52.68	Aman Haidari	6 August 2010	Ravnanger	R2
Saint Kitts and Nevis	15:57.9 h	Charles Morton	7 April 1984	Charlotte Amalie	R2
Turks and Caicos Islands	16:05.51	Martijn Healy	20 May 2022	Wageningen	R2
American Samoa	16:32.4 h	John Wasco	10 April 1992	Utulei	
Cook Islands	16:41.7 h	Jubilee Reu	12 June 1971	Avarua	
Kiribati	16:42.7 h	Teinakewe Tamuera	6 February 1998	Adelaide	
Anguilla	16:45.79	Michael Gumbs	23 April 2000	St. George's	R2
Micronesia	16:52.84	Bentura Rodríguez	20 August 1995	Pirae	
Northern Mariana Islands	16:55.52	Stuart Smith	June 7, 1999	Santa Rita	
Marshall Islands	17:01.59	Elisha Woodall	24 June 2014	Nikao	R2
Tonga	17:07.6 h	Peau'afi Houkinima	13 September 1971	Pirae	
Montserrat	17:16.34	Herman Lewis	4 May 1991	Castries	R2
Norfolk Island	17:41.3 h	Graeme Donaldson	7 April 1990	Middlegate	
Palau	18:18.74	Cristian Etpison Nicolescu	17 July 2018	Abay	R2
Nauru	18:29.8 h	Karl Teabuge	18 August 1969	Port Moresby	
Niue	20:01.2 h	Palana Ahotala	12 September 1983	Apia	

=== Women ===
Country	Time	Athlete	Date	Place	Ref.
Kenya	13:58.06	Beatrice Chebet	5 July 2025	Eugene	
Ethiopia	14:00.21	Gudaf Tsegay	17 September 2023	Eugene	R3
Netherlands	14:13.42	Sifan Hassan	23 July 2023	London	R3
United States	14:19.45	Alicia Monson	23 July 2023	London	R3
Italy	14:23.15	Nadia Battocletti	6 June 2025	Rome	
Russia	14:23.75	Liliya Shobukhova	19 July 2008	Kazan	R3
Turkey	14:24.68	Elvan Abeylegesse	11 June 2004	Bergen	R3
Burundi	14:25.34	Francine Niyonsaba	3 September 2021	Brussels	R3
Germany	14:26.76	Konstanze Klosterhalfen	3 August 2019	Berlin	R3
China	14:28.09	Jiang Bo	23 October 1997	Shanghai	R3
Great Britain	14:28.55	Eilish McColgan	1 July 2021	Oslo	R3
Japan	14:29.18	Nozomi Tanaka	8 September 2023	Brussels	R3
Bahrain	14:30.06	Winfred Yavi	4 June 2026	Roma	
Norway	14:31.07	Karoline Bjerkeli Grøvdal	16 June 2022	Oslo	R3
Australia	14:31.45	Rose Davies	19 July 2025	London	
Romania	14:31.48	Gabriela Szabo	1 September 1998	Berlin	R3
Morocco	14:32.08	Zahra Ouaziz	1 September 1998	Berlin	R3
Spain	14:33.40	Marta García	22 August 2025	Brussels	
Portugal	14:36.45	Fernanda Ribeiro	22 July 1995	Hechtel	R3
Venezuela	14:36.59	Joselyn Daniely Brea	17 May 2024	Los Angeles	R3
Eritrea	14:36.66	Rahel Daniel	27 May 2022	Eugene	R3
Belgium	14:37.47	Jana Van Lent	22 August 2025	Brussels	
Uganda	14:39.38	Charity Cherop	16 May 2026	Shaoxing	
Ireland	14:41.02	Sonia O'Sullivan	25 September 2000	Sydney	R3
Tanzania	14:43.87	Zakia Mrisho Mohamed	13 August 2005	Helsinki	R3
France	14:43.90	Margaret Maury	3 September 2004	Brussels	R3
Mexico	14:43.94	Laura Galván	23 August 2023	Budapest	R3
South Africa	14:44.05	Elana Meyer	22 July 1995	Hechtel	R3
Canada	14:44.12; 14:31.38 i	Gabriela DeBues-Stafford	6 September 2019; 11 February 2022	Brussels; Boston	R3 R4
Finland	14:44.72	Nathalie Blomqvist	7 June 2024	Rome	R3
Kazakhstan	14:45.69	Daisy Jepkemei	2 June 2022	Montreuil	R3
New Zealand	14:45.93; 14:39.89 i	Kimberley Smith	11 July 2008; 27 February 2009	Rome; New York City	
Latvia	14:47.71	Jeļena Prokopčuka	1 August 2000	Stockholm	R3
Belarus	14:47.75	Volha Kravtsova	13 August 2005	Helsinki	R3
Djibouti	14:49.00	Samiyah Hassan Nour	19 June 2024	Liège	R3
Sweden	14:49.95	Meraf Bahta	22 May 2016	Rabat	R3
Israel	14:53.43	Selamawit Teferi	30 July 2021	Tokyo	R3
Bulgaria	14:56.95	Daniela Yordanova	25 September 2000	Sydney	R3
Ukraine	14:59.26	Nataliya Berkut	12 June 2004	Moscow	R3
Switzerland	14:59.28	Anita Weyermann	5 June 1996	Rome	R3
Rwanda	14:59.92	Emeline Imanizabayo	29 July 2026	Glasgow	
Kyrgyzstan	15:00.42	Darya Maslova	18 May 2017	Baku	R3
United Arab Emirates	15:00.45	Alia Saeed Mohammed	18 May 2017	Baku	R3
Slovenia	15:01.37	Klara Lukan	10 June 2023	Montesson	R3
Hungary	15:02.00	Katalin Szentgyörgyi	2 June 2002	Hengelo	R3
Moldova	15:02.12	Svetlana Guskova	21 June 1986	Tallinn	R3
Greece	15:04.03	Maria Protopappa	25 August 2006	Brussels	R3
India	15:04.26	Parul Chaudhary	13 June 2026	Nice	
Poland	15:04.88	Lidia Chojecka	6 September 2002	Berlin	R3
Uzbekistan	15:05.50	Svetlana Ulmasova	8 July 1986	Moscow	R4
Algeria	15:07.49	Souad Aït Salem	8 July 2006	Paris-St-Denis	R3
Jamaica	15:07.50	Aisha Praught-Leer	16 May 2019	Los Angeles	R3
Denmark	15:07.70	Anna Emilie Møller	14 July 2019	Gävle	R3
Austria	15:10.54	Susanne Pumper	22 July 2001	London	R3
Serbia	15:11.25	Olivera Jevtić	22 September 2000	Sydney	R3
Namibia	15:14.23	Helalia Johannes	24 October 2019	Wuhan	R3
Albania	15:16.47	Luiza Gega	19 June 2022	Craiova	R3
Brazil	15:22.01	Carmen de Oliveira	31 July 1993	Hechtel	R3
Argentina	15:23.83	Florencia Borelli	3 June 2022	Manchester	R3
Colombia	15:26.18	Muriel Coneo Paredes	10 August 2017	London	R3
Lithuania	15:28.66	Inga Juodeškienė	5 August 2000	Hechtel	R3
Tunisia	15:29.14	Marwa Bouzayani	8 June 2024	Radès	R3
Azerbaijan	15:29.47	Layes Abdullayeva	17 July 2011	Ostrava	R3
Peru	15:30.63	Inés Melchor	28 November 2013	Trujillo	R3
Estonia	15:30.84	Ille Kukk	1 August 1985	Leningrad	R3
Czech Republic	15:31.15	Kristina Mäki	23 June 2016	Sligo	R3
Cuba	15:31.35	Anisleidis Ochoa	18 September 2025	Tokyo	
Georgia	15:32.02	Valeriya Zhandarova	2 August 2022	Cheboksary	R3
South Sudan	15:33.85 (Note: Lohalith has represented the Refugee Olympic Team at the Olympics)	Anjelina Lohalith	8 July 2023	Décines	
South Korea	15:34.17	Kim Do-yeon	13 July 2017	Abashiri	R3
Malawi	15:36.22	Catherine Chikwakwa	13 July 2004	Grosseto	R3
North Korea	15:37.5 h	Ham Bong-sil	30 April 2002	Pyongyang	R3
Ecuador	15:37.55	Andrea Paola Bonilla	4 April 2025	Palo Alto	
Zimbabwe	15:40.43	Samukeliso Moyo	8 March 2000	Adelaide	R3
Palestine	15:40.72	Layla Almasri (Note: eligible to compete for PLE with effect of 14th March 2023)	17 April 2025	Azusa	
Luxembourg	15:42.38	Danièle Kaber	5 September 1986	Brussels	R3
Slovakia	15:43.67	Alena Močáriová	21 June 1988	Grudziądz	R3
Croatia	15:43.73; 15:37.98 i	Bojana Bjeljac	29 May 2019; 18 February 2023	Regensburg; Zagreb	R3
Hong Kong	15:45.87	Maggie Chan Man Yee	3 May 2002	Palo Alto	R3
Vietnam	15:46.11	Nguyễn Thị Oanh	31 May 2025	Gumi	
Puerto Rico	15:46.65	Beverly Ramos	4 April 2014	Palo Alto	R3
Zambia	15:47.58	Mirriam Kaumba	1 May 2005	Palo Alto	R3
Nigeria	15:47.6 h	Aminat Olowora	23 June 2016	Portland	R3
Chile	15:51.45	Érika Olivera	20 May 2000	Rio de Janeiro	R3
Bosnia and Herzegovina	15:53.45	Mirsada Burić	14 April 1995	Walnut	R3
Iceland	15:53.5 hMx; 15:55.91	Martha Ernstdóttir	4 August 1991; 30 July 1994	Essen; Hechtel	R4
Indonesia	15:54.32	Triyaningsih Triyaningsih	8 December 2007	Nakhon Ratchasima	R3
Guatemala	15:54.48	Viviana Aroche	26 May 2023	Andújar	R3
Sri Lanka	15:55.84	Gayanthika Abeyratne	31 October 2021	Colombo	R4
Sudan	16:01.25	Hind Roko Musa	24 June 2004	Algiers	R4
Cyprus	16:09.90	Meropi Panagiotou	27 June 2021	Smederevo	R4
Chinese Taipei	16:10.20	Hsieh Chien-Ho	01 June 2019	Yokohama	R4
Bolivia	16:13.14	Jhoselyn Camargo	30 May 2021	Guayaquil	
Paraguay	16:13.28	Carmen Patricia Martínez	03 August 2014	São Paulo	R4
Chad	16:16.01	Fraida Hassanatte	27 April 2025	Busto Arsizio	
Malaysia	16:18.12	Yuan Yufang	13 October 1997	Jakarta	R4
Trinidad and Tobago	16:19.17; 16:01.69 i	Tonya Nero	16 April 2011; 12 February 2011	Wichita; Ames	
Madagascar	16:20.30	Clarisse Rasoarizay	13 August 1998	Saint-Paul	R4
Dominican Republic	16:22.28	María Mancebo	11 April 2014	Ponce	R4
Botswana	16:24.10	Onneile Dintwe	06 February 2009	Durban	R4
Panama	16:24.75	Rolanda Bell	26 April 2014	Philadelphia	R4
Jordan	16:25.20	Tamara Armoush	01 August 2018	Milton Keynes	R4
Ghana	16:25.28	Sarah Koomson	28 March 2024	Austin	
Malta	16:34.16	Gina McNamara	3 May 2024	New York	
Cameroon	16:31.08	Thérèse Ngono Etoundi	05 October 2009	Beirut	R4
Congo DR	16:32.2 hA	Ritha Tumaïni Nzabava	28 May 2017	Kigali	R4
Nepal	16:36.61	Santoshi Shrestha	24 October 2025	Ranchi	
El Salvador	16:37.88	Elizabeth Guerrini	22 April 2004	Des Moines	R4
Iraq	16:39.3 h	Maysa Matrood	6 May 1994	Baghdad	R4
Bermuda	16:40.31	Ashley Estwanik	15 June 2012	Hamilton	R4
Philippines	16:40.81	Mercedita Manipol	10 December 2003	Hanoi	R4
Iran	16:44.42	Parisa Arab	10 October 2021	Tehran	R4
Uruguay	16:46.65; 16:42.19 (Note: ratified by CAU but not recognised by World Athletics, which lists a time of 17:29.37 as Fernández's personal best.)	Elena Guerra; María Pía Fernández	18 April 2004; 4 November 2018	Montevideo; Montevideo	R4
San Marino	16:50.34	Elisa Vagnini	18 September 1999	Bressanone	
North Macedonia	16:50.89	Adrijana Pop Arsova	19 June 2022	Craiova	
Sierra Leone	16:51.79	Theresa Kargbo	05 June 2024	Accra	
Burkina Faso	16:52.88	Samatou Tindé	5 June 2024	Accra	
Lebanon	16:53.89	Nadia Dagher	25 May 2016	Koblenz	R4
Antigua and Barbuda	16:56.42	Janil Williams	11 August 2000	Victoria	R4
Mali	16:57.54	Awa Arama Kleinmann	07 June 2019	Lunéville	R4
Turkmenistan	16:59.1 h	Anna Markelova	25 April 1998	Ashkhabad	R4
Benin	17:00.05	Kabiratou Nassam Alassani	26 June 2016	Brussels	R4
Egypt	17:04.15	Shahd Mohamed Abdo	14 September 2022	Maadi	
Gabon	17:04.70	Josiane Aboungone	12 July 2000	St-Maur-des-Fossés	R4
Singapore	17:06.69	Vanessa Lee Ying Zhuang	6 March 2025	Box Hill	
Timor-Leste	17:08.87	Agueda Fátima Amaral	24 October 1989	Jakarta	R4
Thailand	17:09.59	Patcharee Chaitangsri	10 December 2003	Hanoi	R4
Togo	17:10.11	Ablavi Adoki Atchadé	15 May 2011	Lomé	R4
Guam	17:13.33	Debbie Cardenas	29 March 2002	Stanford	R4
Congo Republic	17:14.27	Jodelle Ossou Wakeyi	20 May 2012	Brazzaville	R4
Armenia	17:18.12	Nune Avagian	15 September 1990	Kyiv	R4
Libya	17:23.87	Najla Aqdeir Ali Salem	24 September 2017	Modena	R4
Bhutan	17:24.21 A	Goma Pradhan	06 December 2019	Kathmandu	R4
São Tomé and Príncipe	17:25.99	Celma Bonfim Soares	19 August 2008	Beijing	R4
Eswatini	17:30.04	Priscilla Mamba	22 September 2000	Sydney	R4
Northern Mariana Islands	17:31.19	Nathania Tan	10 May 2025	Portland	
U.S. Virgin Islands	17:31.37	Jackie Morgan	10 July 1999	Tampa	R4
Honduras	17:34.53	Yessica Carolina Espinal	6 May 2023	San José	
Costa Rica	17:35.08	Priscila Maria Solis	23 June 2024	San José	
Laos	17:36.05	Inthakoumman Lodkeo	8 May 2023	Phnom Penh	
Senegal	17:38.47	Adama Barry Bâ	19 July 2019	Dakar	R4
Solomon Islands	18:01.62	Sharon Firisua	16 August 2016	Rio de Janeiro	
Gibraltar	18:03.98	Kim Baglietto	3 July 2015	Saint Clement	
Bahamas	18:05.25	Hughnique Rolle	27 April 2012	Bethlehem	R4
Saint Lucia	18:13.22	Nessa Paul	29 May 2004	Louisville	R4
Macau	18:28.60	Hoi Long	4 October 2015	Taipei	
Turks and Caicos	18:49.35	Rebecca Bernadin	25 March 2022	Starkville	R4
Pakistan	19:03.10 (Note: Recognised by World Athletics but not ratified by the Athletics Federation of Pakistan); 19:04.0 h	Myra Nur Lakdawala; Rabia Ashiq	25 February 2017; 20 May 2012	San Francisco; Islamabad	R4
Belize	19:40.28	Melissa Henderson	3 June 2005	San José	R4
Maldives	19:41.86	Shamha Ahmed	4 May 2024	Wassenberg	
Samoa	19:42.0 h	Mele Steiner	15 February 1983	Auckland	R4
Kuwait	20:01.6 h	Tayba Nader Mohamed Al-Nouri	14 November 2020	Kuwait City	
Saudi Arabia	20:33.42	Miznah Al-Nasser	18 May 2022	Kuwait City	
Bangladesh	21:17.60	Sumi Akter	9 February 2016	Guwaharati	
Afghanistan	21:33.59	Shabnam Fayyaz	26 April 2019	Terre Haute	R4
