= AK Borac =

- Based in: Banja Luka
- Home ground: Banja Luka City Stadium
- Colors
- President: Dušan Mišljenović
- Head coach: Nebojša Matijević

AK Borac or Atletski klub Borac Banjaluka (Serbian Cyrillic: АК Бopaц Бања Лука) is an athletics club from Banja Luka, Republika Srpska, Bosnia and Herzegovina. It competes in both the men's and women's national leagues under Atletski Savez Bosne I Hercegovine.

== Notable athletes ==
- (Bosnia and Herzegovina) Dušan Babić
- (Bosnia and Herzegovina) Lucia Kimani
- (Bosnia and Herzegovina) Nataša Petrović
- (Bosnia and Herzegovina) Milan Radulović
- (Bosnia and Herzegovina) Željko Petrović
