= Bosnia and Herzegovina at the 2023 World Athletics Championships =

- Flag of Bosnia and Herzegovina
- WA code: BIH
- National federation: Athletic Federation of Bosnia and Herzegovina
- Website: asbih.org

in Budapest, Hungary 19 August 2023 – 27 August 2023
- Competitors: 3 (3 men)
- Medals: Gold 0 Silver 0 Bronze 0 Total 0

World Athletics Championships appearances (overview)
- 1993; 1995; 1997; 1999; 2001; 2003; 2005; 2007; 2009; 2011; 2013; 2015; 2017; 2019; 2022; 2023

Other related appearances
- Yugoslavia (1983–1991)

Bosnia and Herzegovina competed at the 2023 World Athletics Championships in Budapest, Hungary, from 19 to 27 August 2023.

== Results ==
Bosnia and Herzegovina entered 3 athletes.

Key

- Q = Qualified for the next round
- q = Qualified for the next round as a fastest loser or, in field events, by position without achieving the qualifying target
- NR = National record
- PB = Personal best
- SB = Season best
- N/A = Round not applicable for the event

=== Men ===
Track and road events

Athlete	Event	Heat		Semi-final		Final	
Athlete	Event	Result	Rank	Result	Rank	Result	Rank
Abedin Mujezinović	800 metres	1:47.76	38	Did not advance			
Amel Tuka	800 metres	1:49.01	51	Did not advance			

Field events

Athlete	Event	Qualification		Final	
Athlete	Event	Distance	Position	Distance	Position
Mesud Pezer	Shot put	19.86	22	Did not advance	
