= Bosnia and Herzegovina at the 2019 World Athletics Championships =

Bosnia and Herzegovina at the 2019 World Championships in Athletics
- Flag of Bosnia and Herzegovina
- WA code: BIH
- National federation: Athletic Federation of Bosnia and Herzegovina
- Website: asbih.org

in Doha, Qatar 27 September — 6 October 2019
- Competitors: 3 (3 men) in 2 events
- Medals Ranked 27th: Gold 0 Silver 1 Bronze 0 Total 1

World Championships in Athletics appearances (overview)
- 1993; 1995; 1997; 1999; 2001; 2003; 2005; 2007; 2009; 2011; 2013; 2015; 2017; 2019; 2022; 2023

Other related appearances
- Yugoslavia (1983–1991)

Bosnia and Herzegovina competed at the 2019 World Championships in Athletics in Doha, Qatar, from 27 September to 6 October 2019. Bosnia and Herzegovina were represented by 3 athletes.

== Medalists ==
Medal	Athlete	Event	Date
Silver	Amel Tuka	Men's 800 metres	1 October

== Results ==
=== Men ===
Track and road events

Athlete	Event	Heat		Semifinal		Final	
Athlete	Event	Result	Rank	Result	Rank	Result	Rank
Amel Tuka	800 metres	01:45.62	6 Q	1:45.63	11 Q	1:43.47 SB	2nd place, silver medalist(s)

Field events

Athlete	Event	Qualification		Final	
Athlete	Event	Distance	Position	Distance	Position
Kemal Mešić	Shot put	19.49	33	Did not advance	
Mesud Pezer	Shot put	20.17	20	Did not advance	
