= 1989 Berlin Marathon =

16th Berlin Marathon
- Venue: Berlin, West Germany
- Date: 1 October

Champions
- Men: Alfredo Shahanga (2:08:16)
- Women: Päivi Tikkanen (2:28:45)
- Wheelchair men: Heinz Frei (1:40:11)
- Wheelchair women: Daniela Jutzeler (1:55:23)

The 1989 Berlin Marathon was the 16th running of the annual marathon race held in Berlin, West Germany, held on 1 October. Australia's Alfredo Shahanga won the men's race in 2:10:11 hours, while the women's race was won by Finland's Päivi Tikkanen in 2:28:45. Heinz Frei (1:40:11) and Daniela Jutzeler (1:55:23), both of Switzerland, won the men's and women's wheelchair races. A total of 13,433 runners finished the race, 12,233 men and 1200 women.

== Results ==
=== Men ===
Rank	Athlete	Nationality	Time
1st place, gold medalist(s)	Alfredo Shahanga	Tanzania	2:10:11
2nd place, silver medalist(s)	Dereje Nedi	Ethiopia	2:11:15
3rd place, bronze medalist(s)	Spyros Andriopoulos	Greece	2:12:59
4	Nikolay Tabak	Soviet Union	2:13:03
5	Sergey Rozum	Russia	2:13:03
6	Jan Huruk	Poland	2:13:12
7	Karol Dolega	Poland	2:13:18
8	Osmiro Silva	Brazil	2:13:39
9	Igor Braslavskiy	Soviet Union	2:13:58
10	Daniel Böltz	Switzerland	2:14:11
11	Kazimierz Lasecki	Poland	2:16:09
12	Dick Tesselaar	Netherlands	2:16:14
13	Justin Gloden	Luxembourg	2:16:19
14	Dariusz Kaczmarski	Poland	2:16:24
15	Wiesław Pałczyński	Poland	2:16:31
16	Wojciech Więckowski	Poland	2:16:37
17	Pawel Małkowski	Poland	2:16:39
18	Hans Nilsson	Sweden	2:16:42
19	Jan Ikov	Denmark	2:17:05
20	Peter Gschwend	Switzerland	2:17:14

=== Women ===
Rank	Athlete	Nationality	Time
1st place, gold medalist(s)	Päivi Tikkanen	Finland	2:28:45
2nd place, silver medalist(s)	Renata Kokowska	Poland	2:32:04
3rd place, bronze medalist(s)	Kerstin Preßler	West Germany	2:33:35
4	Sissel Grottenberg	Norway	2:33:55
5	Rita Borralho	Portugal	2:34:11
6	Dimitra Papaspirou	Greece	2:34:24
7	Krystyna Chylińska	Poland	2:35:52
8	Angelika Dunke	West Germany	2:36:13
9	Ágnes Sipka	Hungary	2:36:58
10	Irina Sklyarenko	Soviet Union	2:36:59
11	Petra Liebertz	West Germany	2:37:13
12	Tatyana Fyodorova	Soviet Union	2:37:40
13	Bożena Dziubińska	Poland	2:38:26
14	Gabriela Gorzynska	Poland	2:38:34
15	Anna-Isabel Holtkamp	West Germany	2:38:39
16	Czeslawa Mentlewicz	Poland	2:38:42
17	Beate Waeber	West Germany	2:38:55
18	Heather MacDuff	United Kingdom	2:39:59
19	Janina Saxer-Juszko	Switzerland	2:40:16
20	Dorota Dankiewicz	Poland	2:41:09
