= Alfredo Shahanga =

Tanzanian long-distance runner

Alfredo Shahanga (born 14 April 1965) is a retired long-distance runner from Tanzania, who won the 1989 edition of the Vienna Marathon. In the same year he triumphed at the 16th Berlin Marathon on 1 October in a time of 2:10:11. Shahanga represented his native country in the men's marathon at the 1991 World Championships in Tokyo, Japan.

Shahanga was an All-American runner for the UTEP Miners track and field team, finishing 3rd in the 10,000 metres at the 1986 NCAA Division I Outdoor Track and Field Championships. He left the school after the 1986 season because it was on NCAA probation.

Alfredo is the brother of fellow UTEP Miners runner Gidamis Shahanga. He said of his brother, "I have always lived in his shadow".

== Achievements ==
- All results regarding marathon, unless stated otherwise

Year	Competition	Venue	Position	Notes
Representing Tanzania
1987	Houston Marathon	Houston, Texas	4th	2:12:27
1987	Vienna Marathon	Vienna, Austria	2nd	2:16:36
1988	Paris Marathon	Paris, France	7th	2:17:50
1989	Vienna Marathon	Vienna, Austria	1st	2:10:28
1989	Berlin Marathon	Berlin, West Germany	1st	2:10:11
1990	Hamburg Marathon	Hamburg, Germany	4th	2:13:17
1990	Berlin Marathon	Berlin, Germany	10th	2:13:29
1990	Palermo Marathon	Palermo, Italy	3rd	2:13:43
1991	London Marathon	London, England	6th	2:11:20
1991	World Championships	Tokyo, Japan	—	DNF
1991	Venice Marathon	Venice, Italy	3rd	2:17:52
1993	Berlin Marathon	Berlin, Germany	4th	2:12:24
