= Dušan Babić =

Bosnian middle-distance runner

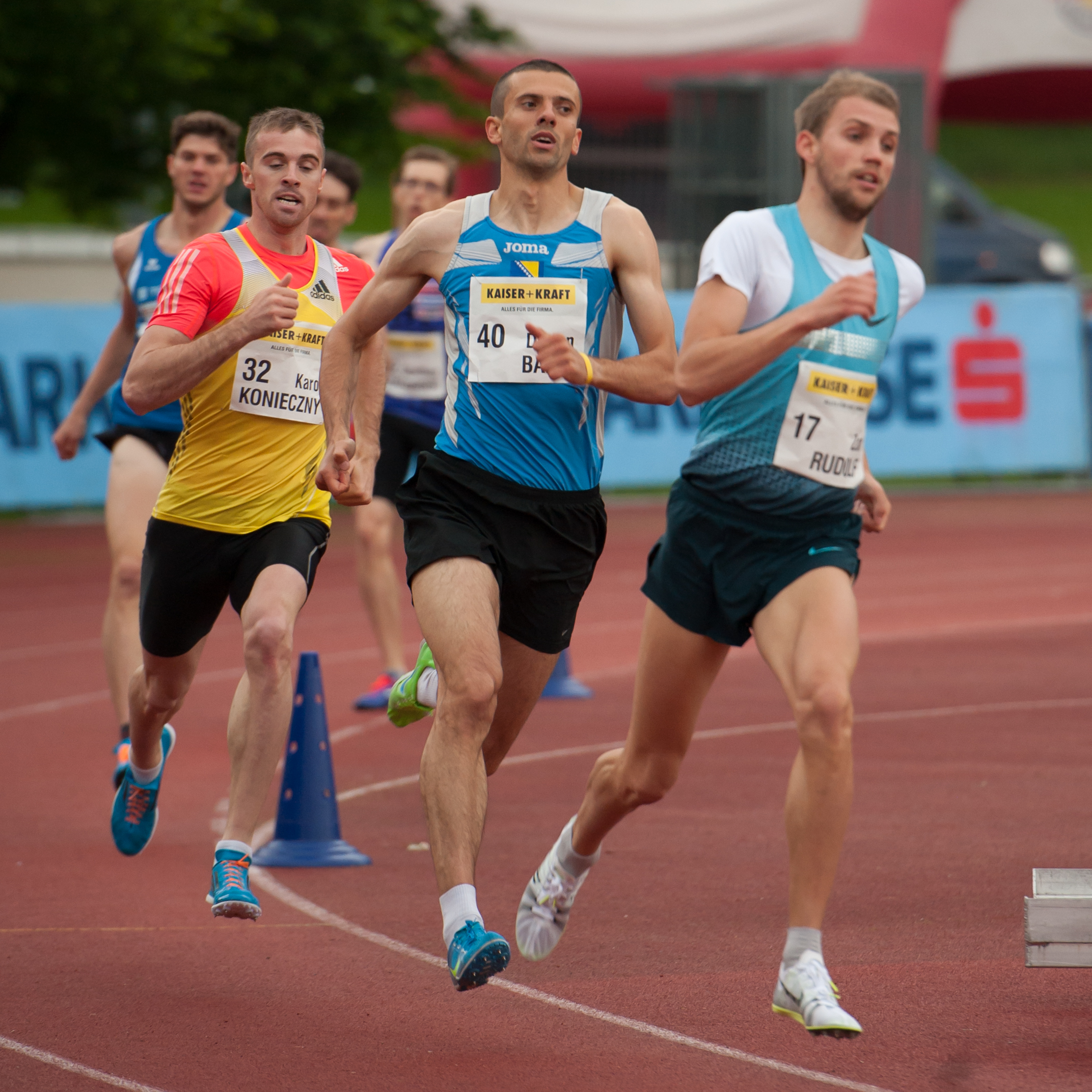
- Babić (wearing bib #40) in 2015

Personal information
- Nationality: Bosnian
- Born: December 26, 1986 (age 39) Banja Luka, SR Bosnia and Herzegovina, SFR Yugoslavia

Sport
- Sport: Track, cross country
- Event(s): 800 meters, 1500 meters
- Club: AK Borac

Achievements and titles
- Personal best(s): 800m: 1:48.45; 1500m: 3:44.10
- Updated on June 21, 2015

Dušan Babić (born 26 December 1986) is a Bosnian middle-distance runner. He initially specialized in the 800 meters before making a gradual transition to the 1500 meters from 2014. During the course of his career, he represented Bosnia and Herzegovina as an 800-meter runner at two Summer Universiades in 2009 and 2011. He also appeared at the 2013 Mediterranean Games.

== Running career ==
Babić's 2011 outdoor season started with a second-place finish at the 2011 European Third League men's 800-meter race. Subsequently, he made an appearance at the 2011 Summer Universiade in the men's 800 meters, but did not advance past the preliminary round. At the 2013 Mediterranean Games, he finished second to last in the men's 800 meters, although he finished ahead of Giordano Benedetti.

In 2015 he made a full transition to the 1500 meters discipline. On February 1, 2015, he made his indoor track debut at the 2015 ELÁN meet in Bratislava, where he won the indoor men's 1500 meters. Off the track, he also saw success in cross country, when he finished first overall in Bosnia and Herzegovina's national cross country competition held in Brčko on March 14, 2015. On May 1, 2015, Babić also finished in first place in the men's 1500 meters at the 21st International Meeting in Bar, Montenegro.
