= Vinko Pokrajčić =

Bosnian retired middle-distance runner (born 1958)

Personal information
- Nationality: Yugoslav; Croatian
- Born: July 14, 1958 Mrkodol, Tomislavgrad, Yugoslavia

Sport
- Sport: Track
- Event(s): 1500 meters, mile
- Club: AK Sarajevo
- Coached by: Lazar Ćirović

Achievements and titles
- Highest world ranking: 5th junior (1977)
- Personal best(s): 1500m: 3:39.83; Mile: 3:58.41
Medal record
Representing Yugoslavia
Men's athletics
Universiade
Silver medal – second place	1981 Bucharest	1500 m

Vinko Pokrajčić (born 14 July 1958) is a Bosnian retired middle-distance runner who competed internationally for Yugoslavia. He was the runner-up in the men's 1500 meters at the 1981 Summer Universiade.

== Early life ==
Pokrajčić was one of seven children in his family. He dropped out of school in eighth grade, intending to move to Germany as a guest worker. However, after a time trial with coach Leo Lang, his family introduced him to coach Lazar Ćirović of AK Sarajevo. Pokrajčić's first race was Yugoslavia's state 3000 meters for the "young juniors" age group. Before the race, Ćirović told him, "son, you run with them as long as you can, when you can't, just stop." With only 300 meters to go, Ćirović told him "go now if you can", and Pokrajčić won the race. He subsequently joined AK Sarajevo, and lived in Sarajevo until the Bosnian War began.

== Running career ==
In 1977, he was called up to Yugoslavia's national junior cross country team for a race in Shumen, Bulgaria. He won the race even though someone stepped on one of his racing spikes early in the race, causing him to run the rest of the race missing one shoe. Two years later, he ran the men's 1500 meters at the 1979 European Indoor Championships, finishing second to last in his heat in a time of 3:48.2.

At the 1981 Summer Universiade, he ran a personal best of 3:39.83 in the men's 1500 meters, finishing second overall behind Saïd Aouita. He was only the third person from Yugoslavia to have ever run under 3:40 in the 1500 meters, after Boško Božinović and Dragan Zdravković.
