= Xolile Yawa =

South African long-distance runner

Medal record

Men's athletics

Representing South Africa

African Championships
Bronze medal – third place	1992 Belle Vue Harel	10,000

Xolile Yawa (born 29 September 1962 in Lady Frere, Eastern Cape) is a retired athlete from South Africa - ZA. He specialised in long-distance running, including marathons.

He is best known as the winner of 1993 Berlin Marathon. At the 1992 Summer Olympics, he was 13th at men's 10,000 metres. He also represented South Africa at the 1996 Summer Olympics. At the 1992 African Championships in Athletics, he won Bronze at 10000 metres.

At the South African national championships, he won the 10,000 metres track event nine times (1985–1990, 1992, 1994, 1996) and Half marathon twice (1986 and 1988).

== Achievements ==
Year	Competition	Venue	Position	Event	Notes
Representing South Africa
1992	World Half Marathon Championships	Newcastle, United Kingdom	11th	Half marathon	1:01:48
1993	Boston Marathon	Boston, United States	14th	Marathon	2:15:28
1993	Berlin Marathon	Berlin, Germany	1st	Marathon	2:10:57
1994	Seoul Marathon	Seoul, South Korea	7th	Marathon	2:11:54
1994	Berlin Marathon	Berlin, Germany	21st	Marathon	2:17:05
1995	London Marathon	London, United Kingdom	4th	Marathon	2:10:22
1995	Berlin Marathon	Berlin, Germany	6th	Marathon	2:11:56
1997	Tokyo Marathon	Tokyo, Japan	7th	Marathon	2:13:38
1997	World Championships	Athens, Greece	12th	Marathon	2:18:37
1999	Reims à Toutes Jambes	Reims, France	8th	Marathon	2:14:03
2000	Houston Marathon	Houston, United States	6th	Marathon	2:16:24
