= Igor Braslavskiy =

Soviet and Ukrainian athlete

Igor Braslavskiy (born 19 August 1959) is a Moldovan middle-distance and long-distance runner. He achieved fame in 1983, when he ran the 5,000 meters in Chișinău, then part of the Soviet Union (USSR), and clocked a 13:47.6, setting a new national record in Moldova for the distance. He continued to prominence as a runner in the USSR in 1986, when he became the National Marathon Champion for the nation on July 6 in Moscow.

Braslavskiy has also been a winner or top finisher in major marathons, including his 24th-place finish in the London Marathon, his ninth-place finish in the Berlin Marathon, his second place at the 1993 Istanbul Marathon in Turkey, and his fourth place at the 1994 Stockholm Marathon.

He earned greater recognition in the United States in the early 1990s. At the 1990 Grandma's Marathon in the Minnesota, which starts in Two Harbors, Minnesota, and heads southeast along the shore of Lake Superior to Duluth, he pulled away to win first place. He traveled back to the States in 1992, earning a second-place finish on the Chicago Marathon's flat course near the shore of Lake Michigan.
