= Lucia Kimani =

Kenyan-born Bosnian long-distance runner (born 1981)

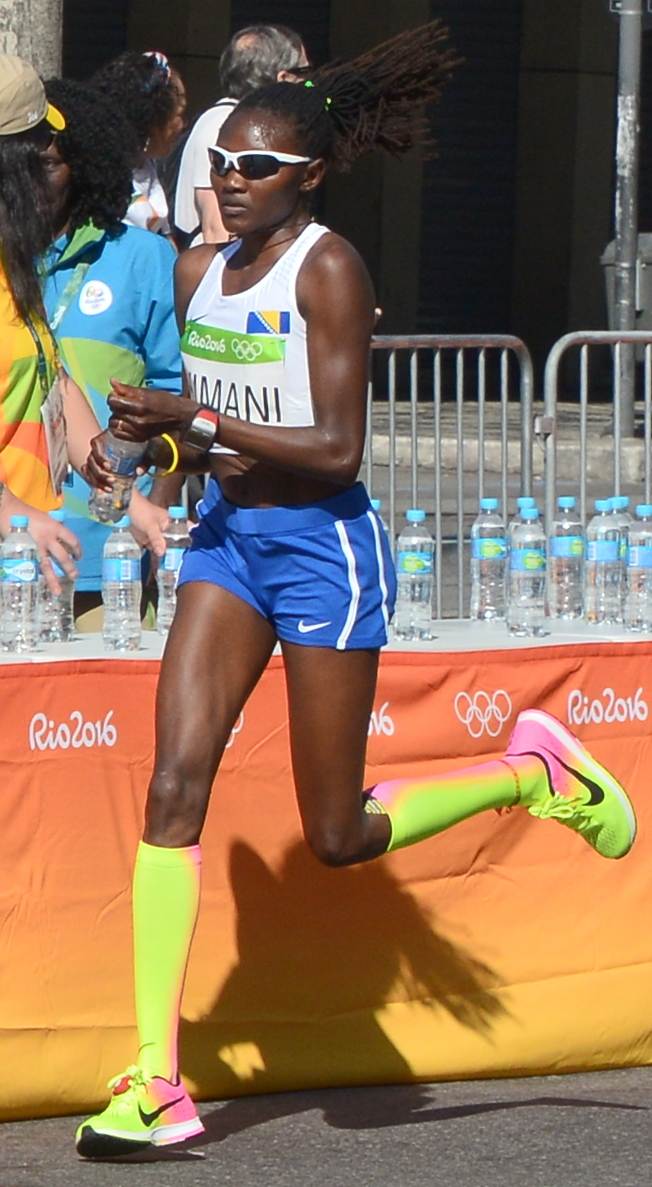
- Kimani at the 2016 Olympics

Personal information
- Nationality: Bosnian
- Born: 21 June 1981 (age 45) Kajiado, Kenya
- Height: 1.66 m (5 ft 5 1/2 in)
- Weight: 45 kg (99 lb)

Sport
- Country: Bosnia and Herzegovina
- Sport: Track
- Events: 5000 meters, half marathon, marathon
- Club: AK Borac
- Coached by: Siniša Marčetić

Achievements and titles
- Personal bests: 5000 m – 34:03.23 (2008); HM – 1:12:55 (2007); Marathon – 2:34:57 (2011)
- Updated on 21 July 2012

Lucia Kimani Mwahiki-Marčetić (born 21 June 1981) is a Kenyan-born Bosnian long-distance runner who holds four Bosnian records over different distances.

In 2004, she married her Bosnian husband Siniša Marčetić. They met earlier that year in Salzburg, Austria, where they ran a half-marathon race. On 19 August 2005, they moved to Bosnia and Herzegovina and currently live in Banja Luka. Her husband is from Prijedor. In 2006 Lucia received Bosnian citizenship.

Lucia was part of the Bosnian Olympic team at the 2008 Summer Olympics. She withdrew from the 2012 marathon race due to a back injury, but competed at the 2016 Rio Olympics. On 23 December 2008, she was voted the best Bosnian female athlete of 2008. She won the Skopje Marathon in 2010 and the Cracovia Marathon in 2012. In 2013, together with her husband she opened a running school in Prijedor.

== Achievements ==
Year	Competition	Venue	Position	Event	Notes
2008	Olympic Games	Beijing, China	42nd	Marathon	2:35:47
2012	Olympic Games	London, United Kingdom	DNF	Marathon	DNF
2016	Olympic Games	Rio de Janeiro, Brazil	116th	Marathon	2:58:22
