= Mirsada Burić =

Bosnian long-distance runner (born 1970)

Personal information
- Nationality: Bosnian
- Born: 8 April 1970 (age 56) Mihaljevići, Yugoslavia

Sport
- Sport: Long-distance running
- Event: 3000 metres

Mirsada Burić (born 8 April 1970) is a Bosnian former long-distance runner. She was a top runner in the former Yugoslavia, being the Balkan Games champion in the 3000 metres. In 1992, the Bosnian War started, and Burić was sent to a concentration camp, later being released in a prisoner exchange. She subsequently received widespread attention for her attempts to train for the Olympic Games amidst the war, running through the streets of Sarajevo despite nearly being killed on several occasions. She ended up competing in the women's 3000 metres at the 1992 Summer Olympics, placing 31st, and later moved to the U.S., where she competed for the teams of Yavapai College and Adams State College.

== Early life ==
Burić was born on 8 April 1970 in Mihaljevići, Yugoslavia. A Bosnian Muslim, she grew up the village of Bojni near Sarajevo. She became a top runner from a young age, winning the Sarajevo cross country title in her age group for 10 straight years. She began representing the Yugoslavia national team in 1985 and won two events at the Balkan Games, gaining the Balkan championship in the 3000 metres. She graduated from the University of Sarajevo in journalism.

== Bosnian War ==
In April 1992, the Bosnian War started. Fought between Bosniaks and Bosnian Serbs, Burić's hometown came under attack. She recalled that "the attack came from all directions, and I found myself lying on a concrete floor in the basement with 40 other women and children." After the group attempted escape, they were captured by Serb soldiers; Burić, 13 family members and some of her neighbors were taken to a concentration camp, while others, including her brother, disappeared or were killed.

Some prisoners at the camp were beaten and Burić was kicked in the face. They received only a cup of tea and a piece of bread per day. After about two weeks, she and 350 other Muslim women and children were released in a prisoner exchange. She later learned that her former best friend and running partner, a Serb, had been assigned to kill her in the camp, with Burić being released just before she was to be killed. She was allowed to return to her home in Bojnik to collect trophies, finding her house "shot up", with a soldier there attempting to rape her. According to the Los Angeles Times, "she told him he'd have to kill her first. He relented, probably fearing the repercussions of killing a well-known runner."

Burić was not able to stay in her village, which was ethnically cleansed of Bosniaks. She moved to Sarajevo and began training, in hopes of participating at the 1992 Summer Olympics, which was to take place in less than a month. She survived on limited food, having access only to rice and pasta. Her equipment had also been stolen, so she trained in the streets of Sarajevo with borrowed shoes. The News Tribune described how she "would run the streets of Sarajevo, veering from rubble, dodging shards of glass, sensing that in her quest to be her very best, every stride could be her last." She had to plan her training to avoid being killed. She ran based on whether air raid sirens were going off and altered her routes to avoid snipers. When the city was being shelled, she ran in an underground parking lot or on the staircases in buildings. Twice she was shot at during her training, and so she tried to stay close to buildings when running, so that "it would be easier to take cover in a stairwell in case she heard gunshots." She recalled that "Sniper man everywhere. They shoot everything moving, but I keep running. I'm a little scared, but I don't care. I keep running. When you spend 13 days in concentration camp and Serbs can kill you any minute, any second, and you know how easy you lose your life, you don't care what happen to you. [sic]"

The News Tribune noted that "Burić's dedication gradually grew into the rallying cry for a baby nation. She symbolized the courage of a courageous people." People in Sarajevo noticed her and she acquired fans who cheered her on during her runs from behind basement windows. Eventually, she was able to receive meals at a Holiday Inn hotel, provided by the Bosnian Olympic committee. However, she said that "The hotel was under constant sniper fire and shelling, so I risked my life every day walking there from my temporary residence in Kosevsko Brdo in order to feed myself." The Bosnian television show Nadrealisti gave her the nickname "Madam Sniper", as she "defied the gunmen who took aim at her."

== 1992 Olympics ==
Burić was one of 10 Bosnians selected to compete at the 1992 Olympics, but the athletes were almost unable to make it to the games. As the games were approaching, she was pessimistic about her chances of being able to compete. However, shortly before they were to begin, she and the others were escorted by the United Nations Protection Force to an airport, where a special plane chartered by the International Olympic Committee waited. After arriving at the airport, the plane was stuck as grenades were exploding nearby the runway. After a six-hour delay, the plane took off and arrived in Barcelona, Spain, three hours before the opening Olympic ceremony.

At the Olympics, Burić competed in the 3000 metres, where she placed last in her heat and finished 31st out of 33. However, her participation was described as "no defeat", and she received an ovation from fans as she finished. Her story was widely covered and the Los Angeles Times called her "a celebrity" in the Olympic village: "Journalists from around the world tracked her down for interviews and pictures."

== After the Olympics ==
After the Olympics, Burić lived as a refugee in Slovenia, while her family remained in Bosnia. Amid the news coverage of Burić, Eric Adam, an audio specialist from the U.S., noticed, later recalling that "I was impressed. I knew instantly that I'd meet her some day." He was able to contact the Bosnian Olympic team and received Burić's address, sending her a letter that "someone in America admires you very much." Burić had a friend write a letter back, signed "Love, Mirsada", and Burić and Adam then exchanged letters in the subsequent months. In January 1993, Adam flew to Croatia to meet her, and two months later, he arranged for her to get a visa, allowing her to move to the U.S., into Adam's Arizona apartment. The two later married in December 1993. At the same time, they worked to get wounded children out of Bosnia, with Adam spending $15,000 and "untold hours" for the cause.

After moving to the U.S., Burić was offered an athletic scholarship by Yavapai College. She competed as a runner there, placing fourth in the 5,000 metres at the national community college championships in her first year. Then, in 1994, she helped the school's cross country team win the national title and won a title herself in the 5,000m. At Yavapai, she was a two-time all-conference, two-time all-region and two-time All-American (Note: Honors for the best athletes in the conference, in the region, and in the country, respectively.) selection. She then transferred to Adams State College in Colorado on a track scholarship in 1995, where she won four NCAA Division II championships and set the indoor records for the 1500 metres and 5000 metres. She participated at the 1995 World Championships in Athletics, but afterwards focused more on her education than competitions. She competed at some charity runs in subsequent years, being the first woman to finish at the 1997 and 1998 editions of the Race for the Cure. She also participated in the torch relay for the 1996 Summer Olympics.

After finishing her education, Burić became a journalist. She received a master's degree in journalism from Columbia University and worked for the Prescott Daily Courier, where she received several awards in a seven-year stint with the paper. She later worked as a financial services advisor for BBVA Compass. She had two children with Adam and was inducted into the Yavapai College Athletics Hall of Fame in 2015.
