= Athletic Federation of Bosnia and Herzegovina =

Sports national governing body

- Atletski savez Bosne i Hercegovine
- Sport: Athletics
- Abbreviation: ASBiH
- Founded: 1946
- Affiliation: World Athletics
- Regional affiliation: EAA
- Headquarters: Sarajevo, Bosnia and Herzegovina
- President: Suad Kaknjo
- Vice president: Đurđica Rajhel-Šišul
- Secretary: Milan Pedalo
- Coach: Elvir Krehmić

Official website
- asbih.org
- (Bosnia and Herzegovina)

The Athletic Federation of Bosnia and Herzegovina (Serbo-Croatian: Atletski savez Bosne i Hercegovine, ASBiH) is the governing body for the sport of athletics in Bosnia and Herzegovina. It is a member federation of the Olympic Committee of Bosnia and Herzegovina.

== Affiliations ==
- World Athletics
- European Athletic Association (EAA)
- Olympic Committee of Bosnia and Herzegovina

== National records ==
ASBiH maintains the Bosnian records in athletics.
