= Bosnia and Herzegovina at the Olympics =

- IOC code: BIH
- NOC: Olympic Committee of Bosnia and Herzegovina
- Website: www.okbih.ba (in Bosnian, Serbian, and Croatian)
- Medals: Gold 0 Silver 0 Bronze 0 Total 0

Summer appearances
- 1992; 1996; 2000; 2004; 2008; 2012; 2016; 2020; 2024; 2028

Winter appearances
- 1994; 1998; 2002; 2006; 2010; 2014; 2018; 2022; 2026

Other related appearances
- Yugoslavia (1920–1992 W)

Bosnia and Herzegovina sent athletes to the Summer Olympic Games under its own flag for the first time in 1992. Bosnian athletes competed under the Yugoslav flag (see Yugoslavia at the Olympics) until the breakup of that country. Along with Andorra, Malta, and Monaco, Bosnia and Herzegovina is one of four current European participants that have never won an Olympic medal. As of the 2024 games, its best finish is 5th by taekwondo practitioner Nedžad Husić at the men's 68 kg event at the 2020 Summer Olympics.

The Olympic Committee of Bosnia and Herzegovina was formed in 1992 and recognized in 1993.

== Medal tables ==
=== Medals by Summer Games ===
Games	Athletes	Gold	Silver	Bronze	Total	Rank
1912 Stockholm	as part of Austria					
1920–1988	as part of Yugoslavia					
1992 Barcelona	10	0	0	0	0	–
1996 Atlanta	9	0	0	0	0	–
2000 Sydney	9	0	0	0	0	–
2004 Athens	9	0	0	0	0	–
2008 Beijing	5	0	0	0	0	–
2012 London	6	0	0	0	0	–
2016 Rio de Janeiro	11	0	0	0	0	–
2020 Tokyo	7	0	0	0	0	–
2024 Paris	5	0	0	0	0	–
2028 Los Angeles	future event					
2032 Brisbane	future event					
Total		0	0	0	0	–

=== Medals by Winter Games ===
Games	Athletes	Gold	Silver	Bronze	Total	Rank
1924–1992	as part of Yugoslavia					
1994 Lillehammer	10	0	0	0	0	–
1998 Nagano	8	0	0	0	0	–
2002 Salt Lake City	2	0	0	0	0	–
2006 Turin	6	0	0	0	0	–
2010 Vancouver	5	0	0	0	0	–
2014 Sochi	5	0	0	0	0	–
2018 Pyeongchang	4	0	0	0	0	–
2022 Beijing	6	0	0	0	0	–
2026 Milano Cortina	5	0	0	0	0	–
2030 French Alps	future event					
2034 Utah	future event					
Total		0	0	0	0	–

=== Best Placement by summer sport ===
Bosnia and Herzegovina has yet to win its first medal at Summer Games. Below are the top three placements so far.

Athlete	Year	Sport	Event	Rank
Nedžad Husić	2020	Taekwondo	Men's −68 kg	5
Nedžad Fazlija	2000	Shooting	Men's 10 m air rifle	6
Amel Tuka	2020	Athletics	Men's 800 m	6

=== Best Placement by winter sport ===
Bosnia and Herzegovina has yet to win its first medal at Winter Games. Below are the top three placements so far.

Athlete	Year	Sport	Event	Rank
Enis Bećirbegović	1998	Alpine skiing	Men's downhill	21
Enis Bećirbegović	1998	Alpine skiing	Men's super-G	22
Verona Marjanović	1994	Luge	Women’s singles	23
Ismar Biogradlić	1998	Luge	Men’s singles	23

== Competitors by sport ==
The following is a list of the total number of competitors by sport in the Games.

=== Summer ===
Sport	Men	Women	Total
Athletics	16	8	24
Canoeing	3	0	3
Judo	5	5	10
Shooting	6	3	9
Swimming	10	6	16
Table Tennis	2	0	2
Taekwondo	2	0	2
Tennis	2	1	3
Weightlifting	1	0	1
Wrestling	1	0	1
Total	48	23	71

=== Winter ===
Sport	Men	Women	Total
Alpine skiing	10	9	19
Biathlon	1	3	4
Bobsleigh	10	0	10
Cross-country skiing	6	5	11
Luge	3	1	4
Total	30	18	48

== Flagbearers ==
Summer Olympics
Games	Athlete	Sport
1992 Barcelona	Zlatan Saračević	Athletics
1996 Atlanta	Islam Đugum	Athletics
2000 Sydney	Elvir Krehmić	Athletics
2004 Athens	Nedžad Fazlija	Sports shooting
2008 Beijing	Amel Mekić	Judo
2012 London	Amel Mekić	Judo
2016 Rio de Janeiro	Amel Tuka	Athletics
2020 Tokyo	Amel Tuka	Athletics
2020 Tokyo	Larisa Cerić	Judo
2024 Paris	Mesud Pezer	Athletics
2024 Paris	Larisa Cerić	Judo

Winter Olympics
Games	Athlete	Sport
1994 Lillehammer	Bekim Babić	Cross-country skiing
1998 Nagano	Mario Franjić	Bobsleigh
2002 Salt Lake City	Enis Bećirbegović	Alpine skiing
2006 Turin	Aleksandra Vasiljević	Biathlon
2010 Vancouver	Žana Novaković	Alpine skiing
2014 Sochi	Žana Novaković	Alpine skiing
2018 Pyeongchang	Elvedina Muzaferija	Alpine skiing
2022 Beijing	Elvedina Muzaferija	Alpine skiing
2022 Beijing	Mirza Nikolajev	Luge
2026 Milano Cortina	Elvedina Muzaferija	Alpine skiing
2026 Milano Cortina	Marko Šljivić	Alpine skiing

== Pre-1992 Yugoslavian medalists from Bosnia-Herzegovina ==
Bosnian-Herzegovinian athletes have won medals on many occasions in different sports as part of teams and one as individual competitors (boxing) representing Yugoslavia.

=== Association Football ===
Medal	Games	Team	Names
Silver	(United Kingdom) 1948 London	Men	Miroslav Brozović
Silver	(Australia) 1956 Melbourne	Men	Ibrahim Biogradlić and Muhamed Mujić
Gold	(Italy) 1960 Rome	Men	Tomislav Knez and Velimir Sombolac
Bronze	(United States) 1984 Los Angeles	Men	Mehmed Baždarević, Mirsad Baljić, Vlado Čapljić, Admir Smajić

=== Basketball ===
Medal	Games	Team	Names
Gold	(Soviet Union) 1980 Moscow	Men	Mirza Delibašić, Dražen Dalipagić, Ratko Radovanović
Bronze	(Soviet Union) 1980 Moscow	Women	Mersada Bećirspahić, Vera Đurašković
Bronze	(United States) 1984 Los Angeles	Men	Dražen Dalipagić, Emir Mutapčić, Ratko Radovanović, Sabit Hadžić
Silver	(South Korea) 1988 Seoul	Women	Razija Mujanović, Mara Lakić, Slađana Golić, Vesna Bajkuša

=== Boxing ===
Medal	Games	Team	Names
Gold	(United States) 1984 Los Angeles	Men	Anton Josipović

=== Handball ===
Medal	Games	Team	Names
Gold	(West Germany) 1972 Munich	Men	Abaz Arslanagić, Milorad Karalić, Đorđe Lavrnić, Dobrivoj Selec
Gold	(United States) 1984 Los Angeles	Women	Svetlana Kitić, Jasna Kolar-Merdan
Gold	(United States) 1984 Los Angeles	Men	Zlatan Arnautović, Jovica Elezović, Zdravko Rađenović, Branko Štrbac, Zdravko Zovko
Bronze	(South Korea) 1988 Seoul	Men	Iztok Puc, Zlatko Saračević, Irfan Smajlagić, Ermin Velić, Muhamed Memić

== See also ==
- List of flag bearers for Bosnia and Herzegovina at the Olympics
- Bosnia and Herzegovina at the Paralympics
- Bosnia and Herzegovina at the World Athletics Championships
