= List of flag bearers for Bosnia and Herzegovina at the Olympics =

Bosnia and Herzegovina at the Olympics
- IOC code: BIH
- NOC: Olympic Committee of Bosnia and Herzegovina
- Website: www.okbih.ba (in Bosnian, Serbian, and Croatian)
- Medals: Gold 0 Silver 0 Bronze 0 Total 0

Summer appearances
- 1992; 1996; 2000; 2004; 2008; 2012; 2016; 2020; 2024

Winter appearances
- 1994; 1998; 2002; 2006; 2010; 2014; 2018; 2022; 2026

Other related appearances
- Yugoslavia (1920–1992 W)

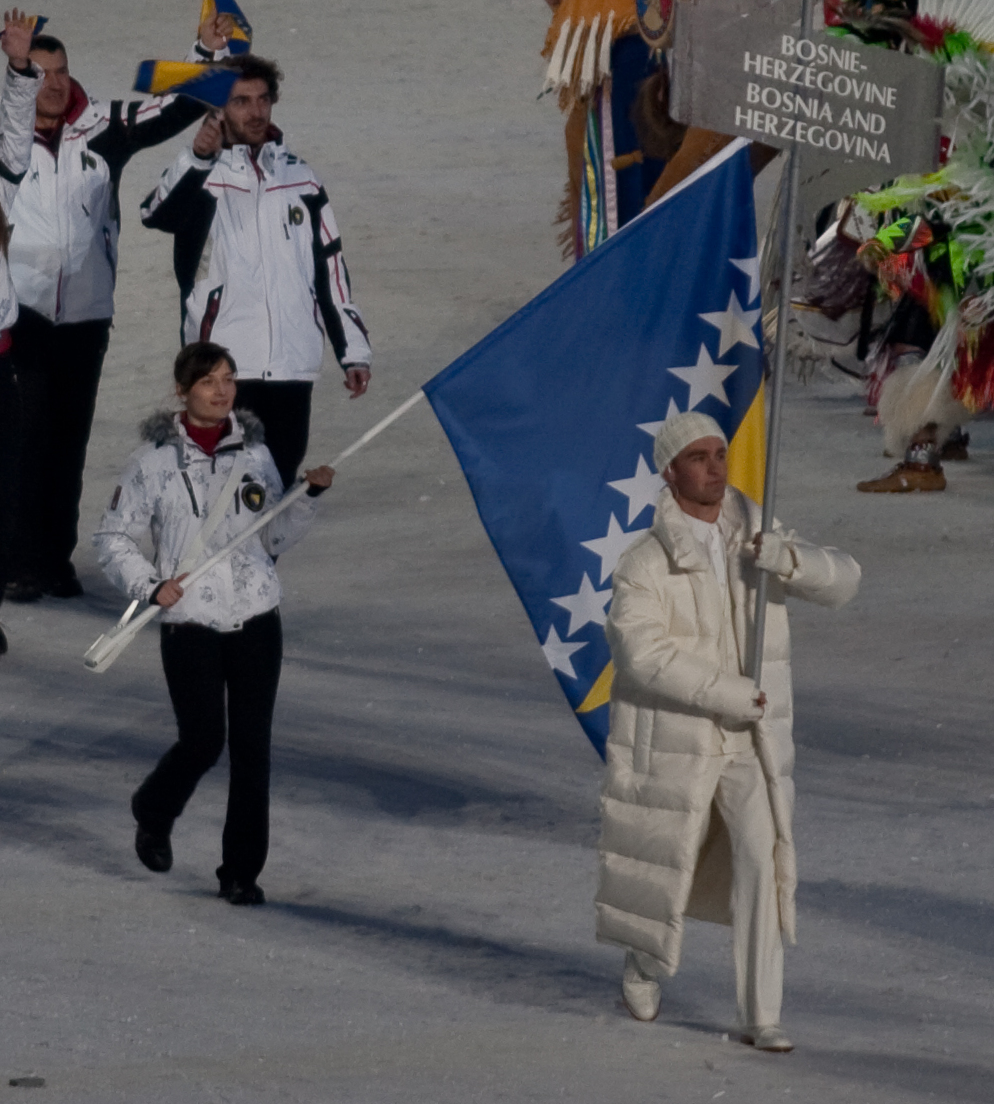
Žana Novaković - flag bearer in 2010

This is a list of flag bearers who have represented Bosnia and Herzegovina at the Olympics.

Flag bearers carry the national flag of their country at the opening ceremony of the Olympic Games.

#	Event year	Season	Flag bearer	Sport
1	1992	Summer	Zlatan Saračević	Athletics
2	1994	Winter	Bekim Babić	Cross-country skiing
3	1996	Summer	Islam Ðugum	Athletics
4	1998	Winter	Mario Franjić	Bobsleigh
5	2000	Summer	Elvir Krehmić	Athletics
6	2002	Winter	Enis Bećirbegović	Alpine skiing
7	2004	Summer	Nedžad Fazlija	Shooting
8	2006	Winter	Aleksandra Vasiljević	Biathlon
9	2008	Summer	Amel Mekić	Judo
10	2010	Winter	Žana Novaković	Alpine skiing
11	2012	Summer	Amel Mekić	Judo
12	2014	Winter	Žana Novaković	Alpine skiing
13	2016	Summer	Amel Tuka	Athletics
14	2018	Winter	Elvedina Muzaferija	Alpine skiing
15	2020	Summer	Larisa Cerić	Judo
15	2020	Summer	Amel Tuka	Athletics
16	2022	Winter	Elvedina Muzaferija	Alpine skiing
16	2022	Winter	Mirza Nikolajev	Luge
17	2024	Summer	Larisa Cerić	Judo
17	2024	Summer	Mesud Pezer	Athletics
18	2026	Winter	Marko Šljivić	Alpine skiing
18	2026	Winter	Elvedina Muzaferija	Alpine skiing

== See also ==
- Bosnia and Herzegovina at the Olympics
- List of flag bearers for Yugoslavia at the Olympics
