= Bosnia and Herzegovina at the 1998 Winter Olympics =

- IOC code: BIH
- NOC: Olympic Committee of Bosnia and Herzegovina
- Website: www.okbih.ba (in Bosnian, Serbian, and Croatian)

in Nagano
- Competitors: 8 (7 men, 1 woman) in 3 sports
- Flag bearer: Mario Franjić (bobsleigh)
- Medals: Gold 0 Silver 0 Bronze 0 Total 0

Winter Olympics appearances (overview)
- 1994; 1998; 2002; 2006; 2010; 2014; 2018; 2022; 2026

Other related appearances
- Yugoslavia (1924–1992)

Bosnia and Herzegovina was represented at the 1998 Winter Olympics in Nagano, Japan by the Olympic Committee of Bosnia and Herzegovina.

In total, eight athletes including seven men and one woman represented Bosnia and Herzegovina in three different sports including alpine skiing, bobsleigh and luge.

== Competitors ==
In total, eight athletes represented Bosnia and Herzegovina at the 1998 Winter Olympics in Nagano, Japan across three different sports.

Sport	Men	Women	Total
Alpine skiing	1	1	2
Bobsleigh	5	–	5
Luge	1	0	1
Total	7	1	8

== Alpine skiing ==
In total, two Bosnian and Herzegovinian athletes participated in the alpine skiing events – Enis Bećirbegović in the men's downhill, the men's super-G and the men's giant slalom and Arijana Boras in the women's super-G and the women's giant slalom.

The men's downhill was due to take place on 8 February 1998 but was postponed three times due to the weather and instead took place on 13 February 1998. Bećirbegović completed the course in a time of one minute 53.47 seconds to finish 21st overall.

The women's super-G was due to take place on 10 February 1998 but was postponed due to heavy snow and instead took place on 11 February 1998. Boras completed the course in a time of one minute 24.48 seconds to finish 39th overall.

The men's super-G took place on 16 February 1998. Bećirbegović completed the course in a time of one minute 37.58 seconds to finish 22nd overall.

The men's giant slalom was due to take place on 18 February 1998 but was postponed due to heavy snow and instead took place on 19 February 1998. Bećirbegović completed his first run in a time of one minute 26.15 seconds. He did not finish his second run.

The women's giant slalom took place on 20 February 1998. Boras did not finish her first run and did not take part in the second run.

Athlete	Event	Race 1	Race 2	Total	
Athlete	Event	Time	Time	Time	Rank
Enis Bećirbegović	Men's downhill			1:53.47	21
Enis Bećirbegović	Men's super-G			1:37.58	22
Enis Bećirbegović	Men's giant slalom	1:26.15	DNF	DNF	–
Arijana Boras	Women's super-G			1:24.48	39
Arijana Boras	Women's giant slalom	DNF	–	DNF	–

== Bobsleigh ==
In total, five Bosnian and Herzegovinian athletes participated in the bobsleigh events – Mario Franjić, Edin Krupalija, Nihad Mameledžija, Ognjen Sokolović and Zoran Sokolović.

The two-man bobsleigh took place on 14 and 15 February 1998. Across their four runs, Zoran Sokolović and Ognjen Sokolović recorded a combined time of three minutes 46.61 seconds and finished 31st overall.

The four-man bobsleigh took place on 20 and 21 February 1998. The second run was cancelled due to the weather so the event was reduced to three runs. Across their three runs, Bosnia and Herzegovina recorded a combined time of two minutes 45.67 seconds and finished 25th overall.

Sled	Athletes	Event	Run 1		Run 2		Run 3		Run 4		Total	
Sled	Athletes	Event	Time	Rank	Time	Rank	Time	Rank	Time	Rank	Time	Rank
BIH-1	Zoran Sokolović; Ognjen Sokolović	Two-man	57.36	38	56.62	31	56.32	29	56.31	30	3:46.61	31
BIH-1	Zoran Sokolović; Nihad Mameledžija; Edin Krupalija; Mario Franjić	Four-man	55.26	26	55.11	25	55.30	25	–		2:45.67	25

== Luge ==
In total, one Bosnian and Herzegovinian athlete participated in the luge events – Ismar Biogradlić in the men's singles.

The men's singles took place on 8 and 9 February 1998. Across his four runs, Biogradlić recorded a combined time of three minutes 25.169 seconds and finished 23rd overall.

Athlete	Run 1		Run 2		Run 3		Run 4		Total	
Athlete	Time	Rank	Time	Rank	Time	Rank	Time	Rank	Time	Rank
Ismar Biogradlić	51.252	25	51.170	25	51.384	24	51.363	24	3:25.169	23
