= Bosnia and Herzegovina at the 1994 Winter Olympics =

- IOC code: BIH
- NOC: Olympic Committee of Bosnia and Herzegovina
- Website: www.okbih.ba (in Bosnian, Serbian, and Croatian)

in Lillehammer
- Competitors: 10 in 4 sports
- Flag bearer: Bekim Babić
- Medals: Gold 0 Silver 0 Bronze 0 Total 0

Winter Olympics appearances (overview)
- 1994; 1998; 2002; 2006; 2010; 2014; 2018; 2022; 2026

Other related appearances
- Yugoslavia (1924–1992)

Bosnia and Herzegovina competed in the Winter Olympic Games as an independent nation for the first time at the 1994 Winter Olympics in Lillehammer, Norway. Previously, Bosnian and Herzegovinian athletes competed for Yugoslavia at the Olympic Games.

== Competitors ==
The following is the list of number of competitors in the Games.

Sport	Men	Women	Total
Alpine skiing	1	1	2
Bobsleigh	5	–	5
Cross-country skiing	1	0	1
Luge	1	1	2
Total	8	2	10

== Alpine skiing ==
Men

Athlete	Event	Final				
Athlete	Event	Run 1	Run 2	Run 3	Total	Rank
Enis Bećirbegović	Giant Slalom	DNF			DNF	

Women

Athlete	Event	Final				
Athlete	Event	Run 1	Run 2	Run 3	Total	Rank
Arijana Boras	Slalom	1:10.92	1:07.80		2:18.72	27

== Bobsleigh ==
Athlete	Event	Final					
Athlete	Event	Run 1	Run 2	Run 3	Run 4	Total	Rank
Zdravko Stojnić; Zoran Sokolović	Two-man bob	54.76	54.83	54.82	54.66	3:39.07	33
Zoran Sokolović; Izet Haračić; Nizar Zaćiragić; Igor Boras	Four-man bob	54.77	54.80	55.10	55.10	3:39.77	29

== Cross-country skiing ==
Men

Athlete	Event	Final					
Athlete	Event	Start	Rank	Time	Rank	Total	Rank
Bekim Babić	10 km Classical					30:44.3	84
Bekim Babić	15 km Free Pursuit	+06:24	84	46:59.6	74	+17:34.8	74

== Luge ==
Men

Athlete	Event	Final					
Athlete	Event	Run 1	Run 2	Run 3	Run 4	Total	Rank
Nedžad Lomigora	Singles	53.254	53.126	54.725	53.023	3:34.128	31

Women

Athlete	Event	Final					
Athlete	Event	Run 1	Run 2	Run 3	Run 4	Total	Rank
Verona Marjanović	Singles	50.856	51.707	51.365	51.121	3:24.779	23

== Sources ==
- Official Olympic Reports
