= Bosnia and Herzegovina at the 2022 Winter Paralympics =

- Flag of Bosnia and Herzegovina
- IPC code: BIH

in Beijing, China 4 March 2022 – 13 March 2022
- Competitors: 2 (1 on foot,1 on wheelchair) in 1 sport
- Flag bearers: Jovica Goreta; Ilma Kazazić
- Medals: Gold 0 Silver 0 Bronze 0 Total 0

Winter Paralympics appearances (overview)
- 2010; 2014; 2018; 2022; 2026

Other related appearances
- Yugoslavia (1972–1988)

Bosnia and Herzegovina competed at the 2022 Winter Paralympics in Beijing, China which took place between 4–13 March 2022. Two alpine skiers competed.

== Competitors ==
The following is the list of number of competitors participating at the Games per sport/discipline.

Sport	Men	Women	Total
Alpine skiing	1	1	2
Total	1	1	2

== Alpine skiing ==
Ilma Kazazić and Jovica Goreta competed in alpine skiing.

Athlete	Event	Run 1		Run 2		Total	
Athlete	Event	Time	Rank	Time	Rank	Time	Rank
Jovica Goreta	Men's slalom, standing	Did not finish					
Ilma Kazazić	Women's giant slalom, standing	1:18.97	20	1:24.43	16	2:43.40	16
Ilma Kazazić	Women's slalom, standing	1:14.21	12	Did not finish			

== See also ==
- Bosnia and Herzegovina at the Paralympics
- Bosnia and Herzegovina at the 2022 Winter Olympics
