= Bosnia and Herzegovina at the 2014 Winter Paralympics =

- IPC code: BIH
- NPC: Paralympic Committee of Bosnia and Herzegovina
- Website: www.pkbih.com

in Sochi
- Competitors: 2 in 1 sport
- Flag bearer: Ilma Kazazic
- Medals: Gold 0 Silver 0 Bronze 0 Total 0

Winter Paralympics appearances (overview)
- 2010; 2014; 2018; 2022; 2026

Other related appearances
- Yugoslavia (1972–1988)

Bosnia and Herzegovina sent a delegation to compete at the 2014 Winter Paralympics in Sochi, Russia from 7–16 March 2014. This was the second time the country had participated in a Winter Paralympic Games. The delegation consisted of two alpine skiers, Senad Turkovic and Ilma Kazazic. Neither of the two finished any of their events.

== Background ==
Bosnia and Herzegovina first participated in Paralympic competition at the 1996 Summer Paralympics, and their first Winter Paralympics appearance was fourteen years later, at the 2010 Winter Paralympics. They have participated in every Summer and Winter Paralympics since their respective debuts, making these 2014 Paralympics their second Winter Paralympic appearance. The 2014 Winter Paralympics were held from 7–16 March 2014, in Sochi, Russia; 45 countries and 547 athletes took part in the multi-sport event. The delegation Bosnia and Herzegovina sent to Sochi consisted of two alpine skiers, Ilma Kazazic and Senad Turkovic. Kazazic was chosen as the flag-bearer for the parade of nations during the opening ceremony and the closing ceremony.

== Disability classification ==
Every participant at the Paralympics has their disability grouped into one of five disability categories: amputation, which may be congenital or sustained through injury or illness; cerebral palsy; wheelchair athletes, though there is often overlap between this and other categories; visual impairment, including blindness; and Les autres, which is any physical disability that does not fall strictly under one of the other categories, like dwarfism or multiple sclerosis. Each Paralympic sport then has its own classifications, dependent upon the specific physical demands of competition. Events are given a code, made of numbers and letters, describing the type of event and classification of the athletes competing. Events with "B" in the code are for athletes with visual impairment, codes LW1 to LW9 are for athletes who stand to compete and LW10 to LW12 are for athletes who compete sitting down. Alpine skiing events grouped athletes into separate competitions for sitting, standing and visually impaired athletes.

== Alpine skiing ==
Both competitors said their preparations were hampered by a lack of snow in Bosnia and Herzegovina. Senad Turkovic was 45 years old at the time of the Sochi Paralympics. He has a limb defficency suffered as a result of war, and is classified as LW4, meaning he competes in a standing position. On 13 March, he failed to finish the first run of the Men's standing slalom, falling within the first ten seconds of his race. Two days later, in the Men's standing giant slalom, he finished the first run in a time of 1 minute and 58.16 seconds, which put him in 35th place. However, in the second run, he missed a gate, and was officially recorded as a "Did Not Finish" (DNF).

Ilma Kazazic was 15 years old at the time of these Paralympics. She was born with cerebral palsy, and is classified as an LW3, meaning she competes in a standing position. For the Sochi Paralympics, she was being coached by her teammate Turkovic. On 12 March, she failed to start the women's standing slalom for unspecified reasons. Four days later, in the women's standing giant slalom, she finished her first leg in a time of 2 minutes and 32.64 seconds, putting her in 19th place. In her second run, she fell twice, and missed a gate, causing her to be recorded as a DNF. She represented Bosnia and Herzegovina again at the 2018 Winter Paralympics.

Athlete	Event	Run 1			Run 2			Final/Total		
Athlete	Event	Time	Diff	Rank	Time	Diff	Rank	Time	Diff	Rank
Senad Turkovic	Men's slalom, standing	DNF								
Senad Turkovic	Men's giant slalom, standing	1:58.16	+43.44	35	DNF					
Ilma Kazazic	Women's slalom, standing	DNS								
Ilma Kazazic	Women's giant slalom, standing	2:32.64	+1:07.66	19	DNF					

== See also ==
- Bosnia and Herzegovina at the Paralympics
- Bosnia and Herzegovina at the 2014 Winter Olympics
