= Bosnia and Herzegovina at the 2006 Winter Olympics =

- IOC code: BIH
- NOC: Olympic Committee of Bosnia and Herzegovina
- Website: www.okbih.ba (in Bosnian, Serbian, and Croatian)

in Turin
- Competitors: 6 (3 men, 3 women) in 3 sports
- Flag bearers: Aleksandra Vasiljević (opening); Mojca Rataj (closing)
- Medals: Gold 0 Silver 0 Bronze 0 Total 0

Winter Olympics appearances (overview)
- 1994; 1998; 2002; 2006; 2010; 2014; 2018; 2022; 2026

Other related appearances
- Yugoslavia (1924–1992)

Bosnia and Herzegovina competed at the 2006 Winter Olympics in Turin, Italy.

== Alpine skiing ==
Athlete	Event	Final				
Athlete	Event	Run 1	Run 2	Run 3	Total	Rank
Mojca Rataj	Women's giant slalom	did not start				
Mojca Rataj	Women's slalom	45.34	49.03	n/a	1:34.37	31
Marco Schafferer	Men's giant slalom	1:39.28	1:25.18	n/a	3:04.46	37
Marco Schafferer	Men's slalom	1:01.11	56.06	n/a	1:57.17	30

== Biathlon ==
Athlete	Event	Final		
Athlete	Event	Time	Misses	Rank
Miro Ćosić	Men's sprint	32:56.1	4	85
Miro Ćosić	Men's individual	1:08:32.7	7	83
Aleksandra Vasiljević	Women's sprint	28:10.9	1	78
Aleksandra Vasiljević	Women's individual	1:01:11.8	1	74

== Cross-country skiing ==
Distance

Athlete	Event	Final	
Athlete	Event	Total	Rank
Bojan Samardžija	Men's 15 km classical	51:28.8	89
Vedrana Vučićević	Women's 10 km classical	42:45.8	70
