= Alpine skiing at the 2006 Winter Olympics – Men's giant slalom =

Men's giant slalom at the XX Olympic Winter Games
- Pictogram for alpine skiing
- Venue: Sestriere
- Date: February 20, 2006
- Competitors: 82 from 46 nations
- Winning time: 2:35.00

Medalists
| 1st place, gold medalist(s) | | Benjamin Raich | Austria |
| 2nd place, silver medalist(s) | | Joël Chenal | France |
| 3rd place, bronze medalist(s) | | Hermann Maier | Austria |

The giant slalom is conducted in two runs, with emphasis on manoeuvering rather than speed as the gates are fairly close together – but not as close as in slalom. The giant slalom also promotes endurance, with the primary difference between it and the slalom competition being the length of the course - the difference in level in giant slalom is 300 to 450 metres, while in slalom it is between 180 and 220 metres. This also leads to the gates being further apart in giant slalom. The men's giant slalom took place on 20 February.

Stephan Eberharter won the 2002 giant slalom gold, but he had since retired . The 2005 World Champion, Hermann Maier had skied ahead of the Olympics, however, and was fourth in the giant slalom World Cup – which was headed by Maier's compatriot Benjamin Raich.

== Results ==
Complete results from the men's giant slalom event at the 2006 Winter Olympics.

| Rank | Name | Country | Run 1 | Run 2 | Time | Difference |
|---|---|---|---|---|---|---|
| 1st place, gold medalist(s) | Benjamin Raich | Austria | 1:16.95 | 1:18.05 | 2:35.00 | +0.00 |
| 2nd place, silver medalist(s) | Joël Chenal | France | 1:16.80 | 1:18.27 | 2:35.07 | +0.07 |
| 3rd place, bronze medalist(s) | Hermann Maier | Austria | 1:16.83 | 1:18.33 | 2:35.16 | +0.16 |
| 4 | François Bourque | Canada | 1:16.61 | 1:19.31 | 2:35.92 | +0.92 |
| 5 | Fredrik Nyberg | Sweden | 1:16.83 | 1:19.22 | 2:36.05 | +1.05 |
| 6 | Bode Miller | United States | 1:17.58 | 1:18.48 | 2:36.06 | +1.06 |
| 6 | Aksel Lund Svindal | Norway | 1:17.10 | 1:18.96 | 2:36.06 | +1.06 |
| 8 | Rainer Schönfelder | Austria | 1:17.49 | 1:19.15 | 2:36.64 | +1.64 |
| 9 | Kalle Palander | Finland | 1:18.22 | 1:18.60 | 2:36.82 | +1.82 |
| 10 | Thomas Grandi | Canada | 1:17.23 | 1:19.65 | 2:36.88 | +1.88 |
| 11 | Massimiliano Blardone | Italy | 1:17.21 | 1:19.74 | 2:36.95 | +1.95 |
| 12 | Mitja Valenčič | Slovenia | 1:18.10 | 1:19.29 | 2:37.39 | +2.39 |
| 13 | Erik Schlopy | United States | 1:18.34 | 1:19.22 | 2:37.56 | +2.56 |
| 14 | Didier Défago | Switzerland | 1:18.03 | 1:19.57 | 2:37.60 | +2.60 |
| 15 | Alberto Schieppati | Italy | 1:18.21 | 1:19.62 | 2:37.83 | +2.83 |
| 16 | Ondřej Bank | Czech Republic | 1:18.45 | 1:19.40 | 2:37.85 | +2.85 |
| 17 | Marc Berthod | Switzerland | 1:19.05 | 1:19.20 | 2:38.25 | +3.25 |
| 18 | Lasse Kjus | Norway | 1:18.73 | 1:20.58 | 2:39.31 | +4.31 |
| 19 | Didier Cuche | Switzerland | 1:19.08 | 1:20.25 | 2:39.33 | +4.33 |
| 20 | Bjarne Solbakken | Norway | 1:19.15 | 1:20.46 | 2:39.61 | +4.61 |
| 21 | Raphaël Burtin | France | 1:20.70 | 1:20.29 | 2:40.99 | +5.99 |
| 22 | Jukka Rajala | Finland | 1:20.17 | 1:21.23 | 2:41.40 | +6.40 |
| 23 | Cristian Javier Simari Birkner | Argentina | 1:22.37 | 1:20.19 | 2:42.56 | +7.56 |
| 24 | Daisuke Yoshioka | Japan | 1:23.78 | 1:21.25 | 2:45.03 | +10.03 |
| 25 | Natko Zrnčić-Dim | Croatia | 1:22.57 | 1:23.02 | 2:45.59 | +10.59 |
| 26 | Nikolay Skriabin | Ukraine | 1:25.81 | 1:25.04 | 2:50.85 | +15.85 |
| 27 | Alexander Heath | South Africa | 1:25.61 | 1:25.81 | 2:51.42 | +16.42 |
| 28 | Kim Hyeong-cheol | South Korea | 1:26.09 | 1:26.37 | 2:52.46 | +17.46 |
| 29 | Iason Abramashvili | Georgia | 1:27.59 | 1:27.27 | 2:54.86 | +19.86 |
| 30 | Nikolai Hentsch | Brazil | 1:27.78 | 1:27.78 | 2:55.56 | +20.56 |
| 31 | Thomas Foley | Ireland | 1:28.28 | 1:29.14 | 2:57.42 | +22.42 |
| 32 | Mikail Renzhin | Israel | 1:28.97 | 1:31.44 | 3:00.41 | +25.41 |
| 33 | Viktor Ryabchenko | Kazakhstan | 1:29.52 | 1:31.14 | 3:00.66 | +25.66 |
| 34 | Theodoros Christodoulou | Cyprus | 1:30.47 | 1:31.56 | 3:02.03 | +27.03 |
| 35 | Erjon Tola | Albania | 1:30.87 | 1:32.02 | 3:02.89 | +27.89 |
| 36 | Alidad Saveh-Shemshaki | Iran | 1:32.27 | 1:31.61 | 3:03.88 | +28.88 |
| 37 | Marko Schafferer | Bosnia and Herzegovina | 1:39.28 | 1:25.18 | 3:04.46 | +29.46 |
| 38 | Attila Marosi | Hungary | 1:32.30 | 1:32.82 | 3:05.12 | +30.12 |
| 39 | Mathieu Razanakolona | Madagascar | 1:39.10 | 1:27.33 | 3:06.43 | +31.43 |
| 40 | Li Guangxu | China | 1:32.63 | 1:35.44 | 3:08.07 | +33.07 |
| 41 | Ivan Borisov | Kyrgyzstan | 1:59.49 | 1:37.61 | 3:37.10 | +1:02.10 |
| | Kjetil Jansrud | Norway | 1:19.32 | DNS | | |
| | Hamit Şare | Turkey | 1:52.13 | DNS | | |
| | Stephan Görgl | Austria | 1:17.15 | DNF | | |
| | Jean-Philippe Roy | Canada | 1:17.36 | DNF | | |
| | Martin Vráblík | Czech Republic | 1:20.41 | DNF | | |
| | Deyvid Oprja | Estonia | 1:40.49 | DNF | | |
| | Daron Rahlves | United States | DNF | | | |
| | Davide Simoncelli | Italy | DNF | | | |
| | Marco Büchel | Liechtenstein | DNF | | | |
| | Ted Ligety | United States | DNF | | | |
| | Manfred Mölgg | Italy | DNF | | | |
| | Thomas Fanara | France | DNF | | | |
| | Aleš Gorza | Slovenia | DNF | | | |
| | Daniel Albrecht | Switzerland | DNF | | | |
| | Gauthier de Tessières | France | DNF | | | |
| | Ryan Semple | Canada | DNF | | | |
| | Felix Neureuther | Germany | DNF | | | |
| | Bernard Vajdič | Slovenia | DNF | | | |
| | Bradley Wall | Australia | DNF | | | |
| | Petr Záhrobský | Czech Republic | DNF | | | |
| | Björgvin Björgvinsson | Iceland | DNF | | | |
| | Claudio Sprecher | Liechtenstein | DNF | | | |
| | Dmitry Ulyanov | Russia | DNF | | | |
| | Pavel Chestakov | Russia | DNF | | | |
| | Konstantin Sats | Russia | DNF | | | |
| | Kryštof Krýzl | Czech Republic | DNF | | | |
| | Min Heuk Kang | South Korea | DNF | | | |
| | Akira Sasaki | Japan | DNF | | | |
| | Facundo Aguirre | Argentina | DNF | | | |
| | Duncan Grob | Chile | DNF | | | |
| | Kim Woo-sung | South Korea | DNF | | | |
| | Vassilis Dimitriadis | Greece | DNF | | | |
| | Ivan Ratkić | Croatia | DNF | | | |
| | Kristján Uni Óskarsson | Iceland | DNF | | | |
| | Olivier Jenot | Monaco | DNF | | | |
| | Gjorgi Markovski | Macedonia | DNF | | | |
| | Andrei Drygin | Tajikistan | DNF | | | |
| | Leyti Seck | Senegal | DNF | | | |
| | Hira Lal | India | DNF | | | |
| | Marino Cardelli | San Marino | DNF | | | |
| | Vitalij Rumiancev | Lithuania | DSQ | | | |
