= Bosnia and Herzegovina at the 2026 Winter Paralympics =

- Flag of Bosnia and Herzegovina
- IPC code: BIH
- NPC: Paralympic Committee of Bosnia and Herzegovina

in Milan & Cortina d'Ampezzo, Italy 6 March 2026 – 15 March 2026
- Competitors: 1 (1 woman) in 1 sport
- Flag bearer (opening): Ilma Kazazić
- Flag bearer (closing): Ilma Kazazić
- Medals: Gold 0 Silver 0 Bronze 0 Total 0

Winter Paralympics appearances (overview)
- 2010; 2014; 2018; 2022; 2026

Other related appearances
- Yugoslavia (1972–1988)

Bosnia and Herzegovina will compete at the 2026 Winter Paralympics in Milan & Cortina d'Ampezzo, Italy, which will take place between 6–15 March 2026.

== Competitors ==
The following is the list of number of competitors participating at the Games per sport/discipline.

Sport	Men	Women	Total
Para alpine skiing	0	1	1
Total	0	1	1

== Para alpine skiing ==
Athlete	Class	Event	Run 1		Run 2		Total	
Athlete	Class	Event	Time	Rank	Time	Rank	Time	Rank
Ilma Kazazić	LW3	Women's giant slalom, standing	DNF					
Ilma Kazazić	LW3	Women's slalom, standing	1:08.30	18	1:09.59	17	2:17.89	17

== See also ==
- Bosnia and Herzegovina at the Paralympics
- Bosnia and Herzegovina at the 2026 Winter Olympics
