= Igor Laikert =

Bosnia and Herzegovina alpine skier (born 1991)

Personal information
- Born: 27 February 1991 (age 35) Zenica, SR Bosnia and Herzegovina, SFR Yugoslavia

Skiing career
- Sport: Alpine skiing
- Disciplines: Slalom
- World Cup debut: 6 January 2011 (age 19)

Olympics
- Teams: 1 (2014)

World Championships
- Teams: 4 – (2011–17)

World Cup
- Seasons: 5 – (2011–15)

Igor Laikert (born 27 February 1991 in Zenica, Bosnia and Herzegovina) is an alpine skier from Bosnia and Herzegovina. He will compete for Bosnia and Herzegovina at the 2014 Winter Olympics in all the alpine skiing events.

The selection of alpine skier Žana Novaković as flagbearer for the 2014 Winter Olympics resulted in controversy as Igor Laikert had better results. There were suggestions that this had to due with the ethnic divide in the country with Laikert coming from the Muslim-Croat community.

Laikert participated at the 2011 World Military Skiing Championship in Bjelašnica he finished at 9th place in the men's Giant slalom event.

== World Cup results ==
=== Results per discipline ===
Discipline	WC starts	WC Top 30	WC Top 15	WC Top 5	WC Podium	Best result		
Discipline	WC starts	WC Top 30	WC Top 15	WC Top 5	WC Podium	Date	Location	Place
Slalom	7	0	0	0	0	9 March 2014	Kranjska Gora, Slovenia	57th
Giant slalom	2	0	0	0	0	26 October 2014	Sölden, Austria	62nd
Super-G	0	0	0	0	0			
Downhill	0	0	0	0	0			
Combined	0	0	0	0	0			
Total	9	0	0	0	0			

== World Championship results ==
Year
Year	Age	Slalom	Giant; Slalom	Super G	Downhill	Combined	Team Event
2011	19	—	—	38	43	23	—
2013	21	DNFQ1	—	48	DNF	21	—
2015	23	DNF1	46	50	—	—	—
2017	25	DNFQ2	DNFQ2	—	—	—	—

== Olympic results ==
Year
Year	Age	Slalom	Giant; Slalom	Super G	Downhill	Combined
2014	22	DNF2	DNF1	50	44	27

== See also ==
- Bosnia and Herzegovina at the 2014 Winter Olympics
