= Bosnia and Herzegovina at the 2018 Winter Olympics =

- Flag of Bosnia and Herzegovina
- IOC code: BIH
- NOC: Olympic Committee of Bosnia and Herzegovina
- Website: www.okbih.ba (in Bosnian, Serbian, and Croatian)

in Pyeongchang, South Korea 9–25 February 2018
- Competitors: 4 (2 men and 2 women) in 2 sports
- Flag bearer: Elvedina Muzaferija
- Medals: Gold 0 Silver 0 Bronze 0 Total 0

Winter Olympics appearances (overview)
- 1994; 1998; 2002; 2006; 2010; 2014; 2018; 2022; 2026

Other related appearances
- Yugoslavia (1924–1992)

Bosnia and Herzegovina competed at the 2018 Winter Olympics in PyeongChang, South Korea, from 9 to 25 February 2018, with four competitors in two sports.

== Competitors ==
The following is the list of number of competitors participating in the delegation per sport.

Sport	Men	Women	Total
Alpine skiing	1	1	2
Cross-country skiing	1	1	2
Total	2	2	4

== Alpine skiing ==
Bosnia and Herzegovina qualified two athletes, one male and one female.

Athlete	Event	Run 1		Run 2		Total	
Athlete	Event	Time	Rank	Time	Rank	Time	Rank
Emir Lokmić	Men's giant slalom	1:14.55	44	DNF			
Emir Lokmić	Men's slalom	DNF					
Elvedina Muzaferija	Women's downhill	—N/a				1:46.80	31
Elvedina Muzaferija	Women's super-G	—N/a				1:27.97	42
Elvedina Muzaferija	Women's giant slalom	1:19.33	49	1:15.57	44	2:34.90	44
Elvedina Muzaferija	Women's slalom	DNF					

== Cross-country skiing ==
Bosnia and Herzegovina qualified two athletes, one male and one female.

Distance

Athlete	Event	Final		
Athlete	Event	Time	Deficit	Rank
Mladen Plakalović	Men's 15 km freestyle	38:27.7	+4:43.8	76
Tanja Karišik	Women's 10 km freestyle	29:24.3	+4:23.8	65

== See also ==
- Bosnia and Herzegovina at the 2018 Summer Youth Olympics
