= Zoran Sokolović =

Zoran Sokolović may refer to:

- Zoran Sokolović (politician), Serbian politician
- Zoran Sokolović (bobsleigh), Bosnian bobsledder
