= Bosnia and Herzegovina at the 2002 Winter Olympics =

- IOC code: BIH
- NOC: Olympic Committee of Bosnia and Herzegovina
- Website: www.okbih.ba (in Bosnian, Serbian, and Croatian)

in Salt Lake City
- Competitors: 2 (men) in 1 sport
- Flag bearer: Enis Bećirbegović
- Medals: Gold 0 Silver 0 Bronze 0 Total 0

Winter Olympics appearances (overview)
- 1994; 1998; 2002; 2006; 2010; 2014; 2018; 2022; 2026

Other related appearances
- Yugoslavia (1924–1992)

Bosnia and Herzegovina sent a delegation to compete at the 2002 Winter Olympics in Salt Lake City, United States, from 8 to 24 February 2002. This was the nation's third time participating in a Winter Olympic Games. The delegation consisted of two alpine skiers, Tahir Bisić and Enis Bećirbegović. Bisić finished in 29th place in the men's slalom, and 44th in the giant slalom. Bećirbegović failed to finish the giant slalom, his only event.

== Background ==
The Olympic Committee of Bosnia and Herzegovina was recognized by the International Olympic Committee on 31 December 1992. Despite this, they made their first Olympic appearance at the 1992 Summer Olympics, and their first Winter Olympics performance at the 1994 Winter Olympics. They have participated in every Olympics since then, making Salt Lake City their third time appearing at a Winter Olympics. The Bosnia and Herzegovinan delegation to Salt Lake City consisted of two alpine skiers, Tahir Bisić and Enis Bećirbegović. Bećirbegović was selected as the flag bearer for the opening ceremony and the closing ceremony.

== Alpine skiing ==
Enis Bećirbegović was 25 years old at the time of the Salt Lake City Olympics, and was a veteran of the 1992, 1994, and 1998 Winter Olympics. Tahir Bisić was 20 years old then, and making his only Olympic appearance. On 13 February, Bisić took part in the men's combined, which consisted of a run of downhill, followed by two runs of slalom. He finished the downhill run in 1 minute and 48.68 seconds, which put him in 40th and next to last position. However, he failed to finish the first of the two slalom runs, and was eliminated from the competition. The gold medal in the combined was won by Kjetil André Aamodt of Norway, the silver medal was won by America's Bode Miller, and the bronze was taken by Benjamin Raich of Austria.

Both Bećirbegović and Bisić competed in the men's giant slalom on 21 February. In the first run, Bisić completed the race with a time of 1 minute and 18.96 seconds. He completed the second run in a time of 1 minute and 17.21 seconds, for a final time of 2 minutes and 36.17 seconds, which put him in 44th place. Bećirbegović didn't fare as well, while he completed the first run in 1 minute and 17.56 seconds, he failed to finish the second run. For the event, the gold medal time was 2 minutes and 23.28 seconds, set by Stephan Eberharter of Austria, the silver by Miller, and the bronze by Lasse Kjus of Norway. On 23 February, Bisić was one of the competitors in the men's slalom, finishing the first run in 57.55 seconds. He was slower on the second run, finishing in 1 minute and 0.17 seconds, making his total time for the event 1 minute and 57.72 seconds, which put him in 29th place. The gold medalist was Jean-Pierre Vidal of France, who set a time of 1 minute and 41.06 seconds; the silver medal was won by fellow Frenchman Sébastien Amiez, and the bronze medal was taken by Raich.

Athlete	Event	Race 1	Race 2	Total	
Athlete	Event	Time	Time	Time	Rank
Tahir Bisić	Giant Slalom	1:18.96	1:17.21	2:36.17	44
Enis Bećirbegović	Giant Slalom	1:17.56	DNF	DNF	–
Tahir Bisić	Slalom	57.55	1:00.17	1:57.72	29

Men's combined

Athlete	Downhill	Slalom		Total	
Athlete	Time	Time 1	Time 2	Total time	Rank
Tahir Bisić	1:48.68	DNF	–	DNF	–
