= Bosnia and Herzegovina at the 2010 Winter Olympics =

- IOC code: BIH
- NOC: Olympic Committee of Bosnia and Herzegovina
- Website: www.okbih.ba (in Bosnian, Serbian, and Croatian)

in Vancouver
- Competitors: 5 in 3 sports
- Flag bearer: Žana Novaković
- Medals: Gold 0 Silver 0 Bronze 0 Total 0

Winter Olympics appearances (overview)
- 1994; 1998; 2002; 2006; 2010; 2014; 2018; 2022; 2026

Other related appearances
- Yugoslavia (1924–1992)

Bosnia and Herzegovina competed at the 2010 Winter Olympics in Vancouver, British Columbia, Canada.

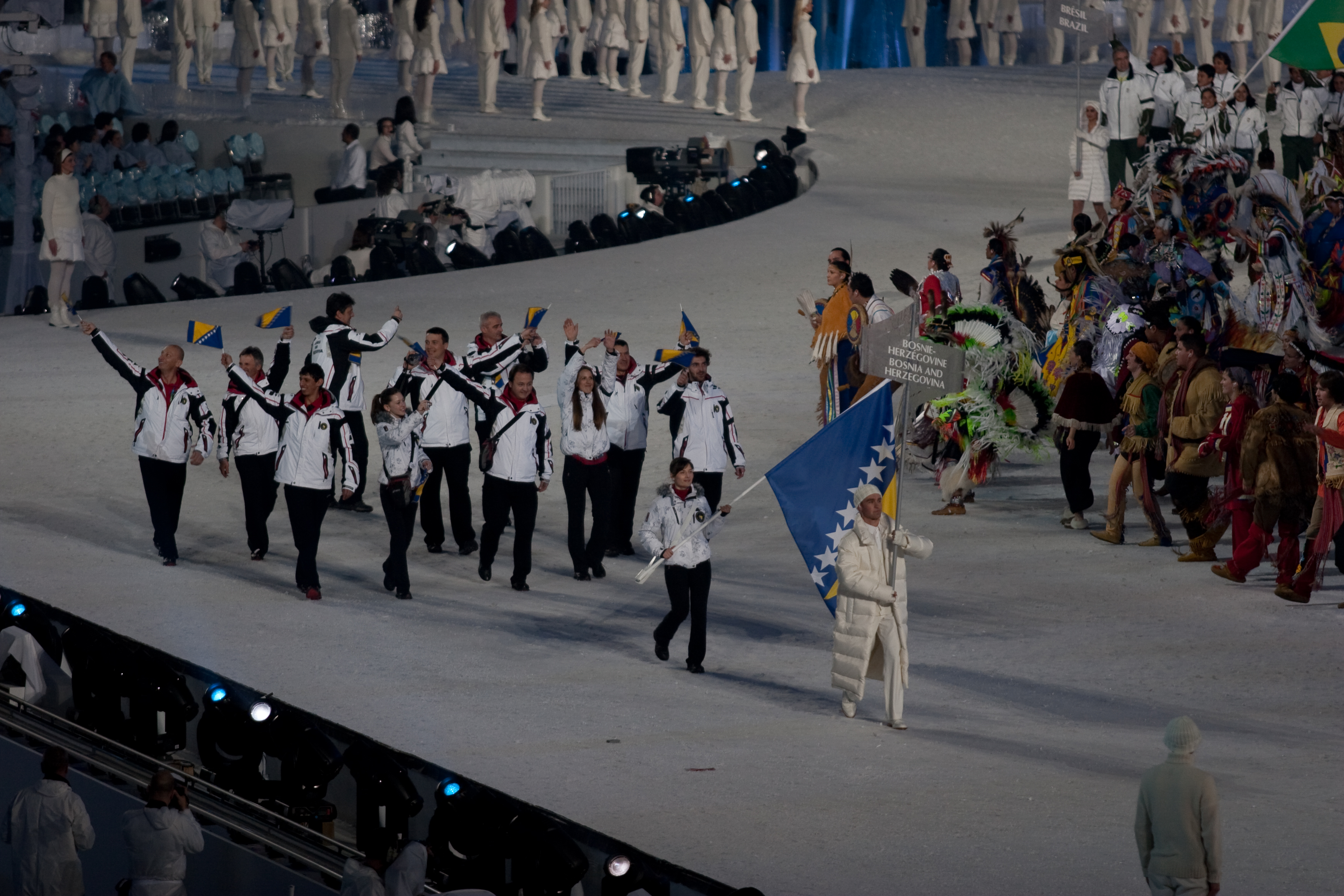
The athletes entering the stadium during the opening ceremonies.

== Alpine skiing ==
Athlete	Event	Run 1	Run 2	Total	Rank
Marko Rudić	Men's slalom	53.70	55.46	1:49.16	36
Maja Klepić	Women's slalom	59.43	DNF		
Žana Novaković	Women's slalom	58.19	57.76	1:55.95	40

== Biathlon ==
Athlete	Event	Final		
Athlete	Event	Time	Misses	Rank
Tanja Karišik	Women's sprint	25:24.1	2	88

== Cross-country skiing ==
Bosnia and Herzegovina has qualified two entrants in cross-country skiing.

Athlete	Event	Final	
Athlete	Event	Total	Rank
Mladen Plakalović	Men's 15 kilometre freestyle	39:41.4	78
Tanja Karišik	Women's 10 kilometre freestyle	31:30.4	72

== See also ==
- Bosnia and Herzegovina at the Olympics
- Bosnia and Herzegovina at the 2010 Winter Paralympics
