= Bosnia and Herzegovina at the 2014 Winter Olympics =

- IOC code: BIH
- NOC: Olympic Committee of Bosnia and Herzegovina
- Website: www.okbih.ba (in Bosnian, Serbian, and Croatian)

in Sochi
- Competitors: 5 in 3 sports
- Flag bearers: Žana Novaković (opening and closing)
- Medals: Gold 0 Silver 0 Bronze 0 Total 0

Winter Olympics appearances (overview)
- 1994; 1998; 2002; 2006; 2010; 2014; 2018; 2022; 2026

Other related appearances
- Yugoslavia (1924–1992)

Bosnia and Herzegovina competed at the 2014 Winter Olympics in Sochi, Russia, from 7 to 23 February 2014. The team consists of five athletes in three sports. The team marched in the opening ceremony wearing clothes that paid homage to the 30th anniversary of the 1984 Winter Olympics held in Sarajevo.

The selection of alpine skier Žana Novaković as flagbearer resulted in controversy as another skier, Igor Laikert, had better results. There were suggestions that this had to do with the ethnic divide in the country with Laikert coming from the Muslim-Croat community.

== Alpine skiing ==
According to the quota allocation released on 20 January 2014, Bosnia and Herzegovina had three athletes in qualification positions.

| Athlete | Event | Run 1 | | Run 2 | | Total | |
| Athlete | Event | Time | Rank | Time | Rank | Time | Rank |
|---|---|---|---|---|---|---|---|
| Igor Laikert | Men's combined | 1:59.76 | 44 | 55.94 | 24 | 2:55.70 | 27 |
| Igor Laikert | Men's downhill | —N/a | | | | 2:15.07 | 44 |
| Igor Laikert | Men's giant slalom | DNF | | | | | |
| Igor Laikert | Men's slalom | 54.68 | 52 | DNF | | | |
| Igor Laikert | Men's super-G | —N/a | | | | 1:24.20 | 50 |
| Marko Rudić | Men's giant slalom | 1:29.55 | 53 | 1:30.40 | 49 | 2:59.95 | 49 |
| Marko Rudić | Men's slalom | DNF | | | | | |
| Žana Novaković | Women's giant slalom | 1:24.54 | 42 | 1:23.24 | 38 | 2:47.78 | 37 |
| Žana Novaković | Women's slalom | 59.79 | 35 | 56.20 | 25 | 1:55.99 | 26 |

== Biathlon ==
Bosnia and Herzegovina received a reallocation quota spot in biathlon. Tanja Karišik also competed in cross-country skiing.

| Athlete | Event | Time | Misses | Rank |
|---|---|---|---|---|
| Tanja Karišik | Women's individual | DNF | 1 | DNF |
| Tanja Karišik | Women's sprint | 25:06.8 | 2 (1+1) | 78 |

== Cross-country skiing ==
According to the quota allocation released on 20 January 2014, Bosnia and Herzegovina had two athletes in qualification positions.

Distance

| Athlete | Event | Final | | |
| Athlete | Event | Time | Deficit | Rank |
|---|---|---|---|---|
| Mladen Plakalović | Men's 50 km freestyle | DNF | | |
| Tanja Karišik | Women's 10 km classical | 41:34.6 | +13:16.8 | 69 |

Sprint

| Athlete | Event | Qualification | | Quarterfinal | | Semifinal | | Final | |
| Athlete | Event | Time | Rank | Time | Rank | Time | Rank | Time | Rank |
|---|---|---|---|---|---|---|---|---|---|
| Mladen Plakalović | Men's sprint | 4:40.64 | 82 | did not advance | | | | | |
