= Bosnia and Herzegovina at the 2010 Winter Paralympics =

- IPC code: BIH
- NPC: Paralympic Committee of Bosnia and Herzegovina
- Website: www.pkbih.com

in Vancouver
- Competitors: 1 in 1 sport
- Flag bearer: Nijaz Memic
- Medals: Gold 0 Silver 0 Bronze 0 Total 0

Winter Paralympics appearances (overview)
- 2010; 2014; 2018; 2022; 2026

Other related appearances
- Yugoslavia (1972–1988)

Bosnia and Herzegovina sent a delegation to compete at the 2010 Winter Paralympics, in Vancouver. It fielded a single athlete, in alpine skiing.

Although Bosnia and Herzegovina had been taking part in the Summer Paralympics since 1996, this was the country's first participation in the Winter Paralympic Games.

== Alpine skiing ==
The following athlete was Bosnia and Herzegovina's sole representative in alpine skiing:

Athlete	Event	Final			
Athlete	Event	Run 1	Run 2	Total Time	Rank
Nijaz Memic	Slalom standing	1:29.23	1:26.81	2:56.04	39
Nijaz Memic	Giant slalom standing	1:48.37	1:54.68	3:43.05	39

== See also ==
- Bosnia and Herzegovina at the 2010 Winter Olympics
- Bosnia and Herzegovina at the Paralympics
