= Jelen Franjić =

Dutch bobsledder (born 2000)

Personal information
- Nationality: Dutch
- Born: 12 June 2000 (age 26) Breda, Netherlands
- Height: 198 cm (6 ft 6 in)
- Weight: 95 kg (209 lb)

Sport
- Country: Netherlands
- Sport: Bobsleigh
- Events: Two-man, Four-man

Jelen Franjić (born 12 June 2000) is a Dutch bobsledder. He represented the Netherlands at the 2022 and 2026 Winter Olympics.

He is the son of Mario Franjić, who was an Olympic bobsledder for both Yugoslavia and Bosnia and Herzegovina. His brother Janko Franjić is also a bobsledder, and the two are teammates in four-man competition.

== Career ==
Franjić began as a track and field athlete. He began to compete in bobsleigh in 2018, after watching his brother Janko participate in the sport. Both began to compete for the team of pilot Ivo de Bruin in 2020. The team initially failed to qualify for the 2022 Winter Olympics, but were later added by the NOC*NSF to participate. Franjić competed in both two-man and four-man. He returned for the 2026 Winter Olympics, now with the team of Dave Wesselink in both two-man and four-man.

== Personal life ==
Franjić studied business administration at Erasmus University Rotterdam.

== Bobsleigh results ==
All results are sourced from the International Bobsleigh and Skeleton Federation (IBSF).

=== Olympic Games ===
Event	Two-man	Four-man
(China) 2022 Beijing	23rd	26th
(Italy) 2026 Milano Cortina	10th	13th

=== World Championships ===
Event	Two-man	Four-man
(Germany) 2024 Winterberg	19th	16th
