= Janko Franjić =

Dutch bobsledder (born 1994)

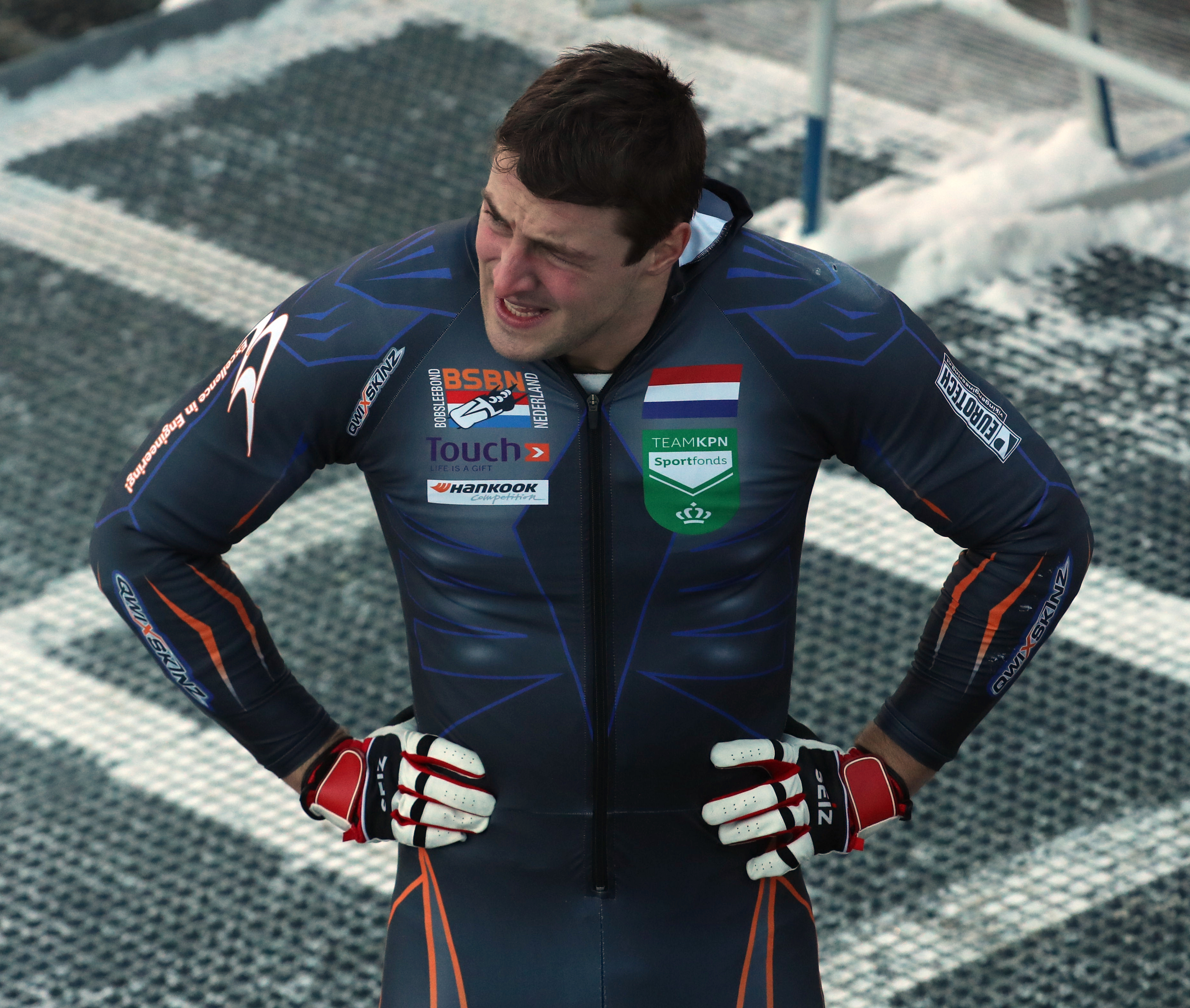
- Franjić in 2021

Personal information
- Nationality: Dutch
- Born: 29 March 1994 (age 32) Breda, Netherlands
- Height: 189 cm (6 ft 2 in)
- Weight: 96.5 kg (213 lb)

Sport
- Country: Netherlands
- Sport: Bobsleigh
- Event: Four-man

Janko Franjić (born 29 March 1994) is a Dutch bobsledder. He represented the Netherlands at the 2022 and 2026 Winter Olympics in four-man.

He is the son of Mario Franjić, who was a bobsledder for both Yugoslavia and Bosnia and Herzegovina. His brother Jelen Franjić is also a bobsledder, and the two are teammates on the Dutch bobsledding team.

== Career ==
Franjić initially began sport in both track and field and in weightlifting. He began bobsledding in 2017. After his brother Jelen began competing, they both competed for the team of Ivo de Bruin. The team initially failed to qualify for the 2022 Winter Olympics, but were later added by the NOC*NSF to participate. Franjić competed in the four-man, where the team finished 26th. He returned to the Olympics in 2026, now on the team of Dave Wesselink in four-man. The team finished 13th.

== Bobsleigh results ==
All results are sourced from the International Bobsleigh and Skeleton Federation (IBSF).

=== Olympic Games ===
Event	Four-man
(China) 2022 Beijing	26th
(Italy) 2026 Milano Cortina	13th

=== World Championships ===
Event	Two-man	Four-man
(Germany) 2024 Winterberg	19th	16th

=== World Championships ===
Event	Two-man	Four-man
(Germany) 2017 Königssee	—	24th
(Canada) 2019 Whistler	—	DNF
(Germany) 2021 Altenberg	23rd	17th
(Germany) 2024 Winterberg	—	16th
