= Luge at the 1998 Winter Olympics – Men's singles =

Men's singles at the XVIII Olympic Winter Games
- Venue: Spiral
- Dates: 8–9 February 1998
- Competitors: 34 from 18 nations
- Winning time: 3:18.436

Medalists
1st place, gold medalist(s)		Georg Hackl	Germany
2nd place, silver medalist(s)		Armin Zöggeler	Italy
3rd place, bronze medalist(s)		Jens Müller	Germany

The men's singles luge competition at the 1998 Winter Olympics in Nagano was held on 8 and 9 February, at Spiral.

== Summary ==
The event was won by Georg Hackl, who became the first luger to win the gold medal in 3 successive Winter Olympics after winning the event in Albertville and Lillehammer. Armin Zöggeler of Italy took silver and Jens Müller - the bronze medal. Markus Prock, the silver medalist from Lillehammer, finished outside medal position in 4th.

== Event schedule ==
All times are (UTC+9).

Date	Time	Event
8 February	14:00	Run 1
8 February		Run 2
9 February	14:00	Run 3
9 February		Run 4

== Results ==
Rank	Bib	Athlete	Country	Run 1	Rank	Run 2	Rank	Run 3	Rank	Run 4	Rank	Total	Deficit
1st place, gold medalist(s)	3	Georg Hackl	Germany	49.619	1	49.573	1	49.614	1	49.630	1	3:18.436	—
2nd place, silver medalist(s)	8	Armin Zöggeler	Italy	49.715	2	49.690	2	49.737	3	49.797	3	3:18.939	+0.503
3rd place, bronze medalist(s)	11	Jens Müller	Germany	49.954	4	49.700	3	49.729	2	49.710	2	3:19.093	+0.657
4	4	Markus Prock	Austria	49.861	3	49.732	4	49.863	4	50.200	11	3:19.656	+1.220
5	9	Markus Kleinheinz	Austria	50.016	5	49.779	5	49.918	8	50.011	9	3:19.724	+1.288
6	1	Wendel Suckow	United States	50.069	6	49.871	7	49.908	6	49.880	5	3:19.728	+1.292
7	10	Gerhard Gleirscher	Austria	50.161	9	49.816	6	49.911	7	49.897	7	3:19.785	+1.349
8	7	Reinhold Rainer	Italy	50.105	8	50.008	9	49.897	5	49.936	8	3:19.946	+1.510
9	12	Adam Heidt	United States	50.401	13	49.899	8	49.971	9	49.827	4	3:20.098	+1.662
10	5	Norbert Huber	Italy	50.100	7	50.129	11	50.026	10	49.883	6	3:20.138	+1.702
11	6	Mikael Holm	Sweden	50.324	11	50.197	14	50.146	13	50.131	10	3:20.798	+2.362
12	2	Karsten Albert	Germany	50.353	12	50.172	13	50.080	11	50.499	17	3:21.104	+2.668
13	20	Larry Dolan	United States	50.558	15	50.163	12	50.140	12	50.267	12	3:21.128	+2.692
14	34	Mārtiņš Rubenis	Latvia	50.758	22	50.491	19	50.603	16	50.300	13	3:22.152	+3.716
15	15	Clay Ives	Canada	50.632	17	50.348	16	50.858	21	50.437	16	3:22.275	+3.839
16	13	Shigeaki Ushijima	Japan	50.747	20	50.405	17	50.716	19	50.435	15	3:22.303	+3.867
17	21	Guntis Rēķis	Latvia	50.676	18	50.296	15	50.545	15	50.798	22	3:22.315	+3.879
18	17	Tyler Seitz	Canada	50.689	19	50.948	23	50.400	14	50.405	14	3:22.442	+4.006
19	18	Bengt Walden	Sweden	50.750	21	50.479	18	50.722	20	50.601	18	3:22.552	+4.116
20	19	Aleksandr Zubkov	Russia	50.488	14	50.944	22	50.650	17	50.619	19	3:22.701	+4.265
21	31	Anders Söderberg	Sweden	50.878	23	50.696	21	50.708	18	50.747	21	3:23.029	+4.593
22	14	Reto Gilly	Switzerland	50.594	16	50.646	20	51.485	25	50.627	20	3:23.352	+4.916
23	34	Ismar Biogradlić	Bosnia and Herzegovina	51.252	25	51.170	25	51.384	24	51.363	24	3:25.169	+6.733
24	29	Spyros Pinas	Greece	51.628	28	51.123	24	51.335	22	51.294	23	3:25.380	+6.944
25	30	Sandris Berzinš	Latvia	51.220	24	51.370	26	51.341	23	51.460	25	3:25.391	+6.955
26	32	Ion Cristian Stanciu	Romania	51.608	27	51.386	27	51.927	27	51.602	26	3:26.523	+8.087
27	33	Patrick Singleton	Bermuda	51.434	26	51.579	28	51.839	26	52.243	28	3:27.095	+8.659
28	25	Shiva Keshavan	India	52.315	29	52.127	29	52.043	28	51.900	27	3:28.385	+9.949
29	23	Lee Gi-ro	South Korea	54.299	32	52.875	30	53.472	30	54.075	29	3:34.721	+16.285
30	28	Hsieh Hsiang-chun	Chinese Taipei	54.192	31	53.093	31	53.325	29	54.159	30	3:34.769	+16.333
31	22	Gang Gwang-bae	South Korea	53.492	30	53.829	32	53.685	31	54.952	31	3:35.958	+17.522
32	26	Lee Yong	South Korea	54.842	33	54.838	33	54.731	32	55.996	32	3:40.407	+21.971
-	16	Albert Demchenko	Russia	50.224	10	50.011	10	50.118	-	DQ	-	-	N/A
-	27	Andrus Paul	Estonia	DQ	-	-	-	-	-	-	-	-	N/A
