= Dmitry Ulyanov =

Dmitry Ulyanov or Dmitri Ulyanov may refer to:

- Dmitry Ilyich Ulyanov (1874–1943), Soviet politician, brother of Vladimir Lenin
- Dmitry Nikolayevich Ulyanov (born 1970), Russian footballer who had success playing in Israel
- Dmitry Ulyanov (alpine skier) (born 1983), Russian former alpine skier
