= Daisuke Yoshioka =

Japanese alpine skier (born 1980)

Personal information
- Nationality: Japanese
- Born: 6 January 1980 (age 45); Niseko, Hokkaido, Japan

Sport
- Sport: Alpine skiing
- Rank: 24
- Event: Giant Slalom

Daisuke Yoshioka (born 6 January 1980) is a Japanese alpine skier. He competed in the men's giant slalom at the 2006 Winter Olympics. He was ranked 24th in the Giant Slalom event.
