= Larry Dolan (luger) =

American luger

Personal information
- Born: July 8, 1975 (age 51) Plattsburgh, New York, United States

Sport
- Sport: Luge

Larry Dolan (born July 8, 1975) is an American former luger and coach. He competed in the men's singles event at the 1998 Winter Olympics.
