= Alpine skiing at the 2026 Winter Olympics – Women's downhill =

Women's downhill at the XXV Olympic Winter Games
- Alpine skiing
- Venue: Olimpia delle Tofane, Cortina d'Ampezzo
- Date: 8 February 2026
- Competitors: 36 from 17 nations
- Winning time: 1:36.10

Medalists
1st place, gold medalist(s)		Breezy Johnson	United States
2nd place, silver medalist(s)		Emma Aicher	Germany
3rd place, bronze medalist(s)		Sofia Goggia	Italy

Women's Downhill
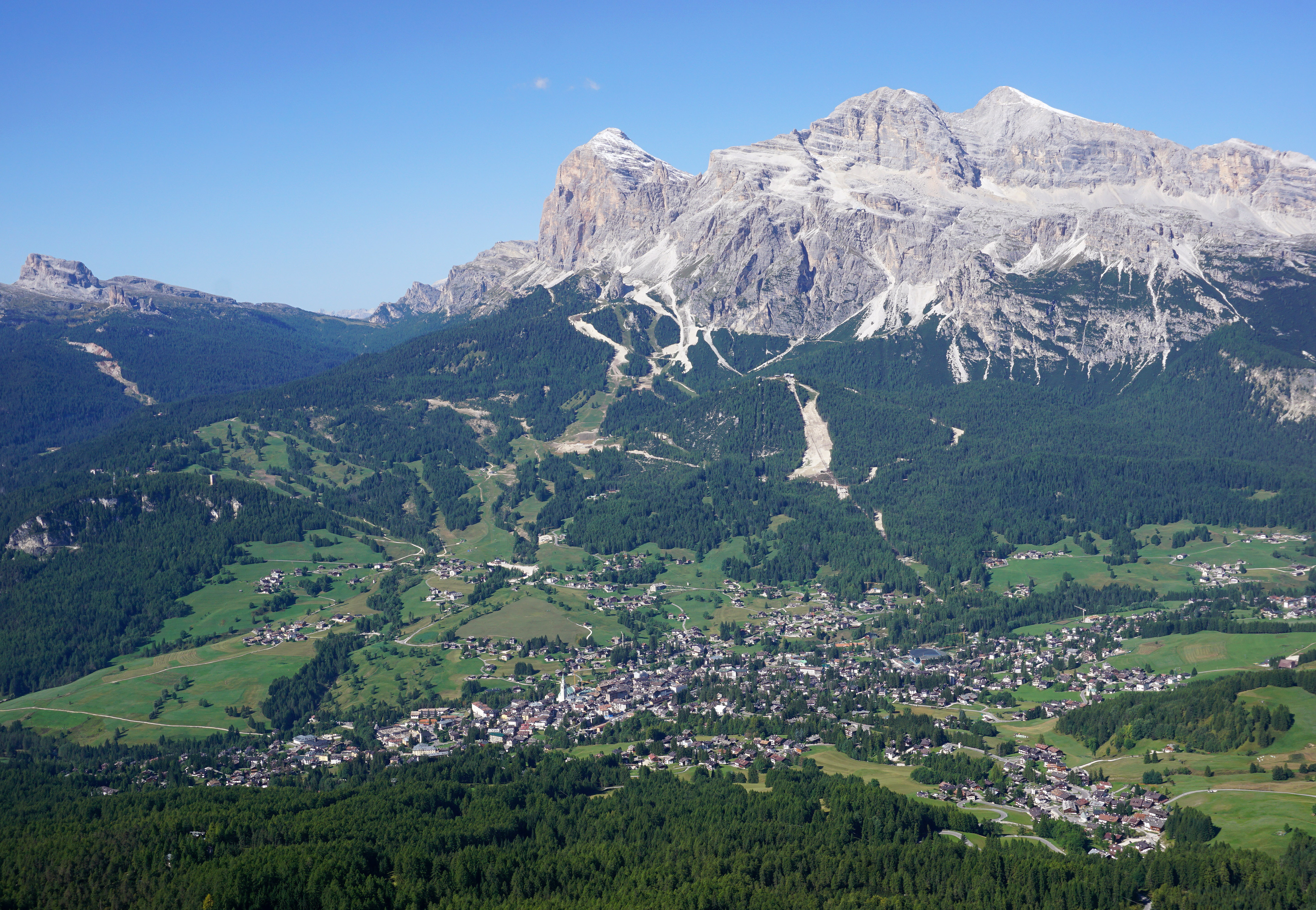
- Location: Olimpia delle Tofane
- Nearest major city: Cortina d'Ampezzo
- Vertical: 760 m (2,493 ft)
- Top elevation: 2,320 m (7,612 ft) AMSL
- Base elevation: 1,560 m (5,118 ft)
- Longest run: 2.572 km (1.60 mi)

The women's downhill competition of the 2026 Winter Olympics was held on Sunday, 8 February, at Olimpia delle Tofane in Cortina d'Ampezzo. Breezy Johnson of the United States won the race, with Emma Aicher of Germany a second and Sofia Goggia of Italy third. This was Johnson's first Olympic medal and Aicher's first individual Olympic medal.

The course was 2,572 metres (1.60 mi) in length, with a vertical drop of 760 m (2,493 ft) from a starting elevation of 2,320 m (7,612 ft) above sea level. Gold medalist Johnson's time of 96.10 seconds yielded an average speed of 96.3496 km/h (59.87 mph) and an average vertical descent rate of 7.9084 m/s (25.9 ft/s).

== Background ==
All three medalists from 2022 qualified for this race: defending champion Corinne Suter, runner-up Sofia Goggia, and bronze medalist Nadia Delago, but Delago did not participate. Prior to the Olympics on the World Cup circuit, Mikaela Shiffrin led in the overall standings, but did not enter the Olympic downhill. Lindsey Vonn was leading the downhill standings, having reached the podium in all five downhill races, with two victories. Breezy Johnson was the reigning world champion. The Olimpia delle Tofane course is a regular stop on the World Cup circuit, with women's speed events usually held in January.

== Summary ==
Starting sixth, Johnson edged early leader Ariane Rädler by more than a second. Laura Pirovano, skiing eighth, finished in a provisional podium position. Aicher, ninth out of the gate, was faster than Johnson in the top part of the descent, but finished 0.04 seconds behind. Cornelia Hütter finished provisionally third, moving Pirovano off the podium. Lindsey Vonn started thirteenth but crashed in the top part of the descent, and was airlifted to the hospital. Fifteenth starter Goggia completed the podium, more than a half-second behind Aicher.

== Results ==
The race started at 11:30 local time (UTC+1) under clear skies. The air temperature was −2.2 °C (28 °F) at the starting gate and 1.6 °C (35 °F) at the finish area; the snow condition was hard.

Rank	Bib	Name	Country	Time	Deficit
1st place, gold medalist(s)	6	Breezy Johnson	United States	1:36.10	—
2nd place, silver medalist(s)	10	Emma Aicher	Germany	1:36.14	+0.04
3rd place, bronze medalist(s)	15	Sofia Goggia	Italy	1:36.69	+0.59
4	17	Jacqueline Wiles	United States	1:36.96	+0.86
4	11	Cornelia Hütter	Austria	1:36.96	+0.86
6	8	Laura Pirovano	Italy	1:37.04	+0.94
7	9	Kajsa Vickhoff Lie	Norway	1:37.08	+0.98
8	2	Ariane Rädler	Austria	1:37.20	+1.10
9	12	Kira Weidle-Winkelmann	Germany	1:37.26	+1.16
10	3	Federica Brignone	Italy	1:37.29	+1.19
11	14	Mirjam Puchner	Austria	1:37.65	+1.55
11	7	Nicol Delago	Italy	1:37.65	+1.55
13	23	Laura Gauché	France	1:37.98	+1.88
14	16	Corinne Suter	Switzerland	1:38.01	+1.91
15	20	Ilka Štuhec	Slovenia	1:38.08	+1.98
16	19	Romane Miradoli	France	1:38.10	+2.00
17	5	Janine Schmitt	Switzerland	1:38.28	+2.18
18	4	Jasmine Flury	Switzerland	1:38.51	+2.41
19	1	Malorie Blanc	Switzerland	1:38.77	+2.67
20	22	Elvedina Muzaferija	Bosnia and Herzegovina	1:38.81	+2.71
21	24	Isabella Wright	United States	1:38.85	+2.75
22	27	Julia Pleshkova	Individual Neutral Athletes	1:39.69	+3.59
23	25	Camille Cerutti	France	1:40.41	+4.31
24	29	Jordina Caminal	Andorra	1:41.34	+5.24
25	30	Barbora Nováková	Czech Republic	1:41.89	+5.79
26	32	Cassidy Gray	Canada	1:41.99	+5.89
27	33	Matilde Schwencke	Chile	1:43.31	+7.21
28	28	Rosa Pohjolainen	Finland	1:44.08	+7.98
29	35	Alena Labaštová	Czech Republic	1:44.55	+8.45
30	34	Nicole Begué	Argentina	1:44.73	+8.63
31	31	Elisa Maria Negri	Czech Republic	1:45.48	+9.38
32	36	Anastasiya Shepilenko	Ukraine	1:47.70	+11.60
	13	Lindsey Vonn	United States	DNF	
	18	Nina Ortlieb	Austria	DNF	
	26	Cande Moreno	Andorra	DNF	
	21	Valérie Grenier	Canada	DSQ	
