= Facundo Aguirre =

Argentine skier (born 1985)

Personal information
- Born: 9 December 1985 (age 40) General Roca, Río Negro, Argentina

Sport
- Sport: Alpine skiing

Facundo Aguirre (born 9 December 1985) is an Argentine alpine skier. He competed in the men's giant slalom at the 2006 Winter Olympics.
