= Lee Gi-ro =

South Korean luger (born 1975)

Personal information
- Nationality: South Korean
- Born: 23 November 1975 (age 49)

Sport
- Sport: Luge

Lee Gi-ro (born 23 November 1975) is a South Korean luger. He competed in the men's singles event at the 1998 Winter Olympics.
