= Hsieh Hsiang-chun =

Taiwanese luger (born 1974)

Personal information
- Nationality: Taiwanese
- Born: 23 September 1974 (age 50)

Sport
- Sport: Luge

Hsieh Hsiang-chun (born 23 September 1974) is a Taiwanese luger. He competed in the men's singles event at the 1998 Winter Olympics.
