= Kim Hyeong-cheol =

South Korean alpine skier (born 1981)

Personal information
- Nationality: South Korean
- Born: 3 January 1981 (age 45)

Sport
- Sport: Alpine skiing

Kim Hyeong-cheol (born 3 January 1981) is a South Korean alpine skier. He competed in the men's giant slalom at the 2006 Winter Olympics.
