= Mario Franjić =

Bosnian bobsledder

Personal information
- Nationality: Bosnian
- Born: 23 March 1962 (age 63) Sarajevo, Yugoslavia

Sport
- Sport: Bobsleigh

Mario Franjić (born 23 March 1962) is a Bosnian bobsledder. He competed at the 1984 Winter Olympics, representing Yugoslavia, and at the 1998 Winter Olympics, representing Bosnia and Herzegovina.

During the 1998 Winter Olympics which took place in Nagano, Japan, Mario was announced the flag-bearer for the Bosnian Olympic team and carried the flag at the opening ceremony.

His sons Janko and Jelen have also both become bobsledders, representing the Netherlands.
