= Zlatan Saračević =

Bosnia and Herzegovina shot putter

Personal information
- Born: 27 July 1956 (age 69) Zenica, Bosnia and Herzegovina

Sport
- Sport: Track and field
Medal record
Representing Yugoslavia
Men's athletics
European Indoor Championships
Gold medal – first place	1980 Sindelfingen	Shot put
Bronze medal – third place	1981 Grenoble	Shot put
Universiade
Silver medal – second place	1983 Edmonton	Shot put

Zlatan Saračević (born 27 July 1956) is a retired Bosnian shot putter who represented SFR Yugoslavia and Bosnia and Herzegovina.

== Biography ==
He was born in Zenica, SR Bosnia and Herzegovina. but represented the clubs AK Sloboda Tuzla, AK Slavonija Osijek, AK Mladost Zagreb, AK Crvena Zvezda and AK Zmaj od Bosne Tuzla. He won the gold medal at the 1980 European Indoor Championships, the bronze medal at the 1981 European Indoor Championships, and the silver medal at the 1983 Summer Universiade. He also competed at the 1992 Olympic Games and the 1996 European Indoor Championships without reaching the final.

His personal best throw was 21.11 metres, achieved in June 1984 in Zagreb.

He also represented Bosnia and Herzegovina at the 1992 Summer Olympics and was the country's first ever flag bearer.

Olympic Games
Preceded by N/A	Flagbearer for Bosnia and Herzegovina; Barcelona 1992	Succeeded by Islam Đugum
