= Elvedina Muzaferija =

Bosnian alpine skier (born 1999)

Personal information
- Born: 20 August 1999 (age 26) Visoko, Bosnia and Herzegovina
- Height: 168 cm (5 ft 6 in)

Skiing career
- Country: Bosnia and Herzegovina
- Sport: Alpine skiing ♀
- Club: SK ZE-2010
- Disciplines: Downhill, super-G, combined
- World Cup debut: 3 January 2017 (age 17)

Olympics
- Teams: 3 – (2018, 2022, 2026)
- Medals: 0

World Championships
- Teams: 4 – (2017, 2021–2025)
- Medals: 0

World Cup
- Seasons: 10 – (2017–2026)
- Podiums: 0
- Overall titles: 0 – (54th in 2024)
- Discipline titles: 0 – (23rd in SG, 2024)

Elvedina Muzaferija (born 20 August 1999) is a Bosnian-Herzegovinian female alpine skier. She carried her nation's flag at the 2018 Winter Olympics opening ceremony.

== Biography ==
Muzaferija was the first woman from Bosnia and Herzegovina to appear in downhill. On 10 February 2020, she achieved her best result in European Cup in Crans-Montana, Switzerland taking the 10th place in Super-G. On 19 February 2023, in Europa Cup in Crans-Montana, Elvedina was 15th in the downhill race, and day before she was 2nd also in downhill, which is the best result of any skier from Bosnia and Herzegovina. Her previous best was achieved on 15 February 2021 as she finished 16th in World Cup, which was, at the time, the best placement of any Bosnian alpine skiers in the country's history. In World Cup in France, in February 2023, she was 15th in alpine combination race, 20th in downhill and 25th in Super-G. On 27 January 2024, Muzaferia took 14th place in the Super-G race in Cortina d'Ampezzo, Italy, a day after she took 25th place in downhill.

She was also the first alpine skier from Bosnia and Herzegovina to score points in the World Cup even though she has not received much, if any, support from Bosnian Ski association.

== World Cup results ==
=== Season standings ===
Season
Season	Age	Overall	Slalom	Giant slalom	Super-G	Downhill	Combined
2020	20	124	—	—	—	—	38
2021	21	no World Cup points					—N/a
2022	22	92	—	—	41	48	—N/a
2023	23	112	—	—	48	47	—N/a
2024	24	54	—	—	23	24	—N/a
2025	25	89	—	—	34	40	—N/a
2026	26	102	—	—	30	—	—N/a

Standings through 31 January 2026

=== Top twenty finishes ===
- 0 podiums; 8 top twenties

Season
Season	Date	Location	Discipline	Place
2022	12 December 2021	St. Moritz, Switzerland	Super-G	18th
2024	28 January 2024	Cortina d'Ampezzo, Italy	Super-G	14th
2024	16 February 2024	Crans-Montana, Switzerland	Downhill	18th
2024	17 February 2024	Crans-Montana, Switzerland	Downhill	4th
2024	18 February 2024	Crans-Montana, Switzerland	Super-G	16th
2024	2 March 2024	Kvitfjell, Norway	Super-G	9th
2024	3 March 2024	Kvitfjell, Norway	Super-G	13th
2024	23 March 2024	Saalbach, Austria	Downhill	16th

== World Championship results ==
Year
Year	Age	Slalom	Giant slalom	Super-G	Downhill	Combined	Team combined
2017	17	55	DNFQ1	—	—	—	—N/a
2021	21	—	—	38	25	16	—N/a
2023	23	—	—	25	20	15	—N/a
2025	25	—	DNF1	27	23	—N/a	22

== Olympic results ==
Year
Year	Age	Slalom	Giant slalom	Super-G	Downhill	Combined	Team combined	Team event
2018	18	DNF	44	42	31	DNF2	—N/a	—
2022	22	—	—	25	DNF	DNF2	—N/a	—
2026	26	—	32	16	20	—N/a	—	—N/a

== Other results ==
=== European Cup results ===
==== Season standings ====
Season	Age	Overall	Slalom	Giant slalom	Super-G	Downhill	Combined
2020	20	103	—	—	39	40	—
2021	21	111	—	—	31	42	—
2022	22	Did not compete at the Europa Cup					
2023	23	41	—	—	58	9	—
2024	24	29	—	—	48	7	—

==== Results per discipline ====
Discipline	EC starts	EC Top 30	EC Top 15	EC Top 5	EC Podium	Best result		
Discipline	EC starts	EC Top 30	EC Top 15	EC Top 5	EC Podium	Date	Location	Place
Slalom	0	0	0	0	0			
Giant slalom	0	0	0	0	0			
Super-G	14	7	1	0	0	16 February 2020	Crans-Montana, Switzerland	10th
Downhill	20	11	8	2	2	11 February 2024	Crans-Montana, Switzerland	1st
Combined	1	0	0	0	0	11 January 2018	Innerkrems, Austria	DNS
Total	35	18	9	2	2			

- Standings through 11 February 2024

==== Race podiums ====
- 1 win – (1 DH)
- 2 podiums – (2 DH)

Season
Season	Date	Location	Discipline	Place
2023	18 February 2023	Crans-Montana, Switzerland	Downhill	2nd
2024	11 February 2024	Crans-Montana, Switzerland	Downhill	1st

== Notes ==
Olympic Games
Preceded by Žana Novaković	Flagbearer for Bosnia and Herzegovina; PyeongChang 2018; Beijing 2022 (shared with Mirza Nikolajev)	Succeeded by Incumbent
