= Aleksandra Vasiljević =

Bosnian biathlete (born 1986)

Personal information
- Born: 10 August 1986 (age 39) Sarajevo, SR Bosnia and Herzegovina, SFR Yugoslavia

Sport

Professional information
- World Cup debut: 2 Dec 2004

World Championships
- Teams: 3 (2005–2008)

World Cup
- Seasons: 4 (2004-05–2007-08)
- Individual races: 39
- All races: 39
- Individual victories: 0
- All victories: 0
- Individual podiums: 0
- All podiums: 0

Aleksandra Vasiljević (born 10 August 1986) is a Bosnia and Herzegovina biathlete. She competed in two events at the 2006 Winter Olympics.

== Biathlon results ==
All results are sourced from the International Biathlon Union.

=== Olympic Games ===
Event	Individual	Sprint	Pursuit	Mass start	Relay
(Italy) 2006 Torino	74th	78th	—	—	—

=== World Championships ===
Event	Individual	Sprint	Pursuit	Mass start	Relay	Mixed relay
(Austria) 2005 Hochfilzen	86th	86th	—	—	—	—
(Italy) 2007 Antholz-Anterselva	78th	82nd	—	—	—	—
(Sweden) 2008 Östersund	83rd	81st	—	—	—	—

Olympic Games
Preceded by Enis Bećirbegović	Flagbearer for Bosnia and Herzegovina; Torino 2006	Succeeded by Žana Novaković
