= Bosnia and Herzegovina at the 2026 Winter Olympics =

- Flag of Bosnia and Herzegovina
- IOC code: BIH
- NOC: Olympic Committee of Bosnia and Herzegovina
- Website: www.okbih.ba (in Bosnian, Serbian, and Croatian)

in Milan and Cortina d'Ampezzo, Italy 6 February 2026 – 22 February 2026
- Competitors: 5 (2 men and 3 women) in 2 sports
- Flag bearers (opening): Marko Šljivić & Elvedina Muzaferija
- Flag bearer (closing): Volunteer
- Medals: Gold 0 Silver 0 Bronze 0 Total 0

Winter Olympics appearances (overview)
- 1994; 1998; 2002; 2006; 2010; 2014; 2018; 2022; 2026

Other related appearances
- Yugoslavia (1924–1992)

Bosnia and Herzegovina competed at the 2026 Winter Olympics in Milan and Cortina d'Ampezzo, Italy, from 6 to 22 February 2026.

Alpine skiers Marko Šljivić and Elvedina Muzaferija were the country's flagbearer during the opening ceremony. Meanwhile, a volunteer was the country's flagbearer during the closing ceremony.

== Competitors ==
The following is the list of number of competitors participating at the Games per sport/discipline.

| Sport | Men | Women | Total |
|---|---|---|---|
| Alpine skiing | 1 | 2 | 3 |
| Cross-country skiing | 1 | 1 | 2 |
| Total | 2 | 3 | 5 |

== Alpine skiing ==
Bosnia and Herzegovina qualified one male and one female alpine skier through the basic quota.

| Athlete | Event | Run 1 | | Run 2 | | Total | |
| Athlete | Event | Time | Rank | Time | Rank | Time | Rank |
|---|---|---|---|---|---|---|---|
| Marko Šljivić | Men's giant slalom | 1:22.76 | 41 | 1:17.45 | 41 | 2:40.21 | 37 |
| Marko Šljivić | Men's slalom | 1:03.05 | 25 | 59.91 | 23 | 2:02.96 | 23 |
| Esma Alić | Women's giant slalom | 1:14.48 | 57 | 1:21.35 | 51 | 2:35.83 | 51 |
| Esma Alić | Women's slalom | 55.32 | 55 | 59.99 | 45 | 1:55.31 | 46 |
| Elvedina Muzaferija | Women's downhill | —N/a | | | | 1:38.81 | 20 |
| Elvedina Muzaferija | Women's super-G | —N/a | | | | 1:25.85 | 16 |
| Elvedina Muzaferija | Women's giant slalom | 1:06.83 | 36 | 1:13.84 | 32 | 2:20.67 | 32 |

== Cross-country skiing ==
Bosnia and Herzegovina qualified one male and one male cross-country skier through the basic quota. Following the completion of the 2025–26 FIS Cross-Country World Cup in the first World Cup period (28 November – 14 December 2025), Bosnia and Herzegovina qualified a further one female athlete.

Distance

| Athlete | Event | Final | | |
| Athlete | Event | Time | Deficit | Rank |
|---|---|---|---|---|
| Strahinja Erić | Men's 10 km freestyle | 23:40.4 | +3:04.2 | 63 |
| Teodora Delipara | Women's 10 km freestyle | Did not finish | | |

Sprint

| Athlete | Event | Qualification | | Quarterfinal | | Semifinal | | Final | |
| Athlete | Event | Time | Rank | Time | Rank | Time | Rank | Time | Rank |
|---|---|---|---|---|---|---|---|---|---|
| Strahinja Erić | Men's sprint | 3:35.07 | 67 | Did not advance | | | | | |

== See also ==
- Bosnia and Herzegovina at the 2026 Winter Paralympics
