= Adam Heidt =

American luger (born 1977)

Personal information
- Born: October 11, 1977 (age 48) Huntington, New York, United States

Sport
- Sport: Luge

Adam Heidt (born October 11, 1977) is an American luger. He competed at the 1998 Winter Olympics and the 2002 Winter Olympics.
