= Tahir Bisić =

Bosnian alpine skier (born 1981)

Personal information
- Nationality: Bosnian
- Born: 29 April 1981 (age 44)

Sport
- Sport: Alpine skiing

Tahir Bisić (born 29 April 1981) is a Bosnian alpine skier. He competed in three events at the 2002 Winter Olympics. At these Games, he competed in three alpine skiing events: the giant slalom, where he placed 44th, the slalom, where he finished 29th, and the combined, where he did not finish the competition. These were the only Winter Olympics in which Tahir Bisić participated.
