= Edin Krupalija =

Bosnia and Herzegovina bobsledder

Personal information
- Nationality: Bosnian
- Born: 31 January 1977 (age 48); Sarajevo, SFR Yugoslavia

Sport
- Sport: Bobsleigh

Edin Krupalija (born 31 January 1977) is a Bosnian bobsledder. He competed in the four man event at the 1998 Winter Olympics.
