= Mojca Rataj =

Bosnian-Slovenian skier (born 1979)

Personal information
- Nationality: Bosnian-Slovenian
- Born: 9 December 1979 (age 46) Maribor, Yugoslavia

Sport
- Sport: Alpine skiing

Mojca Rataj (born 9 December 1979) is a Bosnian-Slovenian alpine skier. She competed in the women's slalom at the 2006 Winter Olympics.
