= Ilma Kazazić =

Bosnia and Herzegovina female alpine skier (born 1998)

Ilma Kazazić (born 26 May 1998) is a Bosnian alpine skier who served as flag-bearer at the 2018 Winter Paralympics Parade of Nations for Bosnia and Herzegovina at the 2018 Winter Paralympics.

She finished in 8th in Giant Slalom standing at 2019 World Para Alpine Skiing Championships.
