= Nihad Mameledžija =

Bosnian bobsledder (born 1971)

Personal information
- Nationality: Bosnia and Herzegovina
- Born: 27 February 1971 (age 54)

Sport
- Sport: Bobsleigh

Nihad Mameledžija (born 27 February 1971) is a Bosnian bobsledder. He competed in the four man event at the 1998 Winter Olympics.
