= Islam Ðugum =

Bosnian long-distance runner (born 1960)

Personal information
- Nationality: Bosnian
- Born: 1 June 1960 (age 65) Duvno, PR Bosnia and Herzegovina, FPR Yugoslavia
- Height: 177 cm (70 in)
- Weight: 66 kg (146 lb)

Sport
- Sport: Long-distance running
- Event: Marathon

Islam Ðugum (born 1 June 1960) is a Bosnian long-distance runner. From Duvno, Ðugum grew up running and playing football. In 1980, he won his first major competition, and during the 1980s, he was a member of the Yugoslavia national cross country team and set two national records while working at a shoe factory. He served in the army during the Bosnian War and continued training during this time, running 15 to 20 miles each day. He competed at the 1994 European Athletics Championships, the 1995 World Championships in Athletics, and in the men's marathon at the 1996 Summer Olympics, where he served as the Bosnian flagbearer at the opening ceremony. He has also served as a coach.

== Early life ==
Ðugum was born on 1 June 1960 in Duvno, PR Bosnia and Herzegovina, FPR Yugoslavia, and grew up in the village of Oplećani. He is Muslim and grew up on the family farm. During the 1970s, he showed promise in athletics, winning many elementary school competitions, and he also was a footballer, playing in the junior ranks with FK Budućnost Banovići along with his two brothers, Šaban and Ahmed. He attended high school in Duvno before moving to Sarajevo to study. He attended the University of Sarajevo and enrolled at the Faculty of Science as a chemistry major, but later dropped out in 1980.

Ðugum served in the Yugoslav People's Army as a tank driver in Karlovac. He competed in athletics while in the army and won his first major victory in April 1980, at a tournament in Karlovac. When he went to Sarajevo to study, he joined the club AK Sarajevo under coach Lazar Ćirović. He competed in many disciplines and impressed Ćirović, who said that "This little guy is going to do something". He participated in the 400 metres, 800 metres, in middle-distance and long-distance running, as well as cross country running. He competed for the Yugoslavia national cross country team for three and a half years and won the 1987 Kumrovec Marathon. Ðugum set the national record in the 15K run and the half marathon, working at a shoe factory in Sarajevo during this time. He married Sabina Besirovic in 1988 and moved in with her parents, who lived in the hills of Vratnik, Sarajevo.

== Bosnian War and career ==
Ðugum continued training regularly; his mother-in-law said of him that "According to Islam, there is no bad weather for running. Rain snow, mud – it doesn't matter to him". At the start of the Bosnian War in 1992, he was drafted to serve in the army as an infantryman. At the time, his wife was pregnant, and the family endured as Serb soldiers bombed the city on a daily basis. The family had purchased a dairy cow shortly before the war, keeping it underground, and it provided milk, butter and cheese and kept the family alive. Although they purchased the cow for $700, they rejected offers of over $10,000 for it during the war. When at home, Ðugum had to crawl past windows to avoid snipers; once he forgot to and a bullet narrowly missed him. Up to 17 people from the village huddled in the family's cellar, which was 10 square feet, for several days at a time amidst the bombing of the city. In July 1992, his wife gave birth to their son, Vedad.

Ðugum continued running each day between 15 and 20 miles, telling Trcanje.net that "There was nothing to eat, nothing to drink, people were shooting and dying, and I trained". At times, he was used as a messenger in the army, "running from unit to unit along the front lines", something he welcomed as providing "more chances to run". He told the Sun Sentinel that it was "Difficult to train here. It was raining grenades. A lot of people thought I was crazy, but running kept me sane". Runner's World noted that "the people who saw him running on the streets of the devastated city thought he was crazy, but little by little they began to get used to that familiar figure. Even though he often had to change his routes to avoid snipers. He finished his work for the army and off he went, through empty streets and often desolate landscapes".

In 1994, Ðugum managed to escape Bosnia with the national athletics coach to participate at the 1994 European Athletics Championships in Helsinki, Finland, where he competed in the marathon. There, he finished 60th, last among finishers, with a time of 2:29.19. At the Championships, he met Valerio Pichoni, a journalist for Italian newspaper La Gazzetta dello Sport, who asked what Ðugum's "greatest sporting wish was". Ðugum responded that he wanted to compete at the New York City Marathon. Pichoni arranged for Ðugum to compete there and he finished 88th among 40,000 competitors. Afterwards, he returned to Bosnia, although he was nearly killed when a bus he was riding on overturned on a mountain road. He later recalled being asked why he wanted to return to Bosnia amidst the war: "They would say: 'There is war, there's shooting, why are you going back?' But by what right could I leave my family? I returned to my [army] unit and I returned to our reality in Sarajevo", he said.

Ðugum escaped Bosnia again in 1995 to compete at the 1995 World Championships in Athletics in the marathon. He placed 53rd, last among finishers, with a time of 2:38.37. That same year, he participated at the Rome Marathon, finishing with a career best time of 2:24, and organized the Vivicittà International City Athletic Race in Sarajevo, which had 100 participants in its first year. He recalled that at the event he organized, "The City Hall was on fire, but I ran. Zetra [Olympic Hall] was on fire, but I ran". After the end of the war, in February 1996, he was able to train better and eat better, recalling that "For four years the food had been terrible: only beans, pasta, and rice". That year, he was selected to represent Bosnia and Herzegovina at the 1996 Summer Olympics in Atlanta, U.S. He was the only competitor for Bosnia who had stayed training in the country during the war, and he was chosen as their flagbearer at the opening Olympic ceremony. At the Olympics, he placed 107th out of 111 finishers with a time of 2:47.38.

In 1997, Medina Šehić made the film Olimpijci (Olympians) based on Ðugum's career, which won first place at the Portorož Festival. He continued running after the Olympics, including at the Berlin Marathon in 1997. By 2019, he had run in over 90 marathons, finishing with a time below 3 hours in 82 of them. He competed at several ultramarathons and set the national record in the 50K run. His longest ultramarathon was 90 kilometres. Ðugum has also served as a coach at the club AK Bosna in Sarajevo for many years. He ran with United Nations Secretary-General Ban Ki-moon in 2012, prior to the 2012 Summer Olympics, and in 2019, he handed over the Olympic flame at the 2019 European Youth Olympic Winter Festival.

Olympic Games
Preceded by Zlatan Saračević	Flagbearer for Bosnia and Herzegovina; Atlanta 1996	Succeeded by Elvir Krehmić
