= Dave Wesselink =

Dutch bobsledder (born 1999)

Personal information
- Full name: David Wesselink
- Born: 1 October 1999 (age 26) Alkmaar, Netherlands
- Height: 193 cm (6 ft 4 in)
- Weight: 106 kg (234 lb)

Sport
- Country: Netherlands
- Sport: Bobsleigh
- Events: Two-man, Four-man
- Turned pro: 2022

David Wesselink (born 1 October 1999) is a Dutch bobsledder and lawyer. He was selected to represent the Netherlands at the 2026 Winter Olympics.

== Career ==
Prior to bobsleeding, Wesselink competed in hurdling, which included participating in the Dutch Indoor Championships.

Wesselink began competing professionally in bobsleigh in 2022 in the European Championship. In 2024, he made his first appearance at the Bobsleigh World Championships, finishing 19th in two-man and 16th in four-man. In 2025, he began competing full-time in the IBSF World Cup.

Wesselink was selected to represent the Netherlands at the 2026 Winter Olympics. He finished tied for 10th in the two-man event, equaling the best result ever for a Dutch bobsledder at the Olympics.

== Personal life ==
Outside of sport, Wesselink is a lawyer, specializing in corporate law. He is a graduate of Leiden University.

== Bobsleigh results ==
All results are sourced from the International Bobsleigh and Skeleton Federation (IBSF).

=== Olympic Games ===
Event	Two-man	Four-man
(Italy) 2026 Milano Cortina	10th	13th

=== World Championships ===
Event	Two-man	Four-man
(Germany) 2024 Winterberg	19th	16th
