= Marko Schafferer =

Bosnian alpine skier (born 1984)

Personal information
- Nationality: Bosnian
- Born: 4 May 1984 (age 41) Innsbruck, Austria

Sport
- Sport: Alpine skiing

Marko Schafferer (born 4 May 1984) is a Bosnian, Austrian-born alpine skier. He competed in two events at the 2006 Winter Olympics.
