= Dmitry Ulyanov (alpine skier) =

Russian alpine skier (born 1983)

Dmitry Sergeevich Ulyanov (Russian: Дмитрий Сергеевич Ульянов; born 12 January 1983 in Yuzhno-Sakhalinsk) is a Russian retired alpine skier who competed in the 2006 Winter Olympics.
