= Verona Marjanović =

Bosnian luger (born 1974)

Personal information
- Full name: Verona Marjanović
- Nationality: Bosnian
- Born: 1 February 1974 (age 51); Sarajevo, SR Bosnia and Herzegovina, Yugoslavia

Sport
- Sport: Luge

Verona Marjanović (born 1 February 1974) is a Bosnian luger. In the women's singles event at the 1994 Winter Olympics, she placed 23rd.

== Biography ==
Verona Marjanović was born on 1 February 1974 in Sarajevo, Yugoslavia, to a Serb father and Croat mother; Verona had a sister. She started practicing the luge in 1989 after her friend in school who practiced in the sport told her to try it. For a three year period, she could not train in the sport. While at Sarajevo, she stated that each person had only received 300 grams (11 ounces) of food rations every day.

Her coach, Senad Omanović, and her sister urged Verona to leave Sarajevo to prepare for the Olympic Games. She left the city in February 1993 only bringing clothes, running through a neutral zone at Sarajevo International Airport while hearing bullets being fired. She had planned to train in Germany for a hundred days and return home, though her coach refused. She then trained in multiple countries in the lead-up to the 1994 Winter Olympics, travelling through Germany, Austria, Italy, and Croatia, as their respective National Olympic Committees had given support for Bosnian athletes.

For three months before the Winter Games, she competed in multiple competitions though she stated that she could not remember her results as she placed low. It was only when she travelled to Frankfurt to go to Oslo by boat, that she could call her relatives after a year. Marjanović found out her parents were still alive and their house was still undamaged. The day later, she saw television coverage of the Markale massacres and worried that her relatives were killed. She said that she felt guilty for competing as her relatives were at risk of getting killed. Upon arriving at the Games she stated:

I'm ashamed to be here, I left all these people and they are getting killed, and I'm here just to do sports. If you live in Sarajevo, you don't know what it is to be free. If you're not in Sarajevo, you don't have to worry about food, you don't have to worry about getting killed while you sleep, you don't have to worry about drinking a cup of coffee in a cafe.

Although she felt guilty, she stated "I will try," as she felt proud to be representing her country. On a Friday before the Olympic Games, she crashed during a practice run though was not injured. Between 15 and 16 February, she competed in the women's singles event in the luge. She recorded a time of 50.586 on her first run, initially placing her 21st. She stated her run was "OK". Her subsequent runs recorded times of 51.707, 51.365, and 51.121. She placed 23rd out of the 25 lugers that competed.

In May of the same year, she became a student in microbiology and genetics. She went to Lake Placid, New York, after the Games to train for the 1998 Winter Olympics, though she did not compete.
