= Bosnia and Herzegovina at the 2022 Winter Olympics =

- Flag of Bosnia and Herzegovina
- IOC code: BIH
- NOC: Olympic Committee of Bosnia and Herzegovina
- Website: www.okbih.ba (in Bosnian, Serbian, and Croatian)

in Beijing, China 4–20 February 2022
- Competitors: 6 (3 men and 3 women) in 3 sports
- Flag bearers (opening): Elvedina Muzaferija; Mirza Nikolajev
- Flag bearer (closing): Strahinja Erić
- Medals: Gold 0 Silver 0 Bronze 0 Total 0

Winter Olympics appearances (overview)
- 1994; 1998; 2002; 2006; 2010; 2014; 2018; 2022; 2026

Other related appearances
- Yugoslavia (1924–1992)

Bosnia and Herzegovina competed at the 2022 Winter Olympics in Beijing, China, from 4 to 20 February 2022.

The Bosnia and Herzegovina team consisted of six athletes (three per gender) competing in three sports. Elvedina Muzaferija and Mirza Nikolajev were the country's flagbearer during the opening ceremony. Alpine skier Strahinja Erić was the flagbearer during the closing ceremony.

== Competitors ==
The following is the list of number of competitors who participated at the Games per sport/discipline.

Sport	Men	Women	Total
Alpine skiing	1	2	3
Cross-country skiing	1	1	2
Luge	1	0	1
Total	3	3	6

== Alpine skiing ==
By meeting the basic qualification standards, Bosnia and Herzegovina qualified one male and one female alpine skier, and received one more female quota during reallocation.

Athlete	Event	Run 1		Run 2		Total	
Athlete	Event	Time	Rank	Time	Rank	Time	Rank
Emir Lokmić	Men's giant slalom	1:08.00	29	DNF			
Emir Lokmić	Men's slalom	58.86	35	53.94	27	1:52.80	27
Esma Alić	Women's giant slalom	DSQ		Did not advance			
Esma Alić	Women's slalom	1:01.72	50	1:02.93	45	2:04.65	45
Elvedina Muzaferija	Women's combined	1:35.89	20	DNF			
Elvedina Muzaferija	Women's downhill	—N/a				DNF	
Elvedina Muzaferija	Women's super-G	—N/a				1:15.79	25

== Cross-country skiing ==
By meeting the basic qualification standards Bosnia and Herzegovina qualified one male and one female cross-country skier.

Due to high winds and adverse weather conditions, the men's 50 km freestyle competition on 19 February was shortened to 30 km.

Distance

Athlete	Event	Time	Deficit	Rank
Strahinja Erić	Men's 15 km classical	48:38.3	+10:43.5	87
Strahinja Erić	Men's 50 km freestyle	1:21:07.6	+9:34.9	52
Sanja Kusmuk	Women's 30 km freestyle	DNS		

Sprint

Athlete	Event	Qualification		Quarterfinal		Semifinal		Final	
Athlete	Event	Time	Rank	Time	Rank	Time	Rank	Time	Rank
Strahinja Erić	Men's sprint	3:03.05	59	Did not advance					
Sanja Kusmuk	Women's sprint	4:27.99	90	Did not advance					

== Luge ==
Based on the results during the 2021–22 Luge World Cup season, Bosnia and Herzegovina qualified 1 sled in the men's singles.

Athlete	Event	Run 1		Run 2		Run 3		Run 4		Total	
Athlete	Event	Time	Rank	Time	Rank	Time	Rank	Time	Rank	Time	Rank
Mirza Nikolajev	Men's singles	1:01.667	33	1:02.507	34	1:01.175	33	Did not advance		3:05.349	34
