= Arijana Boras =

Bosnian alpine skier (born 1976)

Personal information
- Nationality: Bosnian
- Born: 15 December 1976 (age 48); Konjic, SFR Yugoslavia

Sport
- Sport: Alpine skiing

Arijana Boras (born 15 December 1976) is a Bosnian alpine skier. She competed at the 1992 Winter Olympics, representing Yugoslavia, and the 1994 Winter Olympics and the 1998 Winter Olympics, representing Bosnia and Herzegovina. She lives in Bormio. She cited fellow Olympians Deborah Compagnoni and Alberto Tomba as helping her to continue her ski training in Italy.
