= Tanja Karišik-Košarac =

Bosnian biathlete and cross-country skier (born 1991)

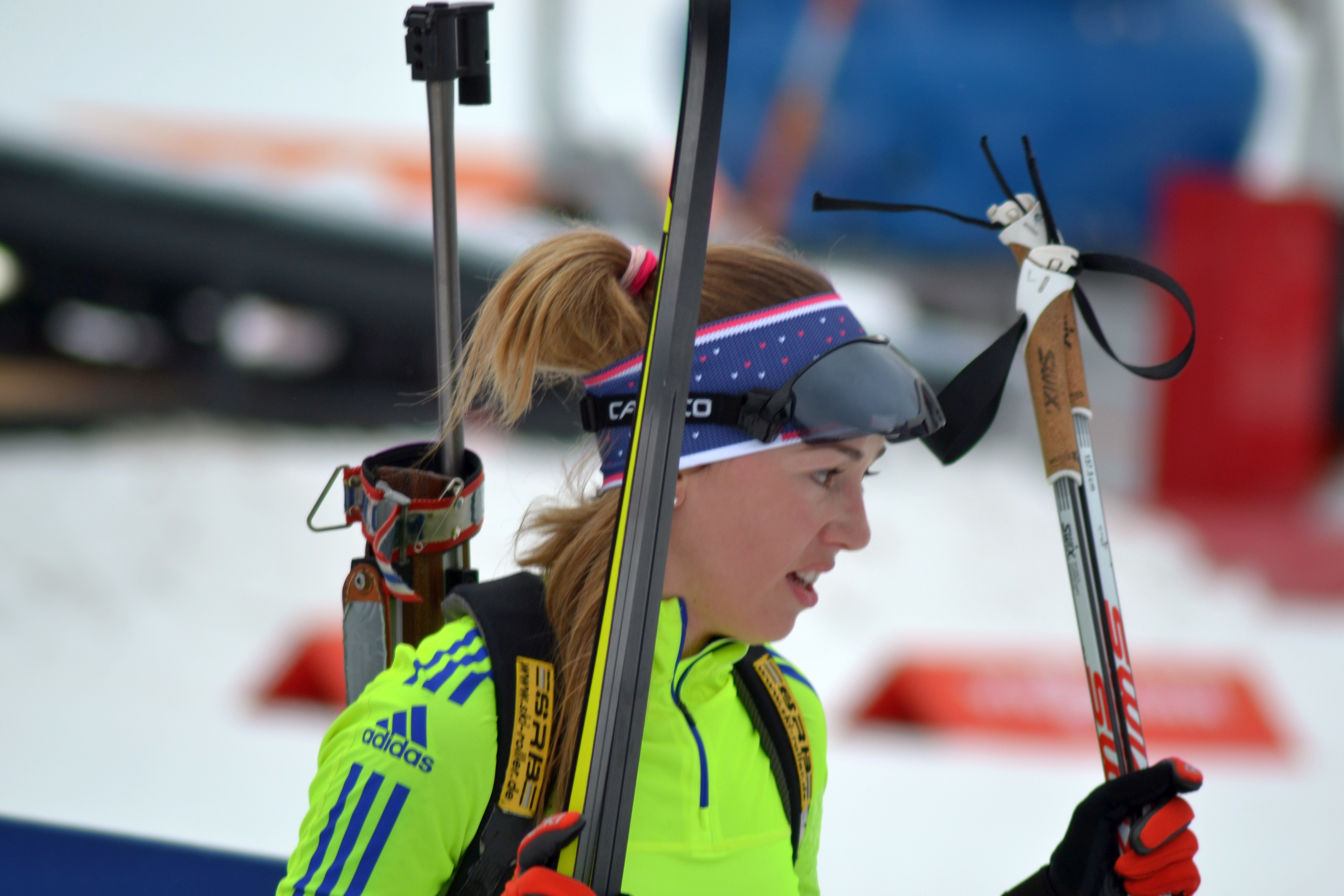
Karišik at ECH 2017

Tanja Karišik-Košarac (Bosnian pronunciation: [tǎɲa karǐʃik, tâ-]; née Karišik; born July 23, 1991) is a cross-country skier and biathlete from Bosnia and Herzegovina who has competed since 2009. She finished 72nd in the 10 km event at the 2010 Winter Olympics in Vancouver, and 65th in the 10 km event at the 2018 Winter Olympics in Pyeongchang.

Her lone career finish was at a 5 km event in Bosnia and Herzegovina in 2009.

Her husband is Nemanja Košarac, another Bosnian biathlete.
