= Ismar Biogradlić =

Bosnian luger (born 1974)

Personal information
- Nationality: Bosniak
- Born: 5 April 1974 (age 51)

Sport
- Country: Yugoslavia (1992); Bosnia and Herzegovina (1998)
- Sport: Luge

Ismar Biogradlić (born 5 April 1974) is a Bosnian-Herzegovinian luger. He competed for Yugoslavia at the 1992 Winter Olympics and for Bosnia and Herzegovina at the 1998 Winter Olympics.
