= Žana Novaković =

Bosnian alpine skier (born 1985)

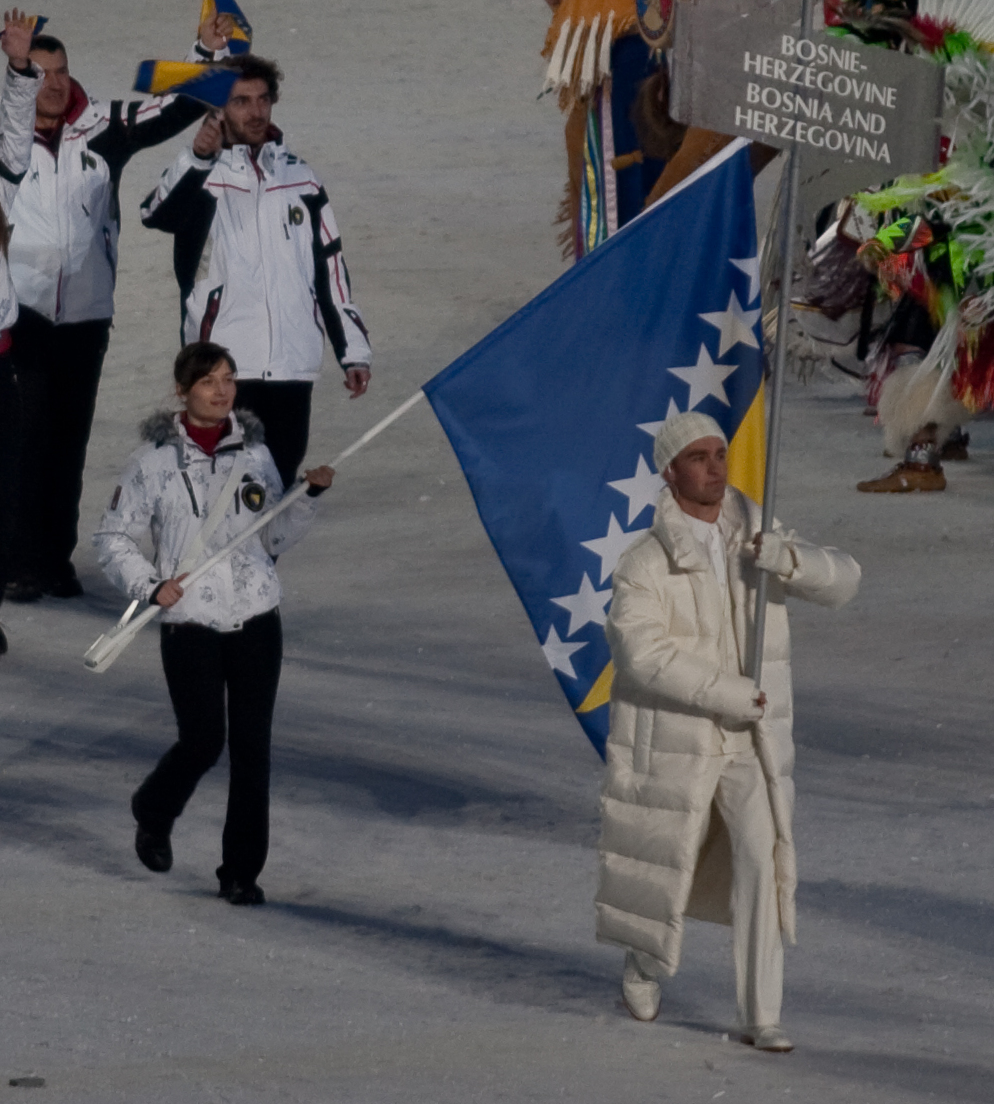
- Žana Novaković as a flag bearer at 2010 Winter Olympics opening

Personal information
- Born: 24 June 1985 (age 41) Sarajevo, SR Bosnia and Herzegovina, SFR Yugoslavia
- Height: 164 cm (5 ft 5 in)

Skiing career
- Sport: Alpine skiing ♀
- Disciplines: Slalom, giant slalom
- World Cup debut: 12 January 2008 (age 22)

Olympics
- Teams: 2 – (2010–2014)

World Championships
- Teams: 7 – (2005–2017)

World Cup
- Seasons: 6 – (2008–2010, 2012–2014)

Žana Novaković (Serbian Cyrillic: Жана Новаковић; born June 24, 1985) is a female alpine skier from Bosnia and Herzegovina who competed for Bosnia and Herzegovina at the 2010 Winter Olympics. She carried her nation's flag at the 2010 Winter Olympics opening ceremony. She also competed at FIS Alpine World Ski Championships 2011.

== World Cup results ==
=== Results per discipline ===
Discipline	WC starts	WC Top 30	WC Top 15	WC Top 5	WC Podium	Best result		
Discipline	WC starts	WC Top 30	WC Top 15	WC Top 5	WC Podium	Date	Location	Place
Slalom	9	0	0	0	0	29 December 2009	Lienz, Austria	47th
Giant slalom	7	0	0	0	0	15 December 2013	St. Moritz, Switzerland	48th
Super-G	0	0	0	0	0			
Downhill	0	0	0	0	0			
Combined	0	0	0	0	0			
Total	16	0	0	0	0			

== World Championship results ==
Year
Year	Age	Slalom	Giant; Slalom	Super G	Downhill	Combined	Team Event
2005	19	28	—	—	—	—	—
2007	21	39	DNF2	—	—	—	—
2009	23	DNF1	DSQ1	—	—	—	—
2011	25	DNF1	42	—	—	—	—
2013	27	DNF1	44	—	—	—	—
2015	29	DNF1	53	—	—	—	—
2017	31	DNFQ2	53	—	—	—	—

== Olympic results ==
Year
Year	Age	Slalom	Giant; Slalom	Super G	Downhill	Combined
2010	24	40	41	—	—	—
2014	28	26	37	—	—	—

Olympic Games
Preceded by Aleksandra Vasiljević	Flagbearer for Bosnia and Herzegovina; Vancouver 2010; Sochi 2014	Succeeded by Elvedina Muzaferija
