= Zoran Sokolović (bobsleigh) =

Bosnian bobsledder

Personal information
- Nationality: Bosnian
- Born: 2 June 1965 (age 61) Sarajevo, Yugoslavia

Sport
- Sport: Bobsleigh

Zoran Sokolović (born 2 June 1965) is a Bosnian bobsledder. He competed at the 1984 Winter Olympics, representing Yugoslavia, and at the 1994 Winter Olympics and the 1998 Winter Olympics, representing Bosnia and Herzegovina.
