= Bekim Babić =

Bosnia and Herzegovina cross-country skier (born 1975)

Personal information
- Nationality: Bosnian
- Born: 1 January 1975 (age 50); Sarajevo, SFR Yugoslavia

Sport
- Sport: Cross-country skiing

Bekim Babić (born 1 January 1975) is a Bosnia and Herzegovina cross-country skier. He competed at the 1992 Winter Olympics and the 1994 Winter Olympics.
