= Mladen Plakalović =

Bosnian cross-country skier (born 1991)

Mladen Plakalović (born 25 September 1991 in Sarajevo) is a cross-country skier from Bosnia and Herzegovina who has competed since 2007. He finished 78th in the 15 km event at the 2010 Winter Olympics in Vancouver.

Plakalović finished 115th in the individual sprint event at the FIS Nordic World Ski Championships 2009 in Liberec.

His lone win was in 15 km event at Bosnia and Herzegovina in 2009.
