= Bosnia and Herzegovina at the 2018 Winter Paralympics =

Bosnia and Herzegovina sent a competitor to the 2018 Winter Paralympics in Pyeongchang, South Korea. The 19-year-old para-alpine skier Ilma Kazazic was their sole competitor.

== Team ==
Bosnia and Herzegovina was represented by only one person at the 2018 Winter Paralympics. Ilma Kazazic competes in slalom and giant slalom. Three people will accompany Kazazic. The total delegation is four people. The other people are team coach Leon Svetlin, doctor Mirsad Muftić, and chef-de-mission Osman Hadžić. The team departed for South Korea in late February. They arrived in the village on 6 March.

The table below contains the list of members of people (called "Team Bosnia and Herzegovina") that participated in the 2018 Games.

Team Bosnia and Herzegovina
Name	Sport	Gender	Classification	Events	ref
Ilma Kazazic	para-alpine skiing	female	LW3	slalom and giant slalom	

== History ==
The country has never won a medal at the Winter Paralympics. Before 2018, only three people represented Bosnia and Herzegovina at the Winter Paralympics. They were Nijaz Memic in 2010 and Ilma Kazazic and Senad Turkovic. All three are para-alpine skiers.

== Para-alpine skiing ==
Ilma Kazazic represented Bosnia and Herzegovina. She competed in the slalom and giant slalom races. Her coach was Leon Svetlin.
