= Enis Bećirbegović =

Bosnian alpine skier (born 1976)

Personal information
- Nationality: Bosniak
- Born: 2 August 1976 (age 50) Sarajevo, SFR Yugoslavia

Sport
- Sport: Alpine skiing

Enis Bećirbegović (born 2 August 1976) is a Bosnian-Herzegovinian alpine skier. He competed at the 1992 Winter Olympics, representing Yugoslavia, and at the 1994, 1998 and the 2002 Winter Olympics, representing Bosnia and Herzegovina.
