= January 2012 in sports =

<<	January 2012					>>
Su	Mo	Tu	We	Th	Fr	Sa
1	2	3	4	5	6	7
8	9	10	11	12	13	14
15	16	17	18	19	20	21
22	23	24	25	26	27	28
29	30	31
Sports

This list shows notable sports-related deaths, events, and notable outcomes that occurred in January of 2012.

== Current sporting seasons ==
=== American football 2011 ===
- National Football League
- NCAA Division I FBS
- NCAA Division I FCS

=== Auto racing 2012 ===
- World Rally Championship

=== Basketball 2012 ===
- NBA
- NCAA Division I men
- NCAA Division I women
- Euroleague
- EuroLeague Women
- Eurocup
- EuroChallenge
- ASEAN Basketball League
- Australia
- France
- Germany
- Greece
- Israel
- Italy
- Philippines
  - Philippine Cup
- Russia
- Spain
- Turkey

=== Cricket 2012 ===
- Australia:
  - Sheffield Shield
  - Ryobi One-Day Cup

=== Football (soccer) 2012 ===
National teams competitions

- 2014 FIFA World Cup qualification
- UEFA Women's Euro 2013 qualifying

International clubs competitions

- UEFA (Europe) Champions League
- UEFA Europa League
- UEFA Women's Champions League
- Copa Libertadores (South America)
- CONCACAF (North & Central America) Champions League
- OFC (Oceania) Champions League

Domestic (national) competitions

- Australia
- England
- France
- Germany
- Iran
- Italy
- Portugal
- Russia
- Scotland
- Spain

=== Ice hockey 2012 ===
- National Hockey League
- Kontinental Hockey League
- Czech Extraliga
- Elitserien
- Canadian Hockey League:
  - OHL, QMJHL, WHL
- NCAA Division I men
- NCAA Division I women

=== Rugby union 2012 ===
- Heineken Cup
- Amlin Challenge Cup
- Aviva Premiership
- RaboDirect Pro12
- LV= Cup
- Top 14
- Sevens World Series

=== Snooker 2012 ===
- Players Tour Championship

=== Tennis 2012 ===
- ATP World Tour
- WTA Tour

=== Volleyball 2012 ===
International clubs competitions

- Men's CEV Champions League
- Women's CEV Champions League

=== Winter sports ===
- Alpine Skiing World Cup
- Biathlon World Cup
- Bobsleigh World Cup
- Cross-Country Skiing World Cup
- Freestyle Skiing World Cup
- Luge World Cup
- Nordic Combined World Cup
- Short Track Speed Skating World Cup
- Skeleton World Cup
- Ski Jumping World Cup
- Snowboard World Cup
- Speed Skating World Cup

== Days of the month ==
=== January 31, 2012 (Tuesday) ===
==== Football (soccer) ====
- Africa Cup of Nations in Equatorial Guinea and Gabon (teams in **bold** advance to the quarterfinals):
  - Group C:
    - **Gabon** 1–0 **Tunisia**
    - Niger 0–1 Morocco
      - Standings: Gabon 9 points, Tunisia 6, Morocco 3, Niger 0.
- Copa Libertadores First Stage, second leg (teams in **bold** advance to the Second stage):
  - Sport Huancayo (Peru) 1–1 (Argentina) **Arsenal**. Arsenal win 4–1 on points.
  - **Libertad** (Paraguay) 4–1 (Ecuador) El Nacional. 3–3 on points; Libertad win 4–2 on aggregate.

==== Futsal ====
- European Men's Championship in Croatia:
  - Group A in Split: Croatia 2–1 Romania
  - Group B in Zagreb: Spain 4–2 Slovenia

==== Handball ====
- Asian Men's Championship in Jeddah, Saudi Arabia:
  - Group A: Japan 25–27 Iran
  - Group B: Saudi Arabia 24–24 Qatar

=== January 30, 2012 (Monday) ===
==== Cricket ====
- Zimbabwe in New Zealand:
  - Only Test in Napier:

==== Football (soccer) ====
- Africa Cup of Nations in Equatorial Guinea and Gabon (teams in **bold** advance to the quarterfinals):
  - Group B:
    - **Sudan** 2–1 Burkina Faso
    - **Ivory Coast** 2–0 Angola
      - Standings: Côte d'Ivoire 9 points, Sudan, Angola 4, Burkina Faso 0.

==== Handball ====
- Asian Men's Championship in Jeddah, Saudi Arabia:
  - Group A:
    - Iran 25–17 Jordan
    - Kuwait 26–27 South Korea
  - Group B:
    - Qatar 28–21 United Arab Emirates
    - Uzbekistan 15–52 Bahrain

=== January 29, 2012 (Sunday) ===
==== Alpine skiing ====
- Men's World Cup in Garmisch, Germany: Super Giant slalom
- Women's World Cup in St. Moritz, Switzerland: Downhill

==== American football ====
- NFL playoffs:
  - Pro Bowl in Honolulu: AFC 59, NFC 41

==== Basketball ====
- PBA Philippine Cup finals in Quezon City, Philippines:
  - Game 6: Talk 'N Text Tropang Texters 110, Powerade Tigers 101. **Talk 'N Text win series 4–1.**
    - Talk 'N Text win their fourth league title in three years and complete the first successful PBA Philippine Cup title defense since 1985.

==== Cricket ====
- Pakistan vs England in UAE:
  - 2nd Test in Abu Dhabi

==== Figure skating ====
- United States Championships in San Jose, California

==== Football (soccer) ====
- Africa Cup of Nations in Equatorial Guinea and Gabon (teams in **bold** advance to the quarterfinals):
  - Group A:
    - **Equatorial Guinea** 0–1 **Zambia**
    - Libya 2–1 Senegal
      - Standings: Zambia 7 points, Equatorial Guinea 6, Libya 4, Senegal 0.
- CONCACAF Women's Olympic Qualifying Tournament in Vancouver, Canada:
  - Final: United States 4–0 Canada
    - United States and Canada qualify for the Olympic Tournament.

==== Freestyle skiing ====
- World Cup in Calgary, Alberta, Canada: Aerials

==== Handball ====
- European Men's Championship in Belgrade, Serbia:
  - Bronze medal game: (bronze) **Croatia** 31–27 Spain
  - Final: (silver) Serbia 19–21 (gold) **Denmark**
    - Denmark win the title for the second time, and qualify for the Olympic Tournament.
- Asian Men's Championship in Jeddah, Saudi Arabia:
  - Group A: Kuwait 27–30 Japan
  - Group B: Uzbekistan 14–47 Saudi Arabia

==== Luge ====
- World Cup 7 in St. Moritz, Switzerland

==== Nordic combined ====
- World Cup in Zakopane, Poland:
  - HS 130 / Penalty Race (TBC)

==== Short track speed skating ====
- European Championships in Mladá Boleslav, Czech Republic:

==== Ski jumping ====
- Men's World Cup in Sapporo, Japan:
  - HS 134:

==== Speed skating ====
- World Sprint Championships in Calgary, Canada

==== Tennis ====
- Grand Slams:
  - Australian Open in Melbourne, Australia, day 14:
    - Men's singles – final: Novak Djokovic (SRB) [1] vs. Rafael Nadal (ESP) [2]

==== Water polo ====
- Men's European Championship in Eindhoven, Netherlands:
  - Bronze medal match: Italy 9–12 (bronze) **Hungary**
  - Final: (gold) **Serbia** 9–8 (silver) Montenegro
    - Serbia win the title for the fifth time.

=== January 28, 2012 (Saturday) ===
==== Alpine skiing ====
- Men's World Cup in Garmisch, Germany: Downhill
- Women's World Cup in St. Moritz, Switzerland: Super combined

==== American football ====
- NCAA bowl games:
  - Senior Bowl in Mobile, Alabama: North 23, South 13

==== Cricket ====
- India in Australia:
  - 4th Test in Adelaide

==== Figure skating ====
- European Championships in Sheffield, Great Britain:
  - Men:
  - Ladies:
- United States Championships in San Jose, California

==== Football (soccer) ====
- Africa Cup of Nations in Equatorial Guinea and Gabon:
  - Group D in Franceville:
    - Botswana 1–6 Guinea
    - Ghana 2–1 Mali

==== Freestyle skiing ====
- World Cup in Calgary, Alberta, Canada: Moguls

==== Handball ====
- Asian Men's Championship in Jeddah, Saudi Arabia:
  - Group A:
    - Japan 35–22 Jordan
    - South Korea 26–21 Iran
  - Group B:
    - Bahrain 26–27 Qatar
    - Saudi Arabia 26–19 United Arab Emirates

==== Luge ====
- World Cup 7 in St. Moritz, Switzerland

==== Mixed martial arts ====
- UFC on Fox: Evans vs. Davis in Chicago, United States:
  - Middleweight bout: **Chris Weidman** (USA) def. Demian Maia (BRA) via unanimous decision (29–28, 29–28, 30–27)
  - Middleweight bout: **Chael Sonnen** (USA) def. Michael Bisping (ENG) via unanimous decision (30–27, 29–28, 29–28)
  - Light Heavyweight bout: **Rashad Evans** (USA) def. Phil Davis (USA) via unanimous decision (50–45, 50–45, 50–45)

==== Nordic combined ====
- World Cup in Zakopane, Poland:
  - HS 134 / 10 km

==== Ski jumping ====
- Men's World Cup in Sapporo, Japan:
  - HS 134 (night)

==== Snowboarding ====
- World Cup in Sudenfeld, Germany: Giant slalom

==== Speed skating ====
- World Sprint Championships in Calgary, Canada

==== Tennis ====
- Grand Slams:
  - Australian Open in Melbourne, Australia, day 13:
    - Women's singles – final: Victoria Azarenka (BLR) [3] vs. Maria Sharapova (RUS) [4]
    - Men's doubles – final: Bob Bryan (USA) / Mike Bryan (USA) [1] vs. Leander Paes (IND) / Radek Štěpánek (CZE)
    - Girls' singles – final: Taylor Townsend (USA) [14] vs. Yulia Putintseva (RUS) [4]
    - Boys' singles – final: Luke Saville (AUS) [1] vs. Filip Peliwo (CAN)
    - Wheelchair women's singles final: Esther Vergeer (NED) [1] vs. Aniek Van Koot (NED) [2]
    - Wheelchair men's singles final: Maikel Scheffers (NED) [1] vs. Nicolas Peifer (FRA)
    - Wheelchair quad singles: David Wagner (USA) [1] vs. Peter Norfolk (GBR) [2]

==== Water polo ====
- Women's European Championship in Eindhoven, Netherlands:
  - Bronze medal match: (bronze) **Hungary** 9–8 Russia
  - Final: (gold) **Italy** 13–10 (silver) Greece
    - Italy win the title for the fifth time

=== January 27, 2012 (Friday) ===
==== Figure skating ====
- European Championships in Sheffield, Great Britain:
  - Ice dancing: (gold) Nathalie Péchalat / Fabian Bourzat (FRA) 164.18 (silver) Ekaterina Bobrova / Dmitri Soloviev (RUS) 160.23 (bronze) Elena Ilinykh / Nikita Katsalapov (RUS) 153.12
    - Péchalat and Bourzat win the title for the second successive time.

==== Football (soccer) ====
- Africa Cup of Nations in Equatorial Guinea and Gabon:
  - Group C in Libreville:
    - Niger 1–2 Tunisia
    - Gabon 3–2 Morocco
- CONCACAF Women's Olympic Qualifying Tournament in Vancouver, Canada:
  - Semifinals:
    - United States 3–0 Costa Rica
    - Canada 3–1 Mexico

==== Handball ====
- European Men's Championship in Belgrade, Serbia:
  - Semifinals:
    - Denmark 25–24 Spain
    - Serbia 26–22 Croatia
- Asian Men's Championship in Jeddah, Saudi Arabia:
  - Group A:
    - South Korea 25–13 Jordan
    - Iran 26–27 Kuwait
  - Group B: Qatar 41–19 Uzbekistan

==== Tennis ====
- Grand Slams:
  - Australian Open in Melbourne, Australia, day 12:
    - Men's singles semifinals: **Novak Djokovic** (SRB) [1] def. Andy Murray (GBR) [4] 6–3, 3–6, 6–7(4–7), 6–1, 7–5
    - Women's doubles – final: **Svetlana Kuznetsova** (RUS) / **Vera Zvonareva** (RUS) def. Sara Errani (ITA) / Roberta Vinci (ITA) [11] 5–7, 6–4, 6–3
      - Kuznetsova wins her second Australian Open and Grand Slam women's doubles title.
      - Zvonareva wins her second Grand Slam women's doubles title.
    - Boys' doubles – final: **Liam Broady** (GBR) / **Joshua Ward-Hibbert** (GBR) [6] def. Adam Pavlásek (CZE) / Filip Veger (CRO) 6–3, 6–2
    - Girls' doubles – final: **Gabrielle Andrews** (USA) / **Taylor Townsend** (USA) def. Irina Khromacheva (RUS) / Danka Kovinić (MNE) [1] 5–7, 7–5, [10–6]
    - Wheelchair men's doubles final: **Ronald Vink** (NED) / **Robin Ammerlaan** (NED) [2] def. Stéphane Houdet (FRA) / Nicolas Peifer (FRA) [1] 6–2, 4–6, 6–1
    - Wheelchair women's doubles final: **Esther Vergeer** (NED) / **Sharon Walraven** (NED) [1] def. Aniek van Koot (NED) / Marjolein Buis (NED) [2] 4–6, 6–2, 6–4

==== Water polo ====
- Men's European Championship in Eindhoven, Netherlands:
  - Semifinals:
    - Italy 8–12 Serbia
    - Montenegro 14–13 Hungary

=== January 26, 2012 (Thursday) ===
==== Basketball ====
- Euroleague Top 16 matchday 2:
  - Group E: Galatasaray Medical Park (Turkey) 78–77 (Greece) Olympiacos
  - Group H: Maccabi Tel Aviv (Israel) 57–71 (Spain) FC Barcelona Regal

==== Figure skating ====
- European Championships in Sheffield, Great Britain:
  - Pairs (all (RUS)): (gold) Tatiana Volosozhar/Maxim Trankov 210.45 points (silver) Vera Bazarova/Yuri Larionov 193.79 (bronze) Ksenia Stolbova/Fedor Klimov 171.81
    - Volosozhar and Trankov win their first European title.

==== Football (soccer) ====
- Africa Cup of Nations in Equatorial Guinea and Gabon:
  - Group B in Malabo:
    - Sudan 2–2 Angola
    - Ivory Coast 2–0 Burkina Faso
- Copa Libertadores First Stage, first leg: Peñarol (Uruguay) 4–0 (Venezuela) Caracas

==== Handball ====
- Asian Men's Championship in Jeddah, Saudi Arabia:
  - Group B:
    - United Arab Emirates 40–20 Uzbekistan
    - Bahrain 23–23 Saudi Arabia

==== Snooker ====
- Championship League Group four in Stock, England:
  - Final (both (ENG): Mark Selby 1–3 **Mark Davis**

==== Tennis ====
- Grand Slams:
  - Australian Open in Melbourne, Australia, day 11:
    - Women's singles semifinals:
      - **Victoria Azarenka** (BLR) [3] def. Kim Clijsters (BEL) [11] 6–4, 1–6, 6–3
      - **Maria Sharapova** (RUS) [4] def. Petra Kvitová (CZE) [2] 6–2, 3–6, 6–4
    - Men's singles Semifinals: **Rafael Nadal** (ESP) [2] def. Roger Federer (SUI) [3] 6–7(5), 6–2, 7–6(5), 6–4
    - Wheelchair quad doubles final: **Andrew Lapthorne** (GBR) / **Peter Norfolk** (GBR) def. David Wagner (USA) / Noam Gershony (ISR) 6–4, 6–2

==== Water polo ====
- Women's European Championship in Eindhoven, Netherlands:
  - Semifinals:
    - Hungary 12–14 Greece
    - Italy 13–12 Russia

=== January 25, 2012 (Wednesday) ===
==== Basketball ====
- Euroleague Top 16 matchday 2:
  - Group E: CSKA Moscow (Russia) 96–68 (Turkey) Anadolu Efes
  - Group F:
    - Gescrap Bizkaia (Spain) 85–70 (Spain) Unicaja
    - Real Madrid (Spain) 69–88 (Italy) Montepaschi Siena
  - Group G:
    - Fenerbahçe Ülker (Turkey) 65–63 (Italy) EA7 Emporio Armani
    - Panathinaikos (Greece) 83–89 (Russia) UNICS Kazan
  - Group H: Bennet Cantù (Italy) 79–78 (Lithuania) Žalgiris Kaunas

==== Football (soccer) ====
- Africa Cup of Nations in Equatorial Guinea and Gabon:
  - Group A in Bata:
    - Libya 2–2 Zambia
    - Equatorial Guinea 2–1 Senegal
- Copa Libertadores First Stage, first leg:
  - Real Potosí (Bolivia) 2–1 (Brazil) Flamengo
  - Internacional (Brazil) 1–0 (Colombia) Once Caldas
  - Unión Española (Chile) 1–0 (Mexico) UANL

==== Handball ====
- European Men's Championship in Serbia (teams in **bold** advance to the semifinals):
  - Group I in Belgrade:
    - Poland 33–32 Germany
    - **Denmark** 31–24 Sweden
    - **Serbia** 19–22 North Macedonia
      - Standings: Serbia 7 points, Denmark 6, Germany, Macedonia, Poland 5, Sweden 2.
  - Group II in Novi Sad:
    - France 29–29 Iceland
    - **Spain** 35–32 Slovenia
    - Hungary 24–24 **Croatia**
      - Standings: Spain 9, Croatia 7, Slovenia, Hungary 4, Iceland, France 3.

==== Tennis ====
- Grand Slams:
  - Australian Open in Melbourne, Australia, day 10:
    - Men's singles quarterfinals:
      - **Andy Murray** (GBR) [4] def. Kei Nishikori (JPN) [24] 6–3, 6–3, 6–1
      - **Novak Djokovic** (SRB) [1] def. David Ferrer (ESP) [5] 6–4, 7–6(4), 6–1
    - Women's singles quarterfinals:
      - **Petra Kvitová** (CZE) [2] def. Sara Errani (ITA) 6–4, 6–4
      - **Maria Sharapova** (RUS) [4] def. Ekaterina Makarova (RUS) 6–2, 6–3

==== Water polo ====
- Men's European Championship in Eindhoven, Netherlands:
  - Quarterfinals:
    - Italy 9–4 Germany
    - Greece 9–11 Montenegro

=== January 24, 2012 (Tuesday) ===
==== Alpine skiing ====
- Men's World Cup in Schladming, Austria:
  - Slalom:

==== Football (soccer) ====
- Africa Cup of Nations in Equatorial Guinea and Gabon:
  - Group D in Franceville:
    - Ghana 1–0 Botswana
    - Mali 1–0 Guinea
- CONCACAF Women's Olympic Qualifying Tournament in Vancouver, Canada (teams in **bold** advance to the semifinals):
  - Group B:
    - Guatemala 6–0 Dominican Republic
    - **United States** 4–0 **Mexico**
      - Standings: United States 9 points, Mexico 6, Guatemala 3, Dominican Republic 0.
- Copa Libertadores First Stage, first leg:
  - Arsenal (Argentina) 3–0 (Peru) Sport Huancayo
  - El Nacional (Ecuador) 1–0 (Paraguay) Libertad

==== Handball ====
- European Men's Championship in Serbia:
  - Group II in Novi Sad:
    - Spain 31–26 Iceland
    - France 22–29 Croatia
    - Hungary 30–32 Slovenia

==== Snooker ====
- Championship League Group three in Stock, England:
  - Final: Mark Selby (ENG) 2–3 **Neil Robertson** (AUS)

==== Tennis ====
- Grand Slams:
  - Australian Open in Melbourne, Australia, day 9:
    - Men's singles quarterfinals:
      - **Rafael Nadal** (ESP) [2] def. Tomáš Berdych (CZE) [7] 6–7(5), 7–6(6), 6–4, 6–3
      - **Roger Federer** (SUI) [3] def. Juan Martín del Potro (ARG) [11] 6–4, 6–3, 6–2
    - Women's singles quarterfinals:
      - **Kim Clijsters** (BEL) [11] def. Caroline Wozniacki (DEN) [1] 6–3, 7–6(4)
      - **Victoria Azarenka** (BLR) [3] def. Agnieszka Radwańska (POL) [8] 6–7(0), 6–0, 6–2

==== Water polo ====
- Women's European Championship in Eindhoven, Netherlands:
  - Quarterfinals:
    - Hungary 11–9 Spain
    - Italy 13–13 (4–2 pen.) Netherlands

=== January 23, 2012 (Monday) ===
==== Football (soccer) ====
- Africa Cup of Nations in Equatorial Guinea and Gabon:
  - Group C in Libreville:
    - Gabon 2–0 Niger
    - Morocco 1–2 Tunisia
- CONCACAF Women's Olympic Qualifying Tournament in Vancouver, Canada (teams in **bold** advance to the semifinals):
  - Group A:
    - Cuba 0–3 Haiti
    - **Canada** 5–1 **Costa Rica**
      - Standings: Canada 9 points, Costa Rica 6, Haiti 3, Cuba 0.

==== Handball ====
- European Men's Championship in Serbia:
  - Group I in Belgrade:
    - Poland 25–27 North Macedonia
    - Denmark 28–26 Germany
    - Serbia 24–21 Sweden

==== Tennis ====
- Grand Slams:
  - Australian Open in Melbourne, Australia, day 8:
    - Men's singles 4th round:
      - **Novak Djokovic** (SRB) [1] def. Lleyton Hewitt (AUS) 6–1, 6–3, 4–6, 6–3
      - **Andy Murray** (GBR) [4] def. Mikhail Kukushkin (KAZ) 6–1, 6–1, 1–0 retired
      - **David Ferrer** (ESP) [5] def. Richard Gasquet (FRA) [17] 6–4, 6–4, 6–1
      - **Kei Nishikori** (JPN) [24] def. Jo-Wilfried Tsonga (FRA) [6] 2–6, 6–2, 6–1, 3–6, 6–3
    - Women's singles 4th round:
      - **Petra Kvitová** (CZE) [2] def. Ana Ivanovic (SRB) [21] 6–2, 7–6(7–2)
      - **Maria Sharapova** (RUS) [4] def. Sabine Lisicki (GER) [14] 3–6, 6–2, 6–3

==== Water polo ====
- Men's European Championship in Eindhoven, Netherlands (teams in **bold** advance to the semifinals, teams in italics advance to the quarterfinals):
  - Group A:
    - Turkey 2–22 **Hungary**
    - North Macedonia 8–10 Netherlands
    - Italy 10–7 Greece
      - Standings: Hungary 15 points, Italy 12, Greece 9, Netherlands 6, Macedonia 3, Turkey 0.
  - Group B:
    - Croatia 11–10 Spain
    - **Serbia** 7–11 Montenegro
    - Romania 9–10 Germany
      - Standings: Serbia 12 points, Montenegro 10, Germany, Croatia 9, Spain 4, Romania 0.

=== January 22, 2012 (Sunday) ===
==== Alpine skiing ====
- Men's World Cup in Kitzbühel, Austria:
  - Slalom:
  - Combined:
- Women's World Cup in Kranjska Gora, Slovenia:
  - Slalom:

==== American football ====
- NFL playoffs:
  - Conference Championships:
    - AFC: New England Patriots 23, Baltimore Ravens 20
    - NFC: New York Giants 20, San Francisco 49ers 17 (OT)

==== Auto racing ====
- World Rally Championship:
  - (Monaco) Rallye Automobile Monte-Carlo in Monte Carlo:

==== Biathlon ====
- World Cup 6 in Antholz-Anterselva, Italy:
  - 12.5 km Mass Start Women:
  - 4x7.5 km Relay Men:

==== Bobsleigh ====
- World Cup in St. Moritz, Switzerland:
  - Four-man:

==== Cricket ====
- Sri Lanka in South Africa:
  - 5th ODI in Johannesburg: South Africa 312/4 (50 overs); Sri Lanka 314/8 (49.5 overs). **Sri Lanka win by 2 wickets, South Africa win the 5-match series 3–2**.

==== Cross-country skiing ====
- World Cup in Otepää, Estonia:
  - 15 km Classic men:
  - 10 km Classic women:

==== Figure skating ====
- Canadian Championships in Moncton, New Brunswick:
  - Men: (gold) Patrick Chan 302.14 points (silver) Kevin Reynolds 239.44 (bronze) Jeremy Ten 207.50
    - Chan wins the title for the fifth successive time.

==== Football (soccer) ====
- Africa Cup of Nations in Equatorial Guinea and Gabon:
  - Group B in Malabo:
    - Ivory Coast 1–0 Sudan
    - Burkina Faso 1–2 Angola
- CONCACAF Women's Olympic Qualifying Tournament in Vancouver, Canada:
  - Group B:
    - Mexico 7–0 Dominican Republic
    - United States 13–0 Guatemala

==== Handball ====
- European Men's Championship in Serbia:
  - Group II in Novi Sad:
    - Hungary 21–27 Iceland
    - France 28–26 Slovenia
    - Spain 24–22 Croatia

==== Luge ====
- World Cup 6 in Winterberg, Germany:

==== Multi-sport events ====
- Winter Youth Olympics in Innsbruck, Austria:
  - Bobsleigh – Two-boys:
  - Bobsleigh – Two-Girls:
  - Curling – Mixed doubles:
  - Ice hockey – Boys:
  - Ice hockey – Girls:

==== Rugby union ====
- Heineken Cup pool stage Matchday 6 (team in **bold** advances to the quarterfinals):
- Amlin Challenge Cup pool stage Matchday 6 (team in **bold** advances to the quarterfinals):

==== Snooker ====
- Masters in London, England:
  - Final: Neil Robertson (AUS) vs Shaun Murphy (ENG)

==== Speed skating ====
- World Cup 4 in Kearns, Utah, United States:
  - 500 m women:
  - 500 m men:
  - 1000 m women:
  - 1000 m men:

==== Tennis ====
- Grand Slams:
  - Australian Open in Melbourne, Australia, day 7:
    - Men's singles 4th round:
      - **Rafael Nadal** (ESP) [2] def. Feliciano López (ESP) [18] 6–4, 6–4, 6–2
      - **Roger Federer** (SUI) [3] def. Bernard Tomic (AUS) 6–4, 6–2, 6–2
      - **Tomáš Berdych** (CZE) [7] def. Nicolás Almagro (ESP) [10] 4–6, 7–6(5), 7–6(3), 7–6(2)
    - Women's singles 4th round:
      - **Caroline Wozniacki** (DEN) [1] def. Jelena Janković (SRB) [13] 6–0, 7–5
      - **Victoria Azarenka** (BLR) [3] def. Iveta Benešová (CZE) 6–2, 6–2
      - **Kim Clijsters** (BEL) [11] def. Li Na (CHN) [5] 4–6, 7–6(6), 6–4
        - Clijsters saves 4 match points in the second set tie-breaker.
      - **Agnieszka Radwańska** (POL) [8] def. Julia Görges (GER) [22] 6–1, 6–1

==== Water polo ====
- Women's European Championship in Eindhoven, Netherlands (teams in **bold** advance to the semifinals, teams in italics advance to the quarterfinals):
  - Group A:
    - Netherlands 12–6 Great Britain
    - Hungary 9–12 **Russia**
      - Standings: Russia 9 points, Hungary 6, Netherlands 3, Great Britain 0.
  - Group B:
    - Germany 12–18 Italy
    - **Greece** 8–6 Spain
      - Standings: Greece 9 points, Italy 6, Spain 3, Germany 0.

=== January 21, 2012 (Saturday) ===
==== Alpine skiing ====
- Men's World Cup in Kitzbühel, Austria:
  - Downhill:
- Women's World Cup in Kranjska Gora, Slovenia:
  - Giant slalom:

==== Biathlon ====
- World Cup 6 in Antholz-Anterselva, Italy:
  - 4x6 km Relay Women:
  - 15 km Mass Start Men:

==== Bobsleigh ====
- World Cup in St. Moritz, Switzerland:
  - Two-man:

==== Cross-country skiing ====
- World Cup in Otepää, Estonia:
  - Sprint Classic men:
  - Sprint Classic women:

==== Figure skating ====
- Canadian Championships in Moncton, New Brunswick:
  - Women: (gold) Amelie Lacoste 159.51 points (silver) Cynthia Phaneuf 157.94 (bronze) Kaetlyn Osmond 155.47
    - Lacoste wins the title for the first time.
  - Pairs: (gold) Meagan Duhamel / Eric Radford 190.11 points (silver) Jessica Dube / Sebastien Wolfe 171.60 (bronze) Paige Lawrence / Rudi Swiegers 168.84
    - Duhamel and Radford win the title for the first time.
  - Ice Dancing: (gold) Tessa Virtue / Scott Moir 180.02 points (silver) Kaitlyn Weaver / Andrew Poje 174.53 (bronze) Piper Gilles / Paul Poirier 163.54
    - Virtue and Moir win the title for the fourth time.

==== Football (soccer) ====
- Africa Cup of Nations in Equatorial Guinea and Gabon:
  - Group A in Bata:
    - Equatorial Guinea 1–0 Libya
    - Senegal 1–2 Zambia
- CONCACAF Women's Olympic Qualifying Tournament in Vancouver, Canada:
  - Group A:
    - Haiti 0–2 Costa Rica
    - Canada 2–0 Cuba

==== Freestyle skiing ====
- World Cup in Lake Placid, United States:
  - Aerials men:
  - Aerials women:

==== Handball ====
- European Men's Championship in Serbia:
  - Group I in Belgrade:
    - Poland 29–29 Sweden
    - Denmark 33–32 North Macedonia
    - Serbia 21–21 Germany

==== Luge ====
- World Cup 6 in Winterberg, Germany:
  - Men:
  - Doubles:

==== Multi-sport events ====
- Winter Youth Olympics in Innsbruck, Austria:

==== Rugby union ====
- Heineken Cup pool stage Matchday 6 (team in **bold** advances to the quarterfinals):
- Amlin Challenge Cup pool stage Matchday 6 (team in **bold** advances to the quarterfinals):

==== Skeleton ====
- World Cup in St. Moritz, Switzerland:
  - Men:

==== Ski jumping ====
- Men's World Cup in Zakopane, Poland:
  - HS 134 (night):

==== Speed skating ====
- World Cup 4 in Kearns, Utah, United States:
  - 500 m women:
  - 500 m men:
  - 1000 m women:
  - 1000 m men:

==== Tennis ====
- Grand Slams:
  - Australian Open in Melbourne, Australia, day 6:
    - Men's singles 3rd round:
      - **Novak Djokovic** (SRB) [1] def. Nicolas Mahut (FRA) 6–0, 6–1, 6–1
      - **Andy Murray** (GBR) [4] def. Michaël Llodra (FRA) 6–4, 6–2, 6–0
      - **David Ferrer** (ESP) [5] def. Juan Ignacio Chela (ARG) [27] 7–5, 6–2, 6–1
      - **Jo-Wilfried Tsonga** (FRA) [6] def. Frederico Gil (POR) 6–2, 6–2, 6–2
      - **Richard Gasquet** (FRA) [17] def. Janko Tipsarević (SRB) [9] 6–3, 6–3, 6–1
    - Women's singles 3rd round:
      - **Petra Kvitová** (CZE) [2] def. Maria Kirilenko (RUS) [27] 6–0, 1–0 retired
      - **Maria Sharapova** (RUS) [4] def. Angelique Kerber (GER) [30] 6–1, 6–2
      - **Ekaterina Makarova** (RUS) def. Vera Zvonareva (RUS) [7] 7–6(9–7), 6–1
      - **Zheng Jie** (CHN) def. Marion Bartoli (FRA) [9] 6–3, 6–3

==== Water polo ====
- Men's European Championship in Eindhoven, Netherlands:
  - Group A:
    - North Macedonia 5–15 Italy
    - Turkey 7–12 Netherlands
    - Greece 7–9 Hungary
  - Group B:
    - Serbia 14–5 Romania
    - Spain 10–10 Montenegro
    - Germany 10–9 Croatia

=== January 20, 2012 (Friday) ===
==== Alpine skiing ====
- Men's World Cup in Kitzbühel, Austria:
  - Super Giant slalom:

==== Biathlon ====
- World Cup 6 in Antholz-Anterselva, Italy:
  - 10 km Sprint Men:

==== Bobsleigh ====
- World Cup in St. Moritz, Switzerland (all GER):
  - Women: (gold) Anja Schneiderheinze/Lisette Thöne 2:17.84 (1:09.31, 1:08.53)) (silver) Cathleen Martini/Janine Tischer 2:17.93 (1:09.30, 1:08.63) (bronze) Sandra Kiriasis/Franziska Bertels 2:18.05 (1:09.46, 1:08.59)

==== Cricket ====
- Sri Lanka in South Africa:
  - 4th ODI in Kimberley: South Africa 299/7 (50 overs); Sri Lanka 304/5 (48.4 overs). **Sri Lanka win by 5 wickets**.

==== Football (soccer) ====
- CONCACAF Women's Olympic Qualifying Tournament in Vancouver, Canada:
  - Group B:
    - Mexico 5–0 Guatemala
    - Dominican Republic 0–14 United States

==== Freestyle skiing ====
- World Cup in Lake Placid, United States:
  - Aerials men:
  - Aerials women:

==== Handball ====
- European Men's Championship in Serbia (teams in **bold** advance to the Main Round):
  - Group C in Novi Sad:
    - **Spain** 30–27 Russia
    - **France** 23–26 **Hungary**
      - Standings: Spain 5 points, Hungary 4, France 2, Russia 1.
  - Group D in Vršac:
    - **Iceland** 32–34 **Slovenia**
    - Croatia 26–20 **Norway**
      - Standings: Croatia 6 points, Slovenia, Iceland, Norway 2.
- African Men's Championship in Salè, Morocco:
  - Bronze medal game: (bronze) **Egypt** 29–15 Morocco
  - Final: (gold) **Tunisia** 23–20 (silver) Algeria
    - Tunisia win the title for the second successive time and ninth time overall, and qualify for the 2012 Summer Olympics.
- African Women's Championship in Salé, Morocco:
  - Bronze medal game: (bronze) **DR Congo** 33–24 Algeria
  - Final: (gold) **Angola** 26–24 (silver) Tunisia
    - Angola win the title for the eighth successive time and 11th time overall, and qualify for the 2012 Summer Olympics.

==== Mixed martial arts ====
- UFC on FX: Guillard vs. Miller in Nashville, Tennessee, United States:
  - Heavyweight bout: **Patrick Barry** (USA) def. Christian Morecraft (USA) via KO (punches)
  - Bantamweight bout: **Mike Easton** (USA) def. Jared Papazian (USA) via majority decision (29–28, 30–27, 29–29)
  - Welterweight bout: **Josh Neer** (USA) def. Duane Ludwig (USA) via technical submission (guillotine choke)
  - Lightweight bout: **Jim Miller** (USA) def. Melvin Guillard (USA) via submission (rear-naked choke)

==== Multi-sport events ====
- Winter Youth Olympics in Innsbruck, Austria:

==== Rugby union ====
- Heineken Cup pool stage Matchday 6 (team in **bold** advances to the quarterfinals):
- Amlin Challenge Cup pool stage Matchday 6 (team in **bold** advances to the quarterfinals):

==== Skeleton ====
- World Cup in St. Moritz, Switzerland:
  - Women: (gold) Elizabeth Yarnold (GBR) 1:11.93 (silver) Shelley Rudman (GBR) 1:12.18 (bronze) Katharina Heinz (GER) 1:12.22

==== Ski jumping ====
- Men's World Cup in Zakopane, Poland:
  - HS 134 (night):

==== Sumo ====
- Hatsu basho (January grand tournament) in Tokyo, Japan:
  - Baruto Kaito wins the tournament and becomes the first Estonian sumo wrestler to win a makuuchi (top division) championship in history.

==== Tennis ====
- Grand Slams:
  - Australian Open in Melbourne, Australia, day 5:
    - Men's singles 3rd round:
      - **Rafael Nadal** (ESP) [2] def. Lukáš Lacko (SVK) [Q] 6–2, 6–4, 6–2
      - **Roger Federer** (SUI) [3] def. Ivo Karlović (CRO) 7–6(6), 7–5, 6–3
      - **Tomáš Berdych** (CZE) [7] def. Kevin Anderson (RSA) [30] 7–6(5), 7–6(7–1), 6–1
      - **Nicolás Almagro** (ESP) [10] def. Stanislas Wawrinka (SUI) [21] 7–6(2), 6–2, 6–4
    - Women's singles 3rd round:
      - **Caroline Wozniacki** (DEN) [1] def. Monica Niculescu (ROU) [31] 6–2, 6–2
      - **Victoria Azarenka** (BLR) [3] def. Mona Barthel (GER) 6–2, 6–4
      - **Li Na** (CHN) [5] def. Anabel Medina Garrigues (ESP) [26] 3–0 retired
      - **Agnieszka Radwańska** (POL) [8] def. Galina Voskoboeva (RUS) 6–2, 6–2

==== Water polo ====
- Women's European Championship in Eindhoven, Netherlands:
  - Group A:
    - Russia 15–10 Great Britain
    - Hungary 9–8 Netherlands
  - Group B:
    - Germany 6–12 Greece
    - Italy 15–11 Spain

=== January 19, 2012 (Thursday) ===
==== Basketball ====
- Euroleague Top 16 matchday 1:
  - Group E: Anadolu Efes (Turkey) 68–62 (Turkey) Galatasaray Medical Park
  - Group F: Unicaja (Spain) 80–81 (Spain) Real Madrid
  - Group G: EA7 Emporio Armani (Italy) 57–78 (Greece) Panathinaikos
  - Group H:
    - FC Barcelona Regal (Spain) 65–60 (Italy) Bennet Cantù
    - Žalgiris Kaunas (Lithuania) 76–84 (Israel) Maccabi Tel Aviv

==== Biathlon ====
- World Cup 6 in Antholz-Anterselva, Italy:
  - 7.5 km Sprint Women: (gold) Magdalena Neuner (GER) 20:27.7 (0+1) (silver) Kaisa Mäkäräinen (FIN) 20:45.2 (0+0) (bronze) Darya Domracheva (BLR) 20:58.2 (2+0)

==== Cricket ====
- Pakistan vs England in UAE:
  - 1st Test in Dubai: England 192 (72.3 overs) & 160 (57.5 overs); Pakistan 338 (119.5 overs) & 15/0 (3.4 overs). **Pakistan win by 10 wickets**.

==== Football (soccer) ====
- CONCACAF Women's Olympic Qualifying Tournament in Vancouver, Canada:
  - Group A:
    - Costa Rica 2–0 Cuba
    - Canada 6–0 Haiti

==== Freestyle skiing ====
- World Cup in Lake Placid, United States:
  - Moguls men: (gold) Mikaël Kingsbury (CAN) 25.32 points (silver) Patrick Deneen (USA) 24.00 (bronze) Philippe Marquis (CAN) 21.86
  - Moguls women: (gold) Hannah Kearney (USA) 23.52 points (silver) Justine Dufour-Lapointe (CAN) 22.85 (bronze) Nikola Sudová (CZE) 22.78

==== Handball ====
- European Men's Championship in Serbia (teams in **bold** advance to the Main Round):
  - Group A in Belgrade:
    - **Poland** 27–26 **Denmark**
    - **Serbia** 21–21 Slovakia
      - Standings: Serbia 5 points, Poland 4, Denmark 2, Slovakia 1.
  - Group B in Niš:
    - **Germany** 29–24 **Sweden**
    - Czech Republic 21–27 **North Macedonia**
      - Standings: Germany 4 points, Macedonia, Sweden 3, Czech Republic 2.
- African Men's Championship in Salè, Morocco:
  - Semifinals:
    - Algeria 26–25 Egypt
    - Tunisia 28–16 Morocco
- African Women's Championship in Salé, Morocco:
  - Semifinals:
    - Angola 39–19 DR Congo
    - Algeria 24–27 Tunisia

==== Multi-sport events ====
- Winter Youth Olympics in Innsbruck, Austria:
  - Alpine skiing – Boys' giant slalom: (gold) Marco Schwarz (AUT) 1:51.70 (silver) Hannes Zingerle (ITA) 1:52.10 (bronze) Sandro Simonet (SUI) 1:52.33
  - Biathlon – Mixed relay: (gold) Germany (Franziska Preuß, Laura Hengelhaupt, Maximilian Janke, Niklas Homberg) 1:11:06.8 (silver) Norway (Kristin Sandeggen, Karoline Næss, Haakon Livik, Kristian André Aalerud) 1:13:11.7 (bronze) France (Léa Ducordeau, Chloé Chevalier, Fabien Claude, Aristide Bègue) 1:13:27.8
  - Cross-country skiing – Boys' sprint: (gold) Andreas Molden (NOR) 1:44.1 (silver) Marius Cebulla (GER) +0.6 (bronze) Alexander Selyaninov (RUS) +0.9
  - Cross-country skiing – Girls' sprint: (gold) Silje Theodorsen (NOR) 1:57.4 (silver) Jonna Sundling (SWE) +0.1 (bronze) Linn Eriksen (NOR) +0.1
  - Ice hockey – Boys' individual skills challenge: (gold) Augusts Valdis Vasiļonoks (LAT) 22 points (silver) Attila Kovács (HUN) 21 (bronze) Seiya Furukawa (JPN) 19
  - Ice hockey – Girls' individual skills challenge: (gold) Julie Zwarthoed (NED) 22 points (silver) Fanni Gasparics (HUN) 19 (bronze) Sharnita Crompton (AUS) 17
  - Short track speed skating – Boys' 500 metres: (gold) Yoon Su-Min (KOR) 42.417 (silver) Lim Hyo-Jun (KOR) 42.482 (bronze) Xu Hongzhi (CHN) 42.637
  - Short track speed skating – Girls' 500 metres: (gold) Shim Suk-Hee (KOR) 44.122 (silver) Xu Aili (CHN) 44.593 (bronze) Nicole Martinelli (ITA) 46.390

==== Rugby union ====
- Amlin Challenge Cup pool stage Matchday 6 (team in **bold** advances to the quarterfinals):
  - Pool 5:
    - Sale Sharks (England) 9–19 (France) **Brive**
    - Agen (France) 62–7 (Spain) La Vila
      - Standings: Brive 27 points, Sale Sharks 20, Agen 10, La Vila 0.

==== Snowboarding ====
- World Cup in Bad Gastein, Austria:
  - Giant slalom men: (gold) Roland Fischnaller (ITA) (silver) Aaron March (ITA) (bronze) Rok Flander (SLO)
  - Giant slalom women: (gold) Patrizia Kummer (SUI) (silver) Julie Zogg (SUI) (bronze) Marion Kreiner (AUT)
- World Cup in Veysonnaz, Switzerland:
  - Snowboard cross men: (gold) Andrey Boldykov (RUS) (silver) Nate Holland (USA) (bronze) Pierre Vaultier (FRA)
  - Snowboard cross women: (gold) Lindsey Jacobellis (USA) (silver) Aleksandra Zhekova (BUL) (bronze) Dominique Maltais (CAN)

==== Tennis ====
- Grand Slams:
  - Australian Open in Melbourne, Australia, day 4:
    - Men's singles 2nd round:
      - **Novak Djokovic** (SRB) [1] def. Santiago Giraldo (COL) 6–3, 6–2, 6–1
      - **Andy Murray** (GBR) [4] def. Édouard Roger-Vasselin (FRA) 6–1, 6–4, 6–4
      - **David Ferrer** (ESP) [5] def. Ryan Sweeting (USA) 6–7(4), 6–2, 3–6, 6–2, 6–3
      - **Jo-Wilfried Tsonga** (FRA) [6] def. Ricardo Mello (BRA) 7–5, 6–4, 6–4
      - **Janko Tipsarević** (SRB) [9] def. James Duckworth (AUS) 3–6, 6–2, 7–6(5), 6–4
    - Women's singles 2nd round:
      - **Petra Kvitová** (CZE) [2] def. Carla Suárez Navarro (ESP) 6–2, 2–6, 6–4
      - **Maria Sharapova** (RUS) [4] def. Jamie Hampton (USA) 6–0, 6–1
      - **Vera Zvonareva** (RUS) [7] def. Lucie Hradecká (CZE) 6–1, 7–6(3)
      - **Marion Bartoli** (FRA) [9] def. Jelena Dokić (AUS) 6–3, 6–2

==== Water polo ====
- Men's European Championship in Eindhoven, Netherlands:
  - Group A:
    - Hungary 14–9 North Macedonia
    - Greece 20–2 Turkey
    - Italy 14–6 Netherlands
  - Group B:
    - Germany 16–10 Spain
    - Croatia 12–15 Serbia
    - Romania 8–11 Montenegro

=== January 18, 2012 (Wednesday) ===
==== Basketball ====
- Euroleague Top 16 matchday 1:
  - Group E: Olympiacos (Greece) 78–86 (Russia) CSKA Moscow
  - Group F: Montepaschi Siena (Italy) 81–67 (Spain) Gescrap Bizkaia
  - Group G: UNICS Kazan (Russia) 76–71 (Turkey) Fenerbahçe Ülker

==== Football (soccer) ====
- OFC Champions League group stage Matchday 3:
  - Group B: Auckland City (New Zealand) 3–2 (Vanuatu) Amicale

==== Handball ====
- European Men's Championship in Serbia:
  - Group C in Novi Sad:
    - Russia 24–28 France
    - Spain 24–24 Hungary
  - Group D in Vršac:
    - Slovenia 29–31 Croatia
    - Iceland 34–32 Norway
- African Women's Championship in Salé, Morocco:
  - Quarterfinals:
    - Congo 19–29 Congo DR
    - Angola 41–20 Senegal
    - Algeria 23–22 Cameroon
    - Tunisia 24–19 Ivory Coast

==== Multi-sport events ====
- Winter Youth Olympics in Innsbruck, Austria:
  - Alpine skiing – Girls' giant slalom: (gold) Clara Direz (FRA) 1:56.13 (silver) Estelle Alphand (FRA) 1:56.34 (bronze) Jasmina Suter (SUI) 1:56.45
  - Curling – Mixed team: (gold) Switzerland (Michael Brunner, Elena Stern, Romano Meier, Lisa Gisler) (silver) Italy (Amos Mosaner, Denise Pimpini, Alessandro Zoppi, Arianna Losano) 1:29.428 (bronze) Canada (Thomas Scoffin, Corryn Brown, Derek Oryniak, Emily Gray)
  - Short track speed skating – Boys' 1000 metres: (gold) Lim Hyo-Jun (KOR) 1:29.284 (silver) Yoon Su-Min (KOR) 1:29.428 (bronze) Xu Hongzhi (CHN) 1:29.576
  - Short track speed skating – Girls' 1000 metres: (gold) Shim Suk-Hee (KOR) 1:31.661 (silver) Xu Aili (CHN) 1:33.351 (bronze) Sumire Kikuchi (JPN) 1:34.254
  - Speed skating – Boys' 3000 metres: (gold) Yang Fan (CHN) 4:03.22 (silver) Seitaro Ichinohe (JPN) 4:10.00 (bronze) Noh Hyeok-Jun (KOR) 4:14.41
  - Speed skating – Girls' 3000 metres: (gold) Sanneke de Neeling (NED) 4:37.33 (silver) Rio Harada (JPN) 4:41.85 (bronze) Jang Su-Ji (KOR) 4:42.72

==== Tennis ====
- Grand Slams:
  - Australian Open in Melbourne, Australia, day 3:
    - Men's singles 2nd round:
      - **Rafael Nadal** (ESP) [2] def. Tommy Haas (GER) 6–4, 6–3, 6–4
      - **Roger Federer** (SUI) [3] def. Andreas Beck (GER) Walkover
      - **Tomáš Berdych** (CZE) [7] def. Olivier Rochus (BEL) 6–1, 6–0, 7–6(4)
      - **Alejandro Falla** (COL) def. Mardy Fish (USA) [8] 7–6(4), 6–3, 7–6(6)
      - **Nicolás Almagro** (ESP) [10] def. Grigor Dimitrov (BUL) 4–6, 6–3, 6–7(4), 6–4, 6–0
    - Women's singles 2nd round:
      - **Caroline Wozniacki** (DEN) [1] def. Anna Tatishvili (GEO) 6–1, 7–6(4)
      - **Victoria Azarenka** (BLR) [3] def. Casey Dellacqua (AUS) 6–1, 6–0
      - **Li Na** (CHN) [5] def. Olivia Rogowska (AUS) 6–2, 6–2
      - **Agnieszka Radwańska** (POL) [8] def. Paula Ormaechea (ARG) 6–3, 6–1
      - **Romina Oprandi** (ITA) def. Francesca Schiavone (ITA) [10] 6–4, 6–3

==== Water polo ====
- Women's European Championship in Eindhoven, Netherlands:
  - Group A:
    - Great Britain 9–19 Hungary
    - Netherlands 10–11 Russia
  - Group B:
    - Spain 22–12 Germany
    - Greece 10–9 Italy

=== January 17, 2012 (Tuesday) ===
==== Cricket ====
- Sri Lanka in South Africa:
  - 3rd ODI in Bloemfontein: Sri Lanka 266/9 (50 overs); South Africa 179/5 (34.0 overs). **South Africa win by 4 runs (D/L)**.

==== Handball ====
- European Men's Championship in Serbia:
  - Group A in Belgrade:
    - Slovakia 24–41 Poland
    - Serbia 24–22 Denmark
  - Group B in Niš:
    - North Macedonia 23–24 Germany
    - Czech Republic 29–33 Sweden
- African Men's Championship in Salè, Morocco:
  - Quarterfinals:
    - Egypt 31–19 Senegal
    - DR Congo 31–33 Algeria
    - Tunisia 26–17 Cameroon
    - Angola 22–24 Morocco

==== Multi-sport events ====
- Winter Youth Olympics in Innsbruck, Austria:
  - Alpine skiing – Parallel mixed team: (gold) Austria (Martina Rettenwender, Marco Schwarz, Christina Ager, Mathias Graf) (silver) Norway (Nora Grieg Christensen, Martin Fjeldberg, Mina Fürst Holtmann, Marcus Monsen) (bronze) France (Estelle Alphand, Victor Schuller, Clara Direz, Leny Herpin)
  - Cross-country skiing – Girls' 5 kilometre classical: (gold) Anastasia Sedova (RUS) 14:18.0 (silver) Anamarija Lampic (SLO) 14:37.7 (bronze) Lea Einfalt (SLO) 15:01.2
  - Cross-country skiing – Boys' 10 kilometre classical: (gold) Alexander Selyaninov (RUS) 14:18.0 (silver) Kentaro Ishikawa (JPN) 14:37.7 (bronze) Sergey Malyshev (KAZ) 15:01.2
  - Figure skating – Girls' singles: (gold) Elizaveta Tuktamysheva (RUS) 173.10 points (silver) Adelina Sotnikova (RUS) 159.08 (bronze) Li Zijun (CHN) 157.70
  - Figure skating – Ice dancing: (gold) Anna Yanovskaya/Sergey Mozgov (RUS) 146.96 points (silver) Aleksandra Nazarova/Maxim Nikitin (UKR) 131.68 (bronze) Maria Simonova/Dmitri Dragun (RUS) 125.22
  - Luge – Mixed team relay: (gold) United States (Summer Britcher, Tucker West, Ty Andersen/Pat Edmunds) 2:18.310 (silver) Germany (Saskia Langer, Christian Paffe, Tim Brendl/Florian Funk) 2:18.708 (bronze) Austria (Miriam-Stefanie Kastlunger, Armin Frauscher, Tomas Steu/Lorenz Koller) 2:18.863

==== Tennis ====
- Grand Slams:
  - Australian Open in Melbourne, Australia, day 2:
    - Men's singles 1st round:
      - **Novak Djokovic** (SRB) [1] def. Paolo Lorenzi (ITA) 6–2, 6–0, 6–0
      - **Andy Murray** (GBR) [4] def. Ryan Harrison (USA) 4–6, 6–3, 6–4, 6–2
      - **David Ferrer** (ESP) [5] def. Rui Machado (POR) 6–1, 6–4, 6–2
      - **Jo-Wilfried Tsonga** (FRA) [6] def. Denis Istomin (UZB) 6–4, 3–6, 6–2, 7–5
      - **Janko Tipsarević** (SRB) [9] def. Dmitry Tursunov (RUS) 5–7, 7–6(12), 6–3, 6–4
    - Women's singles 1st round:
      - **Petra Kvitová** (CZE) [2] def. Vera Dushevina (RUS) 6–2, 6–0
      - **Maria Sharapova** (RUS) [4] def. Gisela Dulko (ARG) 6–0, 6–1
      - **Sorana Cîrstea** (ROU) def. Samantha Stosur (AUS) [6] 7–6(2), 6–3
      - **Vera Zvonareva** (RUS) [7] def. Alexandra Dulgheru (ROU) 7–6(4), 6–7(5), 6–3
      - **Marion Bartoli** (FRA) [9] def. Virginie Razzano (FRA) 7–5, 6–0

==== Water polo ====
- Men's European Championship in Eindhoven, Netherlands:
  - Group A:
    - North Macedonia 6–10 Greece
    - Netherlands 6–19 Hungary
    - Turkey 7–24 Italy
  - Group B:
    - Serbia 13–12 Germany
    - Spain 12–10 Romania
    - Montenegro 8–10 Croatia

=== January 16, 2012 (Monday) ===
==== Handball ====
- European Men's Championship in Serbia:
  - Group C in Novi Sad:
    - France 26–29 Spain
    - Hungary 31–31 Russia
  - Group D in Vršac:
    - Norway 28–27 Slovenia
    - Croatia 31–29 Iceland
- African Men's Championship in Salè, Morocco (teams in **bold** advance to the quarterfinals):
  - Group A:
    - Congo 19–33 **Senegal**
    - **Morocco** 24–20 Gabon
    - **Tunisia** 32–20 **DR Congo**
      - Standings: Tunisia 10 points, Morocco 8, DR Congo 6, Senegal 4, Congo 2, Gabon 0.
  - Group B:
    - **Angola** 32–25 **Cameroon**
    - Ivory Coast 35–13 Burkina Faso
    - **Egypt** 34–34 **Algeria**
      - Standings: Egypt, Algeria 9 points, Angola 6, Cameroon 4, Côte d'Ivoire 2, Burkina Faso 0.
- African Women's Championship in Salé, Morocco (teams in **bold** advance to the quarterfinals):
  - Group A:
    - **DR Congo** 28–28 **Ivory Coast**
    - Egypt 23–36 **Angola**
      - Standings: Angola 8 points, DR Congo, **Cameroon** 4, Côte d'Ivoire 3, Egypt 1.
  - Group B:
    - **Congo** 20–23 **Algeria**
    - **Senegal** 30–32 **Tunisia**
      - Standings: Tunisia 8 points, Algeria 6, Congo 4, Senegal 2, Morocco 0.

==== Multi-sport events ====
- Winter Youth Olympics in Innsbruck, Austria:
  - Biathlon – Boys' pursuit: (gold) Niklas Homberg (GER) 28:43.1 (silver) Rene Zahkna (EST) 28:52.6 (bronze) Cheng Fangming (CHN) 28:57.7
  - Biathlon – Girls' pursuit: (gold) Uliana Kaysheva (RUS) 26:01.3 (silver) Franziska Preuß (GER) 26:29.2 (bronze) Galina Vishnevskaya (KAZ) 27:44.4
  - Figure skating – Boys: (gold) Han Yan (CHN) 192.45 points (silver) Shoma Uno (JPN) 167.15 (bronze) Feodosiy Efremenkov (RUS) 163.46
  - Figure skating – Pairs: (gold) Yu Xiaoyu/Jin Yang (CHN) 153.82 points (silver) Lina Fedorova/Maxim Miroshkin (RUS) 134.19 (bronze) Anastasia Dolidze/Vadim Ivanov (RUS) 112.72
  - Luge – Girls' singles: (gold) Miriam-Stefanie Kastlunger (AUT) 1:20.197 (silver) Saskia Langer (GER) 1:20.414 (bronze) Ulla Zirne (LAT) 1:20.479
  - Luge – Doubles: (gold) Florian gruber/Simon Kainzwaldner (ITA) 1:25.194 (silver) Tim Brendl/Florian Funk (GER) 1:25.358 (bronze) Ty Andersen/Pat Edmunds (USA) 1:25.766
  - Speed skating – Boys' 1500 metres: (gold) Yang Fan (CHN) 1:54.20 (silver) Liu An (CHN) 2:00.28 (bronze) Seitaro Ichinohe (JPN) 2:00.30
  - Speed skating – Girls' 1500 metres: (gold) Jang Mi (KOR) 2:08.17 (silver) Sanneke de Neeling (NED) 2:09.54 (bronze) Sumire Kikuchi (JPN) 2:11.33

==== Tennis ====
- Grand Slams:
  - Australian Open in Melbourne, Australia, day 1:
    - Men's singles 1st round:
      - **Rafael Nadal** (ESP) [2] def. Alex Kuznetsov (USA) 6–4, 6–1, 6–1
      - **Roger Federer** (SUI) [3] def. Alexander Kudryavtsev (RUS) 7–5, 6–2, 6–2
      - **Tomáš Berdych** (CZE) [7] def. Albert Ramos (ESP) 7–5, 4–6, 6–2, 6–3
      - **Mardy Fish** (USA) [8] def. Gilles Müller (LUX) 6–4, 6–4, 6–2
      - **Nicolás Almagro** (ESP) [10] def. Łukasz Kubot (POL) 1–6, 7–5, 6–3, 7–5
    - Women's singles 1st round:
      - **Caroline Wozniacki** (DEN) [1] def. Anastasia Rodionova (AUS) 6–2, 6–1
      - **Victoria Azarenka** (BLR) [3] def. Heather Watson (GBR) 6–1, 6–0
      - **Li Na** (CHN) [5] def. Xeniya Pervak (KAZ) 6–3, 6–1
      - **Agnieszka Radwańska** (POL) [8] def. Bethanie Mattek-Sands (USA) 6–7(10), 6–4, 6–2
      - **Francesca Schiavone** (ITA) [10] def. Laura Pous Tió (ESP) 6–1, 6–3

==== Water polo ====
- Men's European Championship in Eindhoven, Netherlands:
  - Group A:
    - North Macedonia 16–4 Turkey
    - Greece 14–12 Netherlands
    - Hungary 12–8 Italy
  - Group B:
    - Croatia 10–7 Romania
    - Germany 7–13 Montenegro
    - Serbia 8–5 Spain

=== January 15, 2012 (Sunday) ===
==== Alpine skiing ====
- Men's World Cup in Wengen, Switzerland:
  - Slalom: (gold) Ivica Kostelić (CRO) 1:45.67 (silver) André Myhrer (SWE) 1:46.52 (bronze) Fritz Dopfer (GER) 1:46.55
- Women's World Cup in Cortina d'Ampezzo, Italy:
  - Super Giant slalom: (gold) Lindsey Vonn (USA) 1:26.16 (silver) Maria Höfl-Riesch (GER) 1:26.77 (bronze) Tina Maze (SLO) 1:27.02

==== American football ====
- NFL playoffs:
  - Divisional Playoffs:
    - AFC: Baltimore Ravens 20, Houston Texans 13
    - NFC: New York Giants 37, Green Bay Packers 20
      - Eli Manning throws three touchdowns to secure the Giants victory, thus for the seventh year in a row the NFL will crown a new Champion.

==== Auto racing ====
- Dakar Rally in Argentina, Chile and Peru:
  - Bikes: (gold) Cyril Despres (FRA) (KTM) 43:28:11 (silver) Marc Coma (ESP) (KTM) 44:21:31 (bronze) Hélder Rodrigues (POR) (Yamaha) 44:39:28
    - Despres wins the event for the fourth time.
  - Cars: (gold) Stéphane Peterhansel/Jean Paul Cottret (FRA) (Mini) 38:54:46 (silver) Joan Roma (ESP)/Michel Périn (FRA) (Mini) 39:36:42 (bronze) Giniel de Villiers (RSA)/Dirk von Zitzewitz (GER) (Toyota) 40:08:11
    - Peterhansel wins the event for the third time and sixth overall.
  - Trucks: (gold) Gérard de Rooy (NED)/Dariusz Rodewald (POL)/Tom Cosoul (BEL) (Iveco) 45:20:47 (silver) Hans Stacey/Hans Van Goor/Bernard der Kinderen (NED) (Iveco) 46:12:06 (bronze) Artur Ardavichus (KAZ)/Alexey Kuzmich (RUS)/Nurlan Turlubaev (KAZ) (Kamaz) 47:08:32
    - de Rooy wins the event for the first time.
  - All-terrain vehicles (quads) (all ARG): (gold) Alejandro Patronelli (Yamaha) 53:01:47 (silver) Marcos Patronelli (Yamaha) 54:22:08 (bronze) Tomas Maffei (Yamaha) 55:16:12
    - Patronelli wins the event for the second successive time.

==== Biathlon ====
- World Cup 5 in Nové Město, Czech Republic:
  - 10 km Pursuit Women: (gold) Tora Berger (NOR) 31:00.3 (0+1+2+0) (silver) Helena Ekholm (SWE) 31:18.2 (0+0+0+0) (bronze) Marie Laure Brunet (FRA) 31:25.4 (0+0+0+0)
  - 12.5 km Pursuit Men: (gold) Anton Shipulin (RUS) 34:50.8 (0+0+1+0) (silver) Martin Fourcade (FRA) & Arnd Peiffer (GER) 35:01.9 (1+0+1+1)

==== Bobsleigh ====
- World Cup in Königssee, Germany:
  - Four-man: (gold) Russia (Alexandr Zubkov, Filipp Yegorov, Dmitry Trunenkov, Maxim Mokrousov) 1:38.05 (49.22, 48.83) (silver) Germany (Manuel Machata, Marko Huebenbecker, Andreas Bredau, Christian Poser) 1:38.07 (49.24, 48.83) (bronze) Germany (Maximilian Arndt, Jan Speer, Alexander Rödiger, Martin Putze) 1:38.19 (49.30, 48.89)

==== Cricket ====
- India in Australia:
  - 3rd Test in Perth: India 161 (60.2 overs) & 171 (63.2 overs); Australia 369 (76.2 overs). **Australia win by an innings and 37 runs.**

==== Cross-country skiing ====
- World Cup in Milan, Italy:
  - Team Sprint Freestyle men: (gold) Alexey Petukhov/Nikolay Morilov (RUS) 14:34.8 (silver) Calle Halfvarsson/Teodor Peterson (SWE) 14:35.0 (bronze) David Hofer/Fulvio Scola (ITA) 14:35.4
  - Team Sprint Freestyle women: (gold) Hanna Brodin/Ida Ingemarsdotter (SWE) 16:14.7 (silver) Jessie Diggins/Kikkan Randall (USA) 16:15.6 (bronze) Perianne Jones/Chandra Crawford (CAN) 16:15.8

==== Darts ====
- BDO World Darts Championship in Frimley Green, England:
  - Men's final: Tony O'Shea (ENG) 5–7 **Christian Kist** (NED)

==== Freestyle skiing ====
- World Cup in Les Contamines, France:
  - Ski Cross men: (gold) Alex Fiva (SUI) (silver) Didrik Bastian Juell (NOR) (bronze) Nick Zoricic (CAN)
  - Ski Cross women: (gold) Sanna Lüdi (SUI) (silver) Alizée Baron (FRA) (bronze) Ophélie David (FRA)

==== Handball ====
- European Men's Championship in Serbia:
  - Group A in Belgrade:
    - Poland 18–22 Serbia
    - Denmark 30–25 Slovakia
  - Group B in Niš:
    - Germany 24–27 Czech Republic
    - Sweden 26–26 North Macedonia
- African Men's Championship in Salè, Morocco:
  - Group A:
    - Senegal 33–26 Gabon
    - Congo DR 35–31 Congo
    - Morocco 18–26 Tunisia
  - Group B:
    - Burkina Faso 15–30 Cameroon
    - Algeria 34–20 Ivory Coast
    - Angola 14–23 Egypt
- African Women's Championship in Salé, Morocco:
  - Group A:
    - Angola 40–15 Congo DR
    - Ivory Coast 19–26 Cameroon
  - Group B:
    - Tunisia 26–22 Congo
    - Algeria 31–7 Morocco

==== Luge ====
- World Cup 5 in Oberhof, Germany (GER unless stated):
  - Men: (gold) Felix Loch 1:28.042 (43.921, 44.121) (silver) David Möller 1:28.251 (44.100, 44.151) (bronze) Andi Langenhan 1:28.331 (44.152, 44.179)
  - Team relay: (gold) Germany (Natalie Geisenberger, Loch, Toni Eggert/Sascha Benecken) 2:24.768 (46.704, 48.786, 49.278) (silver) Italy (Sandra Gasparini, David Mair, Christian Oberstolz/Patrick Gruber) 2:26.061 (47.464, 49.203, 49.394) (bronze) Russia (Alexandra Rodionova, Viktor Kneib, Vladislav Yuzhakov/Vladimir Makhnutin) 2:26.142 (47.349, 49.384, 49.409)

==== Multi-sport events ====
- Winter Youth Olympics in Innsbruck, Austria:
  - Alpine skiing – Boys' combined: (gold) Marco Schwarz (AUT) 1:40.45 (silver) Miha Hrobat (SLO) 1:41.12 (bronze) Sandro Simonet (SUI) 1.41:45
  - Alpine skiing – Girls' combined: (gold) Magdalena Fjällström (SWE) 1:40.82 (silver) Estelle Alphand (FRA) 1:41.41 (bronze) Adriana Jelinkova (NED) 1:42.21
  - Biathlon – Boys' sprint: (gold) Cheng Fangming (CHN) 19:21.7 (silver) Rene Zahkna (EST) 19:43.0 (bronze) Aristide Begue (FRA) 19:48.5
  - Biathlon – Girls' sprint: (gold) Franziska Preuß (GER) 17:27.7 (silver) Galina Vishnevskaya (KAZ) 17:55.2 (bronze) Uliana Kaysheva (RUS) 18:00.9
  - Freestyle skiing – Boys' halfpipe: (gold) Kai Mahler (SUI) 95.00 (silver) Lauri Kivari (FIN) 90.00 (bronze) Aaron Blunck (USA) 87.50
  - Freestyle skiing – Girls' halfpipe: (gold) Elisabeth Gram (AUT) 84.75 (silver) Tiril Sjaastad Christiansen (NOR) 79.25 (bronze) Marine Tripier Mondancin (FRA) 69.50
  - Luge – Boys' singles: (gold) Christian Paffe (GER) 1:19.603 (silver) Riks Kristens Rozitis (LAT) 1:19.806 (bronze) Toni Graefe (GER) 1:19.920
  - Nordic combined – Individual: (gold) Tomas Portyk (CZE) 26:31.4 (silver) Ilkka Herola (FIN) 26:34.2 (bronze) Go Yamamoto (JPN) 26:39.9
  - Snowboarding – Boys' halfpipe: (gold) Ben Ferguson (USA) 93.25 (silver) Tim-Kevin Ravnjak (SLO) 86.75 (bronze) Taku Hiraoka (JPN) 84.25
  - Snowboarding – Girls' halfpipe: (gold) Hikaru Ohe (JPN) 96.25 (silver) Arielle Gold (USA) 90.00 (bronze) Lucile Lefevre (FRA) 82.25

==== Nordic combined ====
- World Cup in Chaux-Neuve, France:
  - HS 117 / 10 km: (gold) Alessandro Pittin (ITA) 22:18.1 (silver) Jørgen Graabak (NOR) 22:34.6 (bronze) Mikko Kokslien (NOR) 22:35.6

==== Rugby union ====
- Heineken Cup pool stage Matchday 5:
  - Pool 3: Glasgow Warriors (Scotland) 16–23 (Ireland) Leinster
  - Pool 5: Saracens (England) 20–16 (France) Biarritz
- Amlin Challenge Cup pool stage Matchday 5:
  - Pool 2:
    - Newcastle Falcons (England) 43–0 (Italy) Petrarca Padova
    - Toulon (France) 29–10 (France) Lyon

==== Ski jumping ====
- Men's World Cup in Tauplitz, Austria:
  - HS 200 (Ski flying):
    - First event: (gold) Robert Kranjec (SLO) 212.5 points (silver) Thomas Morgenstern (AUT) 206.8 (bronze) Anders Bardal (NOR) 201.6
    - Second event: (gold) Bardal 364.9 points (silver) Daiki Ito (JPN) 363.3 (bronze) Kamil Stoch (POL) 358.2
- Women's World Cup in Val di Fiemme, Italy:
  - HS 106: (gold) Sarah Hendrickson (USA) 285.9 points (silver) Daniela Iraschko (AUT) 273.1 (bronze) Ulrike Gräßler (GER) 250.8

==== Snowboarding ====
- World Cup in Bad Gastein, Austria:
  - Snowboard Cross: Cancelled due to lack of snow, rescheduled to January 19 in Veysonnaz, Switzerland.

==== Tennis ====
- ATP World Tour:
  - Apia International in Sydney, Australia:
    - Final: **Jarkko Nieminen** (FIN) def. Julien Benneteau (FRA) 6–2, 7–5
      - Nieminen wins the second title of his career.

=== January 14, 2012 (Saturday) ===
==== Alpine skiing ====
- Men's World Cup in Wengen, Switzerland:
  - Downhill: (gold) Beat Feuz (SUI) 2:35.31 (silver) Hannes Reichelt (AUT) 2:35.75 (bronze) Christof Innerhofer (ITA) 2:35.80
- Women's World Cup in Cortina d'Ampezzo, Italy:
  - Downhill: (gold) Daniela Merighetti (ITA) 1:33.17 (silver) Lindsey Vonn (USA) 1:33.38 (bronze) Maria Höfl-Riesch (GER) 1:33.57

==== American football ====
- NFL playoffs:
  - Divisional Playoffs:
    - NFC: San Francisco 49ers 36, New Orleans Saints 32
    - AFC: New England Patriots 45, Denver Broncos 10

==== Biathlon ====
- World Cup 5 in Nové Město, Czech Republic:
  - 10 km Sprint Men: (gold) Emil Hegle Svendsen (NOR) 27:13.1 (0+1) (silver) Simon Fourcade (FRA) 27:15.8 (1+2) (bronze) Martin Fourcade (FRA) 27:22.7 (1+1)

==== Bobsleigh ====
- World Cup in Königssee, Germany:
  - Two-man: (gold) Beat Hefti/Thomas Lamparter (SUI) 1:39.91 (50.04, 49.87) (silver) Lyndon Rush/Jesse Lumsden (CAN) 1:40.21 (50.23, 49.98) (bronze) Manuel Machata/Andreas Bredau (GER) 1:40.33 (50.34, 49.99)

==== Cricket ====
- Sri Lanka in South Africa:
  - 2nd ODI in East London: Sri Lanka 236/6 (50 overs); South Africa 237/5 (48.4 overs). **South Africa win by 5 wickets**.

==== Cross-country skiing ====
- World Cup in Milan, Italy:
  - Sprint Freestyle men: (gold) Eirik Brandsdal (NOR) (silver) Josef Wenzl (GER) (bronze) Teodor Peterson (SWE)
  - Sprint Freestyle women: (gold) Ida Ingemarsdotter (SWE) (silver) Kikkan Randall (USA) (bronze) Maiken Caspersen Falla (NOR)

==== Freestyle skiing ====
- World Cup in Mont Gabriel, Canada:
  - Dual Moguls men: (gold) Mikaël Kingsbury (CAN) (silver) Jeremy Cota (USA) (bronze) Sergey Volkov (RUS)
  - Dual Moguls women: (gold) Hannah Kearney (USA) (silver) Justine Dufour-Lapointe (CAN) (bronze) Ekaterina Stolyarova (RUS)

==== Luge ====
- World Cup 5 in Oberhof, Germany (GER unless stated):
  - Doubles: (gold) Toni Eggert/Sascha Benecken 1:23.544 (41.765, 41.779) (silver) Tobias Wendl/Tobias Arlt 1:23.775 (41.824, 41.951) (bronze) Andreas Linger/Wolfgang Linger (AUT) 1:24.199 (42.068, 42.131)
  - Women: (gold) Natalie Geisenberger 1:24.443 (42.393, 42.050) (silver) Tatjana Hüfner 1:24.690 (42.639, 42.051) (bronze) Anke Wischnewski 1:25.107 (42.681, 42.426)

==== Mixed martial arts ====
- UFC 142 in Rio de Janeiro, Brazil:
  - Lightweight bout: **Edson Barboza** (BRA) def. Terry Etim (ENG) via KO (spinning wheel kick)
  - Welterweight bout: **Carlo Prater** (BRA) def. Erick Silva (BRA) via disqualification (illegal blows to back of head)
  - Middleweight bout: **Rousimar Palhares** (BRA) def. Mike Massenzio (USA) via submission (heel hook)
  - Catchweight (197 lb) bout: **Vitor Belfort** (BRA) def. Anthony Johnson (USA) via submission (rear-naked choke)
  - Featherweight Championship bout: **José Aldo** (BRA) (c) def. Chad Mendes (USA) via KO (knee)

==== Multi-sport events ====
- Winter Youth Olympics in Innsbruck, Austria:
  - Alpine skiing – Boys' super-G: (gold) Adam Lamhamedi (MAR) 1:04.45 (silver) Fredrik Bauer (SWE) 1:04.57 (bronze) Joan Verdu Sanchez (AND) 1:04.65
    - Lamhamedi becomes the first African winner of a Winter Olympic event medal, while Sanchez wins Andorra's first ever Olympic medal.
  - Alpine skiing – Girls' super-G: (gold) Estelle Alphand (FRA) 1:05.78 (silver) Nora Grieg Christensen (NOR) 1:05.79 (bronze) Christina Ager (AUT) 1:06.06
  - Ski jumping – Boys' individual: (gold) Anže Lanišek (SLO) 286.1 points (silver) Mats S. Berggaard (NOR) 277.8 (bronze) Yukiya Sato (JPN) 260.1
  - Ski jumping – Girls' individual: (gold) Sara Takanashi (JPN) 269.3 points (silver) Katharina Althaus (GER) 242.5 (bronze) Urša Bogataj (SLO) 239.3
  - Speed skating – Boys' 500 metres: (gold) Liu An (CHN) 75.50 (silver) Roman Dubovik (BLR) 77.824 (bronze) Toshihiro Kakui (JPN) 77.827
  - Speed skating – Girls' 500 metres: (gold) Jang Mi (KOR) 81.68 (silver) Shi Xiaoxuan (CHN) 84.32 (bronze) Martine Lilloy Bruun (NOR) 87.51

==== Nordic combined ====
- World Cup in Chaux-Neuve, France:
  - HS 117 / 10 km: (gold) Alessandro Pittin (ITA) 22:48.6 (silver) Jason Lamy-Chappuis (FRA) 22:48.6 (bronze) Fabian Riessle (GER) 22:48.7

==== Rugby union ====
- Heineken Cup pool stage Matchday 5:
  - Pool 1:
    - Scarlets (Wales) 17–29 (England) Northampton Saints
    - Munster (Ireland) 26–10 (France) Castres
  - Pool 2: London Irish (England) 15–22 (Wales) Cardiff Blues
  - Pool 3: Montpellier (France) 24–22 (England) Bath
  - Pool 4: Aironi (Italy) 0–82 (France) Clermont
  - Pool 6:
    - Toulouse (France) 24–3 (Ireland) Connacht
    - Harlequins (England) 20–14 (England) Gloucester
- Amlin Challenge Cup pool stage Matchday 5:
  - Pool 1:
    - București Wolves (Romania) 13–34 (France) Stade Français
    - Worcester Warriors (England) 55–10 (Italy) Crociati Parma
  - Pool 3: Rovigo (Italy) 11–32 (England) London Wasps
  - Pool 4:
    - Cavalieri Prato (Italy) 10–50 (England) Exeter Chiefs
    - Perpignan (France) 27–13 (Wales) Newport Gwent Dragons
  - Pool 5: La Vila (Spain) 10–69 (England) Sale Sharks

==== Skeleton ====
- World Cup in Königssee, Germany:
  - Men: (gold) Frank Rommel (GER) 1:42.94 (51.23, 51.71) (silver) Alexander Kröckel (GER) 1:43.76 (52.11, 51.65) (bronze) Matthias Guggenberger (AUT) 1:43.86 (51.97, 51.89)

==== Ski jumping ====
- Women's World Cup in Val di Fiemme, Italy:
  - HS 106: (gold) Sarah Hendrickson (USA) 277.2 points (silver) Daniela Iraschko (AUT) 275.5 (bronze) Anette Sagen (NOR) 248.1

==== Snooker ====
- Marco Fu (HKG) compiles the 86th official maximum break in the qualifying stages of the World Open, and becomes the 14th player to make multiple maximum breaks.

==== Tennis ====
- ATP World Tour:
  - Apia International in Sydney, Australia:
    - Final: Julien Benneteau (FRA) vs. Jarkko Nieminen (FIN) – Cancelled and rescheduled to Sunday.
  - Heineken Open in Auckland, New Zealand:
    - Final: **David Ferrer** (ESP) def. Olivier Rochus (BEL) 6–3, 6–4
      - Ferrer wins the 12th title of his career, and his 3rd title at Auckland, also winning in 2007 and 2011.
- WTA Tour:
  - Moorilla Hobart International in Hobart, Australia:
    - Final: **Mona Barthel** (GER) def. Yanina Wickmayer (BEL) 6–1, 6–2
      - Barthel wins the first WTA title of her career.

=== January 13, 2012 (Friday) ===
==== Alpine skiing ====
- Men's World Cup in Wengen, Switzerland:
  - Super combined: (gold) Ivica Kostelic (CRO) 2:42.16 (1:53.41, 48.75) (silver) Beat Feuz (SUI) 2:42.36 (1:50.45, 51.91) (bronze) Bode Miller (USA) 2:42.61 (1:51.23, 51.38)

==== Biathlon ====
- World Cup 5 in Nové Město, Czech Republic:
  - 7.5 km Sprint Women: (gold) Olga Zaitseva (RUS) 23:08.1 (0+0) (silver) Tora Berger (NOR) 23:33.6 (1+1) (bronze) Magdalena Neuner (GER) 23:42.6 (0+3)

==== Bobsleigh ====
- World Cup in Königssee, Germany:
  - Women: (gold) Cathleen Martini/Berit Wiacker (GER) 1:43.56 (51.86, 51.70) (silver) Kaillie Humphries/Emily Baadsvik (CAN) 1:44.10 (52.34, 51.76) (silver) Fabienne Meyer/Hanne Schenk (SUI) 1:44.10 (52.35, 51.75)

==== Darts ====
- BDO World Darts Championship in Frimley Green, England:
  - Women's final: Deta Hedman (ENG) 1–2 **Anastasia Dobromyslova** (RUS)
    - Dobromyslova wins the title for the second time.

==== Handball ====
- African Men's Championship in Salè, Morocco:
  - Group A:
    - Gabon 20–21 Congo
    - Tunisia 30–21 Senegal
    - Congo DR 17–25 Morocco
  - Group B:
    - Egypt 32–18 Burkina Faso
    - Cameroon 32–19 Ivory Coast
    - Algeria 21–15 Angola
- African Women's Championship in Salé, Morocco:
  - Group A:
    - Congo DR 23–23 Egypt
    - Cameroon 18–24 Angola
  - Group B:
    - Congo 28–23 Senegal
    - Morocco 8–35 Tunisia

==== Nordic combined ====
- World Cup in Chaux-Neuve, France:
  - HS 117 / 10 km: (gold) Alessandro Pittin (ITA) 22:29.6 (silver) Jason Lamy-Chappuis (FRA) 22:34.0 (bronze) Fabian Riessle (GER) 22:35.6

==== Rugby union ====
- Heineken Cup pool stage Matchday 5:
  - Pool 2: Racing Métro (France) 24–27 (Scotland) Edinburgh
  - Pool 4: Ulster (Ireland) 41–7 (England) Leicester Tigers
  - Pool 5: Ospreys (Wales) 44–17 (Italy) Benetton Treviso
- Amlin Challenge Cup pool stage Matchday 5:
  - Pool 5: Brive (France) 50–13 (France) Agen

==== Skeleton ====
- World Cup in Königssee, Germany:
  - Women: (gold) Shelley Rudman (GBR) 1:46.15 (53.26, 52.89) (silver) Marion Thees (GER) 1:46.65 (53.41, 53.24) (bronze) Mellisa Hollingsworth (CAN) 1:47.19 (53.77, 53.42)

==== Snowboarding ====
- World Cup in Jauerling, Austria:
  - Slalom men: (gold) Andreas Prommegger (AUT) (silver) Andrey Sobolev (RUS) (bronze) Roland Fischnaller (ITA)
  - Slalom women: (gold) Patrizia Kummer (SUI) (silver) Yekaterina Tudegesheva (RUS) (bronze) Marion Kreiner (AUT)

==== Tennis ====
- WTA Tour:
  - Apia International in Sydney, Australia:
    - Final: **Victoria Azarenka** (BLR) def. Li Na (CHN) 6–2, 1–6, 6–3
      - Azarenka wins her ninth career title.

=== January 12, 2012 (Thursday) ===
==== Biathlon ====
- World Cup 5 in Nové Město, Czech Republic:
  - 20 km Individual Men: (gold) Andrei Makoveev (RUS) 47:19.0 (0+0+0+0) (silver) Emil Hegle Svendsen (NOR) 48:18.7 (1+0+0+1) (bronze) Björn Ferry (SWE) 48:33.8 (0+0+0+1)

==== Handball ====
- African Men's Championship in Salè, Morocco:
  - Group A:
    - Gabon 20–25 Congo DR
    - Senegal 26–31 Morocco
    - Congo 15–32 Tunisia
  - Group B:
    - Ivory Coast 21–40 Egypt
    - Burkina Faso 7–30 Angola
    - Cameroon 18–27 Algeria
- African Women's Championship in Salé, Morocco:
  - Group A:
    - Angola 25–23 Ivory Coast
    - Egypt 24–27 Cameroon
  - Group B:
    - Algeria 25–17 Senegal
    - Morocco 16–34 Congo

==== Rugby union ====
- Amlin Challenge Cup pool stage Matchday 5:
  - Pool 3: Bordeaux Bègles (France) 6–12 (France) Bayonne

==== Snooker ====
- Championship League Group two in Stock, England:
  - Final (both ENG): Mark Selby 0–3 **Shaun Murphy**
    - Murphy advances to the winners group.

=== January 11, 2012 (Wednesday) ===
==== Biathlon ====
- World Cup 5 in Nové Město, Czech Republic:
  - 15 km Individual Women: (gold) Kaisa Mäkäräinen (FIN) 45:03.3 (0+1+1+0) (silver) Helena Ekholm (SWE) 45:25.3 (0+0+0+1) (bronze) Magdalena Neuner (GER) 45:36.2 (0+1+0+1)

==== Cricket ====
- Sri Lanka in South Africa:
  - 1st ODI in Paarl: South Africa 301/8 (50 overs); Sri Lanka 43 (20.1 overs). **South Africa won by 258 runs**.

==== Freestyle skiing ====
- World Cup in Alpe d'Huez, France:
  - Ski Cross men: (gold) Filip Flisar (SLO) (silver) Christopher Del Bosco (CAN) (bronze) Lars Lewen (SWE)
  - Ski Cross women: (gold) Sanna Lüdi (SUI) (silver) Marielle Thompson (CAN) (bronze) Andrea Limbacher (AUT)

==== Handball ====
- African Men's Championship in Salé, Morocco:
  - Group A:
    - Congo DR 26–21 Senegal
    - Tunisia 35–18 Gabon
    - Morocco 28–24 Congo
  - Group B:
    - Egypt 25–14 Cameroon
    - Angola 27–17 Ivory Coast
    - Algeria 33–16 Burkina Faso
- African Women's Championship in Salé, Morocco:
  - Group A:
    - Ivory Coast 28–16 Egypt
    - Cameroon 24–26 Congo DR
  - Group B:
    - Tunisia 29–17 Algeria
    - Senegal 25–15 Morocco

=== January 10, 2012 (Tuesday) ===
==== Snooker ====
- Championship League – Group one in Stock, England:
  - Final (both ENG): **Judd Trump** 3–2 Shaun Murphy
    - Trump advances to the winners group.

=== January 9, 2012 (Monday) ===
==== American football ====
- NCAA bowl games:
  - BCS National Championship Game in New Orleans: Alabama 21, LSU 0
    - Jeremy Shelley kicks five field goals as the Crimson Tide win their 14th national title; they also become unanimous champions, as the Associated Press also names Alabama their national champions.

=== January 8, 2012 (Sunday) ===
==== Alpine skiing ====
- Men's World Cup in Adelboden, Switzerland:
  - Slalom: (gold) Marcel Hirscher (AUT) 1:58.66 (silver) Ivica Kostelić (CRO) 1:58.93 (bronze) Stefano Gross (ITA) 1:59.65
- Women's World Cup in Bad Kleinkirchheim, Austria:
  - Super Giant slalom: (gold) Fabienne Suter (SUI) 1:09.55 (silver) Tina Maze (SLO) 1:09.89 (bronze) Anna Fenninger (AUT) 1:10.29

==== American football ====
- NFL playoffs:
  - Wild Card Playoffs:
    - NFC: New York Giants 24, Atlanta Falcons 2
    - AFC: Denver Broncos 29, Pittsburgh Steelers 23 (OT)

==== Biathlon ====
- World Cup 4 in Oberhof, Germany:
  - 12.5 km Mass Start Women: (gold) Magdalena Neuner (GER) 40:02.2 (1+1+1+0) (silver) Tora Berger (NOR) 40:14.7 (1+0+1+0) (bronze) Andrea Henkel (GER) 40:34.2 (1+0+0+0)
  - 15 km Mass Start Men: (gold) Andreas Birnbacher (GER) 38:34.6 (0+0+0+0) (silver) Simon Fourcade (FRA) 38:38.9 (0+1+0+0) (bronze) Emil Hegle Svendsen (NOR) 39:04.2 (0+1+2+0)

==== Bobsleigh ====
- World Cup in Altenberg, Germany:
  - 4-man: (gold) Germany (Maximilian Arndt, Marko Huebenbecker, Alexander Rödiger, Martin Putze) 1:49.87 (54.73, 55.14) (silver) Russia (Alexandr Zubkov, Filipp Yegorov, Dmitry Trunenkov, Nikolay Hrenkov) 1:50.53 (55.16, 55.37) (bronze) Germany (Thomas Florschütz, Ronny Listner, Kevin Kuske, Thomas Blaschek) 1:50.79 (55.17, 55.62)

==== Cross-country skiing ====
- Tour de Ski:
  - Stage 9 in Val di Fiemme, Italy:
    - Men's 9 km Freestyle Final Climb: (gold) Alexander Legkov (RUS) 30:38.2 (silver) Maurice Manificat (FRA) +0.1 (bronze) Marcus Hellner (SWE) +1.7
      - Tour de Ski final standings: (gold) Dario Cologna (SUI) 4:33:17.2 (silver) Hellner +1:02.3 (bronze) Petter Northug (NOR) +1:44.6
        - Cologna wins the Tour de Ski for the third time.
    - Women's 9 km Freestyle Final Climb: (gold) Therese Johaug (NOR) 34:17.7 (silver) Justyna Kowalczyk (POL) +51.3 (bronze) Marit Bjørgen (NOR) +1:08.0
      - Tour de Ski final standings: (gold) Kowalczyk 2:52:45.0 (silver) Bjørgen +28.2 (bronze) Johaug +3:57.8
        - Kowalczyk wins the Tour de Ski for the third successive time.

==== Nordic combined ====
- World Cup in Oberstdorf, Germany:
  - HS 106 / 10 km: (gold) Mikko Kokslien (NOR) 26:06.5 (silver) Magnus Moan (NOR) 26:07.0 (bronze) Björn Kircheisen (GER) 26:07.7

==== Ski jumping ====
- Women's World Cup in Hinterzarten, Germany:
  - HS 108: (gold) Sarah Hendrickson (USA) 273.2 points (silver) Sara Takanashi (JPN) 242.6 (bronze) Jessica Jerome (USA) 240.1

==== Snooker ====
- Players Tour Championship – Event 12 in Fürstenfeldbruck, Germany (ENG unless stated):
  - Final: Joe Perry 2–4 **Stephen Maguire** (SCO)
    - Maguire wins his sixth professional title.
    - Final Order of Merit: (1) Judd Trump 30,400 (2) Ronnie O'Sullivan 29,600 (3) Neil Robertson (AUS) 28,100

==== Speed skating ====
- European Championships in Budapest, Hungary:
  - 5000 m Ladies: (gold) Martina Sáblíková (CZE) 7:22.38 (silver) Claudia Pechstein (GER) 7:34.51 (bronze) Ireen Wüst (NED) 7:43.59
  - 1500 m Men: (gold) Sven Kramer (NED) 1:53.98 (silver) Sverre Lunde Pedersen (NOR) 1:54.87 (bronze) Jan Blokhuijsen (NED) 1:54.93
  - 10000 m Men: (gold) Kramer 13:45.05 (silver) Blokhuijsen 13:52.48 (bronze) Håvard Bøkko (NOR) 14:02.83
  - Overall Ladies: (gold) Sáblíková 169.922 points (silver) Pechstein 172.312 (bronze) Wüst 172.454
    - Sáblíková wins the title for the third successive time and fourth time overall.
  - Overall Men: (gold) Kramer 156.197 points (silver) Blokhuijsen 156.513 (bronze) Bøkko 158.234
    - Kramer wins the title for the fifth time.

==== Tennis ====
- ATP World Tour:
  - Brisbane International in Brisbane, Australia:
    - Final: **Andy Murray** (GBR) def. Alexandr Dolgopolov (UKR) 6–1, 6–3
      - Murray wins his 22nd career title.
  - Aircel Chennai Open in Chennai, India:
    - Final: **Milos Raonic** (CAN) def. Janko Tipsarević (SRB) 6–7(4), 7–6(4), 7–6(4)
      - Raonic wins his second career title.
- WTA Tour:
  - ASB Classic in Auckland, New Zealand:
    - Final: **Zheng Jie** (CHN) def. Flavia Pennetta (ITA) 2–6, 6–3, 2–0 retired
      - Zheng wins her fourth career title.

=== January 7, 2012 (Saturday) ===
==== Alpine skiing ====
- Men's World Cup in Adelboden, Switzerland:
  - Giant slalom: (gold) Marcel Hirscher (AUT) 2:42.50 (silver) Benjamin Raich (AUT) 2:42.58 (bronze) Massimiliano Blardone (ITA) 2:42.60
- Women's World Cup in Bad Kleinkirchheim, Austria:
  - Downhill: (gold) Elisabeth Görgl (AUT) 1:48.40 (silver) Julia Mancuso (USA) 1:48.56 (bronze) Fabienne Suter (SUI) 1:48.90

==== American football ====
- NFL playoffs:
  - Wild Card Playoffs:
    - AFC: Houston Texans 31, Cincinnati Bengals 10
    - NFC: New Orleans Saints 45, Detroit Lions 28

==== Biathlon ====
- World Cup 4 in Oberhof, Germany:
  - 10 km Sprint Men: (gold) Arnd Peiffer (GER) 25:57.5 (1+0) (silver) Simon Fourcade (FRA) 25:58.6 (0+0) (bronze) Evgeny Ustyugov (RUS) 26:02.3 (0+0)

==== Bobsleigh ====
- World Cup in Altenberg, Germany:
  - 2-man: (gold) Thomas Florschütz/Kevin Kuske (GER) 56.26 (silver) Maximilian Arndt/Marko Huebenbecker (GER) 56.27 (bronze) Beat Hefti/Thomas Lamparter (SUI) 56.73

==== Cross-country skiing ====
- Tour de Ski:
  - Stage 8 in Val di Fiemme, Italy:
    - Men's 20 km Classic Mass Start: (gold) Eldar Rønning (NOR) 1:00:02.2 (silver) Alex Harvey (CAN) +1.1 (bronze) Dario Cologna (SUI) +1.3
    - Women's 10 km Classic Mass Start: (gold) Justyna Kowalczyk (POL) 25:49.8 (silver) Marit Bjørgen (NOR) +7.5 (bronze) Charlotte Kalla (SWE) +31.0

==== Freestyle skiing ====
- World Cup in St. Johann, Austria:
  - Ski Cross men: (gold) Alex Fiva (SUI) (silver) Brady Leman (CAN) (bronze) Daniel Bohnacker (GER)
  - Ski Cross women: (gold) Ophélie David (FRA) (silver) Anna Woerner (GER) (bronze) Alizée Baron (FRA)

==== Ice hockey ====
- World Women's U18 Championship in Zlín, Czech Republic:
  - Bronze medal game: (bronze) **Sweden** 4–1 Germany
  - Final: (silver) United States 0–3 (gold) **Canada**
    - Canada win the title for the second time.

==== Mixed martial arts ====
- Strikeforce: Rockhold vs. Jardine in Las Vegas, United States:
  - Welterweight bout: **Tarec Saffiedine** (BEL) def. Tyler Stinson (USA) via split decision (28–29, 30–27, 29–28)
  - Welterweight bout: **Tyron Woodley** (USA) def. Jordan Mein (CAN) via split decision (28–29, 29–28, 30–27)
  - Light Heavyweight bout: **Muhammed Lawal** (USA) def. Lorenz Larkin (USA) via KO (punches)
  - Middleweight bout: **Robbie Lawler** (USA) def. Adlan Amagov (RUS) via TKO (flying knee and punches)
  - Middleweight Championship bout: **Luke Rockhold** (USA) (c) def. Keith Jardine (USA) via TKO (punches)

==== Nordic combined ====
- World Cup in Oberstdorf, Germany:
  - HS 106 / Team: (gold) Norway (Magnus Moan, Mikko Kokslien, Jan Schmid, Joergen Graabak) 51:36.7 (silver) Germany (Johannes Rydzek, Fabian Riessle, Eric Frenzel, Tino Edelmann) 51:36.8 (bronze) Austria (Wilhelm Denifl, Christoph Bieler, Mario Stecher, Bernhard Gruber) 51:42.8

==== Skeleton ====
- World Cup in Altenberg, Germany:
  - Women: (gold) Anja Huber (GER) 59.87 (silver) Katharina Heinz (GER) 59.97 (bronze) Shelley Rudman (GBR) 59.99

==== Ski jumping ====
- Women's World Cup in Hinterzarten, Germany:
  - HS 108: (gold) Sabrina Windmüller (SUI) 114.7 points (silver) Lindsey Van (USA) 113.9 (bronze) Lisa Demetz (ITA) 110.7

==== Speed skating ====
- European Championships in Budapest, Hungary:
  - 500 m Men: (gold) Konrad Niedźwiedzki (POL) 36.89 (silver) Zbigniew Bródka (POL) 36.90 (bronze) Jan Blokhuijsen (NED) 36.93
  - 1500 m Ladies: (gold) Martina Sáblíková (CZE) 2:03.64 (silver) Linda de Vries (NED) 2:04.70 (bronze) Yuliya Skokova (RUS) 2:05.18
  - 5000 m Men: (gold) Sven Kramer (NED) 6:31.82 (silver) Jan Blokhuijsen (NED) 6:36.49 (bronze) Alexis Contin (FRA) 6:38.08

==== Tennis ====
- ATP World Tour:
  - Qatar Open in Doha, Qatar:
    - Final: **Jo-Wilfried Tsonga** (FRA) def. Gaël Monfils (FRA) 7–5, 6–3
      - Tsonga wins his eighth career title.
- WTA Tour:
  - Brisbane International in Brisbane, Australia:
    - Final: **Kaia Kanepi** (EST) def. Daniela Hantuchová (SVK) 6–2, 6–1
      - Kanepi wins her second career title.
- Hopman Cup in Perth, Australia:
  - Final: **Czech Republic** 2–0 France
    - Petra Kvitová (CZE) def. Marion Bartoli (FRA) 7–5, 6–1
    - Tomáš Berdych (CZE) def. Richard Gasquet (FRA) 7–6(0), 6–4
      - Czech Republic win the Cup for the second time.

=== January 6, 2012 (Friday) ===
==== Biathlon ====
- World Cup 4 in Oberhof, Germany:
  - 7.5 km Sprint Women: (gold) Magdalena Neuner (GER) 22:27.6 (0+0) (silver) Darya Domracheva (BLR) 23:04.9 (0+1) (bronze) Olga Zaitseva (RUS) 23:11.0 (0+0)

==== Bobsleigh ====
- World Cup in Altenberg, Germany:
  - Women: (gold) Cathleen Martini/Janine Tischer (GER) 1:54.67 (57.45, 57.22) (silver) Sandra Kiriasis/Petra Lammert (GER) 1:54.69 (57.49, 57.20) (bronze) Fabienne Meyer/Hanne Schenk (SUI) 1:55.23 (57.69, 57.54)

==== Cricket ====
- Sri Lanka in South Africa:
  - 3rd Test in Cape Town: South Africa 580/4d (139 Overs) & 2/0 (0.0 overs); Sri Lanka 239 (73.5 Overs) & 342 (f/o, 107.5 Overs). **South Africa win by 10 wickets, South Africa win the 3-match series 2–1**.
- India in Australia:
  - 2nd Test in Sydney: India 191 (59.3 Overs) & 400 (110.5 overs); Australia 659/4d (163 Overs). **Australia win by an innings and 68 runs, Australia lead the 4-match series 2–0.**
    - Michael Clarke's 329 not out is the highest score at the SCG and third-highest by an Australian captain in Test cricket.

==== Ice hockey ====
- World Women's U18 Championship in Zlín, Czech Republic, semifinals:
  - **United States** 7–1 Germany
  - **Canada** 7–0 Sweden

==== Luge ====
- World Cup 4 in Königssee, Germany (GER unless stated):
  - Men: (gold) Felix Loch 1:41.651 (50.878, 50.773) (silver) Armin Zöggeler (ITA) 1:41.868 (51.116, 50.752) (bronze) Johannes Ludwig 1:42.142 (51.218, 50.924)
  - Team relay: (gold) Italy (Sandra Gasparini, Dominik Fischnaller, Christian Oberstolz/Patrick Gruber) 2:51.375 (56.115, 57.860, 57.400) (silver) Germany (Tatjana Hüfner, Loch, Tobias Arlt/Tobias Wendl 2:51.531 (55.902, 57.674, 57.955) (bronze) Russia (Tatiana Ivanova, Albert Demtschenko, Vladislav Yuzhakov/Vladimir Makhnutin) 2:51.776 (55.681, 58.010, 58.085)

==== Skeleton ====
- World Cup in Altenberg, Germany:
  - Men: (gold) Martins Dukurs (LAT) 1:54.15 (51.23, 51.71) (silver) Tomass Dukurs (LAT) 1:55.22 (52.11, 51.65) (bronze) Alexander Kröckel (GER) 1:55.82 (51.97, 51.89)

==== Ski jumping ====
- Four Hills Tournament:
  - Stage 4 in Bischofshofen, Austria:
    - HS 140: (gold) Thomas Morgenstern (AUT) 138.7 points (silver) Anders Bardal (NOR) 136.5 (bronze) Gregor Schlierenzauer (AUT) 128.4
    - Four Hills Tournament final standings: (gold) Schlierenzauer 933.8 points (silver) Morgenstern 908.0 (bronze) Andreas Kofler (AUT) 896.6
      - Schlierenzauer wins the tournament for the first time.
- Women's World Cup in Schonach, Germany:
  - HS 108: Cancelled due to rain and warm temperatures; rescheduled to 7 January in Hinterzarten

==== Speed skating ====
- European Championships in Budapest, Hungary:
  - 500 m Ladies: (gold) Karolína Erbanová (CZE) 39.87 (silver) Ireen Wüst (NED) 40.21 (bronze) Yuliya Skokova (RUS) 40.40
  - 3000 m Ladies: (gold) Martina Sáblíková (CZE) 4:16.09 (silver) Natalia Czerwonka (POL) 4:19.41 (bronze) Claudia Pechstein (GER) 4:19.71

=== January 5, 2012 (Thursday) ===
==== Alpine skiing ====
- Men's World Cup in Zagreb, Croatia:
  - Slalom: (gold) Marcel Hirscher (AUT) 1:51.84 (silver) Felix Neureuther (GER) 1:52.13 (bronze) Ivica Kostelić (CRO) 1:52.32

==== Biathlon ====
- World Cup 4 in Oberhof, Germany:
  - 4x7.5 km Relay Men: (gold) Italy (Christian de Lorenzi, Markus Windisch, Dominik Windisch, Lukas Hofer) 1:30:49.1 (0+4) (silver) Russia (Anton Shipulin, Evgeniy Garanichev, Evgeny Ustyugov, Alexey Volkov) 1:30:55.2 (2+9) (bronze) Sweden (Tobias Arwidson, Björn Ferry, Fredrik Lindström, Carl Johan Bergman) 1:31:21.8 (0+3)

==== Cross-country skiing ====
- Tour de Ski:
  - Stage 7 in Cortina d'Ampezzo–Toblach, Italy:
    - Men's 32 km Freestyle Handicap Start: (gold) Dario Cologna (SUI) 1:09:25.2 (silver) Petter Northug (NOR) +1:15.8 (bronze) Alexander Legkov (RUS) +1:16.4
    - Women's 15 km Freestyle Handicap Start: (gold) Marit Bjørgen (NOR) 39:01.1 (silver) Justyna Kowalczyk (POL) +2.0 (bronze) Therese Johaug (NOR) +3:16.9

==== Ice hockey ====
- World Junior Championship in Calgary, Canada:
  - Bronze medal game: (bronze) **Canada** 4–0 Finland
  - Final: (gold) **Sweden** 1–0 (OT) (silver) Russia
    - Sweden win the title for the second time.

==== Luge ====
- World Cup 4 in Königssee, Germany (GER unless stated):
  - Doubles: (gold) Tobias Wendl/Tobias Arlt 1:41.172 (50.498, 50.674) (silver) Andreas Linger/Wolfgang Linger (AUT) 1:41.406 (50.515, 50.891) (bronze) Toni Eggert/Sascha Benecken 1:41.829 (50.958, 50.871)
  - Women: (gold) Tatjana Hüfner 1:41.900 (51.076, 50.824) (silver) Natalie Geisenberger 1:42.074 (50.860, 51.214) (bronze) Alex Gough (CAN) 1:42.630 (51.431, 51.199)

=== January 4, 2012 (Wednesday) ===
==== American football ====
- NCAA bowl games:
  - Orange Bowl in Miami Gardens, Florida: West Virginia 70, Clemson 33

==== Biathlon ====
- World Cup 4 in Oberhof, Germany:
  - 4x6 km Relay Women: (gold) Russia (Anna Bogaliy-Titovets, Svetlana Sleptsova, Olga Zaitseva, Olga Vilukhina) 1:19:32.0 (0+6) (silver) Norway (Fanny Welle-Strand Horn, Elise Ringen, Synnøve Solemdal, Tora Berger) 1:19:37.9 (2+7) (bronze) France (Marie Dorin Habert, Anais Bescond, Marine Bolliet, Sophie Boilley) 1:20:38.4 (1+7)

==== Cross-country skiing ====
- Tour de Ski:
  - Stage 6 in Toblach, Italy:
    - Men's Sprint Freestyle: (gold) Nikolay Morilov (RUS) 3:03.4 (silver) Petter Northug (NOR) +0.0 (bronze) Dario Cologna (SUI) +0.3
    - Women's Sprint Freestyle: (gold) Marit Bjørgen (NOR) 3:17.6 (silver) Kikkan Randall (USA) +0.5 (bronze) Justyna Kowalczyk (POL) +2.3

==== Ice hockey ====
- World Women's U18 Championship in Zlín, Czech Republic, quarterfinals:
  - **Sweden** 2–1 (OT) Finland
  - **Germany** 2–1 Czech Republic

==== Ski jumping ====
- Four Hills Tournament:
  - Stage 3 in Innsbruck, Austria:
    - HS 130: (gold) Andreas Kofler (AUT) 252.8 points (silver) Gregor Schlierenzauer (AUT) 247.6 (bronze) Taku Takeuchi (JPN) 246.7

=== January 3, 2012 (Tuesday) ===
==== Alpine skiing ====
- Women's World Cup in Zagreb, Croatia:
  - Slalom: (gold) Marlies Schild (AUT) 2:01.32 (59.34, 1:01.98) (silver) Tina Maze (SLO) 2:02.72 (1:00.24, 1:02.48) (bronze) Michaela Kirchgasser (AUT) 2:03.59 (1:00.50, 1:03.09)

==== American football ====
- NCAA bowl games:
  - Sugar Bowl in New Orleans: Michigan 23, Virginia Tech 20 (OT)

==== Cross-country skiing ====
- Tour de Ski:
  - Stage 5 in Toblach, Italy:
    - Men's 5 km Classic Individual: (gold) Alexander Legkov (RUS) 13:49.5 (silver) Eldar Rønning (NOR) +1.7 (bronze) Dario Cologna (SUI) +2.0
    - Women's 3 km Classic Individual: (gold) Marit Bjørgen (NOR) 10:49.2 (silver) Justyna Kowalczyk (POL) +3.9 (bronze) Astrid Uhrenholdt Jacobsen (NOR) +15.1

==== Ice hockey ====
- World Junior Championship in Calgary, Canada, semifinals:
  - **Sweden** 3–2 (GWS) Finland
  - Canada 5–6 **Russia**
- World Women's U18 Championship in Czech Republic (teams in **bold** advance to the semifinals, teams in italics advance to the quarterfinals):
  - Group A in Zlín:
    - Russia 2–6 Sweden
    - **United States** 13–1 Czech Republic
      - Final standings: United States 9 points, Sweden 6, Czech Republic 3, Russia 0.
  - Group B in Přerov:
    - Switzerland 1–6 Germany
    - **Canada** 7–0 Finland
      - Final standings: Canada 9 points, Germany, Finland, Switzerland 3.

=== January 2, 2012 (Monday) ===
==== American football ====
- NCAA New Year's Day bowl games:
  - TicketCity Bowl in Dallas: (20) Houston 30, (24) Penn State 14
  - Capital One Bowl in Orlando, Florida: (10) South Carolina 30, (21) Nebraska 13
  - Outback Bowl in Tampa, Florida: (12) Michigan State 33, (18) Georgia 30 (3OT)
  - Rose Bowl in Pasadena, California: (5) Oregon 45, (10) Wisconsin 38
  - Fiesta Bowl in Glendale, Arizona: (3) Oklahoma State 41, (4) Stanford 38 (OT)
- National Football League:
  - St. Louis Rams head coach Steve Spagnuolo and general manager Billy Devaney; Tampa Bay Buccaneers head coach Raheem Morris; and Indianapolis Colts vice chairman Bill Polian and general manager Chris Polian are fired. (Bloomberg Businessweek)

==== Darts ====
- PDC World Championship in London, England:
  - Final (both ENG): Andy Hamilton 3–7 **Adrian Lewis**
    - Lewis wins the title for the second successive time.

==== Ice hockey ====
- World Junior Championship in Calgary, Canada, quarterfinals:
  - **Finland** 8–5 Slovakia
  - **Russia** 2–1 (OT) Czech Republic
- 2012 NHL Winter Classic in Philadelphia:
  - New York Rangers 3, Philadelphia Flyers 2

=== January 1, 2012 (Sunday) ===
==== American football ====
- National Football League, regular season final week (teams in **bold** win division title, teams in italics clinch wild-card berth, playoff seeding in parentheses):
  - AFC:
    - (1) **New England Patriots** 49, Buffalo Bills 21
    - (2) **Baltimore Ravens** 24, (6) Cincinnati Bengals 16
    - Tennessee Titans 23, (3) **Houston Texans** 22
    - Kansas City Chiefs 7, (4) **Denver Broncos** 3
    - (5) Pittsburgh Steelers 13, Cleveland Browns 9
    - San Diego Chargers 38, Oakland Raiders 26
    - Miami Dolphins 19, New York Jets 17
    - Jacksonville Jaguars 19, Indianapolis Colts 13
  - NFC:
    - (1) **Green Bay** 45, (6) Detroit Lions 41
    - (2) **San Francisco 49ers** 34, St. Louis Rams 27
    - (3) **New Orleans Saints** 45, Carolina Panthers 17
      - Saints quarterback Drew Brees sets NFL single-season records for completions and completion percentage, and the team breaks the mark for most total yards in a season.
    - (4) **New York Giants** 31, Dallas Cowboys 14
    - (5) Atlanta Falcons 45, Tampa Bay 24
    - Chicago Bears 17, Minnesota Vikings 13
    - Philadelphia Eagles 34, Washington Redskins 10
    - Arizona Cardinals 23, Seattle Seahawks 20 (OT)

==== Cross-country skiing ====
- Tour de Ski:
  - Stage 4 in Oberstdorf, Germany:
    - Men's 10+10 km Pursuit: (gold) Petter Northug (NOR) 50:27.3 (silver) Dario Cologna (SUI) +0.3 (bronze) Maxim Vylegzhanin (RUS) +0.6
    - Women's 5+5 km Pursuit: (gold) Marit Bjørgen (NOR) 27:16.0 (silver) Justyna Kowalczyk (POL) +1.6 (bronze) Therese Johaug (NOR) +1.8

==== Darts ====
- PDC World Championship in London, England, semi-finals (ENG unless stated):
  - **Andy Hamilton** 6–5 Simon Whitlock (AUS)
  - **Adrian Lewis** 6–5 James Wade

==== Ice hockey ====
- World Women's U18 Championship in Czech Republic; matchday 1:
  - Group A in Zlín:
    - Czech Republic 2–0 Russia
    - Sweden 0–7 United States
  - Group B in Přerov:
    - Finland 3–5 Switzerland
    - Germany 0–6 Canada

==== Ski jumping ====
- Four Hills Tournament:
  - Stage 2 in Garmisch-Partenkirchen, Germany:
    - HS 140: (gold) Gregor Schlierenzauer (AUT) 274.5 points (silver) Andreas Kofler (AUT) 270.4 (bronze) Daiki Ito (JPN) 269.6
