= 2011–12 in skiing =

From August 28, 2011 to March 18, 2012, the following skiing events took place at various locations around the world.

== Alpine skiing ==
- October 22, 2011 – March 18, 2012: 2012 Alpine Skiing World Cup

== Biathlon ==
- November 28 – March 18 : 2011–12 Biathlon World Cup
- March 1 – March 11 : Biathlon World Championships 2012

== Freestyle skiing ==
- December 10 – March 18 : 2011–12 FIS Freestyle Skiing World Cup

== Nordic skiing ==
- November 25, 2011 – March 10, 2012: 2011–12 FIS Nordic Combined World Cup
- November 27, 2011 – March 18, 2012: 2011–12 FIS Ski Jumping World Cup
- November 19, 2011 – March 18, 2012: 2011–12 FIS Cross-Country World Cup
- December 29 – January 8: 2011–12 Tour de Ski
  - Dario Cologna of Switzerland for the men and Poland's Justyna Kowalczyk won the tournament for the third time.
- December 29 – January 6: 2011–12 Four Hills Tournament
  - Austria Gregor Schlierenzauer won the tournament for the first time in Bischofshofen, Austria

== Ski mountaineering ==
- February 4, 2012 – February 10, 2012: 2012 European Championship of Ski Mountaineering held in Pelvoux/Massif des Écrins, France

== Snowboarding ==
- August 28, 2011 and ended on March 17, 2012: 2011–12 FIS Snowboard World Cup
