= 2012 Championship League =

Championship League

Tournament information
- Dates: 9 January – 22 March 2012
- Venue: Crondon Park Golf Club
- City: Stock
- Country: England
- Organisation: Matchroom Sport
- Format: Non-ranking event
- Total prize fund: £192,700
- Winner's share: £10,000 (plus bonuses)
- Highest break: Mark Allen (NIR) (144)

Final
- Champion: Ding Junhui (CHN)
- Runner-up: Judd Trump (ENG)
- Score: 3–1

The 2012 Championship League was a professional non-ranking snooker tournament that was played from 9 January to 22 March 2012 at the Crondon Park Golf Club in Stock, England.

Matthew Stevens was the defending champion, but he was eliminated in group four.

Ding Junhui won in the final 3–1 against Judd Trump and earned a place in the 2012 Premier League Snooker.

== Prize fund ==
The breakdown of prize money for this year is shown below:

- Group 1–7
  - Winner: £3,000
  - Runner-up: £2,000
  - Semi-final: £1,000
  - Frame-win (league stage): £100
  - Frame-win (play-offs): £300
  - Highest break: £500
- Final group
  - Winner: £10,000
  - Runner-up: £5,000
  - Semi-final: £3,000
  - Frame-win: £300
  - Highest break: £1,000
- Tournament total: £192,700

== Group one ==
Group one matches were played on 9 and 10 January 2012. Judd Trump was the first player to qualify for the final group.

=== Matches ===
- Matthew Stevens 1–3 Mark Selby
- Shaun Murphy 2–3 Judd Trump
- Ali Carter 1–3 Mark Davis
- Andrew Higginson 3–1 Matthew Stevens
- Mark Selby 3–2 Shaun Murphy
- Judd Trump 3–0 Ali Carter
- Mark Davis 3–1 Andrew Higginson
- Matthew Stevens 2–3 Shaun Murphy
- Mark Selby 3–1 Judd Trump
- Ali Carter 3–0 Andrew Higginson
- Shaun Murphy 3–1 Andrew Higginson
- Mark Davis 3–2 Judd Trump
- Matthew Stevens 1–3 Mark Davis
- Mark Selby 3–2 Ali Carter
- Judd Trump 3–2 Andrew Higginson
- Shaun Murphy 3–0 Mark Davis
- Mark Selby 1–3 Andrew Higginson
- Matthew Stevens 3–0 Ali Carter
- Shaun Murphy 2–3 Ali Carter
- Mark Selby 3–2 Mark Davis
- Judd Trump 0–3 Matthew Stevens

=== Table ===
Pos	Player	Pld	W	L	FF	FA	FD	
1	Mark Selby (ENG)	6	5	1	16	11	+5	Qualification to Group 1 play-off
2	Mark Davis (ENG)	6	4	2	14	11	+3	Qualification to Group 1 play-off
3	Shaun Murphy (ENG)	6	3	3	15	12	+3	Qualification to Group 1 play-off
4	Judd Trump (ENG)	6	3	3	12	13	−1	Qualification to Group 1 play-off
5	Matthew Stevens (WAL)	6	2	4	11	12	−1	Advances into Group 2
6	Andrew Higginson (ENG)	6	2	4	10	14	−4	Eliminated from the competition
7	Ali Carter (ENG)	6	2	4	9	14	−5	Eliminated from the competition

=== Play-offs ===
Semi-finals; Best of 5 frames
1	Mark Selby (ENG)	1
4	Judd Trump (ENG)	3
2	Mark Davis (ENG)	1
3	Shaun Murphy (ENG)	3

Final; Best of 5 frames
4	Judd Trump (ENG)	3
3	Shaun Murphy (ENG)	2

== Group two ==
Group two matches were played on 11 and 12 January 2012. Shaun Murphy was the second player to qualify for the final group.

=== Matches ===
- Shaun Murphy 1–3 Mark Selby
- Mark Davis 3–1 Matthew Stevens
- Mark Williams 3–2 Neil Robertson
- Stuart Bingham 1–3 Shaun Murphy
- Mark Selby 3–1 Mark Davis
- Matthew Stevens 2–3 Mark Williams
- Neil Robertson 0–3 Stuart Bingham
- Shaun Murphy 3–0 Mark Davis
- Mark Selby 3–2 Matthew Stevens
- Mark Williams 0–3 Stuart Bingham
- Mark Davis 3–0 Stuart Bingham
- Neil Robertson 3–2 Matthew Stevens
- Shaun Murphy 2–3 Neil Robertson
- Mark Selby 3–2 Mark Williams
- Matthew Stevens 3–1 Stuart Bingham
- Mark Davis 2–3 Neil Robertson
- Mark Selby 3–2 Stuart Bingham
- Shaun Murphy 3–0 Mark Williams
- Mark Davis 3–0 Mark Williams
- Mark Selby 3–1 Neil Robertson
- Shaun Murphy 1–3 Matthew Stevens

=== Table ===
Pos	Player	Pld	W	L	FF	FA	FD	
1	Mark Selby (ENG)	6	6	0	18	9	+9	Qualification to Group 2 play-off
2	Shaun Murphy (ENG)	6	3	3	13	10	+3	Qualification to Group 2 play-off
3	Mark Davis (ENG)	6	3	3	12	10	+2	Qualification to Group 2 play-off
4	Neil Robertson (AUS)	6	3	3	12	15	−3	Qualification to Group 2 play-off
5	Matthew Stevens (WAL)	6	2	4	13	14	−1	Advances into Group 3
6	Stuart Bingham (ENG)	6	2	4	10	12	−2	Eliminated from the competition
7	Mark Williams (WAL)	6	2	4	8	16	−8	Eliminated from the competition

=== Play-offs ===
Semi-finals; Best of 5 frames
1	Mark Selby (ENG)	3
4	Neil Robertson (AUS)	1
2	Shaun Murphy (ENG)	3
3	Mark Davis (ENG)	0

Final; Best of 5 frames
1	Mark Selby (ENG)	0
2	Shaun Murphy (ENG)	3

== Group three ==
Group three matches were played on 23 and 24 January 2012. Neil Robertson was the third player to qualify for the final group.

=== Matches ===
- Mark Selby 3–0 Mark Davis
- Neil Robertson 3–2 Matthew Stevens
- Martin Gould 1–3 Jamie Cope
- Stephen Hendry 2–3 Mark Selby
- Mark Davis 3–2 Neil Robertson
- Matthew Stevens 1–3 Martin Gould
- Jamie Cope 3–2 Stephen Hendry
- Mark Selby 3–0 Neil Robertson
- Mark Davis 2–3 Matthew Stevens
- Martin Gould 3–2 Stephen Hendry
- Neil Robertson 3–1 Stephen Hendry
- Jamie Cope 0–3 Matthew Stevens
- Mark Selby 3–2 Jamie Cope
- Mark Davis 3–0 Martin Gould
- Matthew Stevens 3–2 Stephen Hendry
- Neil Robertson 3–1 Jamie Cope
- Mark Davis 3–1 Stephen Hendry
- Mark Selby 2–3 Martin Gould
- Neil Robertson 3–1 Martin Gould
- Mark Davis 1–3 Jamie Cope
- Mark Selby 1–3 Matthew Stevens

=== Table ===
Pos	Player	Pld	W	L	FF	FA	FD	
1	Mark Selby (ENG)	6	4	2	15	10	+5	Qualification to Group 3 play-off
2	Matthew Stevens (WAL)	6	4	2	15	11	+4	Qualification to Group 3 play-off
3	Neil Robertson (AUS)	6	4	2	14	11	+3	Qualification to Group 3 play-off
4	Mark Davis (ENG)	6	3	3	12	12	0	Qualification to Group 3 play-off
5	Jamie Cope (ENG)	6	3	3	12	13	−1	Advances into Group 4
6	Martin Gould (ENG)	6	3	3	11	14	−3	Eliminated from the competition
7	Stephen Hendry (SCO)	6	0	6	10	18	−8	Eliminated from the competition

=== Play-offs ===
Semi-finals; Best of 5 frames
1	Mark Selby (ENG)	3
4	Mark Davis (ENG)	2
2	Matthew Stevens (WAL)	2
3	Neil Robertson (AUS)	3

Final; Best of 5 frames
1	Mark Selby (ENG)	2
3	Neil Robertson (AUS)	3

== Group four ==
Group four matches were played on 25 and 26 January 2012. Mark Davis was the fourth player to qualify for the final group.

=== Matches ===
- Mark Selby 3–2 Matthew Stevens
- Mark Davis 3–1 Jamie Cope
- Mark Allen 3–1 Stephen Lee
- Peter Ebdon 0–3 Mark Selby
- Matthew Stevens 2–3 Mark Davis
- Jamie Cope 3–2 Mark Allen
- Stephen Lee 2–3 Peter Ebdon
- Mark Selby 3–0 Mark Davis
- Matthew Stevens 2–3 Jamie Cope
- Mark Allen 0–3 Peter Ebdon
- Mark Davis 3–1 Peter Ebdon
- Stephen Lee 3–2 Jamie Cope
- Mark Selby 3–1 Stephen Lee
- Matthew Stevens 1–3 Mark Allen
- Jamie Cope 1–3 Peter Ebdon
- Mark Davis 3–0 Stephen Lee
- Matthew Stevens 0–3 Peter Ebdon
- Mark Selby 3–2 Mark Allen
- Matthew Stevens 3–2 Stephen Lee
- Mark Davis 0–3 Mark Allen
- Mark Selby 3–0 Jamie Cope

=== Table ===
Pos	Player	Pld	W	L	FF	FA	FD	
1	Mark Selby (ENG)	6	6	0	18	5	+13	Qualification to Group 4 play-off
2	Peter Ebdon (ENG)	6	4	2	13	9	+4	Qualification to Group 4 play-off
3	Mark Davis (ENG)	6	4	2	12	10	+2	Qualification to Group 4 play-off
4	Mark Allen (NIR)	6	3	3	13	11	+2	Qualification to Group 4 play-off
5	Jamie Cope (ENG)	6	2	4	10	16	−6	Advances into Group 5
6	Matthew Stevens (WAL)	6	1	5	10	17	−7	Eliminated from the competition
7	Stephen Lee (ENG)	6	1	5	9	17	−8	Eliminated from the competition

=== Play-offs ===
Semi-finals; Best of 5 frames
1	Mark Selby (ENG)	3
4	Mark Allen (NIR)	2
2	Peter Ebdon (ENG)	0
3	Mark Davis (ENG)	3

Final; Best of 5 frames
1	Mark Selby (ENG)	1
3	Mark Davis (ENG)	3

== Group five ==
Group five matches were played on 6 and 7 February 2012. Barry Hawkins was the fifth player to qualify for the final group.

=== Matches ===
- Peter Ebdon 1–3 Mark Allen
- Jamie Cope 0–3 Barry Hawkins
- Ricky Walden 1–3 Mark King
- Mark Selby 2–3 Mark Allen
- Mark Selby 1–3 Peter Ebdon
- Mark Allen 3–2 Jamie Cope
- Barry Hawkins 0–3 Ricky Walden
- Mark King 1–3 Mark Selby
- Peter Ebdon 2–3 Jamie Cope
- Barry Hawkins 3–1 Mark King
- Mark Allen 2–3 Mark King
- Ricky Walden 0–3 Jamie Cope
- Mark Selby 3–0 Ricky Walden
- Peter Ebdon 2–3 Barry Hawkins
- Jamie Cope 1–3 Mark King
- Mark Allen 3–2 Ricky Walden
- Peter Ebdon 3–2 Mark King
- Mark Selby 2–3 Barry Hawkins
- Peter Ebdon 3–0 Ricky Walden
- Mark Allen 3–0 Barry Hawkins
- Mark Selby 2–3 Jamie Cope

=== Table ===
Pos	Player	Pld	W	L	FF	FA	FD	
1	Mark Allen (NIR)	6	5	1	17	10	+7	Qualification to Group 5 play-off
2	Barry Hawkins (ENG)	6	4	2	12	11	+1	Qualification to Group 5 play-off
3	Peter Ebdon (ENG)	6	3	3	14	12	+2	Qualification to Group 5 play-off
4	Mark King (ENG)	6	3	3	13	13	0	Qualification to Group 5 play-off
5	Jamie Cope (ENG)	6	3	3	12	13	−1	Advances into Group 6
6	Mark Selby (ENG)	6	2	4	13	13	0	Eliminated from the competition
7	Ricky Walden (ENG)	6	1	5	6	15	−9	Eliminated from the competition

=== Play-offs ===
Semi-finals; Best of 5 frames
1	Mark Allen (NIR)	2
4	Mark King (ENG)	3
2	Barry Hawkins (ENG)	3
3	Peter Ebdon (ENG)	2

Final; Best of 5 frames
4	Mark King (ENG)	2
2	Barry Hawkins (ENG)	3

== Group six ==
Group six matches were played on 8 and 9 February 2012. Mark Allen was the sixth player to qualify for the final group.

=== Matches ===
- Mark King 1–3 Mark Allen
- Peter Ebdon 3–2 Jamie Cope
- Marcus Campbell 3–0 Joe Perry
- Dominic Dale 3–1 Mark King
- Mark Allen 3–0 Peter Ebdon
- Jamie Cope 3–1 Marcus Campbell
- Joe Perry 1–3 Dominic Dale
- Mark King 1–3 Peter Ebdon
- Mark Allen 3–0 Jamie Cope
- Marcus Campbell 3–2 Dominic Dale
- Joe Perry 3–1 Jamie Cope
- Peter Ebdon 3–2 Dominic Dale
- Mark King 2–3 Joe Perry
- Mark Allen 3–2 Marcus Campbell
- Peter Ebdon 3–1 Joe Perry
- Dominic Dale 3–2 Jamie Cope
- Mark Allen 3–2 Dominic Dale
- Mark King 2–3 Marcus Campbell
- Peter Ebdon 3–1 Marcus Campbell
- Mark King 3–1 Jamie Cope
- Mark Allen 2–3 Joe Perry

=== Table ===
Pos	Player	Pld	W	L	FF	FA	FD	
1	Mark Allen (NIR)	6	5	1	17	8	+9	Qualification to Group 6 play-off
2	Peter Ebdon (ENG)	6	5	1	15	10	+5	Qualification to Group 6 play-off
3	Dominic Dale (WAL)	6	3	3	15	13	+2	Qualification to Group 6 play-off
4	Marcus Campbell (SCO)	6	3	3	13	13	0	Qualification to Group 6 play-off
5	Joe Perry (ENG)	6	3	3	11	14	−3	Advances into Group 7
6	Mark King (ENG)	6	1	5	10	16	−6	Eliminated from the competition
7	Jamie Cope (ENG)	6	1	5	9	16	−7	Eliminated from the competition

=== Play-offs ===
Semi-finals; Best of 5 frames
1	Mark Allen (NIR)	3
4	Marcus Campbell (SCO)	1
2	Peter Ebdon (ENG)	2
3	Dominic Dale (WAL)	3

Final; Best of 5 frames
1	Mark Allen (NIR)	3
3	Dominic Dale (WAL)	2

== Group seven ==
Group seven matches were played on 19 and 20 March 2012. Ding Junhui was the last player to qualify for the final group.

=== Matches ===
- Dominic Dale 3–1 Peter Ebdon
- Marcus Campbell 3–1 Joe Perry
- Ding Junhui 2–3 Ryan Day
- Tom Ford 3–0 Dominic Dale
- Peter Ebdon 1–3 Marcus Campbell
- Joe Perry 2–3 Ding Junhui
- Ryan Day 1–3 Tom Ford
- Dominic Dale 3–1 Marcus Campbell
- Peter Ebdon 2–3 Joe Perry
- Ding Junhui 1–3 Tom Ford
- Marcus Campbell 2–3 Tom Ford
- Ryan Day 3–0 Joe Perry
- Dominic Dale 0–3 Ryan Day
- Peter Ebdon 1–3 Ding Junhui
- Joe Perry 1–3 Tom Ford
- Marcus Campbell 3–0 Ryan Day
- Peter Ebdon 3–0 Tom Ford
- Dominic Dale 0–3 Ding Junhui
- Marcus Campbell 2–3 Ding Junhui
- Peter Ebdon 3–2 Ryan Day
- Dominic Dale 2–3 Joe Perry

=== Table ===
Pos	Player	Pld	W	L	FF	FA	FD	
1	Tom Ford (ENG)	6	5	1	15	8	+7	Qualification to Group 7 play-off
2	Ding Junhui (CHN)	6	4	2	15	11	+4	Qualification to Group 7 play-off
3	Marcus Campbell (SCO)	6	3	3	14	11	+3	Qualification to Group 7 play-off
4	Ryan Day (WAL)	6	3	3	12	11	+1	Qualification to Group 7 play-off
5	Peter Ebdon (ENG)	6	2	4	11	14	−3	Eliminated from the competition
6	Joe Perry (ENG)	6	2	4	10	16	−6	Eliminated from the competition
7	Dominic Dale (WAL)	6	2	4	8	14	−6	Eliminated from the competition

=== Play-offs ===
Semi-finals; Best of 5 frames
1	Tom Ford (ENG)	3
4	Ryan Day (WAL)	2
2	Ding Junhui (CHN)	3
3	Marcus Campbell (SCO)	0

Final; Best of 5 frames
1	Tom Ford (ENG)	0
2	Ding Junhui (CHN)	3

== Final group ==
The matches of the final group were played on 21 and 22 March 2012. Ding Junhui has qualified for the 2012 Premier League.

=== Matches ===
- Judd Trump 3–1 Shaun Murphy
- Neil Robertson 1–3 Mark Davis
- Barry Hawkins 1–3 Mark Allen
- Ding Junhui 2–3 Judd Trump
- Shaun Murphy 3–2 Neil Robertson
- Mark Davis 1–3 Barry Hawkins
- Mark Allen 2–3 Ding Junhui
- Judd Trump 3–1 Neil Robertson
- Shaun Murphy 3–2 Mark Davis
- Barry Hawkins 0–3 Ding Junhui
- Neil Robertson 0–3 Ding Junhui
- Mark Allen 3–2 Mark Davis
- Judd Trump 1–3 Mark Allen
- Shaun Murphy 0–3 Barry Hawkins
- Mark Davis 1–3 Ding Junhui
- Neil Robertson 3–1 Mark Allen
- Shaun Murphy 3–2 Ding Junhui
- Judd Trump 2–3 Barry Hawkins
- Neil Robertson 3–2 Barry Hawkins
- Shaun Murphy 1–3 Mark Allen
- Judd Trump 2–3 Mark Davis

=== Table ===
Pos	Player	Pld	W	L	FF	FA	FD	
1	Ding Junhui (CHN)	6	4	2	16	9	+7	Qualification to Winners' Group play-off
2	Mark Allen (NIR)	6	4	2	15	11	+4	Qualification to Winners' Group play-off
3	Judd Trump (ENG)	6	3	3	14	13	+1	Qualification to Winners' Group play-off
4	Barry Hawkins (ENG)	6	3	3	12	12	0	Qualification to Winners' Group play-off
5	Shaun Murphy (ENG)	6	3	3	11	15	−4	Eliminated from the competition
6	Mark Davis (ENG)	6	2	4	12	15	−3	Eliminated from the competition
7	Neil Robertson (AUS)	6	2	4	10	15	−5	Eliminated from the competition

=== Play-offs ===
Semi-finals; Best of 5 frames
1	Ding Junhui (CHN)	3
4	Barry Hawkins (ENG)	1
2	Mark Allen (NIR)	0
3	Judd Trump (ENG)	3

Final; Best of 5 frames
1	Ding Junhui (CHN)	3
3	Judd Trump (ENG)	1

== Century breaks ==
Total: 111

- **144** (W), 134, 130, 128, 125, 116, 115, 103, 100, 100 – Mark Allen
- **143** (2), 136, 127, 116, 115, 113, 109, 106 – Neil Robertson
- **142** (3), **142** (4), 138, 136, 133, 129, 128, 128, 122, 121, 118, 116, 111, 110, 110, 107, 100, 100 – Mark Selby
- **142** (6), 136, 122, 111, 101, 100 – Peter Ebdon
- 142, 127, 122, 117, 109, 105, 104, 102 – Ding Junhui
- **142** (5) – Ricky Walden
- **139** (7) – Marcus Campbell
- 137, 125, 102 – Dominic Dale
- 136, 131, 122, 110, 108, 101, 100 – Jamie Cope
- 136, 120, 115, 110, 105, 100 – Shaun Murphy
- **135** (1) – Andrew Higginson
- 133, 128, 100, 100 – Mark Davis
- 131, 121, 119, 118, 110, 109, 104, 101 – Judd Trump
- 130, 110, 108, 101 – Martin Gould
- 128, 103 – Mark King
- 127, 122, 118, 107, 105, 101 – Matthew Stevens
- 125, 112 – Stephen Hendry
- 123, 105, 101 – Tom Ford
- 122, 116 – Ryan Day
- 122, 115, 110, 110, 107, 100 – Barry Hawkins
- 120, 118, 101 – Ali Carter
- 101 – Stephen Lee
- 100 – Joe Perry

Bold: highest break in the indicated group.

== Winnings ==
No.	Player	1	2	3	4	5	6	7	W	TOTAL
1	Ding Junhui (CHN)							6,300	16,600	22,900
2	Mark Allen (NIR)				2,900	3,300	6,500		**8,500**	21,200
3	Mark Selby (ENG)	2,900	4,700	**5,500**	**5,500**	1,300				19,900
4	Mark Davis (ENG)	2,700	2,200	2,800	6,000				3,600	17,300
5	Judd Trump (ENG)	6,000							10,400	16,400
6	Shaun Murphy (ENG)	5,000	6,100						3,300	14,400
7	Barry Hawkins (ENG)					6,000			6,900	12,900
8	Neil Robertson (AUS)		**3,000**	6,200					3,000	12,200
9	Peter Ebdon (ENG)				2,300	3,000	**3,600**	1,100		10,000
10	Matthew Stevens (WAL)	1,100	1,300	3,100	1,000					6,500
11	Mark King (ENG)					4,800	1,000			5,800
=	Dominic Dale (WAL)						5,000	800		5,800
13	Marcus Campbell (SCO)						2,600	**2,900**		5,500
14	Tom Ford (ENG)							4,400		4,400
15	Jamie Cope (ENG)			1,200	1,000	1,200	900			4,300
16	Ryan Day (WAL)							2,800		2,800
17	Joe Perry (ENG)						1,100	1,000		2,100
18	Andrew Higginson (ENG)	**1,500**								1,500
19	Martin Gould (ENG)			1,100						1,100
=	Ricky Walden (ENG)					**1,100**				1,100
21	Stuart Bingham (ENG)		1,000							1,000
=	Stephen Hendry (SCO)			1,000						1,000
23	Ali Carter (ENG)	900								900
=	Stephen Lee (ENG)				900					900
25	Mark Williams (WAL)		800							800
	Total prize money	20,100	19,100	20,900	19,600	20,700	20,700	19,300	52,300	192,700

Green: Won the group. Bold: Highest break in the group. All prize money in GBP.
