= 2011–12 Tour de Ski =

Cross-country skiing event

Tour de Ski
2011–12 FIS Cross-Country World Cup

Ski tour details
- Venue(s): Oberhof, Germany; Oberstdorf, Germany; Lenzerheide, Switzerland; Toblach, Italy; Cortina d'Ampezzo, Italy; Val di Fiemme, Italy
- Dates: 29 December 2011 – 7 January 2012
- Stages: 9

Results
Men
Jersey awarded to the men's overall winner	Winner	Dario Cologna (SUI)
	Second	Marcus Hellner (SWE)
	Third	Petter Northug (NOR)
Jersey awarded to the men's sprint classification winner	Sprint	Dario Cologna (SUI)
Women
Jersey awarded to the women's overall winner	Winner	Justyna Kowalczyk (POL)
	Second	Marit Bjørgen (NOR)
	Third	Therese Johaug (NOR)
Jersey awarded to the women's sprint classification winner	Sprint	Justyna Kowalczyk (POL)

The 2011–12 Tour de Ski was the sixth edition of the Tour de Ski and took place from 29 December 2011 to 8 January 2012. The race started in Oberhof, Germany, and ended in Val di Fiemme, Italy. The defending champions were Dario Cologna of Switzerland for the men and Poland's Justyna Kowalczyk (two-time defending champion) for the women. Both Cologna and Kowalczyk were able to defend their titles as Tour de Ski champions and became the first athletes ever to win the Tour three times.

== Schedule ==
Stage	Venue	Date	Event	Technique	Distance		Start time (CET)	
Stage	Venue	Date	Event	Technique	Women	Men	Women	Men
1	Oberhof (GER)	29 December 2011	Prologue, individual start	Free	3.1 km	4.0 km	14:15	15:15
2	Oberhof (GER)	30 December 2011	Pursuit, 'handicap' start	Classic	10 km	15 km	14:15	15:15
3	Oberstdorf (GER)	31 December 2011	Sprint, qualification and finals	Classic	1.2 km	1.2 km	13:30 Q 14:30 F	
4	Oberstdorf (GER)	1 January 2012	Skiathlon	Classic/Free	5+5 km	10+10 km	13:00	15:45
5	Toblach (ITA)	3 January 2012	Distance, individual start	Classic	3 km	5 km	15:45	12:45
6	Toblach (ITA)	4 January 2012	Sprint, qualification and finals	Free	1.3 km	1.3 km	10:45 Q 12:15 F	
7	Cortina d'Ampezzo - Toblach (ITA)	5 January 2012	Distance, handicap start	Free	15 km	32 km	15:30	13:00
8	Val di Fiemme (ITA)	7 January 2012	Distance, mass start	Classic	10 km	20 km	15:45	12:30
9	Val di Fiemme (ITA)	8 January 2012	Final Climb, 'handicap' start	Free	9 km	9 km	12:30	14:30

== Final standings ==
Legend
Denotes the winner of the Overall standings	Denotes the winner of the Sprint standings

=== Overall standings ===
==== Men ====
Final overall standings (1–10)
Rank	Name	Time
1	Dario Cologna (SUI)	4:33:17.2
2	Marcus Hellner (SWE)	+1:02.3
3	Petter Northug (NOR)	+1:44.6
4	Devon Kershaw (CAN)	+2:09.4
5	Alexander Legkov (RUS)	+2:59.1
6	Lukáš Bauer (CZE)	+3:22.3
7	Maurice Manificat (FRA)	+3:43.7
8	Maxim Vylegzhanin (RUS)	+4:12.4
9	Martin Jakš (CZE)	+4:20.2
10	Ilia Chernousov (RUS)	+4:29.1

==== Women ====
Final overall standings (1–10)
Rank	Name	Time
1	Justyna Kowalczyk (POL)	2:52:45.0
2	Marit Bjørgen (NOR)	+28.2
3	Therese Johaug (NOR)	+3:57.8
4	Krista Lähteenmäki (FIN)	+6:48.6
5	Marthe Kristoffersen (NOR)	+6:55.1
6	Katrin Zeller (GER)	+7:09.7
7	Charlotte Kalla (SWE)	+8:01.2
8	Astrid Uhrenholdt Jacobsen (NOR)	+8:32.7
9	Aino-Kaisa Saarinen (FIN)	+8:34.2
10	Kikkan Randall (USA)	+8:55.8

=== Sprint standings ===
==== Men ====
Final sprint standings (1–10)
Rank	Name	Time
1	Dario Cologna (SUI)	3:56
2	Petter Northug (NOR)	3:53
3	Marcus Hellner (SWE)	1:52
4	Alexander Legkov (RUS)	1:44
5	Alex Harvey (CAN)	1:37
6	Devon Kershaw (CAN)	1:34
7	Maxim Vylegzhanin (RUS)	1:32
8	Lukáš Bauer (CZE)	1:11
9	Dmitry Yaparov (RUS)	1:04
10	Emil Jönsson (SWE)	0:58

==== Women ====
Final sprint standings (1–10)
Rank	Name	Time
1	Justyna Kowalczyk (POL)	4:04
2	Marit Bjørgen (NOR)	3:56
3	Kikkan Randall (USA)	1:40
4	Charlotte Kalla (SWE)	1:40
5	Ingvild Flugstad Østberg (NOR)	1:20
6	Aurore Jéan (FRA)	1:18
7	Astrid Uhrenholdt Jacobsen (NOR)	1:11
8	Therese Johaug (NOR)	1:09
9	Krista Lähteenmäki (FIN)	0:59
10	Marthe Kristoffersen (NOR)	0:56

== Stages ==
=== Stage 1 ===
29 December 2011, Oberhof, Germany - prologue

Men - 4.0 km freestyle
Place	Name	Time
1	Petter Northug (NOR)	7:58.3
2	Dario Cologna (SUI)	+0.7
3	Maurice Manificat (FRA)	+4.0
4	Marcus Hellner (SWE)	+5.6
5	Ilia Chernousov (RUS)	+6.8

Women - 3.1 km freestyle
Place	Name	Time
1	Justyna Kowalczyk (POL)	7:03.7
2	Marit Bjørgen (NOR)	+0.4
3	Hanna Brodin (SWE)	+4.0
4	Riikka Sarasoja-Lilja (FIN)	+4.1
5	Marthe Kristoffersen (NOR)	+4.2

=== Stage 2 ===
30 December 2011, Oberhof - pursuit (handicap start)

Men - 15 km classical (pursuit)
Place	Name	Time
1	Axel Teichmann (GER)	46:03.3
2	Petter Northug (NOR)	+2.3
3	Dario Cologna (SUI)	+2.9
4	Alexander Legkov (RUS)	+4.2
5	Eldar Rønning (NOR)	+5.3

Men - 15 km classical (stage)
Place	Name	Time
1	Eldar Rønning (NOR)	37:42.2
2	Giorgio di Centa (ITA)	+5.3
3	Lukáš Bauer (CZE)	+8.6
4	Axel Teichmann (GER)	+9.1
5	Sami Jauhojärvi (FIN)	+10.5

Women - 10 km classical (pursuit)
Place	Name	Time
1	Justyna Kowalczyk (POL)	32:04.4
2	Therese Johaug (NOR)	+0.2
3	Marit Bjørgen (NOR)	+7.1
4	Aino-Kaisa Saarinen (FIN)	+16.3
5	Krista Lähteenmäki (FIN)	+53.4

Women - 10 km classical (stage)
Place	Name	Time
1	Therese Johaug (NOR)	24:48.7
2	Aino-Kaisa Saarinen (FIN)	+21.8
3	Justyna Kowalczyk (POL)	+27.0
4	Marit Bjørgen (NOR)	+28.7
5	Masako Ishida (JPN)	+49.7

=== Stage 3 ===
31 December 2011, Oberstdorf, Germany

Men - 1.2 km Sprint Classic
Place	Name	Time
1	Nikita Kryukov (RUS)	2:28.6
2	Alexey Petukhov (RUS)	+0.7
3	Nikolay Morilov (RUS)	+1.2
4	Dmitriy Yaparov (RUS)	+1.7
5	Dario Cologna (SUI)	+3.7

Women - 1.2 km Sprint Classic
Place	Name	Time
1	Justyna Kowalczyk (POL)	2:45.3
2	Marit Bjørgen (NOR)	+3.2
3	Astrid Uhrenholdt Jacobsen (NOR)	+6.3
4	Natalya Matveyeva (RUS)	+8.0
5	Ida Ingemarsdotter (SWE)	+13.1

=== Stage 4 ===
1 January 2012, Oberstdorf - skiathlon

Men - 10+10 km
Place	Name	Time
1	Petter Northug (NOR)	50:27.3
2	Dario Cologna (SUI)	+0.3
3	Maxim Vylegzhanin (RUS)	+0.6
4	Marcus Hellner (SWE)	+1.5
5	Kristian Tettli Rennemo (NOR)	+1.7

Women - 5+5 km
Place	Name	Time
1	Marit Bjørgen (NOR)	27:16.0
2	Justyna Kowalczyk (POL)	+1.6
3	Therese Johaug (NOR)	+1.8
4	Kristin Størmer Steira (NOR)	+35.3
5	Riikka Sarasoja-Lilja (FIN)	+45.3

=== Stage 5 ===
3 January 2012, Toblach, Italy - distance

Men - 5.0 km classical
Place	Name	Time
1	Alexander Legkov (RUS)	13:49.5
2	Eldar Rønning (NOR)	+1.7
3	Dario Cologna (SUI)	+2.0
4	Lukáš Bauer (CZE)	+3.5
5	Ilia Chernousov (RUS)	+4.0

Women - 3.3 km classical
Place	Name	Time
1	Marit Bjørgen (NOR)	10:49.2
2	Justyna Kowalczyk (POL)	+3.9
3	Astrid Uhrenholdt Jacobsen (NOR)	+15.1
4	Nicole Fessel (GER)	+17.0
5	Stefanie Böhler (GER)	+17.2

=== Stage 6 ===
4 January 2012, Toblach, Italy - sprint

Men - sprint freestyle
Place	Name	Time
1	Nikolay Morilov (RUS)	3:03.4
2	Petter Northug (NOR)	+0.0
3	Dario Cologna (SUI)	+0.3
4	David Hofer (ITA)	+0.9
5	Alexey Petukhov (RUS)	+1.8

Women - sprint freestyle
Place	Name	Time
1	Marit Bjørgen (NOR)	3:17.6
2	Kikkan Randall (USA)	+0.5
3	Justyna Kowalczyk (POL)	+2.3
4	Denise Herrmann (GER)	+4.7
5	Vesna Fabjan (SLO)	+6.1

=== Stage 7 ===
5 January 2012, Cortina d'Ampezzo-Toblach - distance (handicap start)

Men - 32 km freestyle (pursuit)
Place	Name	Time
1	Dario Cologna (SUI)	1:09:25.2
2	Petter Northug (NOR)	+1:15.8
3	Alexander Legkov (RUS)	+1:16.4
4	Devon Kershaw (CAN)	+1:16.8
5	Marcus Hellner (SWE)	+1:17.2

Women - 15 km freestyle (pursuit)
Place	Name	Time
1	Marit Bjørgen (NOR)	39:01.1
2	Justyna Kowalczyk (POL)	+2.0
3	Therese Johaug (NOR)	+3:16.9
4	Krista Lähteenmäki (FIN)	+4:42.2
5	Kikkan Randall (USA)	+4:48.3

=== Stage 8 ===
7 January 2012, Val di Fiemme, Italy - distance (mass start)

Men - 20 km classical mass start
Place	Name	Time
1	Eldar Rønning (NOR)	1:00:02.2
2	Alex Harvey (CAN)	+1.1
3	Dario Cologna (SUI)	+1.3
4	Petter Northug (NOR)	+1.5
5	Sergey Turychev (RUS)	+2.3

Women - 10 km classical mass start
Place	Name	Time
1	Justyna Kowalczyk (POL)	25:49.8
2	Marit Bjørgen (NOR)	+7.5
3	Charlotte Kalla (SWE)	+31.0
4	Aino-Kaisa Saarinen (FIN)	+33.6
5	Yuliya Ivanova (RUS)	+42.3

=== Stage 9 ===
8 January 2012, Val di Fiemme - distance (handicap start)

Men - 9 km freestyle
Place	Name	Time
1	Alexander Legkov (RUS)	30:38.2
2	Maurice Manificat (FRA)	+0.1
3	Marcus Hellner (SWE)	+1.7
4	Roland Clara (ITA)	+16.2
5	Thomas Moriggl (ITA)	+30.7

Women - 9 km freestyle
Place	Name	Time
1	Therese Johaug (NOR)	34:17.7
2	Justyna Kowalczyk (POL)	+51.3
3	Marit Bjørgen (NOR)	+1:08.0
4	Marthe Kristoffersen (NOR)	+1:10.8
5	Valentyna Shevchenko (UKR)	+1:13.9
