= Golf at the SEA Games =

Golf has been contested at the SEA Games since the 1987 edition in Jakarta, Indonesia. It was held from 1987 to 2001, except in 2003, and has been contested at every edition since 2005.

The sport is normally contested in four medal events: men's individual, men's team, women's individual and women's team. Team medals are determined from the aggregate scores of players representing each national team in the corresponding individual competitions.

== Editions ==
Games	Year	Host city	Venue	Events	Best nation
XIV	1987	Jakarta, Indonesia	Rawamangun Course	4	Thailand
XV	1989	Kuala Lumpur, Malaysia	Saujana Golf and Country Club	4	Philippines
XVI	1991	Manila, Philippines	Valley Golf Club	4	Philippines
XVII	1993	Singapore, Singapore	Singapore Island Country Club	4	Philippines
XVIII	1995	Chiang Mai, Thailand	Chiang Mai–Lamphun Golf Club	4	Thailand
XIX	1997	Jakarta, Indonesia	Matoa National Golf Course, Ciganjur	4	Philippines
XX	1999	Bandar Seri Begawan, Brunei	Pantai Mentiri Golf Club	4	Thailand
XXI	2001	Kuala Lumpur, Malaysia	Sungai Long Golf and Country Club	4	Thailand
XXIII	2005	Manila, Philippines	The Country Club	4	Philippines
XXIV	2007	Nakhon Ratchasima, Thailand	Bonanza Golf and Country Club	4	Thailand
XXV	2009	Vientiane, Laos	SEA Games Golf Course	4	Thailand
XXVI	2011	Jakarta–Palembang, Indonesia	Jagorawi Golf and Country Club	4	Thailand
XXVII	2013	Naypyidaw, Myanmar	Royal Myanmar Golf Course	4	Thailand
XXVIII	2015	Singapore, Singapore	Sentosa Golf Club	4	Thailand
XXIX	2017	Kuala Lumpur, Malaysia	The Mines Resort and Golf Club	4	Thailand
XXX	2019	Manila, Philippines	Luisita Golf and Country Club	4	Philippines
XXXI	2021	Hanoi, Vietnam	Heron Lake Golf Course and Resort	4	Malaysia; Thailand
XXXII	2023	Phnom Penh, Cambodia	Garden City Golf Club	4	Thailand
XXXIII	2025	Bangkok–Chonburi, Thailand	Siam Country Club (Rolling Hills)	4	Thailand

== Events ==
Event	87	89	91	93	95	97	99	01	05	07	09	11	13	15	17	19	21	23	25	Years
Men's individual	X	X	X	X	X	X	X	X	X	X	X	X	X	X	X	X	X	X	X	19
Men's team	X	X	X	X	X	X	X	X	X	X	X	X	X	X	X	X	X	X	X	19
Women's individual	X	X	X	X	X	X	X	X	X	X	X	X	X	X	X	X	X	X	X	19
Women's team	X	X	X	X	X	X	X	X	X	X	X	X	X	X	X	X	X	X	X	19
Total	4	4	4	4	4	4	4	4	4	4	4	4	4	4	4	4	4	4	4	

== Medal table ==
Updated after the 2025 SEA Games. This table covers editions with medal data currently available from 2001 onward.

Rank	Nation	Gold	Silver	Bronze	Total
1	Thailand (THA)	29	17	11	57
2	Philippines (PHI)	9	5	7	21
3	Malaysia (MAS)	4	5	11	20
4	Indonesia (INA)	3	7	12	22
5	Singapore (SGP)	2	9	3	14
6	Vietnam (VIE)	1	2	3	6
7	Myanmar (MYA)	0	3	1	4
Totals (7 entries)		48	48	48	144

== Winners ==
The table below lists winners by event, based on available published results.

Year	Men's individual	Men's team	Women's individual	Women's team
1987	(Thailand) Thaworn Wiratchant	Thailand	(Philippines) Ruby Chico	Philippines
1989	(Singapore) Samson Gimson	Malaysia	(Philippines) Mary Grace Estuesta	Philippines
1991	(Indonesia) Sukamdi	Philippines	(Philippines) Mary Grace Estuesta	Philippines
1993	(Philippines) Rodolfo Cuello Jr.	Philippines	(Philippines) Janille Jose	Malaysia
1995	(Thailand) Chawalit Plaphol	Thailand	(Philippines) Jennifer Rosales	Philippines
1997	(Philippines) Gerald Rosales	Indonesia	(Philippines) Dorothy Delasin	Philippines
1999	(Philippines) Gerald Rosales	Philippines	(Thailand) Russamee Gulyanamitta	Thailand
2001	(Philippines) Juvic Pagunsan	Malaysia	(Thailand) Onnarin Sattayabanphot	Indonesia
2005	(Philippines) Juvic Pagunsan	Philippines	(Thailand) Nontaya Srisawang	Thailand
2007	(Thailand) Pipatpong Naewsuk	Thailand	(Thailand) Patcharajutar Kongkraphan	Thailand
2009	(Thailand) Wasin Sripattranusorn	Thailand	(Philippines) Chihiro Ikeda	Philippines
2011	(Thailand) Rattanon Wannasrichan	Thailand	(Indonesia) Tatiana Wijaya	Indonesia
2013	(Thailand) Danthai Boonma	Thailand	(Philippines) Princess Mary Superal	Philippines
2015	(Thailand) Natipong Srithong	Thailand	(Thailand) Suthavee Chanachai	Thailand
2017	(Thailand) Kosuke Hamamoto	Singapore	(Thailand) Atthaya Thitikul	Thailand
2019	(Singapore) James Leow Kwang Aik	Thailand	(Philippines) Bianca Pagdanganan	Philippines
2021	(Malaysia) Ervin Chang	Malaysia	(Thailand) Natthakritta Vongtaveelap	Thailand
2023	(Vietnam) Lê Khánh Hưng	Thailand	(Malaysia) Ng Jing Xuen	Thailand
2025	(Thailand) Fifa Laopakdee	Thailand	(Thailand) Prim Prachnakorn	Thailand

== See also ==
- Golf at the Asian Games
