= February 2012 in sports =

<<	February 2012					>>
Su	Mo	Tu	We	Th	Fr	Sa
			1	2	3	4
5	6	7	8	9	10	11
12	13	14	15	16	17	18
19	20	21	22	23	24	25
26	27	28	29
Sports

This list shows notable sports-related deaths, events, and notable outcomes that occurred in February of 2012.

== Current sporting seasons ==
=== American football 2011 ===
- National Football League
- NCAA Division I FBS
- NCAA Division I FCS

=== Auto racing 2012 ===
- World Rally Championship

=== Basketball 2012 ===
- NBA
- NCAA Division I men
- NCAA Division I women
- Euroleague
- EuroLeague Women
- Eurocup
- EuroChallenge
- ASEAN Basketball League
- Australia
- France
- Germany
- Greece
- Israel
- Italy
- Philippines
  - Commissioner's Cup
- Russia
- Spain
- Turkey

=== Cricket 2012 ===
- Australia:
  - Sheffield Shield
  - Ryobi One-Day Cup

=== Football (soccer) 2012 ===
National teams competitions

- 2014 FIFA World Cup qualification
- UEFA Women's Euro 2013 qualifying

International clubs competitions

- UEFA (Europe) Champions League
- UEFA Europa League
- UEFA Women's Champions League
- Copa Libertadores (South America)
- CONCACAF (North & Central America) Champions League
- OFC (Oceania) Champions League

Domestic (national) competitions

- Australia
- England
- France
- Germany
- Iran
- Italy
- Portugal
- Russia
- Scotland
- Spain

=== Ice hockey 2012 ===
- National Hockey League
- Kontinental Hockey League
- Czech Extraliga
- Elitserien
- Canadian Hockey League:
  - OHL, QMJHL, WHL
- NCAA Division I men
- NCAA Division I women

=== Rugby union 2012 ===
- Heineken Cup
- Amlin Challenge Cup
- Aviva Premiership
- RaboDirect Pro12
- LV= Cup
- Top 14
- Sevens World Series

=== Snooker 2012 ===
- Players Tour Championship

=== Tennis 2012 ===
- ATP World Tour
- WTA Tour

=== Volleyball 2012 ===
International clubs competitions

- Men's CEV Champions League
- Women's CEV Champions League

=== Winter sports ===
- Alpine Skiing World Cup
- Biathlon World Cup
- Bobsleigh World Cup
- Cross-Country Skiing World Cup
- Freestyle Skiing World Cup
- Luge World Cup
- Nordic Combined World Cup
- Short Track Speed Skating World Cup
- Skeleton World Cup
- Ski Jumping World Cup
- Snowboard World Cup
- Speed Skating World Cup

== Days of the month ==
=== February 29, 2012 (Wednesday) ===
==== Basketball ====
- Euroleague Top 16, week 6 (teams **in bold** advance to the quarterfinals):
  - Group G:
    - **UNICS Kazan** (Russia) 63–68 (Greece) **Panathinaikos**
    - EA7 Emporio Armani (Italy) 85–72 (Turkey) Fenerbahçe Ülker
      - Standings: Panathinaikos 4–2, UNICS Kazan, EA7 Emporio Armani 3-3, Fenerbahçe Ülker 2–4.
  - Group H:
    - Žalgiris Kaunas (Lithuania) 71–77 (Italy) Bennet Cantù
    - **FC Barcelona Regal** (Spain) 70–67 (Israel) **Maccabi Tel Aviv**
      - Standings: FC Barcelona Regal 6–0, Maccabi Tel Aviv, Bennet Cantù 3-3, Žalgiris Kaunas 0–6.

==== Football (soccer) ====
- 2014 FIFA World Cup qualification (AFC) Third round (teams in **bold** qualify for Fourth round):
  - Group A:
    - China 3–1 **Jordan**
    - **Iraq** 7–1 Singapore
      - Standings: Iraq 15 points, Jordan 12, China PR 9, Singapore 0.
  - Group B:
    - **South Korea** 2–0 Kuwait
    - United Arab Emirates 4–2 **Lebanon**
      - Standings: South Korea 13 points, Lebanon 10, Kuwait 8, United Arab Emirates 3.
  - Group C:
    - Tajikistan 1–1 North Korea
    - **Japan** 0–1 **Uzbekistan**
      - Standings: Uzbekistan 16 points, Japan 10, North Korea 7, Tajikistan 1.
  - Group D:
    - **Australia** 4–2 Saudi Arabia
    - **Oman** 2–0 Thailand
      - Standings: Australia 15 points, Oman 8, Saudi Arabia 6, Thailand 4.
  - Group E:
    - Bahrain 10–0 Indonesia
    - **Iran** 2–2 **Qatar**
      - Standings: Iran 12 points, Qatar 10, Bahrain 9, Indonesia 0.
- Friendly internationals (top 10 in FIFA World Rankings):
  - (1) Spain 5–0 Venezuela
  - (2) Germany 1–2 France
  - (5) England 2–3 (3) Netherlands
  - Romania 1–1 (4) Uruguay
  - Poland 0–0 (6) Portugal
  - (8) Italy 0–1 United States
  - (9) Croatia 1–3 Sweden
  - (10) Denmark 0–2 Russia

=== February 28, 2012 (Tuesday) ===
==== Football (soccer) ====
- Friendly internationals (top 10 in FIFA World Rankings): Bosnia and Herzegovina 1–2 (7) Brazil

=== February 26, 2012 (Sunday) ===
==== Basketball ====
- NBA All-Star Game in Orlando, Florida: West 152, East 149.
  - The West win back-to-back All-Star Games for the first time since winning three in succession between 2002 and 2004. Oklahoma City Thunder forward Kevin Durant is named as Most Valuable Player, after scoring 36 points.

==== Football (soccer) ====
- (England) League Cup Final in London:
  - Cardiff City 2–2 (a.e.t) (2–3 pen.) **Liverpool**
    - Liverpool win the League Cup for the 8th time and qualify for the UEFA Europa League.

==== Field hockey ====
- Men's Olympic Qualifying Tournament in New Delhi, India:
  - Fifth place game: Italy 5–0 Singapore
  - Third place game: Poland 3–4 Canada
  - Final: India 8–1 France
    - India qualifies for the Olympics.

==== Mixed martial arts ====
- UFC 144 in Saitama, Japan (USA unless stated):
  - Lightweight bout: **Anthony Pettis** def. Joe Lauzon via KO (head kick & punches)
  - Featherweight bout: **Hatsu Hioki** (JPN) def. Bart Palaszewski (POL) via unanimous decision (29–28, 30–27, 29–28)
  - Middleweight bout: **Tim Boetsch** def. Yushin Okami (JPN) via TKO (punches)
  - Welterweight bout: **Jake Shields** def. Yoshihiro Akiyama (JPN) via unanimous decision (30–27, 30–27, 30–27)
  - Heavyweight bout: **Mark Hunt** (NZL) def. Cheick Kongo (FRA) via TKO (punches)
  - Catchweight (211 lb) bout: **Ryan Bader** def. Quinton Jackson via unanimous decision (30–27, 30–27, 30–27)
  - Lightweight Championship bout: **Benson Henderson** def. Frankie Edgar (c) via unanimous decision (49–46, 48–47, 49–46)

==== Tennis ====
- ATP World Tour:
  - Regions Morgan Keegan Championships in Memphis, Tennessee:
    - Final: Jürgen Melzer (AUT) def. Milos Raonic (CAN) 7–5, 7–6 (4)
      - Melzer wins his fourth ATP Tour title.
  - Open 13 in Marseille, France:
    - Final: Juan Martín del Potro (ARG) def. Michaël Llodra (FRA) 6–4, 6–4
      - del Potro wins his tenth ATP Tour title.
  - Copa Claro in Buenos Aires, Argentina:
    - Final: David Ferrer (ESP) def. Nicolás Almagro (ESP) 4–6, 6–3, 6–2
      - Ferrer wins his second title of the year and 13th of his career.
- WTA Tour:
  - Dubai Tennis Championships in Dubai, United Arab Emirates:
    - Final: Agnieszka Radwańska (POL) def. Julia Görges (GER) 7–5, 6–4
      - Radwańska wins her first title of the year and 8th of her career.
  - Memphis International in Memphis, Tennessee:
    - Final: Sofia Arvidsson (SWE) def. Marina Erakovic (NZL) 6–3, 6–4
      - Arvidsson wins her second WTA Tour title, with her first title won at the same event six years ago.
  - Monterrey Open in Monterrey, Mexico:
    - Final: Tímea Babos (HUN) def. Alexandra Cadanțu (ROU) 6–4, 6–4
      - Babos wins her first WTA Tour title.

=== February 25, 2012 (Saturday) ===
==== Basketball ====
- NBA All-Star Weekend in Orlando, Florida:
  - Slam Dunk Contest winner: Jeremy Evans, Utah Jazz
  - Three-Point Shootout winner: Kevin Love, Minnesota Timberwolves
  - Skills Challenge winner: Tony Parker, San Antonio Spurs
  - Shooting Stars Competition winner: New York (Landry Fields, Cappie Pondexter and Allan Houston)

==== Field hockey ====
- Women's Olympic Qualifying Tournament in New Delhi, India:
  - Fifth place game: Canada 3–0 Poland
  - Third place game: Italy 2–1 Ukraine
  - Final: South Africa 3–1 India
    - South Africa qualifies for the Olympics.

=== February 24, 2012 (Friday) ===
==== Field hockey ====
- Men's Olympic Qualifying Tournament in New Delhi, India:
  - Italy 4–0 Singapore
  - France 1–1 Canada
  - India 4–2 Poland
    - Final standings: India 15 points, France 10, Poland 9, Canada 7, Italy 3, Singapore 0.
- Women's Olympic Qualifying Tournament in New Delhi, India:
  - Ukraine 1–0 Poland
  - South Africa 4–1 Canada
  - Italy 0–1 India
    - Final standings: South Africa 13 points, India 10, Italy 8, Ukraine 7, Canada 4, Poland 0.

=== February 23, 2012 (Thursday) ===
==== Basketball ====
- Euroleague Top 16, week 5 (teams in **bold** advance to quarterfinals):
  - Group F: Real Madrid (Spain) 86–65 (Spain) Unicaja
  - Group G:
    - Fenerbahçe Ülker (Turkey) 94–87 (Russia) UNICS Kazan
    - **Panathinaikos** (Greece) 58–67 (Italy) EA7 Emporio Armani
  - Group H:
    - **Maccabi Tel Aviv** (Israel) 70–66 (Lithuania) Žalgiris Kaunas
    - Bennet Cantù (Italy) 62–63 (Spain) **FC Barcelona Regal**

==== Football (soccer) ====
- UEFA Europa League Round of 32, second leg (first leg scores in parentheses):
  - **Athletic Bilbao** (Spain) 1–0 (1–2) (Russia) Lokomotiv Moscow. 2–2 on aggregate; Athletic Bilbao win on away goals.
  - **Valencia** (Spain) 1–0 (1–0) (England) Stoke City. Valencia win 2–0 on aggregate.
  - **Twente** (Netherlands) 1–0 (1–0) (Romania) Steaua București. Twente win 2–0 on aggregate.
  - **Standard Liège** (Belgium) 0–0 (1–1) (Poland) Wisła Kraków. 1–1 on aggregate; Standard Liège win on away goals.
  - PAOK (Greece) 0–3 (0–0) (Italy) **Udinese**. Udinese win 3–0 on aggregate.
  - **PSV Eindhoven** (Netherlands) 4–1 (2–1) (Turkey) Trabzonspor. PSV Eindhoven win 6–2 on aggregate.
  - Club Brugge (Belgium) 0–1 (1–2) (Germany) **Hannover 96**. Hannover 96 win 3–1 on aggregate.
  - **Manchester United** (England) 1–2 (2–0) (Netherlands) Ajax. Manchester United win 3–2 on aggregate.
  - **Metalist Kharkiv** (Ukraine) 4–1 (4–0) (Austria) Red Bull Salzburg. Metalist Kharkiv win 8–1 on aggregate.
  - **Olympiacos** (Greece) 1–0 (1–0) (Russia) Rubin Kazan. Olympiacos win 2–0 on aggregate.
  - Anderlecht (Belgium) 0–1 (0–1) (Netherlands) **AZ**. AZ win 2–0 on aggregate.
  - **Atlético Madrid** (Spain) 1–0 (3–1) (Italy) Lazio. Atlético Madrid win 4–1 on aggregate.
  - **Schalke 04** (Germany) 3–1 (a.e.t.) (1–1) (Czech Republic) Viktoria Plzeň. Schalke 04 win 4–2 on aggregate.
  - **Beşiktaş** (Turkey) 0–1 (2–0) (Portugal) Braga. Beşiktaş win 2–1 on aggregate.
  - **Sporting CP** (Portugal) 1–0 (2–2) (Poland) Legia Warsaw. Sporting CP win 3–2 on aggregate.
- Copa Libertadores second stage:
  - Group 1: The Strongest (Bolivia) 2–1 (Peru) Juan Aurich
  - Group 2: Olimpia (Paraguay) 2–1 (Argentina) Lanús
  - Group 3: Universidad Católica (Chile) 2–2 (Colombia) Junior

=== February 22, 2012 (Wednesday) ===
==== Basketball ====
- Euroleague Top 16, week 5:
  - Group E:
    - CSKA Moscow (Russia) 96–64 (Greece) Olympiacos
    - Galatasaray Medical Park (Turkey) 64–56 (Turkey) Anadolu Efes
  - Group F: Gescrap Bizkaia (Spain) 60–59 (Italy) Montepaschi Siena

==== Field hockey ====
- Men's Olympic Qualifying Tournament in New Delhi, India:
  - Poland 11–3 Singapore
  - Italy 0–3 France
  - Canada 2–3 India
- Women's Olympic Qualifying Tournament in New Delhi, India:
  - Ukraine 1–2 Italy
  - Canada 1–0 Poland
  - India 2–5 South Africa

==== Football (soccer) ====
- UEFA Champions League Round of 16, first leg:
  - Basel (Switzerland) 1–0 (Germany) Bayern Munich
  - Marseille (France) 1–0 (Italy) Internazionale
- UEFA Europa League Round of 32, second leg (first leg score in parentheses): **Manchester City** (England) 4–0 (2–1) (Portugal) Porto. Manchester City win 6–1 on aggregate.
- Copa Libertadores second stage:
  - Group 7: Vélez Sársfield (Argentina) 3–0 (Mexico) Guadalajara
  - Group 8: Universidad de Chile 5–1 (Argentina) Godoy Cruz
- Asian Olympics qualifiers preliminary round 3, matchday 5:
  - Group A:
    - Qatar 2–1 Saudi Arabia
    - Oman 0–3 South Korea
  - Group B: United Arab Emirates 1–0 Australia
  - Group C:
    - Bahrain 2–1 Syria
    - Malaysia 0–4 Japan

=== February 21, 2012 (Tuesday) ===
==== Field hockey ====
- Men's Olympic Qualifying Tournament in New Delhi, India:
  - Singapore 1–15 Canada
  - Poland 7–2 Italy
  - France 2–6 India
- Women's Olympic Qualifying Tournament in New Delhi, India:
  - Canada 2–5 Ukraine
  - Italy 1–1 South Africa
  - Poland 0–3 India

==== Football (soccer) ====
- UEFA Champions League Round of 16, first leg:
  - CSKA Moscow (Russia) 1–1 (Spain) Real Madrid
  - Napoli (Italy) 3–1 (England) Chelsea
- Copa Libertadores second stage:
  - Group 3: Bolívar (Bolivia) 1–3 (Chile) Unión Española
  - Group 4: Arsenal (Argentina) 3–0 (Venezuela) Zamora
  - Group 6: Cruz Azul (Mexico) 4–0 (Venezuela) Deportivo Táchira
  - Group 8: Peñarol (Uruguay) 0–4 (Colombia) Atlético Nacional
- Asian Olympics qualifiers preliminary round 3:
  - Group B: Iraq 2–1 Uzbekistan

=== February 19, 2012 (Sunday) ===
==== Basketball ====
- (Spain) Spanish Cup Final in Barcelona: FC Barcelona Regal 74–91 **Real Madrid**
  - Real Madrid win the Cup for the 23rd time.

==== Field hockey ====
- Men's Olympic Qualifying Tournament in New Delhi, India:
  - Canada 2–3 Poland
  - Singapore 0–9 France
  - India 8–1 Italy
- Women's Olympic Qualifying Tournament in New Delhi, India:
  - Poland 1–4 Italy
  - South Africa 2–0 Ukraine
  - India 4–1 Canada

==== Football (soccer) ====
- CAF Champions League preliminary round, first leg:
  - DFC8 (Central African Republic) 1–0 (Cameroon) Les Astres
  - Missile (Gabon) 3–2 (Ivory Coast) Africa Sports
  - AFAD Djékanou (Ivory Coast) 1–0 (Republic of the Congo) Diables Noirs
  - Orlando Pirates (South Africa) 1–3 (Angola) Recreativo do Libolo
  - Mafunzo (Zanzibar) 0–2 (Mozambique) Liga Muçulmana
  - CD Elá Nguema (Equatorial Guinea) 0–3 (Nigeria) Dolphins
  - LISCR (Liberia) 0–2 (Ghana) Berekum Chelsea
  - Green Mamba (Eswatini) 2–4 (Zimbabwe) FC Platinum
  - Japan Actuel's (Madagascar) 1–5 (Zambia) Power Dynamos
- CAF Confederation Cup preliminary round, first leg:
  - Dragons (Benin) 1–0 (Burkina Faso) Étoile Filante
  - AC Léopard (Republic of the Congo) 2–0 (Central African Republic) AS Tempête Mocaf
  - LLB Académic (Burundi) 3–0 (Equatorial Guinea) Atlético Semu
  - Renaissance FC (Chad) 2–0 (Niger) Sahel SC
  - GAMTEL (The Gambia) 1–0 (Senegal) Casa Sport

==== Golf ====
- PGA Tour:
  - Northern Trust Open in Pacific Palisades, Los Angeles:
    - Winner: Bill Haas (USA) 277 (−7)
      - Haas wins his fourth PGA Tour title.
- European Tour:
  - Avantha Masters in New Delhi, India:
    - Winner: Jbe' Kruger (ZAF) 274 (−14)
      - Kruger wins his first European Tour title.
- LPGA Tour:
  - Honda LPGA Thailand in Chonburi, Thailand:
    - Winner: Yani Tseng (ROC) 269 (−19)
      - Tseng wins her 13th LPGA Tour title.
- Champions Tour:
  - The ACE Group Classic in Naples, Florida:
    - Winner: Kenny Perry (USA) 196 (−20)
      - Perry wins his second Champions Tour title.

==== Tennis ====
- ATP World Tour:
  - ABN AMRO World Tennis Tournament in Rotterdam, Netherlands:
    - Final: Roger Federer (SWI) def. Juan Martín del Potro (ARG) 6–1, 6–4
      - Federer wins his 71st ATP Tour title.
  - SAP Open in San Jose, California:
    - Final: Milos Raonic (CAN) def. Denis Istomin (UZB) 7–6 (2), 6–2
      - Raonic wins his third ATP Tour title.
  - Brasil Open in São Paulo, Brazil:
    - Final: Nicolás Almagro (ESP) def. Filippo Volandri (ITA) 6–3, 4–6, 6–4
      - Almagro wins his eleventh career title.
- WTA Tour:
  - Qatar Total Open in Doha, Qatar:
    - Final: Victoria Azarenka (BLR) def. Samantha Stosur (AUS) 6–1, 6–2
      - Azarenka wins her third title of the year and eleventh of her career.
  - Copa Sony Ericsson Colsanitas in Bogotá, Colombia:
    - Final: Lara Arruabarrena-Vecino (ESP) def. Alexandra Panova (RUS) 6–2, 7–5
      - Arruabarrena-Vecino wins her first WTA Tour title.

=== February 18, 2012 (Saturday) ===
==== Auto racing ====
- Sprint Cup Series:
  - Budweiser Shootout: (1) Kyle Busch (USA) (Toyota) (2) Tony Stewart (USA) (Chevrolet) (3) Marcos Ambrose (AUS) (Ford)

==== Field hockey ====
- Men's Olympic Qualifying Tournament in New Delhi, India:
  - Canada 9–0 Italy
  - France 2–1 Poland
  - India 15–1 Singapore
- Women's Olympic Qualifying Tournament in New Delhi, India:
  - South Africa 2–1 Poland
  - Italy 2–2 Canada
  - India 1–1 Ukraine

==== Football (soccer) ====
- AFC Champions League qualifying play-off:
  - Esteghlal (Iran) 3–1 (Saudi Arabia) Al-Ettifaq
  - Al-Shabab (United Arab Emirates) 3–0 (Uzbekistan) Neftchi Farg'ona
  - Pohang Steelers (South Korea) 2–0 (Thailand) Chonburi
- OFC Champions League group stage, matchday 4:
  - Group A: Mont-Dore (New Caledonia) 0–1 (Fiji) Ba
  - Group B:
    - Auckland City (New Zealand) 7–3 (Solomon Islands) Koloale
    - Hekari United (Papua New Guinea) 2–0 (Vanuatu) Amicale
- CAF Champions League preliminary round, first leg:
  - ASFA Yennenga (Burkina Faso) 0–0 (Algeria) ASO Chlef
  - Young Africans (Tanzania) 1–1 (Egypt) Zamalek
  - Ports Authority (Sierra Leone) 0–0 (Guinea) Horoya AC
  - Foullah Edifice (Chad) 0–0 (Algeria) JSM Béjaïa
  - Tusker (Kenya) 0–0 (Rwanda) APR
  - Coin Nord (Comoros) 0–0 (Ethiopia) Ethiopian Coffee
  - ASGNN (Niger) 0–0 (Benin) Tonnerre
  - URA (Uganda) 3–0 Lesotho Correctional Services
  - Brikama United (The Gambia) 0–1 (Senegal) US Ouakam
- CAF Confederation Cup preliminary round, first leg:
  - Union Douala (Cameroon) 1–0 (Sierra Leone) FC Kallon
  - Black Leopards (South Africa) 1–1 (Zimbabwe) Motor Action
  - Red Arrows (Zambia) 0–0 (Eswatini) Royal Leopards
  - AS Mangasport (Gabon) 0–1 (Ethiopia) Saint-George SA
  - Kiyovu Sports (Rwanda) 1–1 (Tanzania) Simba
  - Ferroviário de Maputo (Mozambique) 3–0 (Kenya) Gor Mahia
  - Séwé Sports (Ivory Coast) 0–1 (Cameroon) Unisport Bafang
  - Extension Gunners (Botswana) 2–1 (Madagascar) TANA
  - Jamhuri (Zanzibar) 0–3 (Zimbabwe) Hwange

=== February 17, 2012 (Friday) ===
==== Football (soccer) ====
- OFC Champions League group stage, matchday 4:
  - Group A: Tefana (French Polynesia) 3–0 (New Zealand) Waitakere United

=== February 16, 2012 (Thursday) ===
==== Basketball ====
- (Israel) Israeli State Cup Final in Tel Aviv: **Maccabi Tel Aviv** 82–69 Maccabi Rishon LeZion
  - Maccabi Tel Aviv win the Cup for the third successive time and 39th time overall.

==== Football (soccer) ====
- UEFA Europa League Round of 32, first leg:
  - Lokomotiv Moscow (Russia) 2–1 (Spain) Athletic Bilbao
  - Red Bull Salzburg (Austria) 0–4 (Ukraine) Metalist Kharkiv
  - Ajax (Netherlands) 0–2 (England) Manchester United
  - Viktoria Plzeň (Czech Republic) 1–1 (Germany) Schalke 04
  - AZ (Netherlands) 1–0 (Belgium) Anderlecht
  - Lazio (Italy) 1–3 (Spain) Atlético Madrid
  - Legia Warsaw (Poland) 2–2 (Portugal) Sporting CP
  - Steaua București (Romania) 0–1 (Netherlands) Twente
  - Wisła Kraków (Poland) 1–1 (Belgium) Standard Liège
  - Udinese (Italy) 0–0 (Greece) PAOK
  - Trabzonspor (Turkey) 1–2 (Netherlands) PSV Eindhoven
  - Hannover 96 (Germany) 2–1 (Belgium) Club Brugge
  - Porto (Portugal) 1–2 (England) Manchester City
  - Stoke City (England) 0–1 (Spain) Valencia
- Copa Libertadores second stage:
  - Group 5: Nacional (Uruguay) 1–2 (Paraguay) Libertad
  - Group 8: Godoy Cruz (Argentina) 1–0 (Uruguay) Peñarol

=== February 15, 2012 (Wednesday) ===
==== Football (soccer) ====
- UEFA Champions League Round of 16, first leg:
  - Zenit St. Petersburg (Russia) 3–2 (Portugal) Benfica
  - Milan (Italy) 4–0 (England) Arsenal
- Copa Libertadores second stage:
  - Group 1: The Strongest (Bolivia) 2–1 (Brazil) Santos
  - Group 2: Lanús (Argentina) 1–1 (Brazil) Flamengo
  - Group 6: Deportivo Táchira (Venezuela) 1–1 (Brazil) Corinthians
- UEFA Women's Euro 2013 qualifying:
  - Group 1: Greece 2–3 Bosnia and Herzegovina
  - Group 2: Turkey 0–5 Germany
  - Group 3: Belgium 2–2 Northern Ireland
  - Group 7: Portugal 6–0 Armenia

==== Mixed martial arts ====
- UFC on Fuel TV: Sanchez vs. Ellenberger in Omaha, Nebraska, United States (USA unless stated):
  - Bantamweight bout: **Ivan Menjivar** (ESA) def. John Albert via submission (rear-naked choke)
  - Bantamweight bout: **T.J. Dillashaw** def. Walel Watson via unanimous decision (30–25, 30–25, 30–26)
  - Heavyweight bout: **Stipe Miocic** def. Philip De Fries (ENG) via KO (punches)
  - Middleweight bout: **Ronny Markes** (BRA) def. Aaron Simpson via split decision (29–28, 28–29, 29–28)
  - Heavyweight bout: **Stefan Struve** (NED) def. Dave Herman via TKO (punches)
  - Welterweight bout: **Jake Ellenberger** def. Diego Sanchez via unanimous decision (29–28, 29–28, 29–28)

==== Ski jumping ====
- World Cup in Klingenthal, Germany: Cancelled due to high winds.

=== February 14, 2012 (Tuesday) ===
==== Football (soccer) ====
- UEFA Champions League Round of 16, first leg:
  - Lyon (France) 1–0 (Cyprus) APOEL
  - Bayer Leverkusen (Germany) 1–3 (Spain) Barcelona
- UEFA Europa League Round of 32, first leg:
  - Rubin Kazan (Russia) 0–1 (Greece) Olympiacos
  - Braga (Portugal) 0–2 (Turkey) Beşiktaş
- Copa Libertadores second stage:
  - Group 4: Zamora (Venezuela) 0–0 (Argentina) Boca Juniors
  - Group 7: Defensor Sporting (Uruguay) 2–0 (Ecuador) Deportivo Quito
  - Group 8: Atlético Nacional (Colombia) 2–0 Universidad de Chile

=== February 12, 2012 (Sunday) ===
==== Alpine skiing ====
- Men's World Cup in Krasnaya Polyana, Russia:
  - Super combined: (1) Ivica Kostelić (CRO) (2) Beat Feuz (SWI) (3) Thomas Mermillod-Blondin (FRA)
    - Final standings: (1) Kostelić 336 points (2) Feuz 300 (3) Romed Baumann (AUT) 159
      - Kostelić defends his combined title, and wins his fifth career discipline title.
- Women's World Cup in Soldeu, Andorra:
  - Giant slalom: (1) Tessa Worley (FRA) (2) Tina Maze (SLO) (3) Maria Höfl-Riesch (GER)

==== Auto racing ====
- World Rally Championship:
  - Rally Sweden: (1) Jari-Matti Latvala (FIN)/Miikka Anttila (FIN) (Ford Fiesta RS WRC) (2) Mikko Hirvonen (FIN)/Jarmo Lehtinen (FIN) (Citroën DS3 WRC) (3) Mads Østberg (NOR)/Jonas Andersson (SWE) (Ford Fiesta RS WRC)

==== Biathlon ====
- World Cup 8 in Kontiolahti, Finland:
  - Men's 12.5 km Pursuit: (1) Ole Einar Bjørndalen (NOR) (2) Martin Fourcade (FRA) (3) Dmitry Malyshko (RUS)
  - Women's 10 km Pursuit: (1) Kaisa Mäkäräinen (FIN) (2) Magdalena Neuner (GER) (3) Darya Domracheva (BLR)

==== Football (soccer) ====
- Africa Cup of Nations in Equatorial Guinea and Gabon:
  - Final: (gold) **Zambia** 0–0 (8–7 pen.) (silver) Ivory Coast
    - Zambia win the title for the first time.

==== Golf ====
- PGA Tour:
  - AT&T Pebble Beach National Pro-Am in Pebble Beach, California:
    - Winner: Phil Mickelson (USA) 269 (−17)
      - Mickelson wins his 40th PGA Tour title.
- European Tour:
  - Dubai Desert Classic in Dubai, United Arab Emirates:
    - Winner: Rafael Cabrera-Bello (ESP) 270 (−18)
      - Cabrera-Bello wins his second European Tour title.
- LPGA Tour:
  - Women's Australian Open in Black Rock, Australia:
    - Winner: Jessica Korda (USA) 289 (−3)^{PO}
      - Korda wins her first LPGA Tour title, in a six-player playoff.
- Champions Tour:
  - Allianz Championship in Boca Raton, Florida:
    - Winner: Corey Pavin (USA)
      - Pavin wins his first Champions Tour title.

==== Rugby union ====
- Six Nations Championship, week 2: Wales 27–13 Scotland

==== Tennis ====
- Davis Cup
  - World Group, first round:
    - **Spain** 5–0 Kazakhstan
    - Russia 2–3 **Austria**
    - Canada 1–4 **France**
    - Switzerland 0–5 **United States**
    - **Czech Republic** 4–1 Italy
    - **Serbia** 4–1 Sweden
    - Japan 2–3 **Croatia**
    - Germany 1–4 **Argentina**
- WTA Tour:
  - Open GDF Suez in Paris, France:
    - Final: **Angelique Kerber** (GER) def. Marion Bartoli (FRA) 7–6 (3), 5–7, 6–3
      - Kerber wins her first WTA title.
  - PTT Pattaya Open in Pattaya, Thailand
    - Final: **Daniela Hantuchová** (FRA) def. Maria Kirilenko (RUS) 6–7 (4), 6–3, 6–3
      - Hantuchová wins the tournament for the second time, and his 5th career title.

=== February 11, 2012 (Saturday) ===
==== Alpine skiing ====
- Men's World Cup in Krasnaya Polyana, Russia:
  - Downhill: (1) Beat Feuz (SWI) (2) Benjamin Thomsen (CAN) (3) Adrien Théaux (FRA)
- Women's World Cup in Soldeu, Andorra:
  - Slalom: (1) Marlies Schild (AUT) (2) Frida Hansdotter (SWE) (3) Kathrin Zettel (AUT)

==== Biathlon ====
- World Cup 8 in Kontiolahti, Finland:
  - Men's 10 km Sprint: (1) Martin Fourcade (FRA) (2) Timofey Lapshin (RUS) (3) Benjamin Weger (SWI)
  - Women's 7.5 km Sprint: (1) Magdalena Neuner (GER) (2) Kaisa Mäkäräinen (FIN) (3) Darya Domracheva (BLR)

==== Bobsleigh ====
- Bobsleigh World Cup in Calgary, Canada:
  - Two-man: (1) Beat Hefti/Thomas Lamparter (SWI) (2) Manuel Machata/Andreas Bredau (GER) (3) Maximilian Arndt/Kevin Kuske (GER)
    - Final standings: (gold) Hefti 1695 points (silver) Arndt 1573 (bronze) Alexandr Zubkov (RUS) 1416
      - Hefti wins his second World Cup title.
  - Four-man: (1) Machata/Marko Huebenbecker/Bredau/Christian Poser (GER) (2) Arndt/Jan Speer/Kuske/Martin Putze (GER) (3) Zubkov/Filipp Yegorov/Dmitry Trunenkov/Maxim Mokrousov (RUS)
    - Final standings: (gold) Zubkov 1671 points (silver) Arndt 1606 (bronze) Machata 1574
      - Zubkov wins his record-equalling fourth World Cup title.
  - Two-woman: (1) Kaillie Humphries/Jennifer Ciochetti (CAN) (2) Anja Schneiderheinze-Stöckel/Lisette Thöne (GER) (3) Sandra Kiriasis/Petra Lammert (GER)
    - Final standings: (gold) Cathleen Martini (GER) 1655 (silver) Schneiderheinze-Stöckel 1598 (bronze) Kiriasis 1574
      - Kiriasis fails to win the World Cup for the first time since 2003.

==== Cross-country skiing ====
- World Cup in Nové Město na Moravě, Czech Republic:
  - Men's 30 km C Mass Start: (1) Johan Olsson (SWE) (2) Dario Cologna (SWI) (3) Maxim Vylegzhanin (RUS)
  - Women's 15 km C Mass Start: (1) Marit Bjørgen (NOR) (2) Justyna Kowalczyk (POL) (3) Therese Johaug (NOR)

==== Football (soccer) ====
- Africa Cup of Nations in Equatorial Guinea and Gabon:
  - Third place match: Ghana 0–2 (bronze) **Mali**

==== Futsal ====
- European Men's Championship in Zagreb, Croatia:
  - Bronze medal match: Croatia 1–3 (bronze) Italy
  - Final: (silver) Russia 1–3 (a.e.t.) (gold) **Spain**
    - Spain win the fourth successive title, and sixth overall.

==== Rugby union ====
- Six Nations Championship, week 2: Italy 15–19 England

=== February 10, 2012 (Friday) ===
==== Biathlon ====
- World Cup 8 in Kontiolahti, Finland:
  - Mixed 2x6+2x7.5 km Relay: (1) France (2) Ukraine (3) Slovakia

=== February 9, 2012 (Thursday) ===
==== Basketball ====
- Euroleague Top 16, matchday 4:
  - Group E: Galatasaray Medical Park (Turkey) 68–64 (Russia) CSKA Moscow
  - Group G: Panathinaikos (Greece) 72–62 (Turkey) Fenerbahçe Ülker
  - Group H:
    - Žalgiris Kaunas (Lithuania) 58–67 (Spain) FC Barcelona Regal
    - Maccabi Tel Aviv (Israel) 75–60 (Italy) Bennet Cantù

==== Football (soccer) ====
- Copa Libertadores second stage:
  - Group 1: Internacional (Brazil) 2–0 (Peru) Juan Aurich
  - Group 2: Emelec (Ecuador) 1–0 (Paraguay) Olimpia
  - Group 3: Universidad Católica (Chile) 1–1 (Bolivia) Bolívar
  - Group 5: Libertad (Paraguay) 4–1 (Peru) Alianza Lima

==== Futsal ====
- European Men's Championship in Zagreb, Croatia:
  - Semi-finals:
    - Croatia 2–4 Russia
    - Spain 1–0 Italy

=== February 8, 2012 (Wednesday) ===
==== Basketball ====
- Euroleague Top 16, matchday 4:
  - Group E: Anadolu Efes (Turkey) 65–67 (Greece) Olympiacos
  - Group F:
    - Montepaschi Siena (Italy) 84–69 (Spain) Unicaja
    - Gescrap Bizkaia (Spain) 93–69 (Spain) Real Madrid
  - Group G: EA7 Emporio Armani (Italy) 63–58 (Russia) UNICS Kazan

==== Football (soccer) ====
- Africa Cup of Nations in Equatorial Guinea and Gabon:
  - Semifinals:
    - In Bata: **Zambia** 1–0 Ghana
    - In Libreville: Mali 0–1 **Ivory Coast**
- Copa Libertadores second stage:
  - Group 3: Unión Española (Chile) 2–0 (Colombia) Junior
  - Group 5: Vasco da Gama (Brazil) 1–2 (Uruguay) Nacional
  - Group 6: Nacional (Paraguay) 1–2 (Mexico) Cruz Azul

==== Snowboarding ====
- World Cup in Blue Mountain, Canada:
  - Snowboard cross men: (1) Pierre Vaultier (FRA) (2) David Speiser (GER) (3) Nick Baumgartner (USA)
  - Snowboard cross women: (1) Dominique Maltais (CAN) (2) Aleksandra Zhekova (BUL) (3) Maelle Ricker (CAN)

=== February 7, 2012 (Tuesday) ===
==== Baseball ====
- Caribbean Series in Santo Domingo, Dominican Republic:
  - (Venezuela) Tigres de Aragua 6, (Mexico) Yaquis de Obregón 2
  - (Puerto Rico) Indios de Mayagüez 3, (Dominican Republic) Leones del Escogido 1
    - Final standings: Leones del Escogido 4–2, Indios de Mayagüez, Tigres de Aragua 3–3, Yaquis de Obregón 2–4.
      - The Leones win the Caribbean Series for the first time since 2010, and the fourth time overall.

==== Football (soccer) ====
- Copa Libertadores second stage:
  - Group 4: Fluminense (Brazil) 1–0 (Argentina) Arsenal
  - Group 7:
    - Defensor Sporting (Uruguay) 0–3 (Argentina) Vélez Sársfield
    - Guadalajara (Mexico) 1–1 (Ecuador) Deportivo Quito

==== Futsal ====
- European Men's Championship in Croatia:
  - Quarter-finals:
    - In Split: **Russia** 2–1 Serbia
    - In Zagreb: **Italy** 3–1 Portugal

=== February 6, 2012 (Monday) ===
==== Baseball ====
- Caribbean Series in Santo Domingo, Dominican Republic:
  - (Puerto Rico) Indios de Mayagüez 4, (Mexico) Yaquis de Obregón 3
  - (Venezuela) Tigres de Aragua 7, (Dominican Republic) Leones del Escogido 0

==== Futsal ====
- European Men's Championship in Croatia:
  - Quarter-finals:
    - In Zagreb: Romania 3–8 **Spain**
    - In Split: **Croatia** 1–1 (3–1 pen.) Ukraine

=== February 5, 2012 (Sunday) ===
==== American football ====
- Super Bowl XLVI: **New York Giants** 21–17 New England Patriots
  - New York Giants win the Super Bowl for the fourth time, and first since defeating the Patriots in Super Bowl XLII.

==== Baseball ====
- Caribbean Series in Santo Domingo, Dominican Republic:
  - (Venezuela) Tigres de Aragua 7, (Puerto Rico) Indios de Mayagüez 0
  - (Dominican Republic) Leones del Escogido 2, (Mexico) Yaquis de Obregón 0

==== Football (soccer) ====
- Africa Cup of Nations in Equatorial Guinea and Gabon:
  - Quarterfinals:
    - In Libreville: Gabon 1–1 (4–5 pen.) **Mali**
    - In Franceville: **Ghana** 2–1 (a.e.t.) Tunisia

==== Futsal ====
- European Men's Championship in Croatia (teams in **bold** advance to the quarter-finals):
  - Group C in Split: **Russia** 2–2 **Italy**
    - Standings: Russia, Italy 4 points, Turkey 0.
  - Group D in Zagreb: **Serbia** 1–2 **Portugal**
    - Standings: Portugal 6 points, Serbia 3, Azerbaijan 0.

==== Handball ====
- Asian Men's Championship in Jeddah, Saudi Arabia:
  - Bronze medal game: (bronze) **Saudi Arabia** 25–21 Japan
  - Final: (gold) **South Korea** 23–22 (silver) Qatar
    - South Korea win the title for the ninth time.

==== Tennis ====
- Open Sud de France in Montpellier, France:
  - Final: **Tomáš Berdych** (CZE) def. Gaël Monfils (FRA) 6–2, 4–6, 6–3
    - Berdych wins his seventh ATP Tour title.
- PBZ Zagreb Indoors in Zagreb, Croatia:
  - Final: **Mikhail Youzhny** (RUS) def. Lukáš Lacko (SVK) 6–2, 6–3
    - Youzhny wins his eighth ATP Tour title.
- VTR Open in Viña del Mar, Chile:
  - Final: **Juan Mónaco** (ARG) def. Carlos Berlocq (ARG) 6–3, 6–7(1), 6–1
    - Mónaco wins his fourth ATP Tour title, and first since 2007.

=== February 4, 2012 (Saturday) ===
==== Baseball ====
- Caribbean Series in Santo Domingo, Dominican Republic:
  - (Mexico) Yaquis de Obregón 4, (Venezuela) Tigres de Aragua 2
  - (Dominican Republic) Leones del Escogido 6, (Puerto Rico) Indios de Mayagüez 1

==== Equestrianism ====
- Show jumping – World Cup, Western European League:
  - 11th competition in Bordeaux: (gold) Kevin Staut (FRA) on Silvana (silver) Edwina Tops-Alexander (AUS) on Itot du Château (bronze) Rik Hemeryck (BEL) on Quarco de Kerambars
- Combined driving – World Cup:
  - World Cup Final in Bordeaux: (gold) Boyd Exell (AUS) (silver) IJsbrand Chardon (NED) (bronze) Koos de Ronde (NED)

==== Football (soccer) ====
- Africa Cup of Nations in Equatorial Guinea and Gabon:
  - Quarterfinals:
    - In Bata: **Zambia** 3–0 Sudan
    - In Malabo: **Ivory Coast** 3–0 Equatorial Guinea

==== Futsal ====
- European Men's Championship in Croatia (teams in **bold** advance to the quarter-finals):
  - Group A in Split: Czech Republic 4–5 **Croatia**
    - Standings: Croatia 6 points, **Romania** 3, Czech Republic 0.
  - Group B in Zagreb: **Ukraine** 1–4 **Spain**
    - Standings: Spain 6 points, Ukraine 3, Slovenia 0.

==== Mixed martial arts ====
- UFC 143 in Las Vegas, United States (USA unless stated):
  - Middleweight bout: **Ed Herman** def. Clifford Starks via submission (rear-naked choke)
  - Bantamweight bout: **Renan Barão** (BRA) def. Scott Jorgensen via unanimous decision (30–27, 30–27, 30–27)
  - Welterweight bout: **Josh Koscheck** def. Mike Pierce via split decision (28–29, 29–28, 29–28)
  - Heavyweight bout: **Fabrício Werdum** (BRA) def. Roy Nelson via unanimous decision (30–27, 30–27, 30–27)
  - Interim Welterweight Championship bout: **Carlos Condit** def. Nick Diaz via unanimous decision (48–47, 49–46, 49–46)

=== February 3, 2012 (Friday) ===
==== Baseball ====
- Caribbean Series in Santo Domingo, Dominican Republic:
  - (Mexico) Yaquis de Obregón 2, (Puerto Rico) Indios de Mayagüez 0
  - (Dominican Republic) Leones del Escogido 5, (Venezuela) Tigres de Aragua 2 (F/13)

==== Cricket ====
- India in Australia:
  - 2nd T20I in Melbourne:
    - Australia 131 (19.4 overs); India 135/2 (19.4 overs). **India win by 8 wickets (with 2 balls remaining).**

==== Futsal ====
- European Men's Championship in Croatia:
  - Group C in Split: Turkey 0–5 Russia
  - Group D in Zagreb: Azerbaijan 8–9 Serbia

==== Handball ====
- Asian Men's Championship in Jeddah, Saudi Arabia:
  - Semifinals:
    - **South Korea** 27–26 Saudi Arabia
    - **Qatar** 33–28 Japan

=== February 2, 2012 (Thursday) ===
==== Baseball ====
- Caribbean Series in Santo Domingo, Dominican Republic:
  - (Puerto Rico) Indios de Mayagüez 3, (Venezuela) Tigres de Aragua 1
  - (Dominican Republic) Leones del Escogido 2, (Mexico) Yaquis de Obregón 1

==== Basketball ====
- Euroleague Top 16 matchday 3:
  - Group E: CSKA Moscow (Russia) 85–70 (Turkey) Galatasaray Medical Park
  - Group F: Unicaja (Spain) 68–91 (Italy) Montepaschi Siena
  - Group G: Fenerbahçe Ülker (Turkey) 56–77 (Greece) Panathinaikos
  - Group H:
    - Bennet Cantù (Italy) 82–74 (Israel) Maccabi Tel Aviv
    - FC Barcelona Regal (Spain) 94–80 (Lithuania) Žalgiris Kaunas

==== Football (soccer) ====
- Copa Libertadores First Stage, second leg (teams in **bold** advance to the Second stage):
  - Caracas (Venezuela) 1–1 (Uruguay) **Peñarol**. Peñarol win 4–1 on points.
  - UANL (Mexico) 2–2 (Chile) **Unión Española**. Unión Española win 4–1 on points.

==== Futsal ====
- European Men's Championship in Croatia:
  - Group A in Split: Romania 3–1 Czech Republic
  - Group B in Zagreb: Slovenia 3–6 Ukraine

=== February 1, 2012 (Wednesday) ===
==== Basketball ====
- Euroleague Top 16 matchday 3:
  - Group E: Olympiacos (Greece) 83–65 (Turkey) Anadolu Efes
  - Group F: Real Madrid (Spain) 89–73 (Spain) Gescrap Bizkaia
  - Group G: UNICS Kazan (Russia) 59–44 (Italy) EA7 Emporio Armani

==== Cricket ====
- India in Australia:
  - 1st T20I in Sydney:
    - Australia 171/4 (20 overs); India 140/6 (20 overs). **Australia win by 31 runs.**

==== Football (soccer) ====
- Africa Cup of Nations in Equatorial Guinea and Gabon (teams in **bold** advance to the quarterfinals):
  - Group D:
    - Botswana 1–2 **Mali**
    - **Ghana** 1–1 Guinea
- Copa Libertadores First Stage, second leg (teams in **bold** advance to the Second stage):
  - **Flamengo** (Brazil) 2–0 (Bolivia) Real Potosí. 3–3 on points; Flamengo win 3–2 on aggregate.
  - Once Caldas (Colombia) 2–2 (Brazil) **Internacional**. Internacional win 4–1 on points.

==== Futsal ====
- European Men's Championship in Croatia:
  - Group C in Split: Italy 3–1 Turkey
  - Group D in Zagreb: Portugal 4–1 Azerbaijan

==== Handball ====
- Asian Men's Championship in Jeddah, Saudi Arabia (teams in **bold** advance to the semifinals):
  - Group A:
    - **South Korea** 28–27 **Japan**
    - Jordan 28–31 Kuwait
  - Group B: Bahrain 29–30 United Arab Emirates
