= Golf at the 2025 SEA Games – Women's team =

Golf competition at the 2025 SEA Games

Golf – Women's team at the 2025 SEA Games
- Venue: Siam Country Club Rolling Hills
- Date: 11 December 2025 – 14 December 2025
- Competitors: 21 from 7 nations
- Winning time: 558

Medalists
gold medal	Kritchanya Kaopattanaskul; Prim Prachnakorn; Pimpisa Rubrong	Thailand
silver medal	Valencia Chang Xin Ru; Chen Xingtong; Inez Ng Xin Yi	Singapore
bronze medal	Bianca Naomi Amina Laksono; Sania Talita Wahyudi; Elaine Widjaja	Indonesia

The women's team golf competition at the 2025 SEA Games was held from 11 to 14 December 2025 at the Siam Country Club Rolling Hills course in Chonburi, Thailand.

Thailand won the gold medal with a 72-hole team total of 558. Singapore won the silver medal with a total of 593, while Indonesia won the bronze medal with a total of 595.

== Competition format ==
The women's team event was contested over 72 holes of stroke play, with one round of 18 holes played each day. Each national team consisted of two or three golfers. For each round, the best two individual scores from each team were counted towards the team score, while the highest score was discarded. The team with the lowest aggregate score after four rounds won the event. If teams were tied for a medal position, the tie was to be decided by a hole-by-hole play-off.

== Schedule ==
All times are Thailand Standard Time (UTC+07:00)

Date	Time	Event
Thursday, 11 December 2025	08:00	Round 1
Friday, 12 December 2025	08:00	Round 2
Saturday, 13 December 2025	08:00	Round 3
Sunday, 14 December 2025	08:00	Round 4

== Results ==
Rank	Team	Round				Total	To par
Rank	Team	1	2	3	4	Total	To par
1st place, gold medalist(s)	Thailand	142	141	141	134	558	−18
	Prim Prachnakorn	72	71	70	66		
	Kritchanya Kaopattanaskul	70	70	71	~~74~~		
	Pimpisa Rubrong	~~76~~	~~73~~	~~71~~	68		
2nd place, silver medalist(s)	Singapore	144	146	153	150	593	+17
	Inez Ng Xin Yi	71	~~76~~	76	75		
	Chen Xingtong	~~75~~	72	77	75		
	Valencia Chang Xin Ru	73	74	~~77~~	~~79~~		
3rd place, bronze medalist(s)	Indonesia	151	154	148	142	595	+19
	Elaine Widjaja	75	~~79~~	72	70		
	Sania Talita Wahyudi	76	75	76	~~76~~		
	Bianca Naomi Amina Laksono	~~80~~	82	~~79~~	72		
4	Philippines	149	156	150	141	596	+20
	Rianne Mikhaela Malixi	70	79	~~78~~	70		
	Junia Louise Gabasa	79	77	73	~~77~~		
	Grace Pauline Quintanilla	~~82~~	~~79~~	77	71		
5	Laos	154	155	148	153	610	+34
	Malisone Chanthapanya	74	78	73	~~79~~		
	Vunnisa Vu	80	77	75	75		
	Ashley Han	~~90~~	~~82~~	~~80~~	78		
6	Malaysia	159	156	150	151	616	+40
	Maisarah Muhammad Hezri	80	78	76	71		
	Charlayne Shin Ling Chong	~~84~~	78	74	80		
	Pang Hee Jie	79	~~78~~	~~80~~	~~81~~		
7	Vietnam	157	145	156	158	616	+40
	Lê Chúc An	76	68	75	74		
	Lê Nguyễn Minh Anh	81	~~80~~	81	84		
	Nguyễn Việt Gia Hân	~~82~~	77	~~86~~	~~87~~		

Scores shown with strikethrough were discarded from the team total for that round.
