= Golf at the 2025 SEA Games – Women's individual =

Golf competition at the 2025 SEA Games

Golf – Women's individual at the 2025 SEA Games
- Venue: Siam Country Club Rolling Hills
- Date: 11 December 2025 – 14 December 2025
- Competitors: 21 from 7 nations

Medalists
gold medal	Prim Prachnakorn	Thailand
silver medal	Kritchanya Kaopattanaskul	Thailand
bronze medal	Lê Chúc An	Vietnam

The women's individual golf competition at the 2025 SEA Games was held from 11 to 14 December 2025 at the Siam Country Club Rolling Hills course in Chonburi, Thailand.

Thailand's Prim Prachnakorn won the gold medal with a 72-hole total of 279, nine-under-par. Her teammate Kritchanya Kaopattanaskul won the silver medal with a total of 285, while Vietnam's Lê Chúc An was awarded the bronze medal. Although Pimpisa Rubrong recorded the third-lowest total score, Lê received the bronze medal because a national organisation could not win more than two medals in an individual event.

== Schedule ==
All times are Thailand Standard Time (UTC+07:00)

Date	Time	Event
Thursday, 11 December 2025	08:00	Round 1
Friday, 12 December 2025	08:00	Round 2
Saturday, 13 December 2025	08:00	Round 3
Sunday, 14 December 2025	08:00	Round 4

== Results ==
Rank	Athlete	Round				Total	To par
Rank	Athlete	1	2	3	4	Total	To par
1st place, gold medalist(s)	Prim Prachnakorn (THA)	72	71	70	66	279	−9
2nd place, silver medalist(s)	Kritchanya Kaopattanaskul (THA)	70	70	71	74	285	−3
3rd place, bronze medalist(s)	Lê Chúc An (VIE)	76	68	75	74	293	+5
4 (Note: Rubrong recorded the third-lowest total score, but was not awarded the bronze medal because each national organisation was limited to a maximum of two medals in an individual event.)	Pimpisa Rubrong (THA)	76	73	71	68	288	E
5	Elaine Widjaja (INA)	75	79	72	70	296	+8
6	Rianne Mikhaela Malixi (PHI)	70	79	78	70	297	+9
7	Inez Ng Xin Yi (SGP)	71	76	76	75	298	+10
8	Chen Xingtong (SGP)	75	72	77	75	299	+11
T9	Valencia Chang Xin Ru (SGP)	73	74	77	79	303	+15
T9	Sania Talita Wahyudi (INA)	76	75	76	76	303	+15
11	Malisone Chanthapanya (LAO)	74	78	73	79	304	+16
12	Maisarah Muhammad Hezri (MAS)	80	78	76	71	305	+17
13	Junia Louise Gabasa (PHI)	79	77	73	77	306	+18
14	Vunnisa Vu (LAO)	80	77	75	75	307	+19
15	Grace Pauline Quintanilla (PHI)	82	79	77	71	309	+21
16	Bianca Naomi Amina Laksono (INA)	80	82	79	72	313	+25
17	Charlayne Shin Ling Chong (MAS)	84	78	74	80	316	+28
18	Pang Hee Jie (MAS)	79	78	80	81	318	+30
19	Lê Nguyễn Minh Anh (VIE)	76	68	75	84	303	+15
20	Ashley Han (LAO)	90	82	80	78	330	+42
21	Nguyễn Việt Gia Hân (VIE)	82	77	86	87	332	+44
