= Golf at the 2025 SEA Games – Men's team =

Golf – Men's team at the 2025 SEA Games
- Venue: Siam Country Club Rolling Hills
- Date: 11 December 2025 – 14 December 2025
- Competitors: 32 from 8 nations
- Winning time: 831

Medalists
gold medal	Warut Boonrod; Thanawin Lee; Pongsapak Laopakdee; Parin Sarasmut	Thailand
silver medal	Mohamad Randy Arbenata Bintang; Abdul Latief Rayhan; Amadeus Christian Susanto; Kenneth Henson Sutianto	Indonesia
bronze medal	Hồ Anh Huy; Nguyễn Anh Minh; Nguyễn Trọng Hoàng; Nguyễn Tuấn Anh	Vietnam

The men's team golf competition at the 2025 SEA Games was held from 11 to 14 December 2025 at the Siam Country Club Rolling Hills course in Chonburi, Thailand.

Thailand won the gold medal with a 72-hole team total of 831. Indonesia won the silver medal with a total of 851, while Vietnam won the bronze medal with a total of 857.

== Competition format ==
The men's team event was contested over 72 holes of stroke play, with one round of 18 holes played each day. Each national team consisted of three or four golfers. For each round, the best three individual scores from each team were counted towards the team score, while the highest score was discarded. The team with the lowest aggregate score after four rounds won the event.

If teams were tied for a medal position, the tie was to be decided by a hole-by-hole play-off.

== Schedule ==
All times are Thailand Standard Time (UTC+07:00)

Date	Time	Event
Thursday, 11 December 2025	08:00	Round 1
Friday, 12 December 2025	08:00	Round 2
Saturday, 13 December 2025	08:00	Round 3
Sunday, 14 December 2025	08:00	Round 4

== Results ==
Rank	Team	Round				Total	To par
Rank	Team	1	2	3	4	Total	To par
1st place, gold medalist(s)	Thailand	214	199	208	210	831	−33
	Pongsapak Laopakdee	65	66	66	70		
	Parin Sarasmut	73	64	71	72		
	Thanawin Lee	76	69	71	68		
	Warut Boonrod	~~76~~	~~76~~	~~76~~	~~75~~		
2nd place, silver medalist(s)	Indonesia	219	205	209	218	851	−13
	Mohamad Randy Arbenata Bintang	~~76~~	70	65	70		
	Abdul Latief Rayhan	73	66	72	~~76~~		
	Amadeus Christian Susanto	71	69	~~73~~	75		
	Kenneth Henson Sutianto	75	~~72~~	72	73		
3rd place, bronze medalist(s)	Vietnam	214	217	212	214	857	−7
	Nguyễn Anh Minh	71	70	67	70		
	Hồ Anh Huy	68	73	~~76~~	~~76~~		
	Nguyễn Tuấn Anh	75	74	72	70		
	Nguyễn Trọng Hoàng	~~76~~	~~78~~	73	74		
4	Singapore	217	215	223	223	878	+14
	Troy Tian Storm	71	71	75	73		
	Brayden Lee	76	73	73	75		
	Justin Zheng Zhong Kuk	70	71	~~78~~	~~79~~		
	Sean Lee	~~79~~	~~75~~	75	75		
5	Malaysia	219	216	219	225	879	+15
	Muhammad Hezri Muhammad Hariz	74	71	73	76		
	Anson Boon Xiang Yeo	~~78~~	71	73	73		
	Mohd Firdaus Zubair	73	74	73	76		
	Justin Mann Shen Chan	72	~~76~~	~~76~~	~~78~~		
6	Philippines	221	218	216	228	883	+19
	Rolando Bregente	65	73	74	72		
	Chris Jhon Remata	78	70	69	80		
	Perry Josef Bucay	78	75	73	76		
	Shinichi Suzuki	~~78~~	~~82~~	~~77~~	RTD		
7	Myanmar	232	231	223	225	911	+47
	Kaung Htike Zaw	76	78	70	71		
	Zin Hein Naing	~~83~~	72	78	77		
	Min Sitt Thway	79	81	~~81~~	77		
	Kyaw Ko Ko Chit	77	~~85~~	75	~~83~~		
8	Laos	232	236	229	228	925	+61
	Brandon Le Yabandith	75	78	72	75		
	Sinxay Philasouk	75	78	78	77		
	Khaophone Inthilat	82	80	79	76		
	Vasin Manibanseng	~~87~~	~~83~~	~~84~~	~~80~~		

Scores shown with strikethrough were discarded from the team total for that round.
