= Nicolò Melli =

Italian basketball player (born 1991)

- Melli with Fenerbahçe in 2026

No. 4 – Fenerbahçe
- Position: Power forward / centre
- League: BSL; EuroLeague

Personal information
- Born: 26 January 1991 (age 35) Reggio Emilia, Italy
- Listed height: 2.05 m (6 ft 9 in)
- Listed weight: 110 kg (243 lb)

Career information
- NBA draft: 2013: undrafted
- Playing career: 2007–present

Career history
- 2007–2010: Reggiana
- 2010–2015: Olimpia Milano
- 2011: →Pesaro
- 2015–2017: Brose Bamberg
- 2017–2019: Fenerbahçe
- 2019–2021: New Orleans Pelicans
- 2021: Dallas Mavericks
- 2021–2024: Olimpia Milano
- 2024–present: Fenerbahçe

Career highlights
- EuroLeague champion (2025); EuroLeague Finals Top Scorer (2018); All-EuroLeague Second Team (2017); 3× Turkish Super League champion (2018, 2025, 2026); 3× Turkish Cup winner (2019, 2025, 2026); 2× Turkish Super Cup winner (2025, 2026); 2× German Bundesliga champion (2016, 2017); German Cup winner (2017); 2× All-German Bundesliga First Team (2016, 2017); 4× Lega Serie A champion (2014, 2022–2024); Italian Cup winner (2022); 2× All-Lega Serie A Team (2022, 2023); 3× Italian All-Star (2011–2013)
- Stats at NBA.com
- Stats at Basketball Reference
Medals
Men's basketball
Representing Italy
European U-20 Championship
Silver medal – second place	2011 Spain

Nicolò Melli (born 26 January 1991) is an Italian professional basketball player for Fenerbahçe of the Turkish Basketbol Süper Ligi (BSL) and the EuroLeague. He also represents the senior Italian national team. He mainly plays at the power forward position, but he has also played at center, sometimes even a small forward. Melli earned an All-EuroLeague Second Team selection in 2017.

== Youth career ==
The Reggio Emilia native started his career with home town side Pallacanestro Reggiana. After an accumulation of injuries Melli was called up to train with the senior team in October 2004, at only 13. He sat on the bench during a 24 October league game (an age record) though he did not play and returned to the youth teams afterwards.

In October 2006 he participated in the Italian leg of the Jordan Classic Camp international tour, regrouping a selection of the thirty most promising under-16 players, with the MVP earning a trip to the American edition of the camp. Melli was selected as co-MVP, meeting Michael Jordan and going to the U.S. in April 2007. He talked of recruiting interest from American college UCLA during the same period.

== Professional career ==
=== Pallacanestro Reggiana (2007–2010) ===
In August 2007, he signed a five-year professional contract with Pallacanestro Reggiana and started training with the first team. The same year, in October, the 16-year-old debuted in the Italian national second division LegaDue. In May 2008, during the promotion semi-finals against Aurora Basket Jesi, he replaced injured starter Benjamin Ortner and contributed 16 points and 15 rebounds in a losing effort. He finished the season playing an average of 10.6 minutes with 3.4 points and 2.9 rebounds.

During the off-season, the 17-year-old participated in the Reebok Eurocamp in Treviso but did not make an impression on observers (albeit playing against older players, sometimes by five years). He also returned to the U.S., attending the Adidas Nations that pitted international teams of promising youngsters. Though he was praised by an observer for his work ethic, it was also noted that his game (and lack of athleticism) was unsuited to the American game.

Melli started the next season in great form, with 12 points and 18 rebounds followed by 24 points in two games, however, on 21 December 2008, Melli suffered a serious knee injury. Scans revealed an anterior cruciate ligament injury on his left knee, requiring surgery and at least five months of rehabilitation though he would be able to continue his career.

He returned to action in 2009–10 as a starter; he averaged 10.7 points and 7.1 rebounds in 28 minutes, though he missed the promotion playoffs because of a shoulder injury.

=== Olimpia Milano (2010–2015) ===
==== 2010–11 season ====
On the radar of strong sides for some time, Melli joined Armani Jeans Milano, of the elite domestic Serie A and European EuroLeague in July 2010, signing a four-year deal. After struggling to earn minutes, Melli was loaned to fellow Serie A side Scavolini-Siviglia Pesaro in February 2011. A month later he returned to Milan, to take part in the Italian All Star Game where he contributed 12 points for Italy. Melli finished the 2010–11 season with 3.8 points, 3.3 rebounds and 1.1 steals in 16 minutes per game for Pesaro (compared with 9 minutes for Milan previously).

==== 2011–12 season ====
The next season saw Melli accrue slightly more playing time but despite some highlights, such as a team-high 17 points in a EuroLeague Group G defeat against UNICS Kazan, he finished the regular season with 3.4 points and 2.7 rebounds in 11 minutes per game (Serie A) and 3.8 points and 1.9 rebounds in 9 minutes per game (EuroLeague). He had more impact in the Serie A playoffs, including decisive performances in the semi-final game 3 against former side Pesaro (5 points in 19 minutes and a good defensive performance, with 7 rebounds, 2 steals and 1 block) and then in game 4 of the finals against future champions Montepaschi Siena where he was part of a second-half fightback to win the game, finishing with 11 points and 4 rebounds in 13 minutes.

==== 2012–13 season ====
In 2012–13, Melli increased his averages to 5.8 points and 4.1 rebounds (Serie A), 4.6 points and 3 rebounds (EuroLeague), and his minutes to respectively 17 and 15 in a season nearly devoid of highlights both personally and for Milan (eliminated in the domestic quarterfinals and the EuroLeague regular season). An exception was his third successive participation in the December Italian league All-Star Game, in which he top-scored along with Milan teammate Alessandro Gentile (18 points), adding a game-best 10 rebounds. During the summer, he worked out with a number of NBA sides, with an observer commenting that he seemed too light physically for the league, he would go undrafted in the 2013 NBA draft.

==== 2013–14 season ====
2013–14 proved to be Melli's breakthrough season, with his good performances becoming more regular as he cemented his place in Milan's starting five. The first of those decisive contributions came in Milan's second EuroLeague game of the season against Žalgiris, where Melli scored a career-high 20 points, adding 9 rebounds and 2 steals in 25 minutes to earn a PIR of 28. During the decisive 74–73 victory against Brose Bamberg in the penultimate group stage game, he defended Wright as he missed the Brose's last shot which allowed Milan to progress to the Top 16. Though he lad less impact further on as Milan reached the EuroLeague quarterfinals, Melli finished with respectable averages of 5.3 points, 4.3 rebounds, 0.8 assists and 0.9 steals in around 21 minutes in the competition.

Domestically, he regularly posted scored in double figures, including a career-high 24 points against Roma, put against more average games he finished with 6.9 points and 4.9 rebounds in a career-high 21 minutes. Discarding the statistics, Melli had crucial contributions during the Serie A playoffs, starting with 18 points in 22 minutes in the first game against Pistoia. After starting the finals series against defending champions Montepaschi Siena with some off-games Melli exploded in the final two games. In the do-or-die game 6, with Milan trailing, he scored two successive three-pointers to regain the lead before adding a steal and a number of decisive rebounds as Milan won the game to earn a game 7 decider. In that game, he contributed 11 points and a career-high 13 rebounds as Milan won to become Italian champions for the first time in 18 years.

==== 2014–15 season ====
In July 2014, his contract with Milan was extended for another year. The season proved more difficult for both parties, Melli had an unremarkable season (5.3 points and 3.5 rebounds in the EuroLeague, 5.6 and 4.3 in Serie A) as Milan were stopped in the Italian playoff semi-finals in their title defense and stalled in the EuroLeague Top 16.

=== Brose Bamberg (2015–2017) ===
Melli moved abroad in July 2015, signing with German side Brose Bamberg for two years. He cited Brose's strong pursuit of his services and their offering him a more important role in the side as motivation for the move abroad, adding that the presence of compatriots Andrea Trinchieri and Daniele Baiesi as head coach and GM respectively would facilitate his adaptation. Melli was named the MVP of the Month of November of the 2015–16 Euroleague.

Melli was named the EuroLeague Round 11 MVP, after scoring 27 points and grabbing 14 rebounds, in a 70–85 away victory over Maccabi Tel Aviv, on 8 December 2016. He was named to the season's All-EuroLeague Second Team.

=== Fenerbahçe (2017–2019) ===
On 8 July 2017, Melli signed a three-year contract with Turkish club Fenerbahçe. In the 2017–18 EuroLeague season, Fenerbahçe made it to the 2018 EuroLeague Final Four, its fourth consecutive Final Four appearance. Eventually, they lost to Real Madrid, by a score of 80–85 in the finals game. In the finals game, Melli was the finals top scorer, as he scored 28 points, which was the most points scored in a EuroLeague Finals game by a player since 1985. He had a season-best performance in the EuroLeague Finals, scoring 28 points and grabbing 6 rebounds. Over 36 EuroLeague games played in total, he averaged 8.9 points, 5 rebounds and 1.7 assists per game.

=== New Orleans Pelicans (2019–2021) ===
On 25 July 2019, Melli signed with the New Orleans Pelicans of the National Basketball Association (NBA). On 22 October 2019, Melli made his debut in NBA, coming off the bench in a 122–130 overtime loss to the Toronto Raptors with fourteen points, five rebounds and two assists. On 12 February 2020, Melli replaced Deandre Ayton for the World Team in the Rising Stars Challenge.

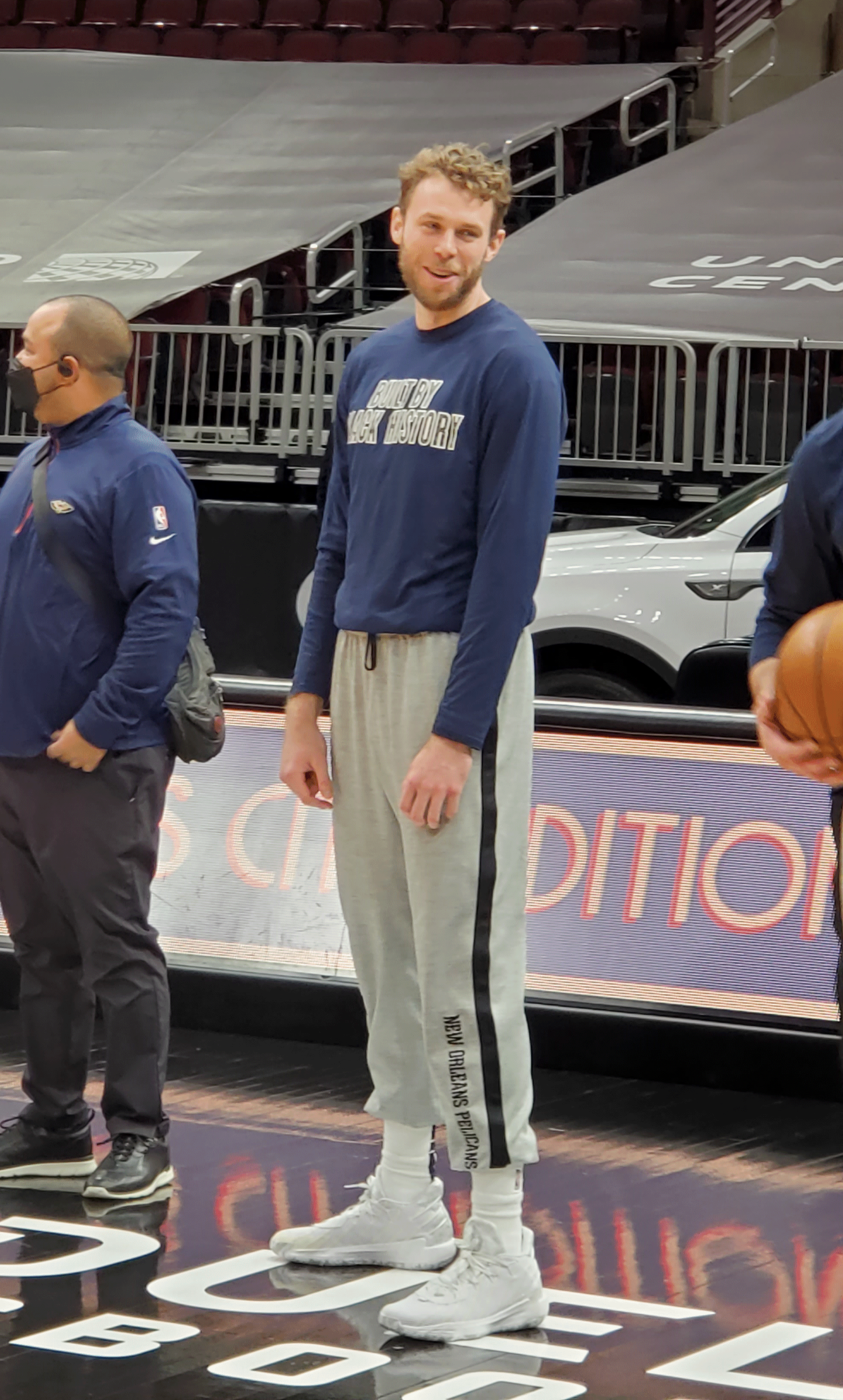
Melli during warmups before a game in Chicago on 10 February 2021

=== Dallas Mavericks (2021) ===
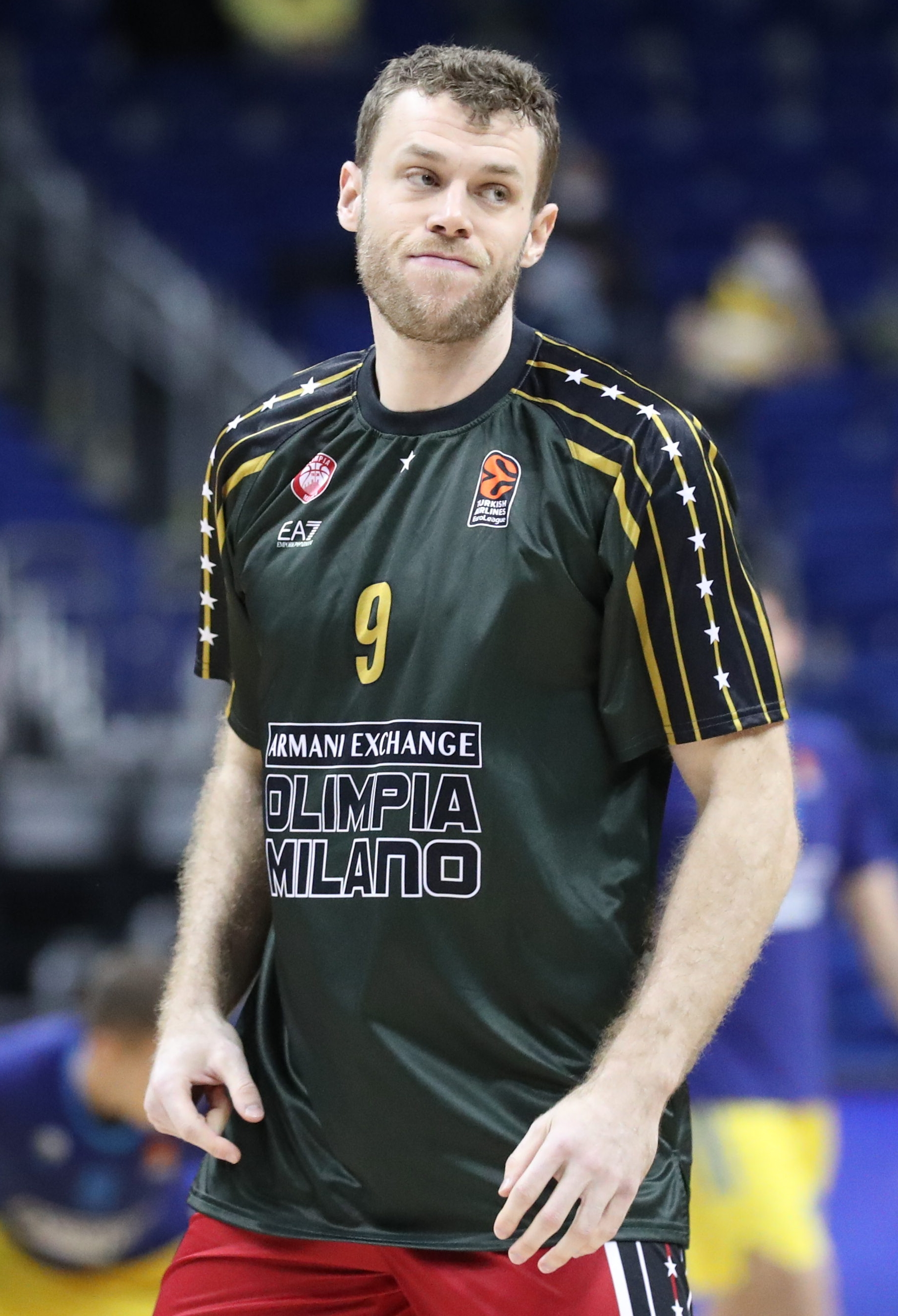
Melli in 2021 with Olimpia Milano

He was traded to the Dallas Mavericks on 26 March 2021, alongside JJ Redick in exchange for James Johnson and Wes Iwundu, in addition to a second-round draft-pick. He made his debut three days later, in a 127–106 win over the Oklahoma City Thunder where he recorded six points in twelve minutes.

=== Return to Olimpia Milano (2021–2024) ===
On 9 July 2021, Melli made his return to Europe by officially signing with his former club Olimpia Milano On June 20, 2024, Melli parted ways once more with the Italian powerhouse.

=== Return to Fenerbahçe (2024–present) ===
On June 25, 2024, he signed with Fenerbahçe Beko of the Turkish Basketbol Süper Ligi (BSL) for a second stint.

On May 25, 2025, Melli helped Fenerbahçe to their second EuroLeague championship in Abu Dhabi. He helped the team defeat the defending champions Panathinaikos in the semi-final with 9 points and 6 rebounds, and Monaco in the final with 5 points and 3 rebounds.

On July 7, 2026, he received a contract extension until the end of the 2027-2028 season.

== National team career ==
=== Italian junior national team ===
Melli played with the Italian Under-16 side at the 2007 FIBA Europe Under-16 Championship, averaging 13.1 points, 9.8 rebounds and 2 blocks per game (all three team bests), as he was selected to the tournament's best five. With the U-18's at the 2008 FIBA Europe Under-18 Championship, he averaged 9.5 points and 6.4 rebounds per game (the latter a team best).

In the 2011 FIBA Europe Under-20 Championship, Melli contributed 10.1 points, 6.8 rebounds and 1 block per game, in nearly 25 minutes played per game, including 23 points and 11 rebounds in the quarterfinal against Montenegro, to help Italy reach the final. He had an off-game against Spain in the semi-final, grabbing 7 rebounds and scoring 9 points, but shooting 2 for 8 from the floor, and committing four fouls, as Italy had to make do with a silver medal.

=== Italian senior national team ===
Melli made his full debut (discounting the All-Star Game) for the senior Italian team in August 2011, though he was rarely called up until 2013.

After being called up to the Italy squad for EuroBasket 2013, the power forward had to play in an unfamiliar center position, due to the lack of big men in Italy's squad. Alternating at the position with Marco Cusin, he was pitted against bigger and stronger opponents, finishing the tournament with a respectable 4.4 points and 4.3 rebounds per game, in around 16 minutes played per game – with highs of 14 points and 10 rebounds against Turkey – as Italy reached the tournament's quarterfinals.

Melli also played at the EuroBasket 2015.

Melli scored a team high 15 points in a win against Nigeria in the preliminary round of the 2020 Summer Olympics in Tokyo, Japan.

== Career statistics ==
Legend
GP	Games played	GS	Games started	MPG	Minutes per game
FG%	Field-goal percentage	3P%	3-point field-goal percentage	FT%	Free-throw percentage
RPG	Rebounds per game	APG	Assists per game	SPG	Steals per game
BPG	Blocks per game	PPG	Points per game	PIR	Performance index rating
**Bold**	Career high

=== NBA ===
==== Regular season ====
Year	Team	GP	GS	MPG	FG%	3P%	FT%	RPG	APG	SPG	BPG	PPG
2019–20	New Orleans	**60**	**8**	**17.4**	**.421**	**.335**	.740	**3.0**	**1.4**	**.4**	**.6**	**6.6**
2020–21	New Orleans	22	0	11.0	.254	.189	**.857**	2.6	1.1	**.4**	.0	2.0
2020–21	Dallas	23	4	14.1	.378	.333	.722	2.8	.8	.2	.1	4.0
Career		105	12	15.3	.392	.316	.745	2.9	1.2	.5	.2	5.0

==== Playoffs ====
Year	Team	GP	GS	MPG	FG%	3P%	FT%	RPG	APG	SPG	BPG	PPG
2021	Dallas	3	0	6.3	.000	.000	—	2.0	—	.3	—	0.0
Career		3	0	6.3	.000	.000	—	2.0	—	.3	—	0.0

=== EuroLeague ===
As of match played 22 May 2026

*	Led the league
†	Won the league

Year	Team	GP	GS	MPG	FG%	3P%	FT%	RPG	APG	SPG	BPG	PPG	PIR
2010–11	Olimpia Milano	10	0	11.1	.375	.300	.667	2.4	.2	.3	.4	3.3	1.9
2011–12	Olimpia Milano	11	1	9.1	.563	.333	.500	1.9	.2	.4	.2	3.4	4.0
2012–13	Olimpia Milano	10	0	15.2	.364	.250	.667	3.0	1.0	.2	.1	4.6	4.0
2013–14	Olimpia Milano	27	20	20.6	.478	.333	.773	4.3	.8	.9	.6	5.3	7.3
2014–15	Olimpia Milano	24	17	20.4	.400	.333	.700	3.5	.8	1.0	.6	5.3	6.1
2015–16	Bamberg	23	23	28.5	.468	**.453**	.815	6.5	**2.7**	.9	**.7**	9.2	14.7
2016–17	Bamberg	30	30	**28.8**	.502	.434	.740	**7.4**	2.3	.7	**.7**	**11.5**	**16.7**
2017–18	Fenerbahçe	36*	16	26.0	.502	.430	.805	5.0	1.7	.9	.3	8.9	12.0
2018–19	Fenerbahçe	36	**34**	25.3	.435	.385	**.816**	4.1	1.6	.9	.6	7.3	9.3
2021–22	Olimpia Milano	32	32	25.0	.467	.292	.792	5.0	1.3	**1.1**	.4	8.1	12.8
2022–23	Olimpia Milano	32	31	25.6	.505	.368	.660	5.4	1.3	1.0	.4	8.2	11.4
2023–24	Olimpia Milano	34	**34**	24.4	.475	.387	.577	4.0	2.0	.9	.6	7.3	9.6
2024–25†	Fenerbahçe	**38**	1	17.2	.479	.373	.607	4.1	1.1	.6	.0	4.9	6.8
2025–26	Fenerbahçe	35	26	23.4	.473	.421	.552	5.5	1.6	.8	.1	7.2	10.1
2026–27	Fenerbahçe	10	0	20.2	.425	.429	.714	4.4	1.1	.4	.6	4.8	7.3
Career		388	265	23.2	.471	.384	.726	4.9	1.5	.8	.5	7.2	9.9

=== Domestic leagues ===
†	Denotes seasons in which Melli won the domestic league

Year	Team	League	GP	MPG	FG%	3P%	FT%	RPG	APG	SPG	BPG	PPG
2007–08	(Italy) Reggiana	LegaDue	25	10.6	.446	.273	.727	2.9	.3	.6	.3	3.4
2008–09	(Italy) Reggiana	LegaDue	13	24.6	.419	.389	.775	5.3	1.0	1.1	.8	8.9
2009–10	(Italy) Reggiana	LegaDue	27	28.2	.460	.180	.719	7.1	.9	1.5	1.0	10.7
2010–11	(Italy) Olimpia Milano	LBA	17	8.9	.289	.231	.571	1.7	.2	.9	.5	1.7
2010–11	(Italy) Victoria Libertas	LBA	12	16.0	.340	.200	1.000	3.2	.6	1.1	.2	3.8
2011–12	(Italy) Olimpia Milano	LBA	37	12.6	.375	.265	.786	3.2	.4	.5	.2	3.8
2012–13	(Italy) Olimpia Milano	LBA	37	17.6	.434	.338	.804	4.1	.8	.4	.4	5.8
2013–14†	(Italy) Olimpia Milano	LBA	47	21.2	.476	.372	.750	4.9	.8	.7	.6	6.9
2014–15	(Italy) Olimpia Milano	LBA	39	20.1	.429	.319	.737	4.3	.9	.7	.6	5.6
2015–16†	(Germany) Bamberg	BBL	42	23.1	.513	.429	.755	5.0	2.6	.6	1.0	9.3
2016–17†	(Germany) Bamberg	BBL	41	22.9	.427	.390	.860	4.9	1.9	.7	.8	8.2
2017–18†	(Turkey) Fenerbahçe	TBSL	36	23.1	.551	.451	.719	4.7	1.9	1.1	.1	7.6
2018–19	(Turkey) Fenerbahçe	TBSL	36	24.9	.471	.414	.836	4.8	2.4	.7	.3	9.9
2021–22†	(Italy) Olimpia Milano	LBA	34	21.4	.516	.250	.692	5.4	1.5	1.1	.3	9.3
2022–23†	(Italy) Olimpia Milano	LBA	42	23.2	.582	.400	.714	6.6	1.4	.9	.5	8.9
2023–24†	(Italy) Olimpia Milano	LBA	39	23.5	.520	.359	.455	6.0	1.8	.8	.6	9.0
2024–25 †	(Turkey) Fenerbahçe	TBSL	35	19.6	.552	.319	.627	5.5	1.3	.9	.4	6.0
2025–26 †	(Turkey) Fenerbahçe	TBSL	32	21.2	.581	.410	.640	5.8	1.9	.7	.4	7.6

== Personal life ==
Melli is the son of the former volleyball player Julie Vollertsen—a silver medalist with the United States at the 1984 Olympic Games—and corporate lawyer (formerly amateur basketball player for Pallacanestro Reggiana and television journalist) Leopoldo Melli. They met when Vollertsen moved from the U.S. to Reggio Emilia to play professionally. Enrico, Melli's younger brother who was born in 1995, has also played basketball for Reggiana.

Melli has dual citizenship in Italy and the United States. He didn't visit the United States until he was 16, and he has said he doesn't feel very American. He describes his English as good but not fluent.
