= Golf at the 2025 SEA Games – Men's individual =

Golf – Men's individual at the 2025 SEA Games
- Venue: Siam Country Club Rolling Hills
- Date: 11 December 2025 – 14 December 2025
- Competitors: 32 from 8 nations

Medalists
gold medal	Pongsapak Laopakdee	Thailand
silver medal	Nguyễn Anh Minh	Vietnam
bronze medal	Parin Sarasmut	Thailand

The men's individual golf competition at the 2025 SEA Games was held from 11 to 14 December 2025 at the Siam Country Club Rolling Hills course in Chonburi, Thailand.

Thailand's Pongsapak Laopakdee won the gold medal with a 72-hole total of 267, 21-under-par, finishing 11 strokes ahead of Vietnam's Nguyễn Anh Minh. Thailand's Parin Sarasmut won the bronze medal with a total of 280.

== Schedule ==
All times are Thailand Standard Time (UTC+07:00)

Date	Time	Event
Thursday, 11 December 2025	08:00	Round 1
Friday, 12 December 2025	08:00	Round 2
Saturday, 13 December 2025	08:00	Round 3
Sunday, 14 December 2025	08:00	Round 4

== Results ==
Rank	Athlete	Round				Total	To par
Rank	Athlete	1	2	3	4	Total	To par
1st place, gold medalist(s)	Pongsapak Laopakdee (THA)	65	66	66	70	267	−21
2nd place, silver medalist(s)	Nguyễn Anh Minh (VIE)	71	70	67	70	278	−10
3rd place, bronze medalist(s)	Parin Sarasmut (THA)	73	64	71	72	280	−8
4	Mohamad Randy Arbenata Bintang (INA)	76	70	65	70	281	−7
T5	Thanawin Lee (THA)	76	69	71	68	284	−4
T5	Rolando Bregente (PHI)	65	73	74	72	284	−4
7	Abdul Latief Rayhan (INA)	73	66	72	76	287	−1
8	Amadeus Christian Susanto (INA)	71	69	73	75	288	E
9	Troy Tian Storm (SGP)	71	71	75	73	290	+2
10	Nguyễn Tuấn Anh (VIE)	75	74	72	70	291	+3
11	Kenneth Henson Sutianto (INA)	75	72	72	73	292	+4
12	Hồ Anh Huy (VIE)	68	73	76	76	293	+5
13	Muhammad Hezri Muhammad Hariz (MAS)	74	71	73	76	294	+6
T14	Anson Boon Xiang Yeo (MAS)	78	71	73	73	295	+7
T14	Kaung Htike Zaw (MYA)	76	78	70	71	295	+7
16	Mohd Firdaus Zubair (MAS)	73	74	73	76	296	+8
T17	Brayden Lee (SGP)	76	73	73	75	297	+9
T17	Chris Jhon Remata (PHI)	78	70	69	80	297	+9
19	Justin Zheng Zhong Kuk (SGP)	70	71	78	79	298	+10
20	Brandon Le Yabandith (LAO)	75	78	72	75	300	+12
21	Nguyễn Trọng Hoàng (VIE)	76	78	73	74	301	+13
T22	Perry Josef Bucay (PHI)	78	75	73	76	302	+14
T22	Justin Mann Shen Chan (MAS)	72	76	76	78	302	+14
24	Warut Boonrod (THA)	76	76	76	75	303	+15
25	Sean Lee (SGP)	79	75	75	75	304	+16
26	Sinxay Philasouk (LAO)	75	78	78	77	308	+20
27	Zin Hein Naing (MYA)	83	72	78	77	310	+22
28	Khaophone Inthilat (LAO)	82	80	79	76	317	+29
29	Min Sitt Thway (MYA)	79	81	81	77	318	+30
30	Kyaw Ko Ko Chit (MYA)	77	85	75	83	320	+32
31	Vasin Manibanseng (LAO)	87	83	84	80	334	+46
—	Shinichi Suzuki (PHI)	78	82	77	RTD	RTD	
