= Fifa Laopakdee =

Thai amateur golfer (born 2005)

Personal information
- Full name: Pongsapak Laopakdee
- Nickname: Fifa
- Nationality: Thailand
- Born: 2 March 2005 (age 21) Rayong, Thailand

Career
- Sport: Golf
- College: Arizona State University
- Status: Amateur

Best results in major championships
- Masters Tournament: CUT: 2026
- PGA Championship: DNP
- U.S. Open: DNP
- The Open Championship: CUT: 2026
Medal record
Men's golf
Representing Thailand
SEA Games
Gold medal – first place	2025 Bangkok–Chonburi	Individual
Gold medal – first place	2025 Bangkok–Chonburi	Team
Silver medal – second place	2021 Hanoi	Team

Pongsapak "Fifa" Laopakdee (Thai: พงศภัค เหล่าภักดี; born 2 March 2005) is a Thai amateur golfer who plays collegiate golf for the Arizona State Sun Devils. He won the Asia-Pacific Amateur Championship in 2025 and 2026, becoming the first Thai winner of the event and the second golfer, after Hideki Matsuyama, to win consecutive titles.

His first Asia-Pacific Amateur victory earned him places in the 2026 Masters Tournament and 2026 Open Championship, where he made his major championship debuts. He also won gold medals in the men's individual and team golf events at the 2025 SEA Games.

== Early life ==
Laopakdee was born on 2 March 2005 in Rayong, Thailand. His nickname, "Fifa", was given to him by his father, Peter Laopakdee, a football supporter, after FIFA. His father also considered calling him "Uefa", after UEFA. His father, a golf teaching professional, introduced him to the sport, and Laopakdee was selected for Thailand's national amateur team at the age of 13.

== Amateur career ==
=== Early career and collegiate golf ===
At the 2021 SEA Games in Vietnam, Laopakdee was a member of the Thai men's team that won a silver medal. In 2022, he represented the International team at the Junior Presidents Cup and Thailand at the Eisenhower Trophy.

Laopakdee attended Arizona State University in the United States, competing for its men's golf team. In April 2025, he won the Thunderbird Collegiate at Papago Golf Club, recording rounds of 66, 67 and 68 for a 12-under-par total of 201.

=== 2025 : Asia-Pacific Amateur Championship and SEA Games ===
In October 2025, Laopakdee won the Asia-Pacific Amateur Championship at Emirates Golf Club in Dubai. Entering the final round six strokes behind Taisei Nagasaki of Japan, he shot a four-under-par 68 to tie Nagasaki at 15-under-par 273. He won on the third extra hole of a sudden-death playoff, becoming the first Thai golfer to win the championship. The victory earned him invitations to the 2026 Masters and The Open.

In December 2025, Laopakdee won two gold medals at the 2025 SEA Games in Thailand, taking the men's individual title and helping Thailand win the men's team event.

=== 2026 : Major championships and second Asia-Pacific Amateur title ===
In March 2026, Laopakdee shared medalist honours at the Desimone Invitational, finishing at 13-under-par 203 as Arizona State won the team competition.

In April, he became the first Thai amateur to compete at the Masters Tournament, playing at Augusta National Golf Club. He missed the cut after rounds of 80 and 75, finishing at 11-over-par 155. He made his Open Championship debut at Royal Birkdale Golf Club in July, recording rounds of 75 and 80 and again missing the cut. Later in 2026, he represented Thailand at the Asian Games, finishing tied for 19th in the men's individual event at one-under-par 279, with rounds of 72, 67, 73 and 67.

On 1 November, Laopakdee successfully defended his Asia-Pacific Amateur title at Te Arai Links in New Zealand. He entered the final round two strokes behind leader Zack Swanwick and closed with a one-under-par 70 to finish at six-under-par 278, three strokes ahead of Swanwick. It was his second consecutive title, making him the second player after Hideki Matsuyama (2010 and 2011) to win the championship in successive years. The victory earned him invitations to the 2027 Masters Tournament and 2027 Open Championship at St Andrews.

== Amateur wins ==
- 2018 TrueVisions Singha Junior Championship 4, Pondok Indah International Junior Championship
- 2019 National Team Ranking #1, TGA-Singha Junior Ranking #6
- 2020 Singha Thailand Amateur Open
- 2021 Thailand Junior Development Tour #3 Eastern Region, Singha Thailand Amateur Open, TJGGA Open Championships #3, Thailand Junior Development Tour #5 Eastern Region
- 2022 National Team Ranking #2, AR American Cup, National Team Ranking #3, Coca Cola Junior Championship at The Highlands, Future Legends Junior Championship
- 2023 National Team Ranking #2, National Team Ranking #5, Maui Jim Individual at Legend Trail
- 2024 Papago Individual
- 2025 Thunderbird Collegiate, Asia-Pacific Amateur Championship, SEA Games
- 2026 Desimone Invitational, Asia-Pacific Amateur Championship

== Results in major championships ==
Tournament	2026
Masters Tournament	CUT
PGA Championship	
U.S. Open	
The Open Championship	CUT

Did not play

CUT = missed the half-way cut

== Team appearances ==
Amateur

- Junior Presidents Cup (representing the International team): 2022
- Eisenhower Trophy (representing Thailand): 2022, 2025
- SEA Games (representing Thailand): 2021, 2025 (winners)
- Asian Games (representing Thailand): 2026
