= 2011–12 Euroleague Top 16 Group H =

Standings and Results for Group H of the Top 16 phase of the 2011–12 Turkish Airlines Euroleague basketball tournament.

== Standings ==
Key to colors
| Top two places in each group advance to Quarterfinals |

| | Team | Pld | W | L | PF | PA | Diff | Tie-break |
|---|---|---|---|---|---|---|---|---|
| 1. | (Spain) FC Barcelona | 6 | 6 | 0 | 430 | 384 | +46 | |
| 2. | (Israel) Maccabi Tel Aviv | 6 | 3 | 3 | 427 | 425 | +2 | 1–1 (+7) |
| 3. | (Italy) Bennet Cantù | 6 | 3 | 3 | 420 | 426 | −6 | 1–1 (−7) |
| 4. | (Lithuania) Žalgiris | 6 | 0 | 6 | 429 | 471 | −42 | |

== Fixtures and results ==
=== Game 1 ===
19 January 2012
20:45

Report

| FC Barcelona Regal (Spain) | 65–60 | (Italy) Bennet Cantù |
Scoring by quarter: 15–18, 13–12, 21–19, 16–11
| Pts: Eidson 15; Rebs: Lorbek 9 Asts: Eidson 5 | | Pts: Micov, Basile 13; Rebs: Micov 9 Asts: Micov 4 |

Palau Blaugrana, Barcelona
Attendance: 4,829
Referees: Grzegorz Ziemblicki (POL), Milija Vojinovic (SRB), Elias Koromilas (GRE)

19 January 2012
18:45

Report

| Žalgiris (Lithuania) | 76–84 | (Israel) Maccabi Tel Aviv |
Scoring by quarter: 16–23, 21–25, 24–16, 15–20
| Pts: Raković 15; Rebs: Javtokas 7 Asts: Popović, Kalnietis 5 | | Pts: Mallet 15; Rebs: Hendrix 6 Asts: Langford 7 |

Žalgiris Arena, Kaunas
Attendance: 14,050
Referees: Luigi Lamonica (ITA), Emilio Perez Pizarro (ESP), Tomas Trawicki (POL)

=== Game 2 ===
25 January 2012
20:45

Report

| Bennet Cantù (Italy) | 79–78 | (Lithuania) Žalgiris |
Scoring by quarter: 21–17, 11–19, 17–23, 30–19
| Pts: Basile 15; Rebs: Micov 7 Asts: Basile, Micov 6 | | Pts: Collins 15; Rebs: Javtokas 8 Asts: Kalnietis 5 |

Palasport di Desio, Desio
Attendance: 5,125
Referees: Jose Ramon Garcia Ortiz (ESP), Srdan Dozai (CRO), Rustu Nuran (TUR)

26 January 2012
20:45

Report

| Maccabi Tel Aviv (Israel) | 57–71 | (Spain) FC Barcelona Regal |
Scoring by quarter: 19–12, 10–17, 13–15, 15–27
| Pts: Langford 17; Rebs: Hendrix 8 Asts: Mallet 2 | | Pts: Lorbek 18; Rebs: Ingles 9 Asts: Eidson 4 |

Yad Eliyahu Arena, Tel Aviv
Attendance: 10,728
Referees: Christos Christodoulou (GRE), Milivoje Jovcic (SRB), Panagiotis Anastopoulos (GRE)

=== Game 3 ===
2 February 2012
20:45

Report

| Bennet Cantù (Italy) | 82–74 | (Israel) Maccabi Tel Aviv |
Scoring by quarter: 23–20, 26–24, 17–16, 16–14
| Pts: Micov 17; Rebs: Markoishvili 7 Asts: Micov 9 | | Pts: Langford 16; Rebs: Hendrix 7 Asts: Papaloukas, Burstein 2 |

Palasport di Desio, Desio
Attendance: 6,133
Referees: Juan Carlos Artega (ESP), Recep Ankarali (TUR), Sreten Radovic (CRO)

2 February 2012
20:45

Report

| FC Barcelona Regal (Spain) | 94–80 | (Lithuania) Žalgiris |
Scoring by quarter: 23–18, 19–25, 21–16, 31–21
| Pts: Lorbek 19; Rebs: Vázquez 6 Asts: Huertas 6 | | Pts: Weems 17; Rebs: Kalnietis 9 Asts: Kalnietis 4 |

Palau Blaugrana, Barcelona
Attendance: 3,565
Referees: Gguerrino Cerebuch (ITA), Tolga Sahin (ITA), Damir Javor (SLO)

=== Game 4 ===
9 February 2012
18:45

Report

| Žalgiris (Lithuania) | 58–67 | (Spain) FC Barcelona Regal |
Scoring by quarter: 19–13, 13–17, 11–17, 15–20
| Pts: Delininkaitis 17; Rebs: Javtokas 9 Asts: Kalnietis 5 | | Pts: Navarro 18; Rebs: Mickeal 6 Asts: Navarro 5 |

Žalgiris Arena, Kaunas
Attendance: 13,610
Referees: Carl Jungebrand (FIN), Borys Ryzhyk (UKR), Renaud Geller (BEL)

9 February 2012
20:05

Report

| Maccabi Tel Aviv (Israel) | 75–60 | (Italy) Bennet Cantù |
Scoring by quarter: 17–14, 22–27, 23–5, 13–14
| Pts: Blu 14; Rebs: Hendrix 9 Asts: Ohayon 3 | | Pts: Basile 20; Rebs: Shermadini 10; Asts: Cinciarini 5 |

Yad Eliyahu Arena, Tel Aviv
Attendance: 10,728
Referees: Ilija Belosevic (SRB), Spiros Gkontas (GRE), Robert Vyklicky (CZE)

=== Game 5 ===
23 February 2012
20:05

Report

| Maccabi Tel Aviv (Israel) | 70–66 | (Lithuania) Žalgiris |
Scoring by quarter: 11–25, 22–12, 11–12, 26–17
| Pts: Langford 17; Rebs: Hendrix 9 Asts: Papaloukas 7 | | Pts: Weems 20; Rebs: Jankūnas 9 Asts: Kalnietis 4 |

Yad Eliyahu Arena, Tel Aviv
Attendance: 10,728
Referees: Daniel Hierrezuelo (ESP), Jakub Zamojski (POL), Elias Koromilas (GRE)

23 February 2012
20:45

Report

| Bennet Cantù (Italy) | 62–63 | (Spain) FC Barcelona Regal |
Scoring by quarter: 18–18, 15–17, 17–17, 12–11
| Pts: Shermadini 14; Rebs: Shermadini 8 Asts: Perkins, Basile 5 | | Pts: N'Dong 13; Rebs: Lorbek 6 Asts: Navarro 4 |

Palasport di Desio, Desio
Attendance: 6,289
Referees: Christos Christodoulou (GRE), Robert Lottermoser (GER), Tasos Piloidis (GRE)

=== Game 6 ===
29 February 2012
18:45

Report

| Žalgiris (Lithuania) | 71–77 | (Italy) Bennet Cantù |
Scoring by quarter: 23–18, 12–21, 15–11, 21–27
| Pts: Popović 15; Rebs: Raković 7 Asts: Popović 5 | | Pts: Markoishvili 32; Rebs: Perkins, Shermadini 8 Asts: Perkins 6 |

Žalgiris Arena, Kaunas
Attendance: 9,150
Referees: Sreten Radovic (CRO), Antonio Conde (ESP), Petri Mäntylä (FIN)

29 February 2012
20:45

Report

| FC Barcelona Regal (Spain) | 70–67 | (Israel) Maccabi Tel Aviv |
Scoring by quarter: 19–21, 15–12, 17–11, 19–23
| Pts: Mickeal 20; Rebs: Perović, Wallace 8 Asts: four players 3 | | Pts: Hendrix 24; Rebs: Hendrix 10; Asts: three players 2 |

Palau Blaugrana, Barcelona
Attendance: 4,624
Referees: Recep Ankarali (TUR), Milivoje Jovcic (SRB), Tolga Sahin (ITA)
