= 2011–12 Euroleague Top 16 Group F =

Standings and Results for Group F of the Top 16 phase of the 2011–12 Turkish Airlines Euroleague basketball tournament.

== Standings ==
Key to colors
Top two places in each group advance to Quarterfinals

	Team	Pld	W	L	PF	PA	Diff	Tie-break
1.	(Italy) Montepaschi Siena	6	4	2	493	435	+58	2−2 (+20)
2.	(Spain) Gescrap Bizkaia	6	4	2	437	423	+14	2–2 (−5)
3.	(Spain) Real Madrid	6	4	2	496	489	+7	2–2 (−15)
4.	(Spain) Unicaja Málaga	6	0	6	407	486	−79	

== Fixtures and results ==
All times given below are in Central European Time.

=== Game 1 ===
January 18, 2012
20:45

Report

Montepaschi Siena (Italy)	81–67	(Spain) Gescrap Bizkaia
Scoring by quarter: 14–18, 18–24, 24–17, 25–18
Pts: McCalebb, Andersen 18; Rebs: Andersen 7 Asts: Rakočević, Stonerook 3		Pts: Vasileiadis 16; Rebs: Hervelle, Fischer 6 Asts: Jackson, López 3

Palasport Mens Sana, Siena
Attendance: 4,153
Referees: Sreten Radovic (CRO), Jakub Zamojski (POL), Olegs Latisevs (LAT)

January 19, 2012
20:45

Report

Unicaja Málaga (Spain)	80–81	(Spain) Real Madrid
Scoring by quarter: 20–15, 19–22, 19–25, 22–19
Pts: Žorić 32; Rebs: Žorić 10; Asts: Valters 7		Pts: Singler 13; Rebs: Tomić 7 Asts: Rodríguez 9

Jose Maria Martin Carpena Arena, Málaga
Attendance: 10,900
Referees: Christos Christodoulou (GRE), Dubravko Muhvic (CRO), Luis Lopes (POR)

=== Game 2 ===
January 25, 2012
20:30

Report

Gescrap Bizkaia (Spain)	85–70	(Spain) Unicaja Málaga
Scoring by quarter: 22–14, 14–17, 22–18, 27–18
Pts: Vasileiadis 19; Rebs: Mavroeidis 11; Asts: Mumbrú 5		Pts: Freeland 18; Rebs: Žorić, Fitch 5 Asts: Rowland 3

Bilbao Arena, Bilbao
Attendance: 8,004
Referees: Zoran Sutulovic (MNE), Tolga Sahin (ITA), Anastasios Piloidis (GRE)

January 25, 2012
20:00

Report

Real Madrid (Spain)	69–88	(Italy) Montepaschi Siena
Scoring by quarter: 15–31, 19–16, 14–18, 21–23
Pts: Reyes 17; Rebs: Reyes 15; Asts: Llull 2		Pts: McCalebb 25; Rebs: Andersen 7 Asts: McCalebb 6

Caja Mágica, Madrid
Attendance: 8,431
Referees: Carl Jungebrand (FIN), Recep Ankarali (TUR), Spiros Gkontas (GRE)

=== Game 3 ===
February 1, 2012
20:45

Report

Real Madrid (Spain)	89–73	(Spain) Gescrap Bizkaia
Scoring by quarter: 26–16, 24–20, 19–19, 20–18
Pts: Rodríguez 20; Rebs: Tomić 7 Asts: Rodríguez 7		Pts: Banić 18; Rebs: Fischer, Banić 6 Asts: Mumbrú 3

Palacio de los Deportes (Madrid), Madrid
Attendance: 11,200
Referees: Sasa Pukl (SLO), Milivoje Jovcic (SRB), Robert Lottermoser (GER)

February 2, 2012
20:45

Report

Unicaja Málaga (Spain)	68–91	(Italy) Montepaschi Siena
Scoring by quarter: 19–27, 21–23, 17–21, 11–20
Pts: Freeland 14; Rebs: Freeland 9 Asts: Berni Rodríguez 4		Pts: Moss 20; Rebs: Moss 7 Asts: McCalebb 3

Jose Maria Martin Carpena Arena, Málaga
Attendance: 9,500
Referees: Grzegorz Ziemblicki (POL), Mmatej Boltauzer (SLO), Fernando Rocha (POR)

=== Game 4 ===
February 8, 2012
20:00

Report

Montepaschi Siena (Italy)	84–69	(Spain) Unicaja Málaga
Scoring by quarter: 23–19, 29–27, 15–14, 17–9
Pts: McCalebb 18; Rebs: Ress 5 Asts: Rakočević 3		Pts: Fitch 15; Rebs: Freeland 8 Asts: Perić 4

Palasport Mens Sana, Siena
Attendance: 4,427
Referees: Christos Christodoulou (GRE), Eddie Viator (FRA), Radomir Vojinovic (MNE)

February 8, 2012
20:30

Report

Gescrap Bizkaia (Spain)	93–69	(Spain) Real Madrid
Scoring by quarter: 34–14, 18–12, 20–25, 21–18
Pts: Vasileiadis 19; Rebs: Fischer 9 Asts: Jackson 10		Pts: Mirotić 18; Rebs: Begić 10; Asts: Rodríguez 5

Bilbao Arena, Bilbao
Attendance: 9,158
Referees: Guerrino Cerebuch (ITA), Matej Boltauzer (SLO), Milija Vojinovic (SRB)

=== Game 5 ===
February 22, 2012
19:00

Report

Gescrap Bizkaia (Spain)	60–59	(Italy) Montepaschi Siena
Scoring by quarter: 7–8, 14–14, 18–17, 21–20
Pts: Banić 16; Rebs: Fischer 12; Asts: Three players 2		Pts: Rakočević 14; Rebs: Andersen 7 Asts: Zisis, Andersen 3

Bilbao Arena, Bilbao
Attendance: 9,922
Referees: Dubravko Muhvic (CRO), Boris Ryzhyk (UKR), Luis Lopes (POR)

February 23, 2012
20:45

Report

Real Madrid (Spain)	86–65	(Spain) Unicaja Málaga
Scoring by quarter: 14–22, 27–19, 18–12, 27–12
Pts: Mirotić 18; Rebs: Mirotić 10; Asts: Rodríguez 5		Pts: Fitch 15; Rebs: Lima 7 Asts: Rowland 3

Caja Mágica, Madrid
Attendance: 7,342
Referees: Ilija Belosevic (SRB), Sreten Radovic (CRO), Panagiotis Anastopoulos (GRE)

=== Game 6 ===
March 1, 2012
20:45

Report

Unicaja Málaga (Spain)	55–59	(Spain) Gescrap Bizkaia
Scoring by quarter: 16–15, 6–9, 14–18, 19–17
Pts: Perić 19; Rebs: Žorić 11; Asts: Rowland 7		Pts: Jackson, Banić 10; Rebs: Hervelle 10; Asts: López 4

Jose Maria Martin Carpena Arena, Málaga
Attendance: 4,000
Referees: Grzegorz Ziemblicki (POL), Paolo Taurino (ITA), Robert Vyklicky (CZE)

March 1, 2012
20:45

Report

Montepaschi Siena (Italy)	90–102	(Spain) Real Madrid
Scoring by quarter: 28–26, 25–26, 22–24, 15–26
Pts: McCalebb, Ress 15; Rebs: Moss 3 Asts: Stonerook 4		Pts: Pocius 15; Rebs: Reyes 14; Asts: Rodríguez 5

Palasport Mens Sana, Siena
Attendance: 5,055
Referees: Sasa Pukl (SLO), Srdan Dozai (CRO), Robert Lottermoser (GER)
