= Golf at the 2025 SEA Games =

- Venue: Siam Country Club Rolling Hills
- Location: Pattaya, Chonburi, Thailand
- Dates: 11–14 December 2025

Golf competitions at the 2025 SEA Games were held at Siam Country Club Rolling Hills in Pattaya, Chonburi, Thailand, from 11 to 14 December 2025.

Thailand swept all four gold medals in the men's and women's individual and team events.

== Medal table ==
* Host nation (Thailand)

| Rank | Nation | Gold | Silver | Bronze | Total |
|---|---|---|---|---|---|
| 1 | Thailand* | 4 | 1 | 1 | 6 |
| 2 | Vietnam | 0 | 1 | 2 | 3 |
| 3 | Indonesia | 0 | 1 | 1 | 2 |
| 4 | Singapore | 0 | 1 | 0 | 1 |
| Totals (4 entries) | | 4 | 4 | 4 | 12 |

== Medalists ==
| Event | Gold | Silver | Bronze |
|---|---|---|---|
| Men's individual | Pongsapak Laopakdee; Thailand | Nguyễn Anh Minh; Vietnam | Parin Sarasmut; Thailand |
| Men's team | Thailand; Parin Sarasmut; Thanawin Lee; Warut Boonrod; Pongsapak Laopakdee | Indonesia; Kenneth Henson Sutianto; Rayhan Abdul Latief; Amadeus Christian Susanto | Vietnam; Nguyễn Anh Minh; Hồ Anh Huy; Nguyễn Tuấn Anh; Nguyễn Trọng Hoàng |
| Women's individual | Prim Prachnakorn; Thailand | Kritchanya Kaopattanaskul; Thailand | Lê Chúc An; Vietnam |
| Women's team | Thailand; Kritchanya Kaopattanaskul; Prim Prachnakorn; Pimpisa Rubrong | Singapore; Chen Xingtong; Valencia Chang Xin Ru; Inez Ng Xin Yi | Indonesia; Sania Talita Wahyudi; Bianca Naomi Amina Laksono; Elaine Widjaja |
