= Honda LPGA Thailand =

Professional golf competition

Coordinates: 12.917°N 100.985°E

Tournament information
- Location: Chonburi, Thailand
- Established: 2006
- Courses: Siam Country Club, Pattaya; Old Course
- Par: 72
- Length: 6,576 yards (6,013 m)
- Organized by: IMG
- Tour: LPGA Tour
- Format: Stroke play (72 holes, no cut)
- Prize fund: $1.8 million
- Month played: February

Tournament record score
- Aggregate: 260 Angel Yin (2025)
- To par: −28 as above

Current champion
- (Thailand) Jeeno Thitikul

Location in Thailand

The Honda LPGA Thailand is a women's professional golf tournament in Thailand on the LPGA Tour. First played in 2006 at the Amata Spring Country Club, the tournament moved to the Siam Country Club, Pattaya in 2007, on its Old Course. It was the first LPGA Tour event held in Thailand and it increased the number of countries on the 2006 LPGA schedule to eight, including the United States.

The tournament was not held in 2008, but returned to the LPGA schedule in 2009. It was held at the newer Plantation Course for this year only, then returned to the Old Course in 2010. The tournament is a limited-field event with no cut; in 2011, 60 players were in the tournament (57 professionals and 3 amateurs); a full-field LPGA tournament has about 144 players. The 2012 event included a field of 70 players, with top-ranked Yani Tseng successfully defending her title, one stroke ahead of runner-up Ai Miyazato, the 2010 champion.

The title sponsor is Honda, a Japanese-based manufacturer of automobiles, trucks, motorcycles, scooters, and robots.

== Tournament names ==
- 2006–2009: Honda LPGA Thailand
- 2010: Honda PTT LPGA Thailand
- 2011–present: Honda LPGA Thailand

== Tournament hosts ==
Years	No.	Venue	Location
2007, 2010–present	13	Siam Country Club, Pattaya Old Course	Pattaya, Chonburi
2009	1	Siam Country Club, Pattaya Plantation Course	Pattaya, Chonburi
2006	1	Amata Spring Country Club	Mueang Chonburi, Chonburi

- No event in 2008 and 2020

== Winners ==
Year	Date	Winner	Score	To par	Margin of victory	Runner(s)-up	Winner's share ($)	Purse ($)
2026	22 Feb	(Thailand) Jeeno Thitikul	264	−24	1 stroke	(Japan) Chizzy Iwai	270,000	1,800,000
2025	23 Feb	(United States) Angel Yin	260	−28	1 stroke	(Japan) Akie Iwai	255,000	1,700,000
2024	26 Feb	(Thailand) Patty Tavatanakit	267	−21	1 stroke	(Switzerland) Albane Valenzuela	255,000	1,700,000
2023	26 Feb	(United States) Lilia Vu	266	−22	1 stroke	(Thailand) Natthakritta Vongtaveelap	255,000	1,700,000
2022	13 Mar	(Denmark) Nanna Koerstz Madsen	262	−26	Playoff (Note: Madsen won with an eagle on the second hole of a sudden-death playoff.)	(China) Lin Xiyu	240,000	1,600,000
2021	9 May	(Thailand) Ariya Jutanugarn	266	−22	1 stroke	(Thailand) Atthaya Thitikul	240,000	1,600,000
2020	Tournament canceled due to COVID-19 pandemic							
2019	24 Feb	(South Korea) Amy Yang (3)	266	−22	1 stroke	(Australia) Minjee Lee	240,000	1,600,000
2018	25 Feb	(United States) Jessica Korda	263	−25	4 strokes	(Thailand) Moriya Jutanugarn (United States) Lexi Thompson	240,000	1,600,000
2017	26 Feb	(South Korea) Amy Yang (2)	266	−22	5 strokes	(South Korea) Ryu So-yeon	240,000	1,600,000
2016	28 Feb	(United States) Lexi Thompson	268	−20	6 strokes	(South Korea) Chun In-gee	250,000	1,600,000
2015	1 Mar	(South Korea) Amy Yang	273	−15	2 strokes	(South Korea) Mirim Lee (United States) Stacy Lewis (Taiwan) Yani Tseng	225,000	1,500,000
2014	23 Feb	(Sweden) Anna Nordqvist	273	−15	2 strokes	(South Korea) Inbee Park	225,000	1,500,000
2013	24 Feb	(South Korea) Inbee Park	276	−12	1 stroke	(Thailand) Ariya Jutanugarn	225,000	1,500,000
2012	19 Feb	(Taiwan) Yani Tseng (2)	269	−19	1 stroke	(Japan) Ai Miyazato	225,000	1,500,000
2011	20 Feb	(Taiwan) Yani Tseng	273	−15	5 strokes	(United States) Michelle Wie	217,500	1,450,000
2010	21 Feb	(Japan) Ai Miyazato	267	−21	1 stroke	(Norway) Suzann Pettersen	195,000	1,300,000
2009	1 Mar	(Mexico) Lorena Ochoa	274	−14	3 strokes	(South Korea) Hee Young Park	217,500	1,450,000
2008	No tournament							
2007	28 Oct	(Norway) Suzann Pettersen	267	−21	1 stroke	(England) Laura Davies	195,000	1,300,000
2006	22 Oct	(South Korea) Han Hee-won	202	−14	5 strokes	(United States) Diana D'Alessio	195,000	1,300,000

== Tournament records ==
Year	Player	Score	Round	Course
2025	Akie Iwai	61 (−11)	4th	Siam Country Club, Pattaya Old Course
2026	Lee So-mi	61 (−11)	2nd	Siam Country Club, Pattaya Old Course

== Video ==
- YouTube - LPGA Rewind, highlights of 2010 event.
