= Golf at the 1995 SEA Games =

- Venue: Chiang Mai–Lamphun Golf Club
- Dates: 11–14 December 1995
- Competitors: 48 from 8 nations

Golf at the 1995 SEA Games was held at Chiang Mai–Lamphun Golf Club, Chiang Mai, Thailand, from 11 to 14 December 1995 and featured four events: the men's individual and team events and women's individual and team events.

A total of 48 golfers, comprising 32 men and 16 women from eight nations, competed in the tournament.

== Schedule ==
R1	Round 1	R2	Round 2	R3	Round 3	FR	Final round

Event↓/Date →	11th Mon	12th Tue	13th Wed	14th Thu
Men's individual	R1	R2	R3	FR
Women's individual	R1	R2	R3	FR
Men's team	R1	R2	R3	FR
Women's team	R1	R2	R3	FR

== Medal summary ==
=== Medal table ===
* Host nation (Thailand)

Rank	Nation	Gold	Silver	Bronze	Total
1	Thailand*	2	2	1	5
2	Philippines	2	2	0	4
3	Malaysia	0	0	3	3
Totals (3 entries)		4	4	4	12

=== Medalists ===
Event	Gold	Silver	Bronze
Men's individual	Chawalit Plaphol; Thailand	Juan Miguel Rocha; Philippines	Somchai Sophin; Thailand
Men's team	Thailand; Chawalit Plaphol; Thongchai Jaidee; Songphan Peaukprakong; Somchai Sophin	Philippines; Antonio Lascuna; Juan Miguel Rocha; Richard Sinfuego; Reynaldo Pagunsan	Malaysia; Rahizam Ramli; Rashid Ismail; Danny Chia; Ramasamy Nachimut
Women's individual	Jennifer Rosales; Philippines	Pearwan Udompansa; Thailand	Lim Siew Ai; Malaysia
Women's team	Philippines; Jennifer Rosales; Carmelette Villar; Magdalena De Guzman	Thailand; Virada Nirapathpongporn; Rungthiwa Pangjan; Pearwan Udompansa	Malaysia; Lim Ai Lian; Lim Siew Ai; Doroth, Wan Ming

== Participating nations ==
A total of 48 athletes from eight nations competed in golf at the 1995 SEA Games:

- Brunei
- Indonesia
- Laos
- Malaysia
- Myanmar
- Philippines
- Singapore
- Thailand
