= Golf at the 2013 SEA Games – Women's individual =

The women's team competition at the 2013 SEA Games in Naypyidaw was held on from 16 December to 18 December at the Royal Myanmar Golf Course.

== Schedule ==
All times are Myanmar Standard Time (UTC+06:30)

Date	Time	Event
Monday, 16 December 2013	08:00	First round
Tuesday, 17 December 2013	07:30	Second round
Wednesday, 18 December 2013	07:30	Third round

== Results ==
Rank	Athlete	Rounds			Total	To par
Rank	Athlete	1	2	3	Total	To par
1st place, gold medalist(s)	Princess Mary Superal (PHI)	72	66	72	210	−6
2nd place, silver medalist(s)	Yin May Myo (MYA)	71	73	72	216	0
3rd place, bronze medalist(s)	Tatiana Jaqueline Wijaya (INA)	75	73	69	217	+1
4	Benyapa Niphatsophon (THA)	76	73	69	218	+2
5	Michelle Lay Sia Koh (MAS)	72	75	72	219	+3
6	Clare Amelia Legaspi (PHI)	72	75	73	220	+4
7	Supamas Sangchan (THA)	72	75	76	223	+7
=8	Amanda Tan (SIN)	77	76	72	225	+9
=8	May Oo Khine (MYA)	77	70	78	225	+9
10	Nur Durriyah Binti Damian Utal (MAS)	78	73	76	227	+11
=11	Victoria Chanora (INA)	81	74	74	229	+13
=11	Katrina Pelen-Briones (PHI)	79	73	77	229	+13
=11	Ornnicha Konsunthea (THA)	75	76	78	229	+13
=14	Vivienne Ven Yi Chin (MAS)	83	76	71	230	+14
=14	Khin Mar Nwe (MYA)	76	77	77	230	+14
16	Koh Sock Hwee (SIN)	78	77	77	232	+16
=17	Wei Ping Amelia Yong (SIN)	77	81	76	234	+18
=17	Gavrilla Arya (INA)	76	80	78	234	+18
=17	Bao Nghi Ngo (VIE)	76	76	82	234	+18
20	Lina Chan (CAM)	102	89	89	280	+64
