= 2011–12 Euroleague Top 16 Group G =

Standings and results for Group G of the Top 16 phase of the 2011–12 Turkish Airlines Euroleague basketball tournament.

== Standings ==
Key to colors
Top two places in each group advance to Quarterfinals

	Team	Pld	W	L	PF	PA	Diff	Tie-break
1.	(Greece) Panathinaikos	6	4	2	436	394	+42	
2.	(Russia) UNICS	6	3	3	432	423	+9	1–1 (+10)
3.	(Italy) EA7 Milano	6	3	3	379	390	−11	1–1 (–10)
4.	(Turkey) Fenerbahçe Ülker	6	2	4	420	460	−40	

== Fixtures/results ==
=== Game 1 ===
18 January 2012
17:00

Report

UNICS (Russia)	76–71	(Turkey) Fenerbahçe Ülker
Scoring by quarter: 15–18, 9–23, 29–15, 23–15
Pts: Veremeenko 17; Rebs: Veremeenko 11; Asts: Samoylenko 10		Pts: Bogdanović 24; Rebs: Savaş 6 Asts: Jerrells 4

Basket Hall Arena, Kazan
Attendance: 5,000
Referees: Juan Carlos Garcia Gonzalez (ESP), Eddie Viator (FRA), Damir Javor (SLO)

19 January 2012
20:45

Report

EA7 Milano (Italy)	57–78	(Greece) Panathinaikos
Scoring by quarter: 10–24, 13–19, 10–15, 24–20
Pts: Fotsis 10; Rebs: Three players 6 Asts: Cook 3		Pts: Logan 12; Rebs: Marić 7 Asts: Diamantidis 4

Mediolanum Forum, Milan
Attendance: 5,200
Referees: Sasa Pukl (SLO), Roman Ryzhyk (UKR), Petri Mantyla (FIN)

=== Game 2 ===
25 January 2012
20:00

Report

Fenerbahçe Ülker (Turkey)	65–63	(Italy) EA7 Milano
Scoring by quarter: 12–10, 18–18, 16–15, 19–20
Pts: Bogdanović 17; Rebs: Türkcan 12; Asts: Ukić, Preldžič 2		Pts: Fotsis, Rocca 16; Rebs: Rocca 11; Asts: Cook 8

Ülker Sports Arena, Istanbul
Attendance: 12,191
Referees: Miguel Perez Perez (ESP), Fernando Rocha (POR), Robert Vyklicky (CZE)

25 January 2012
20:45

Report

Panathinaikos (Greece)	83–89	(Russia) UNICS
Scoring by quarter: 22–17, 20–24, 14–22, 27–26
Pts: Batiste 16; Rebs: Diamantidis 7 Asts: Jasikevičius 5		Pts: Domercant 21; Rebs: Three players 5 Asts: Greer 5

Olympic Indoor Hall, Athens
Attendance: 8,500
Referees: Dani Hierrezuelo (ESP), Antonio Conde (ESP), Radomir Vojinovic (MNE)

=== Game 3 ===
1 February 2012
17:00

Report

UNICS (Russia)	59–44	(Italy) EA7 Milano
Scoring by quarter: 20–12, 16–8, 9–7, 14–17
Pts: Domercant 16; Rebs: Veremeenko 11; Asts: Samoylenko 4		Pts: Melli 17; Rebs: Mancinelli 7 Asts: Cook 4

Basket Hall Arena, Kazan
Attendance: 5,000
Referees: José Martín (ESP), Spiros Gkontas (GRE), Radomir Vojinovic (MNE)

2 February 2012
19:30

Report

Fenerbahçe Ülker (Turkey)	56–77	(Greece) Panathinaikos
Scoring by quarter: 9–24, 13–12, 21–22, 13–19
Pts: Jerrells 12; Rebs: Türkcan 8 Asts: Ukić, Atsür 3		Pts: Kaimakoglou 19; Rebs: Sato 10; Asts: Diamantidis 8

Ülker Sports Arena, Istanbul
Attendance: 11,917
Referees: Luigi Lamonica (ITA), Borys Ryzhyk (UKR), LATISEVS, Latisevs (LAT)

=== Game 4 ===
8 February 2012
20:45

Report

EA7 Milano (Italy)	63–58	(Russia) UNICS
Scoring by quarter: 20–13, 12–15, 17–15, 14–15
Pts: Fotsis 16; Rebs: Fotsis 6 Asts: Cook 7		Pts: Three players 11; Rebs: Wilkinson 9 Asts: Samoylenko 3

Mediolanum Forum, Milan
Attendance: 2,400
Referees: Juan Carlos Arteaga (ESP), Sreten Radovic (CRO), Sergio Silva (POR)

9 February 2012
20:45

Report

Panathinaikos (Greece)	72–62	(Turkey) Fenerbahçe Ülker
Scoring by quarter: 24–16, 16–14, 18–16, 14–19
Pts: Tsartsaris 21; Rebs: Sato, Batiste 6 Asts: Diamantidis 5		Pts: Bogdanovic 15; Rebs: Türkcan 13; Asts: Four players 2

Olympic Indoor Hall, Athens
Attendance: 12,500
Referees: Grzegorz Ziemblicki (POL), Robert Lottermoser (GER), Boris Shulga (UKR)

=== Game 5 ===
23 February 2012
20:45

Report

Fenerbahçe Ülker (Turkey)	94–87 (OT)	(Russia) UNICS
Scoring by quarter: 21–26, 21–18, 13–24, 24–11, Overtime: 15–8
Pts: Bogdanović 20; Rebs: Türkcan 13; Asts: Türkcan, Preldžić		Pts: Greer 33; Rebs: Greer, McCarty 6 Asts: Greer 6

Ülker Sports Arena, Istanbul
Attendance: 11,870
Referees: Sasa Pukl (SLO), Milivoje Jovcic (SRB), Vicente Bulto (ESP)

23 February 2012
21:00

Report

Panathinaikos (Greece)	58–67	(Italy) EA7 Milano
Scoring by quarter: 11–16, 21–18, 14–19, 12–14
Pts: Diamantidis 12; Rebs: Kaimakoglou 12; Asts: Diamantidis 3		Pts: Melli 13; Rebs: Hairston 5 Asts: Cook 12

Olympic Indoor Hall, Athens
Attendance: 11,000
Referees: Carl Jungebrand (FIN), J.C. Garcia Gonzalez (ESP), Damir Javor (SLO)

=== Game 6 ===
29 February 2012
18:30

Report

UNICS (Russia)	63–68	(Greece) Panathinaikos
Scoring by quarter: 21–22, 17–18, 10–12, 15–16
Pts: Domercant 19; Rebs: Wilkinson 7 Asts: Samoylenko 7		Pts: Batiste 12; Rebs: Batiste, Sato 5 Asts: Diamantidis, Jasikevičius 5

Basket Hall Arena, Kazan
Attendance: 6,500
Referees: Luigi Lamonica (ITA), Matej Boltauzer (SLO), Olegs Latisevs (LAT)

29 February 2012
18:30

Report

EA7 Milano (Italy)	85–72	(Turkey) Fenerbahçe Ülker
Scoring by quarter: 20–21, 26–19, 20–15, 19–17
Pts: Hairston 27; Rebs: three players 5 Asts: Cook 8		Pts: Preldžič 15; Rebs: Gist 9 Asts: Preldžič 5

Mediolanum Forum, Milan
Attendance: 2,500
Referees: José Martín (ESP), Ilija Belosevic (SRB), Milija Vojinovic (SRB)
