= 2011–12 Euroleague Top 16 Group E =

Standings and Results for Group E of the Top 16 phase of the 2011–12 Turkish Airlines Euroleague basketball tournament.

== Standings ==
Key to colors
Top two places in each group advance to Quarterfinals

	Team	Pld	W	L	PF	PA	Diff	Tie-break
1.	(Russia) CSKA Moscow	6	5	1	509	413	+96	
2.	(Greece) Olympiacos	6	3	3	457	471	−14	1−1 (+6)
3.	(Turkey) Galatasaray	6	3	3	423	438	−15	1−1 (−6)
4.	(Turkey) Anadolu Efes	6	1	5	387	454	−67	

== Fixtures and results ==
All times given below are in Central European Time.

=== Game 1 ===
January 18, 2012
20:45

Report

Olympiacos (Greece)	78–86	(Russia) CSKA Moscow
Scoring by quarter: 21–22, 23–18, 14–22, 20–24
Pts: Gecevičius 14; Rebs: Hines, Printezis 6 Asts: Sloukas 3		Pts: Krstić 18; Rebs: Khryapa 7 Asts: Teodosić, Kirilenko 3

Peace and Friendship Stadium, Piraeus
Attendance: 6,500
Referees: José Martín (ESP), Robert Lottermoser (GER), Zdravko Rutesic (MNE)

January 19, 2012
19:30

Report

Anadolu Efes (Turkey)	68–62	(Turkey) Galatasaray
Scoring by quarter: 29–19, 16–15, 15–18, 8–10
Pts: Vujačić 17; Rebs: Savanović 17; Asts: Tunçeri 7		Pts: Andric 14; Rebs: Gordon 9 Asts: Shipp 5

Sinan Erdem Dome, Istanbul
Attendance: 9,600
Referees: Dani Hierrezuelo (ESP), Matej Boltauzer (SLO), Boris Shulga (UKR)

=== Game 2 ===
January 25, 2012
17:15

Report

CSKA Moscow (Russia)	96–68	(Turkey) Anadolu Efes
Scoring by quarter: 23–21, 25–15, 26–17, 22–15
Pts: Kirilenko 15; Rebs: Kirilenko 8 Asts: Khryapa 8		Pts: Vujačić 21; Rebs: Savanović 8 Asts: Lafayette 3

CSKA Universal Sports Hall, Moscow
Attendance: 4,400
Referees: Guerrino Cerebuch (ITA), Vicente Bulto (ESP), Sinisa Herceg (CRO)

January 26, 2012
19:30

Report

Galatasaray (Turkey)	78–77 (OT)	(Greece) Olympiacos
Scoring by quarter: 15-15, 27–13, 15–19, 12–22, Overtime: 9–8
Pts: Gordon 17; Rebs: Shipp 5 Asts: Arslan 4		Pts: Spanoulis 24; Rebs: Spanoulis 6 Asts: Hines 4

Abdi İpekçi Arena, Istanbul
Attendance: 11,300
Referees: Paolo Taurino (ITA), Emilio Perez Pizarro (ESP), Juan Carlos Arteaga (ESP)

=== Game 3 ===
February 1, 2012
19:45

Report

Olympiacos (Greece)	83–65	(Turkey) Anadolu Efes
Scoring by quarter: 20–12, 21–24, 12–17, 30–12
Pts: Spanoulis 18; Rebs: Papanikolaou 7 Asts: Spanoulis 4		Pts: Barać 14; Rebs: Barać 8 Asts: Tunçeri 4

Peace and Friendship Stadium, Piraeus
Attendance: 3,500
Referees: Carl Jungebrand (FIN), Borys Ryzhyk (UKR), Eddie Viator (FRA)

February 2, 2012
17:15

Report

CSKA Moscow (Russia)	85–70	(Turkey) Galatasaray
Scoring by quarter: 19–12, 25–25, 22–15, 19–18
Pts: Krstić 20; Rebs: Krstić 9 Asts: Khryapa 6		Pts: Gordon 15; Rebs: Aldemir 9 Asts: Gordon 5

CSKA Universal Sports Hall, Moscow
Attendance: 4,560
Referees: Ilija Belosevic (SRB), Dubravko Muhvic (CRO), Jakub Zamojski (POL)

=== Game 4 ===
February 8, 2012
19:30

Report

Anadolu Efes (Turkey)	65–67	(Greece) Olympiacos
Scoring by quarter: 9–19, 23–21, 10–11, 23–16
Pts: Lafayette 22; Rebs: Barać 7 Asts: Three players 2		Pts: Printezis, Papanikolaou 16; Rebs: Dorsey 8 Asts: Antic, Sloukas 3

Sinan Erdem Dome, Istanbul
Attendance: 8,426
Referees: Luigi Lamonica (ITA), Juan Carlos Garcia Gonzalez (ESP), Miguel Perez Perez (ESP)

February 9, 2012
19:00

Report

Galatasaray (Turkey)	68–64	(Russia) CSKA Moscow
Scoring by quarter: 15–13, 16–23, 24–18, 13–10
Pts: Shipp 22; Rebs: Andric 7 Asts: Gordon 5		Pts: Shved, Kaun 11; Rebs: Three players 5 Asts: Teodosić, Šiškauskas 4

Abdi İpekçi Arena, Istanbul
Attendance: 11,300
Referees: José Martín (ESP), Antonio Conde (ESP), Roberto Chiari (ITA)

=== Game 5 ===
February 22, 2012
17:15

Report

CSKA Moscow (Russia)	96–64	(Greece) Olympiacos
Scoring by quarter: 30–16, 24–10, 18–18, 24–20
Pts: Vorontsevich 15; Rebs: Kirilenko 7 Asts: Gordon 6		Pts: Spanoulis 12; Rebs: Dorsey 6 Asts: Seven players 1

CSKA Universal Sports Hall, Moscow
Attendance: 5,000
Referees: Matej Boltauzer (SLO), J.R. Garcia Ortiz (ESP), Tolga Sahin (ITA)

February 22, 2012
19:30

Report

Galatasaray (Turkey)	64–56	(Turkey) Anadolu Efes
Scoring by quarter: 20–13, 19–19, 11–13, 14–11
Pts: Andric 15; Rebs: Savović 8 Asts: Arslan 3		Pts: Barać 16; Rebs: Vujačić, Savanović 8 Asts: Tunçeri 5

Abdi İpekçi Arena, Istanbul
Attendance: 11,300
Referees: Grzegorz Ziemblicki (POL), Milija Vojinovic (SRB), Olegs Latisevs (LAT)

=== Game 6 ===
March 1, 2012
18:45

Report

Anadolu Efes (Turkey)	65–82	(Russia) CSKA Moscow
Scoring by quarter: 20–22, 17–25, 17–17, 11–18
Pts: Vujačić 17; Rebs: Batista 11; Asts: Three players 3		Pts: Kirilenko 15; Rebs: Four players 4 Asts: Shved 6

Sinan Erdem Dome, Istanbul
Attendance: 4,800
Referees: Carl Jungebrand (FIN), Emilio Perez Pizarro (ESP), Eddie Viator (FRA)

March 1, 2012
20:45

Report

Olympiacos (Greece)	88–81	(Turkey) Galatasaray
Scoring by quarter: 24–14, 19–21, 24–23, 21–23
Pts: Spanoulis 20; Rebs: Antic 6 Asts: Spanoulis 8		Pts: Andric 15; Rebs: Andric, Aldemir 6 Asts: Arslan 6

Peace and Friendship Stadium, Piraeus
Attendance: 7,000
Referees: Juan Carlos Arteaga (ESP), Guerrino Cerebuch (ITA), Vicente Bulto (ESP)
