= Siam Country Club =

Golf course in Thailand

- Interactive map of Siam Country Club
- 12°55′05″N 100°59′16″E

Club information
- Location: Bang Lamung district, Chonburi, Thailand
- Established: 1971
- Type: Private
- Owner: Siam Motors Group
- Tota holes: 81
- Tournaments: Honda LPGA Thailand; Thailand Open (1973, 1978, 1984, 2015); Trust Golf Asian Mixed (2022); Women's Amateur Asia-Pacific (2022, 2024)
- Website: siamcountryclub.com

Old Course
- Designed by: Ichisuke Izumi; Schmidt-Curley Design
- Par: 72
- Length: 7,068 yd (6,463 m)
- Course rating: 74.1

Plantation
- Designed by: Schmidt-Curley Design
- Par: 108
- Length: 11,089 yd (10,140 m)

Waterside
- Designed by: IMG Golf Course Design
- Par: 72
- Length: 7,439 yd (6,802 m)
- Course rating: 74.8

Rolling Hills
- Designed by: Schmidt-Curley Design
- Par: 72
- Length: 7,267 yd (6,645 m)
- Course rating: 74.4

Siam Country Club (Thai: สยามคันทรีคลับ) is a golf complex and tournament venue in Bang Lamung district, Chonburi province, near Pattaya, Thailand. Established in 1971, its original course has been described as the first privately owned golf course in Thailand. The complex is owned and operated by the Siam Motors Group and comprises four courses: the Old Course, Plantation Course, Waterside Course and Rolling Hills Course.

The Old Course is a recurring venue of the Honda LPGA Thailand, an LPGA Tour event held in Thailand.

== History ==
Siam Country Club was founded by Dr. Thaworn Phornprapha, the founder of the Siam Motors Group. The original 18-hole course, now known as the Old Course, opened in 1971 and operated as a single-course facility for over three decades.

In 2006, the facility was closed for a comprehensive, year-long renovation led by the American golf architecture firm Schmidt-Curley Design. The project involved rebuilding all greens, replacing fairway grasses with seashore paspalum, and modernising the routing. The course reopened in March 2007 in time to host the inaugural Honda LPGA Thailand.

Following the successful relaunch of the Old Course, Siam Motors Group initiated a multi-phase expansion within the Chonburi property. In 2008, a 27-hole layout named the Plantation course was constructed on an adjacent tract of former agricultural land. This was followed by a 1.32 billion baht investment to build the Waterside course, which opened in 2014. A fourth 18-hole layout, Rolling Hills, was added to the complex in 2020.

== Courses ==
Siam Country Club currently operates a total of 81 holes across its four distinct Chonburi courses.

=== Old Course ===
The original 18-hole, par-72 course was designed by Japanese architect Ichisuke Izumi and opened in 1971. Following the 2006–2007 redesign by Lee Schmidt and Brian Curley, it plays to approximately 7,162 yards. It features a traditional parkland layout routed through mature trees and has served as the exclusive host of the Honda LPGA Thailand. The course also hosted the Thailand Open in 1973, 1978 and 1984.

=== Plantation ===
Opened in 2008, the Plantation course is a 27-hole facility designed by Schmidt-Curley Design. It is constructed on a former pineapple plantation and is characterised by significant elevation changes, wide fairways, and extensive, rugged bunkering. The layout is divided into three nine-hole loops: Sugar Cane, Tapioca, and Pineapple. The course hosted the Thailand Open in 2015, when the tournament was co-sanctioned by the Japan Golf Tour and the OneAsia Tour.

=== Waterside ===
Opened in 2014, the 18-hole Waterside course was designed by IMG Golf Course Design. The routing navigates around several large reservoirs and lakes, presenting a flatter, water-focused architectural style compared to the elevated terrain of the adjacent Old and Plantation courses.

=== Rolling Hills ===
Opened in 2020, Rolling Hills is an 18-hole course also designed by Schmidt-Curley Design. The course blends traditional elements with modern strategic features, the most prominent being the par-5 15th hole, which incorporates a steep, deep bunker complex formally described by the architects as the "Wall of Death".

== Tournaments hosted ==
Siam Country Club has hosted several professional and amateur golf tournaments, including:

- Honda LPGA Thailand – An LPGA Tour event regularly held at the club since 2007, primarily on the Old Course. The 2009 edition was played on the Plantation Course.
- Thailand Open – The Old Course hosted the tournament in 1973, 1978 and 1984, while the Plantation Course hosted the 2015 edition, which was co-sanctioned by the OneAsia Tour and the Japan Golf Tour.
- Trust Golf Asian Mixed Series – The Waterside Course hosted two mixed professional tournaments in 2022: the Trust Golf Asian Mixed Cup and the Trust Golf Asian Mixed Stableford Challenge. Both events were co-sanctioned by the Asian Tour and the Ladies European Tour. The Asian Mixed Cup was won by Thai amateur Ratchanon Chantananuwat.
- Women's Amateur Asia-Pacific – The Waterside Course hosted the regional women's amateur championship in 2022 and 2024.
- 2025 SEA Games – The Rolling Hills Course hosted the golf competition during the 2025 SEA Games in December 2025.

== See also ==
- Golf in Thailand
