= March 2012 in sports =

<<	March 2012					>>
Su	Mo	Tu	We	Th	Fr	Sa
				1	2	3
4	5	6	7	8	9	10
11	12	13	14	15	16	17
18	19	20	21	22	23	24
25	26	27	28	29	30	31
Sports

This list shows notable sports-related deaths, events, and notable outcomes that occurred in March of 2012.

== Current sporting seasons ==
=== Auto racing 2012 ===
- World Rally Championship

=== Basketball 2012 ===
- NBA
- NCAA Division I men
- NCAA Division I women
- Euroleague
- EuroLeague Women
- Eurocup
- EuroChallenge
- ASEAN Basketball League
- Australia
- France
- Germany
- Greece
- Israel
- Italy
- Philippines
  - Commissioner's Cup
- Russia
- Spain
- Turkey

=== Cricket 2012 ===
- Australia:
  - Sheffield Shield
  - Ryobi One-Day Cup

=== Football (soccer) 2012 ===
National teams competitions

- 2014 FIFA World Cup qualification
- UEFA Women's Euro 2013 qualifying

International clubs competitions

- UEFA (Europe) Champions League
- UEFA Europa League
- UEFA Women's Champions League
- Copa Libertadores (South America)
- CONCACAF (North & Central America) Champions League
- OFC (Oceania) Champions League

Domestic (national) competitions

- Australia
- England
- France
- Germany
- Iran
- Italy
- Portugal
- Russia
- Scotland
- Spain

=== Ice hockey 2012 ===
- National Hockey League
- Kontinental Hockey League
- Czech Extraliga
- Elitserien
- Canadian Hockey League:
  - OHL, QMJHL, WHL
- NCAA Division I men
- NCAA Division I women

=== Rugby union 2012 ===
- Heineken Cup
- Amlin Challenge Cup
- Aviva Premiership
- RaboDirect Pro12
- LV= Cup
- Top 14
- Sevens World Series

=== Snooker 2012 ===
- Players Tour Championship

=== Tennis 2012 ===
- ATP World Tour
- WTA Tour

=== Volleyball 2012 ===
International clubs competitions

- Men's CEV Champions League
- Women's CEV Champions League

=== Winter sports ===
- Alpine Skiing World Cup
- Biathlon World Cup
- Bobsleigh World Cup
- Cross-Country Skiing World Cup
- Freestyle Skiing World Cup
- Luge World Cup
- Nordic Combined World Cup
- Short Track Speed Skating World Cup
- Skeleton World Cup
- Ski Jumping World Cup
- Snowboard World Cup
- Speed Skating World Cup

== Days of the month ==
=== March 31, 2012 (Saturday) ===
==== Football (soccer) ====
- OFC Women's Pre-Olympic Football Tournament Final Stage, first leg: New Zealand 8–0 Papua New Guinea
- UEFA Women's Euro 2013 qualifying:
  - Group 1:
    - Russia 8–0 North Macedonia
    - Greece 1–1 Poland
    - Italy 4–0 Bosnia and Herzegovina
  - Group 2:
    - Romania 3–0 Kazakhstan
    - Germany 5–0 Spain
    - Switzerland 5–0 Turkey
  - Group 3: Bulgaria 0–3 Norway
  - Group 4: France 2–0 Scotland
  - Group 5: Slovakia 0–1 Finland
  - Group 6: Croatia 0–6 England
  - Group 7: Portugal 2–5 Czech Republic

=== March 30, 2012 (Friday) ===
==== Baseball ====
- Nippon Professional Baseball season opening games:
  - Central League:
    - Chunichi Dragons 4, Hiroshima Toyo Carp 2
    - Hanshin Tigers 5, Yokohama DeNA BayStars 5 (F/10)
    - Tokyo Yakult Swallows 4, Yomiuri Giants 0
  - Pacific League:
    - Chiba Lotte Marines 5, Tohoku Rakuten Golden Eagles 3
    - Fukuoka SoftBank Hawks 3, Orix Buffaloes 1
    - Hokkaido Nippon-Ham Fighters 9, Saitama Seibu Lions 1

==== Basketball ====
- Euroleague Quarterfinals Game 4 (teams in **bold** qualify for the Final Four):
  - Gescrap Bizkaia (Spain) 71–73 (Russia) **CSKA Moscow**. CSKA Moscow win series 3–1.
  - **Olympiacos** (Greece) 76–69 (Italy) Montepaschi Siena. Olympiacos win series 3–1.

=== March 29, 2012 (Thursday) ===
==== Baseball ====
- Major League Baseball Japan Opening Series, Game 2 in Tokyo: Oakland Athletics 4, Seattle Mariners 1

==== Basketball ====
- Euroleague Quarterfinals Game 4: Maccabi Tel Aviv (Israel) 69–78 (Greece) Panathinaikos

==== Football (soccer) ====
- UEFA Europa League quarter-finals, first leg:
  - AZ (Netherlands) 2–1 (Spain) Valencia
  - Schalke 04 (Germany) 2–4 (Spain) Athletic Bilbao
  - Sporting CP (Portugal) 2–1 (Ukraine) Metalist Kharkiv
  - Atlético Madrid (Spain) 2–1 (Germany) Hannover 96
- Copa Libertadores second stage, matchday 4:
  - Group 4:
    - Boca Juniors (Argentina) 2–0 (Argentina) Arsenal
    - Zamora (Venezuela) 0–1 (Brazil) Fluminense
- AFC Olympic Qualifiers Playoff Round, matchday 3 in Hanoi, Vietnam: Oman 2–0 Uzbekistan
  - Oman qualify for the AFC–CAF Olympic play-off against Senegal on April 23.

=== March 28, 2012 (Wednesday) ===
==== Baseball ====
- Major League Baseball Japan Opening Series, Game 1 in Tokyo: Seattle Mariners 3, Oakland Athletics 1 (F/11)

==== Basketball ====
- Euroleague Quarterfinals Game 3:
  - Gescrap Bizkaia (Spain) 94–81 (Russia) CSKA Moscow
  - Olympiacos (Greece) 75–55 (Italy) Montepaschi Siena

==== Football (soccer) ====
- UEFA Champions League quarter-finals, first leg:
  - Marseille (France) 0–2 (Germany) Bayern Munich
  - Milan (Italy) 0–0 (Spain) Barcelona
- Copa Libertadores second stage:
  - Group 2: Olimpia (Paraguay) 3–2 (Brazil) Flamengo
  - Group 3: Universidad Católica (Chile) 2–1 (Chile) Unión Española
  - Group 7: Defensor Sporting (Uruguay) 1–0 (Mexico) Guadalajara
- CONCACAF Champions League semifinals, first leg:
  - Toronto FC (Canada) 1–1 (Mexico) Santos Laguna
  - Monterrey (Mexico) 3–0 (Mexico) UNAM

=== March 27, 2012 (Tuesday) ===
==== Basketball ====
- Euroleague Quarterfinals Game 3 (team in **bold** qualify for the Final Four):
  - Maccabi Tel Aviv (Israel) 65–62 (Greece) Panathinaikos
  - UNICS Kazan (Russia) 56–67 (Spain) **FC Barcelona Regal**. FC Barcelona Regal win series 3–0.

==== Football (soccer) ====
- UEFA Champions League quarter-finals, first leg:
  - APOEL (Cyprus) 0–3 (Spain) Real Madrid
  - Benfica (Portugal) 0–1 (England) Chelsea
- Copa Libertadores second stage:
  - Group 5: Nacional (Uruguay) 1–0 (Peru) Alianza Lima
  - Group 6: Deportivo Táchira (Venezuela) 0–0 (Paraguay) Nacional
  - Group 8: Universidad de Chile 2–1 (Uruguay) Peñarol
- AFC Olympic Qualifiers Playoff Round, matchday 2 in Hanoi, Vietnam: Uzbekistan 2–1 Syria
- CONCACAF Men's Olympic Qualifying Tournament, group stage, matchday 3 (teams in **bold** advance to the semifinals):
  - Group B in Carson, California:
    - **Honduras** 2–0 Trinidad and Tobago
    - **Mexico** 1–0 Panama
      - Standings: Mexico 9 points, Honduras 6, Panama, Trinidad and Tobago 1.

=== March 26, 2012 (Monday) ===
==== Football (soccer) ====
- CONCACAF Men's Olympic Qualifying Tournament, group stage, matchday 3:
  - Group A in Nashville, Tennessee (teams in **bold** advance to the semifinals):
    - **Canada** 1–1 Cuba
    - United States 3–3 **El Salvador**
      - Standings: El Salvador, Canada 5 points, United States 4, Cuba 1.

=== March 25, 2012 (Sunday) ===
==== Auto racing ====
- Formula One:
  - Malaysian Grand Prix in Sepang, Malaysia: (1) Fernando Alonso (ESP) (Ferrari) (2) Sergio Pérez (MEX) (Sauber–Ferrari) (3) Lewis Hamilton (GBR) (McLaren–Mercedes)

==== Boxing ====
- Oceania Olympic Qualification Tournament:
  - Light flyweight: **Billy Ward** (AUS) def. Charlie Keama (PNG) 21–19. Ward qualifies for the Olympics.
  - Flyweight: **Jackson Woods** (AUS) def. Kauko Raka (PNG) by RSC. Woods qualifies for the Olympics.
  - Bantamweight: **Ibrahim Balla** (AUS) def. Gage Brown (NZL) 19–8. Balla qualifies for the Olympics.
  - Lightweight: **Luke Jackson** (AUS) def. Chad Milnes (NZL) 18–5. Jackson qualifies for the Olympics.
  - Light welterweight: **Jeff Horn** (AUS) def. Hinoma Livai (SAM) by RSC. Horn qualifies for the Olympics.
  - Welterweight: **Cameron Hammond** (AUS) def. Bowen Morgan (NZL) 19–8. Hammond qualifies for the Olympics.
  - Middleweight: **Jesse Ross** (AUS) def. Andrew Kometa (KIR) 17–7. Ross qualifies for the Olympics.
  - Heavyweight: **Jai Opetaia** (AUS) def. David Light (NZL) 15–10. Opetaia qualifies for the Olympics.
  - Super heavyweight: **Johan Linde** (AUS) def. Uaine Fa (TGA) by RSCH. Linde qualifies for the Olympics.

==== Field hockey ====
- Women's Olympic Qualifying tournament in Kontich, Belgium:
  - Third place game: (bronze) **Spain** 5–1 Russia
  - Final: (gold) **Belgium** 4–1 (silver) Ireland
    - Belgium qualify for the Olympics.

==== Football (soccer) ====
- AFC Olympic Qualifiers Playoff Round, matchday 1 in Hanoi, Vietnam: Syria 1–1 Oman
- CONCACAF Men's Olympic Qualifying Tournament, group stage, matchday 2:
  - Group B in Carson, California:
    - Panama 1–1 Trinidad and Tobago
    - Mexico 3–0 Honduras

==== Sumo ====
- Haru basho (March grand tournament) in Osaka, Japan:
  - Hakuhō Shō defeats Kakuryū Rikisaburō in a playoff to win the tournament, and wins his 22nd makuuchi (top division) championship to tie former yokozuna Takanohana Kōji for 5th on the all-time list.
  - Despite losing in the playoff, Kakuryū achieves the de facto necessary number of 33 wins over the last three tournaments to be promoted to ōzeki.

=== March 24, 2012 (Saturday) ===
==== Football (soccer) ====
- CONCACAF Men's Olympic Qualifying Tournament, group stage, matchday 2:
  - Group A in Nashville, Tennessee:
    - Cuba 0–4 El Salvador
    - United States 0–2 Canada
- OFC Men's Pre-Olympic Tournament in Taupo, New Zealand:
  - Bronze medal match: Papua New Guinea 0–1 (bronze) **Vanuatu**
  - Final: (silver) Fiji 0–1 (gold) **New Zealand**
    - New Zealand qualify for the Olympics.
- (Belgium) Belgian Cup Final: **Lokeren** 1–0 Kortrijk
  - Lokeren win the Belgian Cup for the first time.

=== March 23, 2012 (Friday) ===
==== Basketball ====
- Euroleague Quarterfinals Game 2:
  - CSKA Moscow (Russia) 79–60 (Spain) Gescrap Bizkaia
  - Montepaschi Siena (Italy) 81–80 (Greece) Olympiacos

==== Field hockey ====
- Women's Olympic Qualifying tournament in Kontich, Belgium, day 5:
  - France 5–4 Mexico
  - Spain 1–1 Russia
  - Belgium 1–1 Ireland
    - Standings: Belgium, Ireland 13 points, Spain, Russia 7, France 3, Mexico 0.

==== Football (soccer) ====
- CONCACAF Men's Olympic Qualifying Tournament, group stage, matchday 1:
  - Group B in Carson, California:
    - Honduras 3–1 Panama
    - Trinidad and Tobago 1–7 Mexico

=== March 22, 2012 (Thursday) ===
==== Basketball ====
- Euroleague Quarterfinals Game 2:
  - Panathinaikos (Greece) 92–94 (OT) (Israel) Maccabi Tel Aviv
  - FC Barcelona Regal (Spain) 66–63 (Russia) UNICS Kazan
- (Israel) Israeli Women's Cup Final: **Maccabi Bnot Ashdod** 63–50 Elektra Ramat HaSharon
  - Maccabi Bnot Ashdod win their first trophy, and the first ever major team sport title for a team from Ashdod.

==== Curling ====
- World Women's Championship in Lethbridge, Alberta, Canada:
  - Draw 15:
  - Draw 16:
  - Draw 17:

==== Field hockey ====
- Women's Olympic Qualifying tournament in Kontich, Belgium, day 4:
  - Russia 5–1 Mexico
  - Ireland 3–2 Spain
  - France 0–4 Belgium

==== Football (soccer) ====
- CONCACAF Men's Olympic Qualifying Tournament, group stage, matchday 1:
  - Group A in Nashville, Tennessee:
    - El Salvador 0–0 Canada
    - United States 6–0 Cuba
- UEFA Women's Champions League quarterfinals, second leg (first leg score in parentheses): Rossiyanka (Russia) – (0–2) (Germany) Turbine Potsdam
- Copa Libertadores second stage:
  - Group 1: Santos (Brazil) 2–0 (Peru) Juan Aurich
  - Group 7: Deportivo Quito (Ecuador) 1–0 (Argentina) Vélez Sársfield
  - Group 8: Atlético Nacional (Colombia) 2–2 (Argentina) Godoy Cruz

==== Snooker ====
- Championship League Final group in Stock, England:

=== March 21, 2012 (Wednesday) ===
==== Basketball ====
- Euroleague Quarterfinals Game 1:
  - CSKA Moscow (Russia) 98–71 (Spain) Gescrap Bizkaia
  - Montepaschi Siena (Italy) 75–82 (Greece) Olympiacos

==== Curling ====
- World Women's Championship in Lethbridge, Alberta, Canada:
  - Draw 12:
  - Draw 13:
  - Draw 14:

==== Football (soccer) ====
- OFC Men's Pre-Olympic Tournament in Taupo, New Zealand (teams in **bold** advance to the semifinals):
  - Group A:
    - American Samoa 1–16 Solomon Islands
    - **Fiji** 2–1 **Vanuatu**
      - Standings: Fiji 9 points, Vanuatu 6, Solomon Islands 3, American Samoa 0.
  - Group B: Tonga 0–10 **New Zealand**
    - Standings: New Zealand 6 points, **Papua New Guinea** 3, Tonga 0.
- UEFA Women's Champions League quarterfinals, second leg (first leg scores in parentheses):
  - **1. FFC Frankfurt** (Germany) 3–0 (0–1) (Sweden) LdB Malmö. 1. FFC Frankfurt win 3–1 on aggregate.
  - Brøndby IF (Denmark) 0–4 (0–4) (France) **Lyon**. Lyon win 8–0 on aggregate.
  - Göteborg (Sweden) 1–0 (1–3) (England) **Arsenal**. Arsenal win 3–2 on aggregate.
- Copa Libertadores second stage:
  - Group 1: The Strongest (Bolivia) 1–1 (Brazil) Internacional
  - Group 5: Vasco da Gama (Brazil) 2–0 (Paraguay) Libertad
  - Group 6: Corinthians (Brazil) 1–0 (Mexico) Cruz Azul
- AFC Champions League group stage:
  - Group C:
    - Al-Nasr (United Arab Emirates) 2–1 (Qatar) Lekhwiya
    - Al-Ahli (Saudi Arabia) 1–1 (Iran) Sepahan
  - Group D:
    - Persepolis (Iran) 6–1 (United Arab Emirates) Al-Shabab
    - Al-Gharafa (Qatar) 3–3 (Saudi Arabia) Al-Hilal
  - Group G:
    - Central Coast Mariners (Australia) 1–1 (Japan) Nagoya Grampus
    - Seongnam Ilhwa Chunma (South Korea) 1–1 (China) Tianjin Teda
  - Group H:
    - Kashiwa Reysol (Japan) 5–1 (South Korea) Jeonbuk Hyundai Motors
    - Guangzhou Evergrande (China) 1–2 (Thailand) Buriram United
- AFC Cup group stage:
  - Group C:
    - VB (Maldives) 2–2 Al-Kuwait
    - Al-Ettifaq (Saudi Arabia) 0–0 (Lebanon) Al-Ahed
  - Group D:
    - Salgaocar (India) 2–2 (Uzbekistan) Neftchi Farg'ona
    - Al-Wehdat (Jordan) 2–1 (Oman) Al-Oruba
  - Group G:
    - Chonburi (Thailand) 1–0 (Singapore) Home United
    - Citizen (Hong Kong) 2–1 (Myanmar) Yangon United
  - Group H:
    - Ayeyawady United (Myanmar) 3–1 (Malaysia) Kelantan
    - Navibank Sài Gòn (Vietnam) 3–1 (Indonesia) Arema

=== March 20, 2012 (Tuesday) ===
==== Basketball ====
- Euroleague Quarterfinals Game 1:
  - Panathinaikos (Greece) 93–73 (Israel) Maccabi Tel Aviv
  - FC Barcelona Regal (Spain) 78–66 (Russia) UNICS Kazan

==== Curling ====
- World Women's Championship in Lethbridge, Alberta, Canada:
  - Draw 9:
  - Draw 10:
  - Draw 11:

==== Field hockey ====
- Women's Olympic Qualifying Tournament in Kontich, Belgium, matchday 3:
  - Mexico 0–5 Ireland
  - Russia 3–2 France
  - Belgium 1–0 Spain

==== Football (soccer) ====
- AFC Champions League group stage Matchday 2:
  - Group A:
    - Esteghlal (Iran) 0–0 (Uzbekistan) Nasaf Qarshi
    - Al-Jazira (United Arab Emirates) 3–2 (Qatar) Al-Rayyan
  - Group B:
    - Pakhtakor (Uzbekistan) 1–1 (United Arab Emirates) Bani Yas
    - Al-Arabi (Qatar) 1–3 (Saudi Arabia) Al-Ittihad
  - Group E:
    - Adelaide United (Australia) 2–0 (Japan) Gamba Osaka
    - Pohang Steelers (South Korea) 0–2 (Uzbekistan) Bunyodkor
  - Group F:
    - FC Tokyo (Japan) 2–2 (South Korea) Ulsan Hyundai
    - Beijing Guoan (China) 1–1 (Australia) Brisbane Roar
- AFC Cup group stage Matchday 2:
  - Group A:
    - Al-Suwaiq (Oman) 0–0 (Jordan) Al-Faisaly
    - Al-Ittihad (Syria) 1–0 (Kuwait) Al-Qadsia
  - Group B:
    - Al-Oruba (Yemen) 2–2 (Iraq) Arbil
    - Kazma (Kuwait) 3–0 (India) East Bengal
  - Group E:
    - Al-Zawra'a (Iraq) 5–0 (Yemen) Al-Tilal
    - Safa (Lebanon) 0–2 (Syria) Al-Shorta
  - Group F:
    - Terengganu (Malaysia) 0–2 (Hong Kong) Kitchee
    - Tampines Rovers (Singapore) 0–0 (Vietnam) Sông Lam Nghệ An
- Copa Libertadores second stage:
  - Group 2: Emelec (Ecuador) 0–2 (Argentina) Lanús
  - Group 3: Bolívar (Bolivia) 2–1 (Colombia) Junior

==== Snooker ====
- Championship League Group seven in Stock, England:

=== March 19, 2012 (Monday) ===
==== Curling ====
- World Women's Championship in Lethbridge, Alberta, Canada:
  - Draw 6:
  - Draw 7:
  - Draw 8:

=== March 18, 2012 (Sunday) ===
==== Alpine skiing ====
- World Cup Final in Schladming, Austria:
  - Men's slalom: (gold) André Myhrer (SWE) (silver) Felix Neureuther (GER) (bronze) Mario Matt (AUT)
    - Slalom standings: (1) Myhrer 644 points (2) Ivica Kostelić (CRO) 610 (3) Marcel Hirscher (AUT) 560
      - Myhrer wins his first World Cup title.
    - Overall standings: (1) Hirscher 1355 points (2) Beat Feuz (SWI) 1330 (3) Aksel Lund Svindal (NOR) 1131
      - Hirscher wins his first overall World Cup title.
  - Women's giant slalom: (gold) Viktoria Rebensburg (GER) (silver) Anna Fenninger (AUT) (bronze) Federica Brignone (ITA)
    - Giant slalom standings: (1) Rebensburg 650 points (2) Lindsey Vonn (USA) 455 (3) Tessa Worley (FRA) 446
      - Rebensburg wins her second giant slalom World Cup title.
    - Overall standings: (1) Vonn 1980 points (2) Tina Maze (SLO) 1402 (3) Maria Höfl-Riesch (GER) 1227
      - Vonn wins her fourth overall World Cup title, and her 16th World Cup title.

==== Auto racing ====
- Formula One:
  - Australian Grand Prix in Albert Park, Australia: (1) Jenson Button (GBR) (McLaren–Mercedes) (2) Sebastian Vettel (GER) (Red Bull–Renault) (3) Lewis Hamilton (GBR) (McLaren-Mercedes)
- Sprint Cup Series:
  - Food City 500 in Bristol, Tennessee (all USA): (1) Brad Keselowski (Dodge; Penske Racing) (2) Matt Kenseth (Ford; Roush Fenway Racing) (3) Martin Truex Jr. (Toyota; Michael Waltrip Racing)

==== Biathlon ====
- World Cup 9 in Khanty-Mansiysk, Russia:
  - Men's 15 km Mass Start:
  - Women's 12.5 km Mass Start:

==== Cross-country skiing ====
- World Cup in Falun, Sweden:
  - Men's 15 km Free Handicap Start:
  - Women's 10 km Free Handicap Start:

==== Curling ====
- World Women's Championship in Lethbridge, Alberta, Canada:
  - Draw 3:
  - Draw 4:
  - Draw 5:

==== Field hockey ====
- Men's Olympic Qualifying Tournament 2 in Dublin, Ireland:
  - Third place game: (bronze) **Malaysia** 6–1 Russia
  - Final: (gold) **South Korea** 3–2 (silver) Ireland
    - South Korea qualify for the Olympics.
- Women's Olympic Qualifying Tournament in Kontich, Belgium, matchday 2:
  - Spain 2–1 France
  - Ireland 3–0 Russia
  - Mexico 0–12 Belgium

==== Football (soccer) ====
- OFC Men's Pre-Olympic Tournament in Taupo, New Zealand:
  - Group A:
    - American Samoa 1–7 Fiji
    - Solomon Islands 0–1 Vanuatu
  - Group B: Papua New Guinea 3–0 Tonga
- CAF Champions League Preliminary round, second leg (first leg score in parentheses): Athlético Olympic (Burundi) 4–1 (0–5) (Democratic Republic of the Congo) **AS Vita Club**. AS Vita Club win 6–4 on aggregate.

==== Freestyle skiing ====
- World Cup in Megève, France:
  - Men's Moguls:
  - Women's Moguls:

==== Golf ====
- PGA Tour:
  - Transitions Championship in Palm Harbor, Florida:
- European Tour:
  - Open de Andalucia de Golf in Andalusia, Spain:
- LPGA Tour:
  - RR Donnelley LPGA Founders Cup in Phoenix, Arizona:
- Champions Tour:
  - Toshiba Classic in Newport Beach, California:

==== Ski jumping ====
- Men's World Cup in Planica, Slovenia:
  - HS 215 (Ski flying):

==== Snooker ====
- Players Tour Championship Finals in Galway, Ireland:
  - Final: **Stephen Lee** (ENG) 4–0 Neil Robertson (AUS)

==== Tennis ====
- ATP World Tour:
  - BNP Paribas Open in Indian Wells, California, United States:
    - Final: **Roger Federer** (SUI) def. John Isner (USA) 7–6(9–7), 6–3
      - Federer wins his third title of the year and 73rd of his career, his fourth win at Indian Wells, also winning in 2004, 2005, and 2006, and his 19th career Masters win, tying the record held by Rafael Nadal.
- WTA Tour:
  - BNP Paribas Open in Indian Wells, California, United States:
    - Final: **Victoria Azarenka** (BLR) def. Maria Sharapova (RUS) 6–2, 6–3
      - Azarenka wins her fourth title of the year and 12th of her career. She is now 23–0 for the year. It's her third career Premier Mandatory event and seventh Premier overall.

=== March 17, 2012 (Saturday) ===
==== Alpine skiing ====
- World Cup Final in Schladming, Austria:
  - Men's giant slalom: (gold) Marcel Hirscher (AUT) 2:25.53 (silver) Hannes Reichelt (AUT) 2:25.79 (bronze) Marcel Mathis (AUT) 2:26.08
    - Giant slalom standings: (1) Hirscher 705 points (2) Ted Ligety (USA) 513 (3) Massimiliano Blardone (ITA) 408
      - Hirscher wins his first giant slalom World Cup title.
  - Women's slalom: (gold) Michaela Kirchgasser (AUT) 1:32.57 (silver) Veronika Zuzulová (SVK) 1:32.69 (bronze) Marlies Schild (AUT) 1:33.08
    - Slalom standings: (1) Schild 760 points (2) Kirchgasser 452 (3) Tina Maze (SLO) 413
      - Schild wins her fourth Slalom World Cup title.

==== Auto racing ====
- Nationwide Series:
  - Ford EcoBoost 300 at Bristol, Tennessee:

==== Biathlon ====
- World Cup 9 in Khanty-Mansiysk, Russia:
  - Men's 12.5 km Pursuit:
  - Women's 10 km Pursuit:

==== Cricket ====
- South Africa in New Zealand:
  - 2nd Test in Hamilton: New Zealand 185 & 168; South Africa 253 & 103/1. **South Africa win by 9 wickets**.

==== Cross-country skiing ====
- World Cup in Falun, Sweden:
  - Men's 15 km Classic Mass Start: (gold) Dario Cologna (SUI) 43:14.9 (silver) Eldar Rønning (NOR) 43:15.3 (bronze) Len Valjas (CAN) 43:16.2
  - Women's 10 km Classic Mass Start:

==== Curling ====
- World Women's Championship in Lethbridge, Alberta, Canada:
  - Draw 1:
    - Denmark – Germany
    - Italy – Sweden
    - South Korea – Czech Republic
    - Scotland – Russia
  - Draw 2:
    - Czech Republic – Italy
    - Canada – United States
    - Switzerland – China
    - South Korea – Sweden

==== Cycling ====
- UCI World Tour:
  - Milan–San Remo:

==== Field hockey ====
- Men's Olympic Qualifying Tournament in Dublin, Ireland, matchday 5:
  - South Korea 5–1 Russia
  - Chile 4–2 Ukraine
  - Ireland 1–1 Malaysia
    - Standings: Korea 13 points, Ireland 11, Malaysia 10, Russia 6, Chile 3, Ukraine 0.
- Women's Olympic Qualifying Tournament in Kontich, Belgium, matchday 1:
  - Spain 7–0 Mexico
  - Ireland 5–1 France
  - Belgium 4–0 Russia

==== Freestyle skiing ====
- World Cup in Myrkdalen-Voss, Norway:
  - Men's Aerials:
  - Women's Aerials:

==== Rugby union ====
- Six Nations Championship Week 5:
  - Italy 13–6 Scotland in Rome
  - Wales 16–9 France in Cardiff
  - England 30–9 Ireland in London
    - Standings: Wales 10 points, England 8, Ireland, France 5, Italy 2, Scotland 0.
    - Wales win the Championship for the 25th time.

==== Ski jumping ====
- Men's World Cup in Planica, Slovenia:
  - HS 215 Team (Ski flying):

==== Snowboarding ====
- World Cup in Valmalenco, Italy:
  - Men's giant slalom:
  - Women's giant slalom:

=== March 16, 2012 (Friday) ===
==== Alpine skiing ====
- World Cup Final in Schladming, Austria:
  - Team Event: (gold) Austria (silver) Switzerland (bronze) Sweden

==== Biathlon ====
- World Cup 9 in Khanty-Mansiysk, Russia:
  - Men's 10 km Sprint: (gold) Martin Fourcade (FRA) 26:40.2 (0+0) (silver) Arnd Peiffer (GER) 26:45.5 (0+1) (bronze) Fredrik Lindström (SWE) 26:46.9 (0+0)
    - Sprint standings: (1) Fourcade 423 points (2) Emil Hegle Svendsen (NOR) 378 (3) Carl Johan Bergman (SWE) 287
      - Fourcade wins his first Sprint World Cup title.
  - Women's 7.5 km Sprint: (gold) Magdalena Neuner (GER) 22:11.5 (1+1) (silver) Vita Semerenko (UKR) 22:14.7 (0+0) (bronze) Darya Domracheva (BLR) 22:27.7 (0+1)
    - Sprint standings: (1) Neuner 571 points (2) Domracheva 471 (3) Kaisa Mäkäräinen (FIN) 401
      - Neuner wins her second consecutive, and third overall, Sprint World Cup title.

==== Cross-country skiing ====
- World Cup in Falun, Sweden:
  - Men's 3.75 km Free Individual: (gold) Alex Harvey (CAN) 8:16.8 (silver) Dario Cologna (SUI) 8:17.0 (bronze) Devon Kershaw (CAN) 8:19.9
  - Women's 2.5 km Free Individual: (gold) Marit Bjørgen (NOR) 6:54.4 (silver) Charlotte Kalla (SWE) 7:00.6 (bronze) Marthe Kristoffersen (NOR) 7:05.8

==== Football (soccer) ====
- OFC Men's Pre-Olympic Tournament in Taupo, New Zealand:
  - Group A:
    - Solomon Islands 0–2 Fiji
    - Vanuatu 8–0 American Samoa
  - Group B: New Zealand 1–0 Papua New Guinea

==== Horse racing ====
- Cheltenham Gold Cup in Cheltenham, United Kingdom: (gold) Synchronised (trainer: Jonjo O'Neill, jockey: Tony McCoy) (silver) The Giant Bolster (trainer: David Bridgwater, jockey: Tom Scudamore) (bronze) Long Run (trainer: Nicky Henderson, jockey: Sam Waley-Cohen)

==== Ski jumping ====
- Men's World Cup in Planica, Slovenia:
  - HS 215 (Ski flying): (gold) Robert Kranjec (SLO) 434.3 points (silver) Simon Ammann (SUI) 423.4 (bronze) Martin Koch (AUT) 418.6

==== Snowboarding ====
- World Cup in Valmalenco, Italy:
  - Men's Snowboard Cross: (gold) Konstantin Schad (GER) (silver) Andrey Boldykov (RUS) (bronze) Lluis Marin Tarroch (AND)
    - Snowboard Cross Standings: (1) Pierre Vaultier (FRA) 3852 points (2) Boldykov 2930 (3) Nate Holland (USA) 2340
      - Vaultier wins his third World Cup Snowboard Cross title.
  - Women's Snowboard Cross: (gold) Jacqueline Hernandez (USA) (silver) Nelly Moenne Loccoz (FRA) (bronze) Zoe Gillings (GBR)
    - Snowboard Cross Standings: (1) Dominique Maltais (CAN) 4200 points (2) Maëlle Ricker (CAN) 3950 (3) Aleksandra Zhekova (BUL) 3760
      - Maltais win her second consecutive World Cup Snowboard Cross title.

=== March 15, 2012 (Thursday) ===
==== Alpine skiing ====
- World Cup Final in Schladming, Austria:
  - Men's Super-G: (gold) Christof Innerhofer (ITA) 1:21.24 (silver) Alexis Pinturault (FRA) 1:21.26 (bronze) Marcel Hirscher (AUT) 1:21.30
    - Super-G standings: (1) Aksel Lund Svindal (NOR) 413 points (2) Didier Cuche (SUI) 400 (3) Beat Feuz (SUI) 368
      - Svindal wins his third World Cup Super-G title.
  - Women's Super-G: (gold) Viktoria Rebensburg (GER) 1:24.54 (silver) Julia Mancuso (USA) 1:24.72 (bronze) Marion Rolland (FRA) 1:24.75
    - Super-G standings: (1) Lindsey Vonn (USA) 453 (2) Mancuso 381 (3) Anna Fenninger (AUT) 369
      - Vonn wins her fourth consecutive World Cup Super-G title.

==== Field hockey ====
- Men's Olympic Qualifying Tournament in Dublin, Ireland, matchday 4:
  - Russia 2–0 Ukraine
  - Malaysia 2–3 South Korea
  - Chile 0–3 Ireland

==== Football (soccer) ====
- UEFA Europa League Round of 16 second leg (first leg scores in parentheses):
  - **Hannover 96** (Germany) 4–0 (2–2) (Belgium) Standard Liège. Hannover 96 win 6–2 on aggregate.
  - PSV Eindhoven (Netherlands) 1–1 (2–4) (Spain) **Valencia**. Valencia win 5–3 on aggregate.
  - Udinese (Italy) 2–1 (0–2) (Netherlands) **AZ**. AZ win 3–2 on aggregate.
  - **Athletic Bilbao** (Spain) 2–1 (3–2) (England) Manchester United. Athletic Bilbao win 5–3 on aggregate.
  - Olympiacos (Greece) 1–2 (1–0) (Ukraine) **Metalist Kharkiv**. 2–2 on aggregate; Metalist Kharkiv win on away goals.
  - Manchester City (England) 3–2 (0–1) (Portugal) **Sporting CP**. 3–3 on aggregate; Sporting CP win on away goals.
  - **Schalke 04** (Germany) 4–1 (0–1) (Netherlands) Twente. Schalke 04 win 4–2 on aggregate.
  - Beşiktaş (Turkey) 0–3 (1–3) (Spain) **Atlético Madrid**. Atlético Madrid win 6–1 on aggregate.
- UEFA Women's Champions League quarterfinals first leg: LdB Malmö (Sweden) 1–0 (Germany) 1. FFC Frankfurt
- Copa Libertadores second stage:
  - Group 1: Juan Aurich (Peru) 1–3 (Brazil) Santos
  - Group 2: Flamengo (Brazil) 3–3 (Paraguay) Olimpia
- CONCACAF Champions League quarterfinals second leg (first leg score in parentheses): **UNAM** (Mexico) 8–0 (1–2) (El Salvador) Isidro Metapán. UNAM win 9–2 on aggregate.
- (Iran) Hazfi Cup Final: **Esteghlal** 0–0 (4–1 pen.) Shahin Bushehr
  - Esteghlal win the Cup for the sixth time.

=== March 14, 2012 (Wednesday) ===
==== Alpine skiing ====
- World Cup Final in Schladming, Austria:
  - Men's Downhill: (gold) Aksel Lund Svindal (NOR) 1:46.82 (silver) Beat Feuz (SUI) 1:47.38 (bronze) Hannes Reichelt (AUT) 1:47.48
    - Downhill standings: (1) Klaus Kröll (AUT) 605 points (2) Feuz 598 (3) Didier Cuche (SUI) 521
      - Kröll wins his first World Cup discipline title.
  - Women's Downhill: (gold) Lindsey Vonn (USA) 1:46.56 (silver) Marion Rolland (FRA) 1:47.48 (bronze) Tina Maze (SLO) 1:47.78
    - Downhill standings: (1) Vonn 690 points (2) Tina Weirather (LIE) 400 (3) Elisabeth Görgl (AUT) 384
      - Vonn wins her fifth successive World Cup downhill title.

==== Boxing ====
- The British Boxing Board of Control withdraws Derek Chisora's boxing licence following a brawl with David Haye in Munich, Germany.

==== Cross-country skiing ====
- World Cup Final in Stockholm, Sweden:
  - Men's Sprint Classic: (gold) Eirik Brandsdal (NOR) (silver) Teodor Peterson (SWE) (bronze) Len Valjas (CAN)
    - Sprint standings: (1) Peterson 617 points (2) Nikolay Morilov (RUS) 494 (3) Brandsdal 483
      - Peterson wins his first discipline world title.
  - Women's Sprint Classic: (gold) Marit Bjørgen (NOR) (silver) Julia Ivanova (RUS) (bronze) Maiken Caspersen Falla (NOR)
    - Sprint standings: (1) Kikkan Randall (USA) 658 points (2) Falla 536 (3) Bjørgen 521
      - Randall wins her first discipline world title.

==== Football (soccer) ====
- 2012 Olympics Men's Asian qualifiers preliminary round 3, Matchday 6 (teams in **bold** qualify for the Summer Olympics; teams in italics advance to the Playoff Round):
  - Group A:
    - Saudi Arabia 1–1 Oman
    - **South Korea** 0–0 Qatar
      - Standings: South Korea 12 points, Oman 8, Qatar 7, Saudi Arabia 3.
  - Group B:
    - Uzbekistan 2–3 **United Arab Emirates**
    - Australia 0–0 Iraq
      - Standings: United Arab Emirates 14 points, Uzbekistan 8, Iraq 5, Australia 4.
  - Group C:
    - Syria 3–0 Malaysia
    - **Japan** 2–0 Bahrain
      - Standings: Japan 15 points, Syria 12, Bahrain 9, Malaysia 0.
- UEFA Champions League Round of 16 second leg (first leg scores in parentheses):
  - **Chelsea** (England) 4–1 (a.e.t.) (1–3) (Italy) Napoli. Chelsea win 5–4 on aggregate.
  - **Real Madrid** (Spain) 4–1 (1–1) (Russia) CSKA Moscow. Real Madrid win 5–2 on aggregate.
- UEFA Women's Champions League quarterfinals first leg:
  - Arsenal (England) 3–1 (Sweden) Göteborg
  - Turbine Potsdam (Germany) 2–0 (Russia) Rossiyanka
  - Lyon (France) 4–0 (Denmark) Brøndby IF
- Copa Libertadores second stage:
  - Group 4:
    - Arsenal (Argentina) 1–2 (Argentina) Boca Juniors
    - Fluminense (Brazil) 1–0 (Venezuela) Zamora
  - Group 5: Libertad (Paraguay) 1–1 (Brazil) Vasco da Gama
  - Group 6: Cruz Azul (Mexico) 0–0 (Brazil) Corinthians
- CONCACAF Champions League quarterfinals second leg (first leg scores in parentheses):
  - Santos Laguna (Mexico) – (1–2) (United States) Seattle Sounders FC
  - Los Angeles Galaxy (United States) – (2–2) (Canada) Toronto FC

==== Snowboarding ====
- World Cup in Valmalenco, Italy:
  - Men's Snowboard Cross:
  - Women's Snowboard Cross:

=== March 13, 2012 (Tuesday) ===
==== Cycling ====
- UCI World Tour:
  - Tirreno–Adriatico:

==== Field hockey ====
- Men's Olympic Qualifying Tournament in Dublin, Ireland, matchday 3:
  - Ukraine 1–5 Malaysia
  - Russia 4–3 Chile
  - Ireland 1–1 South Korea

==== Football (soccer) ====
- UEFA Champions League Round of 16 second leg (first leg scores in parentheses):
  - **Bayern Munich** (Germany) 7–0 (0–1) (Switzerland) Basel. Bayern Munich win 7–1 on aggregate.
  - Internazionale (Italy) 2–1 (0–1) (France) **Marseille**. 2–2 on aggregate; Marseille win on away goals.
- Copa Libertadores second stage:
  - Group 1: Internacional (Brazil) 5–0 (Bolivia) The Strongest
  - Group 2: Lanús (Argentina) 1–0 (Ecuador) Emelec
  - Group 5: Alianza Lima (Peru) 1–0 (Uruguay) Nacional
  - Group 6: Nacional (Paraguay) 3–2 (Venezuela) Deportivo Táchira
- CONCACAF Champions League quarterfinals second leg (first leg scores in parentheses): **Monterrey** (Mexico) 4–1 (3–1) (Mexico) Morelia. Monterrey win 7–2 on aggregate.

=== March 11, 2012 (Sunday) ===
==== Alpine skiing ====
- Men's World Cup in Kranjska Gora, Slovenia:
  - Slalom:

==== Athletics ====
- World Indoor Championships in Istanbul, Turkey:
  - Men's 800 metres: (gold) Mohammed Aman (ETH) 1:48.36 (silver) Jakub Holuša (CZE) 1:48.62 (bronze) Andrew Osagie (GBR) 1:48.92
  - Men's 3000 metres: (gold) Bernard Lagat (USA) 7:41.44 (silver) Augustine Kiprono Choge (KEN) 7:41.77 (bronze) Edwin Soi (KEN) 7:41.78
  - Men's 60 metres hurdles: (gold) Aries Merritt (USA) 7.44 (silver) Liu Xiang (CHN) 7.49 (bronze) Pascal Martinot-Lagarde (FRA) 7.53
  - Men's 4 × 400 metres relay: (gold) United States (Frankie Wright, Calvin Smith Jr., Manteo Mitchell, Gil Roberts) 3:03.94 (silver) United Kingdom (Conrad Williams, Nigel Levine, Michael Bingham, Richard Buck) 3:04.72 (bronze) Trinidad and Tobago (Lalonde Gordon, Renny Quow, Jereem Richards, Jarrin Solomon) 3:06.85
  - Men's triple jump: (gold) Will Claye (USA) 17.70 **WL** (silver) Christian Taylor (USA) 17.63 (bronze) Lyukman Adams (RUS) 17.36
  - Men's high jump: (gold) Dimitrios Chondrokoukis (GRE) 2.33 (silver) Andrey Silnov (RUS) 2.33 (bronze) Ivan Ukhov (RUS) 2.31
  - Women's 60 metres: (gold) Veronica Campbell Brown (JAM) 7.01 **WL** (silver) Murielle Ahouré (CIV) 7.04 (bronze) Tianna Madison (USA) 7.09
  - Women's 800 metres: (gold) Pamela Jelimo (KEN) 1:58.83 **WL** (silver) Nataliia Lupu (UKR) 1:59.67 (bronze) Erica Moore (USA) 1:59.97
  - Women's 3000 metres: (gold) Hellen Onsando Obiri (KEN) 8:37.16 (silver) Meseret Defar (ETH) 8:38.26 (bronze) Gelete Burka (ETH) 8:40.16
  - Women's 4 × 400 metres relay: (gold) Great Britain (Shana Cox, Nicola Sanders, Christine Ohuruogu, Perri Shakes-Drayton) 3:28.76 **WL** (silver) United States (Leslie Cole, Natasha Hastings, Jernail Hayes, Sanya Richards-Ross) 3:28.79 (bronze) Russia (Yuliya Gushchina, Kseniya Ustalova, Marina Karnaushchenko, Aleksandra Fedoriva) 3:29.55
  - Women's long jump: (gold) Brittney Reese (USA) 7.23 **CR** (silver) Janay DeLoach (USA) 6.98 (bronze) Shara Proctor (GBR) 6.89
  - Women's pole vault: (gold) Yelena Isinbayeva (RUS) 4.80 (silver) Vanessa Boslak (FRA) 4.70 (bronze) Holly Bleasdale (GBR) 4.70

==== Auto racing ====
- Sprint Cup Series:
  - Kobalt Tools 400 in Las Vegas, Nevada:
- World Rally Championship:
  - (Mexico) Rally México in León:
- World Touring Car Championship:
  - FIA WTCC Race of Italy in Monza, Italy:

==== Biathlon ====
- World Championships in Ruhpolding, Germany:
  - Men's 15 km Mass Start: (gold) Martin Fourcade (FRA) 38:25.4 (0+1+1+0) (silver) Björn Ferry (SWE) 38:28.4 (0+0+0+0) (bronze) Fredrik Lindström (SWE) 38:28.8 (0+1+1+0)
    - Fourcade wins his third title of the championships and fourth overall.
  - Women's 12.5 km Mass Start: (gold) Tora Berger (NOR) 35:41.6 (0+0+1+0) (silver) Marie-Laure Brunet (FRA) 35:49.7 (0+0+0+1) (bronze) Kaisa Mäkäräinen (FIN) 35:54.3 (0+0+0+1)
    - Berger wins her third title of the championships and fourth overall.

==== Cricket ====
- South Africa in New Zealand:
  - 1st Test in Dunedin: South Africa 238 (68.2 overs) & 435/5d (140 overs); New Zealand 273 (88.2 overs) & 137/2 (41 overs). **Match drawn**.

==== Cross-country skiing ====
- World Cup in Oslo, Norway:
  - 30 km Classic Mass Start women:

==== Curling ====
- World Junior Championships in Östersund, Sweden:
  - Men:
    - Bronze Medal Game: Norway 3–7 (bronze) **Scotland**
    - Gold Medal Game: (gold) **Canada** 10–4 (silver) Sweden
  - Women:
    - Bronze Medal Game: Sweden 4–7 (bronze) **Russia**
    - Gold Medal Game: (gold) **Scotland** 6–5 (silver) Czech Republic

==== Cycling ====
- UCI World Tour:
  - Paris–Nice:
- UCI Women's Road World Cup:
  - Ronde van Drenthe:

==== Field hockey ====
- Men's Olympic Qualifying Tournament in Dublin, Ireland, matchday 2:
  - Malaysia 6–2 Russia
  - Ukraine 0–12 Ireland
  - South Korea 6–1 Chile

==== Football (soccer) ====
- CONCACAF Under-20 Women's Championship in Panama City, Panama (teams in **bold** qualify for FIFA U-20 Women's World Cup):
  - Bronze medal match: **Mexico** 5–0 Panama
  - Final: **United States** 2–1 **Canada**
    - United States win the title for the third time.

==== Golf ====
- World Golf Championships:
  - WGC-Cadillac Championship in Doral, Florida:
- PGA Tour:
  - Puerto Rico Open in Río Grande, Puerto Rico:

==== Rugby union ====
- Six Nations Championship Week 4:
  - France 22–24 England in Saint-Denis

==== Short track speed skating ====
- World Championships in Shanghai, China:
  - Men overall: (gold) Kwak Yoon-Gy (KOR) 102 points (silver) Noh Jin-Kyu (KOR) 76 (bronze) Charles Hamelin (CAN) 52
  - Women overall: (gold) Li Jianrou (CHN) 60 points (silver) Valérie Maltais (CAN) 47 (bronze) Arianna Fontana (ITA) 44

==== Ski jumping ====
- Men's World Cup in Oslo, Norway:
  - HS 134:

==== Speed skating ====
- World Cup 7 in Berlin, Germany:

==== Wrestling ====
- European Championships in Belgrade, Serbia:

=== March 10, 2012 (Saturday) ===
==== Alpine skiing ====
- Men's World Cup in Kranjska Gora, Slovenia:
  - Giant slalom:
- Women's World Cup in Åre, Sweden:
  - Slalom:

==== Athletics ====
- World Indoor Championships in Istanbul, Turkey:
  - Men's 60 metres: (gold) Justin Gatlin (USA) 6.46 (silver) Nesta Carter (JAM) 6.54 (bronze) Dwain Chambers (GBR) 6.60
  - Men's 400 metres: (gold) Nery Brenes (CRC) 45.11 **CR** (silver) Demetrius Pinder (BAH) 45.34 (bronze) Chris Brown (BAH) 45.90
  - Men's 1500 metres: (gold) Abdalaati Iguider (MAR) 3:45.21 (silver) Ilham Tanui Özbilen (TUR) 3:45.35 (bronze) Mekonnen Gebremedhin (ETH) 3:45.90
  - Men's long jump: (gold) Mauro Vinícius da Silva (BRA) 8.23 (silver) Henry Frayne (AUS) 8.23 (bronze) Aleksandr Menkov (RUS) 8.22
  - Men's pole vault: (gold) Renaud Lavillenie (FRA) 5.95 **WL** (silver) Björn Otto (GER) 5.80 (bronze) Brad Walker (USA) 5.80
  - Men's heptathlon: (gold) Ashton Eaton (USA) 6645 **WR** (silver) Oleksiy Kasyanov (UKR) 6071 (bronze) Artem Lukyanenko (RUS) 5969
  - Women's 400 metres: (gold) Sanya Richards-Ross (USA) 50.79 (silver) Aleksandra Fedoriva (RUS) 51.76 (bronze) Natasha Hastings (USA) 51.82
  - Women's 1500 metres: (gold) Genzebe Dibaba (ETH) 4:05.78 (silver) Mariem Alaoui Selsouli (MAR) 4:07.78 (bronze) Aslı Çakır Alptekin (TUR) 4:08.74
  - Women's 60 metres hurdles: (gold) Sally Pearson (AUS) 7.73 **WL** (silver) Tiffany Porter (GBR) 7.94 (bronze) Alina Talay (BLR) 7.97
  - Women's triple jump: (gold) Yamilé Aldama (GBR) 14.82 (silver) Olga Rypakova (KAZ) 14.63 (bronze) Mabel Gay (CUB) 14.29
  - Women's high jump: (gold) Chaunté Lowe (USA) 1.98 (silver) Antonietta Di Martino (ITA), Anna Chicherova (RUS), Ebba Jungmark (SWE) 1.95
  - Women's shot put: (gold) Valerie Adams (NZL) 20.54 **AR** (silver) Nadzeya Ostapchuk (BLR) 20.42 (bronze) Michelle Carter (USA) 19.58

==== Auto racing ====
- Nationwide Series:
  - Sam's Town 300 in Las Vegas, Nevada:

==== Biathlon ====
- World Championships in Ruhpolding, Germany:
  - Women's 4 x 6 km Relay: (gold) Germany (Tina Bachmann, Magdalena Neuner, Miriam Gössner, Andrea Henkel) 1:09:33.0 (1+10) (silver) France (Marie Laure Brunet, Sophie Boilley, Anais Bescond, Marie Dorin Habert) 1:10:01.5 (0+7) (bronze) Norway (Fanny Welle-Strand Horn, Elise Ringen, Synnøve Solemdal, Tora Berger) 1:10:12.5 (0+12)
    - Germany retain the world title, with the same team as the one that competed in 2011.
    - Bachmann and Gössner both win their second world title.
    - Neuner wins her second title of the championships and 12th title overall.
    - Henkel wins her eighth world title.

==== Cross-country skiing ====
- World Cup in Oslo, Norway:
  - 50 km Classic Mass Start men:

==== Field hockey ====
- Men's Olympic Qualifying Tournament in Dublin, Ireland, matchday 1:
  - Malaysia 5–1 Chile
  - Ireland 6–1 Russia
  - South Korea 8–2 Ukraine

==== Football (soccer) ====
- CAF Champions League Preliminary round:
  - First leg: AS Vita Club (Democratic Republic of the Congo) 5–0 (Burundi) Atlético Olympic
  - Second leg (first leg score in parentheses): **Liga Muçulmana** (Mozambique) 3–0 (2–0) (Zanzibar) Mafunzo. Liga Muçulmana win 5–0 on aggregate.
- CAF Confederation Cup Preliminary round, second leg (first leg score in parentheses): Gor Mahia (Kenya) 0–1 (0–3) (Mozambique) **Ferroviário de Maputo**. Ferroviário de Maputo win 4–0 on aggregate.

==== Freestyle skiing ====
- World Cup in Åre, Sweden:
  - Men's Dual Moguls:
  - Women's Dual Moguls:
- World Cup in Moscow, Russia:
  - Men's Aerials:
  - Women's Aerials:
- World Cup in Grindelwald, Switzerland:
  - Men's Ski Cross:
  - Women's Ski Cross:

==== Nordic combined ====
- World Cup in Oslo, Norway:
  - HS 134 / 10 km:

==== Rugby union ====
- Six Nations Championship Week 4:
  - Wales – Italy in Cardiff
  - Ireland – Scotland in Dublin

==== Short track speed skating ====
- World Championships in Shanghai, China:

==== Snowboarding ====
- World Cup in La Molina, Spain:
  - Men's giant slalom:
  - Women's giant slalom:

==== Speed skating ====
- World Cup 7 in Berlin, Germany:

==== Wrestling ====
- European Championships in Belgrade, Serbia:

=== March 9, 2012 (Friday) ===
==== Alpine skiing ====
- Women's World Cup in Åre, Sweden:
  - Giant slalom:

==== Athletics ====
- World Indoor Championships in Istanbul, Turkey:
  - Men's shot put: (gold) Ryan Whiting (USA) 22.00 (silver) David Storl (GER) 21.88 (bronze) Tomasz Majewski (POL) 21.72
  - Women's pentathlon: (gold) Nataliya Dobrynska (UKR) 5013 (silver) Jessica Ennis (GBR) 4965 (bronze) Austra Skujytė (LTU) 4802
    - Dobrynska wins her first indoor world title and sets a new world record.

==== Biathlon ====
- World Championships in Ruhpolding, Germany:
  - Men's 4 x 7.5 km Relay: (gold) Norway (Ole Einar Bjørndalen, Rune Brattsveen, Tarjei Bø, Emil Hegle Svendsen) 1:17:26.8 (1+7) (silver) France (Jean-Guillaume Béatrix, Simon Fourcade, Alexis Bœuf, Martin Fourcade) 1:17:56.5 (0+10) (bronze) Germany (Simon Schempp, Andreas Birnbacher, Michael Greis, Arnd Peiffer) 1:18:19.8 (0+10)
    - Norway win the world title for the third time in succession.
    - Bjørndalen wins his second title of the championships and 18th title overall.
    - Svendsen wins his second title of the championships and seventh title overall.
    - Bø wins his fourth world title.

==== Cricket ====
- ICC Intercontinental Cup One-Day in Sharjah, United Arab Emirates: Scotland 205/9 (50 overs); United Arab Emirates 209/8 (49.5 overs). **United Arab Emirates win by 2 wickets**.

==== Football (soccer) ====
- CONCACAF Under-20 Women's Championship in Panama City, Panama:
  - Semi-finals:
    - **United States** 4–0 Mexico
    - Panama 0–6 **Canada**
      - United States and Canada qualify for FIFA U-20 Women's World Cup.

==== Freestyle skiing ====
- World Cup in Åre, Sweden:
  - Men's Moguls:
  - Women's Moguls:

==== Nordic combined ====
- World Cup in Oslo, Norway:
  - HS 106 / 10 km:

==== Short track speed skating ====
- World Championships in Shanghai, China:

==== Ski jumping ====
- Women's World Cup in Oslo, Norway:
  - HS 106:

==== Speed skating ====
- World Cup 7 in Berlin, Germany:

==== Wrestling ====
- European Championships in Belgrade, Serbia:

=== March 8, 2012 (Thursday) ===
==== Cricket ====
- Commonwealth Bank Series:
  - 3rd Final in Adelaide: Australia 231 (49.3 overs); Sri Lanka 215 (48.5 overs). **Australia win by 16 runs, win series 2–1**.

==== Football (soccer) ====
- UEFA Europa League Round of 16, first leg:
  - Metalist Kharkiv (Ukraine) 0–1 (Greece) Olympiacos
  - Sporting CP (Portugal) 1–0 (England) Manchester City
  - Twente (Netherlands) 1–0 (Germany) Schalke 04
  - Atlético Madrid (Spain) 3–1 (Turkey) Beşiktaş
  - Standard Liège (Belgium) 2–2 (Germany) Hannover 96
  - Valencia (Spain) 4–2 (Netherlands) PSV Eindhoven
  - AZ (Netherlands) 2–0 (Italy) Udinese
  - Manchester United (England) 2–3 (Spain) Athletic Bilbao
- Copa Libertadores second stage:
  - Group 2: Flamengo (Brazil) 1–0 (Ecuador) Emelec
  - Group 3: Junior (Colombia) 0–1 (Bolivia) Bolívar
  - Group 8: Godoy Cruz (Argentina) 4–4 (Colombia) Atlético Nacional
- CONCACAF Champions League quarterfinals, first leg: Isidro Metapán (El Salvador) 2–1 (Mexico) UNAM

==== Ski jumping ====
- Men's World Cup in Trondheim, Norway:
  - HS 140: (1) Daiki Ito (JPN) (2) Richard Freitag (GER) (3) Simon Ammann (SWI)

==== Wrestling ====
- European Championships in Belgrade, Serbia:

=== March 7, 2012 (Wednesday) ===
==== Biathlon ====
- World Championships in Ruhpolding, Germany:
  - Women's 20 km Individual: (gold) Tora Berger (NOR) 42:30.0 (1+0+0+0) (silver) Marie-Laure Brunet (FRA) 43:26.4 (0+0+0+1) (bronze) Helena Ekholm (SWE) 43:41.4 (1+0+0+0)
    - Berger wins her second title of the championships and third overall.

==== Cricket ====
- ICC Intercontinental Cup One-Day in Sharjah, United Arab Emirates: Scotland 167 (48.5 overs); United Arab Emirates 171/6 (47.5 overs). **United Arab Emirates win by 4 wickets**.

==== Football (soccer) ====
- UEFA Champions League Round of 16 second leg (first leg scores in parentheses):
  - **APOEL** (Cyprus) 1–0 (a.e.t.) (0–1) (France) Lyon. 1–1 on aggregate; APOEL win 4–3 on penalties.
  - **Barcelona** (Spain) 7–1 (3–1) (Germany) Bayer Leverkusen. Barcelona win 10–2 on aggregate.
    - Lionel Messi becomes the first player to score five goals in a match, in the Champions League era.
- Copa Libertadores second stage:
  - Group 1: Santos (Brazil) 3–1 (Brazil) Internacional
  - Group 4: Boca Juniors (Argentina) 1–2 (Brazil) Fluminense
  - Group 6: Corinthians (Brazil) 2–0 (Paraguay) Nacional
  - Group 7: Deportivo Quito (Ecuador) 3–0 (Argentina) Vélez Sársfield
- AFC Champions League group stage, matchday 1:
  - Group A: Nasaf Qarshi (Uzbekistan) 2–4 (United Arab Emirates) Al-Jazira
  - Group C:
    - Sepahan (Iran) 1–0 (United Arab Emirates) Al-Nasr
    - Lekhwiya (Qatar) 1–0 (Saudi Arabia) Al-Ahli
  - Group D:
    - Al-Shabab (United Arab Emirates) 0–0 (Qatar) Al-Gharafa
    - Al-Hilal (Saudi Arabia) 1–1 (Iran) Persepolis
  - Group G:
    - Nagoya Grampus (Japan) 2–2 (South Korea) Seongnam Ilhwa Chunma
    - Tianjin Teda (China) 0–0 (Australia) Central Coast Mariners
  - Group H:
    - Jeonbuk Hyundai Motors (South Korea) 1–5 (China) Guangzhou Evergrande
    - Buriram United (Thailand) 3–2 (Japan) Kashiwa Reysol
- AFC Cup group stage, matchday 1:
  - Group C:
    - Al-Kuwait 1–5 (Saudi Arabia) Al-Ettifaq
    - Al-Ahed (Lebanon) 5–3 (Maldives) VB
  - Group D:
    - Neftchi Farg'ona (Uzbekistan) 2–1 (Jordan) Al-Wehdat
    - Al-Oruba (Oman) 1–0 (India) Salgaocar
  - Group E: Al-Shorta (Syria) 3–2 (Iraq) Al-Zawra'a
  - Group G:
    - Yangon United (Myanmar) 1–1 (Thailand) Chonburi
    - Home United (Singapore) 3–1 (Hong Kong) Citizen
  - Group H:
    - Arema (Indonesia) 1–1 (Myanmar) Ayeyawady United
    - Kelantan (Malaysia) 0–0 (Vietnam) Navibank Sài Gòn
- CONCACAF Champions League quarterfinals, first leg:
  - Toronto FC (Canada) 2–2 (United States) Los Angeles Galaxy
  - Seattle Sounders FC (United States) 2–1 (Mexico) Santos Laguna

=== March 6, 2012 (Tuesday) ===
==== Biathlon ====
- World Championships in Ruhpolding, Germany:
  - Men's 20 km Individual: (gold) Jakov Fak (SLO) 46:48.2 (0+0+0+1) (silver) Simon Fourcade (FRA) 46:55.2 (0+0+1+0) (bronze) Jaroslav Soukup (CZE) 47:00.5 (0+1+0+0)
    - Fak becomes the first Slovenian biathlete to win a world title.

==== Cricket ====
- Commonwealth Bank Series:
  - 2nd Final in Adelaide: Australia 271/6 (50 Overs); Sri Lanka 272/2 (44.2 overs). **Sri Lanka win by 8 wickets**.

==== Football (soccer) ====
- CONCACAF Under-20 Women's Championship in Panama City, Panama (teams in **bold** advance to the semifinals):
  - Group B:
    - Guatemala 5–2 Cuba
    - **Panama** 0–6 **United States**
      - Standings: United States 9 points, Panama 6, Guatemala 3, Cuba 0.
- UEFA Champions League Round of 16 second leg (first leg scores in parentheses):
  - Arsenal (England) 3–0 (0–4) (Italy) **Milan**. Milan win 4–3 on aggregate.
  - **Benfica** (Portugal) 2–0 (2–3) (Russia) Zenit St. Petersburg. Benfica win 4–3 on aggregate.
- Copa Libertadores second stage:
  - Group 3: Unión Española (Chile) 1–1 (Chile) Universidad Católica
  - Group 5: Vasco da Gama (Brazil) 3–2 (Peru) Alianza Lima
  - Group 8: Peñarol (Uruguay) 1–1 Universidad de Chile
- AFC Champions League group stage Matchday 1:
  - Group A: Al-Rayyan (Qatar) 0–1 (Iran) Esteghlal
  - Group B:
    - Bani Yas (United Arab Emirates) 2–0 (Qatar) Al-Arabi
    - Al-Ittihad (Saudi Arabia) 4–0 (Uzbekistan) Pakhtakor
  - Group E:
    - Gamba Osaka (Japan) 0–3 (South Korea) Pohang Steelers
    - Bunyodkor (Uzbekistan) 1–2 (Australia) Adelaide United
  - Group F:
    - Brisbane Roar (Australia) 0–2 (Japan) FC Tokyo
    - Ulsan Hyundai (South Korea) 2–1 (China) Beijing Guoan
- AFC Cup group stage Matchday 1:
  - Group A:
    - Al-Qadsia (Kuwait) 2–0 (Oman) Al-Suwaiq
    - Al-Faisaly (Jordan) 1–1 (Syria) Al-Ittihad
  - Group B:
    - East Bengal (India) 0–1 (Yemen) Al-Oruba
    - Arbil (Iraq) 1–1 (Kuwait) Kazma
  - Group E: Al-Tilal (Yemen) 1–2 (Lebanon) Safa
  - Group F:
    - Sông Lam Nghệ An (Vietnam) 0–1 (Malaysia) Terengganu
    - Kitchee (Hong Kong) 3–1 (Singapore) Tampines Rovers
- CONCACAF Champions League quarterfinals, first leg: Morelia (Mexico) 1–3 (Mexico) Monterrey
- CAF Champions League preliminary round, second leg (first leg score in parentheses): Diables Noirs (Republic of the Congo) 0–1 (0–1) (Ivory Coast) **AFAD Djékanou**. AFAD Djékanou wins 2–0 on aggregate.

=== March 5, 2012 (Monday) ===
==== Football (soccer) ====
- CONCACAF Under-20 Women's Championship in Panama City, Panama (teams in **bold** advance to the semifinals):
  - Group A:
    - Haiti 0–0 Jamaica
    - **Canada** 1–0 **Mexico**
      - Standings: Canada 9 points, Mexico 6, Jamaica, Haiti 1.

=== March 4, 2012 (Sunday) ===
==== Biathlon ====
- World Championships in Ruhpolding, Germany:
  - Men's 12.5 km Pursuit: (gold) Martin Fourcade (FRA) 33:39.4 (1+1+0+2) (silver) Carl Johan Bergman (SWE) 33:44.6 (0+1+1+0) (bronze) Anton Shipulin (RUS) 34:01.5 (1+0+0+0)
    - Fourcade retains his pursuit title, and wins his second title of the championships.
  - Women's 10 km Pursuit: (gold) Darya Domracheva (BLR) 29:39.6 (0+1+1+0) (silver) Magdalena Neuner (GER) 30:04.7 (0+1+0+2) (bronze) Olga Vilukhina (RUS) 30:55.0 (0+0+1+0)
    - Domracheva wins her first world title.

==== Cricket ====
- Commonwealth Bank Series:
  - 1st Final in Brisbane: Australia 321/6 (50 Overs); Sri Lanka 306 (49.2 Overs). **Australia win by 15 runs**.

==== Football (soccer) ====
- CONCACAF Under-20 Women's Championship in Panama City, Panama:
  - Group B:
    - Cuba 0–6 United States
    - Panama 3–1 Guatemala
- CAF Champions League preliminary round, second leg (first leg scores in parentheses):
  - Les Astres (Cameroon) 2–1 (0–1) (Central African Republic) **DFC8**. 2–2 on aggregate; DFC8 win on away goals.
  - **Africa Sports** (Ivory Coast) 2–0 (2–3) (Gabon) Missile. Africa Sports win 4–3 on aggregate.
  - **Horoya AC** (Guinea) 1–0 (0–0) (Sierra Leone) Ports Authority. Horoya AC win 1–0 on aggregate.
  - **APR** (Rwanda) 1–0 (0–0) (Kenya) Tusker. APR win 1–0 on aggregate.
  - **Ethiopian Coffee** (Ethiopia) 4–1 (0–1) (Comoros) Coin Nord. Ethiopian Coffee win 4–2 on aggregate.
  - **Tonnerre** (Benin) 1–0 (0–0) (Niger) ASGNN. Tonnerre win 1–0 on aggregate.
  - Lesotho Correctional Services 0–0 (0–3) (Uganda) **URA**. URA win 3–0 on aggregate.
  - **Dolphins** (Nigeria) 3–0 (3–0) (Equatorial Guinea) CD Elá Nguema. Dolphins win 6–0 on aggregate.
  - **Berekum Chelsea** (Ghana) 3–0 (2–0) (Liberia) LISCR. Berekum Chelsea win 5–0 on aggregate.
  - **Power Dynamos** (Zambia) 3–0 (5–1) (Madagascar) Japan Actuel's. Power Dynamos win 8–1 on aggregate.
- CAF Confederation Cup preliminary round, second leg (first leg scores in parentheses):
  - Motor Action (Zimbabwe) 0–2 (1–1) (South Africa) **Black Leopards**. Black Leopards win 3–1 on aggregate.
  - **Simba** (Tanzania) 2–1 (1–1) (Rwanda) Kiyovu Sports. Simba win 3–2 on aggregate.
  - AS Tempête Mocaf (Central African Republic) 2–2 (0–2) (Republic of the Congo) **AC Léopard**. AC Léopard win 4–2 on aggregate.
  - Sahel SC (Niger) 2–2 (0–2) (Chad) **Renaissance FC**. Renaissance FC win 4–2 on aggregate.
  - Casa Sport (Senegal) 1–0 (a.e.t.) (0–1) (The Gambia) **GAMTEL**. 1–1 on aggregate; GAMTEL win 4–3 on penalties.
  - **TANA** (Madagascar) 2–0 (1–2) (Botswana) Extension Gunners. TANA win 3–2 on aggregate.
  - **Hwange** (Zimbabwe) 4–1 (3–0) (Zanzibar) Jamhuri. Hwange win 7–1 on aggregate.

=== March 3, 2012 (Saturday) ===
==== Biathlon ====
- World Championships in Ruhpolding, Germany:
  - Men's 10 km Sprint: (gold) Martin Fourcade (FRA) 24:18.6 (1+1) (silver) Emil Hegle Svendsen (NOR) 24:33.7 (1+1) (bronze) Carl Johan Bergman (SWE) 24:36.3 (0+0)
    - Fourcade wins his first world sprint title and second title overall.
  - Women's 7.5 km Sprint (all 0+0): (gold) Magdalena Neuner (GER) 21:07.0 (silver) Darya Domracheva (BLR) 21:22.2 (bronze) Vita Semerenko (UKR) 21:44.6
    - Neuner wins her third world sprint title and eleventh title overall.

==== Football (soccer) ====
- CONCACAF Under-20 Women's Championship in Panama City, Panama:
  - Group A:
    - Mexico 10–0 Haiti
    - Jamaica 0–2 Canada
- CAF Champions League preliminary round, second leg (first leg scores in parentheses):
  - **Zamalek** (Egypt) 1–0 (1–1) (Tanzania) Young Africans. Zamalek win 2–1 on aggregate.
  - **Recreativo do Libolo** (Angola) 1–1 (3–1) (South Africa) Orlando Pirates. Recreativo do Libolo win 4–2 on aggregate.
  - US Ouakam (Senegal) 0–1 (a.e.t.) (1–0) (The Gambia) **Brikama United**. 1–1 on aggregate; Brikama United win 3–1 on penalties.
  - **FC Platinum** (Zimbabwe) 4–0 (4–2) (Eswatini) Green Mamba. FC Platinum win 8–2 on aggregate.
- CAF Confederation Cup preliminary round, second leg (first leg scores in parentheses):
  - **Étoile Filante** (Burkina Faso) 2–0 (0–1) (Benin) Dragons. Étoine Filante win 2–1 on aggregate.
  - **FC Kallon** (Sierra Leone) 2–0 (0–1) (Cameroon) Union Douala. FC Kallon win 2–1 on aggregate.
  - **Royal Leopards** (Eswatini) 1–0 (0–0) (Zambia) Red Arrows. Royal Leopards win 1–0 on aggregate.
  - **Saint-George SA** (Ethiopia) 4–0 (1–0) (Gabon) AS Mangasport. Saint-George SA win 5–0 on aggregate.
  - **Unisport Bafang** (Cameroon) 0–0 (1–0) (Ivory Coast) Séwé Sports. Unisport Bafang win 1–0 on aggregate.
  - Atlético Semu (Equatorial Guinea) 0–2 (0–3) (Burundi) **LLB Académic**. LLB Académic win 5–0 on aggregate.

==== Mixed martial arts ====
- UFC on FX: Alves vs. Kampmann in Sydney, Australia:
  - Middleweight bout: **Costas Philippou** (CYP) def. Court McGee (USA) via unanimous decision (29–28, 29–28, 29–28)
  - Flyweight bout: Demetrious Johnson (USA) and Ian McCall (USA) fought to a majority draw (29–28, 29–29, 28–28)
  - Flyweight bout: **Joseph Benavidez** (USA) def. Yasuhiro Urushitani (JPN) via TKO (punches)
  - Welterweight bout: **Martin Kampmann** (DEN) def. Thiago Alves (BRA) via submission (guillotine choke)
- Strikeforce: Tate vs. Rousey in Columbus, Ohio, United States (USA unless stated):
  - Middleweight bout: **Ronaldo Souza** (BRA) def. Bristol Marunde via submission (arm-triangle choke)
  - Middleweight bout: **Lumumba Sayers** def. Scott Smith via submission (guillotine choke)
  - Welterweight bout: **Kazuo Misaki** (JPN) def. Paul Daley (ENG) via split decision (30–27, 28–29, 29–28)
  - Lightweight bout: **Josh Thomson** def. K. J. Noons via unanimous decision (29–28, 29–28, 29–28)
  - Women's Bantamweight Championship bout: **Ronda Rousey** def. Miesha Tate (c) via submission (armbar)

=== March 2, 2012 (Friday) ===
==== Equestrianism ====
- Show jumping – Nations Cup Promotional League:
  - Nations Cup of the United States in Wellington, Florida: (gold) Germany (Jörg Oppermann, David Will, Johannes Ehning, Meredith Michaels-Beerbaum) (silver) Ireland (Shane Sweetnam, Richie Moloney, Darragh Kerins, Cian O'Connor) (bronze) Canada (Ian Millar, Tiffany Foster, Yann Candele, Eric Lamaze)

==== Football (soccer) ====
- CONCACAF Under-20 Women's Championship in Panama City, Panama:
  - Group B:
    - United States 6–0 Guatemala
    - Panama 2–1 Cuba
- CAF Champions League preliminary round, second leg (first leg scores in parentheses):
  - **ASO Chlef** (Algeria) 4–1 (0–0) (Burkina Faso) ASFA Yennenga. ASO Chlef win 4–1 on aggregate.
  - **JSM Béjaïa** (Algeria) 3–1 (0–0) (Chad) Foullah Edifice. JSM Béjaïa win 3–1 on aggregate.

=== March 1, 2012 (Thursday) ===
==== Basketball ====
- Euroleague Top 16 matchday 6 (teams **in bold** advance to the quarterfinals):
  - Group E:
    - Anadolu Efes (Turkey) 65–82 (Russia) **CSKA Moscow**
    - **Olympiacos** (Greece) 88–81 (Turkey) Galatasaray Medical Park
      - Standings: CSKA Moscow 5–1, Olympiacos, Galatasaray Medical Park 3–3, Anadolu Efes 1–5.
  - Group F:
    - Unicaja (Spain) 55–59 (Spain) **Gescrap Bizkaia**
    - **Montepaschi Siena** (Italy) 90–102 (Spain) Real Madrid
      - Standings: Montepaschi Siena, Gescrap Bizkaia, Real Madrid 4–2, Unicaja 0–6.

==== Biathlon ====
- World Championships in Ruhpolding, Germany:
  - 2 x 6 km + 2 x 7.5 km Mixed Relay: (gold) Norway (Tora Berger, Synnøve Solemdal, Ole Einar Bjørndalen, Emil Hegle Svendsen) 1:12:29.3 (1+11) (silver) Slovenia (Andreja Mali, Teja Gregorin, Klemen Bauer, Jakov Fak) 1:12:49.5 (0+7) (bronze) Germany (Andrea Henkel, Magdalena Neuner, Andreas Birnbacher, Arnd Peiffer) 1:13:02.1 (1+10)

==== Football (soccer) ====
- CONCACAF Under-20 Women's Championship in Panama City, Panama:
  - Group A:
    - Canada 5–0 Haiti
    - Mexico 3–1 Jamaica
