= Vernon Philander =

South African cricketer (born 1985)

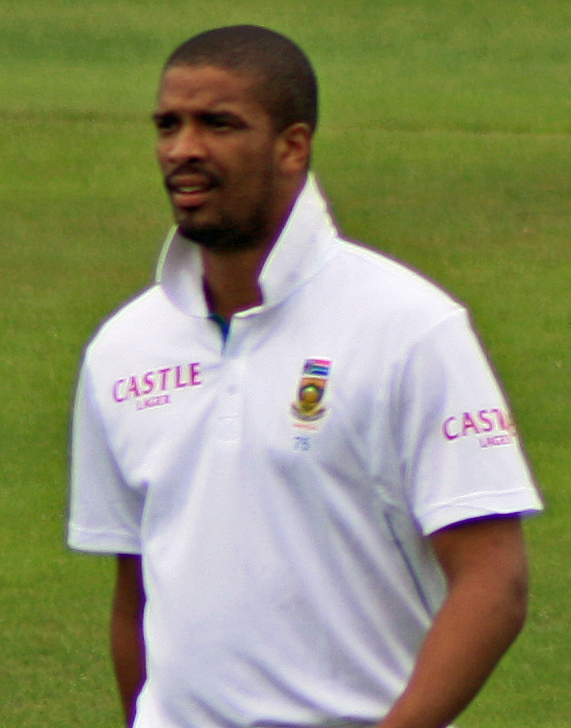
- Philander in 2012

Personal information
- Full name: Vernon Darryl Philander
- Born: 24 June 1985 (age 41); Bellville, Cape Province, South Africa
- Nickname: The Surgeon, VDP, Vern, Pro, V-Dawg
- Height: 175 cm (5 ft 9 in)
- Batting: Right-handed
- Bowling: Right-arm fast-medium
- Role: All-rounder

International information
- National side: South Africa (2007–2020)
- Test debut (cap 311): 9 November 2011 v Australia
- Last Test: 24 January 2020 v England
- ODI debut (cap 86): 24 June 2007 v Ireland
- Last ODI: 23 August 2015 v New Zealand
- ODI shirt no.: 24
- T20I debut (cap 29): 11 September 2007 v West Indies
- Last T20I: 16 December 2007 v West Indies
- T20I shirt no.: 24

Domestic team information
- Years: Team
- 2003/04–2015/16: Western Province
- 2004: Devon
- 2005/06–2018/19: Cape Cobras
- 2008: Middlesex
- 2012: Somerset
- 2013: Kent
- 2013: Jamaica Tallawahs
- 2015: Nottinghamshire
- 2015/16: South Western Districts
- 2017: Sussex
- 2018: Durban Heat
- 2019: Cape Town Blitz

Career statistics
Competition	Test	ODI	FC	LA
Matches	64	30	168	129
Runs scored	1,779	151	4,941	1,418
Batting average	24.04	12.58	26.14	23.63
100s/50s	0/8	0/0	3/17	0/5
Top score	74	30*	168	79*
Balls bowled	11,391	1,279	29,108	5,419
Wickets	224	41	580	129
Bowling average	22.32	24.04	21.82	32.61
5 wickets in innings	13	0	24	0
10 wickets in match	2	0	2	0
Best bowling	6/21	4/12	7/61	4/12
Catches/stumpings	17/–	6/–	41/–	12/–
- Source: ESPNcricinfo, 28 January 2020

Vernon Darryl Philander (born 24 June 1985) is a South African cricket coach, commentator, and former cricketer. He was a right-handed bowling all-rounder; he had previously represented his country at under 19 level. He played for the South Africa national cricket team and Cape Cobras in South African domestic cricket. In December 2019, ahead of a Test series against England, Philander announced that the series would be his last before retiring from international cricket.

== Domestic career ==
Philander was chosen for the emerging players tournament in Australia, and took 3 for 30, as well as hitting 59 off 50 balls in the final against New Zealand A. South Africa would go on to win the tournament.

Philander has played English county cricket, firstly for Middlesex in April & May 2008, Somerset in April & May 2012, and Kent in July 2013.

In October 2018, Philander was named in Durban Heat's squad for the first edition of the Mzansi Super League T20 tournament. In September 2019, he was named in the squad for the Cape Town Blitz team for the 2019 Mzansi Super League tournament. In April 2021, he was named in Western Province's squad, ahead of the 2021–22 cricket season in South Africa.

== International career ==
=== International debut ===
Philander made his ODI debut on his 22nd birthday, against Ireland at Belfast. He took 4 for 12, which went on to be a match-winning performance.

Philander enjoyed a tremendous start to his international career. On 9 November 2011, Philander made his Test debut against Australia, and was awarded Man of the Match after taking 5–15 in Australia's second innings, in which Australia was dismissed for 47, that country's lowest completed test innings total since 1902. He was also Man of the Series, with 14 wickets at 13.92 and two five-wicket hauls across the two tests.

The following month, Philander took five wickets in each innings in the first test of South Africa's home series against Sri Lanka. He became the fifth player in history to take five wickets in an innings in each of his first three tests. These performances led to him being awarded a national contract by Cricket South Africa in January 2012.

=== Through ranks ===
In the series in New Zealand which began in March 2012, Philander picked up five wickets in the first test at Dunedin, which ended a draw. He followed this up with a match-winning performance in the second test at Hamilton where he picked up 4–70 and 6–44 for the second 10-wicket haul of his career.

In the third test at Wellington, Philander excelled once again, picking up 6–81 in the first innings. During the course of this innings, he bowled New Zealand batsman Doug Bracewell for his 50th test wicket in only his 7th match, and thus became the second-fastest bowler ever to claim 50 wickets. The only bowler to get to the mark faster was Charles Turner who achieved the feat in 1888. He went wicketless in the second innings as New Zealand held on for a draw.

In October 2012, alongside Dale Steyn and Morné Morkel, Philander was part of a South African pace attack bowling coach and former test cricketer Allan Donald called the best the country had ever produced.

In 2013, Philander was one of the South African bowlers who bowled out New Zealand for 45, the lowest Test match total of the millennium.

On 20 December 2013, Philander took his 100th test wicket in the first test against India in Johannesburg. He needed only 19 matches to reach his 100 wickets, the joint-sixth-fastest ever. Earlier the same day he scored an anchor-innings of 59 runs (from 86 balls), batting at number 8, showing off his versatility for the Proteas. These efforts led him to achieve the number 1 ranking in ICC Test Bowling Rankings for the year 2013.

On 12 November 2016, Philander took his tenth five-wicket haul in Tests, during the second Test against Australia. Australia was bowled out for 85 runs, which was their lowest in a home Test in 32 years. This was also third time by Philander, in which the opposition has been dismissed for fewer than 100 and Philander has taken a five-for.

=== Retirement ===
In December 2019, Philander announced that the Test series against England would be his last international series before his retirement. He retired from international cricket after the series ended.

=== Coaching career ===
In September 2021, Philander was added to the Pakistan team's coaching staff for the T20 World Cup in the UAE.

== See also ==
- List of South Africa cricketers who have taken five-wicket hauls on Test debut
