= 2011–12 Commonwealth Bank Series =

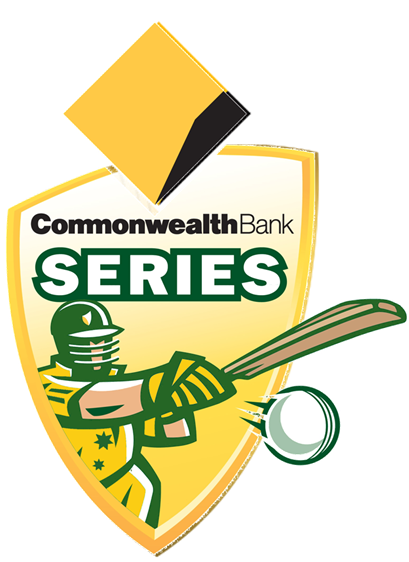
- Date: 5 February 2012 – 8 March 2012
- Location: Australia
- Result: Australia (beat Sri Lanka 2–1 in the finals)
- Player of the series: Tillakaratne Dilshan (SL)
Teams
Australia	India	Sri Lanka
Captains
Michael Clarke	M. S. Dhoni	Mahela Jayawardene
Most runs
David Warner (458)	Virat Kohli (373)	Tillakaratne Dilshan (505)
Most wickets
Daniel Christian (13)	Vinay Kumar (9)	Lasith Malinga (18)

The 2011–12 edition of the Commonwealth Bank Series was a One Day International cricket tournament which was held in Australia. It was a tri-nation series between Australia, India, and Sri Lanka. This was the first time Australia had hosted a tri-series since 2007–08.

== Squads ==
Australia	India	Sri Lanka
Michael Clarke (c); Ricky Ponting; Matthew Wade (wk); David Warner; Peter Forrest; Daniel Christian; David Hussey; Michael Hussey; Brett Lee; Ryan Harris; Mitchell Starc; Xavier Doherty; Mitchell Marsh; Clint McKay; Ben Hilfenhaus; Jon Holland; George Bailey; Shane Watson	M. S. Dhoni (c & wk); Parthiv Patel (wk); Gautam Gambhir; Praveen Kumar; Irfan Pathan; Virender Sehwag; Rohit Sharma; Manoj Tiwary; Umesh Yadav; Ravichandran Ashwin; Ravindra Jadeja; Virat Kohli; Suresh Raina; Rahul Sharma; Sachin Tendulkar; Vinay Kumar; Zaheer Khan	Mahela Jayawardene (c); Kumar Sangakkara (wk); Dinesh Chandimal (wk); Rangana Herath; Farveez Maharoof; Thisara Perera; Upul Tharanga; Chanaka Welegedara; Tillakaratne Dilshan; Nuwan Kulasekara; Lasith Malinga; Dhammika Prasad; Sachithra Senanayake; Lahiru Thirimanne; Thilan Samaraweera; Angelo Mathews; Chamara Kapugedera

== Decision Review System ==
The series was played without the players having access to the Umpire Decision Review System (DRS). At the time, the DRS could be used in any series at the agreement of all participating cricket boards, but the Board of Control for Cricket in India opposed its use in this series. Umpires could still initiate reviews to the third umpire for run out, stumping and no ball decisions.

== Points table ==
Group Stage
Pos	Team	Pld	W	L	T	NR	BP	Pts	NRR	For	Against
1	Sri Lanka	8	4	3	1	0	1	19	0.164	1977/373.3	1920/374.2
2	Australia	8	4	4	0	0	3	19	−4.639	16/373	1663/355.1
3	India	8	3	4	1	0	1	15	−0.593	1793/365	2103/382

Source: Commonwealth Bank Series 2011/12 Table

Points System:

In the event of teams finishing on equal points, the right to play in the final match or series was determined as follows:

- The team with the highest number of wins
- If still equal, the team with the highest number of wins over the other team(s) who are equal on points and have the same number of wins
- If still equal, the team with the highest number of bonus points
- If still equal, the team with the highest net run rate

In a match declared as no result, run rate is not applicable.

Won (W): 4
Lost (L): 0
No Result (NR): 2
Tie (T): 2
Bonus Points (BP): 1 (The team that achieves a run rate of 1.25 times that of the opposition shall be awarded one bonus point. A team's run rate will be calculated by reference to the runs scored in an innings divided by the number of overs faced)

- Net run rate (NRR): Runs per over scored less runs per over conceded, adjusting team batting first to overs of team batting second in rain rule matches, adjusting to team's full allocation if all out, and ignoring no result matches.

== Group stage matches ==
=== 1st match ===
5 February
14:20 (D/N)
Scorecard

Australia; 5/216 (32 overs)	v	India; 151 (29.4 overs)
Matthew Wade 67 (69); Vinay Kumar 3/21 (7 overs)		Virat Kohli 31 (34); Clint McKay 4/20 (4.4 overs)

Australia won by 65 runs (D/L)
Melbourne Cricket Ground, Melbourne
Attendance: 29,959
Umpires: Nigel Llong (Eng) and Bruce Oxenford (Aus)
Player of the match: Matthew Wade (Aus)

- India won the toss and elected to field.
- Rain interrupted the match 11 overs into Australia's innings, with the innings reduced to 32 overs.
- Australia earned a bonus point.
- ODI debuts: Matthew Wade and Daniel Christian (both Aus)

India won the toss and elected to field in windy conditions, and with rain forecast to interrupt the Australian innings. The rain came after 11 overs, with Australia struggling at 35–2, with Vinay Kumar dismissing both Warner (6) and Ponting (2) for single figures, and keeping the run rate tight. The rain delay reduced the match to 32 overs per side. Following the rain, Australia accelerated, and added 181 runs in 21 overs, Matthew Wade (67) making a half-century on debut, and Michael and David Hussey (45 off 32 balls and 61 off 30 balls respectively) contributing with aggressive middle order batting, to take the total to 5/216. After applying the Duckworth-Lewis method, there was no change to the target, with India to chase 217 to win.

India lost Tendulkar (2) and Gambhir (5) inside the first four overs, with Mitchell Starc (2/33) taking both wickets. Virat Kohli (31) and Rohit Sharma (21) added 51 for the third wicket, before Clint McKay (4/20) dismissed both in the 12th over, reducing India to 4/65. Wickets fell regularly, and India could not keep up with the required run rate. Eventually, India was dismissed for 151 in the 30th over. Australia won by 65 runs and claimed a bonus point; Matthew Wade was man of the match.

=== 2nd match ===
8 February
12:20 (D/N)
Scorecard

Sri Lanka; 8/233 (50 overs)	v	India; 6/234 (46.4 overs)
Dinesh Chandimal 64 (81); Ravichandran Ashwin 3/32 (10 overs)		Virat Kohli 77 (94); Angelo Mathews 2/31 (9.4 overs)

India won by 4 wickets
WACA Ground, Perth
Attendance: 6,685
Umpires: Nigel Llong (Eng) and Paul Reiffel (Aus)
Player of the match: Ravichandran Ashwin (Ind)

- Sri Lanka won the toss and elected to bat first

Sri Lanka won the toss and chose to bat. After reaching a comfortable position at 2/100 in the 24th over, the Indian bowlers were able to stifle the Sri Lankan run rate through the middle portion of the innings with tight bowling and regular wickets. Sri Lanka passed 200 in the 46th over, and finished at 8/233. Ravichandran Ashwin (3/32 from 10 overs) was the best of the bowlers, and Dinesh Chandimal (64) top-scored for Sri Lanka.

India had the run rate well under control in its innings, and had reached 3/157 after 32 overs, before a middle order collapse saw them fall to 6/181 after 36 overs, giving Sri Lanka a chance at bowling India out. However, the number seven and eight batsmen, Ravindra Jadeja (24*) and Ravichandran Ashwin (30*), put on an unbeaten 53 run partnership to guide India to victory in the 47th over.

=== 3rd match ===
10 February
12:20 (D/N)
Scorecard

Australia; 231 (49.1 overs)	v	Sri Lanka; 226 (49.5 overs)
Michael Clarke 57 (88); Angelo Mathews 2/37 (9 overs)		Angelo Mathews 64 (76); Xavier Doherty 2/24 (10 overs)

Australia won by 5 runs
WACA Ground, Perth
Attendance: 13,085
Umpires: Nigel Llong (Eng) and Bruce Oxenford (Aus)
Player of the match: Michael Clarke (Aus)

- Sri Lanka won the toss and elected to field.

Sri Lanka won the toss and sent Australia in, and dismissed the Australian top order cheaply, reducing them to 3/50 in the 9th over. Michael Clarke (57) tried to anchor the Australian innings, but wickets continued to fall around him; when Clarke fell in the 41st over, the score was 7/190, and Australia was at risk of not batting out its overs. A 32-run partnership for the ninth wicket between Clint McKay (25) and Mitchell Starc (14) helped Australia to reach the 50th over, and they were ultimately bowled out for 231 with five balls remaining. The wickets were shared, with no bowler taking more than two.

In its chase, Sri Lanka had the run rate under control for most of the innings, but lost wickets regularly. They fell to 3/88 in the 21st over, then to 6/130 in the 31st over. Batting at number seven, Angelo Mathews (64) anchored the batting in the lower order, sharing good partnerships with the tail – including 32 runs for the eighth wicket with Sachithra Senanayake and 46 runs for the tenth wicket with Dhammika Prasad – to get Sri Lanka into the 50th over, but the run rate suffered. In the end, Sri Lanka needed 18 from the last over; Mathews hit a four and a six from the first two deliveries, but was caught in the deep on the penultimate ball, with Sri Lanka five runs short of Australia's total. As in the Australian innings, the wickets were shared, with no bowler taking more than two wickets; Xavier Doherty's 2/24 from ten overs were the most economical figures.

=== 4th match ===
12 February
13:50 (D/N)
Scorecard

Australia; 8/269 (50 overs)	v	India; 6/270 (49.4 overs)
David Hussey 72 (76); Umesh Yadav 2/49 (10 overs)		Gautam Gambhir 92 (111); Clint McKay 3/53 (9.4 overs)

India won by 4 wickets
Adelaide Oval, Adelaide
Attendance: 22,728
Umpires: Nigel Llong (Eng) and Paul Reiffel (Aus)
Player of the match: Gautam Gambhir (Ind)

- Australia won the toss and elected to bat first.
- ODI debut: Peter Forrest (Aus)

Australia won the toss and chose to bat, and lost both openers inside the first ten overs. Michael Clarke (38), David Hussey (72) and debutant Peter Forrest (66) batted comfortably through the middle of the innings to take Australia to 4/212 after 40 overs; however, Indian fast bowlers Zaheer Khan and Vinay Kumar prevented Australia from accelerating through the final ten overs, and Australia finished at 8/269.

India batted its way into a very comfortable position at the start of its run chase, reaching 2/166 in the 32nd over to be in a strong position to win. They lost Rohit Sharma (33) and Gautam Gambhir (92) in quick succession, and the run rate slowed – India added only eighteen runs in the batting powerplay, which was taken shortly after the wickets. After careful batting by MS Dhoni (44*) and Suresh Raina (38), India brought itself back to a winning position, requiring 40 runs from the last five overs, with six wickets in hand. Eventually, India needed 13 runs from the final over, which Dhoni scored with two balls to spare.

=== 5th match ===
14 February
13:50 (D/N)
Scorecard

Sri Lanka; 9/236 (50 overs)	v	India; 9/236 (50 overs)
Dinesh Chandimal 81 (91); Vinay Kumar 3/46 (10 overs)		Gautam Gambhir 91 (106); Thisara Perera 2/45 (9 overs)

Match tied
Adelaide Oval, Adelaide
Umpires: Simon Fry (Aus) and Nigel Llong (Eng)
Player of the match: Mahendra Singh Dhoni (Ind)

- Sri Lanka won the toss and elected to bat first.

Batting first, Sri Lanka lost Upul Tharanga (0) in the first over, and was in a vulnerable position at 3/79 in the 20th over. Dinesh Chandimal (81) and Mahela Jayawardene (43) added 94 runs for the fourth wicket to bring Sri Lanka to 3/173 in the 36th over, but both were dismissed shortly afterwards, which stifled the Sri Lankan innings. Only 58 more runs were added in the 12.3 overs after Chandimal's dismissal, to take Sri Lanka to a total of 9/236.

In its chase, Gautam Gambhir (91) scored his second consecutive score of in the nineties to anchor the innings, while nobody else in the top order was able to manage more than twenty runs. Gambhir was joined at the crease by MS Dhoni (58*) in the 28th over, and the pair added sixty runs before Gambhir was run out in the 41st over, with the score 5/178. Dhoni batted patiently with the lower order, and batted into a position where it needed 24 runs to win from the last two overs with three wickets in hand: Angelo Mathews conceded 15 runs from the 49th over, including a wide and a no ball, and Lasith Malinga conceded 8 runs from the last over, including three from the final ball, to tie the game.

There was mild controversy when it was later discovered that India's 30th over had been called off after only five deliveries.

=== 6th match ===
17 February
14:20 (D/N)
Scorecard

Australia; 158 (40.5 overs)	v	Sri Lanka; 2/152 (24.1 overs)
David Hussey 58 (64); Farveez Maharoof 2/18 (8 overs)		Mahela Jayawardene 61* (67); Clint McKay 1/23 (6 overs)

Sri Lanka won by 8 wickets (D/L)
Sydney Cricket Ground, Sydney
Attendance: 22,365
Umpires: Billy Bowden (NZ) and Simon Fry (Aus)
Player of the match: Thisara Perera (SL)

- Australia won the toss and elected to bat first.
- Rain interrupted the match 26 overs into Australia's innings, with the innings reduced to 41 overs.
- Sri Lanka was set a revised target of 152 runs to win from 41 overs according to Duckworth-Lewis method.
- Sri Lanka earned a bonus point.

After winning the toss and choosing to bat, Australia's top and middle orders were decimated by Sri Lanka's bowling. When rain interrupted play after 26 overs, Australia was struggling at 6/88. After the resumption, with the innings shortened to 41 overs, Australia managed to extend its score to 158, mostly through the batting of David Hussey (58), who was the only Australian batsman to pass a score of twenty runs, and his 49-run partnership with Mitchell Starc (17) for the ninth wicket. Thisara Perera (2/29 from 7 overs) and Farveez Maharoof (2/18 from 8 overs) finished with the best bowling figures for Sri Lanka. The target was adjusted down to 152 by the Duckworth-Lewis method.

Sri Lanka had no difficulty chasing down Australia's total, winning in the 25th over, at a run rate of 6.28, to claim the bonus point. Mahela Jayawardene (61*) top-scored in the run chase.

=== 7th match ===
19 February
13:20 (D/N)
Scorecard

Australia; 5/288 (50 overs)	v	India; 178 (43.3 overs)
Michael Hussey 59 (52); Irfan Pathan 3/61 (10 overs)		M. S. Dhoni 56 (84); Ben Hilfenhaus 5/33 (9.3 overs)

Australia won by 110 runs
The Gabba, Brisbane
Attendance: 32,063
Umpires: Billy Bowden (NZ) and Steve Davis (Eng)
Player of the match: Ben Hilfenhaus (Aus)

- Australia won the toss and elected to bat.
- Australia earned a bonus point.
- Australia was led by Ricky Ponting in absence of regular captain Michael Clarke.
- Ricky Ponting was dropped from the Australian side after this match as a result he announced his retirement from ODI cricket.

In a solid performance by the entire batting line-up, Australia reached 5/288 in its innings. Four of the top five batsmen – Matthew Wade (45), David Warner (43), Peter Forrest (52) and Michael Hussey (59) – passed forty runs to set a strong platform, and middle order batsmen Daniel Christian (30* from 18 balls) and David Hussey (26* from 20 balls) accelerated through the death overs. Irfan Pathan (3/61) was the best of the Indian bowlers.

In reply, India's top order fell cheaply, with Brett Lee and Ben Hilfenhaus each taking two wickets to reduce India to 4/36 in the 11th over. India never recovered from that start, and only MS Dhoni (56) could provide any significant resistance, as India was dismissed in the 44th over for 178, conceding a bonus point. Hilfenhaus finished with 5/33 to win Man of the Match, and Brett Lee also took one more wicket to finish 3/49.

Indian captain MS Dhoni was charged for India's slow over rate, which saw the Australian innings run half an hour longer than scheduled, and he was suspended for India's next ODI. It was Dhoni's second suspension for a slow over rate during the summer, after missing the fourth Test against Australia in January.

Australian Ricky Ponting was dropped after this match, after failing to reach double figures during the series.

=== 8th match ===
21 February
13:20 (D/N)
Scorecard

Sri Lanka; 6/289 (50 overs)	v	India; 238 (45.1 overs)
Lahiru Thirimanne 62 (62); Ravichandran Ashwin 2/50 (10 overs)		Virat Kohli 66 (83); Thisara Perera 4/37 (7.1 overs)

Sri Lanka won by 51 runs
The Gabba, Brisbane
Umpires: Billy Bowden (NZ) and Paul Reiffel (Aus)
Player of the match: Nuwan Kulasekara (SL)

- Sri Lanka won the toss and elected to bat.
- Team India was led by Virender Sehwag since MS Dhoni was banned for one match for slow over-rate.

As Australia had done in the seventh ODI, almost Sri Lanka's entire batting line-up played well in the first innings – Mahela Jayawardene (45), Tillekaratne Dilshan (51), Dinesh Chandimal (38) and Lahiru Thirimanne (62) set a strong platform, and Angelo Mathews (49* from 37 balls) and Thisara Perera (10 from 7 balls) accelerated at the death. Sri Lanka finished with 6/289.

Sri Lanka took three early wickets, including two to Nuwan Kulasekara, to reduce India to 3/54. Suresh Raina (32) and Virat Kohli (66) added 92 for the fourth wicket, to bring India to 3/146 in the 31st over, before Raina was dismissed. Sri Lanka regained its winning position when Kulasekara (3/40) dismissed Ravindra Jadeja (17), India's last recognised batsman, in the 38th over with the score 6/191. Irfan Pathan (47 from 34 balls) gave India some hope, but he quickly ran out of batting partners, and India was dismissed for 238 in the 46th over. Sri Lanka won by 51 runs, seven runs shy of the margin required to earn a bonus point.

Sri Lankan top-scorer Lahiru Thirimanne had to survive a mankading when he was on 44. He was mankaded by Ravichandran Ashwin in the 40th over, after having previously been warned by the bowler for leaving his crease early, but Indian stand-in captain Virender Sehwag on the advice of Sachin Tendulkar decided to withdraw the appeal.

=== 9th match ===
24 February
14:20 (D/N)
Scorecard

Australia; 6/280 (50 overs)	v	Sri Lanka; 7/283 (49.2 overs)
Peter Forrest 104 (138); Angelo Mathews 2/43 (7 overs)		Mahela Jayawardene 85 (81); Daniel Christian 3/53 (8 overs)

Sri Lanka won by 3 wickets
Bellerive Oval, Hobart
Umpires: Billy Bowden (NZ) and Bruce Oxenford (Aus)
Player of the match: Mahela Jayawardene (SL)

- Australia won the toss and elected to bat

Australia lost both openers cheaply to be reduced to 2/27 in the 7th over, before Peter Forrest (104) and Michael Clarke (72) batted together for more than thirty overs, and added 154 runs for the third wicket. Forrest reached his maiden international century, and the first century by a batsman in the tri-series, in the 40th over. From the strong platform of 3/197, aggressive batting in the death overs by David Hussey (40 from 28 balls), Michael Hussey (21 from 14 balls) and Brett Lee (20 from 15 balls) allowed Australia to post a strong total of 6/280.

In reply, Mahela Jayawardene opened the batting aggressively, bring his personal total to fifty in only the 12th over. Jayawardene (85) and Dinesh Chandimal (80) took the score to 2/153 in the 27th over, when Jayawardene was dismissed. Chandimal added another ninety runs in partnerships to bring Sri Lanka to 4/243. At this point, Sri Lanka was in a comfortable position, needing 38 from 35 deliveries. Ryan Harris and Ben Hilfenhaus each took a wicket to reduce Sri Lanka to 6/250 after 46 overs; but aggressive hitting from Thisara Perera (21 from 11 balls), including twelve runs off Daniel Christian in the 49th over saw Sri Lanka home with four balls to spare.

=== 10th match ===
26 February
14:20 (D/N)
Scorecard

Australia; 9/252 (50 overs)	v	India; 165 (39.3 overs)
David Warner 68 (66); Virender Sehwag 3/43 (9 overs)		Ravichandran Ashwin 26 (37); Shane Watson 2/9 (5 overs)

Australia won by 87 runs
Sydney Cricket Ground, Sydney
Umpires: Simon Taufel (Aus) and Billy Bowden (NZ)
Player of the match: David Warner (Aus)

- Australia won the toss and elected to bat
- Australia earned a bonus point.

Australia was reduced to 2/26 after two early wickets to Praveen Kumar (2/37). Australia recovered to reach 3/107, before David Warner (68 off 66 balls) was dismissed in the 21st over. David Hussey (54) and Matthew Wade (56) added 94 runs for the fifth wicket, taking Australia to 4/201, before both men were dismissed by Umesh Yadav (2/39) in the space of four overs. Australia was unable to accelerate through the death overs, mostly through the part-time bowling of Virender Sehwag, who took 3/43 from his nine overs; Australia passed 250 only by scoring 13 runs from Sehwag's last over.

In its run chase, India lost wickets early and regularly, before being dismissed for 165 in the 40th over. There were no innings or partnerships of note: Ravichandran Ashwin top-scored with 26, and the highest partnership was only 44 runs, between Gautam Gambhir (23) and Virat Kohli (21). Xavier Doherty, Shane Watson and Ben Hilfenhaus all took two wickets for Australia. Australia won the match with a bonus point, and the result ensured that Australia qualified for the finals.

David Hussey had to survive an appeal for either handled the ball or obstructing the field when he was on 17 in the 24th over. While taking a single, Hussey used his open hand to swat away a throw which was on target for the stumps, but was also likely to hit Hussey as he attempted to make his ground. The third umpire, after much deliberation, gave him not out. It was the second unusual appeal of the series, after the attempted mankading of Lahiru Thirimanne in the eighth ODI. In another controversial incident, Sachin Tendulkar while running was obstructed by Brett Lee and was forced to go around him, eventually getting run out by a direct hit from David Warner.

=== 11th match ===
28 February
14:20 (D/N)
Scorecard

Sri Lanka; 4/320 (50 overs)	v	India; 3/321 (36.4 overs)
Tillakaratne Dilshan 160* (165); Ravindra Jadeja 1/43 (9 overs)		Virat Kohli 133* (86); Farveez Maharoof 1/21 (3 Overs)

India won by 7 wickets
Bellerive Oval, Hobart
Umpires: Simon Taufel (Aus) and Asad Rauf (Pak)
Player of the match: Virat Kohli (Ind)

- India won the toss and decided to field.
- India earned a bonus point

Entering India's final round robin match, it was five points behind Sri Lanka. As such, India needed to beat Sri Lanka with a bonus point to have a chance at reaching the finals; any other result would have ended India's tournament.

Sri Lanka was sent in to bat, and compiled a huge total of 4/320. Most of the runs came in a 200-run partnership for the second wicket between Tillekaratne Dilshan and Kumar Sangakkara, both of whom made centuries. Sangakkara (105 from 87 balls) was finally dismissed in the 44th over. Dilshan finished the innings unbeaten on 160 from 165 balls; his last 60 runs came from only 33 deliveries in the death overs.

Needing to score at more than eight runs per over to earn the bonus point, the openers started quickly: Virender Sehwag (30 from 16 balls) and Sachin Tendulkar (39 from 30 balls) helped to take the score to 2/86 in the tenth over. Tendulkar's dismissal brought Virat Kohli to the crease, who batted in two century partnerships to complete the run chase in only 36.4 overs, earning the bonus point. Kohli and Gautam Gambhir (63 from 64 balls) put on 115 for the third wicket, then Kohli and Suresh Raina (40 from 24 balls) put on an unbeaten 120 runs for the fourth wicket. Kohli finished unbeaten on 133 runs from 86 balls; he completed his century in 76 balls, then added his last 33 runs in only ten deliveries, including hitting 24 runs off Lasith Malinga in the 35th over. Malinga conceded 96 runs from his 7.4 overs, setting a new record for the worst innings economy rate in ODI history (12.52).

=== 12th match ===
2 March
14:20 (D/N)
Scorecard

Sri Lanka; 238 (50 overs)	v	Australia; 229 (49.1 Overs)
Dinesh Chandimal 75 (84); Daniel Christian 5/31 (9 overs)		David Hussey 74 (74); Lasith Malinga 4/49 (10 overs)

Sri Lanka won by 9 runs
Melbourne Cricket Ground, Melbourne
Umpires: Asad Rauf (Pak) and Rod Tucker (Aus)
Player of the match: Dinesh Chandimal (SL)

- Sri Lanka won the toss and elected to bat.
- Daniel Christian (Aus) took the 31st ODI hat-trick.

Entering the match, Australia had already qualified for the finals. Sri Lanka and India were tied on 15 points for second, with India ahead on the head-to-head tiebreaker; as such, Sri Lanka needed at least one point to qualify for the finals. A win, tie, or no result would see Sri Lanka qualify, a loss would see India qualify.

Sri Lanka fell to 2/17 in the fifth over, before Kumar Sangakkara (64), Dinesh Chandimal (75) and Lahiru Thirimanne (51) all scored half centuries to steady Sri Lanka's innings. Sri Lanka brought the score to 4/195 in the 42nd over, with Thirimanne still at the crease, before collapsing to 8/206 in the 44th over; this was due to the efforts of Daniel Christian, who dismissed Thisara Perera, Sachithra Senanayake and Nuwan Kulasekara for a hat-trick (the 31st hat-trick in ODI history), and took 4/5 across a two over spell. Thirimanne and Rangana Herath (14) added 29 for the ninth wicket to help to take the Sri Lankan total to 238. Christian finished with 5/31 from nine overs, and James Pattinson, playing his first ODI for the summer, took four top order wickets to finish with 4/51.

Australia's reply started poorly, with Lasith Malinga taking two early wickets to help reduce Australia to 3/26 in the 5th over. Shane Watson (65) and Michael Hussey (29) added 87 for the fourth wicket to resurrect the Australian innings. Sri Lanka's bowling attack was struck by injuries to both Angelo Mathews and Thisara Perera, which forced Thirimanne to bowl for only the third time in his List A career, but Thirimanne got the breakthrough, dismissing Michael Hussey in the 25th over. When Shane Watson was dismissed by Malinga (4/49) in the 31st over, Australia fell to 5/140, putting Sri Lanka in a winning position. David Hussey (74) almost guided Australia to victory, but he quickly ran out of batting partners; a 39-run partnership with Xavier Doherty (7) for the ninth wicket was the longest partnership of Hussey's innings. Needing ten runs from the last over with one wicket in hand, Hussey was caught in the deep from the first delivery.

The victory sent Sri Lanka to the top of the points table, qualifying Sri Lanka for the finals series.

== Finals ==
=== 1st final ===
4 March
13:20 (D/N)
Scorecard

Australia; 6/321 (50 overs)	v	Sri Lanka; 306 (49.2 overs)
David Warner 163 (157); Dhammika Prasad 2/51 (7 overs)		Nuwan Kulasekara 73 (43); David Hussey 4/43 (8 overs)

Australia won by 15 runs
The Gabba, Brisbane
Umpires: Asad Rauf (Pak) and Paul Reiffel (Aus)
Player of the match: David Warner (Aus)

- Australia won the toss and elected to bat.
- Rain interrupted play at 10.2 and 28 overs of the Australian innings, but it did not affect the number of overs.
- David Warner (Aus) scored his first century in ODIs and his score of 163 is the highest individual score at the Gabba, Brisbane.

Winning the toss and choosing to bat, Australian batsmen made their first century opening stand for the series, with David Warner and Matthew Wade (64) taking the score to 0/136 in the 24th over before Wade was dismissed. Warner batted throughout the rest of the innings, bringing up his maiden ODI century in the 35th over from 113 balls, and finally being dismissed on the last ball of the innings for 163 from 157 balls. Support came from Michael Clarke (37 from 25 balls) and Michael Hussey (19* from 10 balls), to take the total to 6/321.

In reply, Sri Lanka replied with a strong run rate, but Brett Lee took the wickets of the two openers to leave Sri Lanka at 2/66 after eight overs. The run rate slowed and wickets fell regularly, and when Farveez Maharoof was dismissed in the first ball of the 31st over, Sri Lanka were reduced to 6/144; Kumar Sangakkara (42) was the only batsman to have passed twenty runs, and Brett Lee (3/59) and part-time spinner David Hussey (4/43) had each taken three wickets. Two significant and fast-scoring lower order partnerships then brought Sri Lanka back into contention for the game: Upul Tharanga (60) and Nuwan Kulasekara (73 from 43 balls) added 104 runs from 69 deliveries for the seventh wicket, and Tharanga and Dhammika Prasad (31* from 21 balls) added 37 runs from 25 balls for the eighth wicket.

Sri Lanka needed 23 runs from the final three overs with two wickets in hand, but accurate death bowling by Lee and Shane Watson saw both wickets fall for only seven runs, with four deliveries to spare. The final margin of victory was 15 runs, and Australia took a 1–0 lead in the finals series.

Australia's innings match was interrupted twice by rain, and light rain fell for much of the game, but no overs were lost.

=== 2nd final ===
6 March
13:50 (D/N)
Scorecard

Australia; 6/271 (50 Overs)	v	Sri Lanka; 2/272 (44.2 overs)
Michael Clarke 117 (91); Lasith Malinga 3/40 (10 Overs)		Tillakaratne Dilshan 106 (119); Brett Lee 1/41 (8 overs)

Sri Lanka won by 8 wickets
Adelaide Oval, Adelaide
Umpires: Asad Rauf (Pak) and Bruce Oxenford (Aus)
Player of the match: Tillakaratne Dilshan (SL)

- Australia won the toss and elected to bat.

After choosing to bat, Australia were reduced to 2/56 in the 16th over, at a conservative run rate of 3.69. After that, Michael Clarke (117) and David Warner (100) batted together for more than thirty overs, adding 184 runs for the third wicket, and Warner scoring a century for the second consecutive match. From the strong platform of 2/232 after 43 overs, Australia failed to accelerate at the death, scoring only 39 runs from the last seven overs to set a total of 6/271; Lasith Malinga (3/40) took 3/13 from his last three overs of the innings. Sri Lanka dropped five catching opportunities in the field.

It took Sri Lanka only six overs to reach 0/50 in reply – helped by a poor display of opening bowling by Australia, which conceded twelve extras and a catch behind annulled through wides, no balls and byes. Mahela Jayawardene (80) and Tillekaratne Dilshan (106) put together an opening stand of 179 runs before Jayawardene was dismissed in the 28th over. Kumar Sangakkara (51*) also contributed a half century, and Sri Lanka cruised to a comfortable victory in the 45th over, to level the finals series 1–1.

=== 3rd final ===
8 March
13:50 (D/N)
Scorecard

Australia; 231 (49.3 overs)	v	Sri Lanka; 215 (48.5 overs)
Matthew Wade 49 (74); Rangana Herath 3/36 (10 ovrs)		Upul Tharanga 71 (122); Clint McKay 5/28 (9.5 overs)

Australia won by 16 runs
Adelaide Oval, Adelaide
Umpires: Asad Rauf (Pak) and Bruce Oxenford (Aus)
Player of the match: Clint McKay (Aus)

- Sri Lanka won the toss and elected to field.
- ODI debut: Nathan Lyon

After being sent in, Australian openers David Warner (48) and Matthew Wade (49) set a strong opening platform of 1/115 in the 21st over. The top order then collapsed, Sri Lanka taking 4/20 in seven overs to reduce Australia to 5/135. The middle order failed to recover, and Australia was reduced to 7/177 in the 38th over, before a 40 run partnership between bowlers Clint McKay (28) and Brett Lee (32) helped to take the Australian score to 231, all out in the 50th over. The bowling of Rangana Herath (3/36 from 10 overs) and Farveez Maharoof (3/40 from 10 overs) was key to Sri Lanka's recovery during the Australian innings.

In its reply, Sri Lanka fell to 4/53 inside ten overs as Lee and McKay took two early wickets each. Upul Tharanga (71) helped to resurrect the Sri Lankan innings, compiling a fifth wicket partnership of 60 runs with Lahiru Thirimanne (30) to bring the score to 4/113, but after Tharanga's dismissal, wickets fell regularly until Sri Lanka was reduced to 8/204 in the 46th over. Australia eventually dismissed Sri Lanka in the 49th over for 215, largely through the bowling of Clint McKay, who took 5/28 for the innings. Australia won the series 2–1.
