= 2011–12 Euroleague Quarterfinals =

Basketball tournament

Results for the Quarterfinals of the 2011–12 Euroleague basketball tournament.

The quarterfinals were played from March 22 to April 6, 2012. Team #1 (i.e., the group winner in each series) hosts Games 1 and 2, plus Game 5 if necessary. Team #2 hosts Game 3, plus Game 4 if necessary.

Team 1	Agg.	Team 2	1st leg	2nd leg	3rd leg	4th leg	5th leg
CSKA Moscow (Russia)	3–1	(Spain) Gescrap Bizkaia	98–71	79–60	81–94	73–71	
Montepaschi Siena (Italy)	1–3	(Greece) Olympiacos	75–82	81–80	55–75	69–76	
Panathinaikos (Greece)	3–2	(Israel) Maccabi Tel Aviv	93–73	92–94	62–65	78–69	86–85
FC Barcelona (Spain)	3–0	(Russia) UNICS	78–66	66–63	67–56		

All times are CET (UTC+1).

== Quarterfinal 1 ==
=== Game 1 ===
21 March 2012
17:15

Report

CSKA Moscow (Russia)	98–71	(Spain) Gescrap Bizkaia
Scoring by quarter: 27–26, 23–14, 34–11, 14–20
Pts: Krstić 18; Rebs: Kirilenko 5 Asts: Teodosić 5		Pts: Vasileiadis 15; Rebs: Hervelle 5 Asts: Jackson 6

CSKA Universal Sports Hall, Moscow
Attendance: 4,625
Referees: Ilija Belosevic (SRB), Srdan Dozai (CRO), Panagiotis Anastopoulos (GRE)

=== Game 2 ===
23 March 2012
17:15

Report

CSKA Moscow (Russia)	79–60	(Spain) Gescrap Bizkaia
Scoring by quarter: 26–15, 15–21, 17–16, 21–8
Pts: Kirilenko 20; Rebs: Kirilenko 12; Asts: Teodosić 9		Pts: López 13; Rebs: Fischer 6 Asts: Mumbrú 10

CSKA Universal Sports Hall, Moscow
Attendance: 4,900
Referees: Dubravko Muhvic (CRO), Eddie Viator (FRA), Tasos Piloidis (GRE)

=== Game 3 ===
28 March 2012
19:00

Report

Gescrap Bizkaia (Spain)	94–81	(Russia) CSKA Moscow
Scoring by quarter: 25-24, 22-16, 24-17, 23-24
Pts: Vasileiadis 20; Rebs: Vasileiadis 6 Asts: Jackson 8		Pts: Krstić 22; Rebs: Kirilenko 6 Asts: Gordon 5

Bilbao Arena, Bilbao
Attendance: 10,014
Referees: Guerrino Cerebuch (ITA), Fernando Rocha (POR), Elias Kormilas (GRE)

=== Game 4 ===
30 March 2012
20:30

Report

Gescrap Bizkaia (Spain)	71–73	(Russia) CSKA Moscow
Scoring by quarter: 15–21, 13–18, 19–17, 27–17
Pts: Jackson 19; Rebs: Fischer, Mumbrú 6 Asts: Jackson 8		Pts: Kirilenko 23; Rebs: Kirilenko 8 Asts: Teodosić 8

Bilbao Arena, Bilbao
Attendance: 10,014
Referees: Sasa Pukl (SLO), Jakub Zamojski (POL), Damir Javor (SLO)

== Quarterfinal 2 ==
=== Game 1 ===
21 March 2012
20:45

Report

Montepaschi Siena (Italy)	75–82	(Greece) Olympiacos
Scoring by quarter: 26–21, 22–21, 18–16, 9–24
Pts: Andersen 28; Rebs: Andersen 7 Asts: McCalebb 4		Pts: Printezis 20; Rebs: Dorsey 8 Asts: Law 5

Palasport Mens Sana, Siena
Attendance: 4,768
Referees: Jose Martín (ESP), Antonio Conde (ESP), Olegs Latisevs (LAT)

=== Game 2 ===
23 March 2012
20:45

Report

Montepaschi Siena (Italy)	81–80	(Greece) Olympiacos
Scoring by quarter: 22–18, 26–17, 19–18, 14–27
Pts: McCalebb 21; Rebs: Andersen, Lavrinovič 6 Asts: Zisis, Rakočević 4		Pts: Printezis 15; Rebs: Dorsey, Printezis 6 Asts: Law 5

Palasport Mens Sana, Siena
Attendance: 5,061
Referees: Juan Carlos Arteaga (ESP), Sreten Radovic (CRO), Matej Boltauzer (SLO)

=== Game 3 ===
28 March 2012
20:00

Report

Olympiacos (Greece)	75–55	(Italy) Montepaschi Siena
Scoring by quarter: 14-12, 18-9, 16-9, 27-25
Pts: Hines 15; Rebs: Hines 9 Asts: Spanoulis, Law 6		Pts: McCalebb 15; Rebs: Andersen 5 Asts: Three players 2

Peace and Friendship Stadium, Piraeus
Attendance: 12,000
Referees: Grezegorz Ziemblicki (POL), Robert Lottermoser (GER), Emilio Perez Pizarro (ESP)

=== Game 4 ===
30 March 2012
20:45

Report

Olympiacos (Greece)	76–69	(Italy) Montepaschi Siena
Scoring by quarter: 21-21, 17-18, 16-16, 22-14
Pts: Hines, Spanoulis 19; Rebs: Printezis 9 Asts: 4 players 2		Pts: Zisis, Andersen 15; Rebs: Andersen 11; Asts: Lavrinovič 2

Peace and Friendship Stadium, Piraeus
Attendance: 12,000
Referees: Juan Carlos Arteaga (ESP), Vicente Bulto (ESP), Eddie Viator (FRA)

== Quarterfinal 3 ==
=== Game 1 ===
20 March 2012
21:00

Report

Panathinaikos (Greece)	93–73	(Israel) Maccabi Tel Aviv
Scoring by quarter: 28–18, 27–16, 24–18, 14–21
Pts: Diamantidis 15; Rebs: Calathes 8 Asts: Diamantidis 8		Pts: Langford 21; Rebs: Smith 6 Asts: Pnini 3

Olympic Indoor Hall, Athens
Attendance: 18,000
Referees: Sasa Pukl (SLO), Vicente Bulto (ESP), Robert Lottermoser (GER)

=== Game 2 ===
22 March 2012
20:00

Report

Panathinaikos (Greece)	92–94 (OT)	(Israel) Maccabi Tel Aviv
Scoring by quarter: 24-20, 19-21, 15-20, 25-22, Overtime: 9-11
Pts: Kaimakoglou 20; Rebs: Batiste 9 Asts: Diamantidis, Batiste 6		Pts: Langford 17; Rebs: Smith 9 Asts: Ohayon 5

Olympic Indoor Hall, Athens
Attendance: 18,000
Referees: Grzegorz Ziemblicki (POL), Daniel Hierrezuelo (ESP), Emilio Perez Pizarro(esp)

=== Game 3 ===
27 March 2012
20:45

Report

Maccabi Tel Aviv (Israel)	65–62	(Greece) Panathinaikos
Scoring by quarter: 24–13, 17–15, 9–16, 15–18
Pts: Ohayon 12; Rebs: Smith 9 Asts: Ohayon 6		Pts: Batiste 13; Rebs: Three players 6 Asts: Diamantidis 5

Yad Eliyahu Arena, Tel Aviv
Attendance: 10,728
Referees: Luigi Lamonica (ITA), Jose Martín (ESP), Recep Ankarali (TUR)

=== Game 4 ===
29 March 2012
21:05

Report

Maccabi Tel Aviv (Israel)	69–78	(Greece) Panathinaikos
Scoring by quarter: 19-17, 17-24, 14-13, 19-24
Pts: Smith, Langford 14; Rebs: Ohayon 9 Asts: Eliyahu, Langford 2		Pts: Calathes 15; Rebs: Smith, Kaimakoglou 7 Asts: Calathes, Jasikevičius 3

Yad Eliyahu Arena, Tel Aviv
Attendance: 10,728
Referees: Carl Jungerand (FIN), Borys Ryzgyk (UKR), Juan Carlos Garcia Gonzalez (ESP)

=== Game 5 ===
5 April 2012
20:45

Report

Panathinaikos (Greece)	86–85	(Israel) Maccabi Tel Aviv
Scoring by quarter: 18-20, 23-12, 21-21, 24-32
Pts: Diamantidis 25; Rebs: Diamantidis 6 Asts: Diamantidis, Jasikevičius 3		Pts: Blu 14; Rebs: Smith 9 Asts: Langford 5

Olympic Indoor Hall, Athens
Attendance: 18,000
Referees: Guerrino Cerebuch (ITA), Sreten Radovic (CRO), Tplga Sahin (ITA)

== Quarterfinal 4 ==
=== Game 1 ===
20 March 2012
19:00

Report

FC Barcelona Regal (Spain)	78–66	(Russia) UNICS
Scoring by quarter: 22–14, 23–19, 17–20, 16–13
Pts: Mickeal 22; Rebs: Mickeal 7 Asts: Huertas 10		Pts: Jawai 15; Rebs: Veremeenko 9 Asts: Samoylenko 4

Palau Blaugrana, Barcelona
Attendance: 5,863
Referees: Carl Jungebrand (FIN), Spiros Gkontas (GRE), Robert Vyklicky (CZE)

=== Game 2 ===
22 March 2012
20:45

Report

FC Barcelona Regal (Spain)	66–63	(Russia) UNICS
Scoring by quarter: 17–13, 16–17, 18–18, 15–15
Pts: Navarro 18; Rebs: Huertas, Mickeal 4 Asts: Huertas 5		Pts: Jawai 21; Rebs: Jawai 10; Asts: Veremeenko, Domercant 3

Palau Blaugrana, Barcelona
Attendance: 5,073
Referees: Luigi Lamonica (ITA), Boris Ryzhyk (UKR), Milija Vojinovic (SRB)

=== Game 3 ===
27 March 2012
18:00

Report

UNICS (Russia)	56–67	(Spain) FC Barcelona Regal
Scoring by quarter: 19–17, 15–11, 11–18, 11–21
Pts: Domercant 19; Rebs: McCarty 8 Asts: Greer 3		Pts: Navarro 21; Rebs: Vázquez 6 Asts: Huertas 4

Basket Hall Arena, Kazan
Attendance: 5,000
Referees: Christos Christodoulou (GRE), Milivoje Jovcic (SRB), Tolga Sahin (ITA)
