= South African cricket team in New Zealand in 2011–12 =

International cricket tour

South African cricket team in New Zealand in 2012
	New Zealand	South Africa
- Dates: 17 February 2012 – 27 March 2012
Captains	Ross Taylor (Tests), Brendon McCullum (ODI and T20)	Graeme Smith (Tests), AB de Villiers (ODI and T20)

Test series
- Result: South Africa won the 3-match series 1–0
Most runs	Graeme Smith (282)	Kane Williamson (229)
Most wickets	Vernon Philander (21)	Mark Gillespie (11)

One Day International series
- Results: South Africa won the 3-match series 3–0
Most runs	Brendon McCullum (188)	Hashim Amla (176)
Most wickets	Kyle Mills & Rob Nicol (3)	Morné Morkel (7)

Twenty20 International series
- Results: South Africa won the 3-match series 2–1
Most runs	Martin Guptill (151)	Richard Levi (141)
Most wickets	Tim Southee (5)	Morné Morkel (4)

The South African cricket team toured New Zealand from 17 February to 27 March 2012. The tour consisted of three Twenty20 (T20), three One Day Internationals (ODIs) and three Tests.

== Squads ==
Tests		ODIs		T20Is	
New Zealand	South Africa	New Zealand	South Africa	New Zealand	South Africa
Ross Taylor (c); Brent Arnel; Trent Boult; Doug Bracewell; Andrew Ellis; Martin Guptill; Chris Martin; Brendon McCullum (wk); Rob Nicol; Tim Southee; Daniel Vettori; BJ Watling; Kane Williamson; Mark Gillespie	Graeme Smith (c); AB de Villiers (vc); Hashim Amla; Mark Boucher (wk); Marchant de Lange; Jean-Paul Duminy; Imran Tahir; Jacques Kallis; Morné Morkel; Alviro Petersen; Robin Peterson; Vernon Philander; Jacques Rudolph; Dale Steyn; Lonwabo Tsotsobe	Brendon McCullum (c) & (wk); Michael Bates; Doug Bracewell; Andrew Ellis; James Franklin; Martin Guptill; Tom Latham; Nathan McCullum; Andy McKay; Kyle Mills; Tarun Nethula; Rob Nicol; Jesse Ryder; Tim Southee; Kane Williamson	Hashim Amla; Johan Botha; Jean-Paul Duminy; Faf du Plessis; Jacques Kallis; Albie Morkel; Morné Morkel; Justin Ontong; Wayne Parnell; Robin Peterson; Graeme Smith; Dale Steyn; Lonwabo Tsotsobe	Brendon McCullum (c) & (wk); Michael Bates; Doug Bracewell; Colin de Grandhomme; Andrew Ellis; James Franklin; Martin Guptill; Ronnie Hira; Nathan McCullum; Kyle Mills; Rob Nicol; Jacob Oram; Tim Southee; Kane Williamson; Jesse Ryder	AB de Villiers (c) & (wk); Hashim Amla; Johan Botha; Marchant de Lange; Jean-Paul Duminy; Colin Ingram; Richard Levi; Albie Morkel; Morné Morkel; Justin Ontong; Wayne Parnell; Robin Peterson; Rusty Theron; Lonwabo Tsotsobe

== Warm-up Game ==
=== T20 ===
15 February
Scorecard

South Africa; 150/6 (20 overs)	v	Canterbury Wizards; 130 (19 overs)
Richard Levi 63 (32); George Worker 3/23 (4 overs)		Matt Henry 42 (17); Jean-Paul Duminy 1/20 (2 overs)

South Africa won by 20 runs
Hagley Oval, Christchurch
Umpires: Derek Walker and Tim Parlane
Player of the match: Martin Guptill

- Canterbury Wizards won the toss and elected to field

== Twenty20 Series ==
=== 1st T20I ===
17 February
Scorecard

South Africa; 147/6 (20 overs)	v	New Zealand; 148/4 (19.2 overs)
Jean-Paul Duminy 41 (37); Tim Southee 3/28 (4 overs)		Martin Guptill 78 (55); Jean-Paul Duminy 1/20 (2 overs)

New Zealand won by 6 wickets
Westpac Stadium, Wellington
Umpires: Gary Baxter and Barry Frost
Player of the match: Martin Guptill

- New Zealand won the toss and chose to field

=== 2nd T20I ===
19 February
Scorecard

New Zealand; 173/4 (20 overs)	v	South Africa; 174/2 (16 overs)
Martin Guptill 47 (35); Johan Botha 1/22 (4 overs)		Richard Levi 117* (51); Rob Nicol 1/10 (1 over)

South Africa won by 8 wickets
Seddon Park, Hamilton
Umpires: Gary Baxter Chris Gaffaney (both NZL)
Player of the match: Richard Levi (South Africa)

- South Africa won the toss and elected to field.
- T20I debut: Marchant de Lange (South Africa)

=== 3rd T20I ===
22 February
Scorecard

South Africa; 165/7 (20 overs)	v	New Zealand; 162/7 (20 overs)
Jean-Paul Duminy 38 (20); Rob Nicol 2/20 (3 overs)		Jesse Ryder 52 (42); Johan Botha 2/20 (4 overs)

South Africa won by 3 runs
Eden Park, Auckland
Umpires: Gary Baxter and Chris Gaffaney (both NZL)
Player of the match: Johan Botha (South Africa)

- New Zealand won the toss and elected to field.

== ODI Series ==
=== 1st ODI ===
25 February
13:30 (D/N)
Scorecard

New Zealand; 253/9 (50 overs)	v	South Africa; 254/4 (45.2 overs)
Brendon McCullum 56 (67); Lonwabo Tsotsobe 2/41 (10 overs)		AB de Villiers 106 (106); Kyle Mills 1/27 (7 overs)

South Africa won by 6 wickets
Westpac Stadium, Wellington
Umpires: CB Gaffaney and RK Illingworth
Player of the match: AB de Villiers (South Africa)

- New Zealand won the toss and decided to bat.

=== 2nd ODI ===
29 February
Scorecard

New Zealand; 230 (47.3 overs)	v	South Africa; 231/4 (38.2 overs)
Brendon McCullum 85 (96); Morné Morkel 5/38 (9.3 overs)		Hashim Amla 92 (107); Tarun Nethula 2/60 (10 overs)

South Africa won by 6 wickets
McLean Park, Napier
Umpires: Aleem Dar and Gary Baxter
Player of the match: Morné Morkel

- South Africa won the toss and decided to field

=== 3rd ODI ===
3 March
Scorecard

New Zealand; 206 (47 overs)	v	South Africa; 208/5 (43.2 overs)
Brendon McCullum 47 (59); Marchant de Lange 4/46 (9 overs)		Hashim Amla 76 (89); Rob Nicol 2/14 (3.2 overs)

South Africa won by 5 wickets
Eden Park, Auckland
Umpires: Chris Gaffaney and Richard Illingworth
Player of the match: Marchant de Lange

- South Africa won the toss and decided to field
- ODI debut: Marchant de Lange (South Africa)

== Test series ==
=== 1st Test ===
7–11 March
Scorecard

South Africa	v	New Zealand
238 (68.2 overs); Hashim Amla 62 (102); Chris Martin 4/56 (18 overs)		273 (88.2 overs); Brendon McCullum 48 (102); Vernon Philander 4/72 (18 overs)
435/5 (dec) (140 overs); Graeme Smith 115 (234); Doug Bracewell 3/70 (25 overs)		137/2 (41 overs); Brendon McCullum 58 (91); Vernon Philander 1/29 (12 overs)

Match drawn
University Oval, Dunedin
Umpires: Aleem Dar and Billy Doctrove
Player of the match: Graeme Smith (South Africa)

- New Zealand won the toss and decided to field
- Day 1 was shortened to 59 overs due to morning rain. Day 5 was abandoned due to rain.

=== 2nd Test ===
15–19 March
Scorecard

New Zealand	v	South Africa
185 (61.2 overs); Brendon McCullum 61 (133); Vernon Philander 4/70 (15 overs)		253 (77.3 overs); AB de Villiers 83 (133); Mark Gillespie 5/59 (15 overs)
168 (67.5 overs); Kane Williamson 77 (193); Vernon Philander 6/44 (15.5 overs)		103/1 (19.5 overs); Graeme Smith 55* (60); Doug Bracewell 1/14 (5 overs)

South Africa won by 9 wickets
Seddon Park, Hamilton
Umpires: Billy Doctrove and Richard Kettleborough
Player of the match: Vernon Philander (South Africa)

- South Africa won the toss and decided to field

=== 3rd Test ===
23–27 March
Scorecard

South Africa	v	New Zealand
474/9 (dec) (148.4 overs); Alviro Petersen 156 (335); Mark Gillespie 6/113 (33.4 overs)		275 (96 overs); Martin Guptill 59 (156); Vernon Philander 6/81 (22 overs)
189/3 (dec) (29.4 overs); AB de Villiers 68 (49); Daniel Vettori 1/40 (7 overs)		200/6 (80.4 overs); Kane Williamson 102 (228)*; Morné Morkel 6/23 (16.4 overs)

Match drawn
Basin Reserve, Wellington
Umpires: Aleem Dar and Richard Kettleborough
Player of the match: Morné Morkel (South Africa)

- New Zealand won the toss and elected to field.
