= Magdalena Neuner =

German biathlete (born 1987)

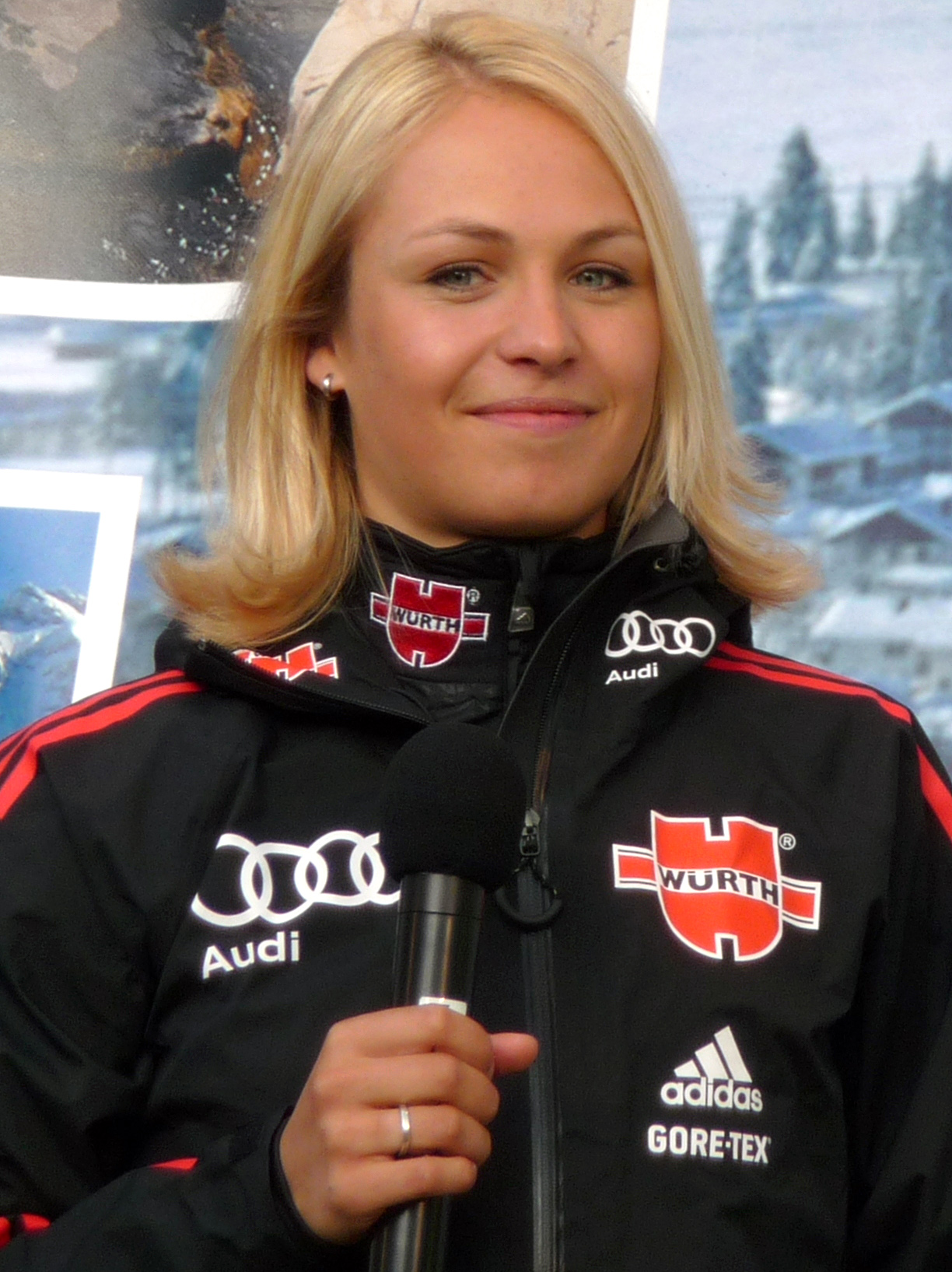
- Neuner in 2011

Personal information
- Born: 9 February 1987 (age 39) Garmisch-Partenkirchen, West Germany
- Height: 5 ft 5 in (165 cm)
- Website: www.magdalena-neuner.de

Sport

Professional information
- Sport: Biathlon
- Club: SC Wallgau
- World Cup debut: 13 January 2006
- Retired: 18 March 2012

Olympic Games
- Teams: 1 (2010)
- Medals: 3 (2 gold)

World Championships
- Teams: 6 (2007, 2008, 2009, 2010, 2011, 2012)
- Medals: 17 (12 gold)

World Cup
- Seasons: 7 (2005–06 – 2011–12)
- Individual races: 151
- All races: 175
- Individual victories: 34
- All victories: 47
- Individual podiums: 63
- All podiums: 82
- Overall titles: 3 (2007–08, 2009–10, 2011–12)
- Discipline titles: 7: 1 Individual (2008–09); 3 Sprint (2007–08, 2010–11, 2011–12); 1 Pursuit (2009–10); 2 Mass Start (2007–08, 2009–10)
Medal record
Women's biathlon
Representing Germany
Event	1st	2nd	3rd
Olympic Games (3 medals)	2	1	0
World Championships (17 medals)	12	4	1
Junior/Youth World Championships (11 medals)	7	4	0
Total (31 medals)	21	9	1
Olympic Games
Gold medal – first place	2010 Vancouver	10 km pursuit
Gold medal – first place	2010 Vancouver	12.5 km mass start
Silver medal – second place	2010 Vancouver	7.5 km sprint
World Championships
Gold medal – first place	2007 Antholz-Anterselva	7.5 km sprint
Gold medal – first place	2007 Antholz-Anterselva	10 km pursuit
Gold medal – first place	2007 Antholz-Anterselva	4 × 6 km relay
Gold medal – first place	2008 Östersund	12.5 km mass start
Gold medal – first place	2008 Östersund	4 × 6 km relay
Gold medal – first place	2008 Östersund	Mixed relay
Gold medal – first place	2010 Khanty-Mansiysk	Mixed relay
Gold medal – first place	2011 Khanty-Mansiysk	7.5 km sprint
Gold medal – first place	2011 Khanty-Mansiysk	12.5 km mass start
Gold medal – first place	2011 Khanty-Mansiysk	4 × 6 km relay
Gold medal – first place	2012 Ruhpolding	7.5 km sprint
Gold medal – first place	2012 Ruhpolding	4 × 6 km relay
Silver medal – second place	2009 Pyeongchang	4 × 6 km relay
Silver medal – second place	2011 Khanty-Mansiysk	10 km pursuit
Silver medal – second place	2011 Khanty-Mansiysk	Mixed relay
Silver medal – second place	2012 Ruhpolding	10 km pursuit
Bronze medal – third place	2012 Ruhpolding	Mixed relay
Junior World Championships
Gold medal – first place	2004 Haute Maurienne	7.5 km sprint
Gold medal – first place	2004 Haute Maurienne	3 × 6 km relay
Gold medal – first place	2005 Kontiolahti	7.5 km sprint
Gold medal – first place	2006 Presque Isle	10 km pursuit
Gold medal – first place	2006 Presque Isle	3 × 6 km relay
Gold medal – first place	2008 Ruhpolding	7.5 km sprint
Gold medal – first place	2008 Ruhpolding	10 km pursuit
Silver medal – second place	2004 Haute Maurienne	10 km pursuit
Silver medal – second place	2005 Kontiolahti	10 km pursuit
Silver medal – second place	2005 Kontiolahti	3 × 6 km relay
Silver medal – second place	2006 Presque Isle	7.5 km sprint
European Championships
Bronze medal – third place	2006 Langdorf	Relay
- Updated on 18 March 2012

Magdalena "Lena" Holzer (née Neuner; German: [makdaˈleːna ˈnɔʏnɐ]; born 9 February 1987) is a retired German professional biathlete. She is the most successful woman of all time at Biathlon World Championships and a two-time Olympic gold medalist. At the age of 21, she became the youngest Overall World Cup winner in the history of the International Biathlon Union (IBU). With 34 World Cup wins, Neuner is ranked second all-time for career victories on the Biathlon World Cup tour. She has won the Overall World Cup title three times, in 2007–08, in 2009–10 and her final season in 2011–12. At only 25 years old, Neuner retired from the sport in March 2012, citing a lack of motivation and her desire for a normal life.

Neuner started biathlon when she was nine years old and won five junior world championship titles from 2004 to 2006. She made her World Cup debut in 2006 and won her first World Cup race in January 2007. One month later, she claimed three gold medals in her first appearance at the Biathlon World Championships. In the 2007–08 season, Neuner won the Overall World Cup and once more claimed three titles at the 2008 World Championships. After a less successful winter in 2008–09, she participated in her first Winter Olympic Games in 2010, winning the gold medal in both the pursuit and the mass start, and silver in the sprint race. Neuner also claimed the 2009–10 Overall World Cup title. At the 2011 World Championships, she won three more gold medals. In her final winter on the World Cup tour, Neuner won two more titles at the 2012 World Championships and claimed the Overall World Cup for a third time.

During her seven World Cup seasons, Neuner won 34 World Cup races and achieved 63 podium finishes. As part of Germany's World Cup team, she won ten relay races and three mixed relay events. During six appearances at Biathlon World Championships, Neuner claimed 17 medals: twelve gold, four silver and one bronze. In addition, she has won seven junior world championship titles. Neuner was known as one of the fastest cross-country skiers in biathlon. She had been noted for her volatile shooting performances in the standing position, particularly in the early years of her career, often at the expense of better results.

Neuner has lived in the Bavarian village of Wallgau since birth. At the age of 16, she joined the German Customs Administration to become a member of the government-funded Customs-Ski-Team. Since winning three world championship gold medals in 2007, Neuner is one of her home country's most popular female athletes. She was named German Sportswoman of the Year in 2007, 2011 and 2012.

== Early life ==
Magdalena Neuner was born in the German alpine resort town of Garmisch-Partenkirchen, the second of four children of bank clerk Paul Neuner and his wife Margit. She has an elder brother Paul, and two younger siblings—her brother Christoph and her sister Anna. Her sister is also an aspiring biathlete who participates in junior competitions and is a member in the youth squad of the Bavarian Ski Association.

Neuner grew up in the small Bavarian village of Wallgau, approximately 15 kilometres (9.3 mi) from Garmisch-Partenkirchen. She started alpine skiing when she was four years old and later tried various other winter sports at her hometown ski club SC Wallgau. At the age of 16, Neuner finished high school (Realschule) in Garmisch-Partenkirchen and decided to pursue a career in biathlon. Her parents were reluctant, but they eventually supported her ambition to become a professional biathlete.

== Career ==
=== Early career and World Cup debut ===
Neuner started biathlon when she was nine years old after she had participated in a try out course at her local ski club. She won 29 races at the biathlon Student's Cup of the German Ski Association (DSV), claiming the overall title in her respective age-group for four years in a row from 1999 to 2002. After finishing school, Neuner joined the German Customs Administration in August 2003 to become a member in the government-supported Customs-Ski-Team (Zoll-Ski-Team). She officially holds the rank of Erste Zollhauptwachtmeisterin (first head customs officer), although she is a full-time professional athlete with no customs obligations. One of her team mates is alpine skiing world champion Maria Höfl-Riesch.

In December 2003, Neuner won the German Cup for 17-year-olds, which led to her appointment for the 2003–04 European Cup competition for juniors. With four wins at European level, Neuner qualified for the 2004 Junior/Youth World Championships in Haute Maurienne, France, where she won the sprint and relay events, as well as silver in the pursuit. One year later at the 2005 Junior/Youth World Championships in Kontiolahti, Finland, she claimed two silver medals (pursuit and relay), and again won the sprint discipline. With her success at junior level, Neuner at 18 years old, was considered one of Germany's biggest biathlon talents ever. Even before achieving any results at senior level, she had signed a sponsorship deal.

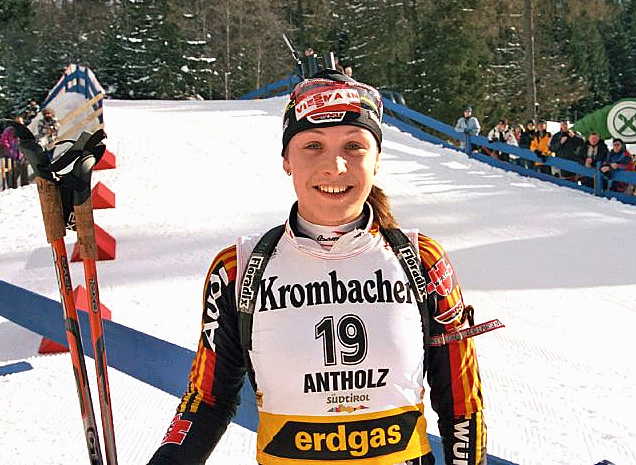
Neuner at the World Cup in Antholz, January 2006

2005–06 World Cup season results
No.	World Cup location	Individual	Sprint	Pursuit	Mass start	Relay
5	Ruhpolding, Germany	–	41	21	–	DNS
6	Antholz, Italy	–	19	11	DNS	–
Biathlon at the 2006 Winter Olympics	Turin, Italy	Not nominated				
7	Pokljuka, Slovenia	–	DNS	DNS	–	–
8	Kontiolahti, Finland	–	4	20	9	–
9	Oslo, Norway	–	18	13	25	–
Key:"—" denotes discipline not held; DNS—Did not start

During the 2005–06 season, Neuner made her first appearances in the Biathlon World Cup. Germany's women's national coach Uwe Müßiggang had already considered her for the team two years earlier, however, her parents and her hometown coaches Bernhard Kröll and Herbert Mayer were reluctant to let her start prematurely. On 13 January 2006, Neuner made her debut in the World Cup sprint race in Ruhpolding, Germany, where she substituted for the injured Uschi Disl. Although her first appearance ended unsuccessfully, coming in 41st place, she was appointed for nine more World Cup races for the remainder of the season.

Neuner returned as one of the favourites at the 2006 Junior/Youth World Championships in Presque Isle, Maine, United States, where she won two more titles (pursuit and relay) in addition to a silver medal in the sprint race. She did not participate in the 2006 Winter Olympics for the German team. At the World Cup in Kontiolahti in March 2006, Neuner achieved her first top ten finishes: she was fourth in the sprint and came in ninth in the mass start race.

=== Three world championship titles (2006–07 season) ===
2006–07 World Cup season results
No.	World Cup location	Individual	Sprint	Pursuit	Mass start	Relay	Mixed relay
1	Östersund, Sweden	33	15	7	–	–	–
2	Hochfilzen, Austria	–	27	8	–	2	–
3	Hochfilzen, Austria	DNS	9	–	–	DNS	–
4	Oberhof, Germany	–	1	3	–	DNS	–
5	Ruhpolding, Germany	–	16	–	15	2	–
6	Pokljuka, Slovenia	–	10	9	DNS	–	–
WCH	Antholz, Italy	DNS	1	1	14	1	DNS
7	Lahti, Finland	6	24	40	–	–	–
8	Oslo, Norway	–	3	1	1	–	–
9	Khanty-Mansiysk, Russia	–	1	1	8	–	–
Key:"—" denotes discipline not held; DNS—Did not start; WCH—World Championships

While she had only competed in ten races during her first World Cup winter, Neuner became a fixture in the German team in the 2006–07 season. She proved to be one of the fastest cross-country skiers in biathlon, and at 19 years old, regularly set the fastest course times.^{[note a]} On 5 January 2007, Neuner won her first World Cup event, the sprint race in Oberhof, Germany. Her victory on home soil, before a crowd of 19,000 people, received considerable media attention and put her into the national spotlight for the first time. Two days later at the pursuit race, she forgot to reload her rifle after a warm-up. She was handed a new magazine during the prone shooting and managed to finish third despite a total of six shooting errors.

Neuner was scheduled to compete at the junior world championships in 2007. However, following her first World Cup win, she was instead appointed for the senior World Championships in Antholz, Italy. On 3 February 2007, she won gold in the sprint, beating Sweden's Anna Carin Olofsson by 2.3 seconds. It was her first world championship event ever and only her second victory at senior level.^{[note b]} One day later, she also claimed the pursuit title, in spite of four shooting errors. Following a 14th place in the mass start, Neuner, alongside Martina Beck, Andrea Henkel and Kati Wilhelm, also won gold in the relay race on 11 February 2007. With three titles, she was the championship's most successful athlete and became the youngest triple world champion.

At the end of the season, she continued her successful run with four more World Cup wins. In March 2007, Neuner won the pursuit and mass start races at Holmenkollen in Oslo, Norway, and she won the sprint and pursuit events at the season final in Khanty-Mansiysk, Russia, giving her seven career World Cup wins. She ended her first complete season fourth in the Overall World Cup standings and finished second in the pursuit discipline. In the course of three months, Neuner had emerged from anonymity to become one of Germany's most popular female athletes. At the end of 2007, she had earned an estimated 1.3 million euros through sponsorship and endorsement deals.

=== Overall World Cup winner (2007–08 season) ===
2007–08 World Cup season results
No.	World Cup location	Individual	Sprint	Pursuit	Mass start	Relay	Mixed relay
1	Kontiolahti, Finland	30	7	17	–	–	–
2	Hochfilzen, Austria	–	13	4	–	DNS	–
3	Pokljuka, Slovenia	7	3	–	–	1	–
4	Oberhof, Germany	–	3	–	1	DNS	–
5	Ruhpolding, Germany	–	11	16	–	1	–
6	Antholz, Italy	–	8	4	4	–	–
WCH	Östersund, Sweden	DNS	17	6	1	1	1
7	Pyeongchang, South Korea	–	1	6	–	–	–
8	Khanty-Mansiysk, Russia	–	1	5	2	–	–
9	Oslo, Norway	–	7	7	9	–	–
Key:"—" denotes discipline not held; DNS—Did not start; WCH—World Championships

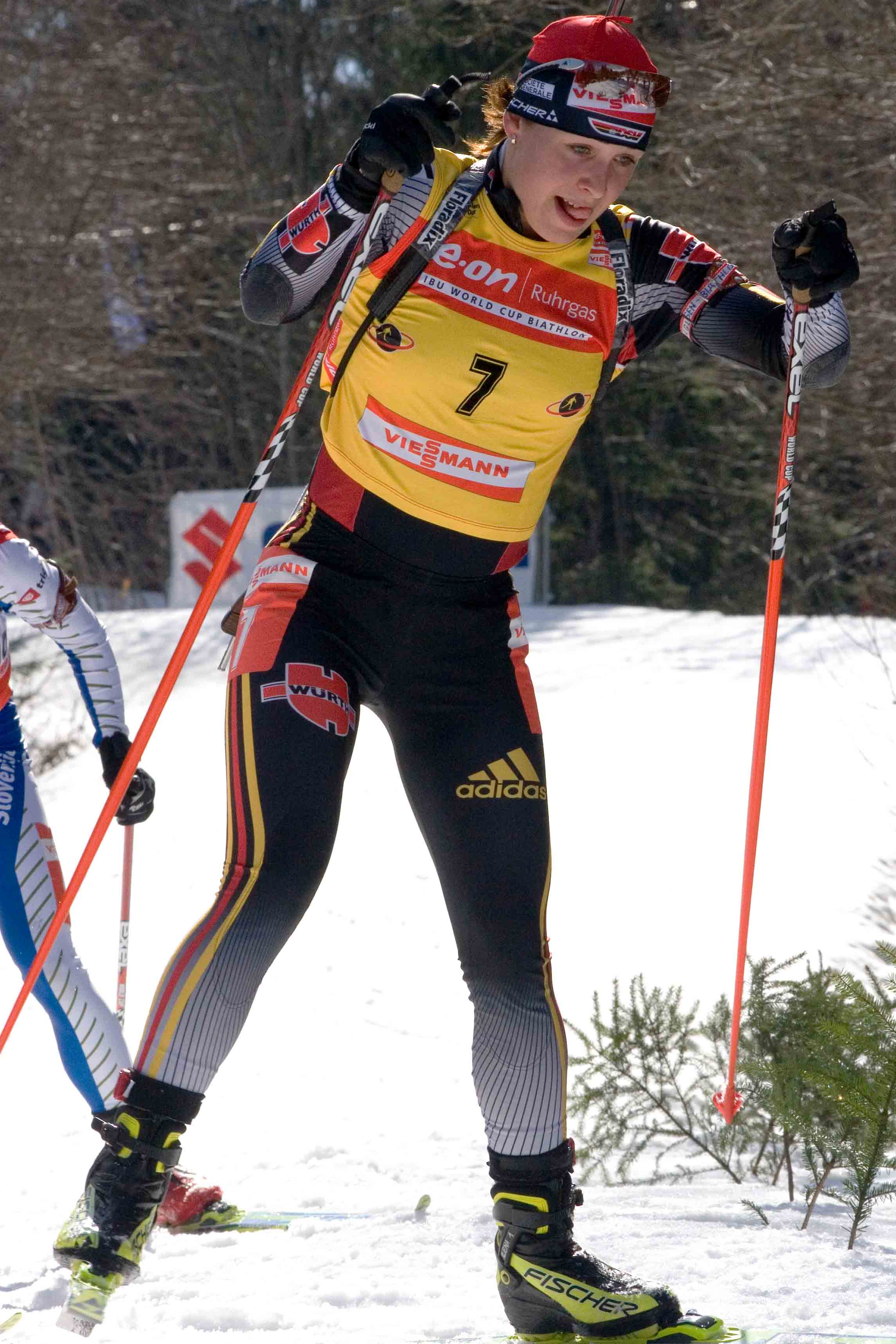
Neuner in the yellow bib of the Overall World Cup leader, March 2008

After missing the podium at the 2007–08 season's first two World Cups, Neuner was part of Germany's winning relay team in Pokljuka, Slovenia in December 2007. She claimed her eighth World Cup win at the mass start in Oberhof in January 2008, and later that month won the relay race in Ruhpolding with the German team. Shortly before her 21st birthday, Neuner decided to again compete at the Junior/Youth World Championships, held in Ruhpolding in January 2008—the last time she was eligible to enter. She won gold in the sprint and the pursuit, but withdrew from the individual race to prepare for the senior world championships alongside her German team mates.

Leading up to the 2008 World Championships in Östersund, Sweden, Neuner tried to lower expectations, stating a repeat of last year's performance would be impossible. She failed to defend her titles in the sprint and pursuit races, with shooting errors preventing better results; she finished 17th and sixth respectively. On 12 February 2008, she won the mixed relay with Sabrina Buchholz, Andreas Birnbacher and Michael Greis to claim her first gold medal. Four days later, she won her second title in the mass start, beating Norway's Tora Berger by 3.0 seconds. She had four shooting errors compared to Berger's one and skied side by side with the Norwegian for most of the last lap, in what she later described as her hardest fought victory ever. Alongside Martina Beck, Andrea Henkel and Kati Wilhelm, Neuner also claimed gold in the relay race on 17 February 2008. By winning three more titles, she became the youngest six-time world champion, solidifying her status as Germany's biggest biathlon star.

In the following World Cups, she won the sprint races in Pyeongchang, South Korea, and in Khanty-Mansiysk—her tenth and eleventh World Cup victories. With a second-place finish in the penultimate mass start race of the season, Neuner won the 2007–08 Mass start World Cup. At the season final in Oslo, she also claimed the season's Sprint World Cup and took over the yellow bib of the Overall World Cup leader for the first time in her career. In the last race of the season, a ninth place in the mass start ensured Neuner the 2007–08 Overall Biathlon World Cup victory. She was the youngest Overall World Cup winner since the International Biathlon Union was established in 1993.^{[note c]}

=== First setbacks (2008–09 season) ===
2008–09 World Cup season results
No.	World Cup location	Individual	Sprint	Pursuit	Mass start	Relay	Mixed relay
1	Östersund, Sweden	3	3	17	–	–	–
2	Hochfilzen, Austria	–	21	29	–	DNS	–
3	Hochfilzen, Austria	6	5	–	–	1	–
4	Oberhof, Germany	–	11	–	4	DNS	–
5	Ruhpolding, Germany	–	1	1	–	1	–
6	Antholz, Italy	–	14	8	6	–	–
WCH	Pyeongchang, South Korea	DNS	8	11	7	2	DNS
7	Vancouver, Canada	4	2	–	–	1	–
8	Trondheim, Norway	–	25	18	14	–	–
9	Khanty-Mansiysk, Russia	–	4	1	12	–	–
Key:"—" denotes discipline not held; DNS—Did not start; WCH—World Championships

Neuner's preparation for the 2008–09 season was affected by several illnesses. In the summer, she battled an intestinal fungus which forced her to pause training for seven weeks; she later attributed it to pressure of public expectations. In October 2008, she contracted influenza and in November, a bacterial infection caused her to miss two weeks of training. Subsequently, her ski speed saw a substantial drop at the start of the season. In the first four World Cups, Neuner only achieved two individual podiums; atypically courtesy of good shooting performances, not her skiing.

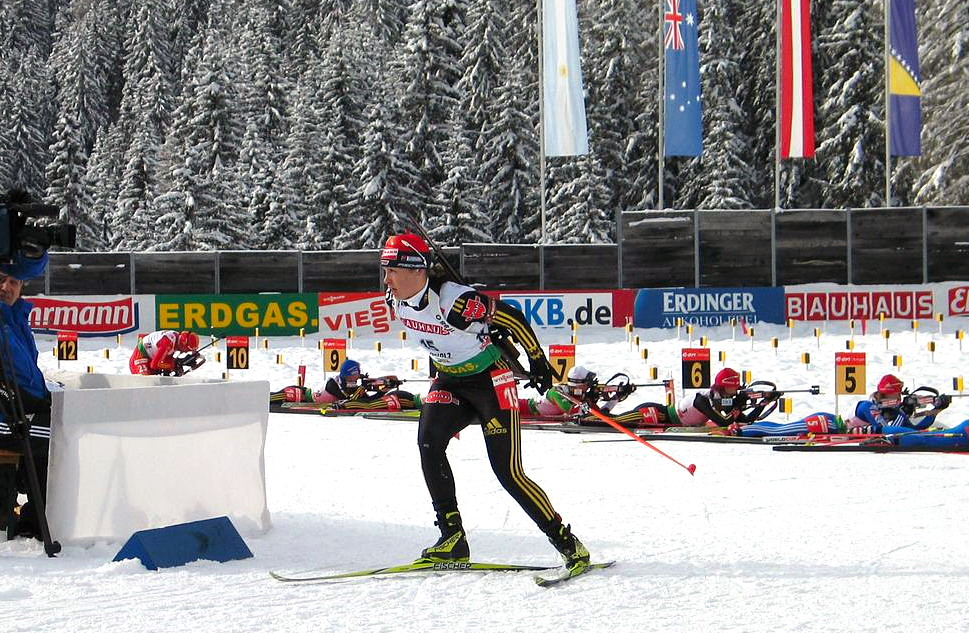
Neuner leaves the shooting range at the World Cup in Antholz, January 2009.

Following the Christmas break, her skiing times had improved. In Ruhpolding in January 2009, Neuner was part of the winning German relay team. She beat team mate Kati Wilhelm by 0.2 seconds in the Ruhpolding sprint and also won the following pursuit event, which marked her World Cup wins twelve and thirteen. Neuner again missed the podium in Antholz. She was leading the mass start by 53.6 seconds before the final shooting, in which she missed all five targets, eventually finishing sixth. This result received much public attention. She later described it as a pivotal moment in her career and called it the "total end of the world".

Neuner suffered further setbacks at the 2009 World Championships in Pyeongchang, where she struggled with a cold and a high number of shooting errors. She finished eighth in the sprint, in which she crashed on a downhill slope, and came in eleventh in the pursuit race. She was not appointed for the individual race and could not start in the mixed relay due to her cold. On 21 February 2009, Neuner claimed silver as part Germany's women's relay team, alongside Martina Beck, Andrea Henkel and Kati Wilhelm. On the last day of the championships, she came in seventh in the mass start race.

At the Olympic rehearsal in Vancouver, Canada, in March 2009, Neuner claimed the 2008–09 Individual World Cup, despite never having won a race in that discipline. She also won the Vancouver relay race with the German team, and was second in the sprint, 0.7 seconds behind Sweden's Helena Ekholm. At the season final in Khanty-Mansiysk, Neuner won the pursuit race—her 14th World Cup win. She ended the season fourth in the Overall Biathlon World Cup, which was generally considered disappointing in the media.

Neuner later revealed that due to public expectations and constant media attention, the 2008–09 season had been extremely difficult for her psychologically, and she even briefly contemplated retirement. She started working with a psychologist and cut down her media appearances as much as possible in the summer.

=== Double Olympic champion (2009–10 season) ===
2009–10 World Cup season results
No.	World Cup location	Individual	Sprint	Pursuit	Mass start	Relay	Mixed relay
1	Östersund, Sweden	DNS	DNS	–	–	DNS	–
2	Hochfilzen, Austria	–	29	28	–	DNS	–
3	Pokljuka, Slovenia	18	3	2	–	–	–
4	Oberhof, Germany	–	DNS	–	DNS	DNS	–
5	Ruhpolding, Germany	–	3	–	3	4	–
6	Antholz, Italy	1	1	2	–	–	–
Biathlon at the 2010 Winter Olympics	Vancouver, Canada	10	2	1	1	DNS	–
7	Kontiolahti, Finland	–	5	2	–	–	2
8	Oslo, Norway	–	6	8	3	–	–
9	Khanty-Mansiysk, Russia	–	8	–	1	–	1
Key:"—" denotes discipline not held; DNS—Did not start

Neuner competed at the Summer Biathlon World Championships for the first time in September 2009 when they were held in Oberhof. She only reluctantly agreed to interrupt training and participate in the summer event, which is contested on roller ski, however she went on to win gold in all three competitions (sprint, pursuit and mixed relay). Neuner missed the first World Cup of the 2009–10 season due to a cold in December 2009. She returned at the following races in Hochfilzen, but was still affected by her cold and finished outside the top 20. Her first podiums of the winter came in Pokljuka, finishing third in the sprint and second in the pursuit race. Thereby she secured her Olympic qualification within the German team.

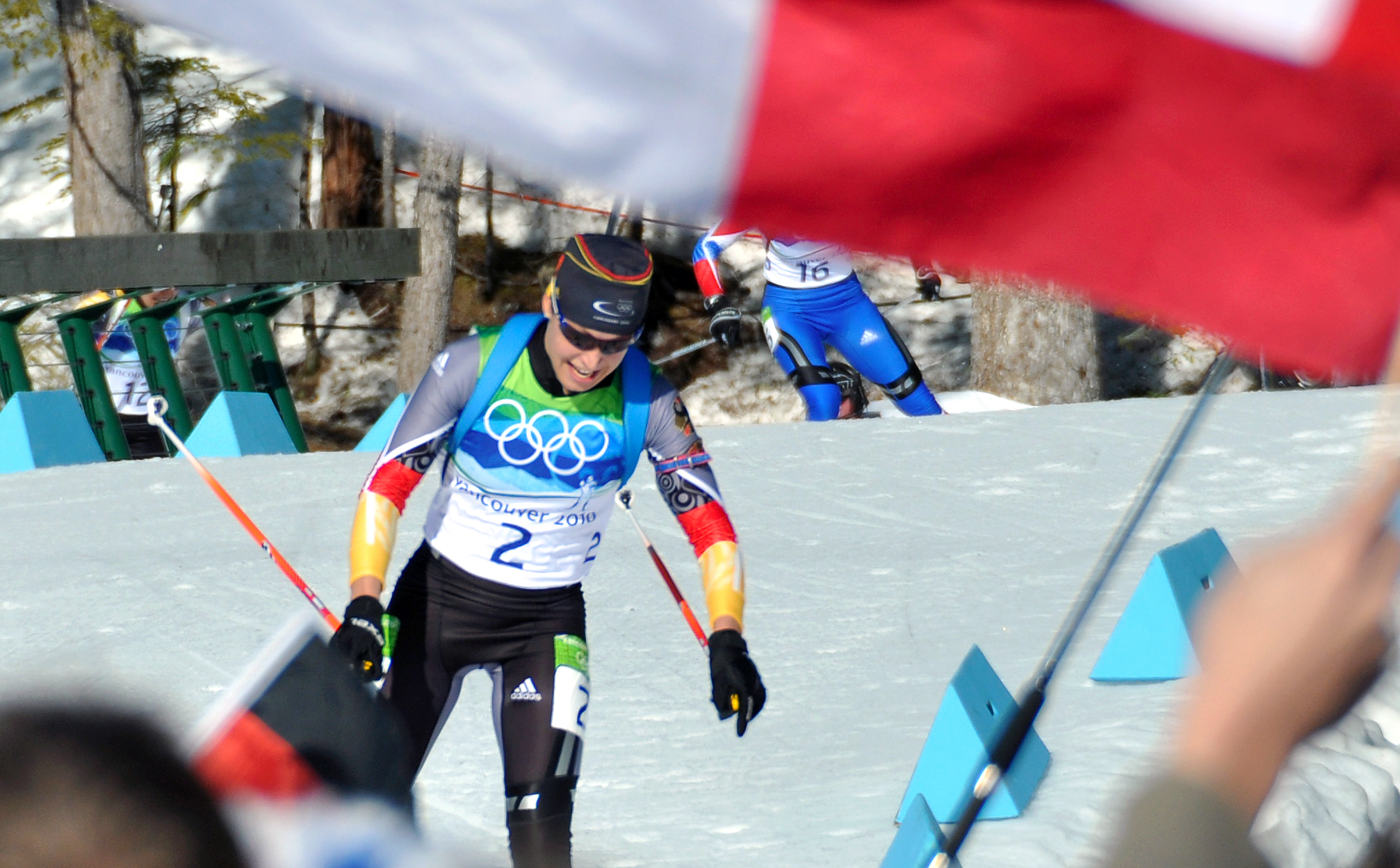
Neuner shortly before crossing the finish line during the Olympic mass start race

Shortly before the Oberhof sprint in January 2010, Neuner injured her back during warm-up and had to withdraw. She returned in Ruhpolding where she came in third in both the sprint and the mass start race. In her first relay of the season, she dealt a blow to the German team by incurring two penalty loops, with Germany finishing fourth eventually. With some top competitors missing in Antholz at the last World Cup before the 2010 Winter Olympics, Neuner won two events—the first individual race of her career as well as the sprint, giving her 16 career World Cup wins. She also came in second in the pursuit, which marked her seventh consecutive podium finish.

Neuner went into her first Winter Olympics in Vancouver with the declared aim of winning a gold medal. On 13 February 2010, she participated in the opening sprint, which was contested at Whistler Olympic Park in rainy conditions. With one shooting error, Neuner claimed the silver medal, finishing 1.5 seconds behind Slovakia's Anastasiya Kuzmina. She uncharacteristically lost five seconds against the unheralded Slovak on the cross-country course, which led to speculation of inferior ski preparation in the German media. Three days later, Neuner won gold in the subsequent pursuit race. Despite missing two targets in the standing position, she beat sprint winner Kuzmina by 12.3 seconds. In her third Olympic event, she finished tenth in the individual. She had three shooting mistakes and said it had been difficult for her to immediately get her concentration back after winning her first gold medal. On 21 February 2010, Neuner claimed her second gold of the Games in the mass start. After missing two targets, she had been trailing by as much as 29 seconds, but she pushed the pace and a clean final standing shoot allowed her to overtake Russia's Olga Zaitseva on the last lap. After the race, Neuner made the announcement not to participate in the relay, citing mental exhaustion and her desire to give all of her team mates the chance to win a medal. Her withdrawal allowed her friend Martina Beck a start in her last Olympic Games. Neuner was Germany's most successful athlete in Vancouver and was chosen to carry the German flag at the closing ceremony.

Following her Olympic success, Neuner continued her good form at the season's remaining three World Cups, finishing all races in the top ten. She came in second in the Kontiolahti pursuit, and third in Oslo's mass start race, which increased her World Cup lead after taking over the yellow bib in Vancouver. Neuner ended the season with her 19th World Cup win in Khanty-Mansiysk's mass start, which ensured her the 2009–10 Overall World Cup, making her the first German woman to win the Biathlon World Cup for a second time. She also won the pursuit and mass start discipline World Cups. In the last event of the winter, the Mixed Relay World Championship, she won gold, alongside Simone Hauswald, Simon Schempp and Arnd Peiffer, to claim her seventh world title.

=== Record world champion (2010–11 season) ===
2010–11 World Cup season results
No.	World Cup location	Individual	Sprint	Pursuit	Mass start	Relay	Mixed relay
1	Östersund, Sweden	DNS	DNS	DNS	–	–	–
2	Hochfilzen, Austria	–	7	7	–	1	–
3	Pokljuka, Slovenia	8	1	–	–	–	DNS
4	Oberhof, Germany	–	2	–	9	6	–
5	Ruhpolding, Germany	16	3	8	–	–	–
6	Antholz, Italy	–	DNS	–	6	DNS	–
7	Presque Isle, United States	–	6	4	–	–	1
8	Fort Kent, United States	–	3	2	1	–	–
WCH	Khanty-Mansiysk, Russia	5	1	2	1	1	2
9	Oslo, Norway	–	1	DNS	6	–	–
Key:"—" denotes discipline not held; DNS—Did not start; WCH—World Championships

During the summer, Neuner admitted struggling for motivation for the upcoming season, having won every title in the sport at only 23 years old. However, she vowed to continue her career at least until the 2012 world championships in Ruhpolding. In December 2010 she suffered from a cold, missing the season's first World Cup in Östersund for the second year in a row. She started the 2010–11 season in Hochfilzen, where she managed two seventh-place finishes, and was part of the winning German relay team. At the third stop of the season in Pokljuka, she won the sprint race in spite of two shooting errors, claiming her 20th career victory.

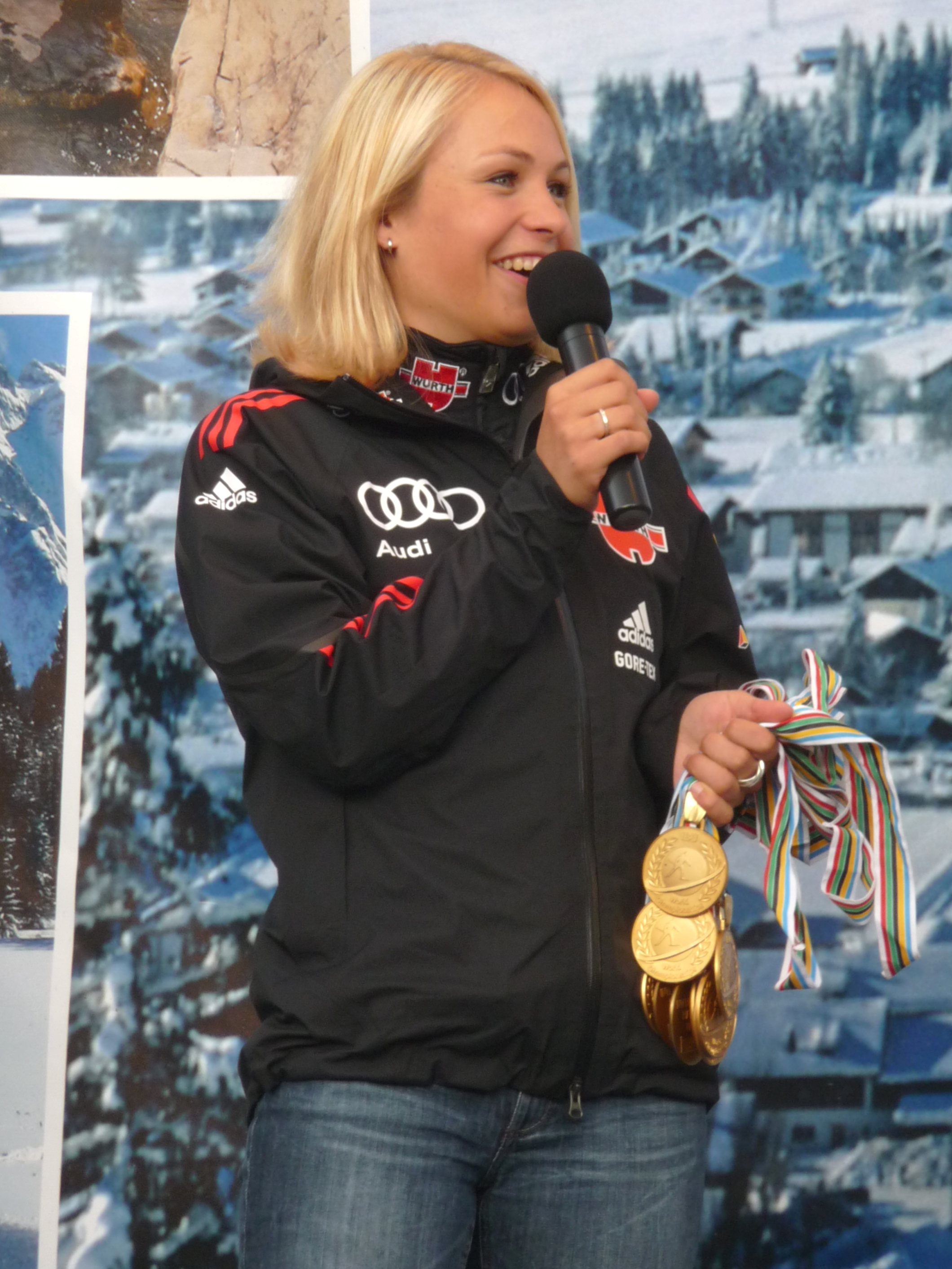
Neuner with her ten Biathlon World Championships gold medals

Neuner continued the winter with mixed results in January 2011. She reached the podium in the sprints of Oberhof and Ruhpolding, coming in second and third respectively. In the relay in Oberhof, Neuner was part of Germany's team coming in sixth place, the team's worst result since 2005. She also had her worst personal result in 13 months, finishing in 16th place in the Ruhpolding individual race, which ended her streak of 24 consecutive top ten finishes (including 15 podiums and 6 wins). At the World Cup in Antholz, Neuner again struggled with illness. She only participated in the concluding mass start, coming in 6th place.

At the World Cup stops in February in the United States, Neuner returned to good health and showed more consistency; her worst result was a 6th-place finish. In Presque Isle, Maine, she won the mixed relay as part of the German team. One week later in Fort Kent, Maine, Neuner finished all three races on the podium. She came in third in the sprint, second in the pursuit, and claimed her 21st World Cup win in the mass start—the last race before the world championships.

At the 2011 World Championships in Khanty-Mansiysk, Neuner won three gold and two silver medals. She claimed silver, alongside Andrea Henkel, Arnd Peiffer and Michael Greis, in the opening mixed relay. On 5 March 2011, Neuner won the sprint race courtesy of a clean shooting performance. She finished second in the pursuit and fifth in the individual subsequently. On 12 March 2011, Neuner won her second title in the mass start despite four shooting errors. The following day she also claimed gold in the women's relay, together with Andrea Henkel, Miriam Gössner and Tina Bachmann. Running the last leg for Germany, Neuner started in fourth, 67.5 seconds off the lead, but she pulled back the entire time and moved in front on the last lap. Her five medals made her the most successful female athlete in the history of Biathlon World Championships.

The season ended in disappointment for Neuner in Oslo. After claiming her 24th career win in the sprint, she had moved into second place in the Overall World Cup ranking. However, she again suffered from a cold and had to pull out of the penultimate race of the winter, the pursuit in which she would have started 31 seconds in front. This effectively ended her hopes of retaining the World Cup crown. She eventually finished fifth in the overall standings, having missed five of the season's 26 races.

=== Final World Cup winter (2011–12 season) ===
2011–12 World Cup season results
No.	World Cup location	Individual	Sprint	Pursuit	Mass start	Relay	Mixed relay
1	Östersund, Sweden	3	1	3	–	–	–
2	Hochfilzen, Austria	–	1	3	–	6	–
3	Hochfilzen, Austria	–	4	12	–	–	DNS
4	Oberhof, Germany	–	1	–	1	4	–
5	Nové Město, Czech Republic	3	3	7	–	–	–
6	Antholz, Italy	–	1	–	3	6	–
7	Oslo, Norway	–	1	1	DNS	–	–
8	Kontiolahti, Finland	–	1	2	–	–	DNS
WCH	Ruhpolding, Germany	23	1	2	10	1	3
9	Khanty-Mansiysk, Russia	–	1	4	6	–	–
Key:"—" denotes discipline not held; DNS—Did not start; WCH—World Championships

Before the start of the 2011–12 season, Neuner hinted the upcoming season might be her last. She began the winter in Östersund with the best season start of her career, beating Tora Berger by 0.2 seconds in the sprint to claim her 25th World Cup win. She also came third in the individual and the pursuit, and took the yellow bib of the Overall World Cup leader. On 6 December 2011, Neuner announced her retirement from biathlon by the end of the season on her homepage. She explained her early departure from the sport (at age 25) with a lack of motivation and her desire for a normal life. Neuner nonetheless continued her good form in Hochfilzen, where she claimed her 26th World Cup win in the sprint.

After Christmas, Neuner won both individual races in Oberhof – her World Cup wins 27 and 28. In the women's relay, she incurred 4 penalties in the final shooting, which foiled a likely German victory. Neuner suffered one of the biggest mishaps of her career, when she fired on the wrong targets in the Nove Mesto pursuit, dropping from first to seventh place. She recovered quickly by winning the sprint race in Antholz one week later. In February, Neuner claimed a double sprint and pursuit victory in Oslo despite suffering from a cold, which forced her to withdraw from the mass start. At the last World Cup stop before the world championships in Kontiolahti, she reached her sixth sprint win of the season, and extended her World Cup lead over Darya Domracheva.

At the 2012 World Championships in Ruhpolding, Neuner won bronze in the opening mixed relay, alongside Andrea Henkel, Andreas Birnbacher and Arnd Peiffer. On 3 March 2012, she claimed her 11th world title in the sprint race courtesy of her clean shooting. Neuner dropped to second place one day later in the pursuit, in which Domracheva overtook her at the final shooting bout. During the second week of the championships, Neuner often struggled with her shooting. She only reached 23rd place in the individual – her worst world championships result ever. With Tina Bachmann, Miriam Gössner and Andrea Henkel she won her second gold medal in Ruhpolding in the women's relay on 10 March 2012, despite incurring a penalty loop. In the concluding mass start, Neuner came in tenth place, with six shooting mistakes in total. Her 12th gold medal made her the second most successful biathlete of all time at world championships, behind male record holder Ole Einar Bjørndalen.

Having led the standings uninterruptedly since the second race of the winter, Neuner won her third Overall World Cup title at the season final in Russia, where she claimed her 34th and final World Cup win in the sprint. Neuner also won the 2011–12 Sprint World Cup thanks to an unprecedented eight out of ten sprint wins. With ten victories in total, her final World Cup season was the most successful in her career. She also became only the second woman after Magdalena Forsberg to win the overall title more than twice. On 18 March 2012, Neuner ended her biathlon career with a sixth place in the Khanty-Mansiysk mass start.

== Skiing ==
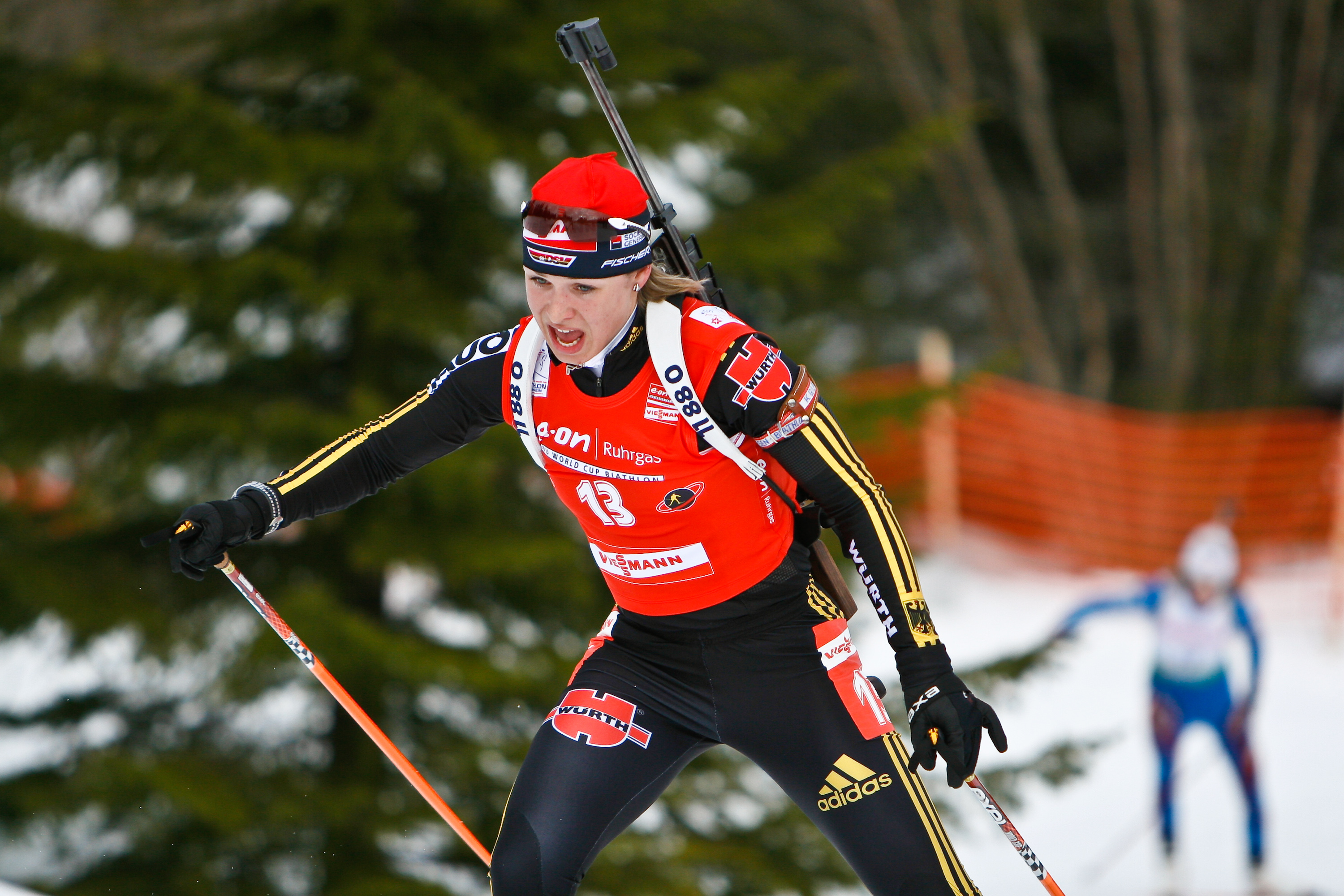
Neuner skies uphill at a World Cup race in Trondheim, March 2009.

Neuner was one of the fastest female cross-country skiers in biathlon. During 66 of her 151 World Cup races (44%), she has set the fastest course time (race time without time spent at the shooting range or in the penalty loop).^{[note a]} In addition, she has been among the top three fastest skiers in 77% of her career races.

In her first World Cup races in the 2005–06 season, Neuner achieved average course times; her best result was being fourth fastest in the pursuit race in Kontiolahti. During her first full season in 2006–07, she finished among the top three fastest skiers in 19 of her 24 races and came in fastest in seven of them. Neuner won the 2007–08 Biathlon World Cup with dominating skiing performances. She set the fastest course time in 19 of her 25 races and was second or third fastest in the remaining six. At the beginning of the 2008–09 season, Neuner had a substantial drop in her skiing times due to a series of illnesses. However, she recovered and set the fastest course time in 14 of the remaining 18 races from January onwards. In the 2009–10 Olympic season, Neuner again started slowly in December, but came back finishing among the top three fastest skiers in 17 of her 21 races. She had her second best winter in 2010–11 when she set the fastest or second fastest skiing time in 90% of her 21 races.

Neuner had been a fast cross-country skier from an early age. When she was eight years old, she won the first cross-country skiing competition she entered at her local ski club. At junior level, her lap times at the German Student's Cup were comparable to older or male opponents. At the age of 15, Neuner managed to set the same skiing times as her coeval male training partners. In preparation for the 2006–07 season, Neuner skied 5,300 kilometres (3,300 mi) in training; she increased the volume to 6,000 kilometres (3,700 mi) for the 2007–08 season. Because of her ski speed, she has often been able to compensate for one or sometimes two or three shooting errors (a penalty loop is 150 metres (160 yd) long and normally takes 21 to 26 seconds).

During three of her 32 World Cup wins (2007 World Championships pursuit, 2008 World Championships mass start, and 2009 Ruhpolding pursuit), Neuner skied three additional penalty loops compared to the second-place finisher. In March 2008, she came in second in the Khanty-Mansiysk mass start race, despite completing five penalty loops. She also reached third place in the Oberhof pursuit in January 2007 with six missed targets. At Neuner's first World Cup victory in the individual discipline in January 2010, she compensated for a total time penalty of two minutes on the 15 kilometres (9.3 mi) cross-country course (incurred by two additional shooting errors).

=== Skiing statistics ===
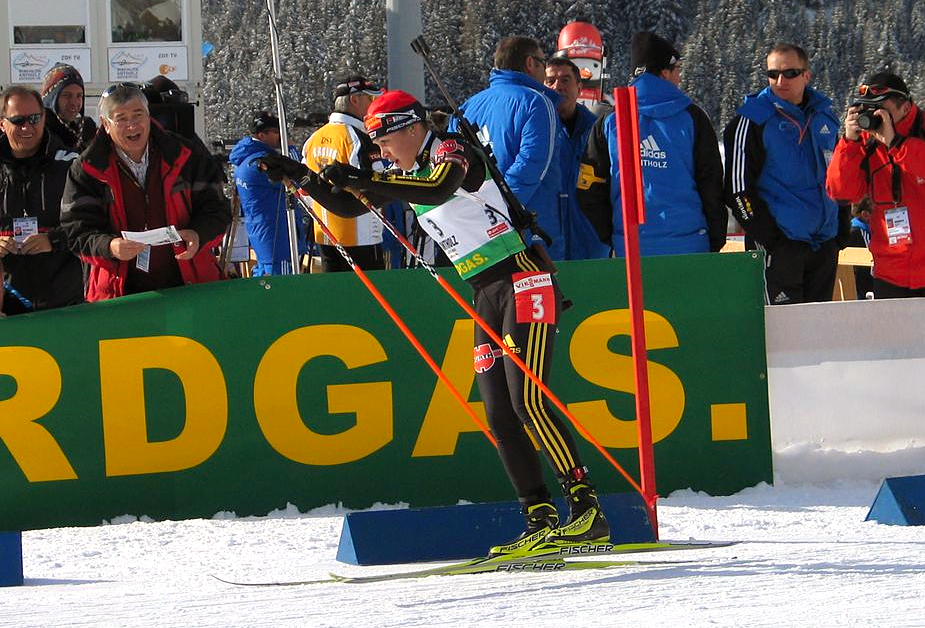
Neuner using the cross-country skating technique, March 2009

Course times	2005–06 season		2006–07 season		2007–08 season		2008–09 season		2009–10 season		2010–11 season		2011–12 season		Career	
Fastest	0 / 10	0%	7 / 24	29%	19 / 25	76%	14 / 25	56%	9 / 21	43%	12 / 21	57%	5 / 25	20%	66 / 151	44%
2nd fastest	0 / 10	0%	5 / 24	21%	4 / 25	16%	1 / 25	4%	7 / 21	33%	7 / 21	33%	7 / 25	28%	31 / 151	21%
3rd fastest	0 / 10	0%	7 / 24	29%	2 / 25	8%	3 / 25	12%	1 / 21	5%	0 / 21	0%	7 / 25	28%	20 / 151	13%
Other	10 / 10	100%	5 / 24	21%	0 / 25	0%	7 / 25	28%	4 / 21	19%	2 / 21	10%	6 / 25	24%	34 / 151	23%

*Key:Number of respective times achieved / number of all races entered, percentage. Results in IBU World Cup races, no relay events.
**Statistics as of 18 March 2012.

== Shooting ==
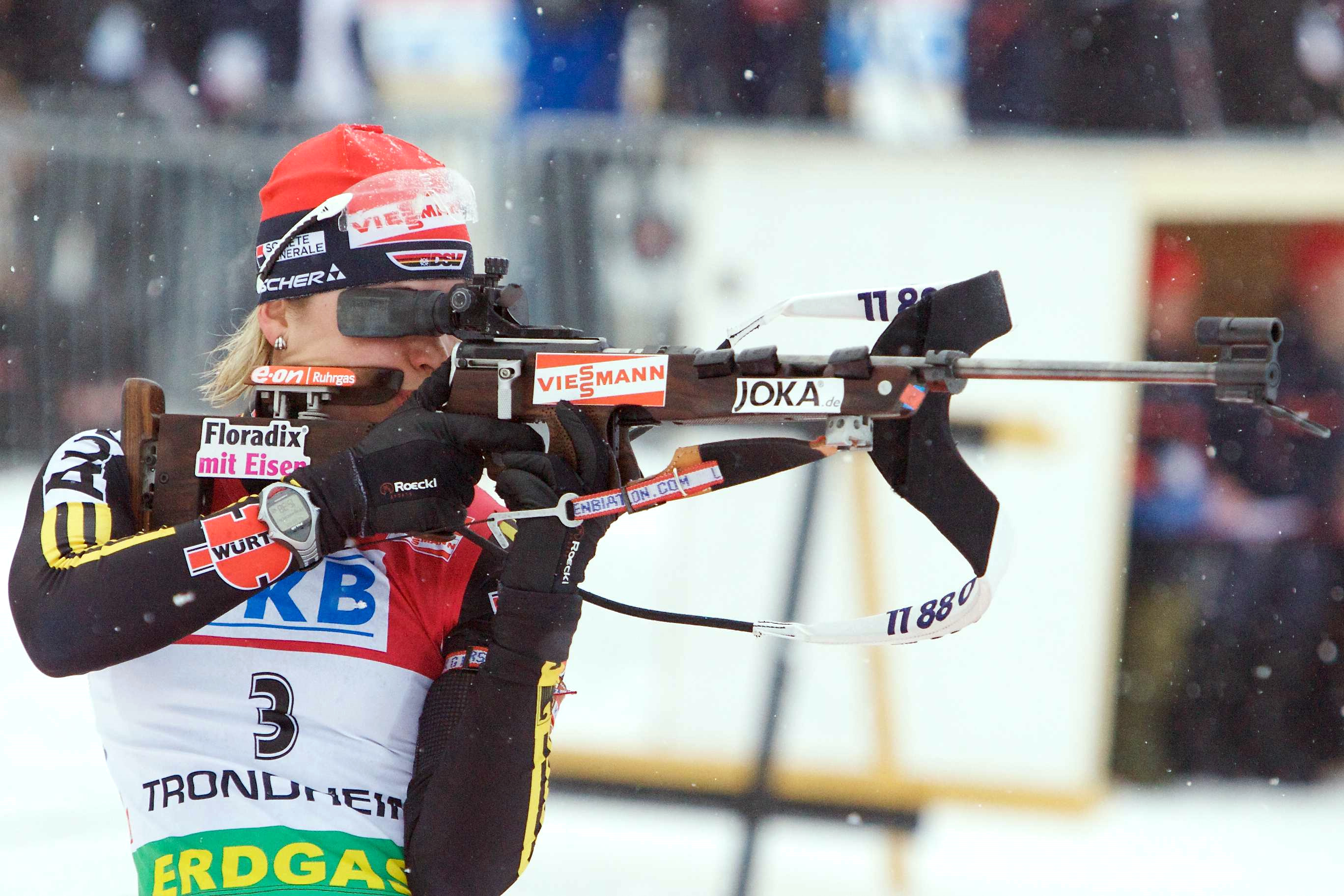
Neuner shooting at the World Cup in Trondheim, March 2009

Neuner averaged a career shooting accuracy of 78%. Her career average in the prone position was 88%, while her career average in the standing position was 67%. Her shooting results in the prone position were similar to other top contenders. The standing shoot had long been her weak point and her hit percentage was well below average in the World Cup field, although it had improved considerably in her later seasons.

With a 78% accuracy, Neuner had solid shooting results during her 2005–06 season debut. Her average dropped to 74% in her first complete season in 2006–07. Neuner won the 2007–08 Biathlon World Cup with a shooting accuracy of 73%, which is the lowest result for an Overall World Cup winner ever and roughly ten per cent below the previous three winners' averages: Andrea Henkel (84%), Kati Wilhelm (87%) and Sandrine Bailly (81%). She steadily increased her shooting percentages in the following two seasons with a 76% average in 2008–09, and her career best results of 82% in the 2009–10 Olympic season. In the 2010–11 season, she set her career high in the standing position with a 75% accuracy.

Neuner's shooting performances have been a regular topic in the German media. At times she has been reluctant to discuss her shooting in interviews and has said the public's fixation on it contributes to the problem. She has insisted her difficulties in the standing position are not due to technical weaknesses but psychological, and her training results are just as good as the results of her team mates. She explained in interviews that she had developed a fear of the standing shooting over time, knowing she had to justify herself after the race if she missed. In 2008, Neuner trained with Bundeswehr shooting coach and former large calibre world champion, Rudi Krenn, and subsequently changed her stance slightly. Since 2009, she has worked with a psychologist, primarily focusing on mental techniques to build her confidence on the shooting range. Her standing position average has improved from 60% to 75% from 2008 to 2011. Neuner has been wearing ear plugs during some of the races in order to better concentrate while shooting. The individual race, which places a high emphasis on shooting, has traditionally been her worst discipline (each shooting error results in a one-minute time penalty, instead of a penalty loop).

Neuner has won 6 races (all sprints) with a perfect shooting record: Khanty-Mansiysk sprint in March 2007, 2011 World Championship sprint and 4 sprints in her final 2011–12 season. She also shot clean on two other occasions, the sprint in Kontiolahti in March 2006, coming in fourth place, and the Östersund sprint in December 2008, finishing third. Her worst shooting performance came in December 2008, with a total of nine shooting errors at the World Cup pursuit in Hochfilzen. Neuner's costliest shooting occurred during a mass start race in Antholz in January 2009. After 15 clean shots, she was leading by 53.6 seconds before the final shooting, in which she missed all five targets, eventually dropping to sixth place.

=== Shooting statistics ===
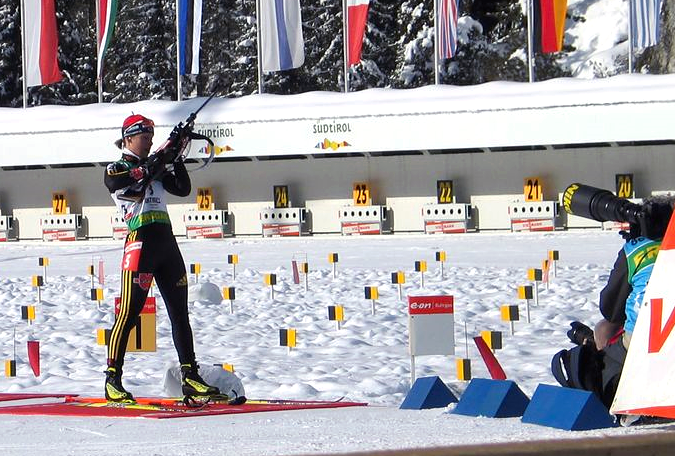
Neuner prepares to shoot in the standing position in Antholz, January 2009.

Shooting	2005–06 season		2006–07 season		2007–08 season		2008–09 season		2009–10 season		2010–11 season		2011–12 season		Career	
Prone position	73 / 80	91%	176 / 205	85%	194 / 223	87%	191 / 223	86%	171 / 188	91%	175 / 198	88%	206 / 232	89%	1186 / 1349	88%
Standing position	52 / 80	65%	135 / 213	63%	138 / 229	60%	150 / 228	66%	137 / 189	72%	150 / 200	75%	166 / 236	70%	928 / 1375	67%
Total	125 / 160	78%	311 / 418	74%	332 / 452	73%	341 / 451	76%	308 / 377	82%	325 / 398	82%	372 / 468	79%	2114 / 2724	78%

*Key:Hits / shots, percentage. Results in all IBU World Cup races including relay events.
**Statistics as of 18 March 2012.

== Personal life ==
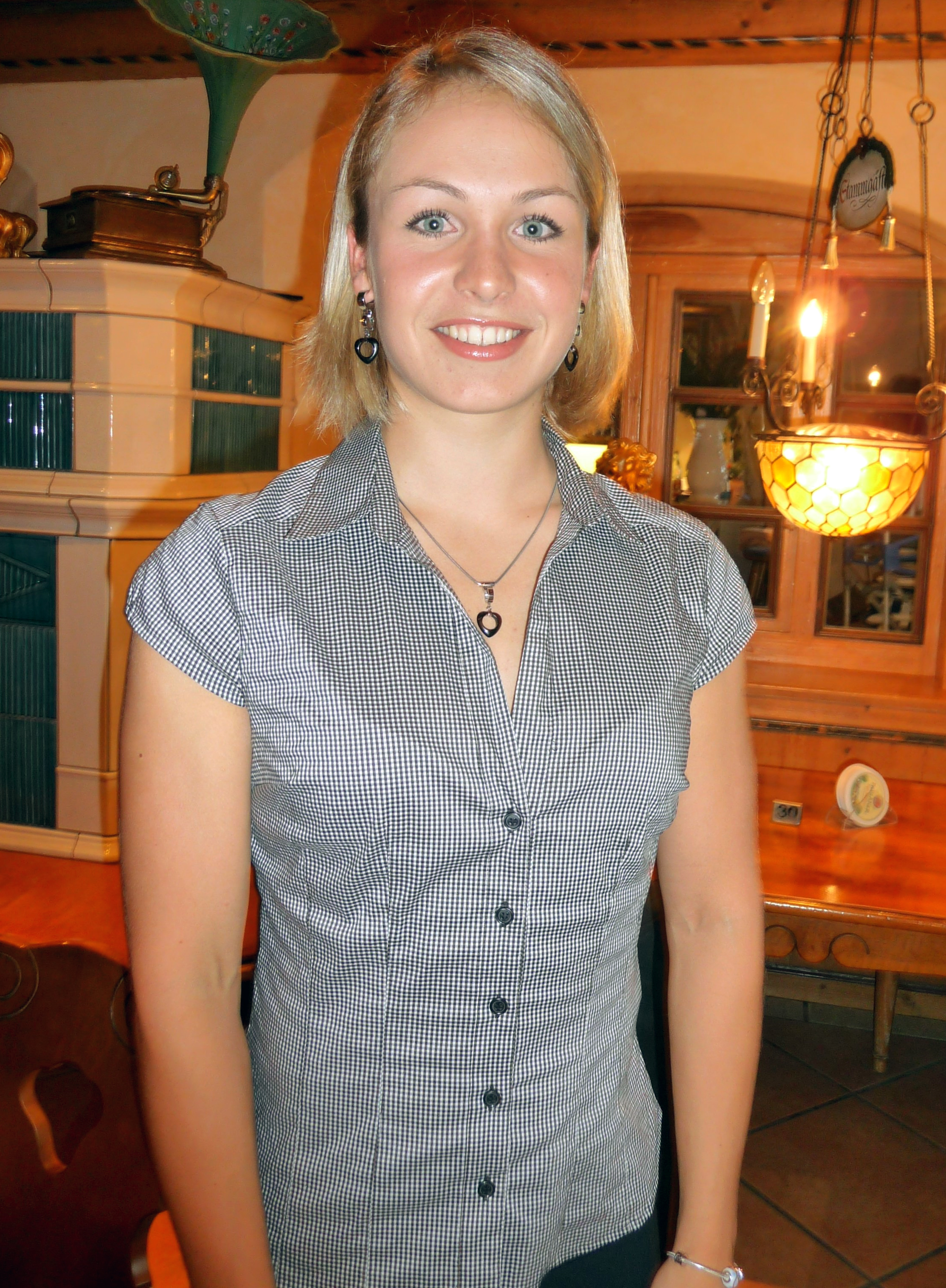
Neuner in Wallgau, Germany, May 2009

Neuner has lived in Wallgau, Bavaria, Germany, a small alpine village of 1,400 people, from birth. Neuner plays the harp and owns an enduro motorcycle. She has said she enjoys mountain biking, hiking and swimming during the off-season.

Neuner had been involved in a nearly two-year relationship with Austrian ski technician and former biathlete Franz Perwein, whom she had met during the 2006 Junior/Youth World Championships. Until the autumn of 2009, she then lived in a relationship with DSV chief biathlon technician Björn Weisheit for 19 months.

In December 2009, Neuner confirmed a romantic relationship with Josef Holzer, a school day friend from Wallgau. The couple were civilly married in March 2014 and have a daughter, Verena Anna (born 30 May 2014 in Garmisch-Partenkirchen) and a son, Josef Valentin (born 8 November 2016 in Garmisch-Partenkirchen). Their church wedding took place on 17 October 2015.

== In the media ==
Biathlon is the most popular winter sport in Germany. Each World Cup event is shown live on German television and the January World Cup races in Oberhof, Ruhpolding and Antholz are regularly seen by over five million viewers. Following her three world championship titles in 2007, Neuner quickly became one of Germany's most popular female sport stars, often nicknamed "Gold Lena" in the media. During her first two years in the spotlight she signed several endorsement deals and claimed numerous awards. Neuner's popularity grew further with her success during the 2010 Winter Olympics. Her second gold medal win in the Olympic mass start was seen live by 9.75 million television viewers (a 31.5 per cent market share), the most watched programme of the Games in Germany. Her withdrawal from the Olympic relay was one of the dominating stories of the Winter Olympics in Germany, leading to much media speculation whether pulling out had been entirely her decision. She later received the Fair Play medal of Germany's Olympic Society for setting an example of "team spirit".

German Sportswoman of the Year award
Year	Results
2007	1st
2008	3rd
2010	2nd
2011	1st
2012	1st

Neuner won the Biathlon Award, chosen by the national coaches of the World Cup teams, for Female Athlete of the Year in both 2007 and 2008, and she was awarded the Goldener Ski (Golden Ski), the highest award of the German Ski Association in 2007, 2008 and 2010. The Forum Nordicum, a consortium of journalists form twelve countries, named her Biathlete of the Year in the 2007–08 and 2009–10 seasons, beating out her male counterparts Ole Einar Bjørndalen and Emil Hegle Svendsen respectively. Neuner was chosen as Germany's 2007 Sportswoman of the Year by the country's sports journalists. The following years, she came in third for the 2008 award and was voted in second place in 2010. Along with all Olympic medal winners, she received the Silberne Lorbeerblatt (Silver Laurel Leaf) in 2010, the highest state decoration for athletes in Germany. In 2011, readers of Germany's top selling newspaper Bild voted Neuner the seventh greatest German sportsperson of all time, and she was again named German Sportswoman of the Year. Nine months after her retirement, Neuner received Germany's Sportswoman of the Year award for a third time.

Neuner's interest in knitting has often been addressed by the German media and she maintains a knitting website, which includes detailed knitting instructions and a "knitting blog". She has stated that she usually takes knitting equipment on her travels during the season and that knitting is a way for her to relax. In 2007, Neuner declined an offer to appear nude in the German edition of Playboy. Outside of Germany, she is particularly popular in Russia, where she has a fan club and from where she has said to receive half of her fan mail. In 2010, Neuner appeared in an advertising campaign for a lingerie line. She explained she tried to use it in a deliberate attempt to correct her media image, after becoming irritated with her public persona of "little sweet Lena". She was an ambassador for the 2011 FIFA Women's World Cup in Germany. and a member of the board of trustees for Munich's bid to host the 2018 Winter Olympics.

== Record ==
=== Olympic Games ===
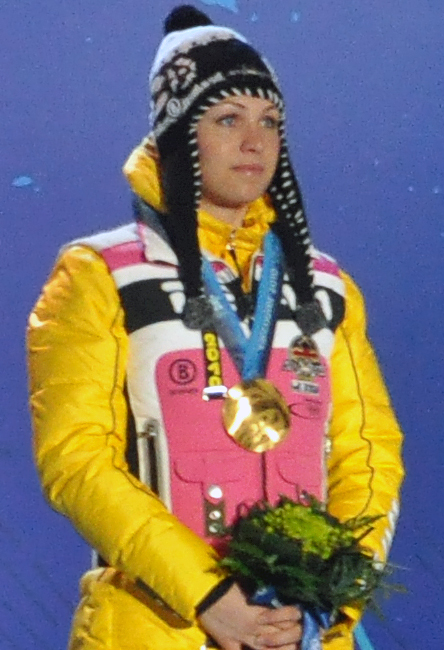
Neuner accepting her Olympic gold medal for the pursuit race

Neuner has won two gold medals and one silver medal at the Winter Olympic Games. At her only appearance at the 2010 Winter Olympics in Vancouver, Canada, she won gold in the pursuit and the mass start event. She also claimed silver in the opening sprint. After winning three medals, she decided not to participate in the concluding relay race.

Event	Age	Individual	Sprint	Pursuit	Mass start	Relay
2010 Winter Olympics, Vancouver	23	10th	Silver	Gold	Gold	—

=== World championships ===
Neuner is the most successful female biathlete in the history of Biathlon World Championships. She has won seventeen medals, twelve gold, four silver and one bronze. At her debut during the 2007 World Championships in Antholz, Italy, Neuner won three titles (sprint, pursuit and relay). One year later at the 2008 World Championships in Östersund, Sweden, she again claimed three gold medals, winning the mass start, relay and mixed relay events. Neuner did not win a title at the 2009 World Championships in Pyeongchang, South Korea; her best result was the silver medal in the relay event. She won her second mixed relay gold in Khanty-Mansiysk, Russia, in 2010. At the 2011 World Championships, she won three more titles (sprint, mass start, relay) and two silver medals (pursuit and mixed relay). At her final championships in 2012, Neuner won her world titles eleven (sprint) and twelve (relay), as well as her fourth silver (pursuit) and her first bronze medal (mixed relay).

Event	Age	Individual	Sprint	Pursuit	Mass start	Relay	Mixed relay
2007 Antholz, Italy	20	—	Gold	Gold	14th	Gold	—
2008 Östersund, Sweden	21	—	17th	6th	Gold	Gold	Gold
2009 Pyeongchang, South Korea	22	—	8th	11th	7th	Silver	—
2010 Khanty-Mansiysk, Russia	23	Not held in an Olympic season					Gold
2011 Khanty-Mansiysk, Russia	24	5th	Gold	Silver	Gold	Gold	Silver
2012 Ruhpolding, Germany	25	23rd	Gold	Silver	10th	Gold	Bronze

=== World Cup ===
During her first World Cup season, Neuner only appeared in ten races, finishing 34th in the overall standings. In the 2006–07 season, she became a regular in the German team and ended the season in fourth place. Neuner won the Biathlon World Cup for the first time in 2007–08; she also won the sprint and mass start disciplines. She finished the 2008–09 season fourth, winning the individual discipline that year. In the 2009–10 season, Neuner won the overall World Cup for a second time; by winning the pursuit and mass start scores as well, she has claimed each World Cup title at least once. In 2010–11, she won the sprint discipline for a second time and finished fifth in the season ranking. In her final World Cup season in 2011–12, Neuner won her third Overall World Cup title, as well as the sprint discipline.

Season	Age	Individual			Sprint			Pursuit			Mass start			Overall		
Season	Age	Races	Points	Position	Races	Points	Position	Races	Points	Position	Races	Points	Position	Races	Points	Position
2005–06	19	0/3	–	–	4/10	65	33rd	4/8	65	30th	2/5	34	30th	10/26	164	34th
2006–07	20	2/4	34	25th	10/10	285	4th	8/8	283	2nd	4/5	114	10th	24/27	720	4th
2007–08	21	2/3	33	20th	10/10	326	1st	8/8	232	5th	5/5	186	1st	25/26	818	1st
2008–09	22	3/4	129	1st	10/10	358	2nd	7/7	231	5th	5/5	146	8th	25/26	891	4th
2009–10	23	3/4	114	6th	8/10	334	2nd	6/6	256	1st	4/5	216	1st	21/25	933	1st
2010–11	24	3/4	99	14th	8/10	404	1st	5/7	221	6th	4/5	228	2nd	21/26	952	5th
2011–12	25	3/3	114	4th	10/10	571	1st	8/8	372	2nd	4/5	177	7th	25/26	1216	1st

*Key:Races—number of entered races/all races; Points—won World Cup points; Position—World Cup season ranking.
*Statistics as of 18 March 2012.''

==== World Cup wins ====
Over the course of seven seasons, Neuner has reached 34 personal World Cup wins. In the history of the International Biathlon Union she is ranked second behind Magdalena Forsberg (42), with Uschi Disl (30) third, for all-time career victories. In addition, she has won nine relay races and three mixed relay events as part of the German World Cup team. Neuner has often started slowly at the beginning of a winter season and has claimed only three of her individual victories before Christmas. Consequently, 18 of her 47 wins came in the month of March. Geographically most of her wins occurred in Khanty-Mansiysk, Russia (10), followed by Antholz, Italy (6) and Ruhpolding, Germany (6).

Individual wins (34)
No.	Date	Location	Discipline
1	5 January 2007	Oberhof, Germany	Sprint
2	3 March 2007	Antholz, Italy (WCH)	Sprint
3	4 March 2007	Antholz, Italy (WCH)	Pursuit
4	10 March 2007	Oslo, Norway	Pursuit
5	11 March 2007	Oslo, Norway	Mass start
6	15 March 2007	Khanty-Mansiysk, Russia	Sprint
7	17 March 2007	Khanty-Mansiysk, Russia	Pursuit
8	6 January 2008	Oberhof, Germany	Mass start
9	16 February 2008	Östersund, Sweden (WCH)	Mass start
10	28 February 2008	Pyeongchang, South Korea	Sprint
11	6 March 2008	Khanty-Mansiysk, Russia	Sprint
12	16 January 2009	Ruhpolding, Germany	Sprint
13	18 January 2009	Ruhpolding, Germany	Pursuit
14	28 March 2009	Khanty-Mansiysk, Russia	Pursuit
15	20 January 2010	Antholz, Italy	Individual
16	22 January 2010	Antholz, Italy	Sprint
17	17 February 2010	Vancouver, Canada (OG)	Pursuit
18	21 February 2010	Vancouver, Canada (OG)	Mass start
19	27 March 2010	Khanty-Mansiysk, Russia	Mass start
20	18 December 2010	Pokljuka, Slovenia	Sprint
21	13 February 2011	Fort Kent, United States	Mass start
22	5 March 2011	Khanty-Mansiysk, Russia (WCH)	Sprint
23	12 March 2011	Khanty-Mansiysk, Russia (WCH)	Mass start
24	17 March 2011	Oslo, Norway	Sprint
25	3 December 2011	Östersund, Sweden	Sprint
26	9 December 2011	Hochfilzen, Austria	Sprint
27	6 January 2012	Oberhof, Germany	Sprint
28	8 January 2012	Oberhof, Germany	Mass start
29	19 January 2012	Antholz, Italy	Sprint
30	2 February 2012	Oslo, Norway	Sprint
31	4 February 2012	Oslo, Norway	Pursuit
32	11 February 2012	Kontiolahti, Finland	Sprint
33	3 March 2012	Ruhpolding, Germany (WCH)	Sprint
34	16 March 2012	Khanty-Mansiysk, Russia	Sprint

Relay wins (13)
No.	Date	Location	Discipline
1	11 February 2007	Antholz, Italy (WCH)	Relay
2	16 December 2007	Pokljuka, Slovenia	Relay
3	9 January 2008	Ruhpolding, Germany	Relay
4	12 February 2008	Östersund, Sweden (WCH)	Mixed relay
5	17 February 2008	Östersund, Sweden (WCH)	Relay
6	21 December 2008	Hochfilzen, Austria	Relay
7	14 January 2009	Ruhpolding, Germany	Relay
8	14 March 2009	Vancouver, Canada	Relay
9	28 March 2010	Khanty-Mansiysk, Russia (WCH)	Mixed relay
10	11 December 2010	Hochfilzen, Austria	Relay
11	5 February 2011	Presque Isle, United States	Mixed relay
12	13 March 2011	Khanty-Mansiysk, Russia (WCH)	Relay
13	10 March 2012	Ruhpolding, Germany (WCH)	Relay

*Key:WCH—World Championships; OG—Olympic Games. Statistics as of 18 March 2012.

=== Overall record ===
During her seven season on the World Cup tour, Neuner had competed in a total of 175 races, winning 47 of them (a 26.86 win percentage). She has claimed at least one win in each discipline of biathlon and has scored World Cup points in all but three of her races.^{[note b]} Neuner has reached a total of 82 World Cup podiums (63 in individual races and 19 in team events). In addition, she has achieved 137 top ten finishes—78.29 per cent of all the races she has entered.

Result	Individual	Sprint	Pursuit	Mass start	Relay	Mixed relay	Total
1st Place	1	18	7	8	10	3	47
2nd Place	–	3	6	1	3	2	16
3rd Place	3	9	3	3	–	1	19
Top 10	11	45	33	24	18	6	137
Points	15	59	45	29	18	6	172
Other	1	1	1	–	–	–	3
Starts	16	60	46	29	18	6	175

*Results in all IBU World Cup races including relay events. Statistics as of 18 March 2012.

=== Junior/Youth World Championships ===
Neuner has won seven gold and four silver medals at the Biathlon Junior/Youth World Championships. With the exception of the individual discipline, she has won a medal in every race she entered. In 2004, at her first junior world championships in Haute Maurienne, France, Neuner won two titles (sprint and relay). One year later, she claimed gold in the sprint race in Kontiolahti, Finland, and in 2006, she again won two titles (pursuit and relay) in Presque Isle, Maine, United States. Neuner did not participate in the 2007 event. She returned to the junior world championships in 2008 when they were held in Ruhpolding, Germany, winning two more gold medals (sprint and pursuit).

Event	Individual	Sprint	Pursuit	Relay
2004 Haute Maurienne, France	—	Gold	Silver	Gold
2005 Kontiolahti, Finland	4th	Gold	Silver	Silver
2006 Presque Isle, United States	7th	Silver	Gold	Gold
2008 Ruhpolding, Germany	—	Gold	Gold	—

== Achievements and honours ==
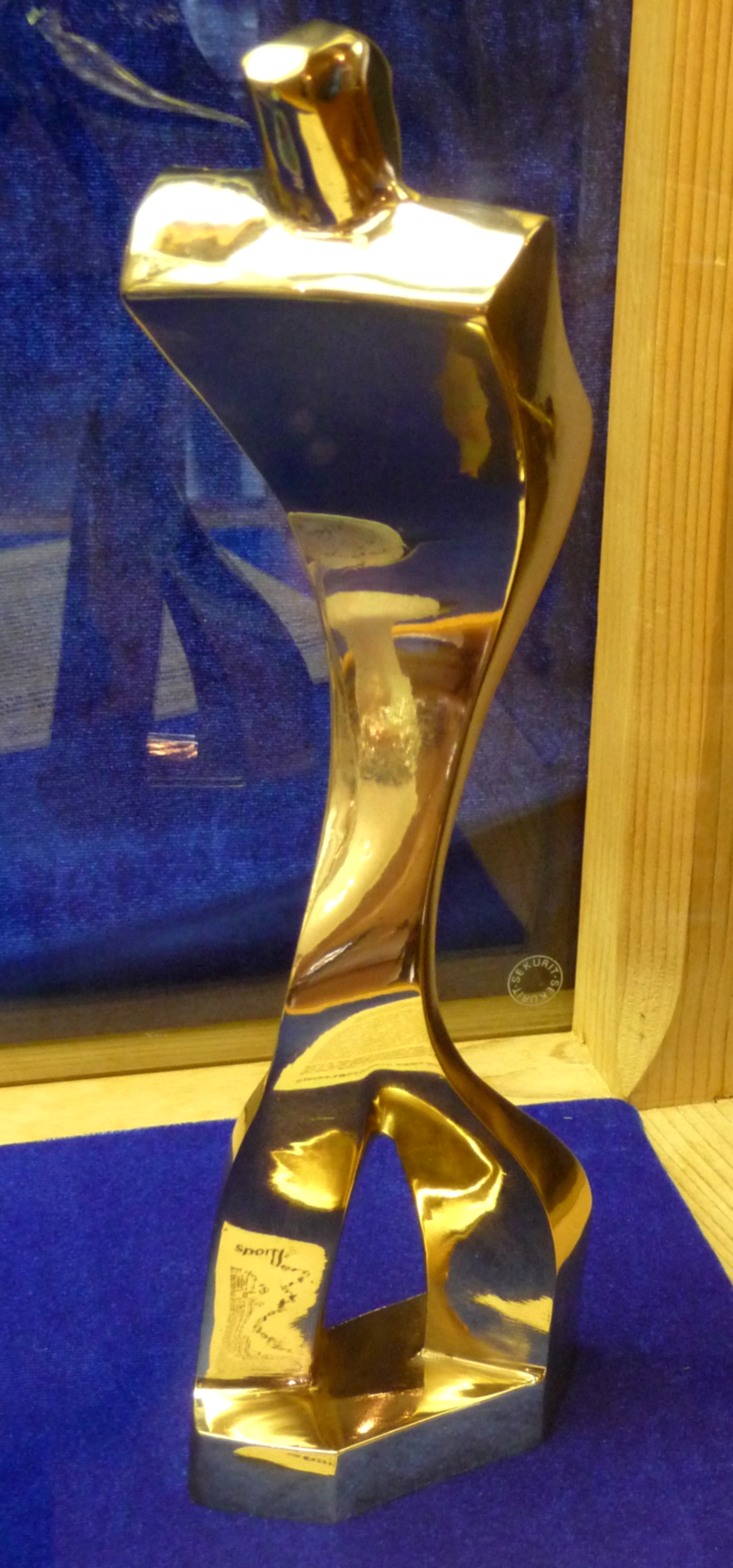
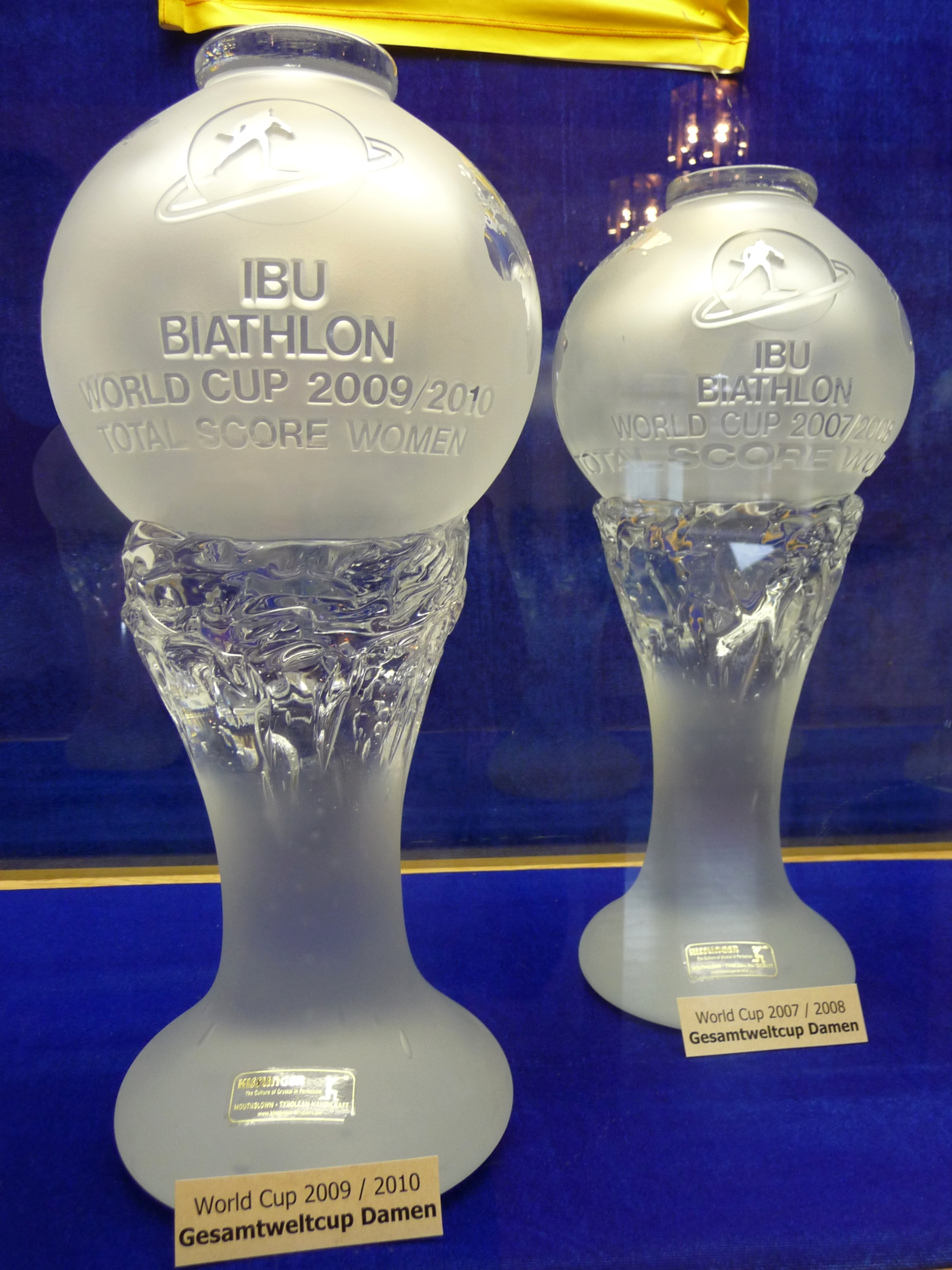
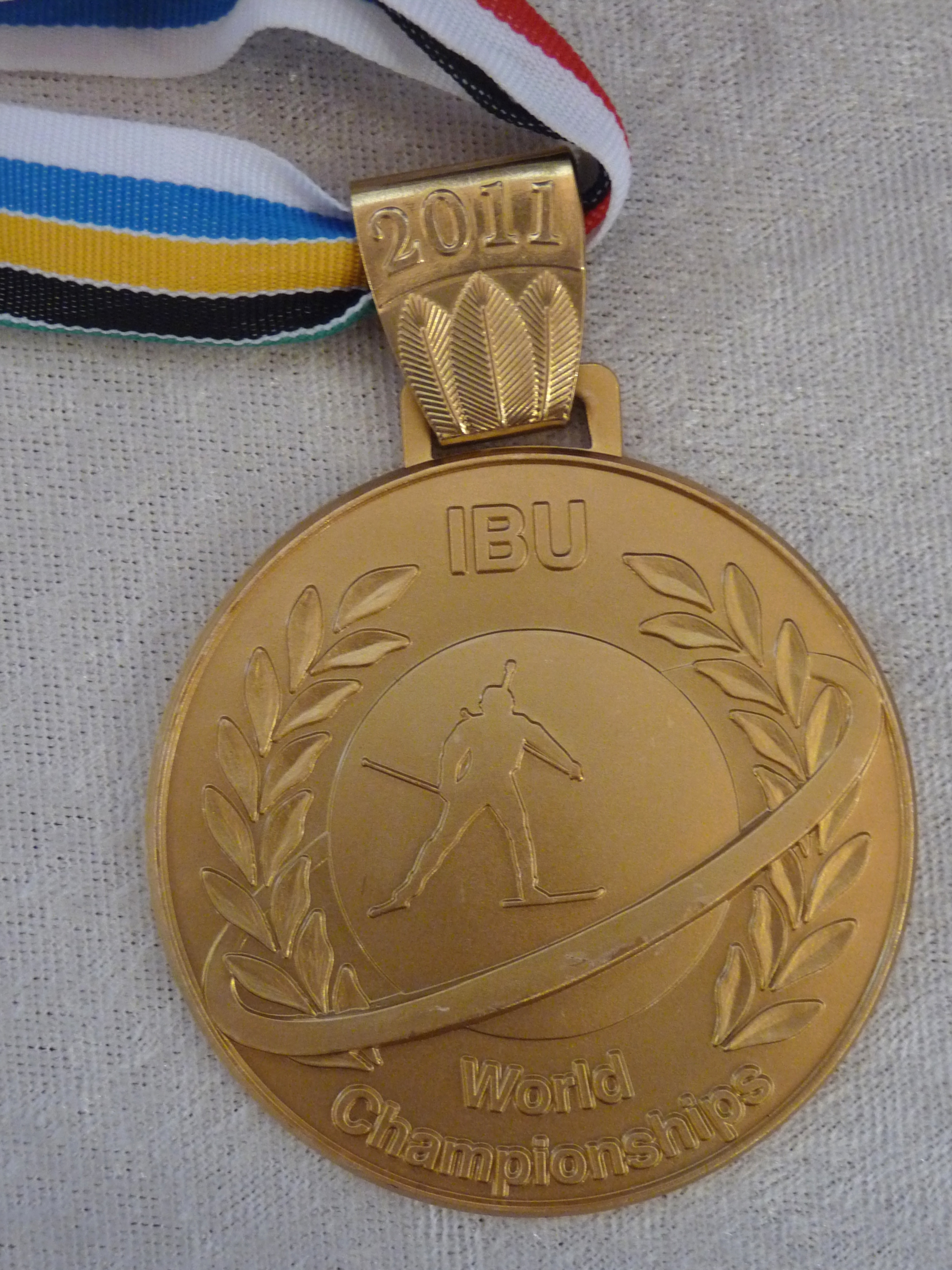
Several of Neuner's trophies on temporary display at Wallgau's town hall (from left to right): 2007 German Sportswoman of the Year award, 2007–08 and 2009–10 Overall World Cup crystal globes, 2011 World Championships sprint gold medal

International titles

- Winter Olympic Games – 2 gold medals
  - 2010: Pursuit, Mass start
- Overall Biathlon World Cup winner – 2007–08, 2009–10, 2011–2012
- Individual World Cup winner – 2008–09
- Sprint World Cup winner – 2007–08, 2010–11, 2011–2012
- Pursuit World Cup winner – 2009–10
- Mass start World Cup winner – 2007–08, 2009–10
- Biathlon World Championships – 12 gold medals
  - 2007: Sprint, Pursuit, Relay
  - 2008: Mass start, Relay, Mixed relay
  - 2010: Mixed Relay
  - 2011: Sprint, Mass start, Relay
  - 2012: Sprint, Relay
- Biathlon Junior/Youth World Championships – 7 gold medals

Awards

- German Sportswoman of the Year – 2007, 2011
- Biathlon Award for Female Newcomer of the Year – 2007
- Biathlon Award for Female Athlete of the Year – 2007, 2008
- Goldener Ski of the DSV – 2007, 2008, 2010
- Biathlete of the Year of the Forum Nordicum – 2008, 2010
- Silbernes Lorbeerblatt – 2010

== Notes ==
a. ^{a} ^{f} Course times are a measure for a biathlete's skiing performance. They indicate the net skiing time (sum of all lap times), excluding time spent at the shooting range, in the penalty loop or time penalties (individual discipline only).
b. ^{b} ^{g} World Championship and Olympic results are included in Biathlon World Cup scores; gold medals are recognised as World Cup wins.
c. ^{c} Jirina Pelcová was six months younger when she won the Overall World Cup in 1990 still under the UIPMB, not recognised by the IBU.

Awards and achievements
Preceded by Kati Wilhelm; Maria Höfl-Riesch	German Sportswoman of the Year; 2007; 2011, 2012	Succeeded by Britta Steffen; Christina Obergföll
