= Wallgau =

- Municipality
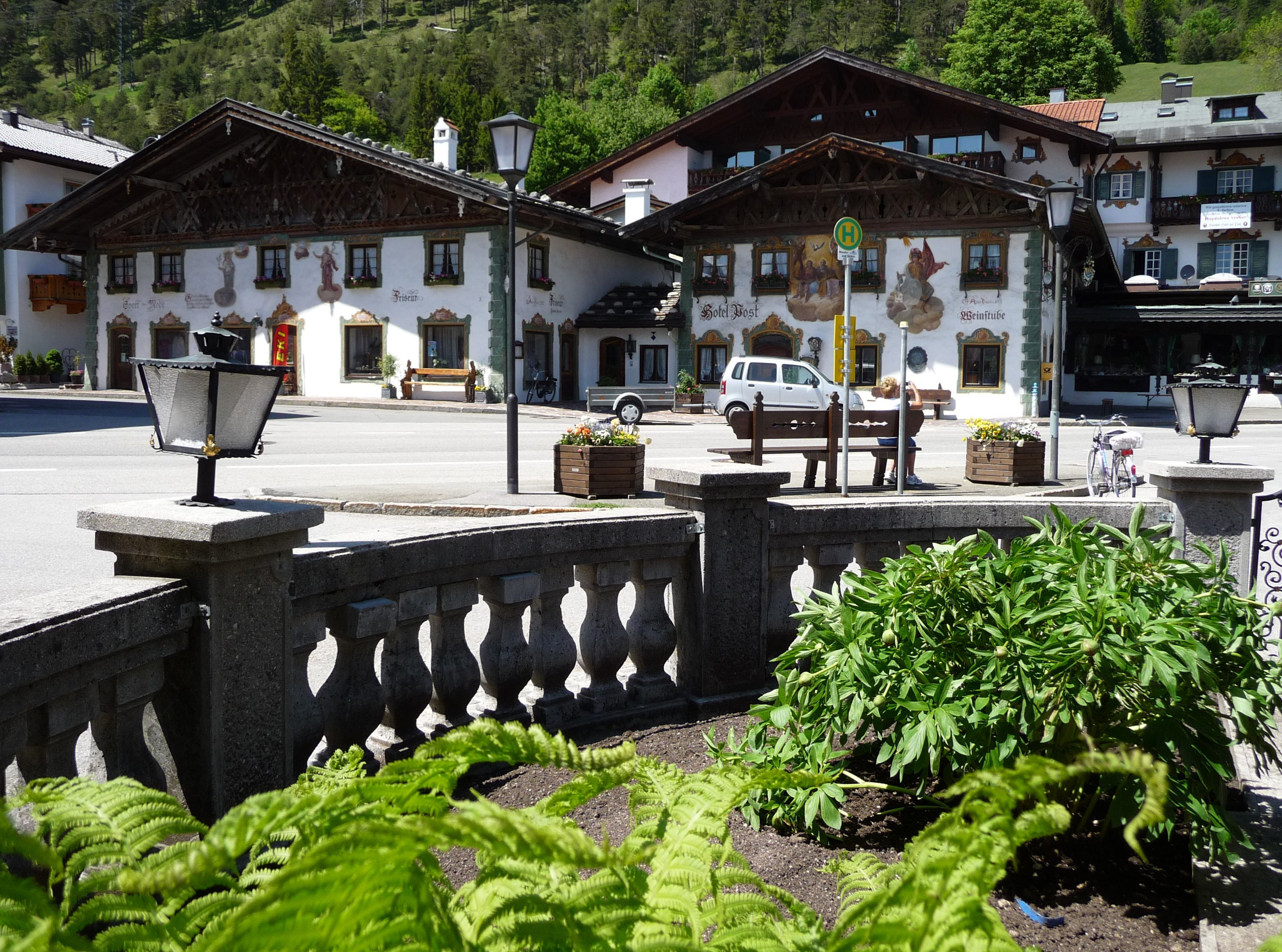
- Center of the village

- Coat of arms

- Location of Wallgau within Garmisch-Partenkirchen district
- Interactive map of Wallgau
- Location within Germany Location within Bavaria
- Coordinates: 47°31′N 11°17′E
- Country: Germany
- State: Bavaria
- Admin. region: Oberbayern
- District: Garmisch-Partenkirchen

Government
  - Mayor (2020–26): Bastian Eiter

Area
  - Total: 33.96 km^{2} (13.11 sq mi)
- Elevation: 866 m (2,841 ft)

Population (2025-12-31)
  - Total: 1,548
  - Density: 45.58/km^{2} (118.1/sq mi)
- Time zone: UTC+01:00 (CET)
  - Summer (DST): UTC+02:00 (CEST)
- Postal codes: 82499
- Dialling codes: 08825
- Vehicle registration: GAP
- Website: www.wallgau.de

Wallgau is a municipality in the district of Garmisch-Partenkirchen, in Bavaria, Germany.

== Population ==
=== Growth ===
Year	Population	Year	Population
1840	274	1987	1,170
1871	265	1990	1,304
1900	367	2000	1,376
1925	599	2003	1,428
1939	625	2004	1,415
1950	913	2005	1,428
1961	942	2006	1,426
1970	1,071	2007	1,414

*Statistics according to the Bavarian government, as of 2007.

=== Demographics ===
Age group	Total (%)	Male (%)	Female (%)
under 6	5.4	5.8	5.1
6–15	10.4	11.7	9.0
15–18	3.5	3.5	3.6
18–25	7.2	8.3	6.1
25–30	6.4	6.1	6.8
30–40	13.2	13.2	13.1
40–50	15.3	15.4	15.1
50–65	17.9	16.4	19.4
over 65	20.7	19.6	21.8
Total	100	51.3	48.7

*Statistics according to the Bavarian government, as of 2007.

== Notable people ==
- Magdalena Neuner, (born 1987), twelve-time biathlon world champion, Olympic champion, Biathlon World Cup winner. Neuner has lived in the Bavarian village of Wallgau since birth.

== Gallery ==
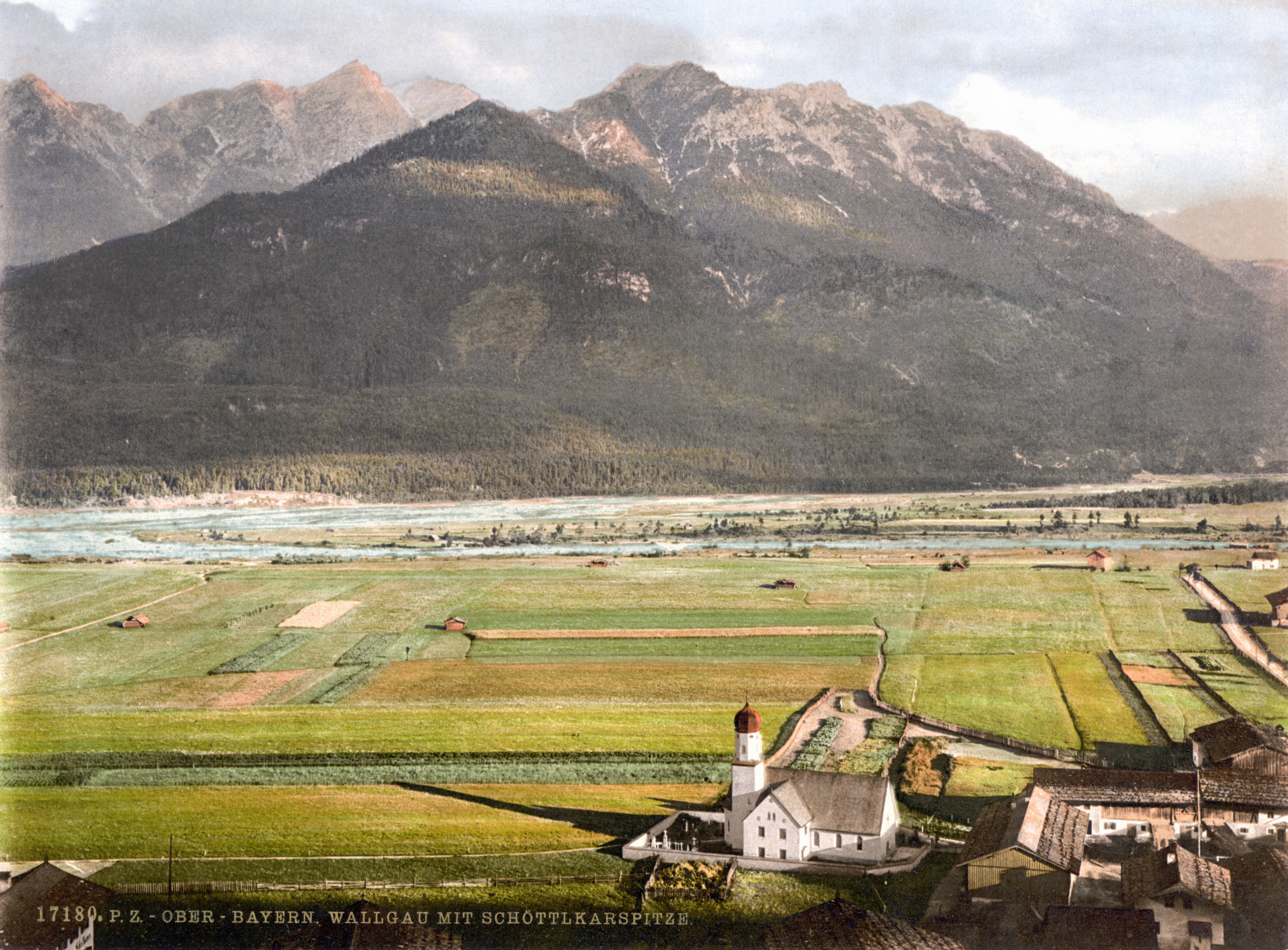
Wallgau between 1890 and 1905

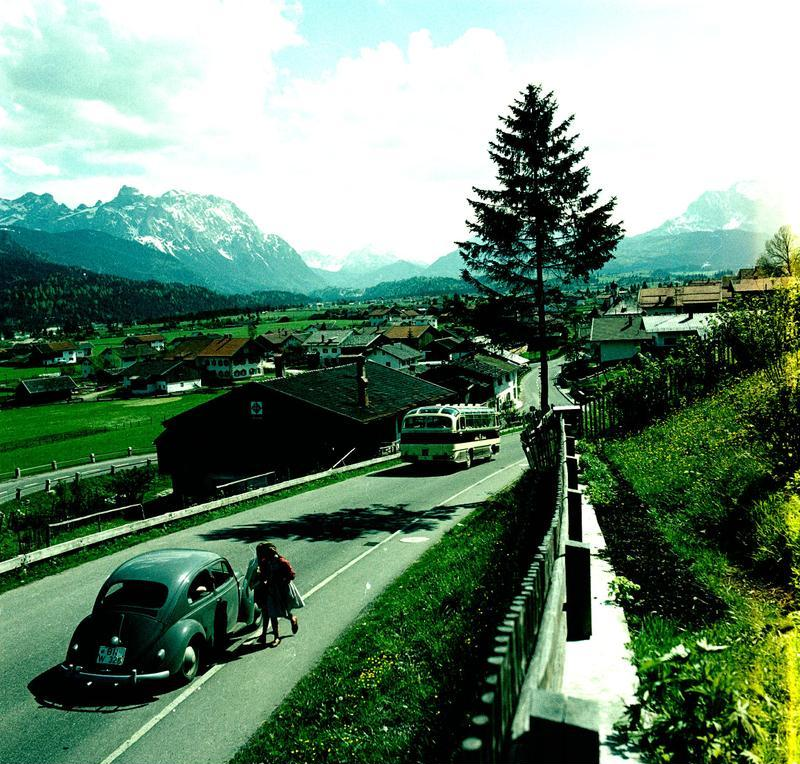
Wallgau in May 1960

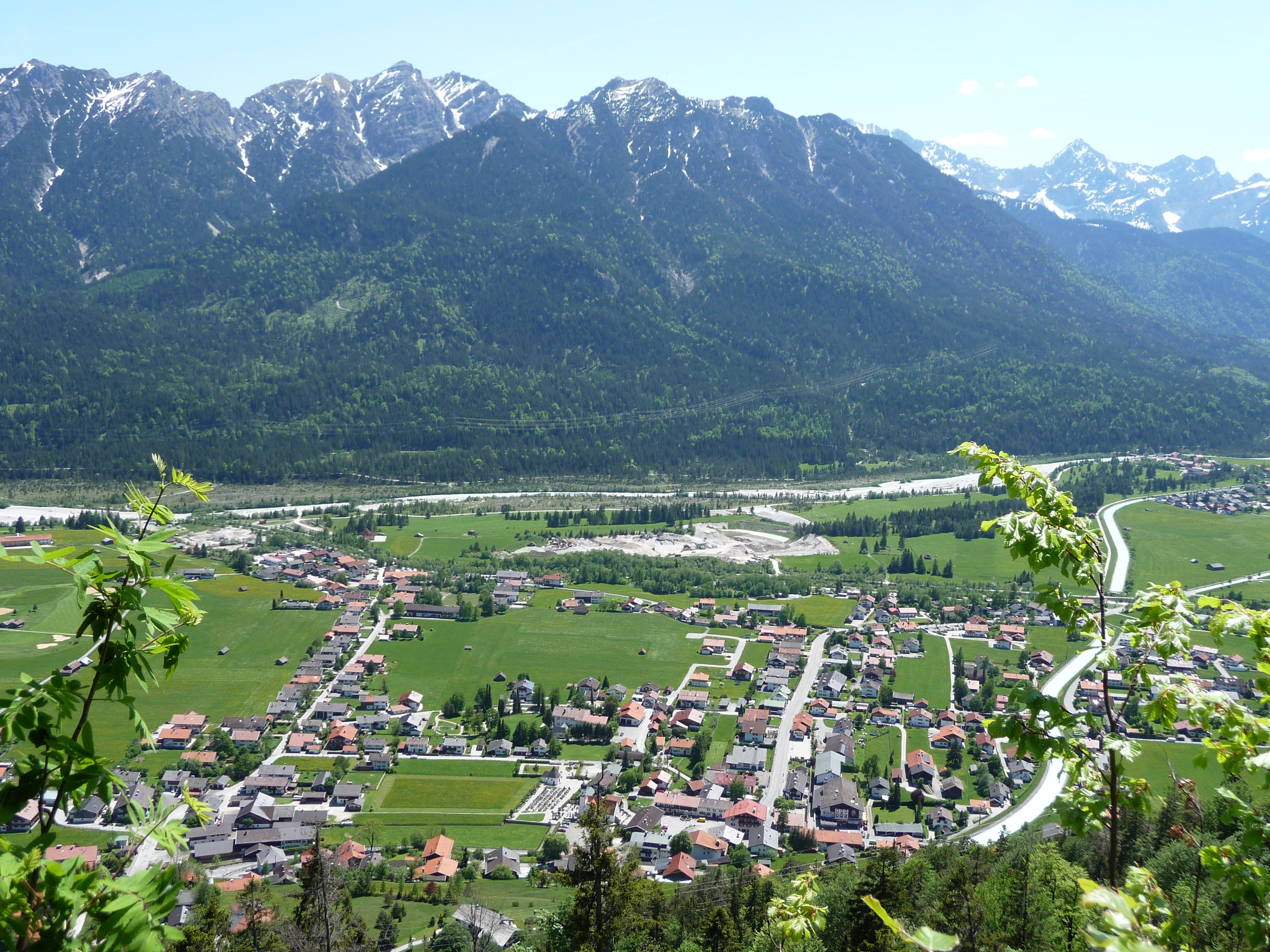
Wallgau from the mountain Krepelschrofen

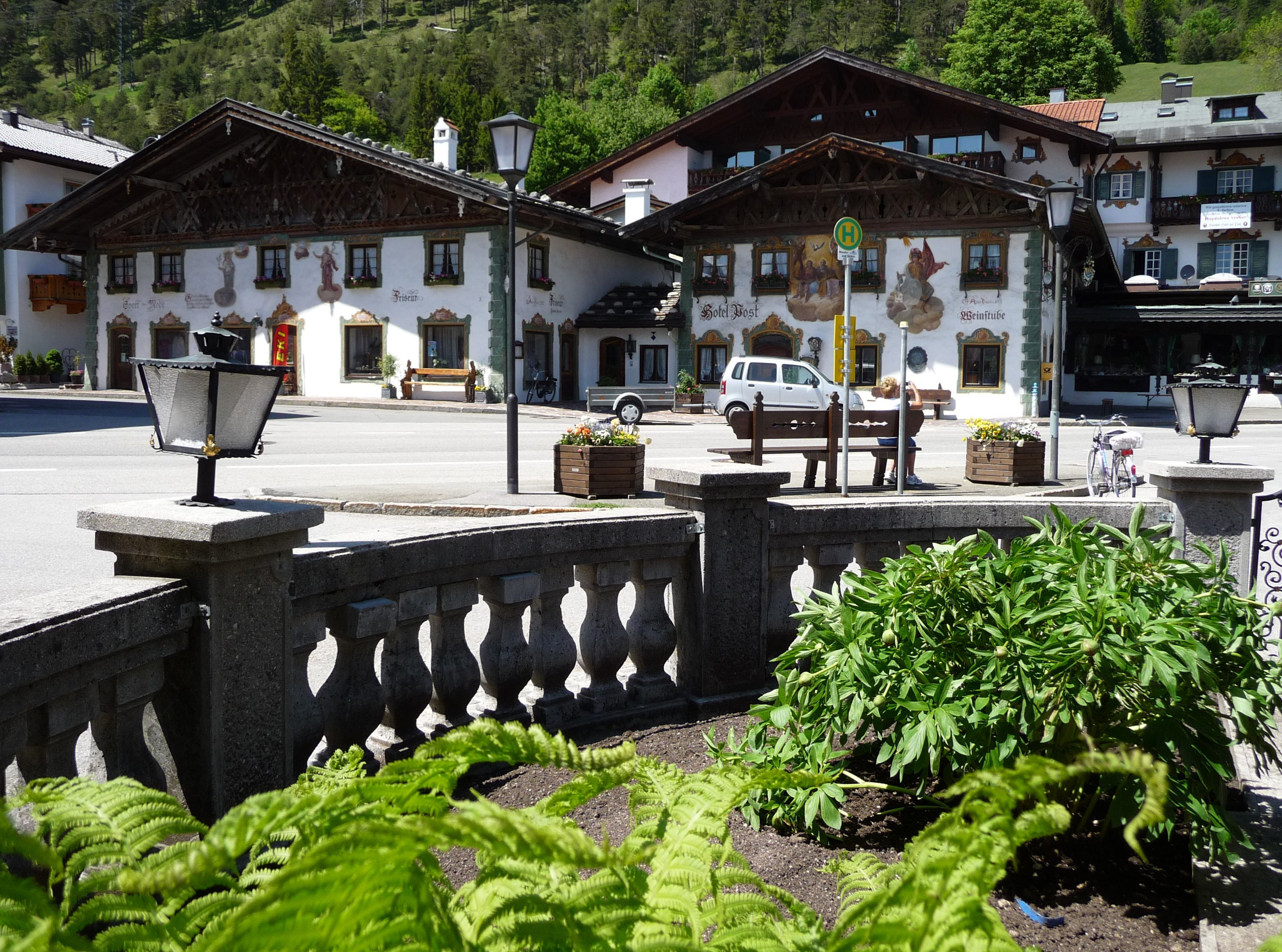
Village green

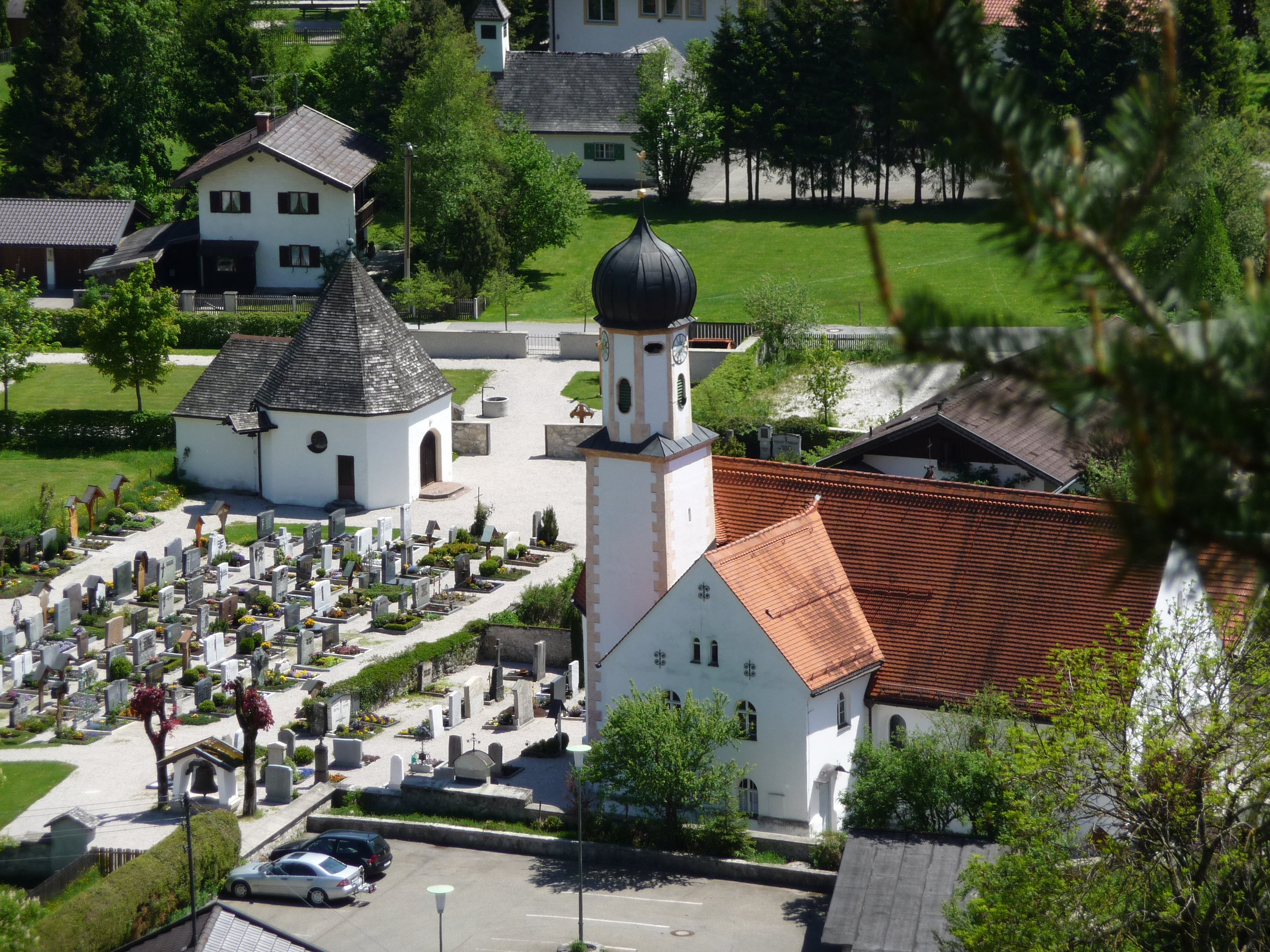
Town church

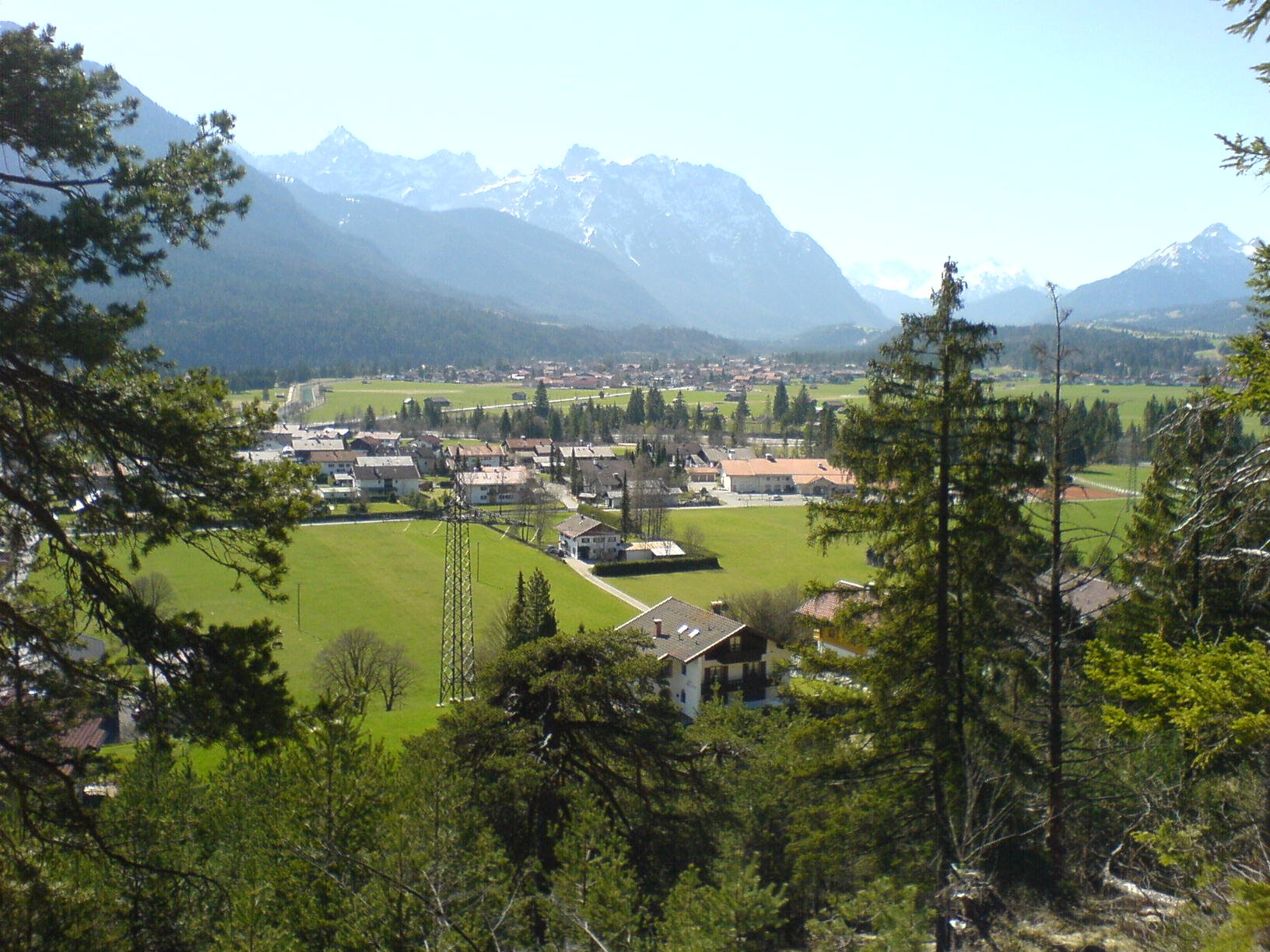
Wallgau in 2007

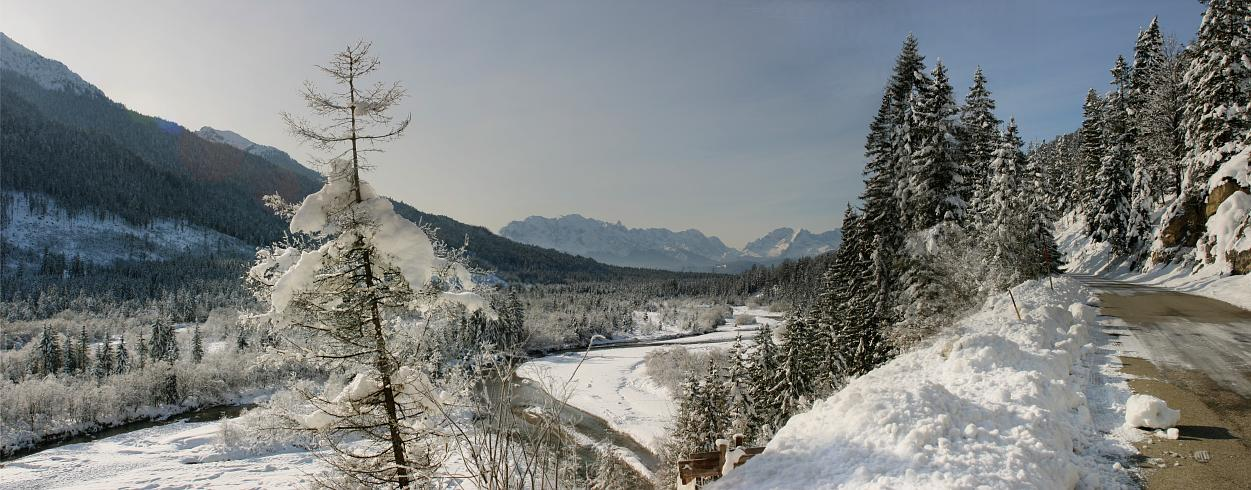
Wallgau region in winter

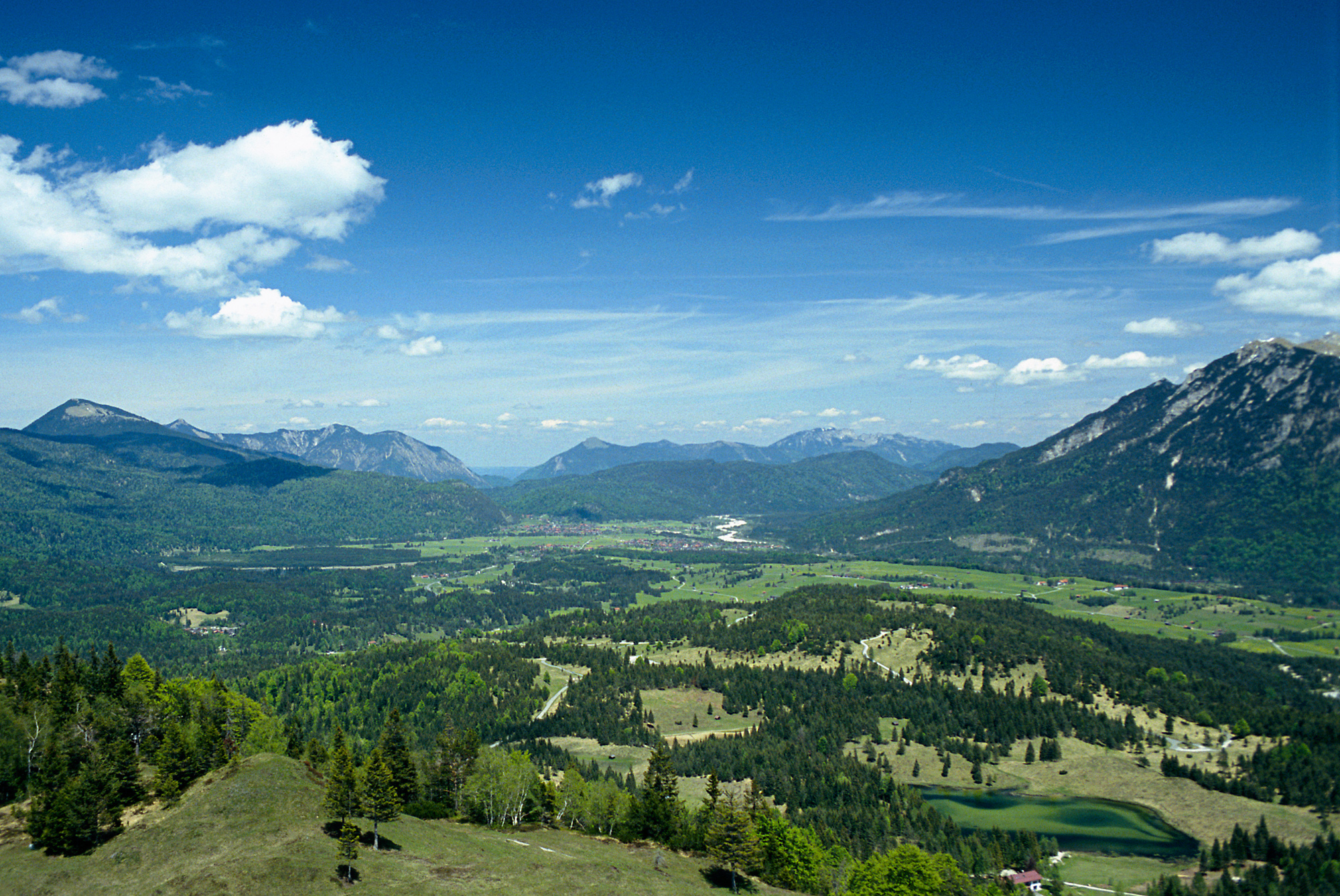
View of the wider region
