= Shooting errors =

Errors in firearm or airsoft shooting

In firearm or airsoft shooting, shooting errors or shooting mistakes are shooter's actions or external influences, leading to the consequence that a bullet or pellet misses the spot the shooter intended to hit. Shooting errors can be classified as shooter faults such as aiming errors and triggering errors, and errors caused by external influences.
